= 2012 Molde FK season =

Molde
2012 season
- Chairman: Øystein Neerland
- Manager: Ole Gunnar Solskjær
- Stadium: Aker Stadion
- Tippeligaen: 1st (champions)
- Norwegian Cup: Semi-final vs. Tromsø
- Champions League: Third qualifying round vs. Basel
- Europa League: Group stage (4th)
- Top goalscorer: League: Davy Claude Angan (13); All: Davy Claude Angan (22)
- Highest home attendance: 11,112 vs. Rosenborg (28 October 2012)
- Lowest home attendance: 2,321 vs. HamKam (20 June 2012)
- Average home league attendance: 7,687
Home colours	Away colours	Third colours

The 2012 season was Molde's 5th consecutive year in Tippeligaen, and their 36th season in the top flight of Norwegian football. It was Ole Gunnar Solskjær's second season as the club's manager. Molde were defending champions in Tippeligaen and played through qualification for UEFA Champions League. Molde entered the Champions League in the second qualifying round, where they eliminated Ventspils before and facing Basel of Switzerland in the third qualifying round. They lost 1–2 on aggregate and were knocked out, dropping down into the Play off round of the UEFA Europa League. Molde successfully defended their title on 11 November 2012, when they beat Hønefoss 1–0, whilst their closest title challengers, Strømsgodset lost 2–1 away to Sandnes Ulf.

== Transfers ==
=== In ===
Date	Position	Number	Nationality	Name	From	Fee
1 January 2012†	DF	14	(Norway)	Martin Linnes	(Norway) Kongsvinger	Free
1 January 2012	GK	40	(Norway)	Ola Hermann Opheim	(Norway) Steinkjer	Unknown
1 January 2012	DF	35	(Norway)	Victor Johansen	(Norway) Vålerenga	Unknown
6 January 2012	DF	6	(Norway)	Even Hovland	(Norway) Sogndal	8 million NOK
16 February 2012	MF	17	(Nigeria)	Emmanuel Ekpo	(United States) Columbus Crew	Free
30 July 2012	MF	16	(Norway)	Etzaz Hussain	(Norway) Fredrikstad	3 Million NOK
12 August 2012	DF	24	(Norway)	Magnar Ødegaard	(Norway) Sarpsborg 08	Undisclosed

† Linnes' move was announced on 31 August 2011 and finalised on 1 January 2012.

=== Out ===
Date	Position	Number	Nationality	Name	To	Fee
1 January 2012	GK	12	(Norway)	Knut Dørum Lillebakk	Retired	
1 January 2012	DF	14	(Norway)	Christian Steen	Retired	
1 January 2012	FW	19	(Brazil)	José Mota	(South Korea) Busan I'Park	Free
1 January 2012	DF	24	(Norway)	Torjus Aaland	Released	
14 January 2012	MF	4	(Norway)	Thomas Holm	(Norway) Fredrikstad	Free
1 August 2012	GK	26	(Norway)	Elias Valderhaug	(Norway) Kongsvinger	Unknown
1 August 2012	MF	8	(Senegal)	Makhtar Thioune	(Norway) Viking	2 million NOK
31 August 2012	FW	19	(Brazil)	Vini Dantas	(Norway) Bodø/Glimt	

=== Loan in ===
Date from	Date to	Position	Nationality	Name	From
23 August 2012	End of season	FW	(Senegal)	Pape Paté Diouf	(Denmark) Copenhagen

=== Loan out ===
Date from	Date to	Position	Nationality	Name	To
9 January 2012	31 July 2012	MF	(Senegal)	Makhtar Thioune	(Germany) Karlsruher SC
13 January 2012	31 December 2012	DF	(Norway)	Krister Wemberg	(Norway) Bodø/Glimt
7 March 2012	31 December 2012	DF	(United States)	Sean Cunningham	(Norway) Stabæk
28 March 2012	31 December 2012	MF	(Norway)	Pål Erik Ulvestad	(Norway) Kristiansund
12 April 2012	31 July 2012	GK	(Norway)	Elias Valderhaug	(Norway) Start
1 August 2012	31 December 2012	MF	(Norway)	Zlatko Tripić	(Norway) Fredrikstad
1 August 2012	31 December 2012	MF	(Norway)	Simon Markeng	(Norway) Kristiansund

== Coaching staff ==
Manager	Ole Gunnar Solskjær
Coach	Mark Dempsey
Goalkeeper coach	Richard Hartis

== Pre-season and friendlies ==
=== Friendlies ===
23 January 2012	Kristiansund	2–1	Molde	Kristiansund
17:30 CET	Neergård 30'; Hopmark 69'	Report	Markeng 75'

10 February 2012	Molde	3–2	Ranheim	Molde
17:00 CET	Hoseth 48'; Chima 70'; Hovland 76'	Report	Løkberg 5'; Bye 11'	Stadium: Årølia kunstgress

17 February 2012	Molde	0–0	Sogndal	Molde
18:00 CET		Report		Stadium: Årølia kunstgress

21 February 2012	Molde (Norway)	3–0	(Russia) Spartak Moscow	Marbella, Spain
18:00 CET	Hestad 23'; Forren 42'; Angan 53'	Report

23 February 2012	Unión Estepona (Spain)	1–3	(Norway) Molde	Marbella, Spain
17:00 CET	Unknown 84'	Report	Dantas 31'; Hollingen 39'; Ekpo 68'

25 February 2012	Alania Vladikavkaz (Russia)	0–1	(Norway) Molde	Marbella, Spain
15:00 CET		Report	Berget 87'

28 February 2012	Xerez (Spain)	1–0	(Norway) Molde	Jerez, Spain
12:00 CET	Unknown 83'	Report		Stadium: Estadio Municipal de Chapín

9 March 2012	Raufoss	2–1	Molde	Raufoss
18:00 CET	Johansen 16'; Hjelmtvedt 80'	Report	Markeng 22'	Stadium: Raufoss Storhall

10 March 2012	Lillestrøm	4–5	Molde	Lillestrøm
14:00 CET	Vaagan Moen 19', 36' (pen.), 52'; Ringstad 74'	Report	Moström 9'; Chima 19', 87'; Gatt 59'; Westerberg 77' (o.g.)	Stadium: LSK-Hallen

16 March 2012	Molde	3–2	Aalesund	Molde
19:00 CET	Hovland 52'; Forren 82'; Angan 89'	Report	Phillips 50'; Hovland 84' (o.g.)	Stadium: Aker Stadion; Attendance: 1,714

=== Copa del Sol ===
28 January 2012	Molde (Norway)	2–1	(Slovenia) Olimpija	Estadio Municipal Guillermo Amor, Benidorm
13:00 CET	Berget 25'; Tripić 81'	Report	Nikezić 78'	Attendance: 200

1 February 2012	Dalian Aerbin (China)	1–2	(Norway) Molde	Estadio Municipal Guillermo Amor, Benidorm
16:00 CET	Wang Jun 48'	Report	Tripić 72'; Chima 81'

4 February 2012	Spartak Moscow (Russia)	3–0	(Norway) Molde	Estadio Municipal Guillermo Amor, Benidorm
16:00 CET	Dzyuba 18'; Welliton 41', 46'

== Competitions ==
=== Tippeligaen ===
==== Results summary ====
Overall								Home						Away					
Pld	W	D	L	GF	GA	GD	Pts	W	D	L	GF	GA	GD	W	D	L	GF	GA	GD
30	19	5	6	51	31	+20	62	14	0	1	33	16	+17	5	5	5	18	15	+3

==== Results by round ====
Round	1	2	3	4	5	6	7	8	9	10	11	12	13	14	15	16	17	18	19	20	21	22	23	24	25	26	27	28	29	30
Ground	H	A	H	A	H	A	H	A	H	A	H	A	H	A	A	H	A	H	A	H	A	H	A	H	H	A	H	A	H	A
Result	W	L	W	L	W	L	W	W	W	W	W	D	W	L	W	L	D	W	W	W	L	W	D	W	W	D	W	D	W	W
Position	1	10	2	9	6	8	7	3	2	2	2	2	2	2	2	2	2	2	2	1	2	2	1	1	1	2	1	1	1	1

Updated to match(es) played on 18 November 2012. Source: see below
A = Away; H = Home; W = Win; D = Draw; L = Loss

==== Results ====
23 March 2012 1	Molde	2–1	Strømsgodset	Molde
19:00 CET (UTC+1)	Angan 67'; Gatt 70'	Summary	Wikheim 86'	Stadium: Aker Stadion; Attendance: 9,052; Referee: Tommy Skjerven

1 April 2012 2	Haugesund	2–0	Molde	Haugesund
18:00 CEST (UTC+2)	Søderlund 15', 54'	Summary		Stadium: Haugesund Stadion; Attendance: 4,880; Referee: Tore Hansen

9 April 2012 3	Molde	2–1	Brann	Molde
20:00 CEST (UTC+2)	Berget 9'; Angan 52'	Summary	Askar 90+5'	Stadium: Aker Stadion; Attendance: 8,771; Referee: Svein-Erik Edvartsen

16 April 2012 4	Viking	1–0	Molde	Stavanger
19:00 CEST (UTC+2)	Ørnskov 51'	Summary		Stadium: Viking Stadion; Attendance: 9,206; Referee: Anders Johansen

23 April 2012 5	Molde	3–2	Lillestrøm	Molde
18:00 CEST (UTC+2)	Angan 28'; Moström 85'; Chima 88'	Summary	Pálmason 42'; Kippe 66'	Stadium: Aker Stadion; Attendance: 8,614; Referee: Svein Oddvar Moen

28 April 2012 6	Sogndal	2–1	Molde	Sogndalsfjøra
20:00 CEST (UTC+2)	Linnes 73' (o.g.); Ulrik Flo 77'	Summary	Moström 20'; Chima (yellow card) 49'	Stadium: Fosshaugane Campus; Attendance: 4,743; Referee: Trond Ivar Døvle

6 May 2012 7	Molde	2–1	Aalesund	Molde
20:00 CEST (UTC+2)	Moström 24'; Hoseth 59' (pen.)	Summary	Arnefjord 38'	Stadium: Aker Stadion; Attendance: 10,352; Referee: Svein Erik Edvartsen

12 May 2012 8	Stabæk	0–5	Molde	Bærum
16:00 CEST (UTC+2)		Summary	Hestad 3'; Angan 6', 66'; Gatt 9'; Berget 83'	Stadium: Nadderud Stadion; Attendance: 4,207; Referee: Kristoffer Helgerud

16 May 2012 9	Molde	2–0	Fredrikstad	Molde
18:00 CEST (UTC+2)	Angan 30', 52'	Summary		Stadium: Aker Stadion; Attendance: 9,232; Referee: Dag Vidar Hafsås

20 May 2012 10	Sandnes Ulf	0–2	Molde	Sandnes
18:00 CEST (UTC+2)		Summary	Gatt 26'; Berget 52'	Stadium: Sandnes Idrettspark; Attendance: 4,770; Referee: Kjetil Saelen

23 May 2012 11	Molde	3–2	Tromsø	Molde
19:00 CEST (UTC+2)	Berget 51'; Angan 57'; Hovland 69'	Summary	Ondrášek 35'; Mbodj (yellow card) 58' (yellow-red card) 65'; Johansen 90+3'	Stadium: Aker Stadion; Attendance: 9,239; Referee: Tom Harald Hagen

28 May 2012 12	Hønefoss	1–1	Molde	Hønefoss
18:00 CEST (UTC+2)	Bolseth 44'	Summary	Angan 26'	Stadium: Aka Arena; Attendance: 3,568; Referee: Tore Hansen

30 June 2012 13	Molde	3–1	Odd Grenland	Molde
18:00 CEST (UTC+2)	Berget 22'; Hoseth 38', 64' (pen.)	Summary	Hansen (red card) 61'; Børven 90+5'	Stadium: Aker Stadion; Attendance: 9,378; Referee: Kjetil Saelen

8 July 2012 14	Rosenborg	1–0	Molde	Trondheim
18:00 CEST (UTC+2)	Svensson 49'	Summary		Stadium: Lerkendal Stadion; Attendance: 15,979; Referee: Tommy Skjerven

14 July 2012 15	Vålerenga	1–2	Molde	Oslo
18:00 CEST (UTC+2)	Pedersen 69'	Summary	Gatt 26'; Angan 87'	Stadium: Ullevaal Stadion; Attendance: 10,175; Referee: Dag Vidar Hafsås

21 July 2012 16	Molde	1–2	Viking	Molde
18:00 CEST (UTC+2)	Gatt 46'	Summary	Berisha 28'; Forren 41' (o.g.)	Stadium: Aker Stadion; Attendance: 10,539; Referee: Svein Erik Edvartsen

28 July 2012 17	Lillestrøm	1–1	Molde	Lillestrøm
18:00 CEST (UTC+2)	Nystuen 89'	Summary	Simonsen 34'	Stadium: Åråsen Stadion; Attendance: 5,188; Referee: Kristoffer Helgerud

4 August 2012 18	Molde	2–1	Sogndal	Molde
20:00 CEST (UTC+2)	Linnes 27'; Chima 62'	Summary	Brochmann 48'; Bakke (yellow card) 22' (yellow-red card) 83'	Stadium: Aker Stadion; Attendance: 8,503; Referee: Trond Ivar Døvle

12 August 2012 19	Aalesund	0–1	Molde	Ålesund
20:00 CEST (UTC+2)		Summary	Hussain 33'	Stadium: Color Line Stadion; Attendance: 10,247; Referee: Tommy Skjerven

26 August 2012 20	Molde	2–0	Vålerenga	Molde
18:00 CEST (UTC+2)	Gatt 3'; Angan 12'	Summary		Stadium: Aker Stadion; Attendance: 9,342; Referee: Svein Moen

2 September 2012 21	Brann	4–1	Molde	Bergen
18:00 CEST (UTC+2)	Askar 47'; Wangberg 67'; Ojo 89', 90+1'	Summary	Angan 27'	Stadium: Brann Stadion; Attendance: 12,176; Referee: Dag Vidar Hafsas

15 September 2012 22	Molde	1–0	Haugesund	Molde
18:00 CEST (UTC+2)	Berget 13'	Report		Stadium: Aker Stadion; Attendance: 8,614; Referee: Brage Sandmoen

23 September 2012 23	Odd Grenland	0–0	Molde	Skien
18:00 CEST (UTC+2)		Report		Stadium: Skagerak Arena; Attendance: 4,930; Referee: Ola Hobber Nilsen

30 September 2012 24	Molde	4–3	Stabæk	Molde
18:00 CEST (UTC+2)	Chima 25', 29', 51'; Stamnestrø 49'	Report	Boli 1'; Gunnarsson 32'; Haugsdal 56'	Stadium: Aker Stadion; Attendance: 8,827; Referee: Kjetil Sælen

7 October 2012 25	Molde	3–2	Sandnes Ulf	Molde
18:00 CEST (UTC+2)	Moström 3'; Berget 23' (pen.); Forren 86'	Report	Høiland 83'; Raskaj 85'	Stadium: Aker Stadion; Attendance: 8,506; Referee: Trond Ivar Døvle

21 October 2012 26	Strømsgodset	1–1	Molde	Drammen
18:00 CEST (UTC+2)	Konradsen (yellow card) 34'; Storbæk 90'	Summary	Berget 15'; Gatt (yellow card) 38'; Hestad (yellow card) 50'; Diouf (yellow card) 72'; Vatshaug (yellow card) 90+2'	Stadium: Marienlyst Stadion; Attendance: 7,451; Referee: Svein Edvartsen

28 October 2012 27	Molde	2–0	Rosenborg	Molde
18:00 CET (UTC+1)	Diouf 60'; Hussain 90+4'	Summary		Stadium: Aker Stadion; Attendance: 11,112; Referee: Svein Oddvar Moen

4 November 2012 28	Tromsø	1–1	Molde	Tromsø
18:00 CET (UTC+1)	Prijović 77'	Report	Chima 4'	Stadium: Alfheim Stadion; Attendance: 4,546; Referee: Tom Harald Hagen

11 November 2012 29	Molde	1–0	Hønefoss	Molde
18:00 CET (UTC+1)	Chima 59'	Summary		Stadium: Aker Stadion; Attendance: 9,986; Referee: Ken Henry Johnsen

18 November 2012 30	Fredrikstad	0–2	Molde	Fredrikstad
18:00 CET (UTC+1)	Ramberg (red card) 90'	Summary	Angan 90' (pen.); Hestad 90+3'	Stadium: Fredrikstad Stadion; Attendance: 9,125; Referee: Svein Oddvar Moen

==== Table ====
Pos	Team	Pld	W	D	L	GF	GA	GD	Pts	Qualification or relegation
1	Molde (C)	30	19	5	6	51	31	+20	62	Qualification for the Champions League second qualifying round
2	Strømsgodset	30	17	7	6	62	40	+22	58	Qualification for the Europa League second qualifying round (Note: Hødd, which played in the 2012 First Division, also qualified for the 2013–14 UEFA Europa League second qualifying round as winners of the 2012 Norwegian Cup.)
3	Rosenborg	30	15	10	5	53	26	+27	55	Qualification for the Europa League first qualifying round (Note: Tromsø qualified for the first qualifying round of the UEFA Europa League via the UEFA Fair Play ranking.)
4	Tromsø	30	14	7	9	45	32	+13	49	Qualification for the Europa League first qualifying round
5	Viking	30	14	7	9	41	36	+5	49	

Source: fotball.no
Rules for classification: 1) points; 2) goal difference; 3) number of goals scored.
(C) Champions

=== Norwegian Cup ===
1 May 2012 First Round	Sunndal	0–4	Molde	Sunndalsøra
18:00 CEST (UTC+2)		Summary	Stamnestrø 28', 59'; Angan 78', 88'	Stadium: Sande Stadion; Attendance: 1,523; Referee: Mathias Smehus Kringstad

9 May 2012 Second Round	Verdal	0–2 (a.e.t.)	Molde	Verdalsøra
18:00 CEST (UTC+2)		Summary	Dantas 94'; Berget 112' (pen.)	Stadium: Verdal Stadion; Attendance: 1,750; Referee: Kjetil Thorsø Hansen

20 June 2012 Third Round	Molde	3–2	HamKam	Molde
17:00 CEST (UTC+2)	Berget 15'; Angan 51', 82'	Summary	Gundersen 89'; Solhaug 90+3'	Stadium: Aker Stadion; Attendance: 2,321; Referee: Trygve Kjensli

27 June 2012 Fourth Round	Molde	4–3	Rosenborg	Molde
17:00 CEST (UTC+2)	Angan 39'; Hovland 52'; Hoseth 63' (pen.); Eikrem 89'	Summary	Prica 20'; Rønning 41'; Dočkal 74' (pen.)	Stadium: Aker Stadion; Attendance: 7,327; Referee: Tom Harald Hagen

18 August 2012 Quarter-finals	Molde	2–1	Sandefjord	Molde
16:00 CEST (UTC+2)	Angan 83'; Hoseth 90'	Summary	Aas 65'	Stadium: Aker Stadion; Attendance: 3,928; Referee: Dag Vidar Hafsås

26 September 2012 Semi-finals	Tromsø	2–1	Molde	Tromsø
20:00 CEST (UTC+2)	Ondrášek 3'; Årst 72'	Summary	Chukwu 83'	Stadium: Alfheim Stadion; Attendance: 5,722; Referee: Tommy Skjerven

=== UEFA Champions League ===
==== Qualifying phase ====
18 July 2012 Second qualifying round 1st Leg	Molde (Norway)	3–0	(Latvia) Ventspils	Molde
20:45 CEST (UTC+2)	Angan 53', 83'; Forren 74' (pen.)	Summary; Report		Stadium: Aker Stadion; Attendance: 7,428; Referee: Ivan Kružliak (Slovakia)

24 July 2012 Second qualifying round 2nd Leg	Ventspils (Latvia)	1–1 (1–4 agg.)	(Norway) Molde	Ventspils
17:30 CEST (UTC+2)	Kurakins 24'	Summary; Report	Eikrem 37'	Stadium: Ventspils Olimpiskais Stadions; Attendance: 1,500; Referee: Szymon Marciniak (Poland)

1 August 2012 Third qualifying round 1st Leg	Molde (Norway)	0–1	(Switzerland) Basel	Molde
20:45 CEST (UTC+2)	Angan (red card) 27'	Summary; Report	Zoua 79'	Stadium: Aker Stadion; Attendance: 6,564; Referee: Fredy Fautrel (France)

8 August 2012 Third qualifying round 2nd Leg	Basel (Switzerland)	1–1 (2–1 agg.)	(Norway) Molde	Basel
17:30 CEST (UTC+2)	Degen 75'	Summary; Report	Berget 32'	Stadium: St. Jakob-Park; Attendance: 18,567; Referee: Vladislav Bezborodov (Russia)

=== UEFA Europa League ===
==== Play-off round ====
23 August 2012 1st Leg	Molde (Norway)	2–0	(Netherlands) Heerenveen	Molde
19:00 CEST (UTC+2)	Eikrem 31'; Moström 90'	Summary	Zuiverloon (yellow card) 86'	Stadium: Aker Stadion; Attendance: 4,656; Referee: Cristian Balaj (Romania)

30 August 2012 2nd Leg	Heerenveen (Netherlands)	1–2 (1–4 agg.)	(Norway) Molde	Heerenveen
CEST (UTC+2)	Valpoort 90+2'	Summary; Report	Berget 54'; Diouf 73'	Stadium: Abe Lenstra Stadion; Referee: Stanislav Todorov (Bulgaria)

==== Group stage ====
Pos	Team	Pld	W	D	L	GF	GA	GD	Pts	Qualification
1	(Romania) Steaua București	6	3	2	1	9	9	0	11	Advance to knockout phase
2	(Germany) VfB Stuttgart	6	2	2	2	9	6	+3	8 (Note: Head-to-head points: VfB Stuttgart 4, Copenhagen 1.)	Advance to knockout phase
3	(Denmark) Copenhagen	6	2	2	2	5	6	−1	8	
4	(Norway) Molde	6	2	0	4	6	8	−2	6	

Source: Soccerway
Notes:

20 September 2012 1	Copenhagen (Denmark)	2–1	(Norway) Molde	Copenhagen
19:00 CEST (UTC+2)	Claudemir 20'; Cornelius 74'	Report	Diouf 45+1'	Stadium: Parken Stadium; Attendance: 11,633; Referee: Antti Munukka (Finland)

4 October 2012 2	Molde (Norway)	2–0	(Germany) Stuttgart	Molde
21:05 CEST (UTC+2)	Berget 58'; Chukwu 88'	Report		Stadium: Aker Stadion; Attendance: 4,500; Referee: Kristo Tohver (Estonia)

25 October 2012 3	Steaua București (Romania)	2–0	(Norway) Molde	Bucharest
21:05 CEST (UTC+2)	Chiricheș 30'; Rusescu 32'	Report		Stadium: Arena Națională^{1} Attendance: 43,651; Referee: Laurent Duhamel (France)

8 November 2012 4	Molde (Norway)	1–2	(Romania) Steaua București	Molde
19:00 CET (UTC+1)	Chima 56'	Report	Chipciu 21'; Latovlevici 37'	Stadium: Aker Stadion; Attendance: 5,239; Referee: István Vad (Hungary)

22 November 2012 5	Molde (Norway)	1–2	(Denmark) Copenhagen	Molde
21:05 CET (UTC+1)	Chima 62'	Report	Santin 21' (pen.); Gíslason 76'	Stadium: Aker Stadion; Attendance: 5,740; Referee: Michael Oliver (England)

6 December 2012 6	Stuttgart (Germany)	0–1	(Norway) Molde	Stuttgart
19:00 CET (UTC+1)		Report	Angan 45+1'	Stadium: Mercedes-Benz Arena; Attendance: 17,000; Referee: Kevin Blom (Netherlands)

Notes

- Note 1: Steaua București played their home matches at Arena Națională, Bucharest instead of their regular stadium, Stadionul Steaua, Bucharest.

== Squad statistics ==
=== Appearances and goals ===
No.	Pos	Nat	Player	Total		Tippeligaen		Norwegian Cup		Champions League		Europa League	
No.	Pos	Nat	Player	Apps	Goals	Apps	Goals	Apps	Goals	Apps	Goals	Apps	Goals
1	GK	(Norway) NOR	Espen Bugge Pettersen	35	0	23+0	0	2+0	0	4+0	0	6+0	0
2	DF	(Norway) NOR	Kristoffer Paulsen Vatshaug	33	0	15+6	0	4+0	0	3+0	0	5+0	0
3	DF	(Norway) NOR	Børre Steenslid	9	0	1+4	0	2+0	0	0+0	0	2+0	0
4	DF	(Norway) NOR	Even Hovland	25	2	18+0	1	3+0	1	4+0	0	0+0	0
5	DF	(Norway) NOR	Vegard Forren	43	2	30+0	1	3+0	0	3+0	1	7+0	0
6	DF	(Norway) NOR	Daniel Berg Hestad	37	2	15+9	2	1+2	0	3+1	0	6+0	0
7	MF	(Norway) NOR	Magnus Wolff Eikrem	40	3	26+1	0	3+1	1	3+0	1	6+0	1
9	FW	(Sweden) SWE	Mattias Moström	42	5	23+5	4	4+0	0	4+0	0	4+2	1
10	MF	(Norway) NOR	Magne Hoseth	25	5	13+3	3	4+0	2	1+2	0	1+1	0
11	FW	(Norway) NOR	Jo Inge Berget	43	13	23+5	8	6+0	2	2+0	1	5+2	2
12	GK	(Sweden) SWE	Ole Söderberg	13	0	7+0	0	4+0	0	0+0	0	2+0	0
13	MF	(Norway) NOR	Pål Erik Ulvestad	0	0	0+0	0	0+0	0	0+0	0	0+0	0
14	MF	(Norway) NOR	Martin Linnes	38	0	23+1	0	2+1	0	4+0	0	7+0	0
15	MF	(Norway) NOR	Magnus Stamnestrø	18	3	6+3	1	3+2	2	1+1	0	2+0	0
16	MF	(Norway) NOR	Etzaz Hussain	20	2	6+4	2	1+1	0	0+0	0	3+5	0
17	MF	(Nigeria) NGR	Emmanuel Ekpo	16	0	7+6	0	0+1	0	0+0	0	1+1	0
18	DF	(Norway) NOR	Magne Simonsen	25	1	10+4	1	4+0	0	0+2	0	3+2	0
20	FW	(Ivory Coast) CIV	Davy Claude Angan	40	22	22+4	13	4+2	6	3+0	2	3+2	1
22	MF	(United States) USA	Josh Gatt	31	6	15+5	6	3+0	0	1+0	0	6+1	0
23	DF	(Norway) NOR	Knut Olav Rindarøy	38	0	25+0	0	4+0	0	4+0	0	5+0	0
24	DF	(Norway) NOR	Magnar Ødegaard	4	0	1+1	0	0+0	0	0+0	0	2+0	0
27	FW	(Nigeria) NGR	Daniel Chima Chukwu	39	11	11+14	7	1+2	1	3+1	0	4+3	3
28	MF	(Norway) NOR	Ivar Furu	1	0	0+0	0	0+1	0	0+0	0	0+0	0
29	MF	(Senegal) SEN	Pape Paté Diouf	15	2	8+1	1	0+0	0	0+0	0	4+2	1
32	MF	(Senegal) SEN	Abdou Karim Camara	11	0	1+6	0	3+0	0	0+1	0	0+0	0
33	MF	(Norway) NOR	Andreas Hollingen	1	0	0+0	0	0+0	0	0+0	0	1+0	0
34	MF	(Norway) NOR	Sivert Beinset	1	0	0+0	0	1+0	0	0+0	0	0+0	0
35	DF	(Norway) NOR	Victor Johansen	3	0	0+0	0	2+0	0	0+0	0	1+0	0
38	FW	(Norway) NOR	Eirik Hestad	0	0	0+0	0	0+0	0	0+0	0	0+0	0
Players away from Molde on loan:
21	DF	(Norway) NOR	Krister Wemberg	0	0	0+0	0	0+0	0	0+0	0	0+0	0
25	DF	(United States) USA	Sean Cunningham	0	0	0+0	0	0+0	0	0+0	0	0+0	0
30	MF	(Norway) NOR	Zlatko Tripić	17	0	3+8	0	2+2	0	0+2	0	0+0	0
Players who appeared for Molde no longer at the club:
26	GK	(Norway) NOR	Elias Valderhaug	0	0	0+0	0	0+0	0	0+0	0	0+0	0
8	MF	(Senegal) SEN	Makhtar Thioune	0	0	0+0	0	0+0	0	0+0	0	0+0	0
19	FW	(Brazil) BRA	Vini Dantas	4	1	1+0	0	0+2	1	0+1	0	0+0	0

=== Goal scorers ===
Place	Position	Nation	Number	Name	Tippeligaen	Norwegian Cup	Champions League	Europa League	Total
1	FW	(Ivory Coast)	20	Davy Claude Angan	13	6	2	1	22
2	FW	(Norway)	11	Jo Inge Berget	8	2	1	2	13
3	FW	(Nigeria)	27	Daniel Chima Chukwu	7	1	0	3	11
4	MF	(United States)	22	Joshua Gatt	6	0	0	0	6
5	MF	(Norway)	10	Magne Hoseth	3	2	0	0	5
6	FW	(Sweden)	9	Mattias Moström	4	0	0	1	5
7	MF	(Norway)	7	Magnus Wolff Eikrem	0	1	1	1	3
7	MF	(Senegal)	29	Pape Paté Diouf	1	0	0	2	3
9	MF	(Norway)	16	Etzaz Hussain	2	0	0	0	2
9	MF	(Norway)	15	Magnus Stamnestrø	0	2	0	0	2
9	MF	(Norway)	4	Even Hovland	1	1	0	0	2
9	DF	(Norway)	5	Vegard Forren	1	0	1	0	2
9	MF	(Norway)	6	Daniel Berg Hestad	2	0	0	0	2
14	FW	(Norway)	14	Martin Linnes	1	0	0	0	1
14	DF	(Norway)	18	Magne Simonsen	1	0	0	0	1
14	FW	(Brazil)	33	Vini Dantas	0	1	0	0	1
				TOTALS	51	16	5	9	81

=== Disciplinary record ===
Number	Nation	Position	Name	Tippeligaen		Norwegian Cup		Champions League		Europa League		Total	
Number	Nation	Position	Name	Yellow card	Red card	Yellow card	Red card	Yellow card	Red card	Yellow card	Red card	Yellow card	Red card
2	(Norway)	DF	Kristoffer Paulsen Vatshaug	2	0	0	0	0	0	0	0	2	0
4	(Norway)	DF	Even Hovland	0	0	2	0	1	0	0	0	3	0
5	(Norway)	DF	Vegard Forren	2	0	1	0	1	0	2	0	6	0
6	(Norway)	DF	Daniel Berg Hestad	2	0	0	0	0	0	0	0	2	0
7	(Norway)	MF	Magnus Wolff Eikrem	5	0	0	0	0	0	1	0	6	0
9	(Sweden)	FW	Mattias Moström	2	0	1	0	0	0	1	0	4	0
10	(Norway)	MF	Magne Hoseth	2	0	0	0	0	0	0	0	2	0
11	(Norway)	FW	Jo Inge Berget	1	0	0	0	0	0	0	0	1	0
14	(Norway)	MF	Martin Linnes	1	0	1	0	0	0	0	0	2	0
16	(Norway)	MF	Etzaz Hussain	2	0	0	0	0	0	1	0	3	0
17	(Nigeria)	MF	Emmanuel Ekpo	1	0	0	0	0	0	0	0	1	0
18	(Norway)	DF	Magne Simonsen	1	0	0	0	0	0	1	0	2	0
20	(Ivory Coast)	FW	Davy Claude Angan	2	0	0	0	0	1	0	0	2	1
22	(United States)	MF	Josh Gatt	4	0	1	0	0	0	2	0	7	0
23	(Norway)	DF	Knut Olav Rindarøy	2	0	0	0	0	0	0	0	2	0
24	(Norway)	DF	Magnar Ødegaard	1	0	0	0	0	0	0	0	1	0
27	(Nigeria)	FW	Daniel Chima Chukwu	1	0	0	0	0	0	0	0	1	0
29	(Senegal)	MF	Pape Paté Diouf	2	0	0	0	0	0	0	0	2	0
30	(Norway)	MF	Zlatko Tripić	1	0	1	0	0	0	0	0	2	0
32	(Senegal)	MF	Abdou Karim Camara	0	0	0	0	1	0	1	0	2	0
			TOTALS	35	0	7	0	3	1	9	0	54	1

== See also ==
- Molde FK seasons
