= 2011 Molde FK season =

Molde
2011 season
- Chairman: Erik Berg
- Manager: Ole Gunnar Solskjær
- Stadium: Aker Stadion
- Tippeligaen: 1st (champions)
- Norwegian Cup: Quarter-final vs Fredrikstad
- Top goalscorer: League: Pape Paté Diouf (12); All: Pape Paté Diouf (13)
- Highest home attendance: 11,292 vs Aalesund (3 July 2011)
- Lowest home attendance: 8,158 vs Fredrikstad (19 May 2011)
- Average home league attendance: 9,716
Home colours	Away colours	Third colours

The 2011 season was Molde's 4th consecutive year in Tippeligaen, and their 35th season in the top flight of Norwegian football. Molde became league champions for the first time in club history.

Molde FK's U19 squad played in the inaugural tournament of the NextGen series.

== Season events ==
=== June ===
Start. In Drammen, Molde won 1–0 against Strømsgodset. Pape Paté Diouf scored the game's only goal in the 13th minute. 19 June marked Molde's 100th anniversary and saw Molde play against Sogndal. Molde won with the score 2–0, their third consecutive league game for the first time this season, after goals scored by Pape Paté Diouf and Magne Hoseth. Molde played with a retro kit with blue and white vertical stripes, which was a copy of Molde's kits from 1914. The win made sure Molde overtook the leading position in the league for the first time in the 2011 Tippeligaen season, a lead the team hold onto until the end of the season. Molde advanced to the quarter-finals of the Norwegian Cup through a 3–1 win at Aker Stadion against Hønefoss in the Fourth Round. A three-game winning streak ended on 26 June, when Molde lost 0–1 away to Odd Grenland. Molde won their fifth game in June, out of six possible, when they won 2–1 away against Vålerenga on 29 June.

=== July ===
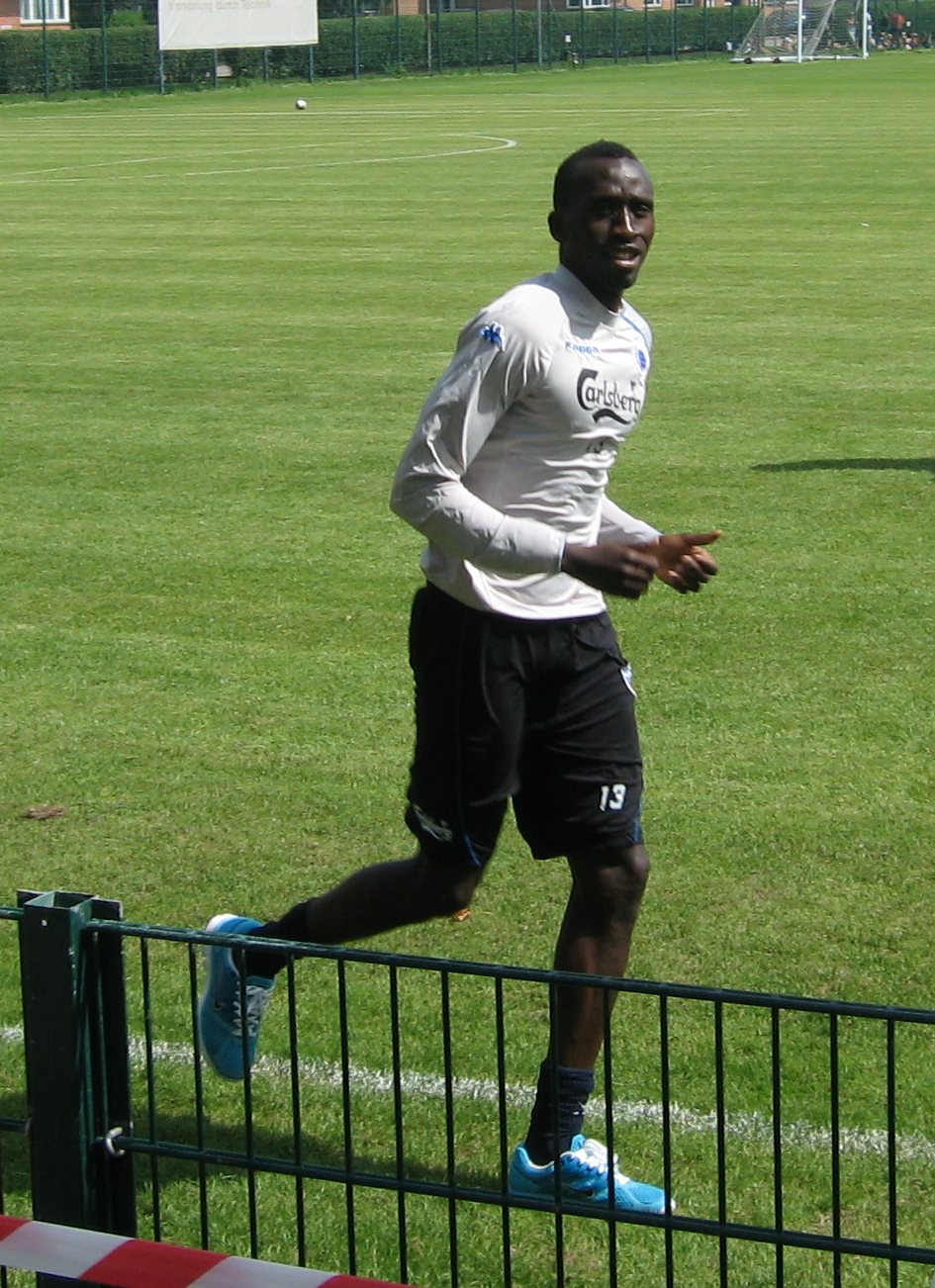
Pape Paté Diouf scored four goals against Aalesund before leaving the club to join FC Copenhagen.

Pape Paté Diouf scored four goals against Aalesund on 3 July when Molde continued to show great league form with a 5–2 win against their Møre og Romsdal rivals. The game was Diouf's last before his departure to Danish side FC Copenhagen nine days later. They avenged the 0–5 loss against Haugesund with a 3–1 win at Aker Stadion on 17 July. Daniel Chima Chukwu gave the home team an early lead before Mattias Moström scored twice. Molde were supposed to play against Start in Kristiansand on 22 July, but this match was postponed to 4 August due to the 2011 Norway attacks. Vålerenga were beaten for the second time in just over a month when Molde won 2–1 at home on 30 July.

=== August ===
Molde won the postponed match away to Start with the score 2–1, their fifth consecutive league win. Start took the lead early in the second half through a goal from Ole Martin Årst, then Molde turned the game around in eleven minutes with goals from Chima Chukwu and Joshua Gatt. Magne Hoseth gave the team a lead at Lerkendal Stadion on 7 August, but Rosenborg scored a controversial goal only five minutes later. Simen Wangberg scored with his hand, a goal Molde manager Solskjær described as an ugly goal which was incompatible with fair play. Two goals from Rade Prica in the second half made sure Molde had to leave Trondheim with a 1–3 defeat. They were eliminated from the Norwegian Cup on 14 August when Fredrikstad won 3–2 after extra time in the quarter-final stage at Fredrikstad Stadion. Eikrem and Angan turned a 0–1 deficit, but Amin Askar equalised late in the second half. Etzaz Hussain won the game for the home side with his goal in the 117th minute. On 22 August, Magnus Wolff Eikrem scored the only goal of the game against Lillestrøm at Aker Stadion. Molde went to Ålesund on 28 August and continued their good form with a 3–1 win, their eighth out of the last ten in the league. Gatt scored Molde's first goal in the opening minute, followed by goals from Hoseth and Makhtar Thioune. Magnus Sylling Olsen scored Aalesund's consolation goal in the last minute. By the end of August, the team's good results led to an eight points gap, although with one more game to play, down to runners-up Tromsø.

=== September ===
The home game against Brann on 11 September ended with a 2–2 draw, but was best remembered for the kick-off being 75 minutes delayed due to problems with the floodlights. Brann could have protested and received three points without playing the game, but chose not to, a decision praised by Solskjær. The 2–2 draw was a result of a brace from Eikrem in the first half and two goals from Lars Grorud in the second half, the last in stoppage time. Angan scored the winner in Molde's 1–0 away win against Fredrikstad on 17 September. Molde's game against Viking on Aker Stadion on 23 September ended with a goalless draw.

=== October–November ===
On 2 October, they took three points away from home as Tromsø were defeated at Alfheim Stadion. Within a few minutes after the 30th-minute mark, Forren and Berget were the goalscorers. Then followed a streak of draws that lasted three games; 0–0 at home against Odd Grenland, 1–1 away against Stabæk, and a 2–2 draw in what was a potentially league-defining game against Strømsgodset. On 30 October, before the match against Strømsgodset in the third-to-last game of the season, it was clear that Molde would become champions if they won. A tense first half ended goalless. In the second half, Magne Simonsen gave Molde the lead, but the goal was immediately equalised by Ola Kamara. In the 70th minute, Eikrem scored and Molde seemed to have won the league. Right before stoppage time, Anders Konradsen scored after a corner and equalised for Strømsgodset. The draw meant that Molde had to await the result from the game played later the same evening at Lerkendal Stadion between Rosenborg and Brann before they could know if they became champions or not that day. Brann took an early 3–0 lead and won the game 6–3. Rosenborg could no longer achieve the number of points needed to win the league and Molde were champions. Club captain Daniel Berg Hestad lifted the trophy at the home ground after Molde's 3–1 win against Sarpsborg 08 on 20 November. Angan, Vini Dantas and Simonsen scored the goals for Molde. The season ended with a 1–2 defeat away to Sogndal. Zlatko Tripic scored Molde's last goal of the season, while Tore André Flo scored both for Sogndal.

== Squad ==
As of 18 August 2011

Note: Flags indicate national team as defined under FIFA eligibility rules; some limited exceptions apply. Players may hold more than one non-FIFA nationality.

No.	Pos.	Nation	Player
1	GK	NOR	Espen Bugge Pettersen
2	DF	NOR	Kristoffer Paulsen Vatshaug
5	DF	NOR	Vegard Forren
6	MF	NOR	Daniel Berg Hestad (Captain)
7	MF	NOR	Magnus Wolff Eikrem
8	MF	SEN	Makhtar Thioune
9	MF	SWE	Mattias Moström
10	MF	NOR	Magne Hoseth
11	FW	NOR	Jo Inge Berget
12	GK	NOR	Knut Dørum Lillebakk
13	MF	NOR	Pål Erik Ulvestad
14	DF	NOR	Christian Steen
15	MF	NOR	Magnus Stamnestrø
17	DF	NOR	Børre Steenslid

No.	Pos.	Nation	Player
18	DF	NOR	Magne Simonsen
19	FW	BRA	José Mota
20	FW	CIV	Davy Claude Angan
21	DF	NOR	Krister Wemberg
22	MF	USA	Josh Gatt
23	DF	NOR	Knut Olav Rindarøy
25	DF	USA	Sean Cunningham
26	GK	NOR	Elias Valderhaug
27	FW	NGR	Daniel Chima Chukwu
30	MF	NOR	Zlatko Tripić
31	MF	SEN	Mamadou Gando Ba
32	MF	SEN	Abdou Karim Camara
33	FW	BRA	Vini Dantas

=== Players on loan ===
Note: Flags indicate national team as defined under FIFA eligibility rules; some limited exceptions apply. Players may hold more than one non-FIFA nationality.

No.	Pos.	Nation	Player
4	MF	NOR	Thomas Holm (on loan to Tromsø)
16	DF	NOR	Jacob Falch Meidell (on loan to Kristiansund)

No.	Pos.	Nation	Player
24	DF	NOR	Torjus Aaland (on loan to Kristiansund)

== Transfers ==
=== In ===
Date	Position	Nationality	Name	From	Fee
12 January 2011	FW	(Ivory Coast)	Davy Claude Angan	(Norway) Hønefoss	Undisclosed
12 January 2011	MF	(United States)	Joshua Gatt	(Austria) SC Rheindorf Altach	Undisclosed
12 January 2011	MF	(Norway)	Magnus Wolff Eikrem	(England) Manchester United	Undisclosed
13 January 2011	DF	(Norway)	Børre Steenslid	(Norway) Viking	Undisclosed
18 January 2011	DF	(Norway)	Torjus Aaland	(Norway) Stranda	Undisclosed
24 January 2011	DF	(United States)	Sean Cunningham	Derby County Wolves Soccer Club	Undisclosed
11 February 2011	MF	(Norway)	Pål Erik Ulvestad	(Norway) Herd	Undisclosed
28 July 2011	MF	(Norway)	Jo Inge Berget	(Italy) Udinese	Undisclosed
2 August 2011	MF	(Norway)	Zlatko Tripić	(Norway) Egersund	Unknown
31 August 2011	FW	(Brazil)	Vini Dantas		

=== Out ===
Date	Position	Nationality	Name	To	Fee
January 2011	MF	(Norway)	Aksel Berget Skjølsvik	(Norway) Sandnes Ulf	
January 2011	DF	(Norway)	Øyvind Gjerde	Retired	
January 2011	DF	(Sweden)	Marcus Andreasson	(Belgium) Lierse	
January 2011	MF	(Norway)	Kristian Strandhagen	(Norway) Kristiansund	
January 2011	GK	(Norway)	Jan Kjell Larsen	(Norway) Stabæk	
January 2011	FW	(Senegal)	Mame Mbar Diouf	(Norway) Sandnes Ulf	
30 June 2011	DF	(Sweden)	Emil Johansson	(Netherlands) Groningen	€500K
Summer 2011	FW	(Senegal)	Pape Paté Diouf	(Denmark) Copenhagen	

=== Loan out ===
Date from	Date to	Position	Nationality	Name	To
1 March 2011	1 November 2011	DF	(Norway)	Jacob Falch Meidell	(Norway) Kristiansund
1 March 2011	1 November 2011	DF	(Norway)	Torjus Aaland	(Norway) Kristiansund
1 August 2011	31 December 2011	MF	(Norway)	Thomas Holm	(Norway) Tromsø

== Coaching staff ==
Manager	Ole Gunnar Solskjær
Coach	Mark Dempsey
Goalkeeper coach	Richard Hartis

== Pre-season games ==
=== Copa del Sol ===
28 January 2011	Molde (Norway)	1–1 (3–4 p)	(Ukraine) Karpaty Lviv	Elche, Spain
19.00 CET	Angan 30'		Kozhanov 24' (pen.)	Stadium: Estadio Martínez Valero
	Penalties
	Diouf (penalty scored); Steen (penalty scored); Angan (penalty scored); Ulvestad (penalty missed); Holm (penalty missed)		(penalty scored) Guruli; (penalty scored) Oshchypko; (penalty scored) Tkachuk; (penalty scored) Tubić

31 January 2011	Molde (Norway)	1–5	(Norway) Tromsø	La Manga, Spain
13.00 CET	Hoseth 56'		Johansen 15'; Møller 25'; Björck 31'; Knarvik 64'; Andersen 81'	Stadium: La Manga Stadium

3 February 2011	Wisła Kraków (Poland)	0–2	(Norway) Molde	L'Alfàs del Pi, Spain
15.00 CET			Diouf 44'; Eikrem 59'	Stadium: Polideportivo

== Competitions ==
=== Tippeligaen ===
See also 2011 Tippeligaen

==== Results summary ====
Overall								Home						Away					
Pld	W	D	L	GF	GA	GD	Pts	W	D	L	GF	GA	GD	W	D	L	GF	GA	GD
30	17	7	6	54	38	+16	58	9	5	1	32	17	+15	8	2	5	22	21	+1

Last updated: 21 August 2011.
Source: fotball.no

==== Results by round ====
Round	1	2	3	4	5	6	7	8	9	10	11	12	13	14	15	16	17	18	19	20	21	22	23	24	25	26	27	28	29	30
Ground	A	H	A	H	A	H	A	H	A	H	A	H	A	A	H	H	H	A	A	H	A	H	A	H	A	H	A	H	H	A
Result	L	D	D	W	W	L	W	W	L	W	W	W	L	W	W	W	W	W	L	W	W	D	W	D	W	D	D	D	W	L
Position	15	13	14	10	8	10	7	4	5	5	2	1	2	1	1	1	1	1	1	1	1	1	1	1	1	1	1	1	1	1

Updated to match(es) played on 31 October 2011. Source: see below
A = Away; H = Home; W = Win; D = Draw; L = Loss

==== Fixtures & results ====
18 March 2011 1	Sarpsborg 08	3–0	Molde	Sarpsborg
19:00 CET	Wiig 53'; Matland 56'; Hoås 74'	Soccerway Summary; NFF Report		Stadium: Sarpsborg Stadion; Attendance: 4,542; Referee: Svein-Erik Edvartsen

3 April 2011 2	Molde	2–2	Tromsø	Molde
18:00 CEST	Diouf 16'; Angan 56'	Soccerway Summary; NFF Report	Rushfeldt 3'; Kara 58'	Stadium: Aker Stadion; Attendance: 8,782; Referee: Tommy Skjerven

11 April 2011 3	Viking	2–2	Molde	Stavanger
19:00 CEST	Nevland 31'; Berisha 36'	Soccerway Summary; NFF Report	Angan 5', 78'	Stadium: Viking Stadion; Attendance: 10,105; Referee: Dag Vidar Hafsås

17 April 2011 4	Molde	3–2	Stabæk	Molde
18:00 CEST	Angan 32'; Diouf 45'; Thioune 71'	Soccerway Summary; NFF Report	Gunnarsson 70', 75'	Stadium: Aker Stadion; Attendance: 9,112; Referee: Ken Henry Johnsen

25 April 2011 5	Brann	1–3	Molde	Bergen
18:00 CEST	Mjelde 67'	Soccerway Summary; NFF Report	Diouf 10', 22'; Chima 90+3'	Stadium: Brann Stadion; Attendance: 12,537; Referee: Brage Sandmoen

8 May 2011 6	Molde	0–2	Rosenborg	Molde
20:00 CEST		Soccerway Summary; NFF Report	Larsen 40'; Prica 90+2'	Stadium: Aker Stadion; Attendance: 11,210; Referee: Espen Berntsen

16 May 2011 7	Lillestrøm	0–3	Molde	Lillestrøm
18:00 CEST		Soccerway Summary; NFF Report	Hoseth 38' (pen.); Kippe 54' (o.g.); Moström 70'	Stadium: Åråsen Stadion; Attendance: 8,852; Referee: Svein Oddvar Moen

19 May 2011 8	Molde	2–1	Fredrikstad	Molde
19:00 CEST	Holm 10'; Chima 16'	Soccerway Summary; NFF Report	Elyounoussi 55'	Stadium: Aker Stadion; Attendance: 8,158; Referee: Trond Ivar Døvle

29 May 2011 10	Haugesund	5–0	Molde	Haugesund
18:00 CEST	Søderlund 8'; Diouf 22' (o.g.); Sørum 39', 52'; Đurđić 58'	Soccerway Summary; NFF Report		Stadium: Haugesund stadion Attendance: 4,287; Referee: Kristoffer Helgerud

13 June 2011 11	Molde	5–1	Start	Molde
18:00 CEST	Diouf 7', 24'; Angan 13'; Thioune 76'; Chima 82'	Soccerway Summary; NFF Report	Børufsen 48'	Stadium: Aker Stadion; Attendance: 8,702; Referee: Dag Vidar Hafsås

16 June 2011 12	Strømsgodset	0–1	Molde	Drammen
19:00 CEST		Soccerway Summary; NFF Report	Diouf 13'	Stadium: Marienlyst Stadion; Attendance: 6,022; Referee: Brage Sandmoen

19 June 2011 13	Molde	2–0	Sogndal	Molde
16:00 CEST	Diouf 41'; Hoseth 79'	Soccerway Summary; NFF Report		Stadium: Aker Stadion; Attendance: 10,755; Referee: Anders Johansen

26 June 2011 14	Odd Grenland	1–0	Molde	Skien
18:00 CEST	Johnsen 90+2'	Soccerway Summary; NFF Report		Stadium: Skagerak Arena; Attendance: 5,721; Referee: Svein-Erik Edvartsen

29 June 2011 (Note: Match was postponed from 22 May 2011 due to the player strike.) 9	Vålerenga	1–2	Molde	Oslo
20:00 CEST	Ogude 45'	Soccerway Summary; NFF Report		Stadium: Ullevaal Stadion; Attendance: 15,659; Referee: Kristoffer Helgerud

3 July 2011 15	Molde	5–2	Aalesund	Molde
20:00 CEST	Diouf 11', 79', 87', 90+4'; Thioune 28'	Soccerway Summary; NFF Report	Sellin 13'; Phillips 84' (pen.)	Stadium: Aker Stadion; Attendance: 11,292; Referee: Tom Henning Øvrebø

17 July 2011 16	Molde	3–1	Haugesund	Molde
18:00 CEST	Chima 12'; Moström 15', 63'	Soccerway Summary; NFF Report	Andreassen 78'	Stadium: Aker Stadion; Attendance: 11,032; Referee: Trond Ivar Døvle

30 July 2011 18	Molde	2–1	Vålerenga	Molde
18:00 CEST	Hoseth 43'; Gatt 61'	Soccerway Summary; NFF Report	Singh 85'	Stadium: Aker Stadion; Attendance: 9,933; Referee: Dag Vidar Hafsås

4 August 2011 (Note: Match was postponned from 22 July 2011 due to the 2011 Norway attacks.) 17	Start	1–2	Molde	Kristiansand
19:00 CEST	Årst 51'	Soccerway Summary; NFF Report	Chima 53'; Gatt 62'	Stadium: Sør Arena; Attendance: 7,147; Referee: Svein Oddvar Moen

7 August 2011 19	Rosenborg	3–1	Molde	Trondheim
20:00 CEST	Wangberg 33'; Prica 66', 74'	Soccerway Summary; NFF Report	Hoseth 28'	Stadium: Lerkendal Stadion; Attendance: 17,656; Referee: Svein-Erik Edvartsen

22 August 2011 20	Molde	1–0	Lillestrøm	Molde
19:00 CEST	Eikrem 29'	Soccerway Summary; NFF Report		Stadium: Aker Stadion; Attendance: 8,856; Referee: Ken Henry Johnsen

28 August 2011 21	Aalesund	1–3	Molde	Ålesund
20:00 CEST	Olsen 90'	Soccerway Summary; NFF Report	Gatt 1'; Hoseth 27'; Thioune 75'	Stadium: Color Line Stadion; Attendance: 10,677; Referee: Espen Berntsen

11 September 2011 22	Molde	2–2	Brann	Molde
21:15 CEST (Note: Match was delayed 75 minutes, because of problems with the floodlights.)	Eikrem 9', 37'	Soccerway Summary; NFF Report	Grorud 66', 90+1'	Stadium: Aker Stadion; Attendance: 9,131; Referee: Svein Oddvar Moen

17 September 2011 23	Fredrikstad	0–1	Molde	Fredrikstad
18:00 CEST		Soccerway Summary; NFF Report	Angan 58'	Stadium: Fredrikstad Stadion; Attendance: 7,388; Referee: Tommy Skjerven

23 September 2011 24	Molde	0–0	Viking	Molde
19:00 CEST		Soccerway Summary; NFF Report		Stadium: Aker Stadion; Attendance: 8,738; Referee: Kristoffer Helgerud

2 October 2011 25	Tromsø	0–2	Molde	Tromsø
20:00 CEST		Soccerway Summary; NFF Report	Forren 30'; Berget 36'	Stadium: Alfheim Stadion; Attendance: 6,535; Referee: Svein-Erik Edvartsen

16 October 2011 26	Molde	0–0	Odd Grenland	Molde
18:00 CEST		Soccerway Summary; NFF Report		Stadium: Aker Stadion; Attendance: 9,095; Referee: Svein Oddvar Moen

21 October 2011 27	Stabæk	1–1	Molde	Bærum
19:00 CEST	Ollé Ollé 55'	Soccerway Summary; NFF Report	Berget 20'	Stadium: Fornebu Arena; Attendance: 11,930; Referee: Tommy Skjerven

30 October 2011 28	Molde	2–2	Strømsgodset	Molde
18:00 CET	Simonsen 57'; Eikrem 70'	Soccerway Summary; NFF Report	Kamara 58'; Konradsen 90'	Stadium: Aker Stadion; Attendance: 11,239; Referee: Kjetil Sælen

20 November 2011 29	Molde	3–1	Sarpsborg 08	Molde
18:00 CET	Angan 12'; Vini Dantas 19'; Simonsen 65'	NFF Report; Soccerway	Giæver 33'	Stadium: Aker Stadion; Attendance: 11,218; Referee: Tore Hansen

27 November 2011 30	Sogndal	2–1	Molde	Sogndalsfjøra
18:00 CET	Flo 39', 56'	NFF Report	Tripic 16'	Stadium: Fosshaugane Campus; Attendance: 3,254; Referee: Trond Ivar Døvle

==== League table ====
Pos	Team	Pld	W	D	L	GF	GA	GD	Pts	Qualification or relegation
1	Molde (C)	30	17	7	6	54	38	+16	58	Qualification for the Champions League second qualifying round
2	Tromsø	30	15	8	7	56	34	+22	53	Qualification for the Europa League second qualifying round
3	Rosenborg	30	14	7	9	69	44	+25	49	Qualification for the Europa League first qualifying round
4	Brann	30	14	6	10	51	49	+2	48	
5	Odd Grenland	30	14	6	10	44	44	0	48	

Source: fotball.no
Rules for classification: 1) points; 2) goal difference; 3) number of goals scored.
(C) Champions

=== Norwegian Cup ===
1 May 2011 First Round	Eidsvåg	0–11	Molde	Eidsvåg
18:00 CEST		Report	Moström 2', 11'; Chima 14', 17', 59', 82'; Mota 19', 69' (pen.), 80'; Steen 22'; Furu (yellow card) 61'; Holm 71'	Stadium: Eidsvåg Kunstgress; Attendance: 1,800; Referee: Sigurd Smehus Kringstad

11 May 2011 Second Round	Træff	0–2	Molde	Molde
18:00 CEST	S.Rødal (yellow card) 59'; A.K.Brakstad (yellow card) 81'	Report	Chima 27', 75'; Cunningham (yellow card) 60'; Hoseth (yellow card) 61'	Stadium: Reknesbanen; Attendance: 1,100; Referee: Sigurd Smehus Kringstad

25 May 2011 Third Round	Tiller	1–7	Molde	Trondheim
18:00 CEST	Torset 81'	Report	Chima 17'; Stamnestrø (yellow card) 27'; Mota 35', 55', 74'; Gatt 39', 52'; Moström 40'	Stadium: Tonstad Kunstgress; Attendance: 1,261; Referee: Bjørn Hansen

22 June 2011 Fourth Round	Molde	3–1	Hønefoss	Molde
18:00 CEST	Angan 72'; Diouf 77'; Sigurðsson 85' (o.g.)	Report	Jensen 2'; Olsen (yellow card) 34'; Haugen (yellow card) 74'	Stadium: Aker Stadion; Attendance: 2,461; Referee: Trond Ivar Døvle

14 August 2011 Quarter-final	Fredrikstad	3–2 (a.e.t.)	Molde	Fredrikstad
16:00 CEST	Borges 15'; Askar 81'; Hussain 117'	Report	Forren (yellow card) 32'; Hoseth (yellow card) 34'; Eikrem 41'; Angan 45'; Gatt (yellow card) 120'	Stadium: Fredrikstad Stadion; Attendance: 5,265; Referee: Kjetil Sælen

== Squad statistics ==
=== Appearances and goals ===
As of 1 November 2011

No.	Pos	Nat	Player	Total		Tippeligaen		Norwegian Cup	
No.	Pos	Nat	Player	Apps	Goals	Apps	Goals	Apps	Goals
1	GK	(Norway) NOR	Espen Bugge Pettersen	29	0	28+0	0	1+0	0
2	DF	(Norway) NOR	Kristoffer Paulsen Vatshaug	29	0	26+0	0	3+0	0
5	DF	(Norway) NOR	Vegard Forren	31	1	29+0	1	1+1	0
6	DF	(Norway) NOR	Daniel Berg Hestad	31	0	17+11	0	3+0	0
7	MF	(Norway) NOR	Magnus Wolff Eikrem	31	5	26+2	4	1+2	1
8	MF	(Senegal) SEN	Makhtar Thioune	27	4	22+5	4	0+0	0
9	FW	(Sweden) SWE	Mattias Moström	32	6	19+8	3	5+0	3
10	MF	(Norway) NOR	Magne Hoseth	28	5	22+3	5	3+0	0
11	FW	(Norway) NOR	Jo Inge Berget	10	2	8+2	2	0+0	0
12	GK	(Norway) NOR	Knut Dørum Lillebakk	1	0	0+0	0	0+1	0
13	MF	(Norway) NOR	Pål Erik Ulvestad	16	0	4+7	0	2+3	0
14	DF	(Norway) NOR	Christian Steen	9	2	6+0	1	3+0	1
15	MF	(Norway) NOR	Magnus Stamnestrø	8	0	1+3	0	2+2	0
18	DF	(Norway) NOR	Magne Simonsen	31	2	23+4	2	4+0	0
19	FW	(Brazil) BRA	José Mota	8	6	0+5	0	3+0	6
20	FW	(Ivory Coast) CIV	Davy Claude Angan	31	11	27+2	9	2+0	2
21	DF	(Norway) NOR	Krister Wemberg	6	0	3+0	0	3+0	0
22	MF	(United States) USA	Josh Gatt	27	5	14+8	3	5+0	2
23	DF	(Norway) NOR	Knut Olav Rindarøy	14	0	12+0	0	1+1	0
25	DF	(United States) USA	Sean Cunningham	3	0	0+0	0	3+0	0
26	GK	(Norway) NOR	Elias Valderhaug	6	0	2+0	0	4+0	0
27	FW	(Nigeria) NGR	Daniel Chima Chukwu	29	12	13+11	5	4+1	7
28	MF	(Norway) NOR	Ivar Furu	1	0	0+0	0	0+1	0
30	MF	(Norway) NOR	Zlatko Tripić	11	1	9+1	1	0+1	0
30	MF	(Senegal) SEN	Abdou Karim Camara	1	0	0+1	0	0+0	0
33	FW	(Brazil) BRA	Vini Dantas	6	1	2+3	1	0+1	0
Players who appeared for Molde no longer at the club:
3	DF	(Sweden) SWE	Emil Johansson	8	0	7+0	0	0+1	0
4	MF	(Norway) NOR	Thomas Holm	10	2	3+5	1	2+0	1
11	FW	(Senegal) SEN	Pape Paté Diouf	15	13	14+0	12	0+1	1

=== Goal scorers ===
Place	Position	Nation	Number	Name	Tippeligaen	Norwegian Cup	Total
1	FW	(Senegal)	11	Pape Paté Diouf	12	1	13
2	FW	(Nigeria)	27	Daniel Chima Chukwu	5	7	12
3	FW	(Ivory Coast)	20	Davy Claude Angan	9	2	11
4	FW	(Brazil)	19	José Mota	0	6	6
4	MF	(Sweden)	9	Mattias Moström	3	3	6
6	MF	(Norway)	10	Magne Hoseth	5	0	5
6	MF	(Norway)	7	Magnus Eikrem	4	1	5
6	MF	(United States)	22	Joshua Gatt	3	2	5
9	MF	(Senegal)	8	Makhtar Thioune	4	0	4
10	DF	(Norway)	4	Thomas Holm	1	1	2
10	FW	(Norway)	11	Jo Inge Berget	2	0	2
10	DF	(Norway)	18	Magne Simonsen	2	0	2
10				Own goal	1	1	2
12	DF	(Norway)	5	Vegard Forren	1	0	1
12	FW	(Brazil)	33	Vini Dantas	1	0	1
12	FW	(Norway)	30	Zlatko Tripić	1	0	1
12	DF	(Norway)	14	Christian Steen	0	1	1
				TOTALS	54	25	79

=== Disciplinary record ===
Number	Nation	Position	Name	Tippeligaen		Norwegian Cup		Total	
Number	Nation	Position	Name	Yellow card	Red card	Yellow card	Red card	Yellow card	Red card
2	(Norway)	DF	Kristoffer Paulsen Vatshaug	2	1	0	0	2	0
3	(Sweden)	DF	Emil Johansson	1	0	0	0	1	0
4	(Norway)	DF	Thomas Holm	1	0	0	0	1	0
5	(Norway)	DF	Vegard Forren	5	0	1	0	6	0
6	(Norway)	FW	Daniel Berg Hestad	1	0	0	0	1	0
7	(Norway)	FW	Magnus Wolff Eikrem	2	0	0	0	2	0
8	(Senegal)	MF	Makhtar Thioune	4	0	0	0	4	0
9	(Sweden)	FW	Mattias Moström	1	0	0	0	1	0
10	(Norway)	MF	Magne Hoseth	5	0	2	0	7	0
11	(Senegal)	FW	Pape Paté Diouf	3	0	0	0	3	0
13	(Norway)	FW	Pål Erik Ulvestad	2	0	0	0	2	0
14	(Norway)	DF	Christian Steen	2	0	0	0	2	0
15	(Norway)	MF	Magnus Stamnestrø	0	0	1	0	1	0
18	(Norway)	FW	Magne Simonsen	2	0	0	0	2	0
19	(Brazil)	FW	José Mota	1	0	0	0	1	0
20	(Ivory Coast)	FW	Davy Claude Angan	3	0	0	0	3	0
22	(United States)	MF	Josh Gatt	1	0	1	0	2	0
23	(Norway)	FW	Knut Olav Rindarøy	2	0	0	0	2	0
25	(United States)	DF	Sean Cunningham	0	0	1	0	1	0
27	(Nigeria)	FW	Daniel Chima Chukwu	1	0	0	0	1	0
30	(Norway)	FW	Zlatko Tripić	1	0	0	0	1	0
	(Norway)	MF	Ivar Erlien Furu	0	0	1	0	1	0
			TOTALS	40	1	7	0	47	1

== Team kit ==
This season's kits were produced by Umbro with Sparebanken Møre as the shirt sponsor. On 19 June 2011, in the Tippeliga-match against Sogndal, Molde played with a retro kit, which was a copy of Molde's kits from 1914, due to Molde's 100-year anniversary.

Home	Retro kit	Away	Third

== See also ==
- Molde FK seasons
