= 2013 Molde FK season =

Molde
2013 season
- Chairman: Øystein Neerland
- Manager: Ole Gunnar Solskjær
- Stadium: Aker Stadion
- Tippeligaen: 6th
- Norwegian Cup: Winners
- Champions League: Third qualifying round vs Legia Warsaw
- Europa League: Play-off round vs Rubin Kazan
- Top goalscorer: League: Daniel Chima (9); All: Daniel Chima (13)
- Highest home attendance: 11,074 vs Aalesund (9 May 2013)
- Lowest home attendance: 4,380 vs Ranheim (19 June 2013)
- Average home league attendance: 7,901
Home colours	Away colours	Third colours

The 2013 season was Molde's sixth consecutive year in Tippeligaen, and their 37th season in the top flight of Norwegian football. It was Ole Gunnar Solskjær's third season as the club's manager. Molde were the defending champions in Tippeligaen, but lost their first four matches in the league and collected six points in the first ten games. The team did however turn the bad form, and finished the season in sixth place. The team won the 2013 Norwegian Football Cup, after defeating their main rivals Rosenborg 4–2 in the final. In Europe, Molde entered the UEFA Champions League in the second qualifying round, where they defeated Sligo Rovers. In the next round, the team was eliminated by Legia Warszawa on away goals. Molde proceeded to the Europe League play-off round, where they were knocked out by Rubin Kazan.

== Season summary ==
Molde started the season poorly, losing their first four games. Their first point of the season came on 20 April 2013 in a 1–1 draw away to Odds, with Molde's goal coming from Daniel Berg Hestad. Molde's first victory of season came in the first round of the Norwegian Cup away to Elnesvågen. They won 0-5 with the goals coming from new signings Aliou Coly, four, and Agnaldo. Their first league win of the season was a 4–1 victory against Aalesunds on 9 May 2013, with Joona Toivio, Magnus Wolff Eikrem and Jo Inge Berget scoring the goals. Molde then went on a 3-game winless streak that included a 1–5 defeat to Haugesund, their worst loss at home since Tromsø won 7–0 against Molde on 2 September 1995. This was also Molde's first ever loss against Haugesund at home.

Molde's second league victory came in their 12th game of the season, a 4–0 home defeat of Hønefoss that saw Molde rise off the bottom of the table for the first time all season. Molde had 4 players called up to the Norwegian U-21's for the 2013 UEFA European Under-21 Football Championship in June 2013. These players were goalkeeper Ørjan Nyland, defender Martin Linnes, midfielder Magnus Wolff Eikrem and attacker Jo Inge Berget. Both Eikrem and Berget scored in Norway's 1–3 victory over England on 8 June 2013. Molde's first game back after the summer break was a 6–0 fourth round cup win over Adeccoligaen side Ranheim to put them into the Quarter-finals. Molde were 3–0 at half time after goals from Agnaldo 5mins, Gatt 17 and Simonsen 27. The second half goals came courtesy of a Jørgen Olsen Own goal in the 49th, Ekpo in the 50th and Chima rounded it off with his 5th goal of the season in the 80th minute. Molde narrowly continued their unbeaten run in their first league game back after the break with a 3–3 away draw against Vålerenga. Molde went 1–0 down after 10minutes when Morten Berre scored for the homeside, before Jo Inge Berget and Martin Linnes both scored to give Molde a halftime lead. In the second half Jan Gunnar Solli equalised for Vålerenga before Berre's second put them in the lead again. Agnaldo popped up the first minute of injury time to earn a point for the away side.

On 24 June, Magnus Wolff Eikrem was sold to Dutch Eredivisie side SC Heerenveen for 10,000,000 NOK. After round 14 of the championship, on 29/30 June, Molde moved out of the automatic relegation places for the first time during the season. Molde came from behind to win 3-1 at home to Sarpsborg 08 on 29 June 2013, thanks to goals from Martin Linnes, Daniel Chima and Zlatko Tripić after Jérémy Berthod had given the lead early in the first half. The game against Sarpsborg 08 also resulted in a serious knee injury for Josh Gatt, which ruled him out for the remainder of the season.

3 July 2013 saw Molde take on Adeccoligaen side Mjøndalen in the quarterfinals of the Norwegian Cup, winning the match 2-0 with goals from Even Hovland and Zlatko Tripić. On the same day Molde announced the signing of Norwegian U21 international Mats Møller Dæhli from Manchester United on a two-and-a-half-year contract. 2 days later, on 5 July, Lauri Dalla Valle left Molde after only 6 appearances to join Belgian Second Division side Sint-Truiden. On the same day Molde announced that Per Egil Flo would be joining them from Sogndal on 15 July. On 10 July, it was announced that Tommy Høiland was joining on 15 July, and 11 July it was announced that Vegard Forren was returning to the club following his unsuccessful spell at Southampton. Forren made his 2nd debut for Molde two days later in Molde's 1-0 away victory over Sligo Rovers in the 1st leg of the Champions League 2nd qualifying round. The winning goal for Molde came in the 42nd minute from Daniel Chima.

== Transfers ==
=== In ===
Date	Position	Nationality	Name	From	Fee
February 2013	FW	(Senegal)	Aliou Coly	(Senegal) Casa Sport	
25 February 2013	FW	(Finland)	Lauri Dalla Valle	(England) Fulham	
13 March 2013	DF	(Finland)	Joona Toivio	(Sweden) Djurgården	
29 March 2013	FW	(United States)	Ben Spencer	(United States) Chivas USA	Free
	GK	(Norway)	Ørjan Nyland	(Norway) IL Hødd	Free
3 July 2013†	MF	(Norway)	Mats Møller Dæhli	(England) Manchester United	
5 July 2013†	DF	(Norway)	Per Egil Flo	(Norway) Sogndal	
10 July 2013†	FW	(Norway)	Tommy Høiland	(Norway) Sandnes Ulf	
11 July 2013†	DF	(Norway)	Vegard Forren	(England) Southampton	
15 July 2013	FW	(Norway)	Fredrik Gulbrandsen	(Norway) Lillestrøm	

† Dæhli, Flo, Høiland and Forren's transfers were announced on the above dates, and were finalised on 15 July.

=== Out ===
Date	Position	Nationality	Name	To	Fee
18 January 2013	DF	(Norway)	Vegard Forren	(England) Southampton	Undisclosed
26 January 2013	FW	(Ivory Coast)	Davy Claude Angan	(China) Hangzhou Greentown	12,000,000 NOK
5 March 2013	DF	(Norway)	Krister Wemberg	(Norway) Bryne	
	FW	(Norway)	Simon Markeng	(Norway) Kristiansund	
	FW	(Senegal)	Pape Paté Diouf	(Denmark) Copenhagen	Loan Return
24 June 2013	MF	(Norway)	Magnus Wolff Eikrem	(Netherlands) Heerenveen	10,000,000 NOK
5 July 2013	FW	(Finland)	Lauri Dalla Valle	(Belgium) Sint-Truiden	

=== Loans in ===
Date from	Date to	Position	Nationality	Name	From
	Season-long	MF	(Brazil)	Agnaldo	(Brazil) Desportivo Brasil

=== Loans out ===
Date from	Date to	Position	Nationality	Name	To
February 2013	July 2013	MF	(Norway)	Pål Erik Ulvestad	Hønefoss
April 2013	Season-Long	MF	(Norway)	Magnus Stamnestrø	Sogndal
	Season-long	GK	(Norway)	Ola Hermann Opheim	Kristiansund
July 2013	End of Season	DF	(Norway)	Magnar Ødegaard	Lillestrøm

=== Released ===
Date	Position	Nationality	Name	Joined	Date
23 April 2013	MF	(Senegal)	Abdou Karim Camara	(France) Cherbourg	August 2013
15 July 2013	DF	(United States)	Sean Cunningham		
1 October 2013	DF	(Norway)	Børre Steenslid	Retired, joined coaching staff	

== Pre-season games ==
8 February 2013	Brann	2–2	Molde	Bergen
19:00 CET	Huseklepp 14'; Mjelde 90'	Summary	Dalla Valle 23'; Steenslid 45'	Stadium: Brann Stadion

15 February 2013	Molde	2–2	Sogndal	Molde
13:00 CET	Moström 2'; Chima 32'	Summary	Flo 10'; Santos 79'	Stadium: Aker Stadion

19 February 2013	Kristiansund	5–0	Molde	Kristiansund
18:00 CET	Tømmernes 8', 50'; J.Mendy 52'; Markeng 58'; A.Røsand 86'	Summary		Stadium: Atlanten stadion

22 February 2013	Copenhagen (Denmark)	2–1	(Norway) Molde	Copenhagen, Denmark
13:00 CET	Sigurðsson 11'; Diouf 86'	Summary	Chima 90'	Stadium: Parken Stadium

27 February 2013	Molde (Norway)	1–0	(Russia) Lokomotiv Moscow	Marbella, Spain
17:00 CET	Chima 63'	Summary		Stadium: Marbella Football Center

3 March 2013	Molde (Norway)	0–2	(Russia) Spartak Moscow	Marbella, Spain
16:30 CET		Summary	Movsisyan 5'; Ari 43'	Stadium: Estadio Municipal de Marbella

6 March 2013	Molde (Norway)	1–0	(Belarus) BATE	Marbella, Spain
16:00 CET	Hussain 88'	Summary		Stadium: Marbella Football Center

9 March 2013	Aalesund	4–0	Molde	Ålesund
17:00 CET	Ulvestad 48', 69', 78'; James 90'	Summary		Stadium: Color Line Stadion

25 March 2013	Molde (Norway)	1–0	Kazakhstan U21	, Turkey
15:00 CET	Agnaldo 15'	Summary

=== Copa del Sol ===
23 January 2013	Molde (Norway)	1–3	(Poland) Widzew Łódź	La Manga, Spain
19:00 CET	Hussain 54'		P. Stępiński 58'; Nowak 61'; Kaczmarek 89'	Stadium: La Manga Stadium

26 January 2013	Vaslui (Romania)	1–0	(Norway) Molde	La Manga, Spain
19:00 CET	Stanciu 36'			Stadium: Pinatar Arena

30 January 2013	Molde (Norway)	3–2	(China) Shanghai East Asia	La Manga, Spain
13:00 CET	Simonsen 30'; Chima 48'; Hoseth 58' (pen.)		Wu Lei 12', 81'	Stadium: Pinatar Arena

== Competitions ==
=== Tippeligaen ===
==== Results summary ====
Overall								Home						Away					
Pld	W	D	L	GF	GA	GD	Pts	W	D	L	GF	GA	GD	W	D	L	GF	GA	GD
30	12	8	10	46	37	+9	44	8	2	5	29	17	+12	4	6	5	17	20	−3

==== Results by round ====
Round	1	2	3	4	5	6	7	8	9	10	11	12	13	14	15	16	17	18	19	20	21	22	23	24	25	26	27	28	29	30
Ground	A	H	A	H	A	H	A	H	A	H	A	H	A	H	A	H	A	H	A	H	A	H	A	H	A	H	A	H	A	H
Result	L	L	L	L	D	L	D	W	D	L	D	W	D	W	W	D	L	W	W	D	L	W	W	W	D	W	W	W	L	L
Position	12	13	16	16	16	16	16	16	16	16	16	15	15	14	11	11	13	11	9	10	10	9	7	6	6	6	5	4	5	6

Updated to match(es) played on 11 November 2013. Source: see below
A = Away; H = Home; W = Win; D = Draw; L = Loss

==== Fixtures ====
16 March 2013 1	Viking	2–1	Molde	Stavanger
19:00 CET (UTC+1)	Berisha 31'; Olsen 57'	Summary	Moström 10'	Stadium: Viking Stadion; Attendance: 9,059; Referee: Tommy Skjerven

2 April 2013 2	Molde	1–2	Lillestrøm	Molde
18:30 CEST (UTC+2)	Toivio 70'	Summary	Moen 13'; Kippe 77'	Stadium: Aker Stadion; Attendance: 7,981; Referee: Trygve Kjensli

6 April 2013 3	Brann	1–0	Molde	Bergen
18:00 CEST (UTC+2)	Askar 80'	Summary		Stadium: Brann Stadion; Attendance: 10,608; Referee: Espen Berntsen

13 April 2013 4	Molde	1–2	Sogndal	Molde
15:30 CEST (UTC+2)	Hussain 90+5'	Summary	Santos 17'; Stamnestrø 86'	Stadium: Aker Stadion; Attendance: 9,419; Referee: Trond Ivar Døvle

20 April 2013 5	Odd	1–1	Molde	Skien
15:30 CEST (UTC+2)	Storbæk 34'	Summary	Hestad 38'	Stadium: Skagerak Arena; Attendance: 5,267; Referee: Ken Henry Johnsen

28 April 2013 6	Molde	1–2	Strømsgodset	Molde
19:00 CEST (UTC+2)	Chima 83'	Summary	Vilsvik 30'; Keita 54'	Stadium: Aker Stadion; Attendance: 7,854; Referee: Svein Oddvar Moen

6 May 2013 7	Start	1–1	Molde	Kristiansand
19:00 CEST (UTC+2)	Castro 43'	Summary	Moström 45'	Stadium: Sør Arena; Attendance: 5,612; Referee: Brage Sandmoen

9 May 2013 8	Molde	4–1	Aalesund	Molde
18:00 CEST (UTC+2)	Toivio 25'; Eikrem 35'; Berget 63', 67'	Summary	Barrantes 52'	Stadium: Aker Stadion; Attendance: 11,074; Referee: Tom Harald Hagen

12 May 2013 9	Sandnes Ulf	0–0	Molde	Sandnes
18:00 CEST (UTC+2)		Summary		Stadium: Sandnes Idrettspark; Attendance: 3,150; Referee: Kjetil Sælen

16 May 2013 10	Molde	1–5	Haugesund	Molde
18:00 CEST (UTC+2)	Vatshaug 5'	Summary	Gytkjær 1', 42', 84' (pen.); Søderlund 47'; Haukås 59'	Stadium: Aker Stadion; Attendance: 8,878; Referee: Dag Vidar Hafsås

20 May 2013 11	Rosenborg	0–0	Molde	Trondheim
18:00 CEST (UTC+2)		Summary	Linnes (red card) 20'	Stadium: Lerkendal Stadion; Attendance: 20,188; Referee: Tom Harald Hagen

25 May 2013 12	Molde	4–0	Hønefoss	Molde
15:30 CEST (UTC+2)	Chima 12', 60'; Eikrem 51'; Tripić 55'	Summary		Stadium: Aker Stadion; Attendance: 8,168; Referee: Trond Ivar Døvle

22 June 2013 13	Vålerenga	3–3	Molde	Oslo
15:30 CEST (UTC+2)	Berre 10', 59'; Solli 56'	Summary	Berget 28'; Linnes 40'; Agnaldo 90+1'	Stadium: Ullevaal Stadion; Attendance: 10,694; Referee: Tom Harald Hagen

29 June 2013 14	Molde	3–1	Sarpsborg 08	Molde
15:30 CEST (UTC+2)	Linnes 45+1'; Chima 67'; Tripic 90'	Summary	Berthod 27'	Stadium: Aker Stadion; Attendance: 8,732; Referee: Trygve Kjensli

7 July 2013 15	Tromsø	2–3	Molde	Tromsø
15:30 CEST (UTC+2)	Andersen 23'; Johansen 27'	Summary	Chima 7', 61'; Moström 69'	Stadium: Alfheim Stadion; Attendance: 4,120; Referee: Kristoffer Helgerud

13 July 2013 16	Molde	1–1	Viking	Molde
15:30 CEST (UTC+2)	Toivio 82'	Summary	Olsen 30'	Stadium: Aker Stadion; Attendance: 9,840; Referee: Tore Hansen

27 July 2013 17	Lillestrøm	2–0	Molde	Lillestrøm
18:00 CEST (UTC+2)	Riise 41'; Helstad 71'	Summary		Stadium: Åråsen Stadion; Attendance: 5,050; Referee: Dag Vidar Hafsås

4 August 2013 18	Molde	2–0	Brann	Molde
15:30 CEST (UTC+2)	Berget 32'; Gulbrandsen 74'	Summary	Mojsov (yellow card) 4' (yellow-red card) 14'	Stadium: Aker Stadion; Attendance: 8,628; Referee: Svein Erik Edvartsen

10 August 2013 19	Sogndal	1–2	Molde	Sogndalsfjøra
15:30 CEST (UTC+2)	Mane 24'	Summary	Toivio 73'; Høiland 75'	Stadium: Fosshaugane Campus; Attendance: 3,507; Referee: Espen Berntsen

17 August 2013 20	Molde	1–1	Odd	Molde
15:30 CEST (UTC+2)	Berget 54'	Summary	Johnsen 42'	Stadium: Aker Stadion; Attendance: 8,349; Referee: Kristoffer Helgerud

24 August 2013 21	Strømsgodset	5–2	Molde	Drammen
17:00 CEST (UTC+2)	Kamara 10', 83' (pen.); Storbæk 42'; Hamoud 58'; Storflor 61'	Summary	Gulbrandsen 32'; Linnes 51'	Stadium: Marienlyst Stadion; Attendance: 7,110; Referee: Svein Erik Edvartsen

1 September 2013 22	Molde	4–0	Vålerenga	Molde
19:00 CEST (UTC+2)	Gulbrandsen 12', 25'; Berget 14'; Linnes 85'	Summary		Stadium: Aker Stadion; Attendance: 8,381; Referee: Ken Henry Johnsen

13 September 2013 23	Aalesund	1–3	Molde	Ålesund
19:00 CEST (UTC+2)	Phillips (red card) 39'; Hamdallah 62'	Summary	Hovland 26'; Hoseth 45', 67' (pen.); Høiland (yellow card) 39' (yellow-red card) 72'	Stadium: Color Line Stadion; Attendance: 10,082; Referee: Svein Oddvar Moen

22 September 2013 24	Molde	4–1	Sandnes Ulf	Molde
18:00 CEST (UTC+2)	Hussain 7'; Chima 14'; Berget 25'; Hoseth 45+1' (pen.)	Summary	McDermott (red card) 44'; Dæhli 74' (o.g.)	Stadium: Aker Stadion; Attendance: 8,243; Referee: Omar Rafiq

29 September 2013 25	Haugesund	1–1	Molde	Haugesund
15:30 CEST (UTC+2)	Nilsen 11'	Summary	Chima 59'; Coly (red card) 88'	Stadium: Haugesund Stadion; Attendance: 5,329; Referee: Tore Hansen

6 October 2013 26	Molde	1–0	Tromsø	Molde
18:00 CEST (UTC+2)	Gulbrandsen 4'	Summary		Stadium: Aker Stadion; Attendance: 8,278; Referee: Dag Vidar Hafsås

20 October 2013 27	Hønefoss	0–1	Molde	Hønefoss
15:30 CEST (UTC+2)		Summary	Chima 54'	Stadium: Aka Arena; Attendance: 2,876; Referee: Ken Henry Johnsen

26 October 2013 28	Molde	1–0	Rosenborg	Molde
18:00 CEST (UTC+2)	Hoseth 80' (pen.)	Summary		Stadium: Aker Stadion; Attendance: 10,691; Referee: Tom Harald Hagen

3 November 2013 29	Sarpsborg 08	1–0	Molde	Sarpsborg
18:00 CET (UTC+1)	Wiig 58'	Summary		Stadium: Sarpsborg Stadion; Attendance: 3,740; Referee: Trond Ivar Døvle

10 November 2013 30	Molde	0–1	Start	Molde
18:00 CET (UTC+1)		Summary	Asante 49'	Stadium: Aker Stadion; Attendance: 7,906; Referee: Martin Lundby

==== Table ====
Pos	Team	Pld	W	D	L	GF	GA	GD	Pts	Qualification or relegation
4	Aalesund	30	14	7	9	55	44	+11	49	
5	Viking	30	12	10	8	41	36	+5	46	
6	Molde	30	12	8	10	47	38	+9	44	Qualification for the Europa League second qualifying round (Note: Molde qualified for the second qualifying round of the UEFA Europa League as winners of the 2013 Norwegian Cup.)
7	Odd	30	11	7	12	43	39	+4	40	
8	Brann	30	11	6	13	46	46	0	39	

Source: fotball.no
Rules for classification: 1) points; 2) goal difference; 3) number of goals scored.

=== Norwegian Cup ===
17 April 2013 First Round	Elnesvågen	0–5	Molde	Elnesvågen
18:00 CEST (UTC+2)		Summary	Coly 25', 30', 35', 60'; Agnaldo 51'	Stadium: Elnesvågen Stadion; Attendance: 679; Referee: Mathias Smehus Kringstad

2 May 2013 Second Round	Byåsen	1–5	Molde	Trondheim
19:00 CEST (UTC+2)	Ø.Alseth 61'	Summary	Hussain 6'; H.Karlsen 13' (o.g.); Linnes 38'; Chima 57'; Agnaldo 85'	Stadium: Byåsen Arena; Attendance: 926; Referee: Kjetil Thorsø Hansen

29 May 2013 Third Round	Hødd	2–2 (a.e.t.) (4–5 p)	Molde	Ulsteinvik
18:00 CEST (UTC+2)	Sandal 38'; Latifu 120'	Summary	Eikrem 90+4'; Hovland 112'	Stadium: Høddvoll Stadion; Attendance: 3,415; Referee: Tommy Skjerven
	Penalties
	Latifu (penalty scored); Nilsen (penalty scored); Heltne (penalty scored); Aursnes (penalty scored); Rekdal (penalty missed); Grodås (penalty missed); Magnussen (penalty missed)		Hovland (penalty scored); Ekpo (penalty scored); Agnaldo (penalty scored); Tripić (penalty scored); Eikrem (penalty missed); Rindarøy (penalty missed); Chima (penalty scored)

19 June 2013 Fourth Round	Molde	6–0	Ranheim	Molde
18:00 CEST (UTC+2)	Agnaldo 5'; Gatt 17'; Simonsen 27'; Olsen 49' (o.g.); Ekpo 50'; Chima 80'	Summary		Stadium: Aker Stadion; Attendance: 4,380; Referee: Ken Henry Johnsen

3 July 2013 Quarter-finals	Molde	2–0	Mjøndalen	Molde
19:35 CEST (UTC+2)	Hovland 49'; Tripić 82'	Summary		Stadium: Aker Stadion; Attendance: 5,009; Referee: Brage Sandmoen

26 September 2013 Semi-finals	Lillestrøm	2–2 (a.e.t.) (4–5 p)	Molde	Lillestrøm
20:00 CEST (UTC+2)	Pálmason 30'; Østli 56'	Summary	Hoseth 34', 90+1'	Stadium: Åråsen Stadion; Attendance: 6,480; Referee: Tom Harald Hagen
	Penalties
	Moen (penalty scored); Riise (penalty scored); Helstad (penalty scored); Kippe (penalty scored); Piermayr (penalty missed)		Hoseth (penalty scored); Forren (penalty scored); Hovland (penalty scored); Høiland (penalty scored); Hussain (penalty scored)

==== Final ====
24 November 2013	Molde	4–2	Rosenborg	Oslo
13:15 CET (UTC+1)	Rindarøy 16'; Berget 71'; Hoseth 82'; Høiland 90'	Summary	Diskerud 17'; Reginiussen 49'	Stadium: Ullevaal Stadion; Referee: Svein Oddvar Moen

=== UEFA Champions League ===
==== Qualifying phase ====
17 July 2013 2nd qualifying round 1st Leg	Sligo Rovers (Republic of Ireland)	0–1	(Norway) Molde	Sligo, Ireland
19:00 CEST (UTC+2)		Report	Chima 42'	Stadium: Showgrounds; Attendance: 3,840; Referee: Alexandre Boucaut (Belgium)

23 July 2013 2nd qualifying round 2nd Leg	Molde (Norway)	2–0 (3–0 agg.)	(Republic of Ireland) Sligo Rovers	Molde, Norway
19:00 CEST (UTC+2)	Linnes 5'; Coly 77'	Report		Stadium: Aker Stadion; Attendance: 5,765; Referee: Danilo Grujić (Serbia)

30 July 2013 3rd qualifying round 1st Leg	Molde (Norway)	1–1	(Poland) Legia Warsaw	Molde, Norway
19:00 CEST (UTC+2)	Chima 29'; Gulbrandsen (yellow card) 21' (yellow-red card) 74'	Report	Dvalishvili 68'	Stadium: Aker Stadion; Attendance: 6,063; Referee: Anastassios Kakos (Greece)

7 August 2013 3rd qualifying round 2nd Leg	Legia Warsaw (Poland)	0–0 (1(a)–1 agg.)	(Norway) Molde	Warsaw, Poland
20:45 CEST (UTC+2)		Report	Ekpo (yellow card) 69' (yellow-red card) 79'	Stadium: Pepsi Arena; Attendance: 23,379; Referee: Alexandru Tudor (Romania)

=== UEFA Europa League ===
==== Qualifying phase ====
22 August 2013 Play-off round 1st Leg	Molde (Norway)	0–2	(Russia) Rubin Kazan	Molde, Norway
19:00 CEST (UTC+2)		Report	Rondón 21', 90'	Stadium: Aker Stadion; Attendance: 4,384; Referee: Alon Yefet (Israel)

29 August 2013 Play-off round 2nd Leg	Rubin Kazan (Russia)	3–0 (5–0 agg.)	(Norway) Molde	Kazan, Russia
17:00 CEST (UTC+2)	Prudnikov 33'; Eremenko 50'; Azmoun 84'	Report		Stadium: Central Stadium; Attendance: 4,500; Referee: Sascha Kever (Switzerland)

== Squad statistics ==
As of Match played 24 November 2013

=== Appearances and goals ===
No.	Pos	Nat	Player	Total		Tippeligaen		Norwegian Cup		Champions League		Europa League	
No.	Pos	Nat	Player	Apps	Goals	Apps	Goals	Apps	Goals	Apps	Goals	Apps	Goals
1	GK	(Norway) NOR	Espen Bugge Pettersen	2	0	2+0	0	0+0	0	0+0	0	0+0	0
2	DF	(Norway) NOR	Kristoffer Paulsen Vatshaug	10	1	7+2	1	0+0	0	0+0	0	1+0	0
4	DF	(Norway) NOR	Even Hovland	34	3	22+2	1	5+0	2	2+1	0	1+1	0
5	DF	(Finland) FIN	Joona Toivio	24	4	16+0	4	2+0	0	4+0	0	2+0	0
6	MF	(Norway) NOR	Daniel Berg Hestad	29	1	14+5	1	3+2	0	3+0	0	2+0	0
7	MF	(Norway) NOR	Mats Møller Dæhli	15	0	7+5	0	1+1	0	0+0	0	1+0	0
8	FW	(Norway) NOR	Fredrik Gulbrandsen	14	5	7+3	5	2+0	0	1+0	0	1+0	0
9	MF	(Sweden) SWE	Mattias Moström	35	3	23+3	3	4+1	0	4+0	0	0+0	0
10	MF	(Norway) NOR	Magne Hoseth	21	7	11+3	4	4+0	3	0+2	0	1+0	0
11	FW	(Norway) NOR	Jo Inge Berget	36	7	23+2	7	5+0	0	4+0	0	1+1	0
12	GK	(Sweden) SWE	Ole Söderberg	10	0	8+1	0	1+0	0	0+0	0	0+0	0
13	MF	(Norway) NOR	Pål Erik Ulvestad	0	0	0+0	0	0+0	0	0+0	0	0+0	0
14	DF	(Norway) NOR	Martin Linnes	35	6	23+1	4	5+1	1	4+0	1	1+0	0
15	DF	(Norway) NOR	Per Egil Flo	9	0	8+0	0	1+0	0	0+0	0	0+0	0
16	MF	(Norway) NOR	Etzaz Hussain	31	3	15+7	2	6+0	1	1+1	0	1+0	0
17	FW	(Senegal) SEN	Aliou Coly	14	5	2+6	0	1+1	4	1+2	1	1+0	0
18	DF	(Norway) NOR	Magne Simonsen	14	1	7+2	0	4+0	1	1+0	0	0+0	0
19	MF	(Norway) NOR	Eirik Hestad	3	0	0+1	0	0+2	0	0+0	0	0+0	0
20	FW	(Norway) NOR	Tommy Høiland	12	2	7+2	1	1+1	1	0+1	0	0+0	0
21	FW	(Brazil) BRA	Agnaldo	15	4	3+4	1	3+2	3	0+1	0	1+1	0
22	MF	(United States) USA	Josh Gatt	13	1	10+2	0	1+0	1	0+0	0	0+0	0
23	DF	(Norway) NOR	Knut Olav Rindarøy	25	1	18+0	0	3+0	1	2+0	0	2+0	0
25	DF	(Norway) NOR	Vegard Forren	22	0	14+0	0	2+0	0	4+0	0	2+0	0
26	GK	(Norway) NOR	Ørjan Nyland	32	0	20+0	0	6+0	0	4+0	0	2+0	0
27	FW	(Nigeria) NGR	Daniel Chima	39	13	20+7	9	6+0	2	4+0	2	1+1	0
28	DF	(Norway) NOR	Ivar Furu	1	0	0+0	0	0+1	0	0+0	0	0+0	0
29	MF	(Nigeria) NGR	Emmanuel Ekpo	35	1	18+7	0	5+0	1	4+0	0	1+0	0
30	MF	(Norway) NOR	Zlatko Tripić	29	3	5+13	2	4+1	1	1+3	0	0+2	0
31	FW	(United States) USA	Ben Spencer	2	0	0+2	0	0+0	0	0+0	0	0+0	0
33	MF	(Norway) NOR	Andreas Hollingen	2	0	0+1	0	0+1	0	0+0	0	0+0	0
35	DF	(Norway) NOR	Victor Johansen	1	0	0+0	0	1+0	0	0+0	0	0+0	0
49	FW	(Norway) NOR	Sander Svendsen	3	0	0+2	0	0+1	0	0+0	0	0+0	0
Players away from Molde on loan:
24	DF	(Norway) NOR	Magnar Ødegaard	9	0	4+2	0	3+0	0	0+0	0	0+0	0
	MF	(Norway) NOR	Magnus Stamnestrø	0	0	0+0	0	0+0	0	0+0	0	0+0	0
Players who appeared for Molde no longer at the club:
3	DF	(Norway) NOR	Børre Steenslid	3	0	2+0	0	1+0	0	0+0	0	0+0	0
7	MF	(Norway) NOR	Magnus Wolff Eikrem	14	3	13+0	2	0+1	1	0+0	0	0+0	0
20	FW	(Finland) FIN	Lauri Dalla Valle	6	0	1+3	0	0+2	0	0+0	0	0+0	0

=== Disciplinary record ===
Number	Nation	Position	Name	Tippeligaen		Norwegian Cup		Champions League		Europa League		Total	
Number	Nation	Position	Name	Yellow card	Red card	Yellow card	Red card	Yellow card	Red card	Yellow card	Red card	Yellow card	Red card
4	(Norway)	DF	Even Hovland	3	0	1	0	1	0	0	0	5	0
5	(Finland)	DF	Joona Toivio	3	0	0	0	0	0	0	0	3	0
6	(Norway)	MF	Daniel Berg Hestad	1	0	0	0	1	0	1	0	3	0
7	(Norway)	MF	Magnus Wolff Eikrem	2	0	0	0	0	0	0	0	2	0
8	(Norway)	FW	Fredrik Gulbrandsen	2	0	0	0	2	1	0	0	4	1
9	(Sweden)	FW	Mattias Moström	1	0	0	0	0	0	0	0	1	0
10	(Norway)	MF	Magne Hoseth	7	0	1	0	0	0	0	0	8	0
11	(Norway)	FW	Jo Inge Berget	1	0	0	0	0	0	0	0	1	0
14	(Norway)	DF	Martin Linnes	1	1	0	0	0	0	0	0	1	1
16	(Norway)	MF	Etzaz Hussain	2	0	1	0	0	0	0	0	3	0
17	(Senegal)	FW	Aliou Coly	1	1	0	0	0	0	0	0	1	1
18	(Norway)	DF	Magne Simonsen	1	0	0	0	0	0	0	0	1	0
20	(Finland)	FW	Lauri Dalla Valle	3	1	0	0	0	0	0	0	3	1
20	(Norway)	FW	Tommy Høiland	0	0	1	0	0	0	0	0	1	0
21	(Brazil)	FW	Agnaldo	0	0	1	0	0	0	1	0	2	0
22	(United States)	MF	Josh Gatt	2	0	0	0	0	0	0	0	2	0
23	(Norway)	DF	Knut Olav Rindarøy	0	0	0	0	1	0	0	0	1	0
25	(Norway)	DF	Vegard Forren	2	0	0	0	1	0	1	0	4	0
27	(Nigeria)	FW	Daniel Chima	4	0	1	0	0	0	0	0	5	0
29	(Nigeria)	MF	Emmanuel Ekpo	2	0	1	0	3	1	0	0	6	1
30	(Norway)	MF	Zlatko Tripić	0	0	1	0	1	0	0	0	2	0
			TOTALS	38	3	8	0	10	4	1	0	59	5

== See also ==
- Molde FK seasons
