= Victor Johansen =

Norwegian footballer (born 1994)

Personal information
- Full name: Victor Johansen
- Date of birth: 16 June 1994 (age 32)
- Place of birth: Brussels, Belgium
- Position: Defender

Team information
- Current team: Lyn

Youth career
- –2010: Lyn

Senior career*
Years	Team	Apps	(Gls)
2010–2011	Vålerenga	1	(0)
2012–2014	Molde	1	(0)
2014–	Lyn	0	(0)
- * Club domestic league appearances and goals as of 6 August 2014

Victor Johansen (born 16 June 1994) is a Norwegian footballer who plays for Lyn. He has previously played for Molde and Vålerenga and is the son of the former Vålerenga-player and journalist Viggo Johansen.

== Career ==
Johansen is the son of the former Vålerenga-player and journalist Viggo Johansen and was born in Brussels. Johansen grew up in Oslo and played for Lyn throughout his youth, but joined Vålerenga ahead of the 2010-season, following the bankruptcy of Lyn.

In April 2010, Johansen signed a professional contract with Vålerenga and on 16 October 2011 he made his debut in Tippeligaen against Strømsgodset. In December 2011 he signed for the Tippeligaen 2011-winners Molde. Johansen made his debut for Molde when he played 90 minutes against Steaua București in the Europa League on 25 October 2012.

On 5 August 2014, Molde FK and Johansen agreed to terminate their contract, with Johansen moving back to Lyn.

== Career statistics ==
As of 6 August 2014

Club	Season	Division	League		Cup		Europe		Total	
Club	Season	Division	Apps	Goals	Apps	Goals	Apps	Goals	Apps	Goals
Vålerenga	2010	Tippeligaen	1	0	0	0	—		1	0
Vålerenga	2011	Tippeligaen	0	0	0	0	—		0	0
Vålerenga	Total		1	0	0	0	—	—	1	0
Molde	2012	Tippeligaen	0	0	2	0	1	0	3	0
Molde	2013	Tippeligaen	0	0	1	0	0	0	1	0
Molde	2014	Tippeligaen	0	0	0	0	0	0	0	0
Molde	Total		0	0	3	0	1	0	4	0
Lyn	2014	2. divisjon	0	0	0	0	0	0	0	0
Career total			1	0	3	0	1	0	5	0
