= Børre Steenslid =

Norwegian footballer and coach (born 1985)

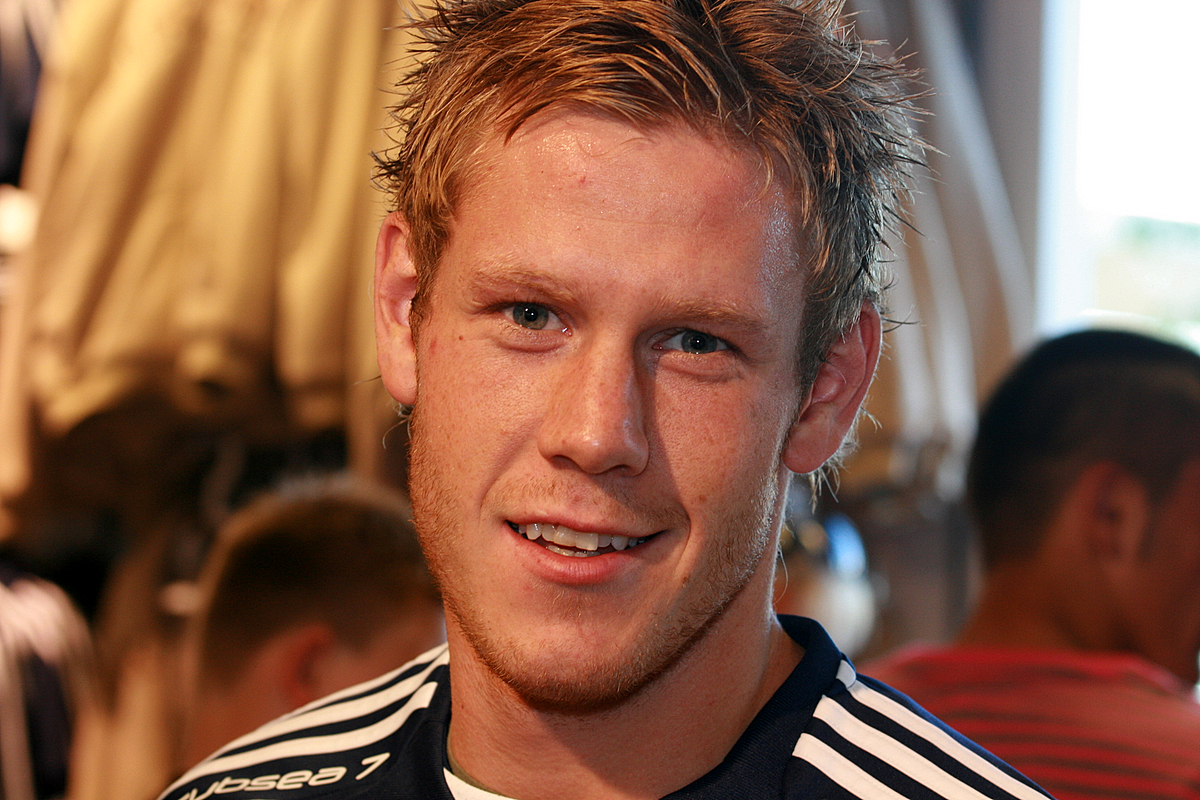

Personal information
- Full name: Børre Steenslid
- Date of birth: 25 June 1985 (age 41)
- Place of birth: Norway
- Position: Defender

Senior career*
Years	Team	Apps	(Gls)
- Skavøypoll
2004–2006	Sogndal	47	(3)
2007–2010	Viking	99	(9)
2011–2013	Molde	7	(0)
- * Club domestic league appearances and goals

Børre Steenslid (born 25 June 1985) is a Norwegian football coach and former player. He played as a defender for Sogndal, Viking and Molde. He is currently fitness coach at Molde.

Steenslid was called up to the Norwegian national team on 27 January 2009, as a part of caretaker coach Egil Olsen's first squad.

On 1 October 2013, it was announced that Steenslid had retired after failing to recover from a long-standing knee injury, and had now joined the coaching staff at Molde.

== Career statistics ==
Club	Season	Division	League		Cup		Europe		Total	
Club	Season	Division	Apps	Goals	Apps	Goals	Apps	Goals	Apps	Goals
Sogndal	2004	Tippeligaen	18	2	3	0	–		21	2
Sogndal	2005	Adeccoligaen	14	1	0	0	–		14	1
Sogndal	2006	Adeccoligaen	15	0	0	0	–		15	0
Sogndal	Total		47	3	3	0	–	–	50	3
Viking	2007	Tippeligaen	23	2	2	0	–		25	2
Viking	2008	Tippeligaen	23	4	3	0	2	0	28	4
Viking	2009	Tippeligaen	30	2	2	0	–		32	2
Viking	2010	Tippeligaen	23	1	3	0	–		26	1
Viking	Total		99	9	10	0	2	0	111	98
Molde	2011	Tippeligaen	0	0	0	0	–		0	0
Molde	2012	Tippeligaen	5	0	2	0	2	0	9	0
Molde	2013	Tippeligaen	2	0	1	0	0	0	3	0
Molde	Total		7	0	3	0	2	0	12	0
Career Total			153	12	16	0	4	0	173	12
