= Josh Gatt =

American soccer player (born 1991)

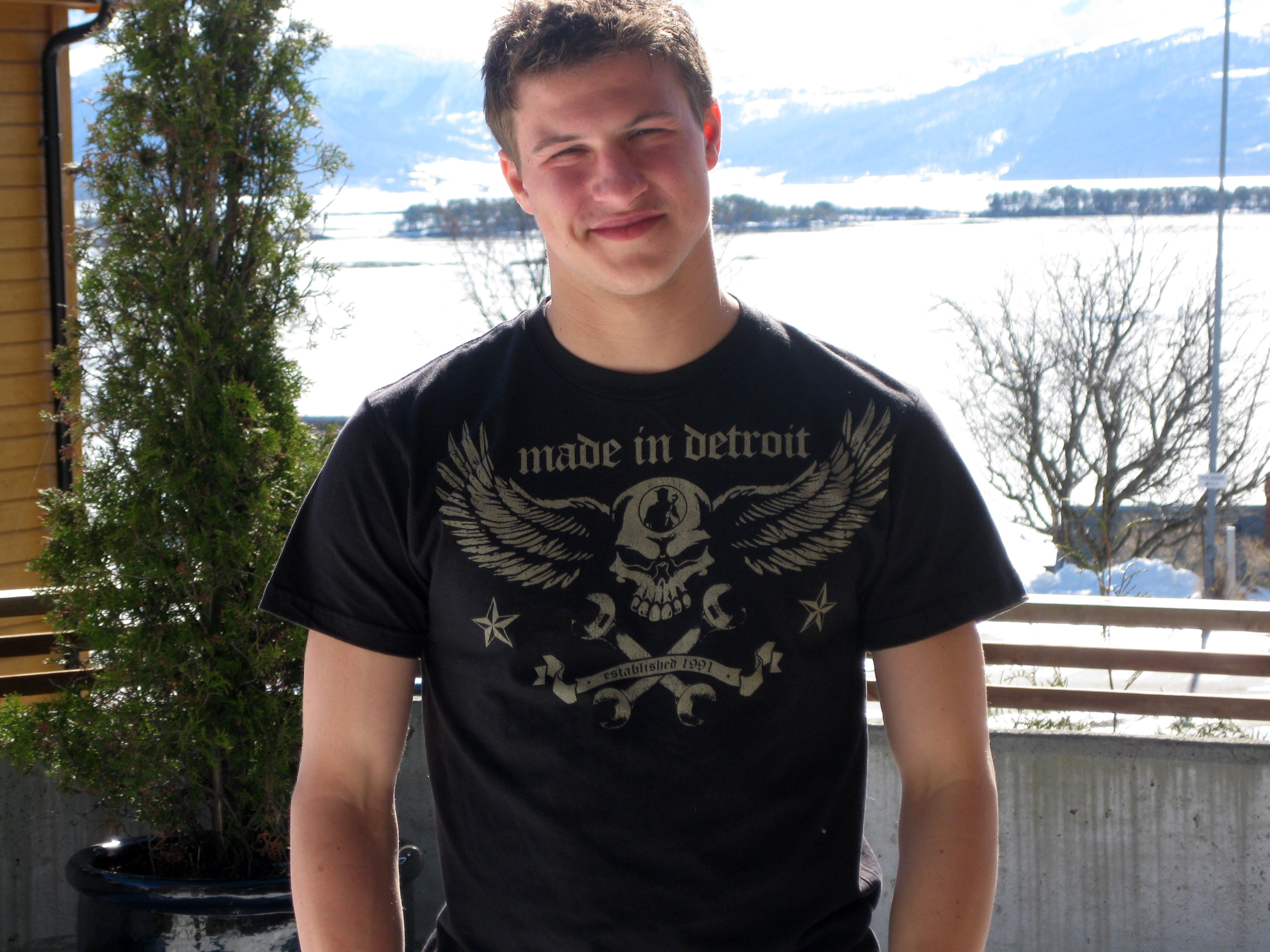

Personal information
- Full name: Joshua Alexander Gatt
- Date of birth: August 29, 1991 (age 35)
- Place of birth: Plymouth, Michigan, United States
- Height: 1.77 m (5 ft 10 in)
- Position: Winger

Youth career
- 2007–2010: Michigan Wolves

Senior career*
Years	Team	Apps	(Gls)
2010–2011	Rheindorf Altach	15	(4)
2011–2016	Molde	60	(9)
2017	Minnesota United	0	(0)
2017	Colorado Rapids	20	(2)
2018	Detroit City	1	(0)
2018–2019	Rheindorf Altach	15	(1)
2019	Rheindorf Altach II	2	(1)
2020	Dundalk	2	(0)
2021	Pittsburgh Riverhounds	6	(0)
2023	Gold Star FC	4	(0)

International career^{‡}
2010–2011	United States U20	4	(3)
2012–2013	United States	2	(0)
- * Club domestic league appearances and goals as of April 6, 2023 ‡ National team caps and goals as of January 29, 2013

Joshua Alexander Gatt (born August 29, 1991) is an American former professional soccer player who last played for Gold Star FC.

== Club career ==
=== Early career ===
Born in Plymouth, Michigan, Gatt played varsity for four years at Detroit Catholic Central High School. He also played in the U.S. Soccer Development Academy for the Michigan Wolves.

=== Rheindorf Altach ===
Gatt first attracted attention as a Michigan-area youth player when his club competed in a tournament against European academy teams in Switzerland. Through the SuperElite system, the winger was offered trials at 1. FSV Mainz 05 and at SCR Altach and eventually received an offer from the latter club.

Gatt proceeded to sign with SC Rheindorf Altach, leaving behind an opportunity to play at Indiana University. Upon his arrival in Austria in the summer of 2010, he immediately joined the first team, and scored 5 goals in 14 matches.

=== Molde ===
On January 12, 2011, it was announced that Gatt had joined Norwegian side Molde, and was among Ole Gunnar Solskjær's first signings as manager together with Davy Claude Angan and Magnus Wolff Eikrem. He made his debut against Sarpsborg 08 on March 18. He scored his first goal on July 30 against Vålerenga. Josh scored his second goal in as many games on August 4 against Start.

In the first half of the 2012 season, Gatt scored goals against Strømsgodset, Stabæk and Vålerenga. According to himself he also scored a goal against Sandnes Ulf, but the official statistics count that one to Mattias Moström.

On June 29, 2013, during the first half of Molde's home Tippeligaen match against Sarpsborg 08, Gatt seriously injured his knee, ruling him out for the remainder of the season and requiring surgery. Gatt also missed the entire 2014 season. After almost 21 months out injured, Gatt was finally cleared to play again on April 20, 2015. Gatt made his long-awaited return for Molde on May 22, 2015, but his lasted only 4 minutes before feeling "....pain and insecurity..." in his knee, resulting in a third operation on the troublesome knee. Over a year later, September 11, 2016, Gatt again made his return for Molde, coming on as a 67th-minute substitute for Harmeet Singh.

=== United States ===
Gatt left Molde at the end of 2016, going on trial with 1. FC Nürnberg in January 2017, before signing with MLS team Minnesota United on February 15, 2017.

On March 31, 2017 Minnesota United FC traded Gatt, Mohammed Saeid, and an international roster spot to Colorado Rapids for Marc Burch and Sam Cronin. His option was declined at the end of the 2017 season.

During the 2017 offseason, Gatt's wife Melissa was diagnosed with cancer. While acting as his wife's caregiver during chemotherapy, he played one game for NPSL club Detroit City FC. After her cancer went into remission, he re-joined Rheindorf Altach in June 2018. On July 16, 2018, Gatt officially signed with Rheindorf Altach.

=== Dundalk ===
On June 23, 2020, Gatt signed for League of Ireland Premier Division club Dundalk. Gatt made his debut for the club in the FAI Cup against Waterford F.C. on August 11.

Gatt left Dundalk in November 2020.

=== Pittsburgh Riverhounds ===
On February 11, 2021, Gatt joined USL Championship side Pittsburgh Riverhounds SC.

== International career ==
Gatt was called up to the United States national team on September 2, 2012, but he had to withdraw due a hamstring injury. He made his international debut on November 14, 2012, in a friendly match versus Russia. Gatt was originally named to the 23-man roster for the 2013 CONCACAF Gold Cup, but was later ruled out for the tournament after picking up a knee injury in a match on June 29 against Sarpsborg 08 FF.

== Style of play ==
When Gatt was signed by Molde, Solskjær stated that he had signed an attacking player with a fast pace who can play on the right wing, left wing, and as a striker. Gatt has run a self-timed 100 meters in 11.00 seconds.

== Personal life ==
Gatt's wife, Melissa, was diagnosed with cancer in early 2018. Without a club, Gatt set up a ‘Go Fund Me’ page for her treatment which was contributed to by a number of his former teammates. As of June 2018, Melissa's cancer was in remission.

== Career statistics ==
=== Club ===
As of match played August 29, 2021

Appearances and goals by club, season and competition
Club	Season	League			National cup		Continental		Total	
Club	Season	Division	Apps	Goals	Apps	Goals	Apps	Goals	Apps	Goals
Rheindorf Altach	2010–11	Erste Liga	15	4	3	2	–		18	6
Molde	2011	Tippeligaen	22	3	5	2	-		27	5
Molde	2012	Tippeligaen	19	5	3	0	5	0	27	5
Molde	2013	Tippeligaen	12	0	1	1	0	0	13	1
Molde	2014	Tippeligaen	0	0	0	0	0	0	0	0
Molde	2015	Tippeligaen	1	0	0	0	0	0	1	0
Molde	2016	Tippeligaen	6	1	0	0	0	0	6	1
Molde	Total		60	9	9	3	5	0	74	12
Minnesota United	2017	MLS	0	0	0	0	–		0	0
Colorado Rapids	2017	MLS	20	2	2	0	–		22	2
Rheindorf Altach	2018–19	Austrian Bundesliga	15	1	1	0	–		16	1
Dundalk	2020	League of Ireland Premier Division	2	0	1	0	0	0	3	0
Pittsburgh Riverhounds SC	2021	USL Championship	6	0	-	-	-		6	0
Career total			118	15	16	5	5	0	134	20

=== International ===
As of match played July 10, 2019

United States national team
Year	Apps	Goals
2012	1	0
2013	1	0
Total	2	0

== Honors ==
=== Club ===
Molde

- Tippeligaen: 2011, 2012, 2014
- Norwegian Cup: 2013, 2014
