= Magne Simonsen =

Norwegian footballer (born 1988)

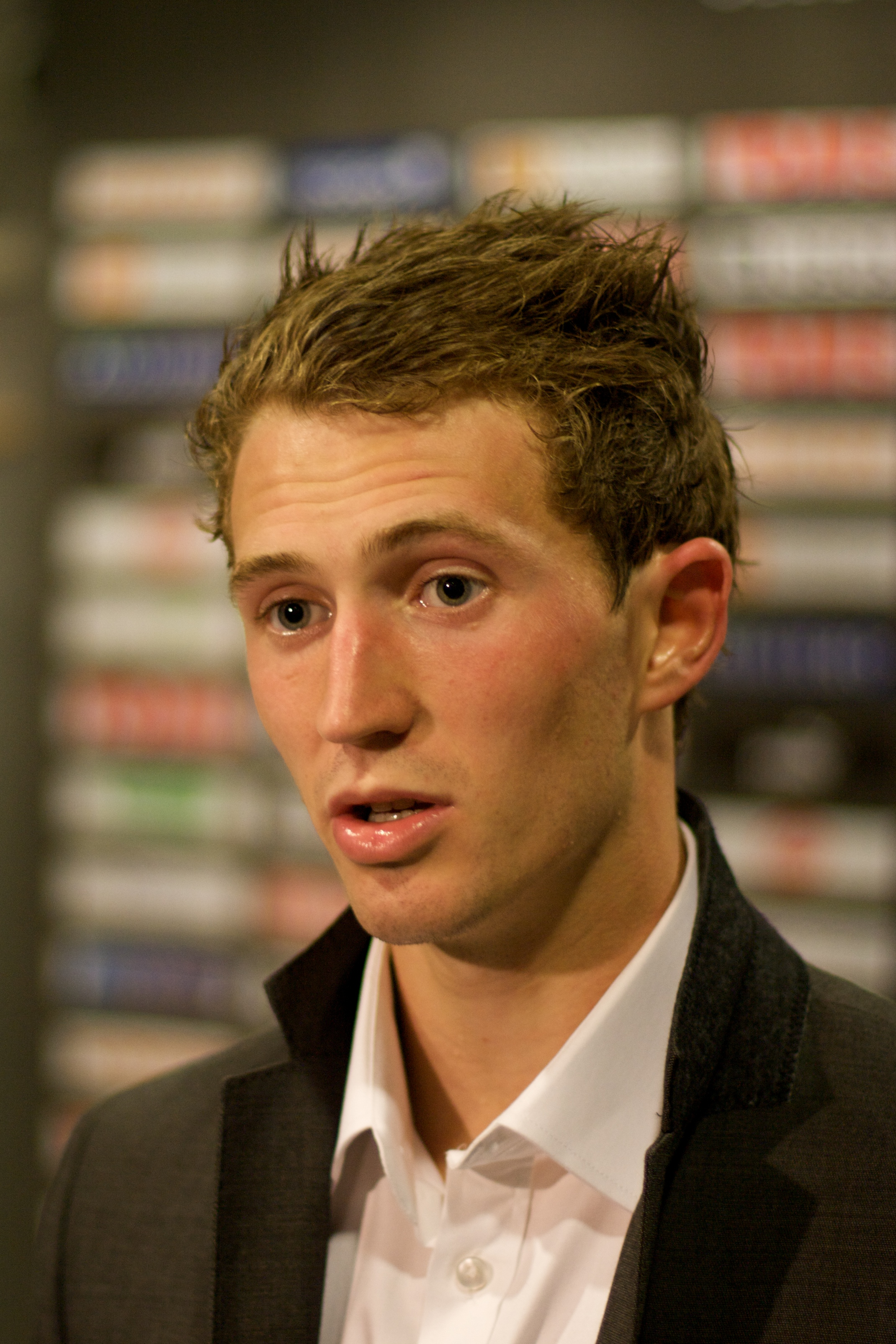

Personal information
- Date of birth: 13 July 1988 (age 38)
- Place of birth: Slemmestad, Norway
- Height: 1.78 m (5 ft 10 in)
- Position: Right back

Team information
- Current team: Byåsen

Youth career
- Slemmestad
- Lyn

Senior career*
Years	Team	Apps	(Gls)
2006–2009	Lyn	65	(2)
2007	→ Asker (loan)		
2010–2015	Molde	80	(4)
2016–2017	Fredrikstad	18	(0)
2018–	Byåsen		
- * Club domestic league appearances and goals as of 28 February 2018

Magne Simonsen (born 13 July 1988) is a Norwegian football defender who currently plays for 2. divisjon club Byåsen.

== Career ==
He hails from Slemmestad, but joined Lyn at a young age. He made his debut in the 2006 Royal League, then played a Norwegian football cup game before making his Norwegian top flight debut on 6 August 2006 against Molde FK. He even scored a goal. Ahead of the 2007 season he was loaned to Asker. He returned before the end of the season, and played 7 league games. He made his breakthrough in the 2008 season. He joined Molde ahead of the 2010 season.

Ahead of the 2018 season he was named as Byåsen's new playing assistant coach.

== Career statistics ==
As of 2 November 2016

Club	Season	Division	League		Cup		Europe		Total	
Club	Season	Division	Apps	Goals	Apps	Goals	Apps	Goals	Apps	Goals
Lyn	2006	Tippeligaen	6	1	1	0	0	0	7	1
Lyn	2007	Tippeligaen	7	1	0	0	—		7	1
Lyn	2008	Tippeligaen	23	0	3	1	—		26	1
Lyn	2009	Tippeligaen	29	0	3	0	—		32	0
Lyn	Total		65	2	7	1	0	0	72	3
Molde	2010	Tippeligaen	24	0	3	1	4	0	31	1
Molde	2011	Tippeligaen	27	2	3	0	—		30	2
Molde	2012	Tippeligaen	14	1	3	0	7	0	24	1
Molde	2013	Tippeligaen	9	0	4	1	1	0	14	1
Molde	2014	Tippeligaen	3	0	2	0	0	0	5	0
Molde	2015	Tippeligaen	3	1	0	0	1	0	4	1
Molde	Total		80	4	15	2	13	0	108	6
Fredrikstad	2016	1. divisjon	18	0	2	0	—		20	0
Fredrikstad	2017	1. divisjon	0	0	0	0	—		0	0
Fredrikstad	Total		18	0	2	0	0	0	20	0
Byåsen	2018	3. divisjon	21	0	0	0	—		21	0
Byåsen	2019	2. divisjon	0	0	0	0	—		0	0
Career Total			184	6	24	3	13	0	221	9
