= Thomas Holm (footballer) =

Norwegian footballer (born 1981)

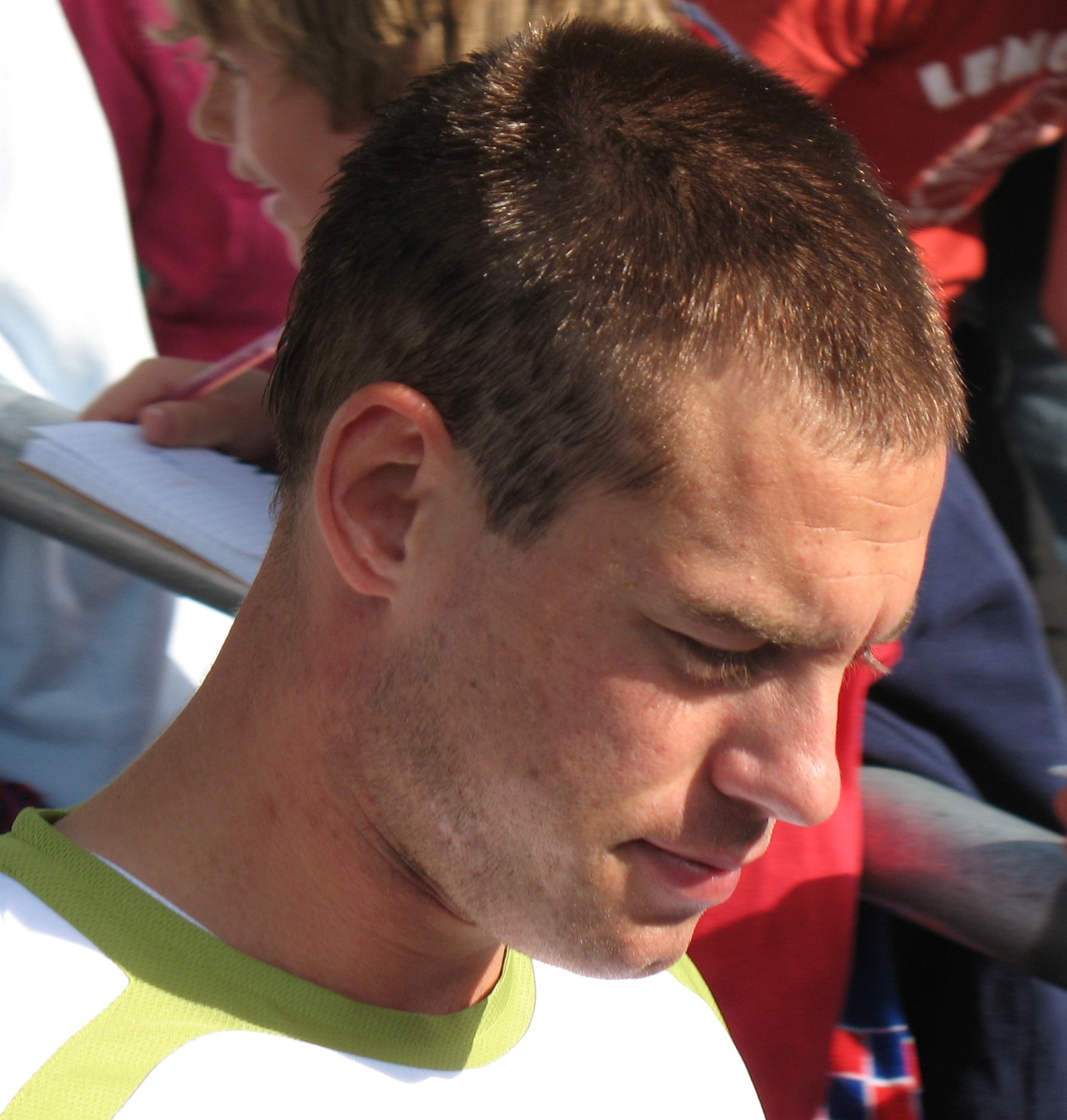

Personal information
- Date of birth: 19 February 1981 (age 45)
- Place of birth: Oslo, Norway
- Height: 1.84 m (6 ft 0 in)
- Position: Central midfielder

Team information
- Current team: KFUM Oslo (assistant manager)

Youth career
- Vålerenga

Senior career*
Years	Team	Apps	(Gls)
1998–2002	SC Heerenveen	36	(0)
2001–2002	→ BV Veendam (loan)	12	(0)
2002–2007	Vålerenga	96	(2)
2008–2011	Molde	68	(3)
2011	→ Tromsø (loan)	11	(0)
2012	Fredrikstad	13	(1)
2014	Nordstrand		
Total		236	(6)

International career
2000–2003	Norway U21	32	(0)
2004–2005	Norway	4	(0)

Managerial career
- 2014–2016: Nordstrand (assistant)
- 2017–2023: Nordstrand
- 2024–: KFUM Oslo (assistant)
- 2026: KFUM Oslo (interim)
- * Club domestic league appearances and goals

Thomas Holm (born 19 February 1981) is a Norwegian former professional footballer. A central midfielder, he played for SC Heerenveen, BV Veendam, Vålerenga, Molde, Tromsø, and Fredrikstad. He is the older half-brother of Vålerenga player Daniel Fredheim Holm.

Holm won the Tippeligaen with Vålerenga in 2005 and with Molde in 2011. He was capped four times for Norway.

== Club career ==
Holm was born in Oslo, and grew up in Trosterud. He played for Vålerenga's youth team but transferred to Eredivisie club SC Heerenveen during the summer of 1998. Holm played as a right back and defensive midfielder under head coach Foppe de Haan, and in 2000 he signed a four-year contract with the club worth 10 million Norwegian kroner.

In the 2001–02 season, Holm was loaned out to BV Veendam., but moved back to Norway and Vålerenga in September 2002. He said that the move, which meant a drop in salary, was due to his belief in Vålerenga's ambitions and their supporters. The head coach of Vålerenga, Kjetil Rekdal had a high view of Holm, and said that he was a talented player with a big future, and the prefect replacement for himself in the midfield after his own retirement. Holm won the Norwegian Cup with Vålerenga in 2002.

Holm was unable to play during most of the 2003 season due to a calf fracture, but in 2004 he was back and was a contributing factor to Vålerenga's good season when they lost the league championship to Rosenborg on goal difference. In the next season, Vålerenga and Holm won the league, one point ahead of Start.

After a less active 2007 season, playing only six league games and fourteen games in total, Holm transferred to Molde. In total he played 145 matches for Vålerenga, and scored three goals. He played sixty league-matches during his first three seasons in Molde, and in 2009 he won silver in both the league and the cup with Molde. Nevertheless, after the 2010 season, Molde tried to sell Holm to other clubs but without any success, and Holm played under the leadership of the new manager Ole Gunnar Solskjær, until he was loaned to Tromsø in August 2011 for the rest of the 2011 season. Thus, Holm was both champion and runner-up of the 2011 Tippeligaen, as Molde won the league while Tromsø finished second.

On 14 January 2012, he signed a two-year contract with Fredrikstad, after leaving Molde on a free transfer, and on 14 April he scored his first goal for the club when Fredrikstad lost 2–1 against Rosenborg at home. He then retired. He became the assistant manager of Nordstrand IF in 2014.

== International career ==
Holm played 38 times for different national youth teams, and 32 times for Norway U21.

After a season with Vålerenga in 2004, Holm made his debut for Norway against Australia at Craven Cottage in November 2004. His teammates at the club, Steffen Iversen, Erik Hagen and Ardian Gashi, were also a part of that national team squad. In total Holm has earned four caps with the Norwegian national team.

== Career statistics ==
Club	Season	Division	League		Cup		Europe		Other		Total	
Club	Season	Division	Apps	Goals	Apps	Goals	Apps	Goals	Apps	Goals	Apps	Goals
Vålerenga	2002	Tippeligaen	4	0	1	0	—		—		5	0
Vålerenga	2003	Tippeligaen	18	1	5	0	—		—		23	1
Vålerenga	2004	Tippeligaen	24	1	3	0	1 (Note: Appearance in the UEFA Cup)	0	3 (Note: Appearances in the Royal League)	0	31	1
Vålerenga	2005	Tippeligaen	21	0	4	1	4 (Note: Three appearances in the UEFA Champions League qualifying rounds and one appearance in the UEFA Cup)	0	8	0	37	1
Vålerenga	2006	Tippeligaen	22	0	3	0	2 (Note: Appearances in the UEFA Champions League qualifying rounds)	0	8	0	35	0
Vålerenga	2007	Tippeligaen	7	0	3	0	4 (Note: Appearances in the UEFA Cup)	0	1	0	15	0
Vålerenga	Total		96	2	19	1	11	0	20	0	146	3
Molde	2008	Tippeligaen	18	0	2	0	—		—		20	0
Molde	2009	Tippeligaen	15	0	2	0	—		—		17	0
Molde	2010	Tippeligaen	27	2	2	0	4 (Note: Appearances in the Europa League)	0	—		33	2
Molde	2011	Tippeligaen	8	1	2	1	—		—		10	2
Molde	Total		68	3	8	1	4	0	—		80	4
Tromsø	2011	Tippeligaen	11	0	0	0	—		—		11	0
Fredrikstad	2012	Tippeligaen	13	1	0	0	—		—		13	1
Career total			188	6	27	2	15	0	20	0	250	8

== Honours ==
Vålerenga

- Tippeligaen: 2005, runner-up 2004
- Norwegian Cup: 2002

Molde

- Tippeligaen: Champion 2011, runner-up 2009
- Norwegian Cup: runner-up 2009

Tromsø

- Tippeligaen: runner-up 2011
