= Jo Inge Berget =

Norwegian footballer (born 1990)

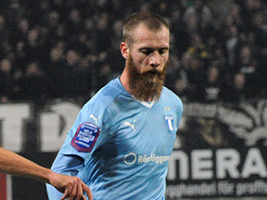
- Berget with Malmö FF in 2015

Personal information
- Full name: Jo Inge Berget
- Date of birth: 11 September 1990 (age 36)
- Place of birth: Hadeland, Norway
- Height: 1.86 m (6 ft 1 in)
- Positions: Winger; forward

Youth career
- –2008: Lyn

Senior career*
Years	Team	Apps	(Gls)
2008	Lyn	2	(0)
2008–2011	Udinese	0	(0)
2009	→ Lyn (loan)	27	(5)
2010–2011	→ Strømsgodset (loan)	31	(8)
2011–2014	Molde	63	(17)
2014–2015	Cardiff City	1	(0)
2014	→ Celtic (loan)	4	(2)
2015–2017	Malmö FF	77	(25)
2018	New York City FC	23	(4)
2019–2022	Malmö FF	96	(15)
2023–2026	Sarpsborg 08	55	(13)

International career^{‡}
2009–2013	Norway U21	22	(7)
2012–2017	Norway	20	(2)
- * Club domestic league appearances and goals as of 2 September 2026 ‡ National team caps and goals as of 14 November 2017

Jo Inge Berget (born 11 September 1990) is a Norwegian professional footballer who plays as a forward. He has played professionally in his homeland, Italy, Wales, Scotland, Sweden and the United States, and made his debut for the Norway national team in 2012.

== Club career ==
=== Early career ===
Berget hails from Gran. He started his senior career at Lyn and played twice before left the club. He signed a reported three-year contract with Udinese in July 2008. The club also signed team-mate Odion Ighalo and they started out playing in the Primavera U20 team.

In March 2009, he was loaned back to Lyn until 2 August. In December 2009, he was loaned to Strømsgodset for one year. In January 2011, his loan was extended to 31 December 2011, but the loan deal was terminated when Berget was sold to Molde in July 2011.

=== Molde ===
Berget signed a three-year deal with Molde in September 2011. Berget made his debut for Molde in a 1–0 win home against Lillestrøm, replacing Mattias Moström in the 74th minute. He scored his first goal in the title-deciding match against Tromsø, where Molde FK celebrated the first league championship in the history of the club. Molde won the 2013 Norwegian Cup after rivals Rosenborg was defeated 4–2 in the final. Jo Inge Berget scored Molde's 2–2 equalizing goal in the 71st minute of the game.

=== Cardiff City and Celtic ===
On 24 January 2014, he signed for Cardiff City, to once again play under the manager Ole Gunnar Solskjær, who was previously his boss at Molde. He made his debut on 15 February in the fifth round of the FA Cup, starting in a 1–2 home defeat to holders Wigan Athletic. A week later he made his Premier League debut in his only other game for the Bluebirds, playing the final 11 minutes in place of Fraizer Campbell at the end of a 0–4 home defeat to Hull City. Cardiff finished the season in 20th position and were relegated to the Championship.

Berget signed a short-term loan deal with Celtic in July 2014, with the option of making the deal permanent in January 2015. He scored twice as Celtic beat Dundee United 6–1 on his home debut. His loan expired on 1 January 2015 and having returned to Cardiff, he left two weeks later after his contract was cancelled by mutual consent.

=== Malmö and New York City ===
On 19 January 2015 he signed a three-year-long contract with Swedish champions Malmö FF. On 19 August 2015, he scored a brace against former club Celtic, in a 3–2 defeat at Celtic Park in the first leg of the Champions League playoffs. He also featured heavily with hard work on the wing in the return leg as Malmö overturned the deficit to win 2–0, rendering Malmö's qualification to the group stage.

On 19 January 2018, Berget signed with Major League Soccer side New York City FC. After just one season in MLS, Berget and New York City mutually parted ways.

In March 2019, Berget signed a three-year contract with Malmö FF.

=== Sarpsborg ===
On 31 August 2023, Berget signed a contract with Sarpsborg 08, for the rest of the 2023 Eliteserien season.

== International career ==
Berget made his debut for Norway on 18 January 2012 at the 2012 King's Cup in Thailand, playing the first half of a 1–0 win over the hosts at the Rajamangala Stadium in Bangkok.

== Career statistics ==
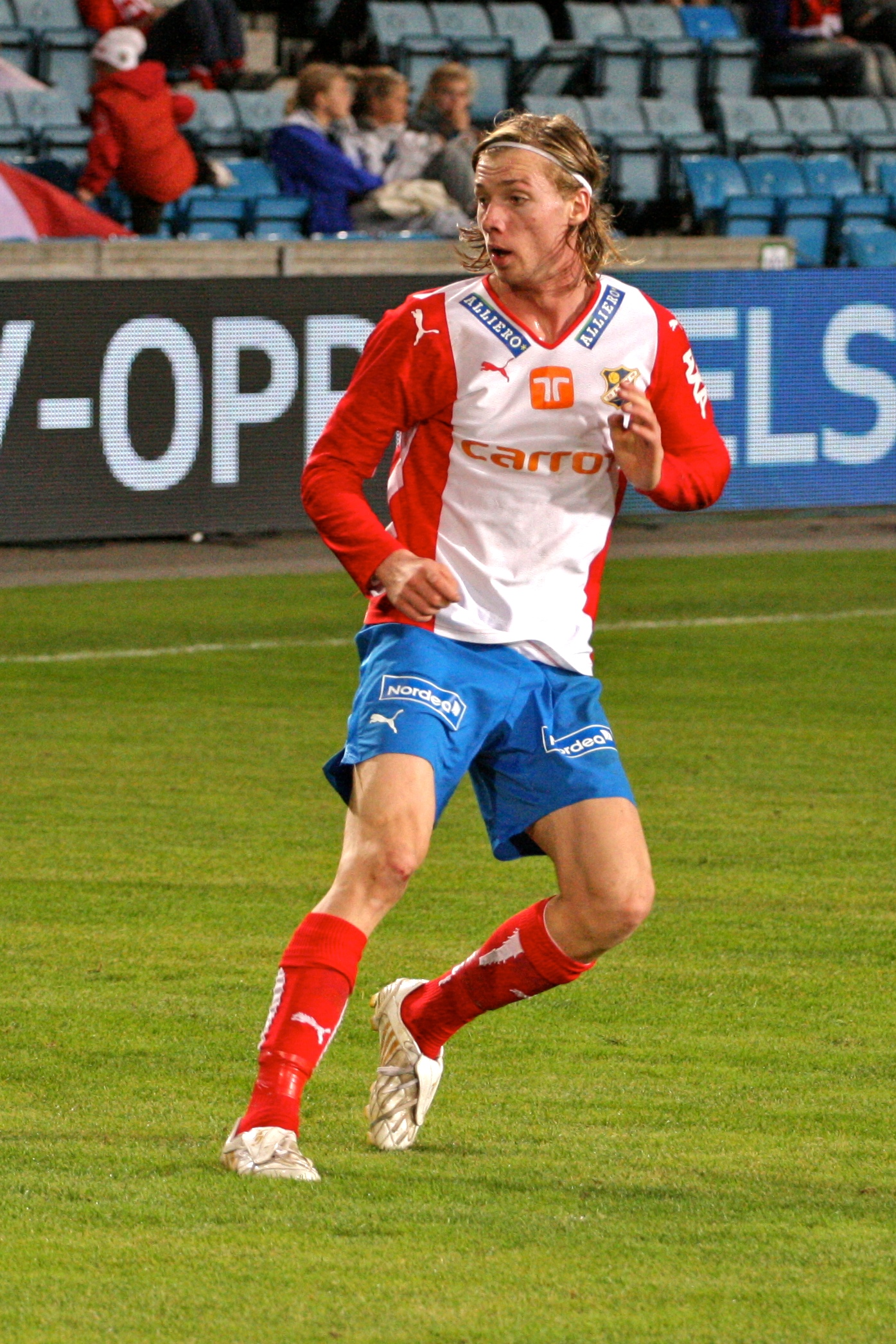
Jo Inge Berget playing for Lyn in 2009.

=== Club ===
As of 27 July 2026

Club	Season	League			National cup (Note: Includes Norwegian Football Cup, Svenska Cupen, FA Cup)		Continental		Total	
Club	Season	Division	Apps	Goals	Apps	Goals	Apps	Goals	Apps	Goals
Lyn	2008	Tippeligaen	2	0	0	0	—		2	0
Udinese	2008–09	Serie A	0	0	0	0	—		0	0
Lyn (loan)	2009	Tippeligaen	27	5	0	0	—		27	5
Strømsgodset (loan)	2010	Tippeligaen	18	6	2	0	—		20	6
Strømsgodset (loan)	2011	Tippeligaen	13	2	0	0	2 (Note: Appearances in UEFA Europa League)	0	15	2
Strømsgodset (loan)	Total		31	8	2	0	2	0	35	8
Molde	2011	Tippeligaen	10	2	0	0	—		10	2
Molde	2012	Tippeligaen	28	8	4	1	9 (Note: Two appearances and one goal in UEFA Champions League, seven appearances and two goals in UEFA Europa League)	3	41	12
Molde	2013	Tippeligaen	25	7	4	1	6 (Note: Four appearances in UEFA Champions League, two appearances in UEFA Europa League)	0	35	8
Molde	Total		63	17	8	2	15	3	86	22
Cardiff City	2013–14	Premier League	1	0	1	0	—		2	0
Celtic (loan)	2014–15	Scottish Premiership	4	2	0	0	4 (Note: Three appearances in UEFA Champions League, one appearance in UEFA Europa League)	0	8	2
Malmö FF	2015	Allsvenskan	27	9	5	4	12 (Note: Appearances in UEFA Champions League)	2	44	15
Malmö FF	2016	Allsvenskan	25	6	7	6	—		32	12
Malmö FF	2017	Allsvenskan	25	10	1	1	2	0	28	11
Malmö FF	Total		77	25	13	11	14	2	104	38
New York City FC	2018	MLS	23	4	1 (Note: Appearance in the MLS Cup Playoffs)	0	—		24	4
Malmö FF	2019	Allsvenskan	24	2	1	1	11	1	36	4
Malmö FF	2020	Allsvenskan	23	6	4	0	4	2	31	8
Malmö FF	2021	Allsvenskan	27	5	4	0	12	1	43	6
Malmö FF	2022	Allsvenskan	22	2	7	1	11	0	40	3
Malmö FF	Total		96	15	16	2	38	4	150	21
Sarpsborg 08	2023	Eliteserien	7	4	0	0	—		7	4
Sarpsborg 08	2024	Eliteserien	18	4	1	0	—		19	4
Sarpsborg 08	2025	Eliteserien	22	5	3	3	—		25	8
Sarpsborg 08	2026	Eliteserien	8	0	1	0	—		9	0
Sarpsborg 08	Total		55	13	5	3	0	0	60	16
Career total			369	88	47	17	73	9	498	118

=== International ===
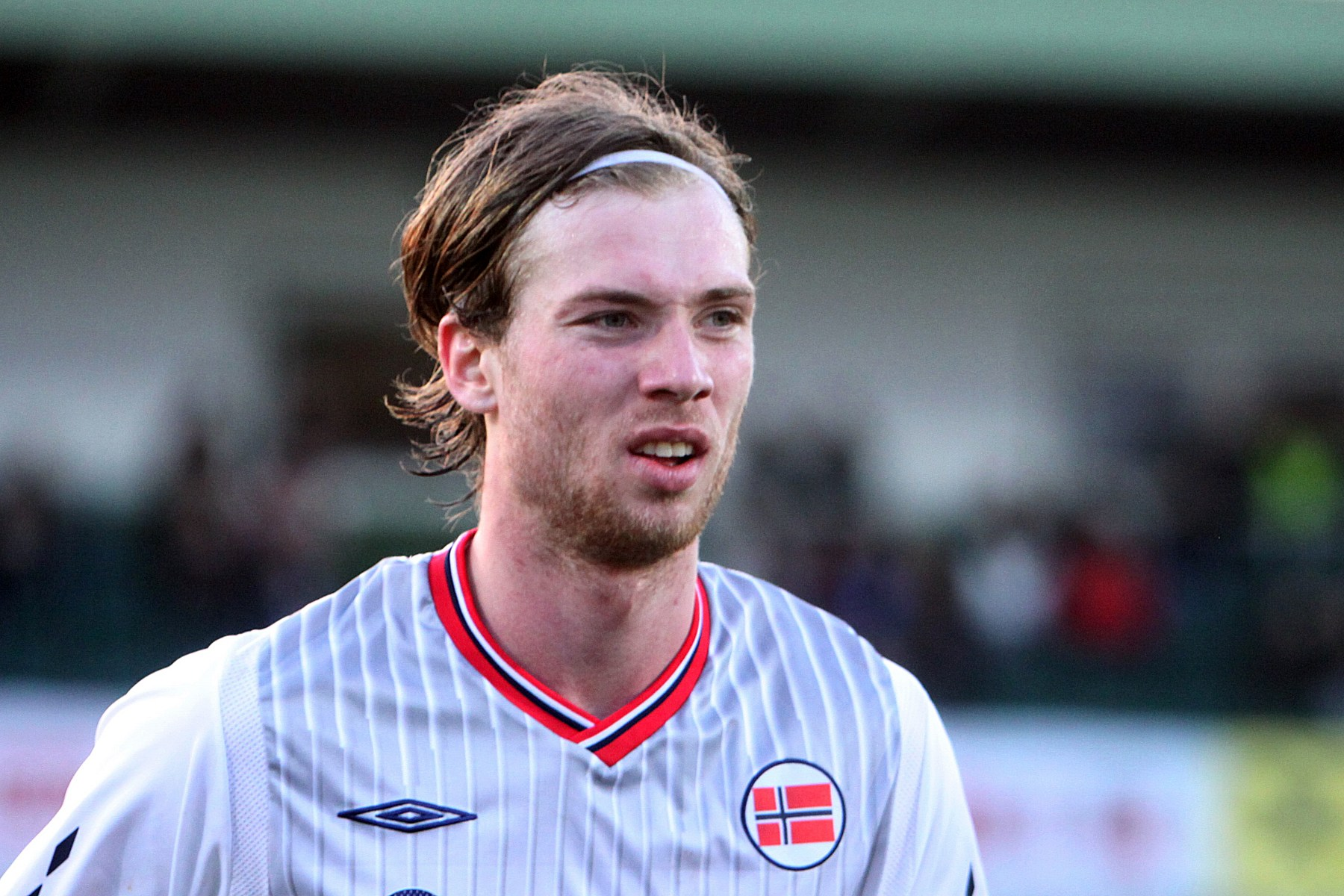
Berget playing for Norway U21 in 2011.

As of match played 14 November 2017

Appearances and goals by national team and year

National team	Year	Apps	Goals
Norway	2012	1	0
Norway	2013	1	0
Norway	2014	2	0
Norway	2015	6	1
Norway	2016	6	1
Norway	2017	4	0
Total		20	2

International goals

Scores and results list Norway's goal tally first.

Goal	Date	Venue	Opponent	Score	Result	Competition
1.	6 September 2015	Ullevaal Stadion, Oslo, Norway	Croatia	1–0	2–0^{[1]}	2016 UEFA Euro Qualification
2.	29 March 2016	Ullevaal Stadion, Oslo, Norway	Finland	1–0	2–0	Friendly

^{1} Berget scored both goals, but the second one was credited as Vedran Ćorluka own goal.

== Honours ==
Strømsgodset

- Norwegian Cup: 2010

Molde

- Tippeligaen: 2011, 2012
- Norwegian Cup: 2013

Malmö FF

- Allsvenskan: 2016, 2017, 2020, 2021
- Svenska Cupen: 2021–22

Norway U21

- UEFA European Under-21 Championship bronze: 2013

Individual

- Eliteserien Goal of the Month: June 2025
