= Simon Markeng =

Ethiopian-born Norwegian footballer (born 1992)

Personal information
- Full name: Simon Yihun Stølen Markeng
- Date of birth: 9 September 1992 (age 34)
- Place of birth: Addis Ababa, Ethiopia
- Position: Forward

Youth career
- 1997–2009: Træff

Senior career*
Years	Team	Apps	(Gls)
2010–2012	Molde	2	(0)
2012	→ Kristiansund (loan)	11	(4)
2013	Kristiansund	19	(1)
2014–2016	Træff	52	(11)
2017	Ny-Krohnborg		

International career
2009	Norway U-17	1	(0)
- * Club domestic league appearances and goals as of 22 November 2013

Simon Yihun Stølen Markeng (born 9 September 1992) is a retired Norwegian footballer who played as a forward, notably for Molde in Eliteserien.

== Career ==
Born in Addis Ababa, Ethiopia, Markeng grew up in Molde where he played youth football for SK Træff. In 2009, he was promoted to the first-team squad by head coach Erik Brakstad and made a few appearances for Træff in the 3. divisjon before he moved to Molde FK.

Markeng's debut for Molde was away against Vålerenga on 12 April 2010, when he got to play a few minutes. Three days later, played 45 minutes against Strømsgodset. Markeng spent the 2012 season on loan with Kristiansund, when the team won promotion to the 1. divisjon. Ahead of the 2013 season he made a permanent transfer to Kristiansund, where he received limited playing time in the 1. Divisjon.

Markeng then moved back to his old club Træff ahead of the 2014 season, who now played in the 2. divisjon. Markeng wanted to step down a level to earn more playing time and the head coach Brakstad stated that he thought Markeng would be their top goalscorer that season. After three seasons in Træff, Markeng finished his career with a short spell in Bergen's Ny-Krohnborg IL.

Markeng made one appearance for the Norwegian under-17 team, when he played against Germany U-17 on 10 January 2009.

== Career statistics ==
Season	Club	Division	League		Cup		Total	
Season	Club	Division	Apps	Goals	Apps	Goals	Apps	Goals
2010	Molde	Eliteserien	2	0	1	0	3	0
2011	Molde	Eliteserien	0	0	0	0	0	0
2012	Molde	Eliteserien	0	0	0	0	0	0
2012	Kristiansund	2. divisjon	11	4	0	0	11	4
2013	Kristiansund	1. divisjon	19	1	1	0	20	1
2014	Træff	2. divisjon	19	5	2	1	21	6
Career Total			51	10	4	1	55	11
