= Sean Cunningham (soccer) =

American soccer player

Personal information
- Full name: Sean Patrick Cunningham
- Date of birth: January 24, 1993 (age 33)
- Place of birth: Troy, Michigan, United States
- Height: 1.88 m (6 ft 2 in)
- Position: Fullback

Youth career
- 2007–2011: Derby County Wolves

Senior career*
Years	Team	Apps	(Gls)
2011–2013	Molde	0	(0)
2012	→ Stabæk (loan)	18	(0)

International career^{‡}
2011	United States U20	1	(0)
- * Club domestic league appearances and goals as of July 22, 2013 ‡ National team caps and goals as of February 28, 2012

Sean Patrick Cunningham (born January 24, 1993) is an American soccer player who is a free agent after being released from Molde in July 2013.

== Career ==
Cunningham was born in Troy, Michigan, and played soccer with Derby County Wolves Soccer Club and originally committed to play at the University of Michigan before he signed for Molde ahead of the 2011 season. He has not yet made his debut for Molde in the league, but played three matches in the 2011 Norwegian Cup. Ahead of the 2012 season, Ole Gunnar Solskjær the manager of Molde, stated that he wanted Cunningham on loan to another Tippeliga-club during the season to get match-training. On 7 March 2012 it was announced that Cunningham had joined Stabæk on a season-long loan deal. In at the start of the 2013 season, Cunningham trained with IL Hødd. In July 2013, Cunningham was released from his contract with Molde with six months remaining and returned to the United States.

Following Cunningham's release from Molde, he went on trial with Seattle Sounders FC, playing in a reserve fixture in July 2013.

== Career statistics ==
Updated on July 21, 2013

Season	Club	Division	League		Cup		Continental		Total	
Season	Club	Division	Apps	Goals	Apps	Goals	Apps	Goals	Apps	Goals
2011	Molde	Tippeligaen	0	0	3	0	–	–	3	0
2012	Stabæk (loan)	Tippeligaen	18	0	3	0	2	0	23	0
2013	Molde	Tippeligaen	0	0	0	0	0	0	0	0
Career Total			18	0	6	0	2	0	26	0

Source: nifs.no
