= Abdou Karim Camara =

Senegalese footballer

Personal information
- Full name: Abdou Karim Camara
- Date of birth: 27 October 1992 (age 34)
- Place of birth: Tambacounda, Senegal
- Height: 1.79 m (5 ft 10 in)
- Position: Midfielder

Youth career
- Diambars

Senior career*
| Years | Team | Apps | (Gls) |
| 2011–2013 | Molde | 7 | (0) |
| 2013–2014 | Cherbourg | 27 | (3) |
| 2015–2017 | Stade Montois | 3 | (0) |
| Total | | 37 | (3) |
- * Club domestic league appearances and goals

Abdou Karim Camara (born 27 October 1992) is a Senegalese former professional footballer who played as a midfielder for Norwegian club Molde and French clubs AS Cherbourg and Stade Montois.

== Career ==
Camara was born in Tambacounda, and played four years at the Diambars-academy. Together with Mamadou Gando Ba, Camara signed for Molde in August 2011. He made his debut in Tippeligaen against Sogndal in the decisive match of the 2011 season.

Camara joined Cherbourg in August 2013.

== Career statistics ==
Appearances and goals by club, season and competition
| Season | Club | League | | | Cup | | Total | |
| Season | Club | Division | Apps | Goals | Apps | Goals | Apps | Goals |
|---|---|---|---|---|---|---|---|---|
| Molde | 2011 | Tippeligaen | 1 | 0 | 0 | 0 | 1 | 0 |
| Molde | 2012 | Tippeligaen | 6 | 0 | 3 | 0 | 9 | 0 |
| Molde | Total | | 7 | 0 | 3 | 0 | 10 | 0 |
| Cherbourg | 2013–14 | CFA | 27 | 3 | 1 | 0 | 28 | 3 |
| Stade Montois | 2015–16 | CFA | 1 | 0 | 1 | 0 | 2 | 0 |
| Stade Montois | 2016–17 | CFA | 2 | 0 | 0 | 0 | 2 | 0 |
| Stade Montois | Total | | 3 | 0 | 1 | 0 | 4 | 0 |
| Career total | | | 37 | 3 | 5 | 0 | 42 | 3 |
