= 2005 Molde FK season =

Molde
2005 season
- Chairman: Oddne Hansen
- Head coach: Bo Johansson
- Stadium: Molde Stadion
- Tippeligaen: 12th
- Norwegian Cup: Winners
- Top goalscorer: League: Rob Friend (10); All: Rob Friend (14)
- Highest home attendance: 11,167 vs Aalesund (16 May 2005)
- Lowest home attendance: 4,525 vs Tromsø (5 May 2005)
- Average home league attendance: 6,512

The 2005 season was Molde's 30th season in the top flight of Norwegian football. In Tippeligaen they finished 12th and played off against Moss to avoid relegation.

Molde won the Norwegian Cup. On 6 November they won the Cup Final against Lillestrøm. The final score was 4–2 after extra time.

== Squad ==
Note: Flags indicate national team as defined under FIFA eligibility rules; some limited exceptions apply. Players may hold more than one non-FIFA nationality.

No.	Pos.	Nation	Player
1	GK	NOR	Knut Dørum Lillebakk
2	DF	NOR	Martin Høyem
3	DF	SWE	Marcus Andreasson
4	DF	FIN	Toni Kallio
5	DF	NOR	Øyvind Gjerde
6	MF	NOR	Daniel Berg Hestad (Captain)
7	MF	NOR	Thomas Mork
8	MF	NOR	Dag Roar Ørsal
9	FW	CAN	Rob Friend
10	MF	NOR	Stian Ohr
11	MF	NOR	Tommy Eide Møster
12	GK	NOR	Lars Ivar Moldskred
14	MF	NOR	John Andreas Husøy
15	MF	NOR	Petter Rudi

No.	Pos.	Nation	Player
16	DF	NOR	Erlend Ormbostad
17	DF	NOR	Trond Strande
18	MF	NOR	Øyvind Gram
19	DF	NOR	Knut Olav Rindarøy
20	FW	NOR	Kai Røberg
21	FW	NOR	Johan Nås
23	DF	NOR	Torgeir Ruud Ramsli
24	DF	SVN	Matej Mavric
25	MF	SVN	Mitja Brulc
26	FW	SEN	Madiou Konate
33	DF	NOR	Petter Christian Singsaas
—	MF	SWE	Magnus Kihlberg

As of end of season.

== Competitions ==
=== Tippeligaen ===
==== Results summary ====
Overall								Home						Away					
Pld	W	D	L	GF	GA	GD	Pts	W	D	L	GF	GA	GD	W	D	L	GF	GA	GD
26	8	6	12	40	46	−6	30	6	3	4	24	17	+7	2	3	8	16	29	−13

Last updated: 7 April 2018.

==== Results by round ====
Round	1	2	3	4	5	6	7	8	9	10	11	12	13	14	15	16	17	18	19	20	21	22	23	24	25	26
Ground	A	H	H	A	H	A	H	A	H	A	H	A	H	H	A	A	H	A	H	A	H	A	H	A	H	A
Result	L	L	L	L	W	W	D	D	D	L	W	L	W	W	L	L	L	L	L	W	W	L	W	D	D	D
Position	14	14	14	14	14	12	12	11	12	12	10	11	9	9	9	10	10	11	12	11	9	11	11	11	11	12

Source: see below
A = Away; H = Home; W = Win; D = Draw; L = Loss

==== Results ====
11 April 2005 1	Brann	2 – 0	Molde	Bergen
19:00 CET (UTC+1)	Scharner 31'; Sæternes (yellow card) 44'; Winters 63'	Report		Stadium: Brann Stadion; Attendance: 14,106; Referee: Brage Sandmoen, Kjelsås

17 April 2005 2	Molde	0 – 1	Start	Molde
18:00 CET (UTC+1)		Report	Hardarson (yellow card) 8'; Garba 31'	Stadium: Molde Stadion; Attendance: 6,087; Referee: Tommy Skjerven, Kaupanger

24 April 2005 3	Molde	1 – 3	Vålerenga	Molde
18:00 CET (UTC+1)	Kihlberg 42'	Report	Holm (yellow card) 3'; Berre 62'; Holm 70'; Johnsen 73'	Stadium: Molde Stadion; Attendance: 6,097; Referee: Espen Berntsen, Fart

1 May 2005 4	Lyn	6 – 1	Molde	Oslo
18:00 CET (UTC+1)	Leonhardsen 21'; Mikel 38' (yellow card) 39'; Hamoud (yellow card) 67'; Sørensen 68'; Larsen 84'; Tessem 87', 90' (pen.); Sokolowski (yellow card) 90'	Report	Kihlberg 30'; Ramsli (yellow card) 90+2'	Stadium: Ullevaal Stadion; Attendance: 4,639; Referee: Øyvind Alapnes, Finnsnes

5 May 2005 5	Molde	2 – 1	Tromsø	Molde
18:00 CET (UTC+1)	Ohr 4'; Friend; 81' Mavric (yellow card) 86'; Kallio (yellow card) 90'	Report	Årst 22'; Essediri (yellow card) 60'	Stadium: Molde Stadion; Attendance: 4,525; Referee: Svein-Erik Edvartsen, Hamar

8 May 2005 6	Viking	2 – 3	Molde	Stavanger
18:00 CET (UTC+1)	Kovács (yellow card) 3'; Mumba 35'; Kopteff 75'	Report	Ohr 6'; Kihlberg 85' (yellow card) 90'; Kallio (yellow card) 86'; Ørsal 87'	Stadium: Viking Stadion; Attendance: 12,157; Referee: Brage Sandmoen, Kjelsås

16 May 2005 7	Molde	2 – 2	Aalesund	Molde
18:00 CET (UTC+1)	Kallio 1'; Kihlberg (yellow card) 37'; Husøy 54'; Mork (yellow card) 69' (red card) 90'	Report	M'Baye 80'; Fjørtoft (yellow card) 84'; Moldskred 88'; Ekeberg (yellow card) 90'	Stadium: Molde Stadion; Attendance: 11,167; Referee: Tom Henning Øvrebø, Nordstrand

22 May 2005 8	Rosenborg	1 – 1	Molde	Trondheim
18:00 CET (UTC+1)	Skjelbred (yellow card) 10' (red card); Strand 37'; Dorsin (yellow card) 67'; Winsnes (yellow card) 78'	Report	Kallio (yellow card) 22'; Friend 72'	Stadium: Lerkendal Stadion; Attendance: 15,730; Referee: Brage Sandmoen, Kjelsås

29 May 2005 9	Molde	1 – 1	Bodø/Glimt	Molde
18:00 CET (UTC+1)	Husøy (yellow card) 46'; Strande (yellow card) 73'; Friend 77'	Report	Ludvigsen (yellow card) 58'; Kjølner (yellow card) 76'; Berg 88'; Paulsen (yellow card) 90'	Stadium: Molde Stadion; Attendance: 4,711; Referee: Kjetil Sælen, Arna-Bjørnar

12 June 2005 10	Odd Grenland	2 – 1	Molde	Skien
18:00 CET (UTC+1)	Amundsen (yellow card) 8'; Tchoyi (yellow card) 21'; Nilsson 30' de Ornelas 42'; Occéan (yellow card) 57'	Report	Kallio 46' (yellow card) 62'	Stadium: Odd Stadion; Attendance: 3,051; Referee: Tom Henning Øvrebø, Nordstrand

19 June 2005 11	Molde	2 – 1	Fredrikstad	Molde
18:00 CET (UTC+1)	Ørsal (yellow card) 18'; Friend 24'; Kallio (yellow card) 36'; Mavric 81' (pen.)	Report	Brenne (yellow card) 52'; Mavric 77' (o.g.); Czwartek (yellow card) 81'	Stadium: Molde Stadion; Attendance: 4,749; Referee: Stig Rune Krokdal, Nessegutten

26 June 2005 12	HamKam	4 – 1	Molde	Hamar
18:00 CET (UTC+1)	Michaelsen 18', 44' (pen.); Bjerke (yellow card) 61'; Dokken 75'; Olsen 77'; Corrales (yellow card) 82'	Report	Friend 63', (yellow card) 80'	Stadium: Briskeby Stadion; Attendance: 4,853; Referee: Øyvind Alapnes, Finnsnes

3 July 2005 13	Molde	2 – 0	Lillestrøm	Molde
18:00 CET (UTC+1)	Mavric 26' (pen.); Friend (yellow card) 31'; Konate (yellow card) 65', (goal) 86'	Report	Koren (yellow card) 88'; Wehrman (yellow card) 90'	Stadium: Molde Stadion; Attendance: 5,715; Referee: Tom Henning Øvrebø, Nordstrand

23 July 2005 14	Molde	3 – 1	Brann	Molde
16:00 CET (UTC+1)	Ohr 14'; Rudi 19'; Kallio 53'	Report	Winters 51', (yellow card) 62'; Haugen (yellow card) 62'	Stadium: Molde Stadion; Attendance: 10,309; Referee: Kjell Alseth, Stjørdals-Blink

31 July 2005 15	Start	1 – 0	Molde	Kristiansand
18:00 CET (UTC+1)	Pedersen 71'; Hæstad (yellow card) 74'	Report	Ohr (yellow card) 35'; Møster (yellow card) 45'; Friend (yellow card) 59'	Stadium: Kristiansand Stadion; Attendance: 10,248; Referee: Jonny Ditlefsen, Mo

3 August 2005 16	Vålerenga	v	Molde	Oslo
18:00 CET (UTC+1)				Stadium: Ullevaal Stadion
Note: Match postponned due to Vålerenga's qualification game vs. Haka in the 2005–06 UEFA Champions League.

7 August 2005 17	Molde	1 – 3	Lyn	Molde
18:00 CET (UTC+1)	Ohr (yellow card) 24'; Mork 36'; Mavric (yellow card) 40'	Report	Ortiz (yellow card) 49'; Huusko 73', 86'; Larsen (yellow card) 77'; Tessem 90' (pen.)	Stadium: Molde Stadion; Attendance: 5,526; Referee: Kjetil Sælen, Arna-Bjørnar

14 August 2005 18	Tromsø	2 – 1	Molde	Tromsø
18:00 CET (UTC+1)	Kibebe 13'; Årst 77'	Report	Ohr 22'; Husøy (yellow card) 44'; Konate (yellow card) 86' (red card)	Stadium: Alfheim Stadion; Attendance: 4,621; Referee: Roy Helge Olsen, Flekkerøy

28 August 2005 19	Molde	1 – 2	Viking	Molde
18:00 CET (UTC+1)	Ohr 30'	Report	Nygaard (yellow card) 44'; Nhleko 49'; Østenstad 58'	Stadium: Molde Stadion; Attendance: 5,119; Referee: Tom Henning Øvrebø, Nordstrand

10 September 2005 16	Vålerenga	3 – 1	Molde	Oslo
16:00 CET (UTC+1)	Grindheim 26'; Brocken 35'; Gashi 64'	Report	Rudi (yellow card) 48'; Ohr 56'; Kihlberg (yellow card) 60'; Singsaas (yellow card) 63'; Lillebakk (yellow card) 65'; Gjerde (yellow card) 78'	Stadium: Ullevaal Stadion; Attendance: 14,152; Referee: Svein Oddvar Moen, Haugar

13 September 2005 20	Aalesund	1 – 4	Molde	Ålesund
19:00 CET (UTC+1)	Fredriksen (yellow card) 56'; Aarøy 69'; Guðmundsson (yellow card) 69'	Report	Singsaas (yellow card) 32'; Eide Møster 37'; Strande 49'; Ohr 76', (yellow card) 83'; Konate (yellow card) 88', (goal) 90'	Stadium: Color Line Stadion; Attendance: 10,775; Referee: Brage Sandmoen, Kjelsås

17 September 2005 21	Molde	4 – 1	Rosenborg	Molde
16:30 CET (UTC+1)	Hestad 2'; Mavric 45' (pen.); Friend 70'; Rudi 73'; Strande (yellow card) 78'	Report	Bjørn Tore Kvarme (yellow card) 42'; Dorsin (red card) 45'; Ståle Stensaas 53'; Braaten (yellow card) 78'	Stadium: Molde Stadion; Attendance: 8,435; Referee: Per Ivar Staberg, Malmefjorden

26 September 2005 22	Bodø/Glimt	2 – 0	Molde	Bodø
19:00 CET (UTC+1)	Brattbakk 1'; Olsen 27'; Paulsen (yellow card) 60'	Report	Husøy (yellow card) 61'; Hestad (yellow card) 86'	Stadium: Aspmyra Stadion; Attendance: 3,287; Referee: Bjørn Gunnar Sælen, Bjørnar

2 October 2005 23	Molde	4 – 0	Odd Grenland	Molde
18:00 CET (UTC+1)	Andreasson 13'; Friend 18', 44'; Rudi 65' (pen.)	Report	Suffo (yellow card) 14'; Fevang (yellow card) 35'; Larsen (yellow card) 45'	Stadium: Molde Stadion; Attendance: 5,957; Referee: Roy Helge Olsen, Flekkerøy

16 October 2005 24	Fredrikstad	1 – 1	Molde	Fredrikstad
18:00 CET (UTC+1)	Wiig 83'; West (yellow card) 90'	Report	Hestad 42'	Stadium: Fredrikstad Stadion; Attendance: 8,487; Referee: Tom Henning Øvrebø, Nordstrand

23 October 2005 25	Molde	1 – 1	HamKam	Molde
18:00 CET (UTC+1)	Strande (yellow card) 20'; Hestad 59'	Report	Haug 24'; Moen (yellow card) 68'	Stadium: Molde Stadion; Attendance: 6,202; Referee: Svein Oddvar Moen, Haugar

29 October 2005 26	Lillestrøm	2 – 2	Molde	Lillestrøm
18:00 CET (UTC+1)	Koren 5'; Strand 76'	Report	Kihlberg (yellow card) 13'; Singsaas (yellow card) 48'; Friend 77', 90', (yellow card) 82'; Konate (yellow card) 90'	Stadium: Åråsen Stadion; Attendance: 7,950; Referee: Espen Berntsen, Fart

==== League table ====
Pos	Team	Pld	W	D	L	GF	GA	GD	Pts	Qualification or relegation
10	Ham-Kam	26	8	7	11	31	37	−6	31	
11	Fredrikstad	26	8	7	11	35	44	−9	31	
12	Molde (Note: Molde qualified for the UEFA Cup second qualifying round as winners of the Norwegian Cup.) (O)	26	8	6	12	40	46	−6	30	UEFA Cup second qualifying round and relegation play-offs
13	Aalesund (R)	26	6	9	11	30	42	−12	27	Relegation to First Division
14	Bodø/Glimt (R)	26	6	6	14	29	45	−16	24	Relegation to First Division

Source: fotball.no
Rules for classification: 1) points; 2) goal difference; 3) number of goals scored.
(O) Play-off winners; (R) Relegated

=== Relegation play-offs ===
13 November 2005 1st Leg	Moss	2 – 3	Molde	Moss
13:00 CEST (UTC+1)	Fredriksen 7', (yellow card) 13'; Michelsen 67' (pen.)	Report	Andreasson 16'; Mavric (yellow card) 26'; Konate 39', 42'; Ohr (yellow card) 90'	Stadium: Melløs Stadion; Attendance: 4,022; Referee: Tommy Skjerven, Kaupanger

19 November 2005 2nd Leg	Molde	2 – 0 (5–2 agg.)	Moss	Molde
16:00 CEST (UTC+2)	Friend 61'; Mavric 74'	Report	Moen (yellow card) 31'	Stadium: Molde Stadion; Attendance: 6,321; Referee: Terje Hauge, Hordaland

=== Norwegian Cup ===
11 May 2005 First Round	Dahle	0 – 8	Molde	Kristiansund
18:00 CEST (UTC+1)		Report	Mavric 30', 78'; Eide Møster 35', 45', 65'; Husøy 55'; Ørsal 60'; Hoås 87'	Stadium: Dahle Kunstgress; Attendance: 650; Referee: Ole Bjørn Moen, Malmefjorden

19 May 2005 Second Round	Kolstad	1 – 2	Molde	Trondheim
18:00 CEST (UTC+2)	Sisic 27'	Report	Brulc 26'; Ørsal 38' (pen.)	Stadium: Huseby Idrettspark; Attendance: 228; Referee: Pål Jakobsen, Steinkjer

15 June 2005 Third Round	Molde	3 – 2	Nybergsund-Trysil	Molde
18:00 CEST (UTC+2)	Friend 15'; Eide Møster 54', 89'	Report	Storbæk 33'; Teberio 82'	Stadium: Molde Stadion; Attendance: 503; Referee: Dag Vidar Hafsås, Kolstad

29 June 2005 Fourth Round	Bodø/Glimt	1 – 2	Molde	Bodø
18:00 CEST (UTC+2)	Sakariassen 27'	Report	Mavric 7' (pen.); Friend 45'	Stadium: Aspmyra Stadion; Attendance: 1,352; Referee: Per Ivar Staberg, Malmefjorden

20 August 2005 Quarterfinal	Molde	2 – 1	Odd Grenland	Molde
16:00 CEST (UTC+2)	Ohr 31', 69'	Report	Occean 18'	Stadium: Molde Stadion; Attendance: 3,252; Referee: Brage Sandmoen, Kjelsås

22 September 2005 Semifinal	Molde	1 – 0	Hønefoss	Molde
19:00 CEST (UTC+2)	Berg Hestad 74'	Report		Stadium: Molde Stadion; Attendance: 6,925; Referee: Brage Sandmoen, Kjelsås

==== Final ====
6 November 2005 Final	Lillestrøm	2 – 4 (a.e.t.)	Molde	Oslo
13:15 CEST (UTC+2)	Mouelhi 46'; Sundgot 90' (pen.)	Report	Friend 25'; Konate 65'; Berg Hestad 94'; Husøy 108'	Stadium: Ullevaal Stadion; Attendance: 25,182; Referee: Brage Sandmoen (Kjelsås)

== Squad statistics ==
=== Appearances and goals ===
No.	Pos	Nat	Player	Total		Tippeligaen		Norwegian Cup		Relegation play-offs	
No.	Pos	Nat	Player	Apps	Goals	Apps	Goals	Apps	Goals	Apps	Goals
1	GK	(Norway) NOR	Knut Dørum Lillebakk	18	0	11	0	5	0	2	0
2	DF	(Norway) NOR	Martin Høyem	5	0	1+2	0	1+1	0	0	0
3	DF	(Sweden) SWE	Marcus Andreasson	34	2	25	1	7	0	2	1
4	DF	(Finland) FIN	Toni Kallio	28	3	18+4	3	4+1	0	0+1	0
5	DF	(Norway) NOR	Øyvind Gjerde	18	0	10+3	0	3	0	2	0
6	MF	(Norway) NOR	Daniel Berg Hestad	19	5	14	3	3	2	2	0
7	MF	(Norway) NOR	Thomas Mork	18	1	13+1	1	3	0	0+1	0
8	MF	(Norway) NOR	Dag Roar Ørsal	18	3	9+6	1	3	2	0	0
9	FW	(Canada) CAN	Rob Friend	33	14	25	10	6	3	2	1
10	MF	(Norway) NOR	Stian Ohr	32	9	23+2	7	5	2	2	0
11	MF	(Norway) NOR	Tommy Eide Møster	27	6	12+8	1	4+2	5	0+1	0
12	GK	(Norway) NOR	Lars Ivar Moldskred	17	0	15	0	2	0	0	0
14	MF	(Norway) NOR	John Andreas Husøy	26	3	13+4	1	5+2	2	0+2	0
15	MF	(Norway) NOR	Petter Rudi	21	3	16	3	3	0	2	0
16	DF	(Norway) NOR	Erlend Ormbostad	4	0	1+1	0	2	0	0	0
17	DF	(Norway) NOR	Trond Strande	28	1	23	1	4	0	1	0
18	MF	(Norway) NOR	Øyvind Gram	2	0	0	0	0+2	0	0	0
19	DF	(Norway) NOR	Knut Olav Rindarøy	4	0	1+3	0	0	0	0	0
20	FW	(Norway) NOR	Kai Røberg	15	0	4+7	0	3+1	0	0	0
21	FW	(Norway) NOR	Johan Nås	2	0	0+1	0	0+1	0	0	0
23	DF	(Norway) NOR	Torgeir Ruud Ramsli	3	0	0+2	0	0+1	0	0	0
24	DF	(Slovenia) SVN	Matej Mavric	33	7	22+2	3	6+1	3	1+1	1
25	MF	(Slovenia) SVN	Mitja Brulc	4	4	0+1	3	2+1	1	0	0
26	FW	(Senegal) SEN	Madiou Konate	11	5	0+8	2	1	1	2	2
28	MF	(Sweden) SWE	Magnus Kihlberg	31	3	25	3	4	0	2	0
33	DF	(Norway) NOR	Petter Christian Singsaas	9	0	5+1	0	1	0	2	0
Players who left Molde during the season:
33	FW	(Norway) NOR	Torgeir Hoås	2	0	0	0	0+2	0	0	0

=== Goal Scorers ===
Place	Position	Nation	Number	Name	Tippeligaen	Norwegian Cup	Relegation play-offs	Total
1	FW	(Canada)	9	Rob Friend	10	3	1	14
2	FW	(Norway)	10	Stian Ohr	7	2	0	9
3	DF	(Slovenia)	24	Matej Mavric	3	3	1	7
4	MF	(Norway)	11	Tommy Eide Møster	1	5	0	6
5	DF	(Norway)	6	Daniel Berg Hestad	3	2	0	5
5	FW	(Senegal)	26	Madiou Konate	2	1	2	5
7	MF	(Norway)	15	Petter Rudi	3	0	0	3
7	DF	(Finland)	4	Toni Kallio	3	0	0	3
7	MF	(Sweden)	28	Magnus Kihlberg	3	0	0	3
7	MF	(Norway)	14	John Andreas Husøy	1	2	0	3
7	MF	(Norway)	8	Dag Roar Ørsal	1	2	0	3
12	MF	(Sweden)	3	Marcus Andreasson	1	0	1	2
13	MF	(Norway)	7	Thomas Mork	1	0	0	1
13	DF	(Norway)	17	Trond Strande	1	0	0	1
13	MF	(Slovenia)	25	Mitja Brulc	0	1	0	1
13	FW	(Norway)	33	Torgeir Hoås	0	1	0	1
				TOTALS	40	22	5	67

== See also ==
- Molde FK seasons
