= List of Molde FK players =

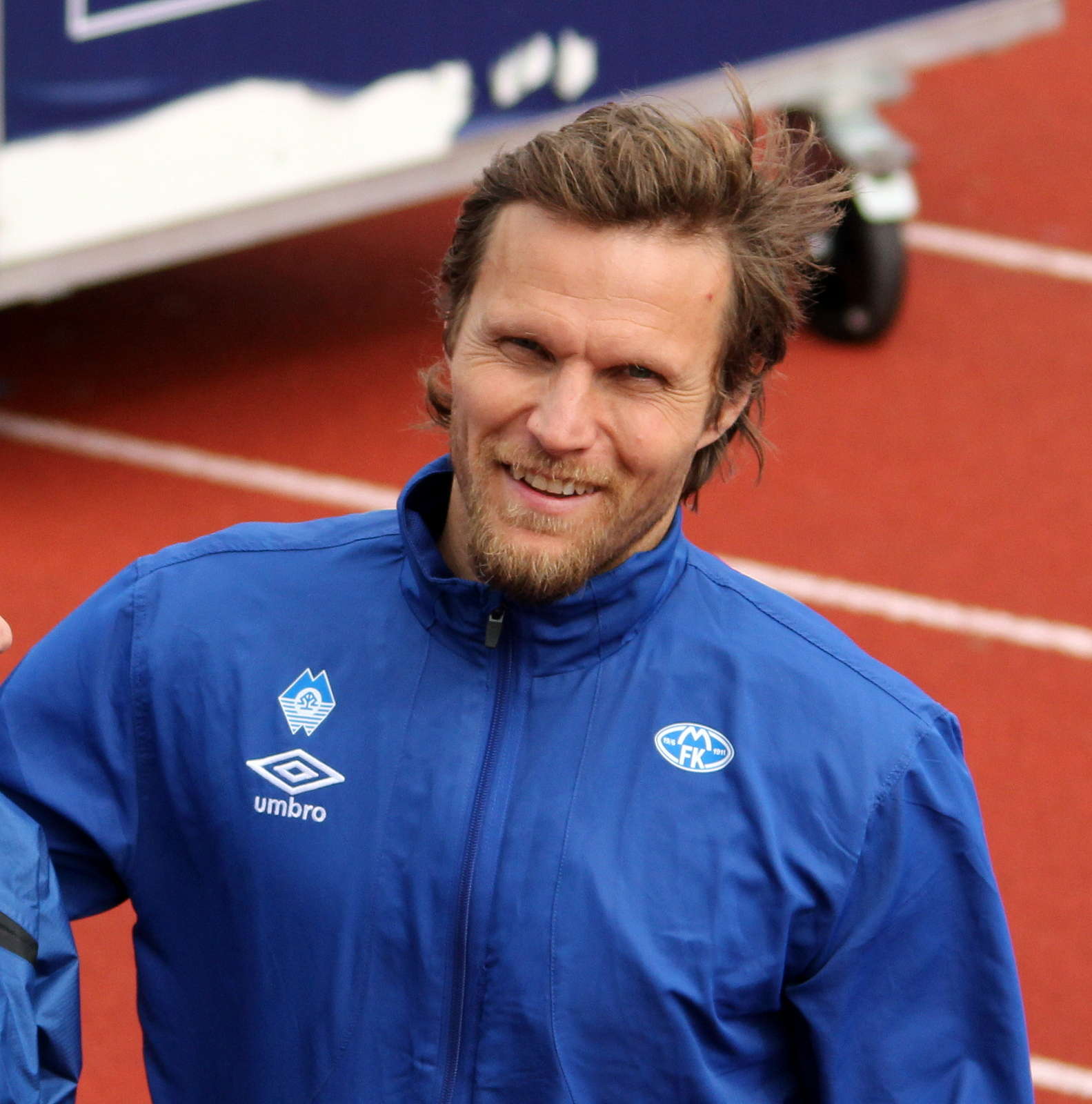
Daniel Berg Hestad made 666 appearances in 23 years for Molde FK.

Molde Fotballklubb, also known simply as Molde FK, is a Norwegian professional football club based in Molde. The club is affiliated with Nordmøre og Romsdal Fotballkrets and play their home games at Aker Stadion. Formed on 19 June 1911, the club have won five national league titles and five national cup titles. Molde participated in the UEFA Champions League in 1999 where they met Real Madrid, Porto and Olympiacos in the group stage. This made them the second Norwegian football club, to have reached the group stage of the competition. Currently playing in Eliteserien, where the season lasts from March to November. They won their first championship in 2011, and defended the title in 2012. In 2014, they won their first league and cup double. Molde also had a successful period from 1994 to 2005, when they won two Norwegian Cup titles, and finished second in the league on four occasions. Since playing their first competitive match, a number of players have made a competitive first-team appearance for the club, of whom a number of players have made at least 100 appearances (including substitute appearances).

Molde's record appearance-maker is Daniel Berg Hestad, who made a total of 666 appearances over a 23-year playing career; he broke his father Stein Olav Hestad's previous appearance record.

== List of players ==
- Appearances and goals are for first-team competitive matches only, including Eliteserien, 1. divisjon, Norwegian Cup, Eliteserien play-offs, Champions League, UEFA Cup/Europa League and Cup Winners' Cup.
- Players are listed according to the date of their first-team debut for the club.

This list is under construction. Statistics correct as of match played 14 December 2023

Table headers

- Nationality – If a player played international football, the country/countries he played for are shown. Otherwise, the player's nationality is given as their country of birth.
- Molde career – The year of the player's first appearance for Molde FK to the year of his last appearance.
- Total – The total number of matches played, both as a starter and as a substitute.

Positions key
GK	Goalkeeper
DF	Defender
MF	Midfielder
FW	Forward
U	Utility player^{1}

Key
§	A minimum number due to lack of information

List of Molde FK players with more than 100 appearances
Name	Nationality	Position	Molde career	Debut	Apps.	Goals	Ref
Jan Fuglset	Norway	FW	1963–1967; 1973–1982	1963	197§	174	
Stein Olav Hestad	Norway	MF	1971–1989	1 May 1971	361§	68§	
Inge Bratteteig	Norway	GK	1975–1987	1975	172§	1	
Åge Hareide	Norway	DF	1975–1981; 1984–1987	1975	168§	31§	
Ulrich Møller	Norway	DF	1980–1994	15 May 1980	349§	10§	
Jan Berg	Norway	MF	1981–1988; 1991–1995	1981	180§	47§	
Knut Hallvard Eikrem	Norway	DF	1984–1990	29 April 1984	132§	1§	
Ole Erik Stavrum	Norway	DF	1986–1990; 1995–1997	31 May 1986	154§	11§	
Øystein Neerland	Norway	FW	1987–1993	2 May 1987	123§	34§	
Sindre Rekdal	Norway	MF	1988–1998	3 July 1988	127§	9§	
Morten Kristiansen	Norway	MF	1988–1993	30 April 1989	104§	6§	
Morten Bakke	Norway	GK	1991–2001	28 April 1991	317§	1	
Trond Strande	Norway	DF	1991–2007	28 April 1991	328§	12§	
Ole Bjørn Sundgot	Norway	FW	1991–1996; 1997–2000	28 April 1991	162§	57§	
Petter Rudi	Norway	MF	1991–1997; 2000–2001; 2004–2006	12 May 1991	264§	18§	
Daniel Berg Hestad	Norway	MF	1993–2003; 2005–2016	23 May 1993	666	107	
Knut Anders Fostervold	Norway	DF	1994–2002	1 May 1994	191§	13§	
Anders Hasselgård	Norway	MF	1995–2004	22 October 1995	124§	12§	
Petter Christian Singsaas	Norway	DF	1995–2003; 2006–2007	22 April 1995	217§	4	
Odd Inge Olsen	Norway	MF	1997–2001	14 April 1996	171§	46§	
Karl Oskar Fjørtoft	Norway	MF	1997–2002	8 May 1997	159§	15§	
Bernt Hulsker	Norway	FW	1999–2004	1 August 1999	133	48	
Magne Hoseth	Norway	MF	1999–2004; 2006–2014	5 May 1999	364	118	
Marcus Andreasson	Sweden	DF	2004–2010	12 April 2004	164	6	
Øyvind Gjerde	Norway	DF	2004–2010	27 May 2004	110	6	
Knut Olav Rindarøy	Norway	DF	2004–2017	4 July 2004	269	5	
Jan Kjell Larsen	Norway	GK	2006–2010	9 April 2006	107	0	
Mattias Moström	Sweden	MF	2007–2020	9 April 2007	368	37	
Vegard Forren	Norway	DF	2007–2019	26 August 2007	384	18	
Kristoffer Paulsen Vatshaug	Norway	DF	2008–2013	30 March 2008	159	2	
Magne Simonsen	Norway	DF	2010–2015	14 March 2010	108	6	
Daniel Chima Chukwu	Nigeria	FW	2010–2014; 2018	1 August 2010	163	56	
Magnus Wolff Eikrem	Norway	MF	2011–2013; 2018–	18 March 2011	279	65	
Martin Linnes	Norway	DF	2012–2015; 2022–	23 March 2012	229	27	
Etzaz Hussain	Pakistan	MF	2012–2015; 2017–2022	4 August 2012	295	38	
Eirik Hestad	Norway	MF	2012–2021, 2023–	25 October 2012	245	39	
Sander Svendsen	Norway	FW	2013–2017	9 May 2013	103	25	
Joona Toivio	Finland	DF	2013–2017	15 March 2013	127	14	
Harmeet Singh	Norway	MF	2014–2016	28 March 2014	102	10	
Ruben Gabrielsen	Norway	DF	2014–2019	31 July 2014	171	8	
Andreas Linde	Sweden	GK	2015–2021	21 July 2015	177	0	
Fredrik Aursnes	Norway	MF	2016–2021	18 February 2016	192	20	
Kristoffer Haugen	Norway	DF	2018–	11 March 2018	182	20	
Martin Bjørnbak	Norway	DF	2019–	31 March 2019	143	5	
Erling Knudtzon	Norway	FW	2019–2023	31 March 2019	167	10	
Ohi Omoijuanfo	Norway	FW	2019–2021	31 March 2019	104	61	
Ola Brynhildsen	Norway	FW	2020–2023	16 June 2020	137	42	
Martin Ellingsen	Norway	MF	2017–2023	20 August 2017	118	19	
Emil Breivik	Norway	MF	2019–	1 May 2019	123	15	
Magnus Grødem	Norway	MF	2021–	16 May 2021	113	27	

== Most top division matches played ==
This is a list of players who has played more than 100 games for Molde in the top division. For a list of all Molde FK players with a Wikipedia article, see the Molde FK players' category. Players are listed according to total number of league games played. Substitute appearances included.

Player	Years	Matches
Daniel Berg Hestad	1993–2016	473
Vegard Forren	2007–2019	286
Mattias Moström	2007–2020	273
Magne Hoseth	1999–2014	260
Ulrich Møller	1980–1994	250
Stein Olav Hestad	1971–1989	249
Trond Strande	1991–2007	238
Morten Bakke	1991–2001	235
Etzaz Hussain	2012–2022	202
Petter Rudi	1991–2006	199
Knut Olav Rindarøy	2004–2017	186
Thomas Mork	1997–2008	186
Åge Hareide	1975–1987	181
Magnus Wolff Eikrem	2011–present	178
Knut Anders Fostervold	1995–2002	172
Inge Bratteteig	1975–1987	169
Eirik Hestad	2013–2021	161
Petter Christian Singsaas	1995–2007	153
Jan Berg	1982–1995	150
Fredrik Aursnes	2016–2021	149
Ole Erik Stavrum	1986–1997	149
Karl Oskar Fjørtoft	1997–2002	145
Odd Inge Olsen	1996–2001	143
Martin Linnes	2012–present	138
Ole Bjørn Sundgot	1991–1999	134
Ruben Gabrielsen	2014–2019	132
Knut Hallvard Eikrem	1984–1990	131
Kristoffer Paulsen Vatshaug	2008–2013	130
Sindre Rekdal	1988–1998	123
Einar Sekkesæter	1970–1983	121
Øystein Neerland	1987–1993	120
Daniel Chima Chukwu	2010–2019	118
Anders Hasselgård	1997–2004	118
Jan Fuglset	1973–1982	116
Tor Gunnar Hagbø	1978–1990	116
Marcus Andreasson	2004–2010	115
Pape Paté Diouf	2006–2016	115
Bernt Hulsker	1999–2004	112
Geir Sperre	1986–1991	108
Rune Ulvestad	1978–1986	107
Trond Andersen	1995–1999	105
Kristoffer Haugen	2018–present	105
Morten Kristiansen	1989–1993	105
Torkild Brakstad	1963–1978	104
Odd Ivar Moen	1974–1986	103
Harry Hestad	1962–1980	102

Last updated: 13 November 2022

== Most top division goals scored ==
This is a list of players who has scored 10 goals or more for Molde in the top division.

Player	Years	Goals
Magne Hoseth	1999–2014	84
Daniel Berg Hestad	1993–2016	71
Jan Fuglset	1973–1982	57
Ohi Omoijuanfo	2019–2021	54
Ole Bjørn Sundgot	1991–1999	47
Andreas Lund	1996–2000	42
Odd Inge Olsen	1996–2001	41
Magnus Wolff Eikrem	2011–present	39
Øystein Neerland	1987–1993	35
Daniel Chima Chukwu	2010–2019	34
Pape Paté Diouf	2006–2012	34
Leke James	2018–2020	33
Åge Hareide	1975–1987	31
Bernt Hulsker	1999–2004	31
Ole Gunnar Solskjær	1995–1996	31
Mohamed Elyounoussi	2014–2016	30
Jan Berg	1982–1995	29
Rune Ulvestad	1978–1986	29
Petter Belsvik	1989–1991	28
Etzaz Hussain	2012–2022	28
Stein Olav Hestad	1971–1989	27
Mattias Moström	2007–2020	27
Arild Stavrum	1994–2004	27
Jostein Flo	1987–1990	26
Kjetil Rekdal	1985–1988	25
Mame Biram Diouf	2007–2009	23
Eirik Hestad	2013–2021	23
Björn Bergmann Sigurðarson	2014–2022	23
Davy Claude Angan	2011–2012	22
Ola Brynhildsen	2020–present	21
José Mota	2008–2011	20
Fredrik Gulbrandsen	2013–2016	19
André Schei Lindbæk	1999–2002	19
Karl Oskar Fjørtoft	1997–2002	18
Harry Hestad	1962–1980	18
Fredrik Aursnes	2016–2021	17
Jo Inge Berget	2011–2013	17
Thomas Mork	1997–2008	17
Sander Svendsen	2013–2017	17
Baye Djiby Fall	2010	16
David Datro Fofana	2021–2022	15
Tommy Høiland	2013–2015	15
Martin Linnes	2012–present	15
Odd Ivar Moen	1974–1986	15
Petter Rudi	1991–2006	15
Odd Berg	1967–1976	14
Rob Friend	2004–2006	14
Erling Haaland	2017–2018	14
Ola Kamara	2015	14
Jo Tessem	1998–1999	14
Knut Anders Fostervold	1995–2002	13
Eirik Ulland Andersen	2019–present	12
Torkild Brakstad	1963–1978	12
Martin Ellingsen	2017–present	12
Anders Hasselgård	1997–2004	12
Kristoffer Haugen	2018–present	12
Fredrik Brustad	2016–2018	11
Vegard Forren	2007–2019	11
Einar Sekkesæter	1970–1983	11
Ole Erik Stavrum	1986–1997	11
Stian Ohr	1996–2006	10
Makhtar Thioune	2009–2011	10

Last updated: 13 November 2022

== Cup champions 1994 ==
The following players won the Norwegian Cup in 1994, when Molde won their first trophy after a 3–2 victory against Lyn in the final:

Morten Bakke, Trond Strande, Sindre Rekdal, Flaco, Knut Anders Fostervold, Ulrich Møller, Tarje Nordstrand Jacobsen, André Nevstad, Kjetil Rekdal, Daniel Berg Hestad, Tor Gunnar Johnsen, Ole Bjørn Sundgot, Arild Stavrum, Berdon Sønderland, Jan Berg, Petter Rudi.

== Cup champions 2005 ==
The following players won the Norwegian Cup in 2005, when Molde won their second trophy after Lillestrøm was beaten 4–2 (a.e.t) in the final:

Marcus Andreasson, John Andreas Husøy, Matej Mavric, Rob Friend, Tommy Eide Møster, Toni Kallio, Knut Dørum Lillebakk, Stian Ohr, Magnus Kihlberg, Kai Røberg, Trond Strande, Mitja Brulc, Øyvind Gjerde, Daniel Berg Hestad, Thomas Mork, Petter Rudi, Dag Roar Ørsal, Øyvind Gram, Torgeir Hoås, Martin Høyem, Lars Ivar Moldskred, Erlend Ormbostad, Madiou Konate, Johan Nås, Torgeir Ruud Ramsli, Petter Christian Singsaas.

== League champions 2011 ==
The following players became league champions, when Molde won their first league title in 2011:

Davy Claude Angan, Jo Inge Berget, Daniel Chima, Vini Dantas, Pape Paté Diouf, Magnus Wolff Eikrem, Vegard Forren, Joshua Gatt, Daniel Berg Hestad, Thomas Holm, Magne Hoseth, Emil Johansson, Mattias Moström, José Mota, Espen Bugge Pettersen, Knut Olav Rindarøy, Magne Simonsen, Magnus Stamnestrø, Christian Steen, Makhtar Thioune, Zlatko Tripić, Pål Erik Ulvestad, Kristoffer Paulsen Vatshaug, Krister Wemberg

== League champions 2012 ==
The following players became league champions, when Molde won their second league title in 2012:

Davy Claude Angan, Jo Inge Berget, Abdou Karim Camara, Daniel Chima, Pape Paté Diouf, Magnus Wolff Eikrem, Emmanuel Ekpo, Vegard Forren, Joshua Gatt, Daniel Berg Hestad, Even Hovland, Magne Hoseth, Etzaz Hussain, Martin Linnes, Mattias Moström, Espen Bugge Pettersen, Knut Olav Rindarøy, Magne Simonsen, Magnus Stamnestrø, Børre Steenslid, Ole Söderberg, Zlatko Tripić, Kristoffer Paulsen Vatshaug

== Cup champions 2013 ==
The following players won the Norwegian Cup in 2013, when Molde won their third cup trophy after a 4–2 victory against Rosenborg BK in the final:

Ørjan Nyland, Martin Linnes, Etzaz Hussain, Daniel Chima Chukwu, Even Hovland, Emmanuel Ekpo, Zlatko Tripić, Jo Inge Berget, Agnaldo Pinto de Moraes Júnior, Mattias Moström, Daniel Berg Hestad, Magne Simonsen, Magne Hoseth, Magnar Ødegaard, Knut Olav Rindarøy, Vegard Forren, Fredrik Gulbrandsen, Mats Møller Dæhli, Joona Toivio, Aliou Coly, Lauri Dalla Valle, Tommy Høiland, Eirik Hestad, Per Egil Flo, Børre Steenslid, Victor Johansen, Ole Söderberg, Magnus Wolff Eikrem, Joshua Gatt, Ivar Erlien Furu, Andreas Hollingen, Sander Svendsen

== League champions 2014 ==
The following players became league champions, when Molde won their third league title in 2014:

Ørjan Nyland, Even Hovland, Martin Linnes, Per Egil Flo, Vegard Forren, Daniel Berg Hestad, Harmeet Singh, Mattias Moström, Mohamed Elyounoussi, Björn Bergmann Sigurdarson, Fredrik Gulbrandsen, Daniel Chima Chukwu, Tommy Høiland, Magne Hoseth, Pape Pate Diouf, Joona Toivio, Agnaldo Pinto de Moraes Júnior, Sander Svendsen, Knut Olav Rindarøy, Etzaz Hussain, Ruben Gabrielsen, Eirik Hestad, Magne Simonsen, Espen Bugge Pettersen

== Cup champions 2014 ==
The following players won the Norwegian Cup in 2014, when Molde won their fourth cup trophy after a 2–0 victory against Odds BK in the final, and won the double for the first time in club history:

Ørjan Nyland, Joona Toivio, Martin Linnes, Per-Egil Flo, Vegard Forren, Harmeet Singh, Mattias Mostrøm, Etzaz Hussain, Mohamed Elyounoussi, Fredrik Gulbrandsen, Daniel Chima Chukwu, Espen Bugge Pettersen, Lunan Ruben Gabrielsen, Daniel Berg Hestad, Björn Bergmann Sigurdarson, Tommy Høiland, Knut Olav Rindarøy, Sander Svendsen, Ethan Horvath, Magne Simonsen, Emmanuel Ekpo, Agnaldo Pinto de Moraes Júnior, Pape Pate Diouf, Andreas Hollingen, Eirik Haugan, Ole Martin Rindarøy, Eirik Hestad, Magne Hoseth

== League champions 2019 ==
The following players became league champions (minimum three appearances), when Molde won their fourth league title in 2019:

Eirik Ulland Andersen, Fredrik Aursnes, Martin Bjørnbak, Mathis Bolly, Tobias Christensen, Álex Craninx, Magnus Wolff Eikrem, Martin Ellingsen, Vegard Forren, Ruben Gabrielsen, Kristoffer Haraldseid, Kristoffer Haugen, Eirik Hestad, Etzaz Hussain, Leke James, Erling Knudtzon, Andreas Linde, Mattias Moström, Ohi Omoijuanfo, Christoffer Remmer, Fredrik Sjølstad, Henry Wingo

== Cup champions 2021/22 ==
The following players won the Norwegian Cup in 2021/22, when Molde won their fifth cup trophy after a 1–0 victory against FK Bodø/Glimt in the final:

Eirik Ulland Andersen, Fredrik Aursnes, Martin Bjørnbak, Mathis Bolly, Emil Breivik, Ola Brynhildsen, Magnus Wolff Eikrem, Datro Fofana, Magnus Grødem, Benjamin Hansen, Eirik Haugan, Kristoffer Haugen, Eirik Hestad, Etzaz Hussain, Markus André Kaasa, Jacob Karlstrøm, Erling Knudtzon, Martin Linnes, Mathias Løvik, Sivert Mannsverk, Birk Risa, Sheriff Sinyan, Rafik Zekhnini, Niklas Ødegård

== League champions 2022 ==
The following players became league champions (minimum seven appearances), when Molde won their fifth league title in 2022:

Johan Bakke, Martin Bjørnbak, Mathis Bolly, Emil Breivik, Ola Brynhildsen, Magnus Wolff Eikrem, Kristian Eriksen, Datro Fofana, Magnus Grødem, Benjamin Hansen, Eirik Haugan, Kristoffer Haugen, Etzaz Hussain, Markus André Kaasa, Jacob Karlstrøm, Erling Knudtzon, Martin Linnes, Mathias Løvik, Sivert Mannsverk, Birk Risa, Rafik Zekhnini, Niklas Ødegård

== Norway international players ==
The following players have represented Norway, while playing for Molde.

- (Norway) Trond Andersen
- (Norway) Morten Bakke
- (Norway) Jan Berg
- (Norway) Jo Inge Berget
- (Norway) Torkild Brakstad
- (Norway) Ola Brynhildsen
- (Norway) Mats Møller Dæhli
- (Norway) Magnus Wolff Eikrem
- (Norway) Mohamed Elyounoussi
- (Norway) Jostein Flo
- (Norway) Per-Egil Flo
- (Norway) Vegard Forren
- (Norway) Jan Fuglset
- (Norway) Fredrik Gulbrandsen
- (Norway) Hugo Hansen
- (Norway) Åge Hareide
- (Norway) Daniel Berg Hestad
- (Norway) Harry Hestad
- (Norway) Magne Hoseth
- (Norway) Even Hovland
- (Norway) Arne Legernes
- (Norway) Øyvind Leonhardsen
- (Norway) Martin Linnes
- (Norway) Andreas Lund
- (Norway) Ulrich Møller
- (Norway) Roger Nilsen
- (Norway) Ørjan Nyland
- (Norway) Stian Ohr
- (Norway) Odd Inge Olsen
- (Norway) Espen Bugge Pettersen
- (Norway) Kjetil Rekdal
- (Norway) Knut Olav Rindarøy
- (Norway) Petter Rudi
- (Norway) Harmeet Singh
- (Norway) Ole Gunnar Solskjær
- (Norway) Arild Stavrum
- (Norway) Ole Bjørn Sundgot
