= List of Molde FK players (1–24 appearances) =

Molde Fotballklubb is a Norwegian association football club based in Molde, Norway. The club was formed in 1911 as International. The club was renamed Molde FK in 1915. Molde had several grounds as their home ground until they in 1955 began to permanently use Molde Stadion as their home ground. In 1998, they moved to their current home ground, Aker Stadion.

Since Molde's first competitive match, a number of players have made a competitive first-team appearance for the club. Many of these players have spent only a short period of their career at Molde FK before seeking opportunities in other teams; some players had their careers cut short by injury, while others left for other reasons.

== Players ==
- Appearances and goals are for first-team competitive matches only, including Eliteserien, 1. divisjon, Norwegian Cup, Eliteserien play-offs, Champions League, UEFA Cup/Europa League and Cup Winners' Cup.
- Players are listed according to the date of their first-team debut for the club.

This list is under construction. Statistics correct as of match played 14 December 2023

Table headers

- Nationality – If a player played international football, the country/countries he played for are shown. Otherwise, the player's nationality is given as their country of birth.
- Molde career – The year of the player's first appearance for Molde FK to the year of his last appearance.
- Total – The total number of matches played, both as a starter and as a substitute.

Positions key
GK	Goalkeeper
DF	Defender
MF	Midfielder
FW	Forward
U	Utility player^{1}

List of Molde FK players with fewer than 25 appearances
Name	Nationality	Position	Molde career	Debut	Apps.	Goals	Ref
Lasse Møller	Norway	DF	1987	16 May 1987	3	0	
Even Blakstad	Norway	DF	1987	8 August 1987	1	0	
Stig Engen	Norway	GK	1988–1989	18 May 1988	4	0	
Espen Søraa	Norway	MF	1989	30 April 1989	4	0	
Frode Tømmerbakk	Norway	FW	1989–1992	30 April 1989	13	0	
Kjell Rune Flo	Norway	DF	1990	29 April 1990	17	4	
Stein Holsvik	Norway	FW	1991	12 May 1991	7	4	
Adrian Pennock	England	DF	1991	29 May 1991	18	2	
Per Arne Gjerdalen	Norway		1991	22 September 1991	2	0	
Paul Moulden	England	FW	1992	24 May 1992	6	2	
Jan Richard Johnsen	Norway	MF	1992	6 June 1992	1	0	
Roger Svendsen	Norway	DF	1992–1993	24 June 1992	3	0	
Kjell Gunnar Ildhusøy	Norway	FW	1992–1993	18 October 1992	5	1	
Stig Hasselvold	Norway	MF	1993	2 May 1993	9	0	
Hans Ivar Klefstad	Norway	FW	1993–1994	23 May 1993	9	2	
Sindre Eid	Norway	DF	1993	26 May 1993	1	0	
Steve Kinsey	England	FW	1993	22 August 1993	4	1	
Tor Gunnar Johnsen	Norway	FW	1994–1995	1 May 1994	24	2	
Frode Kvalshaug	Norway		1994	4 May 1994	5	0	
Tom-Eskil Grande	Norway	FW	1994	7 August 1994	2	0	
Robert Pettersen	Norway		1994	7 August 1994	1	0	
Bjarte Skuseth	Norway	DF	1995–1996	22 April 1995	18	0	
Odd Petter Lyngstad	Norway	DF	1995	10 September 1995	8	0	
Per Olav Sætre	Norway	DF	1995–1997	10 September 1995	9	0	
Pedersen	Norway	DF	1996–1997	13 April 1996	30	1	
Are Lervik	Norway	GK	1996–1999	30 April 1996	4	0	
Lee Robertson	Scotland	MF	1997	20 April 1997	4	0	
Bjarki Gunnlaugsson	Iceland	MF	1997–1998	6 July 1997	19	7	
Ståle Rønningen	Norway	DF	1998–2000	10 May 1998	2	0	
Jarkko Wiss	Finland	MF	1999	23 April 1999	4	1	
Svein Tore Brandshaug	Norway	MF	1999–2002	20 June 1999	5	0	
Torgeir Ruud Ramsli	Norway	DF	1999–2005	15 August 1999	16	0	
Clayton Zane	Australia	FW	2000	9 April 2000	14	0	
Tor Einar Leira	Norway	MF	2000	27 August 2000	1	0	
Nils Gunnar Thomle	Norway	FW	2001	29 April 2001	1	0	
Ardian Gashi	Norway	MF	2001	6 May 2001	6	1	
Jákup Mikkelsen	Faroe Islands	GK	2001–2002	22 July 2001	12	0	
Ante Juric	Australia	MF	2001	12 August 2001	3	0	
Andri Sigþórsson	Iceland	DF	2001–2003	9 September 2001	17	7	
Anders Særvold	Norway	DF	2003	2 June 2003	1	0	
Martin Høyem	Norway	DF	2003–2005	14 August 2003	24	0	
Joar Harøy	Norway	DF	2004	25 July 2004	1	0	
Peter Berg Hestad	Norway	MF	2004–2007	25 July 2004	24	0	
Lars Ivar Moldskred	Norway	GK	2004–2007	25 July 2004	24	0	
Mitja Brulc	Slovenia	MF	2004–2005	23 August 2004	9	1	
Dag Roar Ørsal	Norway	MF	2005	11 May 2005	18	3	
Øyvind Gram	Norway	MF	2005–2006	11 May 2005	10	2	
Johan Nås	Norway	FW	2005	26 June 2005	2	0	
Marcus Bakke	Norway	MF	2005–2006	9 April 2006	9	0	
Denni Conteh	Denmark	FW	2006	9 April 2006	6	2	
Sandro Grande	Canada	MF	2006	17 April 2006	18	0	
Christian Gauseth	Norway	MF	2007	9 April 2007	24	2	
Fredrik Samdal Solberg	Norway	DF	2007	22 April 2007	2	0	
Vidar G. Henriksen	Norway	DF	2007	20 June 2007	6	0	
Selemani Ndikumana	Burundi	FW	2008	23 July 2008	2	0	
Souhaieb El Amari	Tunisia	MF	2008	29 September 2008	1	0	
Brian Waltrip	USA	U	2009–2010	10 May 2009	14	1	
Kristian Strandhagen	Norway	MF	2009–2010	10 May 2009	7	0	
Jacob Falch Meidell	Norway	DF	2009–2010	1 August 2009	3	0	
Elias Valderhaug	Norway	GK	2009–2011	9 August 2009	7	0	
Björn Runström	Sweden	FW	2010	14 March 2010	21	3	
Ben Amos	England	GK	2010	14 March 2010	9	0	
Simon Markeng	Norway	FW	2010	12 April 2010	3	0	
Pål Erik Ulvestad	Norway	U	2011	17 April 2011	16	0	
Sean Cunningham	USA	DF	2011	1 May 2011	3	0	
Ivar Furu	Norway	DF	2011–2013	1 May 2011	4	0	
Krister Wemberg	Norway	DF	2011	1 May 2011	6	0	
Ole Martin Rindarøy	Norway	DF	2011–2017	25 May 2011	15	0	
Vini Dantas	Brazil	FW	2011–2012	17 September 2011	9	2	
Abdou Karim Camara	Senegal	MF	2011–2012	27 November 2011	12	0	
Victor Johansen	Norway	DF	2012–2013	1 May 2012	4	0	
Ole Söderberg	Sweden	GK	2012–2013	1 May 2012	23	0	
Børre Steenslid	Norway	DF	2012–2013	4 August 2012	12	0	
Magnar Ødegaard	Norway	DF	2012–2013	7 October 2012	13	0	
Andreas Hollingen	Norway	MF	2012–2014	25 October 2012	5	1	
Lauri Dalla Valle	Finland	FW	2013	15 March 2013	6	0	
Aliou Coly	Senegal	U	2013	17 April 2013	14	5	
Ben Spencer	USA	FW	2013	1 September 2013	2	0	
Amidou Diop	Senegal	MF	2014–2017	2 November 2014	13	0	
Thomas Kind Bendiksen	Norway	MF	2015	11 April 2015	11	1	
Martin Ove Roseth	Norway	DF	2015–19	22 April 2015	4	0	
Fredrik Semb Berge	Norway	DF	2015	7 May 2015	12	1	
Erlend Hustad	Norway	FW	2015	7 May 2015	1	0	
Mushaga Bakenga	Norway	FW	2015–2016	23 September 2015	10	4	
Neydson da Silva	Brazil	GK	2015–2017	8 November 2015	2	0	
Kristian Strande	Norway	DF	2016	25 February 2016	3	0	
Eiður Guðjohnsen	Iceland	FW	2016	13 March 2016	13	1	
Thompson Ekpe	Nigeria	MF	2016	13 April 2016	3	0	
Dulee Johnson	Sweden	MF	2016	13 April 2016	1	0	
Tobias Svendsen	Norway	MF	2016-18	13 April 2016	23	2	
Óttar Magnús Karlsson	Iceland	FW	2017	1 April 2017	10	2	
Leo Skiri Østigård	Norway	DF	2017	4 June 2017	1	0	
Mathias Eriksen Ranmark	Norway	GK	2017–18	12 August 2017	3	0	
Ibrahima Wadji	Senegal	FW	2017–2018	20 August 2017	17	5	
Mathias Normann	Norway	MF	2017–2018	27 August 2017	18	1	
Christopher Telo	Sweden	DF	2017–2019	17 September 2017	10	0	
Sivert Gussiås	Norway	FW	2018	18 April 2018	1	0	
Simen Hagbø	Norway	DF	2018	18 April 2018	1	0	
Paweł Cibicki	Sweden	FW	2018	26 July 2018	18	3	
Jakob Nyland Ørsahl	Norway	MF	2019	23 May 2019	1	2	
Tobias Hestad	Norway	MF	2019	23 May 2019	1	0	
Markus Eiane	Norway	FW	2019	23 May 2019	1	0	
Oliver Petersen	Norway	GK	2019–	23 May 2019	32	0	
John Kitolano	Norway	DF	2020	28 June 2020	10	1	
Ole Sebastian Sundgot	Norway	FW	2020	19 December 2020	1	0	
Albert Tjåland	Norway	FW	2021-	25 July 2021	1	1	
Anders Børset	Norway	MF	2021-2023	25 July 2021	4	0	
Gustav Nyheim	Norway	FW	2021-	25 July 2021	8	0	
Adrian Ugelvik	Philippines	DF	2021	25 July 2021	1	0	
Johan Bakke	Norway	MF	2022-	18 May 2022	10	0	
Leon Hovland	Norway	MF	2022-	18 May 2022	1	0	
Martin Kjørsvik	Norway	FW	2022	18 May 2022	1	0	
Andreas Myklebust	Norway	MF	2022-	18 May 2022	1	0	
Christian Cappis	USA	DF	2023	1 October 2023	4	0	

== Notes ==
- A utility player is one who is considered to play in more than one position.
