= 2005 Norwegian Football Cup final =

- Event: 2005 Norwegian Football Cup
Molde	Lillestrøm
4	2
- After extra time
- Date: 6 November 2005
- Venue: Ullevaal Stadion, Oslo
- Referee: Brage Sandmoen
- Attendance: 25,182

The 2005 Norwegian Football Cup final was the final match of the 2005 Norwegian Football Cup, the 100th season of the Norwegian Football Cup, the premier Norwegian football cup competition organized by the Football Association of Norway (NFF). The match was played on 9 November 2003 at the Ullevaal Stadion in Oslo, and opposed two Tippeligaen sides Molde and Lillestrøm. Molde defeated Lillestrøm 4–2 after extra time to claim the Norwegian Cup for a ninth time in their history.

== Route to the final ==
Molde			Round	Lillestrøm		
Dahle	A	8–0	Round 1	Sander	A	1–0
Kolstad	A	2–1	Round 2	Strømmen	A	3–1
Nybergsund	H	3–2	Round 3	Moss	H	5–3 aet
Bodø/Glimt	A	2–1	Round 4	Viking	A	2–0
Odd Grenland	H	3–0	Quarterfinal	Stabæk	H	3–1
Hønefoss	H	1–0	Semifinal	Vålerenga	H	2–0

== Match ==
=== Details ===
6 November 2005
13:15 CET (UTC+1)

Molde	4–2 (a.e.t.)	Lillestrøm
Friend 25'; Konate 65'; Berg Hestad 94'; Husøy 108'	Report	Mouelhi 46'; Sundgot 90' (pen.)

Ullevaal Stadion, Oslo
Attendance: 25,182
Referee: Brage Sandmoen (Kjelsås)

Molde	Lillestrøm

Molde:
GK	1	(Norway) Knut Dørum Lillebakk
DF	17	(Norway) Trond Strande		(substituted off) 85'
DF	3	(Sweden) Marcus Andreasson
DF	33	(Norway) Petter Christian Singsaas
DF	5	(Norway) Øyvind Gjerde		(substituted off) 70'
MF	10	(Norway) Stian Ohr
MF	11	(Sweden) Magnus Kihlberg	(yellow card) 89'
MF	15	(Norway) Petter Rudi
MF	6	(Norway) Daniel Berg Hestad (c)
FW	26	(Senegal) Madiou Konate		(substituted off) 81'
FW	9	(Canada) Rob Friend
Substitutions:
GK	12	(Norway) Lars Ivar Moldskred
DF	4	(Finland) Toni Kallio		(substituted on) 70'
MF	7	(Norway) Thomas Mork
MF	8	(Norway) Dag Roar Ørsal
MF	14	(Norway) John Andreas Husøy		(substituted on) 81'
MF	18	(Norway) Tommy Eide Møster
DF	24	(Slovenia) Matej Mavrič		(substituted on) 85'
Coach:
(Sweden) Bo Johansson

Lillestrøm:
GK	42	(Germany) Claus Reitmaier
DF	5	(Sweden) Christoffer Andersson	(substituted off) 86'
DF	23	(Norway) Pål Steffen Andresen
DF	13	(Norway) Frode Kippe (c)
DF	6	(Norway) Pål Strand
MF	12	(Norway) Bjørn Helge Riise
MF	7	(Norway) Espen Søgård	(substituted off) 70'
MF	25	(Tunisia) Khaled Mouelhi
MF	10	(Slovenia) Robert Koren
FW	11	(Sweden) Magnus Powell	(substituted off) 109'
FW	18	(Norway) Arild Sundgot
Substitutions:
GK	1	(Germany) Heinz Müller
DF	2	(Norway) Anders Rambekk	(substituted on) 86'
DF	3	(Australia) Shane Stefanutto
DF	9	(Norway) Johan-Petter Winsnes
FW	11	(Norway) Magnus Myklebust	(substituted on) 109'
MF	14	(Australia) Sasa Radulovic
FW	19	(Sweden) Andreas Haddad	(substituted on) 70'
Coach:
(Germany) Uwe Rösler
