= Moldskred =

Moldskred is a Norwegian surname that may refer to the following notable people:

- Lars Ivar Moldskred (born 1978), Norwegian football goalkeeper
- Matias Belli Moldskred (born 1997), Norwegian-Spanish football midfielder
- Morten Moldskred (born 1980), Norwegian football winger
