= 2004 Norwegian Second Division =

Norwegian football league season

The 2004 2. divisjon season was the third highest football (soccer) league for men in Norway.

26 games were played in 4 groups, with 3 points given for wins and 1 for draws. Tønsberg, Follo, Løv-Ham and Alta were promoted to the First Division. Number twelve, thirteen and fourteen were relegated to the 3. divisjon. The winning teams from each of the 24 groups in the 3. divisjon each faced a winning team from another group in a playoff match, resulting in 12 playoff winners which were promoted to the 2. divisjon.

== League tables ==
=== Group 1 ===
Pos	Team	Pld	W	D	L	GF	GA	GD	Pts	Promotion or relegation
1	FK Tønsberg (P)	26	20	2	4	70	21	+49	62	Promotion to First Division
2	Sarpsborg Sparta	26	16	4	6	63	38	+25	52	
3	Tollnes	26	16	2	8	68	42	+26	50	
4	Kvik Halden	26	12	8	6	70	40	+30	44	
5	Stabæk 2 (Note: Stabæk 2 was forcibly relegated because its A team was relegated to the First Division.) (R)	26	12	2	12	54	59	−5	38	Relegation to Third Division
6	Ørn-Horten	26	11	4	11	52	65	−13	37	
7	Frigg	26	10	6	10	50	34	+16	36	
8	Larvik Fotball	26	10	5	11	31	37	−6	35	
9	Kjelsås	26	9	7	10	38	39	−1	34	
10	Odd Grenland 2	26	9	5	12	48	49	−1	32	
11	Sprint-Jeløy	26	8	5	13	52	68	−16	29	
12	Mercantile (Note: Mercantile survived as the best number-12-team.)	26	7	7	12	36	55	−19	28	
13	Arendal (R)	26	6	3	17	31	67	−36	21	Relegation to Third Division
14	Donn (R)	26	3	6	17	29	78	−49	15	Relegation to Third Division

(P) Promoted; (R) Relegated

=== Group 2 ===
Pos	Team	Pld	W	D	L	GF	GA	GD	Pts	Promotion or relegation
1	Follo (P)	26	16	6	4	57	22	+35	54	Promotion to First Division
2	Lørenskog	26	13	9	4	66	40	+26	48	
3	Lillestrøm 2	26	13	8	5	72	37	+35	47	
4	Ullensaker/Kisa	26	14	3	9	56	48	+8	45	
5	Gjøvik-Lyn	26	11	8	7	55	40	+15	41	
6	Nybergsund	26	10	9	7	43	35	+8	39	
7	Oslo Øst	26	10	4	12	45	48	−3	34	
8	Drøbak/Frogn	26	7	12	7	48	44	+4	33	
9	Jotun Årdalstangen	26	9	6	11	45	49	−4	33	
10	Eidsvold Turn	26	9	5	12	38	53	−15	32	
11	Molde 2	26	6	11	9	52	60	−8	29	
12	Nidelv (R)	26	7	6	13	45	71	−26	27	Relegation to Third Division
13	Elverum (R)	26	3	8	15	27	74	−47	17	Relegation to Third Division
14	Skjetten (R)	26	3	7	16	37	65	−28	16	Relegation to Third Division

(P) Promoted; (R) Relegated

=== Group 3 ===
Pos	Team	Pld	W	D	L	GF	GA	GD	Pts	Promotion or relegation
1	Løv-Ham (P)	26	22	3	1	86	27	+59	69	Promotion to First Division
2	Bærum	26	17	2	7	75	31	+44	53	
3	Åsane	26	13	3	10	52	37	+15	42	
4	Viking 2	26	12	4	10	43	37	+6	40	
5	Fyllingen	26	12	2	12	56	59	−3	38	
6	Fana	26	10	8	8	48	57	−9	38	
7	Klepp	26	10	6	10	43	49	−6	36	
8	Sandnes Ulf	26	10	4	12	38	47	−9	34	
9	Hovding	26	10	3	13	46	54	−8	33	
10	Ålgård	26	9	3	14	37	57	−20	30	
11	Brann 2	26	7	8	11	52	69	−17	29	
12	Vidar (R)	26	7	6	13	35	51	−16	27	Relegation to Third Division
13	Volda (R)	26	8	1	17	39	59	−20	25	Relegation to Third Division
14	Norheimsund (R)	26	6	5	15	34	50	−16	23	Relegation to Third Division

(P) Promoted; (R) Relegated

=== Group 4 ===
Pos	Team	Pld	W	D	L	GF	GA	GD	Pts	Promotion or relegation
1	Alta (P)	26	21	0	5	95	21	+74	63	Promotion to First Division
2	Levanger	26	17	6	3	89	34	+55	57	
3	Strindheim	26	18	3	5	98	45	+53	57	
4	Mo	26	15	5	6	51	30	+21	50	
5	Byåsen	26	12	4	10	48	45	+3	40	
6	Harstad	26	12	3	11	66	62	+4	39	
7	Skarp	26	11	3	12	44	40	+4	36	
8	Steinkjer	26	10	4	12	65	52	+13	34	
9	Kolstad	26	10	3	13	51	59	−8	33	
10	Lofoten	26	10	2	14	50	66	−16	32	
11	Rosenborg 2	26	9	3	14	44	61	−17	30	
12	Vesterålen (R)	26	5	5	16	32	74	−42	20	Relegation to Third Division
13	Salangen (R)	26	5	4	17	45	110	−65	19	Relegation to Third Division
14	Narvik (R)	26	2	5	19	27	106	−79	11	Relegation to Third Division

(P) Promoted; (R) Relegated

== Top goalscorers ==
- 34 goals:
  - (Sweden) Simon Sjöfors, Kvik Halden
- 32 goals:
  - (Norway) Vegard Alstad Sunde, Levanger
- 24 goals:
  - (Norway) Johan Nås, Lørenskog
- 23 goals:
  - (Norway) Armin Sistek, Odd Grenland 2
  - (Norway) Jørn Holmen, Steinkjer
  - (Norway) Jørn Hansen, Alta
  - (Norway) Kim Nysted, Bærum
- 21 goals:
  - (Norway) Lars Petter Hansen, Tønsberg
- 20 goals:
  - (Norway) Ørjan Låstad, Åsane
  - (Norway) Vegard Olsen, Strindheim
- 19 goals:
  - (Norway) Morten Romsdalen, Tollnes
  - (Norway) Oddmund Vaagsholm, Follo
