= Stian Ohr =

Norwegian footballer (born 1978)

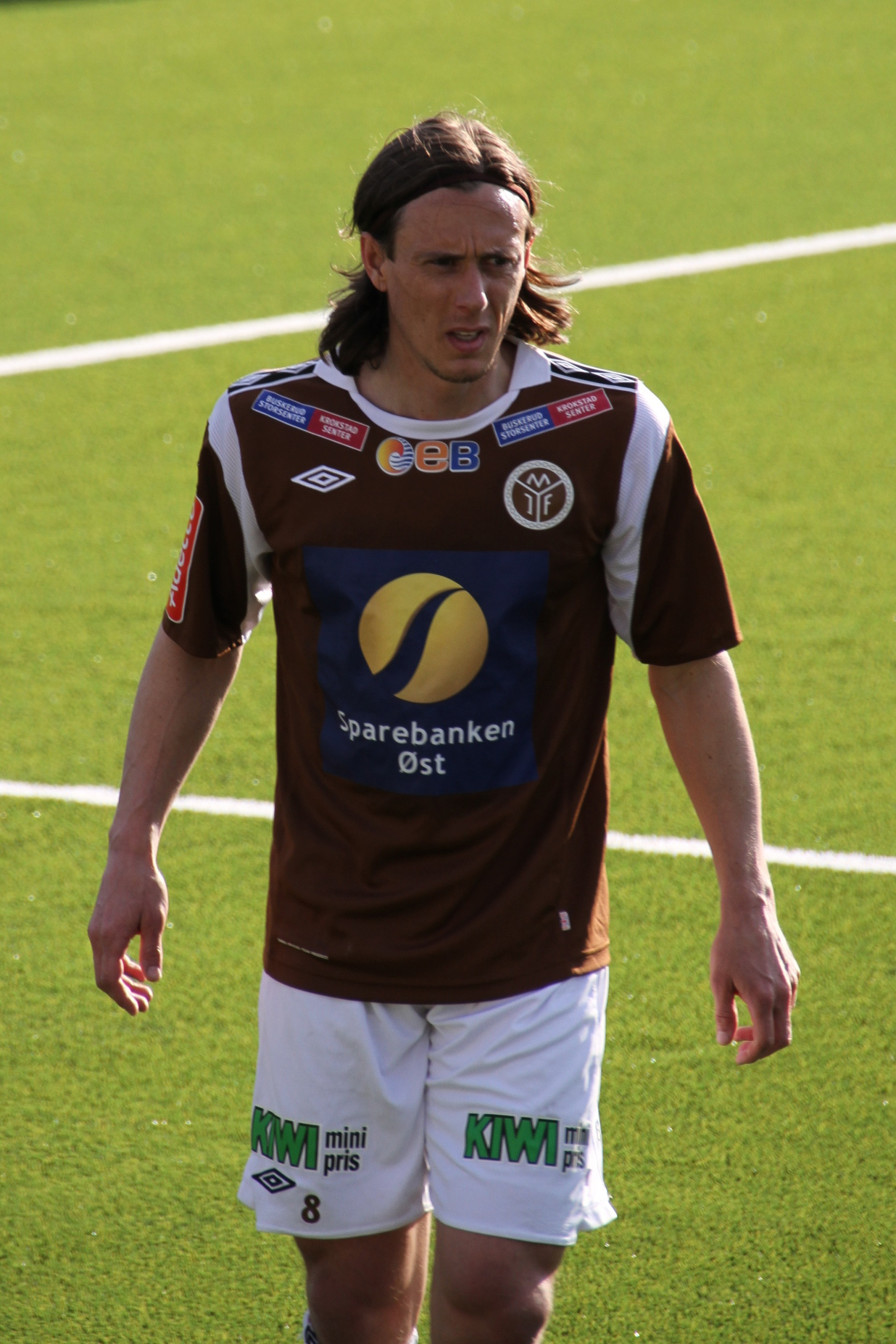
- Ohr playing for Mjøndalen in 2012

Personal information
- Full name: Stian Piene Ohr
- Date of birth: 4 January 1978 (age 48)
- Place of birth: Bergen, Norway
- Height: 1.72 m (5 ft 7 1/2 in)
- Position: Midfielder

Senior career*
Years	Team	Apps	(Gls)
1996–1999	Molde	18	(2)
1999	→ Hødd (loan)	17	(2)
2000–2001	Start	53	(14)
2002–2003	Vålerenga	41	(2)
2003–2004	Stabæk	31	(3)
2005–2006	Molde	51	(8)
2007–2009	Strømsgodset	76	(6)
2010–2013	Mjøndalen	59	(2)

International career
2006	Norway	1	(0)
- * Club domestic league appearances and goals

Stian Ohr (born 4 January 1978) is a former Norwegian footballer who played as a midfielder for several clubs in Tippeligaen. He was also capped once for Norway in 2006. While playing for Molde, Start, Vålerenga, Stabæk and Strømsgodset, he played a total of 239 matches and scored 27 goals in Tippeligaen. He also spent time on loan with Hødd and ended his career with the First Division side Mjøndalen.

== Club career ==
Ohr was born in Bergen, where he lived the first couple of years before he moved to Molde. Having grown up in Molde, Ohr started his career in the local club Molde FK and made his debut in Tippeligaen when he replaced Ole Bjørn Sundgot in the match against Kongsvinger on 17 August 1996. He also won the Norwegian Youth Cup with Molde in 1996 and 1997.

Ohr made his break-through ahead of the 1997 season, at same time as the other local youngsters, Thomas Mork and Anders Hasselgård, and the trio got the nickname kyllingrekka. Ohr didn't play much for Molde in the 1999 season, and spent most of the season with Hødd which was relegated from the First Division. After the season, Molde decided to terminate Ohr's contract. He subsequently joined Start in 2000, and was a part of the team that was relegated from Tippeligaen. Ohr scored 14 goals in 53 matches for Start between 2000 and 2001, before he was sold to Vålerenga. In his first season with the club, he became Norwegian Champion after they won the 2002 Norwegian Football Cup. In mid-2003, Ohr transferred to Stabæk and played for the team until they were relegated from Tippeligaen in 2004.

Ohr returned to Molde ahead of the 2005 season, and scored two goals 2–1 win against Odd Grenland in the quarter-final of the 2005 Norwegian Football Cup and was a part of the team that won the final against Lillestrøm. When the club was relegated from the 2006 Tippeligaen, it became Ohr's fourth relegated in seven years. Opposed to other local players, Ohr left Molde after the relegation, and joined Strømsgodset ahead of the 2007 season. He played three seasons for the club, until his contract expired in 2009. Between 2010 and 2013 he played for Mjøndalen.

== International career ==
During his youth, Ohr made 15 appearances without scoring a goal for Norwegian youth national team, from under-15 to under-18 level. Ohr was called up for the Norwegian national team for two friendly matches against Canada and the United States in January 2006. He did not appear in the match against Canada, but started in the 5–0 loss against the United States and was taken off at half time. This was his only appearance for the national team.

== Career statistics ==
Season	Club	Division	League		Cup		Other		Total	
Season	Club	Division	Apps	Goals	Apps	Goals	Apps	Goals	Apps	Goals
1996	Molde	Tippeligaen	5	0	0	0	–		5	0
1997	Molde	Tippeligaen	11	1	0	0	–		11	1
1998	Molde	Tippeligaen	2	1	0	0	–		2	1
Molde Total			18	2	0	0	–		18	2
1999	Hødd	Adeccoligaen	17	2	2	0	–		19	2
Hødd Total			17	2	2	0	–		19	2
2000	Start	Tippeligaen	24	6	3	0	–		27	6
2001	Start	Adeccoligaen	29	8	4	2	–		33	10
Start Total			53	14	7	2	–		60	16
2002	Vålerenga	Tippeligaen	25	2	5	0	–		30	2
2003	Vålerenga	Tippeligaen	16	0	5	2	–		21	2
Vålerenga Total			41	2	10	2	–		51	4
2003	Stabæk	Tippeligaen	7	1	0	0	–		7	1
2004	Stabæk	Tippeligaen	24	2	4	2	1	0	29	4
Stabæk Total			31	3	4	2	1	0	36	5
2005	Molde	Tippeligaen	25	7	5	2	2	0	32	9
2006	Molde	Tippeligaen	26	1	2	1	2	0	30	2
Molde Total			51	8	7	3	4	0	62	11
2007	Strømsgodset	Tippeligaen	25	2	4	1	–		29	3
2008	Strømsgodset	Tippeligaen	26	4	3	1	–		29	5
2009	Strømsgodset	Tippeligaen	25	0	2	0	–		27	0
Strømsgodset Total			76	6	9	2	–		85	8
2010	Mjøndalen	Adeccoligaen	6	0	1	0	–		7	0
2011	Mjøndalen	Adeccoligaen	21	1	2	1	–		23	2
2012	Mjøndalen	Adeccoligaen	28	1	3	0	1	0	32	1
2013	Mjøndalen	Adeccoligaen	10	0	2	0	0	0	12	2
Mjøndalen Total			59	2	7	1	1	0	67	3
Career Total			346	40	46	12	6	0	398	51
