= Norman Sheldon =

Canadian soccer player

Personal information
- National team: Canada
- Born: Glasgow, Scotland
- Died: Prince Albert, Saskatchewan

Norman Sheldon was a Scottish soccer player and hall of famer who played in Canada in the early half of the 1900s.

== Early life ==
Sheldon was born in Glasgow, Scotland. He immigrated to Canada, more specifically Prince Albert, Saskatchewan, in 1906 after a junior football career in Scotland. It was the community of Prince Albert where Sheldon continued to play until 1929.

== Career ==
Throughout that time period, Sheldon was chosen three times to represent Canada, however, he was only able to play for them once. He was first elected in 1912 for a tour of England. He was the only Saskatchewan soccer player to be selected for Canada. He competed against the Scots in their 1921 tour of Canada. Sheldon would play two games during that tour. He would play on 28 June in Prince Albert, Saskatchewan and on 9 July in Montreal, Quebec.

An indication of Sheldon's ability is that this team was selected by the Scottish team management following their Canadian cross-country tour. In 1924, Sheldon was once again picked to be a part of Team Canada, who were facing off against Australia and New Zealand, but he didn't make the trip.

While playing every season in Saskatchewan, Sheldon played in Vancouver for two winters and each year he was selected as a member of the Vancouver All-Star Team.

Sheldon had a distinguished playing career which spanned 23 years. This is a record which has yet to be equalled in Saskatchewan provincial soccer. On 22 May 1967, Sheldon was inducted into the Saskatchewan Sports Hall of Fame. In 1989, he was inducted into the Prince Albert Sports Hall of Fame.

== Pop culture ==
Sheldon was featured in the book Saskatchewan Soccer People: Martin Nash, Rob Friend, Kevin Holness, Jordan Schidlowsky, Brian Philley, Norman Sheldon, Amy Vermeulen.
