= Kristian Strande =

Norwegian footballer (born 1997)

Personal information
- Full name: Kristian Fredrik Aasen Strande
- Date of birth: 3 October 1997 (age 29)
- Place of birth: Molde, Norway
- Height: 1.85 m (6 ft 1 in)
- Position: Centre-back

Team information
- Current team: Moss
- Number: 3

Youth career
- –201: Molde

Senior career*
Years	Team	Apps	(Gls)
2016–2017	Molde	0	(0)
2017	→ Brattvåg (loan)	10	(1)
2018	Egersund	7	(0)
2019	Brattvåg	22	(1)
2020	Hamkam	12	(0)
2021	Arendal	23	(1)
2022–	Moss	98	(5)
- * Club domestic league appearances and goals as of 10 April 2026

Kristian Strande (born 3 October 1997) is a Norwegian footballer who plays as a centre-back for Moss FK.

== Career ==
He was born in Molde as a son of footballer Trond Strande. As he was brought up in his father's club Molde FK, Kristian Strande trained with Sheffield United U18s in November–December 2015 and Kristiansund BK in January 2016. He was then given a paying contract with Molde, alongside midfielder Ola Husby. He was soon included in the Molde squad that faced Sevilla FC in the 2015–16 UEFA Europa League round of 32. He also played in the 2016 cup, where he was credited with Molde's progress. As team struggled in the second round, Strande was awarded a penalty which was converted by Mohamed Elyounoussi to put Molde through. Strande also won the 2016 Norwegian Youth Cup with Molde.

In 2017, Strande and Ola Husby were loaned out to Brattvåg IL to gain more senior experience and secure promotion from the 2017 3. divisjon. Then, instead of seeing through his contract until the summer of 2018, Strande signed for Egersunds IK ahead of the 2018 2. divisjon season. In the following years, Strande became a bit of a journeyman player with single-season spells in Egersund, Brattvåg, Hamkam and Arendal.

Ahead of the 2022 season, Strande announced his move to Levanger FK. However, he pulled out of the contract, stating that he wished to live closer to his girlfriend in the Oslo region. He also claimed that he had no binding written contract and that no transfer papers were signed. He played friendly matches for Moss FK and eventually joined that club. He stayed for several years and became team captain, winning promotion to the 2023 1. divisjon. In that season, he led the statistic for most yellow cards.
