= Pål Andre Czwartek =

Norwegian footballer (born 1975)

Personal information
- Date of birth: 25 April 1975 (age 51)
- Place of birth: Norway
- Height: 1.81 m (5 ft 11 in)
- Position: Defender

Senior career*
Years	Team	Apps	(Gls)
- Askim
–1995	Sarpsborg		
1996–1997	Moss		
1998–2009	Fredrikstad	244	(2)
- * Club domestic league appearances and goals as of 25 November 2009

Pål Andre Czwartek (born 25 April 1975) is a former Norwegian footballer. He is the only player left in the Fredrikstad squad from the club's time in third tier of the Norwegian league. One of his grandfathers was Polish.

== Career statistics ==
Season	Club	Division	League		Cup		Total	
Season	Club	Division	Apps	Goals	Apps	Goals	Apps	Goals
2003	Fredrikstad	Adeccoligaen	29	0	3	1	32	1
2004	Fredrikstad	Tippeligaen	26	0	3	0	29	0
2005	Fredrikstad	Tippeligaen	12	0	3	0	15	0
2006	Fredrikstad	Tippeligaen	26	0	6	0	32	0
2007	Fredrikstad	Tippeligaen	23	0	1	0	24	0
2008	Fredrikstad	Tippeligaen	18	0	5	0	23	0
2009	Fredrikstad	Tippeligaen	12	1	3	0	15	1
Career Total			146	1	24	1	170	2
