= Herman Ekeberg =

Norwegian footballer (born 1972)

Herman Ekeberg (born 14 March 1972) is a former Norwegian professional football defender playing for Norwegian team Aalesunds FK. After his last active season, 2006, he continued working for the club, focusing on marketing. Herman started his career with Mjøndalen IF.
