= Quique Ortiz =

Argentine footballer

Personal information
- Full name: Enrique Esteban Ortiz Carande
- Date of birth: 16 July 1979 (age 47)
- Place of birth: Córdoba, Argentina
- Position: Wing back

Senior career*
Years	Team	Apps	(Gls)
2001–2005	Instituto de Córdoba	69	(1)
2005–2007	F.C. Lyn Oslo	24	(2)
- * Club domestic league appearances and goals as of 17 May 2008

Enrique "Quique" Ortiz (born 16 July 1979 in Córdoba) is an Argentine footballer who used to play for F.C. Lyn Oslo, in the Norwegian Premier League.

== Career ==
Ortiz spent most of his career at his local club Instituto de Córdoba, before signing for Lyn in the summer of 2005, halfway through the Norwegian season. He made his debut against Molde F.K. on 7 August 2005, and was a regular for the rest of the season.
