= Erlend Holm =

Norwegian footballer (born 1983)

Erlend Holm (born 17 May 1983 in Ålesund) is a Norwegian teacher and former part-time football defender who played for Aalesund until 2008, when he was released after the season. Since then, he decided to retire from football at 25 years old, despite receiving offers from other clubs, to concentrate on his studies.

He has also played for the Norwegian under-21 national team.
