= Brage Sandmoen =

Norwegian football referee (born 1967)

Brage Sandmoen (born 22 March 1967) is a Norwegian football referee. He debuted in the Norwegian Premier League in 2001, He represents Kjelsås IL. Sandmoen refereed the Norwegian cup final in 2005 between Molde and Lillestrøm.

Sandmoen worked as vice-principals in Bredtvet videregående school in Oslo, Norway. When the school in 2008 was declared defunct, he changed employer and worked as teacher in history and social studies at Stabekk videregående school. He currently works as a history teacher and study assistant at Valler Upper Secondary School
