= Toni Kallio =

Finnish footballer and coach (born 1978)

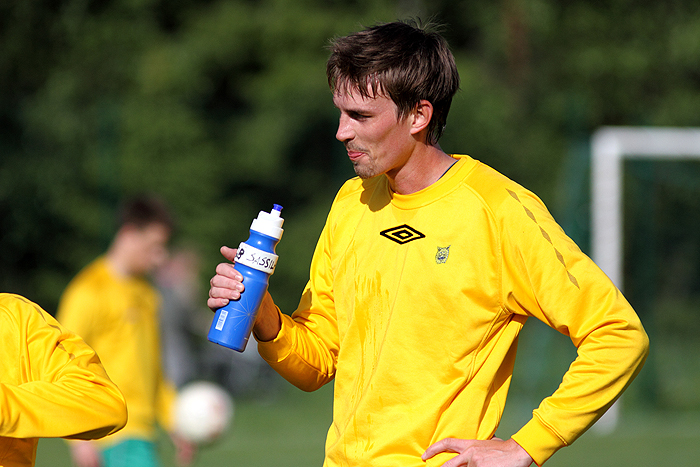

Personal information
- Full name: Toni Kari Mikael Kallio
- Date of birth: 9 August 1978 (age 48)
- Place of birth: Tampere, Finland
- Height: 1.94 m (6 ft 4 in)
- Position: Centre back

Senior career*
Years	Team	Apps	(Gls)
1996–1999	TPV	74	(14)
1997	→ Jazz (loan)	1	(0)
2000–2004	HJK	123	(17)
2004–2007	Molde	53	(6)
2007–2008	BSC Young Boys	21	(2)
2008	→ Fulham (loan)	0	(0)
2008–2010	Fulham	4	(0)
2009–2010	→ Sheffield United (loan)	8	(0)
2010	Viking	1	(0)
2011	Muangthong United	1	(0)
2011	Inter Turku	16	(2)
2012–2013	Ilves	38	(6)
Total		340	(47)

International career
	Finland U19	2	(0)
	Finland U21	5	(1)
2000–2010	Finland	49	(2)

Managerial career
- 2014–2021: Ilves (assistant)
- 2021–2023: Ilves
- * Club domestic league appearances and goals

Toni Kari Mikael Kallio (born 9 August 1978) is a Finnish football coach and a former player. His preferred position as a player was left back, but he also operated as centre back and used to play as forward when he joined HJK. His nickname is "Bonecrusher", coming from his great physical presence and playing style.

== Club career ==
He started out as a winger, but during his time at Norwegian club Molde was changed into a defender. He is known for his forward runs and good heading, given his tall frame. However, he is also known for making occasional blunders in the national team as he has been forced to play out of his preferred position.

Before joining Molde he played for FC Jazz, TPV Tampere and HJK Helsinki in Finland's Veikkausliiga. He won the Norwegian Cup in 2005. In 2007, he briefly went on trial at Lokomotiv Moscow and played 3 times. In 2007, he moved to Young Boys in Switzerland.

On 31 January 2008, Kallio joined Fulham on loan, together with Jari Litmanen. He made his Fulham debut the following season against Arsenal, in which he helped secure a 1–0 victory. He was immediately awarded the Man of the Match award by visitors of the BBC website. On 3 July 2008, Kallio signed a two-year deal with Fulham.

Kallio joined Sheffield United on a one-month loan deal in late November 2009, making his debut just over a week later at Plymouth. After making two appearances, Sheffield United extended his loan deal until the end of January 2010 but just hours after Roy Hodgson recalled Kallio due to injuries in defence.

On 1 February 2010, Kallio once again joined the Blades on loan until the end of the season.

On 1 July 2010, Fulham announced that Kallio had been released from his contract with Fulham.

After being released by Fulham, Kallio joined Norway's Tippeligaen side Viking for the rest of the 2010 season. But after making only one appearance as a substitute for the club, the 32-year-old defender was released from his contract on 16 November 2010.

Kallio signed a contract at the beginning of year 2011 with Thai Premier League side Muangthong United F.C. which won the Premier League title on season 2010.

On 19 May 2011 Muangthong United F.C. has been terminated contract. Kallio joined Finnish Premier League side FC Inter Turku on 8 June 2011.

On 18 January 2012 it was announced that he would join Ilves in Finnish second division.

Kallio announced his retirement on 3 October 2013.

== Coaching career ==
He was promoted to the position of the head coach of Ilves after serving as an assistant during 2014–2021. Late in 2021, his contract was extended for the 2022 and 2023 season, with an option for 2024. He was fired in August 2023.

== Career statistics ==
=== Club ===
As of 27 May 2024

Appearances and goals by club, season and competition
Club	Season	League			National cup (Note: Includes Suomen Cup, Norwegian Cup, Swiss Cup and FA Cup)		Other		Continental		Total	
Club	Season	Division	Apps	Goals	Apps	Goals	Apps	Goals	Apps	Goals	Apps	Goals
TPV	1996	Ykkönen	18	5	–		–		–		18	5
TPV	1997	Ykkönen	19	1	–		–		–		19	1
TPV	1998	Ykkönen	19	2	–		–		–		19	2
TPV	1999	Veikkausliiga	18	6	–		–		–		18	6
TPV	Total		74	4	–	–	–	–	–	–	74	4
Jazz (loan)	1997	Veikkausliiga	1	0	0	0	–		–		1	0
HJK	1999	Veikkausliiga	9	0	0	0	–		2 (Note: Includes UEFA Cup)	0	11	0
HJK	2000	Veikkausliiga	19	1	1	0	–		2	0	22	1
HJK	2001	Veikkausliiga	32	5	0	0	–		4	1	36	6
HJK	2002	Veikkausliiga	26	7	0	0	–		2	0	28	7
HJK	2003	Veikkausliiga	24	4	1	0	–		4 (Note: Includes UEFA Champions League)	0	29	4
HJK	2004	Veikkausliiga	13	0	0	0	–		4	0	17	0
HJK	Total		123	17	2	0	–	–	18	1	143	18
Molde	2004	Tippeligaen	7	2	–		–		–		7	2
Molde	2005	Tippeligaen	23	3	2	0	–		–		25	3
Molde	2006	Tippeligaen	24	1	–		–		4	0	28	1
Molde	Total		54	6	2	0	–	–	4	0	60	6
Young Boys	2006–07	Swiss Super League	15	0	1	0	–		–		16	0
Young Boys	2007–08	Swiss Super League	6	2	1	0	–		3	0	10	2
Young Boys	Total		21	2	2	0	–	–	3	0	26	2
Fulham (loan)	2007–08	Premier League	0	0	0	0	0	0	–		0	0
Fulham	2008–09	Premier League	3	0	0	0	2 (Note: Includes EFL League Cup)	0	–		5	0
Fulham	2009–10	Premier League	1	0	1	0	0	0	–		2	0
Fulham	Total		4	0	1	0	2	0	–	–	7	0
Sheffield United (loan)	2009–10	Championship	8	0	–		–		–		8	0
Viking	2010	Tippeligaen	1	0	–		–		–		1	0
Muangthong United	2011	Thai League 1	1	0	–		–		1 (Note: Includes AFC Champions League)	0	2	0
Inter Turku	2011	Veikkausliiga	18	2	–		–		–		18	2
Ilves	2012	Kakkonen	21	5	–		–		–		21	5
Ilves	2013	Ykkönen	17	1	–		–		–		17	1
Ilves	Total		38	6	–	–	–	–	–	–	38	6
Career total			343	37	7	0	2	0	26	1	378	38

=== International ===
As of 18 August 2011

Finland national team
Year	Apps	Goals
2000	5	1
2001	0	0
2002	3	0
2003	0	0
2004	4	0
2005	6	0
2006	9	0
2007	8	0
2008	8	1
2009	5	0
2010	1	0
2011	0	0
Total	49	2

=== International goals ===
Finland's score given first. As of 18 August 2011.

Toni Kallio international goals
#	Date	Location	Opponent	Result	Competition
1.	27 February 2000	Bangkok, Thailand	Thailand	1–5	31st King's Cup
2.	2 June 2008	Turku, Finland	Belarus	1–1	Friendly
