= Rob Friend =

Canadian Soccer Player (born 1981)

Robert Friend
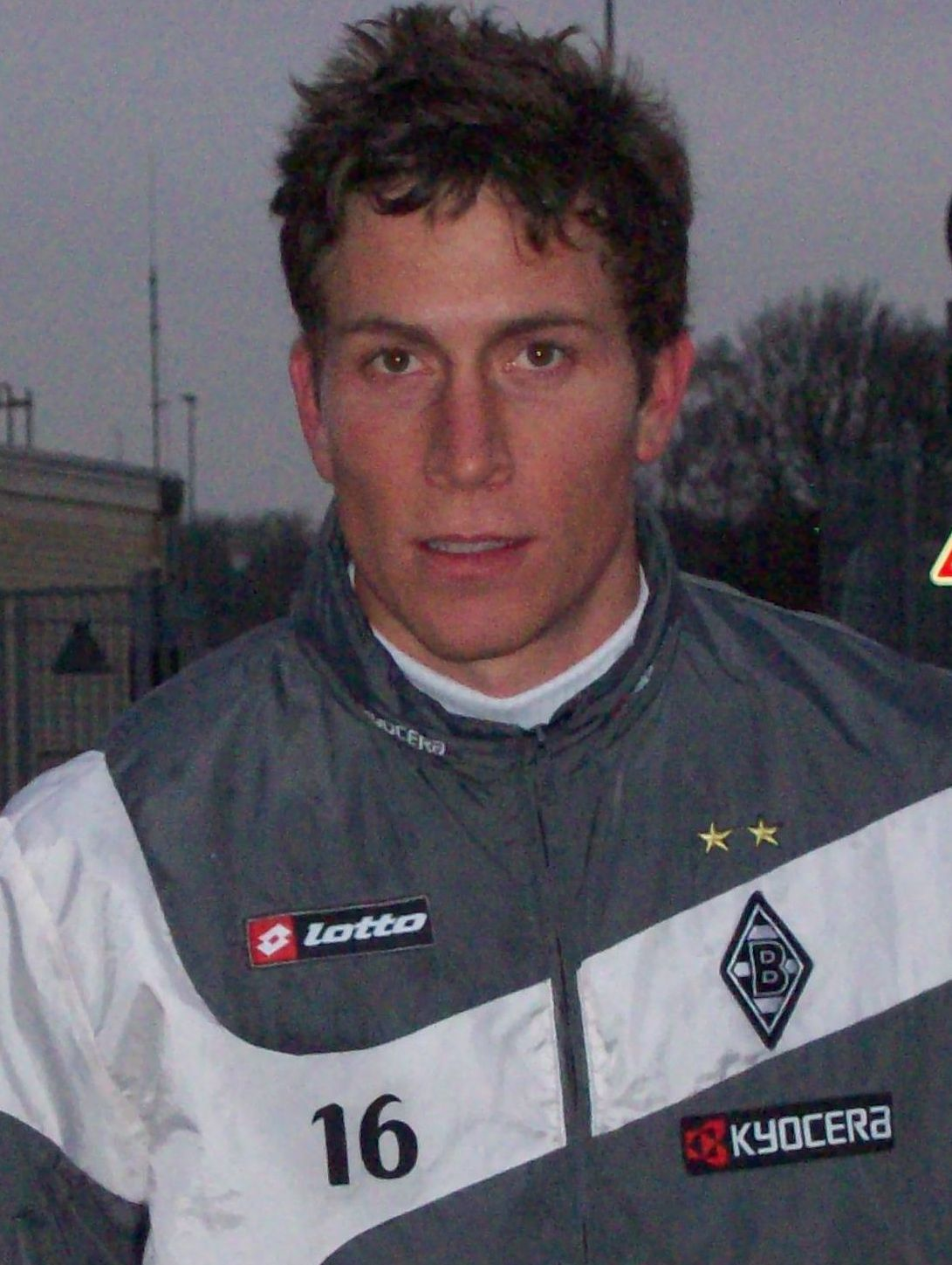
- Friend with Borussia Mönchengladbach in 2008
- Born: Robert Douglas Friend; 23 January 1981 (age 45); Rosetown, Canada
- Occupations: Chief Executive Officer; Footballer; businessman
- Organisations: DRG Investment Group; SixFive Sport Fund; Toca Football Canada
- Height: 6 ft 5 in (196 cm)
Association football career
- Position: Forward
Youth career
- 1998: Okanagan Challenge
- 1998: Crewe Alexandra
College career
Years	Team	Apps	(Gls)
1999–2000	Western Michigan Broncos	40	(9)
2001–2002	UC Santa Barbara Gauchos	40	(31)
Senior career*
Years	Team	Apps	(Gls)
2003–2004	Moss FK	41	(16)
2004–2006	Molde FK	40	(14)
2006–2007	SC Heerenveen	19	(5)
2007	→ Heracles Almelo (loan)	12	(3)
2007–2010	Borussia Mönchengladbach	83	(28)
2010–2011	Hertha BSC	25	(5)
2011–2014	Eintracht Frankfurt	13	(1)
2012	Eintracht Frankfurt II	1	(2)
2013–2014	→ 1860 Munich (loan)	24	(5)
2014	LA Galaxy	10	(0)
Total		268	(79)
International career
2001	Canada U20	2	(0)
2001–2004	Canada U23	11	(12)
2003–2011	Canada	32	(2)
- * Club domestic league appearances and goals

Robert Douglas Friend (born 23 January 1981) is a Canadian former professional soccer player, the president and co-founder of Vancouver FC, the CEO and co-founder of Pacific FC, the founder of Toca Football Canada, the co-founder of Canadian Premier League, the managing partner of SixFive Sport Fund also DRG Investment Group, and currently appointed as chief executive officer for Malaysia national team.

== Early life and education ==
Friend was born 23 January 1981 in Rosetown, Saskatchewan, Canada, and grew up in Kelowna, British Columbia. He was the first Kelowna-based player to make the British Columbia Provincial team, a collection of top youth players, and was named captain of the 1997 team. Friend was exposed to senior level play early, appearing for Okanagan Challenge of the Premier Development Soccer League as well as appearing in an exhibition for the Vancouver 86ers of the A-League.

Despite training with English club Crewe Alexandra F.C., Friend decided to attend Western Michigan University instead of turning pro. He played college soccer for the Western Michigan Broncos from 1999 to 2000, appearing in 40 games and scoring nine goals.

Friend transferred to the University of California, Santa Barbara (UCSB) and finished his collegiate career with the UC Santa Barbara Gauchos men's soccer team. As a senior, Friend scored in 12 consecutive matches which ranks fifth in NCAA Division I history. He appeared in 40 games for the Gauchos, scoring 31 goals and assisting on 9 more. He was named as a 2002 All-American, becoming the first Gaucho in 32 years to receive the honour.

== Club career ==
=== Norway ===
After graduation from UCSB, Friend went on trial with Moss FK in December 2002. After a positive showing, he signed a two-year deal in December 2002 for Moss FK's upcoming 2003 Norwegian First Division season. Despite his contract with Moss FK, Friend was drafted in the 4th Round (35th Overall) of the 2003 MLS SuperDraft by Chicago Fire making him the first player from UCSB drafted to MLS.

Friend made 41 league appearances and scored 16 league goals for Moss FK over his two-season span with the club before being transferred to Molde FK in August 2004. With Molde, he won the 2005 Norwegian Football Cup and scored a goal in the final. He remained with the Molde FK until 2006, making 40 league appearances and scoring 14 league goals for the club.

=== The Netherlands ===
Early 2006 saw interest in Friend rise with Crystal Palace F.C. and Vålerenga Fotball among teams looking to purchase him. It was announced in late March 2006 that he was sold to SC Heerenveen ahead of the 2006–07 Eredivisie season. Per terms of the agreement, his last game for Molde FK was in July and a portion of the transfer fee went to his original club Moss FK.

After making 19 appearances with Heerenveen and scoring five goals, he was loaned to Heracles Almelo in January 2007 to conclude the 2006–07 Eredivisie season. Despite his contributions, Heerenveen deemed him surplus to requirements and transferred him.

=== Germany ===
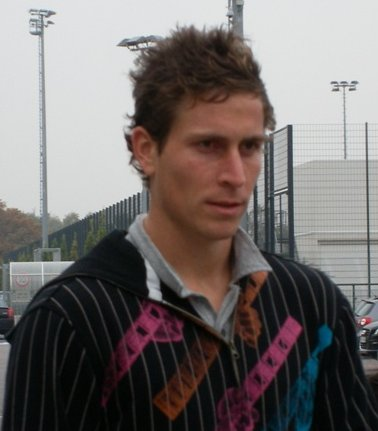
Friend with Borussia Mönchengladbach in October 2007

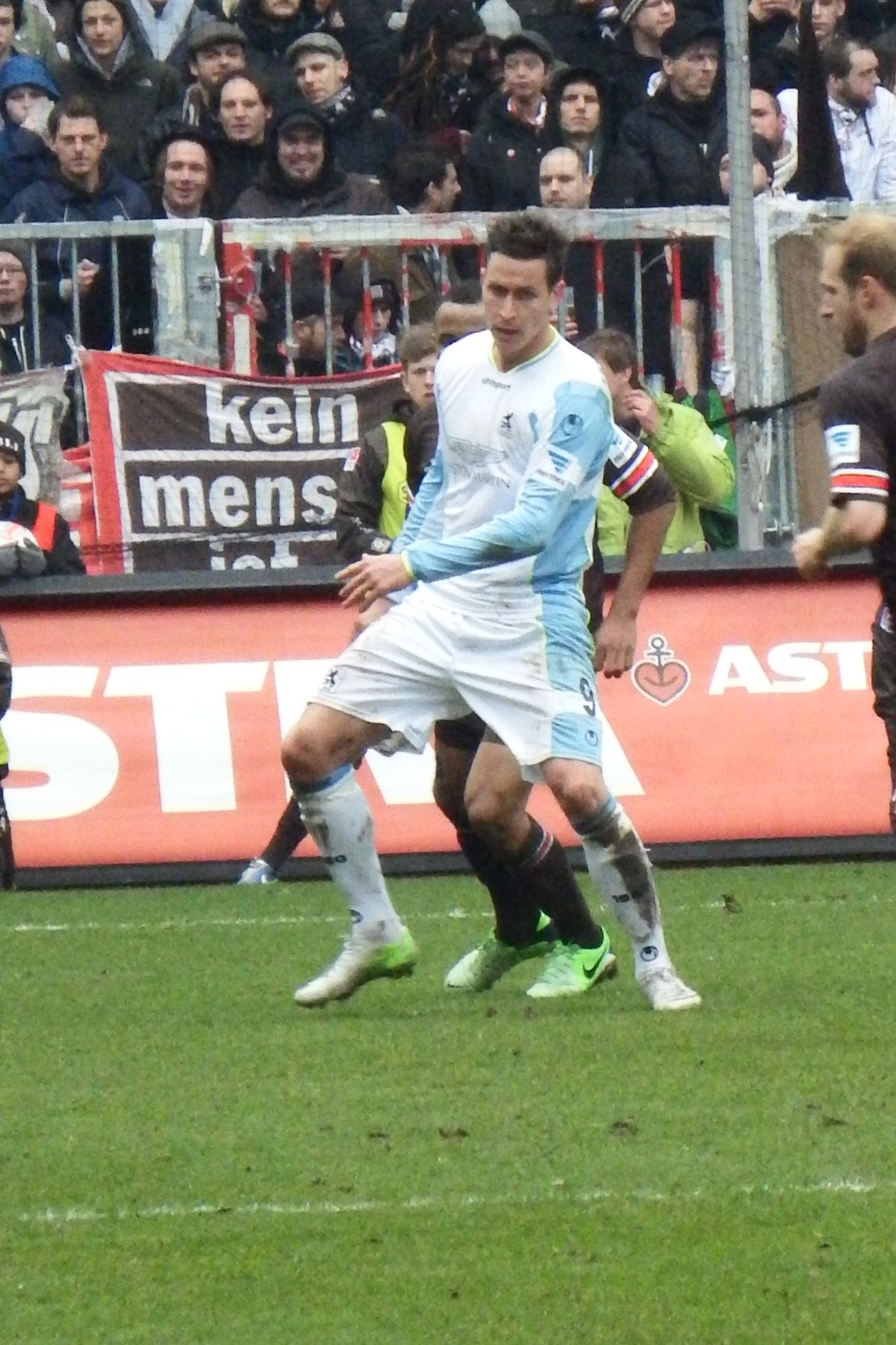
Friend with TSV 1860 Munich

During the 2007–08 season Friend scored 18 goals in 33 matches, making him Borussia Mönchengladbach's top scorer and the second top scorer in 2. Bundesliga. His team finished first and was promoted to the Bundesliga.

On 17 August 2008, Friend scored in his first game in the Bundesliga, against VfB Stuttgart. After three years in Mönchengladbach, including two in the Bundesliga, Friend was sold from the club and was bought by the newly relegated Hertha BSC for €1.8 million.

Friend made his debut and scored his first goal for Berlin on 14 August 2010 in a DFB-Pokal cup match versus Pfullendorf, the game ended as a 2–0 victory. Six days later he made his league debut for the team in a 3–2 victory over Rot-Weiß Oberhausen. On 12 September, Friend had a man of the match performance scoring two goals in a 3–1 home victory over Arminia Bielefeld at Olympic Stadium. Friend finished his first season with Hertha having scored six goals in 27 appearances in the 2. Bundesliga and DFB-Pokal. He helped Hertha win the 2. Bundesliga gaining automatic promotion back to top-flight football. On the final day of the 2011 summer transfer window, Friend returned to the second division, joining the newly relegated Eintracht Frankfurt. He was close to re-joining Major League Soccer in the United States in January 2013, but despite interest from Vancouver Whitecaps FC Friend saw his contract to completion in Germany.

=== United States ===
On 13 January 2014, Friend made the move to Major League Soccer club Los Angeles Galaxy. After one season with Los Angeles, which included winning the 2014 MLS Cup, Friend announced his retirement on 10 December 2014 due to issues stemming from concussions.

== International career ==
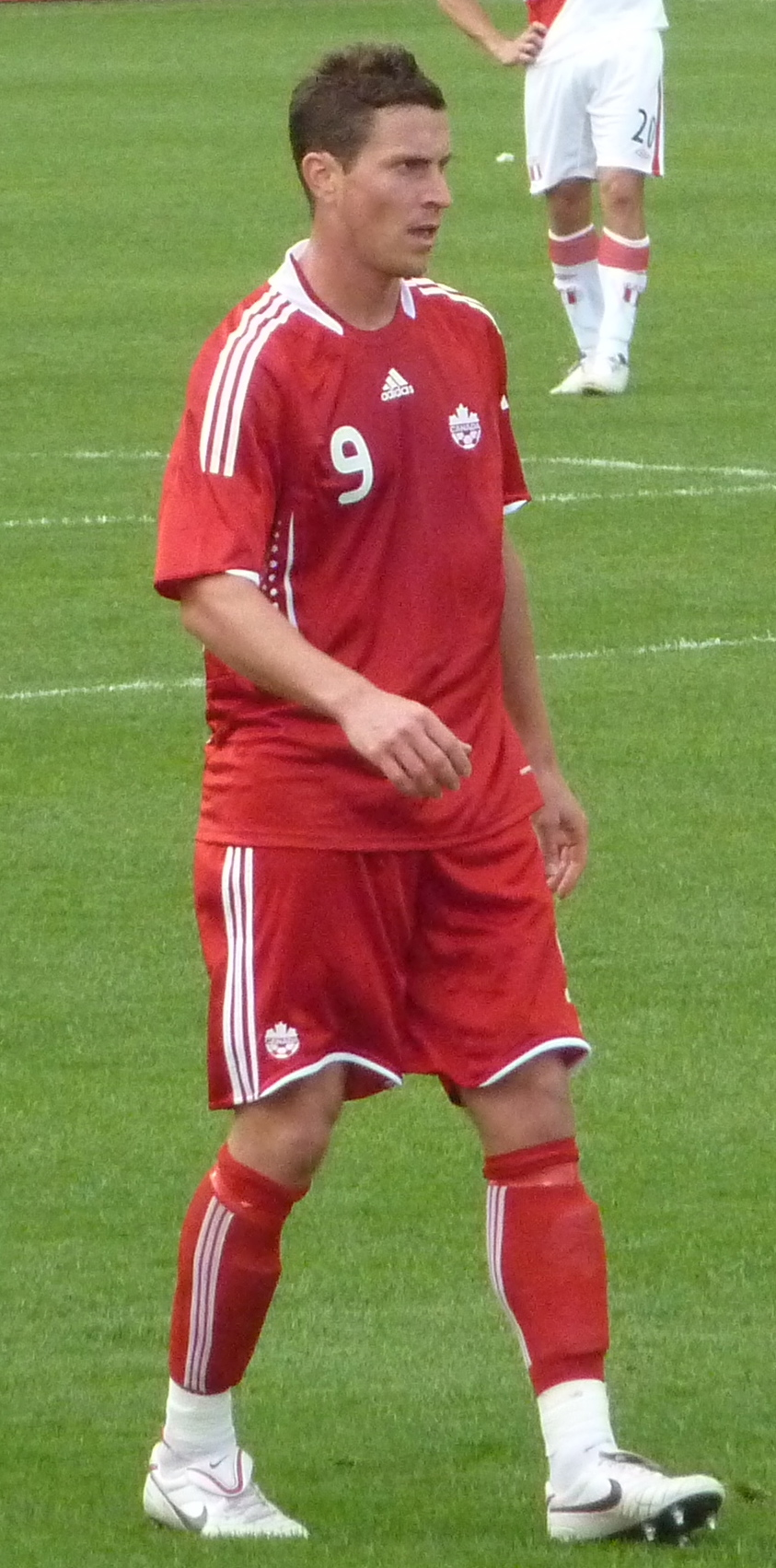
Friend playing against Peru at BMO Field on 4 September 2010

Friend has represented Canada at the U-20, U-23, and senior levels. He saw action in the 2001 FIFA World Youth Championship, as well as the 2004 CONCACAF Men Pre-Olympic Tournament.

Friend debuted with the senior international team on 18 January 2003 in a friendly with the United States. Since then, and as of February 2013, he has been capped 32 times by his country, scoring twice. He has represented Canada in five FIFA World Cup qualification matches.

== Personal life ==
Friend was inducted into the UCSB Intercollegiate Athletics Hall of Fame in 2008. In August 2014, he was named as the inaugural sports ambassador for the Academy for Canadians in Sports and Entertainment – Los Angeles.

Friend is married to Marisa Lauren "Mari" Bell, a former UC Santa Barbara women's volleyball player. The couple have three children.

Friend was featured in the book Saskatchewan Soccer People: Martin Nash, Rob Friend, Kevin Holness, Jordan Schidlowsky, Brian Philley, Norman Sheldon, Amy Vermeulen.

== Career statistics ==
=== Club ===
Appearances and goals by club, season and competition
Club	Season	League			Cup		Continental		Other		Total	
Club	Season	Division	Apps	Goals	Apps	Goals	Apps	Goals	Apps	Goals	Apps	Goals
Moss	2003	First Division	25	8	3	2	—		—		28	10
Moss	2004	First Division	16	8	3	0	—		—		19	8
Moss	Total		41	16	6	2	0	0	0	0	93	35
Molde	2004	Tippeligaen	6	2	0	0	—		—		6	2
Molde	2005	Tippeligaen	25	10	6	3	—		—		31	13
Molde	2006	Tippeligaen	9	2	0	0	—		0	0	9	2
Molde	Total		40	14	6	3	0	0	0	0	46	17
Heerenveen	2006–07	Eredivisie	19	5	1	0	6	0	0	0	26	5
Heracles Almelo (loan)	2006–07	Eredivisie	12	3	0	0	—		—		12	3
Borussia Mönchengladbach	2007–08	2. Bundesliga	33	18	1	0	—		—		34	18
Borussia Mönchengladbach	2008–09	Bundesliga	24	7	1	0	—		—		25	7
Borussia Mönchengladbach	2009–10	Bundesliga	26	3	0	0	—		—		26	3
Borussia Mönchengladbach	Total		83	28	2	0	0	0	0	0	85	28
Hertha BSC	2010–11	2. Bundesliga	25	5	2	1	—		—		27	6
Eintracht Frankfurt	2011–12	2. Bundesliga	13	1	1	0	—		—		14	1
Eintracht Frankfurt	2012–13	Bundesliga	0	0	0	0	—		—		0	0
Eintracht Frankfurt	Total		13	1	1	0	0	0	0	0	14	1
Eintracht Frankfurt II	2012–13	Regionalliga Südwest	1	2	–		—		—		1	2
1860 Munich	2012–13	2. Bundesliga	14	4	0	0	—		—		14	4
1860 Munich	2013–14	2. Bundesliga	10	1	2	0	—		—		12	1
1860 Munich	Total		24	5	2	0	0	0	0	0	26	5
LA Galaxy	2014	MLS	10	0	1	0	1	0	—		12	0
Career total			268	79	21	6	7	0	0	0	296	85

=== International ===
Appearances and goals by national team and year
National team	Year	Apps	Goals
Canada	2003	3	0
Canada	2004	1	0
Canada	2005	0	0
Canada	2006	5	1
Canada	2007	5	0
Canada	2008	8	1
Canada	2009	2	0
Canada	2010	3	0
Canada	2011	5	0
Total		32	2

Scores and results list Canada's goal tally first, score column indicates score after each Friend goal.

List of international goals scored by Rob Friend
No.	Date	Venue	Opponent	Score	Result	Competition
1	4 September 2006	Complexe sportif Claude-Robillard, Montreal, Canada	Jamaica	1–0	1–0	Friendly
2	31 May 2008	Qwest Field, Seattle, United States	Brazil	1–1	2–3	Friendly
