= John Andreas Husøy =

Norwegian footballer (born 1983)

Personal information
- Date of birth: 26 January 1983 (age 43)
- Position: Midfielder

Team information
- Current team: Åsane
- Number: 17

Youth career
- 2001–2002: Molde

Senior career*
Years	Team	Apps	(Gls)
2003–2006	Molde	31	(2)
2006–2008	Moss	52	(2)
2008	→ Sarpsborg 08 (loan)	15	(3)
2009	Brattvåg		
2012–2013	Åsane	19	(1)
- * Club domestic league appearances and goals

John Andreas Husøy (born 26 January 1983) is a Norwegian former footballer.

== Career ==
He came to Molde FK as a youth player and played 17 league games in 2005. In the same season he scored the last goal in Molde's 4–2 victory against Lillestrøm in the 2005 Norwegian Football Cup Final.

In the 2006 season he moved to Moss FK, and became a regular here. In the 2008 season he moved to Sarpsborg 08 FF on loan, with no contract renewal. He instead played for Brattvåg IL, and later Åsane Fotball.

== Honours ==
Molde FK

- Norwegian Cup: 2005
