= Pål Strand =

Norwegian footballer (born 1976)

Personal information
- Date of birth: 9 March 1976 (age 50)
- Place of birth: Gjøvik, Norway
- Height: 1.80 m (5 ft 11 in)
- Position: Midfielder

Senior career*
Years	Team	Apps	(Gls)
1995–1997	Gjøvik-Lyn		
1998	Raufoss	25	(5)
1999–2007	Lillestrøm	168	(11)
2008–2009	Hamarkameratene	13	(0)
2010–2012	Raufoss		

International career
2001	Norway	2	(0)
- * Club domestic league appearances and goals

Pål Strand (born 9 March 1976) is a retired Norwegian football midfielder. Before transferring to Ham-Kam in 2008, he played for Lillestrøm for ten seasons. Previously he played for Gjøvik-Lyn and Raufoss. He has been capped 2 times for the Norwegian national team, coming on as a last-minute substitute each time.

== Honours ==
- Norwegian Football Cup: 2007
