= 2005 Tippeligaen =

61st season of top-tier football league in Norway

Tippeligaen
- Season: 2005
- Dates: 10 April – 29 October
- Champions: Vålerenga; 5th title
- Relegated: Aalesund; Bodø/Glimt
- Champions League: Vålerenga
- UEFA Cup: Molde; Start; Lyn; Brann
- Intertoto Cup: Lillestrøm
- Matches played: 182
- Goals scored: 515 (2.83 per match)
- Top goalscorer: Ole Martin Årst (16 goals)
- Biggest home win: Rosenborg 6–0 Odd Grenland (25 September 2005); Lyn 6–0 Bodø/Glimt (29 October 2005)
- Biggest away win: Odd Grenland 0–5 Rosenborg (29 May 2005)
- Highest scoring: Start 4–5 Aalesund (15 October 2005)
- Longest winning run: 5 games Vålerenga; Viking; Tromsø; Odd Grenland
- Longest unbeaten run: 10 games Vålerenga
- Longest winless run: 11 games Tromsø
- Longest losing run: 6 games Rosenborg
- Highest attendance: 24,894; Vålerenga 0–2 Rosenborg (23 October 2005)
- Lowest attendance: 3,051; Odd Grenland 2–1 Molde (12 June 2005)
- Average attendance: 9,496 ▲19.1%

The 2005 Tippeligaen was the 61st completed season of top division football in Norway. The season began on 10 April 2005, and was concluded with the last of 26 rounds played on 29 October. 3 points were given for wins and 1 for draws.

Vålerenga, the winner of this year's season entered the second round of next year's Champions League qualification, while the runners-up (Start), number 3 (Lyn) and the Norwegian Cup winners enter the UEFA Cup qualification round. The top four teams qualified for the 2004–05 Royal League.

1,726,145 people attended the matches, a new record for the Tippeligaen and 300,000 more than the previous year. It is also more than twice as many as in 1995, when only 841,717 attended the matches during the whole season. The 2005 season was, as of 2019, the last season where all the teams in the division played on natural turfs only.

== Overview ==
=== Summary ===
The greatest surprises of the 2005 season were the great performance of Start, promoted to the Tippeligaen in the 2004 season and ended up winning silver, and the disappointing performance of Rosenborg which fought against relegation from the top division after winning it for 13 straight seasons.

The season ended on a sad note as Fredrikstad's Dagfinn Enerly got a serious neck injury in the last round match against Start on 29 October 2005, which made him a paraplegic. Start lost the game 1–3 which meant that Vålerenga secured their fifth league title with a 2–2 draw against Odd Grenland in Skien.

Number thirteen (Aalesund) and fourteen (Bodø/Glimt) were relegated to 1. divisjon, while number twelve (Molde) had to play a two-legged play-off (home and away) against Moss, third-place finisher in Adeccoligaen, for the last spot in next year's season. Molde won the play-off matches 5–2 on aggregate and remained in Tippeligaen.

== Teams and locations ==
Fourteen teams competed in the league – the top twelve teams from the previous season, and two teams promoted from 1. divisjon.

Locations of the teams in 2005 Tippeligaen

Note: Table lists in alphabetical order.

Team	Ap.	Location	Stadium
Aalesund	5	Ålesund	Color Line Stadion
Bodø/Glimt	17	Bodø	Aspmyra Stadion
Brann	49	Bergen	Brann Stadion
Fredrikstad	36	Fredrikstad	Fredrikstad Stadion
HamKam	20	Hamar	Briskeby
Lillestrøm	42	Lillestrøm	Åråsen Stadion
Lyn	32	Oslo	Ullevaal Stadion
Molde	30	Molde	Molde Stadion
Odd Grenland	25	Skien	Odd Stadion
Rosenborg	42	Trondheim	Lerkendal Stadion
Start	31	Kristiansand	Kristiansand Stadion
Tromsø	19	Tromsø	Alfheim Stadion
Vålerenga	45	Oslo	Ullevaal Stadion
Viking	56	Stavanger	Viking Stadion

== League table ==
Pos	Team	Pld	W	D	L	GF	GA	GD	Pts	Qualification or relegation
1	Vålerenga (C)	26	13	7	6	40	27	+13	46	Qualification for the Champions League second qualifying round
2	Start	26	13	6	7	47	35	+12	45	Qualification for the UEFA Cup first qualifying round
3	Lyn	26	12	8	6	37	21	+16	44	Qualification for the UEFA Cup first qualifying round
4	Lillestrøm	26	12	6	8	37	31	+6	42	
5	Viking	26	12	5	9	37	32	+5	41	
6	Brann	26	10	7	9	43	32	+11	37	Qualification for the UEFA Cup first qualifying round (Note: Brann qualified for the UEFA Cup first qualifying round through the UEFA Fair Play ranking award.)
7	Rosenborg	26	10	4	12	50	42	+8	34	
8	Tromsø	26	8	10	8	31	30	+1	34	
9	Odd Grenland	26	9	6	11	28	51	−23	33	
10	Ham-Kam	26	8	7	11	31	37	−6	31	
11	Fredrikstad	26	8	7	11	35	44	−9	31	
12	Molde (Note: Molde qualified for the UEFA Cup second qualifying round as winners of the Norwegian Cup.) (O)	26	8	6	12	40	46	−6	30	UEFA Cup second qualifying round and relegation play-offs
13	Aalesund (R)	26	6	9	11	30	42	−12	27	Relegation to First Division
14	Bodø/Glimt (R)	26	6	6	14	29	45	−16	24	Relegation to First Division

Source: fotball.no
Rules for classification: 1) points; 2) goal difference; 3) number of goals scored.
(C) Champions; (O) Play-off winners; (R) Relegated

== Relegation play-offs ==
Molde won the two-legged play-offs against Moss 5–2 on aggregate and avoided relegation.

13 November 2005
13:00 CET (UTC+1)

Moss	2–3	Molde
Fredriksen 7'; Michelsen 67' (pen.)	Report	Andreasson 16'; Konate 39', 42'

Melløs Stadion, Moss
Attendance: 4,022
Referee: Tommy Skjerven

19 November 2005
16:00 CET (UTC+2)

Molde	2–0	Moss
Friend 61'; Mavrič 74'	Report

Molde Stadion, Molde
Attendance: 6,321
Referee: Terje Hauge

Molde won 5–2 on aggregate and remained in Tippeligaen.

== Results ==
Home \ Away	AAL	BOD	BRA	FRE	HAM	LIL	LYN	MOL	ODD	ROS	IKS	TRO	VÅL	VIK
Aalesund	—	1–1	1–3	1–0	1–1	1–0	1–1	1–4	2–1	2–1	1–2	0–1	0–2	1–2
Bodø/Glimt	0–0	—	2–1	1–2	2–0	1–1	1–3	2–0	5–1	0–1	1–1	2–1	0–1	0–3
Brann	0–0	2–3	—	4–0	2–0	6–2	3–0	2–0	2–2	4–1	1–0	0–0	1–2	2–1
Fredrikstad	1–4	3–2	2–3	—	1–1	1–1	2–1	1–1	1–1	5–1	1–2	4–2	0–4	2–1
Ham-Kam	2–1	2–0	1–1	1–1	—	2–3	1–0	4–1	2–1	0–3	0–2	3–2	3–1	0–0
Lillestrøm	3–0	2–0	1–0	3–0	1–0	—	1–0	2–2	2–3	1–1	2–0	1–2	2–1	2–0
Lyn	0–0	6–0	1–0	1–1	1–0	1–0	—	6–1	1–2	3–2	1–1	0–1	1–1	2–1
Molde	2–2	1–1	3–1	2–1	1–1	2–0	1–3	—	4–0	4–1	0–1	2–1	1–3	1–2
Odd Grenland	2–1	2–1	0–0	2–1	2–2	0–2	0–2	2–1	—	0–5	2–0	1–1	2–2	1–0
Rosenborg	2–2	2–0	4–1	0–1	4–0	1–2	0–1	1–1	6–0	—	3–0	1–1	2–3	0–2
Start	4–5	2–0	3–2	1–3	2–1	3–1	1–1	1–0	4–0	5–2	—	1–1	3–0	5–2
Tromsø	1–1	2–2	1–1	2–0	1–0	1–1	0–0	2–1	0–1	1–2	3–1	—	0–1	1–0
Vålerenga	3–1	3–1	2–1	0–0	2–1	0–0	0–1	3–1	3–0	0–2	1–1	1–1	—	1–2
Viking	3–0	2–1	0–0	2–1	1–3	3–1	0–0	2–3	1–0	3–2	1–1	3–2	0–0	—

Source: NIFS (in Norwegian)
Legend: Blue = home team win; Yellow = draw; Red = away team win.

== International ==
- Vålerenga goes to 2006–07 UEFA Champions League qualification round
- Start (2nd), Lyn (3rd) and Molde (Norwegian Cup winner) go to 2006–07 UEFA Cup qualification round
- Vålerenga (1st), Start (2nd), Lyn (3rd) and Lillestrøm (4th) qualify for 2005–06 Royal League

== Season statistics ==
=== Top scorers ===
Rank	Scorer	Club	Goals
1	(Norway) Ole Martin Årst	Tromsø	16
2	(Norway) Egil Østenstad	Viking	14
3	(Norway) Thorstein Helstad	Rosenborg	13
4	(Norway) Arild Sundgot	Lillestrøm	11
5	(Canada) Rob Friend	Molde	10
6	(Norway) Morten Berre	Vålerenga	9
6	(Norway) Bengt Sæternes	Brann	9
8	(Norway) Marius Johnsen	Start	8
8	(Slovenia) Robert Koren	Lillestrøm	8
8	(Canada) Olivier Occéan	Odd Grenland	8
8	(Norway) Espen Olsen	Ham-Kam	8
8	(Sweden) Markus Ringberg	Ham-Kam	8
8	(Norway) Jan Derek Sørensen	Lyn	8
8	(Norway) Jo Tessem	Lyn	8
8	(Scotland) Robbie Winters	Brann	8

=== Discipline ===
==== Player ====
- Most yellow cards: 7
  - (Norway) Runar Berg (Bodø/Glimt)
  - (Norway) Simen Brenne (Fredrikstad)
- Most red cards: 1
  - 19 players

==== Club ====
- Most yellow cards: 47
  - Odd
- Most red cards: 3
  - Rosenborg
  - Tromsø

=== Attendances ===
Pos	Team	Total	High	Low	Average	Change
1	Rosenborg	228,136	21,386	13,316	17,549	+1.0%
2	Vålerenga	203,560	24,894	8,864	15,658	+8.8%
3	Brann	192,753	17,503	12,282	14,827	+7.7%
4	Viking	178,087	15,231	11,967	13,699	+10.0%
5	Aalesund	138,032	10,903	10,370	10,618	n/a^{1}
6	Start	131,342	16,563	5,463	10,103	n/a^{1}
7	Fredrikstad	114,568	10,288	7,406	8,813	+1.3%
8	Lillestrøm	102,162	11,403	5,980	7,859	+10.5%
9	Molde	84,659	11,167	4,525	6,512	+17.2%
10	Lyn	84,243	15,268	4,025	6,480	+43.2%
11	HamKam	73,216	8,016	3,733	5,632	+0.9%
12	Odd Grenland	69,634	8,734	3,051	5,356	+5.8%
13	Tromsø	65,824	8,235	3,591	5,063	−10.4%
14	Bodø/Glimt	62,111	6,198	3,569	4,778	+4.1%
	League total	1,728,327	24,894	3,051	9,496	+19.1%

Source: nifs.no
Notes:
1: Team played last season in 1. divisjon.
