= 2005 Norwegian Football Cup =

Norgesmesterskapet i fotball for herrer

Tournament details
- Country: Norway
- Teams: 128 (main competition)

Final positions
- Champions: Molde (2nd title)
- Runners-up: Lillestrøm

Tournament statistics
- Matches played: 127
- Goals scored: 516 (4.06 per match)
- Top goal scorer(s): Bernt Nikolai Huslker (12 goals)

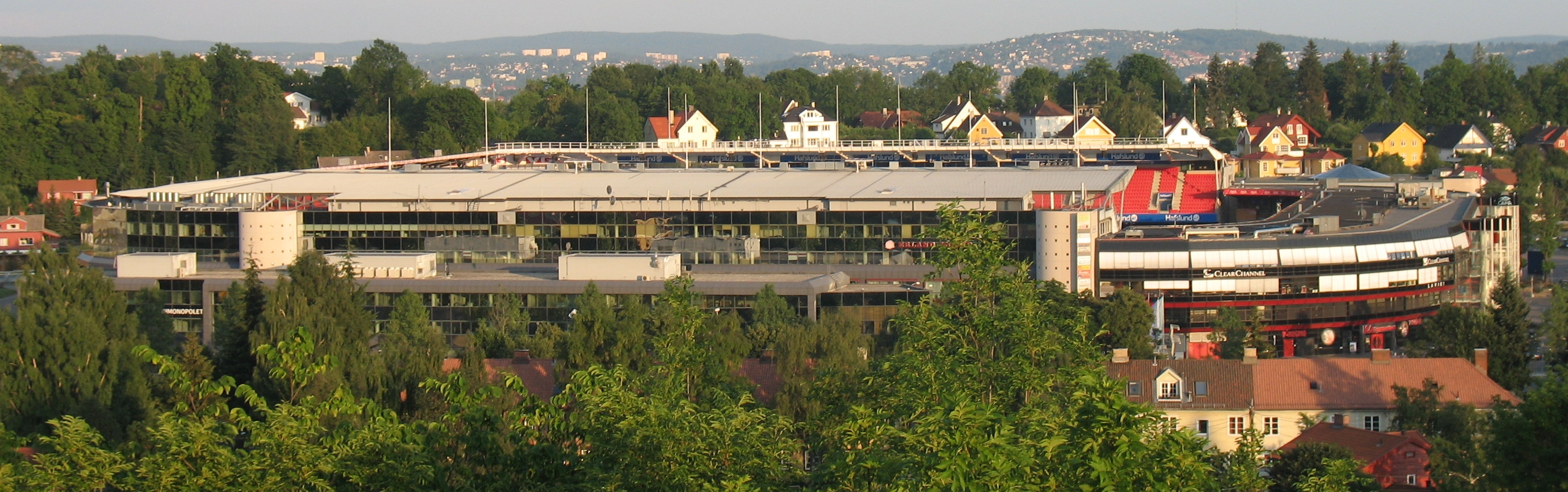
Ullevaal Stadion, Oslo - venue for the Norwegian Cup final

The 2005 Norwegian Football Cup was the 100th edition of the Norwegian Football Cup. The tournament started on 7 May 2005 and was contested by 128 teams, going through 7 rounds before a winner could be declared. The final match was played on 6 November at Ullevaal stadion in Oslo. Molde won their 2nd Norwegian Championship title after defeating Lillestrøm in the final with the score 4–2 after extra time.

The clubs from Tippeligaen all made it to the third round (round of 32) without problems. Two surprises came in the third round, as Lyn and Tromsø lost to Hønefoss and Alta respectively. Alta's inclusion into the fourth round (round of 16) marked the longest a club from Finnmark had ever come in the Norwegian men's football cup. Alta lost to Odd Grenland in the fourth round, while Hønefoss continued to surprise, eventually making it to the semi-finals before being knocked out by Molde.

Molde won the cup by defeating Lillestrøm 4–2 in the final match after extra time.

== Calendar ==
Below are the dates for each round as given by the official schedule:

Round	Date(s)	Number of fixtures	Clubs
First Round	10–11 May 2005	64	128 → 64
Second Round	18–19 May 2005	32	64 → 32
Third Round	15 June 2005	16	32 → 16
Fourth Round	29–30 June 2005	8	16 → 8
Quarter-finals	20–21 August 2005	4	8 → 4
Semi-finals	21–22 September 2005	2	4 → 2
Final	6 November 2005	1	2 → 1

== First round ==
Team 1	Score	Team 2
7 May 2005
Gneist	0–5	Brann
10 May 2005
Orkla	0–11	Rosenborg
Tromsdalen	3–0	Mjølner
11 May 2005
Bossekop	1–2	Alta
Brumunddal	0–5	Groruddalen
Bygdø	0–1	Skeid
Byåsen	1–1 (4–2 p)	Averøykameratene
Bærum	5–1	Gjøvik-Lyn
Dahle	0–8	Molde
Drøbak/Frogn	5–0	Eidsvold
Eidsvold Turn	2–1	Ringsaker
Elverum	0–7	HamKam
Fauske/Sprint	2–4	Bodø/Glimt
Flekkerøy	4–0	Egersund
Flint	0–4	Tønsberg
Fossum	0–8	Stabæk
Fram Larvik	3–2	Larvik Turn
Frigg	2–1	Tollnes
Gresvik	1–3	Fredrikstad
Hadeland	2–10	Vålerenga
Hareid	0–4	Aalesund
Hovding	2–1	Fana
Høyang	0–10	Sogndal
Innstranden	3–6	Mo
Ishavsbyen	0–4	Tromsø
Jerv	1–2	Pors Grenland
Jevnaker	0–4	Strømsgodset
Klemetsrud	1–3	Lyn
Klepp	3–2	Ålgård
Kolstad	3–2	Træff
Kopervik	0–1	Haugesund
Korsvoll	0–6	Follo
Kvik Halden	1–2	Kjelsås
Langesund/Stathelle	0–4	Odd Grenland
Levanger	7–0	Rissa
Lofoten	5–2	Skarp
Lyngdal	1–2	Start
Lyngen/Karnes	4–3	Harstad
Mercantile	1–2	Lillehammer
Mjøndalen	1–2	Hønefoss
Notodden	9–0	KFUM Oslo
Nybergsund	14–2	Grue
Radøy/Manger	2–0	Jotun Årdalstangen
Ranheim	1–0	NTNUI
Raufoss	4–0	Asker
Runar	1–3	Sandefjord
Rørvik	2–3	Strindheim
Råde	1–2	Moss
Sander	0–1	Lillestrøm
Sandnes Ulf	1–0	Vidar
Stord/Moster	1–0	Askøy
Sparta Sarpsborg	2–1	Lørenskog
Stryn	2–4	Hødd
Strømmen	5–2	Sprint-Jeløy
Toten	0–10	Kongsvinger
Trio	0–1	Løv-Ham
Ullensaker/Kisa	0–2	Sarpsborg FK
Vard Haugesund	5–1	Randaberg
Vaulen	1–2	Viking
Verdal	1–1 (6–5 p)	Steinkjer
Vindbjart	1–3	Mandalskameratene
Voss	0–2	Bryne
Ørn-Horten	0–5	Oslo Øst
Åsane	1–4	Fyllingen

== Second round ==
Team 1	Score	Team 2
18 May 2005
Bryne	4–0	Sandnes Ulf
Drøbak/Frogn	0–5	Odd Grenland
Fram Larvik	1–2	Start
Haugesund	0–1	Vard Haugesund
Kjelsås	0–2	Hønefoss
Levanger	0–2	Aalesund
Lyngen/Karnes	1–2	Alta
Mo	2–5	Byåsen
Moss	2–1	Raufoss
Nybergsund	3–2 (a.e.t.)	Skeid
Ranheim	1–4	Bodø/Glimt
Sandefjord	2–1	Sparta Sarpsborg
Sarpsborg FK	0–4	Vålerenga
Stord/Moster	0–1 (a.e.t.)	Løv-Ham
Strindheim	4–2	Lofoten
Tromsdalen	1–3	Tromsø
Tønsberg	4–1	Notodden
19 May 2005
Eidsvold Turn	1–2	Lyn
Lillehammer	0–4	HamKam
Flekkerøy	0–2	Mandalskameratene
Follo	0–1	Strømsgodset
Fyllingen	3–5 (a.e.t.)	Sogndal
Groruddalen	1–5	Fredrikstad
Hødd	5–1	Hovding
Klepp	2–4	Viking
Kolstad	1–2	Molde
Oslo Øst	2–1 (a.e.t.)	Kongsvinger
Pors Grenland	2–0	Frigg
Radøy/Manger	1–3	Brann
Stabæk	6–2	Bærum
Strømmen	1–3	Lillestrøm
Verdal	0–7	Rosenborg

== Third round ==
Team 1	Score	Team 2
15 June 2005
Alta	2–1 (a.e.t.)	Tromsø
Bodø/Glimt	4–3 (a.e.t.)	Strindheim
Bryne	5–1	Tønsberg
Byåsen	1–8	Rosenborg
Fredrikstad	2–0	Sandefjord
Hønefoss	2–1	Lyn
Lillestrøm	5–3 (a.e.t.)	Moss
Molde	3–2	Nybergsund
Odd Grenland	1–0	Pors Grenland
Sogndal	0–1	HamKam
Start	2–1	Mandalskameratene
Strømsgodset	0–1	Stabæk
Vålerenga	7–0	Oslo Øst
Aalesund	3–1	Hødd
16 June 2005
Løv-Ham	0–1	Brann
22 June 2005
Vard Haugesund	0–3	Viking

== Fourth round ==
29 June 2005
18:00 CEST (UTC+2)

Bodø/Glimt	1–2	Molde
Sakariassen 27'	Report	Mavrič 7' (pen.); Friend 45'

Aspmyra Stadion, Bodø
Attendance: 1,352
Referee: Per Ivar Staberg

29 June 2005
18:00 CEST (UTC+2)

Brann	3–2	Aalesund
Guntveit 13'; Miller 64', 73'	Report	Holm 41'; Hoseth 89'

Brann Stadion, Bergen
Attendance: 5,979
Referee: Espen Berntsen

29 June 2005
18:00 CEST (UTC+2)

HamKam	2–0	Bryne
Frigård 50', 61'	Report

Briskeby gressbane, Hamar
Attendance: 1,898
Referee: Kjell Alseth

29 June 2005
18:00 CEST (UTC+2)

Odd Grenland	6–0	Alta
de Ornelas 21'; Tchoyi 47'; Hoff 78', 79', 86'; Fevang 82'	Report

Odd Stadion, Skien
Attendance: 1,135
Referee: Kjetil Sælen

29 June 2005
18:00 CEST (UTC+2)

Stabæk	4–2	Fredrikstad
Nannskog 36', 90'; Poljac 38'; Markegård 58'	Report	West 8'; Hoås 64'

Nadderud Stadion, Bærum
Attendance: 2,364
Referee: Roy Helge Olsen

30 June 2005
19:00 CEST (UTC+2)

Rosenborg	1–2	Hønefoss
Ødegaard 34'	Report	L. Lafton 36'; Tronseth 79'

Lerkendal Stadion, Trondheim
Attendance: 3,419
Referee: Jonny Ditlefsen

30 June 2005
19:00 CEST (UTC+2)

Viking	0–2	Lillestrøm
	Report	Kippe 61'; Sundgot 84'

Viking Stadion, Stavanger
Attendance: 5,518
Referee: Tom Henning Øvrebø

30 June 2005
19:00 CEST (UTC+2)

Start	2–3 (a.e.t.)	Vålerenga
Wright 81'; Midttun Lie 110'	Report	Hulsker 13'; Grindheim 97'; Hovi 118'

Kristiansand Stadion, Kristiansand
Attendance: 8,063
Referee: Tommy Skjerven

== Quarter-finals ==
20 August 2005
16:00 CEST (UTC+2)

Molde	2–1	Odd Grenland
Ohr 30', 68'	Report	Occean 18'

Molde Stadion, Molde
Attendance: 3,052
Referee: Brage Sandmoen

20 August 2005
19:00 CEST (UTC+2)

Vålerenga	2–1	Brann
Hulsker 15', 24'	Report	Miller 61'

Ullevaal Stadion, Oslo
Attendance: 13,882
Referee: Per Ivar Staberg

21 August 2005
16:00 CEST (UTC+2)

Hønefoss	4–0	HamKam
Øverby 9'; Koskela 17'; L. Lafton 81'; Saaliti 90'	Report

Hønefoss Idrettspark, Hønefoss
Attendance: 3,773
Referee: Tom Henning Øvrebø

21 August 2005
19:00 CEST (UTC+2)

Lillestrøm	3–1	Stabæk
Rambekk 33'; Powell 54', 75'	Report	Poljac 88'

Åråsen Stadion, Lillestrøm
Attendance: 4,943
Referee: Jonny Ditlefsen

== Semi-finals ==
21 September 2005
19:00 CEST (UTC+2)

Lillestrøm	2–0	Vålerenga
Andresen 7'; Sundgot 78'	Report

Åråsen Stadion, Lillestrøm
Attendance: 12,156
Referee: Espen Berntsen

22 September 2005
19:00 CEST (UTC+2)

Molde	1–0	Hønefoss
Hestad 73'	Report

Molde Stadion, Molde
Attendance: 6,925
Referee: Terje Hauge

== Final ==
6 November 2005
13:15 CET (UTC+1)

Molde	4–2 (a.e.t.)	Lillestrøm
Friend 25'; Konate 65'; Berg Hestad 94'; Husøy 108'	Report	Mouelhi 46'; Sundgot 90' (pen.)

Ullevaal Stadion, Oslo
Attendance: 25,182
Referee: Brage Sandmoen (Kjelsås)
