= Johan Nås =

Norwegian footballer (born 1983)

Personal information
- Full name: Johan Nils Nås
- Date of birth: 9 February 1983 (age 43)
- Height: 1.92 m (6 ft 3 1/2 in)
- Positions: Defender; striker

Senior career*
Years	Team	Apps	(Gls)
- Eide og Omegn
–2003	Træff		
2004	Lørenskog	?	(24)
2005	Molde	1	(0)
2006	Follo		
2007	Kongsvinger		
2007–2008	Follo		
2008	→ Ull/Kisa (loan)		
2009–2011	Strømmen		
2012–2013	Frigg		
- * Club domestic league appearances and goals

Johan Nås (born 9 February 1983) is a Norwegian football defender and striker.

Nås hails from Eide Municipality. He played for SK Træff in 2003, when his transfer to Lørenskog IF was announced. He scored 24 league goals in the 2004 season, and was subsequently purchased by first-tier club Molde FK. However, he flopped greatly, playing only one Norwegian top division game, in 2005, as an 86th-minute substitute.

In early 2006 he joined Follo FK. Since Follo were relegated, he joined Kongsvinger IL in early 2007; however, he returned after half a year. In August 2008 he was loaned out to Ullensaker/Kisa IL for the remainder of the season, In 2009, he joined Strømmen IF.

In 2012, he went on to Frigg Oslo FK.
