= Thomas Mork =

Norwegian footballer (born 1978)

Personal information
- Date of birth: 22 June 1978 (age 48)
- Place of birth: Averøy Municipality, Norway
- Position: Midfielder

Youth career
- Grykameratene IL
- 1996: Molde FK

Senior career*
Years	Team	Apps	(Gls)
1997–2008	Molde FK	186	(17)

International career
1998–1999	Norway U21	13	(0)
- * Club domestic league appearances and goals

Thomas Mork (born 22 June 1978) is a Norwegian former footballer who currently works as a coach for Molde FK's academy and as a coach for Molde 2. Mork spent his entire top-level playing career at Molde, where his primary position was on the left wing. He made his first-team debut for Molde in 1997, and played for the club until 2008, when his contract was not renewed. He was also capped 13 times by Norway U21.

== Honours ==
Molde FK

- Norwegian Cup: 2005
