= Marcus Andreasson =

Liberian footballer (born 1978)

Personal information
- Full name: Marcus Yates Andreasson
- Date of birth: July 13, 1978 (age 48)
- Place of birth: Buchanan, Liberia
- Height: 1.92 m (6 ft 4 in)
- Position: Defender

Youth career
- Kosta IF

Senior career*
Years	Team	Apps	(Gls)
1997–1998	Östers IF	12	(0)
1999	Kalmar FF	6	(0)
1999–2001	Bristol Rovers	14	(1)
2001–2003	Bryne FK	57	(5)
2004–2010	Molde FK	152	(5)
2011	Lierse	11	(0)
2012	Kosta IF	7	(0)
2012–2013	Lierse	21	(0)
- * Club domestic league appearances and goals

Marcus Yates Andreasson (born July 13, 1978) is a Liberian former professional footballer.

His preferred position was center-back, but he could also play as a midfielder and striker because of his great height and strength. Andreasson was a flexible player and could easily adjust into different roles.

== Career ==
He has played for most of his career in top clubs in Scandinavia, but has also played for clubs in the rest of Europe. He has played previously for Lierse in the Belgium Pro League, for Norwegian club Molde FK, Swedish clubs Kosta IF, Kalmar FF and Östers IF, English club Bristol Rovers, Norwegian club Bryne FK and Swedish Division 6 club Kosta IF.

== Honors ==
Molde FK

- Norwegian Cup: 2005
