= Tommy Eide Møster =

Norwegian footballer (born 1983)

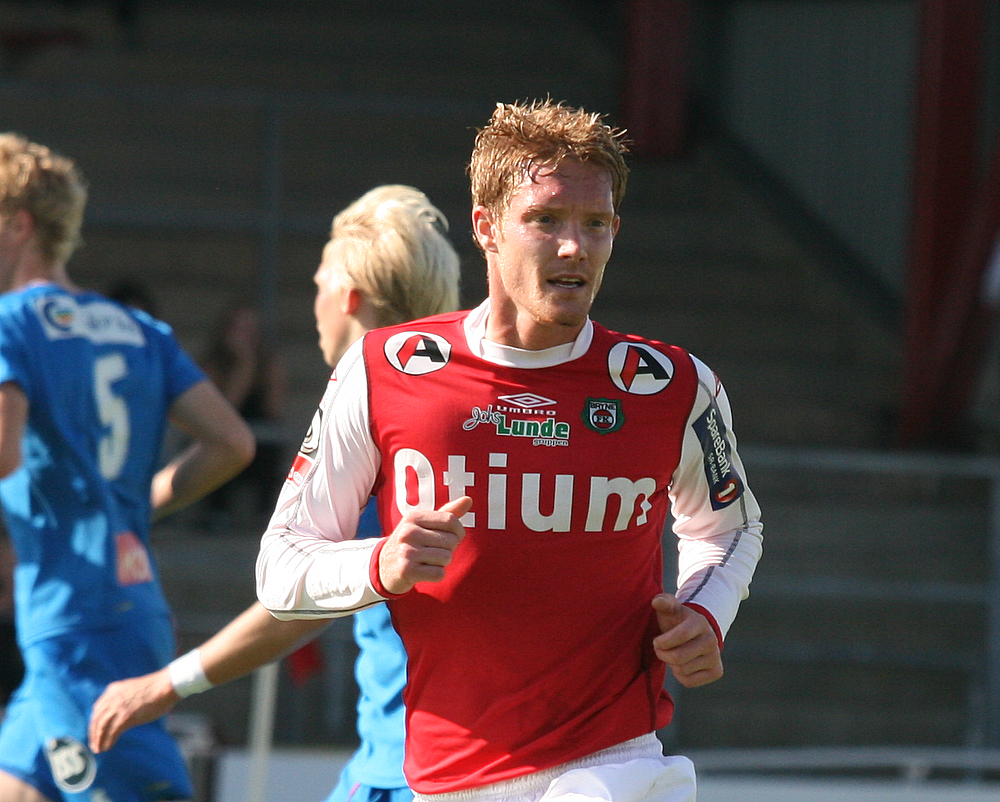
Tommy Eide Møster at Bryne Stadion 30 August 2008

Tommy Eide Møster (born 16 January 1983) is a former Norwegian professional footballer who played as a midfielder.

He played senior football for Nesset in 1999, then joined Molde FK's junior setup. He made his first-team debut in 2003 and amassed 45 league games and 7 cup games until 2007. On 29 March 2008, he moved to Bryne FK for a sum of around half a million krone. He joined Ålgård FK in 2015 and Rosseland BK in 2017.
