= Øyvind Gram =

Norwegian footballer (born 1985)

Personal information
- Full name: Øyvind Julnes Gram
- Date of birth: 11 October 1985 (age 41)
- Place of birth: Lørenskog, Norway
- Height: 1.77 m (5 ft 9 1/2 in)
- Position: Midfielder

Youth career
- Træff

Senior career*
Years	Team	Apps	(Gls)
2003–2004	Træff		
2005–2006	Molde	7	(0)
2007	→ Lyn (loan)	0	(0)
2008–2009	Aalesund	1	(0)
2010	Gefle	5	(0)
2011	Vik IL		
2012	Bergen Nord	4	(0)
- * Club domestic league appearances and goals

Øyvind Julnes Gram (born 11 October 1985) is a retired Norwegian football striker.

In 2005, he won the Norwegian Football Cup with Molde.

Gram has had many injuries and, in April 2009, was operated on for the third time in a year.

After a spell with Gefle, he returned in winter 2011 and signed for Vik IL. In July 2012 he joined FK Bergen Nord.
