= Mitja Brulc =

Slovenian footballer

Personal information
- Full name: Mitja Brulc
- Date of birth: 7 December 1979 (age 46)
- Place of birth: Novo Mesto, SFR Yugoslavia
- Height: 1.78 m (5 ft 10 in)
- Position: Forward

Youth career
- Elan
- Factor

Senior career*
| Years | Team | Apps | (Gls) |
| 1998–1999 | Factor | | (4) |
| 1999–2000 | Dravograd | 31 | (2) |
| 2000–2001 | Gorica | 29 | (0) |
| 2001–2004 | Celje | 83 | (21) |
| 2005 | Molde | 6 | (0) |
| 2005–2007 | Celje | 65 | (14) |
| 2007–2008 | Maribor | 17 | (2) |
| 2008 | → HK Kópavogs (loan) | 15 | (7) |
| 2008–2011 | Koper | 85 | (19) |
| 2012–2013 | Krka | 24 | (11) |

International career
| 1997 | Slovenia U18 | 6 | (0) |
| 2000–2001 | Slovenia U21 | 15 | (1) |
- * Club domestic league appearances and goals

Mitja Brulc (born 7 December 1979) is a retired Slovenian footballer.

Brulc had a spell in Norway with Molde and at Icelandic outfit HK Kópavogs in 2008. He joined Slovenian giants Maribor in 2007.
