= Torgeir Ruud Ramsli =

Norwegian footballer (born 1979)

Personal information
- Date of birth: 4 August 1979 (age 47)
- Place of birth: Molde, Norway
- Height: 1.81 m (5 ft 11 in)
- Positions: Defender; midfielder

Youth career
- Sunndal
- Molde

Senior career*
| Years | Team | Apps | (Gls) |
| 1999–2001 | Molde | 6 | (0) |
| 2001 | → HamKam (loan) | 2 | (0) |
| 2001–2002 | Træff | | |
| 2003–2004 | Sunndal | | |
| 2004–2005 | Molde | 6 | (0) |
| 2005–2018 | Sunndal | | |

International career
| 2000 | Norway U21 | 1 | (0) |

Managerial career
- 2016–2019: Sunndal
- * Club domestic league appearances and goals as of 2 April 2009

Torgeir Ruud Ramsli (born 4 August 1979) is a Norwegian football coach and former player. As a player, Ramsli played as a defender and midfielder for Sunndal, Molde FK, Ham-Kam and Træff.

Starting to feature for Norway's youth teams while at Sunndal, he joined Molde's youth setup and among others won the 1997 Norwegian Junior Cup. He made his league debut in 1999 and in 2000 he played five league games and two cup games.

In 2001 he was loaned out to HamKam from the onset, then spent the latter half of 2001 and the whole of 2002 in Træff. Back in Sunndal in 2003, he returned to Molde in the summer of 2004 and then to Sunndal in the summer of 2005. He played competitively for Sunndal through 2018.

Ramsli was the head coach of Sunndal from 2016, led them from the 2018 4. divisjon to the 2019 3. divisjon, but as the team was facing relegation he resigned on 30 September 2019.
