= Matej Mavrič =

Slovenian footballer (born 1979)

Personal information
- Full name: Matej Rožič Mavrič
- Date of birth: 29 January 1979 (age 47)
- Place of birth: Koper, SFR Yugoslavia
- Height: 1.87 m (6 ft 2 in)
- Position: Centre-back

Team information
- Current team: ŽNK Radomlje (head coach)

Youth career
- Piran
- Primorje

Senior career*
Years	Team	Apps	(Gls)
1997–1999	Primorje	38	(1)
2000–2004	Gorica	102	(8)
2004–2007	Molde	52	(7)
2007	→ TuS Koblenz (loan)	11	(1)
2007–2010	TuS Koblenz	90	(12)
2010–2012	Kapfenberger SV	42	(4)
2012–2013	Koper	34	(3)
Total		369	(36)

International career
1997	Slovenia U18	4	(0)
1997–1998	Slovenia U20	5	(0)
1998–2001	Slovenia U21	13	(0)
2002–2011	Slovenia	37	(1)

Managerial career
- 2022–2023: Adria
- 2024–: ŽNK Radomlje
- * Club domestic league appearances and goals

Matej Rožič Mavrič (born 29 January 1979) is a Slovenian retired international footballer who played as a centre-back.

== International career ==
Mavrič made his debut for Slovenia in 2002 and earned a total of 37 caps, scoring 1 goal.

== Honours ==
Gorica

- Slovenian Championship: 2003–04
- Slovenian Cup: 2000–01, 2001–02

Molde

- Norwegian Football Cup: 2005
