= Dag Roar Ørsal =

Norwegian footballer (born 1980)

Dag Roar Ørsal (born 20 July 1980) is a Norwegian football midfielder who currently plays for IL Hødd.

His former clubs are Ørsta IL, FK Haugesund, Molde FK and Aalesunds FK.
