= Lars Ivar Moldskred =

Norwegian footballer (born 1978)

Personal information
- Full name: Lars Ivar Moldskred
- Date of birth: 12 November 1978 (age 47)
- Place of birth: Tjørvåg, Norway
- Height: 1.94 m (6 ft 4 in)
- Position: Goalkeeper

Youth career
- Tjørvåg
- Bergsøy

Senior career*
| Years | Team | Apps | (Gls) |
| 2000–2004 | Hødd | 142 | (1) |
| 2004–2007 | Molde | 22 | (0) |
| 2007–2009 | Lillestrøm | 0 | (0) |
| 2009–2010 | → Strømsgodset (loan) | 26 | (0) |
| 2010 | KR Reykjavik | 21 | (0) |
- * Club domestic league appearances and goals as of 27 July 2012

Lars Ivar Moldskred (born 12 November 1978) is a football goalkeeper who have played professional for Hødd, Molde, Lillestrøm, Strømsgodset and KR Reykjavik.

== Club career ==
Moldskred started his professional career in IL Hødd, where he spent 4 seasons and played 142 matches. He scored one goal for Hødd during his stay there.

In 2004, he moved to Molde FK. He played 22 matches for them, before moving to Lillestrøm SK. He was not regarded as the first choice there, and was out on loan to Strømsgodset in the 2009 season.

He signed for KR Reykjavik until the end of the 2010 season, after Lillestrøm refused to renew his contract, and he left the club as a free agent.

After one year in Iceland, Moldskred joined his youth club Bergsøy IL as goalkeeper coach.
