= 2018 Molde FK season =

Molde
2018 season
- Chairman: Odd Ivar Moen
- Manager: Ole Gunnar Solskjær
- Stadium: Aker Stadion
- Eliteserien: 2nd
- Norwegian Cup: Second Round vs Brattvåg
- Europa League: Play-off Round vs Zenit St. Petersburg
- Top goalscorer: League: Erling Haaland (12); All: Erling Haaland (16)
- Highest home attendance: 9,444 vs Rosenborg (30 September 2018)
- Lowest home attendance: 4,179 vs Laçi (26 July 2018)
- Average home league attendance: 7,111
Home colours	Away colours	Third colours

The 2018 season was Molde's 11th consecutive year in the top flight, Eliteserien, and their 42nd season in the top flight of Norwegian football. They competed in Eliteserien, the Cup and the 2018–19 UEFA Europa League, which they entered at the First qualifying round stage.

In the Norwegian Cup, Molde advanced from the first round on 18 April 2018 after Træff was defeated with the score 1–6. Daniel Chima Chukwu scored a hat-trick in the game. Molde were drawn against Brattvåg in the second round. Molde lost the game 0–1 in extra time after 90 goalless minutes.

== Season events ==
Ahead of the 2018 season, first team coach Mark Dempsey left Molde on 1 December 2017 to become the new head coach of IK Start.

== Squad ==
As of match played 24 November 2018

No.	Name	Nationality	Position	Date of birth (age)	Signed from	Signed in	Contract ends	Apps.	Goals
Goalkeepers
1	Andreas Linde	(Sweden)	GK	24 July 1993 (aged 25)	Helsingborg	2015	2019	88	0
12	Álex Craninx	(Belgium)	GK	21 October 1995 (aged 23)	Cartagena	2018	2021	0	0
26	Mathias Ranmark	(Norway)	GK	16 October 1995 (aged 23)	Oppsal	2017	2018	3	0
46	Hermann Ræstad	(Norway)	GK	6 January 2000 (aged 18)	Academy			0	0
Defenders
2	Isak Ssewankambo	(Sweden)	DF	27 February 1996 (aged 22)	Derby County	2016	2018	37	0
3	Christopher Telo	(Sweden)	DF	4 November 1989 (aged 29)	IFK Norrköping	2017	2020	6	0
4	Ruben Gabrielsen	(Norway)	DF	10 March 1992 (aged 26)	Lillestrøm	2014	2019	137	5
5	Vegard Forren	(Norway)	DF	16 February 1988 (aged 30)	Brighton & Hove Albion	2017	2019	355	17
6	Stian Rode Gregersen	(Norway)	DF	17 May 1995 (aged 23)	Academy	2013	2020	56	1
22	Christoffer Remmer	(Denmark)	DF	16 January 1993 (aged 25)	Copenhagen	2016	2019	74	0
28	Kristoffer Haugen	(Norway)	DF	21 February 1994 (aged 24)	Viking	2018	2020	34	2
38	Simen Bakkemyr Hagbø	(Norway)	DF	3 May 1999 (aged 19)	Academy	2018		1	0
39	Elias Mordal	(Norway)	DF	20 January 1998 (aged 20)	Academy	2015		0	0
50	Thor-Olav Moe	(Norway)	DF	5 October 1999 (aged 19)	Academy			0	0
55	Andreas Uranium	(Norway)	DF	1 February 2000 (aged 18)	Academy			0	0
58	Emil Breivik	(Norway)	DF	11 June 2000 (aged 18)	Academy			0	0
Midfielders
7	Magnus Wolff Eikrem	(Norway)	MF	8 August 1990 (aged 28)	Seattle Sounders	2018	2022	103	15
8	Babacar Sarr	(Senegal)	MF	15 February 1991 (aged 27)	Sogndal	2016	2019	78	6
9	Mattias Moström	(Sweden)	MF	25 February 1983 (aged 35)	AIK	2007	2018	330	35
11	Martin Ellingsen	(Norway)	MF	2 May 1995 (aged 23)	Kongsvinger	2017	2020	13	3
14	Petter Strand	(Norway)	MF	24 August 1994 (aged 24)	Sogndal	2016	2018	88	10
16	Etzaz Hussain	(Norway)	MF	27 January 1993 (aged 25)	Rudeš	2017	2019	164	17
17	Fredrik Aursnes	(Norway)	MF	10 December 1995 (aged 22)	Hødd	2016	2019	94	14
19	Eirik Hestad	(Norway)	MF	26 June 1995 (aged 23)	Academy	2012	2019	131	20
46	Hermann Svendsen	(Norway)	MF	13 May 1999 (aged 19)	Academy			0	0
59	Tobias Hestad	(Norway)	MF	29 December 2000 (aged 17)	Academy			0	0
Forwards
10	Leke James	(Nigeria)	FW	1 November 1992 (aged 26)	Free agent	2018	2020	14	4
20	Thomas Amang	(Cameroon)	FW	9 February 1998 (aged 20)	Rainbow Bamenda	2016	2020	50	11
24	Paweł Cibicki	(Sweden)	FW	4 January 1994 (aged 24)	loan from Leeds United	2018	2018	17	3
27	Daniel Chima Chukwu	(Nigeria)	FW	4 April 1991 (aged 27)	Legia Warszawa	2018	2020	163	56
30	Erling Haaland	(Norway)	FW	21 July 2000 (aged 18)	Bryne	2017		48	19
47	Christian Dahl	(Norway)	FW	26 May 1999 (aged 19)	Academy			0	0
49	Sivert Gussiås	(Norway)	FW	18 August 1999 (aged 19)	Academy	2018	2019	1	0
54	Henrik Jenset	(Norway)	FW	22 January 2000 (aged 18)	Academy			0	0
56	William Røsok	(Norway)	FW	31 March 2000 (aged 18)	Academy			0	0
	Magnus Langset	(Norway)	FW	8 May 1999 (aged 19)	Academy			0	0
Out on loan
13	Ibrahima Wadji	(Senegal)	FW	5 May 1995 (aged 23)	Gazişehir Gaziantep	2017	2020	17	4
15	Sonni Nattestad	(Faroe Islands)	DF	5 August 1994 (aged 24)	FH	2016	2019	0	0
21	Tobias Svendsen	(Norway)	MF	31 August 1999 (aged 19)	Academy	2015	2020	23	1
25	Óttar Magnús Karlsson	(Iceland)	FW	21 February 1997 (aged 21)	Vikingur Reykjavik	2017	2019	11	1
27	Martin Ove Roseth	(Norway)	DF	10 July 1998 (aged 20)	Academy	2016	2021	2	0
33	Fredrik Brustad	(Norway)	FW	22 June 1989 (aged 29)	AIK	2016	2019	62	15
	Agnaldo	(Brazil)	MF	11 March 1994 (aged 24)	Desportivo Brasil	2014	2018	70	9
Players who left club during season
7	Mathias Normann	(Norway)	MF	28 May 1996 (aged 22)	loan from Brighton & Hove Albion	2017	2018	18	1
18	Leo Skiri Østigård	(Norway)	DF	28 November 1999 (aged 18)	Academy	2017	2020	1	0
48	Thomas Nerland	(Norway)	MF	2 July 1999 (aged 19)	Academy			0	0
52	Erik Iversen	(Norway)	GK	14 December 1999 (aged 18)	Academy			0	0

== Transfers ==
=== In ===
Date	Position	Nationality	Name	From	Fee	Ref.
1 January 2018	GK	(Brazil)	Neydson	Elverum	Loan Return	
1 January 2018	DF	(Norway)	Ole Martin Rindarøy	Sogndal	Loan Return	
1 January 2018	MF	(Norway)	Etzaz Hussain	Odd	Loan Return	
1 January 2018	MF	(Norway)	Kristian Strande	Brattvåg	Loan Return	
1 January 2018	MF	(Brazil)	Agnaldo	Vila Nova	Loan Return	
10 January 2018	DF	(Norway)	Kristoffer Haugen	Viking	Undisclosed	
14 February 2018	FW	(Nigeria)	Daniel Chima Chukwu	Legia Warsaw	Undisclosed	
30 April 2018	FW	(Nigeria)	Leke James	Free Agent	Free	
17 July 2018†	MF	(Norway)	Erling Knudtzon	Lillestrøm	Undisclosed	
25 July 2018	MF	(Norway)	Magnus Wolff Eikrem	Seattle Sounders	Undisclosed	
27 July 2018	GK	(Belgium)	Álex Craninx	Cartagena	Free	

† Knudtzon's moves was announced on the above date, but was finalised on 1 January 2019.

=== Out ===
Date	Position	Nationality	Name	To	Fee	Ref.
24 November 2017	MF	(Norway)	Ola Ormset Husby	Brattvåg	Undisclosed	
4 December 2017	DF	(Finland)	Roni Peiponen	HJK Helsinki	Undisclosed	
1 January 2018	GK	(Brazil)	Neydson	Brattvåg	Undisclosed	
5 January 2018	FW	(Iceland)	Björn Bergmann Sigurðarson	Rostov	Undisclosed	
31 January 2018	DF	(Norway)	Ole Martin Rindarøy	Sogndal	Undisclosed	
1 February 2018	DF	(Finland)	Joona Toivio	Bruk-Bet Termalica Nieciecza	Undisclosed	
2 February 2018	FW	(Norway)	Adnan Dudić	Brattvåg	Undisclosed	
10 February 2018	DF	(Norway)	Kristian Strande	Egersund	Undisclosed	
10 February 2018	GK	(Norway)	Jonatan Strand Byttingsvik	Levanger	Undisclosed	
1 June 2018	MF	(Norway)	Eman Markovic	Zrinjski Mostar	Undisclosed	
26 June 2018	DF	(Norway)	Thomas Nerland	Kristiansund	Undisclosed	
1 August 2018	MF	(Norway)	Mikael Wenaas	Kristiansund	Undisclosed	
15 August 2018	DF	(Norway)	Leo Skiri Østigård	Brighton & Hove Albion	Undisclosed	
23 August 2018	GK	(Norway)	Erik Iversen	Sunndal	Undisclosed	

=== Loans in ===
Date from	Position	Nationality	Name	From	Date to	Ref.
26 January 2018	MF	(Norway)	Mathias Normann	Brighton & Hove Albion	Summer 2018	
3 July 2018	FW	(Sweden)	Paweł Cibicki	Leeds United	End of Season	

=== Loans out ===
Date from	Position	Nationality	Name	to	Date to	Ref.
30 January 2018	MF	(Brazil)	Agnaldo	RoPS	31 December 2018	
15 February 2018	DF	(Norway)	Martin Ove Roseth	Levanger	31 December 2018	
28 February 2018	FW	(Iceland)	Óttar Magnús Karlsson	Trelleborg	31 December 2018	
1 March 2018	DF	(Faroe Islands)	Sonni Nattestad	Aalesund	Summer 2018	
13 March 2018	DF	(Norway)	Leo Skiri Østigård	Viking	15 August 2018	
19 March 2018	DF	(Sweden)	Isak Ssewankambo	Malmö	20 July 2018	
26 July 2018	MF	(Senegal)	Ibrahima Wadji	Haugesund	31 December 2018	
15 August 2018	MF	(Norway)	Tobias Svendsen	Haugesund	31 December 2018	
31 August 2018	FW	(Norway)	Fredrik Brustad	Hamilton Academical	31 May 2019	
31 August 2018	DF	(Faroe Islands)	Sonni Nattestad	AC Horsens	31 December 2018	

=== Released ===
Date	Position	Nationality	Name	Joined	Date	Ref.
29 November 2017	DF	(Norway)	Knut Olav Rindarøy	Retired		

== Friendlies ==
20 January 2018	Molde (Norway)	3–2	(Spain) Seleccion AFC
??:?? UTC (UTC+1)	Brustad 14'; E.Hestad 16'; Brustad 18'	Report	Unknown (?); Unknown 80'

2 February 2018	Molde	1–2	Bodø/Glimt	Molde
14:00 UTC (UTC+1)	Strand 56'	Report	Saltnes 36'; Hauge 49'	Stadium: Aker Stadion

9 February 2018	Lillestrøm	2–1	Molde	Lillestrøm
16:00 UTC (UTC+1)	Knudtzon 23'; Martin 72'	Report	Hussain 28'	Stadium: LSK-Hallen

14 February 2018	Molde	1–0	Kristiansund	Molde
14:00 UTC (UTC+1)	Amang 16'	Report		Stadium: Aker Stadion

18 February 2018	Molde (Norway)	1–2	(Russia) Krasnodar	Marbella
16:30 UTC (UTC+1)	Aursnes 49'	Report	Claesson 41'; Smolov 87'	Stadium: Marbella Football Center

22 February 2018	Molde	1–1	Vålerenga	Marbella
18:00 UTC (UTC+1)	Hussain 26'	Report	Grødem 69'	Stadium: Dame De Noche

25 February 2018	Molde (Norway)	4–1	(Belarus) Dynamo Brest	Marbella
18:00 UTC (UTC+1)	Amang 38', 55', 63'; Brustad 62'	Report	9'	Stadium: Coin

3 March 2018	Molde	1–0	Aalesund	Molde
15:00 UTC (UTC+1)	Chima 10'	Report		Stadium: Aker Stadion

23 March 2018	Molde	1–1	Ranheim	Molde
16:00 UTC (UTC+1)	Wadji 4'	Report	Reginiussen 40'	Stadium: Aker Stadion

27 March 2018	Molde	3–1	Hødd	Molde
14:00 UTC (UTC+1)	Chima 1'; Wadji 47'; Normann 51'	Report	Osvold 70'	Stadium: Aker Stadion; Referee: Marius Grøtta, Malmefjorden IL

== Competitions ==
=== Eliteserien ===
==== Results summary ====
Overall								Home						Away					
Pld	W	D	L	GF	GA	GD	Pts	W	D	L	GF	GA	GD	W	D	L	GF	GA	GD
30	18	5	7	63	36	+27	59	11	1	3	38	15	+23	7	4	4	25	21	+4

Last updated: 24 November 2018.
Source: see below

==== Results by round ====
Round	1	2	3	4	5	6	7	8	9	10	11	12	13	14	15	16	17	18	19	20	21	22	23	24	25	26	27	28	29	30
Ground	H	A	H	A	H	A	H	A	H	H	A	H	A	H	A	H	A	H	A	H	A	H	A	H	A	H	A	A	H	A
Result	W	W	W	L	W	D	L	D	L	W	L	W	L	W	W	W	D	W	L	L	D	W	W	W	W	D	W	W	W	W
Position	1	1	1	2	2	2	3	3	6	6	8	7	8	6	4	3	4	4	4	5	4	4	3	3	3	3	3	3	2	2

Updated to match(es) played on 24 November 2018. Source: see below
A = Away; H = Home; W = Win; D = Draw; L = Loss

==== Results ====
11 March 2018 1	Molde	5–0	Sandefjord	Molde
18:00 CET (UTC+1)	Aursnes 23' (pen.); Brustad 36'; Amang 57'; Forren (yellow card) 59'; E.Hestad 63'; Strand 65'	Report	Kane (yellow card) 23'; Vallès (yellow card) 29'; Kastrati (yellow card) 32'	Stadium: Aker Stadion; Attendance: 6,218; Referee: Ola Hobber Nilsen

17 March 2018 2	Haugesund	0–1	Molde	Haugesund
18:00 CET (UTC+1)		Report	Aursnes 9'; Normann (yellow card) 85'	Stadium: Haugesund Stadion; Attendance: 3,820; Referee: Tore Hansen

2 April 2018 3	Molde	2–1	Tromsø	Molde
18:00 CEST (UTC+2)	Hussain 22', 28'; Forren (yellow card) 50'; E.Hestad (yellow card) 53'	Report	Taylor 43'; Pedersen (yellow card) 56'	Stadium: Aker Stadion; Attendance: 6,438; Referee: Trond Ivar Døvle

8 April 2018 4	Rosenborg	4–0	Molde	Trondheim
20:00 CEST (UTC+2)	Bendtner 20', 69'; Søderlund 30' (yellow card) 78'; Konradsen 52'	Report	Haugen (yellow card) 38'; Gabrielsen (yellow card) 78'	Stadium: Lerkendal Stadion; Attendance: 16,154; Referee: Kai Erik Steen

15 April 2018 5	Molde	2–1	Lillestrøm	Molde
18:00 CEST (UTC+2)	Haaland 41' (pen.); Hussain (yellow card) 45'; Aursnes (yellow card) 45'; Wadji 90+2'	Report	Krogstad 25' (yellow card) 57'; Brenden (yellow card) 45+1'	Stadium: Aker Stadion; Attendance: 7,411; Referee: Svein Oddvar Moen

22 April 2018 6	Vålerenga	0–0	Molde	Oslo
20:00 CEST (UTC+2)	Lekven (yellow card) 48'	Report	Moström (yellow card) 25'; E.Hestad (yellow card) 58'; Aursnes (yellow card) 75'	Stadium: Intility Arena; Attendance: 8,436; Referee: Dag Vidar Hafsås

29 April 2018 7	Molde	0–1	Odd	Molde
18:00 CEST (UTC+2)	Gregersen (yellow card) 44'	Report	Nordkvelle 36'	Stadium: Aker Stadion; Attendance: 6,793; Referee: Tommy Skjerven

7 May 2018 8	Sarpsborg 08	2–2	Molde	Sarpsborg
19:00 CEST (UTC+2)	Agger 1', 25' (pen.)	Report	Haaland 8'; Forren (yellow card) 24'; Normann 29', (red card) 71'; Sarr (yellow card) 45'	Stadium: Sarpsborg Stadion; Attendance: 4,842; Referee: Ola Hobber Nilsen

13 May 2018 9	Molde	1–2	Bodø/Glimt	Molde
18:00 CEST (UTC+2)	E.Hestad 44'; Aursnes (yellow card) 66'	Report	Zinckernagel 68'; Ricardo (yellow card) 90+1'; Opseth 90+4'	Stadium: Aker Stadion; Attendance: 6,768; Referee: Espen Andreas Eskås

16 May 2018 10	Molde	2–0	Strømsgodset	Molde
18:00 CEST (UTC+2)	Gabrielsen 56' (yellow card) 70'; Moström (yellow card) 59'; E.Hestad 79'	Report	Pedersen (yellow card) 66'	Stadium: Aker Stadion; Attendance: 6,770; Referee: Trond Ivar Døvle

21 May 2018 11	Ranheim	3–1	Molde	Trondheim
18:00 CEST (UTC+2)	Reginiussen 49' (yellow card) 69'; Riksvold 60'; Witry (yellow card) 61'; Karlsen (yellow card) 74' (goal) 75'; Helmersen (yellow card) 84'	Report	Sarr 23'; Hussain (yellow card) 85'	Stadium: EXTRA Arena; Attendance: 2,655; Referee: Kristoffer Hagenes

27 May 2018 12	Molde	3–1	Start	Molde
18:00 CEST (UTC+2)	Hussain 23' (yellow card) 45'; Chukwu 53' (yellow card) 90'; Aursnes 88'; Sarr (yellow card) 90+2'	Report	Christensen (yellow card) 27'; Afeez 33'; Finnbogason (yellow card) 45'	Stadium: Aker Stadion; Attendance: 6,335; Referee: Trygve Kjensli

9 June 2018 13	Kristiansund	1–0	Molde	Kristiansund
18:00 CEST (UTC+2)	Baranov (yellow card) 55'; Aasmundsen 57'; Sørmo (yellow card) 76'	Report	Hussain (yellow card) 27'; Normann (yellow card) 86'	Stadium: Kristiansund Stadion; Attendance: 4,277; Referee: Tom Harald Hagen

23 June 2018 14	Molde	3–0	Stabæk	Molde
18:00 CEST (UTC+2)	Aursnes 10'; E.Hestad 14'; Moström 89'	Report	Vetlesen (yellow card) 75'	Stadium: Aker Stadion; Attendance: 6,294; Referee: Tommy Skjerven

1 July 2018 15	Brann	0–4	Molde	Bergen
18:00 CEST (UTC+2)	Wormgoor (yellow card) 20'	Report	Haaland 4', 13', 15', 21' (pen.); Aursnes (yellow card) 45+1'; Gregersen (yellow card) 90'	Stadium: Brann Stadion; Attendance: 11,371; Referee: Trond Ivar Døvle

8 July 2018 16	Molde	5–1	Vålerenga	Molde
20:00 CEST (UTC+2)	Moström 5'; Haaland 20', 57'; Sarr 27' (yellow card) 28'; Chima 71'	Report	Finne 31'; Ibrahim (yellow card) 45+1' (yellow-red card) 80'; Tollås (yellow card) 52'	Stadium: Aker Stadion; Attendance: 7,012; Referee: Kai Erik Steen

5 August 2018 17	Lillestrøm	2–2	Molde	Lillestrøm
20:00 CEST (UTC+2)	Smárason 17'; Mathew (yellow card) 29'; Knudtzon (yellow card) 34'; Olsen 87'; Martin (yellow card) 89'	Report	Aursnes 37'; Gabrielsen (yellow card) 44'; Hussain 64'	Stadium: Åråsen Stadion; Attendance: 4,529; Referee: Kai Erik Steen

12 August 2018 18	Molde	5–1	Brann	Molde
18:00 CEST (UTC+2)	Haaland 3' (pen.); Cibicki 20' (yellow card) 47'; Aursnes 25', 69'; Forren (yellow card) 50'; Haugen 78'	Report	Şahin-Radlinger (yellow card) 2'; Skålevik 45+2'; Haugen (yellow card) 51'	Stadium: Aker Stadion; Attendance: 7,640; Referee: Ola Hobber Nilsen

19 August 2018 19	Stabæk	3–1	Molde	Bærum
18:00 CEST (UTC+2)	Demidov 7'; Boli 42', 55'; Keita (yellow card) 58'; Omoijuanfo (yellow card) 66'	Report	E.Hestad 66'	Stadium: Nadderud Stadion; Attendance: 4,501; Referee: Rohit Saggi

26 August 2018 20	Molde	2–3	Ranheim	Molde
18:00 CEST (UTC+2)	E.Hestad 58'; Aursnes (yellow card) 76'; Chukwu 90+2'	Report	Karlsen 56'; Helmersen 84'; Tønne 86'; Witry (yellow card) 90+2'	Stadium: Aker Stadion; Attendance: 6,864; Referee: Trygve Kjensli

2 September 2018 21	Odd	1–1	Molde	Skien
18:00 CEST (UTC+2)	Ruud 68'	Report	Broberg 17' (o.g.); Ssewankambo (yellow card) 64'	Stadium: Skagerak Arena; Attendance: 5,289; Referee: Svein Oddvar Moen

16 September 2018 22	Molde	3–2	Kristiansund	Molde
19:00 CEST (UTC+2)	Sarr 12', 51'; Forren (yellow card) 39'; Eikrem 56'; Remmer (yellow card) 81'	Report	Kastrati 26' (yellow card) 64'; Diop (yellow card) 70'; Bye 71'	Stadium: Aker Stadion; Attendance: 7,911; Referee: Trond Ivar Døvle

23 September 2018 23	Strømsgodset	1–2	Molde	Drammen
18:00 CEST (UTC+2)	Ovenstad (yellow card) 18'; Nguen 21'; Pedersen (yellow card) 90+3'	Report	Haaland 11'; Hestad 17'; Sarr (yellow card) 51'	Stadium: Marienlyst Stadion; Attendance: 7,084; Referee: Espen Eskås

30 September 2018 24	Molde	1–0	Rosenborg	Molde
20:00 CEST (UTC+2)	Hestad (yellow card) 38'; Forren 40'	Report	Gersbach (yellow card) 27'; Jensen (yellow card) 65'	Stadium: Aker Stadion; Attendance: 9,444; Referee: Ola Hobber Nilsen

7 October 2018 25	Bodø/Glimt	0–1	Molde	Bodø
18:00 CEST (UTC+2)	Ángel (yellow card) 89'; Isidoro (yellow card) 90+3'	Report	Haaland 55', (yellow card) 82'; Remmer (yellow card) 88'; Hussain (yellow card) 89'; Sarr (yellow card) 90+1'	Stadium: Aspmyra Stadion; Attendance: 2,781; Referee: Kristoffer Hagenes

20 October 2018 26	Molde	2–2	Sarpsborg 08	Molde
15:30 CEST (UTC+2)	Aursnes 18'; Haaland 76'	Report	Horn 26'; Mortensen 29'; Vasyutin (yellow card) 90+1'	Stadium: Aker Stadion; Attendance: 8,122; Referee: Dag Vidar Hafsås

29 October 2018 27	Start	1–3	Molde	Kristiansand
19:00 CET (UTC+1)	Akinyemi 42'; Larsen (yellow card) 75'	Report	Eikrem (yellow card) 27', (goal) 61'; Cibicki 54'; Hestad 90+2'	Stadium: Sør Arena; Attendance: 6,425; Referee: Trond Ivar Døvle

4 November 2018 28	Tromsø	2–4	Molde	Tromsø
18:00 CET (UTC+1)	Valakari 28', (yellow card) 84'; Taylor 67', (yellow card) 84'	Report	Hussain 20'; Aursnes 36'; Eikrem 57'; Cibicki 90+2'	Stadium: Alfheim Stadion; Attendance: 3,130; Referee: Kai Erik Steen

11 November 2018 29	Molde	2–0	Haugesund	Molde
18:00 CET (UTC+1)	James 2'; Haugen 53'	Report	Knudsen (yellow card) 16'	Stadium: Aker Stadion; Attendance: 6,641; Referee: Tommy Skjerven

24 November 2018 30	Sandefjord	1–3	Molde	Sandefjord
18:00 CET (UTC+1)	Storbæk 8'; Morer (yellow card) 18'; Rufo (yellow card) 39'	Report	Haugen (yellow card) 39'; Eikrem (yellow card) 45+1', (goal) 75'; James 49', 72'	Stadium: Komplett Arena; Attendance: 2,564; Referee: Espen Andreas Eskås

==== Table ====
Pos	Team	Pld	W	D	L	GF	GA	GD	Pts	Qualification or relegation
1	Rosenborg (C)	30	19	7	4	51	24	+27	64	Qualification for the Champions League first qualifying round (Note: Since the winners of the 2018 Norwegian Cup (Rosenborg) qualified for European competition based on league position, the spot awarded to the cup winners (Europa League first qualifying round) was passed to the second-placed team, while the spot awarded to the second-placed team (Europa League first qualifying round) was passed to the fourth-placed team.)
2	Molde	30	18	5	7	63	36	+27	59	Qualification for the Europa League first qualifying round
3	Brann	30	17	7	6	45	31	+14	58	Qualification for the Europa League first qualifying round
4	Haugesund	30	16	5	9	45	33	+12	53	Qualification for the Europa League first qualifying round
5	Kristiansund	30	13	7	10	46	41	+5	46	

Source: Football Association of Norway (in Norwegian), Soccerway
Rules for classification: 1) Points; 2) Goal difference; 3) Goals scored; 4) Head-to-head points; 5) Head-to-head goal difference; 6) Head-to-head away goals scored (only if between two teams); 7) Head-to-head goals scored; 8) Play-off (only used to decide champions or relegation).
(C) Champions

=== Norwegian Cup ===
18 April 2018 First round	Træff	1–6	Molde	Molde
18:00 CEST (UTC+2)	O.Eloranta (yellow card) 24'; A.Jonassen 46'; H.Hamoudi (yellow card) 85'	Report	Chukwu 7', 63', 90'; Wadji 12', 26'; Brustad 14'; Svendsen (yellow card) 37'; Aursnes (yellow card) 55'	Stadium: Reknesbanen; Attendance: 600; Referee: Mads Skarsem

2 May 2018 Second round	Brattvåg	1–0 (a.e.t.)	Molde	Brattvåg
18:00 CEST (UTC+2)	H.Leine (yellow card) 35'; Dahle (yellow card) 53'; Stensøe 106'; O.Husby (yellow card) 107'	Report	Strand (yellow card) 74'	Stadium: Brattvåg stadion Attendance: 1,010; Referee: Jan Morten Tennøy

=== Europa League ===
==== Qualifying phase ====
11 July 2018 1st qualifying round 1st leg	Glenavon (Northern Ireland)	2–1	(Norway) Molde	Lurgan, Northern Ireland
20:45 CEST (UTC+2)	Marshall 37'; N.Grace (yellow card) 51'; Daniels 60'; A.Doyle (yellow card) 89'	Report	E.Hestad 36'; Gabrielsen (yellow card) 72'; Chima (yellow card) 89'	Stadium: Mourneview Park; Attendance: 631; Referee: Mads-Kristoffer Kristoffersen (Denmark)

19 July 2018 1st qualifying round 2nd leg	Molde (Norway)	5–1 (6–3 agg.)	(Northern Ireland) Glenavon	Molde, Norway
17:00 CEST (UTC+2)	Hussain 29' (pen.); E.Hestad 34', 59', 90'; Sarr (yellow card) 61' (goal) 90+4'	Report	S.Donnelly (yellow card) 42'; Forren 62' (o.g.); A.Doyle (yellow card) 90+3'	Stadium: Aker Stadion; Attendance: 5,150; Referee: Alexandru Tean (Moldova)

26 July 2018 2nd qualifying round 1st leg	Molde (Norway)	3–0	(Albania) Laçi	Molde, Norway
19:00 CEST (UTC+2)	Haaland 6' (pen.); E.Hestad 24'; James 79'	Report	Sefgjinaj (yellow card) 5'; Radaš (yellow card) 66'	Stadium: Aker Stadion; Attendance: 4,179; Referee: Adrien Jaccottet (Switzerland)

2 August 2018 2nd qualifying round 2nd leg	Laçi (Albania)	0–2 (0–5 agg.)	(Norway) Molde	Laç, Albania
17:00 CEST (UTC+2)	Radaš (yellow card) 40'	Report	Aursnes 41' (pen.); Strand 45'	Stadium: Laçi Stadium; Attendance: 420; Referee: Kristo Tohver (Estonia)

9 August 2018 3rd qualifying round 1st leg	Hibernian (Scotland)	0–0	(Norway) Molde	Edinburgh, Scotland
20:45 CEST (UTC+2)	Porteous (yellow card) 48'	Report	Hussain (yellow card) 55'; Gregersen (yellow card) 63'; Forren (yellow card) 90+4'	Stadium: Easter Road; Attendance: 16,339; Referee: Ádám Farkas (Hungary)

16 August 2018 3rd qualifying round 2nd leg	Molde (Norway)	3–0 (3–0 agg.)	(Scotland) Hibernian	Molde, Norway
19:00 CEST (UTC+2)	Haaland 35', 82'; Aursnes 66'; Gregersen (yellow card) 68'	Report	Porteous (yellow card) 11'; Ambrose (yellow card) 44'; Boyle (yellow card) 75'	Stadium: Aker Stadion; Attendance: 5,554; Referee: Dennis Higler (Netherlands)

23 August 2018 Playoff round 1st leg	Zenit Saint Petersburg (Russia)	3–1	(Norway) Molde	Saint Petersburg, Russia
18:00 CEST (UTC+2)	Smolnikov (yellow card) 61'; Dzyuba 71'; Zabolotny 80'; Hernani (yellow card) 87'; Mevlja 90'	Report	Forren (yellow card) 31'; E.Hestad (yellow card) 38' (goal) 42'	Stadium: Krestovsky Stadium; Attendance: 40,677; Referee: Deniz Aytekin (Germany)

30 August 2018 Playoff round 2nd leg	Molde (Norway)	2–1 (3–4 agg.)	(Russia) Zenit Saint Petersburg	Molde, Norway
19:00 CEST (UTC+2)	Hestad 65'; Haaland (yellow card) 75' (goal) 77'; Forren (yellow card) 89'	Report	Kuzyayev 21'	Stadium: Aker Stadion; Referee: Carlos del Cerro Grande (Spain)

== Squad statistics ==
=== Appearances and goals ===
As of match played 24 November 2018

No.	Pos	Nat	Player	Total		Eliteserien		Norwegian Cup		Europa League	
No.	Pos	Nat	Player	Apps	Goals	Apps	Goals	Apps	Goals	Apps	Goals
1	GK	(Sweden) SWE	Andreas Linde	38	0	29	0	1	0	8	0
2	DF	(Sweden) SWE	Isak Ssewankambo	5	0	0+4	0	0	0	0+1	0
3	DF	(Sweden) SWE	Christopher Telo	4	0	2	0	2	0	0	0
4	DF	(Norway) NOR	Ruben Gabrielsen	34	1	24+1	1	1	0	8	0
5	DF	(Norway) NOR	Vegard Forren	35	1	26	1	1	0	8	0
6	DF	(Norway) NOR	Stian Rode Gregersen	19	0	8+5	0	1	0	3+2	0
7	MF	(Norway) NOR	Magnus Wolff Eikrem	20	4	12+2	4	0	0	2+4	0
8	MF	(Senegal) SEN	Babacar Sarr	36	5	22+5	4	1+1	0	7	1
9	MF	(Sweden) SWE	Mattias Moström	22	2	8+10	2	1	0	2+1	0
10	FW	(Nigeria) NGR	Leke James	14	4	5+4	3	0	0	0+5	1
14	MF	(Norway) NOR	Petter Strand	35	2	14+12	1	1	0	5+3	1
16	MF	(Norway) NOR	Etzaz Hussain	32	6	21+2	5	2	0	7	1
17	MF	(Norway) NOR	Fredrik Aursnes	37	10	23+6	8	1	0	6+1	2
19	MF	(Norway) NOR	Eirik Hestad	38	15	29+1	8	0+1	0	7	7
20	FW	(Cameroon) CMR	Thomas Amang	7	1	5+2	1	0	0	0	0
22	DF	(Denmark) DEN	Christoffer Remmer	32	0	22+2	0	2	0	6	0
24	FW	(Sweden) SWE	Paweł Cibicki	18	3	11+2	3	0	0	2+3	0
26	GK	(Norway) NOR	Mathias Ranmark	2	0	1	0	1	0	0	0
27	FW	(Nigeria) NGR	Daniel Chima Chukwu	17	6	4+7	3	2	3	3+1	0
28	DF	(Norway) NOR	Kristoffer Haugen	34	2	26	2	0	0	8	0
30	FW	(Norway) NOR	Erling Haaland	30	16	17+8	12	0	0	5	4
38	DF	(Norway) NOR	Simen Hagbø	1	0	0	0	0+1	0	0	0
43	FW	(Norway) NOR	Sivert Gussiås	1	0	0	0	0+1	0	0	0
Players away from Molde on loan:
13	MF	(Senegal) SEN	Ibrahima Wadji	7	3	0+4	1	2	2	0+1	0
21	MF	(Norway) NOR	Tobias Svendsen	10	0	1+6	0	2	0	0+1	0
33	FW	(Norway) NOR	Fredrik Brustad	21	3	11+5	2	1+1	1	1+2	0
Players who appeared for Molde no longer at the club:
7	MF	(Norway) NOR	Mathias Normann	12	1	8+2	1	1+1	0	0	0

=== Goalscorers ===
As of match played 24 November 2018

Rank	Pos.	No.	Nat.	Player	Eliteserien	Norwegian Cup	Europa League	Total
1	FW	30	(Norway)	Erling Haaland	12	0	4	16
2	MF	19	(Norway)	Eirik Hestad	8	0	7	15
3	MF	17	(Norway)	Fredrik Aursnes	8	0	2	10
4	MF	16	(Norway)	Etzaz Hussain	5	0	1	6
4	FW	27	(Nigeria)	Daniel Chima Chukwu	3	3	0	6
6	MF	8	(Senegal)	Babacar Sarr	4	0	1	5
7	MF	7	(Norway)	Magnus Wolff Eikrem	4	0	0	4
7	FW	10	(Nigeria)	Leke James	3	0	1	4
9	FW	24	(Sweden)	Paweł Cibicki	3	0	0	3
9	FW	33	(Norway)	Fredrik Brustad	2	1	0	3
9	MF	13	(Senegal)	Ibrahima Wadji	1	2	0	3
12	MF	9	(Sweden)	Mattias Moström	2	0	0	2
12	DF	28	(Norway)	Kristoffer Haugen	2	0	0	2
12	MF	14	(Norway)	Petter Strand	1	0	1	2
15	DF	4	(Norway)	Ruben Gabrielsen	1	0	0	1
15	DF	5	(Norway)	Vegard Forren	1	0	0	1
15	MF	7	(Norway)	Mathias Normann	1	0	0	1
15	FW	20	(Cameroon)	Thomas Amang	1	0	0	1
				Own goal	1	0	0	1
TOTALS					63	6	17	86

=== Clean sheets ===
Rank	Pos.	No.	Nat.	Player	Eliteserien	Norwegian Cup	Europa League	Total
1	GK	1	(Sweden)	Andreas Linde	8	0	4	12
2	GK	26	(Norway)	Mathias Eriksen Ranmark	1	0	0	1
TOTALS					9	0	4	13

=== Disciplinary record ===
As of match played 24 November 2018

No.	Pos.	Nat.	Name	Eliteserien		Norwegian Cup		Europa League		Total	
No.	Pos.	Nat.	Name	Yellow card	Red card	Yellow card	Red card	Yellow card	Red card	Yellow card	Red card
2	DF	(Sweden)	Isak Ssewankambo	1	0	0	0	0	0	1	0
4	DF	(Norway)	Ruben Gabrielsen	3	0	0	0	1	0	4	0
5	DF	(Norway)	Vegard Forren	5	0	0	0	3	0	8	0
6	DF	(Norway)	Stian Rode Gregersen	2	0	0	0	2	0	4	0
7	MF	(Norway)	Magnus Wolff Eikrem	2	0	0	0	0	0	2	0
8	MF	(Senegal)	Babacar Sarr	5	0	0	0	1	0	6	0
9	MF	(Sweden)	Mattias Moström	2	0	0	0	0	0	2	0
14	MF	(Norway)	Petter Strand	0	0	1	0	0	0	1	0
16	MF	(Norway)	Etzaz Hussain	5	0	0	0	1	0	6	0
17	MF	(Norway)	Fredrik Aursnes	5	0	1	0	0	0	6	0
19	MF	(Norway)	Eirik Hestad	3	0	0	0	1	0	4	0
22	DF	(Denmark)	Christoffer Remmer	2	0	0	0	0	0	2	0
24	FW	(Sweden)	Paweł Cibicki	1	0	0	0	0	0	1	0
27	FW	(Nigeria)	Daniel Chima Chukwu	1	0	0	0	1	0	2	0
28	DF	(Norway)	Kristoffer Haugen	2	0	0	0	0	0	2	0
30	FW	(Norway)	Erling Haaland	1	0	0	0	1	0	2	0
Players away from Molde on loan:
21	MF	(Norway)	Tobias Svendsen	0	0	1	0	0	0	1	0
Players who appeared for Molde no longer at the club:
7	MF	(Norway)	Mathias Normann	2	1	0	0	0	0	2	1
TOTALS				42	1	3	0	11	0	56	1

== See also ==
- Molde FK seasons
