= 2017 Molde FK season =

Molde
2017 season
- Chairman: Odd Ivar Moen
- Manager: Ole Gunnar Solskjær
- Stadium: Aker Stadion
- Eliteserien: 2nd
- Norwegian Cup: Semi-final vs Lillestrøm
- Top goalscorer: League: Björn Bergmann Sigurðarson (16); All: Björn Bergmann Sigurðarson (17)
- Highest home attendance: 10,720 vs Rosenborg (12 August 2017)
- Lowest home attendance: 6,635 vs Lillestrøm (5 April 2017)
- Average home league attendance: 7,785
Home colours	Away colours	Third colours

The 2017 season was Molde's tenth consecutive year in the top flight which from the beginning of this season is known as Eliteserien, and their 41st season in the top flight of Norwegian football. Along with the Eliteserien, the club also competed in the Norwegian Cup.

Molde finished 2nd in Eliteserien and reached the semifinal in the Norwegian Cup where the team were defeated by Lillestrøm.

== Season events ==
On 29 December 2016, Molde announced that Mark Dempsey had returned to the club as an Assistant Manager, working alongside Erling Moe, on a 2 1/2-year contract.

After the season was finished, Björn Bergmann Sigurðarson was named Molde FK Player of the season by players, coaches and staff at the club. Best player in the under-23 category was Stian Rode Gregersen.

== Squad ==
As of 26 November 2017

Note: Flags indicate national team as defined under FIFA eligibility rules; some limited exceptions apply. Players may hold more than one non-FIFA nationality.

No.	Pos.	Nation	Player
1	GK	SWE	Andreas Linde
2	DF	SWE	Isak Ssewankambo
4	DF	NOR	Ruben Gabrielsen (Captain)
5	DF	FIN	Joona Toivio
6	MF	NOR	Stian Rode Gregersen
7	MF	NOR	Mathias Normann (loan from Brighton & Hove Albion)
8	MF	SEN	Babacar Sarr
9	FW	SWE	Mattias Moström
10	FW	ISL	Björn Bergmann Sigurðarson
11	MF	NOR	Martin Ellingsen
14	MF	NOR	Petter Strand
15	DF	FRO	Sonni Nattestad
17	MF	NOR	Fredrik Aursnes
19	MF	NOR	Eirik Hestad

No.	Pos.	Nation	Player
20	FW	CMR	Thomas Amang
21	MF	NOR	Tobias Svendsen
22	DF	DEN	Christoffer Remmer
23	DF	NOR	Knut Olav Rindarøy
24	MF	NOR	Eman Markovic
25	FW	ISL	Óttar Magnús Karlsson
26	GK	NOR	Mathias Eriksen Ranmark
27	DF	NOR	Martin Ove Roseth
28	FW	SEN	Ibrahima Wadji
29	DF	NOR	Vegard Forren
30	FW	NOR	Erling Haaland
32	MF	SWE	Christopher Telo
33	FW	NOR	Fredrik Brustad
51	DF	NOR	Leo Skiri Østigård

=== Reserve squad ===
Note: Flags indicate national team as defined under FIFA eligibility rules; some limited exceptions apply. Players may hold more than one non-FIFA nationality.

No.	Pos.	Nation	Player
40	GK	NOR	Isak Gangeskar
41	GK	NOR	Erik Iversen
42	MF	NOR	Erik Rotlid
43	DF	NOR	Mats Aambø
44	FW	NOR	Jan Tidjani Aboubacar
45	FW	NOR	Sivert Gussiås
46	DF	NOR	Simen Hagbø
50	GK	NOR	Jonatan Strand Byttingsvik
54	FW	NOR	Elias Mordal

No.	Pos.	Nation	Player
55	MF	NOR	Jesper Kjølstad Nyheim
56	MF	NOR	Tobias Kjølstad Nyheim
58	DF	NOR	Thor-Olav Moe
59	DF	NOR	Adnan Dudić
60	FW	NOR	Elias Arntsen
61	MF	NOR	Hermann B. Svendsen
63	FW	NOR	Lars J. Ranheim
45	FW	NOR	Jonas S. Frøystad

=== Players on loan ===
Note: Flags indicate national team as defined under FIFA eligibility rules; some limited exceptions apply. Players may hold more than one non-FIFA nationality.

No.	Pos.	Nation	Player
—	DF	FIN	Roni Peiponen (at HJK until 31 December 2017)
—	MF	BRA	Agnaldo (at Vila Nova until 31 December 2017)
—	MF	BRA	Neydson (at Elverum until 31 December 2017)
—	MF	NOR	Etzaz Hussain (at Odd until 31 December 2017)

No.	Pos.	Nation	Player
—	DF	NOR	Kristian Fredrik Aasen Strande (at Brattvåg until 31 December 2017)
—	MF	NOR	Ola Ormset Husby (at Brattvåg until 31 December 2017)
—	DF	NOR	Ole Martin Rindarøy (at Sogndal until 31 December 2017)

== Transfers ==
=== In ===
Date	Position	Nationality	Name	From	Fee
24 November 2016	FW	(Iceland)	Óttar Karlsson	(Iceland) Vikingur Reykjavik	Unknown
13 December 2016	DF	(Faroe Islands)	Sonni Nattestad	(Iceland) FH	Free
31 December 2016	DF	(Norway)	Ole Martin Rindarøy	(Norway) Lillestrøm	Loan Return
1 February 2017	FW	(Norway)	Erling Haaland	(Norway) Bryne	Unknown
28 February 2017	MF	(Norway)	Etzaz Hussain	(Croatia) Rudeš	Unknown
30 June 2017	GK	(Norway)	Mathias Eriksen Ranmark	(Norway) Oppsal	Unknown
27 July 2017	DF	(Norway)	Vegard Forren	(England) Brighton & Hove Albion	Free
28 July 2017	MF	(Sweden)	Christopher Telo	(Sweden) IFK Norrköping	Unknown
8 August 2017	FW	(Senegal)	Ibrahima Wadji	(Turkey) Gazişehir Gaziantep	Free
11 August 2017	MF	(Norway)	Martin Ellingsen	(Norway) Kongsvinger	Undisclosed

=== Out ===
Date	Position	Nationality	Name	To	Fee
3 January 2017	GK	(United States)	Ethan Horvath	(Belgium) Club Brugge	Unknown
29 December 2016	DF	(Norway)	Per-Egil Flo	(Czech Republic) Slavia Prague	Free
19 July 2017	MF	(Nigeria)	Thompson Ekpe	(Norway) Arendal	Unknown
1 August 2017	MF	(Senegal)	Amidou Diop	(Norway) Kristiansund	Unknown
11 August 2017	FW	(Norway)	Sander Svendsen	(Sweden) Hammarby	€ 500 000

=== Loans in ===
Date from	Date to	Position	Nationality	Name	From
16 August 2017	31 December 2017	MF	(Norway)	Mathias Normann	Brighton & Hove Albion

=== Loans out ===
Date from	Date to	Position	Nationality	Name	To
16 January 2017	31 December 2017	MF	(Brazil)	Agnaldo	(Brazil) Vila Nova
9 March 2017	31 July 2017	MF	(Nigeria)	Thompson Ekpe	Kristiansund
4 April 2017	1 July 2017	MF	(Norway)	Ola Ormset Husby	Levanger
13 July 2017	31 December 2017	DF	(Norway)	Kristian Fredrik Aasen Strande	Brattvåg
13 July 2017	31 December 2017	MF	(Norway)	Ola Ormset Husby	Brattvåg
19 July 2017	31 December 2017	GK	(Brazil)	Neydson	Elverum
2 August 2017	31 December 2017	DF	(Norway)	Ole Martin Rindarøy	Sogndal
16 August 2017	31 December 2017	MF	(Norway)	Etzaz Hussain	Odd

=== Released ===
Date	Position	Nationality	Name	Joined	Date
5 December 2016	MF	(Norway)	Thomas Kind Bendiksen	Sandefjord	13 December 2016
31 December 2016	DF	(Norway)	Vegard Forren	(England) Brighton & Hove Albion	9 March 2017
31 December 2016	FW	(Senegal)	Pape Paté Diouf	Odd	20 January 2017
31 December 2016	FW	(United States)	Joshua Gatt	(United States) Minnesota United	15 February 2017
31 December 2016	MF	(Norway)	Harmeet Singh	(Poland) Wisły Płock	21 March 2017

=== Trial ===
Date From	Date To	Position	Nationality	Name	Last club

== Friendlies ==
28 January 2017	Molde	5–1	Romsdal	Molde
13:00 CET (UTC+1)	Hestad 37'; Aursnes; Gussiås; Svendsen	Summary	J.R.Angvik	Stadium: Aker Stadion

4 February 2017	BK Häcken (Sweden)	2–3	(Norway) Molde	Dubai, United Arab Emirates
9:30 CET (UTC+1)	74'; 84'	Summary	Svendsen 8', 62'; Karlsson 12'

7 February 2017	Copenhagen (Denmark)	1–1 (3–4 p)	(Norway) Molde	Dubai, United Arab Emirates
13:00 CET (UTC+1)	Karlsson 43'	Summary	Okore 72'
	Penalties
	(penalty scored) (penalty scored) (penalty scored); Høgli (penalty missed); Pavlović (penalty missed)		Toivio (penalty scored); Remmer (penalty scored); Karlsson (penalty scored); Svendsen (penalty scored)

17 February 2017	Molde	0–2	Bodø/Glimt	Molde
14:00 CET (UTC+1)		Summary	Opseth 30'; Jacobsen 40'	Stadium: Aker Stadion

22 February 2017	Molde	8–0	Hødd	Molde
18:00 CET (UTC+1)	Remmer 17'; Hestad 19'; Strand 23'; O.Rindarøy 24'; Svendsen 35'; Sigurðarson 50'; Brustad 69'; S.Arson 86'	Summary		Stadium: Aker Stadion

28 February 2017	Molde	2–1	Tromsø	Molde
19:00 CET (UTC+1)	Brustad 2'; Karlsson 34'	Summary	Olsen 36'	Stadium: Aker Stadion

11 March 2017	Molde (Norway)	1–0	(Finland) SJK	Marbella, Spain
13:30 CET (UTC+1)	S.Svendsen 54'	Summary		Stadium: San Pedro Alcantara Tana Municipal Stadium

15 March 2017	Molde (Norway)	4–1	(Iceland) FH	Marbella, Spain
16:30 CET (UTC+1)	Brustad 18', 46'; Sarr 44'; Sigurðarson 76'	Summary	25'	Stadium: San Pedro Alcantara Tana Municipal Stadium

18 March 2017	Molde (Norway)	1–1	(Sweden) Malmö	Marbella, Spain
16:00 CET (UTC+1)	Hestad 90'	Summary	6'	Stadium: San Pedro Alcantara Tana Municipal Stadium

25 March 2017	Aalesund	5–1	Molde	Ålesund
16:00 CET (UTC+1)	Abdellaoue 34' (pen.), 75'; Þrándarson 38'; Grétarsson 60'; Berisha 71'	Summary	Hussain 64'	Stadium: Color Line Stadion

30 July 2017	Kristiansund	2–3	Molde	Kristiansund
13:00 CET (UTC+1)	Bruseth 56'; Ulvestad 71'	Summary	Aursnes 6'; Remmer 62'; Tripić 90'	Stadium: Kristiansund Stadion

5 September 2017	Djurgården (Sweden)	0–1	(Norway) Molde	Stockholm, Sweden
19:00 CET (UTC+1)		Summary	Brustad 79'	Stadium: Stockholm Stadion

== Competitions ==
=== Eliteserien ===
==== Results summary ====
Overall								Home						Away					
Pld	W	D	L	GF	GA	GD	Pts	W	D	L	GF	GA	GD	W	D	L	GF	GA	GD
30	16	6	8	50	35	+15	54	9	2	4	26	14	+12	7	4	4	24	21	+3

Last updated: 26 November 2017.
Source: see below

==== Results by round ====
Round	1	2	3	4	5	6	7	8	9	10	11	12	13	14	15	16	17	18	19	20	21	22	23	24	25	26	27	28	29	30
Ground	A	H	A	H	A	A	H	A	H	A	H	A	H	A	H	A	H	A	H	A	H	A	H	A	H	H	H	H	A	H
Result	W	W	L	W	D	D	L	L	L	W	W	L	W	D	W	W	D	W	L	L	W	W	W	D	W	W	W	L	W	D
Position	6	3	6	2	5	5	6	7	10	7	7	7	5	5	4	4	3	3	4	4	4	4	3	3	2	2	2	2	2	2

Updated to match(es) played on 26 November 2017. Source: see below
A = Away; H = Home; W = Win; D = Draw; L = Loss

==== Results ====
1 April 2017 1	Kristiansund	0–1	Molde	Kristiansund
18:00 CEST (UTC+2)	Sørli (yellow card) 65'	Report	Sarr (yellow card) 30'; Remmer (yellow card) 49'; Brustad 51'; Linde (yellow card) 90+2'	Stadium: Kristiansund Stadion; Attendance: 4,104; Referee: Tom Harald Hagen

5 April 2017 2	Molde	2–1	Lillestrøm	Molde
19:00 CEST (UTC+2)	S.Svendsen 29'; Gregersen 90+3'	Report	Mathew 47'	Stadium: Aker Stadion; Attendance: 6,635; Referee: Espen Eskås

8 April 2017 3	Rosenborg	2–1	Molde	Trondheim
18:00 CEST (UTC+2)	Jevtović 7'; Midtsjø 9'	Report	Bendtner 21' (o.g.); Strand (yellow card) 38'; Gregersen (yellow card) 61'; Sarr (yellow card) 84'	Stadium: Lerkendal Stadion; Attendance: 20,843; Referee: Tom Harald Hagen

17 April 2017 4	Molde	4–0	Vålerenga	Molde
18:00 CEST (UTC+2)	S.Svendsen 7', 28'; Näsberg 11'; Sigurðarson 46'	Report	Näsberg (yellow card) 63'; Berntsen (yellow card) 84'	Stadium: Aker Stadion; Attendance: 7,226; Referee: Dag Vidar Hafsås

24 April 2017 5	Haugesund	0–0	Molde	Haugesund
19:00 CEST (UTC+2)		Report	Gabrielsen (yellow card) 38'; Aursnes (yellow card) 82'	Stadium: Haugesund Stadion; Attendance: 3,788; Referee: Kai Erik Steen

30 April 2017 6	Sandefjord	3–3	Molde	Sandefjord
18:00 CEST (UTC+2)	Sødlund (yellow card) 9'; Storbæk 34'; Seck 74'; Morer 90+6' (pen.)	Report	Sigurðarson 67', 72'; Brustad 76' (yellow card) 90+2'	Stadium: Komplett Arena; Attendance: 4,340; Referee: Trygve Kjensli

6 May 2017 7	Molde	0–1	Aalesund	Molde
18:00 CEST (UTC+2)	Hussain (yellow card) 38'	Report	Abdellaoue 45'; Ramsteijn (yellow card) 59'	Stadium: Aker Stadion; Attendance: 9,488; Referee: Trond Ivar Døvle

13 May 2017 8	Brann	4–1	Molde	Bergen
20:00 CEST (UTC+2)	Kristiansen 39'; Barmen (yellow card) 49'; Grønner 58'; Orlov 85'; Braaten 87'	Report	Brustad 43'	Stadium: Brann Stadion; Attendance: 10,227; Referee: Tore Hansen

16 May 2017 9	Molde	1–2	Sogndal	Molde
18:00 CEST (UTC+2)	Sigurðarson 58'	Report	Ramsland 48'; Schulze 57'; Wæhler (yellow card) 62'	Stadium: Aker Stadion; Attendance: 7,106; Referee: Trygve Kjensli

21 May 2017 10	Odd	1–2	Molde	Skien
20:00 CEST (UTC+2)	Ruud (yellow card) 79'; Berg 90+3'	Report	Hestad (yellow card) 41'; Aursnes 53'; Ssewankambo (yellow card) 70'; Gabrielsen 90+5'	Stadium: Skagerak Arena; Attendance: 7,146; Referee: Tom Harald Hagen

28 May 2017 11	Molde	3–1	Stabæk	Molde
18:00 CEST (UTC+2)	Toivio 4'; Hestad (yellow card) 10'; Aursnes (yellow card) 32' (yellow-red card) 61'; Brustad 37'; Svendsen (yellow card) 48'; Sarr (yellow card) 81'; Sigurðarson 90+2'	Report	Kassi (yellow card) 28' (goal) 58'; Lumanza (yellow card) 90'	Stadium: Aker Stadion; Attendance: 7,281; Referee: Kristoffer Hagenes

4 June 2017 12	Sarpsborg 08	1–0	Molde	Sarpsborg
18:00 CEST (UTC+2)	Mortensen 62'; Trondsen (yellow card) 64'	Report	Hussain (yellow card) 40'; Haaland (yellow card) 72'; Gregersen 90+1'	Stadium: Sarpsborg Stadion; Attendance: 4,648; Referee: Espen Eskås

18 June 2017 13	Molde	3–0	Tromsø	Molde
18:00 CEST (UTC+2)	Hussain 55'; Sigurðarson 57'; Aursnes (yellow card) 81'; Brustad 83'	Report	Wangberg (yellow card) 70'	Stadium: Aker Stadion; Attendance: 7,756; Referee: Ola Hobber Nilsen

26 June 2017 14	Strømsgodset	1–1	Molde	Drammen
19:00 CEST (UTC+2)	Andersen 48'; Jradi (yellow card) 61'; Nguen (yellow card) 69'; Pedersen (yellow card) 78'	Report	Sigurðarson 38'; Gregersen (yellow card) 56'; Hestad (yellow card) 90+3'	Stadium: Marienlyst Stadion; Attendance: 6,372; Referee: Tom Harald Hagen

2 July 2017 15	Molde	3–2	Viking	Molde
18:00 CEST (UTC+2)	Strand 5'; Sigurðarson 30' (pen.); Amang (yellow card) 82' (yellow-red card) 90+5' (goal) 90+4'; Hussain (yellow card) 83'	Report	Martinsen (yellow card) 29'; Ryerson (yellow card) 54'; Bringaker 72' (yellow card) 90+1'; Haugen 84'; Sale (yellow card) 90+1'	Stadium: Aker Stadion; Attendance: 7,831; Referee: Espen Eskås

8 July 2017 16	Aalesund	0–3	Molde	Ålesund
18:00 CEST (UTC+2)	Lie (yellow card) 57'	Report	Sigurðarson 22', 57' (pen.); Brustad 75'	Stadium: Color Line Stadion; Attendance: 9,062; Referee: Svein Oddvar Moen

16 July 2017 17	Molde	0–0	Strømsgodset	Molde
18:00 CEST (UTC+2)		Report		Stadium: Aker Stadion; Attendance: 8,628; Referee: Tommy Skjerven

6 August 2017 18	Tromsø	1–2	Molde	Tromsø
18:00 CEST (UTC+2)	Olsen 25'	Report	S.Svendsen 27'; Haaland 77'; Strand (yellow card) 90+2'	Stadium: Alfheim Stadion; Attendance: 3,812; Referee: Trond Ivar Døvle

12 August 2017 19	Molde	1–2	Rosenborg	Molde
18:00 CEST (UTC+2)	Brustad 5'; Ssewankambo (yellow card) 90'	Report	Jensen (yellow card) 20'; Bendtner 73'; Konradsen 85'	Stadium: Aker Stadion; Attendance: 10,720; Referee: Ola Hobber Nilsen

20 August 2017 20	Stabæk	3–2	Molde	Bærum
18:00 CEST (UTC+2)	Sæter 16'; Kassi 57'; Omoijuanfo 74' (pen.)	Report	Forren (yellow card) 29'; Sigurðarson 61'; Brustad 88'	Stadium: Nadderud Stadion; Attendance: 4,728; Referee: Tom Harald Hagen

11 September 2017 21	Molde	2–1	Odd	Molde
19:00 CEST (UTC+2)	Strand 49'; Sarr (yellow card) 58'; Amang 90'	Report	Rashani (yellow card) 19'; Riski (yellow card) 45'; Samuelsen 59' (pen.); Hagen (yellow card) 90+4'	Stadium: Aker Stadion; Attendance: 6,851; Referee: Espen Eskås

17 September 2017 22	Viking	2–3	Molde	Stavanger
18:00 CEST (UTC+2)	Sarr 2' (o.g.); Cruz (red card) 11'; Jenkins (yellow card) 45'; Høiland 77'	Report	Sigurðarson 13' (pen.); Ellingsen 33'; Normann (yellow card) 60'; Haaland 80'; Telo (yellow card) 90+2'	Stadium: Viking Stadion; Attendance: 6,737; Referee: Martin Lundby

24 September 2017 23	Molde	3–1	Sandefjord	Molde
18:00 CEST (UTC+2)	Amang 14', 55'; Wadji (yellow card) 58'; Ellingsen 78'	Report	Rodriguez 21'; Seck (yellow card) 69'	Stadium: Aker Stadion; Attendance: 7,098; Referee: Kristoffer Hagenes

1 October 2017 24	Sogndal	2–2	Molde	Sogndalsfjøra
18:00 CEST (UTC+2)	Mandić 12'; Nwakali 23'; Hovland (yellow card) 50'	Report	Sigurðarson 36'; Strand 45+3'	Stadium: Fosshaugane Campus; Attendance: 3,012; Referee: Dag Vidar Hafsås

15 October 2017 25	Molde	1–0	Brann	Molde
20:00 CEST (UTC+2)	Forren (yellow card) 52'; Gregersen (yellow card) 68'; Gabrielsen 90+5'	Report	Barmen (yellow card) 35'; Acosta (yellow card) 87'; Braaten (yellow card) 88'	Stadium: Aker Stadion; Attendance: 6,861; Referee: Ola Hobber Nilsen

22 October 2017 26	Molde	1–0	Haugesund	Molde
18:00 CEST (UTC+2)	Sarr 29'; Moström (yellow card) 45+1'	Report		Stadium: Aker Stadion; Attendance: 6,866; Referee: Martin Lundby

29 October 2017 27	Vålerenga	1–2	Molde	Oslo
20:00 CET (UTC+1)	Stengel 8'; Näsberg (yellow card) 85'	Report	Sigurðarson 38'; Gabrielsen 90+3'	Stadium: Intility Arena; Attendance: 9,402; Referee: Svein Oddvar Moen

4 November 2017 28	Molde	0–1	Kristiansund	Molde
18:00 CET (UTC+1)	Aursnes (yellow card) 49'; Forren (yellow card) 85'; Brustad (yellow card) 90'	Report	Stokke (yellow card) 67'; Bamba 70' (yellow card) 70'	Stadium: Aker Stadion; Attendance: 9,014; Referee: Ola Hobber Nilsen

19 November 2017 29	Lillestrøm	0–1	Molde	Lillestrøm
18:00 CET (UTC+1)	Tagbajumi (penalty missed) 83'	Report	Wadji 14'; Sarr (yellow card) 44'; Normann (yellow card) 71'	Stadium: Åråsen Stadion; Attendance: 4,358; Referee: Tommy Skjerven

26 November 2017 30	Molde	2–2	Sarpsborg 08	Molde
18:00 CET (UTC+1)	Sigurðarson 61', 74'; Gregersen (yellow card) 83'; Haaland (yellow card) 86'	Report	Mortensen 50'; Zachariassen 55' (yellow card) 66'	Stadium: Aker Stadion; Attendance: 7,419; Referee: Espen Eskås

==== Table ====
Pos	Team	Pld	W	D	L	GF	GA	GD	Pts	Qualification or relegation
1	Rosenborg (C)	30	18	7	5	57	20	+37	61	Qualification for the Champions League first qualifying round
2	Molde	30	16	6	8	50	35	+15	54	Qualification for the Europa League first qualifying round
3	Sarpsborg 08	30	13	12	5	50	36	+14	51	Qualification for the Europa League first qualifying round
4	Strømsgodset	30	14	8	8	45	37	+8	50	
5	Brann	30	13	8	9	51	36	+15	47	

Source: Football Association of Norway (in Norwegian), Soccerway
Rules for classification: 1) Points; 2) Goal difference; 3) Goals scored; 4) Head-to-head points; 5) Head-to-head goal difference; 6) Head-to-head away goals scored (only if between two teams); 7) Head-to-head goals scored; 8) Play-off (only used to decide champions or relegation).
(C) Champions

=== Norwegian Cup ===
26 April 2017 First Round	Volda	2–3	Molde	Volda
18:00 CEST (UTC+2)	F.Kvalsnes 60'; M.Dahlberg 67'	Report	Hussain (yellow card) 32'; Haaland 46'; Neydson (yellow card) 52'; Karlsson 52'; S.Svendsen 83'	Stadium: Volda Stadion; Attendance: 2,176; Referee: Mathias Smehus Kringstadbukta

24 May 2017 Second Round	Hødd	1–2	Molde	Ulsteinvik
18:00 CEST (UTC+2)	B.Rise 68'	Report	Amang (yellow card) 66' (goal) 81'; Hussain 90+2'	Stadium: Høddvoll Stadion; Attendance: 1,083; Referee: Marius Hansen Grøtta

1 June 2017 Third Round	KFUM	1–2	Molde	Oslo
18:00 CEST (UTC+2)	Sortevik 39' (yellow card) 90+3'; Nenass (yellow card) 90'	Report	O.Rindarøy (yellow card) 4'; Brustad 58', 61'; Hestad (yellow card) 89'	Stadium: KFUM Arena; Attendance: 1,357; Referee: Anders Gjermshus

9 August 2017 Fourth Round	Haugesund	0–2	Molde	Haugesund
18:00 CEST (UTC+2)	Serafin (yellow card) 16'; Hajradinović (yellow card) 22' (yellow-red card); Ćosić (yellow card) 85'; Andreassen (yellow card) 88'	Report	Brustad 3'; Sigurðarson 66'; Remmer (yellow card) 83'	Stadium: Haugesund Stadion; Attendance: 2,688; Referee: Rohit Saggi

27 August 2017 Quarterfinal	Molde	2–1	Kristiansund	Molde
17:45 CEST (UTC+2)	Haaland 75' (yellow card) 89'; Ellingsen 78'	Report	Stokke 8' (yellow card) 56'; Coly (yellow card) 35'	Stadium: Aker Stadion; Attendance: 7,755; Referee: Ola Hobber Nilsen

21 September 2017 Semifinal	Molde	0–3	Lillestrøm	Molde
19:00 CEST (UTC+2)	Haaland (yellow card) 83'	Report	Mikalsen 75'; Knudtzon 87'; Melgalvis 90+1'	Stadium: Aker Stadion; Attendance: 6,482; Referee: Svein Oddvar Moen

== Squad statistics ==
As of Match played 26 November 2017

=== Appearances and goals ===
No.	Pos	Nat	Player	Total		Eliteserien		Norwegian Cup	
No.	Pos	Nat	Player	Apps	Goals	Apps	Goals	Apps	Goals
1	GK	(Sweden) SWE	Andreas Linde	35	0	30	0	5	0
2	DF	(Sweden) SWE	Isak Ssewankambo	21	0	14+3	0	4	0
4	DF	(Norway) NOR	Ruben Gabrielsen	30	3	23+4	3	3	0
5	DF	(Finland) FIN	Joona Toivio	16	1	11+1	1	3+1	0
6	MF	(Norway) NOR	Stian Rode Gregersen	29	1	25+2	1	2	0
7	MF	(Norway) NOR	Mathias Normann	7	0	4+1	0	1+1	0
8	MF	(Senegal) SEN	Babacar Sarr	30	1	25	1	5	0
9	FW	(Sweden) SWE	Mattias Moström	6	0	5+1	0	0	0
10	FW	(Iceland) ISL	Björn Bergmann Sigurðarson	30	17	26+1	16	2+1	1
11	MF	(Norway) NOR	Martin Ellingsen	13	3	11	2	1+1	1
14	MF	(Norway) NOR	Petter Strand	25	3	18+3	3	4	0
17	MF	(Norway) NOR	Fredrik Aursnes	30	1	20+7	1	3	0
19	MF	(Norway) NOR	Eirik Hestad	26	0	19+1	0	2+4	0
20	FW	(Cameroon) CMR	Thomas Amang	19	5	5+11	4	3	1
21	MF	(Norway) NOR	Tobias Svendsen	8	0	0+6	0	2	0
22	DF	(Denmark) DEN	Christoffer Remmer	34	0	26+2	0	6	0
23	DF	(Norway) NOR	Knut Olav Rindarøy	6	0	3+2	0	1	0
25	FW	(Iceland) ISL	Óttar Magnús Karlsson	11	1	2+6	0	3	1
26	GK	(Norway) NOR	Mathias Eriksen Ranmark	1	0	0+1	0	0	0
28	FW	(Senegal) SEN	Ibrahima Wadji	10	1	3+6	1	0+1	0
29	DF	(Norway) NOR	Vegard Forren	12	0	10	0	2	0
30	FW	(Norway) NOR	Erling Haaland	19	4	3+10	2	2+4	2
32	MF	(Sweden) SWE	Christopher Telo	2	0	1+1	0	0	0
33	FW	(Norway) NOR	Fredrik Brustad	32	11	22+5	8	3+2	3
51	DF	(Norway) NOR	Leo Skiri Østigård	1	0	0+1	0	0	0
Players away from Molde on loan:
3	DF	(Norway) NOR	Ole Martin Rindarøy	9	0	2+4	0	3	0
16	MF	(Norway) NOR	Etzaz Hussain	17	2	9+4	1	3+1	1
34	GK	(Brazil) BRA	Neydson	1	0	0	0	1	0
Players who left Molde during the season:
11	FW	(Norway) NOR	Sander Svendsen	18	5	13+2	4	2+1	1
18	MF	(Senegal) SEN	Amidou Diop	4	0	0+2	0	2	0

=== Goal scorers ===
Rank	Pos.	No.	Player	Eliteserien	Norwegian Cup	Total
1	FW	10	(Iceland) Björn Bergmann Sigurðarson	16	1	17
2	FW	33	(Norway) Fredrik Brustad	8	3	11
3	FW	11	(Norway) Sander Svendsen	4	1	5
3	FW	20	(Cameroon) Thomas Amang	4	1	5
5	FW	30	(Norway) Erling Haaland	2	2	4
6	MF	14	(Norway) Petter Strand	3	0	3
6	DF	4	(Norway) Ruben Gabrielsen	3	0	3
6	MF	11	(Norway) Martin Ellingsen	2	1	3
9	MF	16	(Norway) Etzaz Hussain	1	1	2
10	MF	6	(Norway) Stian Rode Gregersen	1	0	1
10	MF	17	(Norway) Fredrik Aursnes	1	0	1
10	DF	5	(Finland) Joona Toivio	1	0	1
10	MF	8	(Senegal) Babacar Sarr	1	0	1
10	FW	28	(Senegal) Ibrahima Wadji	1	0	1
10	FW	25	(Iceland) Óttar Magnús Karlsson	0	1	1
			Own goals	2	0	2
TOTALS				50	11	61

=== Disciplinary record ===
Number	Nation	Position	Name	Eliteserien		Norwegian Cup		Total	
Number	Nation	Position	Name	Yellow card	Red card	Yellow card	Red card	Yellow card	Red card
1	(Sweden)	GK	Andreas Linde	1	0	0	0	1	0
2	(Sweden)	DF	Isak Ssewankambo	2	0	0	0	2	0
3	(Norway)	DF	Ole Martin Rindarøy	0	0	1	0	1	0
4	(Norway)	DF	Ruben Gabrielsen	1	0	0	0	1	0
6	(Norway)	MF	Stian Rode Gregersen	5	0	0	0	5	0
7	(Norway)	MF	Mathias Normann	2	0	0	0	2	0
8	(Senegal)	MF	Babacar Sarr	5	0	0	0	5	0
9	(Sweden)	FW	Mattias Moström	1	0	0	0	1	0
11	(Norway)	FW	Sander Svendsen	1	0	0	0	1	0
14	(Norway)	MF	Petter Strand	2	0	0	0	2	0
16	(Norway)	MF	Etzaz Hussain	3	0	1	0	4	0
17	(Norway)	MF	Fredrik Aursnes	3	1	0	0	3	1
19	(Norway)	MF	Eirik Hestad	3	0	1	0	4	0
20	(Cameroon)	FW	Thomas Amang	1	1	1	0	2	1
22	(Denmark)	DF	Christoffer Remmer	1	0	1	0	2	0
28	(Senegal)	FW	Ibrahima Wadji	1	0	0	0	1	0
29	(Norway)	DF	Vegard Forren	3	0	0	0	3	0
30	(Norway)	FW	Erling Haaland	2	0	2	0	4	0
32	(Sweden)	MF	Christopher Telo	1	0	0	0	1	0
33	(Norway)	MF	Fredrik Brustad	2	0	0	0	2	0
34	(Brazil)	GK	Neydson	0	0	1	0	1	0
			TOTALS	40	2	8	0	48	2

== See also ==
- Molde FK seasons
