= Mathias Enger Eriksen =

Norwegian footballer (born 1995)

Mathias Eriksen
Personal information
- Full name: Mathias Enger Eriksen
- Birth name: Mathias Eriksen Ranmark
- Date of birth: 16 October 1995 (age 31)
- Place of birth: Oslo, Norway
- Height: 1.94 m (6 ft 4 1/2 in)
- Position: Goalkeeper

Team information
- Current team: Moss
- Number: 1

Youth career
- –2009: Manglerud Star
- 2010–2014: Oppsal

Senior career*
Years	Team	Apps	(Gls)
2013–2017	Oppsal	91	(0)
2017–2021	Molde	2	(0)
2019	→ Mjøndalen (loan)	5	(0)
2020	→ HamKam (loan)	2	(0)
2021	→ Moss (loan)	11	(0)
2022–	Moss	144	(0)
- * Club domestic league appearances and goals as of 14 November 2026

Mathias Enger Eriksen (née Mathias Eriksen Ranmark; 16 October 1995) is a Norwegian footballer who plays as a goalkeeper for Moss.

== Career ==
Ranmark began his senior career in Oppsal in 2013. On 30 June 2017, he signed for Eliteserien club Molde. Ranmark got his Molde debut on 12 August 2017, when, following an injury on first-choice Andreas Linde, he came on as a 62nd minute substitute in an Eliteserien game against Rosenborg. Molde were leading the game 1–0, but eventually lost 2–1 after a mistake from Ranmark on the equalising goal.

In the 2019 season, Ranmark was loaned out to Mjøndalen.

On 6 February 2020, Ranmark was loaned out to 1. divisjon club HamKam.

== Career statistics ==
=== Club ===
As of match played 14 November 2026

Appearances and goals by club, season and competition
Club	Season	League			Cup		Continental		Other		Total	
Club	Season	Division	Apps	Goals	Apps	Goals	Apps	Goals	Apps	Goals	Apps	Goals
Oppsal	2013	3. divisjon	10	0	0	0	–		–		10	0
Oppsal	2014	3. divisjon	23	0	1	0	–		–		24	0
Oppsal	2015	3. divisjon	22	0	3	0	–		–		25	0
Oppsal	2016	2. divisjon	25	0	1	0	–		–		26	0
Oppsal	2017	3. divisjon	11	0	1	0	–		–		12	0
Oppsal	Total		91	0	6	0	–	–	–	–	97	0
Molde	2017	Eliteserien	1	0	0	0	–		–		1	0
Molde	2018	Eliteserien	1	0	1	0	0	0	–		2	0
Molde	Total		2	0	1	0	0	0	–	–	3	0
Mjøndalen (loan)	2019	Eliteserien	5	0	0	0	–		–		5	0
HamKam (loan)	2020	1. divisjon	2	0	0	0	–		–		2	0
Moss (loan)	2021	2. divisjon	11	0	1	0	–		–		12	0
Moss	2022	2. divisjon	25	0	2	0	–		–		27	0
Moss	2023	1. divisjon	30	0	0	0	–		–		30	0
Moss	2024	1. divisjon	30	0	0	0	–		3 (Note: Appearance in Eliteserien play-offs)	0	30	0
Moss	2025	1. divisjon	30	0	4	0	–		2 (Note: Appearance in Norgwegian First Division Relegation play-offs)	1	34	1
Moss	2026	1. divisjon	30	0	2	0	–		–		32	0
Moss	Total		145	0	8	0	0	0	2	1	155	1
Career total			256	0	16	0	–	–	2	1	274	1
