= Fredrik Brustad =

Norwegian football forward (born 1989)

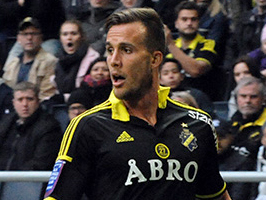

Personal information
- Full name: Fredrik Brustad
- Date of birth: 22 June 1989 (age 37)
- Place of birth: Oslo, Norway
- Height: 1.90 m (6 ft 3 in)
- Position: Forward

Team information
- Current team: KFUM
- Number: 9

Youth career
- Ullern
- Lyn
- 2008–2010: Stetson Hatters

Senior career*
Years	Team	Apps	(Gls)
2010–2011	Central Florida Kraze	23	(6)
2011–2014	Stabæk	94	(22)
2015–2016	AIK	38	(7)
2016–2019	Molde	52	(11)
2018–2019	→ Hamilton Academical (loan)	15	(1)
2019–2021	Mjøndalen	87	(6)
2022–	KFUM	0	(0)

International career^{‡}
2014	Norway	1	(0)
- * Club domestic league appearances and goals as of 20 November 2021 ‡ National team caps and goals as of 28 August 2014

Fredrik Brustad (Norwegian: [ˈfrɛ̀drɪk ˈbrʉ̀ːstɑ]; born 22 June 1989) is a Norwegian football forward who plays for KFUM.

== Club career ==
Brustad was born in Oslo, and played for Ullern and Lyn in his youth. After spending three years of his college soccer career at Stetson University, he signed a contract with the Tippeligaen side Stabæk in August 2011. He made his debut in Tippeligaen in the match against Brann on 21 August 2011. He scored two goals on 29 May 2012 in Stabæk's first win of the season in the match against Lillestrøm, benefitting from his quick pace. Brustad personal record on 40 meter is 4.57 and Stabæk's head coach, Petter Belsvik said; "I would need to have a head start of at least 20 meters to beat him running 40 meters."

Fredrik Brustad signed a three-year pre-contract with AIK starting January 2015. In the summer of 2018 Brustad signed a loan deal with Scottish club Hamilton Academical. The loan was scheduled to run for the whole of the 2018–19 season, but Molde opted to curtail the arrangement in January 2019. On 11 January 2019 Brustad signed for Mjøndalen on a three years contract.

== Personal life ==
Brustad is the half-brother of Norway international footballer Kjetil Wæhler.

== Career statistics ==
As of match played 20 November 2021

Club	Season	Division	League		Cup		Europe		Total	
Club	Season	Division	Apps	Goals	Apps	Goals	Apps	Goals	Apps	Goals
Stabæk	2011	Tippeligaen	11	0	0	0	—		11	0
Stabæk	2012	Tippeligaen	27	5	3	4	—		30	9
Stabæk	2013	1. divisjon	26	7	3	3	—		29	10
Stabæk	2014	Tippeligaen	30	10	6	3	—		36	13
Stabæk	Total		94	22	12	10	—	—	106	32
AIK	2015	Allsvenskan	27	5	3	2	5	0	35	7
AIK	2016	Allsvenskan	11	2	3	1	0	0	14	3
AIK	Total		38	7	6	3	5	0	49	10
Molde	2016	Tippeligaen	9	2	0	0	0	0	9	2
Molde	2017	Eliteserien	27	8	5	3	—		32	11
Molde	2018	Eliteserien	16	1	2	1	2	0	20	2
Molde	Total		52	11	7	4	2	0	65	15
Hamilton (loan)	2018–19	Scottish Premiership	15	1	0	0	0	0	15	1
Hamilton (loan)	Total		15	1	0	0	0	0	15	1
Mjøndalen	2019	Eliteserien	30	2	3	3	0	0	33	5
Mjøndalen	2020	Eliteserien	30	2	0	0	0	0	30	2
Mjøndalen	2021	Eliteserien	27	2	2	0	0	0	29	2
Mjøndalen	Total		87	6	5	3	0	0	92	9
Career Total			285	47	30	20	7	0	223	67
