= Christoffer Remmer =

Danish footballer (born 1993)

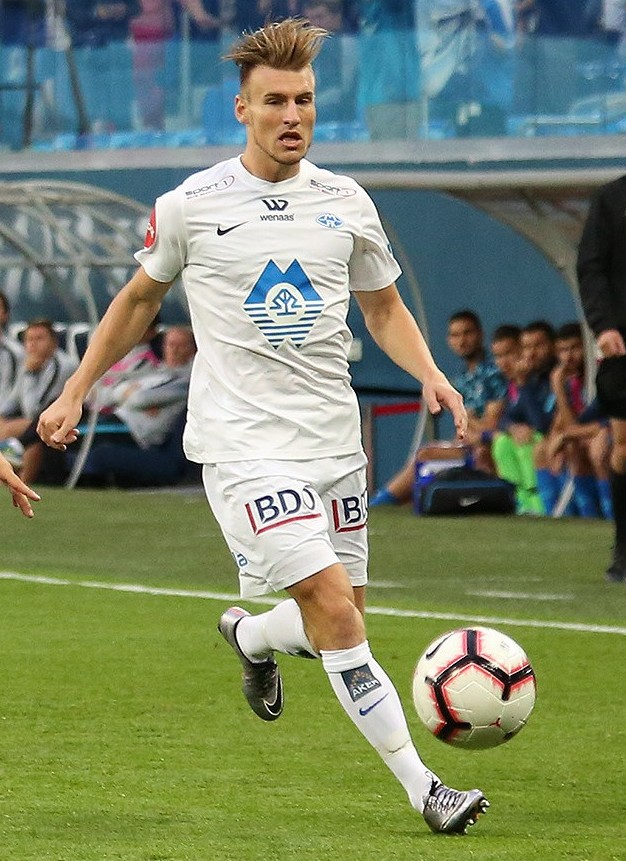
- Remmer with Molde in 2018

Personal information
- Full name: Christoffer Kongsted Remmer
- Date of birth: 16 January 1993 (age 33)
- Place of birth: Hvidovre, Denmark
- Height: 1.82 m (6 ft 0 in)
- Position: Right-back

Team information
- Current team: BK Frem
- Number: 2

Youth career
- –2008: Hvidovre IF
- 2008–2012: Copenhagen

Senior career*
Years	Team	Apps	(Gls)
2012–2016	Copenhagen	49	(0)
2016–2019	Molde	64	(0)
2019–2022	Westerlo	48	(0)
2022–2024	Sønderjyske	11	(0)
2024–	BK Frem	48	(1)

International career
2009	Denmark U16	2	(0)
2010–2011	Denmark U18	7	(0)
2011–2012	Denmark U19	15	(0)
2012–2013	Denmark U20	5	(0)
2013–2014	Denmark U21	7	(2)
- * Club domestic league appearances and goals as of 4 October 2026

Christoffer Kongsted Remmer (born 16 January 1993) is a Danish professional footballer who plays as a right-back for Danish 3rd Division club BK Frem.

== Club career ==
=== Copenhagen ===
Remmer joined the first-team squad at Copenhagen in the beginning of 2012–13 season, together with Andreas Cornelius and Jakob Busk. Remmer was expected to become Lars Jacobsen's successor on the right back position.

Remmer gained his first Superliga match on 4 August 2012, when he was in the starting line-up against Esbjerg fB at Blue Water Arena in Esbjerg. 33 minutes into his debut, he assisted on Martin Vingaard's 1-0 goal.

=== Molde ===
On 10 August 2016, Remmer signed a three-year contract with Norwegian Tippeligaen side Molde FK. He made his debut for the club in a 2–0 away win against Aalesund on 14 August 2016. On 23 May 2019, Remmer scored his first goal in his senior career in Molde's 4–0 win against Sunndal in the Norwegian Cup second round.

=== Westerlo ===
On 16 July 2019, it was confirmed that Remmer had moved to Belgian club Westerlo on a three-year contract.

=== SønderjyskE ===
On 7 June 2022, Remmer returned to his homeland, when he joined newly relegated Danish 1st Division club SønderjyskE on a deal until June 2024. In May 2024, SønderjyskE announced that Remmer will leave the club, when his contract expires.

=== BK Frem ===
On 10 June 2024 the Danish 2nd Division club BK Frem confirmed that the club had signed Christoffer Remmer.

== Personal life ==
In September 2023, Remmer was hospitalised after contracting meningitis, spending ten days in intensive care unit. He made a full recovery, and returned to competitive football in March 2024.

== Career statistics ==
As of match played 5 December 2021

Appearances and goals by club, season and competition
Club	Season	League			National Cup		Continental		Other		Total	
Club	Season	Division	Apps	Goals	Apps	Goals	Apps	Goals	Apps	Goals	Apps	Goals
Copenhagen	2012–13	Danish Superliga	4	0	1	0	0	0	—		5	0
Copenhagen	2013–14	Danish Superliga	14	0	3	0	1	0	—		18	0
Copenhagen	2014–15	Danish Superliga	14	0	3	0	1	0	—		18	0
Copenhagen	2015–16	Danish Superliga	17	0	4	0	1	0	—		22	0
Copenhagen	Total		49	0	11	0	3	0	—	—	63	0
Molde	2016	Tippeligaen	9	0	0	0	0	0	—		9	0
Molde	2017	Eliteserien	28	0	6	0	—		—		34	0
Molde	2018	Eliteserien	24	0	2	0	6	0	—		32	0
Molde	2019	Eliteserien	3	0	3	1	0	0	0	0	6	1
Molde	Total		64	0	11	1	6	0	0	0	81	1
Westerlo	2019–20	First Division B	25	0	3	0	—		—		28	0
Westerlo	2020–21	First Division B	20	0	2	0	—		—		22	0
Westerlo	2021–22	First Division B	3	0	1	1	—		—		4	1
Westerlo	Total		48	0	6	1	—		—		54	1
Career total			161	0	28	2	9	0	0	0	198	2

== Honours ==
Copenhagen

- Danish Superliga: 2012–13, 2015–16
- Danish Cup: 2014–15, 2015–16

Westerlo

- Belgian First Division B: 2019–20, 2021–22
