= Ole Martin Rindarøy =

Norwegian footballer (born 1995)

Personal information
- Full name: Ole Martin Rindarøy
- Date of birth: 16 May 1995 (age 31)
- Place of birth: Aukra Municipality, Norway
- Height: 1.72 m (5 ft 8 in)
- Position: Left back

Youth career
- Gossen
- Molde

Senior career*
Years	Team	Apps	(Gls)
2011–2018	Molde	8	(0)
2015	→ Start (loan)	16	(0)
2016	→ Lillestrøm (loan)	19	(1)
2017	→ Sogndal (loan)	6	(2)
2018–2019	Sogndal	28	(1)

International career
2010	Norway U15	2	(0)
2011	Norway U16	3	(0)
2013	Norway U18	1	(0)
- * Club domestic league appearances and goals

Ole Martin Rindarøy (born 16 May 1995) is a Norwegian retired football defender.

== Career ==
=== Club ===
Rindarøy hails from Aukra where he started his youth career in Gossen. When his older brother Knut Olav Rindarøy was signed by Molde FK, the family moved to Molde Municipality. Ole Martin Rindarøy joined the same club and made his first-team debut in the 2011 Norwegian Football Cup against Tiller IL.

On 8 February 2016, Rindarøy was loaned to Lillestrøm for the 2016 season. He returned to Molde on 31 December 2016.

After playing for Sogndal on loan from August to December 2017, Rindarøy signed a permanent contract with the club on 31 January 2018.

In February 2020, at 24 years old, Rindarøy was forced to retire due to injuries.

== Career statistics ==
=== Club ===
As of match played 4 November 2018

Appearances and goals by club, season and competition
Club	Season	League			National Cup		League Cup		Continental		Other		Total	
Club	Season	Division	Apps	Goals	Apps	Goals	Apps	Goals	Apps	Goals	Apps	Goals	Apps	Goals
Molde	2014	Eliteserien	2	0	2	0	-		1	0	-		5	0
Molde	2015	Eliteserien	0	0	0	0	-		0	0	-		0	0
Molde	2016	Eliteserien	0	0	0	0	-		0	0	-		0	0
Molde	2017	Eliteserien	6	0	3	0	-		-		-		9	0
Molde	Total		8	0	5	0	-	-	1	0	-	-	14	0
Start (loan)	2015	Eliteserien	16	0	2	0	-		-		2	0	20	0
Start (loan)	Total		16	0	2	0	-	-	-	-	2	0	20	0
Lillestrøm (loan)	2016	Eliteserien	19	1	2	0	-		-		-		21	1
Lillestrøm (loan)	Total		19	1	2	0	-	-	-	-	-	-	21	1
Sogndal (loan)	2017	Eliteserien	6	2	0	0	-		-		-		6	2
Sogndal	2018	OBOS-ligaen	20	0	2	0	-		-		-		22	0
Sogndal	Total		26	2	2	0	-	-	-	-	-	-	28	2
Career total			69	3	11	0	-	-	1	0	2	0	83	3
