= 2016 Molde FK season =

Molde
2016 season
- Chairman: Odd Ivar Moen
- Manager: Ole Gunnar Solskjær
- Stadium: Aker Stadion
- Tippeligaen: 5th
- Norwegian Cup: Third Round vs Stjørdals-Blink
- Europa League: Round of 32 vs Sevilla
- Top goalscorer: League: Two players (5); All: Mohamed Elyounoussi (6)
- Highest home attendance: 11,348 vs Rosenborg (24 September 2016)
- Lowest home attendance: 7,284 vs Sevilla (25 February 2016)
- Average home league attendance: 8,392
Home colours	Away colours	Third colours

The 2016 season was Molde's ninth consecutive year in Tippeligaen, and their 40th season in the top flight of Norwegian football. Along with the Tippeligaen, the club also competed in the Norwegian Cup and 2015–16 UEFA Europa League.

The 2016 Eliteserien season is the first season since 2004 without former club captain Daniel Berg Hestad, who retired after the Europa League round of 32 defeat against Sevilla on 25 February 2016. He played 666 games for the club and won 7 trophies, more than any other Molde player.

== Season events ==
Club legend Daniel Berg Hestad had earlier announced that he was going to retire after the 2015 season, but changed his mind because of the ongoing successes of the club in UEFA Europa League. Initially, his contract expired on 31 December 2015, but he was given a special deal from the club allowing him to play for the club until they were knocked out from the Europa League. On 25 February 2016, Molde were defeated 1–3 on aggregate by Sevilla in the round of 32 and Berg Hestad retired with the 1–0 win at home against Sevilla as his last game.

After the season was finished, Ruben Gabrielsen was named Molde FK Player of the season through a vote on the club's website. Best player in the under-23 category was Petter Strand.

== Squad ==
As of end of season

Note: Flags indicate national team as defined under FIFA eligibility rules; some limited exceptions apply. Players may hold more than one non-FIFA nationality.

No.	Pos.	Nation	Player
1	GK	USA	Ethan Horvath
2	FW	USA	Joshua Gatt
3	MF	SEN	Amidou Diop
4	DF	NOR	Ruben Gabrielsen
5	DF	FIN	Joona Toivio (Captain)
7	MF	NOR	Harmeet Singh
8	MF	SEN	Babacar Sarr
9	MF	SWE	Mattias Moström
10	FW	ISL	Björn Bergmann Sigurðarson
11	FW	NOR	Sander Svendsen
13	MF	NGR	Thompson Ekpe
14	MF	NOR	Petter Strand
15	DF	NOR	Per Egil Flo
17	MF	NOR	Fredrik Aursnes
18	DF	FIN	Roni Peiponen

No.	Pos.	Nation	Player
19	MF	NOR	Eirik Hestad
20	FW	CMR	Thomas Amang
21	MF	BRA	Agnaldo
22	DF	DEN	Christoffer Remmer
23	DF	NOR	Knut Olav Rindarøy
25	DF	NOR	Vegard Forren
26	GK	SWE	Andreas Linde
28	MF	NOR	Stian Rode Gregersen
30	FW	SEN	Pape Paté Diouf
32	DF	SWE	Isak Ssewankambo
33	FW	NOR	Fredrik Brustad
34	GK	BRA	Neydson
52	MF	NOR	Tobias Svendsen
53	DF	NOR	Martin Ove Roseth
—	DF	NOR	Ole Martin Rindarøy

=== Reserve squad ===
As of 4 June 2016

Note: Flags indicate national team as defined under FIFA eligibility rules; some limited exceptions apply. Players may hold more than one non-FIFA nationality.

No.	Pos.	Nation	Player
39	MF	NOR	Eskil Rønningen
40	GK	NOR	Isak Gangeskar
41	GK	NOR	Erik Iversen
42	MF	NOR	Erik Rotlid
43	DF	NOR	Mats Aambø
44	FW	NOR	Jan Tidjani Aboubacar
45	FW	NOR	Sivert Gussiås
46	DF	NOR	Simen Hagbø
48	FW	NOR	Erlend Hustad
49	MF	NOR	Ola Ormset Husby
50	GK	NOR	Jonatan Strand Byttingsvik
51	DF	NOR	Kristian Fredrik Aasen Strande

No.	Pos.	Nation	Player
54	FW	NOR	Elias Mordal
55	MF	NOR	Jesper Kjølstad Nyheim
56	MF	NOR	Tobias Kjølstad Nyheim
57	MF	NOR	Eman Markovic
58	DF	NOR	Thor-Olav Moe
59	DF	NOR	Adnan Dudić
60	FW	NOR	Elias Arntsen
61	MF	NOR	Hermann B. Svendsen
62	DF	NOR	Leo Skiri Østigård
63	FW	NOR	Lars J. Ranheim
64	FW	NOR	Jonas S. Frøystad

== Transfers ==
=== In ===
Date	Position	Nationality	Name	From	Fee
6 November 2015	DF	(Finland)	Roni Peiponen	(Finland) HJK Helsinki	Unknown
1 December 2015	MF	(Norway)	Fredrik Aursnes	(Norway) Hødd	Unknown
9 December 2015	FW	(United States)	Ben Spencer	(Canada) Toronto II	Loan return
15 December 2015	MF	(Norway)	Stian Rode Gregersen	(Norway) Kristiansund	Loan return
9 January 2016	MF	(Liberia)	Dulee Johnson	(Norway) Moss	Free
11 January 2016	MF	(Norway)	Thomas Kind Bendiksen	(Norway) Tromsø	Loan return
11 January 2016	FW	(Senegal)	Pape Paté Diouf	(Norway) Odd	Loan return
11 January 2016	DF	(Norway)	Ole Martin Rindarøy	(Norway) Start	Loan return
28 January 2016	MF	(Norway)	Petter Strand	(Norway) Sogndal	Unknown
9 February 2016	FW	(Cameroon)	Thomas Amang	Rainbow Bamenda	Unknown
12 February 2016	FW	(Iceland)	Eiður Guðjohnsen	(China) Shijiazhuang Ever Bright	Free
3 March 2016	DF	(Sweden)	Isak Ssewankambo	(England) Derby County	Unknown
11 March 2016	MF	(Norway)	Harmeet Singh	(Denmark) Midtjylland	Free
23 March 2016	MF	(Nigeria)	Thompson Ekpe		
16 June 2016	FW	(Norway)	Fredrik Brustad	(Sweden) AIK	Unknown
12 July 2016	FW	(Iceland)	Björn Bergmann Sigurðarson	(England) Wolverhampton Wanderers	Free
20 July 2016	MF	(Senegal)	Babacar Sarr	(Norway) Sogndal	Unknown
10 August 2016	DF	(Denmark)	Christoffer Remmer	(Denmark) Copenhagen	Unknown

=== Out ===
Date	Position	Nationality	Name	To	Fee
16 December 2015	DF	(Norway)	Fredrik Semb Berge	(Denmark) Brøndby	Loan return
3 January 2016	MF	(Norway)	Andreas Hollingen	(Norway) Start	Unknown
7 January 2016	FW	(Norway)	Ola Kamara	Austria Wien	Loan return
7 January 2016	MF	(Norway)	Etzaz Hussain	(Turkey) Sivasspor	Free
13 January 2016	DF	(Norway)	Martin Linnes	(Turkey) Galatasaray	Unknown
30 May 2016	FW	(Norway)	Mushaga Bakenga	(Belgium) Club Brugge	Loan return
16 June 2016	FW	(Norway)	Fredrik Gulbrandsen	(Austria) Red Bull Salzburg	Unknown
6 July 2016	FW	(Norway)	Mohamed Elyounoussi	(Switzerland) Basel	Unknown

=== Loans out ===
Date from	Date to	Position	Nationality	Name	To
8 February 2016	Season Long	DF	(Norway)	Ole Martin Rindarøy	Lillestrøm
18 March 2016	21 July 2016	MF	(Senegal)	Amidou Diop	Kristiansund
31 March 2016	22 July 2016	DF	(Finland)	Roni Peiponen	Åsane
31 March 2016	Season Long	MF	(Norway)	Thomas Kind Bendiksen	(Sweden) Elfsborg
22 July 2016	November 2017	DF	(Finland)	Roni Peiponen	(Finland) HJK
26 July 2016	Remaining season	MF	(Nigeria)	Thompson Ekpe	Kristiansund

=== Released ===
Date	Position	Nationality	Name	Joined	Date
5 December 2015	DF	(Norway)	Magne Simonsen	(Norway) Fredrikstad	1 February 2016
7 January 2016	MF	(Norway)	Harmeet Singh	(Denmark) Midtjylland	1 February 2016
7 January 2016	FW	(Norway)	Tommy Høiland	(Norway) Strømsgodset	18 February 2016
25 February 2016	MF	(Norway)	Daniel Berg Hestad	Retired	
1 June 2016	MF	(Liberia)	Dulee Johnson	(Norway) Start	23 July 2016
3 August 2016	FW	(Iceland)	Eiður Guðjohnsen	Retired	
8 September 2016	FW	(United States)	Ben Spencer	(Canada) Toronto FC II	8 September 2016
5 December 2016	MF	(Norway)	Thomas Kind Bendiksen	(Norway) Sandefjord	13 December 2016

=== Trial ===
Date From	Date To	Position	Nationality	Name	Last Club
11 January 2016			(Nigeria)	Samson Hussaini	
11 January 2016			(Nigeria)	Thompson Ekpe	
January 2016	9 February 2016	FW	(Cameroon)	Thomas Amang	Rainbow Sports Investment

== Friendlies ==
24 January 2016	Molde	0–1	Kristiansund	Molde
13:00 CET (UTC+1)		Summary	Kalludra 12'	Stadium: Aker Stadion

1 February 2016	Molde (Norway)	1–2	(Russia) Krylia Sovetov	Dubai, United Arab Emirates
14:00 CET (UTC+1)	Diouf	Summary	Rodić; Gabulov

5 February 2016	AIK (Sweden)	1–1	(Norway) Molde	Dubai, United Arab Emirates
17:00 CET (UTC+1)	Brustad 37'	Summary	Elyounoussi 78'	Stadium: The Sevens Stadium

9 February 2016	Molde (Norway)	1–2	(Sweden) IFK Göteborg	Dubai, United Arab Emirates
12:30 CET (UTC+1)	Svendsen 73'	Summary	Boman 41'; Johansson 70'	Stadium: The Sevens Stadium

1 March 2016	Molde	3–3	Mjøndalen	Molde
13:30 CET (UTC+1)	Diouf 42'; Agnaldo 47', 53'	Summary	Gauseth 29'; Boye 41'; Lindseth 60'	Stadium: Aker Stadion

5 March 2016	Molde	2–0	Aalesunds	Molde
14:00 CET (UTC+1)	Gulbrandsen (yellow card) 43' (goal) 59'; Agnaldo 72'; Peiponen (yellow card) 75'	Summary	Kirkeskov (yellow card) 33'; Skagestad (yellow card) 41'	Stadium: Aker Stadion

6 March 2016	Kristiansund	1–4	Molde	Kristiansund
14:00 CET (UTC+1)	D.Bamba 51'	Summary	Amang 69', 71'; B.Rahhaoui 88', 90'	Stadium: Atlanten Stadion

24 June 2016	Sarpsborg 08	5–1	Molde	Sarpsborg
17:30 CEST (UTC+2)	Kirkevold 8'; Tokstad 12' (yellow card) 33'; Mortensen 31', 57'; Kachi 81'	Summary	Rindarøy 27'; Flo (yellow card) 79'	Stadium: Sarpsborg Stadion

26 July 2016	Kristiansund	1–1	Molde	Kristiansund
17:35 CEST (UTC+2)	Kalludra 69'	Summary	Singh 72'	Stadium: Kristiansund Stadion

== Competitions ==
=== Tippeligaen ===
==== Results summary ====
Overall								Home						Away					
Pld	W	D	L	GF	GA	GD	Pts	W	D	L	GF	GA	GD	W	D	L	GF	GA	GD
30	13	6	11	48	42	+6	45	8	4	3	29	16	+13	5	2	8	19	26	−7

Last updated: 7 November 2016.
Source: see below

==== Results by round ====
Round	1	2	3	4	5	6	7	8	9	10	11	12	13	14	15	16	17	18	19	20	21	22	23	24	25	26	27	28	29	30
Ground	H	A	H	A	A	H	A	H	A	H	A	H	A	H	A	H	H	A	H	A	H	A	H	A	H	A	H	A	H	A
Result	D	W	W	D	W	W	L	W	D	W	L	W	L	L	L	D	L	L	W	W	W	W	D	L	L	W	D	L	W	L
Position	9	4	2	2	3	2	3	3	3	2	3	2	3	6	7	7	8	9	8	7	7	5	5	5	5	4	5	6	4	5

Updated to match(es) played on 7 November 2016. Source: see below
A = Away; H = Home; W = Win; D = Draw; L = Loss

==== Results ====
13 March 2016 1	Molde	1–1	Tromsø	Molde
15:30 CET (UTC+1)	Aursnes 1'; Hestad (yellow card) 41'	Summary	Nilsen (yellow card) 56'; Sigurðarson 70'	Stadium: Aker Stadion; Attendance: 7,745; Referee: Ola Hobber Nilsen

20 March 2016 2	Stabæk	1–2	Molde	Bærum
20:00 CET (UTC+1)	Meling 27'	Summary	Elyounoussi 66', 75'; Aursnes (yellow card) 83'; Svendsen (yellow card) 90+3'	Stadium: Nadderud Stadion; Attendance: 3,289; Referee: Svein Oddvar Moen

1 April 2016 3	Molde	4–2	Lillestrøm	Molde
19:00 CEST (UTC+2)	Singh (yellow card) 3', (goal) 45'; Moström 5'; Svendsen 31'; Hestad (yellow card) 33'; Guðjohnsen 65' (pen.)	Summary	Friday 16'; Mikalsen (yellow card) 39'; Knudtzon 56'; Faye-Lund (yellow card) 64'; Jradi (yellow card) 89'	Stadium: Aker Stadion; Attendance: 7,693; Referee: Dag Vidar Hafsås

10 April 2016 4	Start	1–1	Molde	Kristiansand
18:00 CEST (UTC+2)	Nwakali (yellow card) 60'; Kristjánsson (yellow card) 79'; Rasmussen 90+2'	Summary	Strand (yellow card) 27' (goal) 57'; Aursnes (yellow card) 38'; Svendsen (yellow card) 45'; Elyounoussi (yellow card) 54'	Stadium: Sør Arena; Attendance: 4,209; Referee: Espen Eskås

17 April 2016 5	Bodø/Glimt	1–2	Molde	Bodø
15:30 CEST (UTC+2)	Furebotn 1'; Babenko (yellow card) 66'	Summary	Amang 47'; Flo 52'; Singh (yellow card) 71' (yellow-red card) 86'; Hestad (yellow card) 86'	Stadium: Aspmyra Stadion; Attendance: 3,407; Referee: Tore Hansen

21 April 2016 6	Molde	4–0	Vålerenga	Molde
19:00 CEST (UTC+2)	Svendsen 15'; Bakenga 34'; Ssewankambo (yellow card) 45'; Strand 64'; Toivio 88'	Summary	Sakor (yellow card) 10'; Wæhler (yellow card) 29'; Larsen (yellow card) 90+1'	Stadium: Aker Stadion; Attendance: 7,775; Referee: Tommy Skjerven

24 April 2016 7	Sarpsborg 08	4–0	Molde	Sarpsborg
15:30 CEST (UTC+2)	Kirkevold 1', 54' (pen.); Rosted 25'; Trondsen (yellow card) 37'; Groven (yellow card) 87'; Hovda 89'	Summary	Elyounoussi (yellow card) 38'	Stadium: Sarpsborg Stadion; Attendance: 3,400; Referee: Kim Andre Johnsen

30 April 2016 8	Molde	1–0	Aalesund	Molde
18:00 CEST (UTC+2)	Forren (yellow card) 14'; Toivio (yellow card) 83'; Gulbrandsen 90+3'	Summary	A. Lie (yellow card) 6'; O. Lie (yellow card) 81'	Stadium: Aker Stadion; Attendance: 9,661; Referee: Svein Oddvar Moen

8 May 2016 9	Haugesund	3–3	Molde	Haugesund
20:00 CEST (UTC+2)	Stølås (yellow card) 25'; Andreassen 77'; Kiss 85' (pen.), 89'; Hajradinović (yellow card) 90+1'	Summary	Hestad 20'; Amang (yellow card) 44'; Strand 48'; Gulbrandsen 76'; Horvath (red card) 82'; Forren (yellow card) 90'	Stadium: Haugesund Stadion; Attendance: 4,784; Referee: Martin Lundby

11 May 2016 10	Molde	4–2	Strømsgodset	Molde
19:00 CEST (UTC+2)	Gulbrandsen 7'; Elyounoussi 22', 25'; Hestad (yellow card) 44'; Amang 63'	Summary	Moen (yellow card) 49' (goal) 62'; Nguen (yellow card) 50'; Kastrati 81'	Stadium: Aker Stadion; Attendance: 7,947; Referee: Trygve Kjensli

16 May 2016 11	Odd	2–0	Molde	Skien
18:00 CEST (UTC+2)	Occéan 60'; Zekhnini 71'	Summary	Elyounoussi (yellow card) 70'	Stadium: Skagerak Arena; Attendance: 10,678; Referee: Ola Hobber Nilsen

21 May 2016 12	Molde	2–0	Brann	Molde
18:00 CEST (UTC+2)	Aursnes 83' (pen.); Gulbrandsen 88'	Summary	Barmen (yellow card) 56'; Kristiansen (yellow card) 73'	Stadium: Aker Stadion; Attendance: 9,026; Referee: Dag Vidar Hafsås

28 May 2016 13	Rosenborg	3–1	Molde	Trondheim
20:00 CEST (UTC+2)	Helland 1'; Gytkjær 28', 45+1'	Summary	Elyounoussi 18'; Forren (yellow card) 31'; Aursnes (yellow card) 55'; Gabrielsen (yellow card) 79'	Stadium: Lerkendal Stadion; Attendance: 21,298; Referee: Svein Oddvar Moen

3 July 2016 14	Molde	0–1	Viking	Molde
18:00 CEST (UTC+2)	Diouf (yellow card) 55'	Summary	Danielsen (yellow card) 66'; Bringaker 71'; Haugen (yellow card) 72'	Stadium: Aker Stadion; Attendance: 8,211; Referee: Dag Vidar Hafsås

9 July 2016 15	Sogndal	4–3	Molde	Sogndalsfjøra
20:00 CEST (UTC+2)	Patronen 3'; Kjemhus 24', 50'; Sveen 30'; Teniste (yellow card) 67'; Opseth (yellow card) 84'	Summary	Toivio 21'; Singh 88', 90'	Stadium: Fosshaugane Campus; Attendance: 3,217; Referee: Tore Hansen

17 July 2016 16	Molde	2–2	Start	Molde
18:00 CEST (UTC+2)	Singh (yellow card) 7'; Svendsen 21'; Toivio 72'; Forren (yellow card) 90+1'	Summary	Børufsen 8' (yellow card) 60'; Kristjánsson 62' (yellow card) 67'; Nwakali (yellow card) 73'; Heikkilä (yellow card) 83'	Stadium: Aker Stadion; Attendance: 8,508; Referee: Espen Eskås

23 July 2016 17	Molde	0–1	Sarpsborg 08	Molde
18:00 CEST (UTC+2)		Summary	Tokstad 33' (yellow card) 42'	Stadium: Aker Stadion; Attendance: 8,832; Referee: Kai Erik Steen

1 August 2016 18	Vålerenga	3–0	Molde	Oslo
19:00 CEST (UTC+2)	Abdellaoue 9'; Larsen 16'; Sakor (yellow card) 30'; Zahid 76'	Summary		Stadium: Ullevaal Stadion; Attendance: 10,304; Referee: Svein-Erik Edvartsen

6 August 2016 19	Molde	3–2	Bodø/Glimt	Molde
15:30 CEST (UTC+2)	Aursnes 8'; Brustad 11'; Svendsen 50'	Summary	Berg 13'; Olsen (yellow card) 38' (goal) 66'; Konradsen (yellow card) 62'; Jonassen (yellow card) 87'	Stadium: Aker Stadion; Attendance: 7,929; Referee: Ola Hobber Nilsen

14 August 2016 20	Aalesunds	0–2	Molde	Ålesund
15:30 CEST (UTC+2)	Boli (yellow card) 52'; Riise (yellow card) 64'; Skagestad (yellow card) 81'	Summary	Brustad 42'; Hestad 55' (yellow card) 80'; Sigurðarson (yellow card) 89'	Stadium: Color Line Stadion; Attendance: 8,323; Referee: Tom Harald Hagen

21 August 2016 21	Molde	4–2	Odd	Molde
18:00 CEST (UTC+2)	Sigurðarson 13', 64'; Flo (yellow card) 72'; T.Svendsen 90+1'; Singh 90+7'	Summary	Ruud (yellow card) 38'; Hagen 72'; Bentley 82'; Zekhnini (yellow card) 90'	Stadium: Aker Stadion; Attendance: 8,075; Referee: Kim Andre Johnsen

27 August 2016 22	Strømsgodset	0–2	Molde	Drammen
15:30 CEST (UTC+2)	Høibråten (yellow card) 44'	Summary	Singh 32' (pen.); Sigurðarson 60'	Stadium: Marienlyst Stadion; Attendance: 6,783; Referee: Ola Hobber Nilsen

11 September 2016 23	Molde	0–0	Haugesund	Molde
20:00 CEST (UTC+2)		Summary	Hajradinović (yellow card) 25'; Tubić (yellow card) 54' (yellow-red card) 80'	Stadium: Aker Stadion; Attendance: 7,459; Referee: Tore Hansen

17 September 2016 24	Viking	1–0	Molde	Stavanger
18:00 CEST (UTC+2)	Pedersen 9'; Kronberg (yellow card) 89'	Summary	Aursnes (yellow card) 33'; Gabrielsen (yellow card) 59'	Stadium: Viking Stadion; Attendance: 9,681; Referee: Martin Lundby

24 September 2016 25	Molde	1–3	Rosenborg	Molde
18:00 CEST (UTC+2)	Sigurðarson 31'; Amang (yellow card) 81'; Hestad (yellow card) 87'	Summary	Jensen 50', 89'; Gytkjær 62'; Helland (yellow card) 90+3'	Stadium: Aker Stadion; Attendance: 11,348; Referee: Tom Harald Hagen

2 October 2016 26	Tromsø	0–2	Molde	Tromsø
18:00 CEST (UTC+2)	Johansen (yellow card) 77'	Summary	Gatt (yellow card) 42'; Gabrielsen (yellow card) 49'; Hestad 52'; Antonsen 79' (o.g.)	Stadium: Alfheim Stadion; Attendance: 3,348; Referee: Kristoffer Hagenes

16 October 2016 27	Molde	0–0	Sogndal	Molde
18:00 CEST (UTC+2)		Summary		Stadium: Aker Stadion; Attendance: 7,745; Referee: Trygve Kjensli

22 October 2016 28	Brann	2–1	Molde	Bergen
18:00 CEST (UTC+2)	Skålevik (yellow card) 10' (goal) 40', 58'; Demidov (yellow card) 16'	Summary	Sarr (yellow card) 29'; Strand 35'; Forren (yellow card) 59'	Stadium: Brann Stadion; Referee: Svein Oddvar Moen

30 October 2016 29	Molde	3–0	Stabæk	Molde
18:00 CEST (UTC+2)	Gatt 10'; Flo (yellow card) 41'; Toivio 47'	Summary	Omoijuanfo (yellow card) 56'	Stadium: Aker Stadion; Attendance: 8,140; Referee: Tore Hansen

6 November 2016 30	Lillestrøm	1–0	Molde	Lillestrøm
18:00 CEST (UTC+2)	Martin 71'; Innocent (yellow card) 80'	Summary	Flo (yellow card) 34'	Stadium: Åråsen Stadion; Attendance: 6,233; Referee: Ola Hobber Nilsen

==== Table ====
Pos	Team	Pld	W	D	L	GF	GA	GD	Pts	Qualification or relegation
3	Odd	30	15	6	9	44	35	+9	51	Qualification for the Europa League first qualifying round
4	Haugesund	30	12	10	8	47	43	+4	46	Qualification for the Europa League first qualifying round
5	Molde	30	13	6	11	48	42	+6	45	
6	Sarpsborg 08	30	12	9	9	35	37	−2	45	
7	Strømsgodset	30	12	8	10	44	40	+4	44	

Source: Football Association of Norway (in Norwegian), Soccerway
Rules for classification: 1) Points; 2) Goal difference; 3) Goals scored; 4) Head-to-head points; 5) Head-to-head goal difference; 6) Head-to-head away goals scored (between two teams).

=== Norwegian Cup ===
13 April 2016 First Round	Kristiansund	0–6	Molde	Kristiansund
18:00 CEST (UTC+2)	A.Havneraas (yellow card) 15' (yellow-red card) 57'; J.Klinge (yellow card) 24'; D.Dome (yellow card) 54'	Summary	Amang 17', 76', (yellow card) 62'; Bakenga 32', 78' (pen.), 85'; Ssewankambo (yellow card) 54'; Moström (yellow card) 61'; Strand 65'	Stadium: Gressbanen; Attendance: 1,272; Referee: Even Myrheim

27 April 2016 Second Round	Grorud	2–3	Molde	Oslo
18:00 CEST (UTC+2)	M.Can 28' (pen.); F.Kastrati 80'	Summary	Svendsen 32'; Diouf (yellow card) 33' (goal) 72'; Elyounoussi 67' (pen.)	Stadium: Grorud Matchbane; Attendance: 1,307; Referee: Henrik Andreas Grenå Pettersen

4 May 2016 Third Round	Stjørdals-Blink	2–1	Molde	Stjørdal
18:00 CEST (UTC+2)	J.Sollihaug 6'; T.Hønnås 79'	Summary	Amang 54'; M.O.Roseth (yellow card) 90+4'	Stadium: Øvrelands Minde; Attendance: 1,950; Referee: Kristoffer Hagenes

=== UEFA Europa League ===
==== Knockout phase ====
As winners of group A in the group stage, Molde were seeded for the Europa League round of 32 draw, along with the other group stage winners and the best four third-placed finishers in the Champions League group stage. The draw took place on 14 December 2015 and saw Molde drawn against two-time defending Europa League champions Sevilla, with the away tie taking place on 18 February and the home tie on 25 February 2016. Molde lost 0–3 away in Seville. In the second leg, Molde won 1–0 through a goal scored by Eirik Hestad in what became club legend Daniel Berg Hestad's 666th and final appearance for Molde. Molde exited the tournament, losing 1–3 on aggregate. Sevilla went on to win their third consecutive title in the competition.

18 February 2016 Round of 32 1st Leg	Sevilla (Spain)	3–0	(Norway) Molde	Seville, Spain
19:00 CET (UTC+1)	Llorente 35', 49'; Gameiro 72'	Summary	Gulbrandsen (yellow card) 10'; Diouf (yellow card) 12'	Stadium: Ramón Sánchez Pizjuán Stadium; Referee: Gediminas Mažeika (Lithuania)

25 February 2016 Round of 32 2nd Leg	Molde (Norway)	1–0 (1–3 agg.)	(Spain) Sevilla	Molde, Norway
21:05 CET (UTC+1)	E. Hestad 43'; Forren (yellow card) 66'	Report	Carriço (yellow card) 80'	Stadium: Aker Stadion; Attendance: 7,284; Referee: Bobby Madden (Scotland)

== Squad statistics ==
As of Match played 6 November 2016

=== Appearances and goals ===
No.	Pos	Nat	Player	Total		Tippeligaen		Norwegian Cup		Europa League	
No.	Pos	Nat	Player	Apps	Goals	Apps	Goals	Apps	Goals	Apps	Goals
1	GK	(United States) USA	Ethan Horvath	24	0	22	0	0	0	2	0
2	FW	(United States) USA	Joshua Gatt	6	1	5+1	1	0	0	0	0
3	MF	(Senegal) SEN	Amidou Diop	8	0	2+6	0	0	0	0	0
4	DF	(Norway) NOR	Ruben Gabrielsen	32	0	28+1	0	1	0	2	0
5	DF	(Finland) FIN	Joona Toivio	21	4	14+3	4	2	0	2	0
7	MF	(Norway) NOR	Harmeet Singh	27	5	23+3	5	1	0	0	0
8	MF	(Senegal) SEN	Babacar Sarr	13	0	13	0	0	0	0	0
9	MF	(Sweden) SWE	Mattias Moström	23	1	17+3	1	1	0	2	0
10	FW	(Iceland) ISL	Björn Bergmann Sigurðarson	11	4	10+1	4	0	0	0	0
11	FW	(Norway) NOR	Sander Svendsen	29	4	14+11	3	2	1	1+1	0
14	MF	(Norway) NOR	Petter Strand	32	5	26+3	4	0+2	1	0+1	0
15	DF	(Norway) NOR	Per-Egil Flo	24	2	21	2	1	0	2	0
17	MF	(Norway) NOR	Fredrik Aursnes	27	3	21+2	3	0+2	0	2	0
19	MF	(Norway) NOR	Eirik Hestad	26	4	17+4	3	2+1	0	1+1	1
20	FW	(Cameroon) CMR	Thomas Amang	24	5	3+19	2	1+1	3	0	0
21	MF	(Brazil) BRA	Agnaldo	11	0	1+6	0	3	0	0+1	0
22	DF	(Denmark) DEN	Christoffer Remmer	9	0	9	0	0	0	0	0
23	DF	(Norway) NOR	Knut Olav Rindarøy	14	0	10+1	0	3	0	0	0
25	DF	(Norway) NOR	Vegard Forren	26	0	22+1	0	1	0	2	0
26	GK	(Sweden) SWE	Andreas Linde	12	0	8+1	0	3	0	0	0
28	MF	(Norway) NOR	Stian Rode Gregersen	7	0	4+3	0	0	0	0	0
30	FW	(Senegal) SEN	Pape Paté Diouf	5	1	2	0	2	1	1	0
32	DF	(Sweden) SWE	Isak Ssewankambo	11	0	7+2	0	1+1	0	0	0
33	FW	(Norway) NOR	Fredrik Brustad	9	2	6+3	2	0	0	0	0
51	DF	(Norway) NOR	Kristian Strande	3	0	0	0	2	0	0+1	0
52	MF	(Norway) NOR	Tobias Svendsen	5	1	0+4	1	1	0	0	0
53	DF	(Norway) NOR	Martin Ove Roseth	2	0	0+1	0	1	0	0	0
Players away from Molde on loan:
13	MF	(Nigeria) NGR	Thompson Ekpe	3	0	0	0	2+1	0	0	0
Players who appeared for Molde no longer at the club:
6	MF	(Norway) NOR	Daniel Berg Hestad	2	0	0	0	0	0	2	0
8	FW	(Norway) NOR	Fredrik Gulbrandsen	11	4	6+3	4	1	0	1	0
16	MF	(Liberia) LBR	Dulee Johnson	1	0	0	0	1	0	0	0
22	FW	(Iceland) ISL	Eiður Guðjohnsen	12	1	6+6	1	0	0	0	0
24	FW	(Norway) NOR	Mohamed Elyounoussi	15	5	11+1	4	0+1	1	2	0
27	FW	(Norway) NOR	Mushaga Bakenga	3	4	2	1	1	3	0	0

=== Goal scorers ===
Rank	Pos.	No.	Player	Tippeligaen	Norwegian Cup	Europa League	Total
1	FW	24	(Norway) Mohamed Elyounoussi	5	1	0	6
2	MF	7	(Norway) Harmeet Singh	5	0	0	5
2	FW	11	(Norway) Sander Svendsen	4	1	0	5
2	MF	14	(Norway) Petter Strand	4	1	0	5
2	FW	20	(Cameroon) Thomas Amang	2	3	0	5
6	FW	8	(Norway) Fredrik Gulbrandsen	4	0	0	4
6	FW	10	(Iceland) Björn Bergmann Sigurðarson	4	0	0	4
6	DF	5	(Finland) Joona Toivio	4	0	0	4
6	MF	19	(Norway) Eirik Hestad	3	0	1	4
6	FW	27	(Norway) Mushaga Bakenga	1	3	0	4
11	MF	17	(Norway) Fredrik Aursnes	3	0	0	3
12	FW	33	(Norway) Fredrik Brustad	2	0	0	2
12	DF	15	(Norway) Per-Egil Flo	2	0	0	2
14	MF	9	(Sweden) Mattias Moström	1	0	0	1
14	FW	22	(Iceland) Eiður Guðjohnsen	1	0	0	1
14	MF	52	(Norway) Tobias Svendsen	1	0	0	1
14	FW	2	(United States) Joshua Gatt	1	0	0	1
14	FW	30	(Senegal) Pape Paté Diouf	0	1	0	1
			Own goal	1	0	0	1
TOTALS				48	10	1	59

=== Disciplinary record ===
Number	Nation	Position	Name	Tippeligaen		Norwegian Cup		Europa League		Total	
Number	Nation	Position	Name	Yellow card	Red card	Yellow card	Red card	Yellow card	Red card	Yellow card	Red card
1	(United States)	GK	Ethan Horvath	0	1	0	0	0	0	0	1
2	(United States)	FW	Joshua Gatt	1	0	0	0	0	0	1	0
4	(Norway)	DF	Ruben Gabrielsen	3	0	0	0	0	0	3	0
5	(Finland)	DF	Joona Toivio	1	0	0	0	0	0	1	0
7	(Norway)	MF	Harmeet Singh	4	1	0	0	0	0	4	1
8	(Norway)	FW	Fredrik Gulbrandsen	0	0	0	0	1	0	1	0
8	(Senegal)	MF	Babacar Sarr	1	0	0	0	0	0	1	0
9	(Norway)	MF	Mattias Moström	0	0	1	0	0	0	1	0
10	(Iceland)	FW	Björn Bergmann Sigurðarson	1	0	0	0	0	0	1	0
11	(Norway)	FW	Sander Svendsen	2	0	0	0	0	0	2	0
14	(Norway)	MF	Petter Strand	1	0	0	0	0	0	1	0
15	(Norway)	DF	Per-Egil Flo	2	0	0	0	0	0	2	0
17	(Norway)	MF	Fredrik Aursnes	4	0	0	0	0	0	4	0
19	(Norway)	MF	Eirik Hestad	6	0	0	0	0	0	6	0
20	(Cameroon)	FW	Thomas Amang	2	0	1	0	0	0	3	0
24	(Norway)	FW	Mohamed Elyounoussi	3	0	0	0	0	0	3	0
25	(Norway)	DF	Vegard Forren	5	0	0	0	1	0	6	0
30	(Senegal)	FW	Pape Paté Diouf	1	0	1	0	1	0	3	0
32	(Sweden)	DF	Isak Ssewankambo	1	0	1	0	0	0	2	0
53	(Norway)	DF	Martin Ove Roseth	0	0	1	0	0	0	1	0
			TOTALS	38	2	5	0	3	0	46	2

== See also ==
- Molde FK seasons
