= Thompson Ekpe =

Nigerian footballer

Personal information
- Full name: Thompson Unachi Ekpe
- Date of birth: 14 December 1996 (age 29)
- Place of birth: Nigeria
- Height: 1.87 m (6 ft 1 1/2 in)
- Position: Striker

Team information
- Current team: KenGold SC
- Number: 17

Senior career*
Years	Team	Apps	(Gls)
2016–2017	Molde	0	(0)
2016–2017	→ Kristiansund (loan)	12	(0)
2017–2018	Arendal	34	(1)
2019–2021	Kristiansund 2	11	(3)
2021–2025	Nassirya		
- * Club domestic league appearances and goals

Thompson Unachi Ekpe (born 14 December 1996) is a Nigerian professional footballer who plays for KenGold SC.

== Career ==
=== Molde FK ===
On 23 March 2016 Ekpe joined Molde FK on a three-year contract.

On 26 July 2016, Ekpe joined Kristiansund BK on loan for the rest of the 2016 season. Ekpe returned to Kristiansund on 9 March 2017 on loan until 31 July 2017.

=== Arendal ===
On 19 July 2017, Ekpe moved to Arendal on a permanent transfer. Ekpe left the club at the end of the 2018 season.

== Career statistics ==
=== Club ===
As of match played 5 November 2017

Appearances and goals by club, season and competition
Club	Season	League			National Cup		Continental		Other		Total	
Club	Season	Division	Apps	Goals	Apps	Goals	Apps	Goals	Apps	Goals	Apps	Goals
Molde	2016	Eliteserien	0	0	3	0	0	0	-		3	0
Molde	2017	Eliteserien	0	0	0	0	-		-		0	0
Molde	Total		0	0	3	0	-	-	-	-	3	0
Kristiansund (loan)	2016	OBOS-ligaen	6	0	0	0	-		-		6	0
Kristiansund (loan)	2017	Eliteserien	6	0	1	0	-		-		7	0
Kristiansund (loan)	Total		12	0	1	0	-	-	-	-	13	0
Arendal	2017	OBOS-ligaen	13	1	0	0	–		–		13	0
