= Agnaldo Moraes =

Brazilian footballer (born 1994)

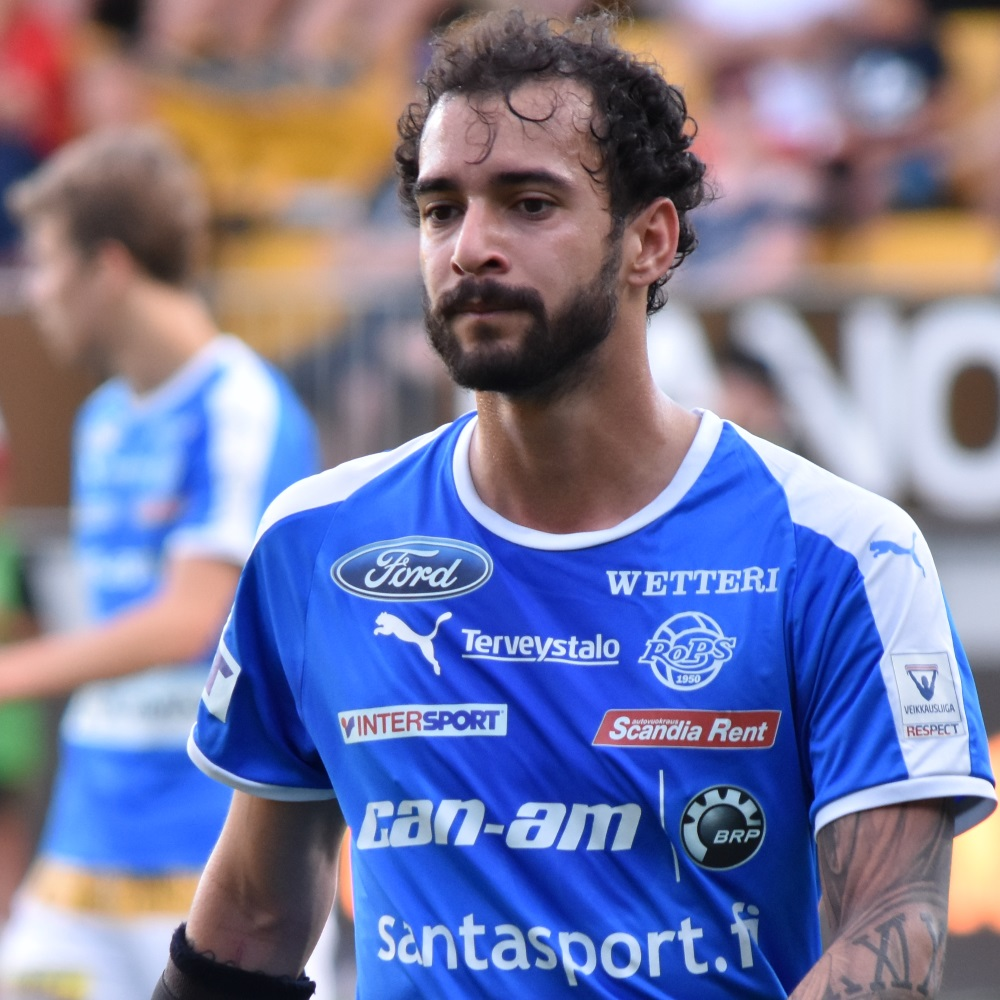
- Agnaldo with RoPS in 2018.

Personal information
- Full name: Agnaldo Pinto de Moraes Júnior
- Date of birth: 11 March 1994 (age 32)
- Place of birth: São Gonçalo, Brazil
- Height: 1.75 m (5 ft 9 in)
- Position: Midfielder

Youth career
- Flamengo

Senior career*
Years	Team	Apps	(Gls)
2010–2014	Desportivo Brasil		
2013–2014	→ Molde (loan)	7	(1)
2014–2019	Molde	37	(1)
2017	→ Vila Nova (loan)	3	(0)
2018	→ RoPS (loan)	21	(3)
2019	RoPS	19	(0)
2020–2021	Kastrioti	33	(0)
2021–2022	Skënderbeu	21	(0)
2022–2023	Kukësi	7	(0)
2023	Skënderbeu	9	(0)
- * Club domestic league appearances and goals as of 19 May 2023

Agnaldo Pinto de Moraes Júnior, commonly known as Moraes Jr. or Agnaldo Moraes (born 11 March 1994), is a Brazilian footballer who plays as a midfielder.

== Career ==
=== Early career ===
Moraes started his career with Desportivo Brasil who played in Campeonato Paulista Série B, the fourth level of the São Paulo state professional football championship. In 2011 Agnaldo spent time visiting and training with Manchester United. Moraes also played in a couple of friendlies for a Manchester United XI against Forest Green Rovers in June 2013, scoring 1 of the 2 goals in the 2–2 draw, and against Peterborough United in August 2012, again scoring one of the goals.

=== Molde FK ===
In March 2013 Moraes signed on a season-long loan for Norwegian Premier League side Molde.

Moraes' first appearance for Molde was in the Norwegian Cup first round match against Elnesvågen in which he also scored his first goal for the club. His first league appearance for Molde was against Hønefoss on 25 May 2013, in which he came on as a 59th minute Substitute for Josh Gatt. Moraes scored his first league goal for Molde in the 91st minute of their 3–3 draw away to Vålerenga on 22 June 2013.

=== RoPS (loan) ===
On 30 January 2018, RoPS announced the signing of Moraes on a season-long loan deal.

== Career statistics ==
=== Club ===
As of match played 30 May 2021

Appearances and goals by club, season and competition
Club	Season	League			National Cup		Continental		Other		Total	
Club	Season	Division	Apps	Goals	Apps	Goals	Apps	Goals	Apps	Goals	Apps	Goals
Molde (loan)	2013	Tippeligaen	7	1	5	3	3	0	–		15	4
Molde	2014	Tippeligaen	16	0	4	1	4	1	–		24	2
Molde	2015	Tippeligaen	14	1	5	2	1	0	–		20	3
Molde	2016	Tippeligaen	7	0	3	0	1	0	–		11	0
Molde	2017	Eliteserien	0	0	0	0	–		–		0	0
Molde	2018	Eliteserien	0	0	0	0	0	0	–		0	0
Molde	Total		37	1	12	3	6	1	-	-	55	5
Vila Nova (loan)	2017	Série B	3	0	1	0	–		7 (Note: Includes Campeonato Goiano)	1	11	1
RoPS (loan)	2018	Veikkausliiga	20	3	4	2	–		–		24	5
RoPS	2019	Veikkausliiga	19	0	4	0	1	0	–		24	0
KS Kastrioti	2020–21	Kategoria Superiore	33	0	1	0	–		1	0	35	0
Skënderbeu	2021–22	Kategoria Superiore	21	0	3	1	–		–		24	1
Kukësi	2022–23	Kategoria Superiore	7	0	1	1	–		–		8	1
Skënderbeu	2023–24	Kategoria Superiore	9	0	1	0	–		–		10	0
Career total			156	5	32	10	10	1	8	1	206	17

== Honours ==
Molde FK

- Tippeligaen (1): 2014
- NM Cupen (2): 2013, 2014
