= Petter Strand =

Norwegian footballer (born 1994)

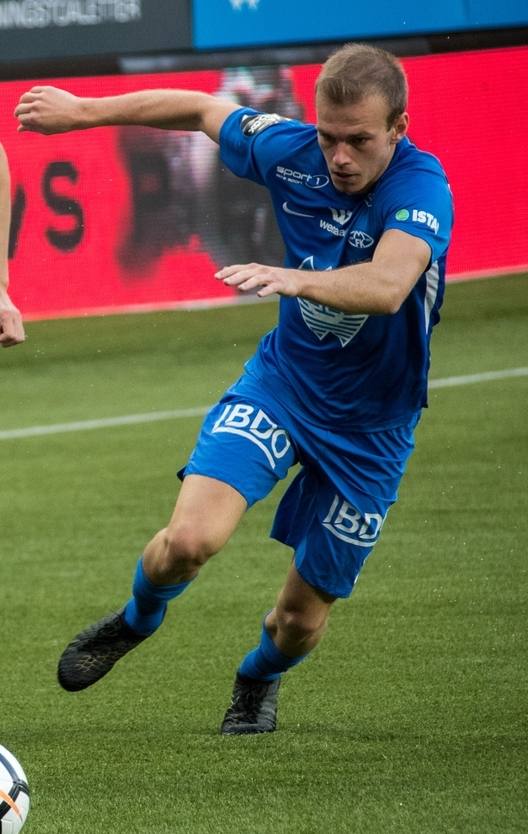
- Strand with Molde in 2018

Personal information
- Full name: Petter Dahle Strand
- Date of birth: 24 August 1994 (age 32)
- Place of birth: Bergen, Norway
- Height: 1.75 m (5 ft 9 in)
- Position: Midfielder

Team information
- Current team: Vålerenga
- Number: 24

Senior career*
Years	Team	Apps	(Gls)
2013	Fyllingsdalen	5	(1)
2014–2016	Sogndal	55	(4)
2016–2018	Molde	76	(7)
2019–2021	Brann	78	(9)
2022–	Vålerenga	127	(13)

International career^{‡}
2014–2016	Norway U21	13	(2)
- * Club domestic league appearances and goals as of 23 July 2026 ‡ National team caps and goals as of 18 June 2017

Petter Strand (born 24 August 1994) is a Norwegian footballer who plays as a midfielder for Vålerenga. He has previously played for Fyllingsdalen, Sogndal, Molde and Brann.

== Career ==
Strand joined Sogndal in 2014. He made his debut for Sogndal in a 3–0 defeat against Stabæk.

On 28 January 2016, Strand joined Molde FK. He made his Molde debut in a 2–1 win against Stabæk on 20 March 2016.

On 14 January 2019, Strand joined SK Brann on a free transfer.

== Career statistics ==
As of 13 July 2025

Appearances and goals by club, season and competition
Club	Season	League			National Cup		Continental		Total	
Club	Season	Division	Apps	Goals	Apps	Goals	Apps	Goals	Apps	Goals
Fyllingsdalen	2013	2. divisjon	5	1	0	0	—		5	1
Sogndal	2014	Eliteserien	29	1	2	0	—		31	2
Sogndal	2015	OBOS-ligaen	26	3	2	0	—		28	3
Sogndal	Total		55	4	4	0	—	—	59	4
Molde	2016	Eliteserien	29	4	2	1	1	0	32	5
Molde	2017	Eliteserien	21	2	4	0	—		25	2
Molde	2018	Eliteserien	26	1	1	0	8	1	35	2
Molde	Total		76	7	7	1	9	1	92	9
Brann	2019	Eliteserien	21	3	3	1	2	0	26	4
Brann	2020	Eliteserien	30	5	0	0	—		30	5
Brann	2021	Eliteserien	27	1	0	0	—		27	1
Brann	Total		78	9	3	1	2	0	83	10
Vålerenga	2022	Eliteserien	29	0	2	0	—		31	0
Vålerenga	2023	Eliteserien	30	2	5	0	—		35	2
Vålerenga	2024	OBOS-ligaen	27	6	4	0	—		31	6
Vålerenga	2025	Eliteserien	12	2	0	0	—		12	2
Vålerenga	Total		98	10	11	0	—	—	109	10
Career total			312	31	25	2	11	1	348	34
