= Andreas Linde =

Swedish footballer

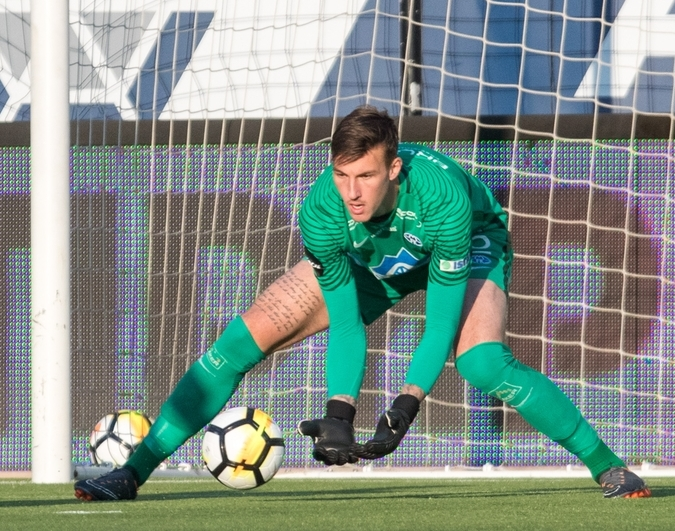
- Linde with Molde in 2018

Personal information
- Full name: Andreas Christopher Linde
- Date of birth: 24 July 1993 (age 33)
- Place of birth: Glumslöv, Sweden
- Height: 1.96 m (6 ft 5 in)
- Position: Goalkeeper

Team information
- Current team: Häcken
- Number: 1

Youth career
- –2007: Rydebäcks IF
- 2008–2012: Helsingborgs IF

Senior career*
Years	Team	Apps	(Gls)
2011–2015	Helsingborgs IF	2	(0)
2013	→ IFK Värnamo (loan)	0	(0)
2013	→ HIF Akademi (loan)	11	(0)
2015–2021	Molde	138	(0)
2022–2024	Greuther Fürth	43	(0)
2024–	Häcken	30	(0)

International career^{‡}
2010	Sweden U17	2	(0)
2011–2013	Sweden U19	5	(0)
2013–2016	Sweden U21/O	8	(0)
2017	Sweden	1	(0)
Medal record
Men's football
Representing Sweden
UEFA European Under-21 Championship
Winner	2015 Czech Republic
- * Club domestic league appearances and goals as of 8 July 2026 ‡ National team caps and goals as of 17:20, 10 January 2022 (UTC)

Andreas Christopher Linde (born 24 July 1993) is a Swedish professional footballer who plays as a goalkeeper for Allsvenskan club Häcken.

== Club career ==
=== Early career ===
Linde was born in Glumslöv. At the age of 14, he joined Helsingborgs IF from Rydebäcks IF.

=== Molde ===
Linde signed for Norwegian club Molde in 2015, having agreed a two-year contract with the club. In December 2016, Molde extended his contract till the end of the 2019 season. On 21 July 2015, Linde made his debut for the club in Molde's 5–0 win against Armenian side Pyunik in the 2015–16 UEFA Europa League second qualifying round, second leg. He was sent off in the 72nd minute of his league debut for Molde against Odd on 9 August 2015. Molde led the game 2–1 when Linde fouled an Odd player and gave away a penalty. The match ended with a 2–2 draw. In May, he injured his knee and had to go through surgery.

On 12 July 2019, Molde announced that Linde's contract had been extended till the end of the 2021 season. He returned to the first team squad on 23 September 2019, in a match against Stabæk, and placed in the starting XI on 6 October against Brann. He kept a clean sheet in a goalless draw at Brann Stadion, his first league game since 20 May.

=== Greuther Fürth ===
On 10 January 2022, Linde signed a contract with German club Greuther Fürth until 30 June 2024.

=== Häcken ===
On 31 January 2024, Linde was announced at Häcken on a three-year contract.

== International career ==
Linde was part of the Sweden U21 team that won the 2015 UEFA European Under-21 Championship, serving as a backup goalkeeper behind Patrik Carlgren.

He represented the Sweden Olympic team at the 2016 Summer Olympics in Rio de Janeiro, and played in all three games as Sweden failed to advance from the group stage.

On 12 January 2017, he made his full international debut for Sweden in a 6–0 friendly win against Slovakia.

== Career statistics ==
=== Club ===
As of match played 31 October 2023

Appearances and goals by club, season and competition
Club	Season	League			National Cup		Continental		Total	
Club	Season	Division	Apps	Goals	Apps	Goals	Apps	Goals	Apps	Goals
Helsingborg	2011	Allsvenskan	0	0	0	0	—		0	0
Helsingborg	2012	Allsvenskan	0	0	0	0	0	0	0	0
Helsingborg	2013	Allsvenskan	0	0	0	0	0	0	0	0
Helsingborg	2014	Allsvenskan	2	0	1	0	—		3	0
Helsingborg	Total		2	0	1	0	0	0	3	0
IFK Värnamo (loan)	2013	Superettan	0	0	2	0	—		2	0
HIF Akademi (loan)	2013	Division 2	11	0	0	0	—		11	0
Molde	2015	Tippeligaen	2	0	1	0	1 (Note: Appearance(s) in the UEFA Champions League.)	0	4	0
Molde	2016	Tippeligaen	9	0	3	0	0	0	12	0
Molde	2017	Eliteserien	30	0	5	0	—		35	0
Molde	2018	Eliteserien	29	0	1	0	8 (Note: Appearances in the UEFA Europa League.)	0	38	0
Molde	2019	Eliteserien	16	0	0	0	0	0	16	0
Molde	2020	Eliteserien	27	0	0	0	11 (Note: Appearances in the UEFA Champions League and UEFA Europa League.)	0	38	0
Molde	2021	Eliteserien	25	0	1	0	4	0	30	0
Molde	Total		138	0	11	0	23	0	172	0
Greuther Fürth	2021–22	Bundesliga	12	0	0	0	—		12	0
Greuther Fürth	2022–23	2. Bundesliga	30	0	0	0	—		30	0
Greuther Fürth	2023–24	2. Bundesliga	1	0	1	0	—		2	0
Greuther Fürth	Total		43	0	1	0	—		44	0
Career total			196	0	15	0	23	0	234	0

=== International ===
Appearances and goals by national team and year
National team	Year	Apps	Goals
Sweden	2017	1	0
Total		1	0

== Honours ==
Molde

- Eliteserien: 2019

Sweden U21

- UEFA European Under-21 Championship: 2015
