= Roni Peiponen =

Finnish footballer (1997–2022)

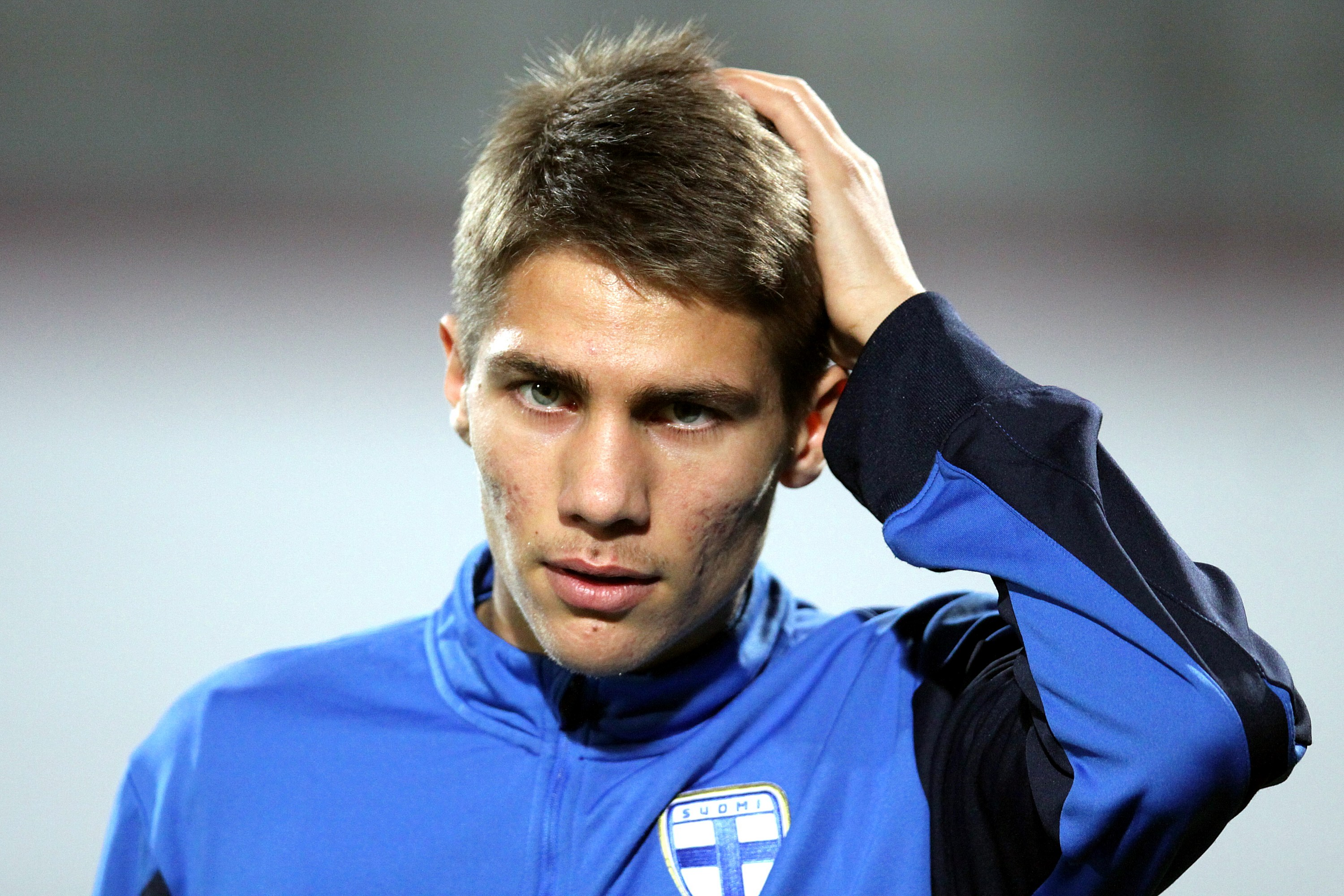
- Peiponen in 2015 with Finland U21

Personal information
- Date of birth: 9 April 1997
- Place of birth: Kuopio, Finland
- Date of death: 25 November 2022 (aged 25)
- Height: 1.75 m (5 ft 9 in)
- Position: Right-back

Youth career
- –2004: PETO
- 2005–2014: HJK

Senior career*
| Years | Team | Apps | (Gls) |
| 2014 | Klubi 04 | 5 | (0) |
| 2015 | HJK | 17 | (1) |
| 2015–2017 | Molde | 0 | (0) |
| 2016 | → Åsane (loan) | 14 | (0) |
| 2016 | → HJK (loan) | 11 | (0) |
| 2017 | → Klubi 04 (loan) | 2 | (0) |
| 2018–2020 | HJK | 22 | (1) |
| 2022 | MPS | 7 | (7) |

International career
| 2012 | Finland U15 | 6 | (2) |
| 2013 | Finland U16 | 13 | (1) |
| 2013 | Finland U17 | 2 | (0) |
| 2014–2015 | Finland U18 | 18 | (2) |
| 2015 | Finland U19 | 8 | (1) |
| 2016 | Finland U21 | 1 | (0) |
- * Club domestic league appearances and goals

Roni Benjam Peiponen (9 April 1997 – 25 November 2022) was a Finnish professional footballer who played as a right-back. He retired in July 2020.

== Club career ==
=== Molde ===
In November 2015, Peiponen moved from HJK Helsinki to Norwegian side Molde FK on a three-and-a-half-year contract. On 1 April 2016, he was loaned to Åsane on loan from Molde. Following a successful loan spell at Åsane, he headed back to HJK Helsinki on loan until November 2017.

Peiponen retired from professional football aged 23 in July 2020 after dealing with persistent injuries. However, he returned to the sport in 2022.

== Personal life and death ==
In 2020, Peiponen revealed that he had fallen ill with depression and took medication for sleep problems.

On 1 December 2022, it was announced that Peiponen had died at the age of 25.

== Career statistics ==
Appearances and goals by club, season and competition
| Club | Season | League | | | National cup | | League cup | | Continental | | Total | |
| Club | Season | Division | Apps | Goals | Apps | Goals | Apps | Goals | Apps | Goals | Apps | Goals |
|---|---|---|---|---|---|---|---|---|---|---|---|---|
| Klubi 04 | 2014 | Kakkonen | 4 | 0 | — | | — | | — | | 4 | 0 |
| Klubi 04 | 2015 | Kakkonen | 1 | 0 | — | | — | | — | | 1 | 0 |
| Klubi 04 | Total | | 5 | 0 | 0 | 0 | 0 | 0 | 0 | 0 | 5 | 0 |
| HJK | 2014 | Veikkausliiga | 0 | 0 | 0 | 0 | 3 | 0 | — | | 3 | 0 |
| HJK | 2015 | Veikkausliiga | 17 | 1 | 2 | 0 | 4 | 0 | 3 | 0 | 26 | 1 |
| HJK | Total | | 17 | 1 | 2 | 0 | 7 | 0 | 3 | 0 | 29 | 1 |
| Molde | 2016 | Tippeligaen | 0 | 0 | 0 | 0 | — | | — | | 0 | 0 |
| Åsane (loan) | 2016 | 1. divisjon | 14 | 0 | 1 | 0 | — | | — | | 15 | 0 |
| HJK (loan) | 2016 | Veikkausliiga | 11 | 0 | 1 | 0 | — | | — | | 12 | 0 |
| Klubi 04 (loan) | 2017 | Kakkonen | 2 | 0 | — | | — | | — | | 2 | 0 |
| HJK | 2018 | Veikkausliiga | 11 | 1 | 1 | 0 | — | | 2 | 0 | 14 | 1 |
| HJK | 2019 | Veikkausliiga | 11 | 0 | 4 | 0 | — | | 0 | 0 | 15 | 0 |
| HJK | 2020 | Veikkausliiga | 0 | 0 | 1 | 0 | — | | 4 | 0 | 5 | 0 |
| HJK | Total | | 22 | 1 | 6 | 0 | 0 | 0 | 6 | 0 | 34 | 1 |
| MPS | 2022 | Kolmonen | 7 | 7 | 2 | 1 | — | | — | | 9 | 8 |
| Career total | | | 78 | 9 | 12 | 1 | 7 | 0 | 9 | 0 | 106 | 10 |
