= Knut Olav Rindarøy =

Norwegian footballer (born 1985)

Personal information
- Date of birth: 17 July 1985 (age 41)
- Place of birth: Molde, Norway
- Height: 1.78 m (5 ft 10 in)
- Position: Left back

Youth career
- Gossen

Senior career*
Years	Team	Apps	(Gls)
2004–2017	Molde	211	(2)
2010–2011	→ Deportivo La Coruña (loan)	4	(0)

International career^{‡}
2004	Norway U19	7	(0)
2006	Norway U21	3	(0)
2009–2010	Norway	2	(0)
Medal record
Molde
Winner	Norwegian Football Cup	2005
Winner	Tippeligaen	2011
Winner	Tippeligaen	2012
Winner	Norwegian Football Cup	2013
Winner	Tippeligaen	2014
- * Club domestic league appearances and goals as of 4 December 2017 ‡ National team caps and goals as of 27 September 2012

Knut Olav Rindarøy (born 17 July 1985) is a Norwegian former footballer who played for Molde, Deportivo La Coruña and the Norwegian National Team.

== Club career ==
Rindarøy began his career with Molde FK in 2003 and appeared in over 200 league matches with the Norwegian club. His play with the club led to interest from various top European sides. On 18 January 2010, Skysports.com reported that Rindarøy was travelling to England for trials with Everton, Nottingham Forest, and Manchester United – which was confirmed by Molde director Tarje Nordstrand Jacobsen. On 20 August 2010 it was reported that he has signed with Spain's Deportivo La Coruña. Rindarøy made his debut for Deportivo La Coruña against Almeria on 26 September 2010.

On 29 November 2017, Rindarøy announced his retirement from football due to injuries.

== Career statistics ==
=== Club ===
As of match played 13 May 2017

Appearances and goals by club, season and competition
Club	Season	League			National Cup		Continental		Other		Total	
Club	Season	Division	Apps	Goals	Apps	Goals	Apps	Goals	Apps	Goals	Apps	Goals
Molde	2004	Tippeligaen	5	0	0	0	—		—		5	0
Molde	2005	Tippeligaen	4	0	0	0	—		—		4	0
Molde	2006	Tippeligaen	20	0	2	1	—		—		22	1
Molde	2007	Adeccoligaen	25	1	0	0	—		—		25	1
Molde	2008	Tippeligaen	23	0	4	0	—		—		27	0
Molde	2009	Tippeligaen	29	1	4	0	—		—		33	1
Molde	2010	Tippeligaen	15	0	2	0	4	1	—		21	1
Molde	2011	Tippeligaen	12	0	2	0	—		—		14	0
Molde	2012	Tippeligaen	26	0	4	0	9	0	—		38	0
Molde	2013	Tippeligaen	18	0	3	1	4	0	—		25	1
Molde	2014	Tippeligaen	7	0	2	0	1	0	—		10	0
Molde	2015	Tippeligaen	11	0	5	0	8	0	—		24	0
Molde	2016	Tippeligaen	11	0	3	0	0	0	—		14	0
Molde	2017	Eliteserien	5	0	1	0	—		—		6	0
Molde	Total		211	2	32	2	26	1	—	—	269	5
Deportivo La Coruña (loan)	2010–11	La Liga	4	0	0	0	—		—		4	0
Career total			215	2	32	2	26	1	—	—	273	5

=== International ===
Norway national team
Year	Apps	Goals
2009	1	0
2010	1	0
Total	2	0

Statistics accurate as of match played 12 October 2010

== Honours ==
Molde

- Tippeligaen (3): 2011, 2012, 2014
- Norwegian Football Cup (2): 2005, 2013
