= 2009 Norwegian Football Cup final =

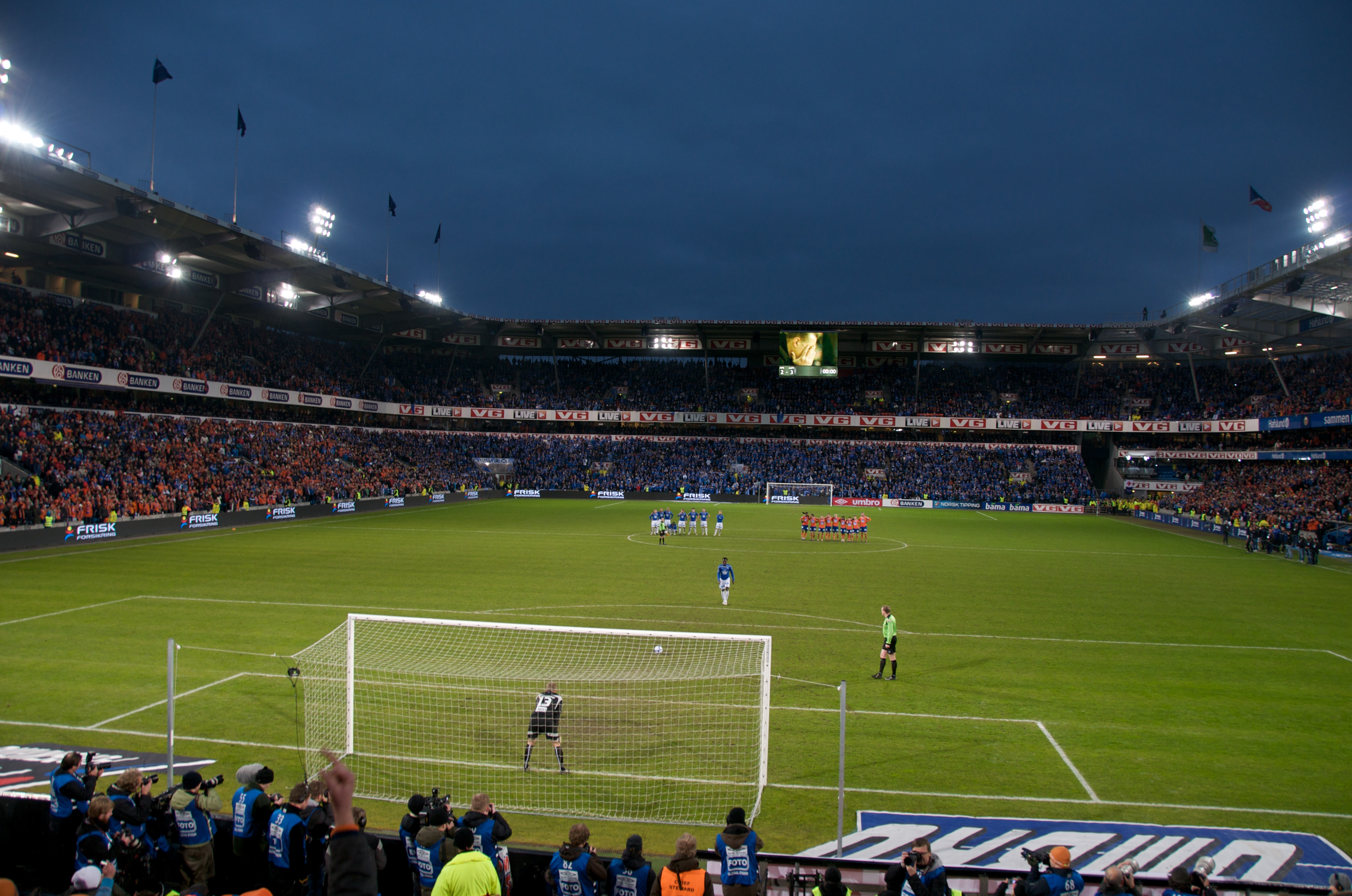
- The penalty shootout
- Event: 2009 Norwegian Football Cup
Molde	Aalesund
2	2
- Aalesund won 5–4 on penalties
- Date: 8 November 2009
- Venue: Ullevaal Stadion, Oslo
- Referee: Kristoffer Helgerud
- Attendance: 25,109

The 2009 Norwegian Football Cup final was played between Molde FK and Aalesunds FK on 8 November 2009 on Ullevaal Stadion in Oslo, Norway. With both clubs hailing from Møre og Romsdal, the match was dubbed as a local derby between the league silver medalists from Molde and the pride of Ålesund, who ended up as number four from the bottom in the league.

Molde played their fifth cup final, having won in 1994 and 2005, while Aalesund played their first cup final and had the chance to win the club's first trophy ever. Molde's captain Daniel Berg Hestad was a part of both the 1994 and the 2005 winning teams, while Knut Dørum Lillebakk, Øyvind Gjerde and Marcus Andreasson became cup champions in 2005. Both Glenn Roberts and Fredrik Carlsen had the chance to win their second straight cup after winning it with Vålerenga in 2008.

== Route to the final ==
Molde		Round	Aalesund	
Tornado Måløy (D3); A 8–1	Biram Diouf 9', 36', 58', Steen 48', Skjølsvik 80', Ertsås 86', Moström 88', Forren 90'	First round	Brattvåg (D3); A 5–0	Silva 17', 55', Arnefjord 35', 53', Mathisen 90'
Hødd (D2); A 2–0	Biram Diouf 63', 73'	Second round	Kristiansund (D2); A 2–0	Arneng 49', Larsen 68'
Kongsvinger (D1); A 1–0	Ertsås 80'	Third round	Stavanger (D1); H 2–1	Roberts 50', Aarøy 53'
Alta (D1); A 1–0	Skjølsvik 71'	Fourth round	Sogndal (D1); A 1–0	Mathisen 56
Rosenborg (TL); H 5–0	Biram Diouf 10', Berg Hestad 52', Hoseth 57', Paté Diouf 74', Mota 83'	Quarter-final	Stabæk (TL); H 3–1	Parr 35', Jalasto 78', Stephenson 85'
Vålerenga (TL); H 6–3 aet	Hoseth 78', Paté Diouf 84', 95', Thioune 105', 119', Moström 120'	Semi-final	Odd Grenland (TL); H 1–0	Aarøy 60'

- (TL) = Tippeligaen team
- (D1) = 1. divisjon team
- (D2) = 2. divisjon team
- (D3) = 3. divisjon team

== Match ==
=== Details ===
8 November 2009
13:15 CET (UTC+1)

Molde	2–2 (a.e.t.)	Aalesund
Biram Diouf 27', 96'	Report	Roberts 54'; Aarøy 114'
Penalties
Mota (penalty missed); Thioune (penalty scored); Forren (penalty scored); Steen (penalty scored); Paté Diouf (penalty scored)	4–5	(penalty scored) Stephenson; (penalty scored) Arneng; (penalty scored) Herrera; (penalty scored) Phillips; (penalty scored) Skiri

Ullevaal Stadion, Oslo
Attendance: 25,109
Referee: Kristoffer Helgerud (Lier)

Molde	Aalesund

Molde:
GK	1	(Norway) Knut Dørum Lillebakk
RB	2	(Norway) Kristoffer P. Vatshaug
CB	14	(Norway) Christian Steen
CB	24	(Norway) Vegard Forren
LB	5	(Norway) Øyvind Gjerde		(substituted off) 37'
RM	6	(Norway) Daniel Berg Hestad (c)	(yellow card) 40'
CM	8	(Senegal) Makhtar Thioune
LM	10	(Norway) Magne Hoseth	(yellow card) 17'	(substituted off) 90+1'
RW	42	(Senegal) Pape Paté Diouf
CF	32	(Senegal) Mame Biram Diouf
LW	9	(Sweden) Mattias Moström		(substituted off) 62'
Substitutions:
GK	22	(Norway) Jan Kjell Larsen
DF	3	(Sweden) Marcus Andreasson		(substituted on) 37'
MF	4	(Norway) Thomas Holm		(substituted on) 62'
MF	15	(Norway) Aksel Berget Skjølsvik
MF	18	(Brazil) Valter Tomaz Júnior
FW	19	(Brazil) José Mota		(substituted on) 90+1'
FW	20	(Norway) Rune Ertsås
Head Coach:
(Sweden) Kjell Jonevret

Aalesund:
GK	13	(Denmark) Anders Lindegaard
RB	5	(Finland) Ville Jalasto
CB	2	(Norway) Amund Skiri
CB	4	(Norway) Jonatan Tollås Nation
LB	14	(Norway) Jonathan Parr
RM	18	(Jamaica) Khari Stephenson
CM	10	(Sweden) Johan Arneng (c)	(yellow card) 45+1'
CM	7	(Norway) Trond Fredriksen		(substituted off) 102'
LM	22	(Norway) Fredrik Carlsen	(yellow card) 27' (yellow-red card) 51'
CF	9	(Norway) Glenn Roberts		(substituted off) 60'
CF	25	(Brazil) Diego Silva		(substituted off) 102'
Substitutions:
GK	1	(Norway) Sten Grytebust
FW	8	(Norway) Tor Hogne Aarøy		(substituted on) 102'
MF	11	(Costa Rica) Pablo Herrera		(substituted on) 60'
MF	17	(Jamaica) Demar Phillips		(substituted on) 102'
MF	19	(Norway) Peter Orry Larsen
FW	20	(Norway) Didrik Fløtre
MF	21	(Norway) Alexander Mathisen
Head Coach:
(Norway) Kjetil Rekdal

MATCH OFFICIALS

- Assistant referees:
  - Kim André Johnsen (Enebakk Fotball)
  - Harald Strand (Midtbygdens IL)
- Fourth official: Ken Henry Johnsen (IL Flint)

MATCH RULES

- 90 minutes.
- 30 minutes of extra-time if necessary.
- Penalty shoot-out if scores still level.
- Seven named substitutes.
- Maximum of three substitutions.
