= 2010 Molde FK season =

Molde
2010 season
- Chairman: Erik Berg
- Head coach: Kjell Jonevret (until 30 August); Uwe Rösler (from 30 August)
- Stadium: Aker Stadion
- Tippeligaen: 11th
- Norwegian Cup: Third Round vs. Sogndal
- UEFA Europa League: Third qualifying round vs. Stuttgart
- Top goalscorer: League: Baye Djiby Fall (16); All: Baye Djiby Fall (19)
- Highest home attendance: 11,140 vs. Aalesund (6 May 2010)
- Lowest home attendance: 7,302 vs. Strømsgodset (15 April 2010)
- Average home league attendance: 8,413
Home colours	Away colours	Third colours

The 2010 season was Molde's third consecutive year in Tippeligaen, and their 34th season in the top flight of Norwegian football. They competed in Tippeligaen where they finished in 11th position, the Norwegian Cup where they were knocked out in the third round and the UEFA Europa League where they were knocked by Stuttgart in the third qualifying round. Head coach Kjell Jonevret was sacked on 30 August, with the club positioned in 14th place and in danger of being relegated, and was replaced by Uwe Rösler which saved the club from relegation with six wins and two draws in the last eight matches.

== Transfers ==
=== In ===
Date	Position	Number	Nationality	Name	From	Fee
1 January 2010	DF	18	(Norway)	Magne Simonsen	(Norway) Lyn	Unknown
10 January 2010	DF	17	(Sweden)	Emil Johansson	(Sweden) Hammarby	Unknown
28 July 2010	FW	27	(Nigeria)	Daniel Chima Chukwu	(Norway) Lyn	Unknown
30 July 2010	GK	12	(Norway)	Espen Bugge Pettersen	(Norway) Sandefjord	Unknown
31 August 2010	DF	20	(Norway)	Krister Wemberg	(Norway) Moss	Unknown
	MF	32	(Norway)	Magnus Stamnestrø	(Norway) KIL/Hemne	Unknown
	MF	31	(Norway)	Simon Markeng	(Norway) Træff	Unknown

=== Out ===
Date	Position	Number	Nationality	Name	To	Fee
30 June 2010	GK	12	(England)	Ben Amos	(England) Manchester United	Loan return
9 November 2009	FW	32	(Senegal)	Mame Biram Diouf	(England) Manchester United	Loan return
	MF	13	(United States)	Brian Waltrip	(Japan) Kyoto	Free
	MF	18	(Brazil)	Valter Tomaz Junior	(Sweden) Örgryte	Free

=== Loan in ===
Date from	Date to	Position	Nationality	Name	From
25 January 2010	End of season	FW	(Senegal)	Baye Djiby Fall	(Russia) Lokomotiv Moscow
22 February 2010	End of season	FW	(Sweden)	Björn Runström	(Denmark) OB
6 March 2010	30 June 2010	GK	(England)	Ben Amos	(England) Manchester United

=== Loan out ===
Date from	Date to	Position	Nationality	Name	To
9 January 2010	End of season	FW	(Brazil)	José Mota	(South Korea) Suwon Samsung Bluewings
5 March 2010	2 August 2010	FW	(Norway)	Rune Ertsås	(Norway) Sandefjord
12 August 2010	End of season	GK	(Norway)	Elias Valderhaug	(Norway) Kristiansund
12 August 2010	End of season	DF	(Norway)	Jacob Falch Meidell	(Norway) Kristiansund
24 August 2010	21 July 2011	DF	(Norway)	Knut Olav Rindarøy	(Spain) Deportivo de La Coruña

== Competitions ==
=== Tippeligaen ===
==== Results summary ====
Overall								Home						Away					
Pld	W	D	L	GF	GA	GD	Pts	W	D	L	GF	GA	GD	W	D	L	GF	GA	GD
30	10	10	10	42	45	−3	40	7	4	4	23	19	+4	3	6	6	19	26	−7

Last updated: April 2012.
Source: nifs.no

==== Results by round ====
Round	1	2	3	4	5	6	7	8	9	10	11	12	13	14	15	16	17	18	19	20	21	22	23	24	25	26	27	28	29	30
Ground	H	A	A	H	A	H	A	H	A	H	A	H	A	H	A	A	H	H	A	H	A	H	A	H	A	H	A	H	A	H
Result	L	L	D	W	L	W	D	L	D	W	L	W	L	D	L	D	D	L	D	D	L	L	W	W	D	W	W	D	W	W
Position	11	14	14	13	13	10	12	12	12	11	12	11	12	12	13	13	13	13	13	13	13	14	13	13	13	13	12	12	12	11

Source: see below
A = Away; H = Home; W = Win; D = Draw; L = Loss

==== Fixtures & results ====
14 March 2010 1	Molde	1 – 2	Rosenborg	Molde
20:00 CET	Runström 37'	Report	Prica 42'; Lustig 51'	Stadium: Aker Stadion; Attendance: 9,080; Referee: Terje Hauge

21 March 2010 2	Sandefjord	3 – 1	Molde	Sandefjord
18:00 CET	Saric 52', 72'; Ertsås 70'	Report	Hoseth 12'	Stadium: Komplett.no Arena; Attendance: 3,837; Referee: Brage Sandmoen

27 March 2010 3	Start	1 – 1	Molde	Kristiansand
16:00 CEST	Bolaños 7'	Report	Holm 59'	Stadium: Sør Arena; Attendance: 7,853; Referee: Per Ivar Staberg

5 April 2010 4	Molde	3 – 2	Brann	Molde
20:00 CEST	Hestad 44'; Hoseth 57'; Moström 69'	Report	Vaagan Moen 3'; Huseklepp 24'	Stadium: Aker Stadion; Attendance: 8,007; Referee: Espen Berntsen

12 April 2010 5	Vålerenga	2 – 1	Molde	Oslo
19:00 CEST	Fellah 19'; Berre 68'	Report	Fall 34'	Stadium: Ullevaal Stadion; Attendance: 12,480; Referee: Tom Harald Hagen

15 April 2010 6	Molde	3 – 2	Strømsgodset	Molde
19:00 CEST	Moström 50', 84'; Hoseth 72' (pen.)	Report	Berget 64'; Pedersen 73'	Stadium: Aker Stadion; Attendance: 7,302; Referee: Dag Vidar Hafsås

18 April 2010 7	Odd Grenland	1 – 1	Molde	Skien
18:00 CEST	Kovács 12'	Report	Steen 90'	Stadium: Skagerak Arena; Attendance: 6,357; Referee: Tommy Skjerven

26 April 2010 8	Molde	2 – 3	Tromsø	Molde
18:00 CEST	Fall 39'; Hoseth 67'	Report	Mourad 40', 54'; Björck 83'	Stadium: Aker Stadion; Attendance: 7,656; Referee: Kjetil Sælen

2 May 2010 9	Hønefoss	1 – 1	Molde	Hønefoss
18:00 CEST	Obiefule 3'	Report	Hestad 81'	Stadium: Aka Arena; Attendance: 3,497; Referee: Roy Helge Olsen

6 May 2010 10	Molde	2 – 1	Aalesund	Molde
20:00 CEST	Hoseth 47'; Fall 53'	Report	Sylling Olsen 40'	Stadium: Aker Stadion; Attendance: 11,140; Referee: Tommy Skjerven

10 May 2010 11	Viking	4 – 1	Molde	Stavanger
19:00 CEST	Ingelsten 42'; Sigurdsson 62'; Bjarnason 76'; Skogseid 80'	Report	Skjølsvik 7'	Stadium: Viking Stadion; Attendance: 10,906; Referee: Tom Henning Øvrebø

16 May 2010 12	Molde	2 – 1	Haugesund	Molde
16:00 CEST	Fall 10'; Skjerve 58', 63' (o.g.)	Report	Djurdjic 60'	Stadium: Aker Stadion; Attendance: 9,608; Referee: Dag Vidar Hafsås

24 May 2010 13	Kongsvinger	3 – 1	Molde	Kongsvinger
18:00 CEST	Johannesen 15'; Torp 21'; Güven 49'	Report	Fall 54'	Stadium: Gjemselund Stadion; Attendance: 2,362; Referee: Tom Henning Øvrebø

6 June 2010 14	Molde	3 – 3	Lillestrøm	Molde
18:00 CEST	Fall 16', 70'; Skjølsvik 56'	Report	Kippe 90'; Elyounoussi 90+2'; Ujah 90+4'	Stadium: Aker Stadion; Attendance: 9,142; Referee: Svein Oddvar Moen

5 July 2010 15	Stabæk	4 – 3	Molde	Bærum
19:00 CEST	Páll Gunnarsson 13', 20', 61' (pen.); Hoff 63'	Report	Hestad 16'; Skjølsvik 84'; Fall 87'	Stadium: Telenor Arena; Attendance: 7,075; Referee: Tom Harald Hagen

10 July 2010 16	Aalesund	0 – 0	Molde	Ålesund
16:00 CEST		Report		Stadium: Color Line Stadion; Attendance: 10,778; Referee: Terje Hauge

18 July 2010 17	Molde	0 – 0	Sandefjord	Molde
18:00 CEST		Report		Stadium: Aker Stadion; Attendance: 9,293; Referee: Tom Henning Øvrebø

25 July 2010 18	Molde	1 – 2	Start	Molde
18:00 CEST	Hoseth 21'	Report	Stokkelien 16'; Børufsen 83'	Stadium: Aker Stadion; Attendance: 8,498; Referee: Tommy Skjerven

1 August 2010 19	Brann	1 – 1	Molde	Bergen
20:00 CEST	Huseklepp 61'	Report	Thioune 81'	Stadium: Brann Stadion; Attendance: 13,139; Referee: Svein Oddvar Moen

8 August 2010 20	Molde	2 – 2	Viking	Molde
18:00 CEST	Fall 56', 68'	Report	Nevland 46'; Danielsen 60'	Stadium: Aker Stadion; Attendance: 7,864; Referee: Trond Ivar Døvle

22 August 2010 21	Rosenborg	3 – 1	Molde	Trondheim
20:00 CEST	Strand 14'; Dorsin 32'; Iversen 61'	Report	Hoseth 11'	Stadium: Lerkendal Stadion; Attendance: 16,762; Referee: Svein Oddvar Moen

29 August 2010 22	Molde	0 – 1	Vålerenga	Molde
18:00 CEST		Report	Andreasson 4' (o.g.)	Stadium: Aker Stadion; Attendance: 8,034; Referee: Per Ivar Staberg

13 September 2010 23	Strømsgodset	1 – 3	Molde	Drammen
19:00 CEST	Keita 34'	Report	Holm 16'; Thioune 31'; Fall 61'	Stadium: Marienlyst Stadion; Attendance: 4,760; Referee: Terje Hauge

19 September 2010 24	Molde	1 – 0	Hønefoss	Molde
18:00 CEST	Fall 38'	Report		Stadium: Aker Stadion; Attendance: 8,120; Referee: Dag Vidar Hafsås

25 September 2010 25	Lillestrøm	1 – 1	Molde	Lillestrøm
17:00 CEST	Ujah 51'	Report	Fall 87'	Stadium: Åråsen Stadion; Attendance: 5,117; Referee: Per Ivar Staberg

3 October 2010 26	Molde	2 – 0	Kongsvinger	Molde
18:00 CEST	Fall 19'; Diouf 28'	Report		Stadium: Aker Stadion; Attendance: 7,642; Referee: Tommy Skjerven

18 October 2010 27	Tromsø	0 – 1	Molde	Tromsø
19:00		Report	Hoseth 44'	Stadium: Alfheim Stadion; Attendance: 4,202; Referee: Tom Harald Hagen

24 October 2010 28	Molde	0 – 0	Odd Grenland	Molde
18:00		Report		Stadium: Aker Stadion; Attendance: 7,361; Referee: Dag Vidar Hafsås

31 October 2010 29	Haugesund	1 – 2	Molde	Haugesund
18:00	Đurđić 68' (pen.)	Report	Hoseth 23'; Fall 55'	Stadium: Haugesund stadion Attendance: 4,914; Referee: Brage Sandmoen

7 November 2010 30	Molde	1 – 0	Stabæk	Molde
18:00	Fall 47' (pen.)	Report		Stadium: Aker Stadion; Attendance: 7,445; Referee: Per Ivar Staberg

==== League table ====
Pos	Team	Pld	W	D	L	GF	GA	GD	Pts
9	Viking	30	10	11	9	48	41	+7	41
10	Lillestrøm	30	9	13	8	51	44	+7	40
11	Molde	30	10	10	10	42	45	−3	40
12	Stabæk	30	11	6	13	46	47	−1	39
13	Brann	30	8	10	12	48	50	−2	34

Source: fotball.no
Rules for classification: 1) points; 2) goal difference; 3) number of goals scored.

=== Norwegian Cup ===
13 May 2010 First Round	Surnadal	1 – 3	Molde	Surnadal
18:00 CEST	Bolme 90'	Report	Runström 23', 52'; Simonsen 90+2'	Stadium: Syltøran Stadion; Referee: Even Myrheim

19 May 2010 Second Round	Strindheim	2 – 4	Molde	Trondheim
18:00 CEST	Toft 51'; Tønne 87'	Report	Fall 24'; Hoseth 48'; Steen 60'; Skjølsvik 62'	Stadium: Strindheim Kunstgress; Referee: Kjetil Thorsø Hansen

9 June 2010 Third Round	Molde	1 – 3	Sogndal	Molde
18:00 CEST	Steen 19'; Johansson (red card) 66'; Hoseth (yellow card) 36' (yellow-red card) 88'	Report; Summary	Kader 6', 8'; Flo 57'	Stadium: Aker Stadion; Attendance: 1,406; Referee: Kjetil Sælen

=== UEFA Europa League ===
==== Second qualifying round ====
15 July 2010 First Leg	Molde (Norway)	1 – 0	(Latvia) Jelgava	Molde, Norway
19:00	Fall 90+1'	Report		Stadium: Aker Stadion; Attendance: 2,343; Referee: Antti Munukka (Finland)

22 July 2010 Second Leg	Jelgava (Latvia)	2 – 1 (2 – 2 (a) agg.)	(Norway) Molde	Jūrmala, Latvia
18:00	Bormakovs 30'; Bogdaškins 45+1'	Report	Fall 14'	Stadium: Slokas Stadium^{40} Attendance: 2,000; Referee: Thomas Vejlgaard (Denmark)

==== Third qualifying round ====
29 July 2010 First Leg	Molde (Norway)	2 – 3	(Germany) Stuttgart	Molde, Norway
18:30	Moström 65'; Hoseth 76'	Report	Rudy 27'; Kuzmanović 74'; Harnik 82'	Stadium: Aker Stadion; Attendance: 3,270; Referee: Bas Nijhuis (Netherlands)

5 August 2010 Second Leg	Stuttgart (Germany)	2 – 2 (5 – 4 agg.)	(Norway) Molde	Stuttgart, Germany
20:30	Pogrebnyak 55'; Gebhart 90+3'	Report	Johansson 41'; Rindarøy 49'	Stadium: Mercedes-Benz Arena; Attendance: 11,500; Referee: Mauro Bergonzi (Italy)

== Squad statistics ==
=== Appearances and goals ===
No.	Pos	Nat	Player	Total		Tippeligaen		Norwegian Cup		Europa League	
No.	Pos	Nat	Player	Apps	Goals	Apps	Goals	Apps	Goals	Apps	Goals
1	GK	(Norway) NOR	Knut Dørum Lillebakk	7	0	3	0	0	0	4	0
2	DF	(Norway) NOR	Kristoffer Paulsen Vatshaug	26	0	24	0	2	0	0	0
3	DF	(Sweden) SWE	Marcus Andreasson	29	0	24	0	1	0	4	0
4	MF	(Norway) NOR	Thomas Holm	33	2	27	2	2	0	4	0
5	DF	(Norway) NOR	Øyvind Gjerde	8	0	6	0	0	0	2	0
6	DF	(Norway) NOR	Daniel Berg Hestad (c)	32	3	26	3	2	0	4	0
8	MF	(Senegal) SEN	Makhtar Thioune	23	2	18	2	1	0	4	0
9	FW	(Sweden) SWE	Mattias Moström	34	4	28	3	2	0	4	1
10	MF	(Norway) NOR	Magne Hoseth	32	11	25	9	3	1	4	1
11	FW	(Senegal) SEN	Pape Paté Diouf	14	1	13	1	0	0	1	0
12	GK	(Norway) NOR	Espen Bugge Pettersen	12	0	12	0	0	0	0	0
14	DF	(Norway) NOR	Christian Steen	17	3	14	1	3	2	0	0
15	MF	(Norway) NOR	Aksel Berget Skjølsvik	33	4	26	3	3	1	4	0
17	DF	(Sweden) SWE	Emil Johansson	31	1	24	0	3	0	4	1
18	DF	(Norway) NOR	Magne Simonsen	31	1	24	0	3	1	4	0
19	FW	(Senegal) SEN	Baye Djiby Fall	34	19	28	16	2	1	4	2
20	DF	(Norway) NOR	Krister Wemberg	0	0	0	0	0	0	0	0
21	MF	(Norway) NOR	Kristian Strandhagen	3	0	2	0	1	0	0	0
22	GK	(Norway) NOR	Jan Kjell Larsen	9	0	7	0	2	0	0	0
24	DF	(Norway) NOR	Vegard Forren	35	0	28	0	3	0	4	0
27	FW	(Nigeria) NGR	Daniel Chima	4	0	4	0	0	0	0	0
28	DF	(Norway) NOR	Torjus Aaland	0	0	0	0	0	0	0	0
29	FW	(Sweden) SWE	Björn Runström	21	3	17	1	3	2	1	0
30	DF	(Norway) NOR	Ivar Furu	0	0	0	0	0	0	0	0
31	FW	(Norway) NOR	Simon Markeng	3	0	2	0	1	0	0	0
32	MF	(Norway) NOR	Magnus Stamnestrø	3	0	3	0	0	0	0	0
Players who appeared for Molde but left the club before the end of the season:
12	GK	(England) ENG	Ben Amos	9	0	8	0	1	0	0	0
23	DF	(Norway) NOR	Knut Olav Rindarøy	21	1	15	0	2	0	4	1

=== Goal Scorers ===
Rank	Pos.	No.	Player	Tippeligaen	Norwegian Cup	Europa League	Total
1	FW	19	(Senegal) Baye Djiby Fall	16	1	2	19
2	MF	10	(Norway) Magne Hoseth	9	1	1	11
3	MF	9	(Sweden) Mattias Moström	3	0	1	4
3	MF	15	(Norway) Aksel Berget Skjølsvik	3	1	0	4
5	MF	6	(Norway) Daniel Berg Hestad	3	0	0	3
5	DF	14	(Norway) Christian Steen	1	2	0	3
5	FW	29	(Sweden) Björn Runström	1	2	0	3
8	MF	4	(Norway) Thomas Holm	2	0	0	2
8	MF	8	(Senegal) Makhtar Thioune	2	0	0	2
10	FW	42	(Senegal) Pape Paté Diouf	1	0	0	1
10	DF	17	(Sweden) Emil Johansson	0	0	1	1
10	DF	18	(Norway) Magne Simonsen	0	1	0	1
10	DF	23	(Norway) Knut Olav Rindarøy	0	0	1	1
Own Goal				1	0	0	1
			TOTALS	42	8	6	56

== See also ==
- Molde FK seasons
