= 2009 Molde FK season =

Molde
2009 season
- Chairman: Erik Berg
- Head coach: Kjell Jonevret
- Stadium: Aker Stadion
- Tippeligaen: 2nd
- Norwegian Cup: Runners-up
- Top goalscorer: League: Mame Biram Diouf (16); All: Mame Biram Diouf (23)
- Highest home attendance: 11,168 vs. Brann (12 July 2009)
- Lowest home attendance: 1,702 vs. Kongsvinger (18 June 2009)
- Average home league attendance: 7,965
Home colours	Away colours

The 2009 season was Molde's 2nd consecutive year in Tippeligaen, and their 33rd season in the top flight of Norwegian football. They competed in Tippeligaen where they finished in 2nd position and the Norwegian Cup where they were defeated by Aalesund in the Norwegian Cup Final.

== Squad ==
Note: Flags indicate national team as defined under FIFA eligibility rules; some limited exceptions apply. Players may hold more than one non-FIFA nationality.

No.	Pos.	Nation	Player
1	GK	NOR	Knut Dørum Lillebakk
2	DF	NOR	Kristoffer Paulsen Vatshaug
3	DF	SWE	Marcus Andreasson
4	MF	NOR	Thomas Holm
5	DF	NOR	Øyvind Gjerde
6	MF	NOR	Daniel Berg Hestad (Captain)
8	MF	SEN	Makhtar Thioune
9	MF	SWE	Mattias Moström
10	MF	NOR	Magne Hoseth
13	MF	USA	Brian Waltrip
14	DF	NOR	Christian Steen
15	MF	NOR	Aksel Berget Skjølsvik
16	MF	NOR	Jacob Falch Meidell

No.	Pos.	Nation	Player
18	DF	BRA	Valter Tomaz Junior
19	FW	BRA	José Mota
20	FW	NOR	Rune Ertsås
21	MF	NOR	Kristian Strandhagen
22	GK	NOR	Jan Kjell Larsen
23	DF	NOR	Knut Olav Rindarøy
24	DF	NOR	Vegard Forren
25	FW	SEN	Mame Mbar Diouf
30	GK	NOR	Elias Valderhaug
31	DF	NOR	Vidar G. Henriksen
32	FW	SEN	Mame Biram Diouf (on loan from Manchester United)
42	FW	SEN	Pape Paté Diouf

== Transfers ==
=== Winter ===
In: Note: Flags indicate national team as defined under FIFA eligibility rules; some limited exceptions apply. Players may hold more than one non-FIFA nationality.

No.	Pos.	Nation	Player
8	MF	SEN	Makhtar Thioune (from (Norway) Sarpsborg 08)

Out: Note: Flags indicate national team as defined under FIFA eligibility rules; some limited exceptions apply. Players may hold more than one non-FIFA nationality.

No.	Pos.	Nation	Player
7	MF	NOR	Thomas Mork (to (Norway) Sportsklubben Rival)
8	MF	FIN	Toni Koskela (to (Finland) JJK)
21	MF	TUN	Souhaieb El Amari
29	MF	BDI	Selemani Ndikumana (to (Belgium) Lierse)

=== Summer ===
In: Note: Flags indicate national team as defined under FIFA eligibility rules; some limited exceptions apply. Players may hold more than one non-FIFA nationality.

No.	Pos.	Nation	Player
25	FW	SEN	Mame Mbar Diouf (from (Senegal) ASC Diaraf)
27	FW	SEN	Mame Biram Diouf (loan from (England) Manchester United)

Out: Note: Flags indicate national team as defined under FIFA eligibility rules; some limited exceptions apply. Players may hold more than one non-FIFA nationality.

No.	Pos.	Nation	Player
27	FW	SEN	Mame Biram Diouf (to (England) Manchester United)

== Competitions ==
=== Tippeligaen ===
==== Results summary ====
Overall								Home						Away					
Pld	W	D	L	GF	GA	GD	Pts	W	D	L	GF	GA	GD	W	D	L	GF	GA	GD
30	17	5	8	62	35	+27	56	10	2	3	39	16	+23	7	3	5	23	19	+4

Last updated: 8 June 2012.
Source: soccerway.com

==== Results by round ====
Round	1	2	3	4	5	6	7	8	9	10	11	12	13	14	15	16	17	18	19	20	21	22	23	24	25	26	27	28	29	30
Ground	A	H	A	H	A	H	A	H	A	H	A	H	A	H	A	H	A	H	A	H	A	H	A	H	A	H	A	H	A	H
Result	W	W	W	D	W	L	W	L	D	D	L	W	D	W	W	W	W	W	D	W	L	W	L	W	L	L	L	W	W	W
Position	4	2	1	2	1	2	2	2	2	2	4	2	2	2	2	2	2	2	2	2	2	2	2	2	2	2	2	2	2	2

Source: see below
A = Away; H = Home; W = Win; D = Draw; L = Loss

==== Fixtures ====
15 March 2009 1	Lyn	0 – 1	Molde	Oslo
16:00 CET (UTC+1)			Ertsås 47'	Stadium: Ullevaal Stadion; Attendance: 3,495; Referee: Per Ivar Staberg

22 March 2009 2	Molde	3 – 1	Bodø/Glimt	Molde
16:00 CET (UTC+1)	Thioune 27'; P. Diouf 60'; M. Diouf 76'		Rønning 86'	Stadium: Aker Stadion; Attendance: 5,741; Referee: Kjetil Saelen

5 April 2009 3	Strømsgodset	0 – 2	Molde	Drammen
16:00 CEST (UTC+2)			P. Diouf 22'; M. Diouf 49'	Stadium: Marienlyst Stadion; Attendance: 4,474; Referee: Espen Berntsen

13 April 2009 4	Molde	1 – 1	Sandefjord	Molde
16:00 CEST (UTC+2)	M. Diouf 18'		Šarić 7'	Stadium: Aker Stadion; Attendance: 7,806; Referee: Terje Hauge

19 April 2009 5	Stabæk	2 – 3	Molde	Bærum
16:00 CEST (UTC+2)	Kobayashi 10'; Farnerud 44'		Olsen 28' (o.g.); Thioune 50'; Mota 65'	Stadium: Nadderud Stadion; Attendance: 8,897; Referee: Dag Vidar Hafsås

25 April 2009 6	Molde	1 – 2	Viking	Molde
14:00 CEST (UTC+2)	M. Diouf 90'		Ødegaard 38'; Nisja 65'	Stadium: Aker Stadion; Attendance: 8,019; Referee: Per Ivar Staberg

2 May 2009 7	Aalesund	0 – 2	Molde	Ålesund
14:00 CEST (UTC+2)			M. Diouf 60'; Hoseth 63'	Stadium: Color Line Stadion; Attendance: 10,778; Referee: Espen Berntsen

6 May 2009 8	Molde	0 – 3	Vålerenga	Molde
16:00 CEST (UTC+2)			Leigh 26' dos Santos 49'; Zajić 79'	Stadium: Aker Stadion; Attendance: 7,235; Referee: Kristoffer Helgerud

16 May 2009 9	Rosenborg	2 – 2	Molde	Trondheim
17:00 CEST (UTC+2)	Olsen 54'; Iversen 90'		Forren 15'; Tettey 75' (o.g.)	Stadium: Lerkendal Stadion; Attendance: 21,597; Referee: Espen Berntsen

21 May 2009 10	Molde	1 – 1	Tromsø	Molde
14:00 CEST (UTC+2)	Mota 45'		Knarvik 90'	Stadium: Aker Stadion; Attendance: 8,014; Referee: Kjetil Saelen

28 May 2009 11	Brann	2 – 0	Molde	Bergen
17:45 CEST (UTC+2)	Jaiteh 30'; Karadas 90'			Stadium: Brann Stadion; Attendance: 15,094; Referee: Tommy Skjerven

1 June 2009 12	Molde	2 – 1	Odd Grenland	Molde
16:00 CEST (UTC+2)	M. Diouf 21'; Skjølsvik 36'		Steen 30' (o.g.)	Stadium: Aker Stadion; Attendance: 6,762; Referee: Dag Vidar Hafsås

15 June 2009 13	Start	2 – 2	Molde	Kristiansand
17:00 CEST (UTC+2)	Fevang 18'; Hulsker 78'; Hulsker (red card) 90'		P. Diouf 19', 65'	Stadium: Sør Arena; Attendance: 7,594; Referee: Tommy Skjerven

21 June 2009 14	Molde	2 – 0	Fredrikstad	Molde
16:00 CEST (UTC+2)	Mota 14'; Hoseth 74' (pen.)		Martinsen (red card) 73'; Gashi (yellow card) 79' (yellow-red card) 80'	Stadium: Aker Stadion; Attendance: 7,429; Referee: Kristoffer Helgerud

25 June 2009 15	Lillestrøm	0 – 1	Molde	Lillestrøm
17:00 CEST (UTC+2)			Ertsås 90'	Stadium: Åråsen Stadion; Attendance: 7,329; Referee: Svein Oddvar Moen

28 June 2009 16	Molde	4 – 0	Lyn	Molde
16:00 CEST (UTC+2)	P. Diouf 15'; M. Diouf 65'; Thioune 76' (pen.); Mota 80'			Stadium: Aker Stadion; Attendance: 7,577; Referee: Svein-Erik Edvartsen

5 July 2009 17	Bodø/Glimt	2 – 4	Molde	Bodø
16:00 CEST (UTC+2)	Thiago Martins 11'; Konradsen 41'		P. Diouf 19'; M. Diouf 34'; Hoseth 61'; Ertsås 89'	Stadium: Aspmyra Stadion; Attendance: 4,130; Referee: Brage Sandmoen

12 July 2009 18	Molde	5 – 2	Brann	Molde
18:00 CEST (UTC+2)	M. Diouf 1', 7', 10', 27'; P. Diouf 90'		Huseklepp 46'; Björnsson 90'	Stadium: Aker Stadion; Attendance: 11,168; Referee: Tom Henning Övrebö

26 July 2009 19	Sandefjord	1 – 1	Molde	Sandefjord
16:00 CEST (UTC+2)	Salčinović 73'		Mota 74'	Stadium: Komplett.no Arena; Attendance: 6,111; Referee: Svein-Erik Edvartsen

1 August 2009 20	Molde	8 – 1	Start	Molde
14:00 CEST (UTC+2)	Forren 7'; Mota 21', 90'; Hoseth 32', 36', 40' (pen.); M. Diouf 59'; Ertsås 79'		Lillebakk 66' (o.g.)	Stadium: Aker Stadion; Attendance: 7,418; Referee: Per Ivar Staberg

17 August 2009 21	Viking	2 – 1	Molde	Stavanger
16:00 CEST (UTC+2)	Bjarnason 50'; Fillo 78'		Skjølsvik 17'	Stadium: Viking Stadion; Attendance: 13,349; Referee: Ken Henry Johnsen

22 August 2009 22	Molde	3 – 1	Aalesund	Molde
17:00 CEST (UTC+2)	P. Diouf 2', 25'; Moström 81'		Phillips (yellow card) 22' (yellow-red card) 73'; Stephenson 80' (pen.)	Stadium: Aker Stadion; Attendance: 11,154; Referee: Roy Helge Olsen

29 August 2009 23	Vålerenga	2 – 1	Molde	Oslo
14:00 CEST (UTC+2)	Shelton 39'; Storbæk 71'		M. Diouf 18'	Stadium: Ullevaal Stadion; Attendance: 6,891; Referee: Tommy Skjerven

13 September 2009 24	Molde	2 – 1	Strømsgodset	Molde
16:00 CEST (UTC+2)	Steen 34', 60'		Kamara 90'	Stadium: Aker Stadion; Attendance: 6,621; Referee: Brage Sandmoen

20 September 2009 25	Tromsø	1 – 0	Molde	Tromsø
16:00 CEST (UTC+2)	Reginiussen 25'			Stadium: Alfheim Stadion; Attendance: 4,790; Referee: Svein-Erik Edvartsen

27 September 2009 26	Molde	0 – 2	Rosenborg	Molde
18:00 CEST (UTC+2)			Iversen 79'; Olsen 86'	Stadium: Aker Stadion; Attendance: 10,773; Referee: Kjetil Saelen

3 October 2009 27	Odd Grenland	2 – 1	Molde	Skien
16:15 CEST (UTC+2)	Gulsvik 15' (pen.); Kovács 21'		Rindarøy 88'	Stadium: Skagerak Arena; Attendance: 5,055; Referee: Per Ivar Staberg

17 October 2009 28	Molde	4 – 0	Stabæk	Molde
14:00 CEST (UTC+2)	M. Diouf 36'; Moström 59'; P. Diouf 69', 87'		Andersson (yellow card) 4' (yellow-red card) 15'	Stadium: Aker Stadion; Attendance: 6,830; Referee: Terje Hauge

25 October 2009 29	Fredrikstad	1 – 2	Molde	Hamar
16:00 CEST (UTC+2)	Gashi 87'		Thioune 81'; Mota 85'	Stadium: Briskeby gressbane Attendance: 10,337; Referee: Brage Sandmoen

1 November 2009 30	Molde	3 – 0	Lillestrøm	Molde
16:00 CET (UTC+1)	M. Diouf 39'; Hoseth 53'; Forren 69'			Stadium: Aker Stadion; Attendance: 7,383; Referee: Svein Oddvar Moen

==== League table ====
Pos	Team	Pld	W	D	L	GF	GA	GD	Pts	Qualification or relegation
1	Rosenborg (C)	30	20	9	1	60	22	+38	69	Qualification for the Champions League second qualifying round
2	Molde	30	17	5	8	62	35	+27	56	Qualification for the Europa League second qualifying round
3	Stabæk	30	15	8	7	52	34	+18	53	Qualification for the Europa League second qualifying round
4	Odd Grenland	30	12	10	8	53	44	+9	46	
5	Brann	30	12	8	10	51	49	+2	44	

Source: fotball.no
Rules for classification: 1) points; 2) goal difference; 3) number of goals scored.
(C) Champions

=== Norwegian Cup ===
10 May 2009 First Round	Tornado Måløy	1 – 8	Molde	Måløy
18:00 CEST (UTC+2)	Sigthorsson 5'	Summary	M. Diouf 1', 36', 58'; Steen 48'; Skjølsvik 80'; Ertsås 86'; Moström 88'; Forren 90'	Stadium: Måløy Stadion; Referee: Petter Kristiansen Toppe

24 May 2009 Second Round	Hødd	0 – 2	Molde	Ulsteinvik
18:00 CEST (UTC+2)		Summary	M. Diouf 63', 73'	Stadium: Høddvoll Stadion; Referee: Sigurd Smehus Kringstad

18 June 2009 Third Round	Molde	1 – 0	Kongsvinger	Molde
18:00 CEST (UTC+2)	Ertsås 80'	Summary		Stadium: Aker Stadion; Attendance: 1,702; Referee: Brage Sandmoen

8 July 2009 Fourth Round	Alta	0 – 1	Molde	Alta
19:00 CEST (UTC+2)		Summary	Skjølsvik 71'	Stadium: Finnmarkshallen; Attendance: 1,330; Referee: Espen Berntsen

9 August 2009 Quarterfinal	Molde	5 – 0	Rosenborg	Molde
19:00 CEST (UTC+2)	P. Diouf 10', 74'; Berg Hestad 52'; Hoseth 57'; Mota 83'	Summary		Stadium: Aker Stadion; Attendance: 11,272; Referee: Terje Hauge

23 September 2009 Semifinal	Molde	6 – 3 (a.e.t.)	Vålerenga	Molde
18:00 CEST (UTC+2)	Hoseth 78' (pen.); P. Diouf 84', 95'; Thioune 105', 119'; Moström 120'	Summary	Singh 45'; Abdellaoue 81', 117'	Stadium: Aker Stadion; Attendance: 7,986; Referee: Svein Oddvar Moen

==== Final ====
8 November 2009	Molde	2 – 2 (a.e.t.) (4 – 5 p)	Aalesund	Oslo
13:15 CET (UTC+1)	M.Diouf 27', 96'	Summary	Roberts 54'; Aarøy 114'	Stadium: Ullevaal Stadion; Attendance: 25,500; Referee: Kristoffer Helgerud (Lier)
	Penalties
	Mota (penalty missed); Thioune (penalty scored); Forren (penalty scored); Steen (penalty scored); P.Diouf (penalty scored)		(penalty scored) Stephenson; (penalty scored) Arneng; (penalty scored) Herrera; (penalty scored) Phillips; (penalty scored) Skiri

== Squad statistics ==
=== Appearances and goals ===
No.	Pos	Nat	Player	Total		Tippeligaen		Norwegian Cup	
No.	Pos	Nat	Player	Apps	Goals	Apps	Goals	Apps	Goals
1	GK	(Norway) NOR	Knut Dørum Lillebakk	24	0	19+0	0	5+0	0
2	DF	(Norway) NOR	Kristoffer Paulsen Vatshaug	31	0	25+1	0	5+0	0
3	DF	(Sweden) SWE	Marcus Andreasson	26	0	12+9	0	3+2	0
4	MF	(Norway) NOR	Thomas Holm	17	0	12+3	0	0+2	0
5	DF	(Norway) NOR	Øyvind Gjerde	10	0	1+6	0	3+0	0
6	MF	(Norway) NOR	Daniel Berg Hestad	34	1	27+0	0	7+0	1
8	MF	(Senegal) SEN	Makhtar Thioune	31	6	25+1	4	5+0	2
9	MF	(Sweden) SWE	Mattias Moström	32	4	21+5	2	2+4	2
10	MF	(Norway) NOR	Magne Hoseth	33	9	19+7	7	7+0	2
14	DF	(Norway) NOR	Christian Steen	36	3	28+1	2	6+1	1
15	MF	(Norway) NOR	Aksel Berget Skjølsvik	20	4	8+9	2	2+1	2
16	MF	(Norway) NOR	Jacob Falch Meidell	1	0	0+1	0	0+0	0
18	DF	(Brazil) BRA	Valter Tomaz Junior	2	0	0+2	0	0+0	0
19	FW	(Brazil) BRA	José Mota	33	9	11+15	8	6+1	1
20	FW	(Norway) NOR	Rune Ertsås	25	6	2+18	4	1+4	2
21	MF	(Norway) NOR	Kristian Strandhagen	2	0	0+1	0	0+1	0
22	GK	(Norway) NOR	Jan Kjell Larsen	13	0	11+0	0	2+0	0
23	DF	(Norway) NOR	Knut Olav Rindarøy	33	1	29+0	1	4+0	0
24	DF	(Norway) NOR	Vegard Forren	34	4	25+2	3	7+0	1
30	GK	(Norway) NOR	Elias Valderhaug	1	0	0+0	0	0+1	0
32	FW	(Senegal) SEN	Mame Biram Diouf	36	23	27+2	16	6+1	7
42	FW	(Senegal) SEN	Pape Paté Diouf	35	15	28+0	11	6+1	4
Players away from Molde on loan:
Players that left Molde during the season:

=== Goal Scorers ===
Place	Position	Nation	Number	Name	Tippeligaen	Norwegian Cup	Total
1	FW	(Senegal)	32	Mame Biram Diouf	16	7	23
2	FW	(Senegal)	42	Pape Paté Diouf	11	4	15
3	FW	(Brazil)	19	José Mota	8	1	9
3	MF	(Norway)	10	Magne Hoseth	7	2	9
5	FW	(Norway)	20	Rune Ertsås	4	2	6
5	MF	(Senegal)	8	Makhtar Thioune	4	2	6
7	DF	(Norway)	24	Vegard Forren	3	1	4
7	MF	(Norway)	15	Aksel Berget Skjølsvik	2	2	4
7	MF	(Sweden)	9	Mattias Moström	2	2	4
10	DF	(Norway)	14	Christian Steen	2	1	3
11				Own goal	2	0	2
12	DF	(Norway)	23	Knut Olav Rindarøy	1	0	1
12	MF	(Norway)	6	Daniel Berg Hestad	0	1	1
				TOTALS	62	25	87

=== Disciplinary record ===
Number	Nation	Position	Name	Tippeligaen		Norwegian Cup		Total	
Number	Nation	Position	Name	Yellow card	Red card	Yellow card	Red card	Yellow card	Red card
2	(Norway)	DF	Kristoffer Paulsen Vatshaug	5	0	0	0	5	0
3	(Sweden)	DF	Marcus Andreasson	1	0	0	0	1	0
5	(Norway)	DF	Øyvind Gjerde	1	0	0	0	1	0
6	(Norway)	MF	Daniel Berg Hestad	2	0	2	0	4	0
8	(Senegal)	MF	Makhtar Thioune	5	0	2	0	7	0
9	(Sweden)	MF	Mattias Moström	0	0	1	0	1	0
10	(Norway)	MF	Magne Hoseth	8	0	2	0	10	0
14	(Norway)	DF	Christian Steen	2	0	0	0	2	0
15	(Norway)	MF	Aksel Berget Skjølsvik	2	0	0	0	2	0
18	(Brazil)	DF	Valter Tomaz Junior	1	0	0	0	1	0
19	(Brazil)	FW	José Mota	3	0	0	0	3	0
20	(Norway)	FW	Rune Ertsås	1	0	0	0	1	0
23	(Norway)	DF	Knut Olav Rindarøy	1	0	0	0	1	0
24	(Norway)	DF	Vegard Forren	2	0	1	0	3	0
32	(Senegal)	FW	Mame Biram Diouf	2	0	0	0	2	0
42	(Senegal)	FW	Pape Paté Diouf	6	0	0	0	6	0
			TOTALS	42	0	9	0	51	0

== See also ==
- Molde FK seasons
