= 2008 Molde FK season =

Molde
2008 season
- Chairman: Erik Berg
- Head coach: Kjell Jonevret
- Stadium: Aker Stadion
- Tippeligaen: 9th
- Norwegian Cup: Semi-final vs Stabæk
- Top goalscorer: League: José Mota (12); All: José Mota (15)
- Highest home attendance: 11,400 vs. Rosenborg (24 May 2008)
- Lowest home attendance: 2,649 vs. Kristiansund (2 July 2008)
- Average home league attendance: 8,203
Home colours	Away colours

The 2008 season was Molde's 32nd season in the top flight of Norwegian football. They competed in Tippeligaen where they finished in 9th position and the Norwegian Cup where they were knocked out by Stabæk in the semi-finals.

== Squad ==
Note: Flags indicate national team as defined under FIFA eligibility rules; some limited exceptions apply. Players may hold more than one non-FIFA nationality.

No.	Pos.	Nation	Player
1	GK	NOR	Knut Dørum Lillebakk
2	DF	NOR	Kristoffer P. Vatshaug
3	DF	SWE	Marcus Andreasson
4	MF	NOR	Thomas Holm
5	DF	NOR	Øyvind Gjerde
6	MF	NOR	Daniel Berg Hestad (Captain)
7	MF	NOR	Thomas Mork
8	MF	FIN	Toni Koskela
9	MF	SWE	Mattias Moström
10	MF	NOR	Magne Hoseth
13	MF	USA	Brian Waltrip
14	DF	NOR	Christian Steen
15	FW	NOR	Aksel Berget Skjølsvik

No.	Pos.	Nation	Player
16	DF	NOR	Fredrik Samdal Solberg
18	DF	BRA	Valter
19	FW	BRA	José Mota
20	FW	NOR	Rune Ertsås
21	MF	TUN	Souhaieb El Amari
22	GK	NOR	Jan Kjell Larsen
23	DF	NOR	Knut Olav Rindarøy
24	DF	NOR	Vegard Forren
27	FW	SEN	Mame Biram Diouf
28	MF	NOR	Kristoffer Hildrestrand
29	FW	BDI	Selemani Ndikumana
30	GK	NOR	Elias Valderhaug
42	FW	SEN	Pape Paté Diouf

== Transfers ==
=== Winter ===
In: Note: Flags indicate national team as defined under FIFA eligibility rules; some limited exceptions apply. Players may hold more than one non-FIFA nationality.

No.	Pos.	Nation	Player
2	DF	NOR	Kristoffer Paulsen Vatshaug (from Start)
4	MF	NOR	Thomas Holm (from Vålerenga)
12	FW	BRA	José Mota (loan from AaB)
13	FW	USA	Brian Waltrip (from Sogndal)
14	DF	NOR	Christian Steen (from Tromsø)
29	FW	BDI	Selemani Ndikumana (from Simba)

Out: Note: Flags indicate national team as defined under FIFA eligibility rules; some limited exceptions apply. Players may hold more than one non-FIFA nationality.

No.	Pos.	Nation	Player
11	DF	NOR	Tommy Eide Møster (to Bryne)
14	MF	NOR	Christian Gauseth
21	MF	CAN	Sandro Grande (to Montreal Impact)
23	FW	ISL	Marel Baldvinsson (to Breiðablik)
26	FW	SEN	Madiou Konate (to Hønefoss)

=== Summer ===
In: Note: Flags indicate national team as defined under FIFA eligibility rules; some limited exceptions apply. Players may hold more than one non-FIFA nationality.

No.	Pos.	Nation	Player
19	FW	BRA	José Mota (from AaB, previously on loan)
21	MF	TUN	Souhaieb El Amari

Out: Note: Flags indicate national team as defined under FIFA eligibility rules; some limited exceptions apply. Players may hold more than one non-FIFA nationality.

No.	Pos.	Nation	Player

== Competitions ==
=== Tippeligaen ===
==== Results summary ====
Overall								Home						Away					
Pld	W	D	L	GF	GA	GD	Pts	W	D	L	GF	GA	GD	W	D	L	GF	GA	GD
26	7	10	9	39	43	−4	31	3	5	5	16	14	+2	4	5	4	23	29	−6

Last updated: 1 June 2012.
Source: soccerway.com

==== Results by round ====
Round	1	2	3	4	5	6	7	8	9	10	11	12	13	14	15	16	17	18	19	20	21	22	23	24	25	26
Ground	H	A	H	A	H	A	H	H	A	H	A	H	A	H	A	H	A	H	A	H	A	A	H	A	H	A
Result	D	L	D	D	D	W	L	L	W	L	D	W	D	W	L	D	L	L	D	D	W	L	W	D	L	W
Position	8	13	13	12	11	10	11	11	11	11	11	11	11	9	11	10	11	11	11	11	10	12	10	10	10	9

Source: see below
A = Away; H = Home; W = Win; D = Draw; L = Loss

==== Fixtures ====
30 March 2008 1	Molde	0–0	Stabæk	Molde
16:00 CET (UTC+1)				Stadium: Aker Stadion; Attendance: 7,367; Referee: Svein-Erik Edvartsen

6 April 2008 2	Fredrikstad	2–1	Molde	Fredrikstad
16:00 CEST (UTC+2)	Elyounoussi 69', 83'; Barsom (red card) 77'		Hoseth 76'	Stadium: Fredrikstad Stadion; Attendance: 10,347; Referee: Tom Harald Hagen

13 April 2008 3	Molde	0–0	Tromsø	Molde
16:00 CEST (UTC+2)				Stadium: Aker Stadion; Attendance: 7,375; Referee: Kjetil Saelen

20 April 2008 4	Lillestrøm	1–1	Molde	Lillestrøm
16:00 CEST (UTC+2)	Occean 25'		Mota 52'	Stadium: Åråsen Stadion; Attendance: 8,526; Referee: Kjell Alseth

27 April 2008 5	Molde	0–0	Strømsgodset	Molde
16:00 CEST (UTC+2)				Stadium: Aker Stadion; Attendance: 7,179; Referee: Tommy Skjerven

4 May 2008 6	Vålerenga	1–2	Molde	Oslo
16:00 CEST (UTC+2)	Holm 57'		Hestad 14', 22'	Stadium: Ullevaal Stadion; Attendance: 14,941; Referee: Johnny Ditlefsen

16 May 2008 7	Molde	2–3	Viking	Molde
16:00 CEST (UTC+2)	Mota 74', 85'		Fillo 76', 88'; Velička 82'	Stadium: Aker Stadion; Attendance: 8,542; Referee: Tom Harald Hagen

24 May 2008 8	Molde	1–2	Rosenborg	Molde
17:00 CEST (UTC+2)	Gjerde 23'; Forren (red card) 45'		Iversen 53'; Strand 82'	Stadium: Aker Stadion; Attendance: 11,400; Referee: Tommy Skjerven

31 May 2008 9	Brann	3–4	Molde	Brann Stadion
17:00 CEST (UTC+2)	Sigurðsson 21'; Moen 48'; Helstad 50'		M.Diouf 5', 56'; Hoseth 72'; P.Diouf 86'	Stadium: Bergen; Attendance: 17,710; Referee: Kjell Alseth

8 June 2008 10	Molde	0–1	Lyn	Molde
14:00 CEST (UTC+2)			Bjarnason 47'; Obiefule 72'	Stadium: Aker Stadion; Attendance: 7,041; Referee: Kjetil Saelen

28 June 2008 11	Aalesunds	1–1	Molde	Ålesund
18:00 CEST (UTC+2)	Parr 40'		M.Diouf 56'	Stadium: Color Line Stadion; Attendance: 10,778; Referee: Tommy Skjerven

6 July 2008 12	Molde	2–0	HamKam	Molde
16:00 CEST (UTC+2)	M.Diouf 25'; Mota 74'			Stadium: Aker Stadion; Attendance: 7,146; Referee: Ken Henry Johnsen

13 July 2008 13	Bodø/Glimt	2–2	Molde	Bodø
16:00 CEST (UTC+2)	Johansen 51', 54'		Hoseth 26'; Hoseth (red card) 58'; Mota 73'	Stadium: Aspmyra Stadion; Attendance: 4,488; Referee: Tom Harald Hagen

19 July 2008 14	Molde	5–1	Vålerenga	Molde
17:00 CEST (UTC+2)	Mota 45', 76'; Hestad 48', 64'; P.Diouf 61'		Abdellaoue 13'	Stadium: Aker Stadion; Attendance: 11,051; Referee: Per Ivar Staberg

27 July 2008 15	Strømsgodset	4–0	Molde	Drammen
16:00 CEST (UTC+2)	Winsnes 48', 78'; Sørum 54'; Ohr 85'			Stadium: Marienlyst Stadion; Attendance: 5,571; Referee: Terje Hauge

4 August 2008 16	Molde	0–0	Aalesund	Molde
17:00 CEST (UTC+2)				Stadium: Aker Stadion; Attendance: 11,011; Referee: Espen Berntsen

10 August 2008 17	Rosenborg	3–1	Molde	Lerkendal Stadion
18:00 CEST (UTC+2)	Iversen 10'; Berisha 51', 55'		Ertsås 83'	Stadium: Trondheim; Attendance: 16,393; Referee: Brage Sandmoen

24 August 2008 18	Molde	1–2	Bodø/Glimt	Molde
16:00 CEST (UTC+2)	Gjerde 74'		Bjarnason 7'; Sørensen 48'	Stadium: Aker Stadion; Attendance: 7,420; Referee: Terje Hauge

31 August 2008 19	Viking	3–3	Molde	Stavanger
16:00 CEST (UTC+2)	Niang 31'; Stokholm 49'; Gaarde 61'; Ross (red card) 75'		Niang 30' (o.g.); Moström 44'; M.Diouf 90'; P.Diouf (red card) 90'	Stadium: Viking Stadion; Attendance: 15,122; Referee: Tom Henning Övrebö

14 September 2008 20	Molde	1–1	Lillestrøm	Molde
16:00 CEST (UTC+2)	Skjølsvik 65'		Occean 31'	Stadium: Aker Stadion; Attendance: 7,151; Referee: Johnny Ditlefsen

21 September 2008 21	Lyn	1–3	Molde	Oslo
16:00 CEST (UTC+2)	Pratto 77'		Skjølsvik 14'; Koskela 29' (pen.); M.Diouf 68'	Stadium: Ullevaal Stadion; Attendance: 3,602; Referee: Roy Helge Olsen

29 September 2008 22	Stabæk	4–0	Molde	Bærum
17:00 CEST (UTC+2)	Andersson 34'; Nannskog 38', 79'; Gunnarsson 68'			Stadium: Nadderud Stadion; Attendance: 5,326; Referee: Tom Harald Hagen

6 October 2008 23	Molde	3–2	Brann	Molde
17:00 CEST (UTC+2)	M.Diouf (red card) 39'; Mota 51', 72'; Steen 85'		Moen 24'; Austin 27'	Stadium: Aker Stadion; Attendance: 6,969; Referee: Svein Oddvar Moen

18 October 2008 24	Tromsø	4–4	Molde	Tromsø
17:00 CEST (UTC+2)	Rushfeldt 39', 60'; Hestad 54' (o.g.); Moldskred 66'		P.Diouf 25', 57', 73'; Mota 87'	Stadium: Alfheim Stadion; Attendance: 4,322; Referee: Terje Hauge

26 October 2008 25	Molde	1–2	Fredrikstad	Molde
16:00 CEST (UTC+2)	Mota 6'		Tegström 82', 89'	Stadium: Aker Stadion; Attendance: 6,993; Referee: Kjell Alseth

2 November 2008 26	HamKam	0–1	Molde	Hamar
16:00 CET (UTC+1)			Mota 27'	Stadium: Briskeby gressbane Attendance: 5,195; Referee: Per Ivar Staberg

==== League table ====
Pos	Team	Pld	W	D	L	GF	GA	GD	Pts	Qualification or relegation
7	Lyn	26	11	5	10	38	34	+4	38	
8	Brann	26	8	9	9	36	36	0	33	
9	Molde	26	7	10	9	39	43	−4	31	
10	Vålerenga	26	8	6	12	31	37	−6	30	Qualification for the Europa League third qualifying round (Note: Vålerenga qualified for the Europa League third qualifying round as 2008 Norwegian Cup winners.)
11	Strømsgodset	26	8	5	13	33	44	−11	29	

Source: fotball.no
Rules for classification: 1) points; 2) goal difference; 3) number of goals scored.

=== Norwegian Cup ===
10 May 2008 First Round	Elnesvågen og Omegn	0–6	Molde	Elnesvågen
18:00 CEST (UTC+2)		Summary	Mota 15'; Skjølsvik 20'; Steen 45+1'; Waltrip 73'; M.Diouf 77'; Vatshaug 90+1'	Stadium: Elnesvågen Stadion; Referee: Sigurd Smehus Kringstad

4 June 2008 Second Round	Steinkjer	1–1 (a.e.t.) (2–4 p)	Molde	Steinkjer
18:00 CEST (UTC+2)	Bye 83'	Summary	Mota 4'; P.Diouf (yellow card) 12' (yellow-red card) 63'	Stadium: Guldbergaunet stadion Referee: Stig Rune Krokdal
	Penalties
	Eek (penalty missed); Bye (penalty missed); Rezmanyi (penalty scored); Bøkestad (penalty scored)		(penalty missed) Lillebakk; (penalty scored) Mota; (penalty scored) Forren; (penalty scored) Koskela; (penalty scored) Steen

2 July 2008 Third Round	Molde	2–1 (a.e.t.)	Kristiansund	Molde
18:00 CEST (UTC+2)	Gjerde 4'; Hoseth 120'	Summary	Bright 14'	Stadium: Aker Stadion; Referee: Brage Sandmoen

23 August 2008 Fourth Round	Molde	8–0	Brann	Molde
19:00 CEST (UTC+2)	Mota 5'; M.Diouf 15', 52', 55'; Hoseth 33', 53', 86'; Hestad 62'	Summary		Stadium: Aker Stadion; Attendance: 4,452; Referee: Espen Berntsen

15 August 2008 Quarterfinal	Lyn	1–3 (a.e.t.)	Molde	Oslo
19:00 CEST (UTC+2)	Angan 98'	Summary	P.Diouf 100'; Forren 103'; Hoseth 119'	Stadium: Ullevaal Stadion; Attendance: 2,750; Referee: Svein Erik Edvartsen

24 September 2008 Semifinal	Stabæk	3–0	Molde	Bærum
19:00 CEST (UTC+2)	Nannskog 30' 90+2'; Farnerud 76'	Summary		Stadium: Nadderud Stadion; Attendance: 4,880; Referee: Per Ivar Staberg

== Squad statistics ==
=== Appearances and goals ===
No.	Pos	Nat	Player	Total		Tippeligaen		Norwegian Cup	
No.	Pos	Nat	Player	Apps	Goals	Apps	Goals	Apps	Goals
1	GK	(Norway) NOR	Knut Dørum Lillebakk	3	0	0+0	0	2+1	0
2	DF	(Norway) NOR	Kristoffer Paulsen Vatshaug	32	1	26+0	0	6+0	1
3	DF	(Sweden) SWE	Marcus Andreasson	9	0	6+2	0	1+0	0
4	MF	(Norway) NOR	Thomas Holm	20	0	15+3	0	2+0	0
5	DF	(Norway) NOR	Øyvind Gjerde	27	3	20+2	2	5+0	1
6	MF	(Norway) NOR	Daniel Berg Hestad	30	4	25+0	4	5+0	0
7	MF	(Norway) NOR	Thomas Mork	5	0	1+2	0	0+2	0
8	MF	(Finland) FIN	Toni Koskela	28	1	19+4	1	4+1	0
9	MF	(Sweden) SWE	Mattias Moström	20	1	15+3	1	1+1	0
10	MF	(Norway) NOR	Magne Hoseth	26	8	20+1	3	4+1	5
13	MF	(United States) USA	Brian Waltrip	14	1	4+7	0	1+2	1
14	DF	(Norway) NOR	Christian Steen	13	2	3+7	1	2+1	1
15	MF	(Norway) NOR	Aksel Berget Skjølsvik	16	3	4+8	2	2+2	1
18	DF	(Brazil) BRA	Valter	5	0	1+1	0	3+0	0
19	FW	(Brazil) BRA	José Mota	31	15	20+5	12	5+1	3
20	FW	(Norway) NOR	Rune Ertsås	19	1	3+13	1	1+2	0
22	GK	(Norway) NOR	Jan Kjell Larsen	30	0	26+0	0	4+0	0
23	DF	(Norway) NOR	Knut Olav Rindarøy	27	0	22+1	0	4+0	0
24	DF	(Norway) NOR	Vegard Forren	30	0	25+0	0	5+0	0
26	MF	(Norway) NOR	Ronny Fredriksen	1	0	0+0	0	0+1	0
27	FW	(Senegal) SEN	Mame Biram Diouf	29	11	19+4	7	6+0	4
29	FW	(Burundi) BDI	Selemani Ndikumana	2	0	0+1	0	0+1	0
42	FW	(Senegal) SEN	Pape Paté Diouf	24	5	11+10	4	2+1	1
	MF	(Norway) NOR	Kristoffer Hildrestrand	1	0	0+0	0	0+1	0
Players away from Molde on loan:
25	MF	(Norway) NOR	Peter Berg Hestad	1	1	0+0	0	1+0	1
Players who appeared for Molde no longer at the club:

=== Goal Scorers ===
Place	Position	Nation	Number	Name	Tippeligaen	Norwegian Cup	Total
1	FW	(Brazil)	19	José Mota	12	3	15
2	FW	(Senegal)	27	Mame Biram Diouf	6	4	10
3	MF	(Norway)	10	Magne Hoseth	3	5	8
4	FW	(Senegal)	42	Pape Paté Diouf	5	1	6
5	MF	(Norway)	6	Daniel Berg Hestad	4	0	4
6	DF	(Norway)	5	Øyvind Gjerde	2	1	3
6	MF	(Norway)	15	Aksel Berget Skjølsvik	2	1	3
8	DF	(Norway)	14	Christian Steen	1	1	2
9		(Norway)	25	Peter Berg Hestad	0	1	1
9	DF	(Norway)	24	Vegard Forren	0	1	1
9	MF	(Finland)	8	Toni Koskela	1	0	1
9	MF	(Sweden)	9	Mattias Moström	1	0	1
9	FW	(Norway)	20	Rune Ertsås	1	0	1
9	MF	(United States)	14	Brian Waltrip	0	1	1
9	DF	(Norway)	2	Kristoffer Paulsen Vatshaug	0	1	1
9				Own goal	1	0	1
				TOTALS	39	20	59

=== Disciplinary record ===
Number	Nation	Position	Name	Adeccoligaen		Norwegian Cup		Total	
Number	Nation	Position	Name	Yellow card	Red card	Yellow card	Red card	Yellow card	Red card
2	(Norway)	DF	Kristoffer Paulsen Vatshaug	2	0	0	0	2	0
3	(Sweden)	DF	Marcus Andreasson	1	0	0	0	1	0
4	(Norway)	MF	Thomas Holm	4	0	1	0	5	0
5	(Norway)	DF	Øyvind Gjerde	1	0	0	0	1	0
6	(Norway)	MF	Daniel Berg Hestad	3	0	0	0	3	0
8	(Finland)	MF	Toni Koskela	3	0	1	0	4	0
10	(Norway)	MF	Magne Hoseth	6	1	0	0	6	1
15	(Norway)	MF	Aksel Berget Skjølsvik	2	0	0	0	2	0
18	(Brazil)	DF	Valter	1	0	0	0	1	0
19	(Brazil)	FW	José Mota	2	0	0	0	2	0
20	(Norway)	FW	Rune Ertsås	1	0	0	0	1	0
23	(Norway)	DF	Knut Olav Rindarøy	2	0	1	0	3	0
24	(Norway)	DF	Vegard Forren	2	1	0	0	2	1
27	(Senegal)	FW	Mame Biram Diouf	1	1	1	0	2	1
42	(Senegal)	FW	Pape Paté Diouf	4	1	2	1	6	2
			TOTALS	35	4	6	1	41	6

== See also ==
- Molde FK seasons
