= 2007 Molde FK season =

Molde
2007 season
- Chairman: Erik Berg
- Head coach: Kjell Jonevret
- Stadium: Aker Stadion
- Adeccoligaen: 1st (promoted)
- Norwegian Cup: First Round vs KIL/Hemne
- Top goalscorer: League: Mame Biram Diouf (10); All: Mame Biram Diouf (10)
- Highest home attendance: 7,530 vs Løv-Ham (21 July 2007)
- Lowest home attendance: 5,226 vs Mandalskameratene (26 August 2007)
- Average home league attendance: 6,344
Home colours	Away colours

The 2007 season was Molde's 1st season back in the Adeccoligaen after relegation from the Tippeligaen in 2006. They finished in 1st position in the league and in the Norwegian Cup they were knocked out in the first round by KIL/Hemne.

== Squad ==
Note: Flags indicate national team as defined under FIFA eligibility rules; some limited exceptions apply. Players may hold more than one non-FIFA nationality.

No.	Pos.	Nation	Player
1	GK	NOR	Knut Dørum Lillebakk
2	DF	NOR	Knut Olav Rindarøy
3	DF	SWE	Marcus Andreasson
5	DF	NOR	Øyvind Gjerde
6	MF	NOR	Daniel Berg Hestad (Captain)
7	MF	NOR	Thomas Mork
9	MF	SWE	Mattias Moström
10	MF	NOR	Magne Hoseth
11	MF	NOR	Tommy Eide Møster
14	MF	NOR	Christian Gauseth
15	FW	NOR	Aksel Berget Skjølsvik
16	DF	NOR	Fredrik Samdal Solberg
17	DF	NOR	Trond Strande
18	DF	BRA	Valter Tomaz Junior

No.	Pos.	Nation	Player
19	MF	FIN	Toni Koskela
20	FW	NOR	Rune Ertsås
21	MF	CAN	Sandro Grande
22	GK	NOR	Jan Kjell Larsen
23	FW	ISL	Marel Baldvinsson
24	DF	NOR	Vegard Forren
26	FW	SEN	Madiou Konate
27	FW	SEN	Mame Biram Diouf
30	GK	NOR	Elias Valderhaug
31	DF	NOR	Vidar Giske Henriksen
32	MF	NOR	Kristian Strandhagen
33	DF	NOR	Petter Christian Singsaas
36	DF	NOR	Eirik Rundberg
42	FW	SEN	Pape Paté Diouf

== Transfers ==
=== Winter ===
In: Note: Flags indicate national team as defined under FIFA eligibility rules; some limited exceptions apply. Players may hold more than one non-FIFA nationality.

No.	Pos.	Nation	Player
9	MF	SWE	Mattias Moström (from (Sweden) AIK)
14	MF	NOR	Christian Gauseth
15	FW	NOR	Aksel Berget Skjølsvik (from (Norway) Rosenborg)
16	DF	NOR	Fredrik Samdal Solberg
18	DF	BRA	Valter Tomaz Junior (from (Sweden) Örgryte)
19	MF	FIN	Toni Koskela (from (Finland) KooTeePee)
27	FW	SEN	Mame Biram Diouf (from (Senegal) ASC Diaraf)

Out: Note: Flags indicate national team as defined under FIFA eligibility rules; some limited exceptions apply. Players may hold more than one non-FIFA nationality.

No.	Pos.	Nation	Player
4	DF	FIN	Toni Kallio (to (Switzerland) BSC Young Boys)
10	DF	NOR	Stian Ohr (to (Norway) Strømsgodset)
13	DF	GHA	Habib Mohamed (loan return to (Ghana) King Faisal Babes)
15	FW	NOR	Petter Rudi (to (Belgium) Gent)
24	DF	SLO	Matej Mavrič (loan to (Germany) TuS Koblenz)

=== Summer ===
In: Note: Flags indicate national team as defined under FIFA eligibility rules; some limited exceptions apply. Players may hold more than one non-FIFA nationality.

No.	Pos.	Nation	Player
24	DF	NOR	Vegard Forren (from (Norway) KIL/Hemne)
30	GK	NOR	Elias Valderhaug (from (Norway) Valder)

Out: Note: Flags indicate national team as defined under FIFA eligibility rules; some limited exceptions apply. Players may hold more than one non-FIFA nationality.

No.	Pos.	Nation	Player
8	DF	NOR	Marcus Bakke
12	GK	NOR	Lars Ivar Moldskred (to (Norway) Lillestrøm)
24	DF	SLO	Matej Mavrič (to (Germany) TuS Koblenz, previously on loan)
25	MF	NOR	Peter Berg Hestad (on loan to (Norway) Byåsen)

== Competitions ==
=== Adeccoligaen ===
==== Results summary ====
Overall								Home						Away					
Pld	W	D	L	GF	GA	GD	Pts	W	D	L	GF	GA	GD	W	D	L	GF	GA	GD
30	22	3	5	62	28	+34	69	10	2	3	35	15	+20	12	1	2	27	13	+14

Last updated: 1 June 2012.
Source: soccerway.com

==== Results by round ====
Round	1	2	3	4	5	6	7	8	9	10	11	12	13	14	15	16	17	18	19	20	21	22	23	24	25	26	27	28	29	30
Ground	A	H	A	H	A	H	A	H	A	H	A	H	H	A	H	H	A	H	A	H	A	H	A	H	A	H	A	A	H	A
Result	W	W	W	D	W	L	W	L	W	W	W	W	W	W	W	W	D	W	W	W	W	D	W	W	W	W	L	L	L	W
Position	3	2	1	2	2	3	3	4	3	3	2	1	1	1	1	1	2	1	1	1	1	1	1	1	1	1	1	1	1	1

Source: see below
A = Away; H = Home; W = Win; D = Draw; L = Loss

==== Results ====
8 April 2007 1	Sogndal	2 – 3	Molde	Sogndalsfjøra
18:00 CEST (UTC+2)	Hovland 4'; Waltrip 65'		Hoseth 62' (pen.); Ertsås 73'; Koskela 78'	Stadium: Fosshaugane Campus; Attendance: 2,347; Referee: Rune Nordby

13 April 2007 2	Molde	3 – 0	Moss	Molde
16:00 CEST (UTC+2)	M.Diouf 19'; Mork 59'; Hoseth 63'			Stadium: Aker Stadion; Attendance: 6,240; Referee: Kjell Alseth

22 April 2007 3	Sarpsborg 08	1 – 2	Molde	Sarpsborg
18:00 CEST (UTC+2)	Wiig 26'		Gjerde 60'; Ertsås 65'	Stadium: Sarpsborg Stadion; Attendance: 631; Referee: Ole Kamben

29 April 2007 4	Molde	1 – 1	Hønefoss	Molde
18:00 CEST (UTC+2)	Baldvinsson 56'		Saaliti 12'	Stadium: Aker Stadion; Attendance: 6,557; Referee: Roy Helge Olsen

5 May 2007 5	Mandalskameratene	0 – 3	Molde	Mandal
18:00 CEST (UTC+2)			M.Diouf 43'; Tomaz Jr. 65'; Ertsås 76'	Stadium: Idrettsparken; Attendance: 732; Referee: Ken Henry Johnsen

12 May 2007 6	Molde	0 – 2	HamKam	Molde
15:00 CEST (UTC+2)			Andreasson 48' (o.g.); Pasoja 90' (pen.)	Stadium: Aker Stadion; Attendance: 6,859; Referee: Dag Vidar Hafsås

16 May 2007 7	Skeid	0 – 1	Molde	Oslo
17:00 CEST (UTC+2)			Berg Hestad 77'	Stadium: Bislett stadion Attendance: 1,156; Referee: Ole Kamben

28 May 2007 8	Molde	0 – 2	Kongsvinger	Molde
16:00 CEST (UTC+2)			Samuelsson 39'; Olsen 70'	Stadium: Aker Stadion; Attendance: 6,110; Referee: Stig-Rune Krokdal

7 June 2007 9	Bodø/Glimt	1 – 2	Molde	Bodø
16:00 CEST (UTC+2)	Olsen 70'		M.Diouf 2'; P.Diouf 8'	Stadium: Aspmyra Stadion; Attendance: 4,536; Referee: Svein-Erik Edvartsen

10 June 2007 10	Molde	1 – 0	Tromsdalen	Molde
16:00 CEST (UTC+2)	P.Diouf 68'		Talberg (red card) 83'	Stadium: Aker Stadion; Attendance: 5,974; Referee: Kjetil Saelen

17 June 2007 11	Haugesund	2 – 4	Molde	Haugesund
16:00 CEST (UTC+2)	J. Johansen 37'; Andreassen 63'		Moström 36'; M.Diouf 50'; Gauseth 74'; Gjerde 87'	Stadium: Haugesund stadion Attendance: 2,346; Referee: Ken Henry Johnsen

20 June 2007 12	Molde	1 – 0	Notodden	Molde
17:00 CEST (UTC+2)	P.Diouf 39'			Stadium: Aker Stadion; Attendance: 6,043; Referee: Morten Högberg

24 June 2007 13	Molde	3 – 2	Bryne	Molde
16:00 CEST (UTC+2)	M.Diouf 7'; Berg Hestad 29'; Gauseth 40'		J. Hagen 50'; Oyuga 87'	Stadium: Aker Stadion; Attendance: 6,430; Referee: Roy Helge Olsen

1 July 2007 14	Raufoss	1 – 2	Molde	Raufoss
16:00 CEST (UTC+2)	Haug 13' (pen.)		Ertsås 34'; Berg Hestad 47'	Stadium: Raufoss Stadion; Attendance: 1,254; Referee: Dag Vidar Hafsås

21 July 2007 15	Molde	4 – 1	Løv-Ham	Molde
14:00 CEST (UTC+2)	Berg Hestad 16', 66', 78'; P.Diouf 26'		Šarić 8'	Stadium: Aker Stadion; Attendance: 7,530; Referee: Stig-Rune Krokdal

29 July 2007 16	Molde	2 – 1	Sogndal	Molde
16:00 CEST (UTC+2)	M.Diouf 14'; Singsaas 31'		Flo 41'	Stadium: Aker Stadion; Attendance: 6,692; Referee: Ken Henry Johnsen

5 August 2007 17	Moss	0 – 0	Molde	Moss
16:00 CEST (UTC+2)			Strande (red card) 5'	Stadium: Melløs stadion Attendance: 2,102; Referee: Roy Helge Olsen

12 August 2007 18	Molde	1 – 0	Sarpsborg	Molde
16:00 CEST (UTC+2)	M.Diouf 12'			Stadium: Aker Stadion; Attendance: 6,300; Referee: Kim Borgersen

19 August 2007 19	Hønefoss	0 – 3	Molde	Hønefoss
16:00 CEST (UTC+2)			Baldvinsson 2'; Mork 28', 75'	Stadium: AKA Arena; Attendance: 988; Referee: Terje Hauge

26 August 2007 20	Molde	12 – 1	Mandalskameratene	Molde
16:00 CEST (UTC+2)	M.Diouf 9', 41'; Baldvinsson 11', 14'; Berg Hestad 33'; Hoseth 37', 57' (pen.); Tomaz Jr. 46'; Rindarøy 51'; Pepa 67', 70' (o.g.); Ertsås 85'	Summary	Ertzeid 23'	Stadium: Aker Stadion; Attendance: 5,226; Referee: Stig-Rune Krokdal

1 September 2007 21	HamKam	0 – 2	Molde	Hamar
16:00 CEST (UTC+2)			P.Diouf 33'; Baldvinsson 40'	Stadium: Briskeby gressbane Attendance: 4,124; Referee: Kim Borgersen

9 September 2007 22	Molde	0 – 0	Skeid	Molde
16:00 CEST (UTC+2)				Stadium: Aker Stadion; Attendance: 6,304; Referee: Petter Toppe

16 September 2007 23	Kongsvinger	1 – 2	Molde	Kongsvinger
14:00 CEST (UTC+2)	Olsen		Mork 18'; Baldvinsson 52'	Stadium: Gjemselund Stadion; Attendance: 981; Referee: Havard Hakestad

22 September 2007 24	Molde	4 – 2	Bodø/Glimt	Molde
14:00 CEST (UTC+2)	Hoseth 10', 64'; P.Diouf 50'; Mork 68'		Hamoud 12', 12'	Stadium: Aker Stadion; Attendance: 6,587; Referee: Øyvind Alapnes

30 September 2007 25	Tromsdalen	1 – 2	Molde	Tromsø
14:00 CEST (UTC+2)	Ahamed 58'		Koskela 36'; M.Diouf 40'	Stadium: Tromsdalen Stadion; Attendance: 510; Referee: Mads Ahlsen

8 October 2007 26	Molde	3 – 1	Haugesund	Molde
16:00 CEST (UTC+2)	Koskela 19'; Berg Hestad 26'; Ertsås 55'		J. Johansen 52' (pen.)	Stadium: Aker Stadion; Attendance: 6,302; Referee: Anders Johansen

14 October 2007 27	Notodden	2 – 0	Molde	Notodden
13:00 CEST (UTC+2)	Kvalheim 9'; Granerud 47'		Berg Hestad (yellow card) 32' (yellow-red card) 32'	Stadium: Notodden stadion Attendance: 1,429; Referee: Svein-Erik Edvartsen

21 October 2007 28	Bryne	2 – 0	Molde	Bryne
13:00 CEST (UTC+2)	C. Hansen 57'; M. Helle 72'			Stadium: Bryne Stadion; Attendance: 2,100; Referee: Petter Toppe

28 October 2007 29	Molde	0 – 2	Raufoss	Molde
11:00 CEST (UTC+2)			Haug 77' (pen.); Frejd 83'	Stadium: Aker Stadion; Attendance: 6,007; Referee: Øyvind Alapnes

4 November 2007 30	Løv-Ham	0 – 1	Molde	Bergen
11:00 CET (UTC+1)			Ertsås 67'	Stadium: Varden Amfi; Attendance: 563; Referee: Kristoffer Helgerud

==== League table ====
Pos	Team	Pld	W	D	L	GF	GA	GD	Pts	Promotion or relegation
1	Molde (C, P)	30	22	3	5	62	28	+34	69	Promotion to Tippeligaen
2	Ham-Kam (P)	30	21	5	4	82	36	+46	68	Promotion to Tippeligaen
3	Bodø/Glimt (O, P)	30	17	4	9	66	39	+27	55	Qualification for promotion play-offs (Note: The third-placed team in the 1. divisjon and the 12th-placed team in the Tippeligaen met in a playoff at the end of the season.)
4	Kongsvinger	30	16	5	9	56	42	+14	53	
5	Moss	30	15	8	7	46	37	+9	53	
6	Bryne	30	14	7	9	57	38	+19	49	
7	Sogndal	30	13	5	12	48	44	+4	44	
8	Haugesund	30	10	9	11	49	52	−3	39	
9	Notodden	30	11	3	16	49	54	−5	36	
10	Hønefoss BK	30	8	11	11	34	52	−18	35	
11	Raufoss (Note: Raufoss were relegated after failing to obtain a license due to financial irregularities. Sarpsborg Sparta, who were relegated initially, were given Raufoss spot in the following season.) (R)	30	10	5	15	37	61	−24	35	Relegation to 2. divisjon
12	Løv-Ham	30	9	6	15	39	44	−5	33	
13	Sarpsborg Sparta	30	8	8	14	50	52	−2	32	
14	Tromsdalen (R)	30	7	8	15	37	56	−19	29	Relegation to 2. divisjon
15	Skeid (R)	30	4	8	18	32	60	−28	20	Relegation to 2. divisjon
16	Mandalskameratene (R)	30	4	7	19	43	92	−49	19	Relegation to 2. divisjon

Source: speaker.no (in Norwegian)
Rules for classification: 1) points; 2) goal difference; 3) number of goals scored.
(C) Champions; (O) Play-off winners; (P) Promoted; (R) Relegated

=== Norwegian Cup ===
20 May 2007 1st Round	KIL/Hemne	3 – 1	Molde	Kyrksæterøra
18:00 CEST (UTC+2)	Snekvik 20'; Blakstad 75'; Sødahl 80'	Report	Tomaz Jr. 40'	Stadium: Ånesøyan gras Referee: Espen Tømmervold

== Squad statistics ==
=== Appearances and goals ===
No.	Pos	Nat	Player	Total		Adeccoligaen		Norwegian Cup	
No.	Pos	Nat	Player	Apps	Goals	Apps	Goals	Apps	Goals
2	DF	(Norway) NOR	Knut Olav Rindarøy	26	1	26+0	1	0+0	0
3	DF	(Sweden) SWE	Marcus Andreasson	25	0	24+0	0	1+0	0
5	DF	(Norway) NOR	Øyvind Gjerde	23	2	17+5	2	1+0	0
6	MF	(Norway) NOR	Daniel Berg Hestad	24	8	23+1	8	0+0	0
7	MF	(Norway) NOR	Thomas Mork	19	5	15+3	5	1+0	0
9	MF	(Sweden) SWE	Mattias Moström	18	1	16+1	1	1+0	0
10	MF	(Norway) NOR	Magne Hoseth	25	6	24+0	6	1+0	0
11	MF	(Norway) NOR	Tommy Eide Møster	3	0	0+2	0	0+1	0
14	MF	(Norway) NOR	Christian Gauseth	25	2	16+8	2	1+0	0
15	MF	(Norway) NOR	Aksel Berget Skjølsvik	18	0	1+16	0	0+1	0
16	DF	(Norway) NOR	Fredrik Samdal Solberg	2	0	1+1	0	0+0	0
17	DF	(Norway) NOR	Trond Strande	18	0	17+1	0	0+0	0
18	DF	(Brazil) BRA	Valter Tomaz Junior	25	3	19+5	2	1+0	1
19	MF	(Finland) FIN	Toni Koskela	28	3	21+6	3	1+0	0
20	FW	(Norway) NOR	Rune Ertsås	25	7	11+13	7	1+0	0
22	GK	(Norway) NOR	Jan Kjell Larsen	25	0	25+0	0	0+0	0
23	FW	(Iceland) ISL	Marel Baldvinsson	17	6	12+5	6	0+0	0
24	DF	(Norway) NOR	Vegard Forren	7	0	3+4	0	0+0	0
26	FW	(Senegal) SEN	Madiou Konate	3	0	0+3	0	0+0	0
27	FW	(Senegal) SEN	Mame Biram Diouf	23	10	19+3	10	1+0	0
31	DF	(Norway) NOR	Vidar Giske Henriksen	6	0	3+3	0	0+0	0
33	DF	(Norway) NOR	Petter Christian Singsaas	16	1	15+1	1	0+0	0
42	FW	(Senegal) SEN	Pape Paté Diouf	24	6	18+5	6	0+1	0
Players away from Molde on loan:
25	MF	(Norway) NOR	Peter Berg Hestad	2	0	0+2	0	0+0	0
Players who appeared for Molde no longer at the club:
12	GK	(Norway) NOR	Lars Ivar Moldskred	6	0	5+0	0	1+0	0

=== Goalscorers ===
Place	Position	Nation	Number	Name	Adeccoligaen	Norwegian Cup	Total
1	FW	(Senegal)	27	Mame Biram Diouf	10	0	10
2	DF	(Norway)	6	Daniel Berg Hestad	8	0	8
3	FW	(Norway)	20	Rune Ertsås	7	0	7
4	FW	(Senegal)	42	Pape Paté Diouf	6	0	6
4	MF	(Norway)	10	Magne Hoseth	6	0	6
4	FW	(Iceland)	23	Marel Baldvinsson	6	0	6
7	MF	(Norway)	7	Thomas Mork	5	0	5
8	MF	(Finland)	19	Toni Koskela	3	0	3
8	DF	(Brazil)	18	Valter Tomaz Junior	2	1	3
10	DF	(Norway)	5	Øyvind Gjerde	2	0	2
10	MF	(Norway)	14	Christian Gauseth	2	0	2
12	MF	(Sweden)	9	Mattias Moström	1	0	1
12	DF	(Norway)	2	Knut Olav Rindarøy	1	0	1
12	DF	(Norway)	33	Petter Christian Singsaas	1	0	1
				Own goals	2	0	2
				TOTALS	62	1	63

=== Disciplinary record ===
Number	Nation	Position	Name	Adeccoligaen		Norwegian Cup		Total	
Number	Nation	Position	Name	Yellow card	Red card	Yellow card	Red card	Yellow card	Red card
2	(Norway)	DF	Knut Olav Rindarøy	3	0	0	0	3	0
3	(Sweden)	DF	Marcus Andreasson	1	0	0	0	1	0
6	(Norway)	MF	Daniel Berg Hestad	5	1	0	0	5	1
7	(Norway)	MF	Thomas Mork	2	0	0	0	2	0
9	(Sweden)	MF	Mattias Moström	3	0	0	0	3	0
10	(Norway)	MF	Magne Hoseth	6	0	1	0	7	0
14	(Norway)	MF	Christian Gauseth	1	0	0	0	1	0
15	(Norway)	FW	Aksel Berget Skjølsvik	1	0	0	0	1	0
17	(Norway)	DF	Trond Strande	3	1	0	0	3	0
18	(Brazil)	DF	Valter Tomaz Junior	3	0	1	0	4	0
19	(Finland)	MF	Toni Koskela	4	0	0	0	4	0
22	(Norway)	GK	Jan Kjell Larsen	2	0	0	0	2	0
24	(Norway)	DF	Vegard Forren	1	0	0	0	1	0
27	(Senegal)	FW	Mame Biram Diouf	6	0	1	0	7	0
33	(Norway)	DF	Petter Christian Singsaas	2	0	0	0	2	0
42	(Senegal)	FW	Pape Paté Diouf	3	0	0	0	3	0
			TOTALS	46	2	3	0	49	2

== See also ==
- Molde FK seasons
