= List of Molde FK players (25–99 appearances) =

Molde Fotballklubb, also known simply as Molde FK, is a Norwegian professional football club based in Molde. The club is affiliated with Nordmøre og Romsdal Fotballkrets and play their home games at Aker Stadion. Formed on 19 June 1911, the club have won three national league title and four national cup titles. Molde participated in the UEFA Champions League in 1999 where they met Real Madrid, Porto and Olympiacos in the group stage. This made them the second Norwegian football club, to have reached the group stage of the competition. Currently playing in Eliteserien, where the season lasts from March to November. They won their first championship in 2011, and defended the title in 2012. In 2014 they won both their third and so far last league title and the national cup. Molde also had a successful period from 1994 to 2005, when they won two Norwegian Cup titles, and finished second in the league on four occasions. Since playing their first competitive match, a number of players have made a competitive first-team appearance for the club, of whom a number of players have made between 25 and 99 appearances (including substitute appearances).

== List of players ==
- Appearances and goals are for first-team competitive matches only, including Eliteserien, 1. divisjon, Norwegian Cup, Eliteserien play-offs, Champions League, UEFA Cup/Europa League and Cup Winners' Cup.
- Players are listed according to the date of their first-team debut for the club.

This list is under construction. Statistics correct as of match played 14 December 2023

Table headers

- Nationality – If a player played international football, the country/countries he played for are shown. Otherwise, the player's nationality is given as their country of birth.
- Molde career – The year of the player's first appearance for Molde FK to the year of his last appearance.
- Total – The total number of matches played, both as a starter and as a substitute.

Positions key
GK	Goalkeeper
DF	Defender
MF	Midfielder
FW	Forward
U	Utility player^{1}

Key
§	A minimum number due to lack of information

List of Molde FK players with between 25 and 99 appearances
Name	Nationality	Position	Molde career	Debut	Apps.	Goals	Ref
Ronald Wenaas	Norway	MF	1990; 1995–1997	29 April 1990	58	3	
Arthur Albiston	Scotland	DF	1992–1993	16 May 1992	26	3	
Berdon Sønderland	Norway	DF	1992–1995	12 May 1993	44	5	
Geir Televik	Norway	FW	1997–1998	20 April 1997	29	2	
Pål Lydersen	Norway	DF	1997–1999	11 May 1997	76	1	
Knut Dørum Lillebakk	Norway	GK	2001–2011	19 August 2001	67	0	
Øyvind Hoås	Norway	FW	2003–2004	26 April 2003	26	7	
Tommy Eide Møster	Norway	MF	2003–2007	26 April 2003	60	7	
Madiou Konate	Senegal	FW	2005–2007	3 July 2005	39	15	
Marel Baldvinsson	Iceland	FW	2005–2007	10 September 2006	25	6	
Rune Ertsås	Norway	FW	2006–2009	9 April 2007	75	14	
Toni Koskela	Finland	MF	2007–2008	9 April 2007	57	4	
Mame Biram Diouf	Senegal	FW	2007–2009	9 April 2007	86	45	
Aksel Berget Skjølsvik	Norway	MF	2007–2010	9 April 2007	87	11	
Thomas Holm	Norway	MF	2008–2011	30 March 2008	80	4	
Christian Steen	Norway	DF	2008–2011	20 April 2008	74	9	
José Mota	Brazil	FW	2008–2011	30 March 2008	72	30	
Makhtar Thioune	Senegal	MF	2009–2011	15 March 2009	81	12	
Baye Djiby Fall	Senegal	FW	2010	14 March 2010	34	19	
Emil Johansson	Sweden	DF	2010–2011	14 March 2010	39	1	
Magnus Stamnestrø	Norway	MF	2010–2012	6 June 2010	26	3	
Espen Bugge Pettersen	Norway	GK	2010–2014	1 August 2010	76	0	
Davy Claude Angan	Ivory Coast	FW	2011–2012	18 March 2011	71	33	
Josh Gatt	USA	U	2011–2016	18 March 2011	74	12	
Zlatko Tripić	Norway	MF	2011–2013	4 August 2011	57	4	
Jo Inge Berget	Norway	FW	2011–2013	22 August 2011	86	22	
Emmanuel Ekpo	Nigeria	MF	2012–2014	23 March 2012	53	1	
Even Hovland	Norway	DF	2012–2014	23 March 2012	69	4	
Agnaldo Pinto de Moraes Júnior	Brazil	MF	2013–2016	17 April 2013	55	5	
Ørjan Nyland	Norway	GK	2013–2015	17 April 2013	84	0	
Per-Egil Flo	Norway	DF	2013–2016	27 July 2013	98	7	
Tommy Høiland	Norway	FW	2013–2015	27 July 2013	62	20	
Fredrik Gulbrandsen	Norway	FW	2013–2016, 2023–	31 July 2013	68	28	
Mohamed Elyounoussi	Norway	MF	2014–2016	28 March 2014	93	42	
Björn Bergmann Sigurðarson	Iceland	FW	2014; 2016–2017; 2021–2022	28 March 2014	67	25	
Eirik Haugan	Norway	DF	2014–2015; 2022–	24 April 2014	81	2	
Ethan Horvath	USA	GK	2014–2016	24 April 2014	56	0	
Ola Kamara	Norway	FW	2015	7 April 2015	43	21	
Petter Strand	Norway	MF	2016–2018	25 February 2016	92	9	
Isak Ssewankambo	Sweden	DF	2016–2018	13 March 2016	37	0	
Thomas Amang	Cameroon	FW	2016–2018	1 April 2016	50	11	
Stian Rode Gregersen	Norway	DF	2016–21	17 July 2016	98	4	
Fredrik Brustad	Norway	FW	2016–2018	23 July 2016	65	15	
Babacar Sarr	Senegal	U	2016–2018	23 July 2016	79	6	
Christoffer Remmer	Denmark	DF	2016–2019	14 August 2016	81	1	
Erling Haaland	Norway	FW	2017–2018	26 April 2017	50	20	
Leke James	Nigeria	FW	2018–20	26 July 2018	83	43	
Eirik Ulland Andersen	Norway	MF	2019–2023	31 March 2019	64	21	
Kristoffer Haraldseid	Norway	DF	2019–22	31 March 2019	36	1	
Fredrik Sjølstad	Norway	MF	2019–21	7 April 2019	33	1	
Álex Craninx	Belgium	GK	2019–2023	1 May 2019	29	0	
Mathis Bolly	Ivory Coast	FW	2019–22	18 July 2019	67	6	
Tobias Christensen	Norway	MF	2019–21	25 August 2019	31	2	
Henry Wingo	United States	MF	2019–20	20 October 2019	28	2	
Marcus Holmgren Pedersen	Norway	DF	2020–21	16 June 2020	38	3	
Sheriff Sinyan	Gambia	DF	2020–2023	5 July 2020	62	3	
Birk Risa	Norway	DF	2020–2023	25 October 2020	95	3	
Datro Fofana	Ivory Coast	FW	2021–22	18 February 2021	65	24	
Sivert Mannsverk	Norway	MF	2021–2023	1 August 2021	87	8	
Rafik Zekhnini	Norway	FW	2021–2023	19 September 2021	41	3	
Benjamin Hansen	Denmark	DF	2022–2023	13 March 2022	65	1	
Markus André Kaasa	Norway	MF	2022–	13 March 2022	73	11	
Jacob Karlstrøm	Norway	GK	2022–	13 March 2022	77	0	
Anders Hagelskjær	Denmark	DF	2023–	12 March 2023	37	0	
Mathias Løvik	Norway	DF	2021-	25 July 2021	63	3	
Eric Kitolano	Norway	MF	2023–	12 March 2023	37	0	
Kristian Eriksen	Norway	MF	2022-	4 August 2022	71	14	
Niklas Ødegård	Norway	FW	2021-	25 July 2021	38	6	
Veton Berisha	Norway	FW	2023–	12 March 2023	39	7	

== Notes ==
- A utility player is one who is considered to play in more than one position.
