= Mattias Moström =

Swedish footballer

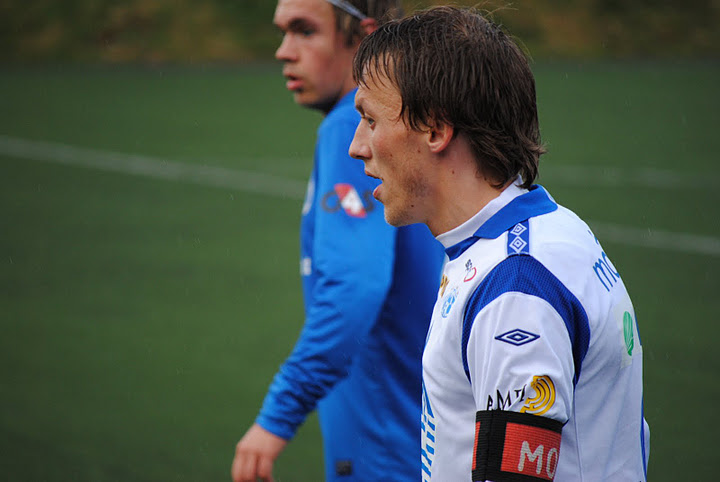
- Moström in 2011 with Molde

Personal information
- Full name: Mattias Kent Moström
- Date of birth: 25 February 1983 (age 43)
- Place of birth: Stockholm, Sweden
- Height: 1.79 m (5 ft 10 in)
- Position: Right midfielder

Team information
- Current team: Træff

Youth career
- 1990–2000: AIK

Senior career*
Years	Team	Apps	(Gls)
2001–2003	FC Café Opera	47	(4)
2004–2006	AIK	65	(5)
2007–2020	Molde	290	(28)
2022–	Træff	4	(0)

International career
2000	Sweden U17	11	(0)
2004	Sweden U21	4	(0)
Medal record
Molde
Winner	Tippeligaen	2011
Winner	Tippeligaen	2012
Winner	Norwegian Football Cup	2013
Winner	Tippeligaen	2014
Winner	Norwegian Football Cup	2014
Winner	Eliteserien	2019
- * Club domestic league appearances and goals as of 28 August 2022

Mattias Kent Moström (born 25 February 1983) is a Swedish professional footballer who plays as a right midfielder for SK Træff. He played most of his career for Norwegian Eliteserien club Molde. He started his career with AIK, before he made his senior debut with FC Café Opera. He later returned to AIK before he moved to Molde in 2007.

== Career ==
=== Early career ===
Moström was born in Stockholm and started to play football at AIK at the age of six and was selected for the club's development squad during his youth. He transferred to FC Café Opera ahead of the 2001 season, where he made his senior debut. He played three seasons for the club.

=== AIK ===
In 2004, Moström returned to his old club AIK, where he signed a contract till the end of the 2007 season.

Moström made his debut in Allsvenskan when he came on as a substitute in the opening match of the 2004 season against Sundsvall. He started his first match for AIK against Halmstad in the fifth round, and soon became a regular in AIK's starting line-up. Moström scored his first goal in Allsvenskan when he scored the match-winning goal against Landskrona on 23 May 2004.

After the 2006 season, AIK's new head coach Rikard Norling told Moström that he wasn't a part of his future plans and that he was free to find himself a new club. Moström who had played for AIK for a total of 14 seasons, then stated that he wanted to move abroad so that he did not have to meet AIK in a match.

=== Molde ===
Mattias Moström signed a three-year contract with the Norwegian First Division club Molde in January 2007, despite being wanted by the Tippeligaen club Aalesund. He made his Molde debut on 9 April 2007 in the 2–3 win on away ground against Sogndal.

Moström signed a pre-contract with the Swedish club Kalmar FF in July 2011, and was going to join the club when his contract with Molde expired after the 2011 season. Moström did however change his mind, and asked Kalmar FF if they could destroy the contract, and instead he signed a new contract with Molde lasting till the end of the 2014 season. He made 27 appearances and scored three goals in the 2011 Tippeligaen season where Molde won the first top-flight title in club history. In 2012, after six seasons with Molde, Moström became the foreign player with the most matches for Molde. Moström played 28 games and scored five goals in the 2012 league season, where Molde succeeded in defending the league title. Molde won the Norwegian Cup in 2013, where Moström contributed in all games from the third round to the final. In July 2014, Moström and Molde agreed on a two-year contract extension that kept him at the club till the end of the 2016 season. In August 2016, his contract with Molde was extended to last till the end of the 2018 season. On 5 May 2019, Moström got his 250th appearance in Eliteserien, in the club's 2–1 win away against Haugesund. As of 1 December 2019, Moström has made 357 appearances for Molde, the fifth-highest number of appearances by any player for the club. Alongside Trond Strande and Vegard Forren, he is the only player to have appearances for Molde in 12 consecutive Eliteserien seasons.

In 2022 he made a comeback for Molde FK's city neighbors SK Træff. (Note: Mattias Moström at the Norwegian Football Federation (in Norwegian))

== Personal life ==
Moström's younger half-brother, Marcus West, is also a professional footballer. Ahead of the 2014 season, the two played against each other for the first time when Molde met AIK in a pre-season friendly match.

== Career statistics ==
As of 19 December 2020

Appearances and goals by club, season and competition
Club	Season	League			Cup		Europe		Total	
Club	Season	Division	Apps	Goals	Apps	Goals	Apps	Goals	Apps	Goals
AIK	2004	Allsvenskan	19	3	1	0	—		20	3
AIK	2005	Superettan	27	2	1	0	—		28	2
AIK	2006	Allsvenskan	19	0	1	0	—		20	0
AIK	Total		65	5	3	0	—	—	68	5
Molde	2007	1. divisjon	17	1	1	0	—		17	1
Molde	2008	Eliteserien	18	1	2	0	—		20	2
Molde	2009	Eliteserien	26	2	6	2	—		32	4
Molde	2010	Eliteserien	28	3	2	0	4	1	34	4
Molde	2011	Eliteserien	27	3	5	3	—		31	6
Molde	2012	Eliteserien	28	5	4	0	11	1	43	5
Molde	2013	Eliteserien	26	3	5	0	4	0	35	3
Molde	2014	Eliteserien	28	2	5	1	2	0	35	3
Molde	2015	Eliteserien	19	2	1	0	11	1	31	3
Molde	2016	Eliteserien	20	1	0	0	2	0	22	1
Molde	2017	Eliteserien	6	0	0	0	—		6	0
Molde	2018	Eliteserien	18	2	1	0	3	0	22	2
Molde	2019	Eliteserien	20	2	3	0	4	0	27	2
Molde	2020	Eliteserien	9	1	—		2	0	11	1
Molde	Total		290	28	35	6	43	3	368	37
Career total			355	33	38	6	43	3	436	42

== Honours ==
Molde

- Tippeligaen/Eliteserien: 2011, 2012, 2014, 2019
- Norwegian Cup: 2013, 2014
