= Daniel Berg Hestad =

Norwegian footballer and manager (born 1975)

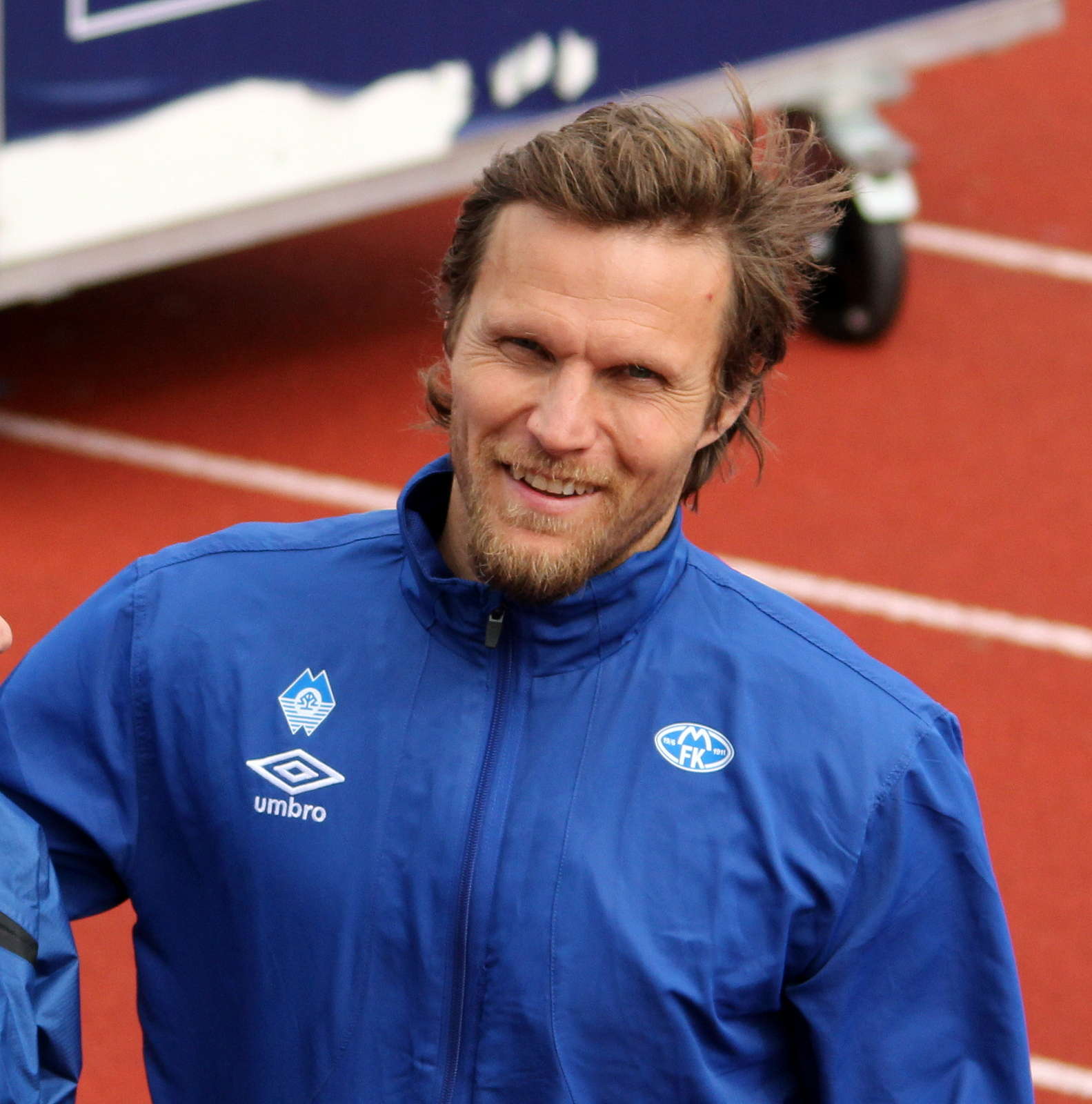
- Hestad training with Molde in 2013

Personal information
- Date of birth: 30 July 1975 (age 51)
- Place of birth: Molde, Norway
- Height: 1.84 m (6 ft 0 in)
- Position: Central midfielder

Team information
- Current team: KI Klaksvik (Assistant manager)

Youth career
- Molde

Senior career*
Years	Team	Apps	(Gls)
1993–2003	Molde	258	(55)
2003–2005	SC Heerenveen	41	(5)
2005–2016	Molde	258	(25)
Total		557	(85)

International career
1995–1998	Norway U21	27	(12)
1998	Norway U23	3	(0)
1998–2003	Norway	8	(0)

Managerial career
- 2017–2022: Molde 2 (U19)
- 2023: KÍ Klaksvik (assistant)
- 2024–: Molde 2
Medal record
Molde
Winner	Norwegian Football Cup	1994
Winner	Norwegian Football Cup	2005
Winner	Tippeligaen	2011
Winner	Tippeligaen	2012
Winner	Norwegian Football Cup	2013
Winner	Tippeligaen	2014
Winner	Norwegian Football Cup	2014
- * Club domestic league appearances and goals

Daniel Berg Hestad (born 30 July 1975) is a Norwegian football manager and a former player, who played as a central midfielder, most notably for Molde. He is the manager of Molde 2 and the Under-19 squad of Molde. With 666 official appearances, he is the player with most official matches for Molde. He currently holds the record for most matches in Eliteserien with 473. He is three time Norwegian league champion, and four times Norwegian Cup champion with Molde, being the joint most decorated player of the club with seven trophies along with Etzaz Hussain.

He retired from football after playing the Europa League round of 32 game against Sevilla which Molde won 1–0, 25 February 2016, in his 666th match for Molde.

== Club career ==
=== Molde ===
Berg Hestad debuted for Molde in the Tippeligaen match against Start on 23 May 1993. On 23 October 1994, he was in the starting lineup in Molde's team in the final of the 1994 Norwegian Cup against Lyn. He played 80 minutes in the game Molde won 3–2 and secured the club's first ever major trophy. Hestad became runner-up three times in the league (1995, 1998, 1999) before leaving the club in January 2004.

=== Heerenveen ===
On 4 July 2003, Hestad announced that he would leave Molde to join Dutch side Heerenveen on a free transfer from 1 January 2004. He signed a two-and-a-half-year contract with the club. He played well in the beginning of his Heerenveen career, and drew attention from several clubs, including Tottenham Hotspur. He played a total of 53 games and scored 5 goals in all competitions during his two seasons at Heerenveen.

=== Second spell at Molde ===
Hestad returned to Molde in July 2005. In his first season back, he helped his team winning the club's second trophy. He scored the third goal in the 2005 Norwegian Cup final which Molde won 4–2 against Lillestrøm after extra time. Molde were relegated to 1. divisjon in 2006, thus Hestad played in the second tier, for the first time since the 1994 season, in the 2007 season. Hestad was five times runner-up in Tippeligaen with Molde (1995, 1998, 1999, 2002 and 2009) before he finally could lift the trophy as captain of the 2011 Champions.

In 2012, after winning two consecutive Tippeligaen titles, it was speculated whether Berg Hestad would retire. He did, however, sign a new one-year contract ahead of the 2013 season. He was one of Molde's best players during the season, and in September 2013 he told the club that he would sign a new contract for one more year if the offer was good enough. On 24 November 2013, he won his seventh trophy with Molde after coming in as a substitute in the 2013 Norwegian Cup final, a game Molde won 4–2 against main rival Rosenborg. When he signed a new one-year extension in November 2013, the manager Ole Gunnar Solskjær stated that Berg Hestad would be a part of Molde's coaching staff during the 2014 season. Hestad became the oldest goalscorer in the European competitions on 5 November 2015, when he scored the 2–1 winning goal in a Europa League match against Celtic aged 40 years and 99 days. This record was broken by Joaquín on 15 September 2022, when he scored a goal against PFC Ludogorets Razgrad at the age of 41 years and 56 days. On 25 February 2016, Hestad retired from football after playing the Europa League round of 32 game against Sevilla, his 666th match for Molde, which Molde won 1–0. With 473 matches in Eliteserien, he is the player with the most matches in the history of the top-tier in Norwegian football.

== International career ==
Hestad played a total of 30 games for Norway at youth and under-23 level. In 1998, he was a part of the Norway U21 national team, that won bronze medal in 1998 UEFA European Under-21 Football Championship. In the final qualifier before the tournament he captained the Norwegian side against a French side containing Thierry Henry, David Trezeguet, Patrick Vieira and Ludovic Giuly. Hestad scored the third goal for Norway to put them 3–0 up in Valenciennes. Norway ended up winning 3–2 and qualified.

Hestad earned eight caps for the Norway national team, between 1998 and 2003. He made his debut against Denmark on 22 April 1998 and got his last appearance in Norway's 2–1 against Oman on 28 January 2003.

== Personal life ==
Hestad grew up in a family who contains a long line of Molde players. His father Stein Olav Hestad held the club record for most first-team appearances of all time before this was beaten by Daniel. His paternal uncle Harry Hestad, and his maternal uncles Odd Berg and Jan Berg also played many years at the club. His younger brother Peter Berg Hestad was also in Molde's squad for a few years, but only made a handful of first-team appearances.

He married Trude Vik in 2006, with whom he has two sons, Tobias and Jonathan.

In 2000, he served time in prison for driving under the influence. This incident occurred during Molde's Christmas party after Berg Hestad was informed of the hospitalisation of his wife and their infant baby. Both were in a critical state and in a moment of poor judgement, Berg Hestad got in his car to drive to the hospital, only to crash after a few hundred meters.

== Career statistics ==
=== Club ===
Appearances and goals by club, season and competition
Club	Season	Division	League		Cup		Europe		Other		Total	
Club	Season	Division	Apps	Goals	Apps	Goals	Apps	Goals	Apps	Goals	Apps	Goals
Molde	1993	Tippeligaen	15	1	4	2	—		1 (Note: One appearance in Tippeligaen relegation play-offs)	0	20	3
Molde	1994	1. divisjon	19	0	8	3	—		—		27	3
Molde	1995	Tippeligaen	26	4	3	1	4	0	—		33	5
Molde	1996	Tippeligaen	25	4	4	0	2	0	—		31	4
Molde	1997	Tippeligaen	25	13	1	0	—		—		26	13
Molde	1998	Tippeligaen	24	8	3	2	2	0	—		29	10
Molde	1999	Tippeligaen	25	4	6	1	10	3	—		41	8
Molde	2000	Tippeligaen	26	3	3	0	2	0	—		31	3
Molde	2001	Tippeligaen	26	9	4	3	—		—		30	12
Molde	2002	Tippeligaen	26	4	3	0	—		—		29	4
Molde	2003	Tippeligaen	21	5	2	0	6	3	—		29	8
Molde	Total		258	55	41	12	26	6	1	0	326	73
Heerenveen	2003–04	Eredivisie	15	1	2	0	0	0	—		17	1
Heerenveen	2004–05	Eredivisie	26	4	4	0	6	0	—		36	4
Heerenveen	Total		41	5	6	0	6	0	0	0	53	5
Molde	2005	Tippeligaen	14	3	3	2	—		2 (Note: Two appearances in Tippeligaen relegation play-offs)	0	19	5
Molde	2006	Tippeligaen	24	3	3	2	4	0	—		31	5
Molde	2007	Adeccoligaen	24	8	0	0	—		—		24	8
Molde	2008	Tippeligaen	25	4	6	1	—		—		31	5
Molde	2009	Tippeligaen	27	0	7	1	—		—		34	1
Molde	2010	Tippeligaen	26	3	2	0	4	0	—		32	3
Molde	2011	Tippeligaen	28	0	3	0	—		—		31	0
Molde	2012	Tippeligaen	24	2	3	0	10	0	—		37	2
Molde	2013	Tippeligaen	19	1	5	0	6	0	—		30	1
Molde	2014	Tippeligaen	25	1	5	1	3	0	—		33	2
Molde	2015	Tippeligaen	22	0	3	0	11	1	—		36	1
Molde	2016	Tippeligaen	0	0	0	0	2	0	—		2	0
Molde	Total		258	25	40	7	40	1	2	0	340	33
Career total			557	85	87	19	72	7	3	0	719	111

=== International ===
Appearances and goals by national team and year
National team	Year	Apps	Goals
Norway	1998	3	0
Norway	1999	2	0
Norway	2000	0	0
Norway	2001	0	0
Norway	2002	1	0
Norway	2003	2	0
Total		8	0

== Honours ==
Molde

- Tippeligaen: 2011, 2012, 2014
- Norwegian Football Cup: 1994, 2005, 2013, 2014
- 1. divisjon: 2007

Records

- Molde player to have won seven domestic trophies along with Etzaz Hussain
- Most Eliteserien appearances for a player, with 473
- Oldest (40 years, 98 days) player to score in the UEFA Europa League
- Most appearances by a Molde player, with 666
