= Makhtar Thioune =

Senegalese footballer

Personal information
- Full name: El Hadji Makhtar Thioune
- Date of birth: 5 August 1984 (age 42)
- Place of birth: Richard Toll, Senegal
- Height: 1.77 m (5 ft 10 in)
- Position: Midfielder

Team information
- Current team: Træff
- Number: 30

Youth career
- 2001–2004: ASC Linguère

Senior career*
Years	Team	Apps	(Gls)
2004–2006	Port Autonome	?	(?)
2006–2008	Sarpsborg 08	75	(8)
2009–2012	Molde	71	(10)
2012	→ Karlsruher SC (loan)	8	(0)
2012–2016	Viking	78	(4)
2016	Şanlıurfaspor	12	(0)
2017	Alta	20	(2)
2018	Vidar	22	(3)
2019	Hinna	14	(4)
2021	Træff	6	(1)

International career
2006–2013	Senegal	12	(0)
- * Club domestic league appearances and goals

Makhtar Thioune (born 5 August 1984) is a Senegalese footballer who plays as a central midfielder for Træff. He has previously played for Sarpsborg 08, Molde and Viking, among others, in Norway, Karlsruher SC in Germany and Şanlıurfaspor in Turkey.

== Club career ==
After playing for ASC Linguère and Port Autonome, before he joined Norwegian club Sarpsborg Sparta FK in 2006. After two years in Sarpsborg, Thioune was brought to Molde by head coach Kjell Jonevret and was one of the key players when Molde finished second in the league and the cup in 2009.

In January 2012, he was loaned out to German 2. Bundesliga club Karlsruher SC and returned after the end of Contract on 30 June to Molde FK. He then decided to leave Molde, as he did not get many chances in Ole Gunnar Solskjær's team. Thioune transferred to Viking FK and signed a contract lasting till the end of the 2015-season, and was reunited with his old coach in Molde, Kjell Jonevret.

After a stint with Sanliurfaspor in Turkey, he returned to Norway. After a trial with Egersunds IK he signed for Alta IF. Thioune signed with Norwegian Fourth Division club Hinna Fotball for the 2019 season. He joined Norwegian Third Division side Træff for the 2021 season.

== International ==
Thioune has been capped eleven times for Senegal.

== Career statistics ==
=== Club ===
Appearances and goals by club, season and competition
Club	Season	Division	League		Cup		Europe		Total	
Club	Season	Division	Apps	Goals	Apps	Goals	Apps	Goals	Apps	Goals
Sarpsborg 08	2006	1. divisjon	21	4	0	0	—		21	4
Sarpsborg 08	2007	1. divisjon	25	3	0	0	—		25	3
Sarpsborg 08	2008	1. divisjon	29	1	1	1	—		30	2
Sarpsborg 08	Total		75	8	1	1	—		76	9
Molde	2009	Tippeligaen	26	4	5	2	—		31	6
Molde	2010	Tippeligaen	18	2	1	0	4	0	23	2
Molde	2011	Tippeligaen	27	4	0	0	—		27	4
Molde	Total		71	10	6	2	4	0	81	12
Karlsruher SC (loan)	2011–12	2. Bundesliga	8	0	2	0	—		10	0
Viking	2012	Tippeligaen	12	2	0	0	—		12	2
Viking	2013	Tippeligaen	19	1	2	1	—		21	2
Viking	2014	Tippeligaen	24	1	4	0	—		28	1
Viking	2015	Tippeligaen	23	0	1	0	—		24	0
Viking	Total		78	4	7	1	—		85	5
Şanlıurfaspor	2015–16	TFF First League	12	0	2	0	—		14	0
Alta	2017	2. divisjon	20	2	1	1	—		21	3
Vidar	2018	2. divisjon	22	3	2	0	—		24	3
Hinna	2019	4. divisjon	14	4	4	1	—		18	5
Træff	2021	3. divisjon	6	1	1	0	—		7	1
Career total			306	32	26	6	4	0	336	38

=== International ===
Appearances and goals by national team and year
National team	Year	Apps	Goals
Senegal	2006	1	0
Senegal	2007	–	
Senegal	2008	–	
Senegal	2009	3	0
Senegal	2010	3	0
Senegal	2011	3	0
Senegal	2012	1	0
Senegal	2013	1	0
Total		12	0

== Honours ==
Individual

- Verdens Gang Norwegian Premier League Player of the Year: 2009
