= Aksel Berget Skjølsvik =

Norwegian footballer (born 1987)

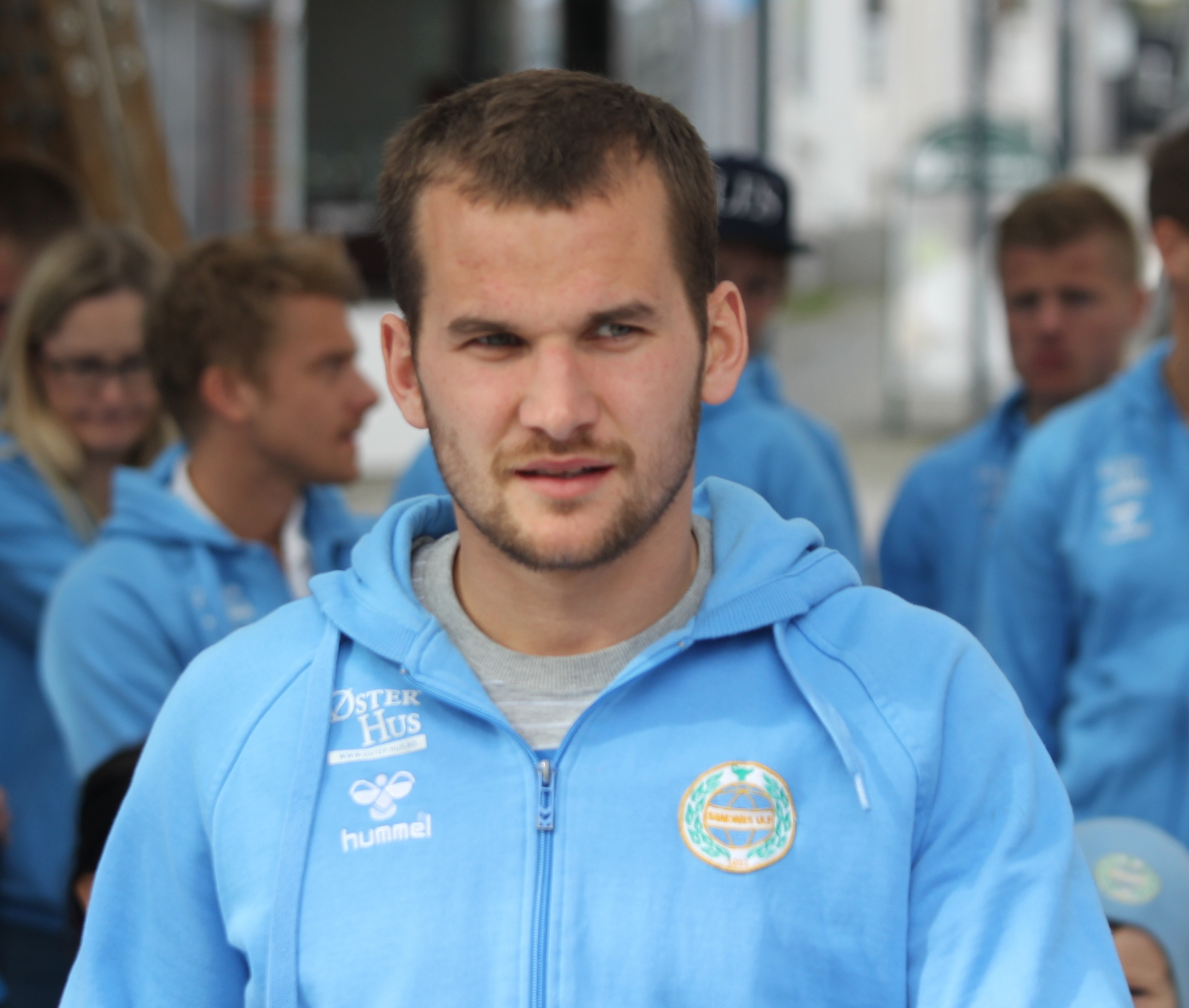

Personal information
- Full name: Aksel Berget Skjølsvik
- Date of birth: 15 May 1987 (age 39)
- Place of birth: Åndalsnes, Norway
- Height: 1.74 m (5 ft 8 1/2 in)
- Positions: Midfielder; second striker

Team information
- Current team: Åndalsnes

Youth career
- Åndalsnes IF
- 2004–2006: Rosenborg BK

Senior career*
Years	Team	Apps	(Gls)
2006	Rosenborg	0	(0)
2007–2010	Molde	72	(7)
2011–2016	Sandnes Ulf	159	(31)
2017	Brattvåg	16	(4)
2018	Åndalsnes	14	(7)

International career
2003	Norway U16	2	(0)
2004	Norway U17	2	(0)
- * Club domestic league appearances and goals as of 11 May 2018

Aksel Berget Skjølsvik (born 15 May 1987) is a Norwegian former footballer who played as a midfielder or striker.

Skjølsvik started his football career with Åndalsnes IF. When he was 16 years old, he went to Rosenborg BK. Originally a second striker, Skjølsvik learned to play as an attacking midfielder as well in 2006. Skjølsvik is currently under contract with Sandnes Ulf from 2011 and is the team captain. On 9 December he signed a two-year deal with Sandnes Ulf. After the 2016 season Skjølsvik decided to retire from football to focus on his family.

Nonetheless he featured briefly for fourth-tier Brattvåg IL before joining fifth-tier Åndalsnes ahead of the 2018 season.

He represented his country at youth level.

== Career statistics ==
Club	Season	Division	League		Cup		Europe		Total	
Club	Season	Division	Apps	Goals	Apps	Goals	Apps	Goals	Apps	Goals
Molde	2007	1. divisjon	17	0	1	0	—		18	0
Molde	2008	Tippeligaen	12	2	4	1	—		16	3
Molde	2009	Tippeligaen	17	2	3	2	—		20	4
Molde	2010	Tippeligaen	26	3	3	1	4	0	33	4
Molde	Total		72	7	11	4	4	0	87	11
Sandnes Ulf	2011	1. divisjon	28	12	3	0	—		31	12
Sandnes Ulf	2012	Tippeligaen	25	6	1	0	—		26	6
Sandnes Ulf	2013	Tippeligaen	27	2	2	0	—		29	2
Sandnes Ulf	2014	Tippeligaen	23	1	0	0	—		23	1
Sandnes Ulf	2015	1. divisjon	28	8	1	1	—		29	9
Sandnes Ulf	2016	1. divisjon	29	2	4	0	—		33	2
Sandnes Ulf	Total		160	31	11	1	0	0	171	32
Career Total			233	38	22	5	4	0	259	43
