= Rune Ertsås =

Norwegian footballer (born 1987)

Personal information
- Date of birth: 24 May 1987 (age 39)
- Place of birth: Steinkjer, Norway
- Position: Forward

Senior career*
Years	Team	Apps	(Gls)
2003–2006	Steinkjer	37	(28)
2006–2010	Molde	66	(12)
2010	→ Sandefjord (loan)	16	(2)
2010–2012	Vejle	19	(4)
2012	Alta	20	(6)
2013	Hødd	24	(2)
2014	Alta	26	(4)
2015–2017	Steinkjer	61	(57)

International career^{‡}
2007	Norway U21	3	(0)
- * Club domestic league appearances and goals as of 29 July 2017 ‡ National team caps and goals as of 3 June 2007

Rune Ertsås (born 24 May 1987) is a retired Norwegian footballer who last played as a forward for Steinkjer. He has previously played in Tippeligaen for Molde and Sandefjord.

== Career ==
The young Norwegian striker was bought by Molde from Steinkjer in 2006. Ertsås was loaned out from Molde loaned to Sandefjord in the first half of the 2010-season, and scored the match-winning goal when Sandefjord won 2–1 against Molde on 21 March 2010. On 5 August 2010 he signed a two-year deal with Vejle. In March 2012, Ertsås signed with Norwegian First Division side Alta after being released from his contract with Vejle. He scored six goals in 20 matches for Alta during the 2012 season, when the team was relegated from the First Division. Ahead of the 2013 season, Ertsås signed a two-year contract with Hødd.

He retired after the 2017 season.

== Career statistics ==
As of 29 July 2017

Season	Club	Division	League		Cup		Europe		Total		Note
Season	Club	Division	Apps	Goals	Apps	Goals	Apps	Goals	Apps	Goals	Note
2005	Steinkjer	2. divisjon	26	18	0	0	—		26	18	
2006	Steinkjer	2. divisjon	11	10	0	0	—		11	10	
2006	Molde	Tippeligaen	6	0	0	0	1	0	7	0	
2007	Molde	Adeccoligaen	23	7	0	0	—		23	7	
2008	Molde	Tippeligaen	16	1	3	0	—		19	1	
2009	Molde	Tippeligaen	21	4	5	2	—		26	6	
2010	Sandefjord	Tippeligaen	16	2	2	0	—		18	2	
2010–11	Vejle	1st Division	18	4	1	1	—		19	5	
2011–12	Vejle	1st Division	1	0	0	0	—		1	0	
2012	Alta	1. divisjon	20	6	2	0	—		22	6	
2013	Hødd	1. divisjon	24	2	1	0	2	0	27	2	
2014	Alta	1. divisjon	26	4	1	2	—		27	6	
2015	Steinkjer	3. divisjon	25	31	1	0	—		26	31	
2016	Steinkjer	3. divisjon	24	20	2	2	—		26	22	
2017	Steinkjer	3. divisjon	12	6	3	1	—		15	7	
Career total			269	115	21	8	3	0	293	123	
