= Brian Waltrip =

American soccer player (born 1978)

Personal information
- Full name: Brian Charles Waltrip
- Date of birth: January 12, 1978 (age 48)
- Place of birth: Pensacola, United States
- Height: 1.86 m (6 ft 1 in)
- Position: Forward

Youth career
- Clearwater Chargers Soccer Club
- University of South Florida
- São Paulo FC
- VFB Stuttgart

Senior career*
Years	Team	Apps	(Gls)
1999–2000	Racing Club de Strasbourg		
2000–2001	Tampere United		
2001–2004	C.F. Os Belenenses		
- C.D. Olivais e Moscavide
2004–2005	Mandalskameratene		
2005–2006	Sandefjord		
2007	Sogndal		
2008–2010	Molde		
2010–2012	A.S. Laranja		

International career
- United States U20
- United States U23
- * Club domestic league appearances and goals

Brian Waltrip (born January 12, 1978) is an American former soccer player, who has played professionally in the United States, Finland, Portugal, Norway and Japan.

== Career ==
Waltrip was born in Pensacola, Florida. During his youth he played for both São Paulo FC of Brazil and VFB Stuttgart of Germany. He then went on to play college soccer at the University of South Florida and was a Hermann Trophy candidate in 1999. In 1999, he left university for an offer to play in France for Racing Club de Strasbourg. He was selected in the 2000 MLS Superdraft by the Tampa Bay Mutiny. He opted out of this contract and chose instead to play for Tampere United of the Veikkausliiga in Finland. Only half a season later he signed with C.D. Olivais e Moscavide and thereafter C.F. Os Belenenses of the Portuguese top league.

Leaving Portugal, Waltrip went back up north to play with Mandalskameratene in Norway. After one and a half successful seasons there his contract was bought by Sandefjord. He was there for another year and a half until January 2007 when he was bought by Sogndal. After another successful season he was bought by Molde FK. In 2010, he left Norway for Japan and spent the next 2 seasons with A.S. Laranja (Kansai League) in Kyoto, Japan.
