= Øyvind Gjerde =

Norwegian footballer (born 1977)

Personal information
- Full name: Øyvind Gjerde
- Date of birth: 18 March 1977 (age 49)
- Place of birth: Åndalsnes, Norway
- Height: 1.78 m (5 ft 10 in)
- Position: Defender

Senior career*
Years	Team	Apps	(Gls)
- Åndalsnes
1997–1999	Lillestrøm		
2001–2003	Aalesund	37	(5)
2004–2010	Molde	85	(4)
- * Club domestic league appearances and goals as of 1 November 2011

Øyvind Gjerde (born 18 March 1977) is a Norwegian former footballer who played for Molde. He has previously played for the clubs Åndalsnes, Lillestrøm and Aalesund.

After the 2010 season, when he did not get a new contract with Molde after 7 years in the club, Gjerde announced that he would most likely retire.
