= Christian Steen (footballer) =

Norwegian footballer (born 1977)

Personal information
- Date of birth: July 2, 1977 (age 49)
- Place of birth: Trondheim, Norway
- Height: 1.93 m (6 ft 4 in)
- Position: Centre back

Youth career
- Astor FK

Senior career*
Years	Team	Apps	(Gls)
1997	Rosenborg	2	(0)
1998–2002	Bodø/Glimt	101	(1)
2003–2005	Aalesund	67	(4)
2006–2007	Tromsø	39	(1)
2008–2011	Molde FK	59	(4)
- * Club domestic league appearances and goals as of July 30, 2011

Christian Steen (born 2 July 1977) is a former Norwegian football player. He played as a centre back.

Steen started his career with Astor. He has played for Rosenborg BK, Bodø/Glimt, Aalesunds FK, and Tromsø IL. He joined Tromsø in January 2006. On 30 November 2007, after passing a physical test, he agreed terms with Molde FK. He retired after the 2011 season.

== Private ==
His sisters Pia and Ingrid Steen are both former professional handball players.

== Career statistics ==
Season	Club	Division	League		Cup		Total	
Season	Club	Division	Apps	Goals	Apps	Goals	Apps	Goals
1997	Rosenborg	Tippeligaen	2	0	0	0	2	0
1998	Bodø/Glimt	Tippeligaen	17	0	0	0	17	0
1999	Bodø/Glimt	Tippeligaen	26	1	0	0	26	1
2000	Bodø/Glimt	Tippeligaen	24	0	4	0	28	0
2001	Bodø/Glimt	Tippeligaen	11	0	2	0	13	0
2002	Bodø/Glimt	Tippeligaen	23	0	4	1	27	1
2003	Aalesund	Tippeligaen	24	3	5	0	29	3
2004	Aalesund	Adeccoligaen	28	1	0	0	28	1
2005	Aalesund	Tippeligaen	15	0	0	0	15	0
2006	Tromsø	Tippeligaen	13	0	2	0	15	0
2007	Tromsø	Tippeligaen	25	1	2	0	27	1
2008	Molde	Tippeligaen	10	1	3	1	13	2
2009	Molde	Tippeligaen	29	2	7	1	36	3
2010	Molde	Tippeligaen	14	1	3	2	17	3
2011	Molde	Tippeligaen	6	0	2	1	8	1
Career Total			267	10	34	6	301	16
