= Pape Paté Diouf =

Senegalese footballer

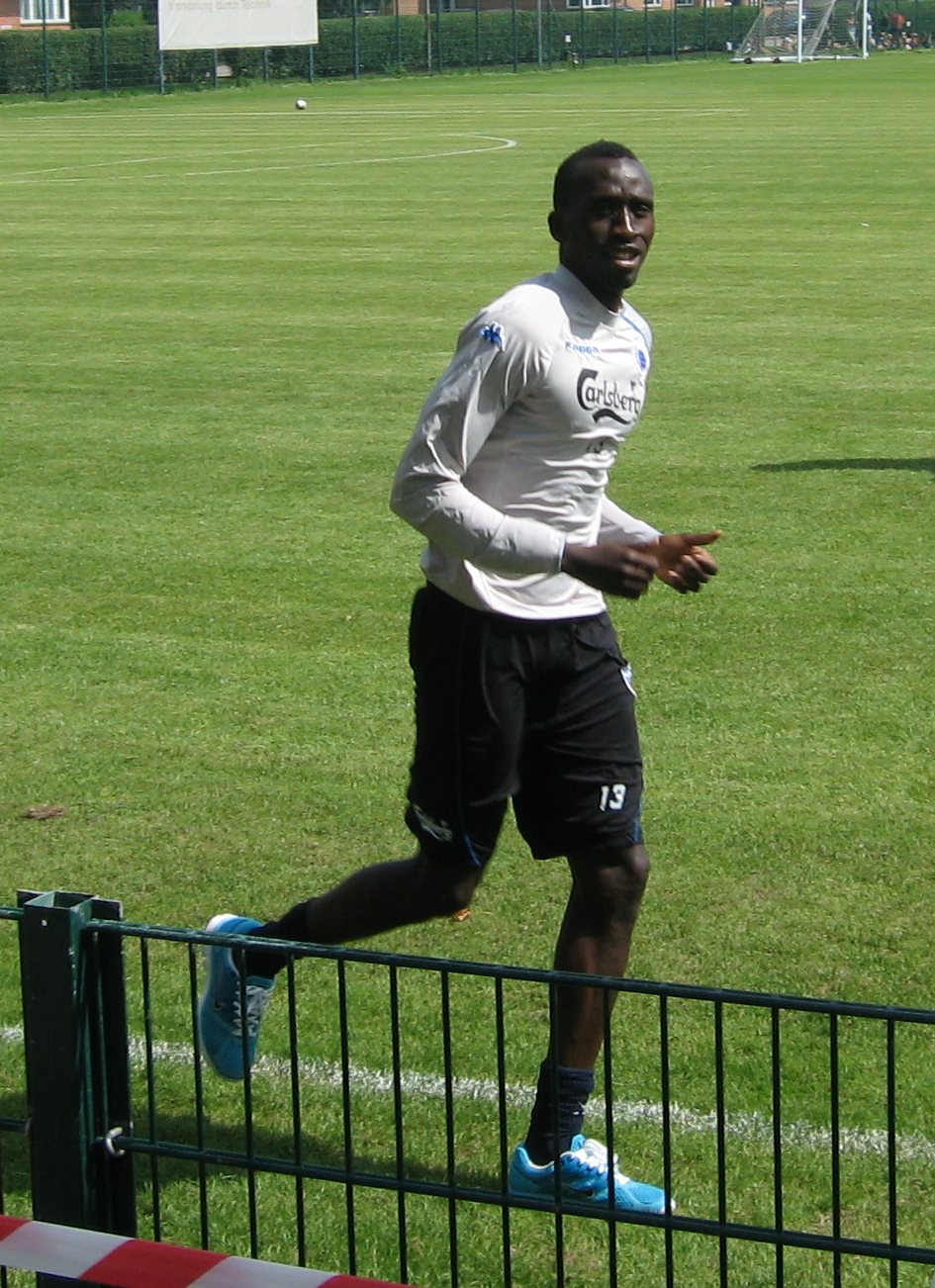
- Diouf training with FC Copenhagen in 2011

Personal information
- Full name: Pape Paté Diouf
- Date of birth: 4 April 1986 (age 40)
- Place of birth: Dakar, Senegal
- Height: 1.86 m (6 ft 1 in)
- Positions: Winger; striker

Youth career
- 2001–2005: Rufisque

Senior career*
Years	Team	Apps	(Gls)
2006–2011	Molde	113	(39)
2011–2014	Copenhagen	19	(4)
2012	→ Molde (loan)	9	(1)
2013	→ Esbjerg (loan)	8	(1)
2014–2017	Molde	16	(0)
2015	→ Odd (loan)	10	(5)
2017	Odd	13	(1)
2018–2019	Arendal	24	(6)
Total		212	(57)
Medal record
Molde
Winner	Tippeligaen	2011
Winner	Tippeligaen	2012
Winner	Tippeligaen	2014
Copenhagen
Winner	Danish Cup	2011–12
Winner	Superliga	2012–13
- * Club domestic league appearances and goals

Pape Paté Diouf (born 4 April 1986) is a Senegalese former professional footballer who last played as a striker. He played for clubs such as FC Copenhagen, Molde FK, and Odds BK.

== Career ==
Diouf began his career with SC de Rufisque and joined in January 2006 to Molde FK.

Following some impressive displays for Molde, Diouf moved to Superligaen side Copenhagen in the summer of 2011 for a reported DKK 18 mil fee.

After failing to make an impact for Copenhagen, Diouf was loaned back to his old club Molde, for the rest of the 2012 season, on 19 August 2012. In August 2013, he again moved on loan, this time to fellow Superligaen side Esbjerg fB.

On 31 March 2014, Diouf left Copenhagen permanently, returning to Molde on a three-year contract.

On 28 July 2015, Diouf moved to fellow Tippeligaen side Odds BK on loan for the remainder of the season.

== Career statistics ==
Appearances and goals by club, season and competition
Season	Club	League			Cup		Europe		Total	
Season	Club	Division	Apps	Goals	Apps	Goals	Apps	Goals	Apps	Goals
Molde	2006	Tippeligaen	14	5	2	1	3	0	19	6
Molde	2007	Adeccoligaen	23	6	0	0	–		23	6
Molde	2008	Tippeligaen	21	4	3	1	–		24	5
Molde	2009	Tippeligaen	28	11	7	3	–		35	14
Molde	2010	Tippeligaen	13	1	0	0	1	0	14	1
Molde	2011	Tippeligaen	14	12	1	1	–		15	13
Molde	Total		113	39	13	6	4	0	130	45
FC Copenhagen	2011–12	Danish Superliga	19	4	5	2	9	0	33	6
FC Copenhagen	2012–13	Danish Superliga	0	0	0	0	0	0	0	0
FC Copenhagen	Total		19	4	5	2	9	0	33	6
Molde (loan)	2012	Tippeligaen	9	1	0	0	7	2	16	3
Esbjerg fB (loan)	2013–14	Danish Superliga	8	1	0	0	4	1	12	2
Molde	2014	Tippeligaen	7	0	4	4	3	0	14	4
Molde	2015	Tippeligaen	7	0	4	1	0	0	11	1
Molde	2016	Tippeligaen	2	0	2	1	0	0	4	1
Molde	Total		16	0	10	6	3	0	29	6
Odd (loan)	2015	Tippeligaen	10	5	0	0	2	0	12	5
Odd	2017	Eliteserien	13	1	1	0	5	0	19	1
Arendal	2018	Norwegian Second Division	24	6	1	0	–		25	6
Career total			212	57	30	14	34	3	276	74

== Honours ==
Molde

- Tippeligaen: 2011, 2012, 2014

Copenhagen

- Danish Superliga: 2012–13
- Danish Cup: 2011–12
