= Valter Tomaz Júnior =

Brazilian footballer

Valter Tomaz Junior
Personal information
- Date of birth: July 25, 1978 (age 48)
- Place of birth: São Paulo, Brazil
- Height: 1.86 m (6 ft 1 in)
- Position: Centre back

Youth career
- Pequeninos do Jockey

Senior career*
| Years | Team | Apps | (Gls) |
| 1997–2006 | Örgryte IS | 142 | (3) |
| 2007–2010 | Molde FK | 28 | (2) |
| 2010–2011 | Örgryte IS | 23 | (0) |
| 2012–2013 | Assyriska BK | | |
- * Club domestic league appearances and goals as of 22 August 2009

Valter Tomaz Júnior (born July 25, 1978) is a Brazilian retired football player who last played for Assyriska BK and Örgryte IS and Molde FK before that.

== Club career ==
Valter signed for Assyriska BK in March 2012.

== After football ==
On 17 June 2025, Molde announced that Valter would return to the club as "Children's football manager" commencing 1 August 2025.

== Career statistics ==
| Season | Club | Division | League | | Cup | | Total | |
| Season | Club | Division | Apps | Goals | Apps | Goals | Apps | Goals |
|---|---|---|---|---|---|---|---|---|
| 2007 | Molde | Adeccoligaen | 24 | 2 | | | 24 | 2 |
| 2008 | Molde | Tippeligaen | 2 | 0 | 3 | 0 | 5 | 0 |
| 2009 | Molde | Tippeligaen | 2 | 0 | 0 | 0 | 2 | 0 |
| Career Total | | | 28 | 2 | | | 28 | 2 |
