= 2000 Odd Grenland season =

Odd Grenland
2000 season
- Manager: Arne Sandstø
- Stadium: Odd Stadion
- Tippeligaen: 8th
- Norwegian Cup: Winners

The 2000 season was the 106th season in the history of Odd Grenland and the second consecutive season in the Tippeligaen, the Norwegian Premier League. Furthermore, the club participated in the Norwegian Football Cup, winning it for a twelfth occasion, which was a record back then and their final title as of 2026.

== Squad ==
Pos.	Nat.	Player	Age	Signed from	Signed in
MF	(Finland)	Sami Petteri Mahlio	28	(Finland) MYPA	1999
GK	(Norway)	Erik Holtan	30	(Norway) Kongsvinger	1988
DF	(Norway)	Ronny Deila	24	(Norway) Urædd	1993
DF	(Norway)	Hendrik Alexander van Es Aas	21	(Norway) Odd Youth	1996
DF	(Norway)	Jan Frode Nornes	27	(Norway) Eik-Tønsberg	1999
DF	(Norway)	Bård Borgersen	27	(Norway) Bryne	1995
MF	(Norway)	Erik Pedersen	32	(Scotland) Dundee United	1999
DF	(Norway)	Morten Fevang	25	(Norway) Runar IL	1998
FW	(Norway)	Kim Larsen	23	(Norway) Lørenskog IF	2000
MF	(Norway)	Thomas Røed	25	(Norway) Strømsgodset	1999
MF	(Norway)	Espen Hoff	18	(Norway) Larvik Turn	1999
GK	(Norway)	Svein Roger Dahlen	25	(Norway) Eik-Tønsberg	1999
MF	(Denmark)	Christian Flindt Bjerg	26	(Norway) Viking FK	1999
FW	(Norway)	Kristian Bye-Andersen	24	(Norway) Eik-Tønsberg	2000
DF	(Norway)	Jan Gunnar Solli	18	(Norway) Odd Youth	2000
DF	(Norway)	Brede Bomhoff	23	(Norway) Tollnes	2000
FW	(Norway)	Tor Gunnar Johnsen	28	(Norway) Kongsvinger	1998
FW	(Norway)	Frode Johnsen	26	(Norway) Odd Youth	1994

== Transfers ==
=== In ===
Pos.	Player	Transferred from	Fee	Date	Source
FW	(Norway) Kristian Bye-Andersen	(Norway) Eik-Tønsberg		1 January 2000	
FW	(Norway) Kim Larsen	(Norway) Lørenskog IF		1 January 2000	
DF	(Norway) Brede Bomhoff	(Norway) Tollnes		17 February 2000	

=== Out ===
Pos.	Player	Transferred to	Fee	Date	Source
FW	(Norway) Frode Johnsen	(Norway) Rosenborg		9 June 2000	

== Competitions ==
=== Overall record ===
Competition	First match	Last match	Starting round	Final position	Record							
Competition	First match	Last match	Starting round	Final position	Pld	W	D	L	GF	GA	GD	Win %
Tippeligaen	9 April 2000	22 October 2000	Matchday 1	8th	26	11	5	10	40	31	+9	42.31
Norwegian Cup	28 June 2000	29 October 2000	Third round	Winners	5	4	1	0	19	4	+15	80.00
Total					31	15	6	10	59	35	+24	48.39

Source: Competitions

=== Tippeligaen ===
==== Table ====
Pos	Team	Pld	W	D	L	GF	GA	GD	Pts	Qualification or relegation
6	Lillestrøm	26	11	7	8	42	29	+13	40	
7	Molde	26	11	7	8	46	47	−1	40	
8	Odd Grenland	26	11	5	10	40	31	+9	38	Qualification for the UEFA Cup first round (Note: Odd Grenland qualified as the winner of the 2000 Norwegian Cup.)
9	Moss	26	8	8	10	38	44	−6	32	
10	Bodø/Glimt	26	6	10	10	48	59	−11	28	

Source: fotball.no
Rules for classification: 1) points; 2) goal difference; 3) number of goals scored.

==== Results summary ====
Overall								Home						Away					
Pld	W	D	L	GF	GA	GD	Pts	W	D	L	GF	GA	GD	W	D	L	GF	GA	GD
26	11	5	10	40	31	+9	38	9	2	2	33	15	+18	2	3	8	7	16	−9

==== Results by round ====
Round	1	2	3	4	5	6	7	8	9	10	11	12	13	14	15	16	17	18	19	20	21	22	23	24	25	26
Ground	A	H	A	H	A	H	A	H	H	A	H	A	H	H	A	H	A	H	A	H	A	A	H	A	H	A
Result	D	W	D	W	L	L	L	W	W	L	D	D	W	D	W	W	L	W	L	L	L	L	W	W	W	L
Position	9	4	4	3	5	5	8	8	6	6	7	7	7	6	5	4	6	5	7	8	8	8	8	8	8	8

Source: Tippeligaen
A = Away; H = Home; W = Win; D = Draw; L = Loss

==== Matches ====
9 April 2000 1	Moss	0–0	Odd Grenland	Moss
18:00 UTC+2				Stadium: Melløs Stadion

16 April 2000 2	Odd Grenland	2–0	Stabæk	Skien
18:00 UTC+2				Stadium: Odd Stadion

19 April 2000 3	Brann	0–0	Odd Grenland	Bergen
18:00 UTC+2				Stadium: Brann Stadion

30 April 2000 4	Odd Grenland	2–1	Lillestrøm	Skien
18:00 UTC+2				Stadium: Odd Stadion

3 May 2000 5	Molde	3–2	Odd Grenland	Molde
18:00 UTC+2				Stadium: Aker Stadion

6 May 2000 6	Odd Grenland	2–3	Viking	Skien
16:00 UTC+2				Stadium: Odd Stadion

10 May 2000 7	Rosenborg	2–0	Odd Grenland	Trondheim
19:00 UTC+2				Stadium: Lerkendal Stadion

13 May 2000 8	Odd Grenland	4–2	Haugesund	Skien
16:00 UTC+2				Stadium: Odd Stadion

16 May 2000 9	Odd Grenland	3–0	Start	Skien
18:00 UTC+2				Stadium: Odd Stadion

21 May 2000 10	Tromsø	2–0	Odd Grenland	Tromsø
18:00 UTC+2				Stadium: Alfheim Stadion

2 July 2000 11	Odd Grenland	2–2	Bodø/Glimt	Skien
17:00 UTC+2				Stadium: Odd Stadion

5 July 2000 12	Vålerenga	0–0	Odd Grenland	Oslo
19:00 UTC+2				Stadium: Ullevaal Stadion

9 July 2000 13	Odd Grenland	4–2	Bryne	Skien
18:00 UTC+2				Stadium: Odd Stadion

16 July 2000 14	Odd Grenland	2–2	Moss	Skien
18:00 UTC+2				Stadium: Odd Stadion

23 July 2000 15	Stabæk	1–2	Odd Grenland	Bekkestua
18:00 UTC+2				Stadium: Nadderud stadion

30 July 2000 16	Odd Grenland	2–0	Brann	Skien
18:00 UTC+2				Stadium: Odd Stadion

2 August 2000 17	Lillestrøm	2–0	Odd Grenland	Lillestrøm
19:00 UTC+2				Stadium: Åråsen stadion

6 August 2000 18	Odd Grenland	3–0	Molde	Skien
18:00 UTC+2				Stadium: Odd Stadion

13 August 2000 19	Viking	2–1	Odd Grenland	Stavanger
18:00 UTC+2				Stadium: Stavanger stadion 1

20 August 2000 20	Odd Grenland	0–3	Rosenborg	Skien
18:00 UTC+2				Stadium: Odd Stadion

27 August 2000 21	Haugesund	1–0	Odd Grenland	Haugesund
18:00 UTC+2				Stadium: Haugesund Sparebank Arena

10 September 2000 22	Start	1–0	Odd Grenland	Kristiansand
16:00 UTC+2				Stadium: Kristiansand stadion

17 September 2000 23	Odd Grenland	3–0	Tromsø	Skien
16:00 UTC+2				Stadium: Odd Stadion

1 October 2000 24	Bodø/Glimt	1–2	Odd Grenland	Bodø
15:00 UTC+2				Stadium: Aspmyra stadion

15 October 2000 25	Odd Grenland	4–0	Vålerenga	Skien
15:00 UTC+2				Stadium: Odd Stadion

22 October 2000 26	Bryne	1–0	Odd Grenland	Bryne
14:00 UTC+2				Stadium: Bryne stadion

=== Norwegian Cup ===
28 June 2000 Third round	Odd Grenland	6–1	Tollnes	Skien
18:00 UTC+2	Røed 26'; Deila 29', 45'; T. G. Johnsen 42'; Larsen 48'; Flindt Bjerg 81'	Report	Reime 60'	Stadium: Odd Stadion; Attendance: 616; Referee: Frode Kvam

19 July 2000 Fourth round	Strindheim	0–5	Odd Grenland	Trondheim
19:00 UTC+2		Report	Borgersen 55'; Hoff 61', 69', 75'; Nilssen 85'	Stadium: Lerkendal Stadion; Attendance: 360; Referee: Tor-Arne Fiskum

6 September 2000 Quarter-finals	Odd Grenland	2–2 (a.e.t.) (11–10 p)	Moss	Skien
17:30 UTC+2	Petteri Mahlio 89'; Borgersen 111'	Report	Bergersen 90'; Tangen 115'	Stadium: Odd Stadion; Attendance: 5,564; Referee: Frode Kvam
	Penalties
	Pedersen (penalty scored); Hansen (penalty scored); Mahlio (penalty scored); Deila (penalty scored); Larsen (penalty scored); Andersen (penalty scored); Fevang (penalty scored); Aas (penalty scored); Borgersen (penalty scored)		(penalty scored) Tangen; (penalty scored) Enerly; (penalty scored) Olofsson; (penalty scored) Bergersen; (penalty scored) Juliussen; (penalty scored) Wilbraham; (penalty scored) Ophaug; (penalty scored) Ramberg; (penalty missed) Winsnes

23 September 2000 Semi-finals	Odd Grenland	4–0	Bodø/Glimt	Skien
15:15 UTC+2	Larsen 7', 56'; Fevang 15', 30'	Report		Stadium: Odd Stadion; Attendance: 5,564; Referee: Rune Pedersen

29 October 2000 Final	Odd Grenland	2–1 (a.e.t.)	Viking	Oslo
13:15 UTC+2	Nornes 64'; Flindt Bjerg 106'	Report	Dahl 45'	Stadium: Ullevaal Stadion; Attendance: 24,864; Referee: Frode Kvam
