= 2000 Norwegian Football Cup =

Norgesmesterskapet i fotball for herrer

Tournament details
- Country: Norway
- Teams: 86 (main competition)

Final positions
- Champions: Odd Grenland (12th title)
- Runners-up: Viking

Tournament statistics
- Matches played: 85
- Goals scored: 301 (3.54 per match)

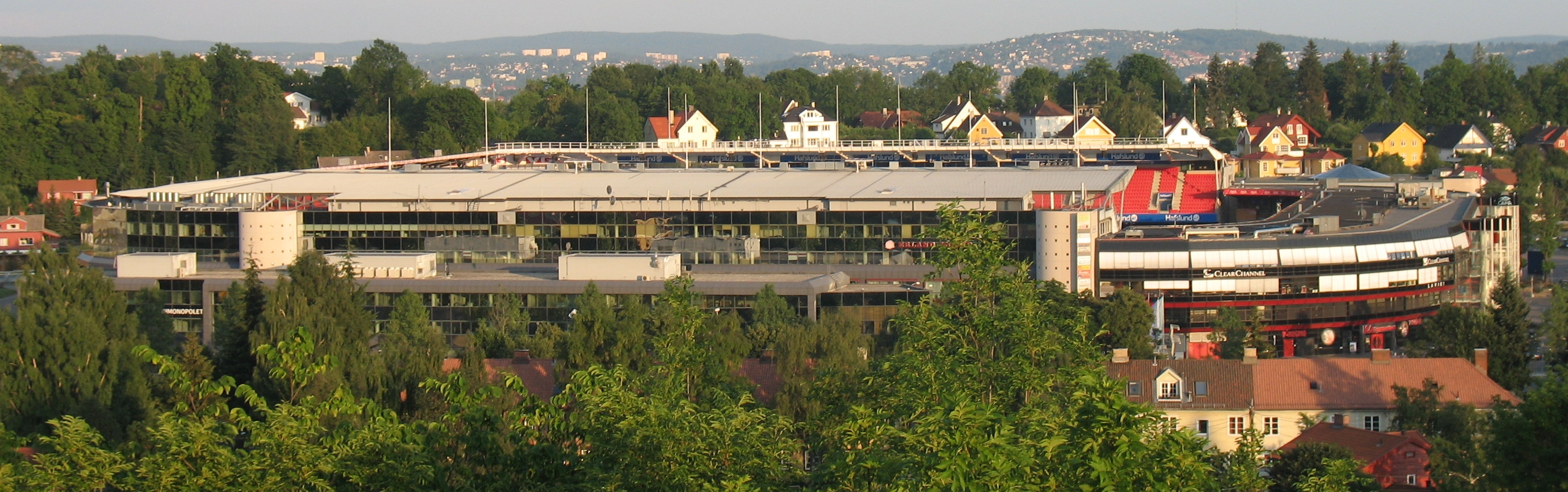
Ullevaal Stadion, Oslo - venue for the Norwegian Cup final

The 2000 Norwegian Football Cup was the 95th edition of the Norwegian Football Cup. The Cup was won by Odd Grenland after they defeated Viking in the final with the score 2–1.

Because of competing with the national team at the UEFA Euro 2000, the 14 teams from Tippeligaen were bye to the third round.

== Calendar ==
Below are the dates for each round as given by the official schedule:

Round	Date(s)	Number of fixtures	Clubs	New entries this round
First Round	23–25 May 2000	36	86 → 50	72: 15th–86th
Second Round	7–8 June 2000	18	50 → 32	none
Third Round	27–28 June 2000	16	32 → 16	14: 1st–14th
Fourth Round	19–20 July 2000	8	16 → 8	none
Quarter-finals	5–6 September 2000	4	8 → 4	none
Semi-finals	23–24 September 2000	2	4 → 2	none
Final	29 October 2000	1	2 → 1	none

== First round ==
Team 1	Score	Team 2
23 May 2000
Strømsgodset	3–1	Birkebeineren
Ørn-Horten	5–0	Sarpsborg FK
Sunndal	0–3	Træff
24 May 2000
Østsiden	2–2 (1–3 p)	Skeid
Fredrikstad	1–0	Skjetten
Sparta Sarpsborg	2–5	Lyn
Strømmen	2–3	Bærum
Grei	1–0	Asker
Ullern	1–2	Drøbak/Frogn
Kjelsås	2–0	Mercantile/Lambertseter
Sør-Aurdal	1–6	L/F Hønefoss
Kongsvinger	4–0	Lørenskog
Vardal	3–1	Elverum
Raufoss	3–2 (a.e.t.)	Gjøvik-Lyn
Larvik Turn	0–2	Eik-Tønsberg
Skarphedin	0–1	Sandefjord
Tollnes	5–1	Vindbjart
Giv Akt	0–8	Mandalskameratene
Staal	0–2	Vidar
Vard Haugesund	5–2 (a.e.t.)	Sandnes FK
Hundvåg	1–4	Randaberg
Follese	3–0	Fyllingen
Os	1–0	Gneist
Åsane	0–1 (a.e.t.)	Stord
Sogndal	1–0	Fjøra
Hødd	1–0	Skarbøvik
Tornado	1–0	Aalesund
Orkla	2–3	Levanger
Tiller	0–2	Steinkjer
Ranheim	2–4	Strindheim
Byåsen	2–0	NTNUI
Fauske/Sprint	3–3 (2–4 p)	Stålkameratene
Lofoten	8–1	Finnsnes
Skarp	1–2	Alta
Tromsdalen	7–2	Senja
25 May 2000
Lillehammer	0–1	HamKam

== Second round ==
Team 1	Score	Team 2
7 June 2000
L/F Hønefoss	0–3	HamKam
Vardal	1–2	Kongsvinger
Eik-Tønsberg	3–0	Ørn-Horten
Tollnes	1–1 (7–6 p)	Kjelsås
Sandefjord	4–1	Mandalskameratene
Randaberg	0–3	Vidar
Stord	2–1	Vard Haugesund
Follese	0–5	Sogndal
Os	1–2	Tornado
Træff	3–1	Hødd
Steinkjer	0–1	Strindheim
Levanger	0–1 (a.e.t.)	Byåsen
Stålkameratene	2–4 (a.e.t.)	Lofoten
Alta	4–2	Tromsdalen
8 June 2000
Drøbak/Frogn	0–2	Lyn
Skeid	4–0	Fredrikstad
Bærum	1–3 (a.e.t.)	Strømsgodset
Raufoss	2–0	Grei

== Third round ==
Team 1	Score	Team 2
27 June 2000
Vidar	2–0	Haugesund
28 June 2000
Moss	2–1	Raufoss
Lyn	3–0	Sandefjord
Stabæk	0–2	Træff
HamKam	2–4	Lillestrøm
Kongsvinger	0–3	Start
Strømsgodset	2–0	Skeid
Odd Grenland	6–1	Tollnes
Bryne	2–2 (3–4 p)	Eik-Tønsberg
Viking	2–1	Byåsen
Brann	2–0	Stord
Sogndal	0–7	Vålerenga
Tornado	0–5	Molde
Strindheim	1–0	Rosenborg
Lofoten	1–4	Bodø/Glimt
Tromsø	4–1	Alta

== Fourth round ==
19 July 2000
19:00 CEST (UTC+2)

Eik-Tønsberg	1–5	Bodø/Glimt
Andreassen 88'	Report	Sæternes 21', 90'; Ludvigsen 31', 45', 71'

Tønsberg Gressbane, Tønsberg
Attendance: 2,150
Referee: Ole Kamben

19 July 2000
19:00 CEST (UTC+2)

Strindheim	0–5	Odd Grenland
	Report	Borgersen 55'; Hoff 61', 68', 79'; Nilsen 85'

Lerkendal Stadion, Trondheim
Attendance: 360
Referee: Tor-Arne Fiskum

19 July 2000
19:00 CEST (UTC+2)

Træff	0–5	Viking
	Report	Tengesdal 19', 64'; Daðason 35', 90'; Berland 41'

Molde Idrettspark, Molde
Attendance: 2,514
Referee: Frode Kvam

19 July 2000
19:00 CEST (UTC+2)

Vålerenga	6–0	Vidar
E. Hagen 18'; Ødegaard 27'; Håland 48' (o.g.); Riihilahti 55'; R. Hagen 70'; Musæus 76'	Report

Ullevaal Stadion, Oslo
Attendance: 2,144
Referee: Espen Berntsen

20 July 2000
19:00 CEST (UTC+2)

Lillestrøm	3–0	Strømsgodset
Powell 55', 87'; Sundgot 82'	Report

Myhrer Stadion, Eidsvold
Attendance: 2,071
Referee: Tommy Skjerven

20 July 2000
19:00 CEST (UTC+2)

Lyn	0–3	Moss
	Report	Ramberg 8', 28', 83'

Ullevaal Stadion, Oslo
Attendance: 904
Referee: Jon Skjervold

20 July 2000
20:15 CEST (UTC+2)

Molde	3–0	Brann
Hulsker 13', 20', 66'	Report

Molde Stadion, Molde
Attendance: 7,448
Referee: Kjell Alseth

26 July 2000
19:00 CEST (UTC+2)

Start	3–2 (a.e.t.)	Tromsø
Nyan 31'; Ottosson 55'; Nordseth 111'	Report	Johansen 24', 60'

Kristiansand Stadion, Kristiansand
Attendance: 3,788
Referee: Rune Pedersen

== Quarter-finals ==
5 September 2000
17:30 CEST (UTC+2)

Bodø/Glimt	2–0	Lillestrøm
Ludvigsen 37'; Mikalsen 89'	Report

Aspmyra Stadion, Bodø
Attendance: 2,409
Referee: Per Ivar Staberg

6 September 2000
17:30 CEST (UTC+2)

Odd Grenland	2–2 (a.e.t.)	Moss
Mahlio 89'; Borgersen 111'	Report	Bergersen 90'; Tangen 115' (pen.)
Penalties
Pedersen (penalty scored); Hansen (penalty scored); Mahlio (penalty scored); Deila (penalty scored); Larsen (penalty scored); Andersen (penalty scored); Fevang (penalty scored); Aas (penalty scored); Borgersen (penalty scored)	9–8	(penalty scored) Tangen; (penalty scored) Enerly; (penalty scored) Olofsson; (penalty scored) Bergersen; (penalty scored) Juliussen; (penalty scored) Wilbraham; (penalty scored) Ophaug; (penalty scored) Ramberg; (penalty missed) Winsnes

Odd Stadion, Skien
Attendance: 5,564
Referee: Frode Kvam

6 September 2000
19:00 CEST (UTC+2)

Start	Awarded (3–4)	Molde
Ottosson 25'; Kloster 35'; Leonardsen 87'	Report	Olsen 3', 37', 62'; Rudi 55'

Kristiansand Stadion, Kristiansand
Attendance: 4,438
Referee: Kjell Alseth
1. The match was awarded to Start by NFF decision, because was Molde used an ineligible player (Martin Andresen) in original 4–3 win.

6 September 2000
19:00 CEST (UTC+2)

Viking	3–2	Vålerenga
Aarsheim 2'; Tihinen 37'; Aase 32'	Report	Rekdal 49'; Bjørkan 56'

Stavanger Stadion, Stavanger
Attendance: 4,280
Referee: Jon Skjervold

== Semi-finals ==
23 September 2000
15:15 CEST (UTC+2)

Odd Grenland	4–0	Bodø/Glimt
Larsen 7', 56'; Fevang 14', 30'	Report

Odd Stadion, Skien
Attendance: 5,564
Referee: Rune Pedersen

24 September 2000
15:15 CEST (UTC+2)

Viking	4–0	Start
Dadason 6', 69' (pen.); Berre 37'; Berland 59'	Report

Stavanger Stadion, Stavanger
Attendance: 8,940
Referee: Tom Henning Øvrebø

== Final ==
29 October 2000
13:15 CET (UTC+1)

Odd Grenland	2–1 (a.e.t.)	Viking
Tihinen 65' (o.g.); Flindt Bjerg 106'	Report	Dahl 43'

Ullevaal Stadion, Oslo
Attendance: 24,864
Referee: Frode Kvam (Strindheim)
