= 2000 Norwegian Football Cup final =

- Event: 2000 Norwegian Football Cup
Odd Grenland	Viking
2	1
- After extra time
- Date: 29 October 2000
- Venue: Ullevaal Stadion, Oslo
- Referee: Frode Kvam
- Attendance: 24,864

The 2000 Norwegian Football Cup final was the final match of the 2000 Norwegian Football Cup, the 95th season of the Norwegian Football Cup, the premier Norwegian football cup competition organized by the Football Association of Norway (NFF). The match was played on 29 October 2000 at the Ullevaal Stadion in Oslo, and opposed two Tippeligaen sides Odd Grenland and Viking. Odd Grenland defeated Viking 2–1 after extra time to claim the Norwegian Cup for a twelfth time in their history.

== Route to the final ==
Odd Grenland			Round	Viking		
Tollnes	H	6–1	Round 3	Byåsen	H	2–1
Strindheim	A	5–0	Round 4	Træff	A	5–0
Moss	H	2–2 (9–8 p)	Quarterfinal	Vålerenga	H	3–2
Bodø/Glimt	H	4–0	Semifinal	Start	H	4–0

== Match ==
=== Details ===
29 October 2000
13:15 CET (UTC+1)

Odd Grenland	2–1 (a.e.t.)	Viking
Tihinen 65' (o.g.); Flindt Bjerg 106'	Report	Dahl 43'

Ullevaal Stadion, Oslo
Attendance: 24,864
Referee: Frode Kvam (Strindheim)

Odd Grenland	Viking

Odd Grenland:
GK	1	(Norway) Erik Holtan (c)
DF	6	(Norway) Alexander Aas
DF	17	(Norway) Jan Frode Nornes		(substituted off) 46'
DF	20	(Norway) Bård Borgersen
DF	4	(Norway) Ronny Deila
MF	6	(Norway) Morten Fevang		(substituted off) 105'
MF	5	(Norway) Erik Pedersen	(yellow card) 69'
MF	18	(Finland) Sami Mahlio
FW	16	(Norway) Espen Hoff		(substituted off) 78'
FW	9	(Norway) Kim Larsen
FW	14	(Norway) Thomas Røed
Substitutions:
GK	12	(Norway) Svein Roger Dahlen
MF	7	(Denmark) Christian Flindt-Bjerg		(substituted in) 105'
FW	10	(Norway) Kristian Bye-Andersen
MF	13	(Norway) Jan Gunnar Solli
DF	23	(Norway) Brede Bomhoff
MF	29	(Norway) Tor Gunnar Johnsen		(substituted in) 78'
DF	–	(Norway) Anders Rambekk		(substituted in) 46'
Coach:
(Norway) Arne Sandstø

Viking:
GK	1	(Norway) Lars Gaute Bø
DF	3	(Norway) Bjørn Dahl
DF	4	(Finland) Hannu Tihinen	(yellow card) 69'
DF	20	(Norway) Audun Helgason
DF	5	(Norway) Thomas Pereira
MF	11	(Norway) Morten Berre	(yellow card) 93'
MF	13	(Norway) Bjørn Berland		(substituted off) 27'
MF	28	(Norway) Bjarte Lunde Aarsheim (c)
MF	7	(Norway) Erik Fuglestad
FW	10	(Norway) Erik Nevland		(substituted off) 74'
FW	17	(Iceland) Rikhardur Dadason	(yellow card) 40'
Substitutions:
GK	12	(Norway) Tore Snørteland
DF	2	(Norway) Odd Arne Espevoll
FW	9	(Norway) Gunnar Aase		(substituted in) 27'	(substituted off) 112'
DF	15	(Norway) Frode Hansen
MF	16	(Norway) Jørgen Tengesdal		(substituted in) 112'
MF	18	(Norway) Tom Sanne		(substituted in) 74'
MF	19	(Norway) Trygve Nygaard
Coach:
(Sweden) Benny Lennartsson
