= 2001 Molde FK season =

Molde
2001 season
- Chairman: Einar Sekkeseter
- Head coach: Gunder Bengtsson
- Stadium: Molde Stadion
- Tippeligaen: 5th
- Norwegian Cup: Fourth Round vs. Bryne
- Top goalscorer: League: Magne Hoseth (10); All: Magne Hoseth (14)
- Highest home attendance: 11,167 vs Rosenborg (22 July 2001)
- Lowest home attendance: 636 vs Skarbøvik (27 June 2001)
- Average home league attendance: 6,601

The 2001 season was Molde's 26th season in the top flight of Norwegian football. In Tippeligaen they finished in 5th position.

Molde participated in the Norwegian Cup. On 25 July 2001, Molde was defeated 2-3 at away ground by Bryne in the fourth round.

== Squad ==
Note: Flags indicate national team as defined under FIFA eligibility rules; some limited exceptions apply. Players may hold more than one non-FIFA nationality.

No.	Pos.	Nation	Player
1	GK	FRO	Jákup Mikkelsen
2	DF	NOR	Roger Nilsen
3	DF	NOR	Petter Christian Singsaas
4	DF	SWE	David Ljung
5	DF	NOR	Knut Anders Fostervold
6	MF	NOR	Daniel Berg Hestad (Captain)
7	MF	AUS	Ante Juric
8	MF	NOR	Karl Oskar Fjørtoft
9	FW	NOR	Bernt Hulsker
11	MF	NOR	André Schei Lindbæk
12	GK	NOR	Kenneth Bårdseng
13	GK	NOR	Knut Dørum Lillebakk
14	MF	NOR	Thomas Mork

No.	Pos.	Nation	Player
15	FW	ISL	Andri Sigthórsson
16	MF	NOR	Magne Hoseth
17	DF	NOR	Trond Strande
18	FW	NOR	Stig Arild Råket
19	MF	NOR	Anders Hasselgård
20	MF	NOR	Ardian Gashi
22	DF	SWE	Tobias Carlsson
23	FW	NOR	Kai Røberg
25	DF	NOR	Erlend Ormbostad
41	FW	NOR	Nils Gunnar Thomle
42	DF	ISL	Bjarni Þorsteinsson
—	MF	NOR	Odd Inge Olsen

As of end of season.

== Pre-season ==
=== Friendlies ===
9 February 2001	Aalesund	2 – 1	Molde	Ålesund
??:?? CET	Goal	Report	Goal	Stadium: Sunnmørshallen

15 February 2001	IFK Göteborg	0 – 1	Molde	La Manga
??:?? CET		Report	Goal

19 February 2001	Molde	2 – 1	Örgryte	La Manga
??:?? CET	Goal	Report

23 February 2001	Molde	1 – 2	Bryne	La Manga
??:?? CET	Goal	Report	Goal

6 March 2001	Molde	2 – 0	Sogndal	Hommelvik
??:?? CET	Goal	Report		Stadium: Abrahallen

9 March 2001	Molde	2 – 0	Hødd	Brattvåg
??:?? CET	Goal	Report		Stadium: Brattvåg Grusbane

15 March 2001	Molde	2 – 2	Bodø/Glimt	Fjørtoft
??:?? CET	Goal	Report	Goal

23 March 2001	Manchester United Reserves	0 – 3	Molde	Manchester
??:?? CET		Report	Goal

26 March 2001	Huddersfield	1 – 1	Molde	Huddersfield
??:?? CET	Goal	Report	Goal	Stadium: Alfred McAlpine Stadium

1 April 2001	Helsingborg	0 – 3	Molde	Helsingborg
??:?? CET		Report	Goal	Stadium: Hedens Idrottsplats

10 April 2001	Molde	4 – 0	Lillestrøm	Molde
??:?? CET	Goal	Report		Stadium: Molde Stadion

== Competitions ==
=== Tippeligaen ===
==== Results summary ====
Overall								Home						Away					
Pld	W	D	L	GF	GA	GD	Pts	W	D	L	GF	GA	GD	W	D	L	GF	GA	GD
26	13	5	8	54	41	+13	44	8	2	3	34	21	+13	5	3	5	20	20	0

Last updated: 19 April 2018.

==== Results by round ====
Round	1	2	3	4	5	6	7	8	9	10	11	12	13	14	15	16	17	18	19	20	21	22	23	24	25	26
Ground	H	A	H	A	H	A	H	A	H	A	H	A	H	A	H	A	H	A	H	A	H	A	H	A	H	A
Result	W	L	D	W	W	D	W	L	W	L	L	D	W	L	D	W	W	L	W	W	W	W	L	W	L	D
Position	1	5	7	4	3	4	3	5	3	5	7	7	7	7	7	7	7	7	7	5	5	4	4	4	4	5

Source: see below
A = Away; H = Home; W = Win; D = Draw; L = Loss

==== Results ====
16 April 2001 1	Molde	4 – 1	Bodø/Glimt	Molde
18:00 CET (UTC+1)	Rudi (yellow card) 10'; Fjørtoft (yellow card) 44'; Hestad 38', 67'; Hulsker 44'; Strande 62', (yellow card) 79'	Report	Steen (yellow card) 45'; Ludvigsen 81'	Stadium: Molde Stadion; Attendance: 6,831; Referee: Tommy Skjerven, Kaupanger

22 April 2001 2	Rosenborg	2 – 1	Molde	Trondheim
20:05 CET (UTC+1)	Trondsen (yellow card) 4'; Basma (yellow card) 5'; Winsnes 26'; Berg 52'	Report	Singsaas (yellow card) 3'; Fjørtoft (yellow card) 8', (goal) 72'; Strande (yellow card) 17'	Stadium: Lerkendal Stadion; Attendance: 10,923; Referee: Terje Hauge, Olsvik

29 April 2001 3	Molde	1 – 1	Moss	Molde
18:00 CET (UTC+1)	Hulsker (yellow card) 23'; Strande (red card) 45'; Olsen 63'; Hulsker 90'	Report	Ramberg (yellow card) 43'; Winsnes (yellow card) 56', (red card) 56'; Ødegaard 85'	Stadium: Molde Stadion; Attendance: 6,038; Referee: Kjell Alseth, Stjørdals-Blink

2 May 2001 4	Tromsø	0 – 2	Molde	Tromsø
19:00 CET (UTC+1)		Report	Hestad 44', 52'	Stadium: Alfheim Stadion; Attendance: 4,539; Referee: Jon Eilif Skjervold, Fet

6 May 2001 5	Molde	5 – 0	Bryne	Molde
18:00 CET (UTC+1)	Olsen 12', 19'; Hulsker 45', 60', 61'	Report		Stadium: Molde Stadion; Attendance: 8,375; Referee: Tommy Skjerven, Kaupanger

13 May 2001 6	Strømsgodset	1 – 1	Molde	Drammen
20:05 CET (UTC+1)	Stephansen 45', (yellow card) 82'; Holmen (yellow card) 78'	Report	Rudi 21'; Carlsson (yellow card) 36'; Singsaas (yellow card) 40'	Stadium: Marienlyst Stadion; Attendance: 14,819; Referee: Terje Hauge, Olsvik

16 May 2001 7	Molde	3 – 2	Sogndal	Molde
18:00 CET (UTC+1)	Fostervold 27'; Olsen 72', (yellow card) 86'; Rudi 74'	Report	Kalvenes 78'; Øren 84'	Stadium: Molde Stadion; Attendance: 6,143; Referee: Tom Henning Øvrebø, Nordstrand

20 May 2001 8	Odd Grenland	2 – 1	Molde	Skien
18:00 CET (UTC+1)	Hoff 2'; Rambekk 44'	Report	Hestad 90'	Stadium: Odd Stadion; Attendance: 5,778; Referee: Rune Pedersen, Sprint-Jeløy

24 May 2001 9	Molde	3 – 2	Lyn	Molde
18:00 CET (UTC+1)	Singsaas 29'; Hulsker 38'; Lindbæk 72'	Report	Ensrud (yellow card) 67'; Gudmundsson 72'; Sundgot 88'	Stadium: Molde Stadion; Attendance: 5,044; Referee: Jonny Ditlefsen, Gruben

10 June 2001 10	Lillestrøm	4 – 1	Molde	Lillestrøm
18:00 CET (UTC+1)	Werni 2'; Sundgot 10'; Powell 39', 73'; Berget (yellow card) 50'; Kihlberg (yellow card) 62'	Report	Lindbæk 56'; Hulsker (yellow card) 61', (red card) 67'; Carlsson (yellow card) 80'	Stadium: Åråsen Stadion; Attendance: 4,717; Referee: Kjell Alseth, Stjørdals-Blink

17 June 2001 11	Molde	1 – 4	Stabæk	Molde
21:00 CET (UTC+1)	Hestad 73'	Report	Wilhelmsson 11'; Kjølø (yellow card) 18'; Flem 26'; Andresen 43'; Gudmundsson 49'	Stadium: Molde Stadion; Attendance: 6,989; Referee: Espen Berntsen, Fart

22 June 2001 12	Brann	0 – 0	Molde	Bergen
19:00 CET (UTC+1)	Wassberg (yellow card) 89'	Report	Carlsson (yellow card) 84'	Stadium: Brann Stadion; Attendance: 11,459; Referee: Rune Pedersen, Sprint-Jeløy

1 July 2001 13	Molde	2 – 1	Viking	Molde
18:00 CET (UTC+1)	Mork 26'; Fjørtoft 67'	Report	Berre 6'; Kuivasto (yellow card) 67'	Stadium: Molde Stadion; Attendance: 6,115; Referee: Roy Helge Olsen, Fløy

8 July 2001 14	Bodø/Glimt	3 – 2	Molde	Bodø
18:00 CET (UTC+1)	Staurvik 1'; Johansen 32', (yellow card) 79'; Hanssen 90'	Report	Carlsson (yellow card) 34'; Fostervold (yellow card) 51'; Hoseth 52'; Hestad 80'; Olsen (yellow card) 90'	Stadium: Aspmyra Stadion; Attendance: 3,518; Referee: Jonny Ditlefsen, Gruben

22 July 2001 15	Molde	1 – 1	Rosenborg	Molde
20:00 CET (UTC+1)	Lindbæk 23'; Hestad (yellow card) 48'	Report	Hoftun 36', (yellow card) 61'; Skammelsrud (yellow card) 45'	Stadium: Molde Stadion; Attendance: 11,167; Referee: Tommy Skjerven, Kaupanger

29 July 2001 16	Moss	0 – 1	Molde	Moss
18:00 CET (UTC+1)	Wehrman (yellow card) 9'	Report	Olsen 67'	Stadium: Melløs Stadion; Attendance: 1,769; Referee: Frode Kvam, Strindheim

5 August 2001 17	Molde	4 – 3	Tromsø	Molde
18:00 CET (UTC+1)	Olsen 12', 45'; Hulsker 59'; Hoseth 71', (yellow card) 89'; Singsaas (yellow card) 72'; Hasselgård (yellow card) 81'	Report	Pedersen 31'; M'Baye 32'; De Wulf (yellow card) 58'; Hanssen 74'; Oppheim (yellow card) 82'	Stadium: Molde Stadion; Attendance: 5,147; Referee: Brage Sandmoen, Holmen

12 August 2001 18	Bryne	4 – 3	Molde	Bryne
18:00 CET (UTC+1)	Andreasson 28'; Olofsson 29'; Hjelmhaug 46', 90'; Medalen (yellow card) 85'	Report	Hoseth 3'; Fjørtoft 8'; Mork 31'	Stadium: Bryne Stadion; Attendance: 2,046; Referee: Jon Eilif Skjervold, Fet

19 August 2001 19	Molde	3 – 0	Strømsgodset	Molde
18:00 CET (UTC+1)	Hoseth 53', 82'; Fostervold (yellow card) 75'; Ljung 88'	Report	Hanssen (yellow card) 18'; Granaas (yellow card) 87'	Stadium: Molde Stadion; Attendance: 4,883; Referee: Tommy Skjerven, Kaupanger

26 August 2001 20	Sogndal	3 – 4	Molde	Sogndalsfjøra
18:00 CET (UTC+1)	Hillestad (yellow card) 32'; Sørum 37'; Kalvenes 44', (yellow card) 83'; Ystaas (yellow card) 45'; Fredriksen 87'	Report	Mork 1'; Hoseth 12', 59', 73'; Hulsker (yellow card) 84'	Stadium: Fosshaugane; Attendance: 2,575; Referee: Kjell Alseth, Stjørdals-Blink

9 September 2001 21	Molde	6 – 1	Odd Grenland	Molde
16:00 CET (UTC+1)	Hulsker 6'; Fjørtoft (yellow card) 43'; Hoseth 48'; Hestad 58', 71'; Mork 83'; Sigthorsson 89'	Report	Pedersen (yellow card) 24'; Holtan (yellow card) 26'; Larsen 52'; Flindt Bjerg (yellow card) 67'	Stadium: Molde Stadion; Attendance: 5,083; Referee: Terje Hauge, Olsvik

16 September 2001 22	Lyn	0 – 2	Molde	Oslo
16:00 CET (UTC+1)	Swift (yellow card) 12'; Hansen (yellow card) 55'	Report	Hoseth 19'; Sigthorsson (yellow card) 82'; Mork (yellow card) 85'	Stadium: Ullevaal Stadion; Attendance: 3,091; Referee: Kjell Alseth, Stjørdals-Blink

30 September 2001 23	Molde	1 – 2	Lillestrøm	Molde
16:00 CET (UTC+1)	Strande 37'; Hoseth (yellow card) 43'; Mork (yellow card) 90'	Report	Moen (yellow card) 18', (goal) 90'; Misund (yellow card) 37'; Zanetti (yellow card) 65'; Hansén (yellow card) 66'	Stadium: Molde Stadion; Attendance: 7,604; Referee: Roy Helge Olsen, Fløy

14 October 2001 24	Stabæk	0 – 1	Molde	Bærum
15:00 CET (UTC+1)	Marteinsson (yellow card) 28'; Linderoth (yellow card) 61', (red card) 90'	Report	Fostervold (yellow card) 20'; Hulsker 26', (yellow card) 28'; Fjørtoft (yellow card) 53'	Stadium: Nadderud Stadion; Attendance: 3,944; Referee: Rune Pedersen, Sprint-Jeløy

21 October 2001 25	Molde	0 – 3	Brann	Molde
18:00 CET (UTC+1)		Report	Helstad 14', 22'; Olsen 88'	Stadium: Molde Stadion; Attendance: 6,397; Referee: Tom Henning Øvrebø, Nordstrand

28 October 2001 26	Viking	1 – 1	Molde	Stavanger
13:00 CET (UTC+1)	Pereira (yellow card) 60'; Nevland 89'	Report	Sigthorsson 21'; Singsaas (yellow card) 78'	Stadium: Stavanger Stadion; Attendance: 5,610; Referee: Tommy Skjerven, Kaupanger

==== League table ====
Pos	Team	Pld	W	D	L	GF	GA	GD	Pts	Qualification or relegation
3	Viking	26	14	7	5	43	29	+14	49	Qualification for the UEFA Cup first round (Note: Since Viking qualified to the UEFA Cup first round as Norwegian Cup winners, their place in the UEFA Cup as third-placed team passed down and was awarded to Stabæk as the highest-placed team not already qualified for European competitions.)
4	Stabæk	26	14	3	9	45	39	+6	45	Qualification for the UEFA Cup qualifying round
5	Molde	26	13	5	8	54	41	+13	44	
6	Odd Grenland	26	12	6	8	50	40	+10	42	
7	Brann	26	12	5	9	63	48	+15	41	Qualification for the UEFA Cup qualifying round (Note: Brann qualified to the UEFA Cup through the UEFA Fair Play ranking award.)

Source: fotball.no
Rules for classification: 1) points; 2) goal difference; 3) number of goals scored.

=== Norwegian Cup ===
9 May 2001 First Round	Kristiansund FK	0 – 9	Molde	Kristiansund
19:00 CEST (UTC+1)	Hjelmeland (yellow card)	Report	Nilsen 2'; Lindbæk 5', 43'; Hoseth 11', 67' (pen.); Gashi 25'; Hulsker 52', 81', 89'	Stadium: KFK-banen; Attendance: 600; Referee: Modolf Holm, Isfjorden

13 June 2001 Second Round	Stryn	0 – 4	Molde	Stryn
18:00 CEST (UTC+2)		Report	Lindbæk 17', 82'; Hestad 49'; Fjørtoft 80'	Stadium: Stryn Stadion; Attendance: 1,000; Referee: Inge Seglem, Årdal

27 June 2001 Third Round	Molde	6 – 0	Skarbøvik	Molde
19:00 CEST (UTC+2)	Hoseth 5', 63'; Lindbæk 20'; Hestad 35'; Ormbostad 71'; Fjørtoft 85'	Report		Stadium: Molde Stadion; Attendance: 636; Referee: Frode Kvam, Strindheim

25 July 2001 Fourth Round	Bryne	3 – 2	Molde	Bryne
19:00 CEST (UTC+2)	Undheim 2' (red card); Pavlovic 20', 29'	Report	Lindbæk 52'; Hestad 66' (yellow card) 85'	Stadium: Bryne Stadion; Attendance: 1,228; Referee: Espen Berntsen, Fart

== Squad statistics ==
=== Appearances and goals ===
No.	Pos	Nat	Player	Total		Tippeligaen		Norwegian Cup	
No.	Pos	Nat	Player	Apps	Goals	Apps	Goals	Apps	Goals
1	GK	(Faroe Islands) FRO	Jákup Mikkelsen	11	0	10	0	1	0
2	DF	(Norway) NOR	Roger Nilsen	11	1	3+5	0	3	1
3	DF	(Norway) NOR	Petter Christian Singsaas	24	1	19+2	1	3	0
4	DF	(Sweden) SWE	David Ljung	9	1	9	1	0	0
5	DF	(Norway) NOR	Knut Anders Fostervold	23	1	21	1	2	0
6	MF	(Norway) NOR	Daniel Berg Hestad	30	12	26	9	4	3
7	MF	(Australia) AUS	Ante Juric	3	0	1+2	0	0	0
8	MF	(Norway) NOR	Karl Oskar Fjørtoft	26	5	22+1	3	3	2
9	FW	(Norway) NOR	Bernt Hulsker	26	11	17+6	8	1+2	3
11	FW	(Norway) NOR	André Schei Lindbæk	14	9	8+2	3	4	6
12	GK	(Norway) NOR	Knut Dørum Lillebakk	2	0	2	0	0	0
14	MF	(Norway) NOR	Thomas Mork	28	4	25	4	3	0
15	FW	(Iceland) ISL	Andri Sigthorsson	5	3	2+3	3	0	0
16	MF	(Norway) NOR	Magne Hoseth	27	14	18+6	10	3	4
17	DF	(Norway) NOR	Trond Strande	22	2	18+1	2	3	0
18	FW	(Norway) NOR	Stig Arild Råket	6	0	0+4	0	0+2	0
19	MF	(Norway) NOR	Anders Hasselgård	13	0	7+4	0	0+2	0
20	MF	(Norway) NOR	Ardian Gashi	6	1	0+4	0	1+1	1
22	DF	(Sweden) SWE	Tobias Carlsson	27	0	23	0	3+1	0
23	FW	(Norway) NOR	Kai Røberg	3	0	1+2	0	0	0
25	DF	(Norway) NOR	Erlend Ormbostad	20	1	12+4	0	3+1	1
41	FW	(Norway) NOR	Nils Gunnar Thomle	1	0	0+1	0	0	0
Players away from Molde on loan:
Players who left Molde during the season:
1	GK	(Norway) NOR	Morten Bakke	17	0	14	0	3	0
15	MF	(Norway) NOR	Petter Rudi	13	2	12	2	1	0
10	MF	(Norway) NOR	Odd Inge Olsen	19	7	16	7	3	0

=== Goal Scorers ===
Rank	Position	Nat.	No.	Player	Tippeligaen	Norwegian Cup	Total
1	MF	(Norway)	16	Magne Hoseth	10	4	14
2	MF	(Norway)	6	Daniel Berg Hestad	9	3	12
3	FW	(Norway)	9	Bernt Hulsker	8	3	11
4	FW	(Norway)	11	André Schei Lindbæk	3	6	9
5	MF	(Norway)	10	Odd Inge Olsen	7	0	7
6	MF	(Norway)	8	Karl Oskar Fjørtoft	3	2	5
7	MF	(Norway)	14	Thomas Mork	4	0	4
8	FW	(Iceland)	15	Andri Sigthorsson	3	0	3
9	MF	(Norway)	15	Petter Rudi	2	0	2
9	DF	(Norway)	17	Trond Strande	2	0	2
11	DF	(Norway)	3	Petter Christian Singsaas	1	0	1
11	DF	(Sweden)	4	David Ljung	1	0	1
11	DF	(Norway)	5	Knut Anders Fostervold	1	0	1
11	DF	(Norway)	2	Roger Nilsen	0	1	1
11	MF	(Norway)	20	Ardian Gashi	0	1	1
11	DF	(Norway)	25	Erlend Ormbostad	0	1	1
				TOTALS	54	21	75

== See also ==
- Molde FK seasons
