= 2001 Norwegian Football Cup =

Norgesmesterskapet i fotball for herrer

Tournament details
- Country: Norway
- Teams: 128 (main competition)

Final positions
- Champions: Viking (5th title)
- Runners-up: Bryne

Tournament statistics
- Matches played: 127
- Goals scored: 513 (4.04 per match)

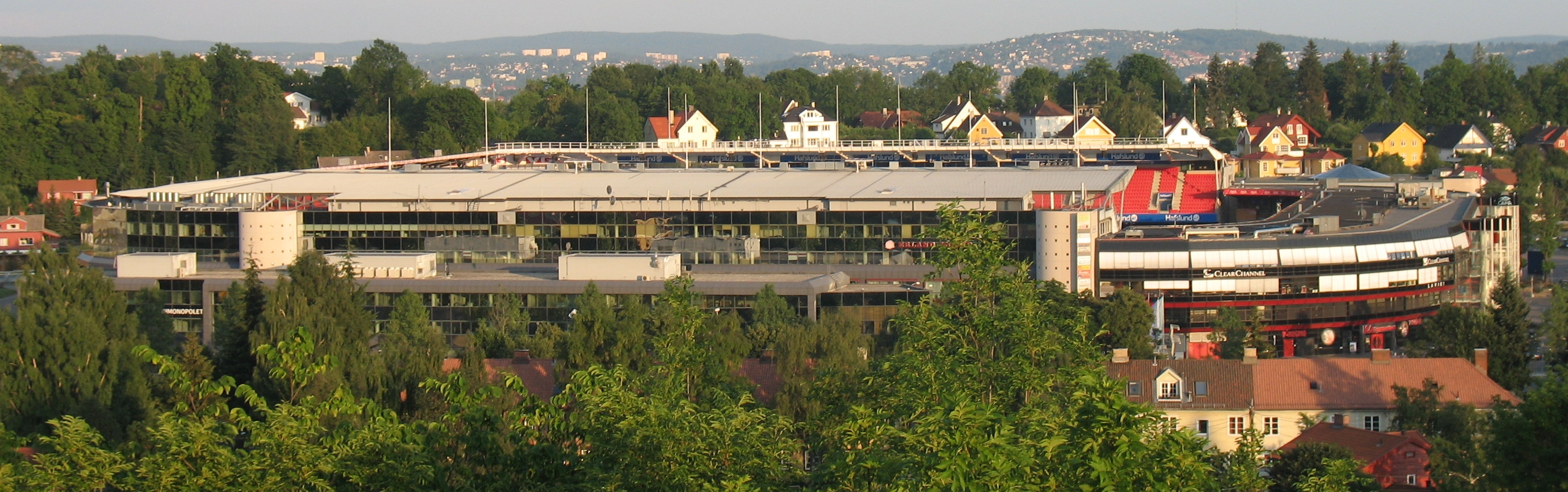
Ullevaal Stadion, Oslo - venue for the Norwegian Cup final

The 2001 Norwegian Football Cup was the 96th edition of the Norwegian Football Cup. Viking won their 5th Norwegian Championship title after defeating Bryne in the final with the score 3–0.

== Calendar ==
Below are the dates for each round as given by the official schedule:

Round	Date(s)	Number of fixtures	Clubs
First Round	8–9 May 2001	64	128 → 64
Second Round	13 June 2001	32	64 → 32
Third Round	27 June 2001	16	32 → 16
Fourth Round	25 July 2001	8	16 → 8
Quarter-finals	22 August 2001	4	8 → 4
Semi-finals	23 September 2001	2	4 → 2
Final	4 November 2001	1	2 → 1

== First round ==
Team 1	Score	Team 2
8 May 2001
Sparta Sarpsborg	0–5	Kvik Halden
Rosseland	0–3	Bryne
Stryn	3–2	Tornado
Nidelv	1–1 (2–4 p)	Ranheim
Hammerfest	2–3	Alta
9 May 2001
Navestad	0–2	Sprint-Jeløy
Østsiden	2–0	Fredrikstad
Råde	2–2 (5–6 p)	Eik-Tønsberg
Follo	2–3	Oslo Øst
Mercantile/Lambertseter	4–1	Bærum
Haugerud	1–8	Skeid
Grorud	0–6	Stabæk
Grei	1–4	Eidsvold Turn
Kjelsås	3–0	Asker
Frigg	2–5	Lyn
Romerike	3–0	Ullern
Ull/Kisa	0–3	Lørenskog
Aurskog-Finstadbru	1–2	L/F Hønefoss
Galterud	0–2	Kongsvinger
Nybergsund	2–1	Elverum
Lillehammer	1–0	Gjøvik-Lyn
HamKam	5–0	Fart
Toten	0–2	Raufoss
Sør-Aurdal	0–3	Sogndal
Åmot	1–5	Lillestrøm
Kongsberg	0–3	Strømsgodset
Ørn-Horten	4–0	Runar
Flint	0–3	Moss
Larvik Fotball	1–5	Odd Grenland
Tollnes	1–3	Pors Grenland
Urædd	0–5	Sandefjord
Herkules	0–5	Vindbjart
Start	3–0	Vigør
Lyngdal	1–2	Mandalskameratene
Staal	0–6	Viking
Vidar	6–0	Klepp
Sandnes FK	1–2 (a.e.t.)	Vard Haugesund
Haugesund	2–0	Nord
Stord	0–1	Skjold
Hovding	1–2	Nest-Sotra
Fyllingen	3–2 (a.e.t.)	Gneist
Løv-Ham	2–0	Lyngbø
Åsane	1–2	Fana
Jotun	0–4	Brann
Førde	2–0	Florø
Stranda	0–1	Skarbøvik
Aalesund	5–0	Spjelkavik
Langevåg	1–3	Hødd
Træff	1–3	Clausenengen
Kristiansund	0–9	Molde
Strindheim	6–1	Tynset
Kolstad	1–6	Byåsen
Malvik	1–7	Vålerenga
Levanger	0–4	Verdal
Steinkjer	3–0	Stjørdals-Blink
Sandnessjøen	0–7	Bodø/Glimt
Stålkameratene	1–2	Mo
Fauske/Sprint	4–1	Steigen
Narvik	2–1	Tromsdalen
Harstad	6–2	Lofoten
Fløya	0–2	Skjervøy
Ramfjord	0–8	Tromsø
Finnsnes	1–3	Skarp
Bossekop	0–11	Rosenborg

== Second round ==
Team 1	Score	Team 2
12 June 2001
Oslo Øst	3–2 (a.e.t.)	HamKam
13 June 2001
Kvik Halden	2–3	Moss
Østsiden	0–3	Lillestrøm
Sprint-Jeløy	1–2	Strømsgodset
Mercantile/Lambertseter	1–6	Odd Grenland
Lyn	1–1 (3–4 p)	Nybergsund
Lørenskog	0–4	Stabæk
Eidsvold Turn	1–2	Ørn-Horten
Raufoss	2–1 (a.e.t.)	Lillehammer
L/F Hønefoss	1–0	Strindheim
Eik-Tønsberg	0–2	Skeid
Sandefjord	2–5	Romerike
Pors Grenland	0–2	Vålerenga
Vindbjart	1–6	Viking
Mandalskameratene	1–3	Vidar
Bryne	4–3	Fyllingen
Vard Haugesund	3–5	Løv-Ham
Skjold	0–6	Brann
Nest-Sotra	4–3	Haugesund
Fana	1–3	Start
Sogndal	2–0	Clausenengen
Stryn	0–4	Molde
Skarbøvik	1–0	Kongsvinger
Rosenborg	4–0	Steinkjer
Ranheim	2–6	Hødd
Byåsen	4–2	Narvik
Mo	6–1	Fauske/Sprint
Tromsø	5–0	Skarp
Skjervøy	1–3 (a.e.t.)	Bodø/Glimt
Alta	0–1	Harstad
20 June 2001
Aalesund	1–0	Førde
Verdal	5–4 (a.e.t.)	Kjelsås

== Third round ==
Team 1	Score	Team 2
27 June 2001
Bodø/Glimt	3–0	Mo
Brann	6–1	Nest-Sotra
Harstad	0–1	Tromsø
Hødd	2–2 (4–1 p)	Rosenborg
Løv-Ham	1–3	Sogndal
Molde	6–0	Skarbøvik
Moss	3–1 (a.e.t.)	Romerike
Nybergsund	1–4	Lillestrøm
Odd Grenland	4–1	Oslo Øst
Skeid	1–2	Bryne
Stabæk	3–1	Raufoss
Start	2–0 (a.e.t.)	Aalesund
Strømsgodset	5–1	Verdal
Viking	5–0	Vidar
Vålerenga	1–0	L/F Hønefoss
Ørn-Horten	2–1	Byåsen

== Fourth round ==
18 July 2001
19:00 CEST (UTC+2)

Brann	6–0	Ørn-Horten
Lorentzen 25' (o.g.); Samuelsson 28'; Helstad 55', 57'; Furuseth 60'; Valencia 74'	Report

Brann Stadion, Bergen
Attendance: 4,130
Referee: Kjell Alseth

25 July 2001
19:00 CEST (UTC+2)

Sogndal	2–1 (a.e.t.)	Start
Bolseth 65'; Ødegaard 113'	Report	Dahlum 3'

Fosshaugane Campus, Sogndalsfjøra
Attendance: 1,843
Referee: Jon Skjervold

25 July 2001
19:00 CEST (UTC+2)

Vålerenga	2–0	Moss
Dinzey 23'; Belsvik 43'	Report

Ullevaal Stadion, Oslo
Attendance: 5,074
Referee: Tor-Arne Fiskum

25 July 2001
19:00 CEST (UTC+2)

Bryne	3–2	Molde
Undheim 2'; Pavlovic 20', 29'	Report	Lindbæk 52'; Hestad 66'

Bryne Stadion, Bryne
Attendance: 1,228
Referee: Espen Berntsen

25 July 2001
19:00 CEST (UTC+2)

Hødd	0–1	Odd Grenland
	Report	Fevang 70'

Høddvoll Stadion, Ulsteinvik
Attendance: 2,012
Referee: Brage Sandmoen

25 July 2001
19:00 CEST (UTC+2)

Tromsø	2–0	Stabæk
Essediri 8'; Schookaelt 54'	Report

Alfheim Stadion, Tromsø
Attendance: 1,719
Referee: Jonny Ditlefsen

25 July 2001
19:00 CEST (UTC+2)

Lillestrøm	5–1	Strømsgodset
Søgård 8', 27'; Zane 22', 37'; Kihlberg 31'	Report	Lindau 71'

Åråsen Stadion, Lillestrøm
Attendance: 4,240
Referee: Tom Henning Øvrebø

25 July 2001
19:00 CEST (UTC+2)

Bodø/Glimt	1–3	Viking
Sæternes 61'	Report	Aarsheim 9'; Berland 35'; Dahl 43'

Aspmyra Stadion, Bodø
Attendance: 3,895
Referee: Per Ivar Staberg

== Quarter-finals ==
1 August 2001
19:00 CEST (UTC+2)

Viking	1–0	Tromsø
Nevland 63'	Report

Stavanger Stadion, Stavanger
Attendance: 5,170
Referee: Kjell Alseth

22 August 2001
17:30 CEST (UTC+2)

Bryne	3–2	Vålerenga
Hjelmhaug 7' (pen.); Pavlovic 45'; Haraldsen 64'	Report	Hovel Heiaas 51'; Rekdal 55' (pen.)

Bryne Stadion, Bryne
Attendance: 3,029
Referee: Jon Skjervold

22 August 2001
17:30 CEST (UTC+2)

Lillestrøm	3–0	Brann
Søgård 65'; Zane 89'; Powell 90'	Report

Åråsen Stadion, Lillestrøm
Attendance: 7,462
Referee: Roy Helge Olsen

22 August 2001
17:30 CEST (UTC+2)

Odd Grenland	2–0	Sogndal
Flindt Bjerg 32'; Aas 39'	Report

Odd Stadion, Skien
Attendance: 4,012
Referee: Espen Berntsen

== Semi-finals ==
23 September 2001
14:00 CEST (UTC+2)

Bryne	4–0	Lillestrøm
Gallo 12'; Pavlovic 76'; Olofsson 82'; Giske 89'	Report

Bryne Stadion, Bryne
Attendance: 3,998
Referee: Rune Pedersen

23 September 2001
19:00 CEST (UTC+2)

Viking	2–1	Odd Grenland
Berre 6'; Tengesdal 89'	Report	Fevang 54'

Stavanger Stadion, Stavanger
Attendance: 8,545
Referee: Tom Henning Øvrebø

== Final ==
4 November 2001
13:15 CET (UTC+1)

Bryne	0–3	Viking
	Report	Eskeland 5' (o.g.); Berre 56'; Tihinen 71'

Ullevaal Stadion, Oslo
Attendance: 25,823
Referee: Kjell Alseth (Stjørdals/Blink)
