= Håvard Ottesen =

Norwegian footballer (born 1977)

Personal information
- Full name: Håvard Østman Ottesen
- Date of birth: 30 March 1977 (age 49)
- Position: Midfielder

Youth career
- –1991: Kroken
- 1992: Tromsdalen

Senior career*
Years	Team	Apps	(Gls)
1993–2004	Tromsdalen		
2001	→ Lillestrøm (loan)	2	(0)

International career
1992	Norway u-16	10	(0)
1993	Norway u-17	2	(1)
1994	Norway u-18	4	(0)
1995	Norway u-19	1	(0)
- * Club domestic league appearances and goals

Håvard Ottesen (born 30 March 1977) is a retired Norwegian football midfielder.

Hailing from Krokelvdalen, Ottesen went from local team Kroken to Tromsdalen UIL in 1992 and played first-team football from 1993. He also represented Norway as a youth international.

In late August 2001 he signed for Lillestrøm SK on loan for the rest of the 2001 season. He got two Eliteserien games and one cup game. Returning to Tromsdalen, he played throughout the 2004 season.
