= Bomhoff =

Bomhoff is a surname. Notable people with the surname include:

- Eduard Bomhoff (born 1944), Dutch economist and academic
- Brede Bomhoff (born 1976), Norwegian footballer
