= Sami Mahlio =

Finnish footballer (born 1972)

Personal information
- Date of birth: 12 January 1972 (age 54)
- Place of birth: Valkeakoski, Finland
- Position: Midfielder

Senior career*
Years	Team	Apps	(Gls)
1988–1990	VaKP	63	(15)
1991–1994	Haka	74	(3)
1994	→ VaKP (loan)	8	(3)
1995–1998	MYPA	92	(13)
1999–2002	Odd Grenland	65	(3)
2003	Sandefjord	16	(0)
2004–2005	Pors	20	(2)
2005	Lahti	13	(0)
2006–2007	Tollnes	43	(0)
Total		394	(39)

International career
1995–2001	Finland	25	(0)
- * Club domestic league appearances and goals

Sami Mahlio (born 12 January 1972) is a Finnish former professional footballer who played as a midfielder.

== Club career ==
Mahlio played for VaKP, FC Haka and MYPA in his domestic Finland, before joining Norwegian club Odd Grenland in 1999, where he made his Tippeligaen debut on 13 May 1999, when he came off the bench for Frode Johnsen in a 5–0 defeat at Tromsø. He was a starter in the 2000 Norwegian Football Cup Final, which Odd won over Viking.

In 2003, he moved to Sandefjord, competing in the Norwegian First Division. He made his debut for the team on 13 April, coming on as a substitute for Geir Ludvig Fevang in a 2–0 win over Ørn Horten. The following year he moved to Pors, for whom he played his first match on 12 April 2004, when he was a starter in a 4–0 defeat at home to Start.

After his stint in Norway, Mahlio returned to his native Finland to play for Lahti. In 2006 he returned to Norway, to end his career with Tollnes.

== International career ==
Mahlio made 25 appearances for Finland between 1995 and 2001.

== Honours ==
MYPA

- Finnish Cup: 1995

Odd Grenland

- Norwegian Football Cup: 2000
