= Peter Lindau =

Swedish footballer and manager

Personal information
- Date of birth: 9 December 1972 (age 53)
- Position: Midfielder

Senior career*
Years	Team	Apps	(Gls)
- Halmstad
1994	Lund		
1995–1999	Halmia		
1999–2000	Ayr United	16	(0)
1999–2000	→ Partick Thistle (loan)	9	(4)
2000–2001	Partick Thistle	31	(9)
2001–2004	Strømsgodset		
2005–2007	Kongsvinger	67	(12)

Managerial career
- 2008–present: Astrio
- * Club domestic league appearances and goals

Peter Lindau (born 9 December 1972) is a Swedish retired football midfielder.

He started his career in Halmstads BK, and joined Lunds BK in 1994. He broke his leg and only got three matches, but joined IS Halmia the next year. He joined Ayr United in August 1999, and remained with them until August 2000. In between he spent time on loan at Partick Thistle from December 1999 to March 2000. In August 2000 he joined Partick Thistle permanently, leaving them in June 2001. He then joined Strømsgodset IF, and played eleven Norwegian Premier League game in 2001, scoring four goals. Strømsgodset were relegated, but Lindau stayed there until after the 2004 season. He was rumored to transfer to IF Birkebeineren, Mjøndalen IF or Hønefoss BK, but chose Kongsvinger IL. He scored 12 goals in 67 games over three seasons.

Ahead of the 2008 season he became head coach of IS Halmia.
