= Jørgen Tengesdal =

Norwegian footballer and coach (born 1979)

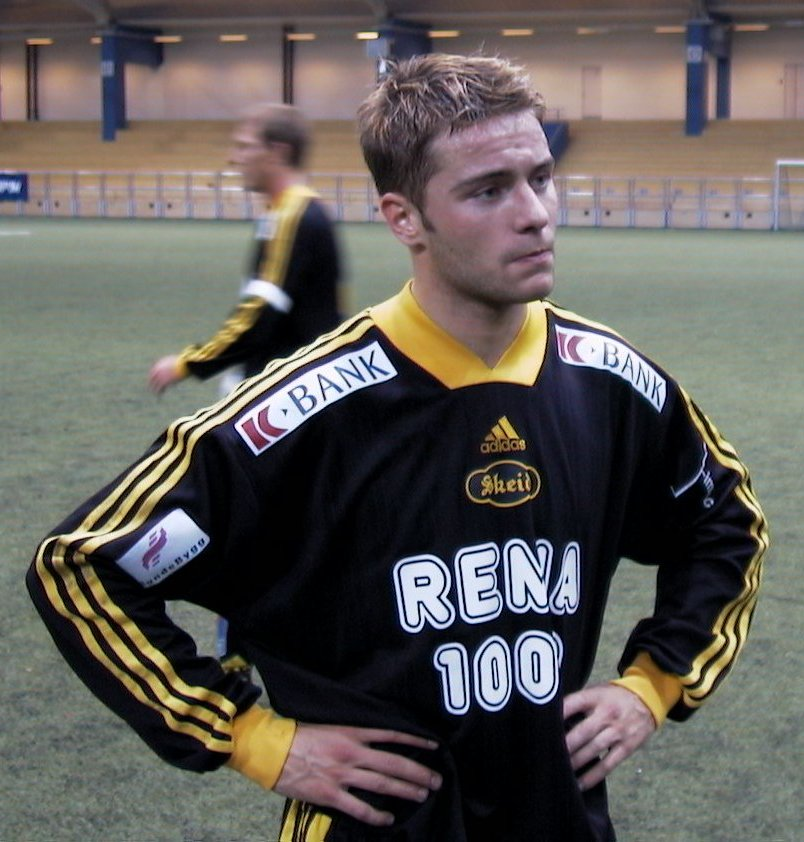

Personal information
- Date of birth: 5 April 1979 (age 47)
- Place of birth: Stavanger, Norway
- Height: 1.80 m (5 ft 11 in)
- Position: Defender

Youth career
- –1997: Egersund

Senior career*
Years	Team	Apps	(Gls)
1998–2001	Viking	25	(1)
2001	→ Tromsø (loan)	5	(2)
2002	Skeid	7	(0)
2002	Lyn	11	(3)
2003–2007	Viking	69	(1)
2008	Randaberg		

International career
1997	Norway U17	7	(0)
2000–2001	Norway U21	5	(0)

Managerial career
- 2009: Randaberg
- 2011–2013: Egersund (assistant)
- * Club domestic league appearances and goals

Jørgen Tengesdal (born 5 April 1979) is a Norwegian former professional footballer who later worked as coach.

Tengesdal played for Viking most of his career, but also spent time at Tromsø, Skeid, Lyn and Randaberg. He represented Norway at under-17 and under-21 level.

Tengesdal was head coach of Randaberg after he retired, and later worked in Egersund's coaching staff.

== Club career ==
Tengesdal was born in Stavanger, and grew up in Egersund where he played for Egersund until 1997 and joined Viking ahead of the 1998 season. He played 18 league-matches in his three first season at Viking, and replaced Gunnar Aase as a substitute after 111 minutes in the 2000 Norwegian Football Cup Final when Viking lost 2–1 against Odd Grenland.

In the 2001 season, Tengesdal spent six weeks at Tromsø on loan during the summer. He scored two goals in his first match for Tromsø when Sogndal was beaten 3–0 on 10 June 2001. Tengesdal played five league-games and two cup-games for Tromsø before he returned to Viking. Tengesdal scored the goal that sent Viking to the 2001 Norwegian Football Cup Final in the last minute of the semi-final against Odd Grenland, and a few days later he was involved in both of Viking's goals when Kilmarnock was eliminated from the 2001–02 UEFA Cup. Tengesdal's contract expired on 30 October 2001, five days before the final, and Viking's head coach Benny Lennartsson did not want to sign Tengesdal for another season. Tengesdal played in the Final when the local rivals Bryne were beaten 3–0, after Viking extended his contract by a week.

Tengesdal joined First Division side Skeid as a free agent ahead of the 2002 season, and scored on his debut for the club when Hønefoss was beaten 2–1 on 21 April 2004. In June 2002, Skeid released their best-paid players, Patrick Holtet, Børge Hernes and Tengesdal, due to the financial difficulties. Tengesdal then signed a contract lasting until the end of the season with Lyn, where he made his debut against Pors Grenland on 27 June 2012. He played seven league-matches and one cup match for Lyn, all as a substitute.

Tengesdal signed for Viking ahead of the 2003 season, one year after he left the club. Under Roy Hodgson's command, Tengesdal was playing regularly on the right back and received praise for his performances, and also played for Viking in the 2005–06 UEFA Cup. After he retired, Tengesdal said he was at his best during the time with Hodgson as manager.

While playing for Randaberg in 2008, Tengesdal got an offer from the First Division side FK Haugesund, which he turned down. He played one season in Randaberg before he retired because of problems with a hip. Tengesdal was diagnosed with osteoarthritis, and replaced both his hips at the age of 33. By that time, virtually all the cartilage in his hip socket had disappeared, which meant that there was no shock absorption between the hip bone and the hip socket and bone against bone in every movement caused him excruciating pain. Two weeks after the surgery, he threw away his crutches.

== International career ==
Tengesdal played five matches for Norway U17 in 1997, and seven matches for Norway U21 between 2000 and 2001.

== Coaching career ==
Tengesdal was the manager of Randaberg alongside Bjarte Lunde Aarsheim in 2009. He joined the coaching staff of his childhood club Egersund ahead of the 2011 season. He left the position as assistant to Bengt Sæternes in 2013 to become an adviser in FK Vidar.
