= Bjørn Stephansen =

Norwegian footballer (born 1974)

Personal information
- Full name: Bjørn Fredrik Stephansen
- Date of birth: 6 February 1974 (age 52)
- Position: Defender

Senior career*
Years	Team	Apps	(Gls)
–1993	Randesund		
1994–2000	Start		
1996	→ Ullern (loan)		
2001–2002	Strømsgodset	35	(1)
2003–2005	Bærum		
2004	→ Follo (loan)		
2006–2007	Flekkerøy		

Managerial career
- 2006–2007: Flekkerøy (assistant)
- * Club domestic league appearances and goals

Bjørn Fredrik Stephansen (born 6 February 1974) is a former Norwegian association football defender.

He began his career at Randesund IL before joining city rivals IK Start in 1994. After making only occasional appearances, he was loaned to second-tier club Ullern IF in 1996. From 1997 he established himself as a regular for Start, before relocating eastwards in 2000 to represent Strømsgodset for two seasons and subsequently Bærum for three seasons, which included a loan spell at Follo. In 2006 and 2007, he also served as assistant manager at his hometown club, Flekkerøy IL.
