= Knut Hovel Heiaas =

Norwegian footballer (born 1977)

Personal information
- Date of birth: 21 April 1977 (age 49)
- Place of birth: Enebakk, Norway
- Height: 1.81 m (5 ft 11 1/2 in)
- Position: Striker

Team information
- Current team: Strømmen
- Number: 11

Youth career
- Enebakk IF

Senior career*
Years	Team	Apps	(Gls)
1995–1999	Strømmen		
2000–2002	Vålerenga	38	(8)
2003–2004	Hønefoss	27	(7)
2005–2006	Moss	30	(1)
2006	→ Hødd (loan)	17	(4)
2007–2008	Drøbak/Frogn	7	
2009	Strømmen		
2010–2011	Nesodden	3	
2014-2017	Driv	30	(30)
2021	Enebakk	1	(1)
2024	FK Union Carl Berner	1	(1)
- * Club domestic league appearances and goals

Knut Hovel Heiaas (born 21 April 1977) is a retired Norwegian football striker, who was known for his speed on the first 20 meters.

He hails from Dalefjerdingen. His first senior club was Strømmen, where he played from 1995 to 1999. Ahead of the 2000 season he joined Vålerenga IF, where he got five Norwegian Premier League games in 2000 and fourteen in 2002. After the 2002 season he joined Hønefoss BK. At the same time he rejected Moss FK, but he joined this club two years later. In late 2006 he spent time on loan at IL Hødd, and ahead of the 2007 season he moved permanently to Drøbak/Frogn IL. In 2009, he returned to his old club Strømmen. After the season, he went on to Nesodden IF.

== Norwegian Goal-Scoring Record ==
Heiaas is the only player to have scored in all divisions of the Norwegian Football League after his goal for FK Union Carl Berner May 31, 2024.

The feat will be commemorated at the Norwegian National Arena, Ullevål Stadion on October 10, 2024, by the Norwegian Football Federation.
