= Kristian Bye-Andersen =

Norwegian footballer (born 1975)

Personal information
- Date of birth: 26 September 1975 (age 51)
- Height: 1.83 m (6 ft 0 in)
- Position: Striker

Youth career
- Liungen
- 1993: Mjøndalen

Senior career*
Years	Team	Apps	(Gls)
–1992	Liungen		
1994–1996	Liungen		
1997–1999	Eik-Tønsberg	60	(18)
2000–2002	Odd	15	(1)
2001	→ Ørn-Horten (loan)	13	(2)
2003–2004	Tollnes		
2007	Skotfoss		
2008–2011	Liungen		
2012–2013	Spa/Bra/Stoppen		
- * Club domestic league appearances and goals

Kristian Bye-Andersen (born 26 September 1975) is a retired Norwegian football striker.

A very prolific goalscorer in sixth-tier Liungen IF, he was picked up by Mjøndalen IF in 1993 where he played junior football. He was not offered a senior contract and returned to Liungen, now on the fifth tier. In 1995 he scored about 50 league goals.

Chased by a number of clubs, in 1997 he signed for second-tier Eik-Tønsberg. Following 13 goals in the 1999 1. divisjon he was signed by first-tier club Odd. Following a loan to Ørn-Horten and little playing time in Odd in 2001 and 2002, he continued two years in Tollnes before retiring.

He came out of retirement to play for Skotfoss in 2007, then rejoined Liungen. He finished his career in Sparta/Bragerøen which changed its name to Stoppen.
