= Jan Tore Ophaug =

Norwegian footballer (born 1977)

Personal information
- Date of birth: 25 March 1977 (age 49)
- Place of birth: Orkanger, Norway
- Height: 1.89 m (6 ft 2 1/2 in)
- Position: Defender

Senior career*
Years	Team	Apps	(Gls)
1993–1997	Orkanger IF		
1998–2002	Moss FK	107	(6)
2003–2004	SK Brann	46	(1)
2004–2008	OB	72	(1)
2008–2011	Fredrikstad FK	66	(1)

Managerial career
- 2020–: Råde IL
- * Club domestic league appearances and goals

Jan Tore Ophaug (born 25 March 1977) is a Norwegian former footballer.

In 2020 he became the manager of Råde IL.

== Honours ==
OB

- Danish Cup: 2006–07
