= Jan Frode Nornes =

Norwegian footballer (born 1973)

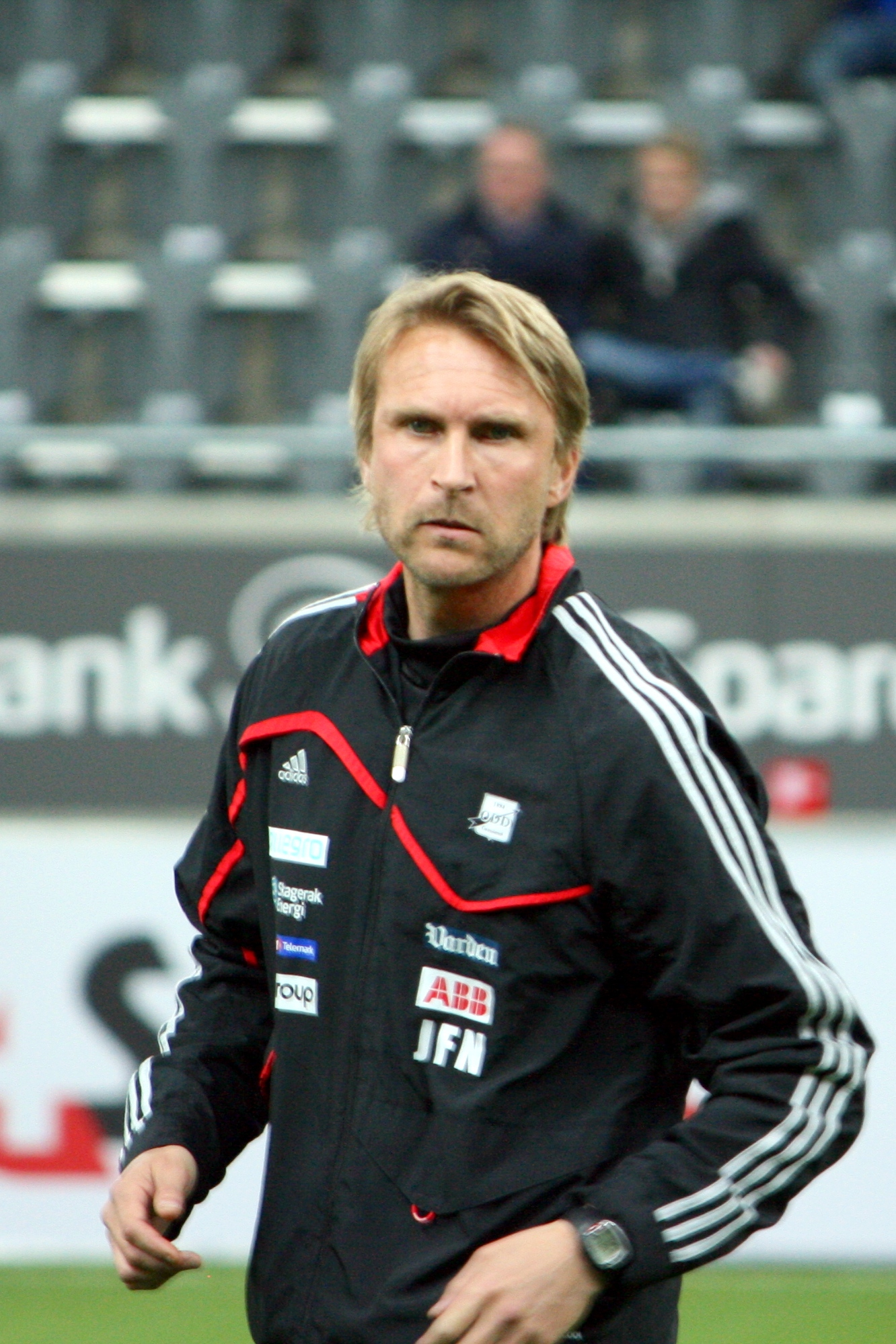
- Nornes, 2009

Personal information
- Date of birth: 8 January 1973 (age 53)
- Place of birth: Tønsberg, Norway
- Height: 1.87 m (6 ft 2 in)
- Position: Centre-back

Youth career
- Flint

Senior career*
Years	Team	Apps	(Gls)
- Flint
–1998	Eik-Tønsberg		
1999–2006	Odd Grenland	175	(4)
2006	→ Strømsgodset (loan)	9	(0)
2007–2008	Sandefjord	10	(0)

International career
2000–2003	Norway	2	(0)

Managerial career
- 2008–2020: Odd (assistant)
- 2020: Odd (interim)
- 2020–2021: Odd
- 2023–2024: Vålerenga (assistant)
- 2023: Vålerenga (interim)
- * Club domestic league appearances and goals

Jan Frode Nornes (born 8 January 1973) is a Norwegian football coach and former player.

== Career ==
Nornes played most of his career with Odd Grenland whom he joined in 1999, but after a shoulder injury, he was loaned out to 1. divisjon club Strømsgodset autumn 2006. He helped Strømsgodset to promotion to Tippeligaen, and was offered a permanent contract with the team from Drammen, but chose to return home to Vestfold, and Sandefjord.

He previously played for Flint and Eik, in his hometown Tønsberg.

Nornes was capped three times for Norway.

After his retirement as a player, Nornes worked as an assistant coach at his former club Odd. He was the assistant coach of Dag-Eilev Fagermo for 12 years, before Fagermo left the club for Vålerenga in January 2020. Nornes was then promoted to head coach of Odd in March 2020. He was sacked on 8 January 2022. Ahead of the 2023 he was named as assistant manager of Vålerenga, working under his old superior Dag-Eilev Fagermo.
