= Dejan Pavlovic =

Swedish footballer

Personal information
- Date of birth: 23 January 1971 (age 55)
- Place of birth: Helsingborg, Sweden
- Height: 1.93 m (6 ft 4 in)
- Position: Forward

Youth career
- Helsingborgs IF

Senior career*
Years	Team	Apps	(Gls)
1991–1992	Helsingborgs IF		
1993–1996	Högaborgs BK		
1997–1999	Malmö FF	65	(16)
1999–2000	Kavala	17	(7)
2000–2001	Anorthosis FC		
2001–2003	Bryne FK	62	(20)
2004	Landskrona BoIS	2	(0)
2004	Högaborgs BK		
- * Club domestic league appearances and goals

Dejan Pavlovic (born 23 January 1971) is a Swedish former footballer.

He is of Croatian descent. Sporting long hair and a beard, he has been called a "cult hero" in the Norwegian club Bryne FK.
