= Brede Bomhoff =

Norwegian footballer (born 1976)

Personal information
- Date of birth: July 30, 1976 (age 50)
- Place of birth: Skien, Norway
- Height: 1.87 m (6 ft 2 in)
- Position: Defender

Senior career*
Years	Team	Apps	(Gls)
1999	Tollnes BK	?	(?)
2000–2005	Odd Grenland	45	(0)
2005–????	Tollnes BK	?	(?)
- * Club domestic league appearances and goals as of 27 May 2009

Brede Bomhoff (born 30 July 1976) is a retired Norwegian football defender.
