= Ronny Deila =

Norwegian footballer and manager (born 1975)

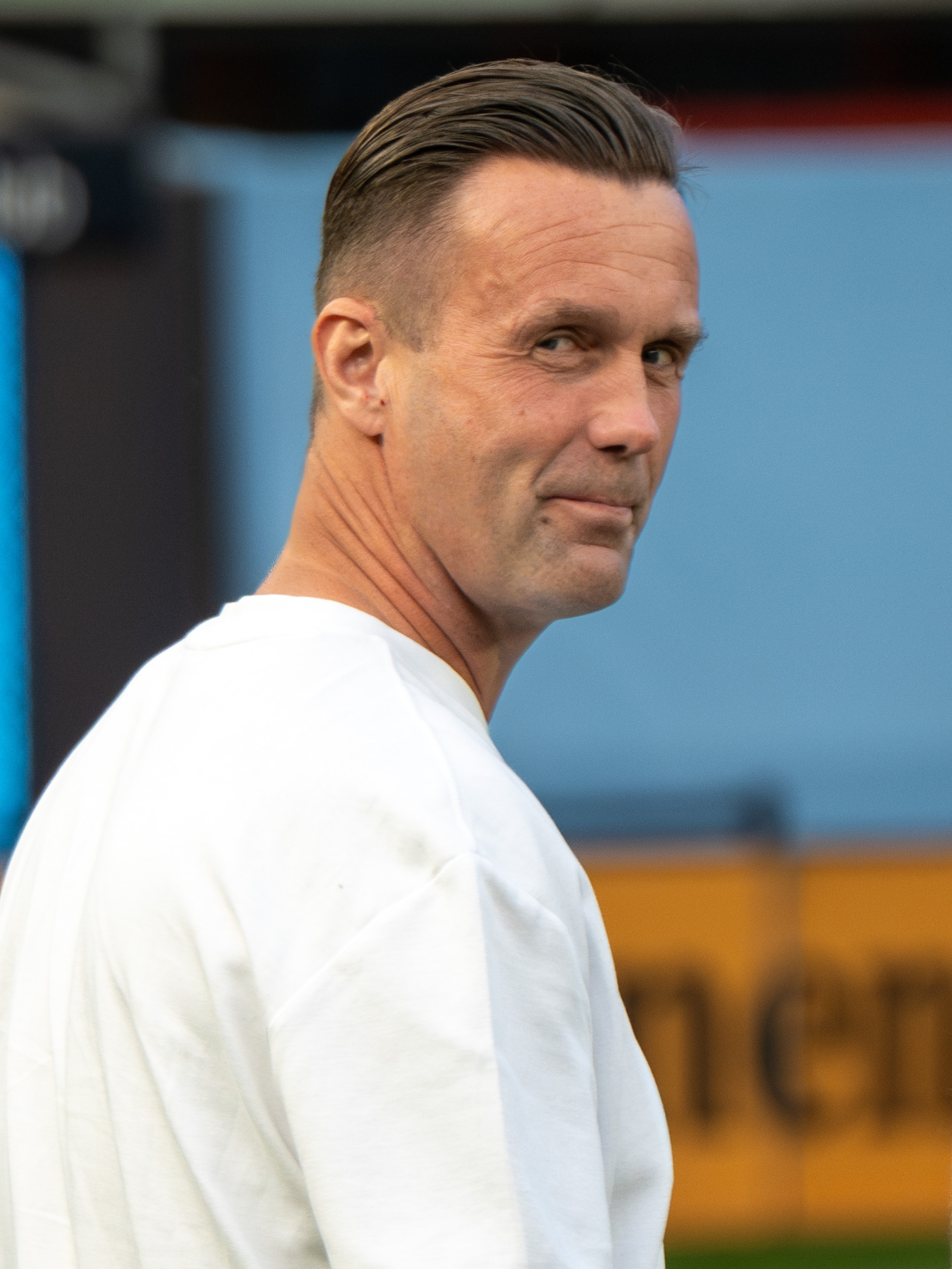
- Deila in 2025

Personal information
- Full name: Ronny Deila
- Date of birth: 21 September 1975 (age 51)
- Place of birth: Porsgrunn, Norway
- Height: 1.88 m (6 ft 2 in)
- Position: Centre-back

Youth career
- Urædd

Senior career*
Years	Team	Apps	(Gls)
1992–1993	Urædd	16	(0)
1993–2004	Odd	240	(22)
2004–2005	Viking	23	(0)
2006–2008	Strømsgodset	43	(6)
2009–2011	Sparta Bragerøen	30	(4)
Total		352	(32)

International career
1992–1993	Norway U17	9	(0)
1994	Norway U18	3	(0)
1996	Norway U21	2	(0)

Managerial career
- 2005: Brodd
- 2008–2014: Strømsgodset
- 2014–2016: Celtic
- 2017–2020: Vålerenga
- 2020–2022: New York City
- 2022–2023: Standard Liège
- 2023–2024: Club Brugge
- 2024: Al Wahda
- 2024–2025: Atlanta United
- 2026: Maccabi Tel Aviv
- * Club domestic league appearances and goals

Ronny Deila (born 21 September 1975) is a Norwegian football manager and former player, who was the head coach of Israeli Premier League club Maccabi Tel Aviv until May 2026.

He spent most of his playing career at Odd before becoming head coach at Strømsgodset, winning the Norwegian Cup in 2010 and the Norwegian League title in 2013. In two seasons managing Celtic, in 2014–15 and 2015–16, he won the Scottish Premiership twice and the Scottish League Cup in 2014–15. Deila won the MLS Cup 2021 with New York City.

== Playing career ==
Deila began his playing career with lower league club, Urædd. He then joined Odd, where he became a mainstay in their defence. In 2000, he played in the side that defeated Viking 2–1 in the Norwegian Cup Final, his only major honour as a player. He joined Viking in 2004, before moving on to join Strømsgodset as player/assistant coach in 2006.

Although by 2009 he was coaching Strømsgodset, he combined these duties for a couple of years with playing part-time at lower league Sparta Bragerøen until 2011.

He was capped nine times for the Norwegian under-17 side and then made two appearances for the under-21s in 1996. Deila never represented his country at senior level.

== Coaching and management ==
=== Strømsgodset ===
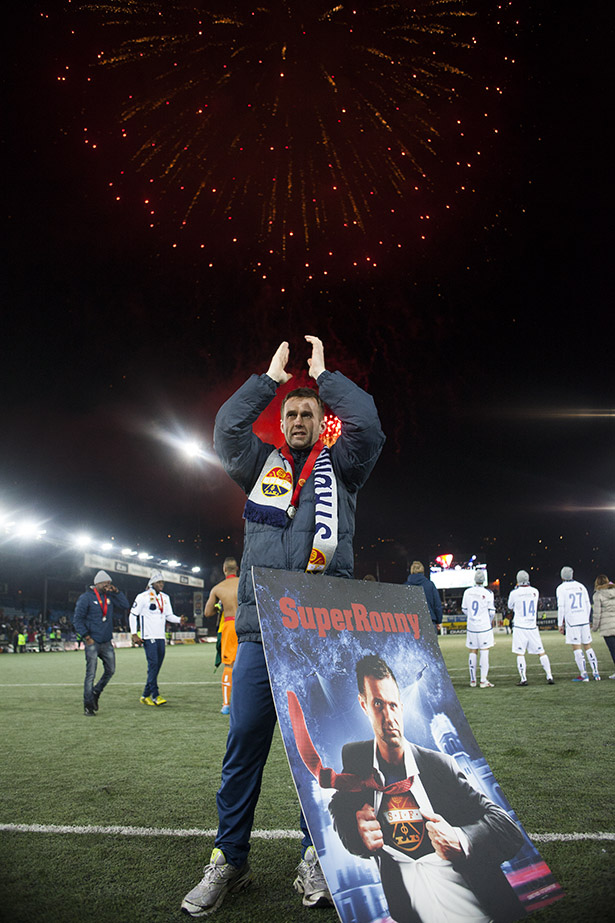
Deila as manager of Strømsgodset in 2012

After leaving Viking, Deila coached Norwegian fourth-tier club Brodd briefly in 2005. He then joined Strømsgodset in 2006 as player/assistant coach, working under head coach Dag-Eilev Fagermo until the end of the 2007 season, when Fagermo decided to move to Odd.

Sporting director Jostein Flo then promoted Deila to head coach of Strømsgodset. At this time, Deila retired as a player.

His first two seasons as head coach saw the club struggle against relegation, but his attacking philosophy began to bear fruit as Strømsgodset started to record higher finishes in the Norwegian league. In 2010, he won the Norwegian Cup, and in 2013 he won Tippeligaen with Strømsgodset, their first title in 43 years. The same year, Deila was also awarded the Kniksen Award for Coach of the Year.

Deila showed a keenness to take on board coaching ideas at foreign clubs. Having previously visited Manchester City, Barcelona and Ajax to acquire further knowledge, he then after the end of the season in 2013 travelled to Borussia Dortmund and Liverpool to study their coaching and training methods.

In the 2014 season, Deila's Strømsgodset were second in the league by the end of May after eleven games. The club had continued their impressive home record under Deila, having gone 44 league games unbeaten at their Marienlyst Stadium since June 2011; just one short of the all-time Norwegian record held by Rosenborg. However, Deila was beginning to attract foreign attention, and Strømsgodset had given him a new contract to run until 2016 in order to head off interest from Swedish champions Malmö who had unsuccessfully attempted to poach him in January. Despite this new contract, various media reports surfaced in the first week of June linking Deila to the vacant managerial post at Scottish champions Celtic.

=== Celtic ===
Deila was appointed manager of Scottish Premiership club Celtic on 6 June 2014. He signed a 12-month rolling contract with the club, describing his appointment as a "magnificent honour" before stating his desire to deliver "attacking, exciting and entertaining football." Eleven days later, former Celtic and Scotland midfielder John Collins was appointed assistant manager. Deila described Collins as a "first-class coach" and stated that he "has ideas on football which are very similar to mine so I am sure he will be a great addition to my team."

After going unbeaten on a pre-season tour in Austria, Deila's first competitive match as manager of Celtic, a Champions League qualifying tie away against KR Reykjavik on 15 July 2014, ended in a 1–0 win for the Scottish club. The second leg of the tie ended in a 4–0 win for Celtic, securing a 5–0 aggregate win. The following qualifying round saw Celtic lose 6–1 on aggregate to Legia Warsaw. Despite this, Celtic were given a reprieve when it was discovered that Legia had fielded an ineligible player in the second leg. UEFA punished the Polish club by awarding the game 3–0 to Celtic, levelling the aggregate score at 4–4 and seeing the Scottish champions progress on away goals. Celtic went on to face Maribor in the next qualifying round. After an 1–1 draw away in the first leg, Celtic lost 1–0 in the return match at Celtic Park and went out on aggregate; dropping down to the Europa League.

On 13 August, Deila won his opening Scottish Premiership game, beating St Johnstone 3–0. Deila's second league match, and his first game at Parkhead, saw Celtic defeat Dundee United 6–1 in a performance that BBC Sport described as being "full of drive, skill, belief and… goals." Generally though, Celtic were unconvincing in the early stages of the league, but improved as the season progressed and also qualified from their Europa League group. These improved performances saw Deila win the Manager of the Month award for November 2014. By February 2015, Celtic had won 15 of their last 17 domestic games and defeated Rangers 2–0 in the semi-final of the Scottish League Cup. Celtic played Inter Milan in the last 32 stage of the Europa League, rallying to draw 3–3 at Parkhead from an early 0–2 deficit, then losing 1–0 in Milan to go out on aggregate 3–4. In the league, Celtic beat second placed Aberdeen 4–0 on 1 March to go six points clear with a game in hand and a vastly superior goal difference. It was Celtic's eighth consecutive win in the league.

On 15 March 2015, Deila won his first trophy at Celtic, with the club defeating Dundee United 2–0 in the League Cup Final. Kris Commons and James Forrest were Celtic's goalscorers, whilst Stefan Johansen won the Man of the Match award.

Deila's Celtic team won the Scottish Premiership on 2 May 2015, with three games to spare, following their rivals Aberdeen's loss to Dundee United. Celtic finished the season in style, with the club defeating Inverness 5–0 on 24 May 2015.

In August 2015, Celtic failed to progress from the UEFA Champions League playoffs, having failed to overcome Malmö, and were consigned to playing in the Europa League that season. In November, Celtic exited the Europa league, having finished bottom of their group. On 17 April 2016 Celtic played Rangers, in a Scottish Cup semi-final at Hampden. The match went to extra time before Celtic lost the match on penalties. The way in which Celtic lost the match was also subject to criticism from the media and the Celtic support as Rangers dominated large portions of the game. Three days after the defeat and following intense speculation, Deila announced that he would step down at the end of the season. Celtic clinched the Scottish Premiership title following a win over nearest challengers Aberdeen on 8 May 2016.

=== Vålerenga ===
On 13 July 2016, Deila signed a four-year contract with Vålerenga, starting 1 January 2017. Vålerenga spent most of Deila's first season struggling just above the relegation places in the league. His predecessor, Kjetil Rekdal, described the team's season as a "failure" and expressed concern they may be relegated. Football analyst and former player Bernt Hulsker described the team as being "exceptionally weak". The side eventually finished mid-table, in eighth place, still far below Deila's expressed aim at the start of the season of a top-three place.

Vålerenga continued to perform poorly into Deila's second season, and a run of only one win in seven games saw them languishing in eighth place at the end of October 2018. Deila admitted to considering his position at the club, stating "I am going to take time and reflect on this. Something has gone very wrong". A 2–1 win over Ranheim on the last day of the season saw Vålerenga finish in sixth place.

=== New York City FC ===
On 6 January 2020, Deila was appointed head coach of New York City of Major League Soccer on a three-year deal. He made his debut on 21 February in the last 16 first leg of the CONCACAF Champions League away to San Carlos in Costa Rica, a 5–3 win. The team finished the season by qualifying for the MLS Cup Playoffs, and lost on penalties in the first round at Orlando City.

Under Deila's guidance, NYCFC won MLS Cup 2021, as they defeated Portland Timbers in the final match with a 4–2 win on penalties, after a 1–1 scoreline in extra time.

=== Standard Liège ===
On 13 June 2022, Deila was officially appointed as the head coach of Belgian Pro League club Standard Liège. In his first game on 22 July, the team scored a late equaliser to draw 2–2 at home to Gent, having been down to ten men since the 15th-minute dismissal of Alexandro Calut.

=== Club Brugge ===
On 25 May 2023, Deila was announced as the new head coach of club Club Brugge. In August, he led them to defeat Osasuna 4–3 on aggregate to reach the UEFA Conference League group stage. The club announced his departure on 18 March 2024 ahead of the Champions' play-offs in the 2023–24 league season, despite reaching the quarter-finals in the Conference League.

=== Atlanta United ===
On 20 December 2024, Deila was named head coach of Major League Soccer club Atlanta United. On 19 October 2025, Delia was dismissed as Atlanta's head coach.

=== Maccabi Tel-Aviv ===
In January 2026, Deila joined Maccabi Tel Aviv. In May 2026, Deila was questioned by the Israeli police over allegations of sexually harassing a female taxi driver. He left the club that month and was replaced by assistant Kenny Miller.

== Personal life ==
Deila's twin daughters – Thale Rushfeldt Deila and Live Rushfeldt Deila – are handball players.

== Honours ==
=== Player ===
Odd

- Norwegian Football Cup: 2000

=== Manager ===
Strømsgodset

- Tippeligaen: 2013
- Norwegian Football Cup: 2010

Celtic

- Scottish Premiership: 2014–15, 2015–16
- Scottish League Cup: 2014–15

New York City

- MLS Cup: 2021
- MLS Eastern Conference: 2021

Individual

- Kniksen Award Coach of the Year: 2013

== Managerial statistics ==
As of match played 26 May 2026

Team	From	To	Record				
Team	From	To	G	W	D	L	Win %
Brodd	1 June 2005	6 October 2005	12	7	2	3	58.33
Strømsgodset	1 January 2008	6 June 2014	206	95	41	70	46.12
Celtic	6 June 2014	15 May 2016	118	76	22	20	64.41
Vålerenga	1 January 2017	6 January 2020	107	43	26	38	40.19
New York City	6 January 2020	13 June 2022	90	46	15	29	51.11
Standard Liège	13 June 2022	24 May 2023	40	17	9	14	42.50
Club Brugge	1 July 2023	18 March 2024	49	28	11	10	57.14
Al Wahda	5 July 2024	18 December 2024	11	4	3	4	36.36
Atlanta United	20 December 2024	19 October 2025	37	6	13	18	16.22
Maccabi Tel Aviv	31 January 2026	4 May 2026	19	12	3	4	63.16
Total			689	334	145	210	48.48

^{1}Includes UEFA Champions League qualifier match against Legia Warsaw which Celtic lost 2–0 on the night, but was later awarded as a 3–0 win to Celtic due to Legia fielding a suspended player.
