= Rune Tangen =

Norwegian footballer (born 1964)

Personal information
- Date of birth: 16 December 1964 (age 61)
- Place of birth: Moss, Norway
- Positions: Defender; midfielder

Senior career*
Years	Team	Apps	(Gls)
-1990	Moss FK	122+	(10+)
1991–1993	Rosenborg BK	62	(6)
1994–1996	Moss FK	25+	(2+)
1996-1997/98	FC Tirol Innsbruck	11	(2)
1997/98-1999	LASK	32	(5)
1999–2004	Moss FK	85	(7)
2013	Foot 04	1	(1)

International career
1988–1990	Norway	3	(1)
- * Club domestic league appearances and goals

Rune Tangen (born 16 December 1964) is a Norwegian retired international footballer.
