= Bjarte Lunde Aarsheim =

Norwegian footballer and coach (born 1975)

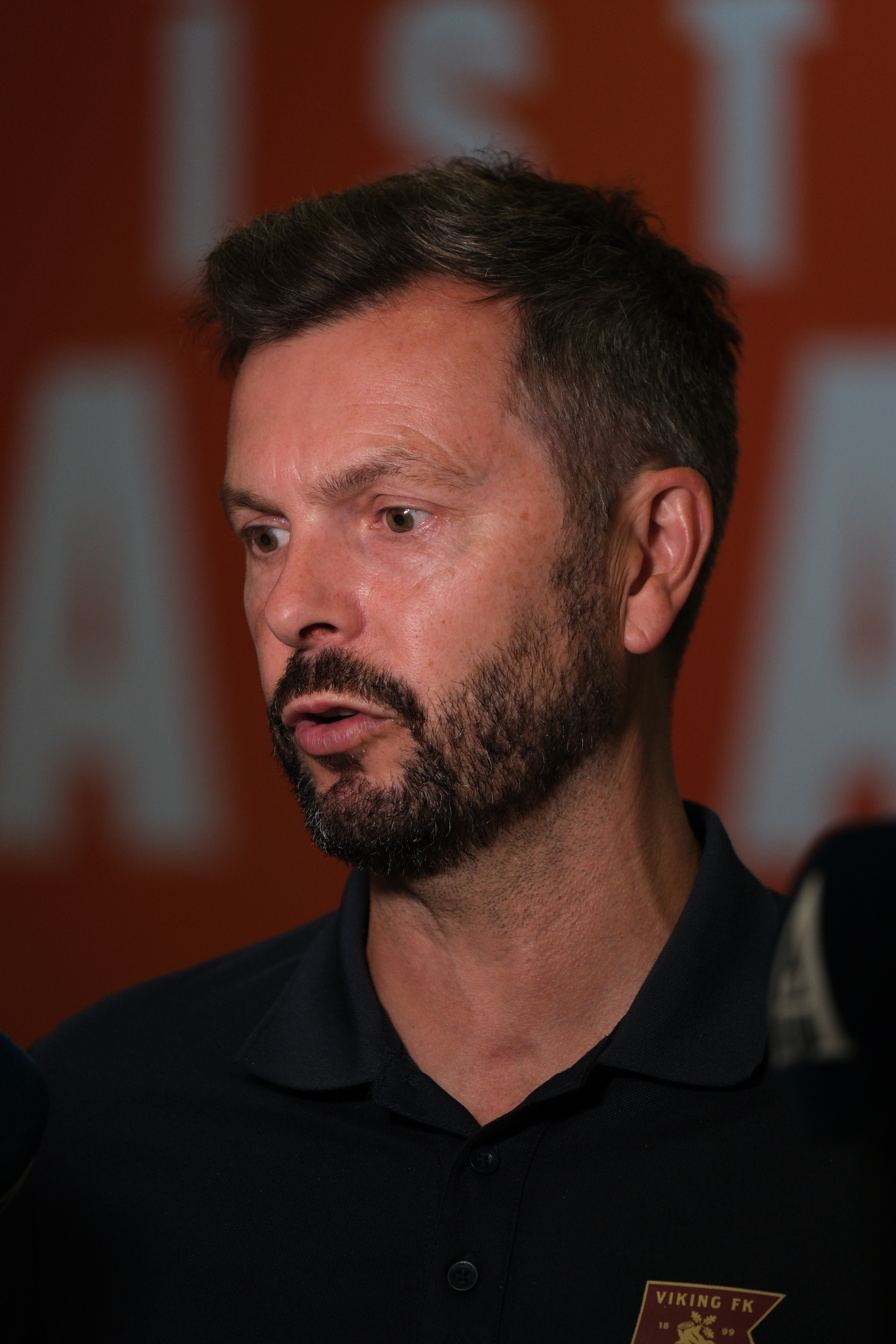
- Lunde Aarsheim as Viking head coach in 2025

Personal information
- Full name: Bjarte Andre Lunde Aarsheim
- Date of birth: 14 January 1975 (age 51)
- Place of birth: Hundvåg, Norway
- Height: 1.78 m (5 ft 10 in)
- Position: Midfielder

Team information
- Current team: Viking (manager)

Youth career
- –1992: Hundvåg

Senior career*
Years	Team	Apps	(Gls)
1993–2005	Viking	222	(15)
2005–2007	Start	42	(1)
2007–2011	Randaberg	84	(6)
2012	Hundvåg	2	(0)
Total		349	(22)

International career
1993	Norway U18	2	(0)
1995–1997	Norway U21	17	(1)
1998	Norway U23	3	(0)
2001	Norway	3	(0)

Managerial career
- 2009–2010: Randaberg
- 2012–2013: Hundvåg
- 2014: Sandnes Ulf (caretaker)
- 2015: Brodd
- 2017: Viking (caretaker)
- 2021–: Viking
- * Club domestic league appearances and goals

Bjarte Andre Lunde Aarsheim (born 14 January 1975) is a Norwegian professional football coach and former player who is currently head coach of Eliteserien club Viking.

Having spent most of his playing career at Viking, Lunde Aarsheim is the player with the eighth most appearances for the club. In a playing career that lasted from 1993 to 2012, he also played for Start, Randaberg and Hundvåg, having the role of player-coach at the latter two. In 2001, he made three appearances for the Norway national team. In addition to his coaching roles at Randaberg and Hundvåg, Lunde Aarsheim has also been a coach at Sandnes Ulf and Brodd.

Lunde Aarsheim was nicknamed "Batty" as his style of play was similar to that of English midfielder David Batty.

== Club career ==
=== Viking ===
Lunde Aarsheim spent the majority of his career at Viking, arriving from local club Hundvåg as a youth. Making his debut for Viking in 1994, he stayed with the club until 2005, playing a total of 425 games in all competitions, including friendly matches. A creative midfielder, Lunde Aarsheim was at his peak during the 2001 season, when he, as captain, led Viking to a league lead before suffering a serious ankle injury in a game against Brann halfway through the season. Although he made an extremely popular five-minute comeback in the Norwegian cup final victory over rivals Bryne later in the year, where in the last five minutes he was on the field, was again given the captain's armband, Lunde Aarsheim never really recovered from the injury, and his last seasons at Viking were plagued by further injuries. He only played 4 games in the 2002 season, and was injured for parts of the 2003 season as well.

=== Start ===
He remained captain of Viking until the end of the 2004 season, but midway through the 2005 season he was released on a free transfer, joining league leaders Start. Start finished the season in 2nd place.

=== Randaberg ===
In the summer of 2007 he surprisingly joined Randaberg, a club playing in the Third Division, the fourth tier of Norwegian football, together with Øyvind Svenning. The team earned promotion to the Second Division in his first season at the club. In November 2008, Lunde Aarsheim and Jørgen Tengesdal were announced as the new head coaches of Ranadaberg, with Lunde Aarsheim taking on the role of player-coach. The team earned promotion to the First Division in the 2010 season, which was also Lunde Aarsheim's last season before he decided to retire and leave the club.

After the 2010 season, he returned to his youth club Hundvåg to become a player developer.

In July 2011, he came out of retirement and returned to Randaberg in the First Division. He played eight matches during the 2011 season.

== International career ==
He made his national team debut in a 3–2 win against South Korea in January 2001, earning a total of three caps for Norway. His last international match was an August 2001 friendly match against Turkey.

== Managerial career ==
=== Hundvåg ===
Ahead of the 2012 season, he again returned to Hundvåg, becoming the head coach of the club, and also playing two matches for the club in the Fourth Division. The team earned promotion to the Third Division in his first season at the club.

=== Sandnes Ulf ===
On 6 December 2013, he was appointed assistant coach of Eliteserien club Sandnes Ulf, signing a one-year contract and becoming a part of head coach Asle Andersen's technical staff. In July 2014, Andersen got sacked, and Lunde Aarsheim served as interim head coach for one match against Molde. He resigned after the match.

=== Brodd ===
On 30 November 2014, Lunde Aarsheim was appointed head coach of Third Division club Brodd. He stayed at Brodd for one season.

=== Viking ===
In Januar 2016, he was hired as a player developer for his former club Viking. Ten months later, in November 2016, he left his role as player developer to become assistant coach of the club, with Ian Burchnall becoming head coach. One year later, after the relegation of Viking to the First Division, Burchnall was sacked, and Lunde Aarsheim led the team in the last two matches of the 2017 season. On 19 December 2017, Viking appointed Bjarne Berntsen as head coach, with Lunde Aarsheim continuing as an assistant coach. He served as an assistant coach under Berntsen for three seasons, in which the club earned promotion to the top division in 2018, and won the Norwegian Football Cup in 2019.

On 26 November 2020, it was announced that Bjarne Berntsen would leave Viking after the 2020 season. Simultaneously, it was announced that Lunde Aarsheim and Morten Jensen would replace Berntsen, taking over as joint head coaches on two-year contracts. Like Lunde Aarsheim, Jensen was also an assistant coach at the club before being appointed head coach. They took charge ahead of the 2021 season. Viking finished the 2021 season in third place, and on 25 March 2022, the head coaches' contracts were extended until the end of the 2025 season. On 25 November 2024, the contracts were extended until the end of the 2028 season. Viking won the 2025 Eliteserien, the club's first league title since 1991, with Aarsheim and Jensen being named Coaches of the Year.

== Career statistics ==
Appearances and goals by club, season and competition
Club	Season	League			Cup		Continental		Total	
Club	Season	Division	Apps	Goals	Apps	Goals	Apps	Goals	Apps	Goals
Viking	1994	Tippeligaen	12	1	3	0	—		15	1
Viking	1995	Tippeligaen	23	2	3	1	2 (Note: Appearances in UEFA Cup)	0	28	3
Viking	1996	Tippeligaen	26	0	4	0	—		30	0
Viking	1997	Tippeligaen	22	3	7	0	4	0	33	3
Viking	1998	Tippeligaen	25	2	2	0	—		27	2
Viking	1999	Tippeligaen	21	1	4	1	5	1	30	3
Viking	2000	Tippeligaen	24	3	5	1	—		29	4
Viking	2001	Tippeligaen	19	2	4	3	2	0	25	5
Viking	2002	Tippeligaen	4	0	3	0	—		7	0
Viking	2003	Tippeligaen	25	1	4	0	—		29	1
Viking	2004	Tippeligaen	17	0	3	1	—		20	1
Viking	2005	Tippeligaen	4	0	1	0	—		5	0
Viking	Total		222	15	43	7	13	1	278	23
Start	2005	Tippeligaen	10	0	0	0	—		10	0
Start	2006	Tippeligaen	24	1	0	0	4	0	28	1
Start	2007	Tippeligaen	7	0	0	0	—		7	0
Start	Total		41	1	0	0	4	0	45	1
Randaberg	2007	3. divisjon	9	0	0	0	—		9	0
Randaberg	2008	2. divisjon	25	3	0	0	—		25	3
Randaberg	2009	2. divisjon	24	2	0	0	—		24	2
Randaberg	2010	2. divisjon	18	1	0	0	—		18	1
Randaberg	2011	1. divisjon	8	0	0	0	—		8	0
Randaberg	Total		84	6	0	0	—		84	6
Hundvåg	2012	4. divisjon	2	0	0	0	—		2	0
Career total			349	22	43	7	17	1	409	30

== Managerial statistics ==
As of match played 30 November 2025

Team	From	To	Record					Reference(s)
Team	From	To	G	W	D	L	Win %	Reference(s)
Sandnes Ulf (interim)	17 July 2014	20 July 2014	1	0	0	1	0.00	
Brodd	1 January 2015	31 December 2015	27	10	4	13	37.04	
Viking (interim)	9 November 2017	26 November 2017	2	1	0	1	50.00	
Viking	1 January 2021	Present	186	108	34	44	58.06	
Total			216	119	38	59	55.09	—

== Honours ==
=== Player ===
Viking

- Norwegian Cup: 2001

=== Manager ===
Viking

- Eliteserien: 2025

Individual

- Eliteserien Coach of the Month: August 2021, July 2023, August 2023, May 2025, November 2025, May 2026
- Eliteserien Coach of the Year: 2025
