= Anders Juliussen =

Norwegian footballer (born 1976)

Anders Juliussen (born 7 May 1976) is a Norwegian football midfielder.

He started his career in SK Sprint-Jeløy, but later became a stalwart in Moss FK for more than ten seasons, including their unbroken first-tier spell from 1998 through 2002. He rejoined Sprint-Jeløy ahead of the 2007 season, and later the lower-division team Tronvik.
