= Alexander Aas =

Norwegian footballer (born 1978)

Personal information
- Full name: Hendrik Alexander van Es Aas
- Date of birth: 14 September 1978 (age 48)
- Place of birth: Skien, Norway
- Height: 1.84 m (6 ft 0 in)
- Position: Centre-back

Youth career
- Skiens Grane

Senior career*
Years	Team	Apps	(Gls)
1995–2004	Odd Grenland	170	(6)
2004–2007	OB	49	(2)
2007–2012	Strømsgodset	118	(10)
Total		337	(18)

International career
2001–2004	Norway	8	(1)
- * Club domestic league appearances and goals

Hendrik Alexander van Es Aas (born 14 September 1978), known as Alexander Aas, is a Norwegian former professional footballer who played as a centre-back.

Aas spent most of his career playing for Odd Grenland, before moving to Denmark for a two-year spell with OB. In 2007, he was brought back to Norwegian football by Strømsgodset, where he was club captain until his retirement at the end of the 2012 season. Aas was capped by Norway eight times, scoring one goal.

He was known for his long throw-ins.

== Career ==
=== Odd Grenland ===
Alexander Aas came to Odd Grenland from Skiens Grane as a junior player. He got called up to the main squad in 1996 and made his debut against Hamarkameratene. He played 3 games during his first season with Odd Grenland (2 league and 1 cup match). At the end of August 1996, he broke his ankle during a training session.

In April 1997, he broke his leg. In 1998, he had his breakthrough in Odd Grenland and played all 26 league matches and scored 2 goals and helped Odd Grenland secure a spot in Tippeligaen 1999. He also got a spot on the Norway national under-21 football team. Alexander won the 2000 Norwegian Football Cup Final with Odd Grenland. The team's first cup championship in 39 years. In 2000, he had a trial with Southampton.

On 20 September 2001, he was in the starting line-up for Odd Grenland when they played their first match in the UEFA Cup against Helsingborg. The match ended 2–2 on Odd stadion and they played 1–1 in Helsingborg. Odd Grenland lost on away goals.

He went on a 10-day trial with Wolverhampton Wanderers in 2004 and played one game for their reserve team.

=== OB ===
In January 2005, he signed a two-year contract with Danish Superliga club OB. In the summer of 2006, Alexander signed a two-year extension.

=== Strømsgodset ===
In December 2006, OB sold Alexander Aas to Strømsgodset. Aas took over as captain for Strømsgodset in 2008 after Øyvind Leonhardsen retired.

== Career statistics ==
Appearances and goals by club, season and competition
Club	Season	League			National cup		Total	
Club	Season	Division	Apps	Goals	Apps	Goals	Apps	Goals
Strømsgodset	2007	Tippeligaen	25	2	5	0	30	2
Strømsgodset	2008	Tippeligaen	19	1	4	1	23	2
Strømsgodset	2009	Tippeligaen	25	1	2	0	27	0
Strømsgodset	2010	Tippeligaen	12	0	6	0	18	0
Strømsgodset	2011	Tippeligaen	25	3	2	0	27	3
Strømsgodset	2012	Tippeligaen	12	3	2	0	14	3
Career total			118	10	21	1	139	11

== Honours ==
Odd Grenland

- Norwegian Football Cup: 2000

OB

- Danish Cup: 2006–07

Strømsgodset

- Norwegian Football Cup: 2010
