= Gunnar Aase =

Norwegian footballer (born 1971)

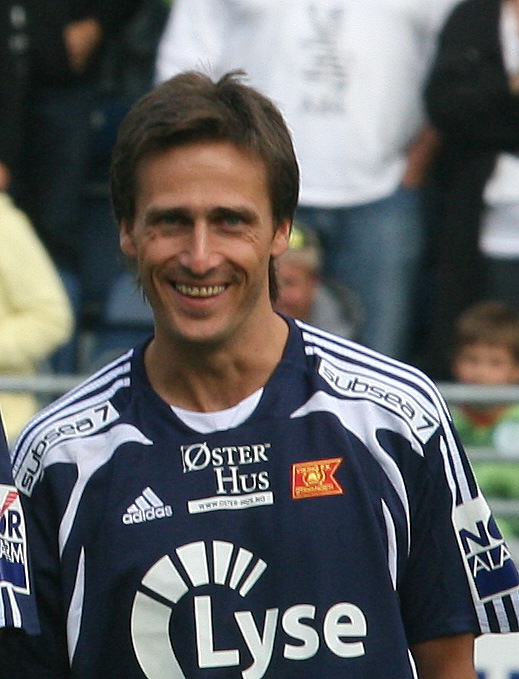

Personal information
- Date of birth: 29 September 1971 (age 55)
- Place of birth: Norway
- Position: Right midfielder

Youth career
- Sola
- Ulf-Sandnes

Senior career*
Years	Team	Apps	(Gls)
1990–2000	Viking	185	(40)

International career
1987	Norway U15	12	(0)
1988	Norway U16	5	(0)
1988	Norway U17	2	(0)
1989	Norway U18	9	(1)
1990–1993	Norway U21	14	(3)
1995	Norway	3	(1)

Managerial career
- 2003: Sola (joint head coach)
- * Club domestic league appearances and goals

Gunnar Aase (born 29 September 1971) is a Norwegian former player who played as a midfielder.

He played for Viking FK in the Norwegian Premier League from 1990 to 2000. In 1991 Viking with Aase on the team won the Premier League. He retired after the 2000 season which ended with a loss in the Norwegian Football Cup Final and a conflict with the club who wanted to reduce his salary. Aase was also a prolific youth international.

In 2003, he coached Sola FK together with Børre Meinseth.
