= Rino Hansen =

Norwegian footballer (1970–2024)

Personal information
- Full name: Rino André Hansen
- Date of birth: 14 March 1970
- Date of death: 20 November 2024 (aged 54)
- Height: 1.92 m (6 ft 4 in)
- Position: Goalkeeper

Youth career
- Østsiden

Senior career*
Years	Team	Apps	(Gls)
- Østsiden
1994–2001	Moss		
2002–2003	Fredrikstad		
2004–2006	Sparta Sarpsborg		
2007–2008	Østsiden		
2012	Sarpsborg		
- * Club domestic league appearances and goals

Rino André Hansen (14 March 1970 – 20 November 2024) was a Norwegian footballer who played as a goalkeeper.

In 1994, he was originally the backup for Ronny Hvambsal, but manager Mike Speight quickly made Hansen the first choice. In 1995 he helped secure promotion from the 1995 1. divisjon, and was lauded by the new Moss manager Per Mathias Høgmo as a possible future Norway international.

Already before making his debut in the Eliteserien in 1996, Moss was contacted by Bolton Wanderers regarding the asking price for Rino Hansen. During the summer, he was scouted by Steve Coppell for Crystal Palace. He was also criticised by some fans for taking too much of the "sweeper" role, leading to two or three mistakes in the early phase of the 1996 Eliteserien.

In the 1998 Norwegian Football Cup semi final against Stabæk, Hansen was praised for his performance in ordinary and extra time, which ended 0–0. In the ensuing penalty shootout, Hansen missed his penalty, upon which Moss were eliminated with 1–3.

After the 2003 season, he moved to the new attempt to create an elite club in Sarpsborg, FK Sparta Sarpsborg. Fredrikstad only offered a one-year contract whereas Sparta offered a longer timespan.

Hansen died from cancer on 20 November 2024, at the age of 54.
