= Kent Bergersen =

Norwegian footballer and manager (born 1967)

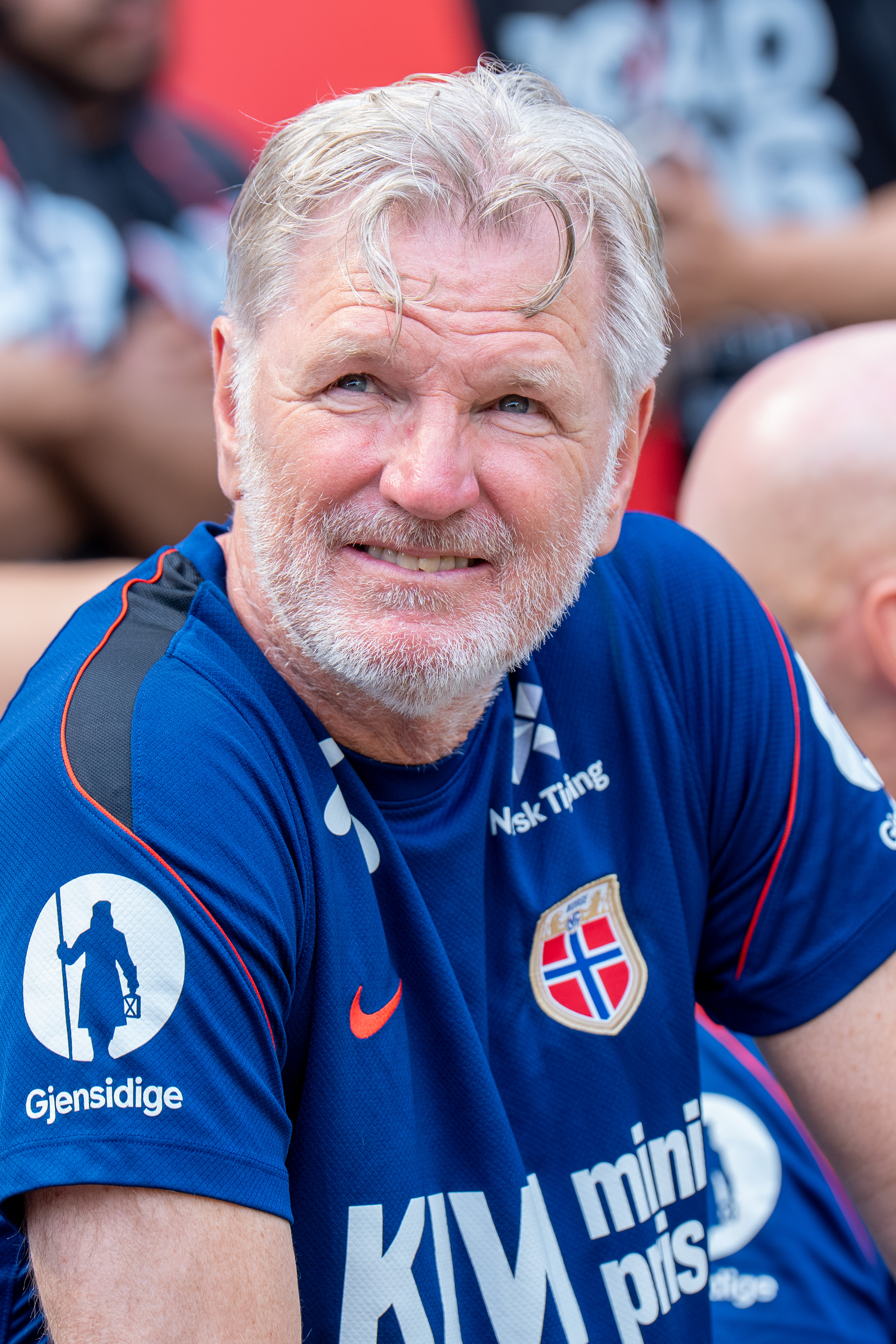
- Bergersen with Norway in 2026

Personal information
- Full name: Kent Roger Bergersen
- Date of birth: 8 February 1967 (age 59)
- Place of birth: Oslo, Norway
- Height: 1.78 m (5 ft 10 in)
- Position: Winger (association football)

Team information
- Current team: Norway (assistant manager)

Youth career
- 1983–1985: Grue

Senior career*
| Years | Team | Apps | (Gls) |
| 1986–1990 | Drøbak-Frogn | | |
| 1991–1992 | Lyn | 40 | (5) |
| 1993–1994 | Rosenborg | 43 | (15) |
| 1995–1996 | Vålerenga | 44 | (9) |
| 1996 | Raith Rovers | 6 | (1) |
| 1997–1999 | Panionios | 40 | (2) |
| 1999 | Strømsgodset | 8 | (4) |
| 1999–2001 | Stockport County | 26 | (1) |
| 2000 | → Moss (loan) | 13 | (2) |
| 2001–2002 | Moss | 25 | (1) |
| 2002 | Fredrikstad | 12 | (2) |
| 2003 | Drøbak-Frogn | | |

Managerial career
- 2003–2005: Drøbak-Frogn
- 2005–2007: Bodø/Glimt
- 2008–2009: Lyn
- 2010–2014: Aalesund (assistant)
- 2015–2016: HamKam
- 2017–2020: Kvik Halden
- 2020–: Norway (assistant)
- * Club domestic league appearances and goals

Kent Roger Bergersen (born 8 February 1967), nicknamed Kenta, is a Norwegian football coach and former footballer. He is currently the assistant manager of Norway.

He is known for having played for a large number of different clubs throughout the years in a variety of top-flight clubs in Norway, Greece, Scotland and England. Despite his success, he never managed to settle down for more than a few seasons at the most.

== Club career ==
Bergersen was born in Oslo and brought up in Grue Municipality in Hedmark. After playing as a youngster in Grue IL he started his senior career in Drøbak-Frogn. After joining Lyn ahead of the 1991-season, Bergersen made his debut in Tippeligaen against Molde on 28 April 1991. During his two seasons at the club, Bergersen became a valuable contributor for Lyn where he played 40 matches and scored five goals as a winger. He joined Rosenborg in 1993, and made his debut for his new club against his old club Lyn on 2 May 1993. Bergersen played for Rosenborg for two years, and won Tippeligaen in both seasons. He scored 15 goals in 43 matches in the league for Rosenborg, before he joined Vålerenga. He played 44 matches and scored nine goals in the next two seasons, but left for Scottish club Raith Rovers after Vålerenga were relegated in 1996. In his first match in Scotland, Bergersen played 90 minutes when Raith Rovers managed a 2–2 draw against Rangers. Bergersen played for Raith Rovers for three months, and was named man of the match in four of the six matches he played, before he transferred to Greek club Panionios.

Bergersen played two season for Panionios, where he won the Greek Cup and reached the quarterfinal of the UEFA Cup Winner's Cup in 1998–99, but left the club in 1999 because he didn't get his salary. In April 1999 he signed a short-term contract with Strømsgodset lasting until 1 August. He later played for Stockport County from 1999 to 2001, After playing 12 matches in his first season in England, Bergersen was sent on a six-month loan to Moss along with Aaron Wilbraham when Stockport County bought Jarkko Wiss from the Norwegian club in July 2000. Bergersen later returned to Stockport, but as the club had no use for him, they released him two months before the contract expired and Bergersen joined Moss in May 2001. He played for the Second Division side Fredrikstad during the second half of the 2002-season, and helped the team win promotion to the First Division.

== Coaching career ==
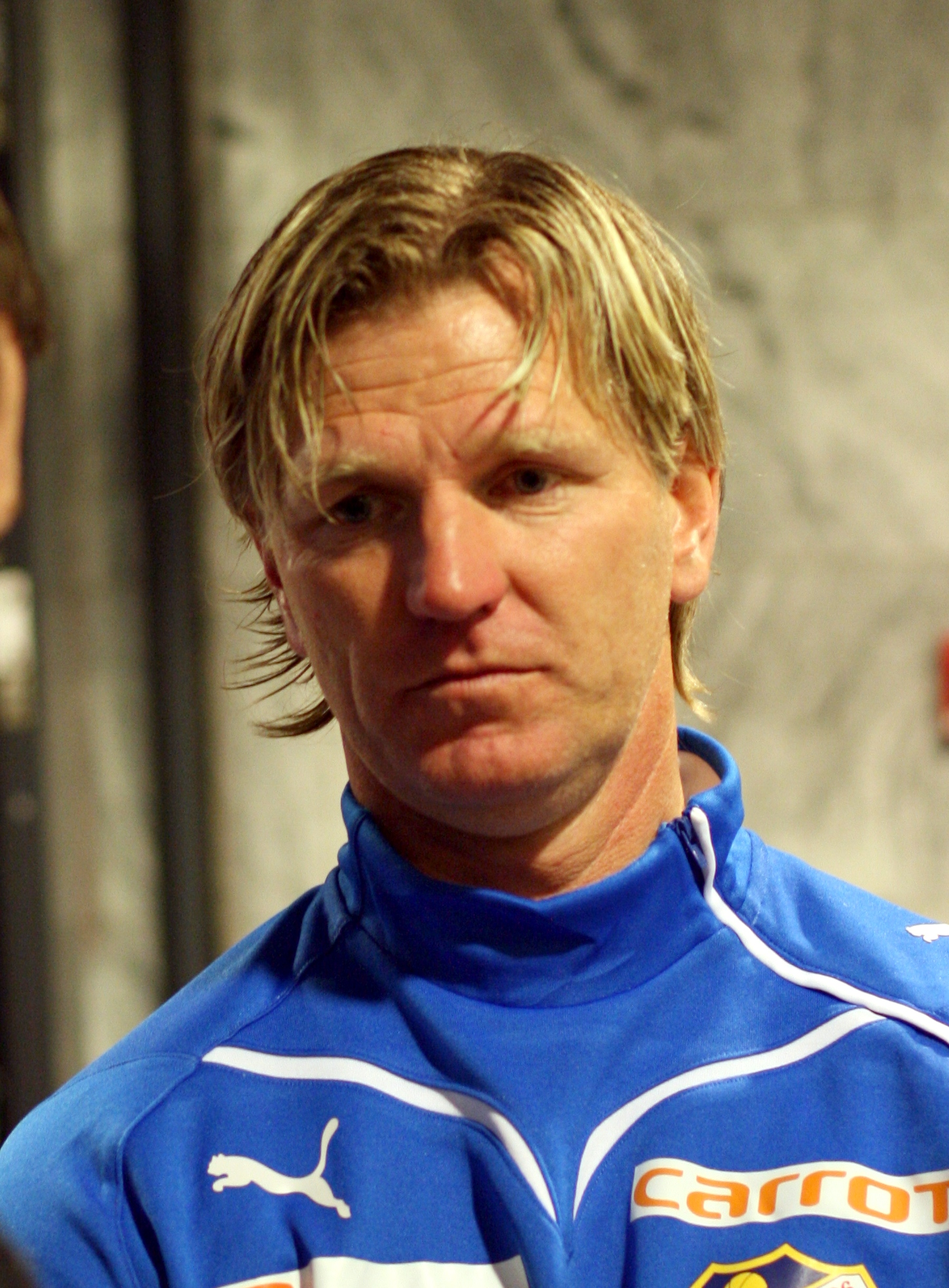

In 2003 Bergersen stepped down from professional football and joined the Third Division side Drøbak-Frogn as a player-coach. After the 2003-season, Bergersen retired and continued as head coach of Drøbak-Frogn for the next two seasons, before joining second-tier club Bodø/Glimt in 2005 along with club legend Erik Hoftun and securing promotion and comeback to Tippeligaen in 2007.

Later it was announced before the 2008 season that he was going to sign for Lyn first as assistant to Henning Berg later however he was promoted to head-coach as Berg was sacked after a string of poor results. In 2009 after much public dispute he too left the club due to poor results as well as the club descending into financial chaos and an abyss from which it would take years to recover.

In the run-up to the 2010 season he was offered a position as assistant coach under Kjetil Rekdal at Aalesund which he accepted, something the players at the club was hugely positive towards as many of them had played under him in previous clubs. Throughout his spell at Aalesund he has won praise for his ability to develop players' individual skills. He is signed with Aalesund through the 2013 season.

On 10 December 2020 it was announced he was appointed as assistant manager to the Norway national football team.

== Personal life ==
Bergersen enjoys golfing on his spare time. His son, Jonas Bergersen (born 1993), is also a footballer and has played for Drøbak/Frogn and Moss.
