= Bård Borgersen =

Norwegian footballer (born 1972)

Personal information
- Date of birth: 20 May 1972 (age 54)
- Place of birth: Kristiansand, Norway
- Height: 1.88 m (6 ft 2 in)
- Position: Centre-back

Youth career
- Våg

Senior career*
Years	Team	Apps	(Gls)
	Start	0	(0)
1992–1995	Bryne FK		
1996–2001	Odd Grenland	149	(19)
2001–2005	AaB Aalborg	46	(1)
2005–2011	Start	111	(8)

International career
2001–2006	Norway	10	(2)

Managerial career
- 2015: Start
- * Club domestic league appearances and goals

Bård Borgersen (born 20 May 1972) is a Norwegian former footballer who played as a centre-back, most notable for his time with Odd Grenland and Start. Borgersen was capped 10 times and scored two goals for the Norway national team.

== Club career ==
Born Kristiansand, Norway, Borgersen started his career at hometown side Start before moving to Adeccoligaen team Bryne FK. After four seasons he signed for fellow second division team Odd Grenland with whom he clinched the 1998 title and promotion to the Tippeligaen. He moved to Denmark in 2001 but returned after four seasons to finally rejoin Start.

From 2009 he is a playing assistant coach of Start. He retired after the 2011 season.

== International career ==
Borgersen made his debut for the Norway national team in an October 2001 World Cup qualifying match against Armenia. He scored his first goal three minutes after coming on as a second-half substitute for Ronny Johnsen and a second 10 minutes from full-time. He collected 10 caps in total, playing his last international match in March 2006 against Senegal.

== Personal life ==
On the evening of 26 June 2010, Borgersen, who was accompanied by his wife, was violently assaulted by an unknown individual in Kristiansand. Late that same year, a 24-year-old was sentenced to 45 hours of community service after pleading guilty and taking into account his rehabilitative status.

== Career statistics ==
Appearances and goals by club, season and competition
Season	Club	League			Cup		Total	
Season	Club	Division	Apps	Goals	Apps	Goals	Apps	Goals
Start	2005	Tippeligaen	21	4	4	0	25	4
Start	2006	Tippeligaen	15	1	3	0	18	1
Start	2007	Tippeligaen	2	0	0	0	2	0
Start	2008	Adeccoligaen	28	1	1	0	29	1
Start	2009	Tippeligaen	24	2	1	0	25	2
Start	2010	Tippeligaen	10	0	1	0	11	0
Start	2011	Tippeligaen	11	0	3	0	14	0
Career total			111	8	13	0	124	8

== Honours ==
- Kniksen Award as defender of the year 2005
