= Hans Erik Ramberg =

Norwegian footballer (born 1976)

Personal information
- Full name: Hans Erik Ramberg
- Date of birth: August 8, 1976 (age 50)
- Place of birth: Fredrikstad, Norway
- Height: 1.78 m (5 ft 10 in)
- Position: Midfielder

Senior career*
| Years | Team | Apps | (Gls) |
| 1993 | Fredrikstad | 7 | (1) |
| 1994 | Ajax | 0 | (0) |
| 1995–1997 | Fredrikstad | 38 | (3) |
| 1998–2002 | Moss | 120 | (15) |
| 2005–2013 | Fredrikstad | 212 | (8) |
- * Club domestic league appearances and goals

Hans Erik Ramberg (born August 8, 1976) is a Norwegian former footballer.

As a youngster, he was considered to be one of the greatest talents in Norway. He signed for AFC Ajax at a very young age. However, an injury made him unable to continue his career. He chose to retire as a football player, and instead work as a teacher. But he was not to fully give up his career; Before the 2005 Tippeligaen season he was once again playing football, and joined Fredrikstad.

He retired after the 2013 season.

== Career statistics ==
As of 2 November 2013

| Season | Club | Division | League | | Cup | | Total | |
| Season | Club | Division | Apps | Goals | Apps | Goals | Apps | Goals |
|---|---|---|---|---|---|---|---|---|
| 1997 | Moss | Adeccoligaen | 23 | 4 | 0 | 0 | 23 | 4 |
| 1998 | Moss | Tippeligaen | 24 | 0 | 0 | 0 | 24 | 0 |
| 1999 | Moss | Tippeligaen | 22 | 3 | 0 | 0 | 23 | 3 |
| 2000 | Moss | Tippeligaen | 25 | 3 | 3 | 3 | 28 | 6 |
| 2001 | Moss | Tippeligaen | 18 | 4 | 3 | 0 | 21 | 4 |
| 2002 | Moss | Tippeligaen | 8 | 1 | 0 | 0 | 8 | 1 |
| 2005 | Fredrikstad | Tippeligaen | 22 | 1 | 1 | 0 | 23 | 1 |
| 2006 | Fredrikstad | Tippeligaen | 25 | 1 | 6 | 1 | 31 | 2 |
| 2007 | Fredrikstad | Tippeligaen | 20 | 0 | 2 | 1 | 22 | 1 |
| 2008 | Fredrikstad | Tippeligaen | 23 | 2 | 4 | 0 | 27 | 2 |
| 2009 | Fredrikstad | Tippeligaen | 24 | 2 | 1 | 0 | 25 | 2 |
| 2010 | Fredrikstad | Adeccoligaen | 27 | 1 | 3 | 0 | 30 | 1 |
| 2011 | Fredrikstad | Tippeligaen | 25 | 1 | 2 | 0 | 27 | 1 |
| 2012 | Fredrikstad | Tippeligaen | 18 | 0 | 0 | 0 | 18 | 0 |
| 2013 | Fredrikstad | Adeccoligaen | 28 | 0 | 3 | 0 | 31 | 0 |
| Career Total | | | 332 | 23 | 28 | 5 | 360 | 28 |
