= Johan-Petter Winsnes =

Norwegian footballer (born 1975)

Personal information
- Date of birth: 15 November 1975 (age 50)
- Height: 1.83 m (6 ft 0 in)
- Position: Defender

Youth career
- –1996: Rosenborg

Senior career*
| Years | Team | Apps | (Gls) |
| 1997 | Skeid | 9 | (0) |
| 1998–1999 | Byåsen | 35 | (1) |
| 1999−2001 | Moss | 51 | (1) |
| 2002–2007 | Lillestrøm | 60 | (2) |
| 2007 | Skeid | 10 | (0) |
- * Club domestic league appearances and goals

Johan-Petter Winsnes (born 15 November 1975) is a retired Norwegian football defender.

He is a second cousin of Fredrik Winsnes. Johan-Petter Winsnes came through the ranks of Rosenborg BK, and played friendly matches in 1995 and 1996, including one against AIK. However, he did not make the squad and joined Skeid in 1997. He went on to Byåsen, Moss and Lillestrøm before finishing his career in Skeid.
