= Erik Holtan =

Norwegian footballer (born 1969)

Personal information
- Date of birth: 20 April 1969 (age 57)
- Place of birth: Moss, Norway
- Height: 1.82 m (6 ft 0 in)
- Position: Goalkeeper

Youth career
- Moss FK

Senior career*
Years	Team	Apps	(Gls)
1988	Odd Ballklubb	1	(0)
1990–1994	Kongsvinger IL	76	(0)
1995–2005	Odd Grenland	236	(0)
2006–2008	Moss FK	30	(0)
2006	→Bryne FK (Loan)	2	(0)

International career^{‡}
2002–2004	Norway A	6	(0)

Managerial career
- 2010: Moss FK
- * Club domestic league appearances and goals as of 23 May 2009 ‡ National team caps and goals as of 23 May 2009

Erik Holtan (born 20 April 1969) is a retired Norwegian footballer who played as a goalkeeper. He played the majority of his career for Odd Grenland..

He made his debut in the Norwegian Premier League in 1990, when he played for Kongsvinger IL. From 1995 he played for Odd Grenland and remained one of the main profiles until he was replaced by Rune Jarstein after suffering an injury in the 2005 season. He then moved back to his hometown club Moss FK. During the final practice before the kick-off of the 2007 season in Norwegian football Holtan had a career-ending injury and retired a year prematurely. He went on to work as a goalkeeper coach for Moss.

Erik Holtan was capped six times for Norway, and won the 2002 Kniksen award as goalkeeper of the year.
