= Morten Fevang =

Norwegian footballer (born 1975)

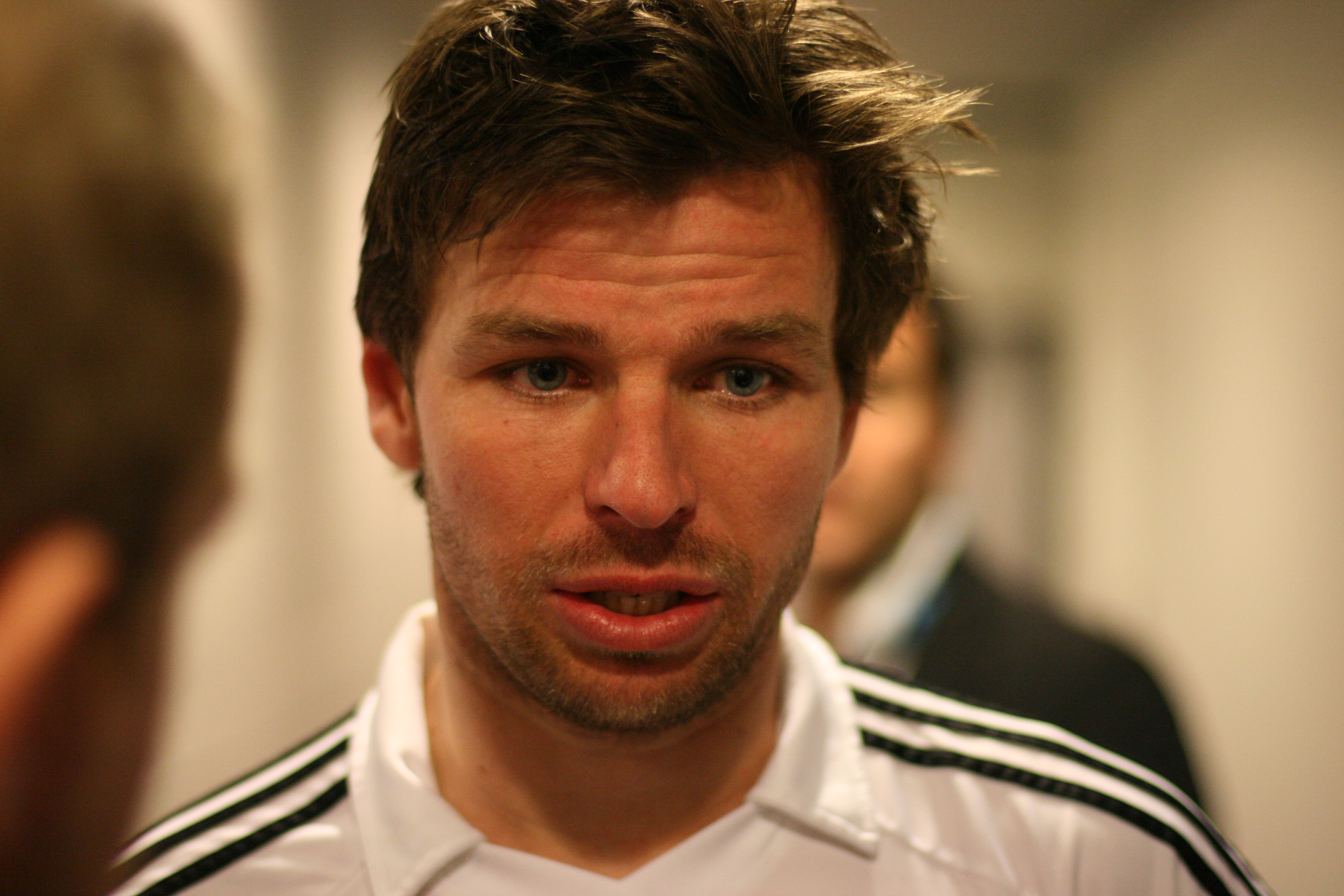

Personal information
- Date of birth: 6 March 1975 (age 51)
- Place of birth: Sandefjord, Norway
- Height: 1.85 m (6 ft 1 in)
- Positions: Midfielder; defender

Senior career*
Years	Team	Apps	(Gls)
1996–1998	Runar	24	(3)
1998–2005	Odd Grenland	183	(28)
2006–2007	OB	28	(5)
2007–2013	Odd	173	(37)
2014	Notodden	10	(1)

International career^{‡}
2009	Norway	1	(0)
- * Club domestic league appearances and goals as of 4 April 2014 ‡ National team caps and goals as of 11 June 2009

Morten Fevang (born 6 March 1975) is a retired Norwegian professional football player.

== Club career ==
He came to OB from Odd Grenland, and on 28 May 2007 he announced a move home to Odd at the beginning of the summer transfer window.

== International career ==
On 25 May 2009, he was selected by Egil "Drillo" Olsen to be a part of the Norwegian national team for the first time, at the age of 34. He made his debut in a 0–2 loss away to Netherlands in a world cup qualifier. This became his only appearance for the national team.

== Career statistics ==
As of 3 August 2013

Season	Club	Division	League		Cup		Total	
Season	Club	Division	Apps	Goals	Apps	Goals	Apps	Goals
1998	Odd Grenland	Adeccoligaen	24	5	0	0	24	5
1999	Odd Grenland	Tippeligaen	24	2	0	0	24	2
2000	Odd Grenland	Tippeligaen	23	5	5	2	28	7
2001	Odd Grenland	Tippeligaen	22	2	5	4	27	6
2002	Odd Grenland	Tippeligaen	24	3	7	2	31	5
2003	Odd Grenland	Tippeligaen	23	6	3	2	26	8
2004	Odd Grenland	Tippeligaen	24	4	2	1	26	5
2005	Odd Grenland	Tippeligaen	19	1	5	1	24	2
2005–06	OB	Superliga	7	3	0	0	7	3
2006–07	OB	Superliga	21	2	0	0	21	2
2007	Odd	Tippeligaen	11	1	2	3	13	4
2008	Odd	Adeccoligaen	29	15	3	0	32	15
2009	Odd	Tippeligaen	29	5	5	1	34	6
2010	Odd	Tippeligaen	29	6	4	1	33	7
2011	Odd	Tippeligaen	28	5	4	0	32	5
2012	Odd	Tippeligaen	26	4	2	0	28	4
2013	Odd	Tippeligaen	21	1	4	1	25	2
Career Total			384	70	51	18	435	88

== Honours ==
OB

- Danish Cup: 2006–07
