= Bjørn Dahl (footballer, born 1978) =

Norwegian footballer

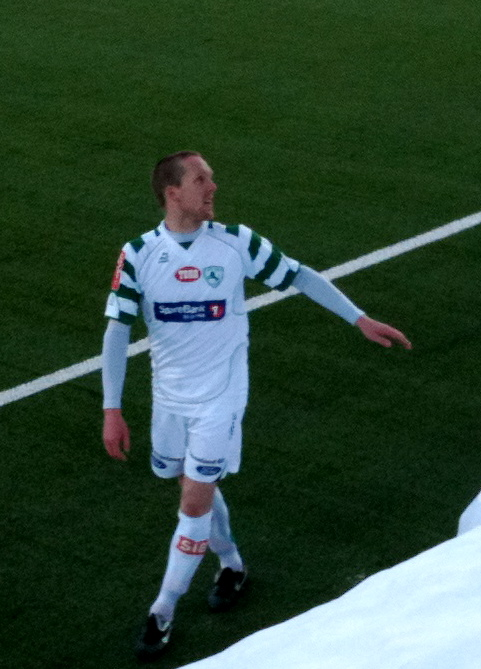

Personal information
- Full name: Bjørn Dahl
- Date of birth: 7 April 1978 (age 48)
- Place of birth: Bergen, Norway
- Height: 1.81 m (5 ft 11 1/2 in)
- Positions: Right full back; wingback

Senior career*
Years	Team	Apps	(Gls)
- Os
1998–2005	Viking	171	(5)
2006–2009	Brann	64	(0)
2009	Hønefoss	11	(0)
2010–2011	Løv-Ham	51	(2)

International career^{‡}
	Norway U21	4	(0)
2004	Norway	1	(0)
- * Club domestic league appearances and goals as of 26 July 2010 ‡ National team caps and goals as of 16 May 2006

Bjørn Dahl (born 7 April 1978) is a retired Norwegian footballer from Os Municipality, Norway. He has represented the Norway national football team, and he has won the Norwegian Premier League and the Norwegian football cup.

== Career ==
He has played most of his career in Viking FK, but transferred to SK Brann in a trade deal, when Viking bought the central defender Ragnvald Soma from Brann. In addition to Dahl, Brann was paid between £520.000 and £610.000 (€750.000-€880.000).

In 2009, he joined Hønefoss BK, and in 2010, Løv-Ham. He retired after the 2011 season.

== Career statistics ==
As of 11 January 2015

Season	Club	Division	League		National Cup		League Cup		Europe		Total	
Season	Club	Division	Apps	Goals	Apps	Goals	Apps	Goals	Apps	Goals	Apps	Goals
1998	Viking	Tippeligaen	20	0	2	0	—		—		22	0
1999	Viking	Tippeligaen	14	0	3	0	—		3	0	20	0
2000	Viking	Tippeligaen	15	1	4	1	—		—		19	2
2001	Viking	Tippeligaen	26	3	6	1	—		6	0	38	4
2002	Viking	Tippeligaen	26	0	4	1	—		4	0	34	1
2003	Viking	Tippeligaen	24	0	4	0	—		—		28	0
2004	Viking	Tippeligaen	22	0	2	0	—		—		24	0
2005	Viking	Tippeligaen	24	0	2	0	—		9	0	35	0
2006	Brann	Tippeligaen	23	0	0	0	—		—		23	0
2007	Brann	Tippeligaen	15	0	0	0	—		—		15	0
2008	Brann	Tippeligaen	21	0	0	0	—		—		21	0
2009	Brann	Tippeligaen	5	1	0	0	—		—		5	1
2009	Hønefoss	Adeccoligaen	11	0	0	0	—		—		11	0
2010	Løv-Ham	Adeccoligaen	24	0	0	0	—		—		24	0
2011	Løv-Ham	Adeccoligaen	27	2	0	0	—		—		27	2
Career Total			297	7	27	3	0	0	22	0	346	10

== Honours ==
=== Norway ===
- Norwegian Premier League: 2007
- Norwegian Cup: 2001
