= Christian Flindt Bjerg =

Danish footballer (born 1974)

Personal information
- Date of birth: February 19, 1974 (age 52)
- Place of birth: Innsbruck, Austria
- Height: 1.79 m (5 ft 10 in)
- Position: Midfielder

Senior career*
Years	Team	Apps	(Gls)
1992–1993	AaB	1	(0)
1992–1995	Karlsruher SC	1	(0)
1995–1996	Lugano	15	(0)
1996–1997	Tirol Innsbruck	18	(0)
1997–1998	Viking	34	(11)
1999–2005	Odd Grenland	154	(28)
2005–2007	Viborg	22	(1)
2007–2008	Jetsmark	15	(2)
2008–2011	Thisted	35	(11)

Managerial career
- 2011–2014: Thisted (youth)
- 2014–2015: Thisted
- 2015–2017: AGF (U19)
- 2017–2020: Vejgaard
- 2020–2021: Skive (assistant)
- 2021–2022: Skive
- * Club domestic league appearances and goals

Christian Flindt Bjerg (born 19 February 1974) is a Danish professional football manager and former player. He is currently the manager of Danish 2nd Division club Skive IK.

== Early life ==
Flindt Bjerg was born in 1974 in Innsbruck, Austria, when his father, the Danish international Ove Flindt Bjerg, played for FC Wacker Innsbruck.

== Playing career ==
Flindt Bjerg began his senior career in 1991 for AaB. Several club abroad followed. At German club Karlsruher SC he played for the reserve team in the Oberliga, and only made one first-team appearance in the Bundesliga during his three years at the club: on the 25th matchday of the 1994–95 season in a 1–1 draw against Eintracht Frankfurt, where he came on as a substitute in the 63rd minute for Thorsten Fink. Other clubs in Flindt Bjerg's career were Lugano, Tirol Innsbruck and the Norwegian clubs Viking and Odd Grenland. With Odd Grenland, he won the Norwegian Football Cup in 2000. Flindt Bjerg scored the winning goal in extra time to make it 2–1 against his former club Viking. In 2005, he returned to Denmark, where he played for Viborg, Jetsmark and Thisted.

== Managerial career ==
After finishing his playing career in Thisted in 2011, Flindt Bjerg coached the local under-19 team there. In 2014, he was appointed head coach of the senior team competing in the third-tier 2nd Division West. In April 2015, it was announced that Flindt Bjerg had been appointed coach of the under-19 team of AGF.

After two years in the youth department of the club from Aarhus, Flindt Bjerg was hired as the new head coach of recently relegated fourth-tier Denmark Series club Vejgaard BK from Aalborg. During three years at the club, he both led the club back to the 2nd Division and experienced a relegation.

On 31 July 2020, Flindt Bjerg was appointed as the assistant to head coach Martin Thomsen at Skive IK, while tending to his job as a scout for German club Borussia Mönchengladbach. After Thomsen left Skive for a manager job at Hobro IK, Flindt Bjerg was appointed head coach of Skive on 21 June 2021. On 10 June 2022 it was confirmed, that Flindt Bjerg's contract had been terminated by mutual consent.

== Honours ==
=== Player ===
Odd Grenland

- Norwegian Football Cup: 2000

=== Manager ===
Vejgaard

- Denmark Series: 2017–18
