= Tollnes BK =

Norwegian football club

- Full name: Tollnes Ballklubb
- Founded: 27 September 1932
- Ground: Tollnes stadion, Skien
- League: Third division
- 2014: Third Division - Group 5, 3rd
Home colours	Away colours

Tollnes Ballklubb is a Norwegian football club located in Skien. It currently plays in the Norwegian Third Division.

It was a member of Arbeidernes Idrettsforbund before the Second World War.

== Recent history ==
Season		Pos.	Pl.	W	D	L	GS	GA	P	Cup	Notes
2000	D2	5	22	11	4	7	51	35	37	3rd round	
2001	D2	1	26	14	8	4	73	47	50	1st round	Promoted to 1. Division
2002	D1	16	30	6	1	23	37	92	19	2nd round	Relegated to 2. Division
2003	D2	4	26	11	9	6	53	45	42	1st round	
2004	D2	4	26	16	2	8	68	42	50	2nd round	
2005	D2	7	26	11	4	11	49	46	37	1st round	
2006	D2	12	26	7	5	14	31	59	26	1st round	Relegated to 3. Division
2007	D3	1	22	17	2	3	71	20	53	1st round	
2008	D3	7	26	11	3	12	63	70	36	2nd qualifying round	
2009	D3	5	26	13	2	11	81	55	41	1st qualifying round	
2010	D3	4	26	17	3	6	89	41	54	1st round	
2011	D3	10	24	8	4	12	60	86	28	1st qualifying round	
2012	D3	9	26	10	3	13	47	55	33	1st qualifying round	
