= 2004 Molde FK season =

Molde
2004 season
- Chairman: Oddne Hansen
- Head coach: Reidar Vågnes
- Stadium: Molde Stadion
- Tippeligaen: 11th
- Norwegian Cup: Third Round vs. Vard Haugesund
- Top goalscorer: League: Magne Hoseth (4); Bernt Hulsker (4); Thomas Mork (4); All: Øyvind Hoås (6)
- Highest home attendance: 9,142 vs Rosenborg (29 August 2004)
- Lowest home attendance: 587 vs Vard Haugesund (9 June 2004)
- Average home league attendance: 5,554

The 2004 season was Molde's 29th season in the top flight of Norwegian football. In Tippeligaen they finished in 11th position.

Molde participated in the Norwegian Cup. On 9 June 2004, Molde was defeated 1–2 by Vard Haugesund in the third round.

== Squad ==
Note: Flags indicate national team as defined under FIFA eligibility rules; some limited exceptions apply. Players may hold more than one non-FIFA nationality.

No.	Pos.	Nation	Player
1	GK	SWE	Eddie Gustafsson
2	DF	NOR	Martin Høyem
3	DF	SWE	Marcus Andreasson
4	DF	FIN	Toni Kallio
5	DF	NOR	Øyvind Gjerde
7	MF	NOR	Thomas Mork
8	FW	NOR	Arild Stavrum
9	FW	NOR	Bernt Hulsker
10	MF	NOR	Magne Hoseth
11	MF	SWE	Magnus Kihlberg (Captain)
12	GK	NOR	Knut Dørum Lillebakk
13	FW	NOR	Øyvind Hoås
14	MF	NOR	John Andreas Husøy
15	MF	NOR	Petter Rudi

No.	Pos.	Nation	Player
16	DF	NOR	Erlend Ormbostad
17	DF	NOR	Trond Strande
18	FW	NOR	Stig Arild Råket
19	MF	NOR	Anders Hasselgård
20	FW	NOR	Kai Røberg
21	DF	NOR	Knut Olav Rindarøy
22	GK	NOR	Lars Ivar Moldskred
23	DF	NOR	Torgeir Ruud Ramsli
24	DF	SVN	Matej Mavric
25	MF	SVN	Mitja Brulc
26	FW	CAN	Rob Friend
27	FW	NOR	Tommy Eide Møster

As of end of season.

== Transfers ==
=== In ===
Date	Position	Nationality	Name	From	Fee
5 December 2003	DF	(Norway)	Øyvind Gjerde	(Norway) Aalesund	Unknown
22 December 2003	MF	(Norway)	Petter Rudi	Austria Wien	Free
22 December 2003	DF	(Sweden)	Marcus Andreasson	(Norway) Bryne	Unknown
22 December 2003	DF	(Norway)	Martin Høyem	(Norway) Rosenborg	Unknown
10 February 2004	GK	(Norway)	Lars Ivar Moldskred	(Norway) Hødd	Unknown
25 August 2004	DF	(Finland)	Toni Kallio	(Finland) HJK Helsinki	Unknown

=== Out ===
Date	Position	Nationality	Name	To	Fee
14 November 2003	DF	(Sweden)	Tobias Carlsson	(Sweden) Kalmar	Free
17 November 2003	DF	(Norway)	Petter Christian Singsaas	(Norway) Steinkjer	Free
1 December 2003	MF	(Sweden)	Fredrik Gustafson	(Sweden) Öster	Unknown
1 December 2003	MF	(Iceland)	Olafur Stigsson		Resigned
1 January 2004	MF	(Norway)	Daniel Berg Hestad	(Netherlands) Heerenveen	Free
	DF	(Iceland)	Bjarni Þorsteinsson	(Iceland) KR Reykjavik	Unknown
	FW	(Iceland)	Andri Sigþórsson	Retired	
5 July 2004	DF	(Sweden)	David Ljung	(Sweden) Helsingborg	Unknown
29 July 2004	MF	(Norway)	Magne Hoseth	(Denmark) Copenhagen	Unknown

=== Loans in ===
Date from	Date to	Position	Nationality	Name	From

=== Loans out ===
Date from	Date to	Position	Nationality	Name	To
March 2004	Summer 2004	GK	(Norway)	Lars Ivar Moldskred	(Norway) Hødd
25 August 2004	End of season	GK	(Norway)	Knut Dørum Lillebakk	(Norway) Hødd

== Competitions ==
=== Tippeligaen ===
==== Results summary ====
Overall								Home						Away					
Pld	W	D	L	GF	GA	GD	Pts	W	D	L	GF	GA	GD	W	D	L	GF	GA	GD
26	7	10	9	34	37	−3	31	4	6	3	19	14	+5	3	4	6	15	23	−8

Last updated: 16 April 2018.

==== Results by round ====
Round	1	2	3	4	5	6	7	8	9	10	11	12	13	14	15	16	17	18	19	20	21	22	23	24	25	26
Ground	H	A	H	A	H	A	A	H	A	H	A	H	A	A	H	A	H	A	H	H	A	H	A	H	A	H
Result	W	L	L	D	D	W	L	D	D	D	L	W	D	W	L	L	D	D	L	D	L	W	L	D	W	W
Position	2	8	9	10	9	7	8	11	10	10	10	10	10	9	9	10	10	10	10	12	13	12	12	13	11	11

Source: see below
A = Away; H = Home; W = Win; D = Draw; L = Loss

==== Results ====
12 April 2004 1	Molde	2 – 0	Lyn	Molde
18:00 CET (UTC+1)	Rudi 16'; Hoås (yellow card) 40'; Hoseth (yellow card) 58'; Strande (yellow card) 66'; Andreasson 87'	Report	Lustü (yellow card) 48'; Onstad (yellow card) 50'	Stadium: Molde Stadion; Attendance: 6,079; Referee: Kjell Alseth, Stjørdals-Blink

18 April 2004 2	Brann	3 – 0	Molde	Bergen
19:00 CET (UTC+1)	Dylan Macallister 4', 10'; Haugen (yellow card) 6'; Olofinjana 82'	Report		Stadium: Brann Stadion; Attendance: 15,318; Referee: Roy Helge Olsen, Flekkerøy

25 April 2004 3	Molde	0 – 1	Fredrikstad	Molde
18:00 CET (UTC+1)	Andreasson (yellow card) 68'; Hoseth (yellow card) 80'	Report	Helland 27'; Risholt (yellow card) 70'; Koskela (yellow card) 84'	Stadium: Molde Stadion; Attendance: 4,920; Referee: Kjetil Sælen, Arna-Bjørnar

1 May 2004 4	Viking	1 – 1	Molde	Stavanger
16:00 CET (UTC+1)	Timm 31'	Report	Hulsker (yellow card) 27', (goal) 70'	Stadium: Viking Stadion; Attendance: 15,300; Referee: Terje Hauge, Hordaland

9 May 2004 5	Molde	2 – 2	Lillestrøm	Molde
18:00 CET (UTC+1)	Mork (yellow card) 17'; Stavrum; 27' Hoseth 79'	Report	Andresen 2', (yellow card) 29'; Koren (yellow card) 23'; Kippe 36'	Stadium: Molde Stadion; Attendance: 5,022; Referee: Per Ivar Staberg, Malmefjorden

16 May 2004 6	Rosenborg	0 – 2	Molde	Trondheim
18:00 CET (UTC+1)	Berg (yellow card) 12'; Brattbakk (yellow card) 23'; Riseth (yellow card) 54'; Enerly (yellow card) 89'	Report	Strande (yellow card) 41'; Røberg 45'; Hoseth 49'	Stadium: Lerkendal Stadion; Attendance: 21,366; Referee: Tommy Skjerven, Kaupanger

20 May 2004 7	Tromsø	2 – 1	Molde	Tromsø
18:00 CET (UTC+1)	Årst 4'; Strand 12'; Borch (yellow card) 31'; Bjørn Johansen (yellow card) 34'	Report	Hoseth 32' (pen.), (yellow card) 54'; Andreasson (yellow card) 37'; Høyem (yellow card) 64'	Stadium: Alfheim Stadion; Attendance: 6,802; Referee: Stig Rune Krokdal, Nessegutten

24 May 2004 8	Molde	1 – 1	Vålerenga	Molde
19:00 CET (UTC+1)	Hulsker 33', (yellow card) 39'; Høyem (yellow card) 67'	Report	dos Santos 43' (pen.); Gashi (yellow card) 70'; Holm (yellow card) 81'	Stadium: Molde Stadion; Attendance: 4,920; Referee: Svein Oddvar Moen, Haugar

1 June 2004 9	Odd Grenland	1 – 1	Molde	Skien
19:00 CET (UTC+1)	Aas (yellow card) 11'; Olsen (red card) 61'; Henriksson 66'	Report	Råket 9'; Andreasson (yellow card) 26'; Røberg (yellow card) 33'	Stadium: Odd Stadion; Attendance: 4,750; Referee: Tom Henning Øvrebø, Nordstrand

6 June 2004 10	Molde	1 – 1	Sogndal	Molde
18:00 CET (UTC+1)	Hoås 89'	Report	Russell 36'; Nyan (yellow card) 66'; Bolseth (yellow card) 86'	Stadium: Molde Stadion; Attendance: 5,059; Referee: Brage Sandmoen, Kjelsås

13 June 2004 11	HamKam	5 – 1	Molde	Hamar
18:00 CET (UTC+1)	Frigård 1', 26', 50'; Haug 35'; Storbæk 77'	Report	Hoseth (yellow card) 41'; Hoås 83'	Stadium: Briskeby Stadion; Attendance: 5,262; Referee: Roy Helge Olsen, Flekkerøy

20 June 2004 12	Molde	3 – 0	Stabæk	Molde
18:00 CET (UTC+1)	Strande (yellow card) 41'; Ljung 75'; Hasselgård 78'; Hulsker 90'	Report	Stenvoll (yellow card) 38'; Holter (yellow card) 82'	Stadium: Molde Stadion; Attendance: 4,187; Referee: Kim Rune Borgersen, Austad

27 June 2004 13	Bodø/Glimt	0 – 0	Molde	Bodø
18:00 CET (UTC+1)	Råstad (yellow card) 63'	Report	Ormbostad (yellow card) 15'; Kihlberg (yellow card) 65'	Stadium: Aspmyra Stadion; Attendance: 3,695; Referee: Per Ivar Staberg, Malmefjorden

4 July 2004 14	Lyn	1 – 2	Molde	Oslo
16:00 CET (UTC+1)	Sørensen 64'	Report	Hulsker (yellow card) 28'; Ljung 39'; Høyem (yellow card) 43'; Andreasson 66'	Stadium: Ullevaal Stadion; Attendance: 1,612; Referee: Svein Oddvar Moen, Haugar

25 July 2004 15	Molde	2 – 3	Brann	Molde
20:15 CET (UTC+1)	Strande 6'; Ormbostad (yellow card) 13'; Hoseth 29', (yellow card) 58'; Moldskred (yellow card) 63'	Report	Winters 14', 87'; Knudsen (yellow card) 64'; Kvisvik 90' (pen.), (yellow card) 90'	Stadium: Molde Stadion; Attendance: 5,019; Referee: Tommy Skjerven, Kaupanger

1 August 2004 16	Fredrikstad	2 – 1	Molde	Fredrikstad
18:00 CET (UTC+1)	Risholt 1'; Enerly 45'; Bora Zivkovic (yellow card) 60'; Söderstjerna (yellow card) 87'	Report	Mork 23'; Hasselgård (yellow card) 58'; Rudi (yellow card) 71'; Hulsker (yellow card) 83'	Stadium: Fredrikstad Stadion; Attendance: 6,495; Referee: Øyvind Alapnes, Finnsnes

9 August 2004 17	Molde	1 – 1	Viking	Molde
19:00 CET (UTC+1)	Rudi 35'	Report	Nevland 11'; Sørli (yellow card) 37'; Hansen (yellow card) 78'; Peter Kopteff (yellow card) 84'	Stadium: Molde Stadion; Attendance: 4,695; Referee: Terje Hauge, Hordaland

23 August 2004 18	Lillestrøm	1 – 1	Molde	Lillestrøm
19:00 CET (UTC+1)	Sundgot 63'; Kristoffersen (yellow card) 88'	Report	Mavric (yellow card) 27'; Hulsker 72'; Ramsli (yellow card) 85'	Stadium: Åråsen Stadion; Attendance: 5,241; Referee: Tom Henning Øvrebø, Nordstrand

29 August 2004 19	Molde	1 – 3	Rosenborg	Molde
18:00 CET (UTC+1)	Møster 19'; Rudi (yellow card) 65'	Report	Braaten 15', 90', (yellow card) 79'; Solli (yellow card) 71'; Riseth 84'	Stadium: Molde Stadion; Attendance: 9,142; Referee: Roy Helge Olsen, Flekkerøy

12 September 2004 20	Molde	1 – 1	Tromsø	Molde
18:00 CET (UTC+1)	Friend (yellow card) 36'; Hulsker (yellow card) 39'; Mavric 85'	Report	Yndestad 79'	Stadium: Molde Stadion; Attendance: 4,815; Referee: Kjetil Sælen, Arna-Bjørnar

19 September 2004 21	Vålerenga	4 – 1	Molde	Oslo
18:00 CET (UTC+1)	Kallio 32' (o.g.); Mavric 48' (o.g.); Gashi 52'; Iversen 68'	Report	Kallio 5'; Friend (yellow card) 62'	Stadium: Ullevaal Stadion; Attendance: 10,032; Referee: Roy Helge Olsen, Flekkerøy

26 September 2004 22	Molde	2 – 1	Odd Grenland	Molde
18:00 CET (UTC+1)	Hulsker (yellow card) 7'; Hasselgård 38'; Kallio 50'	Report	Rudi 86' (o.g.); Toresen (yellow card) 90'	Stadium: Molde Stadion; Attendance: 4,493; Referee: Brage Sandmoen, Kjelsås

3 October 2004 23	Sogndal	2 – 1	Molde	Sogndalsfjøra
18:00 CET (UTC+1)	Ødegaard 17', 44'	Report	Mork (yellow card) 39'; Mavric (red card) 45'; Friend (yellow card) 51', (goal) 68'	Stadium: Fosshaugane; Attendance: 1,411; Referee: Svein Oddvar Moen, Haugar

17 October 2004 24	Molde	0 – 0	HamKam	Molde
18:00 CET (UTC+1)	Andreasson (yellow card) 20'	Report	Frigård (yellow card) 20'; Smeets (yellow card) 24'	Stadium: Molde Stadion; Attendance: 5,075; Referee: Tom Henning Øvrebø, Nordstrand

24 October 2004 25	Stabæk	1 – 3	Molde	Bærum
18:00 CET (UTC+1)	Hauger 25'; Gunnarsson (yellow card) 89'; Muri (yellow card) 90'	Report	Mork 21', 40'; Rudi 60'	Stadium: Nadderud Stadion; Attendance: 4,775; Referee: Terje Hauge, Hordaland

30 October 2004 26	Molde	3 – 0	Bodø/Glimt	Molde
18:00 CET (UTC+1)	Husøy 57', (yellow card) 80'; Friend 72', (yellow card) 73'; Mork 81'	Report	Hansen (yellow card) 58'; Steinbakk (yellow card) 87'	Stadium: Molde Stadion; Attendance: 8,780; Referee: Kjell Alseth, Stjørdals-Blink

==== League table ====
Pos	Team	Pld	W	D	L	GF	GA	GD	Pts	Qualification or relegation
9	Viking	26	7	12	7	31	33	−2	33	Qualification for the UEFA Cup first qualifying round (Note: Viking qualified for the UEFA Cup first qualifying round through the UEFA Fair Play ranking award.)
10	Fredrikstad	26	9	5	12	42	54	−12	32	
11	Molde	26	7	10	9	34	37	−3	31	
12	Bodø/Glimt (O)	26	7	6	13	28	41	−13	27	Qualification for the relegation play-offs
13	Stabæk (R)	26	7	6	13	25	40	−15	27	Relegation to First Division

Source: fotball.no
Rules for classification: 1) points; 2) goal difference; 3) number of goals scored.
(O) Play-off winners; (R) Relegated

=== Norwegian Cup ===
5 May 2004 First Round	Flå	0 – 4	Molde	Ler
18:00 CEST (UTC+1)		Report	Hoås 44', 58', 83'; Husøy (yellow card) 51'; Stavrum 74'	Stadium: Flå Stadion; Attendance: 700; Referee: Dag Vidar Hafsås, Kolstad

27 May 2004 Second Round	Volda	0 – 5	Molde	Volda
18:00 CEST (UTC+2)		Report	Rudi 52'; Råket 63', 76'; Hoås 68'; Hulsker 80'	Stadium: Volda Stadion; Attendance: 474; Referee: Ole Bjørn Moen, Eide og Omegn

9 June 2004 Third Round	Molde	1 – 2 (a.e.t.)	Vard Haugesund	Molde
18:00 CEST (UTC+2)	Hasselgård 70'; Hoseth (yellow card) 117'	Report	Bygnes (yellow card) 71'; Thuestad 77'; Sønstabø (yellow card) 100'; Torstveit 105'	Stadium: Molde Stadion; Attendance: 587; Referee: Pål Jakobsen, Steinkjer

== Squad statistics ==
=== Appearances and goals ===
No.	Pos	Nat	Player	Total		Tippeligaen		Norwegian Cup	
No.	Pos	Nat	Player	Apps	Goals	Apps	Goals	Apps	Goals
1	GK	(Sweden) SWE	Eddie Gustafsson	23	0	23	0	0	0
2	DF	(Norway) NOR	Martin Høyem	18	0	12+3	0	3	0
3	DF	(Sweden) SWE	Marcus Andreasson	28	2	25	2	3	0
4	DF	(Finland) FIN	Toni Kallio	7	2	7	2	0	0
5	DF	(Norway) NOR	Øyvind Gjerde	4	0	0+2	0	1+1	0
7	MF	(Norway) NOR	Thomas Mork	22	4	20	4	1+1	0
8	FW	(Norway) NOR	Arild Stavrum	19	2	7+10	1	2	1
9	FW	(Norway) NOR	Bernt Hulsker	24	5	16+5	4	3	1
11	MF	(Sweden) SWE	Magnus Kihlberg	19	0	17+2	0	0	0
13	FW	(Norway) NOR	Øyvind Hoås	20	6	7+10	2	2+1	4
14	MF	(Norway) NOR	John Andreas Husøy	11	1	5+5	1	1	0
15	MF	(Norway) NOR	Petter Rudi	29	4	26	3	3	1
16	DF	(Norway) NOR	Erlend Ormbostad	17	0	13+2	0	1+1	0
17	DF	(Norway) NOR	Trond Strande	16	1	16	1	0	0
18	FW	(Norway) NOR	Stig Arild Råket	19	3	7+9	1	3	2
19	MF	(Norway) NOR	Anders Hasselgård	18	3	13+4	2	0+1	1
20	FW	(Norway) NOR	Kai Røberg	22	1	11+8	1	3	0
21	DF	(Norway) NOR	Knut Olav Rindarøy	5	0	3+2	0	0	0
22	GK	(Norway) NOR	Lars Ivar Moldskred	1	0	1	0	0	0
23	MF	(Norway) NOR	Peter Berg Hestad	1	0	0	0	0+1	0
23	MF	(Norway) NOR	Torgeir Ruud Ramsli	6	0	4+2	0	0	0
24	DF	(Slovenia) SVN	Matej Mavric	7	1	7	1	0	0
25	MF	(Slovenia) SVN	Mitja Brulc	5	0	2+3	0	0	0
26	FW	(Canada) CAN	Rob Friend	6	2	5+1	2	0	0
27	MF	(Norway) NOR	Tommy Eide Møster	14	1	9+5	1	0	0
Players away from Molde on loan:
12	GK	(Norway) NOR	Knut Dørum Lillebakk	5	0	2	0	3	0
Players who left Molde during the season:
4	DF	(Sweden) SWE	David Ljung	17	2	14	2	2+1	0
10	MF	(Norway) NOR	Magne Hoseth	15	4	14	4	1	0
26	DF	(Norway) NOR	Joar Harøy	1	0	0	0	0+1	0

=== Goal Scorers ===
Rank	Position	Nat.	No.	Player	Tippeligaen	Norwegian Cup	Total
1	FW	(Norway)	13	Øyvind Hoås	2	4	6
2	FW	(Norway)	9	Bernt Hulsker	4	1	5
3	MF	(Norway)	10	Magne Hoseth	4	0	4
3	MF	(Norway)	7	Thomas Mork	4	0	4
3	MF	(Norway)	15	Petter Rudi	3	1	4
6	MF	(Norway)	19	Anders Hasselgård	2	1	3
6	FW	(Norway)	18	Stig Arild Råket	1	2	3
8	FW	(Canada)	26	Rob Friend	2	0	2
8	DF	(Sweden)	3	Marcus Andreasson	2	0	2
8	DF	(Sweden)	4	David Ljung	2	0	2
8	DF	(Finland)	4	Toni Kallio	2	0	2
8	FW	(Norway)	8	Arild Stavrum	1	1	2
13	MF	(Norway)	14	John Andreas Husøy	1	0	1
13	DF	(Norway)	17	Trond Strande	1	0	1
13	FW	(Norway)	20	Kai Røberg	1	0	1
13	DF	(Slovenia)	24	Matej Mavric	1	0	1
13	MF	(Norway)	11	Tommy Eide Møster	1	0	1
				TOTALS	34	10	44

== See also ==
- Molde FK seasons
