= 2003 Molde FK season =

Molde
2003 season
- Chairman: Oddne Hansen
- Head coach: Gunder Bengtsson (until 22 May 2003); Odd Berg (from 22 May 2003)
- Stadium: Molde Stadion
- Tippeligaen: 9th
- Norwegian Cup: Third Round vs. Skeid
- UEFA Cup: Second Round vs. Benfica
- Top goalscorer: League: Magne Hoseth (11); All: Magne Hoseth (14)
- Highest home attendance: 11,167 vs Aalesund (22 June 2003)
- Lowest home attendance: 788 vs Skeid (25 June 2003)
- Average home league attendance: 5,945

The 2003 season was Molde's 28th season in the top flight of Norwegian football. In Tippeligaen they finished in 9th position.

Molde participated in the Norwegian Cup. On 25 June 2003, Molde was defeated 0-1 at home by Skeid in the third round.

== Squad ==
Note: Flags indicate national team as defined under FIFA eligibility rules; some limited exceptions apply. Players may hold more than one non-FIFA nationality.

No.	Pos.	Nation	Player
1	GK	FRO	Jákup Mikkelsen
2	DF	ISL	Bjarni Þorsteinsson
3	DF	NOR	Petter Christian Singsaas
4	DF	SWE	David Ljung
5	MF	ISL	Ólafur Stígsson
6	MF	NOR	Daniel Berg Hestad (Captain)
7	MF	NOR	Thomas Mork
8	FW	NOR	Arild Stavrum
9	FW	NOR	Bernt Hulsker
10	MF	NOR	Magne Hoseth
11	MF	SWE	Magnus Kihlberg
12	GK	SWE	Eddie Gustafsson
13	DF	SWE	Tobias Carlsson
14	MF	SWE	Fredrik Gustafson

No.	Pos.	Nation	Player
15	FW	ISL	Andri Sigthórsson
16	DF	NOR	Erlend Ormbostad
17	DF	NOR	Trond Strande
18	FW	NOR	Stig Arild Råket
19	MF	NOR	Anders Hasselgård
20	FW	NOR	Kai Røberg
21	DF	NOR	Per Olav Inderhaug
22	GK	NOR	Knut Dørum Lillebakk
23	DF	NOR	Martin Høyem (on loan from Rosenborg)
40	FW	NOR	Øyvind Hoås
41	MF	NOR	John Andreas Husøy
42	MF	NOR	Tommy Eide Møster
44	DF	NOR	Anders Særvold

As of end of season.

== Competitions ==
=== Tippeligaen ===
==== Results summary ====
Overall								Home						Away					
Pld	W	D	L	GF	GA	GD	Pts	W	D	L	GF	GA	GD	W	D	L	GF	GA	GD
26	9	4	13	32	41	−9	31	6	2	5	21	16	+5	3	2	8	11	25	−14

Last updated: 16 April 2018.

==== Results by round ====
Round	1	2	3	4	5	6	7	8	9	10	11	12	13	14	15	16	17	18	19	20	21	22	23	24	25	26
Ground	A	H	A	H	H	A	H	A	H	A	H	A	H	H	A	H	A	A	H	A	H	A	H	A	H	A
Result	L	W	L	D	D	L	W	L	W	L	L	W	W	L	L	L	W	D	W	L	W	L	L	D	L	W
Position	11	5	8	7	8	10	8	11	9	10	11	9	7	9	10	11	9	10	9	9	8	9	9	10	11	9

Source: see below
A = Away; H = Home; W = Win; D = Draw; L = Loss

==== Results ====
13 April 2003 1	Odd Grenland	1 – 0	Molde	Skien
18:00 CET (UTC+1)	Solli (yellow card) 37' van Ankeren 51'; Flindt Bjerg (yellow card) 60'	Report	Kihlberg (yellow card) 68'	Stadium: Odd Stadion; Attendance: 6,366; Referee: Brage Sandmoen, Kjelsås

21 April 2003 2	Molde	4 – 0	Lillestrøm	Molde
18:00 CET (UTC+1)	Hoseth 8', 15' (pen.), 34' (pen.); Hestad 71'; Hulsker (yellow card) 90'	Report	Bjarmann (yellow card) 51'; Wehrman (red card) 90'	Stadium: Molde Stadion; Attendance: 6,302; Referee: Terje Hauge, Hordaland

26 April 2003 3	Bodø/Glimt	2 – 0	Molde	Bodø
19:00 CET (UTC+1)	Berg 6'; Kjølner 71'	Report		Stadium: Aspmyra Stadion; Attendance: 4,375; Referee: Roy Helge Olsen, Flekkerøy

4 May 2003 4	Molde	2 – 2	Lyn	Molde
21:00 CET (UTC+1)	Hoseth (yellow card) 12', (goal) 56'; Gustafson (yellow card) 34'; Hasselgård 47'; Hulsker (yellow card) 54'; Stígsson (yellow card) 61'	Report	Berntsen (yellow card) 24'; Augustsson 75'; Sokolowski 81'; Lustü (yellow card) 90'	Stadium: Molde Stadion; Attendance: 3,822; Referee: Jonny Ditlefsen, Mo

11 May 2003 5	Molde	0 – 0	Stabæk	Molde
20:00 CET (UTC+1)	Mork (yellow card) 21'; Singsaas (yellow card) 23'; Hulsker (yellow card) 25'	Report	Holter (yellow card) 45'	Stadium: Molde Stadion; Attendance: 4,080; Referee: Jon Eilif Skjervold, Fet

16 May 2003 6	Bryne	3 – 0	Molde	Bryne
18:00 CET (UTC+1)	Pavlovic 19'; Hellesund 39'; Hjelmhaug 70' (pen.)	Report	Ljung (yellow card) 69'	Stadium: Bryne Stadion; Attendance: 3,965; Referee: Terje Hauge, Hordaland

25 May 2003 7	Molde	2 – 1	Tromsø	Molde
18:00 CET (UTC+1)	Strande 8'; Mork 43'	Report	Hafstad 70' (pen.); Yndestad (yellow card) 71'	Stadium: Molde Stadion; Attendance: 6,355; Referee: Brage Sandmoen, Kjelsås

29 May 2003 8	Vålerenga	2 – 0	Molde	Oslo
20:00 CET (UTC+1)	dos Santos 38'; Kah 51'	Report		Stadium: Ullevaal Stadion; Attendance: 7,531; Referee: Kjell Alseth, Stjørdals-Blink

2 June 2003 9	Molde	3 – 0	Brann	Molde
19:00 CET (UTC+1)	Hasselgård 18', 50'; Hestad 25'	Report	Haugen (yellow card) 56'; Ulfstein (yellow card) 63'	Stadium: Molde Stadion; Attendance: 5,508; Referee: Espen Berntsen, Fart

14 June 2003 10	Rosenborg	5 – 0	Molde	Trondheim
19:05 CET (UTC+1)	Johnsen (yellow card) 9'; Brattbakk 25', 28' (pen.); Johnsen 45', 57'; Storflor 79'	Report		Stadium: Lerkendal Stadion; Attendance: 16,760; Referee: Rune Pedersen, Sprint/Jeløy

22 June 2003 11	Molde	2 – 3	Aalesund	Molde
18:00 CET (UTC+1)	Ljung 27'; Hoseth (yellow card) 65'; Hestad 90'	Report	Moldskred 14'; Aarøy 15'; Steen (yellow card) 40'; Melland (yellow card) 57'; Gjerde 90+5'	Stadium: Molde Stadion; Attendance: 11,167; Referee: Kjell Alseth, Stjørdals-Blink

30 June 2003 12	Viking	v	Molde	Stavanger
18:00 CET (UTC+1)				Stadium: Stavanger Stadion; Referee: Espen Berntsen, Vang
Note: The match was postponed due to heavy rain.

19 July 2003 13	Molde	3 – 1	Sogndal	Molde
16:00 CET (UTC+1)	Hulsker 67'; Hoseth 71'; Hestad 89'	Report	Stadheim (yellow card) 17'; Kouakou (red card) 77'; Kalvenes 79'	Stadium: Molde Stadion; Attendance: 7,665; Referee: Roy Helge Olsen, Flekkerøy

27 July 2003 14	Molde	0 – 1	Odd Grenland	Molde
18:00 CET (UTC+1)	Strande (yellow card) 25'	Report	Røed 7'; Hoff (yellow card) 89'	Stadium: Molde Stadion; Attendance: 5,574; Referee: Tom Henning Øvrebø, Nordstrand

30 July 2003 12	Viking	1 – 2	Molde	Stavanger
18:00 CET (UTC+1)	Hangeland 2'; Sørli (yellow card) 28'	Report	Kihlberg 20', (yellow card) 90'; Hulsker 38'; Stavrum (yellow card) 47'	Stadium: Stavanger Stadion; Attendance: 6,290; Referee: Espen Berntsen, Vang

3 August 2003 15	Lillestrøm	3 – 0	Molde	Lillestrøm
18:00 CET (UTC+1)	Kippe 41'; Bjarmann 46'; Sundgot 67'	Report	Strande (yellow card) 32'; Carlsson (yellow card) 45'; Kihlberg (yellow card) 63'	Stadium: Åråsen Stadion; Attendance: 5,322; Referee: Kjell Alseth, Stjørdals-Blink

11 August 2003 16	Molde	0 – 2	Bodø/Glimt	Molde
19:00 CET (UTC+1)	Gustafson (yellow card) 44'; Hulsker (yellow card) 81'	Report	Sannes 39', (yellow card) 41'; Paulsen (yellow card) 56'; Bjørkan 72'	Stadium: Molde Stadion; Attendance: 4,880; Referee: Terje Hauge, Hordaland

17 August 2003 17	Lyn	0 – 2	Molde	Oslo
18:00 CET (UTC+1)	Hansen (yellow card) 67'; Onstad (yellow card) 86'	Report	Hoseth 61' (pen.), 90'	Stadium: Ullevaal Stadion; Attendance: 2,408; Referee: Kjell Alseth, Stjørdals-Blink

24 August 2003 18	Stabæk	1 – 1	Molde	Bærum
18:00 CET (UTC+1)	Olsen 90'	Report	Singsaas (yellow card) 5'; Ljung 45'	Stadium: Nadderud Stadion; Attendance: 3,535; Referee: Roy Helge Olsen, Flekkerøy

31 August 2003 19	Molde	3 – 2	Bryne	Molde
18:00 CET (UTC+1)	Hestad 18'; Gustafson 34'; Singsaas (yellow card) 51'; Hulsker 84'; Strande (yellow card) 90'	Report	Braut (yellow card) 45'; Andreasson 61'; Hornseth 70'	Stadium: Molde Stadion; Attendance: 4,450; Referee: Espen Berntsen, Vang

14 September 2003 20	Tromsø	1 – 0	Molde	Tromsø
16:00 CET (UTC+1)	Koppinen (yellow card) 41'; Årst 90'	Report	Stígsson (red card) 62'; Hulsker (yellow card) 83'; Hoseth (yellow card) 90'; Hestad (red card) 90'	Stadium: Alfheim Stadion; Attendance: 3,291; Referee: Tom Henning Øvrebø, Nordstrand

21 September 2003 21	Molde	1 – 0	Vålerenga	Molde
16:00 CET (UTC+1)	Røberg 13'; Gustafsson (yellow card) 71'	Report	Rekdal (yellow card) 7'; Jalland (yellow card) 53'; Berre (yellow card) 57'; Hanssen (yellow card) 67'; Hovi (yellow card) 90'	Stadium: Molde Stadion; Attendance: 5,219; Referee: Stig Rune Krokdal, Nessegutten

28 September 2003 22	Brann	3 – 2	Molde	Bergen
19:00 CET (UTC+1)	Kvisvik (yellow card) 39'; Winters 41', 73'; Olofinjana 52'	Report	Hoseth 24'; Carlsson 38'; Singsaas (yellow card) 39'	Stadium: Brann Stadion; Attendance: 9,180; Referee: Tommy Skjerven, Kaupanger

5 October 2003 23	Molde	0 – 2	Rosenborg	Molde
16:00 CET (UTC+1)	Strande (yellow card) 77'; Kihlberg (yellow card) 85'	Report	Johnsen 66'; Singsaas 71' (o.g.); Karadas (red card) 77'	Stadium: Molde Stadion; Attendance: 7,563; Referee: Espen Berntsen, Vang

18 October 2003 24	Aalesund	1 – 1	Molde	Ålesund
15:00 CET (UTC+1)	Hoseth (yellow card) 54'; Fagermo 78' (pen.)	Report	Kihlberg (yellow card) 50'; Strande 90'	Stadium: Kråmyra Stadion; Attendance: 9,667; Referee: Terje Hauge, Hordaland

27 October 2003 25	Molde	1 – 2	Viking	Molde
19:00 CET (UTC+1)	Hoseth 54'; Råket (yellow card) 90'	Report	Dahl (yellow card) 40'; Aarsheim (yellow card) 47'; Sanne 50', 67'	Stadium: Molde Stadion; Attendance: 4,695; Referee: Tommy Skjerven, Kaupanger

1 November 2003 26	Sogndal	2 – 3	Molde	Sogndalsfjøra
13:00 CET (UTC+1)	Johansen (yellow card) 28'; Ødegaard (yellow card) 34'; Flo 89', 90' (pen.)	Report	Ljung 3'; Hoseth 28' (pen.), 45'; Kihlberg (yellow card) 40'; Råket (yellow card) 78'; Trond Strande (yellow card) 90'	Stadium: Fosshaugane; Attendance: 2,203; Referee: Brage Sandmoen, Kjelsås

==== League table ====
Pos	Team	Pld	W	D	L	GF	GA	GD	Pts
7	Lillestrøm	26	10	7	9	33	35	−2	37
8	Sogndal	26	9	8	9	43	46	−3	35
9	Molde	26	9	4	13	32	41	−9	31
10	Lyn	26	8	6	12	34	45	−11	30
11	Tromsø	26	8	5	13	30	52	−22	29

Source: fotball.no
Rules for classification: 1) points; 2) goal difference; 3) number of goals scored.

=== Norwegian Cup ===
7 May 2003 First Round	Hamar	0 – 6	Molde	Hamar
18:00 CEST (UTC+1)		Report	Hulsker 16', 24', 44', 76'; Mork 27'; Hasselgård 66'	Attendance: 270; Referee: Tom Harald Hagen, Grue

13 May 2003 Second Round	Averøykameratene	0 – 3	Molde	Bruhagen, Averøy Municipality
18:00 CEST (UTC+2)	Kvarsvik (yellow card) 35'; Hatle (yellow card) 62'	Report	Råket 5'; Hoseth (yellow card) 22'; Hoås 61'; Stigsson (yellow card) 70'; Røberg 85'	Stadium: Bruhaugen Stadion; Attendance: 690; Referee: Helge Roar Åndal, Molde

25 June 2003 Third Round	Molde	0 – 1	Skeid	Molde
18:00 CEST (UTC+2)	Ljung (yellow card) 85'	Report	Noppi 32'; Anders Jacobsen (yellow card) 58'	Stadium: Molde Stadion; Attendance: 788; Referee: Stig Rune Krokdal, Orkanger

=== UEFA Cup ===
==== Qualifying round ====
14 August 2003 Qualifying round 1st leg	Molde (Norway)	2 – 0	(Faroe Islands) KÍ Klaksvík	Molde
??:?? CET (UTC+1)	Hoseth (yellow card) 26' (goal) 35' (pen.); Ljung 37'; Hulsker (yellow card) 64'; Gustafson (yellow card) 71'	Summary	Bertholdsen (yellow card) 31'; Nysted (yellow card) 34'; Klakkstein (yellow card) 57'; Joensen (yellow card) 90+2'	Stadium: Molde Stadion

28 August 2003 Qualifying round 2nd leg	KÍ Klaksvík (Faroe Islands)	0 – 4 (0 – 6 agg.)	(Norway) Molde	Klaksvík
??:?? CET (UTC+1)	Djordjevic (yellow card) 50'; Andreasen (yellow card) 85'; Al. Joensen (yellow card) 87'; Ar. Joensen (yellow card) 90+4'	Report	Hestad 28'; Gustafson 35'; Hoseth (yellow card) 64'; Hulsker 75'; Ljung 89'	Stadium: Djúpumýra Stadium

==== First round ====
24 September 2003 First round 1st leg	União de Leiria (Portugal)	1 – 0	(Norway) Molde	Leiria
??:?? CET (UTC+1)	Caíco 56'; Fredy (yellow card) 84'	Summary	Carlsson (yellow card) 19'	Stadium: Estádio Dr. Magalhães Pessoa

15 October 2003 First round 2nd leg	Molde (Norway)	3 – 1 (3 – 2 agg.)	(Portugal) União de Leiria	Molde
??:?? CET (UTC+1)	Hoseth 35' (pen.), 78' (pen.) (yellow card) 64'; Hestad 51' (yellow card) 66'	Summary	Maciel 58'; Gomes (yellow card) 64'; Peixe (yellow card) 73'; Douala (yellow card) 75'; Manuel (yellow card) 78'	Stadium: Molde Stadion

==== Second round ====
6 November 2003 Second round 1st leg	Benfica (Portugal)	3 – 1	(Norway) Molde	Lisbon
??:?? CET (UTC+1)	Gomes 20', 54'; Miguel (yellow card) 59'; Geovanni 51'	Summary	Mork (yellow card) 59'; Hestad 76'; Hulsker (yellow card) 77'	Stadium: Estádio da Luz; Attendance: 35,000; Referee: Herman Albrecht, Germany

27 November 2003 Second round 2nd leg	Molde (Norway)	0 – 2 (1 – 5 agg.)	(Portugal) Benfica	Molde
??:?? CET (UTC+1)	Hoseth (yellow card) 38'	Summary	Tiago 30', 42'; Rocha (yellow card) 80'	Stadium: Molde Stadion; Attendance: 4,181; Referee: Andy D'Urso, England

== Squad statistics ==
=== Appearances and goals ===
No.	Pos	Nat	Player	Total		Tippeligaen		Norwegian Cup		UEFA Cup	
No.	Pos	Nat	Player	Apps	Goals	Apps	Goals	Apps	Goals	Apps	Goals
2	DF	(Iceland) ISL	Bjarni Þorsteinsson	23	0	16+2	0	1	0	4	0
3	DF	(Norway) NOR	Petter Christian Singsaas	21	0	12+1	0	3	0	5	0
4	DF	(Sweden) SWE	David Ljung	35	5	26	3	3	0	6	2
5	MF	(Iceland) ISL	Ólafur Stígsson	18	0	8+5	0	2	0	2+1	0
6	MF	(Norway) NOR	Daniel Berg Hestad	29	8	20+1	5	2	0	6	3
7	MF	(Norway) NOR	Thomas Mork	31	2	21+1	1	3	1	6	0
8	FW	(Norway) NOR	Arild Stavrum	12	1	4+6	0	0	0	0+2	1
9	FW	(Norway) NOR	Bernt Hulsker	29	7	13+10	3	1	4	2+3	0
10	MF	(Norway) NOR	Magne Hoseth	32	14	23+1	11	3	0	5	3
11	MF	(Sweden) SWE	Magnus Kihlberg	33	1	24	1	2+1	0	5+1	0
12	GK	(Sweden) SWE	Eddie Gustafsson	30	0	23	0	3	0	4	0
13	DF	(Sweden) SWE	Tobias Carlsson	29	1	22	1	2+1	0	3+1	0
14	MF	(Sweden) SWE	Fredrik Gustafson	31	2	23+2	1	1+1	0	4	1
15	FW	(Iceland) ISL	Andri Sigthorsson	1	0	1	0	0	0	0	0
16	DF	(Norway) NOR	Erlend Ormbostad	13	0	4+5	0	2+1	0	0+1	0
17	DF	(Norway) NOR	Trond Strande	23	2	17	2	1	0	5	0
18	FW	(Norway) NOR	Stig Arild Råket	22	1	3+12	0	1+2	1	2+2	0
19	MF	(Norway) NOR	Anders Hasselgård	32	4	19+6	3	3	1	3+1	0
20	FW	(Norway) NOR	Kai Røberg	15	2	2+8	1	0+2	1	1+2	0
22	GK	(Norway) NOR	Knut Dørum Lillebakk	6	0	3+1	0	0	0	2	0
23	DF	(Norway) NOR	Martin Høyem	1	0	0	0	0	0	0+1	0
40	FW	(Norway) NOR	Øyvind Hoås	6	1	1+3	0	0+1	1	1	0
41	MF	(Norway) NOR	John Andreas Husøy	5	0	1+2	0	0	0	0+2	0
42	MF	(Norway) NOR	Tommy Eide Møster	1	0	0+1	0	0	0	0	0
44	DF	(Norway) NOR	Anders Særvold	1	0	0+1	0	0	0	0	0
Players away from Molde on loan:
Players who left Molde during the season:

=== Goal Scorers ===
Rank	Position	Nat.	No.	Player	Tippeligaen	Norwegian Cup	UEFA Cup	Total
1	MF	(Norway)	10	Magne Hoseth	11	0	3	14
2	MF	(Norway)	6	Daniel Berg Hestad	5	0	3	8
3	FW	(Norway)	9	Bernt Hulsker	3	4	0	7
4	DF	(Sweden)	4	David Ljung	3	0	2	5
5	MF	(Norway)	19	Anders Hasselgård	3	1	0	4
6	DF	(Norway)	17	Trond Strande	2	0	0	2
6	MF	(Norway)	7	Thomas Mork	1	1	0	2
6	FW	(Norway)	20	Kai Røberg	1	1	0	2
6	MF	(Sweden)	14	Fredrik Gustafson	1	0	1	2
10	MF	(Sweden)	11	Magnus Kihlberg	1	0	0	1
10	DF	(Sweden)	13	Tobias Carlsson	1	0	0	1
10	FW	(Norway)	18	Stig Arild Råket	0	1	0	1
10	FW	(Norway)	40	Øyvind Hoås	0	1	0	1
10	FW	(Norway)	8	Arild Stavrum	0	0	1	1
				TOTALS	32	9	10	51

== See also ==
- Molde FK seasons
