= 2002 Molde FK season =

Molde
2002 season
- Head coach: Gunder Bengtsson
- Stadium: Molde Stadion
- Tippeligaen: 2nd
- Norwegian Cup: Third Round vs. Hødd
- Top goalscorer: League: Bernt Hulsker (9); André Schei Lindbæk (9); All: Bernt Hulsker (11); André Schei Lindbæk (11)
- Highest home attendance: 11,167 vs Rosenborg (17 August 2002)
- Lowest home attendance: 513 vs Træff (12 June 2002)
- Average home league attendance: 6,193

The 2002 season was Molde's 27th season in the top flight of Norwegian football. In Tippeligaen they finished in 2nd position, six points behind Rosenborg.

Molde participated in the Norwegian Cup. On 26 June 2002, Molde was defeated 0-1 at away ground by Hødd in the third round.

== Squad ==
Note: Flags indicate national team as defined under FIFA eligibility rules; some limited exceptions apply. Players may hold more than one non-FIFA nationality.

No.	Pos.	Nation	Player
1	GK	FRO	Jákup Mikkelsen
2	DF	NOR	Roger Nilsen
3	DF	NOR	Petter Christian Singsaas
4	DF	SWE	David Ljung
5	DF	NOR	Knut Anders Fostervold
6	MF	NOR	Daniel Berg Hestad (Captain)
7	MF	NOR	Thomas Mork
8	MF	NOR	Karl Oskar Fjørtoft
9	FW	NOR	Bernt Hulsker
10	MF	NOR	Magne Hoseth
11	MF	NOR	André Schei Lindbæk
12	GK	SWE	Eddie Gustafsson
13	DF	SWE	Tobias Carlsson
14	MF	SWE	Fredrik Gustafson

No.	Pos.	Nation	Player
15	FW	ISL	Andri Sigthórsson
16	MF	NOR	Svein Tore Brandshaug
17	DF	NOR	Trond Strande
18	FW	NOR	Stig Arild Råket
19	MF	NOR	Anders Hasselgård
21	DF	ISL	Bjarni Þorsteinsson
22	GK	NOR	Knut Dørum Lillebakk
23	FW	NOR	Kai Røberg
24	DF	NOR	Erlend Ormbostad
25	DF	NOR	Per Olav Inderhaug
26	MF	ISL	Ólafur Stígsson
27	DF	NOR	Steinar Guvåg

As of end of season.

== Competitions ==
=== Tippeligaen ===
==== Results summary ====
Overall								Home						Away					
Pld	W	D	L	GF	GA	GD	Pts	W	D	L	GF	GA	GD	W	D	L	GF	GA	GD
26	15	5	6	48	26	+22	50	9	3	1	26	7	+19	6	2	5	22	19	+3

Last updated: 19 April 2018.

==== Results by round ====
Round	1	2	3	4	5	6	7	8	9	10	11	12	13	14	15	16	17	18	19	20	21	22	23	24	25	26
Ground	H	A	H	A	H	A	A	H	A	H	A	H	A	A	H	A	H	A	H	H	A	H	A	H	A	H
Result	W	D	W	L	D	L	W	W	W	W	W	W	L	L	D	D	W	W	L	W	W	W	W	W	L	D
Position	1	3	2	5	5	8	5	2	2	2	2	2	2	3	4	5	3	3	3	3	3	3	2	2	2	2

Source: see below
A = Away; H = Home; W = Win; D = Draw; L = Loss

==== Results ====
13 April 2002 1	Molde	2 – 0	Brann	Molde
19:00 CET (UTC+1)	Andri Sigthórsson 13'; Hasselgård 87'	Report		Stadium: Molde Stadion; Attendance: 6,204; Referee: Kjell Alseth, Stjørdals-Blink

21 April 2002 2	Odd Grenland	1 – 1	Molde	Skien
18:00 CET (UTC+1)	Røed 79'	Report	Strande 40'	Stadium: Odd Stadion; Attendance: 8,523; Referee: Roy Helge Olsen, Flekkerøy

28 April 2002 3	Molde	3 – 0	Viking	Molde
18:00 CET (UTC+1)	Sigthórsson 45'; Fostervold 53'; Hoseth (yellow card) 74'; Hulsker 90'	Report	Berre (yellow card) 51'; Sørli (yellow card) 70'	Stadium: Molde Stadion; Attendance: 5,236; Referee: Tom Henning Øvrebø, Nordstrand

1 May 2002 4	Lyn	3 – 1	Molde	Oslo
18:00 CET (UTC+1)	Swift 17', 54'; Augustsson (yellow card) 33'; Gudmundsson (yellow card) 87'; Birkeland 90'	Report	Hoseth 10'; Ljung (yellow card) 41'; Stígsson (yellow card) 59'	Stadium: Ullevaal Stadion; Attendance: 3,174; Referee: Kjell Alseth, Stjørdals-Blink

4 May 2002 5	Molde	0 – 0	Lillestrøm	Molde
19:00 CET (UTC+1)		Report	Kihlberg (yellow card) 32'	Stadium: Molde Stadion; Attendance: 5,055; Referee: Terje Hauge, Hordaland

9 May 2002 6	Rosenborg	3 – 0	Molde	Trondheim
20:00 CET (UTC+1)	George 29'; Berg 32'; Brattbakk 42'; Hoftun (yellow card) 63'	Report	Strande (yellow card) 51'	Stadium: Lerkendal Stadion; Attendance: 14,819; Referee: Tom Henning Øvrebø, Nordstrand

12 May 2002 7	Bryne	0 – 2	Molde	Bryne
18:00 CET (UTC+1)		Report	Hulsker 3'; Lindbæk 82'	Stadium: Bryne Stadion; Attendance: 3,013; Referee: Tommy Skjerven, Kaupanger

16 May 2002 8	Molde	5 – 1	Moss	Molde
18:00 CET (UTC+1)	Hestad 36'; Hulsker 60'; Sigthórsson 63', 77'; Fostervold 75'	Report	Storflor 30'; Høsøien (yellow card) 75'	Stadium: Molde Stadion; Attendance: 4,817; Referee: Kjell Alseth, Stjørdals-Blink

26 May 2002 9	Start	0 – 4	Molde	Kristiansand
18:00 CET (UTC+1)	Tauriainen (yellow card) 62'	Report	Hulsker (yellow card) 33'; Lindbæk 39' (pen.), 56'; Strande (yellow card) 40'; Stígsson (yellow card) 56'; Hestad 66'; Fjørtoft 86'	Stadium: Kristiansand Stadion; Attendance: 4,944; Referee: Espen Berntsen, Fart

2 June 2002 10	Molde	2 – 0	Vålerenga	Molde
18:00 CET (UTC+1)	Lindbæk 47', 55'	Report	Hagen (yellow card) 57'	Stadium: Molde Stadion; Attendance: 6,868; Referee: Roy Helge Olsen, Flekkerøy

9 June 2002 11	Bodø/Glimt	0 – 2	Molde	Bodø
18:00 CET (UTC+1)	Kjølner (yellow card) 90'	Report	Hasselgård (yellow card) 40'; Lindbæk 79'; Røberg 89'	Stadium: Aspmyra Stadion; Attendance: 2,909; Referee: Rune Pedersen, Sprint/Jeløy

16 June 2002 12	Molde	1 – 0	Stabæk	Molde
18:00 CET (UTC+1)	Fostervold (yellow card) 23'; Hulsker 64'	Report	Kjølø (yellow card) 83'	Stadium: Molde Stadion; Attendance: 7,810; Referee: Jonny Ditlefsen, Mo

23 June 2002 13	Sogndal	Postponned	Molde	Sogndalsfjøra
18:00 CET (UTC+1)				Stadium: Fosshaugane
Note: Postponed due to strike in Norwegian Players' Association (NISO).

30 June 2002 14	Brann	4 – 1	Molde	Bergen
18:00 CET (UTC+1)	Knarvik 27'; Knudsen 49'; Nhleko 54'; Solis 76'	Report	Hoseth 2' (pen.); Brandshaug (yellow card) 82'	Stadium: Brann Stadion; Attendance: 8,315; Referee: Tom Henning Øvrebø, Nordstrand

20 July 2002 15	Molde	0 – 0	Odd Grenland	Molde
16:00 CET (UTC+1)		Report	Bomhoff (yellow card) 8'; Flindt Bjerg (yellow card) 61'; Solli (yellow card) 87'	Stadium: Molde Stadion; Attendance: 8,137; Referee: Frode Kvam, Strindheim

28 July 2002 16	Viking	0 – 0	Molde	Stavanger
18:00 CET (UTC+1)		Report	Hasselgård (yellow card) 83'	Stadium: Stavanger Stadion; Attendance: 7,270; Referee: Terje Hauge, Hordaland

31 July 2002 13	Sogndal	2 – 1	Molde	Sogndalsfjøra
19:00 CET (UTC+1)	Flo 10'; Kalvenes (yellow card) 17'; Johansen 19'; Raoul Kouakou (red card) 32'	Report	Hulsker 14' (yellow card) 90'; Carlsson (yellow card) 71'	Stadium: Fosshaugane; Attendance: 1,780; Referee: Stig Rune Krokdal, Nessegutten

4 August 2002 17	Molde	2 – 0	Lyn	Molde
20:05 CET (UTC+1)	Lindbæk (yellow card) 20'; Råket 77', 87'	Report	Løvvik (yellow card) 45'	Stadium: Molde Stadion; Attendance: 4,902; Referee: Jon Eilif Skjervold, Fet

10 August 2002 18	Lillestrøm	0 – 2	Molde	Lillestrøm
19:05 CET (UTC+1)		Report	Mork 33'; Hoseth 43'	Stadium: Åråsen Stadion; Attendance: 4,319; Referee: Espen Berntsen, Fart

17 August 2002 19	Molde	1 – 2	Rosenborg	Molde
19:00 CET (UTC+1)	Thorsteinsson (yellow card) 56'; Mork 59'	Report	Brattbakk 26', (yellow card) 70'; Johnsen 30'	Stadium: Molde Stadion; Attendance: 11,167; Referee: Rune Pedersen, Sprint/Jeløy

25 August 2002 20	Molde	2 – 1	Bryne	Molde
18:00 CET (UTC+1)	Sirevåg 20' (o.g.); Hoseth 49' (pen.)	Report	Undheim 42', (yellow card) 69'	Stadium: Molde Stadion; Attendance: 4,303; Referee: Terje Hauge, Hordaland

1 September 2002 21	Moss	2 – 3	Molde	Moss
16:00 CET (UTC+1)	Tangen 5' (pen.); Kristiansen 23', (yellow card) 36'; Olsen (yellow card) 56'; Wehrman (yellow card) 62'	Report	Hoseth 11' (pen.), (yellow card) 57'; Hulsker 31', 47'; Hestad (yellow card) 62'	Stadium: Melløs Stadion; Attendance: 2,334; Referee: Frode Kvam, Strindheim

15 September 2002 22	Molde	2 – 0	Start	Molde
16:00 CET (UTC+1)	Strande (yellow card) 10'; Hulsker 45'; Carlsson 74'	Report	Sørensen (yellow card) 41'; Engedal (yellow card) 63'	Stadium: Molde Stadion; Attendance: 5,057; Referee: Bjørn Gravdal, Kolbotn

29 September 2002 23	Vålerenga	0 – 3	Molde	Oslo
16:00 CET (UTC+1)	Grahn (yellow card) 31'; Hovi (yellow card) 70'	Report	Hestad (yellow card) 27', (goal) 61'; Carlsson 45'; Lindbæk 50'	Stadium: Ullevaal Stadion; Attendance: 6,551; Referee: Tommy Skjerven, Kaupanger

6 October 2002 24	Molde	3 – 0	Bodø/Glimt	Molde
15:00 CET (UTC+1)	Lindbæk 32', 47'; Hoseth 67'	Report	Berg (yellow card) 40'	Stadium: Molde Stadion; Attendance: 6,105; Referee: Tom Henning Øvrebø, Nordstrand

20 October 2002 25	Stabæk	4 – 2	Molde	Bærum
14:00 CET (UTC+1)	Stenvoll 3'; Carlsson 5' (o.g.); Gudmundsson 42'; Wilhelmsson 84'	Report	Hoseth (yellow card) 7', (goal) 29'; Sigthórsson (yellow card) 84'; Hestad 90'	Stadium: Nadderud Stadion; Attendance: 3,362; Referee: Jonny Ditlefsen, Mo

27 October 2002 26	Molde	3 – 3	Sogndal	Molde
13:00 CET (UTC+1)	Mork (yellow card) 34'; Hulsker 58', (yellow card) 78'; Thorsteinsson 66'; Hasselgård 90'	Report	Flo 25'; Stadheim (yellow card) 40'; Kouakou (red card) 51'; Sørum (yellow card) 68'; Ødegaard (yellow card) 83'; Carlsson 89' (o.g.); Johansen 90'	Stadium: Molde Stadion; Attendance: 4,850; Referee: Stig Rune Krokdal, Nessegutten

==== League table ====
Pos	Team	Pld	W	D	L	GF	GA	GD	Pts	Qualification or relegation
1	Rosenborg (C)	26	17	5	4	57	30	+27	56	Qualification for the Champions League second qualifying round
2	Molde	26	15	5	6	48	26	+22	50	Qualification for the UEFA Cup qualifying round
3	Lyn	26	14	5	7	36	29	+7	47	Qualification for the UEFA Cup qualifying round
4	Viking	26	11	11	4	44	31	+13	44	
5	Stabæk	26	12	6	8	48	34	+14	42	

Source: fotball.no
Rules for classification: 1) points; 2) goal difference; 3) number of goals scored.
(C) Champions

=== Norwegian Cup ===
29 May 2002 First Round	Gossen	1 – 3	Molde	Gossen
19:00 CEST (UTC+1)	S. Vestavik (yellow card); K. Ø. Vassdal (yellow card); J. Varhaugvik 27'	Report	Lindbæk 47'; Hoseth 51'; Carlsson 58'	Stadium: Riksfjord Stadion; Referee: Ole Bjørn Moen, Eide og Omegn

12 June 2002 Second Round	Molde	7 – 0	Træff	Molde
18:00 CEST (UTC+2)	Kvarsvik (yellow card) 35'; Hatle (yellow card) 62'	Report	Hoseth 13', 72'; Lindbæk 24'; Hulsker 59', 61'; Hasselgård 65'; Ljung 69'	Stadium: Molde Stadion; Attendance: 513; Referee: Modolf Holm, Isfjorden

26 June 2002 Third Round	Hødd	0 – 1	Molde	Ulsteinvik
19:00 CEST (UTC+2)	Nevstad (yellow card) 6'; Televik (yellow card) 42'; Ytterland 88'	Report		Stadium: Høddvoll Stadion; Attendance: 1,131; Referee: Stig Rune Krokdal, Orkanger

== Squad statistics ==
=== Appearances and goals ===
No.	Pos	Nat	Player	Total		Tippeligaen		Norwegian Cup	
No.	Pos	Nat	Player	Apps	Goals	Apps	Goals	Apps	Goals
1	GK	(Faroe Islands) FRO	Jákup Mikkelsen	1	0	1	0	0	0
3	DF	(Norway) NOR	Petter Christian Singsaas	5	0	3+1	0	1	0
4	DF	(Sweden) SWE	David Ljung	28	1	25	0	3	1
5	DF	(Norway) NOR	Knut Anders Fostervold	16	2	11+2	2	3	0
6	MF	(Norway) NOR	Daniel Berg Hestad	29	4	26	4	3	0
7	MF	(Norway) NOR	Thomas Mork	17	2	16+1	2	0	0
8	MF	(Norway) NOR	Karl Oskar Fjørtoft	29	1	26	1	2+1	0
9	FW	(Norway) NOR	Bernt Hulsker	27	11	14+10	9	2+1	2
10	MF	(Norway) NOR	Magne Hoseth	24	10	16+5	7	3	3
11	FW	(Norway) NOR	André Schei Lindbæk	24	11	14+7	9	3	2
12	GK	(Sweden) SWE	Eddie Gustafsson	28	0	25	0	3	0
13	DF	(Sweden) SWE	Tobias Carlsson	28	3	26	2	2	1
14	MF	(Sweden) SWE	Fredrik Gustafson	12	0	9+3	0	0	0
15	FW	(Iceland) ISL	Andri Sigthorsson	11	4	8+3	4	0	0
16	MF	(Norway) NOR	Svein Tore Brandshaug	2	0	0+2	0	0	0
17	DF	(Norway) NOR	Trond Strande	24	1	22	1	2	0
18	FW	(Norway) NOR	Stig Arild Råket	10	2	1+7	2	0+2	0
19	MF	(Norway) NOR	Anders Hasselgård	18	3	14+2	2	1+1	1
21	DF	(Iceland) ISL	Bjarni Þorsteinsson	28	1	20+5	1	2+1	0
23	FW	(Norway) NOR	Kai Røberg	6	1	0+5	1	1	0
24	DF	(Norway) NOR	Erlend Ormbostad	2	0	1	0	1	0
26	MF	(Iceland) ISL	Ólafur Stígsson	26	0	8+16	0	1+1	0
Players away from Molde on loan:
Players who left Molde during the season:

=== Goal Scorers ===
Rank	Position	Nat.	No.	Player	Tippeligaen	Norwegian Cup	Total
1	FW	(Norway)	9	Bernt Hulsker	9	2	11
1	FW	(Norway)	11	André Schei Lindbæk	9	2	11
3	MF	(Norway)	10	Magne Hoseth	7	3	10
4	MF	(Norway)	6	Daniel Berg Hestad	4	0	4
4	FW	(Iceland)	15	Andri Sigthorsson	4	0	4
6	DF	(Sweden)	13	Tobias Carlsson	2	1	3
6	MF	(Norway)	19	Anders Hasselgård	2	1	3
8	DF	(Norway)	5	Knut Anders Fostervold	2	0	2
8	MF	(Norway)	7	Thomas Mork	2	0	2
8	FW	(Norway)	18	Stig Arild Råket	2	0	2
11	MF	(Norway)	8	Karl Oskar Fjørtoft	1	0	1
11	DF	(Norway)	17	Trond Strande	1	0	1
11	FW	(Norway)	21	Bjarni Þorsteinsson	1	0	1
11	FW	(Norway)	23	Kai Røberg	1	0	1
11	DF	(Sweden)	4	David Ljung	0	1	1
				Own Goal	1	0	1
				TOTALS	48	10	58

== See also ==
- Molde FK seasons
