= 2001 Norwegian Second Division =

Norwegian football league season

The 2001 2. divisjon was the third highest football league for men in Norway.

26 games were played in 4 groups—changed from the 8 groups in the 2000 season—with 3 points given for wins and 1 for draws. Tollnes, Åsane, Oslo Øst and Lørenskog were promoted to the 1. divisjon. Number twelve, thirteen and fourteen were relegated to the 3. divisjon. The winning teams from each of the 24 groups in the 3. divisjon each faced a winning team from another group in a playoff match, resulting in 12 playoff winners which were promoted to the 2. divisjon.

== League tables ==
=== Group 1 ===
Pos	Team	Pld	W	D	L	GF	GA	GD	Pts	Promotion or relegation
1	Tollnes (P)	26	14	8	4	73	47	+26	50	Promotion to First Division
2	FF Lillehammer	26	15	5	6	44	31	+13	50	
3	Eik-Tønsberg	26	15	4	7	63	44	+19	49	
4	Fredrikstad	26	15	2	9	52	42	+10	47	
5	Bærum	26	12	5	9	60	44	+16	41	
6	Nybergsund	26	12	3	11	43	37	+6	39	
7	Ullensaker/Kisa	26	10	6	10	58	58	0	36	
8	Pors Grenland	26	11	3	12	46	52	−6	36	
9	Kvik Halden	26	11	1	14	41	38	+3	34	
10	Sprint-Jeløy	26	10	4	12	42	54	−12	34	
11	Stabæk 2	26	10	3	13	46	43	+3	33	
12	Asker (R)	26	8	5	13	42	56	−14	29	Relegation to Third Division
13	Ullern (R)	26	5	5	16	36	68	−32	20	Relegation to Third Division
14	Odd Grenland 2 (R)	26	5	4	17	47	79	−32	19	Relegation to Third Division

(P) Promoted; (R) Relegated

=== Group 2 ===
Pos	Team	Pld	W	D	L	GF	GA	GD	Pts	Promotion or relegation
1	Åsane (P)	26	19	4	3	57	17	+40	61	Promotion to First Division
2	Fana	26	17	4	5	66	36	+30	55	
3	Vard Haugesund	26	16	4	6	71	40	+31	52	
4	Fyllingen	26	14	6	6	63	48	+15	48	
5	Løv-Ham	26	14	1	11	59	36	+23	43	
6	Nord	26	13	2	11	54	50	+4	41	
7	Viking 2	26	11	4	11	71	65	+6	37	
8	Vidar	26	11	3	12	60	62	−2	36	
9	Førde	26	9	6	11	60	70	−10	33	
10	Tornado	26	9	5	12	56	63	−7	32	
11	Nest-Sotra	26	9	4	13	49	51	−2	31	
12	Sandnes (R)	26	9	4	13	47	56	−9	31	Relegation to Third Division
13	Florø (R)	26	4	5	17	32	69	−37	17	Relegation to Third Division
14	Stord (R)	26	1	0	25	31	113	−82	3	Relegation to Third Division

Source: RSSSF
(P) Promoted; (R) Relegated

=== Group 3 ===
Pos	Team	Pld	W	D	L	GF	GA	GD	Pts	Promotion or relegation
1	Oslo Øst (P)	26	18	4	4	74	36	+38	58	Promotion to First Division
2	Strindheim	26	15	5	6	70	45	+25	50	
3	Rosenborg 2	26	15	4	7	58	37	+21	49	
4	Romerike Fotball	26	14	5	7	66	34	+32	47	
5	Træff	26	11	5	10	55	50	+5	38	
6	Skarbøvik	26	10	6	10	47	58	−11	36	
7	Steinkjer	26	10	5	11	44	48	−4	35	
8	Clausenengen	26	10	5	11	55	63	−8	35	
9	Molde 2	26	9	6	11	60	50	+10	33	
10	Spjelkavik	26	8	6	12	49	66	−17	30	
11	Verdal	26	8	5	13	42	51	−9	29	
12	Gjøvik-Lyn (R)	26	7	6	13	34	48	−14	27	Relegation to Third Division
13	Stjørdals-Blink (R)	26	9	0	17	37	74	−37	27	Relegation to Third Division
14	Ranheim (R)	26	6	2	18	37	68	−31	20	Relegation to Third Division

Source: RSSSF
(P) Promoted; (R) Relegated

=== Group 4 ===
Pos	Team	Pld	W	D	L	GF	GA	GD	Pts	Promotion or relegation
1	Lørenskog (P)	26	18	5	3	69	23	+46	59	Promotion to First Division
2	Skarp	26	17	2	7	85	45	+40	53	
3	Lofoten	26	15	6	5	65	43	+22	51	
4	Lyn 2	26	13	4	9	57	41	+16	43	
5	Alta	26	13	1	12	60	57	+3	40	
6	Stålkameratene	26	11	5	10	60	67	−7	38	
7	Harstad	26	10	5	11	58	49	+9	35	
8	Skjervøy	26	8	10	8	50	50	0	34	
9	Eidsvold Turn	26	10	3	13	52	53	−1	33	
10	Mo	26	9	6	11	55	61	−6	33	
11	Hammerfest	26	8	4	14	44	58	−14	28	
12	Fauske/Sprint (R)	26	8	2	16	46	79	−33	26	Relegation to Third Division
13	Narvik (R)	26	6	6	14	43	58	−15	24	Relegation to Third Division
14	Finnsnes (R)	26	5	3	18	32	92	−60	18	Relegation to Third Division

Source: RSSSF
(P) Promoted; (R) Relegated

== Top goalscorers ==
=== Group 1 ===
21 goals:

- Morten Romsdalen, Tollnes

18 goals:

- Caleb Francis, Ull/Kisa

17 goals:

- Christian Michelsen, Stabæk 2

14 goals:

- Bjørn Tore Hansen, Eik and Kvik Halden
- John Erling Kleppe, Pors
- Kim Nysted, Bærum
- Espen Seheim, Asker

13 goals:

- Lars Kåre Gustavsen, Asker
- Glenn Hamnebukt, Tollnes
- Bård Erik Olsen, Sprint/Jeløy
- Kamal Saaliti, Ullern

=== Group 2 ===
- 25 goals: Kjell Sture Jensen, Vard Haugesund

(incomplete)

=== Group 3 ===
28 goals:

- Jørn Holmen, Romerike

24 goals:

- Kenneth Kvalheim, Oslo Øst

16 goals:

- Kai Røberg, Træff and Molde 2

11 goals:

- Stig Arild Råket, Molde 2
- Nils Gunnar Thomle, Molde 2

(incomplete)

=== Group 4 ===
35 goals:

- Bård Karlsen, Skarp

27 goals:

- Espen Olsen, Lørenskog

23 goals:

- Pål Flønes, Mo

22 goals:

- Øystein Esjeholm, Alta

16 goals:

- Bjørn Strøm, Lofoten

15 goals:

- Roy Berntsen, Harstad
- Einar Kalsæg, Eidsvold Turn
- Evgeniy Sorokon, Stålkameratene

14 goals:

- Tore Karlsen, Fauske/Sprint
- Hans Åge Yndestad, Skarp
