= Dag Petter Breivik =

Norwegian footballer (born 1970)

Personal information
- Date of birth: 31 May 1970 (age 56)
- Position: Winger

Senior career*
Years	Team	Apps	(Gls)
1988–1990	Spjelkavik		
1991–1994	Aalesund		
1995–1996	Stabæk	14	(0)
1996	→ Aalesund (loan)		
1997–1998	Aalesund	42	(5)
1999	Spjelkavik		
- * Club domestic league appearances and goals

Dag Petter Breivik (born 31 May 1970) is a Norwegian former professional footballer who played as a winger. He spent the majority of his career in Aalesunds FK, except for a stint in the Eliteserien with Stabæk.

== Career ==
Growing up in the Ålesund-based club Spjelkavik IL, he was officially drafted into the senior squad in 1988, under manager Reidar Vågnes. In 1988, he was among others described as Spjelkavik's "savior" after his goal secured one point against a Håvard Flo-led Stryn. Breivik was described as having impressed Aalesunds FK's new manager Egil Olsen during an indoor Christmas tournament in 1988, being lauded as the best player of the tournament, but Breivik did not join AaFK during Olsen's sole year in the club.

After the 1989 season, as Breivik started his compulsory military service with recruit training at Steinkjersannan, Aalesund wanted to sign the player. Still, another year passed before the transfer took place. Breivik ultimately signed a contract effective from 1 January 1991. A breakthrough came in May 1991, when Breivik scored one goal and "dribbled and dribbled in Gazza style" during a 6–0 routing of Fana.

Breivik's future was uncertain in the 1992–93 winter break, as he attended a teacher college in Hønefoss. He spent time in Bergen to practice teaching, and in December 1992 he was announced as a new signing by Fyllingen, which the Bergen-based club had to recant. Breivik decided to remain in Aalesunds FK and commute between Hønefoss and Ålesund. From the fall of 1994 he attended the Norwegian School of Sport Sciences in Oslo, hoping to transfer to a club in the Oslo area, most likely Stabæk. He signed for them and clubs agreed on a transfer fee of 100,000 kr, possibly 150,000 contingent on how much he played. In the 1995 Tippeligaen he played only 14 league games, never a full 90 minutes. One of his few starts came against Fana in the cup. He also started and scored in a summer friendly match.

As Stabæk changed managers after the 1995 season, a sports committee in the club decided to axe Breivik, Bjørn Tore Hansen, and Kim Løkke from the senior squad. The players did not have their contracts annulled, but would not be allowed to train with the squad either. Loan deals were mentioned as the most likely outcome. Breivik was first loaned out to Aalesund in 1996. Breivik visited Bryne FK in October 1996, with view to discussing a move there. He would have to take a job outside of football, in the petroleum industry, if he was to play for Bryne. When Aalesund met Bryne in the league, Breivik had reportedly "ridiculed" Bryne's left back; the Bryne coach quipping that he would medicate his own player for headache. However, in the end he transferred to Aalesund permanently.

In 1998, Breivik among others scored his first hat-trick in senior football. He also experienced being sent off in Aalesund's largest loss in recent history, a 1–6 home defeat to Start. Sunnmørsposten accused the purported victim of Breivik's tackle, Frank Tønnessen, of diving. In the important 2– victory over Raufoss, where Breivik scored the decisive goal, he was assisted by a then-adolescent John Arne Riise. Breivik left Aalesund after the season.

Spending the first half of 1999 at the University of California, Berkeley, Breivik returned to Ålesund in the summer of 1999 and was able to join a lesser team in the city, his original club, Spjelkavik. He made his debut on 13 August. Near the end of 1999 he chose to move back to the Oslo area, leaving Spjelkavik.

== Style of play ==
The newspaper that mainly covered Aalesunds FK, Sunnmørsposten, called Breivik "fond of dribbling", able to perform "acrobatic moments" and possessing a "tender left foot".

== Personal life ==
Already from childhood, he was nicknamed "Charlie", a name that stuck with him as a football player.
