= Hasselgård =

Hasselgård is a surname. Notable people with the surname include:

- Anders Hasselgård (born 1978), Norwegian footballer
- Jostein Hasselgård (born 1979), Norwegian singer and musician
- Stan Hasselgård (1922–1948), Swedish jazz clarinetist
