= Bernt Hulsker =

Norwegian footballer (born 1977)

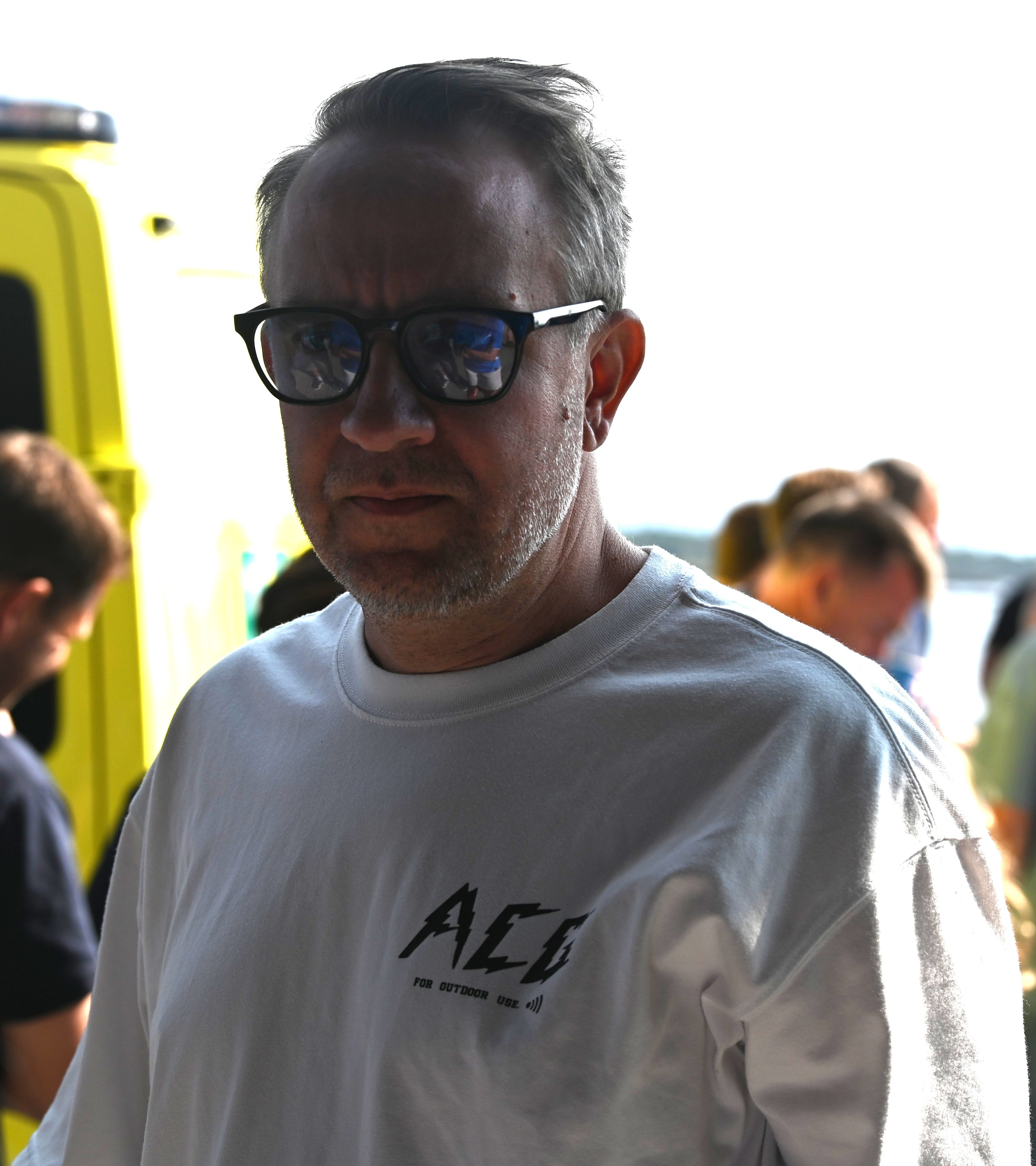

Personal information
- Full name: Bernt Nikolai Hulsker
- Date of birth: 9 September 1977 (age 49)
- Place of birth: Den Haag, Netherlands
- Height: 1.88 m (6 ft 2 in)
- Position: Striker

Youth career
- 1983–1994: Vestnes Varfjell

Senior career*
Years	Team	Apps	(Gls)
1995	Vestnes Varfjell	11	(7)
1996–1997	Tomrefjord		
1998	Vestnes Varfjell	16	(15)
1999	Træff		
1999–2004	Molde	114	(31)
2005	Vålerenga	13	(0)
2006–2007	AIK	24	(2)
2007	→ Start (loan)	9	(3)
2008–2010	Start	57	(18)
2010	→ Stabæk (loan)	11	(0)
- * Club domestic league appearances and goals

Bernt Nikolai Hulsker (born 9 September 1977) is a Norwegian retired footballer as well as author, comedian, radio host, and betting ambassador. He was born in Den Haag, but grew up in Vestnes, Norway.

== Media career ==
Hulsker participates in the football program "Foppall" on VGTV. He also has his own footballpodcast on iTunes "Foppall with Bernt Hulsker", that immediately after release ended up on the iTunes leaderboard in Norway and stayed there ever since.

He became the center of media attention when in 2015, during the broadcast of draw for the UEFA Euro 2016 qualifying play-offs, upon Norway being paired with Hungary, he exclaimed "Drømlottning!" ("Dream pick!") while pounding the desk. Norway would lose both playoff matches, and at the start of the tournament, Hulsker publicly apologized to Hungary through ambassador Anna Sikó and pledged to support the Hungarian team.

== Career statistics ==
Appearances and goals by club, season and competition
Club	Season	League			Cup		Continental		Total	
Club	Season	Division	Apps	Goals	Apps	Goals	Apps	Goals	Apps	Goals
Molde	1999	Tippeligaen	2	0	0	0	0	0	2	0
Molde	2000	Tippeligaen	21	7	2	6	2	1	25	14
Molde	2001	Tippeligaen	23	8	3	3	—		26	11
Molde	2002	Tippeligaen	24	9	3	2	—		27	11
Molde	2003	Tippeligaen	23	3	1	4	5	0	29	7
Molde	2004	Tippeligaen	21	4	3	1	—		24	5
Molde	Total		114	31	12	16	7	1	133	48
Vålerenga	2005	Tippeligaen	13	0	6	12	2	1	21	13
AIK	2006	Allsvenskan	18	2	0	0	—		18	2
AIK	2007	Allsvenskan	6	0	0	0	0	0	6	0
AIK	Total		24	2	0	0	0	0	24	2
Start (loan)	2007	Tippeligaen	9	3	0	0	—		9	3
Start	2008	Adeccoligaen	23	8	1	1	—		24	9
Start	2009	Tippeligaen	27	9	0	0	—		27	9
Start	2010	Tippeligaen	7	1	0	0	—		7	1
Start	Total		66	21	1	1	—	—	67	22
Stabæk (loan)	2010	Tippeligaen	11	0	2	5	0	0	13	5
Career total			228	54	21	34	9	2	258	90
