= Bjørn Tore Hansen (footballer, born 1975) =

Norwegian footballer (born 1975)

Personal information
- Full name: Bjørn Tore Bendvold Hansen
- Date of birth: 6 June 1975 (age 51)
- Position: Striker

Youth career
- Fredrikstad

Senior career*
Years	Team	Apps	(Gls)
1992–1993	Fredrikstad		
1994–1996	Stabæk	3	(0)
1996	→ Mjøndalen (loan)		
1997–1998	Aalesund		
1998–1999	Sogndal	12	(3)
2000–2001	Eik-Tønsberg		
2001–2003	Kvik Halden		
2004–2005	Sarpsborg		

International career
1990	Norway U15	9	(1)
1991	Norway U16	1	(0)
1992	Norway U17	9	(2)
1993–1994	Norway U19	5	(0)
- * Club domestic league appearances and goals

Bjørn Tore Hansen (born 6 June 1975) is a retired Norwegian footballer who played as a striker. Known as a prolific goalscorer in the third tier, he also played in Eliteserien for Stabæk and Sogndal.

== Career ==
Growing up in Fredrikstad FK, Hansen represented Norway as a youth international. In 1993 he moved from Fredrikstad city to attend school in Oslo, and would start training with Lyn, hoping for a transfer. Hansen ended up joining Stabæk ahead of the 1994 season, but before the season even started, Hansen broke his leg. The injury came in an international youth tournament in early April 1994, and was caused by a Greece U19 player. The transfer fee was the subject of a lengthy discussion, but was set to 60,000 kr. In 1995, Hansen returned and finally got some playtime for Stabæk, but only three league games as a substitute. Together with Dag Petter Breivik and Kim Løkke he was axed from the squad in 1996, first loaned out to Mjøndalen. After the 1996 season, Mjøndalen's manager Bård Wiggen moved to Aalesunds FK, and Hansen followed, having also had offers from clubs such as Drøbak-Frogn.

In the summer of 1998, Sogndal struggled in the 1998 Eliteserien and tried strengthening their squad by signing Hansen. Sogn Avis reported the transfer fee at 150,000 kr. He made his first start in late July, but did not succeed as Sogndal sustained another loss. A highlight came in September 1998, when Hansen scored the only goal in a 1–0 away victory against Lillestrøm. The relegation would have been sealed without this victory, but eventually that became the outcome. In 1999 he did not enjoy the confidence of the manager, and mostly played on the B team. Hansen was released by Sogndal in 1999. He was in contact with Hamarkameratene regarding a transfer, but ended up signing for First Division club Eik-Tønsberg.

Hansen's contract with Eik-Tønsberg would expire on 15 July 2001. He considered rejoining Fredrikstad FK. Hansen instead joined Kvik Halden in the summer of 2001 to help the team escape relegation from the 2001 2. divisjon. Whereas his performance in his debut match was not impressive, Hansen found his goalscoring form and scored several goals during the fall. The 2002 season was much less productive, with Hansen scoring only 3 goals, among others tying with central defender Joacim Jonsson. After the season, Hansen underwent groin surgery.

Joining Sarpsborg FK in 2004, the team was languishing in the Third Division, but won promotion to the 2005 2. divisjon. Hansen was one of the main contributors, scoring almost 50 goals in the 2004 3. divisjon.

== Personal life ==
He was a son of Thore Hansen.
