= Magne Hoseth =

Norwegian football manager and former player (born 1980)

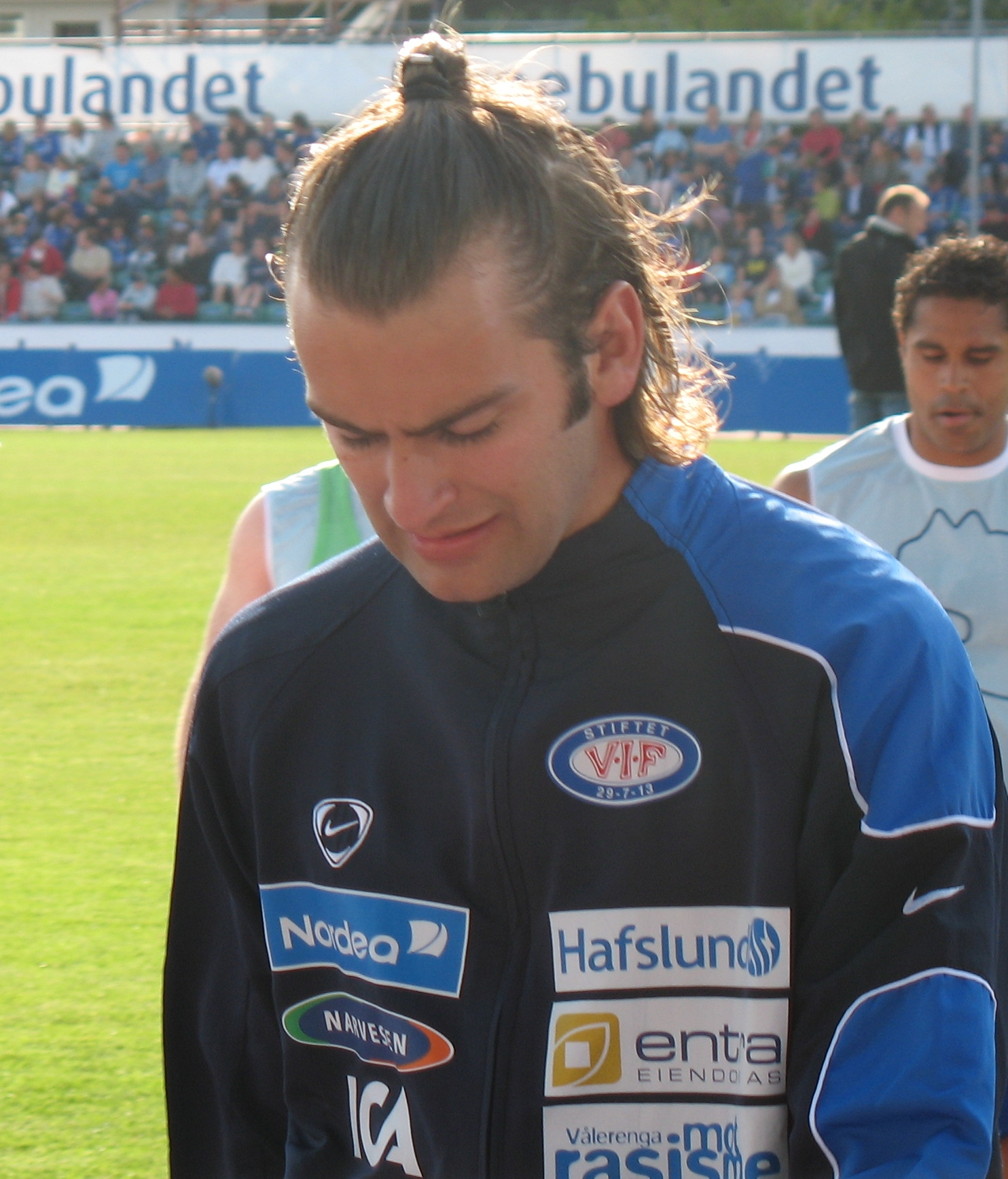
- Hoseth playing for Vålerenga in 2006

Personal information
- Date of birth: 13 October 1980 (age 46)
- Place of birth: Averøy, Norway
- Height: 1.84 m (6 ft 0 in)
- Position: Midfielder

Youth career
- Averøykameratene

Senior career*
Years	Team	Apps	(Gls)
1997–1998	Averøykameratene	42	(0)
1998–2004	Molde	117	(49)
2004–2005	Copenhagen	28	(8)
2005–2006	Vålerenga	20	(1)
2006–2014	Molde	167	(41)
2014	Stabæk	9	(1)
2014–2015	Viking	9	(0)
2015	Aalesund	10	(2)
2016–2017	Notodden	18	(4)
2017	Kristiansund	3	(0)
Total		423	(106)

International career
1996	Norway U15	9	(3)
1997	Norway U16	4	(0)
1998	Norway U18	6	(2)
1999	Norway U19	2	(0)
1999–2001	Norway U21	16	(6)
2001–2010	Norway	22	(1)

Managerial career
- 2019–2022: Kristiansund (assistant)
- 2022–2024: KÍ
- 2024: Lyngby
- 2024: B36
- 2025: Kristiansund (assistant)
- 2025: Molde (assistant)
- 2025: Molde (interim)
- 2026: Strømsgodset (assistant)
- 2026–: Strømsgodset
- * Club domestic league appearances and goals

Magne Hoseth (born Magne Hoset on 13 October 1980) is a Norwegian professional football manager and former player who is the current head coach of Norwegian side Strømsgodset.

During his playing career, he played for Averøykameratene, Molde, Copenhagen, Viking, Aalesund, Stabæk, Notodden and Kristiansund. As a footballer, Hoseth won a total of six trophies, featuring four Eliteserien titles, one Norwegian Cup title and one Royal League title.

From his debut in 2001, he has played 22 matches for the Norway national football team.

== Career ==
=== Early career ===
Hoseth started his career in his local club Averøykameratene. In 1999 was he signed by Molde.

=== Molde ===
In his first season for the club from Romsdal, he performed well both in the Tippeligaen and in the Champions League. His breakthrough came when he came in as a substitute and scored two goals against CSKA Moscow in the second leg of the 1999–2000 UEFA Champions League second qualifying round. He was also a regular in the Norwegian youth national team.

=== Copenhagen ===
In the summer of 2004, Hoseth was transferred to the Danish team Copenhagen. He was very popular in Copenhagen, and was named 2004 player of the year at the club, despite playing only four months that calendar year. Because of his homesickness he wanted to go back to Norway and left the club in 2005.

=== Vålerenga ===
In June 2005, he was signed by Vålerenga from Oslo. He won the 2005 Tippeligaen while at the club.

=== Second spell at Molde ===
In July 2006, he returned to his old club Molde. Despite the team was relegated to 1. divisjon, Hoseth chose to stay in Molde. He became Tippeligaen champion in 2011, 2012 and 2014. With the club, Hoseth won the Norwegian Cup in 2013 after scoring defining goals both in the semifinal against Lillestrøm and later in the final against Molde's main rivals Rosenborg. Hoseth scored Molde's 3–2 goal in the final which ended 4–2. Hoseth made a total of 364 appearances for Molde, the third-highest number of appearances by any player for the club. With 84 top division goals, Hoseth is Molde's all-time top scorer in Eliteserien.

=== Later career ===
On 30 July 2014, Hoseth moved to Stabæk, signing a contract for the remainder of the 2014 season.

After short stays with Viking and Aalesund through the 2015 season, Hoseth signed a two-year contract with 2.divisjon side Notodden in 2016. On 16 August 2017, he signed a contract with Kristiansund. In the club's first ever season in the top flight, Hoseth helped them stay up and finish seventh on the Eliteserien table. On 10 January, Hoseth announced his retirement on Twitter.

== International career ==
Hoseth made a total of 37 appearances and scored eleven goals for Norway at youth international level.

Hoseth made his senior debut for Norway on 25 April 2001, as a half-time substitute for Dan Eggen in a 2–1 home friendly win over Bulgaria. His only goal came on his 5th cap, on 24 January 2004, in a 3–1 win over Honduras in Hong Kong. His 22nd and last cap was on 25 September 2009, a 1–1 draw with Iceland in World Cup qualification.

== Managerial career ==
On 21 November 2022, KÍ announced the appointment of Hoseth as their new head coach, on a two-year contract.

On 11 January 2024, Hoseth was appointed head coach of Danish Superliga club Lyngby, succeeding Freyr Alexandersson, who had departed for Kortrijk. However, on 1 March 2024, after just 50 days in charge, Lyngby terminated Hoseth's contract. The club described the appointment as a "misjudgment" on its part, indicating that the decision to hire him had not yielded the anticipated results.

In June 2024, Magne Hoseth was appointed head coach of Faroese club B36, succeeding Dan Brimsvík. During his tenure, B36 finished fifth in the 2024 Faroe Islands Premier League, missing out on European qualification. Hoseth's final match in charge was the Faroe Islands Cup final on 2 November 2024 against HB. Following the conclusion of his short-term contract, he departed the club to return to Norway for personal reasons and to pursue his UEFA Pro Licence.

On 10 January 2025, Hoseth rejoined Kristiansund as an assistant manager under head coach Amund Skiri.

At the start of the 2026 season, Hoseth was announced as the new assistant coach at Strømsgodset together with Jimmy Brinksby. Only a month later, on 6 February, after head coach Dag-Eilev Fagermo had left the club, Hoseth was promoted to head coach.

== Career statistics ==
=== Club ===
Appearances and goals by club, season and competition
Club	Season	Division	League		Cup		Europe		Total	
Club	Season	Division	Apps	Goals	Apps	Goals	Apps	Goals	Apps	Goals
Molde	1999	Tippeligaen	14	2	5	0	9 (Note: Appearances in UEFA Champions League, including qualifying games)	2	28	4
Molde	2000	Tippeligaen	20	15	3	1	2 (Note: Appearances in UEFA Cup/UEFA Europa League, including qualifying games)	0	25	16
Molde	2001	Tippeligaen	24	10	3	4	—		27	14
Molde	2002	Tippeligaen	21	7	3	3	—		24	10
Molde	2003	Tippeligaen	24	11	3	0	5	3	32	14
Molde	2004	Tippeligaen	14	4	1	0	—		15	4
Molde	Total		117	49	18	8	16	5	151	62
Copenhagen	2004–05	Superliga	28	8		1	0	0	28	9
Vålerenga	2005	Tippeligaen	12	1	2	0	4 (Note: Two appearances in UEFA Champions League and two appearances in the UEFA Cup, both including qualifying games)	0	14	1
Vålerenga	2006	Tippeligaen	8	0	1	0	0	0	9	0
Vålerenga	Total		20	1	3	0	4	0	27	1
Molde	2006	Tippeligaen	11	4	0	0	3	0	14	4
Molde	2007	1. divisjon	24	6	1	0	—		25	6
Molde	2008	Tippeligaen	21	3	5	5	—		26	8
Molde	2009	Tippeligaen	26	7	7	2	—		33	9
Molde	2010	Tippeligaen	25	9	3	1	4	1	32	11
Molde	2011	Tippeligaen	25	5	3	0	—		28	5
Molde	2012	Tippeligaen	16	3	4	2	5 (Note: Three appearances in UEFA Champions League and two appearances in UEFA Europa League, both including qualifying games)	0	25	5
Molde	2013	Tippeligaen	14	4	4	3	3 (Note: Two appearances in UEFA Champions League and one appearance in UEFA Europa League, both including qualifying games)	0	21	7
Molde	2014	Tippeligaen	5	0	2	0	2	1	9	1
Molde	Total		167	41	29	13	17	2	213	56
Stabæk	2014	Tippeligaen	9	1	2	1	—		11	2
Viking	2015	Tippeligaen	9	0	3	0	—		12	0
Aalesund	2015	Tippeligaen	10	2	0	0	—		10	2
Notodden	2016	2. divisjon	13	4	0	0	—		13	4
Notodden	2017	2. divisjon	5	0	3	1	—		8	1
Notodden	Total		18	4	3	1	—	—	21	5
Kristiansund	2017	Eliteserien	3	0	0	0	—		3	0
Career total			381	106	58	24	37	7	476	137

=== International ===
Appearances and goals by national team and year
National team	Year	Apps	Goals
Norway	2001	1	0
Norway	2002	1	0
Norway	2003	1	0
Norway	2004	12	1
Norway	2005	3	0
Norway	2006	2	0
Norway	2009	2	0
Total		22	1

Scores and results list Norway's goal tally first, score column indicates score after each Hoseth goal.

List of international goals scored by Magne Hoseth
No.	Date	Venue	Opponent	Score	Result	Competition
1	25 January 2004	Hong Kong Stadium, Hong Kong	Honduras	3–1	3–1	2004 Lunar New Year Cup

=== Managerial ===
As of match played 1 November 2026

Managerial record by team and tenure
Team	From	To	Record					Ref
Team	From	To	P	W	D	L	Win %	Ref
KÍ	21 November 2022	10 January 2024	43	26	8	9	60.5	
Lyngby	11 January 2024	1 March 2024	2	0	0	2	0.0	
B36	6 June 2024	31 December 2024	19	8	4	7	42.1	
Molde (caretaker)	14 September 2025	21 December 2025	10	4	1	5	40.0	
Strømsgodset	6 February 2026	present	32	21	6	5	65.6	
Total			106	59	19	28	55.7	—

== Honours ==
As a player
Copenhagen

- Royal League: 2004–05

Vålerenga

- Tippeligaen: 2005

Molde

- Tippeligaen: 2011, 2012, 2014
- Norwegian Football Cup: 2013

As a manager
KÍ

- Faroese Premier League: 2023
