= Ingrid Narum =

Norwegian cross-country skier

Ingrid Narum (born 1981) is a retired Norwegian cross-country skier.

She competed at the 2001 Junior World Championships, winning the silver medal in the sprint.

She made her World Cup debut in the March 2000 Oslo sprint race. She collected her first World Cup when finishing 14th in the December 2001 Garmisch-Partenkirchen sprint race. In the 2002–03 season she made the top 20 on six occasions, improving to a 12th place in Reit im Winkl. She broke the top 10 in February 2004 in Stockholm, finishing 8th, and also competed in World Cup relays and team sprints. Her last World Cup outing came in October 2004 in Düsseldorf.

She represented the sports clubs Sogndal IL.
