= Bjarni Þorsteinsson =

Icelandic priest and musician

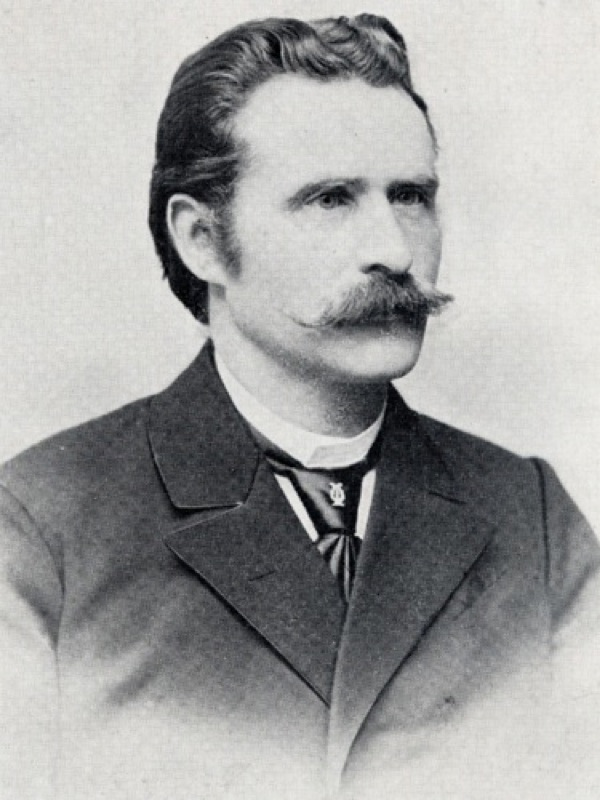
- Born: 14 October 1861; Mýrasýsla, Iceland
- Died: 2 August 1938 (aged 76)

Bjarni Þorsteinsson (also spelled Bjarni Thorsteinsson; 14 October 1861 – 2 August 1938) was an Icelandic priest, church musician and composer, best known as an important collector, transcriber and publisher of folk songs.

== Career ==
He was born in Mýrasýsla and studied at the Reykjavík Latin School (Menntaskólinn í Reykjavík), and also took lessons in organ playing and theory during his student years. Having completed his education as a priest, he was appointed priest at Siglufjörður in northern Iceland, where he served for 47 years.

Although he had only received a fairly rudimentary musical education, Bjarni was also a composer, mostly writing songs for voice and piano. Most of them were published during his lifetime and many were also recorded on 78 rpm records, including Sólsetursljóð, which remains his most popular composition. He also wrote a set of choral responds for feast days (Hátíðasöngvar, 1899), of which the ones for Christmas Eve and New Year's Eve are still frequently performed at Icelandic church services.

Bjarni's most significant contribution to music, however, was in collecting and publishing Icelandic folk songs, along with transcriptions from medieval manuscripts and printed music books of the early modern era. His publication, Íslenzk þjóðlög (Icelandic Folk Songs) was published in Copenhagen between 1906 and 1909. In the preface, he recounted how the Icelandic Literature Society had rejected his application to finance the publication of the work, and that publication only became possible through the last-minute support of the Danish Carlsberg Foundation.

The biography of Bjarni Þorsteinsson, Eldhugi við ysta haf, written by the Icelandic scholar Viðar Hreinsson, was published in 2011 and received positive reviews.

== Publications ==
- Bjarni Þorsteinsson. Hátíðasöngvar. Copenhagen, 1899, and subsequent reprints.
- Bjarni Þorsteinsson. Íslenzk sálmasöngsbók með fjórum röddum. Reykjavík, 1903.
- Bjarni Þorsteinsson. Íslenzk þjóðlög. Copenhagen, 1906-1909.
- Bjarni Þorsteinsson. 24 sönglög fyrir eina rödd með fortepiano. Reykjavík, 1928.
