= Frank Tønnesen =

Norwegian footballer (born 1973)

Personal information
- Full name: Frank Fosseli Tønnesen
- Date of birth: 3 January 1973 (age 53)
- Position: Defender

Senior career*
Years	Team	Apps	(Gls)
1993–1999	Start		
2000	Vigør		
2001–2002	Mandalskameratene		
2003–2005	Fløy		

International career
1994–1995	Norway U21	14	(0)
- * Club domestic league appearances and goals

Frank Tønnesen (born 3 January 1973) is a retired Norwegian football defender.

He spent most of his career at IK Start, from 1993 through 1999. After one season in FK Vigør he moved west to Mandalskameratene, before rounding off his career in his hometown with Fløy.
