= Martin Høyem =

Norwegian footballer (born 1982)

Personal information
- Full name: Martin Høyem
- Date of birth: 16 January 1982 (age 44)
- Place of birth: Trondheim, Norway
- Position: Defender

Youth career
- Sjetne

Senior career*
Years	Team	Apps	(Gls)
–2003	Rosenborg	0	(0)
2003–2005	Molde	18	(0)
2006	Strømsgodset	0	(0)
2006-unknown	Kolstad		

International career
2000	Norway U18	7	(2)
- * Club domestic league appearances and goals

Martin Høyem (born 16 January 1982) is a Norwegian former footballer. He played as a defender for the clubs Rosenborg, Molde, Strømsgodset and Kolstad during his professional career.

== Career ==
Høyem was born in Trondheim, and played for the local club Sjetne as a kid, before he began his professional career at Rosenborg, playing for the club's reserve team. Høyem started his career as a forward, but was used as a centre back in Rosenborg because the club considered him to have greater potential in that position. Høyem was capped seven times and scored two goals for the Norwegian under-18 team in 2000. In June 2001, he was promoted to Rosenborg's first-team squad. Høyem did not get any chances to play for the first team, and after Rosenborg bought Torjus Hansen, Høyem's way to the first-team seemed even longer. In the pre-season of the 2003-season he played some friendly matches. The Norwegian clubs Brann and Haugesund announced their interest in buying Høyem. Nevertheless, Høyem needed a knee surgery, which kept him out of play for a while. The interest from Brann and Haugesund disappeared.

During the second half of the 2003-season, Høyem was loaned out to Molde. He made his debut for the team on 14 August 2003 in a match against KÍ Klaksvík in the 2003–04 UEFA Cup. Even though that was Høyem's only match for Molde during the short loan-spell, he signed a two-year contract with Molde after the season. He got his debut in Tippeligaen the next season, when he replaced Trond Strande in the 2–0 win against Lyn on 12 April 2004. Unlike in Rosenborg, Høyem was used as a full back in Molde, and dubbed to be the successor of Strande or Knut Anders Fostervold in the starting line-up.

After Bo Johansson became head coach of Molde in 2005, Høyem chances in the first-team were limited, and halfway through the season the second-tier team Hønefoss wanted to loan Høyem. As Molde was to meet Hønefoss in the semi-final of the 2005 Norwegian Football Cup, Molde wanted a deal where Høyem was not allowed to play for Hønefoss against Molde. This was declined by Hønefoss, and Høyem stayed at Molde until the end of the 2005-season when he left for Strømsgodset. He played a total of 18 matches for Molde in Tippeligaen, and was a part of the team that won the Norwegian Cup in 2005.

After playing half a season for Strømsgodset in the First Division, where his only match was in the 2006 Norwegian Football Cup against Klemetsrud, Høyem was selected to be sent off on loan by head coach Dag-Eilev Fagermo. However, as no clubs showed interest, Strømsgodset released Høyem from his contract. Høyem then joined the Second Division side Kolstad as one of two professional players in the team to help Kolstad avoid relegation. Høyem was however sent off in two of his first matches for Kolstad, and at the end of the 2006-season, Kolstad was relegated.

== Honours ==
Molde

- Norwegian Football Cup: 2005
