= Øyvind Hoås =

Norwegian footballer (born 1983)

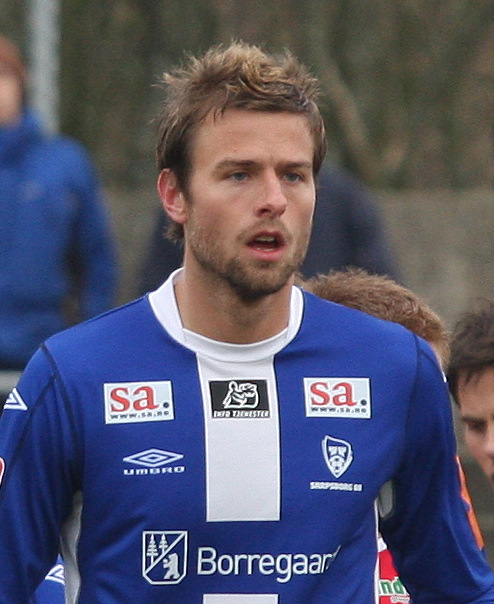

Personal information
- Date of birth: 28 October 1983 (age 42)
- Place of birth: Molde, Norway
- Height: 2.03 m (6 ft 8 in)
- Position: Striker

Team information
- Current team: Kristiansund
- Number: 9

Youth career
- Sunndal

Senior career*
Years	Team	Apps	(Gls)
2003–2004	Molde	21	(2)
2005–2007	Fredrikstad	47	(6)
2008–2013	Sarpsborg 08	128	(44)
2013–2015	Hønefoss	38	(3)
2015–	Kristiansund	4	(0)
- * Club domestic league appearances and goals as of 25 May 2015

Øyvind Hoås (born 28 October 1983) is a Norwegian football striker who currently plays for Kristiansund.

He previously played for Fredrikstad, but left in 2008. He joined Fredrikstad from Molde FK in 2003. Ahead of the 2007–08 season, he was on a trial with English League One side Luton Town.

At 2.03 m (6 ft 8 in), Hoås is one of the tallest outfield top-flight footballers in Europe.

He is a former under-21 international with Norway, scoring one goal in four appearances.

He scored the last league goal to be scored in Fredrikstad's old ground and the first goal in their new stadium as well.

== Career statistics ==
As of 25 May 2015

Season	Club	Division	League		Cup		Total	
Season	Club	Division	Apps	Goals	Apps	Goals	Apps	Goals
2003	Molde	Tippeligaen	4	0	2	1	6	1
2004	Molde	Tippeligaen	17	2	3	4	20	6
2005	Fredrikstad	Tippeligaen	22	4	3	2	25	6
2006	Fredrikstad	Tippeligaen	17	1	4	2	21	3
2007	Fredrikstad	Tippeligaen	8	1	3	2	11	3
2008	Sarpsborg 08	Adeccoligaen	19	6	1	1	20	7
2009	Sarpsborg 08	Adeccoligaen	28	10	0	0	28	10
2010	Sarpsborg 08	Adeccoligaen	21	8	1	0	22	8
2011	Sarpsborg 08	Tippeligaen	23	6	2	0	25	6
2012	Sarpsborg 08	Adeccoligaen	28	13	2	1	30	14
2013	Sarpsborg 08	Tippeligaen	9	1	1	0	10	1
2013	Hønefoss	Tippeligaen	9	0	0	0	9	0
2014	Hønefoss	1. divisjon	18	3	1	0	19	3
2015	Hønefoss	OBOS-ligaen	11	0	1	0	12	0
2015	Kristiansund	OBOS-ligaen	4	0	0	0	4	0
Career Total			238	55	24	13	262	68
