= Steven Lustü =

Danish footballer (born 1971)

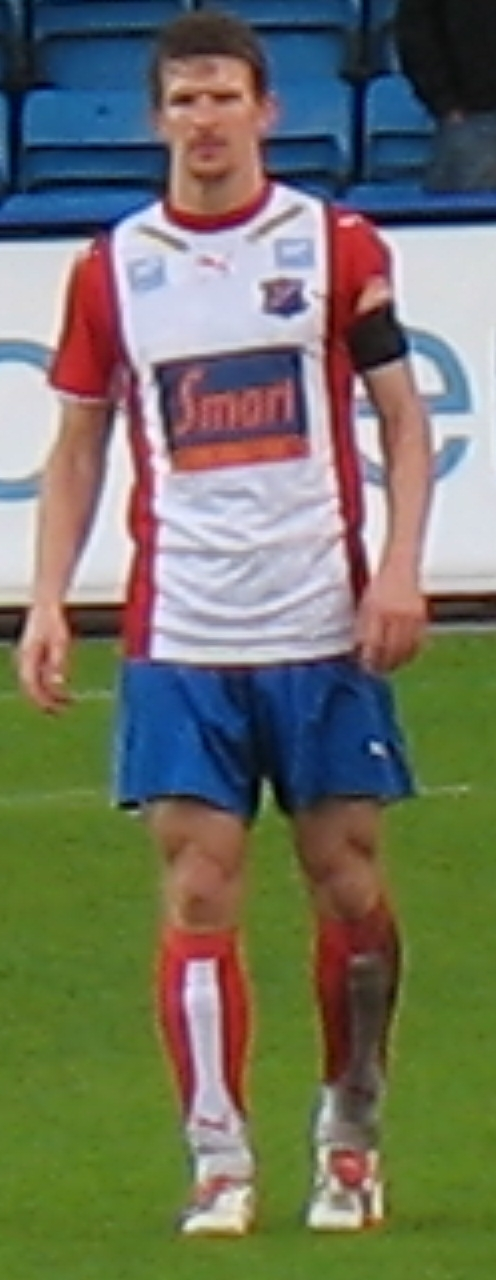
- Lustü at Lyn

Personal information
- Date of birth: April 13, 1971 (age 55)
- Place of birth: Vordingborg, Denmark
- Height: 1.85 m (6 ft 1 in)
- Position: Centre back

Team information
- Current team: Viborg FF (U17 Head coach)

Senior career*
| Years | Team | Apps | (Gls) |
| 1991–1993 | Næstved | 19 | (2) |
| 1993–2000 | Herfølge | 169 | (3) |
| 2000–2001 | Akademisk Boldklub | 41 | (0) |
| 2002–2006 | Lyn | 106 | (2) |
| 2007–2009 | Silkeborg | 60 | (0) |
| Total | | 395 | (7) |

International career
| 2000–2005 | Denmark | 9 | (0) |

Managerial career
- 2018: Kjellerup
- * Club domestic league appearances and goals

Steven Lustü (born 13 April 1971) is a Danish former football player. He played as a central defender. He is currently the head coach of Viborg FF U17.

Lustü spent most of his professional club career in Denmark, only moving abroad for five years to play for Norwegian club FC Lyn. From 2000 to 2005, Lustü played nine games for the Danish national team.

== Biography ==
Steven Lustü started his senior career with Næstved BK in the 1991–92 Superliga championship. In 1993, he moved on to Superliga club Herfølge BK, with whom he won the 2000 Danish Superliga championship. He made his debut for the Danish national team under manager Morten Olsen, in an August 2000 match against the Faroe Islands.

He went on to play for Superliga rivals AB, but left the club after a single year. He moved abroad to play for Norwegian club FC Lyn in 2002. He played almost every game for Lyn, and enjoyed great popularity with the club's supporters, who nicknamed him "Psycho" on account of his uncompromising playing style. During his stay at Lyn, Lustü played a further eight Danish national team games. He was included in the Danish squad for the 2002 FIFA World Cup, though he spent the entire tournament as an unused substitute. He participated in Denmark's unsuccessful qualifying campaign for the 2006 FIFA World Cup, and played his final national team game in Denmark's February 2005 loss to Greece.

Steven Lustü moved back home to Denmark when he signed with Silkeborg in December 2006. He made his first Superliga appearance for Silkeborg on 11 March 2007, in a match against AC Horsens. On 6 December 2009, Lustü played his last career game, as Silkeborg won 3–0 over Brøndby IF. Lustü was taken out in stoppage time to standing ovations, marking the end of a career that saw Lustü play 247 games in the Danish Superliga championship.

== Coaching career ==
After retiring from professional football, Lustü started his coaching career. He began at the club he retired in, Silkeborg IF, and got in charge of the second team. Later, he took charge of the U17 girls at AC Silkeborg.

On 27 April 2016, Lustü was confirmed as the new head coach of the U15 of Viborg FF. He left the job in June 2018, to become the head coach of Kjellerup IF. The deal was already announced in May 2018. He was fired from the club in October 2018.

On 18 January 2019, Lustü went back to Viborg FF, this time as the head coach of the U17 squad.

== Honours ==
- Danish Superliga:
  - Winner (1): 2000
- Norwegian Cup:
  - Runner-up (1): 2004
