= David Ljung =

Swedish former footballer (born 1975)

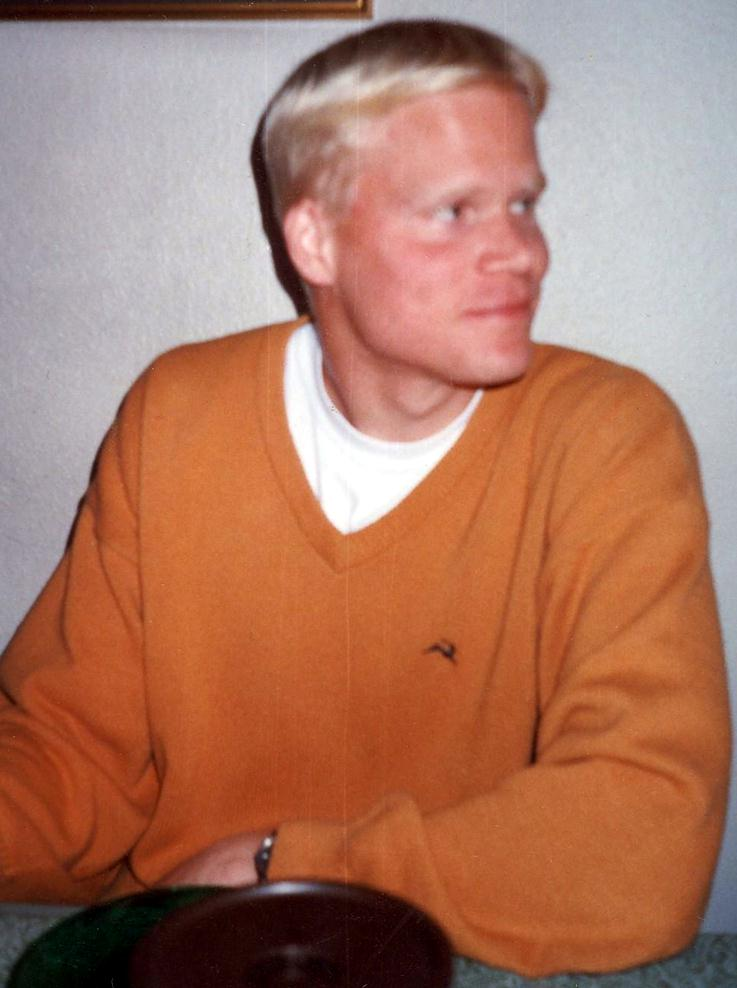

Personal information
- Full name: Per Jonas David Ljung
- Date of birth: 27 September 1975 (age 51)
- Place of birth: Skellefteå, Sweden
- Height: 1.88 m (6 ft 2 in)
- Position: Defender

Youth career
- –1992: Skellefteå AIK

Senior career*
Years	Team	Apps	(Gls)
1992–1995	Skellefteå AIK	35	(2)
1996	IF Gimo	19	(1)
1997	Sirius	20	(3)
1998–2000	AIK	43	(4)
2001–2004	Molde	74	(6)
2005	Helsingborg	17	(0)
2006	Padova	3	(0)
- * Club domestic league appearances and goals

Per Jonas David Ljung (born 27 September 1975) is a Swedish former footballer who played as a defender.

== Career ==
David Ljung signed for Molde FK in August 2001. In Molde, Ljung played 80 games before his transfer to Helsingborg in June 2004.

23 January 2006, Ljung left Helsingborg to play for Serie C team Padova.

Ljung Joined Aik in 1998 and became a regular member of the team's defence during the 1999 season. He remained with the club until 2001, when he moved to Norwegian club Molde FK.

== Honours ==
AIK

- Allsvenskan (1): 1998
- Svenska Cupen (1): 1998-99
