= Kjell Alseth =

Norwegian Football referee

Kjell Alseth (born 15 August 1960 in Stjørdal Municipality) is a Norwegian Football referee. He represents Stjørdals/Blink. Alseth debuted as referee in Tippeligaen 18 August 1996 in Skeid's 3–1 victory against Stabæk. He has (pr 28 June 2007 refereed 153 Norwegian football matches. He has formerly been a UEFA official, and is known to have served as a referee in FIFA matches in 2002.
