= Ólafur Stígsson =

Icelandic footballer

Personal information
- Full name: Ólafur Ingi Stígsson
- Date of birth: 16 December 1975 (age 50)
- Place of birth: Iceland
- Height: 1.81 m (5 ft 11 1/2 in)
- Position: Midfielder

Team information
- Current team: Elliði

Senior career*
Years	Team	Apps	(Gls)
1993–1996	Fylkir	26	(2)
1996–1997	East Fife	3	(0)
1997	Fylkir	0	(0)
1997–2000	Valur	23	(1)
2000–2002	Fylkir	28	(3)
2002–2004	Molde FK	37	(0)
2004–2011	Fylkir	101	(6)

International career
1991	Iceland U17	7	(1)
1993–1994	Iceland U19	11	(4)
1996–1997	Iceland U21	12	(0)
2001–2003	Iceland	9	(0)
- * Club domestic league appearances and goals

Ólafur Ingi Stígsson (born 16 December 1975) is a retired Icelandic footballer. He spent the majority of his playing career with Fylkir, making more than 150 league appearances for the club. Ólafur has also assisted Valur and had spells in Scotland and Norway with East Fife and Molde FK respectively.

Ólafur represented Iceland at youth level in three different age groups: under-17, under-19 and under-21. He made his senior international debut on 15 August 2001, coming on as a substitute for Auðun Helgason in the 1–1 draw with Poland. Ólafur went on to win nine caps for his country, and made his final appearance for Iceland in the goalless draw with Mexico on 20 November 2003.
