= Andri Sigþórsson =

Icelandic footballer

Personal information
- Date of birth: 25 March 1977 (age 49)
- Place of birth: Iceland
- Position: Striker

Youth career
- 1992–1993: KR
- 1993–1994: Bayern Munich

Senior career*
Years	Team	Apps	(Gls)
1994–1996	Bayern Munich II	13	(1)
1996–2000	KR	48	(43)
1997–1998	→ FSV Zwickau (loan)	5	(3)
2000–2001	SV Salzburg	24	(16)
2002–2004	Molde FK	17	(12)
Total		107	(78)

International career
1992–1993	Iceland U17	11	(2)
1994–1995	Iceland U19	9	(5)
1996–1998	Iceland U21	4	(1)
2001–2002	Iceland	7	(2)
- * Club domestic league appearances and goals

Andri Sigþórsson (born 25 March 1977) is an Icelandic former international footballer.

== Career ==
Andri, who played as a striker, played as a youth for KR, before joining the youth setup of Bayern Munich. He played for Bayern's reserve team in the Regionalliga, but returned to Iceland in 1996, rejoining KR. In 2000, he was joint top scorer in the Icelandic Premier Division, and briefly returned to Germany in 1997, for a loan spell with FSV Zwickau. After three more years with KR, moved to Austria, joining SV Salzburg, then to Norway, where he played for Molde FK. His career was cut short in 2004 when he suffered a serious knee injury. He made seven appearances for Iceland, scoring two goals. These goals came in back-to-back matches against Poland and the Czech Republic.

== Personal life ==
Andri is famous for being a star player in Championship Manager 3, being set with the maximum potential of 200. Andri's daughter Amanda Andradóttir made her debut for the Iceland women's national football team in September 2021.
