= Tobias Carlsson (footballer, born 1975) =

Swedish footballer

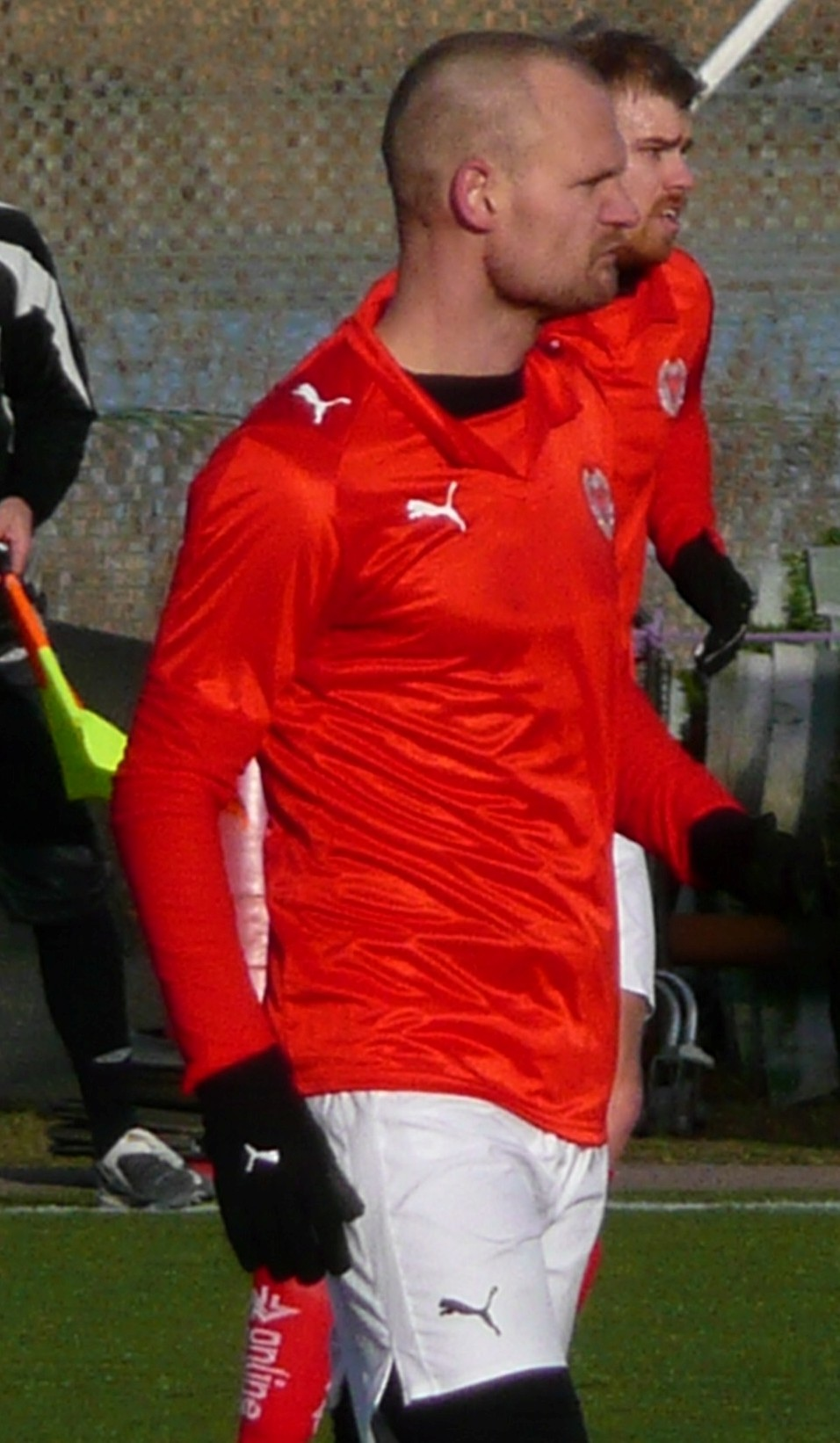

Personal information
- Full name: Johan Tobias Carlsson
- Date of birth: 25 February 1975 (age 51)
- Place of birth: Färjestaden, Sweden
- Height: 1.90 m (6 ft 3 in)
- Position: Defender

Youth career
- –1992: Färjestadens GoIF

Senior career*
Years	Team	Apps	(Gls)
1993–2000	Kalmar FF	153	(9)
2001–2003	Molde FK	72	(2)
2004–2012	Kalmar FF	151	(10)
- * Club domestic league appearances and goals ‡ National team caps and goals as of 4 March 2009

Johan Tobias Carlsson (born 25 February 1975) is a Swedish retired footballer who played as a defender. His last club was Kalmar FF in Allsvenskan.

== Honours and awards ==
- Kalmar FF
  - Allsvenskan: 2008
  - Svenska Cupen: 2007
  - Svenska Supercupen: 2009
