= Sogndal IL =

Sports club in Sogndal, Norway

- Full name: Sogndal Idrettslag
- Founded: 19 February 1926
- Ground: Kvåle stadion, Sogndalsfjøra and Fosshaugane (football only)

Sogndal Idrettslag is a Norwegian alliance sports club from Sogndalsfjøra, Vestland. It has departments for association football, handball, volleyball, track and field, orienteering, taekwondo, swimming, powerlifting, speed skating, cross-country skiing, alpine skiing, and gymnastics. The club colors are white and black.

== Athletics ==
Sogndal has been a minnow in Norwegian athletics. Merete Kvist won five consecutive national silver medals in the 800 metres, one for Sogndal, in 1986. Sigurd Langeland, who became Norwegian triple jump champion for IL Høyang, represented Sogndal IL before his period in the national limelight.

The home field is Kvåle stadion.

== Skiing ==
Ingrid Narum has several World Cup starts. Øyvind Sandbakk has two World Cup starts, and only finished the race once, in a 32nd place.
