= Roy Helge Olsen =

Norwegian football referee

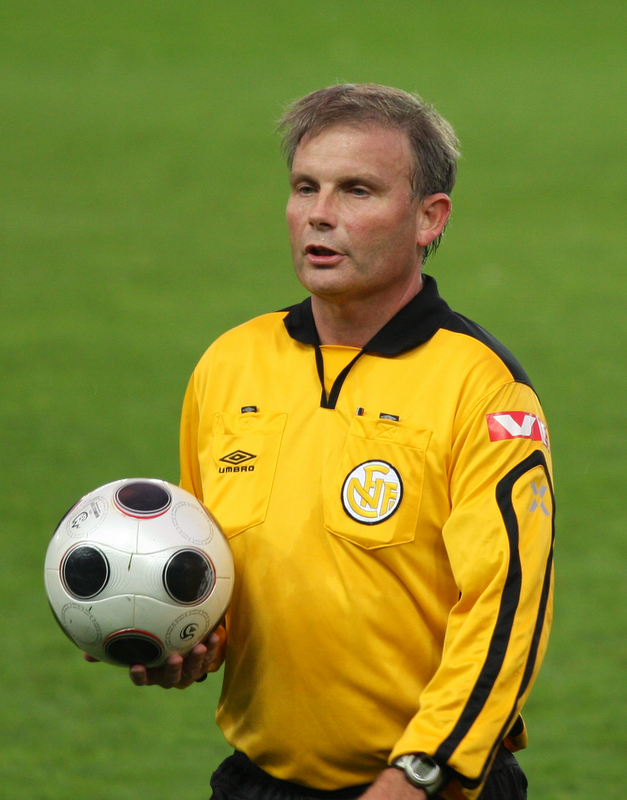
Roy Helge Olsen at Viking Stadion October 5, 2008

Roy Helge Olsen (born 19 January 1965) is a Norwegian football referee from Trondheim, representing Flekkerøy IL from Kristiansand. He started as a referee in 1979 and was a referee in FIFA from 1992 to 2002. Olsen officiated in 2002 World Cup qualifying, refereeing the match between Spain and Bosnia. He has refereed over 30 national matches at different age groups, both men and women, in addition to 28 matches in the European Cup. In 1991, he refereed the Norwegian Cup Final between Strømsgodset and Rosenborg, as well as the Norwegian Cup Final between Vålerenga and Strømsgodset in 1997. He also refereed the European Championship for U-18 in England in 1993.

Olsen won the Kniksen award for Referee of the year in 1993.
