= Bjarni Óskar Þorsteinsson =

Icelandic footballer (born 1976)

Personal information
- Full name: Bjarni Óskar Þorsteinsson
- Date of birth: 31 August 1976 (age 50)
- Place of birth: Iceland
- Height: 1.84 m (6 ft 1/2 in)
- Position: Defender

Senior career*
Years	Team	Apps	(Gls)
1996–2000	KR	76	(4)
1999	→ KFC Uerdingen 05 (loan)	2	(0)
2001–2003	Molde	43	(1)
2004–2006	KR	22	(1)
2007	Grótta	12	(1)
2008	Þróttur Reykjavík	0	(0)
2009–2010	Einherji	22	(5)

International career
1994–1995	Iceland U19	10	(0)
1997	Iceland U21	3	(0)
2000–2003	Iceland	10	(0)
- * Club domestic league appearances and goals

Bjarni Óskar Þorsteinsson (born 31 August 1976) is a retired Icelandic footballer who played as a defender. He won 10 caps for the Iceland national football team between 2000 and 2003.

Bjarni began his playing career with KR in 1996, and went on to make 76 league appearances for the club. In 1999, he spent one month on loan at German side KFC Uerdingen 05, where he played twice. Bjarni signed for Norwegian Tippeligaen club Molde FK in 2001, but did not make a competitive appearance during his first season. He went on to play 43 league matches for the side, scoring once, before returning to KR for the 2004 campaign.

Over the following three seasons Bjarni played 22 Úrvalsdeild matches for KR, before joining 3. deild side Grótta in 2007. He spent one season with the fourth-tier club, during which time he scored once in 13 league games, before returning to the Úrvalsdeild with Þróttur Reykjavík. However, he failed to break into the Þróttur side and made only one cup appearance for the club. Bjarni subsequently signed for 3. deild outfit Einherji for the 2009 season, and went on to score 5 goals in 22 league matches for the side before retiring the following year.

Bjarni made his debut for the Iceland under-19 side at the age of 18, playing at left-back in the 1–2 defeat to Slovakia on 21 September 1994. He went on to play 10 matches for the U19 team. During the 1997 season, Bjarni was selected to represent the Iceland under-21 side on three occasions, including a 1–0 win against Ireland on 5 September. He won his first senior international cap on 31 January 2000, coming on as a substitute for Indriði Sigurðsson in the goalless draw with Norway at the La Manga Stadium in Spain. Bjarni won a total of 10 caps for Iceland, including three appearances in the qualifying tournament for the 2004 UEFA European Championship. He played his final international match on 20 November 2003 in the 0–0 friendly draw with Mexico.
