= Kristian Sørli =

Norwegian footballer (born 1976)

Personal information
- Full name: Kristian Hoem Sørli
- Date of birth: 8 August 1976 (age 50)
- Place of birth: Trondheim, Norway
- Height: 1.78 m (5 ft 10 in)
- Position: Defender

Senior career*
Years	Team	Apps	(Gls)
–1995	Strindheim		
1996–1998	Rosenborg	8	(0)
1999–2000	Start	26	(1)
2001–2005	Viking	69	(8)
2006–2008	Strømsgodset	57	(0)
2009	Stavanger	3	(0)
2011–2012	Ranheim	19	(0)
2013	Strindheim	17	(0)

Managerial career
- 2010: Stavanger
- 2016–: Brodd
- * Club domestic league appearances and goals as of 31 August 2013

Kristian Hoem Sørli (born 8 August 1976) is a retired Norwegian footballer who last played for Strindheim in the 2. divisjon. He has also played for Rosenborg BK, IK Start, Viking FK, Strømsgodset IF and Ranheim.

In 2016, he became the head coach of IL Brodd.

== Career statistics ==
Season	Club	Division	League		Cup		Total	
Season	Club	Division	Apps	Goals	Apps	Goals	Apps	Goals
2000	Start	Tippeligaen	26	1	4	0	30	1
2001	Viking	Tippeligaen	3	0	2	0	5	0
2002	Viking	Tippeligaen	15	1	3	0	18	1
2003	Viking	Tippeligaen	23	5	4	0	27	5
2004	Viking	Tippeligaen	20	2	2	0	22	2
2005	Viking	Tippeligaen	8	0	3	0	11	0
2006	Strømsgodset	1. divisjon	30	0	1	1	31	1
2007	Strømsgodset	Tippeligaen	12	0	5	0	17	0
2008	Strømsgodset	Tippeligaen	15	0	5	0	20	0
2009	Stavanger	1. divisjon	3	0	0	0	3	0
2011	Ranheim	1. divisjon	13	0	2	0	15	0
2012	Ranheim	1. divisjon	6	0	0	0	6	0
2013	Strindheim	2. divisjon	17	0	2	0	19	0
Career Total			191	9	33	1	224	10
