= Hans Åge Yndestad =

Norwegian footballer (born 1980)

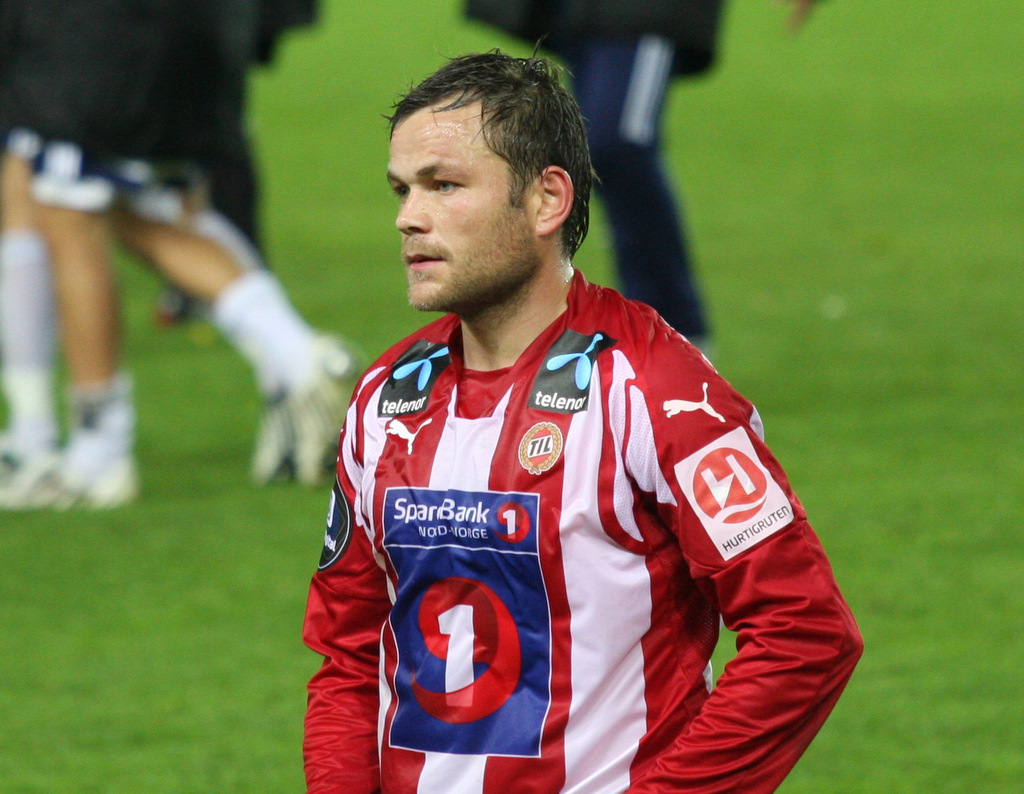

Personal information
- Full name: Hans Åge Yndestad
- Date of birth: 24 July 1980 (age 46)
- Place of birth: Tromsø, Norway
- Position: Midfielder

Senior career*
Years	Team	Apps	(Gls)
–2000	Ulfstind		
2001	→ Skarp (loan)		
2002–2012	Tromsø	248	(8)
2013	Skarp	11	(8)
2013	Senja	15	(3)
2014	Tromsdalen	23	(0)
2015–2016	Finnsnes		
- * Club domestic league appearances and goals

Hans Åge Yndestad (born July 24, 1980) is a Norwegian former footballer. Yndestad is left footed and usually plays as either left back or as left winger.

Yndestad started his career with Ulfstind. He joined Tromsø in 2002 after having spent the 2001 season on loan with IF Skarp. It was former Skarp coach Trond Johansen who brought him to Alfheim.

In 2015, he joined Finnsnes IL.

== Career statistics ==
Season	Club	Division	League		Cup		Total	
Season	Club	Division	Apps	Goals	Apps	Goals	Apps	Goals
2002	Tromsø	1. divisjon	20	0	3	0	23	0
2003	Tromsø	Tippeligaen	20	0	4	0	24	0
2004	Tromsø	Tippeligaen	14	1	3	1	17	2
2005	Tromsø	Tippeligaen	24	2	3	0	27	2
2006	Tromsø	Tippeligaen	21	3	0	0	21	3
2007	Tromsø	Tippeligaen	23	1	3	0	26	1
2008	Tromsø	Tippeligaen	23	0	2	0	25	0
2009	Tromsø	Tippeligaen	26	0	4	1	30	1
2010	Tromsø	Tippeligaen	28	1	3	0	31	1
2011	Tromsø	Tippeligaen	27	0	3	0	30	0
2012	Tromsø	Tippeligaen	22	0	1	0	23	0
2013	Skarp	3. divisjon	11	8	1	0	12	8
2013	Senja	2. divisjon	15	3	0	0	15	3
2014	Tromsdalen	1. divisjon	23	0	2	0	25	0
Career Total			297	19	32	2	329	21
