= Knut Dørum Lillebakk =

Norwegian footballer (born 1978)

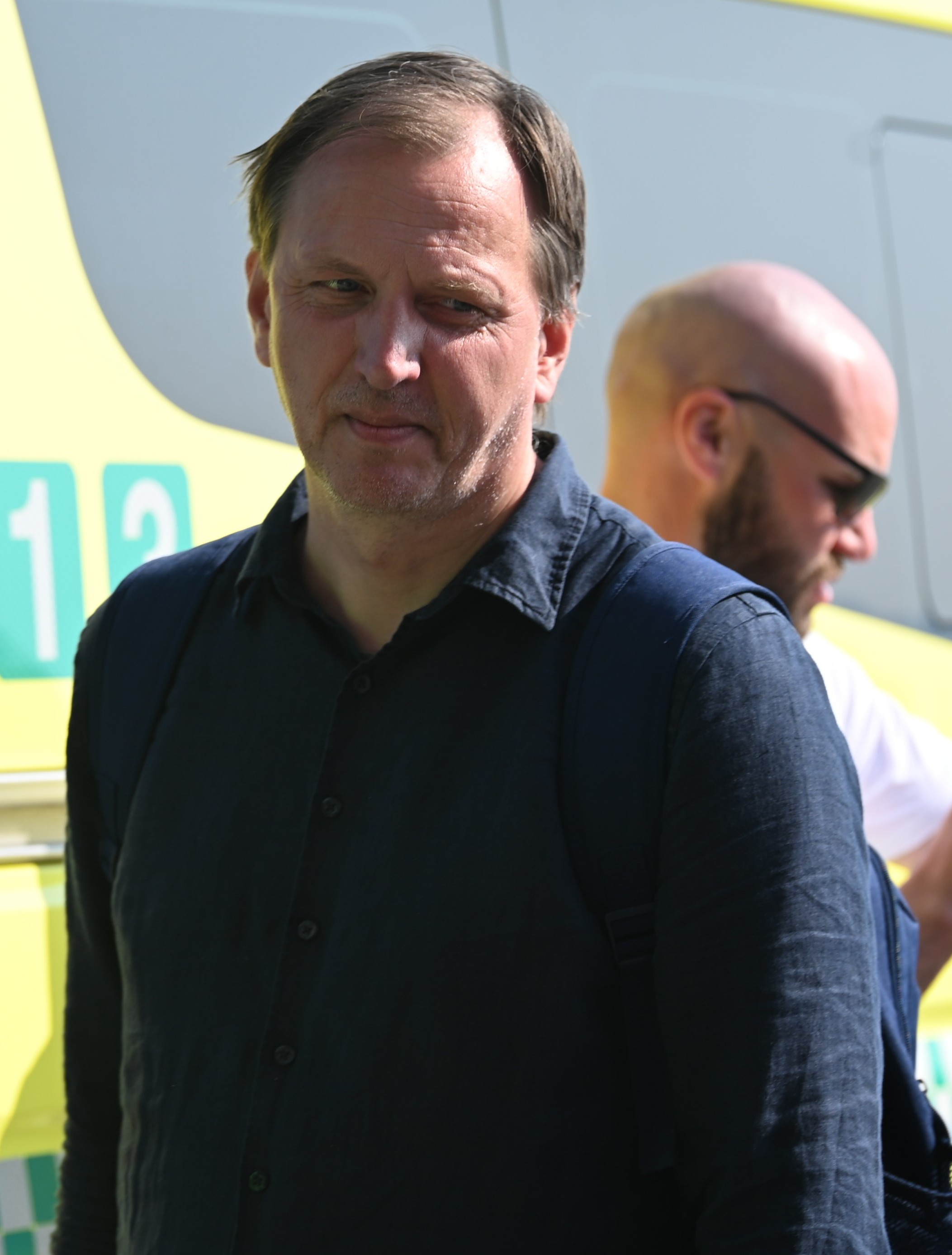

Personal information
- Full name: Knut Dørum Lillebakk
- Date of birth: 27 April 1978 (age 48)
- Place of birth: Norway
- Height: 1.94 m (6 ft 4 1/2 in)
- Position: Goalkeeper

Youth career
- Molde

Senior career*
Years	Team	Apps	(Gls)
2001–2012	Molde	43	(0)
2002	→ Bryne (loan)	10	(0)
2002	→ Aalesund (loan)	3	(0)
2003	→ Bærum (loan)	15	(0)
2004	→ Hødd (loan)	9	(0)
2012	Mysen IF	12	(0)
- * Club domestic league appearances and goals as of 12 November 2011

Knut Dørum Lillebakk (born 27 April 1978) is a Norwegian former football goalkeeper.

Lillebakk has been the second-choice goalkeeper in Molde FK throughout his career, but he had short spells on loan in Bryne FK, Aalesunds FK, Bærum SK and IL Hødd.

In 2011 he moved to the town of Mysen, Eidsberg municipality (the Indre Østfold municipality as of January 2020), when he signed on as manager and part time player for the 2012 season with fifth-tier 4. divisjon amateur team Mysen IF.

== Career statistics ==
Season	Club	Division	League		Cup		Continental		Total	
Season	Club	Division	Apps	Goals	Apps	Goals	Apps	Goals	Apps	Goals
2001	Molde	Tippeligaen	2	0	0	0	0	0	2	0
2002	Molde	Tippeligaen	0	0	0	0	0	0	0	0
2003	Molde	Tippeligaen	4	0	0	0	2	0	6	0
2004	Molde	Tippeligaen	2	0	3	0	0	0	5	0
2005	Molde	Tippeligaen	11	0	5	0	0	0	16	0
2006	Molde	Tippeligaen	2	0	1	0	0	0	3	0
2007	Molde	Adeccoligaen	0	0	0	0	0	0	0	0
2008	Molde	Tippeligaen	0	0	3	0	0	0	3	0
2009	Molde	Tippeligaen	19	0	5	0	0	0	24	0
2010	Molde	Tippeligaen	3	0	0	0	4	0	7	0
2011	Molde	Tippeligaen	0	0	1	0	0	0	1	0
Career Total			43	0	18	0	6	0	67	0
