= Fredrik Gustafson =

Swedish footballer

Personal information
- Full name: Fredrik Gustafson
- Date of birth: 5 June 1976 (age 50)
- Place of birth: Sweden
- Height: 1.82 m (6 ft 0 in)
- Position: Midfielder

Senior career*
| Years | Team | Apps | (Gls) |
| 1995–1998 | Öster | | |
| 1999–2001 | Halmstad | | |
| 2002–2004 | Molde | 37 | (1) |
| 2004–2008 | Öster | | |
- * Club domestic league appearances and goals as of 5 November 2012 (UTC)

Fredrik Gustafson (born 5 June 1976) is a Swedish retired football midfielder. He played for Öster, Halmstad and Molde.
