= Magnus Kihlberg =

Swedish footballer

Personal information
- Full name: Kjell Magnus Kihlberg
- Date of birth: 25 October 1973 (age 52)
- Place of birth: Örebro, Sweden
- Height: 1.81 m (5 ft 11 1/2 in)
- Position: Defensive midfielder

Senior career*
Years	Team	Apps	(Gls)
1990–1993	Karlslund		
1993–1995	Forward		
1995–1997	Örgryte		
1997–2002	Lillestrøm	129	(7)
2003–2005	Molde	66	(4)
2006	IFK Göteborg	21	(2)
2007	Aalesund	17	(3)
2008–2011	Örebro	108	(5)
- * Club domestic league appearances and goals as of 5 November 2012 (UTC)

Magnus Kihlberg (born 25 October 1973) is a Swedish former football midfielder. After playing for two local clubs, he joined Örgryte IS in 1995 before moving to Norwegian club Lillestrøm SK in 1997. He then moved on to Molde FK in 2002 before going back to Sweden and IFK Göteborg for the 2006 season. After just one season in Sweden he returned to Norway when he signed for Aalesunds FK in December 2006. Kihlberg ended his career with four seasons at Örebro, retiring in 2011.

== Clubs ==
- Karlslunds IF, BK Forward (-1995)
- Örgryte IS (1995–96)
- Lillestrøm SK (1997–2002)
- Molde FK (2002–05)
- IFK Göteborg (2006)
- Aalesunds FK (2007–08)
- Örebro SK (2008–11)
