= Erlend Ormbostad =

Norwegian footballer (born 1981)

Personal information
- Date of birth: 3 April 1981 (age 45)
- Height: 1.85 m (6 ft 1 in)
- Position: Defender

Senior career*
| Years | Team | Apps | (Gls) |
| 2000–2006 | Molde | 44 | (0) |
| 2006–2012 | Skeid | | |
| 2015–2016 | Årvoll | | |

International career
| 2001 | Norway U21 | 2 | (0) |
- * Club domestic league appearances and goals

Erlend Ormbostad (born 3 April 1981) is a retired Norwegian football defender.

He made his Eliteserien debut for Molde FK in August 2000 in a 7–1 thrashing of Bodø/Glimt. He later played several years in Skeid and briefly in Skeid's neighbor Årvoll.
