= Stig Arild Råket =

Norwegian footballer (born 1978)

Personal information
- Full name: Stig Arild Råket
- Date of birth: 6 April 1978 (age 48)
- Place of birth: Norway
- Position: Midfielder

Youth career
- Kristiansund FK
- Clausenengen

Senior career*
Years	Team	Apps	(Gls)
–1999	Clausenengen		
2000–2004	Molde	46	(3)
2005–2006	Bodø/Glimt	21	(1)
2006–2007	Kristiansund BK		
- * Club domestic league appearances and goals

Stig Arild Råket (born 6 April 1978) is a Norwegian footballer, with a past in Molde, Bodø/Glimt and Kristiansund BK.

== Career ==
Råket played 46 matches, scoring three goals, for Molde from 2000 to 2004 before he joined Bodø/Glimt in 2005. Halfway through the 2006-season, Bodø/Glimt experienced economic difficulties, and released a number of players including Råket. He then joined Kristiansund BK, where he played till he retired.

After his retirement, he worked for Molde at the youth academy, before he worked with youth development in Nordmøre og Romsdal Fotballkrets. In December 2010, Råket returned to Molde's academy and was also working as an assistant coach in Kristiansund BK.
