= Kai Røberg =

Norwegian footballer (born 1973)

Kai Røberg (born 30 November 1973) is a retired Norwegian football midfielder.

He started his youth career in Midsund IL, and was drafted into the senior team in 1990. In 1996 he moved on to Åndalsnes IF.

Joining from 2. divisjon team SK Træff, he played 48 times in the Norwegian Premier League for Molde FK between 2001 and 2005, (Note: Kai Røberg at the Norwegian Football Federation (in Norwegian)) and other clubs include Kristiansund BK.
