= Anders Hasselgård =

Norwegian footballer (born 1978)

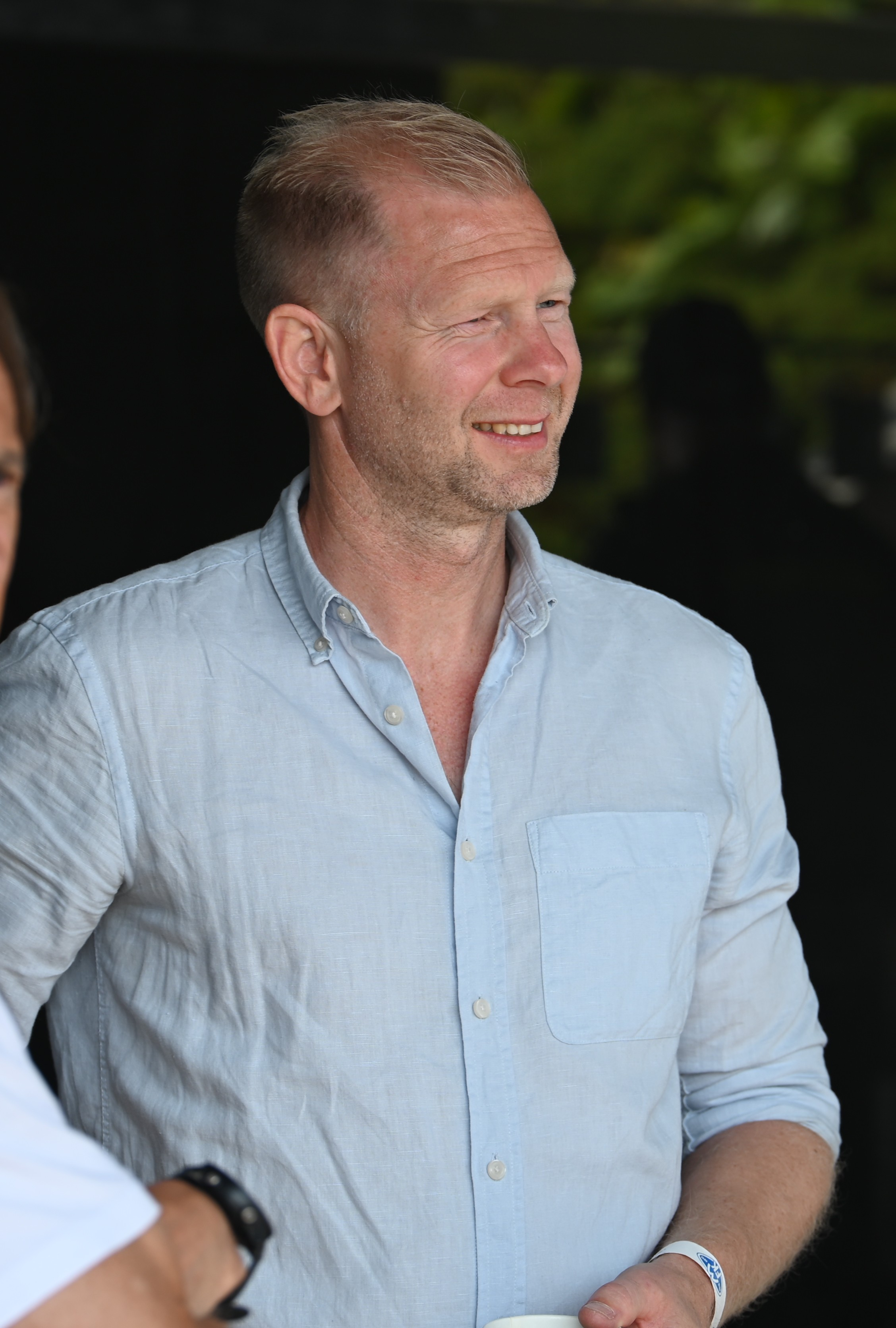

Personal information
- Date of birth: 1 February 1978 (age 48)
- Place of birth: Molde, Norway
- Height: 1.83 m (6 ft 0 in)
- Position: Midfielder

Senior career*
Years	Team	Apps	(Gls)
1995–2004	Molde	118	(12)

International career
1996	Norway U18	3	(1)
1998–1999	Norway U21	4	(1)
- * Club domestic league appearances and goals

Anders Hasselgård (born 1 February 1978) is a Norwegian former footballer who played as a midfielder for Molde in Tippeligaen. He later became a political scientist.

== Career ==
Hasselgård was born in Molde and played as a midfielder for Molde FK, where he spent most of his career. He made his debut in Tippeligaen in 1995, and played his last match in 2004. In total he played 112 games in Tippeligaen, scoring 12 goals. He also played for Lisleby, Eidsvåg and Lørenskog.

Hasselgård represented Norway at youth level, and was played three games and scored one goal for the under-18 team in 1996, before he was capped four times, scoring one goal, for the under-21 team in 1998 and 1999.

He later enrolled at the University of Oslo. Writing his master's degree, he was hired as a research fellow at the Norwegian Institute of International Affairs.
