= 2004 Odd Grenland season =

Odd Grenland
2004 season
- Manager: Arne Sandstø
- Stadium: Odd Stadion
- Tippeligaen: 8th
- Norwegian Cup: Third round
- UEFA Cup: First round
- Top goalscorer: League: Olivier Occéan (14); All: Olivier Occéan (17)

The 2004 season was Odd Grenland's 110th season in existence and the club's sixth consecutive season in the top flight of Norwegian football. In addition to the domestic league, Odd Grenland participated in this season's edition of the Norwegian Football Cup and the UEFA Cup.

== First-team squad ==
Squad at end of season

Note: Flags indicate national team as defined under FIFA eligibility rules; some limited exceptions apply. Players may hold more than one non-FIFA nationality.

No.	Pos.	Nation	Player
1	GK	NOR	Erik Holtan
3	MF	NOR	Anders Rambekk
4	DF	NOR	Ronny Deila
5	FW	NOR	Trond Viggo Toresen
6	MF	NOR	Morten Fevang
7	MF	NOR	Christian Flindt Bjerg
8	MF	NOR	Bent Inge Johnsen
9	FW	NOR	Sebastian Henriksson
10	FW	CAN	Olivier Occéan
11	FW	NOR	Morten Knutsen
12	GK	NOR	Rune Jarstein

No.	Pos.	Nation	Player
13	FW	NOR	Aksel Rød
14	GK	NOR	Kim Engen
15	DF	NOR	Alexander Aas
16	MF	NOR	Jan Tore Amundsen
17	DF	NOR	Jan Frode Nornes
18	DF	NOR	Espen Ruud
20	MF	NOR	Tarjei Dale
21	FW	NOR	Armin Sistek
23	DF	NOR	Brede Bomhoff
25	FW	NOR	Espen Hoff

== Competitions ==
=== Overall record ===
Competition	First match	Last match	Starting round	Final position	Record							
Competition	First match	Last match	Starting round	Final position	Pld	W	D	L	GF	GA	GD	Win %
Tippeligaen	12 April 2004	30 October 2004	Matchday 1	8th	26	9	8	9	47	44	+3	34.62
Norwegian Cup	5 May 2004	9 June 2004	First round	Third round	3	2	0	1	11	6	+5	66.67
UEFA Cup	12 August 2004	30 September 2004	Second qualifying round	First round	4	1	0	3	5	8	−3	25.00
Total					33	12	8	13	63	58	+5	36.36

Source: Competitions

=== Tippeligaen ===
==== Table ====
Pos	Team	Pld	W	D	L	GF	GA	GD	Pts	Qualification or relegation
6	Lyn	26	9	10	7	30	31	−1	37	
7	Lillestrøm	26	8	11	7	45	33	+12	35	
8	Odd Grenland	26	9	8	9	47	44	+3	35	
9	Viking	26	7	12	7	31	33	−2	33	Qualification for the UEFA Cup first qualifying round (Note: Viking qualified for the UEFA Cup first qualifying round through the UEFA Fair Play ranking award.)
10	Fredrikstad	26	9	5	12	42	54	−12	32	

Source: fotball.no
Rules for classification: 1) points; 2) goal difference; 3) number of goals scored.

==== Results summary ====
Overall								Home						Away					
Pld	W	D	L	GF	GA	GD	Pts	W	D	L	GF	GA	GD	W	D	L	GF	GA	GD
26	9	8	9	47	44	+3	35	6	4	3	29	23	+6	3	4	6	18	21	−3

==== Results by round ====
Round	1	2	3	4	5	6	7	8	9	10	11	12	13	14	15	16	17	18	19	20	21	22	23	24	25	26
Ground	H	A	H	A	H	A	H	A	H	A	A	H	A	A	H	A	H	A	H	A	H	A	H	H	A	H
Result	W	W	D	D	W	D	W	L	D	L	L	D	W	D	L	D	L	L	W	W	W	L	L	W	L	D
Position	2	1	2	2	2	2	2	2	2	4	8	8	4	6	8	8	8	9	8	8	6	8	8	7	8	8

A = Away; H = Home; W = Win; D = Draw; L = Loss

==== Matches ====
12 April 2004 1	Odd Grenland	2–0	Stabæk	Skien
18:00 CEST (UTC+2)	Henriksson 9' (pen.); Hoff 72'	Report		Stadium: Odd Stadion; Attendance: 7,350; Referee: Espen Berntsen

18 April 2004 2	Bodø/Glimt	0–2	Odd Grenland	Bodø
18:00 CEST (UTC+2)		Report	Fevang 82'; Occéan 87'	Stadium: Aspmyra Stadion; Attendance: 4,889; Referee: Brage Sandmoen

25 April 2004 3	Odd Grenland	0–0	Lyn	Skien
18:00 CEST (UTC+2)		Report		Stadium: Odd Stadion; Attendance: 5,320; Referee: Øyvind Alapnes

2 May 2004 4	Brann	1–1	Odd Grenland	Bergen
18:00 CEST (UTC+2)	Winters 23'	Report	Occéan 74'	Stadium: Brann Stadion; Attendance: 13,966; Referee: Brage Sandmoen

9 May 2004 5	Odd Grenland	5–2	Fredrikstad	Skien
18:00 CEST (UTC+2)	Occéan 27'; Henriksson 56' (pen.); Nornes 72'; Flindt Bjerg 78', 84'	Report	Söderstjerna 77', 88'	Stadium: Odd Stadion; Attendance: 6,705; Referee: Jon Skjervold

16 May 2004 6	Viking	2–2	Odd Grenland	Stavanger
18:00 CEST (UTC+2)	Kopteff 23'; Nevland 79'	Report	Flindt Bjerg 8'; Deila 45'	Stadium: Viking Stadion; Attendance: 15,150; Referee: Espen Berntsen

20 May 2004 7	Odd Grenland	3–2	Lillestrøm	Skien
18:00 CEST (UTC+2)	Flindt Bjerg 33', 46', 65'	Report	Sundgot 36'; Einarsson 78'	Stadium: Odd Stadion; Attendance: 6,890; Referee: Johnny Ditlefsen

23 May 2004 8	Rosenborg	2–0	Odd Grenland	Trondheim
18:00 CEST (UTC+2)	F. Johnsen 32'; Berg 47'	Report		Stadium: Lerkendal Stadion; Attendance: 15,402; Referee: Brage Sandmoen

1 June 2004 9	Odd Grenland	1–1	Molde	Skien
19:00 CEST (UTC+2)	Henriksson 66'	Report	Råket 9'	Stadium: Odd Stadion; Attendance: 4,750; Referee: Tom Henning Øvrebø

6 June 2004 10	Vålerenga	1–0	Odd Grenland	Oslo
18:00 CEST (UTC+2)	Rekdal 80'	Report		Stadium: Ullevaal Stadion; Attendance: 9,726; Referee: Kjell Alseth

13 June 2004 11	Tromsø	2–0	Odd Grenland	Tromsø
18:00 CEST (UTC+2)	Årst 56', 90+2'	Report		Stadium: Alfheim Stadion; Attendance: 5,069; Referee: Brage Sandmoen

20 June 2004 12	Odd Grenland	4–4	Sogndal	Skien
18:00 CEST (UTC+2)	Occéan 32', 51'; Henriksson 34'; Steenslid 53' (o.g.)	Report	Ødegaard 10', 35'; Flo 61'; Øren 89'	Stadium: Odd Stadion; Attendance: 3,050; Referee: Svein Oddvar Moen

27 June 2004 13	HamKam	2–4	Odd Grenland	Hamar
18:00 CEST (UTC+2)	Frigård 61'; Smeets 80'	Report	Fevang 33'; Occéan 35'; Hoff 67'; Rambekk 90'	Stadium: Briskeby Stadion; Attendance: 4,523; Referee: Jonny Ditlefsen

4 July 2004 14	Stabæk	0–0	Odd Grenland	Bærum
16:00 CEST (UTC+2)		Report		Stadium: Nadderud Stadion; Attendance: 3,273; Referee: Øyvind Alapnes

25 July 2004 15	Odd Grenland	3–5	Bodø/Glimt	Skien
18:00 CEST (UTC+2)	Henriksson 27'; Occéan 66'; Hoff 76'	Report	Hanssen 22'; Ludvigsen 35'; Berg 57'; Johansen 64'; Hansen 68'	Stadium: Odd Stadion; Attendance: 4,650; Referee: Per Ivar Staberg

1 August 2004 16	Lyn	2–2	Odd Grenland	Oslo
18:00 CEST (UTC+2)	Sørensen 77', 90'	Report	Occéan 23'; Dale 68'	Stadium: Ullevaal Stadion; Attendance: 2,026; Referee: Stig Rune Krokdal

8 August 2004 17	Odd Grenland	0–2	Brann	Skien
20:15 CEST (UTC+2)		Report	Kvisvik 27', 54'	Stadium: Odd Stadion; Attendance: 3,200; Referee: Tom Henning Øvrebø

22 August 2004 18	Fredrikstad	3–0	Odd Grenland	Fredrikstad
18:00 CEST (UTC+2)	Risholt 34', 63'; Hagen 56'	Report		Stadium: Fredrikstad Stadion; Attendance: 6,044; Referee: Espen Berntsen

29 August 2004 19	Odd Grenland	1–0	Viking	Skien
18:00 CEST (UTC+2)	Flindt Bjerg 22'	Report		Stadium: Odd Stadion; Attendance: 3,100; Referee: Jonny Ditlefsen

12 September 2004 20	Lillestrøm	0–4	Odd Grenland	Lillestrøm
20:15 CEST (UTC+2)		Report	Fevang 31'; Knutsen 43'; Occean 67'; Hoff 81'	Stadium: Åråsen Stadion; Attendance: 3,797; Referee: Tommy Skjerven

19 September 2004 21	Odd Grenland	3–0	Rosenborg	Skien
18:00 CEST (UTC+2)	Occean 37'; Flindt Bjerg 45'; Hoff 75'	Report		Stadium: Odd Stadion; Attendance: 7,816; Referee: Tom Henning Øvrebø

26 September 2004 22	Molde	2–1	Odd Grenland	Molde
18:00 CEST (UTC+2)	Hasselgård 38'; Kallio 50'	Report	Rudi 86' (o.g.)	Stadium: Molde Stadion; Attendance: 4,493; Referee: Brage Sandmoen

3 October 2004 23	Odd Grenland	2–4	Vålerenga	Skien
18:00 CEST (UTC+2)	Knutsen 16'; Fevang 18'	Report	Hagen 25'; Gashi 29'; Iversen 43', 70'	Stadium: Odd Stadion; Attendance: 6,822; Referee: Terje Hauge

18 October 2004 24	Odd Grenland	3–1	Tromsø	Skien
19:00 CEST (UTC+2)	Occéan 3'; Knutsen 68'; Sistek 88'	Report	Strand 32'	Stadium: Odd Stadion; Attendance: 3,116; Referee: Svein-Erik Edvartsen

24 October 2004 25	Sogndal	4–2	Odd Grenland	Sogndalsfjøra
18:00 CEST (UTC+2)	Øren 13'; Elvis 39'; Reda 52'; Ødegaard 90'	Report	Occéan 14'; Hoff 45'	Stadium: Fosshaugane; Attendance: 1,446; Referee: Kim Rune Borgersen

30 October 2004 26	Odd Grenland	2–2	HamKam	Skien
18:00 CET (UTC+1)	Occéan 76', 78'	Report	Haug 40'; Frigård 90'	Stadium: Odd Stadion; Attendance: 3,012; Referee: Per Ivar Staberg

=== Norwegian Cup ===
5 May 2004 First Round	Åssiden	1–6	Odd Grenland	Drammen
18:00 CEST (UTC+2)	Bråthen 87'	Report	Fevang 9'; Hoff 34', 80'; Johnsen 44'; Dale 46', 60'	Stadium: Marienlyst; Attendance: 100; Referee: Kristoffer Helgerud

26 May 2004 Second Round	Skarphedin	0–2	Odd Grenland	Bø
18:00 CEST (UTC+2)		Report	Sistek 54'; Ruud 77'	Stadium: Sandvoll Kunstgress; Attendance: 1,100; Referee: Anders Johansen

9 June 2004 Third Round	Haugesund	5–3 (a.e.t.)	Odd Grenland	Haugesund
18:00 CEST (UTC+2)	Wiken 20', 104'; Walde 53'; Magne Olsen 86'; Alsaker 100'	Report	Walde 3' (o.g.); Deila 57'; Rambekk 63'	Stadium: Haugesund Stadion; Attendance: 1,132; Referee: Kjetil Sælen

=== UEFA Cup ===
==== Second qualifying round ====
12 August 2004 First leg	Odd Grenland (Norway)	3–1	(Lithuania) Ekranas	Skien, Norway
19:00 CEST (UTC+2)	Occéan 46', 78'; Rambekk 66'	Report	Lukšys 38'	Stadium: Odd Stadion; Attendance: 2,097; Referee: Dejan Delević (Serbia and Montenegro)

26 August 2004 Second leg	Ekranas (Lithuania)	2–1 (3–4 agg.)	(Norway) Odd Grenland	Panevėžys, Lithuania
17:30 EEST (UTC+3)	Kavaliauskas 9'; Paulauskas 30'	Report	Knutsen 90'	Stadium: Aukštaitija Stadium; Attendance: 1,529; Referee: Darko Čeferin (Slovenia)

==== First round ====
16 September 2004 First leg	Odd Grenland (Norway)	0–1	(Netherlands) Feyenoord	Skien, Norway
19:00 CEST (UTC+2)		Report	Ono 74'	Stadium: Odd Stadion; Attendance: 4,125; Referee: Tomasz Milkuski (Poland)

30 September 2004 Second leg	Feyenoord (Netherlands)	4–0 (5–0 agg.)	(Norway) Odd Grenland	Rotterdam, Netherlands
20:30 CEST (UTC+2)	Bosschaart 5'; Kuyt 45'; Goor 73'; Kalou 90+1'	Report		Stadium: De Kuip; Attendance: 18,500; Referee: Andy D'Urso (England)
