= 2002 Norwegian Football Cup =

Norgesmesterskapet i fotball for herrer

Tournament details
- Country: Norway
- Teams: 128 (main competition)

Final positions
- Champions: Vålerenga (3rd title)
- Runners-up: Odd Grenland

Tournament statistics
- Matches played: 127
- Goals scored: 571 (4.5 per match)
- Top goal scorer: Harald Brattbakk (10)

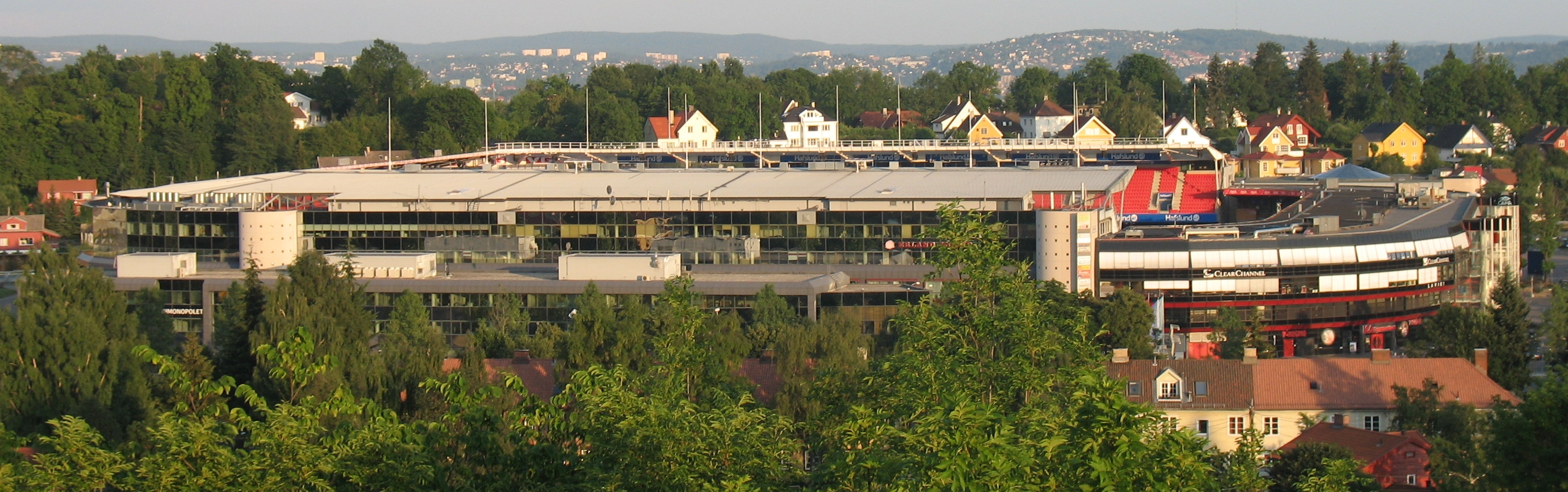
Ullevaal Stadion, Oslo - venue for the Norwegian Cup final

The 2002 Norwegian Football Cup was the 97th edition of the Norwegian Football Cup. Vålerenga won their 3rd Norwegian Championship title after defeating Odd Grenland in the final with the score 1–0. The final was played on Sunday 3 November at Ullevaal Stadion in Oslo.

Odd Grenland got to the final by beating Åssiden, Lyngdal, Bærum, Start, Strømsgodset and Stabæk.

Vålerenga reached the final by beating Vang, Eidsvold Turn, Lørenskog, Moss, Viking and Aalesund.

== Calendar ==
Below are the dates for each round as given by the official schedule:

Round	Date(s)	Number of fixtures	Clubs
First round	28–30 May 2002	64	128 → 64
Second round	12–13 June 2002	32	64 → 32
Third round	26–27 June 2002	16	32 → 16
Fourth round	7–8 August 2002	8	16 → 8
Quarter-finals	28–29 August 2002	4	8 → 4
Semi-finals	21–22 September 2002	2	4 → 2
Final	4 November 2002	1	2 → 1

== First round ==
The 49 winners from the Second Qualifying Round joined with 79 clubs from the Tippeligaen, First Division and Second Division in this round of the competition. These matches took place on 23, 28, 29 and 30 May 2002.

Team 1	Score	Team 2
23 May 2002
Ringsaker	0–8	HamKam
28 May 2002
Borg	1–2 (a.e.t.)	Strømsgodset
Vindbjart	1–3	Bryne
Vardeneset	2–3 (a.e.t.)	Vard
Narvik	6–2	Vesterålen
Salangen	1–5	Alta
29 May 2002
Sarpsborg FK	4–3	Kvik Halden
Østsiden	3–2	Sprint-Jeløy
Mercantile	2–3	Skeid
Frigg Oslo	1–5	Fredrikstad
Ullern	0–5	Moss
Fossum	1–4	Raufoss
Romerike	4–1	Larvik Fotball
Fjellhamar	2–3	Lørenskog
Ull/Kisa	0–2 (a.e.t.)	Kjelsås
Grue	0–4	Lillestrøm
Tynset	1–2	Kongsvinger
Elverum	2–0	Follo
Gjøvik-Lyn	0–3	Nybergsund
Vang	2–7	Vålerenga
Lom	1–3	Sogndal
Grindvoll	1–2 (a.e.t.)	Bærum
Jevnaker	0–2	Lillehammer
Hønefoss	8–0	KFUM Oslo
Åssiden	0–9	Odd Grenland
Ørn-Horten	2–1	Falk
Eik-Tønsberg	1–2	Pors Grenland
Notodden	1–4 (a.e.t.)	Tollnes
Langesund/Stathelle	0–6	Mandalskameratene
Jerv	1–0 (a.e.t.)	Tønsberg
Arendal	1–3	Start
Lyngdal	5–1	Vidar
Hana	1–4	Haugesund
Torvastad	0–6	Viking
Vedavåg Karmøy	3–0	Løv-Ham
Klepp	1–0	Nord
Åsane	6–0	Trane
Arna-Bjørnar	0–5	Fana
Os	0–2	Nest-Sotra
Hovding	2–1	Fyllingen
Fjøra	0–3	Brann
Tornado Maloy	2–3	Spjelkavik
Jotun	5–2	Førde
Velledalen/Ringen	0–6	Aalesund
Skarbøvik	1–4	Byåsen
Langevåg	0–2	Eidsvold Turn
Gossen	1–3	Molde
Træff	3–3 (4–2 p)	Clausenengen
Verdal	3–2	Melhus
Kolstad	3–5	Strindheim
Levanger	3–4	Ranheim
Mosjøen	2–11	Bodø/Glimt
Senja	0–4	Tromsdalen
Skånland/Omegn	0–15	Rosenborg
Mo	2–1	Steinkjer
Lofoten	4–1	Harstad
Valdres	1–1 (4–5 p)	Hammerfest
Skarp	5–2	Stålkameratene
Porsanger	1–7	Tromsø
30 May 2002
Sparta Sarpsborg	0–5	Lyn
Aurskog-Finstadbru	0–9	Stabæk
Oslo Øst	5–0	Fagerborg
Sandefjord	8–0	Flint
Hødd	8–1	Ørsta

== Second round ==
The 64 winners from the First Round took part in this stage of the competition. These matches took place on 12, 13 and 19 June 2002.

Team 1	Score	Team 2
12 June 2002
Alta	5–4	Skarp
Bodø/Glimt	9–0	Narvik
Brann	4–1	Hovding
Bryne	7–0	Vedavåg Karmøy
Byåsen	1–0	Verdal
Bærum	2–1	Ørn-Horten
Fana	4–2	Åsane
Lillehammer	1–3	Rosenborg
Hammerfest	0–9	Lyn
Haugesund	5–0	Vard Haugesund
Jerv	0–3	Sandefjord
Kongsvinger	0–4	Strømsgodset
Kjelsås	2–3 (a.e.t.)	Start
Lyngdal	0–4	Odd Grenland
Lørenskog	4–2	Romerike
Molde	7–0	Træff
Nest-Sotra	0–2	Aalesund
Nybergsund	3–2	HamKam
Pors Grenland	3–2	Oslo Øst
Ranheim	3–6 (a.e.t.)	Stabæk
Sarpsborg FK	1–4	Lillestrøm
Skeid	3–0	Elverum
Sogndal	4–0	Jotun
Spjelkavik	1–6	Hødd
Strindheim	2–3	Raufoss
Tollnes	0–2	Mandalskameratene
Tromsdalen	2–0	Mo
Tromsø	3–2	Lofoten
Viking	3–0	Klepp
13 June 2002
Fredrikstad	3–1	Hønefoss
Moss	6–0	Østsiden
19 June 2002
Eidsvold Turn	0–5	Vålerenga

== Third round ==
The 32 winners from the Second Round took part in this stage of the competition. These matches took place on 26 and 27 June 2002.

Team 1	Score	Team 2
26 June 2002
Lillestrøm	0–1	Skeid
Vålerenga	5–0	Lørenskog
Stabæk	3–0	Nybergsund
Raufoss	2–2 (3–4 p)	Bryne
Strømsgodset	1–0	Fredrikstad
Sandefjord	0–1	Moss
Odd Grenland	2–0	Bærum
Start	1–0 (a.e.t.)	Haugesund
Aalesund	5–0	Sogndal
Hødd	1–0	Molde
Tromsø	2–0	Tromsdalen
Alta	1–6	Bodø/Glimt
27 June 2002
Lyn	3–2	Pors Grenland
Mandalskameratene	0–2	Viking
Fana	0–2 (a.e.t.)	Brann
Rosenborg	4–0	Byåsen

== Fourth round ==
The 16 winners from the Third Round took part in this stage of the competition. These matches took place on 7 and 8 August 2002.

7 August 2002
18:00 CEST (UTC+2)

Bodø/Glimt	1–5	Tromsø
Sæternes 62'	Report	Kjølner 21' (o.g.); Christensen 26'; M. G. Pedersen 40' (pen.), 45'; Nilsen 65'

Aspmyra Stadion, Bodø
Attendance: 2,861
Referee: Kjell Alseth

7 August 2002
18:00 CEST (UTC+2)

Bryne	1–2	Lyn
Lemsalu 60'	Report	Sigurðsson 12' (pen.); Hanssen 62'

Bryne Stadion, Bryne
Attendance: 2,351
Referee: Roy Helge Olsen

7 August 2002
18:00 CEST (UTC+2)

Odd Grenland	4–1	Start
Deila 23' (pen.); Wiig 45'; Fevang 59'; Solli 89'	Report	Knutsen 12'

Odd Stadion, Skien
Attendance: 2,425
Referee: Jonny Ditlefsen

7 August 2002
18:00 CEST (UTC+2)

Skeid	1–5	Stabæk
Theting 15'	Report	Gudmundsson 9'; Andresen 49'; Michelsen 64'; Sand 68'; Wilhelmsson 79'

Voldsløkka Stadion, Oslo
Attendance: 907
Referee: Bjørn Gravdal

7 August 2002
18:00 CEST (UTC+2)

Viking	2–0	Rosenborg
Dahl 11'; Pereira 77'	Report

Viking Stadion, Stavanger
Attendance: 6,010
Referee: Roy Helge Olsen

8 August 2002
18:00 CEST (UTC+2)

Brann	2–2 (a.e.t.)	Aalesund
Furuseth 14'	Report	Hansen 68'
Penalties
Wassberg (penalty scored); Furuseth (penalty scored); Knudsen (penalty scored); Solís (penalty scored); Knarvik (penalty scored); Walltin (penalty missed)	5–6	(penalty scored) Fredriksen; (penalty scored) Fagermo; (penalty scored) Hansen; (penalty scored) Sandø; (penalty scored) Mathiesen; (penalty scored) Melland

Brann Stadion, Bergen
Attendance: 2,661
Referee: Brage Sandmoen

8 August 2002
18:00 CEST (UTC+2)

Moss	2–2 (a.e.t.)	Vålerenga
Wehrman 21'; Olofsson 24'	Report	Haraldsen 7' dos Santos 25'
Penalties
Tangen (penalty scored); Wehrman (penalty scored); B. E. Olsen (penalty missed); Kristiansen (penalty scored); Olofsson (penalty scored)	4–5	(penalty scored) Belsvik; (penalty scored) Kah; (penalty scored) Levernes; (penalty scored) Bolthof; (penalty scored) Grahn

Melløs Stadion, Moss
Attendance: 2,557
Referee: Jon Skjervold

8 August 2002
18:00 CEST (UTC+2)

Strømsgodset	2–1	Hødd
L. Olsen 30'; Sørum 79'	Report	Myklebust 36'

Marienlyst Stadion, Drammen
Attendance: 1,394
Referee: Frode Kvam

== Quarter-finals ==
28 August 2002
17:30 CEST (UTC+2)

Aalesund	2–0	Tromsø
Hoseth 97', 108'	Report

Kråmyra Stadion, Ålesund
Attendance: 5,900
Referee: Tom Henning Øvrebø

28 August 2002
19:00 CEST (UTC+2)

Odd Grenland	4–3	Strømsgodset
Hoff 10', 59'; Bjerg 63'; Larsen 87'	Report	Flo 42', 73'; Evensen 90'

Odd Stadion, Skien
Attendance: 3,520
Referee: Kjell Alseth

29 August 2002
20:30 CEST (UTC+2)

Vålerenga	3–1	Viking
Kah 73'; Hagen 87'; Belsvik 88'	Report	Nevland 86'

Ullevaal Stadion, Oslo
Attendance: 3,629
Referee: Rune Pedersen

11 September 2002
20:00 CEST (UTC+2)

Lyn	2–2 (a.e.t.)	Stabæk
Sundgot 23'; Sigurðsson 97'	Report	Stenersen 3'; T. Guðmundsson 120'
Penalties
J. Guðmundsson (penalty scored); Hanssen (penalty scored); Lagerlöf (penalty scored); Sigurðsson (penalty scored); Berntsen (penalty missed); Lustü (penalty missed)	4–5	(penalty scored) Holter; (penalty scored) Baldvinsson; (penalty missed) Muri; (penalty scored) Wilhelmsson; (penalty scored) Andresen; (penalty scored) I. A. Olsen

Ullevaal Stadion, Oslo
Attendance: 2,716
Referee: Tommy Skjerven

== Semi-finals ==
21 September 2002
15:00 CEST (UTC+2)

Vålerenga	2–0	Aalesund
Grahn 67'; Kah 84'	Report

Ullevaal Stadion, Oslo
Attendance: 11,301
Referee: Roy Helge Olsen

22 September 2002
15:00 CEST (UTC+2)

Stabæk	0–2	Odd Grenland
	Report	Wiig 9'; Nornes 76'

Nadderud Stadion, Bærum
Attendance: 4,292
Referee: Rune Pedersen

== Final ==
3 November 2002
13:15 CET (UTC+1)

Odd Grenland	0–1	Vålerenga
	Report	Levernes 5'

Ullevaal Stadion, Oslo
Attendance: 25,481
Referee: Tommy Skjerven (Kaupanger)
