= 1997 Norwegian Football Cup =

Norgesmesterskapet i fotball for herrer

Tournament details
- Country: Norway
- Teams: 128 (main competition)

Final positions
- Champions: Vålerenga (2nd title)
- Runners-up: Strømsgodset

Tournament statistics
- Matches played: 127

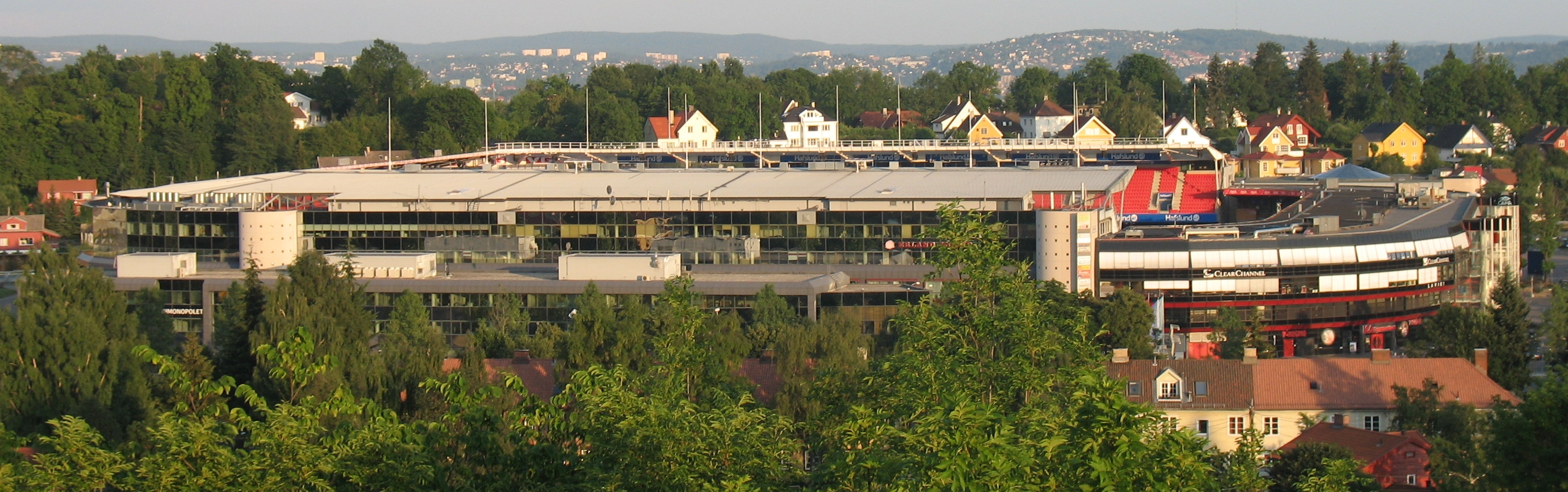
Ullevaal Stadion, Oslo - venue for the Norwegian Cup final

The 1997 Norwegian Football Cup was the 92nd edition of the Norwegian Football Cup. The 1997 Norwegian Football Cup was won by the second-tier side Vålerenga, after they defeated Strømsgodset in the final with the score 4–2.

== Calendar ==
Below are the dates for each round as given by the official schedule:

Round	Date(s)	Number of fixtures	Clubs
First round	20–22 May 1997	64	128 → 64
Second round	10–11 June 1997	32	64 → 32
Third round	25 June 1997	16	32 → 16
Fourth round	9–10 July 1997	8	16 → 8
Quarter-finals	6 August 1997	4	8 → 4
Semi-finals	24–27 September 1997	4	4 → 2
Final	26 October 1997	1	2 → 1

== First round ==
Team 1	Score	Team 2
20 May 1997
Larvik Turn	1–3	Snøgg
21 May 1997
Averøykameratene	1–0	Åndalsnes
Bremnes	2–1	Nest-Sotra
Gevir Bodø	6–0	Mo
Hana	0–6	Bryne
Holter	1–0	Sprint-Jeløy
Jevnaker	3–4 (a.e.t.)	Bærum
Liv/Fossekallen	2–1	Ski
Orkanger	2–1	Nidelv
Pors Grenland	6–3	Sørfjell
Raufoss	0–1	Mjøndalen
Verdal	0–3	Ranheim
Ørn-Horten	1–2	Runar
Ørsta	1–2	Stryn
Aalesund	0–2	Volda
Ålgård	1–3	Flekkefjord
Åmot	1–3	Skeid
Åsane	4–0	Florø
Åssiden	0–1	Skjetten
22 May 1997
Alta	8–3	Skjervøy
Asker	0–3	Stabæk
Aurskog/Finstadbru	2–7	Drøbak/Frogn
Donn	1–5	Start
Elverum	0–3	Vålerenga
Fana	1–2	Vadmyra
Figgjo	0–7	Viking
Finnsnes	0–2	Harstad
Flint	2–6	Strømsgodset
Fredrikstad	1–1 (5–4 p)	Grei
Frigg	0–2	Mercantile
Hammerfest	2–3	Porsanger
Holmen	1–2	Eik-Tønsberg
Jerv	3–2	Vigør
Jotun	0–1	Sogndal
Kjelsås	0–1	Abildsø
Kleppestø	1–4	Brann
Kolbotn	0–2	Lyn
Kolstad	4–2	Stjørdals/Blink
Kristiansund	0–3	Molde
Lofoten	4–0	Mjølner/Narvik
Lyngen/Karnes	1–4	Tromsø
Lørenskog	4–3	Gjøvik-Lyn
Mosjøen	3–1	Namsos
Nardo	3–1 (a.e.t.)	Steinkjer
Nybergsund	1–3	HamKam
Radøy	4–7 (a.e.t.)	Fyllingen
Råde	0–2	Moss
Selbak	1–2	Sarpsborg FK
Singsås	0–9	Rosenborg
Skarbøvik	0–1	Hødd
Skjold	0–8	Haugesund
Stord	3–4 (a.e.t.)	Løv-Ham
Strindheim	2–0	National
Strømmen	3–0	Faaberg
Stålkameratene	0–3	Bodø/Glimt
Sørumsand	0–6	Lillestrøm
Tranabakkan	0–5	Byåsen
Tromsdalen	5–1	Silsand
Ullern	3–2	Østsiden
Urædd	0–2	Odd Grenland
Vang	0–5	Kongsvinger
Vard Haugesund	1–1 (6–5 p)	Odda
Varhaug	1–2	Eiger
Vidar	4–0	Vedavåg

== Second round ==
Team 1	Score	Team 2
10 June 1997
Eiger	1–2	Viking
Fyllingen	5–2	Åsane
Moss	2–0	Strømmen
11 June 1997
Abildsø	0–1	Vålerenga
Bodø/Glimt	3–0	Mosjøen
Bremnes	1–4	Haugesund
Bryne	6–3	Vidar
Byåsen	4–2	Kolstad
Drøbak/Frogn	3–1	Holter
Flekkefjord	1–3	Start
HamKam	2–1	Ullern
Harstad	1–0	Lofoten
Kongsvinger	4–1	Lørenskog
Lyn	4–0	Strindheim
Løv-Ham	2–6	Vard Haugesund
Mercantile	0–1 (a.e.t.)	Skeid
Mjøndalen	0–2	Strømsgodset
Nardo	1–3	Rosenborg
Odd Grenland	5–1	Jerv
Orkanger	0–2	Averøykameratene
Porsanger	0–3	Tromsø
Ranheim	1–4	Gevir Bodø
Runar	1–1 (5–6 p)	Pors Grenland
Sarpsborg FK	1–1 (3–4 p)	Fredrikstad
Skjetten	1–3	Eik-Tønsberg
Snøgg	1–8	Lillestrøm
Sogndal	5–0	Liv/Fossekallen
Stabæk	2–1	Bærum
Stryn	1–0	Molde
Tromsdalen	4–6	Alta
Vadmyra	1–3	Brann
Volda	0–3	Hødd

== Third round ==
Team 1	Score	Team 2
25 June 1997
Alta	1–6	Bodø/Glimt
Averøykameratene	0–5	Rosenborg
Brann	11–0	Vard Haugesund
Eik-Tønsberg	1–1 (4–3 p)	Kongsvinger
Fredrikstad	2–0	Lyn
Gevir Bodø	0–2	Vålerenga
Haugesund	4–0	Bryne
Hødd	0–2	Moss
Lillestrøm	3–0	HamKam
Pors Grenland	2–3 (a.e.t.)	Stabæk
Skeid	1–2 (a.e.t.)	Byåsen
Start	3–2	Odd Grenland
Stryn	1–4	Sogndal
Strømsgodset	5–4 (a.e.t.)	Drøbak/Frogn
Tromsø	8–0	Harstad
Viking	4–1	Fyllingen

== Fourth round ==
9 July 1997

Bodø/Glimt	5–0	Start
Bjørkan 17', 52', 61'; Staurvik 71'; Sørensen 88'

Aspmyra Stadion, Bodø
Attendance: 1,976
Referee: Terje Hauge

9 July 1997

Eik-Tønsberg	2–2 (a.e.t.)	Haugesund
Kihle 3' (pen.); Bye-Andersen 43'		Helgeland 64'; Johansen 65'
Penalties
Kihle (penalty scored); Bratvold (penalty missed); Nornes (penalty missed)	1–4	(penalty scored) Johansson; (penalty scored) Mellemstrand; (penalty scored) Jensen; (penalty scored) Larsen

Tønsberg Gressbane, Tønsberg
Attendance: 2,335
Referee: Frode Kvam

9 July 1997

Rosenborg	5–3 (a.e.t.)	Lillestrøm
Dahlum 77', 120'; Jakobsen 80', 107' (pen.); Brattbakk 114'		Strandli 28' (pen.); Wålemark 60'; Frigård 102'

Lerkendal Stadion, Trondheim
Attendance: 11,021
Referee: Sven Kjellbrott

9 July 1997

Sogndal	5–0	Tromsø
Hillestad 8' (pen.); Andreassen 37', 67'; Andersen 64'; Ja. Flo 72'

Fosshaugane, Sogndalsfjøra
Attendance: 1,122
Referee: Jon Skjervold

9 July 1997

Viking	4–0	Fredrikstad
Månsson 19', 50'; Skogheim 43'; Andresen 73'

Stavanger Stadion, Stavanger
Attendance: 1,707
Referee: Ivar Ansgar Eriksen

10 July 1997

Byåsen	0–3	Strømsgodset
		Tanasić 15'; Jo. Flo 18'; Hagen 37'

Lerkendal Stadion, Trondheim
Attendance: 1,267
Referee: Johnny Ditlefsen

10 July 1997

Moss	0–2	Stabæk
		Grimstad 8'; Sigurðsson 90'

Melløs Stadion, Moss
Attendance: 2,035
Referee: Kjell Alseth

10 July 1997

Vålerenga	3–0	Brann
Kaasa 53', 73'; Kuvicek 75'

Bislett Stadion, Oslo
Attendance: 17,933
Referee: Roy Helge Olsen

== Quarter-finals ==
6 August 1997

Haugesund	2–3 (a.e.t.)	Strømsgodset
Helgeland 12'; Wee 47'		Hagen 70'; Olsen 83', 94'

Haugesund Stadion, Haugesund
Attendance: 5,267
Referee: Harald Hansen

6 August 1997

Rosenborg	2–3 (a.e.t.)	Viking
Bergdølmo 16'; Rushfeldt 37'		Skogheim 19', 64'; Fuglestad 114' (pen.)

Lerkendal Stadion, Trondheim
Attendance: 13,751
Referee: Tom Henning Øvrebø

6 August 1997

Stabæk	1–3	Bodø/Glimt
Stavrum 26'		Bjørkan 61', 63'; T. V. Hansen 85'

Nadderud Stadion, Bærum
Attendance: 2,056
Referee: Frode Kvam

6 August 1997

Vålerenga	3–2	Sogndal
Haug 23' (pen.); Levernes 29'; Carew 59'		Johansen 5'; T. Hansen 32'

Bislett Stadion, Oslo
Attendance: 10,046
Referee: Rune Pedersen

== Semi-finals ==
=== First leg ===
24 September 1997

Bodø/Glimt	2–1	Strømsgodset
Staurvik 38' (pen.); Johnsen 48'		Kihle 63'

Aspmyra Stadion, Bodø
Attendance: 2,707
Referee: Roy Helge Olsen

24 September 1997

Viking	1–4	Vålerenga
Owolabi 61'		Carew 32', 63', 76'; Lunde 89'

Stavanger Stadion, Stavanger
Attendance: 7,057
Referee: Tore Hollung

=== Second leg ===
27 September 1997

Vålerenga	1–1	Viking
Carew 5'		Skogheim 51'

Bislett Stadion, Oslo
Attendance: 11,214
Referee: Terje Hauge

Vålerenga won 5–2 on aggregate.

28 September 1997

Strømsgodset	3–1	Bodø/Glimt
Flo 11', 70'; Nyan 26'		Sørensen 75'

Marienlyst Stadion, Drammen
Attendance: 6,959
Referee: Rune Pedersen

Strømsgodset won 4–3 on aggregate.

== Final ==
26 October 1997
13:15 CET (UTC+1)

Vålerenga	4–2	Strømsgodset
Kaasa 4'; Haug 51'; Musæus 63'; Levernes 65'	Report	Tanasić 53', 56'

Ullevaal Stadion, Oslo
Attendance: 22,678
Referee: Roy Helge Olsen (Harstad)
