= 1997 Norwegian Football Cup final =

- Event: 1997 Norwegian Football Cup
Vålerenga	Strømsgodset
4	2
- Date: 26 October 1997
- Venue: Ullevaal Stadion, Oslo
- Referee: Roy Helge Olsen
- Attendance: 22,678

The 1997 Norwegian Football Cup final was the final match of the 1997 Norwegian Football Cup, the 92nd season of the Norwegian Football Cup, the premier Norwegian football cup competition organized by the Football Association of Norway (NFF). The match was played on 26 October 1997 at the Ullevaal Stadion in Oslo, and was contested between the First Division side Vålerenga and the Tippeligaen side Strømsgodset. Vålerenga defeated Strømsgodset 4–2 to claim the Norwegian Cup for a second time in their history.

== Route to the final ==
Vålerenga			Round	Strømsgodset		
Elverum	3–0 (A)		Round 1	Flint	6–2 (A)	
Abildsø	1–0 (A)		Round 2	Mjøndalen	2–0 (A)	
Gevir Bodø	2–0 (A)		Round 3	Drøbak/Frogn	5–4 aet (H)	
Brann	3–0 (H)		Round 4	Byåsen	3–0 (A)	
Sogndal	3–2 (H)		Quarterfinal	Haugesund	3–2 aet (A)	
Viking	4–1 (A)	1–1 (H)	Semifinal	Bodø/Glimt	1–2 (A)	3–1 (H)

== Match ==
=== Details ===
26 October 1997
13:15 CET (UTC+1)

Vålerenga	4–2	Strømsgodset
Kaasa 4'; Haug 51'; Musæus 63'; Levernes 65'	Report	Tanasić 53', 56'

Ullevaal Stadion, Oslo
Attendance: 22,678
Referee: Roy Helge Olsen (Harstad)

Vålerenga	Strømsgodset

Vålerenga:
GK	26	(Norway) Tore Krogstad
DF	5	(Norway) Thomas Berntsen		(substituted off) 84'
DF	19	(Norway) Knut Henry Haraldsen
DF	4	(Norway) Fredrik Kjølner	(yellow card) 33'
DF	15	(Norway) Joachim Walltin
MF	17	(Norway) Bjørn Viljugrein
MF	7	(Norway) Bjørn Arild Levernes		(substituted off) 87'
MF	8	(Norway) Espen Haug		(substituted off) 88'
MF	13	(Norway) Espen Musæus
FW	11	(Norway) Kjell Roar Kaasa
FW	25	(Norway) John Carew
Substitutions:
DF	2	(Norway) Viggo Strømme		(substituted in) 84'
DF	3	(Norway) Kent Karlsen		(substituted in) 88'
MF	18	(Norway) Svein Erik Pettersen		(substituted in) 87'
Coach:
(Norway) Vidar Davidsen

Strømsgodset:
GK	1	(Norway) Glenn Arne Hansen
DF	2	(Norway) Espen Horsrud
DF	4	(Russia) Dmitri Barannik	(yellow card) 65'
DF	3	(Norway) Vegard Hansen
DF	21	(Norway) Pål Skistad
MF	9	(Norway) Rune Hagen
MF	7	(Norway) Sander Solberg
MF	8	(The Gambia) Ousman Nyan		(substituted off) 70'
MF	17	(Federal Republic of Yugoslavia) Marko Tanasić		(substituted off) 70'
FW	15	(Norway) Lasse Olsen
FW	11	(Norway) Jostein Flo		(substituted off) 78'
Substitutions:
FW	14	(Norway) Hans Erik Ødegaard		(substituted in) 70'
MF	23	(Norway) Morten Kihle		(substituted in) 70'
FW	10	(Norway) Thomas Røed		(substituted in) 78'
Coach:
(Norway) Dag Vidar Kristoffersen
