= Krogstad =

Krogstad is a Norwegian surname. It derives from Krókr, a crooked person, and staðr, a farm.

== People ==
- Fredrik Krogstad, Norwegian footballer
- Jonas Krogstad, Norwegian footballer
- Marit Trætteberg née Krogstad, Norwegian chemist
- Rangdi Krogstad, Norwegian politician
- Tore Krogstad, Norwegian goalkeeper

== In fiction ==
- Nils Krogstad in A Doll's House
