= Kent Carlsson (disambiguation) =

Kent Carlsson is a Swedish former tennis player.

Kent Carlsson or Carlson may also refer to:

- Kent Carlson (born 1962), ice hockey player
- Kent Carlsson (sailor) (born 1951), Swedish Olympic sailor
- Kent Carlsson (politician) (1962–1993), Swedish politician

== See also ==
- Kent Karlsen (born 1973), Norwegian footballer
- Kent Karlsson (born 1945), Swedish footballer
