= Svein Erik Pettersen =

Norwegian footballer (born 1966)

Personal information
- Date of birth: 26 June 1966 (age 60)
- Position: Defender

Youth career
- Bærum

Senior career*
Years	Team	Apps	(Gls)
1984–1989	Bærum		
1990–1992	Mjøndalen		
1993–1997	Vålerenga		
1998–2001	Asker		
2002–2004	Vollen		

Managerial career
- 1998–: Asker (player-assistant)
- 2002–2006: Vollen (player-coach)
- 2007: Asker (assistant)
- * Club domestic league appearances and goals

Svein Erik Pettersen (born 1966) is a retired Norwegian footballer who played as a defender. He played in Eliteserien for Mjøndalen and Vålerenga, and won the Norwegian Football Cup for the latter. After his active career, he coached local clubs.

== Career ==
Pettersen grew up in the club Bærum SK and was moved up to the first team in 1984. He also played basketball as a teenager. In both 1988 and 1989, other clubs wanted to sign him, and among the three candidates ahead of the 1990 season, Lyn, Strømsgodset and Mjøndalen, Pettersen chose Mjøndalen. In a transfer dispute between Bærum who wanted 140,000 kr and Mjøndalen who offered 30,000 kr, the Football Association set the fee to 70,000.

When the 1990 season had concluded, the local newspaper gave Pettersen the Player of the Year award in Mjøndalen, ahead of Pål Skistad. In the winter of 1991, Pettersen went on a week-long trial with Wolverhampton Wanderers. Pettersen admitted that a transfer was probably not on the books.

In 1991, Mjøndalen won promotion to the 1992 Eliteserien, which became Pettersen's first season at the highest tier. Wrote Verdens Gang, Mjøndalen's play would "be built up around Svein Erik Pettersen".

It was speculated in a transfer to Jevnaker IF in 1992 and 1993. In 1992, Pettersen stated that he was "tired of football, has had bad seasons and lost self-confidence. I think Jevnaker as a club can straighten out the bad feelings". Moreover, his brother-in-law Jørn Gruer joined Jevnaker. After the 1992 season, however, Pettersen was announced as a new player by Vålerenga. He represented the team in Eliteserien from 1994 through 1996, when Vålerenga were relegated. (Note: Svein Erik Pettersen at the Norwegian Football Federation (in Norwegian))

In 1997 he won the Norwegian cup with Vålerenga, appearing in the cup final. He was one in Vålerenga after that, and was wanted by several clubs on the third tier. Jevnaker IF was yet again among them, as well as Liv/Fossekallen, but Pettersen seemed close to rejoining Bærum SK when he decided to move to Asker. He would serve as playing assistant coach under Kaz Sokolowski. His family situation, having moved to Asker and having recently had a son, contributed to the decision.

By the age of 38, Pettersen was the playing head coach of a smaller club in Asker Municipality, Vollen. In 2006, his team met Asker in the Norwegian cup preliminaries. When Pettersen left Vollen, he was eventually persuaded to become assistant manager of Asker.

== Personal life ==
Pettersen married in October 1992.
