= Gudbrand Ensrud =

Norwegian footballer (born 1977)

Personal information
- Date of birth: 21 June 1977 (age 49)
- Height: 1.94 m (6 ft 4 in)
- Position: Defender

Youth career
- Fjellhamar
- –1996: Lillestrøm

Senior career*
Years	Team	Apps	(Gls)
1996	Lillestrøm	2	(0)
1997–1999	Skjetten		
2000–2001	Lyn	35	(0)
2002–2004	Hønefoss	83	(4)
2005	SW Bregenz		
2005–2006	Chemnitzer FC	22	(0)
2007–2009	Moss	13	(0)

Managerial career
- 2010–2011: Drøbak-Frogn (assistant)
- 2012: Fjellhamar (assistant)
- * Club domestic league appearances and goals

Gudbrand Ensrud (born 21 June 1977) is a retired Norwegian football defender. Besides Norway, he has played in Austria and Germany.

He started his youth career in Fjellhamar FK and eventually continued to Lillestrøm. He made his Eliteserien debut in July 1996 against Vålerenga. After one more game for Lillestrøm he went on to Skjetten SK. In 2000 he joined Lyn and won promotion to 2001 Eliteserien, after which season he played three years for Hønefoss. Tenures in Austrian SW Bregenz and German Regionalliga club Chemnitzer FC followed.

After playing the 2007 1. divisjon for Moss he missed two years to knee injury.Already in the summer of 2008 he was advised to retire. In 2010 he instead became assistant manager of Drøbak-Frogn IL under Frode Birkeland, and in 2012 assistant manager of Fjellhamar FK under Jan Aksel Opsahl Odden.
