= 2002 Norwegian Football Cup final =

- Event: 2002 Norwegian Football Cup
Odd Grenland	Vålerenga
0	1
- Date: 3 November 2002
- Venue: Ullevaal Stadion, Oslo
- Referee: Tommy Skjerven
- Attendance: 25,481

The 2002 Norwegian Football Cup final was the final match of the 2002 Norwegian Football Cup, the 97th season of the Norwegian Football Cup, the premier Norwegian football cup competition organized by the Football Association of Norway (NFF). The match was played on 3 November 2002 at the Ullevaal Stadion in Oslo, and opposed two Tippeligaen sides Odd Grenland and Vålerenga. Vålerenga defeated Odd Grenland 1–0 to claim the Norwegian Cup for a third time in their history.

== Route to the final ==
Odd Grenland			Round	Vålerenga		
Åssiden	A	9–0	Round 1	Vang	A	7–2
Lyngdal	A	4–0	Round 2	Eidsvold Turn	A	5–0
Bærum	H	2–0	Round 3	Lørenskog	H	5–0
Start	H	3–1	Round 4	Moss	A	2–2 (5–4 p)
Strømsgodset	H	4–3	Quarterfinal	Viking	H	3–2
Stabæk	A	2–0	Semifinal	Aalesund	A	2–0

== Match ==
=== Details ===
3 November 2002
13:15 CET (UTC+1)

Odd Grenland	0–1	Vålerenga
	Report	Levernes 5'

Ullevaal Stadion, Oslo
Attendance: 25,481
Referee: Tommy Skjerven (Kaupanger)

Odd Grenland	Vålerenga

Odd Grenland:
GK	1	(Norway) Erik Holtan (c)
DF	15	(Norway) Alexander Aas
DF	4	(Norway) Ronny Deila
DF	17	(Norway) Jan Frode Nornes
DF	3	(Norway) Anders Rambekk
MF	6	(Norway) Morten Fevang
MF	8	(Norway) Bent Inge Johnsen		(substituted off) 74'
MF	7	(Denmark) Christian Flindt-Bjerg	(yellow card) 41'	(substituted off) 68'
FW	11	(Netherlands) Edwin van Ankeren
FW	19	(Norway) Martin Wiig		(substituted off) 70'
FW	13	(Norway) Jan Gunnar Solli
Substitutions:
GK	12	(Norway) Rune Jarstein
DF	2	(Norway) Lars Lien
FW	9	(Norway) Sveinung Fjeldstad		(substituted in) 70'
FW	10	(Italy) Michele Di Piedi
MF	16	(Norway) Jan Tore Amundsen
DF	23	(Norway) Brede Bomhoff		(substituted in) 74'
FW	25	(Norway) Espen Hoff		(substituted in) 68'
Coach:
(Norway) Arne Sandstø

Vålerenga:
GK	1	(Norway) Øyvind Bolthof
DF	6	(Norway) Freddy dos Santos
DF	5	(Norway) Erik Hagen
DF	19	(Norway) Knut Henry Haraldsen
DF	21	(Norway) Tom Henning Hovi (c)	(yellow card) 44'
MF	8	(Norway) Pa-Modou Kah		(substituted off) 48'
MF	10	(Norway) Kjetil Rekdal
MF	27	(Norway) David Hanssen
MF	16	(Sweden) Johan Arneng
FW	7	(Norway) Bjørn Arild Levernes		(substituted off) 74'
FW	22	(Sweden) Tobias Grahn	(yellow card) 73'	(substituted off) 89'
Substitutions:
GK	30	(Norway) Morten Bakke
DF	2	(Norway) Ronny Døhli		(substituted in) 48'
FW	13	(Norway) Thomas Holm		(substituted in) 74'
MF	14	(Norway) Stian Ohr
FW	23	(Norway) Knut Hovel Heiaas
MF	24	(Norway) Petter Belsvik
FW	25	(Estonia) Kristen Viikmäe		(substituted in) 89'
Coach:
(Norway) Kjetil Rekdal
