= Henrik Melland =

Norwegian footballer (born 2005)

Personal information
- Full name: Henrik Molvær Melland
- Date of birth: 29 March 2005 (age 21)
- Height: 1.85 m (6 ft 1 in)
- Position: Midfielder

Team information
- Current team: Lillestrøm
- Number: 16

Youth career
- –2019: SIF/Hessa
- 2020: Aalesund

Senior career*
Years	Team	Apps	(Gls)
2021–2026	Aalesund	69	(12)
2026–	Lillestrøm	1	(0)

International career^{‡}
2021	Norway U16	3	(0)
2022	Norway U17	1	(0)
2023	Norway U18	13	(0)
2024	Norway U19	1	(0)
2025	Norway U20	3	(0)
- * Club domestic league appearances and goals as of 29 August 2026 ‡ National team caps and goals as of 29 August 2026

Henrik Melland (born 29 March 2005) is a Norwegian footballer who plays as a midfielder for Lillestrøm.

He is a son of footballer Bjørn Erik Melland. As Henrik Melland started his youth career in SIF/Hessa, he joined Aalesunds FK in 2020, where his father was the director of sports. After spending time in the academy, Henrik Melland made his senior cup debut in July 2021 against Træff followed by his 1. divisjon debut in August against Raufoss. Following Aalesund's promotion, his Eliteserien debut came in September 2022 against Molde.

Seen as a considerable talent, the first transfer bids on Henrik Melland from foreign clubs came in 2020 when he was 15 years old. He made his international debut in 2021 for Norway U16.

The month after, Melland extended his contract to the end of 2026, he broke his leg during training and missed the 2024 season.

In 2025, Melland and two other AaFK players were considered for the 2025 FIFA U-20 World Cup, but Aalesund manager Kjetil Rekdal refused to allow their participation, citing important league matches. Aalesund, winning promotion to the 2026 Eliteserien, also rejected a transfer bid from Molde, reportedly around 5 million kr. Instead, Melland extended his contract from the end of 2026 to the end of 2028. In the summer of 2026, however, Aalesund were willing to sell Melland. He was bought by Lillestrøm SK as the most expensive purchase in club history, penning a contract until the end of 2030. His team qualified for the 2026–27 UEFA Europa League league phase.
