= 1997 Tippeligaen =

53rd season of top-tier football league in Norway

Tippeligaen
- Season: 1997
- Dates: 12 April – 19 October
- Champions: Rosenborg; 12th title
- Relegated: Lyn; Skeid
- Champions League: Rosenborg
- UEFA Cup: Brann; Strømsgodset; Molde
- Intertoto Cup: Stabæk; Kongsvinger
- Matches played: 182
- Goals scored: 599 (3.29 per match)
- Top goalscorer: Sigurd Rushfeldt (25 goals)
- Biggest home win: Strømsgodset 8–0 Kongsvinger (10 August 1997)
- Biggest away win: Sogndal 0–7 Rosenborg (3 August 1997)
- Highest scoring: Kongsvinger 4–6 Brann (14 September 1997)
- Highest attendance: 18,702; Rosenborg 5–0 Haugesund (16 May 1997)
- Lowest attendance: 911; Lyn 4–0 Tromsø (19 October 1997)
- Average attendance: 4,738 ▼7.5%

The 1997 Tippeligaen was the 53rd completed season of top division football in Norway. Each team played 26 games with 3 points given for wins and 1 for draws. Number thirteen and fourteen are relegated, number twelve has to play two qualification matches (home and away) against number three in the first division (where number one and two are directly promoted) for the last spot.

== Teams and locations ==
Note: Table lists in alphabetical order.

Team	Ap.	Location	Stadium
Bodø/Glimt	9	Bodø	Aspmyra Stadion
Brann	41	Bergen	Brann Stadion
Haugesund	1	Haugesund	Haugesund Stadion
Kongsvinger	15	Kongsvinger	Gjemselund Stadion
Lillestrøm	34	Lillestrøm	Åråsen Stadion
Lyn	27	Oslo	Ullevaal Stadion
Molde	22	Molde	Molde Stadion
Rosenborg	34	Trondheim	Lerkendal Stadion
Skeid	33	Oslo	
Sogndal	7	Sogndalsfjøra	Fosshaugane
Stabæk	3	Bærum	Nadderud Stadion
Strømsgodset	16	Drammen	Marienlyst Stadion
Tromsø	12	Tromsø	Alfheim Stadion
Viking	48	Stavanger	Stavanger Stadion

== League table ==
Pos	Team	Pld	W	D	L	GF	GA	GD	Pts	Qualification or relegation
1	Rosenborg (C)	26	18	7	1	87	20	+67	61	Qualification for the Champions League second qualifying round
2	Brann	26	15	5	6	59	37	+22	50	Qualification for the UEFA Cup second qualifying round
3	Strømsgodset	26	14	4	8	58	44	+14	46	Qualification for the UEFA Cup second qualifying round
4	Molde	26	13	6	7	47	36	+11	45	Qualification for the UEFA Cup second qualifying round
5	Stabæk	26	13	4	9	33	35	−2	43	Qualification for the Intertoto Cup first round
6	Kongsvinger	26	11	5	10	43	48	−5	38	Qualification for the Intertoto Cup first round
7	Bodø/Glimt	26	10	7	9	39	34	+5	37	
8	Viking	26	8	10	8	42	34	+8	34	
9	Haugesund	26	9	5	12	31	38	−7	32	
10	Lillestrøm	26	9	5	12	34	43	−9	32	
11	Sogndal	26	8	5	13	34	56	−22	29	
12	Tromsø (O)	26	6	10	10	37	44	−7	28	Qualification for the relegation play-offs
13	Lyn (R)	26	4	5	17	28	58	−30	17	Relegation to First Division
14	Skeid (R)	26	3	4	19	27	72	−45	13	Relegation to First Division

Source: fotball.no
Rules for classification: 1) points; 2) goal difference; 3) number of goals scored.
(C) Champions; (O) Play-off winners; (R) Relegated

Vålerenga Fotball qualified for the Cup Winners' Cup as Norwegian Cup winners from a lower division.

== Relegation play-offs ==
Tromsø won the play-offs against Eik-Tønsberg, 6–1 on aggregate.

26 October 1997
14:00 CET (UTC+1)

Tromsø	4–0	Eik-Tønsberg
Lange 6', 42'; Johansen 40'; Christensen 72'	Report

Skarphallen, Tromsø
Attendance: 2,016
Referee: Kjell Alseth

2 November 1997
13:00 CET (UTC+1)

Eik-Tønsberg	1–2	Tromsø
Birkeland 35'	Report	Fermann 52'; Lange 71'

Tønsberg Gressbane, Tønsberg
Attendance: 1,600
Referee: Tom Henning Øvrebø

== Results ==
Home \ Away	BOD	BRA	HAU	KON	LIL	LYN	MOL	ROS	SKD	SOG	STB	STM	TRO	VIK
Bodø/Glimt	—	0–3	1–1	4–0	0–1	1–0	4–0	2–2	4–1	1–0	1–1	2–1	5–1	0–3
Brann	3–1	—	3–2	3–1	1–2	0–0	0–4	1–2	4–2	4–1	5–1	4–1	4–3	1–4
Haugesund	1–1	0–1	—	3–3	1–0	1–0	2–1	2–6	2–1	3–0	0–1	1–1	1–1	1–0
Kongsvinger	0–0	4–6	2–1	—	2–0	1–1	1–3	2–2	3–0	2–1	1–2	4–2	3–1	3–1
Lillestrøm	3–1	2–2	1–2	1–3	—	2–0	1–1	2–1	2–2	1–3	0–2	0–1	1–1	2–0
Lyn	1–2	1–5	3–0	1–2	0–4	—	1–3	0–5	2–0	5–2	0–1	1–3	4–0	4–4
Molde	2–1	0–2	1–0	0–1	1–1	3–0	—	0–4	3–3	2–0	4–1	2–0	2–1	0–0
Rosenborg	1–0	1–1	5–0	3–1	3–0	5–1	2–1	—	5–1	5–0	5–0	6–1	0–0	2–2
Skeid	0–1	1–1	0–3	0–2	5–1	3–0	0–3	0–5	—	1–3	1–3	1–5	0–4	1–2
Sogndal	1–2	1–0	2–1	2–1	2–0	2–1	3–3	0–7	1–2	—	0–3	3–3	2–2	1–1
Stabæk	1–1	0–1	2–1	0–0	4–1	1–1	0–1	0–3	3–0	1–0	—	0–1	2–0	2–1
Strømsgodset	1–1	0–4	1–0	8–0	4–2	6–1	2–0	1–5	4–0	3–1	2–0	—	3–2	0–2
Tromsø	2–1	3–0	1–0	2–1	1–3	2–0	4–4	1–1	2–2	0–1	0–1	1–1	—	1–1
Viking	4–2	0–0	0–2	1–0	0–1	0–0	2–3	1–1	4–0	2–2	5–1	1–3	1–1	—

Source: NIFS (in Norwegian)
Legend: Blue = home team win; Yellow = draw; Red = away team win.

== Season statistics ==
=== Top scorers ===
Rank	Player	Club	Goals
1	(Norway) Sigurd Rushfeldt	Rosenborg	25
2	(Norway) Harald Martin Brattbakk	Rosenborg	23
3	(Norway) Mons Ivar Mjelde	Brann	16
4	(Norway) Jostein Flo	Strømsgodset	15
4	(Norway) Kjetil Løvvik	Brann	15
6	(Norway) Odd Inge Olsen	Molde	13
7	(Norway) Daniel Berg Hestad	Molde	12
7	(Norway) Jahn Ivar "Mini" Jakobsen	Rosenborg	12
7	(Norway) Stig Johansen	Bodø/Glimt	12

=== Attendances ===
Pos	Team	Total	High	Low	Average	Change
1	Rosenborg	147,395	18,702	8,830	11,338	+2.4%
2	Brann	147,221	18,349	8,519	11,325	−1.7%
3	Viking	84,868	10,403	3,830	6,528	−12.3%
4	Strømsgodset	72,420	10,063	3,181	5,571	+50.5%
5	Haugesund	62,750	8,715	3,309	4,827	n/a^{1}
6	Lillestrøm	52,877	7,358	2,291	4,067	−29.4%
7	Molde	51,551	8,100	2,005	3,965	−6.6%
8	Stabæk	44,344	7,890	1,401	3,411	+10.0%
9	Bodø/Glimt	43,249	4,448	1,795	3,327	−16.3%
10	Tromsø	41,583	4,562	2,432	3,199	−9.2%
11	Skeid	32,391	5,037	989	2,492	−18.4%
12	Kongsvinger	31,736	3,813	1,799	2,441	−1.9%
13	Lyn	26,187	5,333	911	2,014	n/a^{1}
14	Sogndal	23,806	4,650	1,238	1,831	n/a^{1}
	League total	862,378	18,702	911	4,738	−7.5%

Source: nifs.no
Notes:
1: Team played last season in 1. divisjon.
