= Tor Åge Larsen =

Norwegian footballer (born 1972)

Personal information
- Date of birth: 29 May 1972 (age 54)
- Height: 1.88 m (6 ft 2 in)
- Positions: Striker; defender (Note: Larsen played a striker earlier in his career, and as a defender later in his career.)

Youth career
- Odda

Senior career*
Years	Team	Apps	(Gls)
–1991	Odda		
1992	Start	3	(1)
1993	Djerv 1919		
1994–2001	Haugesund		
- * Club domestic league appearances and goals

Tor Åge Larsen (born 29 May 1972) is a retired Norwegian footballer. He started his career as a striker, and played as such in the Eliteserien for IK Start, before becoming a right back and playing in the Eliteserien for FK Haugesund. At the time of his retirement in 2001, he held the record of most games played for Haugesund.

== Career ==
Larsen played for his hometown club Odda. As a teenager, he also played handball, among others scoring 19 goals in one match. As a part of the men's football team, Larsen helped secure its place on the fourth tier in 1989, with the local newspaper naming him as "one of the greatest talents to play football in Odda". In late 1990 he went on trial with the first-tier club Start. He chose to play another season for Odda as he wanted to finish secondary school before transferring. In November 1991 he was finally ready to move and signed a one-year contract with Start. He has also trained with Djerv 1919. The transfer fee was set to 95,000 kr by the football association.

Larsen resided in the house of the Mathisen family, the parents of Svein Mathisen, while also doing his compulsory military service at Odderøya. He experienced a good start to his spell at Start. He scored in a preseason friendly against AaB. His league debut for Start came in the 16 May game against Kongsvinger. Being substituted on, he almost immediately scored with a header. In the 1992 cup, Start faced minnows Flekkefjord FK away, but struggled to score until Larsen was substituted on. He scored after two minutes on the field, to ultimately put Start through with 1–0. Larsen was now referred to as a supersub.

At the closure of the 1992 season, it surfaced that Start might want to prioritize differently, reducing their squad size and using more locals as backup players. Larsen entered talks with First Division team Djerv 1919. Following a meagre 3 league games for Start, Larsen signed for Djerv 1919.

Djerv 1919 struggled immensely in the 1993 1. divisjon. Larsen was repurposed as a full-back. After the 1993 season, Djerv 1919 merged its senior team with SK Haugar to form FK Haugesund.

During their first season, FK Haugesund eliminated Vard, the third team from the city which was not a part of the merger, from the 1994 cup. Larsen scored once in the 2–1 victory. The 1996 1. divisjon ended with Larsen winning promotion to Eliteserien with FK Haugesund. Haugesunds Avis named him man of the match twice during this victorious campaign.

Larsen continued playing in the back position in FK Haugesund. He passed the 150-game tally for FK Haugesund in 1997 and was the player on the team with the most games. As an Eliteserien player for Haugesund, Larsen was man of the match once according to VG, in a 1–0 victory over Lillestrøm in October 1997. After Asbjørn Helgeland missed four penalties in the league and cup, Larsen became Haugesund's penalty shooter.

He got three seasons in the highest league, 1997, 1998 and 2000. In 1998, media spread reports that a player agent would fix a trial at Fulham F.C. for Larsen. He did not accept a new contract with FK Haugesund after the 2001 season, which according to him entailed a wage cut, and subsequently retired. Having played 208 matches across all competitions, he was the club's leading player in number of games played. As FK Haugesund reached 25 years in 2018, Haugesunds Avis named Larsen as their 19th most important player in club history.

== Personal life ==
He continued residing in Haugesund, watching FK Haugesund's home games against the larger Norwegian teams. He supports Tottenham Hotspur and took up golf as a hobby.

He married in 2007, but his wife died in 2009. He later remarried in 2015. Having suffered from back problems in the late 2010s and early 2020s, which rendered him disabled, he was diagnosed with bowel cancer in 2023. However, he survived the cancer treatment at Haukeland Hospital.
