= Helgeland (surname) =

Helgeland is a Norwegian surname. Notable people with the surname include:

- Asbjørn Helgeland (born 1966), Norwegian footballer and coach
- Brian Helgeland (born 1961), American screenwriter, film producer and director
- Sjur Helgeland (1858–1924), Norwegian musician and composer
