= Falkum =

- District
- Interactive map of Falkum
- Coordinates: 59°12′29″N 9°33′10″E
- Country: Norway
- Region: Eastern Norway
- County: Skien
- Municipality: Skien

Population (2013)
  - Total: 15,234
- Time zone: UTC+01:00 (CET)
  - Summer (DST): UTC+02:00 (CEST)

Falkum is a neighborhood in Skien, Norway, with 15,234 residents. It is a high-density, youthful neighborhood with a high percentage of families headed by single parents. Falkum is largely a working-class neighbourhood, with a mix of low and high income residents, as well as many immigrants.

== Character ==
Falkum has both a villa district and a residential section. The residential section is in the north, and consists chiefly of 63 apartment buildings. The villa district is in the South, and it is dominated by large houses and large villas. The mix of villa district and residential section can be seen as a part of the social democratic ideology that heavily influenced Norwegian society: People of different classes were to live peacefully on each side of the neighborhood.

In recent times, the northern part of Falkum is known for being a dense and diverse residential neighborhood of Skien. Suburban development began in the late 1950s, and today the area is characterized by a mix of Low-rises and high-rise apartment buildings. The residential section of Falkum was originally designed as a planned community for 5,000 residents, but now houses 10,000. It consists of 3 high-rise buildings. These massive residential towers were built in the 1970s. Today, officially, 10,000 people live in the neighbourhood's 3 apartment towers, 30 low rise buildings and 30 terraced house buildings, making it Telemark's most densely populated community.

The southern parts of Falkum, Søndre Falkum and Bakken, are characterized by villas and large houses in Empire and Swiss-style from the 1840s-50s. This area was formerly known for a strong low-income class environment, especially in the 1980s and throughout the 1990s. Bakken was notorious for its heavy concentration of gangs and gang violence, such as the Bakkerampen, which all originated in the Bakken area. The district was fortunately not destroyed by any the great fires in 1777, 1854 and 1886. Bakken has with its low position often been hit by floods, the neighborhood was thus submerged by the flood in 1927. The neighborhood is prone to flooding from heavy rains, and the most recent flooding event was the flood in 2015. Today, the population is estimated to be about 5000 and has the highest income per capita in the western districts of Skien. It is one of the most expensive area in Skien due to the central location. The beach Bakkestranda is usually crowded during the summer. This is a well-known recreation area all year round, attracting people from the whole of Skien. The local soccer team, Skiens Grane, was founded in 1911 and has strong roots and traditions in this part of Skien.

== Sports ==
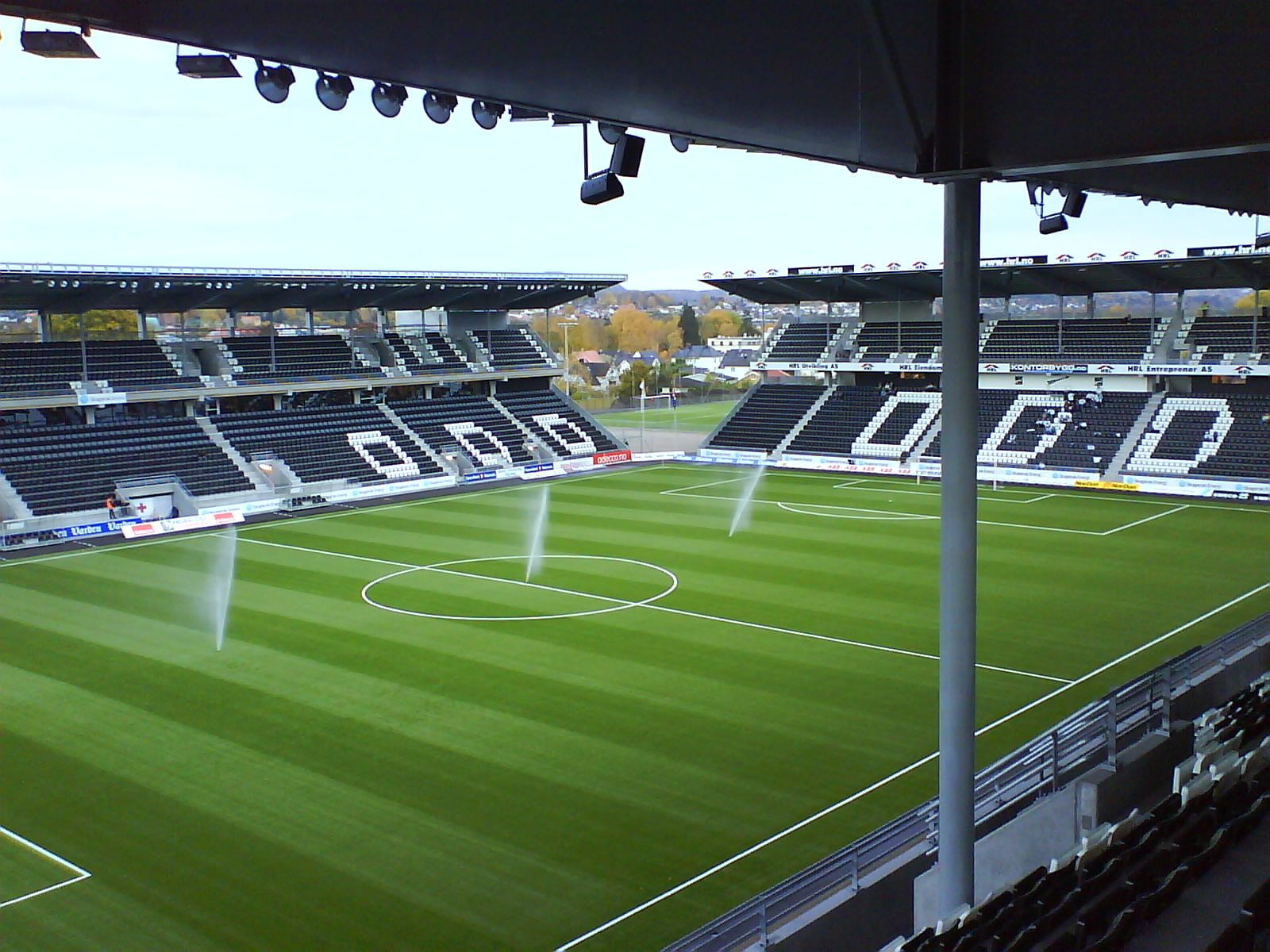
Skagerak Arena viewed from Sparebank 1 tribune

Skagerak Arena (capacity 13,500), the soccer stadium for the local soccer team Odds BK is located at Falkum. It is named Skagerak Arena after local sponsor Skagerak Energi and it was finished in 2008. Odd plays in the Tippeligaen and holds the record winning the Norwegian Football Cup the most times, the last coming in 2000.

== Parkland ==
Next to Skagerak Arena is Stevneplassen, where car shows, flea markets, circuses, fairs, exhibitions, conferences, concerts and festivals are held. Stevneplassen is a 58,000 m² large park located in the district of Falkum (consisting of parkland, an indoor soccer pitch and an indoor skate board park). The most famous and traditional event at Stevneplassen is the Russefeiring, held in may each year.

== Notable residents ==
- Rune Jarstein, professional football player
- Tommy Svindal Larsen, professional football player
- Ronny Deila, professional football player and coach
- Elbasan Rashani, professional football player
