= Frode Fagermo =

Norwegian footballer (born 1973)

Personal information
- Date of birth: 1973 (age 52–53)
- Position: Midfielder

Youth career
- Bossmo & Ytteren

Senior career*
Years	Team	Apps	(Gls)
–1991	Bossmo & Ytteren		
1992–1994	Mo		
1995–2000	Stålkameratene		
2001–2005	Aalesund	104	(6)
2009	Skarbøvik		

Managerial career
- 2006–2007: Aalesund (youth)
- 2010–2012: Aalesund (youth)
- 2013: Spjelkavik (youth)
- 2014–2019: Spjelkavik
- 2021–2024: AaFK Fortuna
- 2025: Jerv (assistant)
- * Club domestic league appearances and goals

Frode Fagermo (born 1973) is a Norwegian footballer who played as a midfielder. He played in the Eliteserien for Aalesunds FK and in the 1. divisjon for Aalesunds FK and IL Stålkameratene.

== Playing career ==
Hailing from Mo i Rana, he played youth and senior football for local club Bossmo & Ytteren IL. He joined Mo/Bossmo in 1992 and made his 2. divisjon debut with that club Mo/Bossmo in 1994. After that season, he moved to IL Stålkameratene in the 1. divisjon.

Stålkameratene were administratively relegated to the 1998 3. divisjon, where Fagermo scored 32 goals. In 1999 and 2000, Fagermo was considered by multiple larger clubs. In late 1999 he went on trial with Bodø/Glimt, but the club pulled out. The next year, interest also came from Sogndal and Lyn. In October he chose the newly promoted 1. divisjon club Aalesunds FK, where he would receive a much higher wage, becoming almost professional.

In 2002 he helped win promotion to the 2003 Eliteserien. However the club were narrowly relegated again. Following re-promotion he got one more season on the highest tier, in the 2005 Eliteserien, After the season, he did not receive a new contract and was contacted by multiple clubs, but retired to pursue a career as coach of Aalesund's U19 team.

== Managerial career ==
Ahead of the 2008 season he declined a job offer from Mo IL. He took a break from coaching to become a bank adviser.

In 2009 he made a comeback as a player, for local Ålesund club Skarbøvik IF. After that season he returned to coaching, this time for a boys' team in Aalesund. Ahead of the 2013 season he moved to the same job in Spjelkavik IL. He took over as head coach in 2014. He resigned at the end of 2019, following good progression on the field.

In March 2021 Fagermo started as acting manager for the women's team of AaFK Fortuna, whose manager was on sickness leave. He got the job on a permanent basis. After several years as manager, the board of directors chose "a new direction" and discontinued the employment of Fagermo in late 2024. His first job outside of Ålesund city was that of assistant manager in FK Jerv. He resigned and moved back to Ålesund after the 2025 season.

== Personal life ==
As a child he also played handball and Nordic combined skiing.

He is married and has three children. In 2013 he was a participant in the reality show Farmen.
