= Ronny Døhli =

Norwegian footballer (born 1978)

Personal information
- Date of birth: 3 March 1978 (age 48)
- Position: Defender

Youth career
- –1994: Strømmen

Senior career*
Years	Team	Apps	(Gls)
1995–1996	Strømmen		
1997–1998	Skjetten		
1999–2004	Vålerenga	81	(0)
2004	→ Sandefjord (loan)	10	(0)
2005	Strømsgodset	20	(0)
- * Club domestic league appearances and goals

Ronny Døhli (born 3 March 1978) is a retired Norwegian football defender.

He went from Strømmen IF's junior team to its senior team in 1995. In 1997 he went on to Skjetten SK, only to get his big break in July 1998 when signed by Vålerenga for the coming season. He got almost 100 league and cup games for Vålerenga and played in the victorious 2002 Norwegian Football Cup Final. He finished his career in Sandefjord and Strømsgodset.
