= Frank Mathiesen =

Norwegian footballer (born 1969)

Personal information
- Date of birth: 13 February 1969 (age 57)
- Position: Goalkeeper

Senior career*
Years	Team	Apps	(Gls)
–1987	Ørskog		
1988–1991	Aalesund		
1992–1994	Vålerenga		
1995–2003	Aalesund		

Managerial career
- Aalesund (goalkeeper coach)
- * Club domestic league appearances and goals

Frank Mathiesen (born 13 February 1969) is a retired Norwegian football defender.

A club legend in Aalesund, he joined them from Ørskog ahead of the 1988 season. The club was a mainstay on the second tier, but Mathiesen got the chance at Vålerenga from 1992 through 1994, the last season on the first tier. He rejoined Aalesund and finally got to represent the club in Eliteserien in 2003, retiring post-season. He became AaFK's goalkeeper coach.
