= Trond Vidar Hansen =

Norwegian footballer (born 1974)

Personal information
- Date of birth: 7 May 1974 (age 52)
- Position: Forward

Youth career
- –1990: Kvaløysletta
- 1992–1993: Tromsø

Senior career*
Years	Team	Apps	(Gls)
1991	Kvaløysletta		
1994–1996	Finnsnes		
1997–1999	Bodø/Glimt	38	(2)
1999	→ Finnsnes (loan)	13	(13)
2000	Finnsnes		
2001–2002	Skarp		
2004–2005	Fløya		
- * Club domestic league appearances and goals

Trond Vidar Hansen (born 7 May 1974) is a retired Norwegian football striker.

== Career ==
He started his career in Kvaløysletta IL and played senior football there in 1991. In 1992, he joined the junior team of the dominant team in the city, Tromsø IL. In 1994 he moved to Finnsnes IL. In the fall of 1994, he broke his left shin in a duel during a match. In February 1995, it broke again, this time during training. He was match-fit in late July 1995, and in his second match, he scored six goals against hapless Ringvassøy as Finnsnes won 11–2.

In the summer of 1996, Hansen decided to relocate to Bodø to study business administration. He had scored 6 league goals in 7 games and 3 cup goals in 2 games, and FK Bodø/Glimt would allow him to come on trial. He continued playing for Finnsnes, and had increased his goalscoring tally to 12 by July 1996. He stayed in Bodø during the week and trained with Bodø/Glimt. Bodø/Glimt signed Hansen on 12 September 1996, effective from New Year's. Manager Trond Sollied praised his ball skills, technique, speed and tactical understanding. For Hansen, the chance to play in Eliteserien was considered a "revenge" after Tromsø IL had declined to sign him three years prior. He made his Eliteserien debut in May 1997 against Kongsvinger.

Hansen did not experience a straightforward path to Bodø/Glimt's first team. By June 1997, two months into the 1997 Eliteserien, Hansen had played only 30 minutes combined. As Bodø/Glimt used the 4–3–3 formation, Hansen was not able to upend Stig Johansen as the first-choice striker. At the same time, Bodø/Glimt refused to loan out Hansen and Håvard Sakariassen to struggling First Division side Harstad IL. Hansen ended goalless in 1997. During the 1998 pre-season, the local press saw signs that Hansen was closer to the first team. Among others, he scored 4 goals in a friendly against local minnows FK Gevir Bodø. In July 1998, he finally scored his first goal for Bodø/Glimt. Being substituted in, he converted a pass from Arild Berg, which was the decisive goal in the 1–2 away victory over Sogndal. In the next match, Hansen scored again. As Bodø/Glimt thrashed Strømsgodset 6–2, Hansen and Bengt Sæternes was described as "Glimt's new super duo". Commented Nordlands Framtid, "He was a constant worry for the Strømsgodset central defenders, and nearly ridiculed them in every duel".

Finnsnes IL wanted to sign Hansen after the 1998 season. At the same time, Hansen wanted to try winning a place in the team under Bodø/Glimt's new manager. Hansen started 1999 playing mainly for their B team. Though he scored 4 goals in a single match in May, and was allowed to represent Bodø/Glimt in the cup where he scored again (both in the first and second round), neither he nor the club were interested in drafting a new contract.

In June 1999 he was loaned out to Finnsnes. By September, Hansen had scored once in every match on average, and also recorded assists. Bryne FK stated their intention to have Hansen on trial. Alta IF and Sarpsborg FK also wanted the player. As the 1999 season concluded, Hansen was credited for saving Finnsnes from relegation. The team managed to collect 24 of 27 possible points after he was loaned in, and he attracted attention from clubs in Eastern Norway. In February 2000, he travelled to Østfold and had talks with Sarpsborg FK, Kvik Halden FK and Fredrikstad FK–as well as Ull/Kisa in Akershus. In March, however, the news broke that Finnsnes managed to secure Hansen on a two-year contract.

In December 2000, it was clear that Hansen was not able to play for Finnsnes in 2001, due to the taxing commute, and he agreed to join IF Skarp. Finnsnes chose to set a low asking price for the player. He did not score on his Skarp debut, incidentally a friendly match against Finnsnes, but he scored when his current team eliminated his former team from the qualifying round of the 2001 cup. Skarp had also strengthened their team with forwards Bård Karlsen and Hans Åge Yndestad. Skarp became one of the highest-scoring teams in the 2001 2. divisjon, and by September they were the highest-scoring team, with Hansen reaching double digits. He was greatly surpassed by Bård Karlsen, though, who scored 35 goals (erasing Ole Martin Årst's record in the division).

In 2004 he made a football comeback for IF Fløya, and also featured for the Norway national beach soccer team.

== Personal life ==
In 2000 he had a son with his cohabitant Mette Eidissen. She was also a footballer. Playing for IK Grand Bodø, she helped win the playoff to the 1999 Toppserien. After the 1999 season, she announced her retirement.

After finishing his financial education in Bodø, Hansen worked as a stockbroker for SpareBank 1 Nord-Norge. He was a Liverpool supporter.
