= Bjørn Viljugrein =

Norwegian footballer (born 1969)

Personal information
- Date of birth: 24 November 1969 (age 56)
- Position: Midfielder

Youth career
- –1987: Strømmen

Senior career*
Years	Team	Apps	(Gls)
1988–1991	Strømmen	56	
1992	Vålerenga		
1993–1994	Lørenskog		
1995–1996	Stabæk	50	(7)
1997–2001	Vålerenga	107	(18)
2002	Hønefoss	27	(6)

International career
1997	Norway	1	(0)
- * Club domestic league appearances and goals

Bjørn Viljugrein (born 24 November 1969) is a retired Norwegian football midfielder. He represented the Norway national team on one occasion in 1997.

He started his career in Strømmen IF and was drafted into the senior team in 1988. In 1992 he moved on to the larger club Vålerenga, only lasting one year and moving on to Lørenskog IF.

However, in 1995 he finally made his break onto the first tier when joining newly promoted Stabæk. From 1997 to 2001 he enjoyed a steady second spell with Vålerenga, though missing the 1999 season through a serious knee injury. He won the 1997 Norwegian Football Cup Final. In 2002 he rounded off with a season in Hønefoss BK.
