= Nesodden IF =

Norwegian sports club

- Full name: Nesodden Idrettsforening
- Founded: 24 July 1920
- Ground: Berger stadion
- League: Third Division
- 2013: Second Division/ 1, 14th (relegated)
Home colours

Nesodden Idrettsforening is a Norwegian sports club from Nesodden. It has sections for association football, athletics, basketball, table tennis, fencing, orienteering, skiing and speed skating.

Founded on 24 July 1920, their home field is Berger stadion. The club colors are black and white. The handball section broke away in 1992 to form Nesodden HK.

The men's football team is playing in the Fifth division for the 2023-season. The club played in the Second Division between 2011 and 2013. Their best known player is Jonas Krogstad.

== Recent history ==
Season		Pos.	Pl.	W	D	L	GS	GA	P	Cup	Notes
2009	3. divisjon	2	22	14	4	4	63	35	46	Second qualifying round	
2010	3. divisjon	↑ 1	20	16	1	3	79	25	49	First qualifying round	Promoted to the 2. divisjon
2011	2. divisjon	6	26	13	2	11	53	44	41	Second round	
2012	2. divisjon	7	26	9	7	10	40	47	34	First round	
2013	2. divisjon	↓ 14	26	4	4	18	23	73	16	First round	Relegated
