= Ahyee Aye Elvis =

Ivorian footballer

Ahyee Aye
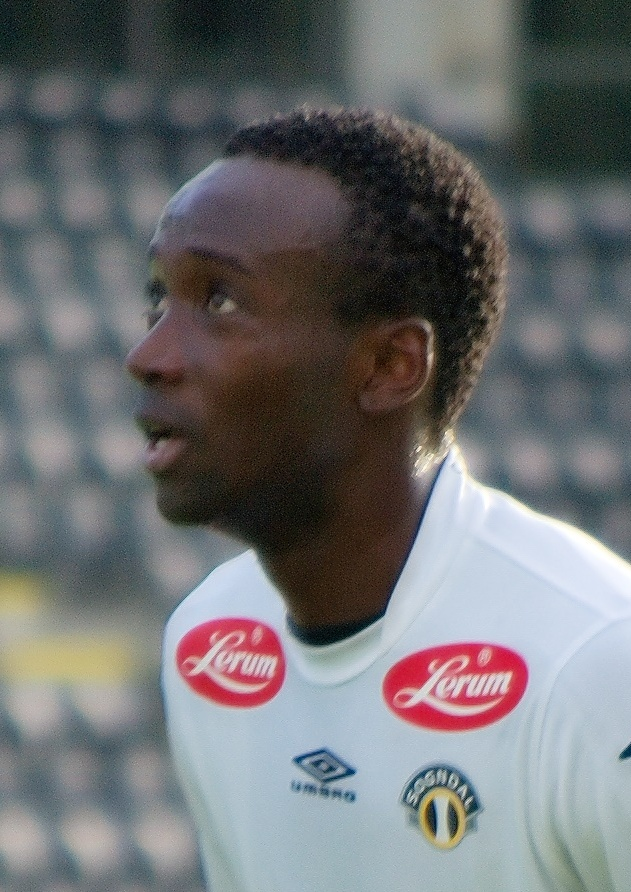

Personal information
- Full name: Ahyee Aye Elvis
- Date of birth: 13 December 1983 (age 42)
- Place of birth: Abidjan, Ivory Coast
- Height: 1.78 m (5 ft 10 in)
- Position: Defender

Youth career
- Stella Club

Senior career*
Years	Team	Apps	(Gls)
2002–2003	Stella Club	30	(10)
2004–2012	Sogndal	143	(16)
2013	Vard Haugesund	25	(1)
2014	EGS Gafsa	2	(0)
- * Club domestic league appearances and goals as of 22 July 2015

Ahyee Aye Elvis (born 13 December 1983 in Abidjan) is an Ivorian footballer, whose last known club was EGS Gafsa.

== Career ==
He can play in both defence and midfield, and signed for Sogndal on 31 August 2004, after having played for Stella Club d'Adjamé in his homeland. Aye, known for his acceleration, took over the position from Robbie Russell, who now plays for Viborg FF. In January 2013, he signed with newly promoted Vard Haugesund.

== Career statistics ==
Season	Club	Division	League		Cup		Total	
Season	Club	Division	Apps	Goals	Apps	Goals	Apps	Goals
2004	Sogndal	Tippeligaen	6	1	0	0	6	1
2005	Sogndal	Adeccoligaen	13	2	0	0	13	2
2006	Sogndal	Adeccoligaen	19	4	1	0	20	4
2007	Sogndal	Adeccoligaen	27	3	0	0	27	3
2008	Sogndal	Adeccoligaen	2	0	0	0	2	0
2009	Sogndal	Adeccoligaen	13	4	1	0	14	4
2010	Sogndal	Adeccoligaen	23	2	6	1	29	3
2011	Sogndal	Tippeligaen	26	0	4	0	30	0
2012	Sogndal	Tippeligaen	14	0	1	0	15	0
2013	Vard Haugesund	Adeccoligaen	25	1	1	0	26	1
Career Total			168	17	14	1	182	18
