= Øyvind Alapnes =

Norwegian football referee

- Born: 16 November 1976 (age 49)

Domestic
- Years: League

International
- Years: League
- 2005: UEFA

Øyvind Alapnes (born 16 November 1976) is a Norwegian football referee. He is a member of Finnsnes IL. Alapnes is an association referee, and officials regularly in the Norwegian Premier League. In July 2005 he received his first international duty on senior level when he was the 4th official in a UEFA Cup game in Georgia between the home team Torpedo Kutaisi and the Belarusian team BATE Borisov.
