= Vebjørn Hagen =

Norwegian footballer (born 1978)

Personal information
- Date of birth: 29 January 1978 (age 48)
- Height: 1.78 m (5 ft 10 in)
- Position: Defender

Youth career
- –1997: Bodø/Glimt

Senior career*
Years	Team	Apps	(Gls)
1998–1999	Bodø/Glimt	11	(0)
1999–2002	→ Skjetten (loan)		
2000–2002	Skjetten/Romerike		
2003–2004	Fredrikstad	28	(2)
2005–2007	Sarpsborg		
2009–2011	Bror av Fredrikstad		
2013	Trosvik		

International career
1993	Norway U15	4	(1)
- * Club domestic league appearances and goals

Vebjørn Hagen (born 29 January 1978) is a retired Norwegian football defender.

He grew up in the club FK Bodø/Glimt, and represented Norway as a youth international. In 1998 he made his Eliteserien debut for the senior team. Playing only cup games in 1999, he was loaned out to Skjetten SK. The move was made permanent to the second-tier club, which also used the moniker Romerike Fotball. In 2003 and 2004 he got two seasons in Fredrikstad FK, helping them win promotion from the 2003 1. divisjon and play in the 2004 Eliteserien. He continued his career in the lower tiers with Sarpsborg FK, Bror av Fredrikstad and Trosvik.
