= Sebastian Henriksson =

Swedish footballer (born 1974)

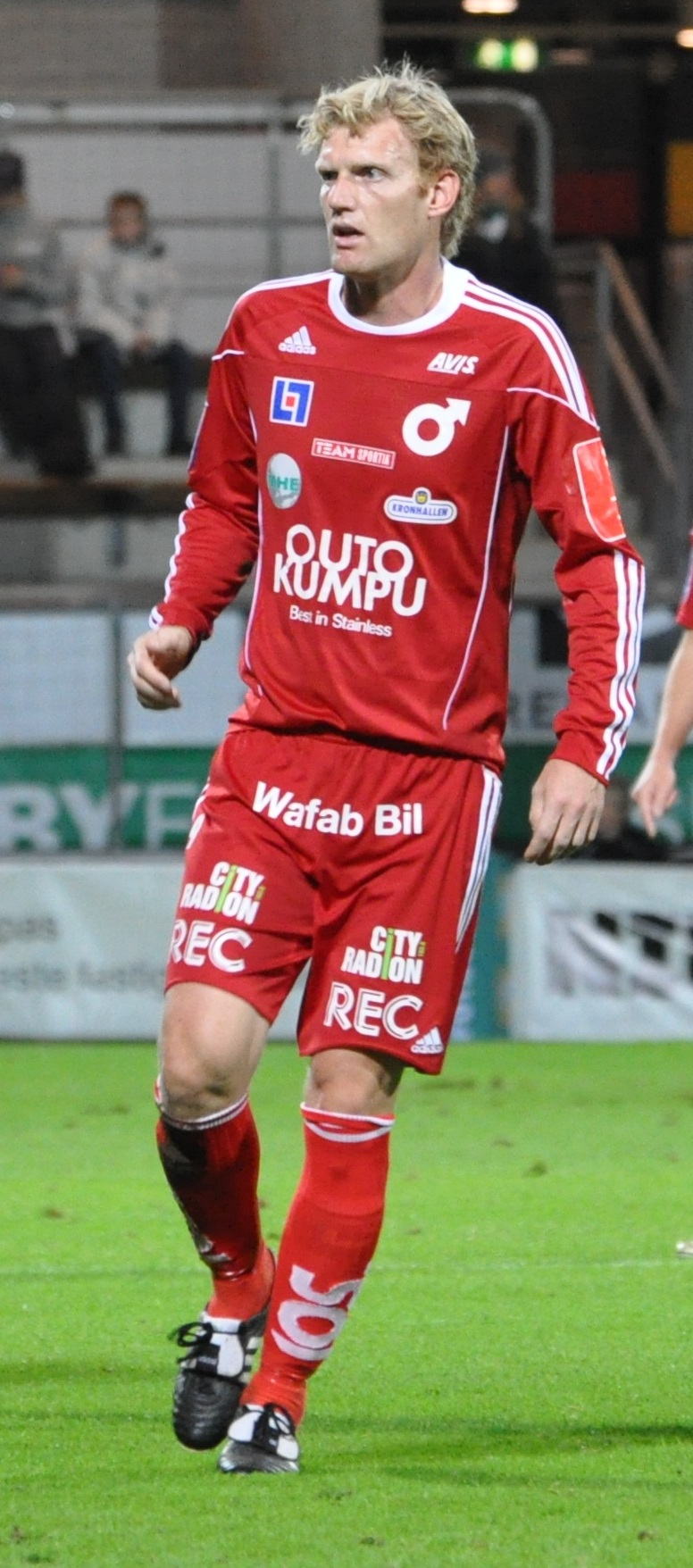

Personal information
- Full name: Sebastian Henriksson
- Date of birth: 12 October 1974 (age 52)
- Place of birth: Degerfors, Sweden
- Height: 1.89 m (6 ft 2 in)
- Position: Forward

Senior career*
Years	Team	Apps	(Gls)
1991–1994	Degerfors IF	67	(2)
1995–1996	Örgryte IS	47	(3)
1997–2002	IFK Göteborg	117	(20)
2003–2005	Odd	59	(9)
2006–2008	Örebro SK	71	(17)
2009–2010	Degerfors IF		

International career^{‡}
1991	Sweden U17	5	(0)
1992	Sweden U19	4	(0)
1994–1995	Sweden U21	14	(0)
1996	Sweden B	1	(0)
1996	Sweden	2	(0)
- * Club domestic league appearances and goals as of 13 February 2010 ‡ National team caps and goals as of 13 February 2010

Sebastian Henriksson (born 12 October 1974) is a Swedish former footballer who played as a forward.

Henriksson played for Degerfors IF, Örgryte IS, IFK Göteborg, Odd and Örebro SK before playing for Degerfors IF a second time.

He has been capped twice for Sweden.

Ahead of the 2000 season, he had an offer to move to Norwegian club Bryne FK as well as Danish clubs.
