= Morten Knutsen =

Norwegian footballer and manager (born 1977)

Personal information
- Date of birth: 27 November 1977 (age 48)
- Place of birth: Arendal, Norway
- Height: 1.80 m (5 ft 11 in)
- Position: Left winger

Youth career
- Grane

Senior career*
| Years | Team | Apps | (Gls) |
- Grane
| 1996–1999 | Start | 61 | (9) |
| 2000–2003 | Rosenborg | 36 | (7) |
| 2002 | → Start (loan) | 19 | (4) |
| 2004–2005 | Odd Grenland | 26 | (3) |
| 2007 | FK Arendal | 0 | (0) |
| 2008 | Trauma | | |
| 2011 | Arendal Fotball | 3 | (0) |

Managerial career
- 2008: Trauma (youth team)
- 2009–?: Trauma
- 2011–?: Arendal
- Grane
- Øyestad
- * Club domestic league appearances and goals

Morten Knutsen (born 27 November 1977) is a Norwegian football coach and former player.

== Career ==
Knutsen started his career in the Arendal-based club IK Grane, and went on to the largest club in the region, IK Start. He made his debut in Tippeligaen in 1996. He then signed for Norway's best team at the time, Rosenborg BK, ahead of the 2000 season. He played 24 games and scored seven goals in his first season, but then only played ten games in 2001. In 2002 he was loaned to Start, where he played 19 games and scored four goals. After a poor 2003 season with only two appearances for Rosenborg, he caught the interest of Odd Grenland in late 2003. He joined the team free of cost, playing 21 out of 26 league games in 2004, and scoring the winning goal in extra time when Odd Grenland beat FK Ekranas in the second qualifying round of the UEFA Cup 2004–05. In 2005, however, he only played five games. His time at Odd was marred by injury problems, and in 2006 he only played for the club's B team.

He retired from football in February 2007, but already in March he signed for FK Arendal on a pay-per-game contract. He stated that although he had given up playing in the Tippeligaen, the 2. divisjon (third tier) might be a suitable arena. However, he almost immediately sustained a serious knee injury, losing the rest of the 2007 season.

In the 2008 season he trained the junior team of IF Trauma, at the same time playing for the men's senior team. He also functioned as caretaker coach for the senior team while the head coach was off sick. In late 2008 he was announced as the new head coach of Trauma, effective from 2009. The team drew IK Start in the 2009 cup.

In 2011, Arendal Fotball assumed play, with Knutsen as player-manager.

Ahead of the 2018 season he took over his childhood club IK Grane, He announced his intention to resign in 2019. He later joined Øyestad IF.

== Personal life ==
Knutsen is married, has children, and resides on Tromøya.

== Honours ==
Rosenborg

- Eliteserien: 2000
