= Jonas Krogstad =

Norwegian footballer (born 1982)

Personal information
- Date of birth: 8 July 1982 (age 44)
- Position: Striker

Team information
- Current team: Nesodden

Senior career*
Years	Team	Apps	(Gls)
–2000	Nesodden		
2001–2004	Vålerenga		
2004	→ Skeid (loan)		
2005–2008	Moss		
2009–present	Nesodden		
- * Club domestic league appearances and goals

Jonas Krogstad (born 8 July 1982) is a Norwegian football striker who currently plays for Nesodden IF.

He started his career in Nesodden IF, and went to Vålerenga Fotball ahead of the 2001 season. In that season he made his senior debut for Vålerenga, and was praised as a talent. Vålerenga was promoted, and Krogstad played nine Norwegian Premier League game in 2002 and thirteen games in 2003.

In 2004 Krogstad was signed by Skeid Fotball on loan as a preemptive replacement of Daniel Braaten. Ahead of the 2005 season he joined Moss FK. He was a regular there for years, but left Moss after the 2008 season due to injury. In the summer of 2009 he rejoined Nesodden, looking to be injury-free soon.
