= Kent Karlsen =

Norwegian footballer and agent (born 1973)

Personal information
- Full name: Kent Ingar Karlsen
- Date of birth: 17 February 1973 (age 53)
- Place of birth: Norway
- Position: Defender

Youth career
- Sørumsand

Senior career*
Years	Team	Apps	(Gls)
1990–1994	Lillestrøm		
1994	→ HamKam (loan)		
1995	HamKam		
1996–2000	Vålerenga		
1998	→ Ikast (loan)		
2000	→ FK Haugesund (loan)		
2000–2001	Luton Town	4	(0)
2002	Åsane		
2003–2004	Tønsberg		
- * Club domestic league appearances and goals as of 27 May 2018

Kent Ingar Karlsen (born 17 February 1973) is a Norwegian retired footballer and football agent.

Hailing from Sørum, Karlsen joined regional giants Lillestrøm to play on the highest tier in Norway. In the latter half of 1998 he was loaned to HamKam, and the move was made permanent for HamKam's 1995 Tippeligaen campaign. Ahead of the 1996 season he joined Vålerenga, winning the 1997 Norwegian Football Cup Final.

In the latter half of 1998 he was loaned to Ikast FS in Denmark, managed by Norwegian Even Pellerud, then to FK Haugesund from March to August 2000. After the 2000 season concluded, Karlsen went to England and Luton Town F.C. He made his debut on 4 November 2000 against Bury, and played his last game on 5 May 2001 against Port Vale. After a period without playing he signed for second-tier club Åsane in Bergen, In 2003 he went on to FK Tønsberg, retiring after the 2004 season and settling in a house in Eik. He started working as a player agent.
