= Tommy Øren =

Norwegian footballer (born 1980)

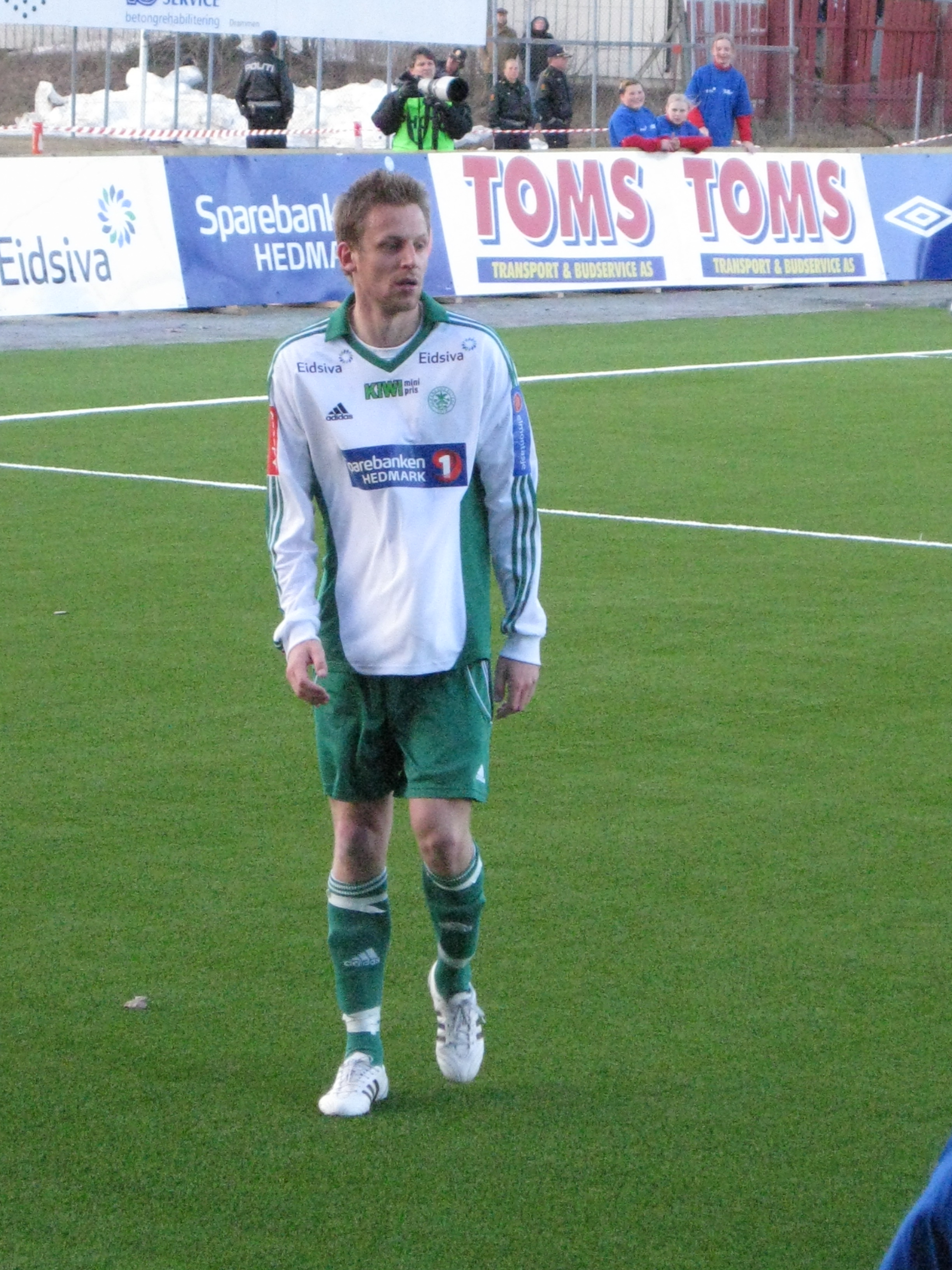

Personal information
- Date of birth: 10 May 1980 (age 46)
- Place of birth: Årdalstangen, Norway
- Height: 1.88 m (6 ft 2 in)
- Position: Striker

Senior career*
Years	Team	Apps	(Gls)
1997–2005	Sogndal	144	(34)
2006–2009	HamKam	85	(14)
2010	Sogndal	14	(3)

International career^{‡}
2001	Norway	1	(0)
- * Club domestic league appearances and goals as of 30 December 2009 ‡ National team caps and goals as of 17 July 2008

Tommy Øren (born 10 May 1980) is a retired Norwegian football striker.

He has played for Sogndal Fotball in his entire senior career, except for the seasons 2006 through 2009 when he played for Hamarkameratene. He has played once for the Norwegian national team.
