= Frode Birkeland =

Norwegian footballer and manager (born 1972)

Personal information
- Date of birth: 25 January 1972 (age 54)
- Position: Forward

Team information
- Current team: Esbjerg (goalkeeper coach)

Youth career
- Minde

Senior career*
Years	Team	Apps	(Gls)
- Minde
- Varegg
1990–1991	Sogndal		
–1993	Vadmyra		
1994–1995	Lyngbø		
1996	Åsane		
1997–1998	Eik-Tønsberg	48	(14)
1999–2002	Lyn	70	(16)
2002	→ Lillestrøm (loan)	12	(5)
2003–2004	HamKam		
2004–2005	Kongsvinger	37	(5)
2006	Hamar		

Managerial career
- 2006: HamKam (B team)
- 2007: Gjøvik-Lyn
- 2008–2009: Lillestrøm (B team)
- 2010–2012: Drøbak-Frogn
- 2013–2016: Hønefoss (goalk. coach/assistant)
- 2017: Levanger (assistant)
- 2018–2021: Start (goalk. coach)
- 2021–: Esbjerg (goalk. coach)
- * Club domestic league appearances and goals

Frode Birkeland (born 25 January 1972) is a retired Norwegian football striker and later manager.

== Career ==
In his early career he played for Bergen-based minnows Minde, Varegg, Vadmyra and Lyngbø, also with a spell in larger club Sogndal in 1990. In 1996 he got a break anew, as he moved from Lyngbø to 1. divisjon club Åsane.

In 1997 he moved on to fellow second-tier club Eik-Tønsberg, then Lyn in 1999. With Lyn he managed promotion to 2001 Eliteserien. In 2001 he also had a trial with Sheffield United, and was allegedly close to a contract, but then Paul Peschisolido and Carl Asaba returned from injury and the transfer fell through. Birkeland instead moved on to Lillestrøm in mid-2002, Hamarkameratene in 2003 and Kongsvinger in mid-2004. He retired from professional football after the 2005 season, but featured for minnows Hamar IL.

He started his coaching career in 2006 for the B team of HamKam, then coached Gjøvik-Lyn in 2007. After one year he was picked up by Lillestrøm and put in charge of their B team. From 2010 through 2012 he was the head coach of Drøbak-Frogn, achieving promotion from 3. divisjon, and from 2013 through 2016 he worked for Hønefoss, both as goalkeeping coach and assistant manager. In 2017 he signed a one-year contract as assistant coach to Magnus Powell in Levanger FK. Seeing the contract through, he moved south to become goalkeeper coach of IK Start in 2018.

On 21 June 2021 it was confirmed, that Birkeland had been hired as a goalkeeper coach for Danish 1st Division club Esbjerg fB.
