= Morten Kihle =

Norwegian footballer (born 1967)

Personal information
- Date of birth: 28 August 1967 (age 59)
- Position: Midfielder

Youth career
- Tønsberg Turn

Senior career*
Years	Team	Apps	(Gls)
–1985	Tønsberg Turn		
1986	Eik-Tønsberg		
1987–1989	Ørn		
1990–1993	Eik-Tønsberg		
1994–1995	Vålerenga	31	(2)
1996–1997	Eik-Tønsberg		
1997–1998	Strømsgodset	22	(1)
1999–2000	Sandefjord		
2000–?	Barkåker		

International career
1984	Norway u-17	1	(0)
1985	Norway u-20	4	(0)
- * Club domestic league appearances and goals

Morten Kihle (born 28 August 1967) is a retired Norwegian football midfielder.

He played youth football for Tønsberg Turn, also representing Norway's youth international teams. Ahead of the 1986 season he went on to Eik-Tønsberg. He also spent time in Ørn, from 1987. He got the chance on the first tier in 1994, with Vålerenga. Featuring in a little more half the league games, he went back to Eik-Tønsberg in 1996, only to be picked up by Strømsgodset in the summer of 1997.

Passing the 30-year mark, he stepped down two tiers to Sandefjord in 1999, securing promotion to the 2000 1. divisjon. He retired after the 2000 season, going on with sixth-tier minnows Barkåker IF.
