= 2003 Tippeligaen =

59th season of top-tier football league in Norway

Tippeligaen
- Season: 2003
- Dates: 12 April – 1 November
- Champions: Rosenborg; 18th title
- Relegated: Aalesund; Bryne
- Champions League: Rosenborg
- UEFA Cup: Bodø/Glimt; Stabæk; Odd Grenland
- Matches: 182
- Goals: 568 (3.12 per match)
- Top goalscorer: Harald Martin Brattbakk (17 goals)
- Biggest home win: Stabæk 6–0 Brann
- Biggest away win: Lillestrøm 0–6 Rosenborg
- Highest scoring: Rosenborg 5–4 Bodø/Glimt
- Longest winning run: 7 games Rosenborg
- Longest unbeaten run: 12 games Rosenborg
- Longest winless run: 10 games Lyn; Tromsø; Aalesund; Bryne
- Longest losing run: 10 games Bryne
- Highest attendance: 21,316; Rosenborg 3–1 Sogndal (16 May 2003)
- Lowest attendance: 1,477; Lyn 2–0 Bryne (21 September 2003)
- Average attendance: 6,588 ▲6.2%

The 2003 Tippeligaen was the 59th completed season of top division football in Norway.

Each team played 26 games with three points given for wins and one point for a draw. Number thirteen and fourteen were relegated, number twelve had to play two qualification matches (home and away) against number three in the 1. divisjon (where number one and two were directly promoted) for the last spot.

== Overview ==
=== Summary ===
Rosenborg won their twelfth consecutive title and eighteenth top-flight title overall. They won with a margin of 14 points down to runners-up Bodø/Glimt and secured the title with five games to spare. Aalesund and Bryne were relegated to 1. divisjon.

== Teams and locations ==
Locations of the teams in 2003 Tippeligaen

Note: Table lists in alphabetical order.

Team	Ap.	Location	Stadium
Aalesund	4	Ålesund	Kråmyra Stadion
Bodø/Glimt	15	Bodø	Aspmyra Stadion
Brann	47	Bergen	Brann Stadion
Bryne	17	Bryne	Bryne Stadion
Lillestrøm	40	Lillestrøm	Åråsen Stadion
Lyn	30	Oslo	Ullevaal Stadion
Molde	28	Molde	Molde Stadion
Odd Grenland	23	Skien	Odd Stadion
Rosenborg	40	Trondheim	Lerkendal Stadion
Sogndal	11	Sogndal	Fosshaugane
Stabæk	9	Bærum	Nadderud Stadion
Tromsø	17	Tromsø	Alfheim Stadion
Vålerenga	43	Oslo	Ullevaal Stadion
Viking	54	Stavanger	Stavanger Stadion

== League table ==
Pos	Team	Pld	W	D	L	GF	GA	GD	Pts	Qualification or relegation
1	Rosenborg (C)	26	19	4	3	68	28	+40	61	Qualification for the Champions League second qualifying round
2	Bodø/Glimt	26	14	5	7	45	30	+15	47	Qualification for the UEFA Cup second qualifying round
3	Stabæk	26	11	9	6	51	35	+16	42	Qualification for the UEFA Cup second qualifying round
4	Odd Grenland	26	11	5	10	46	43	+3	38	Qualification for the UEFA Cup second qualifying round
5	Viking	26	9	10	7	46	34	+12	37	
6	Brann	26	10	7	9	45	47	−2	37	
7	Lillestrøm	26	10	7	9	33	35	−2	37	
8	Sogndal	26	9	8	9	43	46	−3	35	
9	Molde	26	9	4	13	32	41	−9	31	
10	Lyn	26	8	6	12	34	45	−11	30	
11	Tromsø	26	8	5	13	30	52	−22	29	
12	Vålerenga (O)	26	6	10	10	30	33	−3	28	Qualification for the relegation play-offs
13	Aalesund (R)	26	7	7	12	30	43	−13	28	Relegation to First Division
14	Bryne (R)	26	7	1	18	35	56	−21	22	Relegation to First Division

Source: fotball.no
Rules for classification: 1) points; 2) goal difference; 3) number of goals scored.
(C) Champions; (O) Play-off winners; (R) Relegated

== Relegation play-offs ==
- Vålerenga won the qualification for the last spot in the 2004 Tippeligaen against Sandefjord with 5–3 on aggregate.
10 November 2003
20:30 CET (UTC+1)

Sandefjord	0–0	Vålerenga
	Report

Tønsberg Gressbane, Tønsberg
Attendance: 5,614
Referee: Rune Pedersen

22 November 2003
16:00 CET (UTC+1)

Vålerenga	5–3	Sandefjord
Rekdal 11'; Piiroja 28'; Hanssen 45', 84'; Krogstad 90'	Report	Bergman 10', 32' (pen.); Thorsen 39'

Vallhall Arena, Oslo
Attendance: 6,419
Referee: Jonny Ditlefsen

== Results ==
Home \ Away	AAL	BOD	BRA	BRY	LIL	LYN	MOL	ODD	ROS	SOG	STB	TRO	VÅL	VIK
Aalesund	—	0–2	3–3	2–0	2–1	2–0	1–1	2–2	0–2	3–0	1–1	2–3	0–2	1–1
Bodø/Glimt	0–2	—	3–0	3–1	0–2	3–2	2–0	1–0	0–3	3–0	3–1	1–2	0–0	1–1
Brann	3–0	0–2	—	3–0	1–3	4–1	3–2	3–0	1–6	6–1	3–3	0–1	3–1	0–3
Bryne	2–0	0–2	1–1	—	3–1	4–0	3–0	3–2	2–4	0–1	0–2	6–1	3–4	1–0
Lillestrøm	1–1	1–0	0–0	4–0	—	2–0	3–0	3–0	0–6	1–1	0–2	3–2	0–0	1–0
Lyn	2–1	1–2	0–0	2–0	0–3	—	0–2	0–2	0–3	3–0	2–3	5–1	1–1	3–3
Molde	2–3	0–2	3–0	3–2	4–0	2–2	—	0–1	0–2	3–1	0–0	2–1	1–0	1–2
Odd Grenland	3–0	2–4	1–3	3–2	5–0	1–1	1–0	—	2–3	3–3	1–1	5–0	3–1	1–1
Rosenborg	1–0	5–4	2–2	4–1	1–1	2–0	5–0	3–1	—	3–1	1–6	0–1	1–0	4–1
Sogndal	1–1	2–1	2–0	4–0	2–1	1–2	2–3	5–0	1–1	—	2–1	3–1	0–0	2–2
Stabæk	3–1	0–0	6–0	2–1	1–0	1–3	1–1	4–1	2–2	2–3	—	2–2	1–0	0–2
Tromsø	0–1	3–3	0–1	2–0	2–0	0–1	1–0	0–2	2–1	1–1	1–3	—	1–1	2–2
Vålerenga	3–1	1–1	0–2	3–0	1–1	0–1	2–0	0–3	0–1	3–3	2–2	3–0	—	2–2
Viking	4–0	1–2	3–3	3–0	1–1	2–2	1–2	0–1	0–2	2–1	3–1	4–0	2–0	—

Source: NIFS (in Norwegian)
Legend: Blue = home team win; Yellow = draw; Red = away team win.

== Season statistics ==
=== Top scorers ===
Rank	Player	Club	Goals
1	(Norway) Harald Martin Brattbakk	Rosenborg	17
2	(Norway) Frode Johnsen	Rosenborg	16
3	(Norway) Håvard Flo	Sogndal	13
4	(Norway) Magne Hoseth	Molde	11
4	(Norway) Erik Nevland	Viking	11
6	(Netherlands) Edwin van Ankeren	Odd Grenland	10
6	(Norway) Thomas Finstad	Stabæk	10
6	(Norway) Freddy dos Santos	Vålerenga	10
9	(Norway) Kim-Rune Hellesund	Bryne	9
9	(Nigeria) Seyi Olofinjana	Brann	9
9	(Norway) Arild Sundgot	Lillestrøm	9

=== Attendances ===
Pos	Team	Total	High	Low	Average	Change
1	Rosenborg	205,728	21,316	12,009	15,825	+8.2%
2	Brann	158,562	18,642	7,806	12,197	+10.8%
3	Vålerenga	121,364	18,241	5,228	9,336	+6.6%
4	Viking	87,250	11,730	5,250	6,712	−10.6%
5	Aalesund	86,180	9,667	4,088	6,629	n/a^{1}
6	Lillestrøm	77,471	10,412	4,030	5,959	−16.0%
7	Molde	77,280	11,167	3,822	5,945	−4.0%
8	Bodø/Glimt	68,366	7,318	4,027	5,259	+49.7%
9	Odd Grenland	63,726	7,424	3,283	4,902	−10.1%
10	Tromsø	56,875	7,003	2,809	4,375	n/a^{1}
11	Stabæk	56,347	6,409	3,174	4,334	+15.6%
12	Lyn	51,266	14,156	1,477	3,944	−30.6%
13	Bryne	49,267	10,090	2,407	3,790	+13.1%
14	Sogndal	39,360	5,487	2,203	3,028	+21.0%
	League total	1,199,042	21,316	1,477	6,588	+6.2%

Source: nifs.no
Notes:
1: Team played last season in 1. divisjon.
