= Espen Haug =

Norwegian footballer and coach (born 1970)

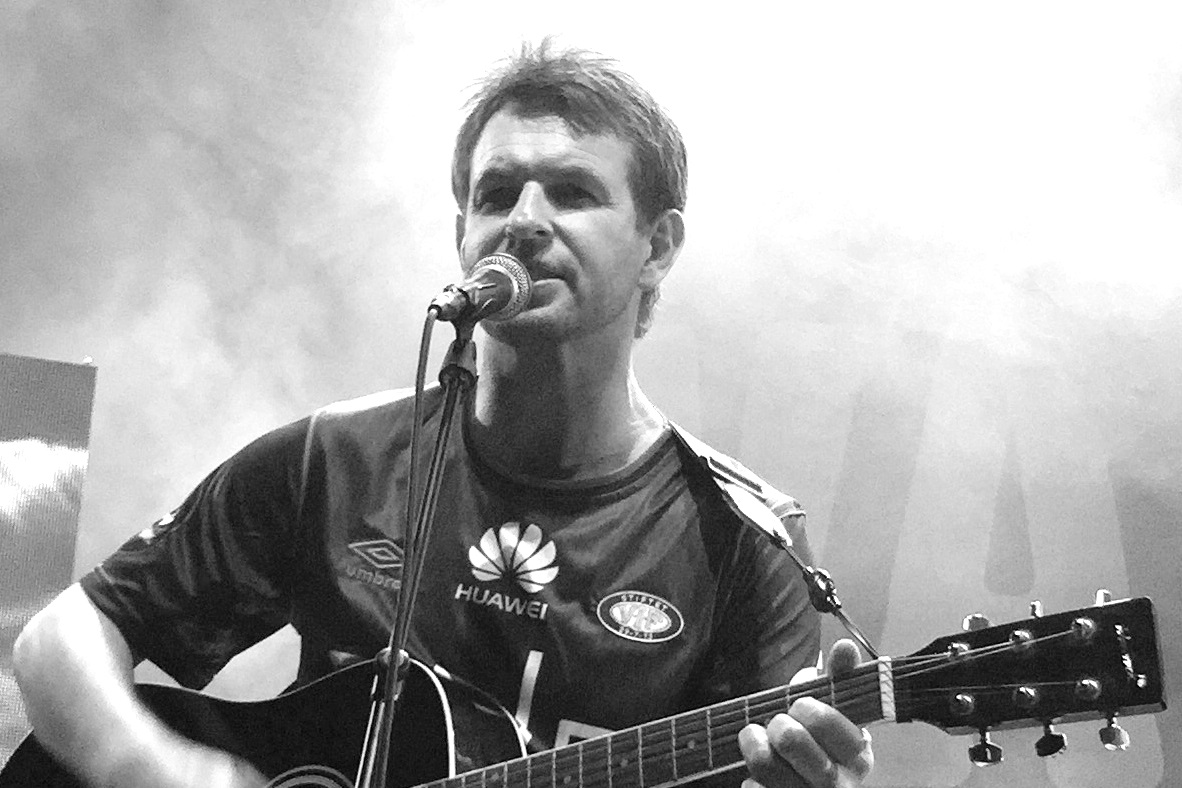
- Haug in 2017

Personal information
- Full name: Espen Haug
- Date of birth: 30 January 1970 (age 56)
- Place of birth: Oslo, Norway
- Height: 1.81 m (5 ft 11 1/2 in)
- Position: Midfielder

Senior career*
Years	Team	Apps	(Gls)
1987–1992	Strømmen	82	(29)
1993–1999	Vålerenga	173	(65)
1999–2001	Lyn	68	(26)
2002–2006	Ham-Kam	126	(27)
2006–2007	Hønefoss	33	(7)
2008	Drøbak/Frogn	9	(2)
2009	Strømmen	2	(0)

International career
1986	Norway U16	3	(0)
1988	Norway U18	1	(0)

Managerial career
- 2006–2007: Hønefoss (assistant)
- 2007–2009: Drøbak/Frogn
- 2010: Strømmen (youth)
- 2012–2016: Raufoss
- 2018–2023: Gjøvik-Lyn
- 2024: KÍ Klaksvik (assistant)
- 2024: KÍ Klaksvik
- * Club domestic league appearances and goals

Espen Haug (born 30 January, 1970) is a Norwegian football coach. In his active career he played for Strømmen, Vålerenga, Lyn, Ham-Kam and Hønefoss.

== Playing career ==
He won the Norwegian Football Cup with Vålerenga in 1997, and scored one of the goals when Strømsgodset were beaten 4-2.

He came to Ham-Kam from Lyn in front of the 2002 season and made his debut against Ørn-Horten 14 April 2002. When Ham-Kam were promoted in 2003, it became the third club Espen Haug earned promotion to Tippeligaen with.

== Managerial career ==
In the middle of the 2006 season, he went to Hønefoss. Espen Haug was appointed coach in Drøbak/Frogn after the coach and athletic director Håvard Lunde resigned as head coach for the club in 2007 season. In the 2009 season had a tough start, and Drøbak/Frogn was positioned at the bottom half of the Second Division table. Drøbak/Frogn's fans were not happy with the development of the team and asked the board for reaction. The chairman, Arild Dregelid, went out in the media and said Espen Haug had the boards confidence, and that he would continue as head coach. But when the poor results continued, Espen Haug was exempt from his duties as head coach for the team.

From October 2017 until he resigned in November 2023, Haug was the manager of SK Gjøvik-Lyn. Before that he managed Raufoss IL.

== Honours ==
- Norwegian Football Cup: 1997
