= Roar Christensen =

Norwegian footballer (born 1971)

Personal information
- Date of birth: 29 April 1971 (age 55)
- Height: 1.76 m (5 ft 9 1/2 in)
- Position: Midfielder

Team information
- Current team: Grovfjord (playing coach)

Senior career*
Years	Team	Apps	(Gls)
–1995	Grovfjord		
1996–2006	Tromsø	235	(14)
2007–present	Grovfjord		

Managerial career
- 2008: Grovfjord (playing assistant coach)
- 2009–present: Grovfjord (playing coach)
- * Club domestic league appearances and goals as of 5 April 2009

Roar Christensen (born 29 April 1971) is a Norwegian football midfielder who currently is the playing head coach of Grovfjord IL.

He started his career in Grovfjord IL, and joined regional greats Tromsø IL ahead of the 1996 season. He made his debut in May 2006 and played his last game in November 2006, amassing 235 league games, most of them in the Norwegian Premier League.

In the 2008 season, Christensen was an assisting coach in Grovfjord IL. Ahead of the 2009 season he was promoted to head coach, doubling as an active player.
