= Bjørn Erik Melland =

Norwegian footballer (born 1974)

Personal information
- Date of birth: 29 September 1974 (age 52)
- Height: 1.80 m (5 ft 11 in)
- Position: Defender

Youth career
- Sprova IL

Senior career*
| Years | Team | Apps | (Gls) |
| 1990-1992 | Sprova IL | | |
| 1993-1997 | Steinkjer | | |
| 1998–2000 | Byåsen | | |
| 2001–2006 | Aalesund | | |
| 2007 | Skarbøvik | | |

Managerial career
- Aalesund (physio)
- 2017–: Aalesund (director of sports)
- * Club domestic league appearances and goals as of 8 June 2015

Bjørn Erik Melland (born 29 September 1974) is a Norwegian retired football defender who notably played in Tippeligaen for Aalesund.

He started his career in Sprova IL, and also played for Steinkjer before debuting in the Norwegian First Division, the second tier, with Byåsen. He went on to study physiotherapy in Ålesund and play for division colleagues Aalesund in 2001. In 2003 and 2005, he featured for Aalesund on the first tier, Tippeligaen. He was let go after the 2006 season, but after one season in Skarbøvik he was later hired as the Aalesund physio. Ahead of the 2017 season he was hired as Aalesund FK's director of sports.

Melland also recorded a 24th place and a 32nd place in the two races of the Norwegian Nordic combined championships of 1992.
