= Tore Krogstad =

Norwegian footballer (born 1967)

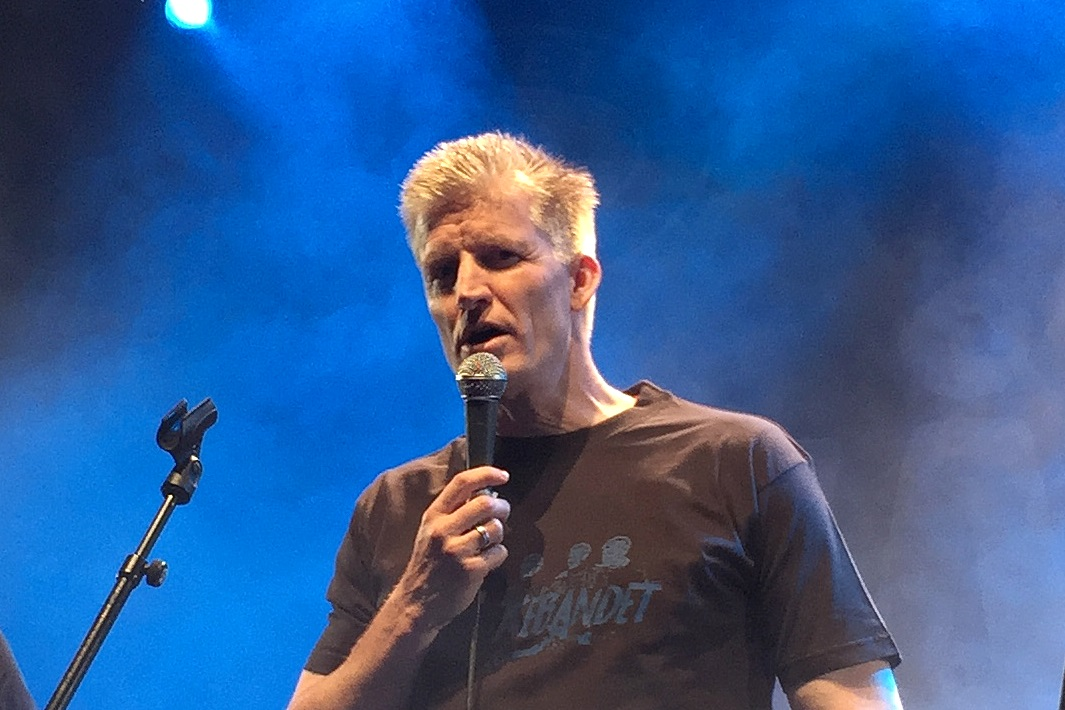

Personal information
- Date of birth: 30 March 1967 (age 59)
- Height: 1.96 m (6 ft 5 in)
- Position: Goalkeeper

Youth career
- 1975–1983: Kongsvinger

Senior career*
Years	Team	Apps	(Gls)
1984–1987	Kongsvinger	16	(0)
1988	Strømmen		
1989–1991	Kongsvinger	55	(0)
1992–1993	Strømmen		
1993	Lillestrøm		
1994–1999	Vålerenga		
- * Club domestic league appearances and goals

Tore Krogstad (born 30 March 1967) is a retired Norwegian football goalkeeper.

He was born in Kongsvinger, and started his career in Kongsvinger IL. He was drafted into the senior team in 1984, as the youngest player in the highest Norwegian league at the time. He played for Kongsvinger until 1991, except for the 1988 season in Strømmen IF. In 1991, he decided to attend the Norwegian Police University College in Oslo. He rejoined Strømmen, and also played half a season for Lillestrøm SK before joining Vålerenga Fotball ahead of the 1994 season. He retired after the 1999 season. He has later worked for the Football Association of Norway.
