= Bjørn Arild Levernes =

Norwegian footballer (born 1972)

Personal information
- Date of birth: 27 April 1972 (age 54)
- Position: Midfielder

Youth career
- Kurland

Senior career*
Years	Team	Apps	(Gls)
–1992	Strømmen		
1993–1994	Kongsvinger	43	(10)
1995–2003	Vålerenga	198	(20)

International career
1990	Norway U19	1	(0)
1992–1993	Norway U21	8	(1)
1995	Norway	2	(1)
- * Club domestic league appearances and goals

Bjørn Arild Levernes (born 27 April 1972) is a Norwegian retired football midfielder.

He started his youth career in Kurland FK and his senior career in Strømmen IF. He then played first tier football for ten consecutive seasons, in 1993–94 for Kongsvinger and 1995–2002 for Vålerenga. He was also a squad member in 2003, but did not play a single match following serious injury. His greatest successes in Vålerenga were victories in the 1997 and 2002 Norwegian Football Cup final, and following the first victory, Vålerenga's run in the 1998–99 UEFA Cup Winners' Cup. Levernes became match winner of both the 2002 Norwegian Football Cup final and the home leg against Beşiktaş in the Cup Winners' Cup.

Levernes was also capped for Norway on youth level, as well as senior level on a 1995 tour of the Caribbean.
