= Anders Rambekk =

Norwegian footballer and politician (born 1976)

Personal information
- Date of birth: 17 August 1976 (age 50)
- Place of birth: Kristiansand, Norway
- Height: 1.90 m (6 ft 3 in)
- Position: Defender

Youth career
- Urædd

Senior career*
Years	Team	Apps	(Gls)
1998	Skeid	?	(?)
1999–2004	Odd Grenland	138	(4)
2005–2007	Lillestrøm	74	(1)
2008–2010	Odd Grenland	87	(4)
2011	Urædd		
Total		299	(9)

International career
2006–2007	Norway	7	(0)
- * Club domestic league appearances and goals

Anders Rambekk (born 17 August 1976) is a retired Norwegian footballer and politician for the Christian Democratic Party.

== Club career ==
He played for Lillestrøm between the beginning of the 2005 season and the end of the 2007 season, when he was transferred back to Odd Grenland. Since his debut in the Norwegian Premier League in 1999 he has played about 291 matches and scored 8 goals. His former clubs are Pors Grenland, Urædd, Lillestrøm and Odd Grenland. Before the 2008 season he went back to Odd Grenland, where he currently is vice captain. Odd tried to bring him before the 2007 season, but the transition stranded when Lillestrøm manager Jan Åge Fjørtoft required a first-team player from Odd in addition to the transition Strømsgodset sum had already been approved. Since, however, he was without a contract after the season, he signed for Odd the same summer. In his last home game against Start he scored the winner in a 2–1 victory. He retired as a professional footballer after the 2010 season.

== International career ==
Rambekk played seven games for the Norway national team.

== Honours ==
=== Club ===
Odd Grenland

- Norwegian Football Cup Win: 2000

Lillestrøm

- Norwegian Football Cup Win: 2007

== Post-retirement ==
He was on 1 September 2014, engaged by Sandnes Ulf as their new assistant coach for the remainder of the year.

In 2015 Rambekk entered politics as an elected member of Porsgrunn municipal council. In the 2017 Norwegian parliamentary election he was elected as fourth deputy to the Parliament of Norway from Telemark. In the 2019 Norwegian local elections he was fielded as mayoral candidate in Porsgrunn.
