= Joachim Walltin =

Norwegian footballer (born 1974)

Joachim Walltin (born 25 June 1974) was a Norwegian football player.

Walltin was midfielder before he retired. He played for Markaryd, Strindheim, Vålerenga and Brann before he joined Tromsø in 2005. He retired from professional football in 2007.

After his retirement, he worked for PwC. Later, he spent ten years at a football player union in Norway called NISO.

Since 2020, he has been working as General Secretary at FIFPRO.

He has also been a board member of EU Athletes since 2021.
