= Skjetten SK =

Norwegian football club

- Full name: Skjetten Sportsklubb
- Founded: 3 May 1967 (merger 16 February 1987)
- Ground: Skjetten stadion, Skjetten
- League: Third Division
- 2024: 4th

Skjetten Sportsklubb is a Norwegian multi-sports club from Skjetten, Lillestrøm Municipality. The alliance sports club has sections for association football, team handball, basketball, volleyball, fencing and swimming, which are separate legal entities.

== Early history ==
Skjetten IL was founded in 1967, which the club counts as its founding date. On 16 February 1987, Skjetten IL merged with Valstad IF (founded 1 November 1976) to form Skjetten SK. The team colours are green and black.

== Men's football ==
The men's football team plays in the Third Division, the fourth tier of Norwegian football. In the 1990s, Skjetten had a good Second Division team, starting with the promotion from the 1994 Third Division under captain Peter Werni. Skjetten won their Second Division group in 1998 and faced Ørn-Horten in the play-offs to the Norwegian First Division. The seemingly comfortable 3–0 lead from the first leg was replaced by a 0–3 deficit and two red cards in the second leg, but Skjetten scored the 1–3 goal in extra time to beat Ørn-Horten 5–4 on aggregate. Skjetten would lose Ronny Døhli and the loanees John Anders Skoglund and Jon Knudsen.

Contesting the 1999 Norwegian First Division, Skjetten were relegated by a one-point margin. The team started well, sitting in fourth place after 15 of 26 games, 5 points below promotion. They then hit a bad streak in August, finding themselves one point above relegation in September. Ahead of the last match, only one team would survive of Skjetten, Lofoten and Byåsen; Skjetten faced Byåsen away. As Byåsen took the lead after 10 minutes, Skjetten were below the relegation line, but equalized to put Lofoten in the safe zone. After 75 minutes, Skjetten hit the goalpost, and then Byåsen scored in the 89th minute to win and survive.

Skjetten's key players were goalkeeper Svein Inge Haagenrud, defenders Olav Zanetti, Gudbrand Ensrud, Vebjørn Hagen and Lars Blixt, midfielders Petter Myhre and John Anders Bjørkøy, and strikers Jørn Holmen and Kenneth Nysæther. The team was coached by Ivar Selnæs and Geir Bakke. Skjetten bounced back to again win their Second Division group in 2000 and faced Aalesund in the play-offs. Aalesund's 1–0 win in the first leg was indecisive, but with 1–1 in the second leg, Aalesund won 2–1 on aggregate.

The 2001 and 2002 Norwegian Second Division were contested under the name Romerike Fotball.

Following a spell in the Third Division from 2005, Skjetten won their group in 2007, entered the play-offs to the Norwegian Second Division and thrashed Grüner IL 14–0 on aggregate. Their Second Division spell lasted for two seasons, until relegation happened in 2009. Another relegation in 2013 was followed by re-promotion. Skjetten was then relegated from the Third Division in 2019, winning re-promotion in 2021 and becoming a Third Division team again.

== Other sections ==
The women's football team plays in the Fourth Division, the fifth tier.

The men's futsal team won promotion to the highest futsal league in 2026.

The club's greatest individual sportsperson is regarded as swimmer Henrik Christiansen.
