= Skagerak Arena =

Football stadium in Skien, Norway

Coordinates: 59°12′40″N 009°35′23″E

- Falkum
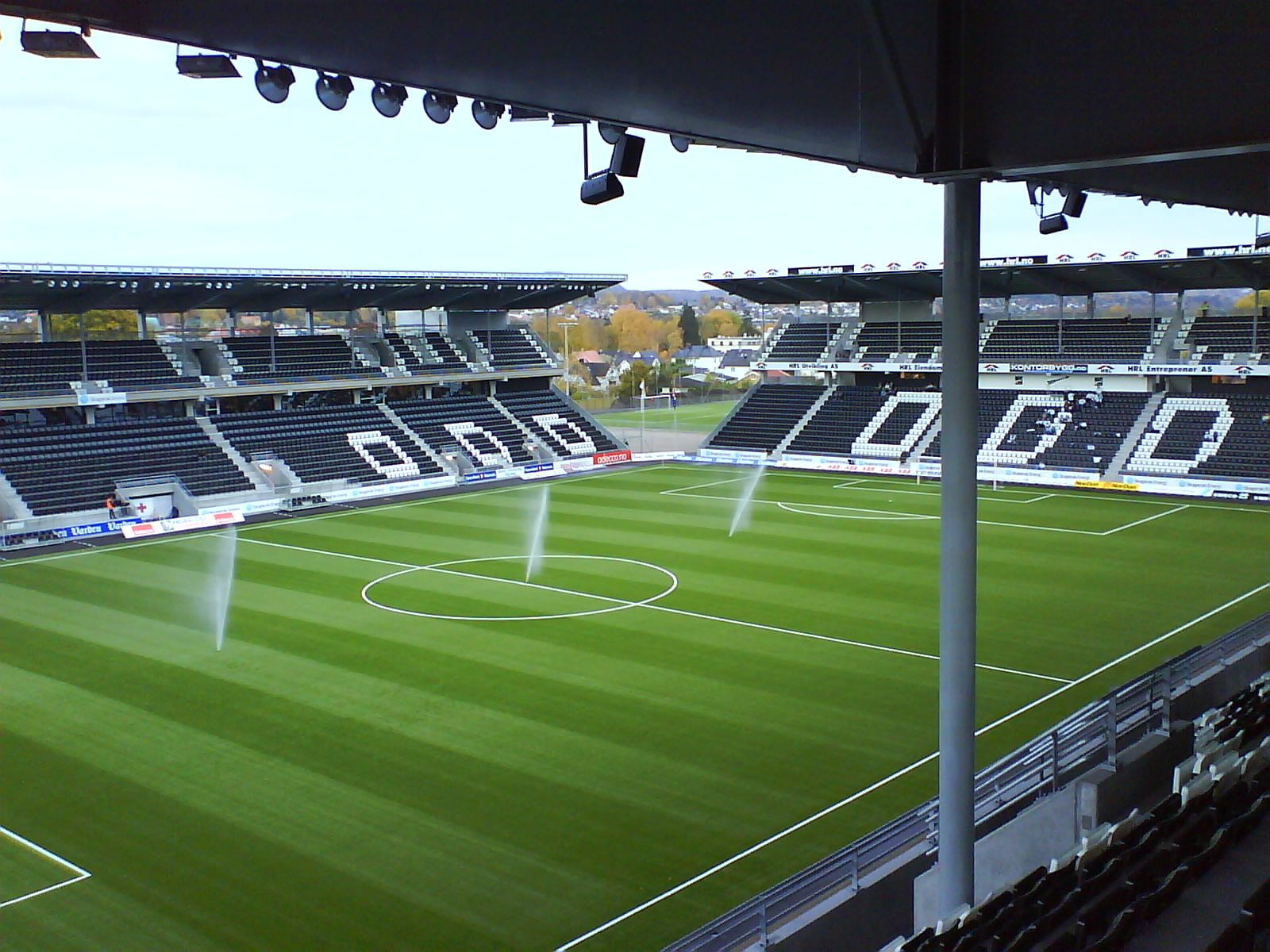
- UEFA
- Interactive map of Skagerak Arena
- Former names: Odd Stadion
- Location: Skien, Norway
- Owner: Odd
- Operator: Odd
- Capacity: 11,767
- Surface: Artificial turf

Construction
- Opened: 17 May 1923
- Expanded: 2006–08

Tenant
- Odd

The Skagerak Arena is a football stadium located in Skien, Norway. It was formerly called Odd Stadion, and was built in 1923 as the home ground of Eliteserien club Odd. The stadium is often referred to as Falkum, being situated in that area of Skien.

The stadium has been undergoing an extensive redevelopment process, begun in November 2006, which produced a modern all-seater venue by April 2008. Part of the finance Odd needed for the project was obtained through the lease of the stadium's naming rights to the club's main sponsor since 1995, the Norwegian power company Skagerak Energi. The stadium will therefore be known as Skagerak Arena until at least 2017.

The pitch has been rotated 90 degrees in order to free up space. As is increasingly common in Norway, the new surface is artificial. The old main stand is now an end stand, incorporated into the new structure as the only surviving feature of the old stadium.

Three new two-tiered stands was completed between 2007 and 2008. The east and west stands has a capacity of 4,300 while the south end seats around 3,000. Construction of the west stand had progressed far enough by April 2007 to allow spectators on the lower tier for the first home match of the season, on 15 April. Total capacity was at first 6,000 and increased gradually throughout 2007. The old stadium had a capacity of about 8,600, of which 5,600 were seated.

The venue has hosted Norway national under-21 football team matches three times, playing 0–0 against Portugal on 9 May 1979, 2–1 against Romania on 18 August 1998 and 3–1 against Scotland on 19 August 2003. In a 2012 survey carried out by the Norwegian Players' Association among away-team captains, Skagerak Arena was ranked tenth amongst league stadiums, with a score of 3.07 on a scale from one to five.
