= Asbjørn Helgeland =

Norwegian footballer and coach (born 1966)

Personal information
- Date of birth: 4 February 1966 (age 60)
- Place of birth: Norway
- Height: 1.82 m (6 ft 0 in)
- Position: Midfielder

Senior career*
Years	Team	Apps	(Gls)
- Djerv 1919
- Vålerenga
- Fyllingen
1994–1998	Haugesund		
1999–2000	Örebro		
2000	Haugesund		
- Djerv 1919

Managerial career
- 2000–2002: Haugesund (assistant coach)
- 2009–present: Haugesund (managing director)
- * Club domestic league appearances and goals

Asbjørn Helgeland (born 4 February 1966) is a Norwegian football coach and former player.

He started his career in Djerv 1919; and later played for Vålerenga and Fyllingen. He joined the newly founded club FK Haugesund ahead of the 1994 season, and became a stalwart in the team. He left FK Haugesund in 1998, went on trial in China but played for Örebro SK in 1999. He returned to FK Haugesund in the summer of 2000 as playing assistant coach, but left the club after the 2000 season. He continued as assistant coach under Kjell-Inge Bråtveit, who was fired after the 2002 season.

Helgeland continued his playing career in Djerv 1919. In 2007, he reached the milestone of scoring 200 goals for the team. He was still active as of autumn 2008.

In December 2008 Helgeland was hired as managing director in FK Haugesund. He had previously rejected a job offer as player developer in late 2006.
