= 2006 Molde FK season =

Molde
2006 season
- Chairman: Oddne Hansen
- Head coach: Arild Stavrum
- Stadium: Aker Stadion
- Tippeligaen: 14th (relegated)
- Norwegian Cup: Third Round vs. Follo
- UEFA Cup: First Round vs. Rangers
- Top goalscorer: League: Pape Paté Diouf (5); All: Madiou Konate (10)
- Highest home attendance: 9,215 vs. Rosenborg (13 August 2006)
- Lowest home attendance: 4,351 vs. Sandefjord (5 November 2006)
- Average home league attendance: 6,127

The 2006 season was Molde's 31st season in the top flight of Norwegian football. In Tippeligaen they finished 14th and were relegated to the 2007 Norwegian First Division. Molde also competed in the Norwegian Cup where they were knocked out in the third round by Follo.

As winners of the 2005 Norwegian Football Cup, Molde qualified for the 2006–07 UEFA Cup second qualifying round. Molde managed to qualify for the first round where they were defeated 2–0 on aggregate by Scottish club Rangers.

== Squad ==
Note: Flags indicate national team as defined under FIFA eligibility rules; some limited exceptions apply. Players may hold more than one non-FIFA nationality.

No.	Pos.	Nation	Player
1	GK	NOR	Knut Dørum Lillebakk
3	DF	SWE	Marcus Andreasson
4	DF	FIN	Toni Kallio
5	DF	NOR	Øyvind Gjerde
6	MF	NOR	Daniel Berg Hestad (Captain)
7	MF	NOR	Thomas Mork
8	MF	NOR	Marcus Bakke
9	MF	NOR	Magne Hoseth
10	MF	NOR	Stian Ohr
11	MF	NOR	Tommy Eide Møster
12	GK	NOR	Lars Ivar Moldskred
13	DF	GHA	Habib Mohamed (on loan from King Faisal Babes)
14	MF	NOR	John Andreas Husøy
15	MF	NOR	Petter Rudi

No.	Pos.	Nation	Player
16	DF	NOR	Erlend Ormbostad
17	DF	NOR	Trond Strande
18	MF	NOR	Øyvind Gram
19	DF	NOR	Knut Olav Rindarøy
20	FW	NOR	Rune Ertsås
21	MF	CAN	Sandro Grande
22	GK	NOR	Jan Kjell Larsen
23	FW	ISL	Marel Baldvinsson
24	DF	SVN	Matej Mavric
26	FW	SEN	Madiou Konate
30	MF	NOR	Peter Berg Hestad
33	DF	NOR	Petter Christian Singsaas
42	FW	SEN	Pape Paté Diouf

As of end of season.

== Transfers ==
=== In ===
Date	Position	Nationality	Name	From	FeeSC de Rufisque
January 2006	FW	(Senegal)	Pape Paté Diouf	(Senegal) SC de Rufisque	Unknown
7 January 2006	GK	(Norway)	Jan Kjell Larsen	(Norway) Haugesund	Unknown
25 March 2006	MF	(Canada)	Sandro Grande	(Norway) Viking	Unknown
19 July 2006	MF	(Norway)	Magne Hoseth	(Norway) Vålerenga	Unknown
23 August 2006	FW	(Iceland)	Marel Baldvinsson	(Iceland) Breiðablik	Unknown

=== Out ===
Date	Position	Nationality	Name	To	Fee
23 July 2006	FW	(Canada)	Rob Friend	(Netherlands) Heerenveen	

=== Loans in ===
Date from	Date to	Position	Nationality	Name	From
1 April 2006	30 June 2006	FW	(Denmark)	Denni Conteh	(Denmark) OB
1 September 2006	31 December 2006	MF	(Ghana)	Habib Mohamed	(Ghana) King Faisal Babes

=== Loans out ===
Date from	Date to	Position	Nationality	Name	To

=== Trial ===
Date From	Date To	Position	Nationality	Name	Last club
January 2006	January 2006	FW	(Senegal)	Pape Paté Diouf	(Senegal) SC de Rufisque

== Competitions ==
=== Tippeligaen ===
==== Results summary ====
Overall								Home						Away					
Pld	W	D	L	GF	GA	GD	Pts	W	D	L	GF	GA	GD	W	D	L	GF	GA	GD
26	7	4	15	29	50	−21	25	5	2	6	19	18	+1	2	2	9	10	32	−22

Last updated: 27 November 2017.

==== Results by round ====
Round	1	2	3	4	5	6	7	8	9	10	11	12	13	14	15	16	17	18	19	20	21	22	23	24	25	26
Ground	H	A	H	A	H	A	H	A	H	A	A	H	A	H	A	A	H	A	H	A	H	A	H	H	A	H
Result	W	D	L	W	L	L	W	L	D	L	W	L	L	W	L	L	L	L	W	D	W	L	L	D	L	L
Position	1	2	8	5	8	9	6	7	6	11	7	11	11	10	12	13	14	14	12	12	11	12	13	14	14	14

Source: see below
A = Away; H = Home; W = Win; D = Draw; L = Loss

==== Results ====
9 April 2006 1	Molde	3 – 1	Tromsø	Molde
18:00 CET (UTC+1)	Ohr 17'; Berg Hestad 70', (red card) 76'; Konate 73'	Report	Årst 75'; Kibebe (yellow card) 88'	Stadium: Molde Stadion; Attendance: 6,715; Referee: Svein Oddvar Moen, Haugar

17 April 2006 2	Odd Grenland	0 – 0	Molde	Skien
18:00 CET (UTC+1)	Amundsen (yellow card) 66'	Report	Grande (yellow card) 70'	Stadium: Odd Stadion; Attendance: 6,100; Referee: Roy Helge Olsen, Flekkerøy

23 April 2006 3	Molde	0 – 1	Lyn	Molde
18:00 CET (UTC+1)	Konate (yellow card) 68'; Larsen (yellow card) 90'	Report	Eriksen (yellow card) 45'; Hoff 58'	Stadium: Molde Stadion; Attendance: 5,838; Referee: Kristoffer Helgerud, Lier

30 April 2006 4	Rosenborg	0 – 1	Molde	Trondheim
18:00 CET (UTC+1)	Mikael Dorsin (yellow card) 41'; Basma (yellow card) 90'; Riseth (yellow card) 90'	Report	Rudi 13' (pen.); Bakke (yellow card) 27'; Grande (yellow card) 46'; Friend (yellow card) 89'	Stadium: Lerkendal Stadion; Attendance: 21,403; Referee: Tom Henning Øvrebø, Nordstrand

3 May 2006 5	Molde	0 – 2	Brann	Molde
18:00 CET (UTC+1)	Friend (yellow card) 90'	Report	Miller 31'; Haugen (yellow card) 67'; Knudsen (yellow card) 72'; Vaagan Moen 90'	Stadium: Molde Stadion; Attendance: 7,875; Referee: Per Ivar Staberg, Malmefjorden

8 May 2006 6	Viking	3 – 1	Molde	Stavanger
19:00 CET (UTC+1)	Kovács 19'; Nhleko 45', 88'; Soma (yellow card) 54'	Report	Ohr (yellow card) 79'; Konate 85'; Bakke (yellow card) 90'	Stadium: Viking Stadion; Attendance: 11,651; Referee: Espen Berntsen, Fart

13 May 2006 7	Molde	4 – 0	Fredrikstad	Molde
18:00 CET (UTC+1)	Konate 12'; Mavric 41' (pen.); Singsaas (yellow card) 55'; Friend 64', 70'	Report	Piiroja (yellow card) 9'	Stadium: Molde Stadion; Attendance: 5,198; Referee: Brage Sandmoen, Kjelsås

16 May 2006 8	Lillestrøm	3 – 0	Molde	Lillestrøm
18:00 CET (UTC+1)	Occéan 19', 34'; Mifsud 29'	Report	Mavric (yellow card) 33'; Gram (yellow card) 47'	Stadium: Åråsen Stadion; Attendance: 10,010; Referee: Tommy Skjerven, Kaupanger

21 May 2006 9	Molde	1 – 1	Start	Molde
18:00 CET (UTC+1)	Konate (yellow card) 45'; Singsaas 90'	Report	Johnsen 11'; Hanssen (yellow card) 82'; Valencia (yellow card) 90'; Jónsson (yellow card) 90'	Stadium: Molde Stadion; Attendance: 5,379; Referee: Kjell Alseth, Stjørdals-Blink

28 May 2006 10	Vålerenga	2 – 0	Molde	Oslo
18:00 CET (UTC+1)	Freddy dos Santos 11', 23'	Report	Konate (yellow card) 40'; Rindarøy (yellow card) 45+1'; Friend (yellow card) 64'	Stadium: Ullevaal Stadion; Attendance: 10,932; Referee: Svein Oddvar Moen, Haugar

5 June 2006 11	HamKam	1 – 2	Molde	Hamar
18:00 CET (UTC+1)	Abiodun 16', (yellow card) 77'; Pasoja (yellow card) 39'; Johansen (yellow card) 69'; Rønningen (yellow card) 85'	Report	Diouf 29', 73'; Mavric (yellow card) 55'; Singsaas (yellow card) 70' Berg Hestad (yellow card) 75'; Larsen (yellow card) 88'	Stadium: Briskeby Stadion; Attendance: 6,122; Referee: Jonny Ditlefsen, Mo

2 July 2006 12	Molde	1 – 3	Stabæk	Molde
18:00 CET (UTC+1)	Gram (yellow card) 9'; Rindarøy (yellow card) 30'; Konate 39', (yellow card) 71'	Report	Jansson 32'; Olsen (yellow card) 54', (goal) 68'; Stenersen (yellow card) 79'; Alanzinho 81'	Stadium: Molde Stadion; Attendance: 5,724; Referee: Kjetil Sælen, Arna-Bjørnar

16 July 2006 13	Sandefjord	5 – 2	Molde	Sandefjord
18:00 CET (UTC+1)	Isaksen 9'; Andersson (yellow card) 31'; Mjelde 35'; Knarvik 50'; Thorsen 62'; Madsen 73'	Report	Kallio (yellow card) 3'; Strande 27'; Diouf 69'; Ertsås (yellow card) 90'	Stadium: Storstadion; Attendance: 4,126; Referee: Svein-Erik Edvartsen, Hamar

22 July 2006 14	Molde	2 – 0	Odd Grenland	Molde
16:00 CET (UTC+1)	Diouf 15', 17'; Gram (yellow card) 90'	Report	Toresen (yellow card) 45'; Könönen (yellow card) 71'	Stadium: Molde Stadion; Attendance: 7,344; Referee: Kjetil Sælen, Arna-Bjørnar

30 July 2006 15	Tromsø	2 – 0	Molde	Tromsø
18:00 CET (UTC+1)	Rushfeldt 45'; Reginiussen (yellow card) 45'; Årst 77' (pen.)	Report	Hoseth (yellow card) 14'; Strande (yellow card) 30'; Rindarøy (yellow card) 38'; Mork (yellow card) 90'	Stadium: Alfheim Stadion; Attendance: 4,312; Referee: Svein-Erik Edvartsen, Hamar

6 August 2006 16	Lyn	2 – 0	Molde	Oslo
18:00 CET (UTC+1)	Hoff (yellow card) 25'; Edu 56'; Simonsen 73'	Report	Berg Hestad (yellow card) 37'; Mork (yellow card) 70'	Stadium: Ullevaal Stadion; Attendance: 2,563; Referee: Per Ivar Staberg, Malmefjorden

13 August 2006 17	Molde	0 – 2	Rosenborg	Molde
20:00 CET (UTC+1)	Rindarøy (yellow card) 29'	Report	Braaten 42'; Koné 90'	Stadium: Molde Stadion; Attendance: 9,215; Referee: Roy Helge Olsen, Flekkerøy

27 August 2006 18	Brann	2 – 1	Molde	Bergen
18:00 CET (UTC+1)	Winters 56'; Sæternes 82'	Report	Mavric (yellow card) 24'; Berg Hestad 35'; Kallio (yellow card) 49'	Stadium: Brann Stadion; Attendance: 17,360; Referee: Svein Oddvar Moen, Haugar

10 September 2006 19	Molde	3 – 1	Viking	Molde
18:00 CET (UTC+1)	Hoseth 22' (pen.), 61'; Grande (yellow card) 24'; Andreasson 53'; Rindarøy (yellow card) 75'; Konate (yellow card) 90'	Report	Soma (yellow card) 18'; Berg (yellow card) 24'; Ødegaard 83'	Stadium: Molde Stadion; Attendance: 5,506; Referee: Brage Sandmoen, Kjelsås

17 September 2006 20	Fredrikstad	1 – 1	Molde	Fredrikstad
18:00 CET (UTC+1)	Tóth 5'; Kvisvik (yellow card) 71'; Szekeres (yellow card) 79'	Report	Hoseth (yellow card) 6', (goal) 76'; Eide Møster (yellow card) 45'; Kallio (yellow card) 49'; Ohr (yellow card) 55'	Stadium: Fredrikstad Stadion; Attendance: 6,986; Referee: Kjetil Sælen, Arna-Bjørnar

24 September 2006 21	Molde	2 – 0	Lillestrøm	Molde
18:00 CET (UTC+1)	Baldvinsson 49'; Mavric 78'	Report	Andresen (yellow card) 50'	Stadium: Molde Stadion; Attendance: 5,675; Referee: Tom Henning Øvrebø, Nordstrand

1 October 2006 22	Start	3 – 2	Molde	Kristiansand
18:00 CET (UTC+1)	Bärlin 12'; Nielsen (yellow card) 59', (goal) 63'; Johnsen 71'	Report	Mavric 29'; Berg Hestad 33'	Stadium: Kristiansand Stadion; Attendance: 6,675; Referee: Kjell Alseth, Stjørdals-Blink

15 October 2006 23	Molde	0 – 3	Vålerenga	Molde
18:00 CET (UTC+1)		Report	Berre (yellow card) 26'; Fredheim Holm 45', 66'; Sørensen 51'	Stadium: Molde Stadion; Attendance: 6,729; Referee: Tommy Skjerven, Kaupanger

22 October 2006 24	Molde	1 – 1	HamKam	Molde
18:00 CET (UTC+1)	Hoseth 32'; Baldvinsson (yellow card) 85'	Report	Gullerud 47'; Johansen (yellow card) 53'	Stadium: Molde Stadion; Attendance: 5,404; Referee: Roy Helge Olsen, Flekkerøy

29 October 2006 25	Stabæk	8 – 0	Molde	Bærum
18:00 CET (UTC+1)	Tchoyi 21'; Keller 30'; Nannskog 31', 47', 77'; Veigar Páll Gunnarsson 44' (pen.), 49'; Hauger 79'	Report	Larsen (red card) 42'; Kallio (yellow card) 45'	Stadium: Nadderud Stadion; Attendance: 4,388; Referee: Svein Oddvar Moen, Haugar

5 November 2006 26	Molde	2 – 3	Sandefjord	Molde
18:00 CET (UTC+1)	Andreasson 13'; Eide Møster (yellow card) 65'; Baldvinsson (red card) 67'; Kallio 79'	Report	Andersson 18'; Kjølner (yellow card) 26'; Thorsen 29'; Adriano 82'	Stadium: Molde Stadion; Attendance: 4,351; Referee: Terje Hauge, Hordaland

==== Table ====
Pos	Team	Pld	W	D	L	GF	GA	GD	Pts	Qualification or relegation
10	Tromsø	26	8	5	13	33	39	−6	29	
11	Viking	26	8	5	13	31	37	−6	29	
12	Odd Grenland (O)	26	7	8	11	30	38	−8	29	Qualification for the relegation play-offs
13	Ham-Kam (R)	26	7	7	12	35	39	−4	28	Relegation to First Division
14	Molde (R)	26	7	4	15	29	50	−21	25	Relegation to First Division

Source: fotball.no
Rules for classification: 1) points; 2) goal difference; 3) number of goals scored.
(O) Play-off winners; (R) Relegated

=== Norwegian Cup ===
10 May 2006 First Round	Surnadal	1 – 6	Molde	Surnadal
18:00 CEST (UTC+1)	Kvendset 84'	Report	Conteh 5', 17'; Mavrič 9' (pen.); Gram 29', 90'; Husøy 63'	Stadium: Syltøran Stadion; Attendance: 861; Referee: Ole Bjørn Moen

8 June 2006 Second Round	KIL/Hemne	1 – 11	Molde	Kyrksæterøra
18:00 CEST (UTC+2)	Helland 76'	Report	Mavrič 12' (pen.); Konate 16', 35', 70', 72', 79'; Ohr 20'; Berg Hestad 33'; Diouf 50'; Gjerde 69'; Rindarøy 85'	Stadium: Sparebanken Hemne Arena; Referee: Geir Tjervaag

5 July 2006 Third Round	Follo	3 – 2	Molde	Ski
18:00 CEST (UTC+2)	Rosen 24' (pen.); Enckell 85'; Maruti 118'	Report	Konate 10'; Berg Hestad 66'	Stadium: Ski Stadion; Referee: Svein-Erik Edvartsen

=== UEFA Cup ===
==== Qualifying rounds ====
10 August 2006 Second qualifying round 1st Leg	Molde (Norway)	0 – 0	(Latvia) Skonto	Molde
19:00 CET (UTC+1)		Summary		Stadium: Aker Stadion

24 August 2006 Second qualifying round 2nd Leg	Skonto (Latvia)	1 – 2 (1 – 2 agg.)	(Norway) Molde	Riga
19:00 CET (UTC+1)	Astafjevs 68'	Report	Mavric 42'; Ohr 60'	Stadium: Skonto Stadium; Attendance: 4,000; Referee: Veatsjeslav Banari, Moldova

==== First round ====
14 September 2006 First round 1st Leg	Molde (Norway)	0 – 0	(Scotland) Rangers	Molde
20:05 CET (UTC+1)		Summary		Stadium: Aker Stadion; Referee: Jacek Granat, Poland

28 September 2006 First round 2nd Leg	Rangers (Scotland)	2 – 0 (2 – 0 agg.)	(Norway) Molde	Glasgow
20:45 CET (UTC+1)	Buffel 12'; Ferguson 45'	Summary		Stadium: Ibrox Stadium; Referee: Knut Kircher, Germany

== Squad statistics ==
=== Appearances and goals ===
Note: The Norwegian Cup second-round game vs KIL/Hemne lacks information. 2-4 players miss one game because of this. The players mentioned in the match summary in Romsdals Budstikke after the game are included in the statistics.

No.	Pos	Nat	Player	Total		Tippeligaen		Norwegian Cup		UEFA Cup	
No.	Pos	Nat	Player	Apps	Goals	Apps	Goals	Apps	Goals	Apps	Goals
1	GK	(Norway) NOR	Knut Dørum Lillebakk	3	0	1+1	0	1	0	0	0
3	DF	(Sweden) SWE	Marcus Andreasson	14	2	10+2	2	0	0	2	0
4	DF	(Finland) FIN	Toni Kallio	30	1	14+10	1	0+2	0	4	0
5	DF	(Norway) NOR	Øyvind Gjerde	20	1	14+2	0	2	1	0+2	0
6	MF	(Norway) NOR	Daniel Berg Hestad	31	5	24	3	3	2	4	0
7	MF	(Norway) NOR	Thomas Mork	16	0	7+6	0	0+2	0	1	0
8	MF	(Norway) NOR	Marcus Bakke	9	0	6+2	0	1	0	0	0
9	MF	(Norway) NOR	Magne Hoseth	22	4	15+4	4	0	0	3	0
10	MF	(Norway) NOR	Stian Ohr	33	3	26	1	3	1	4	1
11	MF	(Norway) NOR	Tommy Eide Møster	16	0	4+7	0	2	0	1+2	0
12	GK	(Norway) NOR	Lars Ivar Moldskred	0	0	0	0	0	0	0	0
13	DF	(Ghana) GHA	Habib Mohammed	0	0	0	0	0	0	0	0
15	MF	(Norway) NOR	Petter Rudi	31	1	26	1	1	0	4	0
16	DF	(Norway) NOR	Erlend Ormbostad	1	0	0	0	1	0	0	0
17	DF	(Norway) NOR	Trond Strande	14	1	11	1	1	0	1+1	0
18	MF	(Norway) NOR	Øyvind Gram	9	2	6+1	0	2	2	0	0
19	DF	(Norway) NOR	Knut Olav Rindarøy	27	1	19+1	0	3	1	4	0
20	FW	(Norway) NOR	Rune Ertsås	7	0	0+6	0	0	0	0+1	0
21	MF	(Canada) CAN	Sandro Grande	18	0	10+4	0	0	0	3+1	0
22	GK	(Norway) NOR	Jan Kjell Larsen	31	0	25	0	2	0	4	0
23	FW	(Iceland) ISL	Marel Baldvinsson	8	1	7	1	0	0	1	0
24	DF	(Slovenia) SVN	Matej Mavric	27	6	18+3	3	2+1	2	3	1
26	FW	(Senegal) SEN	Madiou Konate	25	10	14+5	4	2	6	2+2	0
30	MF	(Norway) NOR	Peter Berg Hestad	1	0	0+1	0	0	0	0	0
33	DF	(Norway) NOR	Petter Christian Singsaas	19	0	16	0	1	0	2	0
42	FW	(Senegal) SEN	Pape Paté Diouf	20	6	8+6	5	2+1	1	1+2	0
Players who left Molde during the season:
9	FW	(Canada) CAN	Rob Friend	9	2	9	2	0	0	0	0
14	MF	(Norway) NOR	John Andreas Husøy	3	1	0+1	0	1+1	1	0	0
23	FW	(Denmark) DEN	Denni Conteh	6	2	0+5	0	1	2	0	0

=== Goal Scorers ===
Place	Position	Nation	Number	Name	Tippeligaen	Norwegian Cup	UEFA Cup	Total
1	FW	(Senegal)	26	Madiou Konate	4	6	0	10
2	FW	(Senegal)	42	Pape Paté Diouf	5	1	0	6
2	DF	(Slovenia)	24	Matej Mavric	3	2	1	6
4	DF	(Norway)	6	Daniel Berg Hestad	3	2	0	5
5	MF	(Norway)	10	Magne Hoseth	4	0	0	4
6	FW	(Norway)	10	Stian Ohr	1	1	1	3
7	FW	(Canada)	9	Rob Friend	2	0	0	2
7	DF	(Sweden)	3	Marcus Andreasson	2	0	0	2
7	FW	(Denmark)	23	Denni Conteh	0	2	0	2
7	MF	(Norway)	18	Øyvind Gram	0	2	0	2
11	DF	(Norway)	17	Trond Strande	1	0	0	1
11	DF	(Finland)	4	Toni Kallio	1	0	0	1
11	FW	(Iceland)	23	Marel Baldvinsson	1	0	0	1
11	MF	(Norway)	15	Petter Rudi	1	0	0	1
11	DF	(Norway)	33	Petter Christian Singsaas	1	0	0	1
11	DF	(Norway)	5	Øyvind Gjerde	0	1	0	1
11	MF	(Norway)	14	John Andreas Husøy	0	1	0	1
11	DF	(Norway)	19	Knut Olav Rindarøy	0	1	0	1
				TOTALS	29	19	2	50

== See also ==
- Molde FK seasons
