= 2006 Norwegian Football Cup =

Norgesmesterskapet i fotball for herrer

Tournament details
- Country: Norway
- Teams: 128 (main competition)

Final positions
- Champions: Fredrikstad (11th title)
- Runners-up: Sandefjord

Tournament statistics
- Matches played: 127
- Goals scored: 558 (4.39 per match)
- Top goal scorer(s): Roman Kienast; Steffen Iversen; Tor Henning Hamre (8 goals each)

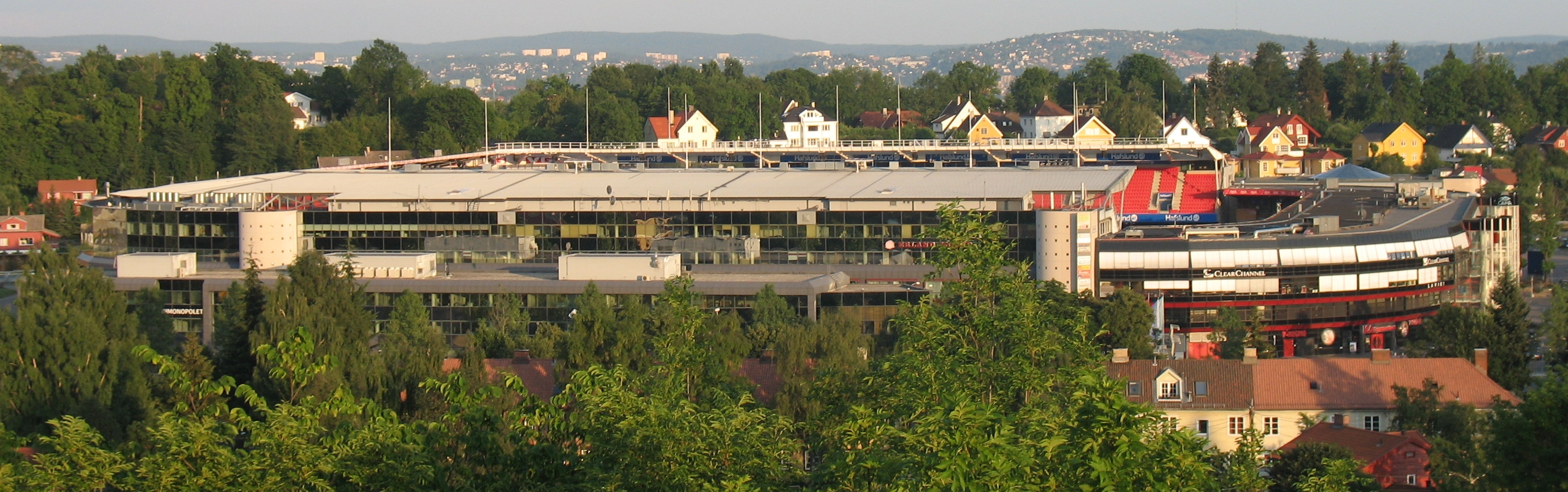
Ullevaal Stadion, Oslo - venue for the Norwegian Cup final

The 2006 Norwegian Football Cup was the 101st edition of the Norwegian annual football knock-out tournament. The tournament started on 10 May and was contested by 128 teams, going through 7 rounds before a winner could be declared. The final match was played on 12 November at Ullevaal Stadium, and marked the end of the 2006 Norwegian football season.

== Calendar ==
Below are the dates for each round as given by the official schedule:

Round	Date(s)	Number of fixtures	Clubs
First Round	10–11 May 2006	64	128 → 64
Second Round	8 June 2006	32	64 → 32
Third Round	5 July 2006	16	32 → 16
Fourth Round	19–20 July 2006	8	16 → 8
Quarter-finals	19–20 August 2006	4	8 → 4
Semi-finals	20–21 September 2006	2	4 → 2
Final	12 November 2006	1	2 → 1

== First round ==
Team 1	Score	Team 2
10 May 2006
Åkra	0–3	Haugesund
Åmot	0–1	Gjøvik-Lyn
Årdal	4–4 (8–7 p)	Stryn
Arendal	1–10	Start
Åsane	1–2	Voss
Asker	2–4	Stabæk
Askøy	4–2	Vadmyra
Birkebeineren	1–5	Hønefoss
Brumunddal	0–3	Sprint-Jeløy
Charlottenlund	0–2	Strindheim
Egersund	0–2	Ålgård
Eik-Tønsberg	1–4	Pors Grenland
Fana	2–0	Lyngbø
Flekkerøy	4–1	Sandnes Ulf
Follese	0–1	Brann
Førde	0–4	Sogndal
Fossum	0–4	Lyn
Frigg	0–2	Manglerud Star
Frøyland	1–6	Viking
Fu/Vo	2–4	Moss
Groruddalen	3–0	Elverum
Grovfjord	0–5	Tromsø
Hadeland	0–6	Follo
Hammerfest	3–2 (a.e.t.)	Alta
Høland	0–3	Lillestrøm
Hovding	1–5	Løv-Ham
Kirkenes	1–5	Tromsdalen
Klemetsrud	2–7	Strømsgodset
Klepp	3–1	Randaberg
Kristiansund	0–2	KIL/Hemne
Kvik	1–8	Rosenborg
Kvik Halden	1–7	Fredrikstad
Larvik Turn	0–4	Sandefjord
Levanger	1–0	Mo
Lillehammer	4–3 (a.e.t.)	Ull/Kisa
Lisleby	1–1 (7–6 p)	Sparta Sarpsborg
Lofoten	1–3	Harstad
Mjøndalen	2–3	Skeid
Namsos	0–3	Steinkjer
Nardo	1–3	Byåsen
Ørn Horten	1–2	Eidsvold Turn
Ranheim	3–2	Verdal
Ringebu/Fåvang	1–7	HamKam
Sander	0–4	Kongsvinger
Sarpsborg FK	4–6 (a.e.t.)	Korsvoll
Skarbøvik	0–2	Aalesund
Skarp	6–3 (a.e.t.)	Lyngen/Karnes
Skotfoss	0–3	Odd Grenland
Stange	1–8	Vålerenga
Surnadal	1–6	Molde
Stavanger	2–3 (a.e.t.)	Bryne
Steigen	2–3	Bodø/Glimt
Stord Sunnhordland	2–5	Fyllingen
Sykkylven	1–4	Hødd
FK Tønsberg	12–1	Røa
Vardal	1–4	Raufoss
11 May 2006
Drøbak/Frogn	8–2	Grorud
Fram Larvik	0–1	Kolstad
Kjelsås	4–0	Jevnaker
Lørenskog	1–0	Nybergsund
Notodden	7–2	Tønsberg FK
Tollnes	0–1	Bærum
Mandalskameratene	5–0	Vigør
Vard Haugesund	2–3 (a.e.t.)	Kopervik

== Second round ==
Team 1	Score	Team 2
7 June 2006
Lørenskog	2–4	Lillestrøm
8 June 2006
Lisleby	1–4	Lyn
Sprint/Jeløy	1–2	Fredrikstad
Korsvoll	0–2	Odd Grenland
Bærum	0–1	Sandefjord
Lillehammer	0–6	Vålerenga
Gjøvik-Lyn	2–3	HamKam
Flekkerøy	1–3	Viking
Kopervik	1–7	Start
Voss	0–4	Brann
KIL/Hemne	1–11	Molde
Kolstad	0–1	Stabæk
Steinkjer	0–4	Rosenborg
Hammerfest	0–3	Tromsø
Moss	3–0	Kjelsås
Manglerud Star	5–3	Fana
Skeid	2–0	Notodden
Eidsvold Turn	2–3	Kongsvinger
Raufoss	3–0	Groruddalen
Strømsgodset	4–0	FK Tønsberg
Pors Grenland	6–0	Drøbak/Frogn
Ålgård	1–4	Mandalskameratene
Klepp	1–2	Bryne
Fyllingen	2–5	Hønefoss
Askøy	0–2	Haugesund
Sogndal	5–0	Årdal
Aalesund	8–1	Ranheim
Byåsen	1–3	Løv-Ham
Strindheim	0–3	Follo
Levanger	4–1	Hødd
Bodø/Glimt	4–1	Skarp
Tromsdalen	1–2	Harstad

== Third round ==
This was the last round in which the Norwegian FA determined match-ups.

Team 1	Score	Team 2
5 July 2006
Follo	3–2	Molde
Lyn	4–2	Pors Grenland
HamKam	3–1	Moss
Hønefoss	1–2	Vålerenga
Kongsvinger	2–3	Fredrikstad
Rosenborg	2–1 (a.e.t.)	Raufoss
Brann	3–1	Levanger
Mandalskameratene	4–1	Odd Grenland
Viking	4–0	Manglerud Star
Haugesund	1–1 (5–6 p)	Start
Bodø/Glimt	4–2	Tromsø
Harstad	1–5	Lillestrøm
Løv-Ham	1–2	Aalesund
12 July 2006
Stabæk	2–2 (3–4 p)	Sogndal
Bryne	3–1	Strømsgodset
Sandefjord	3–2	Skeid

== Fourth round ==
From this round onwards, matches were drawn by lots.

19 July 2006
18:00 CEST (UTC+2)

Vålerenga	2–1	Aalesund
dos Santos 81'; Storbæk 90'	Report	Werni 58'

Ullevaal Stadion, Oslo
Attendance: 5,046
Referee: Kjetil Sælen

19 July 2006
18:00 CEST (UTC+2)

Fredrikstad	2–2 (a.e.t.)	Bryne
Bjørkøy 13' (pen.); Hoås 96'	Report	Piiroja 70' (o.g.); Hægeland 108'
Penalties
Brenne (penalty scored); Kvisvik (penalty scored); Bjørkøy (penalty scored); Tóth (penalty scored)	4–2	(penalty missed) Oyuga; (penalty scored) Rashid; (penalty scored) Borgvardt; (penalty missed) Hægeland

Fredrikstad Stadion, Fredrikstad
Attendance: 1,846
Referee: Tom Henning Øvrebø

19 July 2006
18:00 CEST (UTC+2)

Rosenborg	1–0	Mandalskameratene
Iversen 86'	Report

Lerkendal Stadion, Trondheim
Attendance: 2,341
Referee: Kristoffer Helgerud

19 July 2006
18:00 CEST (UTC+2)

Sogndal	1–2 (a.e.t.)	Follo
Flo 48'	Report	Sundsbø 82'; Birkeland 103'

Fosshaugane Campus, Sogndalsfjøra
Attendance: 1,503
Referee: Tom Harald Hagen

19 July 2006
18:00 CEST (UTC+2)

HamKam	2–3	Sandefjord
Kienast 20', 64'	Report	Andersson 19'; Thorsen 85'; Knarvik 88' (pen.)

Briskeby Gressbane, Hamar
Attendance: 1,456
Referee: Tommy Skjerven

19 July 2006
20:00 CEST (UTC+2)

Lillestrøm	2–1	Lyn
Koren 44'; Mifsud 56'	Report	Hoff 88'

Åråsen Stadion, Lillestrøm
Attendance: 2,798
Referee: Roy Helge Olsen

20 July 2006
18:00 CEST (UTC+2)

Viking	5–0	Bodø/Glimt
Abelsson 45'; Berg 70', 85'; Ijeh 75', 81'	Report

Viking Stadion, Stavanger
Attendance: 2,180
Referee: Espen Berntsen

20 July 2006
19:00 CEST (UTC+2)

Start	3–1	Brann
Hæstad 5'; Nielsen 45'; Bärlin 70'	Report	Sigurðsson 68'

Kristiansand Stadion, Kriistiansand
Attendance: 4,486
Referee: Svein Oddvar Moen

== Quarter-finals ==
19 August 2006
16:00 CEST (UTC+2)

Vålerenga	0–3	Fredrikstad
	Report	Tóth 40', 80'; Bjørkøy 58'

Ullevaal Stadion, Oslo
Attendance: 7,516
Referee: Terje Hauge

19 August 2006
19:00 CEST (UTC+2)

Start	3–2 (a.e.t.)	Lillestrøm
Nielsen 5', 30'; Valencia 119'	Report	Sundgot 9', 90+4'

Kristiansand Stadion, Kriistiansand
Attendance: 4,985
Referee: Kjell Alseth

20 August 2006
16:00 CEST (UTC+2)

Follo	0–1	Sandefjord
	Report	Knarvik 33'

Ski Stadion, Ski
Attendance: 1,416
Referee: Kjetil Sælen

20 August 2006
19:00 CEST (UTC+2)

Viking	1–3	Rosenborg
Ødegaard 59'	Report	Dorsin 17'; Storflor 54'; Tettey 60'

Viking Stadion, Stavanger
Attendance: 6,744
Referee: Brage Sandmoen

== Semi-finals ==
20 September 2006
19:00 CEST (UTC+2)

Fredrikstad	3–2 (a.e.t.)	Start
Elyounoussi 61'; Brenne 73'; Piiroja 99'	Report	Fevang 10'; Jónsson 90+3'

Fredrikstad Stadion, Fredrikstad
Attendance: 9,396
Referee: Tommy Skjerven

21 September 2006
19:00 CEST (UTC+2)

Rosenborg	2–5	Sandefjord
Iversen 41'; Solli 57'	Report	Tegström 16'; Zanetti 18', 28'; Madsen 35'; Thorsen 61'

Lerkendal Stadion, Trondheim
Attendance: 11‚000
Referee: Espen Berntsen

== Final ==
12 November 2006
13:15 CET (UTC+1)

Fredrikstad	3–0	Sandefjord
Ramberg 5'; Piiroja 37', 43'	Report

Ullevaal Stadion, Oslo
Attendance: 25,102
Referee: Tom Henning Øvrebø (Nordstrand)
