= 2006 Norwegian Football Cup final =

- Event: 2006 Norwegian Football Cup
| Fredrikstad | Sandefjord |
| 3 | 0 |
- Date: 12 November 2006
- Venue: Ullevaal Stadion, Oslo
- Referee: Tom Henning Øvrebø
- Attendance: 25,102

The 2006 Norwegian Football Cup final was the final match of the 2006 Norwegian Football Cup, the 101st season of the Norwegian Football Cup, the premier Norwegian football cup competition organized by the Football Association of Norway (NFF). The match was played on 12 November 2006 at the Ullevaal Stadion in Oslo, and opposed two Tippeligaen sides Fredrikstad and Sandefjord. Fredrikstad defeated Sandefjord 3–0 to claim the Norwegian Cup for an eleventh time in their history.

== Route to the final ==
| Fredrikstad | | | Round | Sandefjord | | |
|---|---|---|---|---|---|---|
| Kvik Halden | A | 7–1 | Round 1 | Larvik Turn | A | 4–0 |
| Sprint-Jeløy | A | 2–1 | Round 2 | Bærum | A | 1–0 |
| Kongsvinger | A | 3–2 | Round 3 | Skeid | H | 3–2 |
| Bryne | H | 2–2 (4–2 p) | Round 4 | HamKam | A | 3–2 |
| Vålerenga | A | 3–0 | Quarterfinal | Follo | A | 1–0 |
| Start | H | 3–2 aet | Semifinal | Rosenborg | A | 5–2 |

== Match ==
=== Details ===
12 November 2006
13:15 CET (UTC+1)

| Fredrikstad | 3–0 | Sandefjord |
|---|---|---|
| Ramberg 5'; Piiroja 37', 43' | Report |

Ullevaal Stadion, Oslo
Attendance: 25,102
Referee: Tom Henning Øvrebø (Nordstrand)

| Fredrikstad | Sandefjord |

Fredrikstad:
| GK | 1 | (Sweden) Rami Shaaban |
| DF | 2 | (Norway) Pål Andre Czwartek | (substituted off) 86' |
| DF | 9 | (Estonia) Raio Piiroja |
| DF | 3 | (Sweden) Patrik Gerrbrand |
| DF | 23 | (Norway) John Anders Bjørkøy (c) |
| MF | 15 | (Norway) Hans Erik Ramberg |
| MF | 18 | (Norway) Christian Berg |
| MF | 7 | (Norway) Simen Brenne |
| FW | 14 | (Norway) Raymond Kvisvik | (substituted off) 88' |
| FW | 21 | (Hungary) Mihály Tóth |
| FW | 13 | (Norway) Tarik Elyounoussi | (substituted off) 73' |
Substitutions:
| FW | 26 | (Costa Rica) Yherland McDonald | (substituted on) 73' |
| DF | 5 | (Norway) Agim Shabani | (substituted on) 86' |
| FW | 6 | (Norway) Øyvind Hoås | (substituted on) 88' |
Coach:
(Norway) Knut Thorbjørn Eggen

Sandefjord:
| GK | 12 | (Norway) Espen Bugge Pettersen |
| DF | 17 | (Norway) Olav Zanetti |
| DF | 24 | (Norway) Fredrik Kjølner | (yellow card) 65' |
| DF | 22 | (Norway) Arnar Førsund | | (substituted off) 80' |
| DF | 3 | (Norway) Tom Kristoffersen (c) | (yellow card) 73' |
| MF | 6 | (Sweden) Mikael Andersson |
| MF | 7 | (Norway) Tommy Knarvik |
| MF | 18 | (Norway) Erik Mjelde | | (substituted off) 88' |
| MF | 9 | (Norway) Fredrik Thorsen | | (substituted off) 57' |
| FW | 11 | (Sweden) Andreas Tegström |
| FW | 10 | (Brazil) Adriano |
Substitutions:
| MF | 16 | (Norway) Samuel Isaksen | | (substituted on) 57' |
| FW | 23 | (United States) Brian Waltrip | | (substituted on) 80' |
| MF | 14 | (Finland) Tuomas Haapala | | (substituted on) 88' |
Coach:
(Norway) Tor Thodesen
