= Hæstad =

Hæstad is a Norwegian surname. Notable people with the surname include:

- Kristofer Hæstad (born 1983), Norwegian footballer
- Morten Hæstad (born 1987), Norwegian footballer
