= Agim Shabani =

Norwegian footballer (born 1988)

Personal information
- Date of birth: 14 February 1988 (age 38)
- Place of birth: SFR Yugoslavia
- Height: 1.83 m (6 ft 0 in)
- Position: Defender

Youth career
- Trosvik

Senior career*
| Years | Team | Apps | (Gls) |
| 2006–2010 | Fredrikstad | 22 | (1) |
| 2011–2012 | Moss | 25 | (3) |
| 2013–2014 | Kvik Halden | | |
| 2015–2017 | Østsiden | | |
- * Club domestic league appearances and goals as of 16 January 2011

Agim Shabani (born 14 February 1988) is a retired Norwegian football defender of Albanian descent.

Shabani moved to Sweden when he was four years old. Then his family moved to Bergen, before they settled down in Fredrikstad in 1999.

Shabani is a local player from the club Trosvik in Fredrikstad, who have raised several Fredrikstad players, Tarik Elyounoussi and Lasse Staw are some of the most notable ones. Shabani played his first official match for Fredrikstad in the 2006 Norwegian Football Cup Final, where Fredrikstad beat Sandefjord 3–0.

In the 2007 season, he managed to get three red cards in three different competitions in four days. His first sending-off came in a Norwegian Premier League match, then next day for Fredrikstad's reserve team in the Norwegian Second Division. Two days later, Fredrikstad played Nybergsund IL-Trysil in the Norwegian Cup, and lost after Shabani was sent off.

He scored his first goal in the Norwegian Premier League 2009, to send Fredrikstad in the lead in a match against Bodø/Glimt, which ended in a 1–1 draw.

He played two seasons for Moss FK before joining Kvik Halden FK ahead of the 2013 season.

== Honors ==
- Norwegian Cup: 2006
