= Tor Thodesen =

Norwegian football coach (born 1966)

Personal information
- Date of birth: 3 March 1966 (age 60)
- Place of birth: Nøtterøy Municipality, Norway
- Height: 1.74 m (5 ft 9 in)
- Position: Goalkeeper

Team information
- Current team: Oslo Football Academy (manager)

Youth career
- Teie

Senior career*
Years	Team	Apps	(Gls)
1985	Teie		
1986–1988	Nøtterøy		
1989–1990	Ready		
1990–1991	Teie		
1992–	Bygdø		

Managerial career
- 1991–1994: Lyn (gk.coach and assistant)
- 1992: Asker women (goalkeeper coach)
- 1992–1993: Asker women
- 1995–1998: Vålerenga (goalkeeper coach)
- 1999: Estonia and Flora Tallinn (assistant)
- 2000–2003: Brann (assistant)
- 2004: Norheimsund
- 2005–2008: Sandefjord
- 2009–2010: Tønsberg
- 2011–2012: Moss
- 2013–2014: Baniyas (assistant)
- 2015: Flint (assistant)
- 2016: Tønsberg (youth/developer)
- 2016: Tønsberg
- 2017–2018: Eik-Tønsberg (youth/director of sports)
- 2018: Hønefoss
- 2019–2020: HIFK
- 2021: Kvik Halden
- 2022–: Oslo Football Academy
- * Club domestic league appearances and goals

Tor Thodesen (born 3 March 1966) is a Norwegian football coach. In 2006, he was awarded the "Coach of the year" award by his colleagues, for his work in Sandefjord.

== Career ==
=== Early years ===
Thodesen played youth football in Teie IF and was drafted into the senior squad in the mid-1980s. In 1986 he moved to neighbours Nøtterøy IF.

He also enrolled in the Norwegian School of Sport Sciences in Oslo. For some time he commuted from Oslo to Nøtterøy to play for his team, but transferred to IF Ready after the 1988 season. In the summer of 1990 he returned to Teie, upon graduation from the Norwegian School of Sport Sciences. While studying and playing, Thodesen also did academy work and goalkeeper coaching in Teie, Nøtterøy and Ready. He was recruited by Per Egil Nygård as an instructor in Oslo Goalkeeper School. In 1991 Thodesen became goalkeeper coach for Lyn, among others for the national team player Einar Rossbach. After the 1991 season he was promoted to assistant manager, and quit his active career for Teie. Thodesen was also goalkeeper coach of Asker' women's team on a part-time basis, and was announced as new head coach in September 1992. He continued in Lyn until the end of the 1994 season, when contract negotiations stalled and he was picked up by Vålerenga. He also worked at the Norwegian School of Elite Sport. Between 1999 and 2002, he joined his former superior in Lyn, Teitur Thordarson, as assistant coach in Flora Tallinn, Estonia and SK Brann.

=== Sandefjord Fotball ===
Thodesen coached Norheimsund IL and won promotion to the Second Division with the small club. In 2005, Thodesen took over Sandefjord Fotball, and led the club to its first promotion to Tippeligaen in his first season, after a dramatical last round in the 2005 Norwegian First Division, where Moss FK were beaten 4–3. Though thought upon by most Norwegian football experts, as the weakest team in the 2006 Norwegian Premier League, Sandefjord managed to retain their spot in Tippeligaen with a 9th place, and qualified to the cup final for the first time in the history of the club.

The following season, Sandefjord won 5 of 30 league matches and were relegated to the First Division. In the next season, Thodesen was fired on 7 May 2008, the day after a humiliating loss to Notodden FK took Sandefjord to a 15th place in Adeccoligaen.

=== Second Division ===
On 31 October 2008 Thodesen signed for the Second Division club FK Tønsberg, and the goal was promotion to the First Division. After two years, he left FK Tønsberg stating that "the current economic situation in the club does not allow a full time coach".

Thodesen was hired as the head coach of Second Division side Moss FK ahead of the 2011 season.

=== UAE and return to Vestfold ===
Following a tenure as assistant manager of Emirati club Baniyas, Thodesen moved back to Vestfold and was hired at Re Upper Secondary School.

Steadily approached by local clubs, he was assistant coach of IL Flint in the autumn of 2015, before being hired as player developer and U16 coach in FK Tønsberg. In the summer of 2016 he became caretaker manager of the men's team. After the season he moved to Eik-Tønsberg as director of sports and U16 coach. He remained until September 2018, when Frode Lafton was sacked as Hønefoss BK manager and Thodesen was hired in his place.

=== Abroad ===
Thodesen was the head coach of HIFK in Finland from 2019 to 2020. After spending 2021 in Kvik Halden FK, Thodesen was hired as manager of the Senegalese second-tier outfit Oslo Football Academy. He was brought to Senegal by Youssoupha Fall, a player agent whom Thodesen had worked with since coaching Sandefjord.

== Honours ==
Individual

- Tippeligaen: coach of the year: 2006
