= Andreas Tegström =

Swedish footballer (born 1979)

Personal information
- Full name: Andreas Ulrik Tegström
- Date of birth: 18 January 1979 (age 47)
- Place of birth: Jönköping, Sweden
- Height: 1.86 m (6 ft 1 in)
- Position: Striker

Team information
- Current team: Sandefjord (Head Coach)

Youth career
- Tenhults IF

Senior career*
Years	Team	Apps	(Gls)
2000	Tenhults IF		
2001–2004	Husqvarna FF	84	(23)
2005–2007	Sandefjord	70	(25)
2007–2010	Fredrikstad	50	(7)
2009	→ Hønefoss (loan)	12	(4)
2011–2012	Jönköpings Södra	45	(12)
2013–2015	Husqvarna FF	66	(21)

Managerial career
- 2015–2020: Assyriska IK
- 2021–: Sandefjord
- * Club domestic league appearances and goals

Andreas Ulrik Tegström (born 18 January 1979) is a Swedish football manager and former player who played as a striker. He is currently the head coach of Eliteserien side Sandefjord. He is also known for his time as a player at Fredrikstad.

Tegström wanted to become a professional ice hockey player while growing up, but he quit playing ice hockey and played football as an amateur for Tenhults IF and Husqvarna FF. He was brought to Sandefjord in 2005 and scored 14 goals in his first season; the club won promotion to Tippeligaen. In Sandefjord's first season in the top-flight, Tegström scored ten goals in the league and played in the 2006 Norwegian Football Cup Final. The next season, he moved to Fredrikstad, where he was not a regular player on the first team. He spent time on loan with Hønefoss in 2009, and he returned to Sweden after the 2010 season when his contract with Fredrikstad expired. After two seasons with the Superettan side Jönköpings Södra, he rejoined Husqvarna FF before the 2013 season.

== Early life ==
As a child, Tegström dreamed of becoming a professional ice hockey player in the NHL and for the Swedish national ice hockey team, Tre kronor. He played for HV71, attended the hockey school in Jönköping, and played football as a hobby. After he quit playing hockey, he worked at the local Intersport store while playing football for Tenhults IF. He later joined Swedish Football Division 2 side Husqvarna FF.

== Club career ==
Tegström scored 22 goals in as many matches in 2004, and was named Player of the Year in the 2004 Swedish football Division 2. The same season, Husqvarna qualified for the promotion play-off where they met Superettan side Mjällby. This match was attended by scouts from the Norwegian First Division side Sandefjord Fotball. Even though the Sandefjord envoys came to watch Mjällby's Marcus Ekenberg, they were more impressed by Tegström—who was playing as a striker. Tegström was also wanted by Superettan sides Trelleborgs FF and Östers IF, but joined Sandefjord ahead of the 2005 season and signed a three-year contract with the club.

=== Sandefjord ===
Tegström became an instant success at Sandefjord and contributed greatly to the club's first-ever promotion to the Tippeligaen, with a total of 14 goals when the club finished second in the 2005 Norwegian First Division. Tegström scored a hat-trick in the decisive match, beating promotion-challengers Moss 4–2; Tegström's teammate Andreas Augustsson scored one goal. Tegström also impressed at the top-flight in Norway, and after scoring five goals in the five first matches of the season he was the leading goalscorer in Tippeligaen, while his team was in fourth place despite being predicted to be in last place by every media outlet in Norway. When Sandefjord played Viking on 24 September 2006, both teams were fighting against relegation and Tegström scored the match-winning goal on a counter-attack after dribbling past half the Viking defence—comparable to Diego Maradona's goal in the 1986 World Cup. Tegström scored ten goals and made five assists in the Tippeligaen, helping Sandefjord avoid relegation in their first year in the top-flight. He also scored the first goal in the semi-final of the 2006 Norwegian Football Cup, which Sandefjord won 5–2 against Rosenborg at Lerkendal Stadion and played in the 2006 Norwegian Football Cup Final, in which the team lost 3–0 to Fredrikstad.

After his performance for Sandefjord in 2006, Expressen said that Tegström was wanted by several Norwegian, Danish and Dutch clubs, but signed a new contract with Sandefjord in December 2006 to the end of the 2009 season. Verdens Gang predicted that the Sandefjord team would finish 11th in the 2007 Tippeligaen, but stated that Tegström had to perform at the same level as in the previous season for Sandefjord to avoid relegation. Tegström scored one goal for Sandefjord in the 2007 season; the team struggled throughout the season until it was relegated to the second tier. Tegström left Sandefjord half-way through the season, when he was sold to Fredrikstad in August 2007 for 4 million Norwegian krone (NOK), according to Sandefjords Blad.

=== Fredrikstad ===
The same day his second child was born, Tegström scored a goal in his debut for Fredrikstad, a 2–0 victory against Stabæk on 3 September 2007. He scored against Strømsgodset in October 2007. The following season, Tegström played as a substitute and scored one goal in the 2–0 victory against Bodø/Glimt, with Fredrikstad leading the 2008 Tippeligaen after four matches. Tegström did not play much for Fredrikstad in the 2008 season because Tarik Elyounoussi and Garðar Jóhannsson were the preferred strikers in the starting lineup. Tegström secured the club's first silver medals since 1972 when he scored two goals against Molde on 26 October 2008; he came on as a substitute in the 63rd minute of the match, which Fredrikstad won 2–1.

Before the 2009 season, Fredrikstad told Tegström that he was not part of the club's long-term plans and that he was welcome to find another club. Fredrikstad turned down an offer from Stabæk to buy the striker. He did not start a single match in the pre-season, but he came on as a substitute and scored a goal against Strømsgodset in the second match of the 2009 season. Tegström spent most of the 2009 season on the bench, but in the 2009 Norwegian Football Cup tie against Ranheim, he came on as a substitute and scored two goals in the extra time.

=== Later career ===
In August 2009, he was loaned out to the First Division side Hønefoss until the end of the season, with an option to buy. In his first match for Hønefoss, Tegström scored a goal against Alta; the game ended with a 2–0 victory. He scored a four goals in 12 matches for Hønefoss. After the season, he returned to Fredrikstad, which had been relegated to the First Division. He was troubled by injuries in his last season with Fredrikstad, and he started only nine matches. Jönköpings Södra wanted to buy Tegström during the summer, but he did not join the club until his contract with Fredrikstad expired after the 2010 season. After playing two seasons for the Superettan side, Tegström returned to Husqvarna ahead of the 2013 season, where in addition to playing for the team, he was hired as chief of marketing.

== Managerial career ==
In December 2015, Tegström was unveiled as the new manager of Assyriska IK in the Swedish Football Division 3.

On 30 December 2020 he was announced as the head coach of his former team Sandefjord, together with Hans Erik Ødegaard, replacing Martí Cifuentes. When Ødegaard left to take over Lillestrøm ahead of the 2025 season, Tegström remained in Sandefjord and took sole charge as manager.
