= Randesund IL =

Norwegian sports club

- Full name: Randesund Idrettslag
- Founded: 1946
- Ground: Sukkevann idrettspark
- League: 4. divisjon
- 2023: 3. divisjon group 4, 14th of 14 (relegated)
Home colours

Randesund IL is a Norwegian sports club from Kristiansand. It has sections for association football, handball, table tennis, tennis and skiing.

The men's football team currently resides in the Fourth Division (fifth tier), but it played in the Third Division in 2004 and as late as 2010. Former senior team players include Raymond Hofstædter. Youth players include Kristofer Hæstad, Morten Hæstad and Lene Mykjåland.
