= Morten Gamst Pedersen =

Norwegian footballer (born 1981)

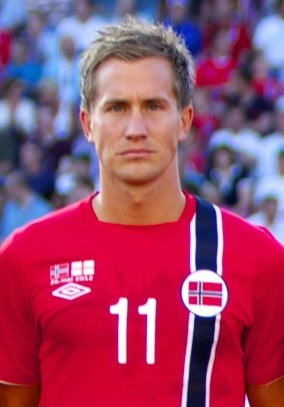
- Pedersen lining up for Norway in 2012

Personal information
- Full name: Morten Gamst Pedersen
- Date of birth: 8 September 1981 (age 45)
- Place of birth: Vadsø, Norway
- Height: 1.83 m (6 ft 0 in)
- Position: Midfielder

Youth career
- 1997–1998: Norild
- 1998–1999: Polarstjernen
- 1999–2000: Norild

Senior career*
Years	Team	Apps	(Gls)
2000–2004	Tromsø	121	(51)
2004–2013	Blackburn Rovers	288	(35)
2013–2014	Karabükspor	10	(0)
2014–2016	Rosenborg	37	(5)
2016–2019	Tromsø	96	(4)
2020–2022	Alta	41	(19)
2022	Åsane	18	(0)
2023–2024	Ranheim	22	(4)
Total		633	(118)

International career
2001–2004	Norway U21	18	(10)
2004–2014	Norway	83	(17)
- * Club domestic league appearances and goals

Morten Gamst Pedersen (born 8 September 1981) is a Norwegian former professional footballer who played as a midfielder. During his spell for Blackburn Rovers in the Premier League he was known for his skill and long range goals.

Pedersen began his career with Tromsø, then played for English side Blackburn Rovers between 2004 and 2013 making a total of 349 appearances. He then played for the Turkish side Karabükspor. He signed with Rosenborg in 2014, and won 2015 Tippeligaen, and the 2015 Norwegian Cup. In February 2016, he returned to Tromsø.

In a decade-long career from 2005, Pedersen was capped 83 times and scored 17 goals for Norway.

== Club career ==
=== Tromsø IL ===
Pedersen was born in Vadsø Municipality in Finnmark. He had his breakthrough in the Norwegian top division club Tromsø, scoring 7 goals in the 2004 season, before he signed with Blackburn with only half a season played by August. The fee was £1.5 million, which could rise to £2.5 million on the basis of future appearances. Gamst was required to fill the gap left by Damien Duff, who had left in July 2003 to go to Chelsea.

=== Blackburn Rovers ===
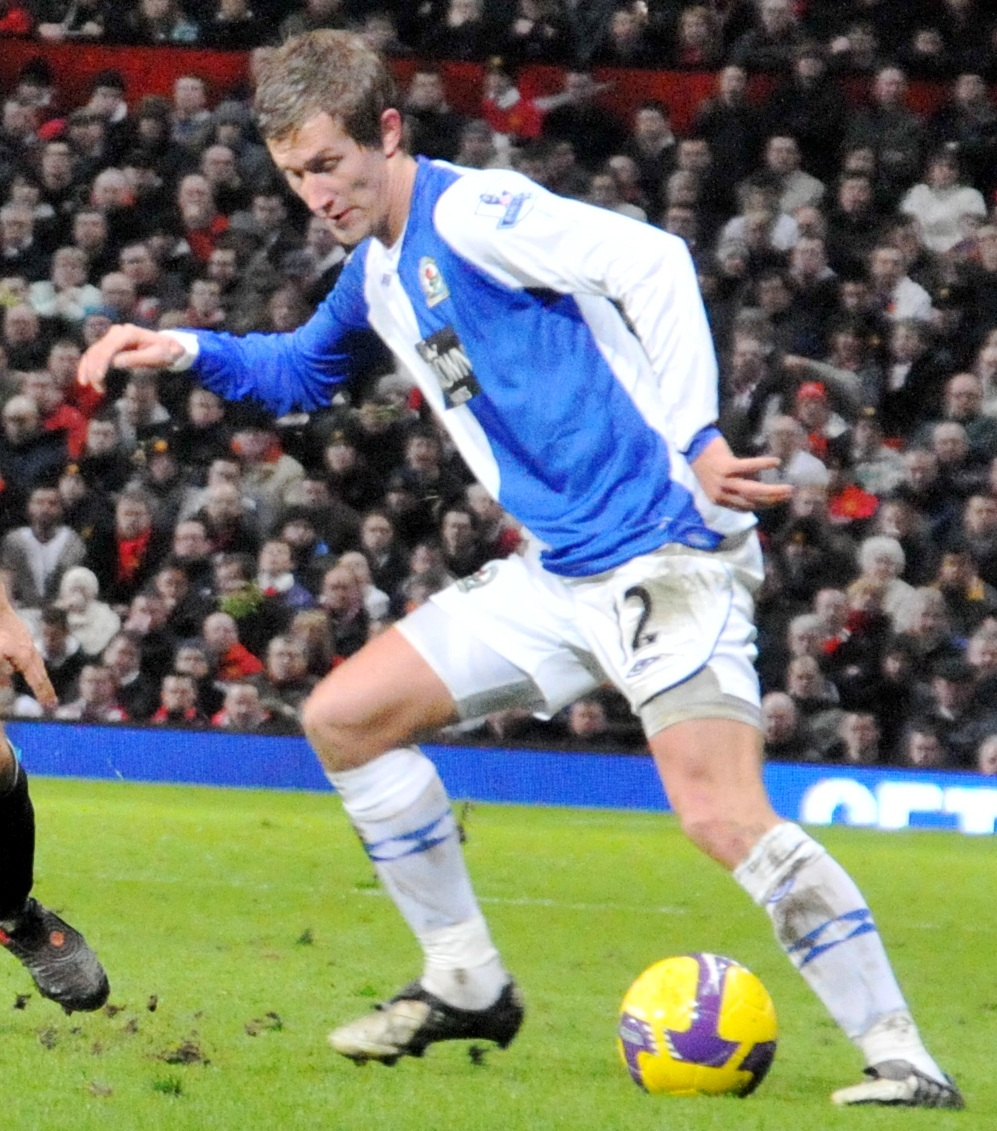
Pedersen playing for Blackburn Rovers in 2009

Pedersen was signed by Blackburn boss Graeme Souness in 2004, just in time for the 2004–05 season. The Norwegian international made his Premier League debut in a 1–1 draw against local rivals Manchester United on 28 August 2004, a match Blackburn were leading until deep into injury time. He initially struggled to make an impact in the Premier League and had lengthy period of not being selected after Souness was replaced by Mark Hughes as the Blackburn manager in September 2004. However, he started the year of 2005 by scoring against Cardiff City on his return to the side and going on to score three goals in his next three matches. In his first season in English football he featured in 27 matches and scored 8 goals in all competitions.

2005–06 saw Pedersen make the left-midfield position his own and he scored goals, such as a volley against Fulham in August 2005 which won BBC Match of the Day's Goal of the Month. The highlight of his Blackburn career came in September 2005, when he scored both goals in a 2–1 victory against Manchester United at Old Trafford.

During the 2006–07 season, Pedersen seemingly struggled for form during the early half of the league season, but returned to form in the second half of the campaign. With new management under Paul Ince in 2008, Pedersen found himself in and out of the team, but when Ince was dismissed in December 2008 and Sam Allardyce was appointed Pedersen regained a regular starting position. He was frequently used a central attacking midfielder under Allardyce. On 17 April 2010, Pedersen, was poked in the cheek and then the eye from Everton midfielder Mikel Arteta, who acted angrily after Pedersen had tackled him in a challenge. They both were booked for stopping play.

After a year of transfer negotiations, Blackburn announced that Pedersen had signed a new four-year deal at Ewood Park on 19 May 2010, which would see him stay contracted until the summer of 2014. He went on to make more than 30 appearances for them, and scored three goals in the 2009–10 Premier League campaign, in which Blackburn finished 10th, achieving 50 points and winning 10 league games at home and three away. Blackburn chairman, John Williams, who completed the formalities of the deal, added: "Sam made this, together with finding a striker, being our summer priority. He regards Morten as a key member of the Rovers squad and his future at Ewood Park is now secure." On 6 November 2010, he scored a 40-yard free-kick against Wigan Athletic, in a 2–1 victory at Ewood Park, playing the full 90 minutes. Four days later, he netted against Newcastle United at St James' Park, scoring in the third minute with his right foot following an assist from Brett Emerton and he also took a punch to the stomach by Joey Barton. This was also his 40th goal for the club in all competitions. On 21 November, in the game against Aston Villa, he scored twice at Ewood Park. First, from a free kick on the stroke of half time and the second came from a deflection off Ryan Nelsen's shot in the 66th minute. Rovers went on to win the game 2–0. At the end of the 2010–11 season, he had made 39 appearances and scored four league goals for Rovers in all competitions.

On 13 August 2011, Pedersen started against Wolverhampton Wanderers at Ewood Park in a 2–1 defeat in their opening 2011–12 Premier League fixture. On 20 August 2011, he started against Aston Villa in a 3–1 defeat at Villa Park and scored in the 52nd minute. On 24 August 2011, Pedersen captained Blackburn in their 3–1 win over Sheffield Wednesday at Ewood Park in the second round of the League Cup. Three days later, in a league game with Everton at Ewood Park, he suffered a thigh injury in a 1–0 loss.

=== Karabükspor ===
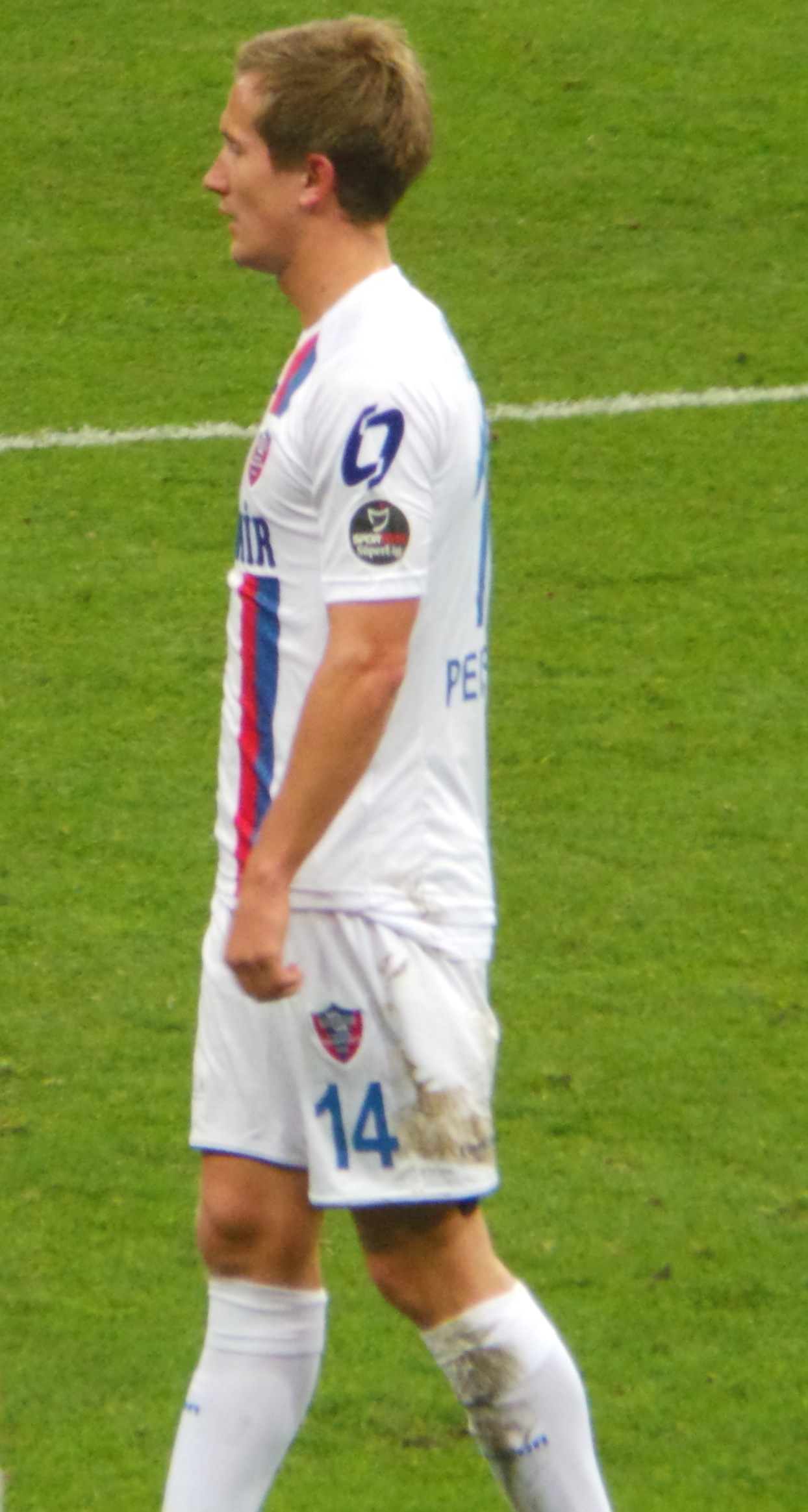
Pedersen playing for Karabükspor in 2013

Gamst Pedersen was told in August 2013 by Blackburn Rovers that he was allowed to find himself a new club. Berlingske Tidende reported that Gamst Pedersen was in talks with FC Copenhagen, but after the Norwegian Ståle Solbakken was hired as manager of the Danish side, he stated that he did not want to sign Gamst Pedersen. On 30 August 2013, he joined the Turkish side Karabükspor on a free transfer, after he had made 288 league appearances for the Ewood Park outfit.

=== Return to Norway ===
After leaving Turkish football, Gamst Pedersen returned to his native Norway to continue his football career. He signed for Rosenborg and made 28 league appearances scoring 3 goals over 2 seasons. At the end of his Rosenborg contract he remained in the top division of Norwegian football returning to his first senior club, Tromsø. Whilst representing Tromsø, Gamst Pedersen made 88 league appearances scoring 3 goals.

== International career ==
Gamst Pedersen scored two goals in his debut for Norway against Northern Ireland on 18 February 2004.

On 2 September 2006, in a Euro 2008 qualifier against Hungary, Pedersen, whose favourite player as a kid was Marco van Basten, scored a goal which was very similar to van Basten's famous goal in the final of the 1988 European Football Championship. Major newspapers Aftenposten, Dagbladet and VG all dubbed him van Gamsten as a result of the goal. After the match against Hungary, he received the coveted Golden Watch award given to him by the Football Association of Norway on the occasion of his 25th appearance for his country.

On 12 August 2009, he scored two goals for Norway in a world cup qualifier against Scotland, scoring in stoppage time in both the first and second half. On 17 November 2010, Pedersen scored in the 34th minute to equalise, playing the full 90 minutes against Republic of Ireland, at the Aviva Stadium, scoring with a superb curling free-kick into the top corner in a 2–1 win. On 4 June 2011, Pedersen started the Euro 2012 qualifier against Portugal in Lisbon, where he played the full 90 minutes in a 1–0 defeat. On 7 June 2011, he completed the full 90 minutes and was Norway's matchwinner when he scored in the 83rd minute from a rebound after he missed a penalty against Lithuania in a friendly game held in Oslo.

He played his last match so far for Norway against Greece on 15 August 2012 in a 2–3 loss, and he has been capped 74 times scoring 14 goals. Gamst Pedersen was left off of the squad for the 2014 World Cup qualifying matches against Iceland and Slovenia in September 2012, and was not called up for the national team for over a year when on 11 November 2013 he was included in Per-Mathias Høgmo squad for the friendly matches against Denmark and Scotland after Daniel Braaten called absent due to an injury.

== Personal life ==
Morten Gamst Pedersen is the son of Ernst Pedersen, a former footballer who played in the Norwegian Premier League for Bodø/Glimt and Vålerenga in the late 1970s and early 1980s.

Pedersen is of partial Sami origin. In a 2007 interview with Sami newspaper Ságat, Pedersen said he has Sami blood from both parents, though mostly from his mother's side. However, he admits his knowledge of the Sami language is very limited.

Pedersen fronted Norwegian boyband The Players, alongside fellow footballers Freddy dos Santos, Raymond Kvisvik, Kristofer Hæstad and Øyvind Svenning. Released in aid of the Soccer Against Crime campaign, their first single became a hit across Scandinavia.

== Career statistics ==
=== Club ===
Appearances and goals by club, season and competition
Season	Club	League			National cup		League cup		Europe		Total	
Season	Club	Division	Apps	Goals	Apps	Goals	Apps	Goals	Apps	Goals	Apps	Goals
Tromsø	2000	Tippeligaen	10	3	1	0	–		–		11	3
Tromsø	2001	Tippeligaen	26	5	4	0	–		–		30	5
Tromsø	2002	1. divisjon	23	18	5	3	–		–		28	21
Tromsø	2003	Tippeligaen	26	7	5	5	–		–		31	12
Tromsø	2004	Tippeligaen	18	7	3	3	–		–		21	10
Tromsø	Total		103	40	18	11	—		—		121	51
Blackburn Rovers	2004–05	Premier League	19	4	7	3	1	1	–		27	8
Blackburn Rovers	2005–06	Premier League	34	9	2	0	6	1	–		42	10
Blackburn Rovers	2006–07	Premier League	36	6	5	2	1	0	7	0	49	8
Blackburn Rovers	2007–08	Premier League	37	4	1	0	2	1	6	1	46	6
Blackburn Rovers	2008–09	Premier League	33	1	1	0	3	0	–		37	1
Blackburn Rovers	2009–10	Premier League	33	3	1	0	5	2	–		39	5
Blackburn Rovers	2010–11	Premier League	35	4	2	0	2	0	–		39	4
Blackburn Rovers	2011–12	Premier League	33	3	1	0	3	1	–		37	4
Blackburn Rovers	2012–13	Championship	28	1	5	0	0	0	–		33	1
Blackburn Rovers	Total		288	35	25	5	23	6	13	1	349	47
Karabükspor	2013–14	Süper Lig	10	0	3	0	–		–		13	0
Rosenborg	2014	Tippeligaen	24	3	2	1	–		6	1	32	5
Rosenborg	2015	Tippeligaen	4	0	1	0	–		0	0	5	0
Rosenborg	Total		28	3	3	1	—		6	1	37	5
Tromsø	2016	Tippeligaen	8	0	1	0	–		–		9	0
Tromsø	2017	Eliteserien	24	1	2	1	–		–		26	2
Tromsø	2018	Eliteserien	27	1	2	0	–		–		29	1
Tromsø	2019	Eliteserien	29	1	3	0	–		–		32	1
Tromsø	Total		88	3	8	1	—		—		96	4
Alta	2020	2. divisjon	13	7	0	0	–		–		13	7
Alta	2021	2. divisjon	25	12	3	0	–		–		28	12
Alta	Total		38	19	3	0	—		—		41	19
Åsane	2022	1. divisjon	16	0	2	0	–		–		18	0
Ranheim	2023	1. divisjon	19	2	3	2	–		–		22	4
Career total			591	102	65	20	23	6	19	2	697	130

=== International ===
Appearances and goals by national team and year
National team	Year	Apps	Goals
Norway	2004	10	4
Norway	2005	11	1
Norway	2006	6	2
Norway	2007	10	1
Norway	2008	8	0
Norway	2009	10	4
Norway	2010	9	2
Norway	2011	7	2
Norway	2012	3	0
Norway	2013	2	0
Norway	2014	7	1
Total		83	17

Scores and results list Norway's goal tally first, score column indicates score after each Gamst Pedersen goal

List of international goals scored by Morten Gamst Pedersen
No.	Date	Venue	Opponent	Score	Result	Competition
1	18 February 2004	Windsor Park, Belfast, Northern Ireland	Northern Ireland	1–0	4–1	Friendly
2	18 February 2004	Windsor Park, Belfast, Northern Ireland	Northern Ireland	2–0	4–1	Friendly
3	13 October 2004	Ullevaal Stadion, Oslo, Norway	Slovenia	2–0	3–0	2006 FIFA World Cup qualifier
4	16 November 2004	Craven Cottage, London, England	Australia	2–2	2–2	Friendly
5	3 September 2005	Arena Petrol, Celje, Slovenia	Slovenia	3–2	3–2	2006 FIFA World Cup qualifier
6	16 August 2006	Ullevaal Stadion, Oslo, Norway	Brazil	1–0	1–1	Friendly
7	2 September 2006	Ferenc Szusza Stadium, Budapest, Hungary	Hungary	3–0	4–1	UEFA Euro 2008 qualifier
8	21 October 2007	Ta' Qali Stadium, Attard, Malta	Malta	4–1	4–1	UEFA Euro 2008 qualifier
9	28 March 2009	Royal Bafokeng Stadium, Rustenburg, South Africa	South Africa	1–1	1–2	Friendly
10	1 April 2009	Ullevaal Stadion, Oslo, Norway	Finland	3–2	3–2	Friendly
11	12 August 2009	Ullevaal Stadion, Oslo, Norway	Scotland	2–0	4–0	2010 FIFA World Cup qualifier
12	12 August 2009	Ullevaal Stadion, Oslo, Norway	Scotland	4–0	4–0	2010 FIFA World Cup qualifier
13	29 May 2010	Ullevaal Stadion, Oslo, Norway	Montenegro	2–1	2–1	Friendly
14	17 November 2010	Aviva Stadium, Dublin, Ireland	Republic of Ireland	1–1	2–1	Friendly
15	7 June 2011	Ullevaal Stadion, Oslo, Norway	Lithuania	1–0	1–0	Friendly
16	11 October 2011	Ullevaal Stadion, Oslo, Norway	Cyprus	1–0	3–1	UEFA Euro 2012 qualifier
17	5 March 2014	Eden Arena, Prague	Czech Republic	2–2	2–2	Friendly

== Honours ==
Tromsø

- 1. divisjon: 2002

Rosenborg

- Tippeligaen: 2015
- Norwegian Football Cup: 2015

Individual

- Eliteserien top assist provider: 2017
