= Øyvind Svenning =

Norwegian footballer (born 1980)

Personal information
- Date of birth: 29 January 1980 (age 46)
- Place of birth: Trondheim, Norway
- Height: 1.92 m (6 ft 4 in)
- Position: Defender

Youth career
- Åfjord

Senior career*
| Years | Team | Apps | (Gls) |
| –1999 | Byåsen | | |
| 2000 | Rosenborg | 2 | (0) |
| 2001 | Moss | 19 | (1) |
| 2002–2005 | GIF Sundsvall | 62 | (8) |
| 2005–2007 | Viking | 32 | (0) |
| 2007–2010 | Randaberg | | |
| 2011–2013 | Sandved | 15 | (4) |
- * Club domestic league appearances and goals

Øyvind Svenning (born 29 January 1980) is a Norwegian former footballer who played as a defender. He has played for Rosenborg, Moss and Viking in Eliteserien and GIF Sundsvall in Allsvenskan.

== Career ==
Svenning made his Eliteserien debut for Rosenborg in the 2000 season. In 2001, he played for Moss, before joining Swedish side GIF Sundsvall in 2002. On 29 June 2005, Svenning joined Viking on a three-year contract. In July 2006, he launched a music single; This Is For Real, together with four other professional Norwegian footballers — Morten Gamst Pedersen, Freddy dos Santos, Raymond Kvisvik, and Kristofer Hæstad. They called their band The Players. In July 2007, he joined Norwegian Third Division side Randaberg alongside Bjarte Lunde Aarsheim. He later played for Sandved, where he ended his career. (Note: Øyvind Svenning at the Norwegian Football Federation (in Norwegian))
