= Lyngdal IL =

Norwegian sports club

- Full name: Lyngdal Idrettslag
- Founded: 1934
- Ground: Lyngdal Stadion; Lyngdal
- Manager: Jan Sanden
- League: Fifth Division (6th tier)
- 2025: Fifth Division Agder, 2nd
Home colours

Lyngdal Idrettslag is a local sports club from the town of Lyngdal in Lyngdal Municipality in Agder county, Norway.

Lyngdal Idrettslag takes part in football, handball, volleyball, basketball, orienteering, athletics, and other sports.

Lyngdal's men's football team in playing in the Fifth Division, the sixth tier of Norwegian football, after being relegated from the Fourth Division in 2024. Former players include Espen Hægeland, Raymond Hofstædter, Stefan Strandberg, Jakob Ertzeid Toft, Zlatko Tripić, Mathias Rasmussen and Julian Ryerson.

It is the youth club of Ingvild Stensland, former captain of the Norway women's national football team.

Lyngdal's women's handball team plays in the fourth division.
