= Raymond Hofstædter =

Norwegian footballer (born 1979)

Raymond Hofstædter (born 24 December 1979) is a Norwegian football striker.

A journeyman footballer, Hofstædter most notably played for Start in the Norwegian Premier League. Before this he played in Lyngdal IL and FK Mandalskameratene. He later played for Eik-Tønsberg, FK Arendal, FK Ørn-Horten, Larvik Fotball, Randesund IL, Drøbak/Frogn IL, FK Vigør and Vindbjart FK. Ahead of the 2009 season he joined Flekkerøy IL. After a brief spell at Lyngdal in 2013, he returned to Mandalskameratene in July 2013. Before he became head coach of the Fourth Division club Flekkefjord FK ahead of the 2014 season. In 2015 he played for Lyngdal and Mandalskameratene, later featuring for lowly Marnardal.

His past includes a prison sentence; for violence in 1999. In 2000 he was capped once for Norway u-21.
