= Morten Hæstad =

Norwegian footballer (born 1987)

Personal information
- Full name: Morten Kruger Hæstad
- Date of birth: 11 March 1987 (age 39)
- Place of birth: Kristiansand, Norway
- Height: 1.80 m (5 ft 11 in)
- Position: Midfielder

Team information
- Current team: Hønefoss
- Number: 26

Senior career*
| Years | Team | Apps | (Gls) |
| 2004–2011 | IK Start | 69 | (5) |
| 2005 | → Tønsberg (loan) | 10 | (0) |
| 2006 | → Haugesund (loan) | 25 | (0) |
| 2011–2013 | Kongsvinger | 65 | (3) |
| 2014–2015 | Hønefoss | 50 | (5) |

International career
| 2003 | Norway u-17 | 8 | (2) |
| 2004 | Norway u-18 | 8 | (3) |
| 2004–2005 | Norway u-19 | 10 | (2) |
| 2005–2006 | Norway u-20 | 12 | (0) |
| 2006–2008 | Norway u-21 | 9 | (0) |
- * Club domestic league appearances and goals as of 2 June 2019

Morten Hæstad (born 11 March 1987) is a retired Norwegian footballer. He is the younger brother of Kristofer Hæstad.

As a youth player Hæstad played for Randesund. He made his senior debut for IK Start and spent the 2006 season on loan to FK Haugesund.

He has been capped for Norway from under-17 level up to the Norwegian national under-21 team.

== Career statistics ==
| Club | Season | Division | League | | Cup | | Total | |
| Club | Season | Division | Apps | Goals | Apps | Goals | Apps | Goals |
|---|---|---|---|---|---|---|---|---|
| 2004 | Start | 1. divisjon | 1 | 0 | 0 | 0 | 1 | 0 |
| 2005 | Start | Tippeligaen | 0 | 0 | 1 | 0 | 1 | 0 |
| 2005 | Tønsberg | 1. divisjon | 10 | 0 | 0 | 0 | 10 | 0 |
| 2006 | Haugesund | 1. divisjon | 25 | 0 | 1 | 0 | 26 | 0 |
| 2007 | Start | Tippeligaen | 14 | 2 | 3 | 0 | 17 | 2 |
| 2008 | Start | 1. divisjon | 28 | 3 | 1 | 0 | 29 | 3 |
| 2009 | Start | Tippeligaen | 16 | 0 | 3 | 0 | 19 | 0 |
| 2010 | Start | Tippeligaen | 8 | 0 | 1 | 0 | 9 | 0 |
| 2011 | Start | Tippeligaen | 3 | 0 | 1 | 0 | 4 | 0 |
| 2011 | Kongsvinger | 1. divisjon | 11 | 1 | 0 | 0 | 11 | 1 |
| 2012 | Kongsvinger | 1. divisjon | 27 | 2 | 3 | 0 | 30 | 2 |
| 2013 | Kongsvinger | 1. divisjon | 27 | 0 | 1 | 0 | 28 | 0 |
| 2014 | Hønefoss | 1. divisjon | 24 | 3 | 2 | 1 | 26 | 4 |
| 2015 | Hønefoss | 1. divisjon | 26 | 2 | 3 | 0 | 29 | 2 |
