= Madiou Konate =

Senegalese footballer

Personal information
- Full name: Madiou Konate
- Date of birth: 12 January 1982 (age 44)
- Place of birth: Dakar, Senegal
- Height: 1.73 m (5 ft 8 in)
- Position: Striker

Youth career
- 1998–2000: AS Douanes

Senior career*
Years	Team	Apps	(Gls)
2000–2002	Al-Ahli	44	(15)
2002–2004	Al-Mabarrah	56	(18)
2004–2005	Al Ittihad	37	(27)
2005–2007	Molde FK	30	(6)
2008	Hønefoss BK	19	(10)
2008–2009	Ankaraspor	18	(2)
2009–2010	Ankaragücü	8	(0)
2010	Hønefoss BK	19	(1)
2011	Al-Ittihad	6	(3)
2011–2013	Al Yarmouk	53	(31)
2014–2017	Strømmen	35	(10)
- * Club domestic league appearances and goals as of 17 November 2018

Madiou Konate (born 12 January 1982 in Dakar) is a former Senegalese football striker.

== Career ==
=== Early career ===
Konate started his career in his native Senegal at local side AS Douanes before being spotted by scouts from Al-Ahly. He joined the Al-Mabarrahn side, scoring 15 times in 44 games for his new club, before moving to outfit Al-Ittihad. In 2005, he joined Molde FK, where he is best remembered for being awarded a yellow card just ten seconds into his debut against Lillestrøm SK, and for scoring in the 4–2 cup final win the same year against the same club. In 2008, he joined Hønefoss BK.

=== Move to Turkey ===
On 5 July 2008 Konate signed a five-year-contract with Turkey Ankaraspor. The transfer fee was estimated to be around €400,000. Madiou quickly became a fan favourite, and established himself as a talented goal scorer.

==== Position ====
His favourite position is second striker although he has played as winger or as an attacking midfielder. He is well known for his pace.

== Career statistics ==
As of match played 5 November 2017

Club	Season	Division	League		Cup		Europe		Other (Note: Includes the Eliteserien play-offs)		Total	
Club	Season	Division	Apps	Goals	Apps	Goals	Apps	Goals	Apps	Goals	Apps	Goals
Molde	2005	Tippeligaen	8	2	1	1	—		2	2	11	5
Molde	2006	Tippeligaen	19	4	2	6	4 (Note: Appearances in the UEFA Cup)	0	—		21	10
Molde	2007	Adeccoligaen	3	0	0	0	—		—		3	0
Molde	Total		30	6	3	7	4	0	2	2	39	15
Hønefoss	2008	Adeccoligaen	19	10	0	0	—		—		19	10
Ankaraspor	2008–09	Süper Lig	18	2	6	3	—		—		24	5
Ankaragücü	2009–10	Süper Lig	8	0	0	0	—		—		8	0
Hønefoss	2010	Tippeligaen	19	1	3	2	—		3	2	25	5
Al-Ittihad	2010–11	Syrian Premier League	6	3	0	0	—		—		6	3
Strømmen	2014	1. divisjon	11	8	0	0	—		—		11	8
Strømmen	2015	OBOS-ligaen	15	1	4	4	—		—		19	5
Strømmen	2016	OBOS-ligaen	8	1	2	1	—		—		10	2
Strømmen	2017	OBOS-ligaen	1	0	0	0	—		—		1	0
Strømmen	Total		35	10	6	5	—		—		41	15
Career Total			135	32	18	17	4	0	5	4	162	53
