= Olav Zanetti =

Norwegian footballer (born 1976)

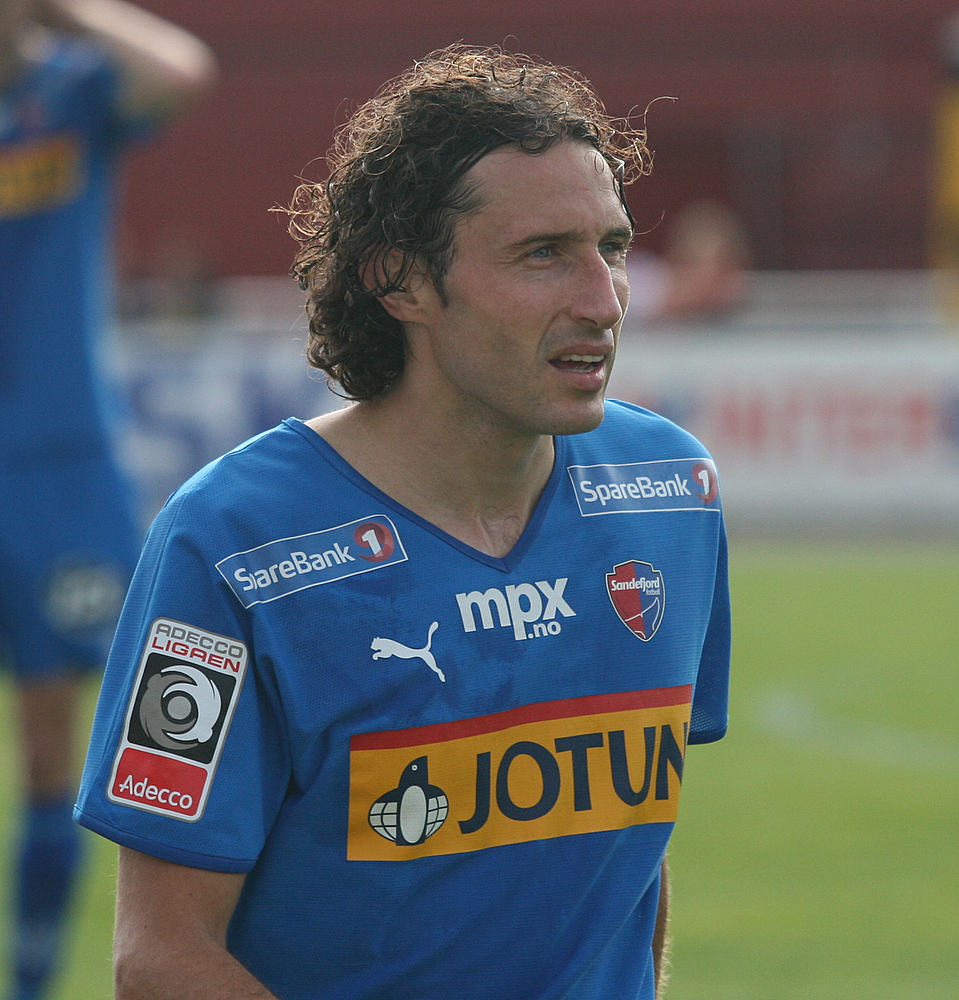
- Olav Zanetti

Personal information
- Date of birth: 29 April 1976 (age 50)
- Position: Defender

Youth career
- –1993: Skjetten

Senior career*
Years	Team	Apps	(Gls)
1994–1998	Skjetten		
1999–2001	Lillestrøm	12	(0)
2002–2005	Hønefoss	93	(0)
2006–2010	Sandefjord	87	(2)
2011	Fram	3	(0)
2012–2013	Stjørdals-Blink	23	(0)
- * Club domestic league appearances and goals

Olav Zanetti (born 29 April 1976) is a retired Norwegian football defender.

He went from Skjetten SK's junior team to its senior team in 1994. He later played professionally for three seasons in Lillestrøm SK, four in Hønefoss BK and five in Sandefjord. Here he became runner-up in the 2006 Norwegian Football Cup Final. He finished his career in IF Fram Larvik and IL Stjørdals-Blink.
