= The Players (Norwegian band) =

Norwegian musical group

- Origin: Norway
- Genres: Pop
- Years active: 2006–2009
- Label: Universal
- Members: Kristofer Hæstad; Raymond Kvisvik; Morten Gamst Pedersen; Freddy dos Santos; Øyvind Svenning

The Players is a Norwegian musical project consisting of five professional footballers: Freddy dos Santos, Morten Gamst Pedersen, Raymond Kvisvik, Kristofer Hæstad and Øyvind Svenning.

They released the single "This Is For Real" with proceeds from sale of the single going to the Red Cross charity project called Soccer Against Crime. The song spent 4 weeks on the Norwegian Singles Chart in 2006, peaking at number 11.
