= Jan Kjell Larsen =

Norwegian footballer (born 1983)

Personal information
- Date of birth: 24 June 1983 (age 43)
- Place of birth: Haugesund, Norway
- Position: Goalkeeper

Youth career
- Kopervik IL

Senior career*
| Years | Team | Apps | (Gls) |
| 2002–2005 | FK Haugesund | 65 | (0) |
| 2006–2010 | Molde FK | 93 | (0) |
| 2011–2012 | Stabæk | 33 | (0) |

International career^{‡}
| 2003–2005 | Norway U21 | 17 | (0) |
- * Club domestic league appearances and goals as of 3 September 2012 ‡ National team caps and goals as of 20 March 2008

Jan Kjell Larsen (born 24 June 1983) is a Norwegian former football goalkeeper.

== Career statistics ==
| Season | Club | Division | League | | Cup | | Total | |
| Season | Club | Division | Apps | Goals | Apps | Goals | Apps | Goals |
|---|---|---|---|---|---|---|---|---|
| 2001 | Haugesund | Adeccoligaen | 0 | 0 | 0 | 0 | 0 | 0 |
| 2002 | Haugesund | Adeccoligaen | 8 | 0 | 0 | 0 | 8 | 0 |
| 2003 | Haugesund | Adeccoligaen | 28 | 0 | 5 | 0 | 33 | 0 |
| 2004 | Haugesund | Adeccoligaen | 29 | 0 | 1 | 0 | 30 | 0 |
| 2005 | Haugesund | Adeccoligaen | 0 | 0 | 0 | 0 | 0 | 0 |
| 2006 | Molde | Tippeligaen | 25 | 0 | 2 | 0 | 27 | 0 |
| 2007 | Molde | Adeccoligaen | 24 | 0 | 0 | 0 | 24 | 0 |
| 2008 | Molde | Tippeligaen | 26 | 0 | 4 | 0 | 30 | 0 |
| 2009 | Molde | Tippeligaen | 11 | 0 | 2 | 0 | 13 | 0 |
| 2010 | Molde | Tippeligaen | 7 | 0 | 2 | 0 | 9 | 0 |
| 2011 | Stabæk | Tippeligaen | 20 | 0 | 2 | 0 | 22 | 0 |
| 2012 | Stabæk | Tippeligaen | 13 | 0 | 1 | 0 | 14 | 0 |
| Career Total | | | 191 | 0 | 19 | 0 | 210 | 0 |
