= Sandro Grande =

Canadian soccer player (born 1977)

Personal information
- Date of birth: September 29, 1977 (age 49)
- Place of birth: Montreal, Quebec, Canada
- Height: 5 ft 8 in (1.73 m)
- Position: Midfielder

Senior career*
Years	Team	Apps	(Gls)
1997–1998	Frenter Larino	6	(1)
1998–1999	Isernia	26	(12)
1999–2000	Potenza	22	(2)
2000–2001	Frosinone	27	(1)
2001–2003	Brescia	0	(0)
2001–2002	→ Catanzaro (loan)	8	(1)
2002	→ Frosinone (loan)	7	(0)
2002–2003	→ Potenza (loan)	18	(0)
2003–2004	Albalonga	21	(0)
2004–2005	Montreal Impact	31	(6)
2005	Viking	6	(0)
2006–2007	Molde	14	(0)
2008–2009	Montreal Impact	17	(1)
2010–2011	FK Sūduva	24	(1)
2012	FC St-Léonard	13	(3)
2013	Les Étoiles de l'Est	2	(0)

International career^{‡}
2004–2006	Canada	12	(1)

Managerial career
- 2019: CS Monteuil
- * Club domestic league appearances and goals as of 21 October 2009 ‡ National team caps and goals as of 23 December 2009

Sandro Grande (born September 29, 1977) is a Canadian soccer player.

== Club career ==
=== Italy ===
Grande was born on September 29, 1977, in Montreal, beginning his career in Italy, He played four years with U.S.Frenter Larino and Potenza and Frosinone in the late 1990s and early 2000s.

Grande became the first Quebec-born footballer to sign with a Serie A club, signing a three-year deal with Brescia in 2001. After appearing in just one match for the first team, in the Intertoto Cup in July 2001, Grande was loaned back to Serie C side Frosinone, and then later played in Serie D with U.S.Frenter Larino and Potenza and Albalonga.

=== Canada/Scandinavia ===
In July 2005, he moved to Norway to play for Viking in the Norwegian Premier League, before moving on to Molde in March 2006. After his contract with Molde expired in 2007, the club chose not to renew it. After fully recovering from surgery on both knees, he returned to Montreal Impact. Upon his return Grande scored one goal in six regular season games, which he scored on September 5 against the Minnesota Thunder. He helped the Impact qualify for the CONCACAF Champions League quarter finals, playing six games in the tournament.

=== Lithuania ===
On March 16, 2010, Sandro Grande signed a contract with Lithuanian club FK Suduva.

== International career ==
Grande made his debut for the Canada national team in a September 2004 World Cup qualification match against Costa Rica and has earned a total of 12 caps, scoring 1 goal. He has represented Canada in 4 FIFA World Cup qualification matches and was a member of Canada's squad at the 2005 CONCACAF Gold Cup.

=== International goals ===
Scores and results list Canada's goal tally first.

#	Date	Venue	Opponent	Score	Result	Competition
1	3 September 2005	Estadio El Sardinero, Santander, Spain	Spain	1–2	1–2	Friendly match

== Coaching career ==
=== CS Monteuil ===
On September 20, 2018, CS Monteuil announced Grande as the new team coach for the 2019 PLSQ season, although he departed before the end of the season.

=== CF Montréal U23 ===
Grande was hired on January 9, 2023 as the head coach of CF Montréal U23, the reserve side of MLS club CF Montréal. He was released from the position a day after due to backlash over comments Grande made on Twitter in 2012, following the attempted assassination of Quebec premier Pauline Marois.
