= Raymond Kvisvik =

Norwegian footballer (born 1974)

Personal information
- Date of birth: 8 November 1974 (age 51)
- Place of birth: Sarpsborg, Norway
- Height: 1.79 m (5 ft 10 1/2 in)
- Position: Winger

Youth career
- Greåker

Senior career*
Years	Team	Apps	(Gls)
1991–1994	Greåker	63	(16)
1995–1996	Sarpsborg FK	30	(14)
1997–1998	Moss	35	(9)
1998–2002	Brann	92	(29)
2002–2003	Austria Wien	21	(2)
2003–2005	Brann	49	(22)
2005–2009	Fredrikstad	101	(12)
2010–2011	Kvik Halden	34	(6)
Total		425	(110)

International career
2000–2006	Norway	11	(2)
- * Club domestic league appearances and goals

Raymond Kvisvik (born 8 November 1974) is a Norwegian former professional footballer who played as a winger. He is most noted for his spells at Brann, but he did also play for Moss, Austria Wien and Fredrikstad. Kvisvik won the Norwegian Cup with Brann in 2004 and with Fredrikstad in 2006. He was capped eleven times for Norway scoring two goals.

== Club career ==
Hailing from Greåker outside Sarpsborg, Kvisvik started his professional career at Moss in 1997, before he transferred to Brann in June 1998. In his Brann-debut, Kvisvik scored the equalizing goal in the 1–1 draw against Lillestrøm and he was given much of the honor when Brann avoided relegation in the 1998 season. He was also a part of the team that lost the Final of the 1999 Norwegian Cup and finished second in the 2000 Tippeligaen. Kvisvik and his teammate at Brann, Thorstein Helstad, joined Austria Wien for a combined fee of 16 million NOK in July 2002. Kvisvik returned to Brann after a season in Austria, and was once again credited for saving Brann from relegation during the 2003 season. After winning the 2004 Norwegian Cup with Brann, Kvisvik joined Fredrikstad in July 2005. When Fredrikstad won 3–0 in the 2006 Norwegian Cup Final against Sandefjord, Kvisvik assisted all of Fredrikstad's goals.

After Kvisvik left Fredrikstad in 2009, Kvisvik has continued to play football at lower levels, for Kvik Halden in the 2. divisjon, Sarpsborg FK and Greåker in the 5. Divisjon.

== International career ==
Kvisvik was included in a Norway national team for the first time in January 2000. He subsequently made his debut against Denmark when he played seven minutes as a substitute. After scoring goals in the friendly matches against Bahrain and Kuwait in January 2005, Kvisvik became a regular in Åge Hareide's national team.

== Personal life ==
In July 2006, Kvisvik launched a single, This Is For Real, together with four other professional Norwegian footballers – Morten Gamst Pedersen, Freddy dos Santos, Kristofer Hæstad, and Øyvind Svenning. They call their band The Players.

Kvisvik has also played for the Norway national floorball team (four games), and has won the Norwegian championships four times with Greåker Bulldogs.

Raymond Kvisvik is one of the few footballers in the world, together with the likes of David Beckham and Cristiano Ronaldo, who has his own brand of perfume. It is called "Super-Ray", and it is now out of production. Kvisvik had the idea for the perfume together with a mate from his hometown Greåker, after they had drunk some pints at the local pub called Olavs pub.

In November 2006, Kvisvik was included in the Norway team for the 2006 European Futsal Championship. Norway was eliminated in the quarter-final against Belgium, and Kvisvik scored two of the goals in the 3–6 defeat.

== Honours ==
=== Club ===
- Norwegian Cup: 2004, 2006
- Austrian Bundesliga: 2002–03
- Austrian Cup: 2002–03
- Austrian Supercup: 2002–03

==== Individual ====
- SK Brann player of the year: 2001, 2003
