= Marel Baldvinsson =

Icelandic footballer

Personal information
- Full name: Marel Jóhann Baldvinsson
- Date of birth: 18 December 1980 (age 45)
- Place of birth: Kópavogur, Iceland
- Height: 1.90 m (6 ft 3 in)
- Position: Striker

Youth career
- 1996: Breiðablik

Senior career*
Years	Team	Apps	(Gls)
1997–2000	Breiðablik	32	(7)
2000–2002	Stabæk	48	(10)
2002–2006	Lokeren	56	(6)
2006	Breiðablik	13	(11)
2006–2007	Molde	24	(7)
2008	Breiðablik	19	(6)
2009	Valur	19	(3)
2010	Stjarnan	7	(0)

International career^{‡}
1996	Iceland U17	4	(0)
1998	Iceland U19	7	(0)
1999–2001	Iceland U21	5	(1)
2001–2008	Iceland	17	(0)
- * Club domestic league appearances and goals as of 4 November 2010 ‡ National team caps and goals as of 2 June 2009

Marel Jóhann Baldvinsson (born 18 December 1980) is an Icelandic football forward who last played for Stjarnan.

== Club career ==
He started his career in Breiðablik, but moved to Norway early in his career. In October 1997, Marel went on trial with Manchester United. After a fruitless trial with Rosenborg BK, he signed with Stabæk with a deal worth 600,000 Euro. In January 2003 he was sold to the Belgian club Lokeren for just half of what Stabæk paid for him, 300,000 Euro, but with a clause giving 25% of the total transition in a later resale.

In 2006, he was forced to cut short his career as a professional footballer due to injury. He rejoined Breiðablik in his native Iceland. After many impressive displays in the 2006 season, he was recalled into the Icelandic national team to face Spain in August 2006. A few days later he returned to professional football when he signed for Norwegian club Molde, in a deal worth 1,5 million Euro.

In 2007, after two seasons at Molde, Marel had his contract terminated. On 30 December 2007 he signed a three-year contract with Breiðablik, starting his third stint at the club. He scored six goals in 19 games for the club and following a dispute with the club's management, reportedly revolving around wages, he left the club on 22 April 2009 and was signed by Valur. He started his career at Valur well, scoring three goals in his first five games, including a late equalizer against Grindavík and a winning goal against local rivals Fram. On 24 March, it was declared that he would join Stjarnan and play with them the following season. He played seven games in the 2010 season but hasn't played football since.

== International career ==
Marel made his debut for Iceland in an August 2001 friendly match against Poland, coming on as a substitute for Tryggvi Guðmundsson. He played 17 senior international games in total, as well as 16 times at youth level.
