= Yherland McDonald =

Costa Rican footballer (born 1986)

Personal information
- Full name: Yherland Jazheel McDonald Porras
- Date of birth: 6 September 1986 (age 40)
- Place of birth: Costa Rica
- Positions: Midfielder; winger; forward

Senior career*
Years	Team	Apps	(Gls)
-2006	Fredrikstad FK	13	(1)
2007	Colorado Rapids	0	(0)
2007/2008	A.D. Municipal Liberia		
2008-2009	A.D. Carmelita		(1)
2010/2011	Brujas F.C.	7	(1)
2010/2011	C.D. Barrio México	3	(0)
2011-2012	A.D. Ramonense		
- * Club domestic league appearances and goals

Yherland McDonald (born 6 September 1986) is a Costa Rican retired footballer.
