= Espen Hægeland =

Norwegian footballer (born 1981)

Personal information
- Full name: Espen Hægeland
- Date of birth: 27 September 1981 (age 45)
- Place of birth: Lyngdal Municipality, Norway
- Height: 1.79 m (5 ft 10 1/2 in)
- Position: Winger

Team information
- Current team: Lyngdal

Senior career*
Years	Team	Apps	(Gls)
–2004	Lyngdal		
2005–2006	Bryne	38	(11)
2006	→ Mandalskameratene (loan)		
2007	Mandalskameratene	30	(11)
2008	Randaberg		
2008–2009	Sandnes Ulf		
2011	Mandalskameratene		
2012–	Lyngdal		

Managerial career
- 2010: Hana
- * Club domestic league appearances and goals as of 27 March 2013

Espen Hægeland (born 27 September 1981) is a Norwegian footballer who played as a winger for Bryne, Mandalskameratene and Sandnes Ulf in the Norwegian First Division. He has later been player-coach at Hana and assistant player-coach at Mandalskameratene and Lyngdal.

== Career ==
Hægeland was born in Lyngdal Municipality, and started his career in the local club Lyngdal IL. He scored 25 goals in 22 matches for Lyngdal in the Third Division in the 2004 season and was invited on a trial with Mandalskameratene ahead of the 2005 season, but was not offered a contract with the club and joined Bryne instead. Hægeland, who worked as a carpenter while playing for Bryne, scored nine goals in his first eight matches in the First Division including two goals in the 5–1 victory against Skeid on 6 June 2005 and a hat-trick when Bryne won 4–0 against Løv-Ham two weeks later. After 12 matches of the season, Bryne were leading the First Division and Hægeland only had Daniel Nannskog ahead of him on the goal-scoring list. The Bryne-team struggled with their offensive play during the second half of the season, and after Tommy Bergersen and André Danielsen was transferred to Bryne during the summer, Hægeland lost his place in the first-team. He scored 11 goals in the 2005 season, and finished 10th in the top goalscorer list.

Hægeland was sent on loan to Mandalskameratene half-way through the 2006 season, and joined the club permanently on a three-year contract ahead of the 2007 season. He was one of Mandalskameratene's best players in 2007, and scored 11 goals in 30 matches when the team was relegated from the First Division. After the season, he was wanted by seven clubs, and stated that he wanted to play for a club in Rogaland as he was building a house in Bryne. Hægeland played for Randaberg during the first half of the 2008 season, before he transferred to Sandnes Ulf in July 2008. He scored five goals in 14 matches for Sandnes Ulf in the First Division in 2008. After the 2009 season he joined the Third Division side Hana IL as a player-coach, but left the club after only one season and returned to Mandalskameratene where he became playing assistant coach. Following Peer Danefeld's resignation as head coach of Mandalskameratene, Hægeland was temporarily working as head coach during the pre-season in 2011, but stated that he didn't want that position permanently. After rejoining Lyngdal, he scored more than 50 goals for the team in the Fourth Division during the 2012 season. Ahead of the 2013 season he became playing assistant coach of Lyngdal.
