= Freddy dos Santos =

Norwegian footballer (born 1976)

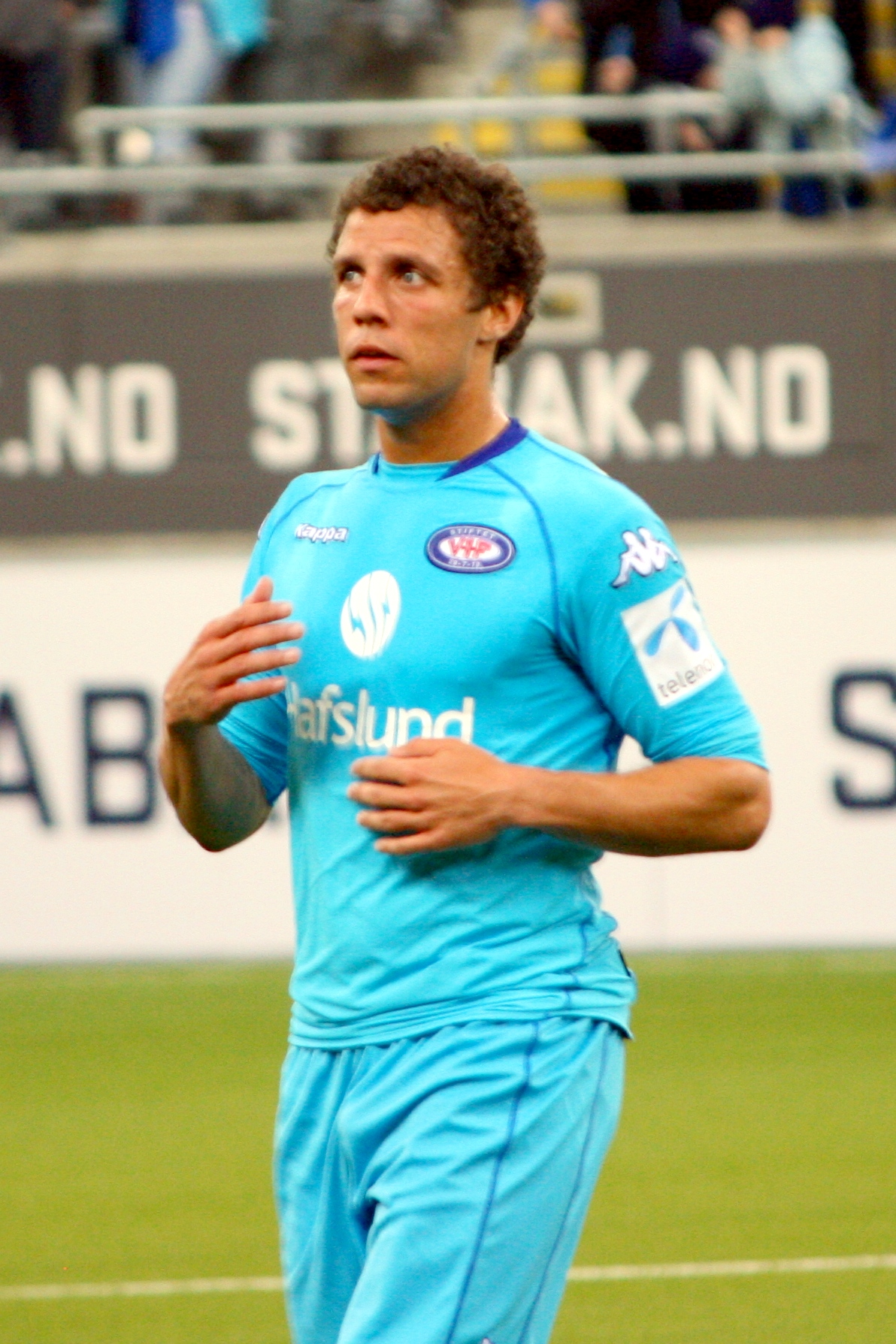

Personal information
- Full name: Freddy dos Santos
- Date of birth: 2 October 1976 (age 50)
- Place of birth: Oslo, Norway
- Height: 1.80 m (5 ft 11 in)
- Positions: Defender; midfielder

Youth career
- Skeid

Senior career*
Years	Team	Apps	(Gls)
1994–1997	Skeid	50	(3)
1998–2000	Molde	64	(0)
2001–2011	Vålerenga	246	(38)

International career
1993	Norway G16	2	(0)
1994	Norway G17	6	(1)
1995	Norway G18	9	(2)
1996–1997	Norway U21	8	(1)
- * Club domestic league appearances and goals as of 13:54, 6 May 2009 (UTC)

Freddy dos Santos (born 2 October 1976) is a Norwegian former footballer who played most of his career for Vålerenga in the Norwegian Premier League.

Dos Santos has played as a defender, midfield and forward. His former clubs are Skeid and Molde.

== Club career ==
=== Skeid ===
He started his career at Skeid. During the last two seasons with them he played in the Norwegian top division.

=== Molde ===
In 1998 season, he moved to Molde after Skeid got relegated from the top flight. In his first two seasons he helped them in achieving a back-to-back silver medal in the league, also playing in the group stages of the 1999–2000 Champions League.

=== Vålerenga ===
He moved back to Oslo in 2001 and joined Vålerenga, who had just been relegated from the Norwegian Premier League. He helped them secure direct promotion. He started in both finals in which Vålerenga won the Norwegian Football Cup, in 2002 and 2008. In 2005, he won the Norwegian Premier League with Vålerenga.

He has played over 300 games for Vålerenga, more than any other player in the history of the club.

== International career ==
He has played several games at various youth levels for Norway, but never played in the senior side. He could potentially feature for Cape Verde as his father is born there.

== Personal life ==
Cape Verde is his father's country of origin.

In July 2006, dos Santos launched a single, This Is For Real, together with four other professional Norwegian footballers – Morten Gamst Pedersen, Raymond Kvisvik, Kristofer Hæstad and Øyvind Svenning. They called their band The Players.

In 2012, dos Santos was announced as the host of the Norwegian version of The Amazing Race.

== Club statistics ==
Correct as of match played 31 October 2010

Club performance			League		Cup		Continental		Total	
Season	Club	League	Apps	Goals	Apps	Goals	Apps	Goals	Apps	Goals
Norway			League		Norwegian Cup		Europe		Total	
1994	Skeid	1. divisjon	?	?	?	?	0	0	?	?
1995	Skeid	1. divisjon	?	?	?	?	0	0	?	?
1996	Skeid	Tippeligaen	?	?	?	?	0	0	?	?
1997	Skeid	Tippeligaen	?	?	?	?	0	0	?	?
1998	Molde	Tippeligaen	22	0	2	0	2	0	26	0
1999	Molde	Tippeligaen	20	0	3	0	9	0	32	0
2000	Molde	Tippeligaen	21	0	2	0	2	0	25	0
2001	Vålerenga	1. divisjon	22	7	1	0	0	0	23	7
2002	Vålerenga	Tippeligaen	21	3	6	3	0	0	27	6
2003	Vålerenga	Tippeligaen	27	10	2	0	6	0	35	10
2004	Vålerenga	Tippeligaen	26	8	3	3	0	0	29	11
2005	Vålerenga	Tippeligaen	20	1	5	1	4	1	29	3
2006	Vålerenga	Tippeligaen	26	4	3	4	2	0	31	8
2007	Vålerenga	Tippeligaen	25	0	3	1	4	2	32	3
2008	Vålerenga	Tippeligaen	23	1	7	1	0	0	30	2
2009	Vålerenga	Tippeligaen	9	1	2	0	0	0	11	1
2010	Vålerenga	Tippeligaen	24	2	1	1	0	0	25	3
2011	Vålerenga	Tippeligaen	23	1	0	0	0	0	23	1
Total	Norway		?	?	?	?	29	3	?	?

- 2003: 2 relegation games (0 goals) included in league games
- 2009: 1 Super Final (0 goals) added to Cup games

== Honours ==
Vålerenga

- Tippeligaen: 2005
- Norwegian Football Cup: 2002, 2008
