= Mikael Andersson (footballer, born 1978) =

Swedish footballer

Personal information
- Full name: Mikael Andersson
- Date of birth: August 21, 1978 (age 48)
- Place of birth: Malmö, Sweden
- Height: 1.87 m (6 ft 1 1/2 in)
- Positions: Striker; midfielder

Youth career
- Husie IF

Senior career*
| Years | Team | Apps | (Gls) |
| 1996–1997 | Malmö FF | | |
| 1998–2005 | Hammarby IF | 175 | (27) |
| 2006–2007 | Sandefjord Fotball | | |
| 2008 | Enköpings SK | 25 | (3) |
- * Club domestic league appearances and goals

Mikael "Mål-Micke" Andersson (born August 21, 1978) is a Swedish former footballer who played as a midfielder.

He started to play football in Husie IF. His senior career started in Malmö FF, then seven years in Hammarby IF. He played two years in Norway with Sandefjord Fotball. 2008 he returned to Sweden and Enköpings SK. After one season in Enköpings SK he retired from football.

== Honours ==
Hammarby IF

- Allsvenskan: 2001
