= John Anders Bjørkøy =

Norwegian footballer (born 1979)

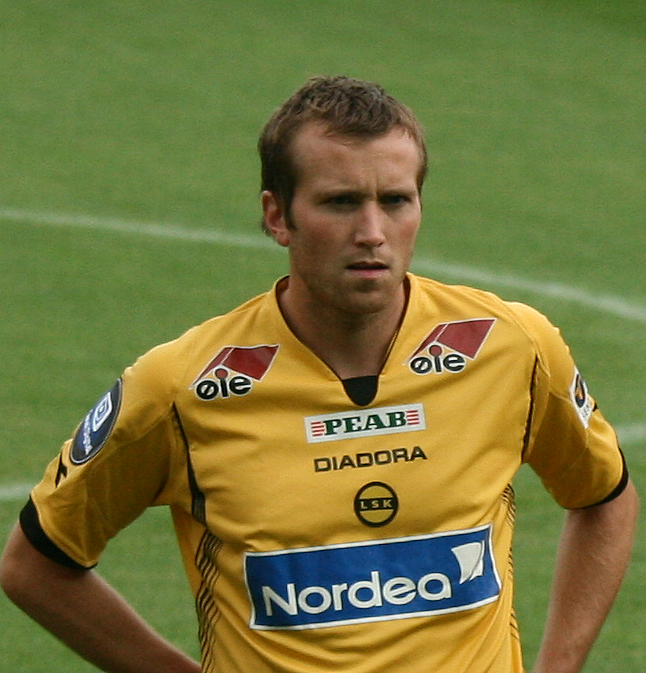

Personal information
- Date of birth: 8 January 1979 (age 47)
- Place of birth: Oslo, Norway
- Height: 1.80 m (5 ft 11 in)
- Position: Midfielder

Youth career
- Gjelleråsen

Senior career*
Years	Team	Apps	(Gls)
1998–1999	Skjetten	24	(0)
2000–2003	Raufoss	106	(23)
2004–2005	Hønefoss	40	(4)
2005–2007	Fredrikstad	63	(15)
2008–2009	Lillestrøm	39	(1)
2009	Odd Grenland	4	(0)

International career^{‡}
2007	Norway	4	(0)
- * Club domestic league appearances and goals as of 11 January 2010 ‡ National team caps and goals as of 27 January 2010

John Anders Bjørkøy (born 8 January 1979) is a retired Norwegian footballer. He was an industrious midfielder, but also played in either full-back position. He is the son of Norwegian tenor Svein Bjørkøy.

== Club career ==
He came to Fredrikstad from Hønefoss BK in the Norwegian First Division July 2005. He made his debut against Lyn on 24 July 2005. Bjørkøy was one of the most consistent players in the team over the last years. He was selected to be Fredrikstad's captain in 2006. In March 2008, Bjørkøy transferred to Lillestrøm SK for a fee of 4 million kr.

== International career ==
His solid performances and good progression has given him a chance to play for the Norwegian national team. His first international match was against Croatia on 6 February 2007. He earned four caps.
