= Kristofer Hæstad =

Norwegian footballer (born 1983)

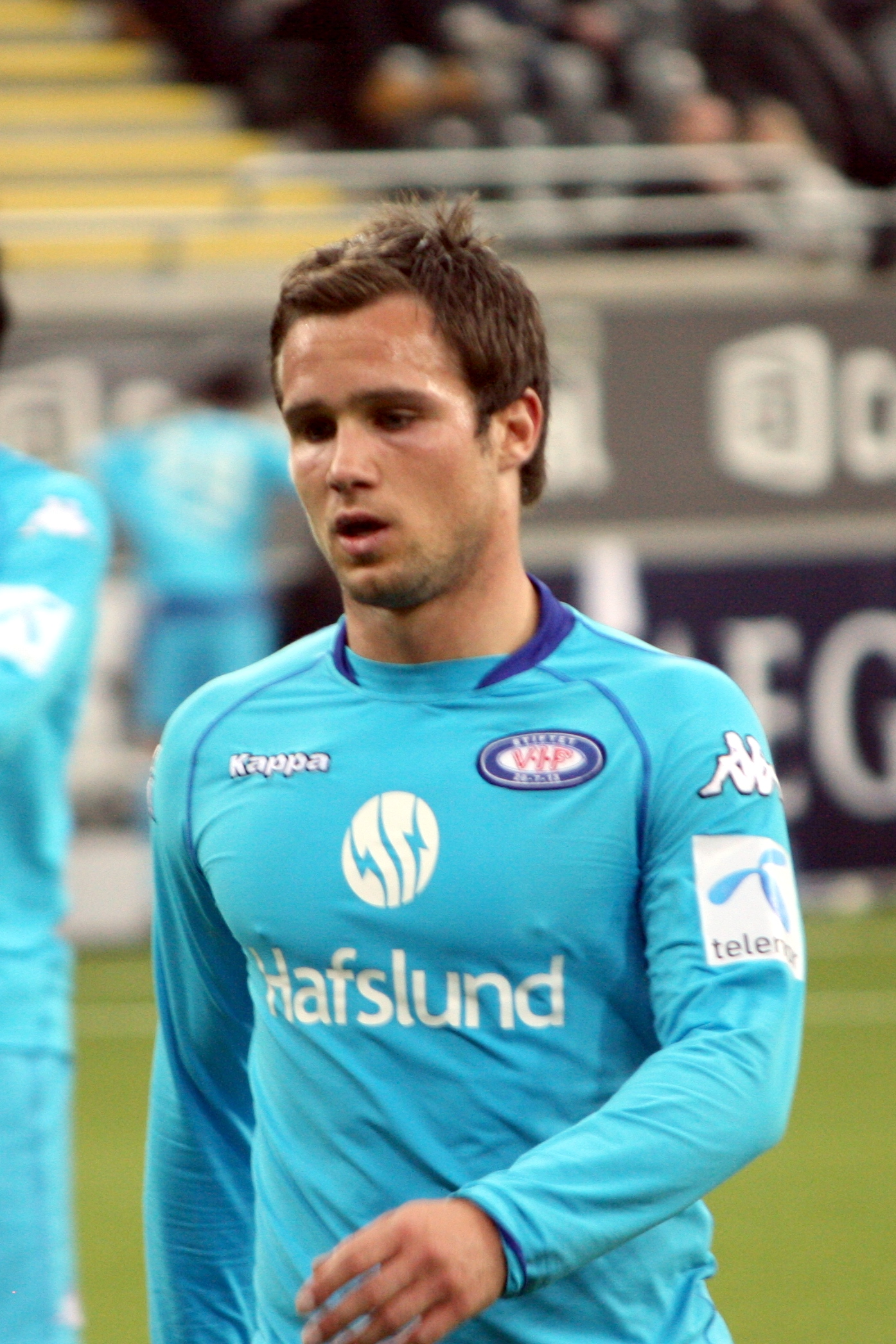
- Hæstad playing for Vålerenga in 2009

Personal information
- Full name: Kristofer Krüger Hæstad
- Date of birth: 9 December 1983 (age 42)
- Place of birth: Kristiansand, Norway
- Height: 1.72 m (5 ft 8 in)
- Position: Midfielder

Youth career
- Randesund
- Vigør

Senior career*
| Years | Team | Apps | (Gls) |
| 2001–2007 | Start | 156 | (20) |
| 2007 | → Wigan Athletic (loan) | 2 | (0) |
| 2008–2014 | Vålerenga | 147 | (9) |

International career
| 2005–2014 | Norway | 27 | (1) |
- * Club domestic league appearances and goals

Kristofer Krüger Hæstad (born 9 December 1983) is a Norwegian former professional footballer who played as a midfielder.

== Early life ==
Hæstad was born in Kristiansand, Agder.

== Club career ==
=== Early career ===
Hæstad played for the youth teams of Randesund and Vigør.

=== Start ===
He was signed by Start in 2001, and debuted in the Norwegian Premier League in 2002, when the youthful Start squad only made 11 points and were relegated.

After two seasons in the First Division, Start were once again promoted in 2004, with Hæstad as one of the team's central players. Hæstad has continued in great form after the promotion, and was named player of the month by NRK in April 2005.

In July 2006, Hæstad launched a music single This Is For Real together with four other professional Norwegian footballers – Morten Gamst Pedersen, Freddy dos Santos, Raymond Kvisvik, and Øyvind Svenning. They call their band The Players.

On 29 December 2006, it was announced that Premier League club Wigan Athletic had secured Hæstad on six-month loan. The Norwegian newspaper VG would later reveal that it not was a standard loan contract, but an intricate deal that could see Hæstad stay at Wigan until July 2010, if they pick up an option to buy him at the end of the current season. Hæstad made his Premier League debut on 13 January 2007 against Chelsea, but was released from his loan contract at Wigan Athletic by mutual consent on 1 April 2007.

Hæstad made a scoring return for Start on his return to Norway after scoring the fourth goal in a 4–2 victory away to Aalesund.

=== Vålerenga ===
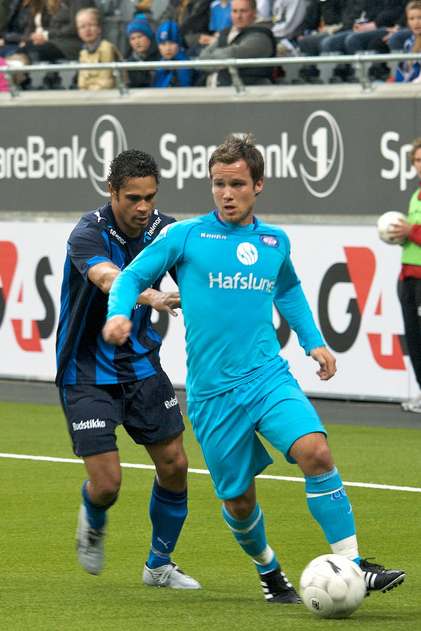
Hæstad (right) playing for Vålerenga in 2009

On 2 January 2008, Hæstad signed a four-year contract with Vålerenga. On 29 March 2008, Hæstad made his competitive debut for Vålerenga in the season's first game against Aalesund. After a poor first season plagued by injuries, and failing to score a goal, rumors said that he was heading away from the club, most likely back to his former club Start. However, he stayed at Vålerenga and had a great second season. He scored his first goal against Start in a 2–3 loss. He also scored two goals against Lyn which ended 4–4.

Hæstad announced his retirement from professional football on 1 July 2014.

== International career ==
24 May 2005, Hæstad debuted for the national team in a private match against Costa Rica.

== Career statistics ==
=== Club ===
| Club | Season | League | | | Cup | | Total | |
| Club | Season | Division | Apps | Goals | Apps | Goals | Apps | Goals |
|---|---|---|---|---|---|---|---|---|
| Start | 2001 | Adeccoligaen | 8 | 1 | 0 | 0 | 8 | 1 |
| Start | 2002 | Tippeligaen | 25 | 2 | 4 | 0 | 29 | 2 |
| Start | 2003 | Adeccoligaen | 25 | 0 | 2 | 0 | 27 | 0 |
| Start | 2004 | Adeccoligaen | 30 | 9 | 0 | 0 | 30 | 9 |
| Start | 2005 | Tippeligaen | 23 | 3 | 4 | 1 | 27 | 4 |
| Start | 2006 | Tippeligaen | 22 | 3 | 3 | 1 | 25 | 4 |
| Start | 2007 | Tippeligaen | 23 | 2 | 2 | 0 | 25 | 2 |
| Wigan Athletic | 2006–07 | Premier League | 2 | 0 | 1 | 0 | 3 | 0 |
| Vålerenga | 2008 | Tippeligaen | 21 | 0 | 5 | 0 | 26 | 0 |
| Vålerenga | 2009 | Tippeligaen | 28 | 4 | 5 | 2 | 33 | 6 |
| Vålerenga | 2010 | Tippeligaen | 27 | 3 | 0 | 0 | 27 | 3 |
| Vålerenga | 2011 | Tippeligaen | 24 | 0 | 1 | 0 | 25 | 0 |
| Vålerenga | 2012 | Tippeligaen | 24 | 1 | 1 | 0 | 25 | 1 |
| Vålerenga | 2013 | Tippeligaen | 23 | 1 | 4 | 0 | 27 | 1 |
| Vålerenga | 2014 | Tippeligaen | 0 | 0 | 2 | 0 | 2 | 0 |
| Career Total | | | 305 | 29 | 34 | 4 | 339 | 33 |

=== International goals ===
| # | Date | Venue | Opponent | Score | Result | Competition |
|---|---|---|---|---|---|---|
| 1 | 2 June 2007 | Ullevaal Stadion, Oslo, Norway | Malta | 4–0 | Win | UEFA Euro 2008 qualifying |

== Honours ==
Individual

- Kniksen award: midfielder of the year in 2005
