= Sandefjord Fotball =

Norwegian association football club

Sandefjord
- Full name: Sandefjord Fotball
- Nickname: Guttane (The Boys) Hvalfangerne (The Whalers)
- Founded: 10 September 1998; 28 years ago
- Ground: Jotun Arena
- Capacity: 6,582
- Chairman: Gunnar Bjønness
- Head coach: Andreas Tegström
- League: Eliteserien
- 2025: Eliteserien, 5th of 16
- Website: www.sandefjordfotball.no
| Home colours | Away colours | Third colours |

Sandefjord Fotball, often referred to simply as Sandefjord, is a Norwegian professional football club founded on 10 September 1998. The team currently competes in Eliteserien, the top division of the Norwegian football league system, and plays its home matches at the Jotun Arena in Sandefjord, Vestfold.

After reaching 1.divisjon (Norway’s second tier) in 1999, Sandefjord quickly established itself as a strong contender for promotion to the top division. The club finished third in 2002 and 2003, qualifying for promotion play-offs but losing on both occasions. In 2004, Sandefjord finished fourth, and in 2005, they achieved second place, earning automatic promotion to Tippeligaen (now Eliteserien).

In their first Tippeligaen season, Sandefjord finished ninth and reached the Norwegian Cup final. However, in 2007, they finished last and were relegated back to 1.divisjon

During the 2008 season in 1.divisjon, Sandefjord overcame a poor start to finish second, securing automatic promotion to Tippeligaen. The 2009 season was a success, with the club finishing eighth, its best top-flight performance to date. However, in 2010, they were relegated once again.

In 2014, Sandefjord won the 1. division title, earning another promotion to Tippeligaen. However, they were relegated in 2015, promoted again in 2016, and then relegated after two seasons in the top tier. Following the 2019 season in the 1. division, the club once again achieved promotion to Eliteserien.

== History ==
Sandefjord were formed by parent clubs IL Runar and Sandefjord Ballklubb in 1998. They replaced Sandefjord Ballklubb in 2.divisjon in 1999, and secured immediate promotion to 1st division. There the club made quick progress and soon settled as a strong competitor for promotion to the Tippeligaen. Finishing third in 1.divisjon in 2002 and 2003 they qualified for play-off matches, but lost both times, against Brann and Vålerenga. The 2003 play-off was lost after some controversial decisions by referee Jonny Ditlefsen that were all in Sandefjords disfavor. When manager Tom Nordlie left after the play-off games, Sandefjord Fotball hired Arne Dokken as their new coach. He was fired after just one season, 2004, when they finished fourth. But the 2005 season finally proved a success, with Tor Thodesen as their new coach. Placing second, Sandefjord earned automatic promotion to the highest division, where they finished 9th in their first season.

When the 2007 season ended, they finished last and were relegated to 1.divisjon. The players went to the board of directors together and requested the hiring of a new coach. Instead of firing Thodesen, the board kept him. After a bad start to the 2008 season, they fired Thodesen and hired Patrick Walker. The team played better after this, and he moved the team from a relegation place to a promotion place in the table in eight games. They continued their form and was placed second in the table, and earned a promotion after just one season.

After a disappointing 2010 season in Tippeligaen, earning only 12 points, they ended the season in last place and was relegated once again, this time for a longer period.

The following three seasons in 1.divisjon did not go as planned for a Sandefjord team that were fighting for promotion. Ending third in the table in both 2011 and 2012, was followed by an even worse finish in 2013, ending in eight place. The club took measures by firing manager Arne Sandstø and hiring former Nottingham Forest and Blackburn Rovers player Lars Bohinen as their new manager. He was brought to the club from Asker where he had success as coach. Sandefjord went on to have their best season ever in 1.divisjon earning 69 points and winning the league title. This was their second ever trophy, the first one being the 2.divisjon in 1999. Back in Tippeligaen they ended in last place and were relegated back to 1.divisjon alongside Mjøndalen. In the 2016 season they clinched their second promotion in three years by finishing second, only beaten by Kristiansund.

== Colours and badge ==
Sandefjord Fotball's colours are blue. They play in blue shirts, blue shorts and blue socks. When the club was formed in 1998, it was decided that the new club would have different colours from its parent clubs Sandefjord BK (yellow and black) and Runar (white). The club changed their badge before the start of the 2006 season. This was mainly for press purposes. The old badge had a yellow field as well as the blue and red. The new badge only has the colours red and blue. Further on, the white whale tail on the badge links to Sandefjord city's whaling history. After the promotion in 2014, Sandefjord played one season in an alternate home kit which consisted of half blue and half red, as in their badge. Relegated to 1.divisjon in 2016, they were back playing in an all blue home kit again.

== Stadium ==
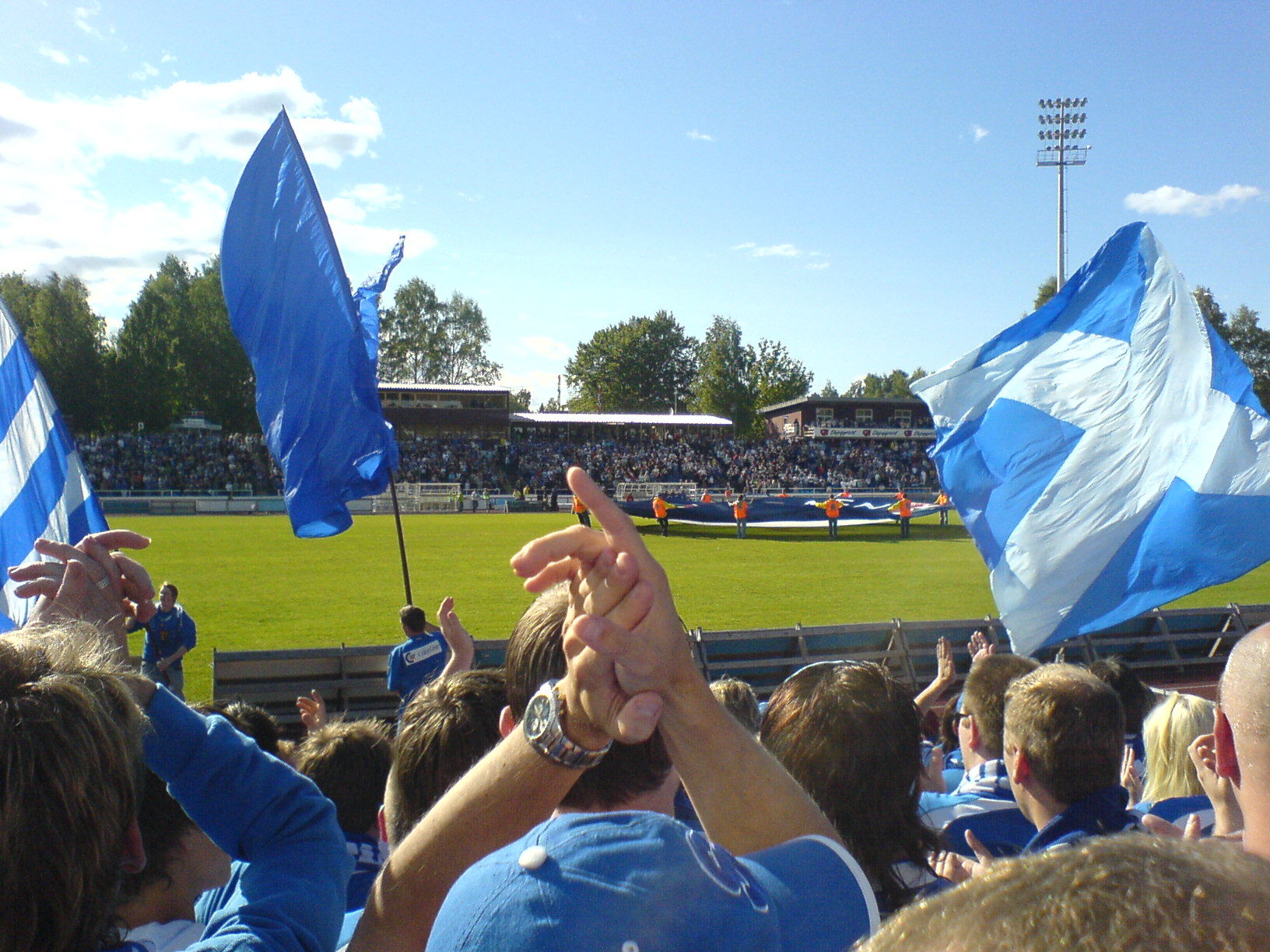
Storstadion

Sandefjord Fotball play their home games at Jotun Arena, previously called Komplett.no Arena and Komplett Arena due to sponsorship deals. Jotun Arena was opened on 21 July 2007, and cost about 100 million kr. This is an all modern stadium, with a capacity of about 6,582. Record attendance was set during the opening game versus Lyn on 21 July 2007. 8,103 people attended this game. In the future it is planned to expand the stadium to a capacity of 8 000. Field measurements are 105 x 68 meters.

Before Sandefjord started to use their new home arena, they used to play their home encounters at Storstadion. There they played their games from 1999 to 2007. A new and modern Jotun Arena was built to start a new chapter in the young club's history.

== Honours ==
- 1.divisjon:
  - Winners (1): 2014
  - Runners-up (4): 2005, 2008, 2016, 2019
- 2.divisjon:
  - Winners (1): 1999
- Norwegian Cup:
  - Runners-up (1): 2006

== Recent history ==
| Season | | Pos. | Pl. | W | D | L | GS | GA | Pts. | Cup | Notes |
|---|---|---|---|---|---|---|---|---|---|---|---|
| 2003 | 1.divisjon | 3 | 30 | 19 | 4 | 7 | 71 | 41 | 61 | 3rd round | Lost promotion play-offs to Tippeligaen |
| 2004 | 1.divisjon | 4 | 30 | 15 | 6 | 9 | 60 | 32 | 51 | Quarter-finals | |
| 2005 | 1.divisjon | ↑ 2 | 30 | 19 | 5 | 6 | 58 | 37 | 62 | 3rd round | Promoted to Tippeligaen |
| 2006 | Tippeligaen | 9 | 26 | 9 | 5 | 12 | 37 | 47 | 32 | Runners-up | |
| 2007 | Tippeligaen | ↓ 14 | 26 | 4 | 4 | 18 | 26 | 53 | 16 | 2nd round | Relegated to Norwegian First Division |
| 2008 | Norwegian First Division | ↑ 2 | 30 | 17 | 9 | 4 | 46 | 25 | 60 | 3rd round | Promoted to Tippeligaen |
| 2009 | Tippeligaen | 8 | 30 | 10 | 10 | 10 | 39 | 44 | 40 | 2nd round | |
| 2010 | Tippeligaen | ↓ 16 | 30 | 2 | 6 | 22 | 25 | 58 | 12 | Fourth round | Relegated to Norwegian First Division |
| 2011 | Norwegian First Division | 3 | 30 | 16 | 5 | 9 | 61 | 38 | 53 | 3rd round | |
| 2012 | Norwegian First Division | 3 | 30 | 16 | 7 | 7 | 44 | 29 | 55 | Quarter-finals | |
| 2013 | Norwegian First Division | 8 | 30 | 12 | 7 | 11 | 39 | 39 | 43 | 3rd round | |
| 2014 | Norwegian First Division | ↑ 1 | 30 | 20 | 9 | 1 | 62 | 24 | 69 | 2nd round | Promoted to Tippeligaen |
| 2015 | Tippeligaen | ↓ 16 | 30 | 4 | 4 | 22 | 36 | 68 | 16 | Quarter-finals | Relegated to Norwegian First Division |
| 2016 | Norwegian First Division | ↑ 2 | 30 | 18 | 5 | 7 | 54 | 34 | 59 | Quarter-finals | Promoted to Eliteserien |
| 2017 | Eliteserien | 13 | 30 | 11 | 3 | 16 | 38 | 51 | 36 | 2nd round | |
| 2018 | Eliteserien | ↓ 16 | 30 | 4 | 11 | 15 | 35 | 57 | 23 | 2nd round | |
| 2019 | Norwegian First Division | ↑ 2 | 30 | 19 | 8 | 3 | 53 | 30 | 65 | 3rd round | Promoted to Eliteserien |
| 2020 | Eliteserien | 11 | 30 | 9 | 8 | 13 | 31 | 43 | 35 | Cancelled | |
| 2021 | Eliteserien | 10 | 30 | 10 | 6 | 14 | 38 | 52 | 36 | 2nd round | |
| 2022 | Eliteserien | 14 | 30 | 6 | 6 | 18 | 42 | 68 | 24 | Quarter-finals | |
| 2023 | Eliteserien | 13 | 30 | 8 | 7 | 15 | 47 | 55 | 31 | 1st round | |
| 2024 | Eliteserien | 10 | 30 | 9 | 7 | 14 | 41 | 46 | 34 | 1st round | |
| 2025 | Eliteserien | 5 | 30 | 15 | 3 | 12 | 55 | 42 | 48 | 3rd round | |
| 2026 (in progress) | Eliteserien | 12 | 25 | 7 | 6 | 12 | 26 | 34 | 27 | 3rd round | |

== Current squad ==
As of 28 September 2026

Note: Flags indicate national team as defined under FIFA eligibility rules; some limited exceptions apply. Players may hold more than one non-FIFA nationality.

| No. | Pos. | Nation | Player |
|---|---|---|---|
| 1 | GK | NOR | Alf Lukas Grønneberg |
| 2 | DF | NOR | Martin Hellan (on loan from Brann) |
| 3 | DF | NOR | Vetle Walle Egeli |
| 4 | DF | NOR | Fredrik Carson Pedersen |
| 5 | DF | DEN | Gustav Højbjerg |
| 6 | MF | NOR | Sander Risan Mørk (captain) |
| 7 | FW | BEL | Evangelos Patoulidis |
| 8 | MF | NOR | Tobias Børkeeiet |
| 9 | FW | NOR | Oscar Kapskarmo |
| 10 | MF | SWE | Ervin Gigovic |
| 11 | FW | SWE | Nikolaj Duus Möller |
| 13 | DF | NOR | Rasmus Holten |
| 14 | MF | NOR | Edvard Sundbø Pettersen |
| 16 | DF | NOR | Håkon Krogelien |
| 17 | FW | GHA | Foster Apetorgbor |

| No. | Pos. | Nation | Player |
|---|---|---|---|
| 18 | FW | DEN | Mathias Sauer |
| 19 | FW | NOR | Bendik Berntsen |
| 20 | MF | NOR | Marcus Melchior |
| 21 | MF | NOR | Jakob Swift |
| 22 | DF | SUR | Devon Koswal |
| 24 | FW | NOR | Sebastian Holm Mathisen |
| 26 | DF | NOR | Filip Loftesnes-Bjune |
| 27 | FW | NOR | Jakob Dunsby (vice-captain) |
| 29 | MF | NOR | Kristoffer Halvorsen |
| 30 | GK | SYR | Elias Hadaya |
| 31 | DF | NOR | Henrik Skretteberg |
| 32 | MF | NOR | Daniel Skaarud |
| 37 | MF | DEN | Jakob Vester |
| 38 | DF | GHA | Christopher Abanga |
| 44 | DF | BEL | Xander Lambrix |

=== Out on loan ===
Note: Flags indicate national team as defined under FIFA eligibility rules; some limited exceptions apply. Players may hold more than one non-FIFA nationality.

| No. | Pos. | Nation | Player |
|---|---|---|---|
| — | MF | SWE | Robin Dzabic (at Degerfors until 31 December 2026) |
| — | DF | NOR | Theodor Agelin (at Jerv until 31 December 2026) |

== Management ==
=== Key people ===
| Position | Nat | Name |
|---|---|---|
| Managing director | (Norway) | Ole Jonny Borgersen-Berg |
| Sporting director | (Norway) | Matteus Bårdsen |

=== Coaching staff ===
| Position | Nat | Name |
|---|---|---|
| Head coach | (Sweden) | Andreas Tegström |
| Assistant coach | (Norway) | Per Verner Rønning |
| Goalkeeping coach | (Spain) | Jordi Cumelles Comas |
| Performance analyst | (Norway) | Geir Omli |
| Top player developer | (Norway) | Henrik Gustavsen |
| Physio | (Norway) | Ola Olsen |
| Physio | (Norway) | Matias Moen Skoglund |
| Physio | (Norway) | Duy Nhat Huynh |
| Osteopath/physio | (Norway) | Espen Strøm-Normann |
| Physical trainer | (Iceland) | Arnór Snær Gudmundsson |
| Development leader | (Denmark) | Martin Jensen |
| Under-19/-21 head coach | (Bosnia and Herzegovina) | Samir Saric |
| Under-19/-21 assistant coach | (Norway) | Sigurd Andreas Holmen |
| Under-17 head coach | (Iceland) | Axel Örn Sæmundsson |
| Under-17 assistant coach | (Norway) | Lars Markmanrud |
| Under-15 head coach | (Faroe Islands) | Ríkin Napoleon Djurhuus |
| Under-15 assistant coach | (Norway) | Christoffer Enge |
| Under-14 head coach | (Norway) | Kristian Rinaldo Pedersen |
| Under-14 assistant coach | (Sweden) | Andreas Drugge |
| Under-13 head coach | (Norway) | Anders Abrahamsen |
| Under-13 assistant coach | (Norway) | Thor Ketil Kvitvær |
| Coach developer | (Norway) | Geir Ludvig Fevang |
| Equipment manager | (Norway) | Thomas Naastad |
| Assistant equipment manager | (Norway) | Frode Riis |

=== Manager history ===
| Name | Nat | From | To |
|---|---|---|---|
| Trond Skrede | (Norway) | 1999 | 2001 |
| Tom Nordlie | (Norway) | 2002 | 2003 |
| Arne Dokken | (Norway) | 2004 | 2004 |
| Tor Thodesen | (Norway) | 2005 | 2008 |
| Patrick Walker | (Republic of Ireland) | 2008 | 2011 |
| Arne Sandstø | (Norway) | 2011 | 2013 |
| Lars Bohinen | (Norway) | 2013 | 2017 |
| Magnus Powell | (Sweden) | 2018 | 2018 |
| Martí Cifuentes | (Spain) | 2018 | 2020 |
| Hans Erik Ødegaard; Andreas Tegström | (Norway) (Sweden) | 2021 | 2024 |
| Andreas Tegström | (Sweden) | 2024 | |
