= 1995 in Norwegian football =

Football in Norway
- Season: 1995

Men's football
- Tippeligaen: Rosenborg
- 1. divisjon: Moss (Group 1); Skeid (Group 2)
- 2. divisjon: Elverum (Group 1); Ullern (Group 2); Mjøndalen (Group 3); Vidar (Group 4); Byåsen (Group 5); Harstad (Group 6)
- Cupen: Rosenborg

Women's football
- 1. divisjon: Trondheims-Ørn
- Cupen: Sandviken

The 1995 season was the 90th season of competitive football in Norway.

== Men's football ==
=== League season ===
==== Promotion and relegation ====
League	Promoted to league	Relegated from league
Tippeligaen	Strindheim; Stabæk; Hødd; Molde	Sogndal; Strømsgodset
1. divisjon	Aalesund; Haugesund; Odd Grenland; Sandefjord BK; Sarpsborg; Stålkameratene	Stjørdals-Blink; Bærum; Vidar; Mjøndalen

==== Tippeligaen ====
Pos	Team	Pld	W	D	L	GF	GA	GD	Pts	Qualification or relegation
1	Rosenborg (C)	26	19	5	2	78	29	+49	62	Qualification for the Champions League second qualifying round
2	Molde	26	14	5	7	60	47	+13	47	Qualification for the UEFA Cup qualifying round
3	Bodø/Glimt	26	12	7	7	65	43	+22	43	Qualification for the UEFA Cup qualifying round
4	Lillestrøm	26	11	8	7	50	36	+14	41	Qualification for the Intertoto Cup group stage
5	Viking	26	12	4	10	55	42	+13	40	
6	Tromsø	26	11	5	10	53	42	+11	38	
7	VIF Fotball	26	11	6	9	47	44	+3	37 (Note: VIF Fotball were deducted two points due to financial issues.)	
8	Start	26	11	1	14	51	52	−1	34	
9	Stabæk	26	9	6	11	36	40	−4	33	
10	Brann	26	9	5	12	40	50	−10	32	Qualification for the Cup Winners' Cup qualifying round
11	Kongsvinger	26	7	8	11	37	54	−17	29	
12	Hødd (R)	26	8	4	14	38	57	−19	28	Relegation to First Division
13	Ham-Kam (R)	26	8	3	15	33	66	−33	27	Relegation to First Division
14	Strindheim (R)	26	4	5	17	36	77	−41	17	Relegation to First Division

Source: fotball.no
Rules for classification: 1) points; 2) goal difference; 3) number of goals scored.
(C) Champions; (R) Relegated

==== 1. divisjon ====
===== Group 1 =====
Pos	Team	Pld	W	D	L	GF	GA	GD	Pts	Promotion, qualification or relegation
1	Moss (C, P)	22	13	7	2	40	22	+18	46	Promotion to Tippeligaen
2	Sogndal	22	13	5	4	42	21	+21	44	Qualification for the promotion play-offs
3	Drøbak/Frogn	22	13	4	5	60	35	+25	43	
4	Haugesund	22	12	2	8	41	33	+8	38	
5	Åsane	22	10	4	8	38	31	+7	34	
6	Aalesund	22	8	8	6	43	33	+10	32	
7	Bryne	22	7	9	6	28	31	−3	30	
8	Fana	22	8	4	10	31	42	−11	28	
9	Fyllingen	22	4	8	10	33	45	−12	20	
10	Åndalsnes (R)	22	4	6	12	22	38	−16	18	Relegation to Second Division
11	Sarpsborg (R)	22	3	8	11	17	38	−21	17	Relegation to Second Division
12	Vard Haugesund (R)	22	4	1	17	17	43	−26	13	Relegation to Second Division

Source: nifs.no
Rules for classification: 1) points; 2) goal difference; 3) number of goals scored.
(C) Champions; (P) Promoted; (R) Relegated

===== Group 2 =====
Pos	Team	Pld	W	D	L	GF	GA	GD	Pts	Promotion, qualification or relegation
1	Skeid (C, P)	22	19	1	2	59	21	+38	58	Promotion to Tippeligaen
2	Strømsgodset (O, P)	22	16	3	3	51	15	+36	51	Qualification for the promotion play-offs
3	Eik-Tønsberg	22	14	4	4	57	24	+33	46	
4	Odd Grenland	22	12	2	8	54	25	+29	38	
5	Tromsdalen	22	10	5	7	37	25	+12	35	
6	Lyn	22	11	1	10	31	29	+2	34	
7	Nardo	22	7	1	14	31	45	−14	22	
8	Stålkameratene	22	6	4	12	24	53	−29	22	
9	Jevnaker	22	6	3	13	30	44	−14	21	
10	Alta (R)	22	6	3	13	30	53	−23	21	Relegation to Second Division
11	Sandefjord BK (R)	22	4	7	11	17	38	−21	19	Relegation to Second Division
12	Mjølner (R)	22	3	2	17	20	69	−49	11	Relegation to Second Division

Source: nifs.no
Rules for classification: 1) points; 2) goal difference; 3) number of goals scored.
(C) Champions; (O) Play-off winners; (P) Promoted; (R) Relegated

==== 2. divisjon ====
===== Group 1 =====
Pos	Team	Pld	W	D	L	GF	GA	GD	Pts	Promotion or relegation
1	Elverum (P)	22	15	3	4	51	27	+24	48	Promotion to First Division
2	Nybergsund	22	14	4	4	46	26	+20	46	
3	Fredrikstad	22	12	5	5	45	33	+12	41	
4	Rakkestad	22	10	4	8	41	39	+2	34	
5	Strømmen	22	9	6	7	44	30	+14	33	
6	Ham-Kam 2	22	8	6	8	38	38	0	30	
7	Lillestrøm 2	22	9	3	10	31	33	−2	30	
8	Skjetten	22	8	5	9	35	41	−6	29	
9	Faaberg	22	7	6	9	39	31	+8	27	
10	Råde (R)	22	7	2	13	29	47	−18	23	Relegation to Third Division
11	Sprint-Jeløy (R)	22	6	3	13	34	53	−19	21	Relegation to Third Division
12	Lørenskog (R)	22	2	3	17	28	63	−35	9	Relegation to Third Division

(P) Promoted; (R) Relegated

===== Group 2 =====
Pos	Team	Pld	W	D	L	GF	GA	GD	Pts	Promotion or relegation
1	Ullern (P)	22	15	5	2	48	19	+29	50	Promotion to First Division
2	Bærum	22	12	5	5	47	27	+20	41	
3	Kjelsås	22	12	4	6	42	19	+23	40	
4	Ski	22	10	7	5	43	22	+21	37	
5	Skarbøvik	22	11	2	9	45	38	+7	35	
6	Fossum	22	9	2	11	34	47	−13	29	
7	Sogndal 2 (R)	22	8	4	10	43	47	−4	28	Relegation to Third Division
8	Holter	22	8	4	10	45	50	−5	28	
9	Ørsta	22	7	3	12	34	59	−25	24	
10	Sørumsand (R)	22	7	2	13	31	40	−9	23	Relegation to Third Division
11	Eidsvold Turn (R)	22	5	4	13	33	46	−13	19	Relegation to Third Division
12	Florø (R)	22	5	4	13	22	53	−31	19	Relegation to Third Division

(P) Promoted; (R) Relegated

===== Group 3 =====
Pos	Team	Pld	W	D	L	GF	GA	GD	Pts	Promotion or relegation
1	Mjøndalen (P)	22	12	6	4	47	25	+22	42	Promotion to First Division
2	Åssiden	22	12	3	7	43	33	+10	39	
3	Falk	22	11	4	7	41	33	+8	37	
4	Flekkefjord	22	11	3	8	46	43	+3	36	
5	Vigør	22	9	8	5	40	37	+3	35	
6	Runar	22	9	7	6	48	28	+20	34	
7	Liv/Fossekallen	22	9	5	8	40	33	+7	32	
8	Start 2	22	9	3	10	51	46	+5	30	
9	Ørn-Horten	22	8	6	8	31	37	−6	30	
10	IF Pors (Note: Pors survived as the best number-ten-team.)	22	8	4	10	33	39	−6	28	
11	Øyestad (R)	22	6	1	15	29	56	−27	19	Relegation to Third Division
12	Fram Larvik (R)	22	3	0	19	17	56	−39	9	Relegation to Third Division

(P) Promoted; (R) Relegated

===== Group 4 =====
Pos	Team	Pld	W	D	L	GF	GA	GD	Pts	Promotion or relegation
1	Vidar (P)	22	15	4	3	58	22	+36	49	Promotion to First Division
2	Os	22	13	3	6	43	27	+16	42	
3	Viking 2	22	11	2	9	53	38	+15	35	
4	Kopervik	22	8	8	6	30	25	+5	32	
5	Ålgård	22	8	6	8	32	34	−2	30	
6	Randaberg	22	9	3	10	30	37	−7	30	
7	Klepp	22	8	5	9	35	38	−3	29	
8	Vedavåg	22	8	5	9	33	40	−7	29	
9	Nest-Sotra	22	6	10	6	43	43	0	28	
10	Hana (Note: Hana survived as the second best number-ten-team.)	22	8	4	10	33	42	−9	28	
11	Nord (R)	22	5	3	14	33	51	−18	18	Relegation to Third Division
12	Bjørnar (R)	22	5	3	14	29	56	−27	18	Relegation to Third Division

(P) Promoted; (R) Relegated

===== Group 5 =====
Pos	Team	Pld	W	D	L	GF	GA	GD	Pts	Promotion or relegation
1	Byåsen (P)	22	15	4	3	59	31	+28	49	Promotion to First Division
2	Rosenborg 2	22	15	2	5	67	28	+39	47	
3	Kolstad	22	15	2	5	62	39	+23	47	
4	Verdal	22	14	3	5	51	23	+28	45	
5	Orkdal	22	10	3	9	52	43	+9	33	
6	Stjørdals-Blink	22	10	3	9	49	40	+9	33	
7	Steinkjer	22	10	3	9	53	47	+6	33	
8	Melhus	22	9	3	10	42	37	+5	30	
9	Orkanger	22	7	3	12	32	51	−19	24	
10	Clausenengen (R)	22	5	2	15	23	59	−36	17	Relegation to Third Division
11	Kristiansund (R)	22	4	2	16	25	58	−33	14	Relegation to Third Division
12	Fram Skatval (R)	22	2	2	18	15	74	−59	8	Relegation to Third Division

(P) Promoted; (R) Relegated

===== Group 6 =====
Pos	Team	Pld	W	D	L	GF	GA	GD	Pts	Promotion or relegation
1	Harstad (P)	22	15	3	4	48	20	+28	48	Promotion to First Division
2	Grovfjord	22	11	6	5	48	36	+12	39	
3	Fauske/Sprint	22	12	0	10	54	44	+10	36	
4	Silsand/Omegn	22	10	3	9	49	37	+12	33	
5	Skjervøy	22	10	3	9	47	39	+8	33	
6	Sortland	22	9	5	8	42	35	+7	32	
7	Gevir Bodø	22	10	2	10	44	45	−1	32	
8	Lofoten (R)	22	9	3	10	39	42	−3	30	Relegation to Third Division
9	Skarp (R)	22	8	5	9	44	43	+1	29	Relegation to Third Division
10	Lyngen/Karnes (R)	22	7	5	10	30	41	−11	26	Relegation to Third Division
11	Mo/Bossmo (R)	22	6	3	13	33	60	−27	21	Relegation to Third Division
12	Honningsvåg (R)	22	4	4	14	37	73	−36	16	Relegation to Third Division

(P) Promoted; (R) Relegated

=== Norwegian Cup ===
==== Final ====
29 October 1995
13:15 CET (UTC+1)

Brann	1–1 (a.e.t.)	Rosenborg
Strandli 72' (pen.)	Report	Strand 61'

Ullevaal Stadion, Oslo
Attendance: 27,561
Referee: Jon Skjervold (Fet)

Replay

5 November 1995
13:15 CET (UTC+1)

Rosenborg	3–1	Brann
Staurvik 23' (pen.); Hoftun 37'; Iversen 50'	Report	Ludvigsen 21'

Ullevaal Stadion, Oslo
Attendance: 20,076
Referee: Rune Pedersen (Sprint/Jeløy)

== Women's football ==
=== League season ===
==== 1. divisjon ====
Pos	Team	Pld	W	D	L	GF	GA	GD	Pts	Relegation
1	Trondheims-Ørn (C)	18	15	2	1	74	14	+60	47	
2	Setskog/Høland	18	13	1	4	62	30	+32	40	
3	Sandviken	18	10	4	4	45	24	+21	34	
4	Asker	18	10	1	7	45	30	+15	31	
5	Sprint/Jeløy	18	8	2	8	28	32	−4	26	
6	Kolbotn	18	7	3	8	31	42	−11	24	
7	Haugar	18	7	0	11	28	40	−12	21	
8	Klepp	18	5	3	10	23	37	−14	18	
9	Donn (R)	18	4	3	11	15	54	−39	15	Relegation to Second Division
10	Grand Bodø (R)	18	1	1	16	19	67	−48	4	Relegation to Second Division

(C) Champions; (R) Relegated

=== Norwegian Women's Cup ===
==== Final ====
- Sandviken 3–2 (a.e.t.) Trondheims-Ørn

== UEFA competitions ==
=== UEFA Champions League ===
==== Qualifying round ====
Team 1	Agg.	Team 2	1st leg	2nd leg
Rosenborg (Norway)	4–3	(Turkey) Beşiktaş	3–0	1–3

==== Group stage ====
===== Group B =====
Team	Pld	W	D	L	GF	GA	GD	Pts
(Russia) Spartak Moscow	6	6	0	0	15	4	+11	18
(Poland) Legia Warsaw	6	2	1	3	5	8	−3	7
(Norway) Rosenborg	6	2	0	4	11	16	−5	6
(England) Blackburn Rovers	6	1	1	4	5	8	−3	4

=== UEFA Cup Winners' Cup ===
==== Qualifying round ====
Team 1	Agg.	Team 2	1st leg	2nd leg
Dinamo-93 Minsk (Belarus)	2–3	(Norway) Molde	1–1	1–2

==== First round ====
Team 1	Agg.	Team 2	1st leg	2nd leg
Molde (Norway)	2–6	(France) Paris Saint-Germain	2–3	0–3

=== UEFA Cup ===
==== Preliminary round ====
Team 1	Agg.	Team 2	1st leg	2nd leg
Lillestrøm (Norway)	4–1	(Estonia) Flora Tallinn	4–0	0–1
TPV Tampere (Finland)	1–7	(Norway) Viking	0–4	1–3

==== First round ====
Team 1	Agg.	Team 2	1st leg	2nd leg
Brøndby (Denmark)	3–0	(Norway) Lillestrøm	3–0	0–0
Viking (Norway)	1–2	(France) Auxerre	1–1	0–1

== National teams ==
=== Norway men's national football team ===
==== Results ====
6 February 1995 Friendly	Estonia	0–7	Norway	Larnaca, Cyprus
CET (UTC+1)		Report	Mini Jakobsen 4', 73'; Lars Bohinen 13', 58'; Harald Brattbakk 48', 89'; Gunnar Halle 57'	Stadium: GSZ Stadium; Attendance: 200; Referee: Tasos Papaioannou (Cyprus)
