= 1995 Norwegian Second Division =

Norwegian football league season

The 1995 2. divisjon, the third highest association football league for men in Norway.

22 games were played in 6 groups, with 3 points given for wins and 1 for draws. Elverum, Ullern, Mjøndalen, Vidar, Byåsen and Harstad were promoted to the First Division. Number ten, eleven and twelve were relegated to the 3. divisjon. The winning teams from each of the 19 groups in the 3. divisjon were promoted to the 2. divisjon.

== League tables ==
=== Group 1 ===
Pos	Team	Pld	W	D	L	GF	GA	GD	Pts	Promotion or relegation
1	Elverum (P)	22	15	3	4	51	27	+24	48	Promotion to First Division
2	Nybergsund	22	14	4	4	46	26	+20	46	
3	Fredrikstad	22	12	5	5	45	33	+12	41	
4	Rakkestad	22	10	4	8	41	39	+2	34	
5	Strømmen	22	9	6	7	44	30	+14	33	
6	Ham-Kam 2	22	8	6	8	38	38	0	30	
7	Lillestrøm 2	22	9	3	10	31	33	−2	30	
8	Skjetten	22	8	5	9	35	41	−6	29	
9	Faaberg	22	7	6	9	39	31	+8	27	
10	Råde (R)	22	7	2	13	29	47	−18	23	Relegation to Third Division
11	Sprint-Jeløy (R)	22	6	3	13	34	53	−19	21	Relegation to Third Division
12	Lørenskog (R)	22	2	3	17	28	63	−35	9	Relegation to Third Division

(P) Promoted; (R) Relegated

=== Group 2 ===
Pos	Team	Pld	W	D	L	GF	GA	GD	Pts	Promotion or relegation
1	Ullern (P)	22	15	5	2	48	19	+29	50	Promotion to First Division
2	Bærum	22	12	5	5	47	27	+20	41	
3	Kjelsås	22	12	4	6	42	19	+23	40	
4	Ski	22	10	7	5	43	22	+21	37	
5	Skarbøvik	22	11	2	9	45	38	+7	35	
6	Fossum	22	9	2	11	34	47	−13	29	
7	Sogndal 2 (R)	22	8	4	10	43	47	−4	28	Relegation to Third Division
8	Holter	22	8	4	10	45	50	−5	28	
9	Ørsta	22	7	3	12	34	59	−25	24	
10	Sørumsand (R)	22	7	2	13	31	40	−9	23	Relegation to Third Division
11	Eidsvold Turn (R)	22	5	4	13	33	46	−13	19	Relegation to Third Division
12	Florø (R)	22	5	4	13	22	53	−31	19	Relegation to Third Division

(P) Promoted; (R) Relegated

=== Group 3 ===
Pos	Team	Pld	W	D	L	GF	GA	GD	Pts	Promotion or relegation
1	Mjøndalen (P)	22	12	6	4	47	25	+22	42	Promotion to First Division
2	Åssiden	22	12	3	7	43	33	+10	39	
3	Falk	22	11	4	7	41	33	+8	37	
4	Flekkefjord	22	11	3	8	46	43	+3	36	
5	Vigør	22	9	8	5	40	37	+3	35	
6	Runar	22	9	7	6	48	28	+20	34	
7	Liv/Fossekallen	22	9	5	8	40	33	+7	32	
8	Start 2	22	9	3	10	51	46	+5	30	
9	Ørn-Horten	22	8	6	8	31	37	−6	30	
10	IF Pors (Note: Pors survived as the best number-ten-team.)	22	8	4	10	33	39	−6	28	
11	Øyestad (R)	22	6	1	15	29	56	−27	19	Relegation to Third Division
12	Fram Larvik (R)	22	3	0	19	17	56	−39	9	Relegation to Third Division

(P) Promoted; (R) Relegated

=== Group 4 ===
Pos	Team	Pld	W	D	L	GF	GA	GD	Pts	Promotion or relegation
1	Vidar (P)	22	15	4	3	58	22	+36	49	Promotion to First Division
2	Os	22	13	3	6	43	27	+16	42	
3	Viking 2	22	11	2	9	53	38	+15	35	
4	Kopervik	22	8	8	6	30	25	+5	32	
5	Ålgård	22	8	6	8	32	34	−2	30	
6	Randaberg	22	9	3	10	30	37	−7	30	
7	Klepp	22	8	5	9	35	38	−3	29	
8	Vedavåg	22	8	5	9	33	40	−7	29	
9	Nest-Sotra	22	6	10	6	43	43	0	28	
10	Hana (Note: Hana survived as the second best number-ten-team.)	22	8	4	10	33	42	−9	28	
11	Nord (R)	22	5	3	14	33	51	−18	18	Relegation to Third Division
12	Bjørnar (R)	22	5	3	14	29	56	−27	18	Relegation to Third Division

(P) Promoted; (R) Relegated

=== Group 5 ===
Pos	Team	Pld	W	D	L	GF	GA	GD	Pts	Promotion or relegation
1	Byåsen (P)	22	15	4	3	59	31	+28	49	Promotion to First Division
2	Rosenborg 2	22	15	2	5	67	28	+39	47	
3	Kolstad	22	15	2	5	62	39	+23	47	
4	Verdal	22	14	3	5	51	23	+28	45	
5	Orkdal	22	10	3	9	52	43	+9	33	
6	Stjørdals-Blink	22	10	3	9	49	40	+9	33	
7	Steinkjer	22	10	3	9	53	47	+6	33	
8	Melhus	22	9	3	10	42	37	+5	30	
9	Orkanger	22	7	3	12	32	51	−19	24	
10	Clausenengen (R)	22	5	2	15	23	59	−36	17	Relegation to Third Division
11	Kristiansund (R)	22	4	2	16	25	58	−33	14	Relegation to Third Division
12	Fram Skatval (R)	22	2	2	18	15	74	−59	8	Relegation to Third Division

(P) Promoted; (R) Relegated

=== Group 6 ===
Pos	Team	Pld	W	D	L	GF	GA	GD	Pts	Promotion or relegation
1	Harstad (P)	22	15	3	4	48	20	+28	48	Promotion to First Division
2	Grovfjord	22	11	6	5	48	36	+12	39	
3	Fauske/Sprint	22	12	0	10	54	44	+10	36	
4	Silsand/Omegn	22	10	3	9	49	37	+12	33	
5	Skjervøy	22	10	3	9	47	39	+8	33	
6	Sortland	22	9	5	8	42	35	+7	32	
7	Gevir Bodø	22	10	2	10	44	45	−1	32	
8	Lofoten (R)	22	9	3	10	39	42	−3	30	Relegation to Third Division
9	Skarp (R)	22	8	5	9	44	43	+1	29	Relegation to Third Division
10	Lyngen/Karnes (R)	22	7	5	10	30	41	−11	26	Relegation to Third Division
11	Mo/Bossmo (R)	22	6	3	13	33	60	−27	21	Relegation to Third Division
12	Honningsvåg (R)	22	4	4	14	37	73	−36	16	Relegation to Third Division

(P) Promoted; (R) Relegated
