= 1993 Norwegian Second Division =

Norwegian football league season

In the 1993 2. divisjon, the third highest association football league for men in Norway, 22 games were played in 6 groups, with 3 points given for wins and 1 for draws. Jevnaker, Åndalsnes, Stabæk, Vidar, Stjørdals-Blink and Alta were promoted to the First Division. Number ten, eleven and twelve were relegated to the 3. divisjon. The winning teams from each of the 19 groups in the 3. divisjon were promoted to the 2. divisjon.

== League tables ==
=== Group 1 ===
Pos	Team	Pld	W	D	L	GF	GA	GD	Pts	Promotion or relegation
1	Jevnaker (P)	22	13	7	2	62	21	+41	46	Promotion to First Division
2	Fredrikstad	22	13	4	5	56	33	+23	43	
3	Råde	22	12	4	6	48	40	+8	40	
4	Nybergsund	22	11	5	6	48	31	+17	38	
5	Ullern	22	9	5	8	47	50	−3	32	
6	Grue	22	8	5	9	38	46	−8	29	
7	Sprint-Jeløy	22	8	5	9	38	51	−13	29	
8	Mercantile	22	7	7	8	28	34	−6	28	
9	Selbak	22	7	4	11	41	45	−4	25	
10	Grei (R)	22	7	3	12	34	32	+2	24	Relegation to Third Division
11	Frigg (R)	22	4	5	13	32	54	−22	17	Relegation to Third Division
12	Galterud (R)	22	3	6	13	31	66	−35	15	Relegation to Third Division

(P) Promoted; (R) Relegated

=== Group 2 ===
Pos	Team	Pld	W	D	L	GF	GA	GD	Pts	Promotion or relegation
1	Åndalsnes (Note: 3 bonus points awarded?) (P)	21	13	2	6	42	28	+14	44	Promotion to First Division
2	Sørumsand	22	12	6	4	39	28	+11	42	
3	Lørenskog	22	11	5	6	42	28	+14	38	
4	Odd	22	11	4	7	44	33	+11	37	
5	Lillestrøm 2	22	10	6	6	39	30	+9	36	
6	Ørsta	22	7	9	6	31	32	−1	30	
7	Pors	22	8	5	9	32	39	−7	29	
8	Kjelsås	22	8	3	11	38	38	0	27	
9	Volda	22	8	2	12	41	43	−2	26	
10	Eidsvold Turn (R)	22	6	5	11	31	37	−6	23	Relegation to Third Division
11	Sogndal 2 (R)	22	6	5	11	28	43	−15	23	Relegation to Third Division
12	Kolbotn (R)	22	3	4	15	20	48	−28	13	Relegation to Third Division

(P) Promoted; (R) Relegated

=== Group 3 ===
Pos	Team	Pld	W	D	L	GF	GA	GD	Pts	Promotion or relegation
1	Stabæk (P)	22	16	2	4	51	26	+25	50	Promotion to First Division
2	Sandefjord	22	15	4	3	78	21	+57	49	
3	Falk	22	12	4	6	37	36	+1	40	
4	Fram Larvik	22	10	5	7	42	33	+9	35	
5	Ørn-Horten	22	10	5	7	27	26	+1	35	
6	Brann 2	22	10	3	9	50	55	−5	33	
7	Lyn 2	22	10	2	10	34	39	−5	32	
8	Os	22	7	6	9	29	39	−10	27	
9	Runar	22	6	5	11	28	36	−8	23	
10	Florvåg (R)	22	5	5	12	32	49	−17	20	Relegation to Third Division
11	Stord (R)	22	3	6	13	27	47	−20	15	Relegation to Third Division
12	Løv-Ham (R)	22	3	3	16	28	56	−28	12	Relegation to Third Division

(P) Promoted; (R) Relegated

=== Group 4 ===
Pos	Team	Pld	W	D	L	GF	GA	GD	Pts	Promotion or relegation
1	Vidar (P)	22	18	3	1	59	18	+41	57	Promotion to First Division
2	Start 2	22	12	7	3	54	30	+24	43	
3	Flekkefjord	22	11	6	5	50	37	+13	39	
4	Ålgård	22	10	6	6	44	33	+11	36	
5	Klepp	22	9	4	9	45	40	+5	31	
6	Viking 2	22	7	8	7	43	35	+8	29	
7	Haugar (Note: Haugar merged and formed FK Haugesund from the next season.)	22	7	5	10	37	51	−14	26	
8	Ulf-Sandnes	22	7	5	10	39	57	−18	26	
9	Vedavåg	22	6	7	9	39	46	−7	25	
10	Donn (R)	22	4	7	11	30	42	−12	19	Relegation to Third Division
11	Jerv (R)	22	3	8	11	29	40	−11	17	Relegation to Third Division
12	Egersund (R)	22	3	4	15	27	67	−40	13	Relegation to Third Division

(P) Promoted; (R) Relegated

=== Group 5 ===
Pos	Team	Pld	W	D	L	GF	GA	GD	Pts	Promotion or relegation
1	Stjørdals-Blink (P)	22	15	4	3	66	19	+47	49	Promotion to First Division
2	Kolstad	22	14	3	5	55	37	+18	45	
3	Steinkjer	22	13	4	5	59	44	+15	43	
4	Byåsen	22	11	6	5	53	38	+15	39	
5	Rosenborg 2	22	11	5	6	46	27	+19	38	
6	Melhus	22	8	6	8	35	36	−1	30	
7	Sunndal	22	7	8	7	37	39	−2	29	
8	Orkdal	22	8	4	10	49	40	+9	28	
9	Namsos	22	8	2	12	42	54	−12	26	
10	Surnadal (R)	22	6	2	14	30	55	−25	20	Relegation to Third Division
11	Averøykameratene (R)	22	3	5	14	22	52	−30	14	Relegation to Third Division
12	Nessegutten (R)	22	2	3	17	27	80	−53	9	Relegation to Third Division

(P) Promoted; (R) Relegated

=== Group 6 ===
Pos	Team	Pld	W	D	L	GF	GA	GD	Pts	Promotion or relegation
1	Alta (P)	22	12	8	2	57	28	+29	44	Promotion to First Division
2	Grovfjord	22	14	2	6	46	31	+15	44	
3	Gevir Bodø	22	12	4	6	64	41	+23	40	
4	Harstad	101	12	2	87	41	27	+14	38	
5	Sortland	22	9	7	6	49	37	+12	34	
6	Skarp	22	10	2	10	38	40	−2	32	
7	Lyngen/Karnes	22	9	4	9	37	38	−1	31	
8	Stålkameratene	22	8	4	10	43	52	−9	28	
9	Tromsø 2	22	7	5	10	58	42	+16	26	
10	Fauske/Sprint (R)	22	8	1	13	40	57	−17	25	Relegation to Third Division
11	Honningsvåg (R)	22	6	6	10	30	48	−18	24	Relegation to Third Division
12	Polarstjernen (R)	22	2	1	19	16	78	−62	7	Relegation to Third Division

(P) Promoted; (R) Relegated
