= 1996 Norwegian First Division =

1. divisjon
- Season: 1996
- Promoted: Lyn; Haugesund; Sogndal
- Matches played: 264
- Goals scored: 907 (3.44 per match)

The 1996 1. divisjon, Norway's second-tier football league, began play on 28 April 1996 and ended on 29 September 1996. The league was contested by 24 teams, divided in two groups and the winner of each group won promotion to Tippeligaen, while the runners-up played a promotion-playoff to win promotion. This was the last season that this league was divided into two groups, so bottom six teams was relegated to 2. divisjon, while the sixth-placed team place a play-off against the winners of the group-winners in the 2. divisjon.

Lyn and Haugesund won promotion to Tippeligaen as group-winners, while Sogndal was promoted after beating Odd in the promotion play-off. Jevnaker, Tromsdalen, Ullern, Elverum, Stålkameratene, Mjøndalen, Fana, Strindheim, Nardo, Vidar, Åsane and Fyllingen was relegated to the Second Division, while Harstad and Byåsen avoided relegation through after winning the playoff.

== League tables ==
=== Group 1 ===
Pos	Team	Pld	W	D	L	GF	GA	GD	Pts	Promotion, qualification or relegation
1	Lyn (C, P)	22	15	4	3	53	17	+36	49	Promotion to Tippeligaen
2	Odd Grenland	22	16	1	5	49	23	+26	49	Qualification for the promotion play-offs
3	HamKam	22	13	2	7	45	26	+19	41	
4	Drøbak/Frogn	22	12	5	5	47	29	+18	41	
5	Eik-Tønsberg	22	10	4	8	48	30	+18	34	
6	Harstad (O)	22	9	3	10	29	47	−18	30	Qualification for the relegation play-offs
7	Jevnaker (R)	22	8	5	9	40	46	−6	29	Relegation to Second Division
8	Tromsdalen (R)	22	8	4	10	46	49	−3	28	Relegation to Second Division
9	Ullern (R)	22	5	7	10	29	42	−13	22	Relegation to Second Division
10	Elverum (R)	22	6	2	14	30	53	−23	20	Relegation to Second Division
11	Stålkameratene (R)	22	4	5	13	28	49	−21	17	Relegation to Second Division
12	Mjøndalen (R)	22	4	2	16	24	57	−33	14	Relegation to Second Division

Source: nifs.no
Rules for classification: 1) points; 2) goal difference; 3) number of goals scored.
(C) Champions; (O) Play-off winners; (P) Promoted; (R) Relegated

=== Group 2 ===
Pos	Team	Pld	W	D	L	GF	GA	GD	Pts	Promotion, qualification or relegation
1	Haugesund (C, P)	22	14	5	3	44	21	+23	47	Promotion to Tippeligaen
2	Sogndal (O, P)	22	13	3	6	49	24	+25	42	Qualification for the promotion play-offs
3	Bryne	22	10	5	7	45	41	+4	35	
4	Aalesund	22	9	6	7	32	24	+8	33	
5	Hødd	22	10	2	10	37	38	−1	32	
6	Byåsen (O)	22	9	5	8	34	37	−3	32	Qualification for the relegation play-offs
7	Fana (R)	22	8	7	7	33	31	+2	31	Relegation to Second Division
8	Strindheim (R)	22	9	4	9	36	35	+1	31	Relegation to Second Division
9	Nardo (R)	22	8	4	10	32	36	−4	28	Relegation to Second Division
10	Vidar (R)	22	6	5	11	36	42	−6	23	Relegation to Second Division
11	Åsane (R)	22	5	5	12	33	50	−17	20	Relegation to Second Division
12	Fyllingen (R)	22	3	5	14	28	60	−32	14	Relegation to Second Division

Source: nifs.no
Rules for classification: 1) points; 2) goal difference; 3) number of goals scored.
(C) Champions; (O) Play-off winners; (P) Promoted; (R) Relegated

== Top goalscorers ==
- 21 goals:

Vegard Berg Johansen, Tromsdalen

- 20 goals:

Atle Maurud, Ham Kam

- 15 goals:

Jo Tessem, Lyn
Kristian Klausen, Aalesund

- 15 goals:

Ole Halvor Kolstad, Odd

- 14 goals:

Tommy Nilsen, Lyn
Geir Televik, Hødd

- 11 goals:

Caleb Francis, Bryne
Kjell Sture Jensen, Haugesund
Tom Helge Jacobsen, Eik
Rune Lange, Tromsdalen

== See also ==
- 1996 Tippeligaen
- 1996 2. divisjon
- 1996 3. divisjon
