= 1997 Norwegian Second Division =

Norwegian football league season

The 1997 2. divisjon, the third highest association football league for men in Norway.

22 games were played in 8 groups, with 3 points given for wins and 1 for draws. Kjelsås, Raufoss, Ullern and Strindheim were promoted to the First Division through playoffs against the other 4 group winners. Number ten, eleven and twelve were relegated to the 3. divisjon. The winning teams from each of the 19 groups in the 3. divisjon, plus some number-two teams, were promoted to the 2. divisjon.

== League tables ==
=== Group 1 ===
Pos	Team	Pld	W	D	L	GF	GA	GD	Pts	Promotion or relegation
1	Kjelsås (P)	22	13	6	3	41	17	+24	45	Promotion to First Division
2	Skjetten	22	12	6	4	40	22	+18	42	
3	Lillestrøm 2	22	12	5	5	76	30	+46	41	
4	Fredrikstad	22	10	8	4	41	21	+20	38	
5	Ski	22	10	5	7	58	37	+21	35	
6	Østsiden	22	10	2	10	46	34	+12	32	
7	Råde	22	9	3	10	47	48	−1	30	
8	Strømmen	22	8	4	10	36	40	−4	28	
9	Sprint-Jeløy	22	8	4	10	40	60	−20	28	
10	Lørenskog (Note: Lørenskog survived as the best tenth-place team, since Stålkameratene was removed.)	22	8	2	12	34	50	−16	26	
11	Frigg (R)	22	5	5	12	26	64	−38	20	Relegation to Third Division
12	Selbak (R)	22	0	4	18	14	78	−64	4	Relegation to Third Division

(P) Promoted; (R) Relegated

=== Group 2 ===
Pos	Team	Pld	W	D	L	GF	GA	GD	Pts	Promotion or relegation
1	Raufoss (P)	22	13	6	3	53	27	+26	45	Promotion to First Division
2	Faaberg	22	13	2	7	54	27	+27	41	
3	Grei	22	11	4	7	42	35	+7	37	
4	Liv/Fossekallen	22	10	5	7	43	23	+20	35	
5	Årvoll	22	10	5	7	43	36	+7	35	
6	Elverum	22	10	3	9	48	50	−2	33	
7	Jevnaker	22	8	6	8	37	35	+2	30	
8	Gjøvik-Lyn	22	7	8	7	40	39	+1	29	
9	Ham-Kam 2	22	8	4	10	26	44	−18	28	
10	Eidsvold Turn (R)	22	6	4	12	31	42	−11	22	Relegation to Third Division
11	Mercantile (R)	22	5	6	11	26	50	−24	21	Relegation to Third Division
12	Holter (R)	22	4	1	17	23	58	−35	13	Relegation to Third Division

(P) Promoted; (R) Relegated

=== Group 3 ===
Pos	Team	Pld	W	D	L	GF	GA	GD	Pts	Promotion or relegation
1	Ullern (P)	22	14	5	3	41	17	+24	47	Promotion to First Division
2	Bærum	22	13	5	4	52	30	+22	44	
3	Sandefjord	22	14	1	7	43	30	+13	43	
4	Ørn-Horten	22	12	3	7	56	37	+19	39	
5	Jerv	22	11	6	5	44	26	+18	39	
6	Larvik Turn	22	11	5	6	45	34	+11	38	
7	Pors Grenland	22	11	5	6	38	29	+9	38	
8	Mjøndalen	22	7	5	10	35	32	+3	26	
9	Åssiden	22	5	3	14	30	43	−13	18	
10	Falk (R)	22	4	6	12	22	43	−21	18	Relegation to Third Division
11	Vindbjart (R)	22	4	2	16	15	59	−44	14	Relegation to Third Division
12	Stokke (R)	22	3	0	19	21	62	−41	9	Relegation to Third Division

(P) Promoted; (R) Relegated

=== Group 4 ===
Pos	Team	Pld	W	D	L	GF	GA	GD	Pts	Relegation
1	Vidar	22	16	2	4	60	19	+41	50	
2	Fyllingen	22	15	1	6	64	30	+34	46	
3	Vard Haugesund	22	13	4	5	50	30	+20	43	
4	Randaberg	22	10	4	8	35	32	+3	34	
5	Flekkefjord	22	9	2	11	39	42	−3	29	
6	Eiger	22	8	5	9	26	31	−5	29	
7	Sola	22	8	4	10	39	45	−6	28 (Note: It seems unlikely that Vedavåg and Sola would have an identical record (including goals) but this is how it is printed in the source.)	
8	Vedavåg	22	8	4	10	39	45	−6	28	
9	Ålgård	22	7	6	9	28	31	−3	27	
10	Vigør (R)	22	5	7	10	32	48	−16	22	Relegation to Third Division
11	Viking 2 (R)	22	7	1	14	24	53	−29	22	Relegation to Third Division
12	Kopervik (R)	22	4	4	14	27	53	−26	16	Relegation to Third Division

(R) Relegated

=== Group 5 ===
Pos	Team	Pld	W	D	L	GF	GA	GD	Pts	Relegation
1	Fana	22	18	3	1	56	18	+38	57	
2	Åsane	22	15	3	4	46	21	+25	48	
3	Brann 2	22	10	5	7	47	28	+19	35	
4	Nest-Sotra	22	11	1	10	48	42	+6	34	
5	Volda	22	7	10	5	27	26	+1	31	
6	Stryn	22	8	5	9	37	38	−1	29	
7	Førde	22	8	5	9	32	35	−3	29	
8	Stord	22	6	7	9	28	42	−14	25	
9	Skarbøvik	22	7	3	12	27	44	−17	24	
10	Løv-Ham (R)	22	6	3	13	35	44	−9	21	Relegation to Third Division
11	Trott (R)	22	5	4	13	26	47	−21	19	Relegation to Third Division
12	Ørsta (R)	22	6	1	15	29	53	−24	19	Relegation to Third Division

(R) Relegated

=== Group 6 ===
Pos	Team	Pld	W	D	L	GF	GA	GD	Pts	Relegation
1	Kolstad	22	13	6	3	42	20	+22	45	
2	Nardo	22	11	6	5	40	23	+17	39	
3	Ranheim	22	12	3	7	37	26	+11	39	
4	Abildsø	22	11	4	7	40	34	+6	37	
5	Molde 2	22	9	4	9	45	37	+8	31	
6	Træff	22	8	7	7	46	39	+7	31	
7	Averøykameratene	22	8	7	7	33	33	0	31	
8	Nationalkam	22	7	8	7	42	49	−7	29	
9	Fossum	22	7	5	10	35	40	−5	26	
10	Åndalsnes (Note: Åndalsnes survived as the second best tenth-place team, since Narvik/Nor was disestablished.)	22	6	7	9	28	30	−2	25	
11	Orkanger (R)	22	4	5	13	31	52	−21	17	Relegation to Third Division
12	Nidelv (R)	22	4	2	16	22	58	−36	14	Relegation to Third Division

(R) Relegated

=== Group 7 ===
Pos	Team	Pld	W	D	L	GF	GA	GD	Pts	Promotion or relegation
1	Strindheim (P)	22	17	0	5	80	29	+51	51	Promotion to First Division
2	Rosenborg 2	22	15	1	6	79	28	+51	46	
3	Verdal	22	14	0	8	44	31	+13	42	
4	Mosjøen	22	12	5	5	50	32	+18	41	
5	Stålkameratene (Note: Stålkameratene was forcibly relegated for cheating by using ineligible players.) (R)	22	13	1	8	56	39	+17	40	Relegation to Third Division
6	Gevir Bodø	22	9	6	7	68	38	+30	33	
7	Steinkjer	22	10	3	9	42	46	−4	33	
8	Stjørdals-Blink	22	9	5	8	47	52	−5	32	
9	Mo	22	9	1	12	55	46	+9	28	
10	Namsos (R)	22	5	4	13	43	70	−27	19	Relegation to Third Division
11	Sandnessjøen (R)	22	2	2	18	33	113	−80	8	Relegation to Third Division
12	Fauske/Sprint (R)	22	1	4	17	25	98	−73	7	Relegation to Third Division

(P) Promoted; (R) Relegated

=== Group 8 ===
Pos	Team	Pld	W	D	L	GF	GA	GD	Pts	Relegation
1	Lofoten	22	17	3	2	66	25	+41	54	
2	Tromsdalen	22	14	4	4	69	28	+41	46	
3	Finnsnes	22	13	1	8	62	34	+28	40	
4	Skjervøy	22	12	4	6	54	35	+19	40	
5	Alta	22	11	4	7	66	44	+22	37	
6	Mjølner-Narvik	22	11	2	9	65	39	+26	35	
7	Narvik/Nor (R)	22	10	4	8	48	52	−4	34	Merged (Note: Narvik/Nor ceased to exist after the season because of a merger.)
8	Silsand/Omegn	22	9	5	8	46	38	+8	32	
9	Polarstjernen	22	7	5	10	40	71	−31	26	
10	Sortland (R)	22	5	1	16	35	56	−21	16	Relegation to Third Division
11	Porsanger (R)	22	2	4	16	26	63	−37	10	Relegation to Third Division
12	Tromsø 2 (R)	22	1	3	18	28	120	−92	6	Relegation to Third Division

(R) Relegated
