= 1996 Norwegian Second Division =

Football League of Norway

The 1996 2. divisjon, the third highest association football league for men in Norway.

22 games were played in 6 groups, with 3 points given for wins and 1 for draws. Sarpsborg and Runar were promoted to the First Division through playoffs against the other 3 group winners as well as two teams (who both survived) from the First Division. Number eleven and twelve were relegated to the 3. divisjon. The winning teams from each of the 19 groups in the 3. divisjon, plus many number-two teams, were promoted to the 2. divisjon (this was possible because of an enlargement of the 2. divisjon from 6 to 8 groups).

== League tables ==
=== Group 1 ===
Pos	Team	Pld	W	D	L	GF	GA	GD	Pts	Promotion or relegation
1	Sarpsborg (P)	22	15	2	5	51	35	+16	47	Promotion to First Division
2	Bærum	22	12	5	5	52	29	+23	41	
3	Fredrikstad	22	10	6	6	35	23	+12	36	
4	Ski	22	9	8	5	47	25	+22	35	
5	Frigg	22	10	2	10	39	45	−6	32	
6	Ham-Kam 2	22	9	3	10	42	41	+1	30	
7	Faaberg	22	9	3	10	32	43	−11	30	
8	Selbak	22	7	6	9	27	43	−16	27	
9	Raufoss	22	6	7	9	33	35	−2	25	
10	Fossum	22	6	7	9	33	35	−2	25	
11	Nybergsund (R)	22	4	7	11	29	40	−11	19	Relegation to Third Division
12	Rakkestad (R)	22	5	4	13	29	45	−16	19	Relegation to Third Division

(P) Promoted; (R) Relegated

=== Group 2 ===
Pos	Team	Pld	W	D	L	GF	GA	GD	Pts	Relegation
1	Skjetten	22	11	6	5	47	34	+13	39	
2	Ørsta	22	11	5	6	34	26	+8	38	
3	Stryn	22	12	2	8	37	34	+3	38	
4	Løv-Ham	22	9	5	8	34	36	−2	32	
5	Skarbøvik	22	9	5	8	33	36	−3	32	
6	Lillestrøm 2	22	9	4	9	42	38	+4	31	
7	Nest-Sotra	22	9	4	9	31	37	−6	31	
8	Stord	22	8	6	8	36	34	+2	30	
9	Åssiden	22	8	6	8	34	32	+2	30	
10	Liv/Fossekallen	22	8	4	10	36	32	+4	28	
11	Os (R)	22	8	3	11	27	31	−4	27	Relegation to Third Division
12	Brattvåg (R)	22	4	2	16	27	48	−21	14	Relegation to Third Division

(R) Relegated

=== Group 3 ===
Pos	Team	Pld	W	D	L	GF	GA	GD	Pts	Promotion or relegation
1	Runar (P)	22	14	4	4	60	29	+31	46	Promotion to First Division
2	Ørn-Horten	22	12	6	4	38	24	+14	42	
3	Strømmen	22	10	7	5	40	27	+13	37	
4	Abildsø	22	9	6	7	41	41	0	33	
5	Holter	22	10	2	10	56	44	+12	32	
6	Kjelsås	22	9	3	10	34	34	0	30	
7	Sandefjord	22	9	3	10	30	37	−7	30	
8	Pors Grenland	22	8	5	9	40	50	−10	29	
9	Falk	22	6	8	8	44	42	+2	26	
10	Grei	22	8	2	12	30	43	−13	26	
11	Teie (R)	22	5	5	12	27	52	−25	20	Relegation to Third Division
12	Start 2 (R)	22	5	3	14	35	52	−17	18	Relegation to Third Division

(P) Promoted; (R) Relegated

=== Group 4 ===
Pos	Team	Pld	W	D	L	GF	GA	GD	Pts	Relegation
1	Vigør	22	15	3	4	48	24	+24	48	
2	Eiger	22	13	6	3	41	24	+17	45	
3	Vard Haugesund	22	13	4	5	42	26	+16	43	
4	Vedavåg	22	9	6	7	48	36	+12	33	
5	Flekkefjord	22	7	9	6	36	32	+4	30	
6	Randaberg	22	8	4	10	33	41	−8	28	
7	Viking 2	22	7	6	9	45	35	+10	27	
8	Ålgård	22	8	3	11	36	43	−7	27	
9	Kopervik	22	6	8	8	27	41	−14	26	
10	Vindbjart	22	7	4	11	34	36	−2	25	
11	Hana (R)	22	5	6	11	19	37	−18	21	Relegation to Third Division
12	Klepp (R)	22	2	5	15	25	59	−34	11	Relegation to Third Division

(R) Relegated

=== Group 5 ===
Pos	Team	Pld	W	D	L	GF	GA	GD	Pts	Relegation
1	Rosenborg 2	22	13	5	4	53	24	+29	44	
2	Verdal	22	12	2	8	39	21	+18	38	
3	Stjørdals-Blink	22	12	2	8	45	33	+12	38	
4	Steinkjer	22	12	2	8	44	34	+10	38	
5	Orkanger	22	10	3	9	42	51	−9	33	
6	Kolstad	22	9	4	9	41	36	+5	31	
7	Molde 2	22	8	3	11	35	29	+6	27	
8	Nationalkam	22	6	9	7	32	32	0	27	
9	Åndalsnes	22	7	4	11	32	40	−8	25	
10	Namsos	22	7	4	11	32	55	−23	25	
11	Orkdal (R)	22	7	3	12	28	53	−25	24	Relegation to Third Division
12	Melhus (R)	22	6	5	11	27	42	−15	23	Relegation to Third Division

(R) Relegated

=== Group 6 ===
Pos	Team	Pld	W	D	L	GF	GA	GD	Pts	Relegation
1	Finnsnes	22	16	2	4	68	27	+41	50	
2	Gevir Bodø	22	15	3	4	71	23	+48	48	
3	Skjervøy	22	13	5	4	56	24	+32	44	
4	Silsand/Omegn	22	12	4	6	56	32	+24	40	
5	Mjølner-Narvik	22	12	3	7	50	27	+23	39	
6	Alta	22	11	5	6	41	36	+5	38	
7	Sandnessjøen	22	9	2	11	45	53	−8	29	
8	Fauske/Sprint	22	8	4	10	43	51	−8	28	
9	Porsanger	22	7	6	9	33	42	−9	27	
10	Sortland	22	4	3	15	31	71	−40	15	
11	Morild (R)	22	4	2	16	23	59	−36	14	Relegation to Third Division
12	Grovfjord (R)	22	1	1	20	21	93	−72	4	Relegation to Third Division

(R) Relegated
