= 2002 Norwegian Second Division =

Norwegian football league season

The 2002 season of the 2. divisjon, the third highest football league for men in Norway.

26 games were played in 4 groups, with 3 points given for wins and 1 for draws. Fredrikstad, Bærum, Mandalskameratene and Alta were promoted to the 1. divisjon. Number twelve, thirteen and fourteen were relegated to the 3. divisjon. The winning teams from each of the 24 groups in the 3. divisjon each faced a winning team from another group in a playoff match, resulting in 12 playoff winners which were promoted to the 2. divisjon.

== League tables ==
=== Group 1 ===
Pos	Team	Pld	W	D	L	GF	GA	GD	Pts	Promotion or relegation
1	Fredrikstad (P)	26	20	3	3	99	28	+71	63	Promotion to First Division
2	Kvik Halden	26	15	7	4	65	38	+27	52	
3	Follo	26	13	5	8	51	42	+9	44	
4	Nybergsund	26	12	4	10	41	47	−6	40	
5	Ullensaker/Kisa	26	12	3	11	47	45	+2	39	
6	Romerike Fotball	26	10	7	9	54	45	+9	37	
7	Kongsvinger	26	11	4	11	36	31	+5	37	
8	Stabæk 2	26	11	4	11	50	49	+1	37	
9	FF Lillehammer	26	10	5	11	52	57	−5	35	
10	Sprint-Jeløy	26	10	4	12	54	61	−7	34	
11	Eidsvold Turn	26	9	6	11	45	48	−3	33	
12	Elverum (R)	26	8	5	13	43	48	−5	29	Relegation to Third Division
13	Lyn 2 (R)	26	6	6	14	36	64	−28	24	Relegation to Third Division
14	Grindvoll (R)	26	3	1	22	27	97	−70	10	Relegation to Third Division

Source: RSSSF
(P) Promoted; (R) Relegated

=== Group 2 ===
Pos	Team	Pld	W	D	L	GF	GA	GD	Pts	Promotion or relegation
1	Bærum (P)	26	17	6	3	78	37	+41	57	Promotion to First Division
2	FK Tønsberg	26	16	6	4	76	28	+48	54	
3	Pors Grenland	26	13	9	4	63	33	+30	48	
4	Molde 2	26	13	6	7	56	40	+16	45	
5	Strindheim	26	11	11	4	62	36	+26	44	
6	Kjelsås	26	13	5	8	46	30	+16	44	
7	Skarbøvik	26	11	7	8	41	39	+2	40	
8	Larvik Fotball	26	9	7	10	41	40	+1	34	
9	Frigg	26	9	7	10	33	42	−9	34	
10	Langevåg	26	5	9	12	27	45	−18	24	
11	Clausenengen	26	5	7	14	27	62	−35	22	
12	Verdal (R)	26	6	3	17	35	67	−32	21	Relegation to Third Division
13	Træff (R)	26	5	3	18	28	72	−44	18	Relegation to Third Division
14	Spjelkavik (R)	26	4	4	18	28	70	−42	16	Relegation to Third Division

Source: RSSSF
(P) Promoted; (R) Relegated

=== Group 3 ===
Pos	Team	Pld	W	D	L	GF	GA	GD	Pts	Promotion or relegation
1	Mandalskameratene (P)	26	18	7	1	69	19	+50	61	Promotion to First Division
2	Løv-Ham	26	18	5	3	62	28	+34	59	
3	Fyllingen	26	14	4	8	65	63	+2	46	
4	Vard Haugesund	26	12	7	7	66	40	+26	43	
5	Fana	26	12	4	10	48	46	+2	40	
6	Nest-Sotra	25	12	2	11	48	63	−15	38	
7	Brann 2	26	10	5	11	48	53	−5	35	
8	Viking 2	26	9	5	12	59	53	+6	32	
9	Vidar	26	9	4	13	44	54	−10	31	
10	Klepp	26	9	3	14	65	68	−3	30	
11	Jerv	26	9	3	14	47	59	−12	30	
12	Tornado (R)	26	9	3	14	46	68	−22	30	Relegation to Third Division
13	Nord (R)	26	8	3	15	37	63	−26	27	Relegation to Third Division
14	Førde (R)	26	3	5	18	39	66	−27	14	Relegation to Third Division

Source: RSSSF
(P) Promoted; (R) Relegated

=== Group 4 ===
Pos	Team	Pld	W	D	L	GF	GA	GD	Pts	Promotion or relegation
1	Alta (P)	26	18	2	6	79	38	+41	56	Promotion to First Division
2	Byåsen	26	17	5	4	79	44	+35	56	
3	Rosenborg 2	26	15	6	5	83	40	+43	51	
4	Levanger	26	12	5	9	69	45	+24	41	
5	Lofoten	26	11	8	7	53	41	+12	41	
6	Mo	26	11	3	12	47	49	−2	36	
7	Steinkjer	26	10	2	14	53	60	−7	32	
8	Skjervøy	26	9	4	13	44	69	−25	31	
9	Skarp	26	8	6	12	62	68	−6	30	
10	Hammerfest	26	7	9	10	52	58	−6	30	
11	Vesterålen	26	9	3	14	45	65	−20	30	
12	Harstad (R)	26	9	2	15	45	64	−19	29	Relegation to Third Division
13	Salangen (R)	26	9	2	15	40	79	−39	29	Relegation to Third Division
14	Stålkameratene (R)	26	7	3	16	39	70	−31	24	Relegation to Third Division

Source: RSSSF
(P) Promoted; (R) Relegated

== Top goalscorers ==
=== Group 1 ===
31 goals

- Lars Petter Hansen, Fredrikstad
- (Sweden) Markus Ringberg, Fredrikstad

22 goals

- Øystein Rogstad, Kvik Halden

15 goals

- Caleb Francis, Ull/Kisa
- Kjell Roar Kaasa, Follo

14 goals

- Einar Kalsæg, Eidsvold Turn
- Oddmund Vaagsholm, Follo

13 goals

- André Bjerke, Romerike

(incomplete)

=== Group 2 ===
16 goals

- Kim Nysted, Bærum

15 goals

- Simen Fossum, Bærum

(incomplete)

=== Group 3 ===
20 goals

- Kjell Sture Jensen, Vard

19 goals

- Jarle Wee, Vard

14 goals

- Henrik Nyhus, Mandalskameratene

(incomplete)

=== Group 4 ===
28 goals

- Vegard Alstad Sunde, Levanger

20 goals

- Svein Hugo Vian, Alta

18 goals

- Torstein Vassdal, Mo

17 goals

- Morten Giæver, Skarp

15 goals

- Arne Winsnes, Byåsen

14 goals

- Tom Erik Sørum, Byåsen
- Are Tronseth, Rosenborg 2

13 goals

- Fred-Jøran Johansen, Skjervøy
