= Play-offs to the Norwegian First Division =

Norwegian football league play-offs

The Playoffs to the 1. divisjon in Norwegian association football took place from 1996 up to and including the 2000 season.

The playoffs were instituted because of the streamlining of the 1. divisjon ahead of the 1997 season. It was reduced from two groups to one, and thus, not all winners of the 2. divisjon groups could be promoted.

From the 2001 season, the 2. divisjon got four groups instead of eight, meaning that each of the four group winners was promoted.

A playoff system was re-introduced in the 2017 Norwegian Second Division season. The winners of the two groups are automatically promoted to First Division, while the 2nd-placed teams enter the playoff. The two 2nd-placed teams play a double leg, the winner of which plays against the 14th-placed team in the First Division, the winner of which gets promoted to or stays in First Division.

== 2024 ==
=== Round 1 ===
3 November 2024
14:00 CET

Tromsdalen	0–1	Jerv
	Report	Wilson 51'

TUIL Arena, Tromsø
Attendance: 664
Referee: Jørgen Haugen
9 November 2024
16:00 CET

Jerv	2–1	Tromsdalen
Seufert 41' (pen.); Wilson 69'	Report	Hafstad 73'

Levermyr Stadion, Grimstad
Attendance: 1,567
Referee: Magnus Nicolai Koløy

Jerv won 3–1 on aggregate.

=== Round 2 ===
24 November 2024
18:00 CET

Mjøndalen	2–1	Jerv
Bringaker 77'; Solberg 90+5'	Report	Furaha 31'

Consto Arena, Mjøndalen
Attendance: 1,422
Referee: Stian Røvig Sletner
30 November 2024
17:00 CET

Jerv	1–3	Mjøndalen
Furaha 64'	Report	Conteh 34'; Bringaker 49'; Brenden 72'

Levermyr Stadion, Grimstad
Attendance: 2,012
Referee: Mischa Huru Kellerhals

Mjøndalen won 5–2 on aggregate and remained in First Division for the 2025 Norwegian First Division season.

== 2023 ==
=== Round 1 ===
15 November 2023
18:00 CET

Lyn	1–2	Tromsdalen
Breistøl 53'	Report	Hafstad 65'; Sandbukt 83'

Nadderud Stadion, Bærum
Attendance: 2,167
Referee: Ali al Hatam
19 November 2023
15:00 CET

Tromsdalen	0–2	Lyn
	Report	Olsen 1', 40'

TUIL Arena, Tromsø
Attendance: 1,275
Referee: Mathias Støfringshaug

Lyn won 3–2 on aggregate.

=== Round 2 ===
27 November 2023
18:00 CET

Lyn	3–0	Hødd
Olsen 17'; Kristiansen 46'; Breistøl 60'	Report

Nadderud Stadion, Bærum
Attendance: 2,500
Referee: Eivind Bodding
2 December 2023
15:00 CET

Hødd	1–2	Lyn
Skeide 38'	Report	Breistøl 9'; Elvevold 88'

Color Line Stadion, Ålesund
Attendance: 628
Referee: Steinar Hauge

Lyn won 5–1 on aggregate and qualified for the 2024 Norwegian First Division.

== 2022 ==
=== Round 1 ===
26 October 2022
18:00 CEST

Arendal	0–1	Ull/Kisa
	Report	Byttingsvik 29' (o.g.)

Norac Stadion, Arendal
Attendance: 812
Referee: Daniel Higraff
29 October 2022
15:00 CEST

Ull/Kisa	0–3	Arendal
	Report	Jenssen 4' (o.g.); Christensen 56'; Bergan 64'

Jessheim Stadion, Jessheim
Attendance: 942
Referee: Harald Vollstad Sletner

Arendal won 3–1 on aggregate.

=== Round 2 ===
2 November 2022
14:00 CET

Skeid	6–0	Arendal
Buduson 3', 43'; Hoven 54'; Romsaas 56'; Effiom 67', 80'	Report

Nordre Åsen, Oslo
Attendance: 552
Referee: Steinar Hauge
5 November 2022
14:00 CET

Arendal	1–2	Skeid
Johansen 79'	Report	Nordengen 61'; Buduson 83'

Norac Stadion, Arendal
Attendance: 519
Referee: Marius Lien

Skeid won 8–1 on aggregate and remained in First Division for the 2023 Norwegian First Division season.

== 2021 ==
=== Round 1 ===
20 November 2021
16:00 CET

Hødd	2–1	Arendal
Hjelmeseth 22'; Bruun-Hanssen 59'	Report	Meinseth 74'

Høddvoll, Ulsteinvik
Attendance: 954
Referee: Magnus Nicolai Koløy
27 November 2021
15:00 CET

Arendal	2–2	Hødd
Johansen 20'; Hellum 45' (pen.)	Report	Wrele 13'; Løken 62'

Norac Stadion, Arendal
Attendance: 1,274
Referee: Ajdin Medic

Hødd won 4–3 on aggregate.

=== Round 2 ===
1 December 2021
19:00 CET

Hødd	3–2	Stjørdals-Blink
Skeide 38'; Wrele 43'; Saunes 63'	Report	Bjørnholm-Jatta 7'; Lillebo 76'

Høddvoll, Ulsteinvik
Attendance: 803
Referee: Daniel Higraff
4 December 2021
16:00 CET

Stjørdals-Blink	3–0	Hødd
Bjørnholm-Jatta 4'; Lillebo 10', 75'	Report

M.U.S Stadion, Stjørdalshalsen
Attendance: 618
Referee: Steinar Hauge

Stjørdals-Blink won 5–3 on aggregate and remained in First Division for the 2022 Norwegian First Division season.

== 2019 ==
=== Round 1 ===
2 November 2019
14:00 CET (UTC+1)

Åsane	2–0	Kvik Halden
Fredriksen 63'; Stava 75'	Report

Myrdal Stadion, Bergen
Attendance: 305
Referee: Daniel Higraff
9 November 2019
13:00 CET (UTC+1)

Kvik Halden	1–2	Åsane
Krans 48'	Report	Hammersland 5', 74'

Halden Stadion, Halden
Attendance: 633
Referee: Marius Lien

Åsane won 4–1 on aggregate.

=== Round 2 ===
21 November 2019
19:00 CET (UTC+1)

Notodden	1–3	Åsane
Tagbajumi 21'	Report	Nygard 23'; Hammersland 34', 54'

Idrettsparken, Notodden
Attendance: 468
24 November 2019
14:00 CET (UTC+1)

Åsane	2–2	Notodden
Hammersland 20', 80'	Report	Bakke 6'; Gustavsen 25'

Myrdal Stadion, Bergen
Attendance: 802

Åsane won 5–3 on aggregate and was promoted to the 2020 Norwegian First Division.

== 2018 ==
=== Round 1 ===
3 November 2018
14:00 CET

KFUM Oslo	3–0	Fredrikstad
Mawa 39'; Sørås 49'; Gueye 88'	Summary

KFUM Arena, Oslo
Attendance: 1,436
Referee: Christian Moen
10 November 2018
17:00 CET

Fredrikstad	1–1	KFUM Oslo
Aalbu 80'	Summary	Stavrum 88'

Fredrikstad Stadion, Fredrikstad
Attendance: 2,116
Referee: Sivert Øksnes Amland

KFUM Oslo won 4–1 on aggregate.

=== Round 2 ===
17 November 2018
13:00 CET (UTC+1)

KFUM Oslo	1–2	Åsane
Larsen 54'	Summary	Huseklepp 74'; Ogungbaro 85'

KFUM Arena, Oslo
Referee: Marius Lien
25 November 2018
13:00 CET (UTC+1)

Åsane	1–3	KFUM Oslo
Bruun-Hanssen 17'	Summary	Larsen 58'; Mawa 73'; Sortevik 81'

Myrdal Gress, Bergen
Attendance: 925
Referee: Mohammad Usman Aslam

KFUM Oslo won 4–3 on aggregate and was promoted to the 2019 Norwegian First Division.

== 2017 ==
=== Round 1 ===
28 October 2017
16:00 CEST

Raufoss	2–1	Notodden
Nilsen 25'; Hjelmtvedt 53'	Summary	Mbedule 88'

Nammo Stadion, Raufoss
Attendance: 1,070
Referee: Mads Følstad Skarsem
4 November 2017
16:00 CET

Notodden	2–1 (a.e.t.)	Raufoss
Midtgarden 42' (pen.); Johansen 53'	Summary	Senstad 90'
Penalties
Midtgarden (penalty scored); Bakke (penalty scored); Tähti (penalty scored); Johansen (penalty scored); Hustad (penalty scored)	5–4	(penalty scored) Senstad; (penalty scored) Henningsson; (penalty scored) Alm; (penalty missed) Lauvli; (penalty scored) Onsrud

Idrettsparken, Notodden
Attendance: 1,277
Referee: Jan Morten Tennøy

3–3 on aggregate. Notodden won 5–4 on penalties.

=== Round 2 ===
12 November 2017
18:00 CET (UTC+1)

Fredrikstad	0–0	Notodden
	Summary

Fredrikstad Stadion, Fredrikstad
Attendance: 5,340
Referee: Christian Moen
18 November 2017
18:00 CET (UTC+1)

Notodden	5–3	Fredrikstad
Hustad 7'; Jenssen 22'; Holmen 24'; Mbedule 28'; Midtgarden 69'	Summary	Kapidžić 38'; Leko 76', 83'

Idrettsparken, Notodden
Attendance: 2,105
Referee: Torkjell Trædal

Notodden won 5–3 on aggregate and was promoted to the 2018 Norwegian First Division.

== 2000 ==
- Mandalskameratene beat Lofoten 5–2 on aggregate
- Ørn-Horten beat FF Lillehammer on the away goals rule; 3–3 on aggregate
- Hødd beat Stålkameratene 7–2 on aggregate
- Aalesund beat Skjetten 2–1 on aggregate

- Reference: RSSSF

== 1999 ==
- Strindheim beat Asker 3–2 on aggregate
- Sandefjord beat Fyllingen on the away goals rule; 4–4 on aggregate
- Hamarkameratene beat Vidar 4–3 on aggregate
- Tromsdalen beat Aalesund after extra time; 5–4 on aggregate

- Reference: RSSSF

== 1998 ==
- Liv/Fossekallen beat Fyllingen 6–2 on aggregate
- Skjetten beat Ørn-Horten 5–4 on aggregate
- Clausenengen beat Mo 6–2 on aggregate
- Lofoten beat Vidar 4–3 on aggregate

== 1997 ==
- Kjelsås beat Vidar on the away goals rule; 3–3 on aggregate
- Raufoss beat Kolstad 5–3 on aggregate
- Strindheim beat Fana 4–3 on aggregate
- Ullern beat Lofoten 4–2 on aggregate

- Reference: "Fotball: Kvalifisering til 1. divisjon menn" (in Norwegian). Norwegian News Agency. 11 October 1997.

== 1996 ==
The two number-six-teams from the two groups in the First Division, Byåsen and Harstad, were up for playoff.

- Byåsen beat Vigør 8–1 on aggregate
- Harstad beat Verdal 4–1 on aggregate
- Runar beat Skjetten 6–4 on aggregate
- Sarpsborg beat Finnsnes 3–2 on aggregate

- Reference: RSSSF
