= Byåsen Toppfotball =

Norwegian sports club

- Full name: Byåsen Toppfotball
- Nickname: BTF
- Founded: 30 October 1921; 104 years ago
- Stadium: Byåsen Arena
- Capacity: 1500
- Chairman: Anders Lian
- Coach: Christian Sæther Moen
- League: 3. divisjon
- 2024: 3. divisjon Group 4, 10th of 14
- Website: https://www.byasenfotball.no/
Home colours	Away colours

Byåsen Toppfotball is a Norwegian football club based in Trondheim and a section of the multi-sport organization Byåsen IL. Byåsen are currently playing in the 3. divisjon, the fourth tier of the Norwegian football league system, having last played in the 2. divisjon in 2019.

== History ==
Byåsen was promoted to the 1. divisjon in 1995, and with Jan Halvor Halvorsen as coach they were positioned in the top of the second tier in the late 1990s. The closest Byåsen came to win promotion to the top division was in 1998 when they started the season with seven league-victories in a row and a goaldifference of 19–4. Unfortunately for Byåsen, they finished the season with three losses in a row and was one point behind third-placed Kjelsås, which played promotion play-off against Kongsvinger.

In 1999, Byåsen was docked three points by NFF due to economic difficulties, and during the next two seasons the struggle continued until they were relegated to the 2. divisjon in 2001, where they are still playing.

== Recent history ==
Season	Division	Pos.	Pl.	W	D	L	GS	GA	P	Cup	Notes
2002	2. divisjon	4	26	17	5	4	79	44	56	Third round	
2003	2. divisjon	4	26	15	1	10	54	45	46	Third round	
2004	2. divisjon	5	26	12	4	10	48	45	40	Second round	
2005	2. divisjon	7	26	13	3	10	69	44	42	Third round	
2006	2. divisjon	6	26	12	2	12	65	48	38	Second round	
2007	2. divisjon	8	26	10	5	11	47	41	35	Second round	
2008	2. divisjon	7	26	11	5	10	55	51	38	First round	
2009	2. divisjon	6	26	11	7	8	52	38	40	Second round	
2010	2. divisjon	11	26	8	7	11	40	60	27	Second round	
2011	2. divisjon	3	26	12	8	6	65	48	44	Third round	
2012	2. divisjon	4	26	14	5	7	57	47	47	Third round	
2013	2. divisjon	5	26	12	4	10	52	44	40	Second round	
2014	2. divisjon	2	26	16	5	5	64	40	53	Second round	
2015	2. divisjon	5	26	12	4	10	35	42	40	Second round	
2016	2. divisjon	6	26	12	4	10	44	49	40	Second round	
2017	2. divisjon	↓ 14	26	3	4	19	22	52	13	Second round	Relegated to the 3. divisjon
2018	3. divisjon	↑ 1	26	18	4	4	66	25	58	First round	Promoted to the 2. divisjon
2019	2. divisjon	↓ 14	26	4	5	17	28	63	17	First round	Relegated to the 3. divisjon
2020	Season cancelled										
2021	3. divisjon	6	13	5	4	4	23	20	19	First round	
2022	3. divisjon	2	26	19	2	5	84	25	59	Third round	
