= Kjetil Wæhler =

Norwegian footballer (born 1976)

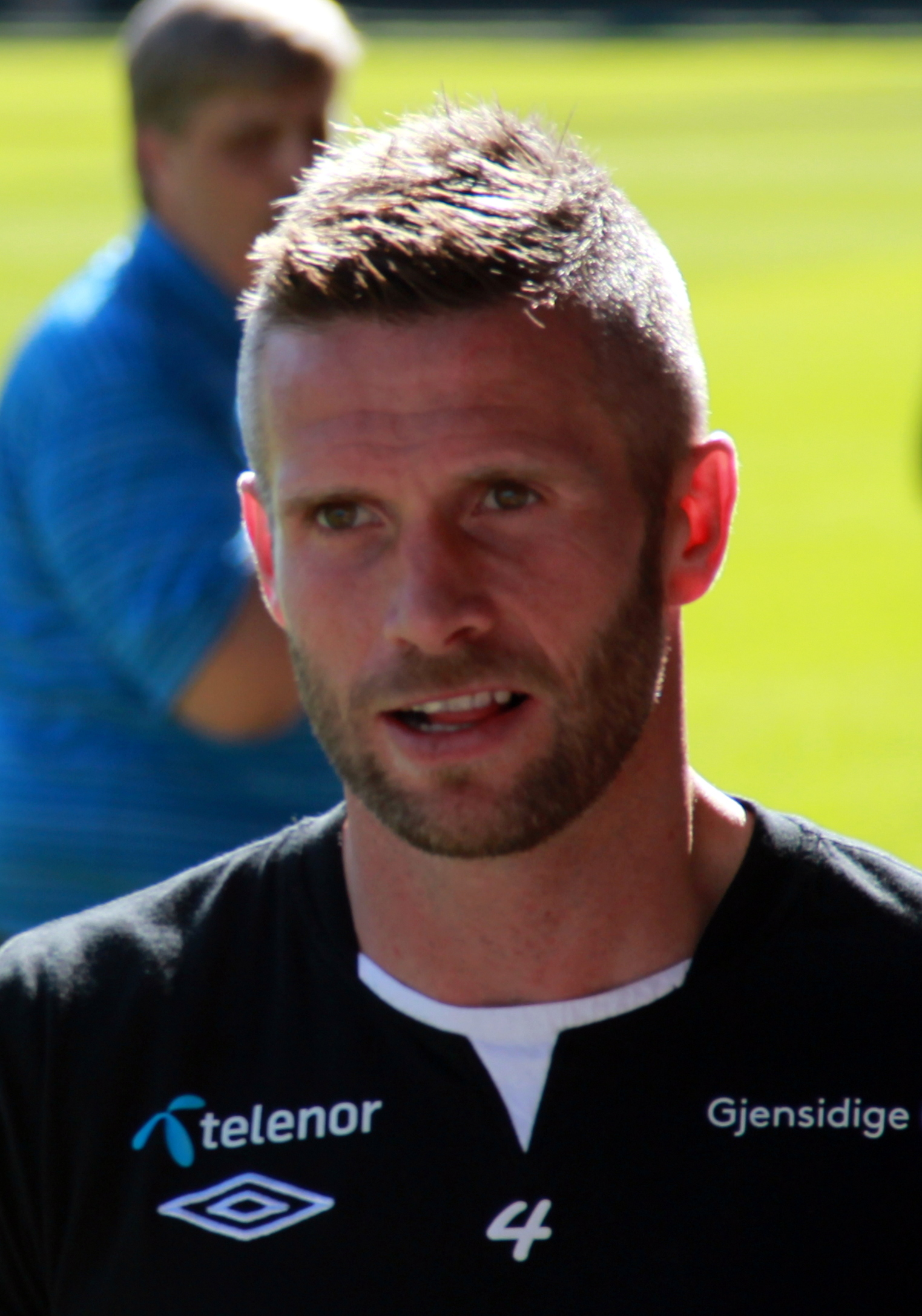
- Wæhler in 2013

Personal information
- Full name: Kjetil Wæhler
- Date of birth: 16 March 1976 (age 50)
- Place of birth: Oslo, Norway
- Height: 1.82 m (5 ft 11 1/2 in)
- Position: Centre back

Youth career
- –1988: Frigg Oslo FK
- 1989–1994: FK Lyn

Senior career*
Years	Team	Apps	(Gls)
1994–1999	FK Lyn	111	(9)
1999–2002	Wimbledon	0	(0)
2002	→ Moss FK (loan)	11	(1)
2003–2008	Vålerenga	124	(5)
2009–2012	AaB	83	(3)
2012–2014	IFK Göteborg	63	(3)
2015–2017	Vålerenga	46	(3)
2017–2018	Sogndal	32	(3)
Total		470	(27)

International career
1996	Norway U21	8	(0)
2005–2013	Norway	32	(1)
- * Club domestic league appearances and goals

Kjetil Wæhler (born 16 March 1976) is a Norwegian footballer who plays as a centre back.

Wæhler is currently without a club.

== International career ==
As of December 2013, Kjetil Wæhler has been capped 32 times for Norway, scoring one goal. He made his debut against Switzerland on 17 August 2005. His first, and so far only, international goal came against South Africa, in a friendly match on 10 October 2009, a game Norway won 1–0.

== Career statistics ==
=== Club ===
As of 7 October 2018

Club	Season	League		Cup		Continental		Total	
Club	Season	Apps	Goals	Apps	Goals	Apps	Goals	Apps	Goals
FK Lyn	1994	0	0	0	0	—		0	0
FK Lyn	1995	0	0	0	0	—		0	0
FK Lyn	1996	12	0	0	0	—		12	0
FK Lyn	1997	26	3	0	0	—		26	3
FK Lyn	1998	23	3	0	0	—		23	3
FK Lyn	1999	22	1	0	0	—		22	1
FK Lyn	Total	111	9	0	0	0	0	111	9
Wimbledon	1999–00	0	0	0	0	—		0	0
Wimbledon	2000–01	0	0	0	0	—		0	0
Wimbledon	2001–02	0	0	0	0	—		0	0
Wimbledon	Total	0	0	0	0	0	0	0	0
Moss FK	2002	11	1	2	0	—		13	1
Moss FK	Total	11	1	2	0	0	0	13	1
Vålerenga	2003	23	0	2	1	2	0	27	1
Vålerenga	2004	23	1	2	0	1	0	26	1
Vålerenga	2005	21	1	3	1	4	1	28	3
Vålerenga	2006	16	1	2	0	1	0	19	1
Vålerenga	2007	21	1	3	1	2	0	26	2
Vålerenga	2008	20	1	4	0	—		24	1
Vålerenga	Total	124	5	16	3	10	1	150	9
AaB	2008–09	9	0	3	0	2	0	14	0
AaB	2009–10	27	1	1	0	0	0	28	1
AaB	2010–11	32	2	1	0	—		33	2
AaB	2011–12	15	0	0	0	—		15	0
AaB	Total	83	3	5	0	2	0	90	3
IFK Göteborg	2012	24	0	0	0	—		24	0
IFK Göteborg	2013	20	2	7	0	0	0	27	2
IFK Göteborg	2014	19	1	4	2	2	0	25	3
IFK Göteborg	Total	63	3	11	2	2	0	76	5
Vålerenga	2015	25	2	0	0	—		25	2
Vålerenga	2016	21	1	2	0	—		23	1
Vålerenga	Total	46	3	2	0	0	0	48	3
Sogndal	2017	17	1	0	0	—		17	1
Sogndal	2018	15	2	0	0	—		15	2
Sogndal	Total	32	3	0	0	0	0	32	3
Career total		470	27	36	5	14	1	520	33

=== International ===
As of 11 June 2013

National team	Year	Apps	Goals
Norway	2005	1	0
Norway	2006	1	0
Norway	2007	1	0
Norway	2008	2	0
Norway	2009	7	1
Norway	2010	9	0
Norway	2011	8	0
Norway	2012	2	0
Norway	2013	1	0
Total		32	1

=== International goals ===
#	Date	Venue	Opponent	Score	Result	Competition
1.	10 October 2009	Ullevaal Stadion, Oslo	South Africa	1–0	1–0	Friendly

== Honours ==
=== Club ===
FK Lyn

- Norwegian First Division: 1996

Vålerenga

- Tippeligaen: 2005
- Norwegian Football Cup: 2008

IFK Göteborg

- Svenska Cupen: 2012–13
