= Maurud =

Maurud is a Norwegian surname. Notable people with the surname include:

- Atle Maurud (born 1970), Norwegian footballer
- Jørn Sigurd Maurud (born 1960), Norwegian jurist

== See also ==
- Maurus (disambiguation)
