= Anders Nordstad =

Norwegian footballer (born 1964)

Personal information
- Date of birth: 14 August 1964 (age 62)
- Position: Midfielder

Youth career
- Asker

Senior career*
Years	Team	Apps	(Gls)
–1983	Frigg		
1984–1986	Bærum		
1986–1992	VfR Mannheim		
1992–1995	Stabæk	61	(8)
- * Club domestic league appearances and goals

Anders Nordstad (born 14 August 1964) is a Norwegian pundit on agricultural and food policy. He is also a retired footballer who played as a midfielder.

He played junior football for Asker and senior football for Frigg and Bærum, joining the latter club in 1984. Moving to Mannheim to study business administration, he featured for third-tier club VfR Mannheim. After six years in Germany, he returned to Norway in the summer of 1992 and trained with Bærum and Stabæk. He chose to sign for Stabæk, securing promotions from 1993 2. divisjon and 1994 1. divisjon. In the 1995 Tippeligaen, he played seven league games before retiring.

He worked as a grain and soy trader, among others in Lantmännen and Denofa. From 2021 to 2022 he was the secretary-general of the Norwegian Farmers and Smallholders Union. After leaving, he started as a blogger and public speaker on agrarian policy and food security. He won the award Årets formidler in 2022 and the Beredskapsprisen for 2023.
