= 1998 Norwegian First Division =

1. divisjon
- Season: 1998
- Dates: 19 April – 18 October
- Champions: Odd Grenland
- Promoted: Odd Grenland; Skeid
- Relegated: Aalesund; Strindheim; Ullern; Ham-Kam
- Matches played: 182
- Goals scored: 536 (2.95 per match)
- Top goalscorer: Caleb Francis (18 goals)

The 1998 1. divisjon, Norway's second-tier football league, began play on 19 April 1998 and ended on 18 October 1998. The league was contested by 14 teams, and the top two teams won promotion to Tippeligaen, while the third placed played a promotion-playoff against the 12th-placed team in Tippeligaen to win promotion. The bottom four teams were relegated to the 2. divisjon.

Odd Grenland and Skeid won promotion to Tippeligaen, while Kjelsås lost the promotion-playoff against Kongsvinger. Aalesund, Strindheim, Ullern and Ham-Kam was relegated to the 2. divisjon.

== League table ==
Pos	Team	Pld	W	D	L	GF	GA	GD	Pts	Promotion, qualification or relegation
1	Odd Grenland (C, P)	26	16	7	3	55	18	+37	55	Promotion to Tippeligaen
2	Skeid (P)	26	13	5	8	40	37	+3	44	Promotion to Tippeligaen
3	Kjelsås	26	11	8	7	43	34	+9	41	Qualification for the promotion play-offs
4	Byåsen	26	12	4	10	38	30	+8	40	
5	Start	26	11	6	9	37	29	+8	39	
6	Bryne	26	12	3	11	46	42	+4	39	
7	Hødd	26	12	2	12	40	45	−5	38	
8	Raufoss	26	11	4	11	35	43	−8	37	
9	Lyn	26	9	9	8	44	26	+18	36	
10	Eik-Tønsberg	26	9	8	9	39	35	+4	35	
11	Aalesund (R)	26	10	4	12	26	41	−15	34	Relegation to Second Division
12	Strindheim (R)	26	8	8	10	37	37	0	32	Relegation to Second Division
13	Ullern (R)	26	6	3	17	26	55	−29	21	Relegation to Second Division
14	HamKam (R)	26	6	1	19	30	64	−34	19	Relegation to Second Division

Source: nifs.no
Rules for classification: 1) points; 2) goal difference; 3) number of goals scored.
(C) Champions; (P) Promoted; (R) Relegated

== Results ==
Home \ Away	AAL	BRY	BYÅ	EIK	HAM	ILH	KJE	LYN	ODD	RIL	SKD	IKS	SDM	ULL
Aalesund	—	3–0	1–1	2–1	3–1	0–3	0–3	2–0	2–0	2–1	0–2	1–6	2–1	2–1
Bryne	2–0	—	1–0	1–2	2–1	2–3	2–0	1–0	2–4	0–1	1–1	1–0	3–4	6–0
Byåsen	0–1	1–0	—	1–2	4–1	3–1	0–3	1–1	1–1	8–0	0–1	1–0	1–0	1–2
Eik-Tønsberg	0–0	0–4	1–2	—	3–0	3–1	1–1	2–0	1–2	1–1	5–0	4–1	1–1	2–0
HamKam	3–0	3–2	1–2	0–1	—	0–3	1–3	3–5	0–6	1–3	3–1	2–1	2–0	0–2
Hødd	1–0	2–0	0–2	1–0	2–1	—	2–3	0–0	2–3	2–0	2–4	2–4	5–3	4–1
Kjelsås	2–2	1–2	2–1	3–3	2–2	4–2	—	3–1	2–1	2–1	3–1	1–1	1–1	1–0
Lyn	1–0	5–0	1–2	3–1	2–0	0–1	2–2	—	0–0	6–0	1–1	1–1	0–0	5–0
Odd Grenland	5–0	0–0	1–0	1–1	5–0	5–0	2–1	1–1	—	4–0	4–1	3–0	0–0	1–0
Raufoss	2–0	3–4	0–1	4–1	4–0	0–0	1–0	1–1	2–0	—	2–1	2–0	1–1	3–0
Skeid	3–0	3–0	3–0	1–1	1–3	1–0	0–0	2–0	0–1	1–0	—	1–0	2–1	3–3
Start	0–2	2–2	3–1	2–1	3–1	2–0	2–0	1–0	0–0	4–2	3–0	—	0–0	0–0
Strindheim	1–1	2–4	2–2	3–1	1–0	4–0	2–0	0–1	1–3	0–1	2–3	1–0	—	4–3
Ullern	1–0	1–4	1–2	0–0	3–1	0–1	1–0	1–7	1–2	3–0	2–3	0–1	0–2	—

Source: NIFS (in Norwegian)
Legend: Blue = home team win; Yellow = draw; Red = away team win.

== Top goalscorers ==
Goals	Player	Club
18	(Norway) Caleb Francis	Bryne
16	(Norway) Tommy Nilsen	Lyn
15	(Norway) Rune Medalen	Bryne
15	(Norway) Ole Petter Skonnord	Kjelsås
14	(Norway) Andre Skotheim	Hødd
12	(Norway) Trond Nordseth	Byåsen
10	(Norway) Iver Sletten	Skeid
9	(Norway) Knut Brændvang	Kjelsås
9	(Norway) Lasse Jørn Fredriksen	Eik-Tønsberg
9	(Norway) Vegard Olsen	Strindheim
9	(Norway) Erling Ytterland	Aalesund
8	(Norway) Frode Birkeland	Eik-Tønsberg
8	(Norway) Dag Halvorsen	Kjelsås
8	(Norway) Krister Isaksen	Start
8	(Norway) Frode Johnsen	Odd Grenland
8	(Norway) Arne Sandstø	Odd Grenland
8	(Norway) Harald Åsland Riise	Hødd
8	(Norway) Tom Eirik Sørum	Byåsen

== See also ==
- 1998 Tippeligaen
- 1998 2. divisjon
- 1998 3. divisjon
