= 2010 Norwegian Second Division =

Norwegian football league season

The 2010 2. divisjon season was the men's third-tier football competition in Norway.

26 games were played in 4 groups, with 3 points given for wins and 1 for draws. HamKam, Notodden, Stavanger and Skeid were relegated from the 2009 Norwegian First Division. Asker, Hødd, Randaberg and HamKam were promoted to the 2011 1. divisjon. Number twelve, thirteen and fourteen were relegated to the 3. divisjon, except for the number twelve team with the most points. The winning teams from each of the 24 groups in the 3. divisjon each faced a winning team from another group in a playoff match, resulting in 12 playoff winners which were promoted to the 2011 2. divisjon.

== League tables ==
=== Group 1 ===
Pos	Team	Pld	W	D	L	GF	GA	GD	Pts	Promotion or relegation
1	Asker (P)	26	17	6	3	71	30	+41	57	Promotion to First Division
2	Notodden	26	16	3	7	71	25	+46	51	
3	Kjelsås	26	14	5	7	58	47	+11	47	
4	Nest-Sotra	26	14	4	8	54	50	+4	46	
5	Manglerud Star	26	11	8	7	62	46	+16	41	
6	Åsane	26	11	5	10	49	46	+3	38	
7	Bærum	26	10	5	11	52	44	+8	35	
8	Førde	26	10	5	11	43	61	−18	35	
9	Frigg	26	8	10	8	44	48	−4	34	
10	Vålerenga 2	26	10	2	14	61	68	−7	32	
11	Stabæk 2	26	8	7	11	41	53	−12	31	
12	Os (R)	26	7	6	13	41	52	−11	27	Relegation to Third Division
13	Stord (R)	26	5	5	16	35	71	−36	20	Relegation to Third Division
14	Fana (R)	26	3	5	18	27	68	−41	14	Relegation to Third Division

(P) Promoted; (R) Relegated

=== Group 2 ===
Pos	Team	Pld	W	D	L	GF	GA	GD	Pts	Promotion or relegation
1	Hødd (P)	26	18	6	2	81	23	+58	60	Promotion to First Division
2	Kristiansund	26	17	4	5	60	35	+25	55	
3	Skeid	26	15	5	6	49	28	+21	50	
4	Rosenborg 2	26	14	5	7	64	39	+25	47	
5	Aalesund 2	26	11	3	12	36	47	−11	36	
6	Nardo	26	9	7	10	44	46	−2	34	
7	Strindheim	26	8	9	9	33	42	−9	33	
8	Molde 2	26	8	8	10	47	57	−10	32	
9	Steinkjer	26	9	4	13	40	56	−16	31	
10	Levanger	26	8	6	12	46	49	−3	30	
11	Byåsen (Note: Byåsen was docked two points for using an ineligible player.)	26	8	7	11	40	60	−20	29	
12	Skarbøvik (R)	26	8	4	14	34	39	−5	28	Relegation to Third Division
13	Oslo City (R)	26	5	4	17	37	61	−24	19	Relegation to Third Division
14	Kolstad (R)	26	3	10	13	32	61	−29	19	Relegation to Third Division

(P) Promoted; (R) Relegated

=== Group 3 ===
Pos	Team	Pld	W	D	L	GF	GA	GD	Pts	Promotion or relegation
1	Randaberg (P)	26	17	2	7	51	40	+11	53	Promotion to First Division
2	Flekkerøy	26	14	5	7	60	33	+27	47	
3	FK Tønsberg	26	13	7	6	62	39	+23	46	
4	Ørn-Horten	26	14	3	9	52	46	+6	45	
5	Vard Haugesund (Note: Vard was docked three points for using an ineligible player.)	26	13	4	9	54	35	+19	40	
6	Odd Grenland 2	26	10	8	8	40	41	−1	38	
7	Vindbjart	26	11	5	10	47	52	−5	38	
8	Vidar	26	10	7	9	47	40	+7	37	
9	Pors Grenland	26	11	4	11	41	41	0	37	
10	Ålgård	26	8	10	8	45	36	+9	34	
11	Fram Larvik	26	9	6	11	45	53	−8	33	
12	Start 2 (Note: Start 2 was docked one point for using an ineligible player.) (R)	26	7	6	13	40	51	−11	26	Relegation to Third Division
13	Kopervik (R)	26	4	3	19	29	65	−36	15	Relegation to Third Division
14	Stavanger (Note: Stavanger was docked one point for using an ineligible player.) (R)	26	3	6	17	29	70	−41	14	Relegation to Third Division

(P) Promoted; (R) Relegated

=== Group 4 ===
Pos	Team	Pld	W	D	L	GF	GA	GD	Pts	Promotion or relegation
1	HamKam (P)	26	19	2	5	75	25	+50	59	Promotion to First Division
2	KFUM Oslo	26	18	3	5	69	30	+39	56 (Note: KFUM was docked one point for using an ineligible player.)	
3	Brumunddal	26	14	4	8	62	50	+12	46	
4	Raufoss	26	13	3	10	41	38	+3	42	
5	Harstad	26	13	2	11	58	51	+7	41	
6	Tromsø 2	26	12	1	13	51	50	+1	37	
7	Lørenskog	26	11	3	12	56	55	+1	36	
8	Senja	26	10	5	11	48	52	−4	35	
9	Valdres	26	10	5	11	40	45	−5	35	
10	Ull-Kisa	26	9	5	12	43	56	−13	32	
11	Strømsgodset 2	26	9	4	13	63	70	−7	31	
12	Lillehammer (Note: Lillehammer survived as the best number-twelve-team, because the club Lyn was liquidated.)	26	9	4	13	45	53	−8	31	
13	Eidsvold Turn (R)	26	7	5	14	41	58	−17	26	Relegation to Third Division
14	Mo (R)	26	3	4	19	26	85	−59	13	Relegation to Third Division

(P) Promoted; (R) Relegated

== Top goalscorers ==
Rank	Scorer	Club	Goals	Group
1	(Norway) Thomas Lehne Olsen	HamKam	25	Group 4
2	(Norway) Mostafa Abdellaoue	Vålerenga 2	23	Group 1
2	(Norway) Armin Sistek	Asker	23	Group 1
4	(Norway) Stian Nikodemussen	Manglerud Star	21	Group 1
4	(Norway) Øyvind L. Gaustad	Vindbjart	21	Group 3
6	(Norway) Eirik Soltvedt	Ull-Kisa	20	Group 4
7	(Norway) Jim Johansen	Strømsgodset 2	19	Group 4
8	(Norway) Tarjei Dale	Notodden	18	Group 1
8	(Norway) Joachim Magnussen	Hødd	18	Group 2
8	(Norway) Tor Øyvind Reinemo	KFUM	18	Group 4

Source: Group 1, Group 2, Group 3 & Group 4.
