= Høybråten og Stovner IL =

Norwegian sports club

- Full name: Høybråten og Stovner Idrettslag
- Nickname(s): HSIL
- Founded: 1916
- Ground: Høybråten kunstgress (football); Stovnerbanen (athletics), Oslo
- League: Fourth Division
Home colours

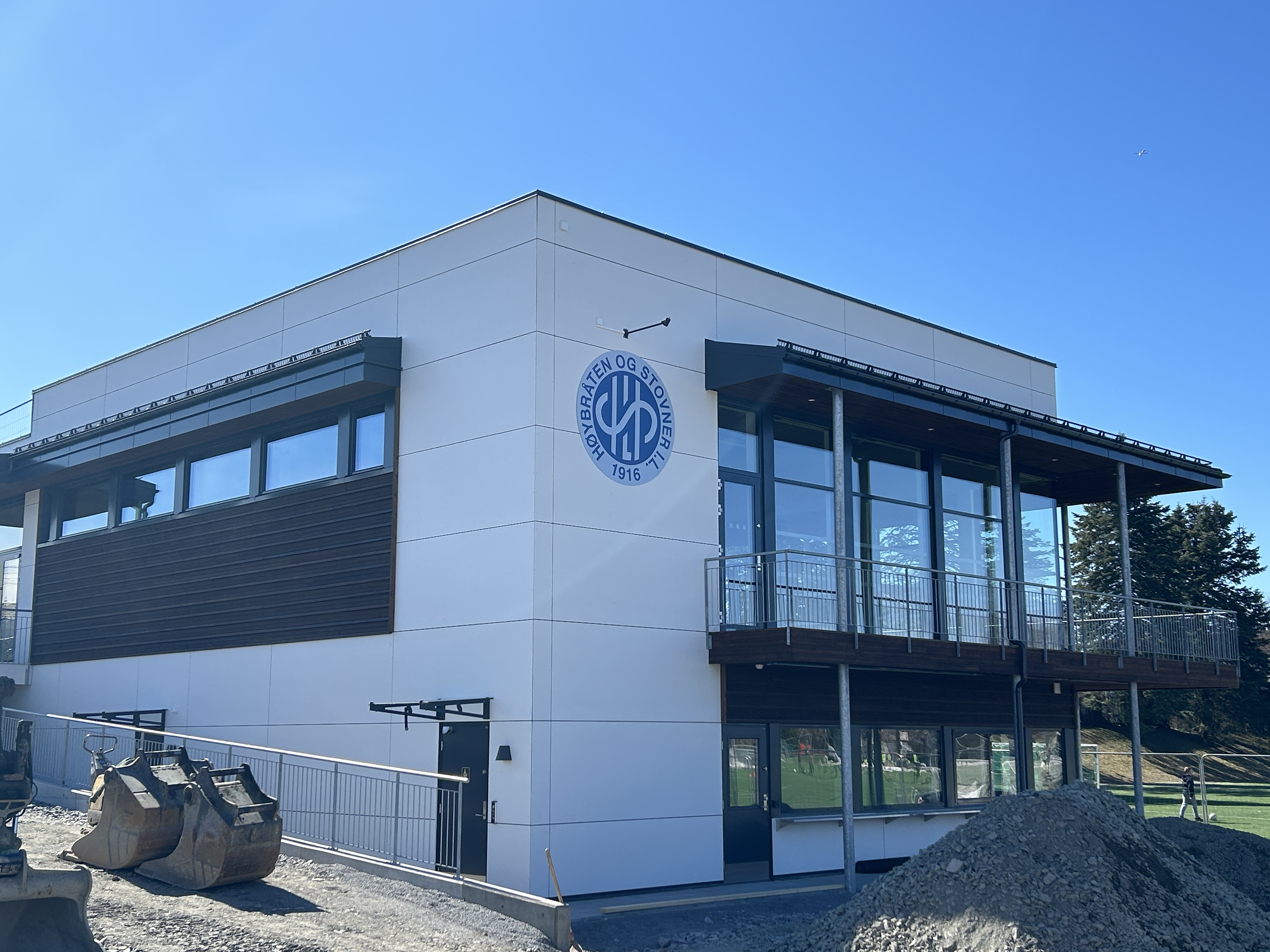
The club house of Høybråten og Stovner IL.

Høybråten og Stovner Idrettslag is a Norwegian sports club from Stovner borough, Oslo. It has sections for association football, team handball, track and field, orienteering, skiing, gymnastics and floorball.

It was founded on 18 March 1918. The club colors are blue.

The cross-country team won the Norwegian championship in relay for women in 2004 and 2007. In 2004 Kristin Størmer Steira competed for the team.

The men's football team currently plays in the Fourth Division, the fifth tier of Norwegian football. It last played in the Third Division in 1996. It formerly cooperated to prop up an umbrella team called Groruddalen BK, but this team went defunct in 2008.
