= 1996 Norwegian Third Division =

Norwegian football league season

The 1996 season of the 3. divisjon, the fourth highest association football league for men in Norway.

Between 22 and 24 games (depending on group size) were played in 19 groups, with 3 points given for wins and 1 for draws. All group winners were promoted to the 2. divisjon, as well as some of the best runners-up.

== Tables ==
Group 1

1. Råde – promoted
2. Sprint-Jeløy – promoted
3. Grue
4. Kolbotn
5. Rygge
6. Trysil
7. Kongsvinger 2
8. Brandval
9. Moss 2
10. Nordby
11. Flisa – relegated
12. Oppegård – relegated
13. Galterud – relegated

Group 2

1. Østsiden – promoted
2. Mercantile – promoted
3. Hafslund
4. Skeid 2
5. Lisleby
6. Tune
7. Oppsal
8. Fagerborg
9. Greåker
10. KFUM
11. Bækkelaget – relegated
12. Nordstrand – relegated

Group 3

1. Gjøvik-Lyn – promoted
2. Eidsvold Turn – promoted
3. Vardal
4. Aurskog/Finstadbru
5. Kolbu/KK
6. Trøgstad/Båstad
7. Sørumsand
8. Kvik Halden
9. Toten
10. Hærland
11. Askim – relegated
12. Blaker – relegated
13. Biri – relegated

Group 4

1. Lørenskog – promoted
2. Stange
3. Rælingen
4. Vinstra
5. Follebu
6. Sel
7. Fart
8. Bjerke
9. Lillehammer FK
10. Nittedal
11. Hammerseng – relegated
12. Nes – relegated

Group 5

1. Årvoll – promoted
2. Asker
3. Stabæk
4. Drafn
5. Gjelleråsen
6. Birkebeineren
7. Åmot
8. Holmen
9. Grorud
10. Høybråten og Stovner – relegated
11. Steinberg – relegated
12. Skiold – relegated

Group 6

1. Stokke – promoted
2. Langesund
3. Skotfoss
4. Snøgg
5. Urædd
6. Rjukan
7. Flint
8. Borre
9. Kragerø
10. Storm
11. Holmestrand – relegated
12. Stathelle – relegated

Group 7

1. Jerv – promoted
2. Larvik Turn – promoted
3. Øyestad
4. Randesund
5. Sørfjell
6. Tjølling
7. Lyngdal
8. Kvinesdal
9. Mandalskameratene
10. Fram
11. Nesjar – relegated
12. Giv Akt – relegated

Group 8

1. Sola – promoted
2. Staal
3. Stavanger
4. Ulf-Sandnes (-> Sandnes FK)
5. Varhaug
6. Figgjo
7. Egersund
8. Nærbø
9. Hundvåg
10. Ganddal – relegated
11. Riska – relegated
12. Bjerkreim – relegated

Group 9

1. Trott – promoted
2. Odda
3. Åkra
4. Nord
5. Bremnes
6. Buøy
7. Radøy
8. Skjold
9. Solid
10. Torvastad – relegated
11. Voss – relegated
12. Erdal – relegated

Group 10

1. Brann 2 – promoted
2. Vadmyra
3. Ny-Krohnborg
4. Nymark
5. Follese
6. Hovding
7. Bjørnar
8. Florvåg
9. Austrheim
10. Lyngbø – relegated
11. Bjarg – relegated
12. Telavåg – relegated

Group 11

1. Førde – promoted
2. Sogndal 2
3. Tornado
4. Florø
5. Fjøra
6. Jotun
7. Eid
8. Sandane
9. Jølster
10. Høyang
11. Anga
12. Måløy – relegated
13. Vik – relegated

Group 12

1. Volda – promoted
2. Velledalen og Ringen
3. Bergsøy
4. Hødd 2
5. Hareid
6. Aksla
7. Stranda
8. Langevåg
9. Valder
10. Spjelkavik
11. Vartdal – relegated
12. Åram – relegated

Group 13

1. Træff – promoted
2. Averøykameratene – promoted
3. Kristiansund
4. Clausenengen
5. Kvass/Ulvungen
6. Tomrefjord
7. Bryn
8. Sunndal
9. Ekko/Aureosen
10. Surnadal
11. Isfjorden
12. Søya

Group 14

1. Nidelv – promoted
2. Hitra
3. Singsås
4. Tynset
5. KIL/Hemne
6. Røros
7. NTHI
8. Strindheim 2
9. Fosen
10. Brekken
11. HIL/Fevåg – relegated
12. Rissa – relegated

Group 15

1. Ranheim – promoted
2. Kvamskameratene
3. Heimdal
4. Vinne
5. Bangsund
6. Nessegutten (-> Levanger FK)
7. Sverre (-> Levanger FK)
8. Tranabakkan
9. Fram
10. Sverresborg – relegated
11. Varden – relegated
12. Vuku – relegated

Group 16

1. Mosjøen – promoted
2. Mo – promoted
3. Bodø/Glimt 2
4. Saltdalkameratene
5. Nesna
6. Grand Bodø
7. Nordre Meløy
8. Sørfold
9. Åga – relegated
10. Brønnøysund
11. Korgen
12. Sømna
13. Bodøkameratene – relegated

Group 17

1. Lofoten – promoted
2. Narvik/Nor – promoted
3. Skånland
4. Vågakameratene
5. Leknes
6. Medkila
7. Landsås
8. Flakstad
9. Stokmarknes
10. Beisfjord
11. Kabelvåg – relegated
12. Alsvåg – relegated

Group 18

1. Tromsø 2 – promoted
2. Skarp
3. Salangen
4. Lyngen/Karnes
5. Balsfjord
6. Ramfjord
7. Ulfstind
8. Nordreisa
9. Storfjord
10. Pioner
11. Tromsdalen 2
12. Mellembygd – relegated
13. Ringvassøy – relegated

Group 19

1. Polarstjernen – promoted
2. Hammerfest
3. Bossekop
4. Kirkenes
5. Bjørnevatn
6. Honningsvåg
7. Alta 2
8. Nordkinn
9. Nordlys
10. Sørøy Glimt
11. Kautokeino
12. Norild – relegated
13. Rafsbotn – relegated
