= Orkanger IF =

Norwegian sports club

- Full name: Orkanger Idrettsforening
- Founded: 1 January 1901
- Ground: Idrettsparken, Orkanger
- League: Fifth Division
Home colours

Orkanger Idrettsforening is a Norwegian sports club from Orkanger, Sør-Trøndelag. It has sections for association football, team handball, track and field, orienteering, Nordic skiing, swimming, gymnastics, powerlifting and dancing.

== History ==
It was founded on 1 January 1901. On 12 September 1947 it incorporated the clubs Orkanger TF and IL Njardar. In 1953 it lacked sections for handball, swimming, powerlifting and dancing, but had a section for speed skating.

Jan Tore Ophaug started his career here. The club was coached by Harald Sunde (playing coach) from 1975 to 1977 and Roger Albertsen from 1989 to 1992.

The men's football team played in the Second Division, the third tier of Norwegian football from 1995 to 1997. In 1997 it was relegated, but from 1998 it joined forced with neighbor and rival Orkdal IL to field the team Orkdal IL/Orkanger IF (OIL/OIF), still in the Second Division. The merger was later formalized through the club Orkla FK. Orkanger IF still fielded teams below junior level.

Late in September 2010 Orkanger IF held a general election among its members to see if the club still wanted to contribute in the collaboration to keep Orkla FK alive. In the election, about 60% of the votes went in favour of withdrawing from the collaboration. The result meant that Orkanger IF were free to field their own team in the men's league. As of this, Orkanger IF have two men's teams (a first team and a B team) in the Sixth Division. The manager is Ronny Folvik. Orienteer Ellen Sofie Olsvik represented the club for a period.
