= Atle Maurud =

Norwegian footballer (born 1970)

Personal information
- Date of birth: 15 October 1970 (age 56)
- Height: 1.83 m (6 ft 0 in)
- Position: Striker

Senior career*
Years	Team	Apps	(Gls)
–1992	Gjøvik		
1993	Gjøvik-Lyn		
1994–1996	Hamarkameratene	45	(?)
1997	Lyn	22	(6)
1998–2001	Hamarkameratene	73	(?)
2001	FF Lillehammer		
2002	Raufoss		
2003–2005	Gjøvik-Lyn		
- * Club domestic league appearances and goals

Atle Maurud (born 15 October 1970) is a retired Norwegian football striker.

He hails from Gjøvik, and played for Gjøvik SK and SK Gjøvik-Lyn before joining Hamarkameratene ahead of the 1994 season. He only played two Norwegian Premier League games in 1994, but then established himself in the first team. In the 1997 season he played for SFK Lyn. He played regularly, but the team was relegated and he returned to Hamarkameratene. The team experienced a series of relegations to the Second Division, but was back in the First Division for the 2000 season. He stayed here until 2001, when he did not get much first-team football and was loaned out to FF Lillehammer. He then played for Raufoss IL and SK Gjøvik-Lyn again.
