= Orkdal IL =

Norwegian sports club

- Full name: Orkdal Idrettslag
- Founded: 15 October 1903
- Ground: Fannremsmoen; Fannrem

Orkdal Idrettslag is a Norwegian sports club from Fannrem, Sør-Trøndelag. It has sections for association football, team handball, frisbee, Nordic skiing, alpine skiing and biathlon.

== History ==
The club traces its roots back to 15 October 1903, when the skiing club SL Prøven was founded. It changed its name to IL Prøven in 1908 and then Orkdal IL in 1926. It was now a multi-sports club. In 1934, Orkdal IL merged with the gymnastics club Fannrem TF and took the name Orkdal TIL. In 1945, this club merged with the former AIF club Orkdal AIL to finally assume the name Orkdal IL. The club mainly operated at the multi-use stadium Fannremsmoen and the skiing area Knyken.

In 1993, Orkdal IL was one of the leading ski jumping clubs in the world, sporting a three-man team of Bjørn Myrbakken, Roar Ljøkelsøy and Terje Nyhus.

In football, Orkdal IL is well known as the childhood club of Nils Arne Eggen, who also managed the senior team from 1983 to 1985. Other players include Knut Thorbjørn Eggen, Øystein Wormdal and Vegard Heggem. The men's team was a mainstay in the Norwegian Second Division until its relegation in 1996. After winning its group in the 1997 Third Division, the team fielded as Orkdal/Orkanger (OIL/OIF) together with Orkanger IF in the 1998 Second Division before the teams merged to form Orkla FK with a goal of winning promotion to the First Division. The leader of the football section at the time was Jorodd Asphjell.

Handballer Kari Aalvik Grimsbø has also played for Orkdal IL. In athletics, the club had two members win medals at the Norwegian Championships. Reidulf Wormdahl won a silver and bronze medal in the triple jump in 1929 and 1931, whereas Elise Engen won a bronze medal in the standing long jump in 1987.
