= Tommy Nilsen =

Norwegian footballer (born 1976)

Personal information
- Date of birth: 28 May 1976 (age 50)
- Position: Striker

Youth career
- Ellingsrud
- Lyn

Senior career*
| Years | Team | Apps | (Gls) |
| 1995−2003 | Lyn | 139 | (60) |
- * Club domestic league appearances and goals

Tommy Nilsen (born 28 May 1976) is a retired Norwegian football forward.

He joined Lyn in 1995 after playing youth football for the club. He scored 14 goals in 1996, with the club winning promotion to the 1997 Norwegian Premier League, but here he fell through with only 1 goal in 20 games. In the following years he scored 16, 14 and 11 goals in 1998, 1999 and 2000 respectively, but in the return to the 2001 Norwegian Premier League he scored 4 times. He thereafter spent two years without playing, due to injury, and retired.
