= Molde FK 2 =

Norwegian league football

Molde 2
- Full name: Molde Fotballklubb 2
- Short name: MFK 2
- Founded: 19 June 1911; 115 years ago
- Ground: Aker Stadion
- Capacity: 11,249
- Chairman: Odd Ivar Moen
- Head coach: Magnus Ellevold Strand
- League: Norwegian Third Division
- 2024: Group 5, 8th of 14
- Website: https://www.moldefk.no/
Home colours	Away colours	Third colours

Molde FK 2, commonly known as just Molde 2, is the reserve team of Molde FK. They currently play in 3. divisjon, the fourth tier of Norwegian league football. Reserve teams have been allowed to play in the Norwegian league system since 1990, and Molde 2 have competed every year.

As a reserve team, the highest league Molde 2 can currently enter is the 2. divisjon, the third tier of the league system. The team played in 2. divisjon in 1991, between 1996 and 2006 and from 2009 to 2016, when it was relegated to 3. divisjon.

== Current squad ==
As of 20 July 2026

Note: Flags indicate national team as defined under FIFA eligibility rules; some limited exceptions apply. Players may hold more than one non-FIFA nationality.

No.	Pos.	Nation	Player
2	DF	NOR	Oliver Berg Hansen
13	FW	NOR	Håkon Dyvik
30	MF	NOR	Christian André Sunde
39	GK	NOR	Isak Stavheim Welde
40	DF	NOR	Kasper Fagervoll Fylling
41	GK	NOR	William Viken
42	DF	NOR	Kristian Skuseth
43	DF	NOR	Sebastian Aleksandersen
44	DF	NOR	Henrik Bye Aarstad
45	DF	NOR	Ulrik Langlie Skrede
47	MF	NOR	Ole Rindli Sandnes
48	MF	NOR	Petter Berg With

No.	Pos.	Nation	Player
49	MF	NOR	Noah Ljøen Bye
50	MF	NOR	Liam Andersen Wangen
51	MF	NOR	Alireza Mukhtari
53	FW	NOR	Igor Fabian Gosik
54	FW	NOR	Jonathan Heggem Fugelsnes
56	MF	NOR	Faveur Ndayizeye
58	DF	NOR	Daniel Risan Nakken
60	DF	NOR	Daniel Bayam Sylte
—	DF	NOR	Ognjen Marcovic
—	FW	NOR	Oscar Rosing
—	MF	NOR	Alex Szamboti

=== Out on loan ===
Note: Flags indicate national team as defined under FIFA eligibility rules; some limited exceptions apply. Players may hold more than one non-FIFA nationality.

No.	Pos.	Nation	Player

== Staff ==
=== Coaching staff ===
Role	Name
Head coach	(Norway) Magnus Ellevold Strand
Assistant coach	(Norway) Jonas Solbakken
Goalkeeping coach	(Norway)
Fitness coach	(Norway) Mads Sloth Mikkelsen

=== Medical and sport science staff ===
Role	Name
Physiotherapist	(Norway) Mats Jørgensen
Doctor	(Norway) Martin Engeland
Performance analyst	(Norway) Eric Laurie
Team leader/Equipment manager	(Norway) Asbjørn Outzen
Assistant team leader	(Norway) Tor Gunnar Hagbø

== Recent history ==
As of match played 27 October 2018

Season	League										Top goalscorer (league)	
Season	Tier	Division	Pos	Pld	W	D	L	GF	GA	Pts	Name	Goals
2010	3	2. divisjon group 2	8th	26	8	8	10	47	57	32	n/a	
2011	3	2. divisjon group 2	8th	26	9	4	11	43	53	30 (Note: Molde 2 was deducted 1 point.)	n/a	
2012	3	2. divisjon group 2	10th	26	9	5	12	65	67	32	Vini Dantas	15
2013	3	2. divisjon group 1	11th	26	9	1	16	49	63	28	Zlatko Tripic	8
2014	3	2. divisjon group 2	11th	26	7	5	14	40	64	26	Sander Svendsen	7
2015	3	2. divisjon group 2	11th	26	9	4	13	38	40	31	Agnaldo; Tommy Høiland; Eskil Rønningen	5
2016	3	2. divisjon group 2	↓ 12th (Note: 7 of 14 teams were relegated to 3. divisjon because of restructuring of 2. divisjon and lower divisions.)	26	6	7	13	42	49	25	Pape Paté Diouf	9
2017	4	3. divisjon group 5	7th	26	12	1	13	52	53	37	Sivert Gussiås	14
2018	4	3. divisjon group 1	3rd	26	17	2	7	66	42	53	Sivert Gussiås	16
2019	4	3. divisjon group 1	7th	26	11	3	12	50	48	36	Tobias Hestad	10

Source: NIFS.no

== History of league positions ==
Reserve teams have been eligible to play in the Norwegian league system since 1990.

	1990	1991	1992– 1995	1996– 2006	2007– 2008	2009– 2016	2017–
Level 1							
Level 2							
Level 3							
Level 4							

== See also ==
- Reserve teams in Norwegian football
