= IL Fram =

Norwegian sports club

- Full name: Idrettslaget Fram
- Founded: 1892
- Ground: Skatvalshallen (handball, volleyball); Framnes stadion (football, athletics); Skatval

IL Fram
Home colours

Idrettslaget Fram is a Norwegian sports club from Skatval, Nord-Trøndelag. It has sections for association football, team handball, track and field and volleyball.

It was founded in 1892. It is currently chaired by Eli Arnstad.

The men's football team plays in the Fourth Division, the fifth tier of football in Norway. It last played in the Second Division in 1995, and in the Third Division in 2006.

The club has had some success in athletics, with Oskar Midtlyng representing the club.

Brit Sandaune played for the women's youth football section until 1985.
