= Melhus IL =

Norwegian sports club

- Full name: Melhus Idrettslag
- Founded: 28 February 1898; 127 years ago
- Ground: Gruva, Melhus Municipality
- League: 3. divisjon
- 2024: 3. divisjon group 4, 4th of 14
Home colours

Melhus Idrettslag is a Norwegian sports club from Melhus Municipality in Trøndelag county. It has sections for association football, team handball, volleyball, orienteering, Nordic skiing, weightlifting, and powerlifting.

It was established on 28 February 1898.

The men's football team last played in the Second Division in 1996. The football teams of Melhus IL and Tiller IL started a cooperation after the 2012 season, and the team that was known as Melhus/Tiller in the 2013 season was promoted to the Second Division. Ahead of the 2014 season, the cooperation evolved into an own club which was named Rødde FK.
