= IL Stålkameratene =

Norwegian sports club

Stålkameratene
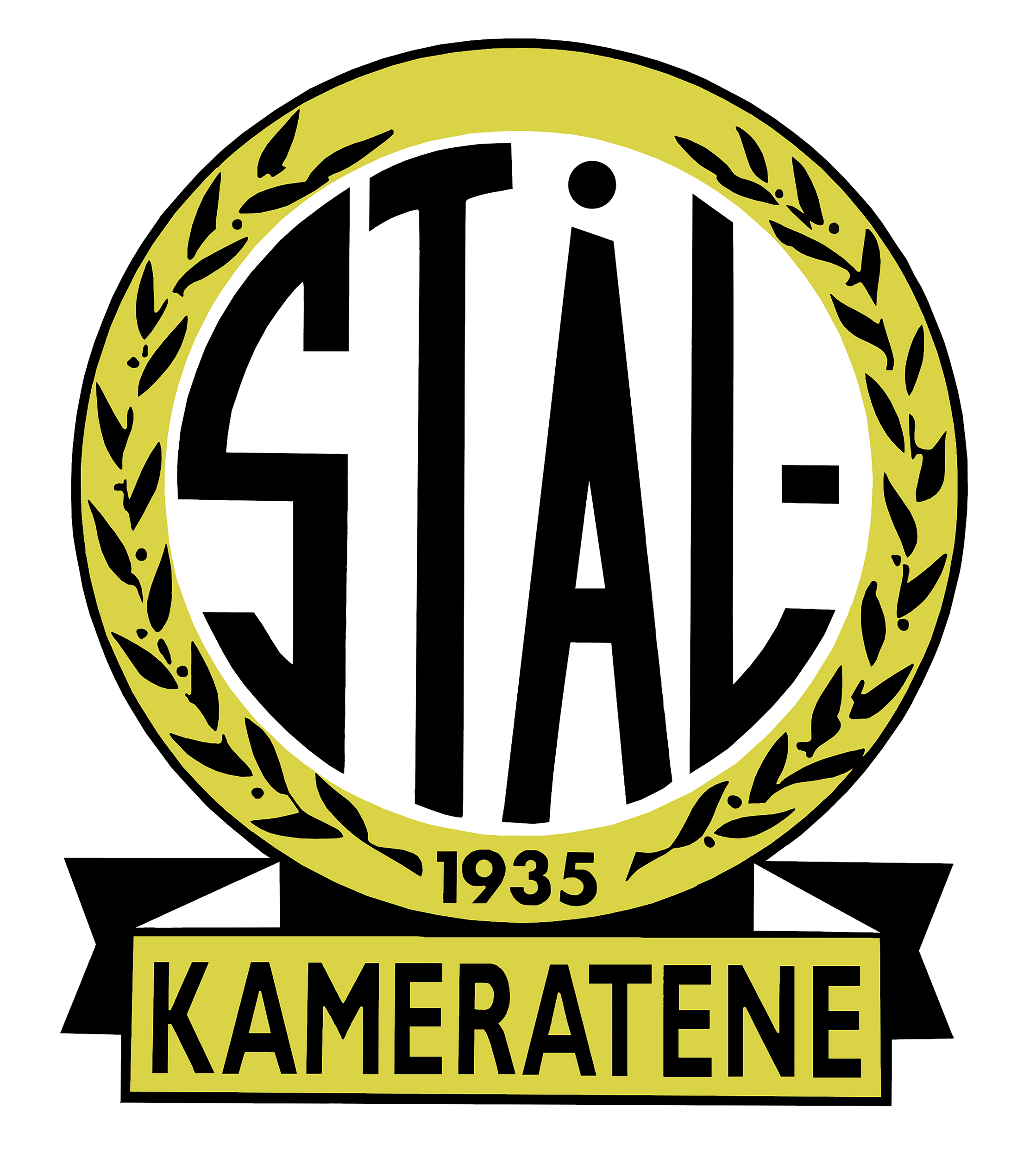
- Full name: Idrettslaget Stålkameratene
- Founded: 11 January 1935 (91 years ago)
- Based in: Mo i Rana
- Stadium: Stålhallen
- Colours: Yellow; Black
- Website: https://staalkam.no/

Idrettslaget Stålkameratene, Stål for short, is a Norwegian sports club from Mo i Rana, Nordland. It has sections for judo, biathlon, Nordic skiing and football.

== History ==
The club was founded on 11 January 1935 as Mo AIL, a club with membership in the Workers Confederation of Sports. After the Second World War the Workers Confederation of Sports was dissolved, and the club changed its name to IL Stålkameratene. The name Stålkameratene means "Steel Comrades". The city as a whole got a boost in the 1940s and 1950s when the Norsk Jernverk (Norwegian Iron Works) was established in Mo i Rana, with the club profiting accordingly.

== Skiing and athletics ==
Its most famous member in its early days was Simon Slåttvik, Olympic gold medalist in the Nordic combined at the 1952 Winter Olympics. The club's athletics section was also thriving, mainly at national level. Ole Bernt Skarstein became Norwegian champion six times (100 metres: 1964, 1965, 1967, 1968; 200 metres: 1968, 1969) Thorbjørn A. Larsen won the marathon in 1977. Jan Albrigtsen managed one silver medal as his best result (high jump: 1979). Henry Hatling won two medals, a gold in the standing long jump (1986) and silver in the standing high jump (1978); also Eskil Sommernes won the standing long jump in 1988. Unn Andersen managed a silver medal in the discus throw (1971) and a bronze in the shot put (1971). Stålkameratene athletics is as of 2021 flourishing.

== Football ==
Stålkameratene Fotball
- Full name: Idrettslaget Stålkameratene Fotball
- Founded: 11 January 1935 (91 years ago)
- Stadium: Stålhallen; Mo i Rana
- Capacity: -
Home colours	Away colours

The men's football team had its heyday in 1995 and 1996 when it played in the 1. divisjon, the second tier. Then, having just been relegated to the Norwegian Second Division in 1997, they were kicked out after the 1997 season for using ineligible players. They then won re-promotion in a supreme manner. In the 1998 Third Division season they won all their 22 games with a goal difference of 153 for, 15 against. They then had a run in the Second Division from 1999 to 2002. In 2000 they even won their Second Division group, and contested a playoff to win promotion to the First Division. However, they succumbed to Hødd with a 2–7 loss on aggregate. In 2002 they ended last in their Second Division group, and were relegated. They had some mediocre results until winning their Third Division group in 2009. They then contested a playoff for the Second Division, but were beaten 3–2 on aggregate by Harstad IL. In 2010 it won its Third Division group again, but lost out in the promotion playoff against Mjølner.

The club colors is yellow and black, and the home field is Stålhallen with Sagbakken Stadion being used occasionally.

After being relegated from the 3. division, the club now competes in the lower tiers of the Norwegian league system, coached under head coach Elias Bårdsen and assistants Thomas Bohlin and Julian Nerdal Moen.

https://www.fotball.no/fotballdata/klubb/hjem/?fiksId=1381

=== Recent history ===
Season		Pos.	Pl.	W	D	L	GS	GA	P	Cup	Notes
2006	3. divisjon	7	22	10	0	12	48	73	30	First qualifying round	
2007	3. divisjon	3	22	13	1	8	56	39	40	First qualifying round	
2008	3. divisjon	2	22	17	3	2	87	23	54	First round	
2009	3. divisjon	1	20	14	4	1	96	22	49	Second round	Lost promotion play-offs
2010	3. divisjon	1	22	17	3	2	102	34	54	Second round	Lost promotion play-offs
2011	3. divisjon	7	22	6	4	12	32	52	22	First qualifying round	
2012	3. divisjon	6	22	8	5	9	56	61	29	First qualifying round	
2013	3. divisjon	5	22	10	2	10	64	55	32	Second qualifying round	
2014	3. divisjon	6	22	10	2	10	66	72	32	Second qualifying round	
2015	3. divisjon	3	22	13	3	6	50	30	42	First qualifying round	
2016	3. divisjon	↓ 10	22	6	4	12	34	47	22	Second qualifying round	Relegated to 4. divisjon
2017	4. divisjon	↑ 1	20	17	3	0	72	15	54	Second qualifying round	Promoted to 3. divisjon
2018	3. divisjon	↓ 13	26	4	4	18	38	94	16	First qualifying round	Relegated to 4. divisjon
