= Kjelsås Fotball =

- Full name: Kjelsås IL Fotball
- Founded: 16 March 1913; 113 years ago
- Ground: Grefsen stadion, Oslo, Norway
- Capacity: 1,500 (420 seated)
- Chairman: Jo Bergsvand
- Head coach: Eivind Kampen
- League: 2. divisjon
- 2024: 2. divisjon group 2, 6th of 14
Home colours	Away colours	Third colours

Kjelsås Fotball is the association football section of the sports club Kjelsås IL, based in the Kjelsås/Grefsen area of Oslo, Norway. The club was founded in 1913. It currently plays in the 2. divisjon, having been relegated from the 1. divisjon in 2001.

Kjelsås played play-off against Kongsvinger to earn promotion to Tippeligaen in 1998, but lost 7–2 on aggregate. On 11 May 2011, Kjelsås eliminated the top-tier team Vålerenga in the second round of the 2011 Norwegian Cup.

Kjelsås Fotball had 1370 players (of these about 460 female) registered in 2019, divided in 55 teams.

== Recent history ==
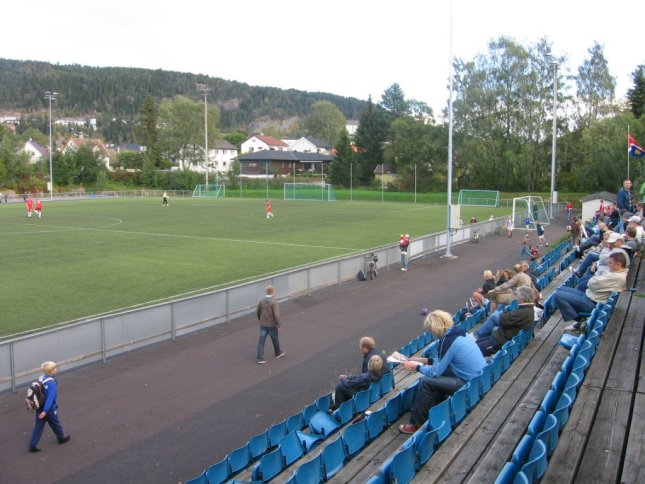
Grefsen stadion

Season		Pos.	Pl.	W	D	L	GS	GA	P	Cup	Notes
1988	2. divisjon	4	22	9	6	7	49	40	33	Third round	
1989	2. divisjon	8	22	8	2	12	33	51	26	First round	
1990	2. divisjon	2	22	12	5	5	40	21	41	Second round	
1991	2. divisjon	3	22	10	7	5	40	29	37	Second round	
1992	2. divisjon	2	22	13	5	4	48	26	44	Second round	
1993	2. divisjon	8	22	8	3	11	38	38	27	Second round	
1994	2. divisjon	9	22	6	8	8	20	34	26	First round	
1995	2. divisjon	3	22	12	4	6	42	19	40	Third round	
1996	2. divisjon	6	22	9	3	10	34	34	30	Second round	
1997	2. divisjon	↑ 1	22	13	6	3	46	20	45	First round	Promoted
1998	1. divisjon	3	26	11	8	7	43	34	41	Third round	Lost playoffs for promotion
1999	1. divisjon	6	26	11	8	7	33	28	41	4th round	
2000	1. divisjon	8	26	8	7	11	30	40	31	Second round	
2001	1. divisjon	↓ 15	30	6	6	18	26	50	24	Second round	Relegated
2002	2. divisjon	6	26	13	5	8	46	30	44	Second round	
2003	2. divisjon	7	26	8	9	9	32	36	33	First round	
2004	2. divisjon	9	26	9	7	10	38	39	34	First round	
2005	2. divisjon	9	26	10	4	12	41	53	34	Second round	
2006	2. divisjon	10	26	10	3	13	36	55	33	Second round	
2007	2. divisjon	4	26	10	6	10	61	57	36	First round	
2008	2. divisjon	10	26	9	6	11	32	41	33	First round	
2009	2. divisjon	9	26	9	5	12	38	47	32	Second round	
2010	2. divisjon	3	26	14	5	7	58	47	47	Second round	
2011	2. divisjon	7	26	11	7	8	61	42	40	Third round	
2012	2. divisjon	5	26	14	2	10	58	48	44	Second round	
2013	2. divisjon	6	26	12	4	10	39	37	40	Second round	
2014	2. divisjon	2	26	18	4	4	74	28	58	First round	
2015	2. divisjon	5	26	13	7	6	62	33	46	Second round	
2016	2. divisjon	6	26	11	8	7	38	34	41	Second round	
2017	2. divisjon	8	26	9	7	10	34	40	34	Third round	
2018	2. divisjon	7	26	9	8	9	38	36	35	Second round	
2019	2. divisjon	3	26	13	8	5	50	30	47	Second round	
2020	2. divisjon	11	13	3	5	5	21	21	14	Cancelled	
2021	2. divisjon	9	26	8	9	9	43	44	33	Second round	
2022	2. divisjon	4	26	12	6	8	45	20	42	Third round	
2023	2. divisjon	6	26	9	8	9	25	28	35	Semi-final	Record attendance: 3,317 vs Molde FK
2024	2. divisjon	6	26	13	6	7	50	39	45	Third round	

== Players ==
=== Current squad ===
As of 26 August 2026

Note: Flags indicate national team as defined under FIFA eligibility rules; some limited exceptions apply. Players may hold more than one non-FIFA nationality.

No.	Pos.	Nation	Player
1	GK	NOR	Jesper Wold
3	DF	NOR	Håvard Meinseth
4	DF	NOR	Henning Vassdal
5	DF	NOR	Martin Helmer Rusten
6	MF	NOR	Kebba Lamin
7	MF	NOR	Thomas Rekdal
8	MF	NOR	Leo Bech Hermansen
9	FW	NOR	Patrik Askengren
10	MF	NOR	Ahmad Adil Abbas
11	FW	NOR	Ole Erik Midtskogen
12	GK	NOR	Justin Knutsson
13	MF	NOR	Eivind Willumsen
14	FW	NOR	Aleksandar Vukicevic

No.	Pos.	Nation	Player
16	MF	NOR	Christyan-Teamrat Petros
17	DF	NOR	Simen Olafsen
19	MF	NOR	Ayub Ibrahim Mahammed
20	MF	NOR	Jesper Tuven Holter
21	MF	NOR	Magnus Solheim
22	DF	NOR	Sigurd Martinussen
24	DF	NOR	Edvard Vestby
25	FW	NOR	Jonas Hanstad
26	FW	NOR	Marco Rodrigues
27	DF	NOR	Sindre Græsdahl
28	DF	NOR	Elliot Anthonsen
29	DF	NOR	Philip Steiner Halvorsen
30	GK	NOR	Terje Kirsebom

=== Out on loan ===
Note: Flags indicate national team as defined under FIFA eligibility rules; some limited exceptions apply. Players may hold more than one non-FIFA nationality.

No.	Pos.	Nation	Player
15	DF	NOR	Jacob Cleve Broch (at FK Union Carl Berner until 31 December 2026)

== Club records ==
Record attendance

- 3,295 vs Kongsvinger IL, 1998 play-off match for Tippeligaen.

Club achievements

- League
  - Highest league finish - 3rd place 1. divisjon, 1998.
  - Second Division winners: 1997.
  - Second Division runner-up: 1982, 1990, 1992, 2014.
  - Third Division winners: 1969, 1977, 1978, 1980.
- Norwegian cup
  - Qualified for Semifinals in 2023 (vs Molde FK)
  - 4th round twice: 1987 (lost 5–3 vs FK Bodø-Glimt), 1994 (lost 3–2 vs Molde FK).

Most games (since 1977)

1. Dag Halvorsen (327 games)
2. Rune Jarl (326 games)
3. Arne Jensen (240 games)

Most goals (since 1995)

1. Dag Halvorsen (96 goals)
2. Simen Stamsø Møller (84 goals)
3. Martin Hansen (71 goals)
