= SK Falk =

Norwegian sports club

- Full name: Sportsklubben Falk
- Founded: 1917
- Ground: Lystlunden stadion, Horten Municipality
- League: Fourth Division
- 2011: Fourth Division / Vestfold, 8th
Home colours

Sportsklubben Falk is a Norwegian sports club from Horten Municipality, Vestfold. It has sections for association football and handball.

It was founded in 1917 as a football club; the handball came in the 1940s. The club had an athletics section from 1920 to 1924, when it broke out and formed the club Horten FIK. Falk also had a bandy section from 1945 to 1949, when it broke out and formed the club Horten BK. In 1945 Falk absorbed the club Horten SK.

The men's football team currently plays in the Fourth Division, the fifth tier of Norwegian football, after being relegated from the Third Division in 2010. It last played in the Second Division in 1997.
