= FK Fauske/Sprint =

Norwegian sports club

- Full name: Fotballklubben Fauske/Sprint
- Founded: 25 April 1937
- Ground: Fauske Kunstgress, Fauske
- League: Third Division
- 2011: Third Division / 11, 9th
Home colours

Fotballklubben Fauske/Sprint is a Norwegian association football club from Fauske Municipality in Nordland county.

It was founded on 25 April 1937.

The men's football team currently plays in the Third Division, the fourth tier of Norwegian football. It last played in the Norwegian Second Division in 2001. After the 2006 season it contested a playoff to win re-promotion, but failed. The women's soccer team plays in the third division.
