= Skjervøy IK =

Norwegian sports club

- Full name: Skjervøy Idrettsklubb
- Founded: 6 June 1930; 94 years ago
- Ground: Skjervøy kunstgress, Skjervøy, Skjervøy Municipality
- League: 3. divisjon
- 2024: 3. divisjon group 6, 5th of 14
Home colours

Skjervøy Idrettsklubb is a Norwegian sports club from Skjervøy Municipality in Troms county. It has sections for association football, team handball, track and field, Nordic skiing, and biathlon.

It was established on 6 June 1930.

The men's football team currently plays in the 3. divisjon, the fourth tier of the Norwegian football league system. It last played in the 2. divisjon in 2003. It then won its 3. divisjon group and contested playoffs to the 2. divisjon in 2008, but lost to Bossekop UL.
