= Harstad IL =

Norwegian football club

- Full name: Harstad Idrettslag
- Founded: 1 March 1903; 123 years ago
- Stadium: Harstad Stadium, Harstad
- Capacity: 1000
- Chairman: Frode Henriksen
- Manager: Torkild Nilsen
- League: Third Division
- 2026: Third Division group 5, 4th of 14
Home colours	Away colours

Harstad Idrettslag is a Norwegian sports club from Harstad, Troms. It has association football, futsal and Nordic skiing sections. The club formerly had sections for track and field, skiing and speed skating, but this was discontinued in 1987. The club colors are yellow and black, and their home field is Harstad stadion. This was Norway's first football stadium with artificial turf.

The men's football team currently plays in the Norwegian Third Division, the fifth tier of Norwegian football. The team last played in the Norwegian First Division in 1997. After that they had a long run in the Second Division. It played in the Third Division in 2003, but won their group and won the playoff 5–2 on aggregate against Innstranden. In 2008 they were back in the Third Division, won the league but lost the playoff to Bodø/Glimt 2 with 6–5 on aggregate after extra time. The next season they won the playoff, beating Stålkameratene 3–2 on aggregate. After two season in the Second Division, Harstad was again relegated in 2011.

The club also won the Northern Norwegian Cup nine times: in 1932, 1938, 1953, 1954, 1955, 1957, 1958, 1962 and 1968. A well-known player from that era is Trygve Bornø.

== Recent history ==
Season		Pos.	Pl.	W	D	L	GS	GA	P	Cup	Notes
2008	3. divisjon	1	20	15	2	1	130	13	47	First round	
2009	3. divisjon	↑ 1	20	18	2	0	139	16	56	First round	Promoted
2010	2. divisjon	5	26	13	2	11	58	51	41	First round	
2011	2. divisjon	↓ 12	26	7	4	15	41	58	25	First round	Relegated
2012	3. divisjon	↑ 2	22	15	4	3	72	24	49	Second round	Promoted
2013	2. divisjon	10	26	8	8	10	44	44	32	Second round	
2014	2. divisjon	8	26	12	3	11	46	33	39	Second round	
2015	2. divisjon	8	26	9	7	10	34	42	34	First round	
2016	2. divisjon	↓ 8	26	8	7	11	45	51	31	First round	Relegated
2017	3. divisjon	6	26	11	6	9	44	39	39	First round	
2018	3. divisjon	6	26	13	3	10	57	52	42	Second round	
2019	3. divisjon	↓ 12	26	8	3	15	33	59	27	Second round	Relegated
2020	Season cancelled										
2021	4. divisjon	↑ 1	8	8	0	0	42	5	24	Third round	Promoted
2022	3. divisjon	↓ 12	26	7	2	17	50	78	23	Second round	Relegated
2023	4. divisjon	↑ 1	18	18	0	0	108	14	54	First round	Promoted
2024	3. divisjon	4	26	15	6	5	55	39	51		
2025	3. divisjon	10	26	9	2	15	61	63	29	First round	
2026	3. divisjon	4	22	12	4	6	66	33	40		
