= Ullern IF =

- Full name: Ullern Idrettsforening
- Founded: 23 February 1909; 117 years ago
- Ground: Ullernbanen (football and bandy, formerly track); Ørakerhallen (handball and basket) both in Ullern, Oslo
- League: 3. divisjon
- 2024: 3. divisjon group 3, 9th of 14
Home colours	Away colours

Ullern Idrettsforening is a Norwegian multi-sports club from Ullern, Oslo. It has sections for association football, team handball, basketball, bandy and cheerleading. The club colors are white and red.

== General history ==
The club was founded in 1971 as a merger of the multi-sports club Liull, the multi-sports club Bestum IF (founded 1914), the gymnastics club Lilleaker TF and Ullern Basket (founded 1956). Liull was in turn a merger of the skiing club Ullern SK (founded 1909) and Lilleaker IF (founded 1913). The club counts 1909 as its founding year.

Lilleaker IF had been named Fagforeningenes IL, Lysaker from 1913 to 1924. That year, the Workers' Sports Federation was founded, but membership for Lilleaker IF here was voted down. As a result, the splinter club Fagforeningenes IL, Lilleaker was established. LIF and Fagen were reunited again in 1936, on the condition that the membership in the Workers' Sports Federation was retained. This federation was discontinued after the Second World War, as the club was also merged with Ullern SK to Liull (a portmanteau of the two names).

Lilleaker TF was originally the women's section of Fagen, founded on 3 October 1929. Following the merger in 1936, the gymnastics section broke away in 1938 to found the gymnastics club Najaden. It was too a member of the Worker's Sports Federation. The club was then renamed Lilleaker TF in 1945, and became a part of the large merger in 1971.

Ullern IF or its predecessors have had sections (which are now defunct) for track and field, amateur boxing, amateur wrestling, gymnastics, judo, Nordic skiing, alpine skiing and tennis.

== Football ==
The men's football team currently plays in the Norwegian Third Division, the fourth tier of the Norwegian football league system, after being relegated from the 2023 Norwegian Second Division.

=== Recent seasons ===
Season	League									Cup	Notes
Season	Division	Pos.	Pl.	W	D	L	GS	GA	P	Cup	Notes
2011	3. divisjon	6	26	12	5	9	56	40	41	First round	
2012	3. divisjon	3	24	14	5	5	59	36	47	First qualifying round	
2013	3. divisjon	2	26	20	2	4	95	42	62	Second round	
2014	3. divisjon	↑ 1	26	19	6	1	76	35	63	Second qualifying round	Promoted
2015	2. divisjon	11	26	6	7	13	33	47	25	First round	
2016	2. divisjon	↓ 12	26	4	6	16	28	51	18	First round	Relegated
2017	3. divisjon	7	26	11	6	9	40	38	39	First round	
2018	3. divisjon	9	26	10	3	13	58	54	33	First round	
2019	3. divisjon	4	26	15	5	6	61	33	50	Second round	
2020	Season cancelled										
2021	3. divisjon	↑ 1	13	11	2	0	36	9	35	Second round	Promoted
2022	2. divisjon	9	24	5	9	10	37	43	24	Second round	

== Players ==
=== Current squad ===
As of 14 August 2023

Note: Flags indicate national team as defined under FIFA eligibility rules; some limited exceptions apply. Players may hold more than one non-FIFA nationality.

No.	Pos.	Nation	Player
1	GK	NOR	Christoffer Bugge
2	DF	NOR	Henrik Navarsete
3	DF	NOR	Tomas Lopez Borgersen
4	DF	NOR	Ismar Dizdar
5	DF	NOR	Abdel-Hedi Ali
6	DF	NOR	Espen Lindøe
7	MF	NOR	Christoffer Skårn
8	MF	NOR	Lars Følstad
9	MF	NOR	Dreni Ademaj
10	MF	NOR	Thomas Martinussen
11	MF	NOR	Lars Jensen Austnes
12	GK	NOR	Jesper Wold
13	DF	NOR	Ola Nikolai Rye
14	FW	NOR	Thomas Støfring

No.	Pos.	Nation	Player
15	MF	NOR	Magnus Fosen
16	MF	NOR	Jonas Holthe
18	MF	NOR	Aksel Bay-Larsen
19	FW	NOR	Emil Jaf
20	DF	NOR	Alexander Nilsen
21	MF	NOR	Brage Tobiassen
22	FW	NOR	Mads Bådsvik
23	FW	NOR	Bendik Foss Evensen
24	MF	NOR	Jonas Jorde
26	DF	NOR	Francklyn Wollum-Goulehi
29	FW	NOR	Jonathan Aarenes
30	GK	NOR	Ingvald Grønseth Benestad
77	FW	NOR	Fitim Azemi
