= FK Vidar =

Norwegian football club

- Full name: Fotballklubben Vidar
- Founded: 18 April 1906; 119 years ago
- Ground: Lassa Idrettspark, Stavanger, Norway
- Capacity: 5,000
- Chairman: Øyvind Eftestøl
- Head coach: Bjørnar Holmvik
- League: 3. divisjon
- 2024: 3. divisjon group 2, 2nd of 14
Home colours	Away colours

FK Vidar is an association football club from Stavanger, Norway. They currently play in the 3. divisjon, the fourth highest level in the Norwegian football league system.

== Club history ==
The club was founded on 18 April 1906. FK Vidar played their first match against Stavanger IF on 15 August 1906. They lost 1–0. They became members of the Norwegian Football Association in 1909, and won their first league title in 1912 when the junior team became district champions of Rogaland.

The club has spent most of its time between the third and fourth tiers in Norway and from 1952 to 1962 they found themselves languishing in the regional leagues. It was not until the 1980s that Vidar began to develop into one of the better teams in Stavanger. They established themselves as one of the top teams at the Norwegian second tier (named 2. divisjon at that time, now known as 1. divisjon), only just failing to achieve promotion in 1984 and 1986 and finishing among the top four a total of five times. They competed directly against their city rivals Viking FK in 1987 and 1988, finishing ahead of them in 1987.

1989 saw the beginning of the decline. FK Vidar were relegated to the third tier, and in 2004 they were relegated again to the fourth tier (Third Division) where they remained for many years. In 2009 Vidar won the play-offs to win re-promotion to the 2010 Norwegian Second Division.

Their ground is Lassa Idrettspark which has a capacity of around 5,000 spectators. The club's colours are red, the home kit is red with white stripes and the away kit is black with white stripes.

Since 2013, the team have developed a strong following of global fans. Sales of the football shirts, with the new Fenrir logo, rocketed. The rise in sales was due to the TV personality Tim Lovejoy tweeting about the team on Twitter. Fans 'watch' matches by following the Twitter feed each game. Some fans have even travelled to Stavanger to watch Vidar play at the Lassa.

== Player records ==
- Topscorer, Jan Fjetland – 289 goals
- Appearance record, Egil Klinkenberg – 510 games (1966–91)

== Recent history ==
Season		Pos.	Pl.	W	D	L	GS	GA	P	Cup	Notes
2003	2. divisjon	10	26	10	1	15	28	71	31	First round	
2004	2. divisjon	↓ 12	26	7	6	13	35	51	27	First round	Relegated to the 3. divisjon
2005	3. divisjon	5	22	9	5	8	46	39	32	First round	
2006	3. divisjon	1	22	16	1	5	75	30	49	First qualifying round	Lost playoffs for promotion
2007	3. divisjon	2	26	18	3	5	70	28	57	Second qualifying round	
2008	3. divisjon	2	26	20	4	2	89	27	64	First round	
2009	3. divisjon	↑ 1	26	22	3	1	92	14	69	Second round	Promoted to the 2. divisjon
2010	2. divisjon	8	26	10	7	9	47	40	37	First round	
2011	2. divisjon	5	26	11	4	11	41	48	37	Second round	
2012	2. divisjon	5	26	10	8	8	42	42	38	Second round	
2013	2. divisjon	11	26	10	3	13	49	66	33	Second round	
2014	2. divisjon	4	26	11	7	8	48	40	40	Second round	
2015	2. divisjon	4	26	10	10	6	60	44	40	First round	
2016	2. divisjon	7	26	12	3	11	55	60	39	Fourth round	
2017	2. divisjon	4	26	13	3	10	56	49	42	First round	
2018	2. divisjon	9	26	10	3	13	41	51	33	Second round	
2019	2. divisjon	↓ 12	26	5	6	15	32	51	21	First round	Relegated to the 3. divisjon
2020	Season cancelled										
2021	3. divisjon	8	13	5	2	6	21	20	17	Second round	
2022	3. divisjon	5	26	12	6	8	54	42	42	Second round	
