= Norwegian Second Division =

- Founded: 1963; 63 years ago 1963–1990 (as 3. divisjon); 1991–2008 (as 2. divisjon); 2009–2011 (as Fair Play-ligaen); 2012–2015 (as Oddsen-ligaen); 2016–2025 (as PostNord-ligaen); 2026–present (as 2. divisjon)
- Country: Norway
- Confederation: UEFA
- Number of clubs: 28 (in two groups of 14)
- Level on pyramid: 3
- Promotion to: Norwegian First Division
- Relegation to: Norwegian Third Division
- Domestic cup: Norwegian Cup
- Current champions: Group 1: Jerv; Group 2: Eidsvold Turn (2026)
- Broadcaster: Direktesport
- Current: 2026 Norwegian Second Division

The Norwegian Second Division, also called 2. divisjon, is the third-highest level of the Norwegian football league system.

There are 28 teams divided into two groups. At the end of the season, the winner of each group earns promotion to the second-highest tier, the First Division. The teams finishing in second place in their respective group will qualify for the promotion play-offs, where they will face each other in a two-legged tie; the winner will then play against the 14th-placed team in First Division for promotion. The bottom three teams in each group are relegated to the Third Division.

The Second Division is the highest league in which a reserve team can participate, and only the reserve teams of Eliteserien clubs are allowed to enter this level. The participation of reserve teams stirs debate from time to time.

== History ==
Between 1963 and 1990, 2. divisjon was the second highest level of the Norwegian football league system, therefore the name of the third highest level was 3. divisjon. When the highest level was rebranded in 1991, this level changed its name to 2. divisjon. From 2009 to 2011, the official name of the league was Fair Play ligaen, and from 2012 to 2015 the name was Oddsen-ligaen (after the main sponsor Norsk Tipping's betting-game called Oddsen). The league was from 2016 until 2025 branded as PostNord-ligaen, sponsored by PostNord.

== Current members ==
The following 28 clubs are competing in the 2025 Norwegian Second Division.

Group 1

- Arendal
- Brann 2
- Brattvåg
- Eik Tønsberg
- Fløy
- Jerv
- Lysekloster
- Notodden
- Pors
- Sandnes Ulf
- Sandviken
- Sotra
- Træff
- Vard Haugesund

Group 2

- Alta
- Asker
- Eidsvold Turn
- Follo
- Grorud
- Hønefoss
- Kjelsås
- Levanger
- Rana
- Stjørdals-Blink
- Strindheim
- Strømmen
- Tromsdalen
- Ull/Kisa

== Winners ==
=== 1991–1995 ===
All group winners, excluding second teams of top division teams, were promoted to 1. divisjon.

Season	Group 1	Group 2	Group 3	Group 4	Group 5	Group 6
1991	Odd	Bærum	Vard Haugesund	Brann 2 (Note: Os were promoted)	Rosenborg 2 (Note: Stjørdals/Blink were promoted)	Bodø/Glimt
1992	Lillestrøm 2 (Note: Ski were promoted)	Skeid	Åssiden	Åsane	Nardo	Mjølner
1993	Jevnaker	Åndalsnes	Stabæk	Vidar	Stjørdals-Blink	Alta
1994	Sarpsborg FK	Odd Grenland	Sandefjord BK	Haugesund	Aalesund	Stålkameratene
1995	Elverum	Ullern	Mjøndalen	Vidar	Byåsen	Harstad

=== 1996–2000 ===
Each group winner played qualification play-offs to decide which teams promote to 1. divisjon. Teams in bold promoted to 1. divisjon through qualification play-offs.

Season	Group 1	Group 2	Group 3	Group 4	Group 5	Group 6	Group 7	Group 8
1996 (Note: Byåsen and Harstad from 1. divisjon played qualification games against group winners from 2. divisjon)	**Sarpsborg FK**	Skjetten	**Runar**	Vigør	Rosenborg 2 (Note: Verdal finished second in Group 5 and qualified for promotion play-offs, but was not promoted.)	Finnsnes	—N/a	—N/a
1997	**Kjelsås**	**Raufoss**	**Ullern**	Vidar	Fana	Kolstad	**Strindheim**	Lofoten
1998	**Liv/Fossekallen**	**Skjetten**	Ørn-Horten	Vidar	Fyllingen	**Clausenengen**	Rosenborg 2 (Note: Mo finished second in Group 7 and qualified for promotion play-offs, but was not promoted.)	**Lofoten**
1999	**HamKam**	Asker	**Sandefjord**	Vidar	Fyllingen	Aalesund	**Strindheim**	**Tromsdalen**
2000	Skjetten	FF Lillehammer	**Ørn-Horten**	**Mandalskameratene**	**Hødd**	**Aalesund**	Stålkameratene	Lofoten

=== 2001–2016 ===
All group winners, excluding second teams of top division teams, were promoted to 1. divisjon.

Season	Group 1	Group 2	Group 3	Group 4
2001	Skeid	Åsane	Oslo Øst	Lørenskog
2002	Fredrikstad	Bærum	Mandalskameratene	Alta
2003	Pors Grenland	Kongsvinger	Vard Haugesund	Tromsdalen
2004	FK Tønsberg	Follo	Løv-Ham	Alta
2005	Sparta Sarpsborg	Oslo Øst	Viking 2 (Note: Haugesund finished second in Group 3 and was promoted)	Tromsdalen
2006	Notodden	Skeid	Mandalskameratene	Raufoss
2007	Nybergsund	Hødd	Sandnes Ulf	Alta
2008	Mjøndalen	Skeid	Stavanger	Tromsdalen
2009	Strømmen	Follo	Sandnes Ulf	Ranheim
2010	Asker	Hødd	Randaberg	HamKam
2011	Ullensaker/Kisa	Bærum	Notodden	Tromsdalen
2012	Elverum	Kristiansund	Vard Haugesund	Follo
2013	Bærum	Alta	Nest-Sotra	Tromsdalen
2014	Jerv	Levanger	Åsane	Follo
2015	KFUM	Raufoss	Ullensaker/Kisa	Kongsvinger
2016	Tromsdalen	Elverum	Florø	Arendal

=== 2017– ===
Teams in bold were promoted to 1. divisjon.
Teams in italics were relegated to 2. divisjon.

Season	Group 1	Group 2	Play-off teams
2017	Ham-Kam	Nest-Sotra	Fredrikstad (1. div), Raufoss (2. div, gr. 1), **Notodden** (2. div, gr. 2)
2018	Raufoss	Skeid	Åsane (1. div), Fredrikstad (2. div, gr. 1), **KFUM Oslo** (2. div, gr. 2)
2019	Stjørdals-Blink	Grorud	Notodden (1. div), Kvik Halden (2. div, gr. 1), **Åsane** (2. div, gr. 2)
2020	Fredrikstad	Bryne	Stjørdals-Blink (1. div), Skeid (2. div, gr. 1), Asker (2. div, gr. 2)
2021	Kongsvinger	Skeid	Stjørdals-Blink (1. div), Hødd (2. div, gr. 1), Arendal (2. div, gr. 2)
2022	Moss	Hødd	Skeid (1. div), Arendal (2. div, gr. 1), Ull/Kisa (2. div, gr. 2)
2023	Egersund	Levanger	Hødd (1. div), **Lyn** (2. div, gr. 1), Tromsdalen (2. div, gr. 2)
2024	Hødd	Skeid	Mjøndalen (1. div), Jerv (2. div, gr. 1), Tromsdalen (2. div, gr. 2)
2025	Sandnes Ulf	Strømmen	Moss (1. div), Brattvåg (2. div, gr. 1), Grorud (2. div, gr. 2)

== Reserve teams ==
Reserve teams of clubs from the two top divisions can participate in the 2. divisjon. Reserve teams of clubs from the 1. divisjon can not play in the 2. divisjon, so if a team is relegated from the 1. divisjon, the club's reserve team will be relegated to the 3. divisjon regardless of their final position in the league.

== Sponsorship ==
From 2016 until 2025 the 2. divisjon had its title sponsorship rights sold to PostNord.

Period	Sponsor	Name
1963–1990	No sponsor	3. divisjon
1991–2008	No sponsor	2. divisjon
2009–2011	No sponsor	Fair Play ligaen
2012–2015	Norsk Tipping	Oddsen-ligaen
2016–2025	PostNord	PostNord-ligaen
2026–	No sponsor	2. divisjon

== Records and statistics ==
=== Team records ===
==== 2001–2016 ====
4 groups
Record	Team	Season
Most points	70 (Kongsvinger)	2003
Fewest points	3 (Stord and Skjervøy)	2001 and 2003
Most goals in one season	105 (Tromsdalen)	2011
Fewest goals in one season	18 (Langevåg)	2003
Most goals conceded in one season	130 (Skjervøy)	2003
Fewest goals conceded in one season	13 (Elverum)	2016
Most goals in one game	15–0 (Strindheim – Salangen); 15–0 (Sparta Sarpsborg – Fram Larvik)	2004; 2005
Biggest win	15–0 (Strindheim – Salangen); 15–0 (Sparta Sarpsborg – Fram Larvik)	2004; 2005

==== 2017– ====
2 groups
Record	Team	Season
Most points	65 (HamKam)	2017
Fewest points	13 (Byåsen)	2017
Most goals in one season	66 (Åsane)	2019
Fewest goals in one season	21 (Brumunddal)	2017
Most goals conceded in one season	69 (Odd 2 and Stabæk 2)	2017 and 2018
Fewest goals conceded in one season	18 (HamKam)	2017
Most goals in one game	5–5 (Bærum – Oppsal)	2019
Biggest win	8–0 (Raufoss – Follo)	2017

=== Average attendances ===
Season	Average
2014	258
2015	285
2016	262
2017	350
2018	493
2019	474

=== Top ten most attended games ===
No.	Season	Game	Attendance
1	2018	Fredrikstad–Moss	10 413
2	2019	Fredrikstad–Byåsen	7 912
3	2002	Fredrikstad–Kvik Halden	7 013
4	2018	Fredrikstad–Asker	5 691
5	2002	Fredrikstad–Eidsvold Turn	5 370
6	2003	Kongsvinger–Ullensaker/Kisa	5 024
7	2010	Hamarkameratene–Brumunddal	4 565
8	2019	Fredrikstad–Kvik Halden	4 462
9	2018	Fredrikstad–Raufoss	4 291
10	2019	Fredrikstad–Stjørdals-Blink	4 245
