= 1999 Molde FK season =

Molde
1999 season
- Chairman: Nils Olav Kringstad
- Head coach: Erik Brakstad
- Stadium: Molde Stadion
- Tippeligaen: 2nd
- Norwegian Cup: Semi-final vs. Brann
- UEFA Champions League: Group stage
- Top goalscorer: League: Andreas Lund (21); All: Andreas Lund (39)
- Highest home attendance: 12,914 vs Rosenborg (24 May 1999)
- Lowest home attendance: 530 vs Sunndal (8 June 1999)
- Average home league attendance: 7,163

The 1999 season was Molde's 24th season in the top flight of Norwegian football. This season Molde competed in Tippeligaen, the Norwegian Cup and the UEFA Champions League.

In Tippeligaen, Molde finished in 2nd position, 6 points behind winners Rosenborg.

Molde participated in the 2000 Norwegian Cup. They defeated Spjelkavik, Sunndal, Strindheim, Kjelsås on their way to the quarterfinal where they defeated Lillestrøm with 3–0 at home. On 3 October 2000, Molde lost the semifinal vs. Brann at home with the score 3–4 after extra time.

In the UEFA Champions League, Molde was drawn against Russian team CSKA Moscow in the second qualifying round. Molde lost the first leg at away ground with the score 0–2. Molde won the second leg 4–0 at home and advanced to the next round 4–2 on aggregate. In the third and last qualifying round, Molde was drawn against Spanish team Mallorca. The teams played 0–0 in the first leg in Molde. In the second leg, Molde was one goal behind for more than one hour after Jovan Stanković' penalty goal in the 21st minute. In the 84th minute, Andreas Lund scored the equaliser from a penalty kick after Fernando Niño's handball. Niño was sent off in the situation which led to the penalty. The game ended with a 1–1 draw which sent Molde through to the Champions League group stage for the first time in the club's history. The second leg against Mallorca has since often been referred to as Miracle on Mallorca.

== Squad ==
Note: Flags indicate national team as defined under FIFA eligibility rules; some limited exceptions apply. Players may hold more than one non-FIFA nationality.

No.	Pos.	Nation	Player
1	GK	NOR	Morten Bakke
2	DF	SWE	Dennis Schiller
3	DF	NOR	Petter Christian Singsaas
4	DF	NOR	Pål Lydersen
5	DF	NOR	Knut Anders Fostervold (Captain)
6	MF	NOR	Daniel Berg Hestad
7	FW	NOR	Jo Tessem
8	MF	NOR	Karl Oskar Fjørtoft
9	FW	NOR	Andreas Lund
10	MF	NOR	Odd Inge Olsen
11	MF	NOR	André Schei Lindbæk

No.	Pos.	Nation	Player
12	GK	NOR	Are Lervik
13	GK	NOR	Knut Dørum Lillebakk
14	MF	NOR	Thomas Mork
15	DF	NOR	Freddy dos Santos
16	MF	NOR	Magne Hoseth
17	DF	NOR	Trond Strande
18	MF	NOR	Svein Tore Brandshaug
19	MF	NOR	Anders Hasselgård
20	FW	NOR	Ole Bjørn Sundgot
23	MF	NOR	Torgeir Ruud Ramsli
24	FW	NOR	Bernt Hulsker

As of end of season.

== Friendlies ==
9 January 1999	Molde	2 – 1	Hødd	Ålesund
CET (UTC+1)	Goal	Report	Goal	Stadium: Sunnmørshallen

14 January 1999	Molde	3 – 0	Moss	Ålesund
CET (UTC+1)	Goal	Report		Stadium: Sunnmørshallen

16 January 1999	Molde	2 – 1	Stabæk	Ålesund
CET (UTC+1)	Goal	Report	Goal	Stadium: Sunnmørshallen

23 January 1999	Aalesund	2 – 2	Molde	Ålesund
CET (UTC+1)	Goal	Report	Goal	Stadium: Sunnmørshallen

5 February 1999	Moss	2 – 4	Molde	Fredrikstad
CET (UTC+1)	Goal	Report	Goal	Stadium: Østfoldhallen

15 February 1999	Molde (Norway)	0 – 2	(Sweden) AIK	La Manga, Spain
CET (UTC+1)		Report	Goal

17 February 1999	Molde (Norway)	1 – 2	(Sweden) Örebro	La Manga, Spain
CET (UTC+1)	Goal	Report	Goal

19 February 1999	Molde (Norway)	6 – 0	(Sweden) IFK Göteborg	La Manga, Spain
CET (UTC+1)	Goal	Report

27 February 1999	Molde	4 – 0	Brann	Ålesund
CET (UTC+1)	Goal	Report		Stadium: Sunnmørshallen

8 March 1999	Molde	1 – 1	Haugesund	La Manga, Spain
CET (UTC+1)	Goal	Report	Goal

10 March 1999	Molde	3 – 2	Odd Grenland	La Manga, Spain
CET (UTC+1)	Goal	Report	Goal

12 March 1999	Molde (Norway)	2 – 3	(Sweden) Kalmar	La Manga, Spain
CET (UTC+1)	Goal	Report	Goal

18 March 1999	Bodø/Glimt	2 – 1	Molde	Bodø
CET (UTC+1)	Goal	Report	Goal	Stadium: Nordlandshallen

27 March 1999	Viking	2 – 0	Molde	Stavanger
CET (UTC+1)	Goal	Report

29 March 1999	Ajax (Netherlands)	2 – 5	(Norway) Molde	Amsterdam, Netherlands
CET (UTC+1)	Goal	Report	Goal

30 March 1999	Vitesse Arnhem (Netherlands)	1 – 2	(Norway) Molde	Netherlands
CET (UTC+1)	Goal	Report	Goal

6 April 1999	Molde	3 – 1	Lillestrøm	Bryn, Oslo
CET (UTC+1)	Goal	Report	Goal

4 June 1999	Molde (Norway)	2 – 3	(Denmark) AaB
CET (UTC+1)	Goal	Report	Goal

19 July 1999	Molde (Norway)	1 – 1	(England) Southampton
CET (UTC+1)	Goal	Report	Goal

== Competitions ==
=== Tippeligaen ===
==== Results summary ====
Overall								Home						Away					
Pld	W	D	L	GF	GA	GD	Pts	W	D	L	GF	GA	GD	W	D	L	GF	GA	GD
26	16	2	8	49	37	+12	50	9	1	3	29	16	+13	7	1	5	20	21	−1

Last updated: 25 April 2018.

==== Results by round ====
Round	1	2	3	4	5	6	7	8	9	10	11	12	13	14	15	16	17	18	19	20	21	22	23	24	25	26
Ground	H	A	H	A	H	H	A	H	A	H	A	H	A	A	H	A	H	A	A	H	A	H	A	H	A	H
Result	W	W	W	L	W	W	W	L	L	D	D	W	W	W	W	L	W	W	W	L	L	L	L	W	W	W
Position	3	1	1	4	1	1	1	3	4	4	5	5	5	4	2	4	3	2	2	3	4	4	4	4	3	2

Source: see below
A = Away; H = Home; W = Win; D = Draw; L = Loss

==== Results ====
10 April 1999 1	Molde	4 – 0	Tromsø	Molde
16:00 CET (UTC+1)	Lund 18', 70'; Fostervold 26'; Olsen 55'	Report		Stadium: Molde Stadion; Attendance: 7,507; Referee: Roy Helge Olsen

18 April 1999 2	Kongsvinger	2 – 3	Molde	Kongsvinger
18:00 CET (UTC+1)	Adolfsson 12'; Bergman 70'; Rønningen (yellow card); Thórdarson (yellow card)	Report	Rønningen 15' (o.g.); Lund 73', 76' dos Santos (yellow card); Lydersen (yellow card); Olsen (yellow card)	Stadium: Gjemselund Stadion; Attendance: 1,938; Referee: Jon Eilif Skjervold

23 April 1999 3	Molde	2 – 1	Bodø/Glimt	Molde
19:00 CET (UTC+1)	Lund 30' (pen.); Hestad 66'	Report	Eriksen 75'; Staurvik (yellow card)	Stadium: Molde Stadion; Attendance: 6,978; Referee: Terje Hauge

3 May 1999 4	Vålerenga	2 – 0	Molde	Oslo
18:00 CET (UTC+1)	Levernes 24'; Simpson 60'	Report		Stadium: Bislett Stadion; Attendance: 9,509; Referee: Roy Helge Olsen

9 May 1999 5	Molde	3 – 0	Strømsgodset	Molde
18:00 CET (UTC+1)	Fostervold 22'; Tessem 64', 72'	Report	Hagen (yellow card); Michelsen (yellow card); Karlsen (yellow card)	Stadium: Molde Stadion; Attendance: 5,915; Referee: Kjell Alseth

13 May 1999 6	Molde	3 – 0	Skeid	Molde
18:00 CET (UTC+1)	Tessem 31'; Lund 51'; Fjørtoft 69'	Report	Halvorsen (yellow card) (yellow-red card) 80'	Stadium: Molde Stadion; Attendance: 6,820; Referee: Frode Kvam

16 May 1999 7	Brann	0 – 1	Molde	Bergen
20:10 CET (UTC+1)	Ludvigsen (yellow card); Samuelsson (yellow card)	Report	Lund 49'	Stadium: Brann Stadion; Attendance: 16,477; Referee: Tom Henning Øvrebø

24 May 1999 8	Molde	0 – 2	Rosenborg	Molde
21:00 CET (UTC+1)	Strande (yellow card); Hestad (yellow card)	Report	Rushfeldt 26', 43'; Berg (yellow card); Hoftun (yellow card)	Stadium: Molde Stadion; Attendance: 12,914; Referee: Terje Hauge

12 June 1999 10	Molde	0 – 0	Stabæk	Molde
16:00 CET (UTC+1)	Hestad (yellow card)	Report	Stenvoll (yellow card)	Stadium: Molde Stadion; Attendance: 8,156; Referee: Roy Helge Olsen

16 June 1999 11	Odd Grenland	0 – 0	Molde	Skien
19:00 CET (UTC+1)	Rambekk (yellow card)	Report	Strande (yellow card)	Stadium: Odd Stadion; Attendance: 5,038; Referee: Roy Helge Olsen

20 June 1999 12	Molde	3 – 1	Moss	Molde
18:00 CET (UTC+1)	Lund 9', 53', 74'; Fjørtoft (yellow card)	Report	Ophaug 56'	Stadium: Molde Stadion; Attendance: 5,375; Referee: Ivar Ansgar Eriksen

27 June 1999 13	Lillestrøm	0 – 1	Molde	Lillestrøm
18:00 CET (UTC+1)	Normann (yellow card); Holm (yellow card)	Report	Lund 74' (pen.), (yellow card)	Stadium: Åråsen Stadion; Attendance: 4,728; Referee: Tommy Skjerven

3 July 1999 14	Tromsø	1 – 2	Molde	Tromsø
16:00 CET (UTC+1)	Johansen 85'; Helstrup (yellow card)	Report	Lund 74' (pen.); Andersen 88'; Fostervold (yellow card)	Stadium: Alfheim Stadion; Attendance: 3,551; Referee: Terje Hauge

7 July 1999 9	Viking	2 – 1	Molde	Stavanger
19:00 CET (UTC+1)	Berland 14', 29'; Daðason 65'; Hansen 71'	Report	Olsen 9'; Fostervold (yellow card)	Stadium: Stavanger Stadion; Attendance: 5,555; Referee: Kjell Alseth

11 July 1999 15	Molde	3 – 2	Kongsvinger	Molde
18:00 CET (UTC+1)	Lund 11'; Olsen 17'; Hestad 61'; Andersen (yellow card)	Report	Alm 25', 63'; Karlsrud (yellow card); Evensen (yellow card)	Stadium: Molde Stadion; Attendance: 7,843; Referee: Tor-Arne Fiskum

25 July 1999 16	Bodø/Glimt	3 – 1	Molde	Bodø
18:00 CET (UTC+1)	Bergersen 13'; Bjørkan 37'; Hanssen 50'; Berg (yellow card)	Report	Tessem 87'; Sundgot (yellow card); Fostervold (yellow card) (yellow-red card) 53'	Stadium: Aspmyra Stadion; Attendance: 3,429; Referee: Tom Henning Øvrebø

1 August 1999 17	Molde	4 – 3	Vålerenga	Molde
18:00 CET (UTC+1)	Sundgot 7'; Hestad 51'; Lydersen 78' (pen.); Tessem 89'	Report	Musæus 13'; Walltin 54', (yellow card); Thorsen 79'	Stadium: Molde Stadion; Attendance: 6,597; Referee: Roy Helge Olsen

8 August 1999 18	Strømsgodset	0 – 2	Molde	Drammen
18:00 CET (UTC+1)	Olsen (yellow card)	Report	Hoseth 47'; Lund 53'; Hestad (yellow card); Fjørtoft (yellow card)	Stadium: Marienlyst Stadion; Attendance: 4,911; Referee: Jonny Ditlefsen

15 August 1999 19	Skeid	3 – 5	Molde	Oslo
18:00 CET (UTC+1)	Grina 61'; Lindbæk 86'; Noppi 90'; Andersen (yellow card)	Report	Sundgot 5', 38'; Lund 19'; Tessem 44'; Mork 57'	Stadium: Voldsløkka Stadion; Attendance: 1,595; Referee: Roy Helge Olsen

22 August 1999 20	Molde	1 – 3	Brann	Molde
15:30 CET (UTC+1)	Olsen 4'	Report	Guntveit 7'; Moen 35'; Helland 85'	Stadium: Molde Stadion; Attendance: 6,644; Referee: Rune Pedersen

29 August 1999 21	Rosenborg	2 – 1	Molde	Trondheim
20:10 CET (UTC+1)	Hoftun 62'; Sørensen 65'; Carew (yellow card)	Report	Hoseth 40', (yellow card) dos Santos (yellow card); Hestad (yellow card); Mork (yellow card)	Stadium: Lerkendal Stadion; Attendance: 18,874; Referee: Roy Helge Olsen

12 September 1999 22	Molde	3 – 4	Viking	Molde
15:00 CET (UTC+1)	Lund 25', 83'; Hestad 71'	Report	Berland 1', 61'; Daðason 59'; Knudsen 87'; Berre (yellow card)	Stadium: Molde Stadion; Attendance: 5,733; Referee: Jon Eilif Skjervold

18 September 1999 23	Stabæk	4 – 2	Molde	Bærum
16:00 CET (UTC+1)	Belsvik 17' (pen.), 72'; Hanssen 36'; Flem 69'; Holter (yellow card); Linderoth (yellow card)	Report	Lund 4' (pen.), 37'; Fostervold (yellow card) (yellow-red card) 53'	Stadium: Nadderud Stadion; Attendance: 2,825; Referee: Roy Helge Olsen

13 October 1999 24	Molde	1 – 0	Odd Grenland	Molde
19:00 CET (UTC+1)	Singsaas 76'	Report	Aas (yellow card)	Stadium: Molde Stadion; Attendance: 4,500; Referee: Terje Hauge

17 October 1999 25	Moss	0 – 1	Molde	Moss
13:00 CET (UTC+1)	Trondsen (yellow card); Enerly (yellow card); Olofsson (yellow card)	Report	Lund 20'; Strande (yellow card)	Stadium: Melløs Stadion; Attendance: 3,310; Referee: Tom Henning Øvrebø

23 October 1999 26	Molde	2 – 0	Lillestrøm	Molde
14:30 CET (UTC+1)	Lund 8'; Lindbæk 74'; Singsaas (yellow card); Hestad (yellow card)	Report	Hansén (yellow card)	Stadium: Molde Stadion; Attendance: 8,140; Referee: Rune Pedersen

==== League table ====
Pos	Team	Pld	W	D	L	GF	GA	GD	Pts	Qualification or relegation
1	Rosenborg (C)	26	18	2	6	75	33	+42	56	Qualification for the Champions League second qualifying round
2	Molde	26	16	2	8	49	37	+12	50	Qualification for the UEFA Cup first round
3	Brann	26	16	1	9	45	40	+5	49	Qualification for the UEFA Cup qualifying round (Note: SK Brann qualified as the runner-up of the 1999 Norwegian Football Cup.)
4	Lillestrøm	26	15	3	8	60	41	+19	48	Qualification for the UEFA Cup qualifying round
5	Stabæk	26	14	4	8	58	49	+9	46	Qualification for the Intertoto Cup first round

Source: fotball.no
Rules for classification: 1) points; 2) goal difference; 3) number of goals scored.
(C) Champions

=== Norwegian Cup ===
28 June 1999 First Round	Spjelkavik	1 – 8	Molde	Spjelkavik
18:30 CEST (UTC+2)	Hakjelsvik 57'		Lund 12', 32', 88'; Mork 30'; Sundgot 36', 60'; Wiss 46'; Olsen 81'	Stadium: Spjelkavik Stadion; Referee: Svein Ivar Aarskog

8 June 1999 Second Round	Molde	6 – 0	Sunndal	Molde
19:00 CEST (UTC+2)	Hestad 32'; Mork 35', 55'; Lund 43', 72'; Olsen 77'			Stadium: Molde Stadion; Attendance: 530; Referee: Sindre Eikrem

23 June 1999 Third Round	Strindheim	1 – 3	Molde	Trondheim
18:00 CEST (UTC+2)	Johnsen 41'		Lund 39' (pen.), 59', 87'; Hestad (yellow card)	Stadium: Lerkendal Stadion; Attendance: 230; Referee: Bjarne Hansen

29 June 1999 Fourth Round	Kjelsås	2 – 3	Molde	Oslo
18:00 CEST (UTC+2)	Brændvang 2'; Berre 38' (pen.)	Report	Lund 4', 19', 81' (pen.)	Stadium: Grefsen Stadion; Attendance: 1,405; Referee: Frode Kvam

25 September 1999 Quarterfinal	Molde	3 – 0	Lillestrøm	Molde
16:00 CEST (UTC+2)	Lund 59'; Olsen 73'; Sundgot 79'			Stadium: Molde Stadion; Attendance: 2,523; Referee: Frode Kvam

3 October 1999 Semifinal	Molde	3 – 4 (a.e.t.)	Brann	Molde
16:00 CEST (UTC+2)	Lund 65', 71'; Lindbæk 72'		Kvisvik 6', 63'; Helstad 90'; Ludvigsen 109'	Stadium: Molde Stadion; Attendance: 5,966; Referee: Roy Helge Olsen

=== UEFA Champions League ===
==== Qualifying rounds ====
28 July 1999 Second qualifying round 1st leg	CSKA Moscow (Russia)	2 – 0	(Norway) Molde	Moscow
18:00 CEST (UTC+2)	Şişchin 7'; Khomukha 85'	Report	Strande (yellow card) 72'; Olsen (yellow card) 84'	Stadium: Dynamo Stadium; Attendance: 15,000; Referee: Manuel Mejuto González, Spain

4 August 1999 Second qualifying round 2nd leg	Molde (Norway)	4 – 0 (4 – 2 agg.)	(Russia) CSKA Moscow	Molde
18:00 CEST (UTC+2)	Tessem 48'; Hestad 65'; Hoseth 67', 81'	Report	Yevgeni Varlamov (yellow card) 20'; Hollý (red card) 55'; Bokov (yellow card) 86'; Aksyonov (yellow card) 87'	Stadium: Molde Stadion; Attendance: 5,203; Referee: Gary Willard, England

11 August 1999 Third qualifying round 1st leg	Molde (Norway)	0 – 0	(Spain) Mallorca	Molde
20:00 CEST (UTC+2)		Report		Stadium: Molde Stadion; Attendance: 8,573; Referee: Mario van der Ende, Netherlands

25 August 1999 Third qualifying round 2nd leg	Mallorca (Spain)	1 – 1 (1 – 1 agg.)	(Norway) Molde	Palma, Mallorca
21:30 CEST (UTC+2)	Jovan Stanković 21' (pen.); Siviero (yellow card) 34'; Ariel Ibagaza (yellow card) 54'; Niño (red card) 83'	Report	Lund 84' (pen.)	Stadium: Son Moix Stadium; Attendance: 23,000; Referee: Stefano Braschi, Italy
Note: Molde won on away goals

==== Group stage ====
15 September 1999 1	Molde (Norway)	0 – 1	(Portugal) Porto	Molde
20:45 CEST (UTC+2)		Report	Costa (yellow card) 51'; Deco (yellow card) 72', (goal) 89'; Peixe (yellow card) 77'	Stadium: Molde Stadion; Attendance: 8,739; Referee: Alain Hamer, Luxembourg

21 September 1999 2	Real Madrid (Spain)	4 – 1	(Norway) Molde	Madrid
20:45 CEST (UTC+2)	Morientes 27'; Sávio 60', 70' (pen.); Guti 81'	Report	Lydersen (yellow card) 18'; Strande (yellow card) 68'; Lindbæk 80'	Stadium: Santiago Bernabéu Stadium; Attendance: 15,000; Referee: Hartmut Strampe, Germany

28 September 1999 3	Olympiacos (Greece)	3 – 1	(Norway) Molde	Athens
21:45 CEST (UTC+2)	Giovanni 16', 70'; Amanatidis (yellow card) 45'; Luciano 77'	Report	Strande (yellow card) 27'; Lund 58'	Stadium: Olympic Stadium; Attendance: 40,299; Referee: Ľuboš Micheľ, Slovakia

20 October 1999 4	Molde (Norway)	3 – 2	(Greece) Olympiacos	Molde
20:45 CEST (UTC+2)	Lund 54', 59'; Hestad 72'	Report	Mavrogenidis 36'; Zahovič 40'; Passalis (yellow card) 70'; Giovanni (yellow card) 83'	Stadium: Molde Stadion; Attendance: 10,230; Referee: Ryszard Wójcik, Poland

26 October 1999 5	Porto (Portugal)	3 – 1	(Norway) Molde	Porto
19:45 CEST (UTC+2)	Deco 1', 28'; Jardel 58'	Report	Hestad 82'	Stadium: Estádio das Antas; Attendance: 26,000; Referee: Graham Barber, England

3 November 1999 6	Molde (Norway)	0 – 1	(Spain) Real Madrid	Molde
20:45 CEST (UTC+2)		Report	Karembeu 42'; Helguera (yellow card) 77'	Stadium: Molde Stadion; Attendance: 10,705; Referee: Gilles Veissière, France

Pos	Team	Pld	W	D	L	GF	GA	GD	Pts	Qualification	RMA	POR	OLY	MOL
1	(Spain) Real Madrid	6	4	1	1	15	7	+8	13	Advance to second group stage	—	3–1	3–0	4–1
2	(Portugal) Porto	6	4	0	2	9	6	+3	12	Advance to second group stage	2–1	—	2–0	3–1
3	(Greece) Olympiacos	6	2	1	3	9	12	−3	7	Transfer to UEFA Cup	3–3	1–0	—	3–1
4	(Norway) Molde	6	1	0	5	6	14	−8	3		0–1	0–1	3–2	—

Source: UEFA

== Squad statistics ==
The statistics include competitive matches only.

=== Appearances and goals ===
No.	Pos	Nat	Player	Total		Tippeligaen		Norwegian Cup		UEFA Champions League	
No.	Pos	Nat	Player	Apps	Goals	Apps	Goals	Apps	Goals	Apps	Goals
1	GK	(Norway) NOR	Morten Bakke	42	0	26	0	6	0	10	0
2	DF	(Sweden) SWE	Dennis Schiller	6	0	1+3	0	0+2	0	0	0
3	DF	(Norway) NOR	Petter Christian Singsaas	23	1	8+4	1	3+2	0	3+3	0
4	DF	(Norway) NOR	Pål Lydersen	24	1	14	1	2	0	8	0
5	DF	(Norway) NOR	Knut Anders Fostervold	38	2	24	2	5	0	9	0
6	MF	(Norway) NOR	Daniel Berg Hestad	41	8	25	4	6	1	10	3
7	FW	(Norway) NOR	Jo Tessem	41	7	26	6	5	0	10	1
8	MF	(Norway) NOR	Karl Oskar Fjørtoft	41	1	25	1	6	0	10	0
9	FW	(Norway) NOR	Andreas Lund	40	39	24	21	6	14	10	4
10	MF	(Norway) NOR	Odd Inge Olsen	42	7	26	4	5+1	3	10	0
11	FW	(Norway) NOR	André Schei Lindbæk	12	3	3+2	1	2	1	1+4	1
12	GK	(Norway) NOR	Are Lervik	1	0	0	0	0+1	0	0	0
14	MF	(Norway) NOR	Thomas Mork	38	4	9+15	1	3+1	3	6+4	0
15	DF	(Norway) NOR	Freddy dos Santos	33	0	15+6	0	1+2	0	4+5	0
16	MF	(Norway) NOR	Magne Hoseth	28	4	10+4	2	2+3	0	7+2	2
17	DF	(Norway) NOR	Trond Strande	35	0	19+2	0	6	0	8	0
18	MF	(Norway) NOR	Svein Tore Brandshaug	3	0	0+3	0	0	0	0	0
19	MF	(Norway) NOR	Anders Hasselgård	9	0	7	0	0+2	0	0	0
20	FW	(Norway) NOR	Ole Bjørn Sundgot	32	6	20	3	3+1	3	2+6	0
21	MF	(Norway) NOR	Torgeir Ruud Ramsli	1	0	0+1	0	0	0	0	0
24	FW	(Norway) NOR	Bernt Hulsker	2	0	0+2	0	0	0	0	0
Players away from Molde on loan:
Players who left Molde during the season:
11	MF	(Norway) NOR	Trond Andersen	23	1	17	1	4	0	2	0
24	MF	(Finland) FIN	Jarkko Wiss	4	1	0+3	0	1	1	0	0

=== Goalscorers ===
Rank	Position	Nat.	No.	Player	Tippeligaen	Norwegian Cup	UEFA Champions League	Total
1	FW	(Norway)	9	Andreas Lund	21	14	4	39
2	MF	(Norway)	6	Daniel Berg Hestad	4	1	3	8
3	FW	(Norway)	7	Jo Tessem	6	0	1	7
3	MF	(Norway)	10	Odd Inge Olsen	4	3	0	7
5	FW	(Norway)	20	Ole Bjørn Sundgot	3	3	0	6
6	MF	(Norway)	16	Magne Hoseth	2	0	2	4
6	MF	(Norway)	14	Thomas Mork	1	3	0	4
8	FW	(Norway)	11	André Schei Lindbæk	1	1	1	3
9	DF	(Norway)	5	Knut Anders Fostervold	2	0	0	2
11	DF	(Norway)	3	Petter Christian Singsaas	1	0	0	1
11	DF	(Norway)	4	Pål Lydersen	1	0	0	1
11	MF	(Norway)	8	Karl Oskar Fjørtoft	1	0	0	1
11	MF	(Norway)	11	Trond Andersen	1	0	0	1
11	MF	(Finland)	24	Jarkko Wiss	0	1	0	1
				Own goals	1	0	0	1
				TOTALS	49	26	11	86

== See also ==
- Molde FK seasons
