= 2000 Molde FK season =

Molde
2000 season
- Head coach: Erik Brakstad
- Stadium: Molde Stadion
- Tippeligaen: 7th
- Norwegian Cup: Quarter-final vs. Start
- UEFA Cup: First Round vs. Rayo Vallecano
- Top goalscorer: League: Magne Hoseth (15); All: Magne Hoseth (16)
- Highest home attendance: 11,167 vs Rosenborg (12 July 2000)
- Lowest home attendance: 3,348 vs Rayo Vallecano (14 September 2000)
- Average home league attendance: 6,816

The 2000 season was Molde's 25th season in the top flight of Norwegian football. This season Molde competed in Tippeligaen, the Norwegian Cup and the UEFA Cup.

In Tippeligaen, Molde finished in 7th position, 14 points behind winners Rosenborg, but only five points behind third placed Viking.

Molde participated in the 2000 Norwegian Cup. They defeated Tornado Måløy and Brann, both away from home, on their way to the quarterfinal. On 6 September 2000, Molde initially won the quarterfinal 4-3 at away ground against Start. However, Start went through to the semifinal after protesting Molde's use of ineligible player Martin Andresen, who was not listed at the referee's card.

In the UEFA Cup, Molde was drawn against Spanish team Rayo Vallecano in the 1st round. Molde lost the first leg at home at Molde Stadion with the score 0–1. Petter Rudi missed a penalty in the 58th minute. The second leg in Spain ended in a 1–1 draw which resulted in a 1–2 loss on aggregate and elimination from the 2000–01 UEFA Cup.

== Squad ==
Note: Flags indicate national team as defined under FIFA eligibility rules; some limited exceptions apply. Players may hold more than one non-FIFA nationality.

No.	Pos.	Nation	Player
1	GK	NOR	Morten Bakke
2	DF	NOR	Roger Nilsen
3	DF	NOR	Petter Christian Singsaas
4	DF	NOR	Fredrik Kjølner
5	DF	NOR	Knut Anders Fostervold
6	MF	NOR	Daniel Berg Hestad (Captain)
7	FW	AUS	Clayton Zane
8	MF	NOR	Karl Oskar Fjørtoft
10	MF	NOR	Odd Inge Olsen
11	MF	NOR	André Schei Lindbæk
12	GK	NOR	Are Lervik
13	GK	NOR	Knut Dørum Lillebakk
14	MF	NOR	Thomas Mork

No.	Pos.	Nation	Player
15	DF	NOR	Freddy dos Santos
16	MF	NOR	Magne Hoseth
17	DF	NOR	Trond Strande
19	MF	NOR	Anders Hasselgård
20	FW	NOR	Bernt Hulsker
21	MF	NOR	Torgeir Ruud Ramsli
22	DF	NOR	Ståle Rønningen
23	MF	NOR	Johnny Hansen
24	MF	NOR	Petter Rudi
30	DF	NOR	Erlend Ormbostad
32	FW	NOR	Nils Gunnar Thomle
38	MF	NOR	Tor Einar Leira
—	FW	NOR	Stig Arild Råket

As of end of season.

== Competitions ==
=== Tippeligaen ===
==== Results summary ====
Overall								Home						Away					
Pld	W	D	L	GF	GA	GD	Pts	W	D	L	GF	GA	GD	W	D	L	GF	GA	GD
26	11	7	8	46	47	−1	40	4	4	5	24	25	−1	7	3	3	22	22	0

Last updated: 20 April 2018.

==== Results by round ====
Round	1	2	3	4	5	6	7	8	9	10	11	12	13	14	15	16	17	18	19	20	21	22	23	24	25	26
Ground	A	H	H	A	H	A	H	A	H	A	H	A	H	H	A	A	H	A	H	A	H	A	H	A	H	A
Result	D	W	D	W	W	D	D	D	W	W	L	L	L	L	W	W	L	L	D	W	W	W	D	W	L	L
Position	7	5	6	4	2	2	3	4	4	3	4	5	5	8	7	7	7	8	8	7	6	5	6	5	7	7

Source: see below
A = Away; H = Home; W = Win; D = Draw; L = Loss

==== Results ====
9 April 2000 1	Lillestrøm	1 – 1	Molde	Lillestrøm
18:00 CET (UTC+1)	Bjarmann 18'; Werni (yellow card)	Report	Olsen 34'; Singsaas (yellow card); Strande (yellow card)	Stadium: Åråsen Stadion; Attendance: 6,123; Referee: Rune Pedersen

16 April 2000 2	Molde	2 – 1	Haugesund	Molde
18:00 CET (UTC+1)	Hasselgård 42'; Nilsen 64'; Olsen (yellow card)	Report	Berggren 31'; Mogren (red card); Eid (yellow card)	Stadium: Molde Stadion; Attendance: 6,681; Referee: Frode Kvam, Strindheim

19 April 2000 3	Molde	0 – 0	Viking	Molde
18:00 CET (UTC+1)	Fjørtoft (yellow card); Olsen (yellow card)	Report		Stadium: Molde Stadion; Attendance: 6,715; Referee: Kjell Alseth, Stjørdals-Blink

29 April 2000 4	Rosenborg	0 – 1	Molde	Trondheim
19:00 CET (UTC+1)	Hoftun (yellow card) 8'; Bragstad (yellow card); Carew (yellow card); Hernes (yellow card)	Report	Hasselgård 8'; Fjørtoft (yellow card); Hoseth (yellow card); Hulsker (yellow card); Kjølner (yellow card); Olsen (yellow card)	Stadium: Lerkendal Stadion; Attendance: 13,940; Referee: Roy Helge Olsen, Flekkerøy

3 May 2000 5	Molde	3 – 2	Odd Grenland	Molde
18:00 CET (UTC+1)	Hestad 22'; Mork 31', (yellow card); Hulsker 42', (yellow card)	Report	Fevang 5'; Hoff 62'	Stadium: Molde Stadion; Attendance: 6,008; Referee: Tor Arne Fiskum, Bossmo & Ytteren

7 May 2000 6	Start	2 – 2	Molde	Kristiansand
18:00 CET (UTC+1)	Bjønsaas 81', (yellow card); Andreas Ottosson 90', (yellow card); Ohr (yellow card); Sørli (yellow card)	Report	Hoseth 38'; Hestad 89'; Fostervold (red card); Strande (yellow card) dos Santos (yellow card)	Stadium: Kristiansand Stadion; Attendance: 4,600; Referee: Frode Kvam, Strindheim

10 May 2000 7	Molde	3 – 3	Tromsø	Molde
19:00 CET (UTC+1)	Hoseth 32'; Fjørtoft 38'; Lindbæk 51'; Singsaas (yellow card); Strande (yellow card)	Report	Lange 27'; Berntsen 42'; Gudmundsson 54'; Fermann (yellow card); Hafstad (yellow card)	Stadium: Molde Stadion; Attendance: 5,515; Referee: Jon Eilif Skjervold, Fram

13 May 2000 8	Bodø/Glimt	2 – 2	Molde	Bodø
16:00 CET (UTC+1)	Bjørkan 4'; Eriksen 66'	Report	Hoseth 34', (yellow card); Fjørtoft 82'; Singsaas (yellow card)	Stadium: Aspmyra Stadion; Attendance: 3,195; Referee: Per Ivar Staberg

16 May 2000 9	Molde	2 – 1	Vålerenga	Molde
20:10 CET (UTC+1)	Hoseth 75'; Lindbæk 90'; Fostervold (yellow card)	Report	Viljugrein 34', (yellow card); Rekdal (yellow card)	Stadium: Molde Stadion; Attendance: 8,041; Referee: Terje Hauge, Olsvik

21 May 2000 10	Bryne	1 – 3	Molde	Bryne
18:00 CET (UTC+1)	Soma 23'; Stokkeland (yellow card)	Report	Lindbæk 1'; Hoseth 60'; Olsen 87'; Strande (yellow card)	Stadium: Bryne Stadion; Attendance: 3,466; Referee: Terje Hauge, Olsvik

2 July 2000 11	Molde	0 – 3	Moss	Molde
17:00 CET (UTC+1)	Olsen (yellow card)	Report	Wiss 43'; Enerly 68'; Månsson 82'; Juliussen (yellow card); Tangen (yellow card); Brenne (yellow card)	Stadium: Molde Stadion; Attendance: 5,910; Referee: Kjell Alseth

5 July 2000 12	Stabæk	6 – 1	Molde	Bærum
19:00 CET (UTC+1)	Belsvik 4', 14'; Finstad 23', 79'; Wilhelmsson 38', 52'; Ackon (yellow card)	Report	Hoseth 29', (yellow card)	Stadium: Nadderud Stadion; Attendance: 3,220; Referee: Rune Pedersen, Sprint-Jeløy

12 July 2000 17	Molde	0 – 1	Rosenborg	Molde
20:05 CET (UTC+1)	Bakke (yellow card)	Report	Strand 6'	Stadium: Molde Stadion; Attendance: 11,167; Referee: Tom Henning Øvrebø, Nordstrand

17 July 2000 14	Molde	0 – 2	Lillestrøm	Molde
20:45 CET (UTC+1)	dos Santos (yellow card)	Report	Sundgot 18', 63'	Stadium: Molde Stadion; Attendance: 7,435; Referee: Terje Hauge, Olsvik

23 July 2000 15	Haugesund	2 – 4	Molde	Haugesund
18:00 CET (UTC+1)	Blomquist 51', 57'	Report	Hoseth 66'; Hulsker 68', (yellow card); Lindbæk 80'; Andresen 90'	Stadium: Haugesund Stadion; Attendance: 2,802; Referee: Tommy Skjerven, Kaupanger

26 July 2000 13	Molde	1 – 3	Brann	Molde
19:00 CET (UTC+1)	Fostervold 35'	Report	Helstad 25', 75'; Wassberg 41'	Stadium: Molde Stadion; Attendance: 9,468; Referee: Tom Henning Øvrebø, Nordstrand

30 July 2000 16	Viking	0 – 1	Molde	Stavanger
18:00 CET (UTC+1)		Report	Hulsker 51', (yellow card)	Stadium: Stavanger Stadion; Attendance: 5,695; Referee: Jonny Ditlefsen, Gruben

6 August 2000 18	Odd Grenland	3 – 0	Molde	Skien
18:00 CET (UTC+1)	Nornes 39'; Deila 53'; Larsen 90'	Report	Nilsen (red card); Singsaas (yellow card); Olsen (yellow card)	Stadium: Odd Stadion; Attendance: 5,722; Referee: Bjørn Hansen, Kolbotn

13 August 2000 19	Molde	3 – 3	Start	Molde
18:00 CET (UTC+1)	Hoseth 15'; Fjørtoft 81', (yellow card); Hulsker 82'	Report	Ohr 12', 51'; Sørli 54'	Stadium: Molde Stadion; Attendance: 5,382; Referee: Jon Eilif Skjervold, Fram

20 August 2000 20	Tromsø	0 – 1	Molde	Tromsø
20:05 CET (UTC+1)	Gudmundsson (yellow card); Kræmer (yellow card)	Report	Hoseth 67'; Singsaas (red card); Hestad (yellow card); Strande (yellow card)	Stadium: Alfheim Stadion; Attendance: 5,382; Referee: Kjell Alseth, Stjørdals-Blink

27 August 2000 21	Molde	7 – 1	Bodø/Glimt	Molde
18:00 CET (UTC+1)	Hulsker 15', 59', 68'; Hoseth 17', 20'; Fjørtoft 55'; Bakke 74' (pen.)	Report	Bergersen 44'; Evjen (yellow card)	Stadium: Molde Stadion; Attendance: 5,425; Referee: Tommy Skjerven, Kaupanger

10 September 2000 22	Vålerenga	1 – 5	Molde	Oslo
16:00 CET (UTC+1)	Levernes 89'	Report	Olsen 19'; Hoseth 41', 68', 75'; Hestad 47'	Stadium: Ullevaal Stadion; Attendance: 6,141; Referee: Rune Pedersen

17 September 2000 23	Molde	1 – 1	Bryne	Molde
16:00 CET (UTC+1)	Hoseth 80'	Report	Bjørnsen 90'; Hjelmhaug (yellow card)	Stadium: Molde Stadion; Attendance: 5,444; Referee: Terje Hauge, Olsvik

1 October 2000 24	Moss	0 – 1	Molde	Moss
15:00 CET (UTC+1)		Report	Nilsen 84'; Rudi (yellow card); Hulsker (yellow card); Olsen (yellow card)	Stadium: Melløs Stadion; Attendance: 2,085; Referee: Jonny Ditlefsen, Gruben

14 October 2000 25	Molde	0 – 1	Stabæk	Molde
15:00 CET (UTC+1)	Lindbæk 11', 59', (yellow card)	Report	Wilhelmsson 22', 42'; Michelsen 63'; Stenvoll 81'	Stadium: Molde Stadion; Attendance: 5,418; Referee: Rune Pedersen, Sprint-Jeløy

22 October 2000 26	Brann	4 – 0	Molde	Bergen
14:00 CET (UTC+1)	Karadas 6', 57'; Helstad 36', 58'	Report	Nilsen (red card) dos Santos (yellow card)	Stadium: Brann Stadion; Attendance: 17,681; Referee: Rune Pedersen

==== League table ====
Pos	Team	Pld	W	D	L	GF	GA	GD	Pts	Qualification or relegation
5	Stabæk	26	12	6	8	59	33	+26	42	
6	Lillestrøm	26	11	7	8	42	29	+13	40	
7	Molde	26	11	7	8	46	47	−1	40	
8	Odd Grenland	26	11	5	10	40	31	+9	38	Qualification for the UEFA Cup first round (Note: Odd Grenland qualified as the winner of the 2000 Norwegian Cup.)
9	Moss	26	8	8	10	38	44	−6	32	

Source: fotball.no
Rules for classification: 1) points; 2) goal difference; 3) number of goals scored.

=== Norwegian Cup ===
Because of competing of the national team at the UEFA Euro 2000, the 14 teams from Tippeligaen received a bye to the third round.

28 June 2000 Third Round	Tornado Måløy	0 – 5	Molde	Måløy
18:00 CEST (UTC+2)	Rutledal (yellow card); Iversen (yellow card)	Report	Eikrem 34' (o.g.); Hulsker 46', 65', 85'; Hoseth 71'; Hasselgård (yellow card)	Stadium: Refvik Stadion; Attendance: 600; Referee: Bjørn Gravdal, Kolbotn

20 July 2000 Fourth Round	Molde	3 – 0	Brann	Molde
20:15 CEST (UTC+2)	Lund (yellow card) 8'; Hulsker 13', 20', 66' (yellow card) 50'; Olsen (yellow card)	Report	Kvisvik (yellow card) 14'; Moen (yellow card) 62'	Stadium: Molde Stadion; Attendance: 7,448; Referee: Kjell Alseth, Stjørdals-Blink

6 September 2000 Quarterfinal	Start	3 – 4	Molde	Kristiansand
19:00 CEST (UTC+2)	Ottosson 25'; Kloster 35'; Terje Leonardsen 87'	Report	Olsen 3', 37', 62'; Rudi 55' (yellow card); Hestad (yellow card)	Stadium: Kristiansand Stadion; Attendance: 4,438; Referee: Kjell Alseth, Stjørdals-Blink

=== UEFA Cup ===
==== First round ====
14 September 2000 First round 1st leg	Molde (Norway)	0 – 1	(Spain) Rayo Vallecano	Molde
19:30 CET (UTC+1)	Singsaas (yellow card) 17'; Hulsker (yellow card) 56'	Summary	Garcia (yellow card) 7'; Bolo 14'; Ballesteros (yellow card) 35'; Poschner (yellow card) 65'; Urbano (yellow card) 68'	Stadium: Molde Stadion; Attendance: 3,348

28 September 2000 First round 2nd leg	Rayo Vallecano (Spain)	1 – 1 (2 – 1 agg.)	(Norway) Molde	Madrid
21:00 CET (UTC+1)	Míchel 37' (pen.); Quevedo (yellow card) 67'	Summary	Hulsker 74'; Hestad (yellow card) 76'; Karl Oskar Fjørtoft (yellow card) 90'	Stadium: Estadio Teresa Rivero

== Squad statistics ==
=== Appearances and goals ===
No.	Pos	Nat	Player	Total		Tippeligaen		Norwegian Cup		UEFA Cup	
No.	Pos	Nat	Player	Apps	Goals	Apps	Goals	Apps	Goals	Apps	Goals
1	GK	(Norway) NOR	Morten Bakke	31	1	26	1	3	0	2	0
2	DF	(Norway) NOR	Roger Nilsen	15	2	12	2	1+1	0	0+1	0
3	DF	(Norway) NOR	Petter Christian Singsaas	20	0	12+5	0	1	0	2	0
4	DF	(Norway) NOR	Fredrik Kjølner	29	0	22+2	0	3	0	2	0
5	DF	(Norway) NOR	Knut Anders Fostervold	29	1	24	1	3	0	1+1	0
6	MF	(Norway) NOR	Daniel Berg Hestad	31	3	26	3	3	0	2	0
7	FW	(Australia) AUS	Clayton Zane	15	0	4+10	0	1	0	0	0
8	MF	(Norway) NOR	Karl Oskar Fjørtoft	29	4	23+1	4	3	0	2	0
10	MF	(Norway) NOR	Odd Inge Olsen	29	5	24	2	3	3	2	0
11	FW	(Norway) NOR	André Schei Lindbæk	23	6	10+10	6	2	0	0+1	0
14	MF	(Norway) NOR	Thomas Mork	24	1	14+8	1	0+1	0	0+1	0
15	DF	(Norway) NOR	Freddy dos Santos	25	0	17+4	0	2	0	2	0
16	MF	(Norway) NOR	Magne Hoseth	25	16	17+3	15	3	1	2	0
17	DF	(Norway) NOR	Trond Strande	19	0	16	0	2	0	1	0
19	MF	(Norway) NOR	Anders Hasselgård	18	2	11+6	2	0+1	0	0	0
20	FW	(Norway) NOR	Bernt Hulsker	25	14	16+5	7	2	6	2	1
21	MF	(Norway) NOR	Torgeir Ruud Ramsli	6	0	2+3	0	0+1	0	0	0
22	DF	(Norway) NOR	Ståle Rønningen	1	0	0+1	0	0	0	0	0
23	MF	(Norway) NOR	Johnny Hansen	1	0	1	0	0	0	0	0
24	MF	(Norway) NOR	Petter Rudi	6	1	3	0	1	1	2	0
30	DF	(Norway) NOR	Erlend Ormbostad	1	0	0+1	0	0	0	0	0
32	FW	(Norway) NOR	Nils Gunnar Thomle	1	0	1	0	0	0	0	0
	FW	(Norway) NOR	Stig Arild Råket	3	0	0+3	0	0	0	0	0
Players away from Molde on loan:
Players who left Molde during the season:
9	FW	(Norway) NOR	Andreas Lund	5	0	2+1	0	2	0	0	0
23	MF	(Norway) NOR	Martin Andresen	11	1	5+4	1	0+2	0	0	0

=== Goal Scorers ===
Rank	Position	Nat.	No.	Player	Tippeligaen	Norwegian Cup	UEFA Cup	Total
1	MF	(Norway)	16	Magne Hoseth	15	1	0	16
2	FW	(Norway)	20	Bernt Hulsker	7	6	1	14
3	FW	(Norway)	11	André Schei Lindbæk	6	0	0	6
4	MF	(Norway)	10	Odd Inge Olsen	2	3	0	5
5	MF	(Norway)	8	Karl Oskar Fjørtoft	4	0	0	4
6	MF	(Norway)	6	Daniel Berg Hestad	3	0	0	3
7	DF	(Norway)	2	Roger Nilsen	2	0	0	2
7	MF	(Norway)	19	Anders Hasselgård	2	0	0	2
9	GK	(Norway)	1	Morten Bakke	1	0	0	1
9	DF	(Norway)	5	Knut Anders Fostervold	1	0	0	1
9	MF	(Norway)	14	Thomas Mork	1	0	0	1
9	MF	(Norway)	23	Martin Andresen	1	0	0	1
9	MF	(Norway)	24	Petter Rudi	0	1	0	1
				Own Goals	1	1	0	1
				TOTALS	46	12	1	59

== See also ==
- Molde FK seasons
