= 1999 in Norwegian football =

Football in Norway
- Season: 1999

Men's football
- Tippeligaen: Rosenborg
- 1. divisjon: Haugesund
- 2. divisjon: Hamarkameratene (Group 1); Asker (Group 2); Sandefjord (Group 3); Vidar (Group 4); Fyllingen (Group 5); Aalesund (Group 6); Strindheim (Group 7); Tromsdalen (Group 8)
- Cupen: Rosenborg

Women's football
- Toppserien: Asker
- Cupen: Trondheims-Ørn

Results from Norwegian football in 1999.

== Men's football ==
=== League season ===
==== Tippeligaen ====
Pos	Team	Pld	W	D	L	GF	GA	GD	Pts	Qualification or relegation
1	Rosenborg (C)	26	18	2	6	75	33	+42	56	Qualification for the Champions League second qualifying round
2	Molde	26	16	2	8	49	37	+12	50	Qualification for the UEFA Cup first round
3	Brann	26	16	1	9	45	40	+5	49	Qualification for the UEFA Cup qualifying round (Note: SK Brann qualified as the runner-up of the 1999 Norwegian Football Cup.)
4	Lillestrøm	26	15	3	8	60	41	+19	48	Qualification for the UEFA Cup qualifying round
5	Stabæk	26	14	4	8	58	49	+9	46	Qualification for the Intertoto Cup first round
6	Tromsø	26	13	5	8	70	46	+24	44	
7	Odd Grenland	26	12	3	11	42	48	−6	39	
8	Viking	26	11	3	12	51	48	+3	36	
9	Bodø/Glimt	26	10	4	12	52	54	−2	34	
10	Moss	26	9	2	15	39	46	−7	29	
11	Vålerenga	26	8	4	14	40	53	−13	28	
12	Strømsgodset (R)	26	7	3	16	46	68	−22	24	Qualification for the relegation play-offs
13	Skeid (R)	26	7	2	17	36	75	−39	23	Relegation to First Division
14	Kongsvinger (R)	26	6	2	18	34	59	−25	20	Relegation to First Division

Source: fotball.no
Rules for classification: 1) points; 2) goal difference; 3) number of goals scored.
(C) Champions; (R) Relegated

===== Play-off =====
October 27, 1999	IK Start	2–2	Strømsgodset IF	Kristiansand, Norway
	Kloster 7' (pen.); Nordseth 62'; Fredriksen (yellow card)		Wæhler 45'; Lemsalu 84'; Flo (yellow card); Lemsalu (yellow card)	Stadium: Kristiansand Stadion; Attendance: 5004

October 31, 1999	Strømsgodset IF	0–1	IK Start	Drammen, Norway
	Hagen (yellow card); Ødegaard (yellow card); Nyan (yellow card); Anders Michelsen (yellow card)		Leonardsen 90+'; Stefansen (yellow card)	Stadium: Marienlyst Stadion; Attendance: 5979

IK Start promoted to Tippeligaen (agg. 3–2).

==== 1. divisjon ====
Pos	Team	Pld	W	D	L	GF	GA	GD	Pts	Promotion or relegation
1	Haugesund (C, P)	26	16	4	6	61	32	+29	52	Promotion to Tippeligaen
2	Bryne (P)	26	14	7	5	43	33	+10	49	Promotion to Tippeligaen
3	Start (O, P)	26	13	8	5	42	31	+11	47	Qualification for the promotion play-offs
4	Lyn	26	11	9	6	54	30	+24	42	
5	Sogndal	26	12	6	8	38	32	+6	42	
6	Kjelsås	26	11	8	7	33	28	+5	41	
7	Eik-Tønsberg	26	10	7	9	39	39	0	37	
8	L/F Hønefoss	26	10	5	11	43	42	+1	35	
9	Raufoss	26	8	8	10	35	36	−1	32	
10	Byåsen (Note: Byåsen was deducted 3 points.)	26	9	6	11	37	32	+5	30	
11	Lofoten (R)	26	8	6	12	38	47	−9	30	Relegation to Second Division
12	Skjetten (R)	26	8	5	13	29	43	−14	29	Relegation to Second Division
13	Hødd (R)	26	5	6	15	34	51	−17	21	Relegation to Second Division
14	Clausenengen (R)	26	4	1	21	24	74	−50	13	Relegation to Second Division

Source: nifs.no
Rules for classification: 1) points; 2) goal difference; 3) number of goals scored.
(C) Champions; (O) Play-off winners; (P) Promoted; (R) Relegated

==== 2. divisjon ====
===== Group 1 =====
Pos	Team	Pld	W	D	L	GF	GA	GD	Pts	Promotion or relegation
1	Hamarkameratene (P)	22	17	2	3	61	17	+44	53	Promotion to First Division
2	Faaberg	22	14	4	4	48	22	+26	46	
3	Elverum	22	11	6	5	47	33	+14	39	
4	Grei	22	11	3	8	41	28	+13	36	
5	Lillestrøm 2	22	11	3	8	51	48	+3	36	
6	Årvoll	22	8	8	6	48	43	+5	32	
7	Lyn 2	22	9	5	8	48	46	+2	32	
8	Eidsvold Turn	22	8	3	11	42	47	−5	27	
9	Ski	22	6	5	11	29	44	−15	23	
10	Nybergsund (R)	22	5	7	10	31	37	−6	22	Relegation to Third Division
11	Trøgstad/Båstad (R)	22	4	3	15	25	69	−44	15	Relegation to Third Division
12	Tynset (R)	22	2	3	17	21	58	−37	9	Relegation to Third Division

(P) Promoted; (R) Relegated

===== Group 2 =====
Pos	Team	Pld	W	D	L	GF	GA	GD	Pts	Relegation
1	Asker	22	14	4	4	47	21	+26	46	
2	Ørn-Horten	22	14	3	5	56	26	+30	45	
3	Kvik Halden	22	13	4	5	53	35	+18	43	
4	Vålerenga 2	22	12	2	8	45	34	+11	38	
5	Sarpsborg	22	10	4	8	43	32	+11	34	
6	Lørenskog	22	10	4	8	42	35	+7	34	
7	Gjøvik-Lyn	22	9	7	6	26	24	+2	34	
8	Fredrikstad	22	8	4	10	27	28	−1	28	
9	Drøbak/Frogn	22	6	5	11	28	47	−19	23	
10	Runar (R)	22	6	2	14	33	50	−17	20	Relegation to Third Division
11	Østsiden (R)	22	5	1	16	26	62	−36	16	Relegation to Third Division
12	Abildsø (R)	22	4	2	16	25	57	−32	14	Relegation to Third Division

(R) Relegated

===== Group 3 =====
Pos	Team	Pld	W	D	L	GF	GA	GD	Pts	Promotion or relegation
1	Sandefjord (P)	22	13	9	0	59	21	+38	48	Promotion to First Division
2	Tollnes	22	13	4	5	55	28	+27	43	
3	Bærum	22	10	8	4	43	27	+16	38	
4	Pors Grenland	22	10	2	10	43	34	+9	32	
5	Ullern	22	8	7	7	39	39	0	31	
6	Skarphedin	22	9	3	10	41	37	+4	30	
7	Stabæk 2	22	8	5	9	42	42	0	29	
8	Sprint-Jeløy	22	7	5	10	36	46	−10	26	
9	Manglerud Star	22	8	2	12	41	56	−15	26	
10	Drafn (R)	22	7	4	11	31	48	−17	25	Relegation to Third Division
11	Jevnaker (R)	22	6	4	12	28	50	−22	22	Relegation to Third Division
12	Råde (R)	22	6	1	15	35	65	−30	19	Relegation to Third Division

(P) Promoted; (R) Relegated

===== Group 4 =====
Pos	Team	Pld	W	D	L	GF	GA	GD	Pts	Relegation
1	Vidar	22	13	6	3	51	26	+25	45	
2	Mandalskameratene	22	13	4	5	53	35	+18	43	
3	Start 2	22	10	3	9	45	41	+4	33	
4	Flekkefjord	22	9	6	7	39	42	−3	33	
5	Viking 2	22	8	7	7	35	29	+6	31	
6	Sandnes	22	9	3	10	42	38	+4	30	
7	Ullensaker/Kisa	22	8	5	9	36	38	−2	29	
8	Randaberg	22	7	8	7	35	41	−6	29	
9	Vard Haugesund	22	7	7	8	42	31	+11	28	
10	Haugesund 2 (R)	22	8	3	11	46	48	−2	27	Relegation to Third Division
11	Sola (R)	22	6	5	11	35	56	−21	23	Relegation to Third Division
12	Ålgård (R)	22	2	7	13	27	61	−34	13	Relegation to Third Division

(R) Relegated

===== Group 5 =====
Pos	Team	Pld	W	D	L	GF	GA	GD	Pts	Relegation
1	Fyllingen	22	17	4	1	76	19	+57	55	
2	Åsane	22	16	3	3	66	36	+30	51	
3	Førde	22	10	5	7	50	41	+9	35	
4	Fana	22	10	4	8	43	31	+12	34	
5	Os	22	9	7	6	34	24	+10	34	
6	Stord	22	7	6	9	43	40	+3	27	
7	Tornado	22	7	6	9	35	49	−14	27	
8	Ny-Krohnborg	22	5	8	9	39	43	−4	23	
9	Florø	22	6	5	11	24	58	−34	23	
10	Brann 2 (R)	22	6	4	12	46	56	−10	22	Relegation to Third Division
11	Radøy (R)	22	4	5	13	40	65	−25	17	Relegation to Third Division
12	Sogndal 2 (R)	22	4	5	13	33	67	−34	17	Relegation to Third Division

(R) Relegated

===== Group 6 =====
Pos	Team	Pld	W	D	L	GF	GA	GD	Pts	Relegation
1	Aalesund	22	17	5	0	83	17	+66	56	
2	Skarbøvik	22	15	2	5	52	25	+27	47	
3	Kolstad	22	11	5	6	44	39	+5	38	
4	Orkla	22	11	3	8	46	35	+11	36	
5	Træff	22	11	2	9	54	41	+13	35	
6	Sunndal	22	10	3	9	42	45	−3	33	
7	Molde 2	22	9	3	10	43	37	+6	30	
8	Ranheim	22	8	5	9	41	37	+4	29	
9	Ørsta	22	6	5	11	36	52	−16	23	
10	Averøykameratene (R)	22	5	4	13	27	76	−49	19	Relegation to Third Division
11	Volda (R)	22	4	4	14	25	51	−26	16	Relegation to Third Division
12	Nardo (R)	22	3	3	16	22	60	−38	12	Relegation to Third Division

(R) Relegated

===== Group 7 =====
Pos	Team	Pld	W	D	L	GF	GA	GD	Pts	Promotion or relegation
1	Strindheim (P)	22	18	1	3	80	34	+46	55	Promotion to First Division
2	Verdal	22	15	0	7	54	43	+11	45	
3	Stålkameratene	22	13	5	4	68	31	+37	44	
4	Narvik	22	11	2	9	51	48	+3	35	
5	Bodø/Glimt 2	22	10	2	10	61	57	+4	32	
6	Steinkjer	22	9	5	8	47	43	+4	32	
7	Rosenborg 2	22	8	6	8	50	50	0	30	
8	Mo	22	7	6	9	49	49	0	27	
9	Mosjøen	22	8	3	11	46	49	−3	27	
10	Gevir Bodø (R)	22	9	0	13	40	53	−13	27	Relegation to Third Division
11	Brønnøysund (R)	22	3	5	14	31	87	−56	14	Relegation to Third Division
12	Namsos (R)	22	1	5	16	27	70	−43	8	Relegation to Third Division

(P) Promoted; (R) Relegated

===== Group 8 =====
Pos	Team	Pld	W	D	L	GF	GA	GD	Pts	Promotion or relegation
1	Tromsdalen (P)	22	16	4	2	89	25	+64	52	Promotion to First Division
2	Alta	22	15	3	4	88	33	+55	48	
3	Harstad	22	14	4	4	63	26	+37	46	
4	Skarp	22	11	2	9	56	60	−4	35	
5	Sortland	22	10	4	8	49	57	−8	34	
6	Senja (Note: Senja was known as Silsand OIL until round six.)	22	8	6	8	54	66	−12	30	
7	Finnsnes	22	8	5	9	58	61	−3	29	
8	Skjervøy	22	8	5	9	46	49	−3	29	
9	Lyngen/Karnes	22	7	7	8	37	47	−10	28	
10	Nordreisa (R)	22	5	3	14	43	68	−25	18	Relegation to Third Division
11	Hammerfest (R)	22	4	4	14	40	60	−20	16	Relegation to Third Division
12	Kirkenes (R)	22	1	3	18	20	91	−71	6	Relegation to Third Division

(P) Promoted; (R) Relegated

=== Norwegian Cup ===
==== Final ====
30 October 1999
16:00 CEST (UTC+2)

Rosenborg	2–0	Brann
Sørensen 49', 56'	Report

Ullevaal Stadion, Oslo
Attendance: 25,296
Referee: Tom Henning Øvrebø (Nordstrand)

== Women's football ==
=== League season ===
==== Women's top division (Toppserien) ====
Pos	Team	Pld	W	D	L	GF	GA	GD	Pts	Relegation
1	Asker (C)	18	14	2	2	80	14	+66	44	
2	Trondheims-Ørn	18	12	4	2	85	19	+66	40	
3	Klepp	18	12	3	3	47	18	+29	39	
4	Kolbotn	18	10	3	5	53	24	+29	33	
5	Bjørnar	18	9	2	7	34	32	+2	29	
6	Setskog/Høland	18	8	3	7	37	48	−11	27	
7	Athene Moss	18	7	2	9	46	46	0	23	
8	Grand Bodø	18	4	3	11	24	70	−46	15	
9	Sandviken (R)	18	2	1	15	19	65	−46	7	Relegation to First Division
10	Kaupanger (R)	18	0	1	17	5	94	−89	1	Relegation to First Division

Source: nifs.no
(C) Champions; (R) Relegated

==== Play-off to Women's top division (Toppserien) ====
===== Play-off group 1 =====
- October 3: Medkila – Larvik 1–2
- October 9: Larvik – Voss 1–1
- October 16: Voss – Medkila 0–0

Team	Pld	W	D	L	GF	GA	GD	Pts	Promotion
Larvik	2	1	1	0	3	2	+1	4	Promoted
Voss	2	0	2	0	1	1	0	2	
Medkila	2	0	1	1	1	2	−1	1	

===== Play-off group 2 =====
- October 2: Haugar – Byåsen 0–2
- October 9: Byåsen – Liungen 4–0
- October 16: Liungen – Haugar (Not played)

Team	Pld	W	D	L	GF	GA	GD	Pts	Promotion
Byåsen	2	2	0	0	6	0	+6	6	Promoted
Haugar	1	0	0	1	0	2	−2	0	
Liungen	1	0	0	1	0	4	−4	0	

==== Women's first division ====
===== Group 1 =====
Team	Pld	W	D	L	GF	GA	GD	Pts	Qualification or relegation
FK Larvik	18	17	1	0	103	15	+88	52	Play-off
Røa	18	15	2	1	68	20	+48	47	
Gjelleråsen	18	11	3	4	48	39	+9	36	
Vallset	18	9	1	8	48	39	+9	28	
Lørenskog	18	7	4	7	36	39	−3	25	
Fossum	18	7	1	10	24	52	−28	22	
Linderud	18	4	5	9	30	43	−13	17	
Jardar	18	5	2	11	28	47	−19	17	Withdrew
Eik-Tønsberg	18	3	2	13	24	52	−28	11	
Kvam	18	1	1	16	26	89	−63	4	Relegated

===== Group 2 =====
Team	Pld	W	D	L	GF	GA	GD	Pts	Qualification
Liungen	18	14	2	2	74	27	+47	44	Play-off
Donn	18	12	3	3	52	30	+22	39	
KFUM Oslo	18	10	1	7	42	34	+8	31	Withdrew
Kolbotn 2	18	7	5	6	49	42	+7	26	
Snøgg	18	7	5	6	40	41	−1	26	
Skjetten	18	7	4	7	50	44	+6	25	
Skeid	18	7	0	11	40	50	−10	21	
Holeværingen/JIF	18	5	4	9	29	43	−14	19	
Jerv	18	4	5	9	37	64	−27	17	
Bækkelaget	18	2	1	15	32	70	−38	7	

===== Group 3 =====
Team	Pld	W	D	L	GF	GA	GD	Pts	Qualification
Haugar	14	11	2	1	52	10	+42	35	Play-off
Ulf-Sandnes	14	9	2	3	35	22	+13	29	
Flekkefjord	14	8	2	4	43	26	+17	26	
Vidar	14	8	1	5	31	21	+10	25	
Bryne	14	8	1	5	35	28	+7	25	
Vard Haugesund	14	4	0	10	13	28	−15	12	
Havørn	14	3	2	9	19	49	−30	11	
Eiger	14	0	0	14	21	65	−44	0	
Lyndal	0	0	0	0	0	0	0	0	Withdrew
Solid	0	0	0	0	0	0	0	0	Withdrew

===== Group 4 =====
Team	Pld	W	D	L	GF	GA	GD	Pts	Qualification or relegation
Voss	16	12	2	2	52	20	+32	38	Play-off
Follese	16	11	1	4	51	21	+30	34	
Bjørnar 2	16	10	3	3	43	17	+26	33	
Øygard	16	8	4	4	38	36	+2	28	
Sandviken 2	16	7	2	7	38	48	−10	23	Relegated
Nymark	16	5	3	8	35	40	−5	18	
Sandane	16	4	2	10	32	41	−9	14	
Hald	16	3	0	13	17	48	−31	9	Relegated
Førde	16	2	3	11	12	47	−35	9	Relegated
Eid	0	0	0	0	0	0	0	0	Withdrew

===== Group 5 =====
Team	Pld	W	D	L	GF	GA	GD	Pts	Qualification or relegation
Byåsen	18	15	3	0	74	14	+60	48	Play-off
Fortuna Ålesund	18	11	4	3	58	31	+27	37	
Trondheims/Ørn 2	18	11	1	6	48	36	+12	34	
Buvik/Gimse	18	10	2	6	43	34	+9	32	
Verdal	18	7	2	9	40	43	−3	23	
Rindals/Troll	18	7	2	9	35	56	−21	23	
Herd	18	5	4	9	31	45	−14	19	
Molde	18	5	0	13	29	46	−17	15	
Frei	18	3	5	10	25	56	−31	14	
Ranheim	18	4	1	13	45	67	−22	13	Relegated

===== Group 6 =====
Team	Pld	W	D	L	GF	GA	GD	Pts	Qualification
Medkila	16	12	3	1	51	14	+37	39	Play-off
Fløya	16	12	2	2	61	10	+51	38	
Tromsdalen	16	9	2	5	27	17	+10	29	
Innstranden	16	9	0	7	28	21	+7	27	
Bossmo/Ytteren	16	8	1	7	24	27	−3	25	
Halsøy	16	7	3	6	31	32	−1	24	
Alta/BUL	16	5	3	8	39	26	+13	18	
Furuflaten	16	1	2	13	15	35	−20	5	
Salangen	16	1	0	15	6	100	−94	3	

Promoted to first division:

- Bingen
- Kurland
- Søgne
- Vålerenga
- Hinna
- Rosendal
- Djerv
- Sogndal
- Orkla
- Stranda
- Pioner

== Men's UEFA competitions 1999/2000 ==
=== Norwegian representatives ===
- Rosenborg BK (UEFA Champions League)
- Molde FK (UEFA Champions League)
- Stabæk Fotball (UEFA Cup)
- Viking FK (UEFA Cup)
- Bodø/Glimt (UEFA Cup)
- SK Brann (Intertoto Cup)
- Vålerenga Fotball (Intertoto Cup)

=== UEFA Champions League ===
==== Second qualifying round ====
July 28, 1999	CSKA Moscow (Russia)	2–0	Molde FK	Moscow, Russia
	Sisjin 8'; Komduka 85'		Strande (yellow card); Olsen (yellow card)	Stadium: Dynamo Stadium; Attendance: 15 000; Referee: Manuele Enrigne Mekhito Gonzales, Spain

August 4, 1999	Molde FK	4–0	CSKA Moscow (agg. 4–2)	Molde, Norway
	Tessem 47'; Hestad 65'; Hoseth 67'; Hoseth 81'		Holli (yellow card); Varmalov (yellow card); Bokov (yellow card); Aksenov (yellow card)	Stadium: Molde stadion Attendance: 5203; Referee: Gary Willard, England

==== Third qualifying round ====
August 11, 1999	Molde FK	0–0	RCD Mallorca (Spain)	Molde, Norway
				Stadium: Molde stadion Attendance: 8573; Referee: Mario van der Ende, Netherlands

August 25, 1999	RCD Mallorca	1–1	Molde FK (agg. 1–1, a)	Mallorca, Spain
	Stanković 23' (pen.); Nino (red card) 84'; Siviero (yellow card); Ibagaza (yellow card)		Lund 85' (pen.)	Stadium: Estadio Son Moix; Attendance: 19 000; Referee: Stephano Braschi, Italy

==== First group stage ====
===== Group C =====
Pos	Team	Pld	W	D	L	GF	GA	GD	Pts	Qualification	ROS	FEY	DOR	BOA
1	(Norway) Rosenborg	6	3	2	1	12	5	+7	11	Advance to second group stage	—	2–2	2–2	2–0
2	(Netherlands) Feyenoord	6	1	5	0	7	6	+1	8	Advance to second group stage	1–0	—	1–1	1–1
3	(Germany) Borussia Dortmund	6	1	3	2	7	9	−2	6	Transfer to UEFA Cup	0–3	1–1	—	3–1
4	(Portugal) Boavista	6	1	2	3	4	10	−6	5		0–3	1–1	1–0	—

Source: UEFA

September 14, 1999	Boavista F.C. (Portugal)	0–3	Rosenborg BK	Porto, Portugal
	Manuel (yellow card)		Sørensen 9'; Berg 44'; Strand 73'; Bragstad (yellow card); Jakobsen (yellow card)	Stadium: Estádio do Bessa; Attendance: 10 000; Referee: Cesari Graziano, Italy

September 22, 1999	Rosenborg BK	2–2	Feyenoord (Netherlands)	Trondheim, Norway
	Carew 21'; Carew 24'; Berg (yellow card)		Tomasson 12'; Kalou 22' van Wonderen (yellow card); Bosvelt (yellow card); Paauwe (yellow card)	Stadium: Lerkendal stadion Attendance: 14 149; Referee: Miroslav Radoman, Yugoslavia

September 29, 2009	Rosenborg BK	2–2	Borussia Dortmund (Germany)	Trondheim, Norway
	Sørensen 34'; Carew 67'; Winsnes (yellow card)		Barbarez 11'; Kohler 22'; Reina (yellow card); Evanilson (yellow card); Ricken (yellow card); Reuter (yellow card)	Stadium: Lerkendal stadion Attendance: 14 068; Referee: Paul Durkin, England

October 19, 1999	Borussia Dortmund	0–3	Rosenborg BK	Dortmund, Norway
	Ricken (red card)		Sørensen 17'; Sørensen 58'; Winsnes 70'; Winsnes (yellow card); Jamtfall (yellow card); Jakobsen (yellow card)	Stadium: Westfalen stadion Attendance: 40 000; Referee: Antonio Lopez Nieto, Spain

October 27, 1999	Rosenborg BK	2–0	Boavista F.C.	Trondheim, Norway
	Berg 62'; Dahlum 66'; Bergdølmo (yellow card)			Stadium: Lerkendal stadion Attendance: 14 167; Referee: Michel Piraux, Belgium

November 2, 1999	Feyenoord	1–0	Rosenborg BK	Rotterdam, Netherlands
	Somalia 87'; Kornejev (yellow card)		Bragstad (yellow card); Bergdølmo (yellow card); Sørensen (yellow card)	Stadium: De Kuip; Attendance: 35 000

===== Group E =====
Pos	Team	Pld	W	D	L	GF	GA	GD	Pts	Qualification	RMA	POR	OLY	MOL
1	(Spain) Real Madrid	6	4	1	1	15	7	+8	13	Advance to second group stage	—	3–1	3–0	4–1
2	(Portugal) Porto	6	4	0	2	9	6	+3	12	Advance to second group stage	2–1	—	2–0	3–1
3	(Greece) Olympiacos	6	2	1	3	9	12	−3	7	Transfer to UEFA Cup	3–3	1–0	—	3–1
4	(Norway) Molde	6	1	0	5	6	14	−8	3		0–1	0–1	3–2	—

Source: UEFA

September 15, 1999	Molde FK	0–1	F.C. Porto (Portugal)	Molde, Norway
	Deco 89'; Costa (yellow card); Deco (yellow card); Peixe (yellow card)			Stadium: Molde stadion Attendance: 8739; Referee: Alain Hamer, Luxembourg

September 21, 1999	Real Madrid (Spain)	4–1	Molde FK	Madrid, Spain
	Morientes 26'; Sávio 60'; Sávio 70' (pen.); Guti 81'		Lindbæk 80'; Strande (yellow card); Lydersen (yellow card)	Stadium: Estadio Santiago Bernabéu; Attendance: 15 000; Referee: Hartmut Strampe, Germany

September 28, 1999	Olympiacos (Greece)	3–1	Molde FK	Athens, Greece
	Giovanni 16'; Giovanni 70'; Luciano de Souza 77'; Amanatidis (yellow card)		Lund 58'	Stadium: Olympic stadium Attendance: 45 000; Referee: Michel Lubos, Slovakia

October 20, 1999	Molde FK	3–2	Olympiacos	Molde, Norway
	Lund 55'; Lund 59'; Berg Hestad 74'		Mavrogenidis 35'; Zahovic 40'; Passalis (yellow card); Giovanni (yellow card)	Stadium: Molde stadion Attendance: 10 230; Referee: Ryszard Wojcik, Poland

October 26, 1999	F.C. Porto	3–1	Molde FK	Porto, Portugal
	Deco 1'; Deco 28'; Jardel 57'		Berg Hestad 82'	Stadium: Estádio das Antas; Attendance: 35 000; Referee: Graham Barber, England

November 3, 1999	Molde FK	0–1	Real Madrid	Molde, Norway
			Karembeu 43'; Helguera (yellow card)	Stadium: Molde stadion Attendance: 10 785; Referee: Gilles Veissiere, France

==== Second group stage ====
===== Group C =====
Pos	Team	Pld	W	D	L	GF	GA	GD	Pts	Qualification	BAY	RMA	DKV	ROS
1	(Germany) Bayern Munich	6	4	1	1	13	8	+5	13	Advance to knockout stage	—	4–1	2–1	2–1
2	(Spain) Real Madrid	6	3	1	2	11	12	−1	10	Advance to knockout stage	2–4	—	2–2	3–1
3	(Ukraine) Dynamo Kyiv	6	3	1	2	10	8	+2	10		2–0	1–2	—	2–1
4	(Norway) Rosenborg	6	0	1	5	5	11	−6	1		1–1	0–1	1–2	—

Source: UEFA

November 24, 1999	Rosenborg BK	1–1	Bayern Munich (Germany)	Trondheim, Norway
	Skammelsrud 47'; Carew (yellow card)		Jancker 10'	Stadium: Lerkendal stadion Attendance: 15 000; Referee: Stefano Braschi, Italy

December 7, 1999	Real Madrid (Spain)	3–1	Rosenborg BK	Madrid, Spain
	Raul 18'; Sávio 85'; Carlos 90'		Carew 47'	Stadium: Estadio Santiago Bernabéu; Attendance: 30 000; Referee: Michel Piraux, Belgium

February 29, 2000	Dynamo Kyiv (Ukraine)	2–1	Rosenborg BK	Kyiv, Ukraine
	Khatskevich 9'; Rebrov 29'		Jakobsen 48'; Bergdølmo (yellow card); Winsnes (yellow card)	Stadium: Olimpiysky; Attendance: 20 000; Referee: Lubos Michel, Slovakia

March 8, 2000	Rosenborg BK	1–2	Dynamo Kyiv	Trondheim, Norway
	Berg 38'		Rebrov 38'; Rebrov 67'; Kaladze (yellow card)	Stadium: Lerkendal stadion Attendance: 13 067; Referee: Alain Hamer, Luxembourg

March 14, 2000	Bayern Munich	2–1	Rosenborg BK	Munich, Germany
	Scholl 10'; Paulo Sérgio 39' (pen.); Tarnat (yellow card); Scholl (yellow card)		Carew 64'; Bragstad (red card) 90'; Skammelsrud (yellow card)	Stadium: Olympic Stadium; Attendance: 20 000; Referee: Alfredo Trentelange, Italy

March 22, 1999	Rosenborg BK	0–1	Real Madrid	Trondheim, Norway
			Raul 3'; Guti (red card); Salgado (yellow card)	Stadium: Lerkendal stadion Attendance: 12 653; Referee: Nikolaj Levnikov, Russia

=== UEFA Cup ===
==== Qualifying round ====
August 12, 1999	Bodø/Glimt	1–0	FC Vaduz (Liechtenstein)	Bodø, Norway
	Staurvik 27'			Stadium: Aspmyra stadion Attendance: 1612; Referee: Darius Miezelis, Lithuania

August 12, 1999	Viking FK	7–0	Principat (Andorra)	Stavanger, Norway
	Aarsheim 5'; Svensson 17'; Dadason 40'; Svensson 48'; Nygård 64'; Dadason 72'; Dadason 82'		Paski (yellow card); Inaki (yellow card); Pablo (yellow card); Felix (yellow card); Andres (red card)	Stadium: Stavanger stadion Attendance: 2090; Referee: Egil Mar Markusson, Iceland

August 26, 1999	Principat	0–11	Viking FK (agg. 0 – 18)	Andorra la Vella, Andorra
			Dadason 37'; Dadason 42'; Berre 43'; Berland 44'; Berland 45'; Berre 61'; Sanne 64'; Sanne 65'; Sanne 67'; Berre 75'; Mathiassen 83'	Stadium: Estadi Comunal; Attendance: 300; Referee: Antonio Costa, Portugal

August 26, 1999	FC Vaduz	1–2	Bodø/Glimt (agg. 1 – 3)	Vaduz, Liechtenstein
	Wegmann 39'; Bossi (yellow card)		Sæternes 29'; Sæternes 83'; Berg (yellow card); Bergersen (yellow card); Evjen (yellow card)	Stadium: Rhinplatz stadium Attendance: 815; Referee: Kevin Perry, Wales

==== First round ====
September 14, 1999	Stabæk Fotball	1–0	Deportivo La Coruna (Spain)	Oslo, Norway
	Flem (yellow card) 39'; Finstad 57'; Stenersen 59'; Holter 64'		Djalminha (yellow card) 31'; Jokanovic (yellow card) 54'	Stadium: Ullevaal stadion Attendance: 3807; Referee: Romans Lajuks, Latvia

September 16, 1999	Bodø/Glimt	0–5	Werder Bremen (Germany)	Trondheim, Norway
			Pizarro 12'; Bogdanovic 44'; Bogdanovic 55'; Maksimov 60'; Pizarro 76'	Stadium: Lerkendal stadion Attendance: 1425; Referee: Igor Jarmentsjuk, Ukraine

September 16, 1999	Viking FK	3–0	Sporting CP (Portugal)	Stavanger, Norway
	Svensson 57'; Berre 70'; Espevoll 78' (pen.); Aarsheim (yellow card)		Rui Jorge (yellow card)	Stadium: Stavanger stadion Attendance: 4080; Referee: Fiorenzo Treoss, Italy

September 30, 1999	Werder Bremen	1–1	Bodø/Glimt (agg. 5 – 1)	Bremen, Germany
	Ailton 76'		Staurvik 36'; Bjørkan (yellow card); Robertson (yellow card); Ludvigsen (yellow card)	Stadium: Weserstadion; Attendance: 15 291; Referee: Erdemeri, Turkey

September 30, 1999	Deportivo La Coruna	2–0	Stabæk Fotball (agg. 2 – 1)	A Coruña, Spain
	Jokanovic 37'; Flavio 62'; Djalminha (yellow card)		Stenersen (yellow card); Flem (red card); Linderoth (yellow card); Stenvoll (yellow card)	Stadium: Estadio Riazor; Attendance: 17 000; Referee: Kenny Clark, Scotland

September 30, 1999	Sporting CP	1–0	Viking FK (agg. 1 – 3)	Lisbon, Portugal
	Ayew 76' (pen.); Duzer (yellow card)		Berre (yellow card); Hansen (yellow card)	Attendance: 25 000; Referee: Marcel Lica, Romania

==== Second round ====
October 21, 1999	Werder Bremen (Germany)	0–0	Viking FK	Bremen, Germany
	Wiedener (yellow card)		Lunde Aarsheim (yellow card)	Stadium: Weserstadion; Attendance: 5984; Referee: Erik Romain, Belgium

November 4, 1999	Viking FK	2 – 2 (a)	Werder Bremen	Stavanger, Norway
	Berland 3'; Dadason 84'; Dadason (yellow card); Svensson (yellow card)		Wiedener 43'; Herzog 63'; Júlio César (yellow card)	Stadium: Stavanger stadion Attendance: 6120; Referee: Arturo Dauden Ibanez, Spain

=== Intertoto Cup ===
==== First round ====
June 19, 1999	Vålerenga Fotball	1–0	FK Ventspils (Latvia)	Oslo, Norway
				Stadium: Ullevaal stadion

June 26, 1999	FK Ventspils	2–0	Vålerenga Fotball (agg. 2 – 1)	Ventspils, Latvia

==== Second round ====
July 3, 1999	SK Brann	3–0	NK Varteks (Croatia)	Bergen, Norway
				Stadium: Brann stadion

July 10, 1999	NK Varteks	3–0 (5–4 p)	SK Brann (agg. 3 – 3)	Varaždin, Croatia

== National teams ==
=== Norway men's national football team ===
Date	Venue	Opponent	Res.*	Competition	Norwegian goalscorers
January 20	Tel Aviv	Israel	1–0	Friendly	Bent Skammelsrud
January 22	Umm el-Fahm	Estonia	3–3	Friendly	Ståle Solbakken, Roar Strand, John Carew
February 10	Pisa	Italy	0–0	Friendly
March 27	Athens	Greece	2–0	ECQ	Ole Gunnar Solskjær (2)
April 28	Tbilisi	Georgia	4–1	ECQ	Gela Shekiladze (Own goal), Tore André Flo (2), Ole Gunnar Solskjær
May 20	Oslo	Jamaica	6–0	Friendly	Tore André Flo (2), Steffen Iversen, Øyvind Leonhardsen, Tore André Dahlum, Andreas Lund
May 30	Oslo	Georgia	1–0	ECQ	Steffen Iversen
June 5	Tirana	Albania	2–1	ECQ	Steffen Iversen, Tore André Dahlum
August 18	Oslo	Lithuania	1–0	Friendly	Andreas Lund
September 4	Oslo	Greece	1–0	ECQ	Øyvind Leonhardsen
September 8	Oslo	Slovenia	4–0	ECQ	Rudi Istenic (Own goal), Steffen Iversen, Ole Gunnar Solskjær, Øyvind Leonhardsen
October 9	Riga	Latvia	2–1	ECQ	Ole Gunnar Solskjær, Tore André Flo
November 14	Oslo	Germany	0–1	Friendly

Note: Norway's goals first
Explanation:

- ECQ = UEFA Euro 2000 qualifier

=== Norway women's national football team ===
Date	Venue	Opponent	Res.*	Competition	Norwegian goalscorers
March 14	Silves	Finland	1–0	Friendly	Gro Espeseth
March 16	Quarteira	Sweden	2–1	Friendly	Anita Rapp, Linda Medalen
March 18	Albufeira	United States	1–2	Friendly	?
March 20	Quarteira	Denmark	2–2 (4–1 (p))	Friendly	Cecilie Bendiksen (2)
May 12	San Benedetto del Tronto	Italy	2–2	Friendly	Linda Medalen, Dagny Mellgren
May 26	Raufoss	Netherlands	0–0	Friendly
June 20	Boston	Russia	2–1	World Cup group stage	Marianne Pettersen, Brit Sandaune
June 23	Washington, D.C.	Canada	7–1	World Cup group stage	Solveig Gulbrandsen, Marianne Pettersen, Linda Medalen, Hege Riise, Unni Lehn
June 26	Chicago	Japan	4–0	World Cup group stage	Dagny Mellgren, Unni Lehn, Hege Riise
June 30	San Jose	Sweden	3–1	World Cup quarter-final	Hege Riise, Marianne Pettersen
July 4	Boston	China	0–5	World Cup semi-final
July 10	Los Angeles	Brazil	0–0 (4–5 (p))	World Cup third place play-off
September 11	Follese	Switzerland	4–0	ECQ	Unni Lehn, Monica Knudsen, Ragnhild Gulbrandsen
October 23	Sesimbra	Portugal	4–0	ECQ	Ann Kristin Aarønes (3), Silje Jørgensen

Note: Norway's goals first
Explanation:

- ECQ = UEFA Women's Euro 2001 qualifier
