= 1999 Norwegian Football Cup =

Norgesmesterskapet i fotball for herrer

Tournament details
- Country: Norway
- Teams: 128 (main competition)

Final positions
- Champions: Rosenborg (8th title)
- Runners-up: Brann

Tournament statistics
- Matches played: 127
- Goals scored: 512 (4.03 per match)

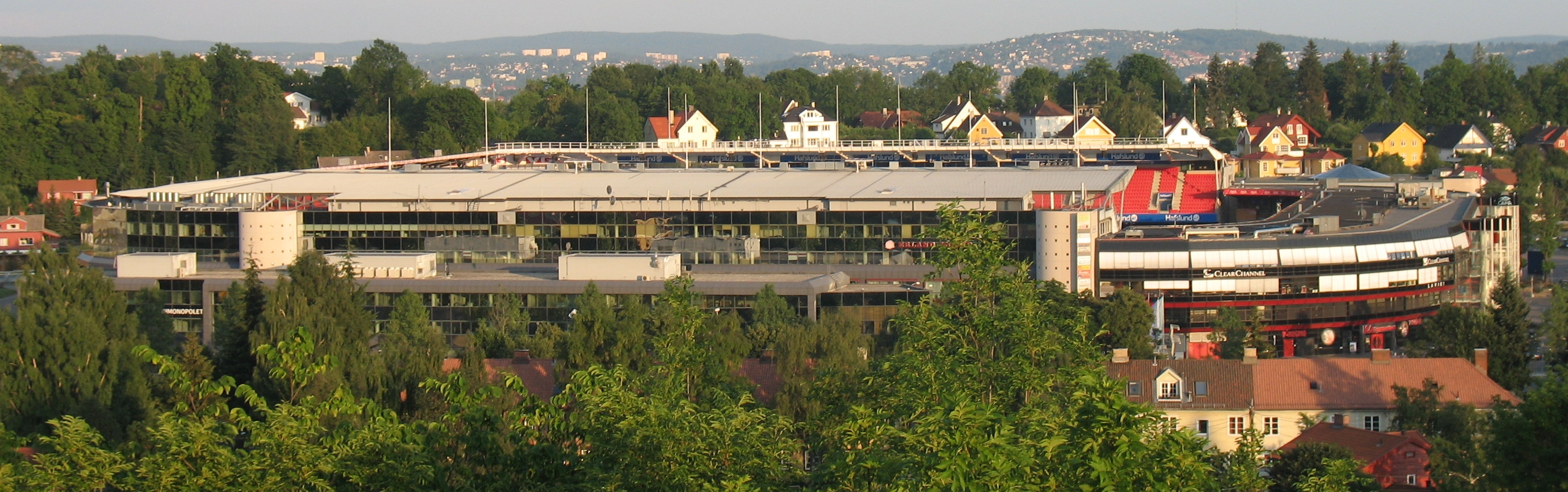
Ullevaal Stadion, Oslo - venue for the Norwegian Cup final

The 1999 Norwegian Football Cup the 94th edition of the Norwegian Football Cup. The Cup was won by Rosenborg after beating Brann in the final with the score 2–0. This was Rosenborg's eighth Norwegian Cup title.

== Calendar ==
Below are the dates for each round as given by the official schedule:

Round	Date(s)	Number of fixtures	Clubs
First round	4–5 May 1999	64	128 → 64
Second round	19–21 May 1999	32	64 → 32
Third round	23 June 1999	16	32 → 16
Fourth round	30 June 1999	8	16 → 8
Quarter-finals	4–5 August 1999	4	8 → 4
Semi-finals	26 September 1999	2	4 → 2
Final	30 October 1999	1	2 → 1

== First round ==
The First round was played on 4 May and 5 May. Two 1. divisjon sides, Eik-Tønsberg and Skjetten was eliminated in this round.

Team 1	Score	Team 2
4 May 1999
Sandnes FK	2–2 (2–3 p)	Vidar
Ranheim	4–2	NTNUI
Steinkjer	0–1	Verdal
Runar	4–0	Skarphedin
5 May 1999
Sparta Sarpsborg	1–6	Moss
Lisleby	0–4	Lillestrøm
Rakkestad	1–2	Lyn
Fredrikstad	4–0	Råde
Sprint-Jeløy	1–0	Sarpsborg FK
Trøgstad/Båstad	2–2 (2–4 p)	Abildsø
Eidsvold Turn	0–3	Manglerud Star
Ski	0–2 (a.e.t.)	Kjelsås
Årvoll	3–1	Ull/Kisa
Mercantile	3–3 (4–3 p)	Skjetten
Ullern	1–0	Asker
Fagerborg	0–6	Vålerenga
Korsvoll	0–3	Skeid
Frigg	1–5	Stabæk
Bærum	0–2	Grei
HamKam	2–1 (a.e.t.)	Lørenskog
Elverum	2–4 (a.e.t.)	Kongsvinger
Tynset	0–3	Nybergsund
Lom	1–3	Faaberg
Nordre Land	1–4	Raufoss
Gjøvik-Lyn	3–0	Jevnaker
Drafn	1–2	L/F Hønefoss
Sandefjord	2–1	Drøbak/Frogn
Tollnes	2–1	Eik-Tønsberg
Borre	1–4	Strømsgodset
Pors Grenland	0–3	Ørn-Horten
Seljord	0–5	Odd Grenland
Våg	0–4	Start
Mandalskameratene	0–2	Vigør
Bryne	5–0	Flekkefjord
Vedavåg	1–3	Ålgård
Randaberg	1–2 (a.e.t.)	Sola
Kåsen	0–3	Viking
Kopervik	0–2	Haugesund
Nord	1–2	Vard Haugesund
Stord	0–1	Os
Fyllingen	6–2	Radøy
Kleppestø	3–4	Åsane
Løv-Ham	1–3 (a.e.t.)	Fana
Nordhordland	0–3	Brann
Førde	0–2	Sogndal
Tornado	0–2	Florø
Ørsta	3–1	Skarbøvik
Hødd	2–0 (a.e.t.)	Aalesund
Spjelkavik	1–8	Molde
Sunndal	2–1	Averøykameratene
Kristiansund	0–2	Clausenengen
Strindheim	7–1	Kolstad
Tiller	0–4	Byåsen
Melhus	0–3	Rosenborg
Nardo	1–6	Mosjøen
Vinne	0–4	Bodø/Glimt
Stålkameratene	4–5 (a.e.t.)	Mo
Gevir Bodø	0–5	Narvik
Lofoten	4–2	Harstad
Finnsnes	5–3 (a.e.t.)	Silsand/Omegn
Skarp	5–1	Kirkenes
Skjervøy	3–2	Tromsdalen
Salangen	0–8	Tromsø
Hammerfest	0–4	Alta

== Second round ==
Team 1	Score	Team 2
19 May 1999
Moss	3–0	Runar
Mercantile	0–1 (a.e.t.)	Skeid
Grei	0–1	Ullern
Manglerud Star	2–3 (a.e.t.)	Kongsvinger
Abildsø	0–3	Stabæk
Kjelsås	3–0	Sprint-Jeløy
Faaberg	0–1	Lillestrøm
Raufoss	7–0	Årvoll
Nybergsund	0–2	Vålerenga
L/F Hønefoss	0–5	Fredrikstad
Strømsgodset	4–0	Tollnes
Ørn-Horten	0–1	Lyn
Odd Grenland	1–0	Sandefjord
Vigør	1–6	Start
Sola	2–4	Bryne
Ålgård	0–0 (4–3 p)	Vidar
Vard Haugesund	0–2	Viking
Os	4–3	Fyllingen
Åsane	1–4	Haugesund
Fana	0–2	Brann
Ørsta	3–1	Hødd
Clausenengen	0–1	Strindheim
Verdal	0–1	Byåsen
Mosjøen	0–2	Bodø/Glimt
Mo	2–1	Lofoten
Narvik	6–1	Finnsnes
Tromsø	3–1	Skjervøy
Alta	3–2	Skarp
20 May 1999
Gjøvik-Lyn	2–1	HamKam
21 May 1999
Florø	0–3	Sogndal
8 June 1999
Molde	6–0	Sunndal
9 June 1999
Rosenborg	5–0	Ranheim

== Third round ==
22 June 1999
19:00 CEST (UTC+2)

Narvik	1–9	Rosenborg
Johansen 38'	Report	Hoftun 11', 80'; Skammelsrud 17', 22'; Berg 39'; Hernes 47'; Winsnes 53', 89'; Jakobsen 71'

Narvik Stadion, Narvik
Attendance: 2,059
Referee: Tor Arne Fiskum

23 June 1999
15:00 CEST (UTC+2)

Alta	1–6	Tromsø
Pettersen 81'	Report	Gudmundsson 6', 40', 60', 72'; Lange 20'; Johansen 54'

Finnmarkshallen, Alta
Attendance: 503
Referee: Rune Pedersen

23 June 1999
17:30 CEST (UTC+2)

Bodø/Glimt	9–0	Mo
Bergersen 2', 86'; Bjørkan 17'; Berg 28', 59'; Hanssen 37', 58', 87'; Mikalsen 85'	Report

Aspmyra Stadion, Bodø
Attendance: 539
Referee: Frode Kvam

23 June 1999
17:30 CEST (UTC+2)

Lyn	2–1 (a.e.t.)	Start
Kaasa 33'; Gundersen 103' (o.g.)	Report	Wæhler 90' (o.g.)

Ullevaal Stadion, Oslo
Attendance: 278
Referee: Espen Berntsen

23 June 1999
18:00 CEST (UTC+2)

Byåsen	1–2	Moss
Halvorsen 90'	Report	Petersen 50'; Johnsen 62'

Heimdal Gressbane, Trondheim
Attendance: 140
Referee: Stig Are Sørensen

23 June 1999
18:00 CEST (UTC+2)

Kongsvinger	1–0	Bryne
Bergman 54'	Report

Gjemselund Stadion, Kongsvinger
Attendance: 727
Referee: Svein Haugom

23 June 1999
18:00 CEST (UTC+2)

Strindheim	1–3	Molde
Johnsen 41'	Report	Lund 39' (pen.), 59', 87'

Lerkendal Stadion, Trondheim
Attendance: 230
Referee: Bjarne Hansen

23 June 1999
18:00 CEST (UTC+2)

Viking	5–0	Ålgård
Kristensen 30'; Dadason 32', 72'; Mathiassen 76'; Aarsheim 84'	Report

Stavanger Stadion, Stavanger
Attendance: 460
Referee: Ivar Ansgar Eriksen

23 June 1999
18:30 CEST (UTC+2)

Brann	3–1	Ørsta
Kottila 14', 19'; Valencia 90'	Report	Kolås 25'

Brann Stadion, Bergen
Attendance: 730
Referee: Jarle Nilsen

23 June 1999
18:30 CEST (UTC+2)

Haugesund	5–1	Strømsgodset
Samuelsson 26'; Garba 28'; Lein 45', 55', 58'	Report	L. Olsen 90'

Haugesund Stadion, Haugesund
Attendance: 1,598
Referee: Ole Kamben

23 June 1999
18:30 CEST (UTC+2)

Stabæk	6–1	Gjøvik-Lyn
Marteinsson 15'; Sigurdsson 58'; Andresen 60', 64'; Belsvik 62', 75'	Report	Larsstuen 63'

Nadderud Stadion, Bærum
Attendance: 487
Referee: Jon Skjervold

23 June 1999
18:30 CEST (UTC+2)

Ullern	0–2	Odd Grenland
	Report	Johnsen 89'; Mahlio 90'

Ullernbanen, Oslo
Attendance: 170
Referee: Steinar Roland

23 June 1999
19:00 CEST (UTC+2)

Fredrikstad	0–3	Vålerenga
	Report	Carew 36'; Døhli 52'; Musæus 71'

Fredrikstad Stadion, Fredrikstad
Attendance: 2,900
Referee: Per Ivar Staberg

23 June 1999
19:00 CEST (UTC+2)

Lillestrøm	3–0	Os
Sundgot 30', 90'; Berntsen 55'	Report

Åråsen Stadion, Lillestrøm
Attendance: 617
Referee: Bjørn Hansen

23 June 1999
19:00 CEST (UTC+2)

Skeid	3–4	Raufoss
Lindbæk 53', 55', 86'	Report	Nygård 9'; Fjeldstad 29'; Hagen 36'; T. Olsen 75'

Voldsløkka Stadion, Oslo
Attendance: 481
Referee: Erik Rossbach Sannerholt

23 June 1999
19:00 CEST (UTC+2)

Sogndal	0–2	Kjelsås
	Report	Skonnord 77'; Halvorsen 89'

Fosshaugane Stadion, Sogndalsfjøra
Attendance: 258
Referee: Terje Hauge

== Fourth round ==
29 June 1999
18:00 CEST (UTC+2)

Kjelsås	2–3	Molde
Brændvang 2'; Berre 38' (pen.)	Report	Lund 4', 19', 81' (pen.)

Grefsen Stadion, Oslo
Attendance: 1,405
Referee: Frode Kvam

30 June 1999
18:00 CEST (UTC+2)

Vålerenga	1–3	Brann
Musæus 88'	Report	Helstad 3'; Løvvik 55'; Hanstveit 80'

Ullevaal Stadion, Oslo
Attendance: 6,123
Referee: Rune Pedersen

30 June 1999
18:00 CEST (UTC+2)

Tromsø	2–1	Stabæk
Ro. Lange 69'; Hafstad 74'	Report	Larsen 60'

Alfheim Stadion, Tromsø
Attendance: 3,994
Referee: Jon Skjervold

30 June 1999
18:30 CEST (UTC+2)

Bodø/Glimt	2–4 (a.e.t.)	Lyn
Berg 58'; Bergersen 90'	Report	Nilsen 44'; Kaasa 77'; Haug 112'; Swift 119'

Aspmyra Stadion, Bodø
Attendance: 1,654
Referee: Tommy Skjerven

30 June 1999
18:30 CEST (UTC+2)

Lillestrøm	3–1	Haugesund
Helguson 44', 81'; Sundgot 72'	Report	Ystaas 55'

Åråsen Stadion, Lillestrøm
Attendance: 1,553
Referee: Jonny Ditlefsen

30 June 1999
18:30 CEST (UTC+2)

Odd Grenland	2–1	Viking
Flindt-Bjerg 34' (pen.); Deila 90'	Report	Svensson 51'

Odd Stadion, Skien
Attendance: 3,021
Referee: Kjell Alseth

30 June 1999
18:30 CEST (UTC+2)

Rosenborg	4–1	Moss
Rushfeldt 26' (pen.); Sørensen 38'; Winsnes 90'; Johnsen 90'	Report	Sylte 63'

Lerkendal Stadion, Trondheim
Attendance: 3,746
Referee: Roy Helge Olsen

30 June 1999
19:00 CEST (UTC+2)

Raufoss	2–1	Kongsvinger
Fjeldstad 50'; Augustsson 57'	Report	Bergman 4'

Raufoss Stadion, Raufoss
Attendance: 1,656
Referee: Terje Hauge

== Quarter-finals ==
4 August 1999
18:00 CEST (UTC+2)

Tromsø	5–0	Raufoss
Hafstad 9'; Ru. Lange 39', 68' (pen.); Fermann 77'; Gudmundsson 88'	Report

Alfheim Stadion, Tromsø
Attendance: 3,274
Referee: Kjell Alseth

4 August 1999
19:00 CEST (UTC+2)

Brann	3–2	Odd Grenland
Kvisvik 7' (pen.); Guntveit 68', 78'	Report	Fevang 48'; Johnsen 75'

Brann Stadion, Bergen
Attendance: 6,642
Referee: Rune Pedersen

5 August 1999
19:00 CEST (UTC+2)

Lyn	1–2	Rosenborg
Kaasa 75'	Report	Jakobsen 47'; Johnsen 65'

Ullevaal Stadion, Oslo
Attendance: 5,195
Referee: Jonny Ditlefsen

25 September 1999
16:00 CEST (UTC+2)

Molde	3–0	Lillestrøm
Lund 59'; O. I. Olsen 73'; Sundgot 79'	Report

Molde Stadion, Molde
Attendance: 2,523
Referee: Frode Kvam

== Semi-finals ==
26 September 1999
19:00 CEST (UTC+2)

Rosenborg	2–1	Tromsø
Johnsen 36'; Berg 56'	Report	Ru. Lange 23'

Lerkendal Stadion, Trondheim
Attendance: 10,086
Referee: Terje Hauge

3 October 1999
16:00 CEST (UTC+2)

Molde	3–4 (a.e.t.)	Brann
Lund 65', 71'; Lindbæk 72'	Report	Kvisvik 6', 63'; Helstad 90'; Ludvigsen 109'

Molde Stadion, Molde
Attendance: 5,966
Referee: Roy Helge Olsen

== Final ==
30 October 1999
16:00 CEST (UTC+2)

Rosenborg	2–0	Brann
Sørensen 49', 56'	Report

Ullevaal Stadion, Oslo
Attendance: 25,296
Referee: Tom Henning Øvrebø (Nordstrand)
