= Leonhardsen =

Leonhardsen is a Norwegian surname, originating as a patronymic from Leonhard. Notable people with the surname include:

- Frida Leonhardsen Maanum (born 1999), Norwegian footballer
- Leif Leonhardsen Erlsboe (1943–2000), Danish-Norwegian film director
- Øyvind Leonhardsen (born 1970), Norwegian former footballer

== See also ==
- Leonardsen
