= Rune Hauge =

Norwegian football agent (born 1954)

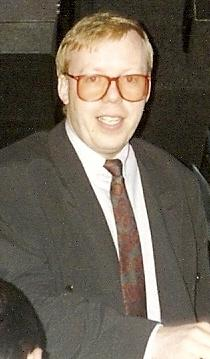
Hauge in 1993

Rune Hauge (born 23 April 1954) is a Norwegian football agent. Hauge represented John Jensen and Pål Lydersen during their transfers to Arsenal in the early 1990s. This would lead to Arsenal manager George Graham becoming embroiled in allegations that Hauge paid him a £425,000 "bung" to sign the players. Graham was later found guilty by the Football Association after admitting receiving an "unsolicited gift" and was suspended for a year. Before this, Hauge was involved in the signings of Andrei Kanchelskis and Peter Schmeichel for Manchester United.

Hauge was banned from operating as an agent for life by FIFA in 1995, but this was later reduced to two years' suspension of his licence. After he regained his licence, he went on to represent several Norwegian players including Ole Gunnar Solskjær, Steffen Iversen and Eirik Bakke. He was also involved in the transfer of Rio Ferdinand from West Ham United to Leeds United.

In 2005, he was involved in the transfer dispute between Manchester United and Chelsea over Mikel John Obi, claiming (along with others) that he had the right to represent Mikel.

Hauge's other clients included Norwegian midfielder Morten Gamst Pedersen.
