= Petter Christian Singsaas =

Norwegian footballer

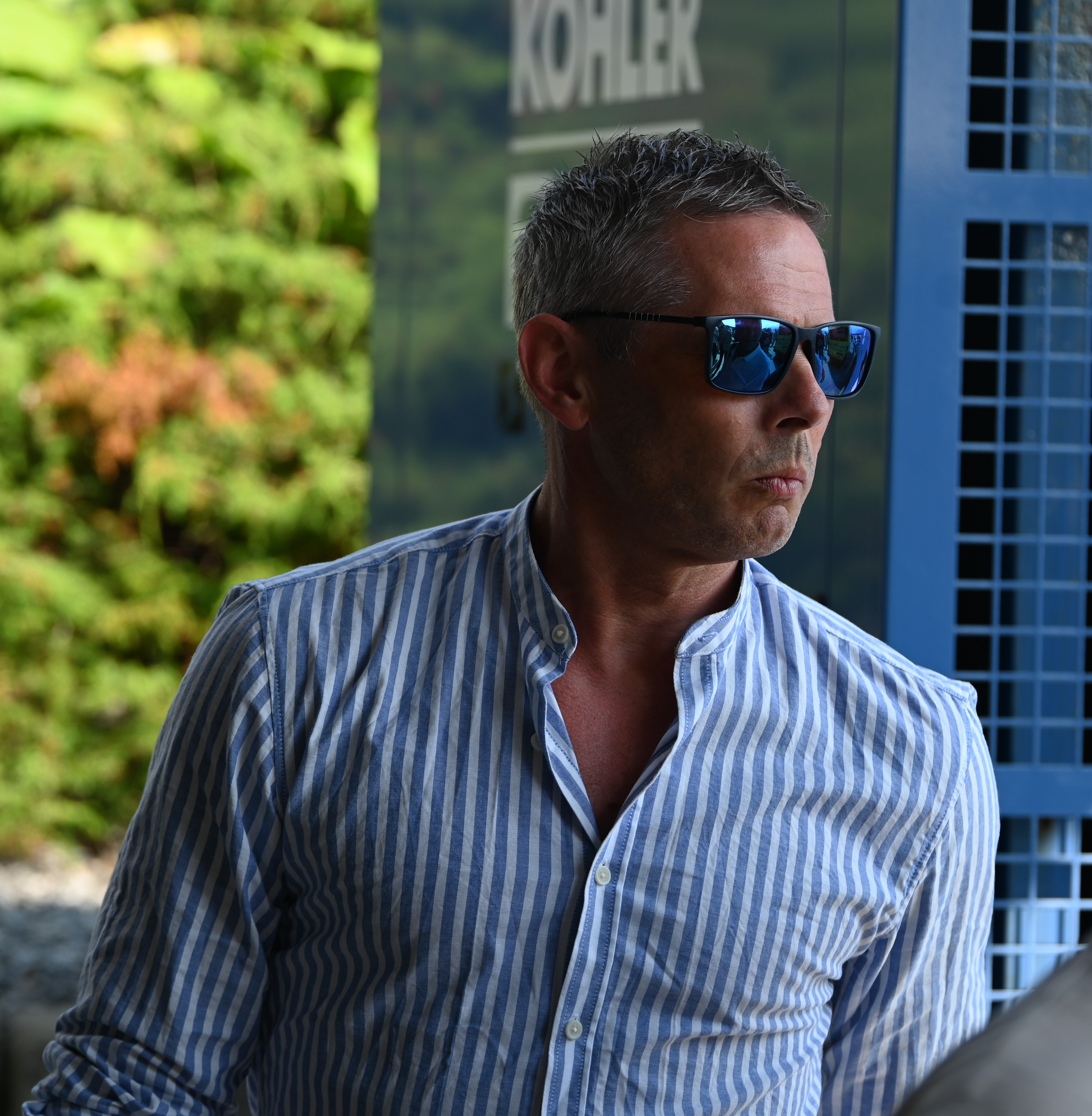
- Petter Christian Singsaas in 2026.

Personal information
- Date of birth: 30 July 1975 (age 51)
- Position: Defender

Senior career*
Years	Team	Apps	(Gls)
–1994	Steinkjer		
1995–2003	Molde	135	(3)
2005–2007	Molde	38	(1)
Medal record
Molde
Winner	Norwegian Football Cup	2005
- * Club domestic league appearances and goals

Petter Christian Singsaas (born 23 August 1972) is a Norwegian former football player, who played as a central defender, most notably for Molde. He won the Norwegian cup with Molde in 2005.

== Club career ==
Singsaas debuted for Molde in the Tippeligaen match against Brann on 22 April 1995, and went on to play for Molde for nine seasons until 2003, had a break from top level football and returned to Molde in 2005 where he played another three seasons. He was offered a contract extension after the 2007 season, but chose to retire from football.

== Career statistics ==
Season	Club	Division	League		Cup		Europe		Other		Total	
Season	Club	Division	Apps	Goals	Apps	Goals	Apps	Goals	Apps	Goals	Apps	Goals
1995	Molde	Tippeligaen	14	0			2 (Note: Appearances in UEFA Cup Winners' Cup)	0	—		16	0
1996	Molde	Tippeligaen	23	0	4	0	2 (Note: Appearances in UEFA Cup)	0	—		29	016
1997	Molde	Tippeligaen	20	1	1	0	—		—		21	1
1998	Molde	Tippeligaen	11	0	2	0	1	0	—		14	0
1999	Molde	Tippeligaen	12	1	5	0	6 (Note: 6 appearances in the UEFA Champions League, including qualifying games)	0	—		23	1
2000	Molde	Tippeligaen	17	0	1	0	2	0	—		20	0
2001	Molde	Tippeligaen	21	1	3	0	—		—		24	1
2002	Molde	Tippeligaen	4	0	1	0	—		—		5	0
2003	Molde	Tippeligaen	13	0	3	0	5 (Note: Four appearances in UEFA Cup, including qualifying games against Klaksvík)	0	—		21	0
2005	Molde	Tippeligaen	6	0	1	0	—		2 (Note: Two appearances in Tippeligaen Relegation play-offs)	0	9	0
2006	Molde	Tippeligaen	16	0	1	0	2 (Note: Three appearances in UEFA Cup, including qualifying games against Skonto)	0	—		19	0
2007	Molde	Adeccoligaen	16	1	0	0	—		—		16	1
Career Total			173	4	22	0	20	0	2	0	217	4

== Personal life ==
Singsaas currently lives in Steinkjer Municipality with his wife and two children.

His father is former referee Terje Singsaas.

== Honours ==
Molde FK

- Norwegian Cup: 2005
