= André Hanssen =

Norwegian footballer (born 1981)

Personal information
- Date of birth: 31 January 1981 (age 45)
- Place of birth: Tromsø, Norway
- Height: 1.78 m (5 ft 10 in)
- Position: Midfielder

Youth career
- Skjervøy IK

Senior career*
Years	Team	Apps	(Gls)
1999–2004	FK Bodø/Glimt	142	(10)
2004–2009	SC Heerenveen	33	(1)
2009	FK Bodø/Glimt	9	(0)
2010–2012	Strømsgodset IF	27	(0)

International career
1997	Norway U15	2	(0)
1997	Norway U16	2	(0)
1998	Norway U17	9	(0)
1999	Norway U18	2	(0)
2000	Norway U19	2	(0)
2000–2003	Norway U21	18	(0)
- * Club domestic league appearances and goals

André Hanssen (born 31 January 1981) is a former Norwegian footballer. His former teams are SC Heerenveen and FK Bodø/Glimt.

He was a prolific Norway youth international.

He received two knee operations in the 2007/08 season to repair damaged cartilages. He returned to training in January 2009, and played half a game for the reserve team on 2 February 2009, and left Heerenveen that summer when his contract was not renewed. On 10 August 2009, he returned to his former Bodø/Glimt, signing a short-term contract for the remainder of the season.

On 3 March 2010, Hanssen signed a three-year contract with Strømsgodset IF. He played regularly in the 2010 season, but re-injured his knee and spent the next two seasons almost entirely on the injured list. Because of the persistent injuries, he announced his retirement in June 2012.

== Career statistics ==
Season	Club	Division	League		Cup		Total	
Season	Club	Division	Apps	Goals	Apps	Goals	Apps	Goals
1999	Bodø/Glimt	Eliteserien	14	1	0	0	14	1
2000	Bodø/Glimt	Eliteserien	25	2	4	1	29	3
2001	Bodø/Glimt	Eliteserien	26	1	4	0	30	1
2002	Bodø/Glimt	Eliteserien	26	1	4	1	30	2
2003	Bodø/Glimt	Eliteserien	25	3	7	2	32	5
2004	Bodø/Glimt	Eliteserien	26	2	3	1	29	3
2009	Bodø/Glimt	Eliteserien	9	0	0	0	9	0
2010	Strømsgodset IF	Eliteserien	25	0	6	0	31	0
2011	Strømsgodset IF	Eliteserien	2	0	0	0	2	0
2012	Strømsgodset IF	Eliteserien	0	0	0	0	0	0
Career Total			178	10	28	5	206	15

== Honours ==
- KNVB Cup: 1
  - 2009
- Norwegian Football Cup:
  - 2010
