= Follese =

Village in Askøy Municipality, Norway

- Village
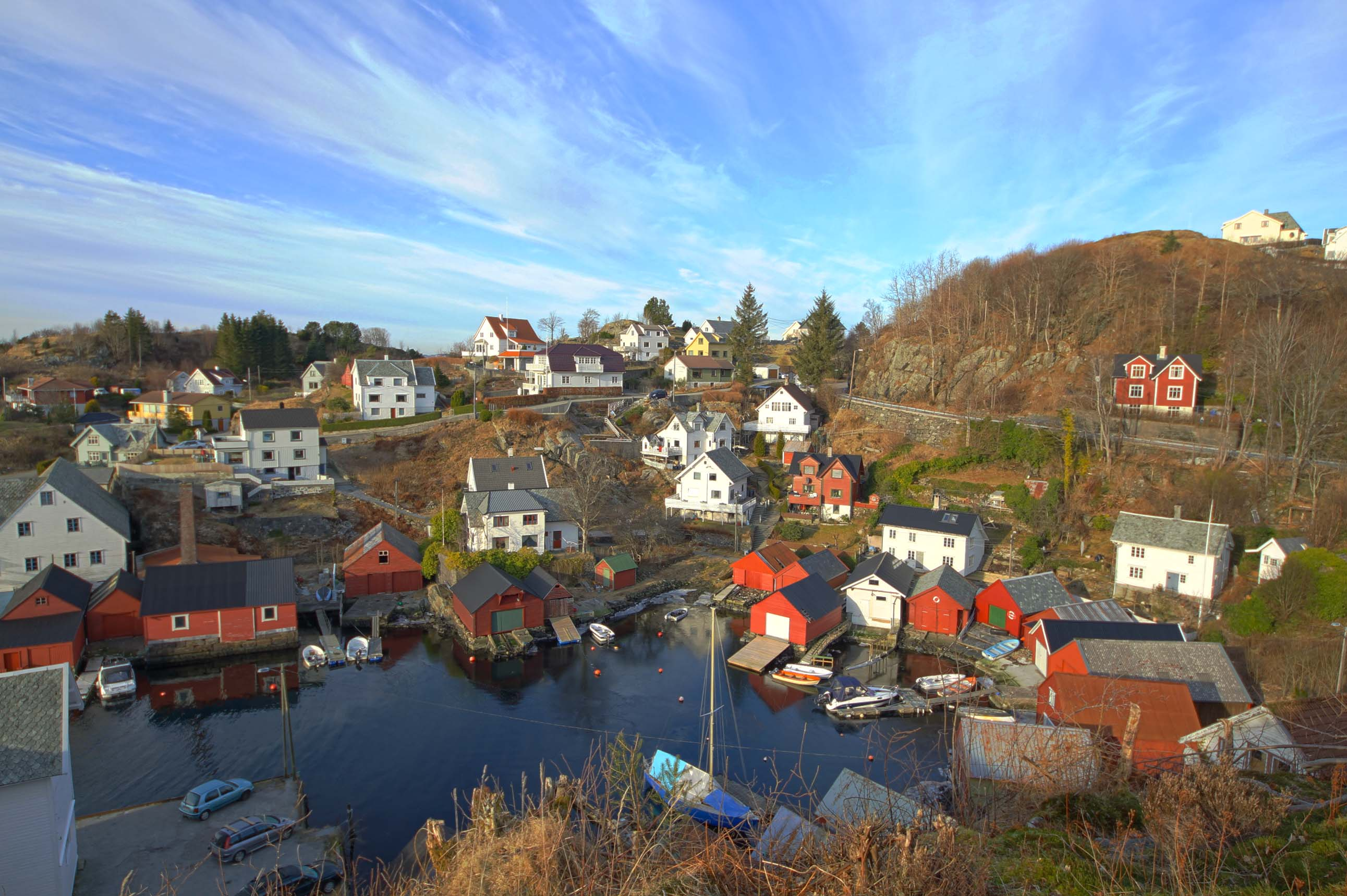
- View of the village
- Interactive map of Follese
- Coordinates: 60.41023°N 5.15436°E
- Country: Norway
- Region: Western Norway
- County: Vestland
- District: Midhordland
- Municipality: Askøy Municipality
- Elevation: 23 m (75 ft)

Population (2017)
  - Total: 2,539
- Time zone: UTC+01:00 (CET)
  - Summer (DST): UTC+02:00 (CEST)
- Post Code: 5303 Follese

Follese is a village in Askøy Municipality in Vestland county, Norway. The village is located on the island of Askøy about 2 kilometres (1.2 mi) northwest of the village of Strusshamn and about 4 kilometres (2.5 mi) west of the village of Kleppestø. As of 2017, Follese had 2539 inhabitants including the area of Hetlevik to the north.

== History ==
Until the Reformation, most of Askøy island was church and monastery property, but then became crown property – the King's property. Shortly afterwards, the king sold much of the estate to rich men who realized that buying royal estates was a good investment. In this way, Jan von der Lippe, a merchant from Bergen, became the owner of gårdsnummer 12 in Follese.

In 1756, he put the farm up for sale, and five of the builders, later known as the "owners", bought the whole thing – Follese inland and outland, Skogen, Skiftesvik, and Marikoven with associated islands and islets. The other users were builders as before, and had to pay their fee to the "owners".

Between the World Wars, United Sardines Factories ran a large canning factory on Follese with up to 150 employees. The entire factory was lost in a violent fire in 1939.

== Economy ==
Follese has a furniture, food, and plastics industry. There is also a small port for leisure boats.

Norwegian ice cream company, Isbjørn Is, is headquartered in Follese.
