= Sveinung Fjeldstad =

Norwegian footballer (born 1978)

Personal information
- Date of birth: 26 August 1978 (age 48)
- Place of birth: Gjøvik, Norway
- Height: 1.93 m (6 ft 4 in)
- Position: Striker

Youth career
- SK Gjøvik-Lyn

Senior career*
Years	Team	Apps	(Gls)
1994–1998	SK Gjøvik-Lyn	?	(?)
1999	Raufoss IL	40	(3)
1999–2002	Lillestrøm SK	39	(8)
2001	→HamKam (Loan)	8	(3)
2002	→Odd Grenland (Loan)	1	(0)
2002–2004	HamKam	50	(21)
2006	SK Gjøvik-Lyn	15	(7)
- * Club domestic league appearances and goals as of 27 May 2009

Sveinung Fjeldstad (born 26 August 1978) is a retired Norwegian football striker.

Sveinung was the first player in the Norwegian top division to fail a drug test, he tested positive for steroids during training on 21 April 2004. He was released from his contract with HamKam and was suspended in 2004 and 2005.
