= Jardel =

Jardel is a Portuguese name. It may refer to:

- Jardel (futsal player) (Bruno Miguel de Almeida Lima Gomes Bernardo), Portuguese futsal player
- Diego Jardel (born 1989), Brazilian footballer
- Jardel Filho (1928–1983), Brazilian film actor
- Jardel (footballer, born 1983), Brazilian footballer
- Jardel (footballer, born 1986), Brazilian footballer
- Jardel (footballer, born 1997), Bissau-Guinean footballer
- Jardel Pizzinato (born 1978), Brazilian handball player
- Jardel Santana (born 1978), Brazilian footballer
- Mário Jardel (born 1973), Brazilian footballer
