= Bjørn Otto Bragstad =

Norwegian footballer (born 1971)

Personal information
- Full name: Bjørn Otto Bragstad
- Date of birth: 5 January 1971 (age 55)
- Place of birth: Trondheim, Norway
- Height: 1.94 m (6 ft 4 in)
- Position: Central defender

Youth career
- Utleira
- Rosenborg

Senior career*
| Years | Team | Apps | (Gls) |
| 1989–2000 | Rosenborg | 195 | (26) |
| 2000–2002 | Derby County | 12 | (0) |
| 2001 | → Birmingham City (loan) | 3 | (0) |
| 2002–2004 | SW Bregenz | 41 | (2) |
| Total | | 251 | (28) |

International career
| 1999–2000 | Norway | 15 | (0) |
- * Club domestic league appearances and goals

Bjørn Otto Bragstad (born 5 January 1971) is a Norwegian former professional footballer who played as a central defender.

== Club career ==
Bragstad came through the youth ranks at Rosenborg before making his senior debut in the 1989 season. He scored 26 goals in 194 matches for them. In 2000, he joined English team Derby. Playing just 12 league matches, and scoring twice in a League Cup tie against West Bromwich Albion, he failed to make a significant impact at the club and went on loan to Birmingham where he would only play three matches the following season. He eventually departed Derby halfway through the 2002–03 season. He spent the rest of his career in Austria with Bregenz before retiring in the summer of 2004.

== International career ==
He made his debut for Norway in a January 1999 friendly match against Israel and was capped 15 times. His last international match was an August 2000 friendly against Finland. Bragstad was a squad player at the Euro 2000 and played in all three matches for Norway.

== Honours ==
Rosenborg BK

- Norwegian top division: 1990, 1992, 1993, 1994, 1995, 1997, 1998, 1999, 2000
- Norwegian Cup: 1992, 1995, 1999

== Personal life ==
He is the father of Emilie Bragstad.
