= Fredrik Kjølner =

Norwegian footballer (born 1970)

Personal information
- Full name: Fredrik Kjølner
- Date of birth: 22 April 1970 (age 56)
- Place of birth: Nøtterøy, Norway
- Height: 1.96 m (6 ft 5 in)
- Position: Central defender

Team information
- Current team: FK Tønsberg
- Number: 16

Youth career
- Nøtterøy IF

Senior career*
Years	Team	Apps	(Gls)
1987–1989	Nøtterøy IF		
1990–1993	Eik-Tønsberg		
1994–1999	Vålerenga	145	(1)
2000–2001	Molde	24	(0)
2001–2005	Bodø/Glimt	122	(6)
2006–2008	Sandefjord	63	(2)
2009	FK Tønsberg		

Managerial career
- 2009–present: FK Tønsberg (youth coach)
- * Club domestic league appearances and goals

Fredrik Kjølner (born 22 April 1970) is a Norwegian footballer. Since 1994 he has played almost 300 league matches in Norway, and captained FK Bodø/Glimt. At the end of 2005 Glimt was relegated from the Norwegian Premier League, and Kjølner moved to his native Nøtterøy Municipality, signing a contract with Sandefjord Fotball. Ahead of the 2009 season he signed for FK Tønsberg as player and youth coach.
