= Håvard Halvorsen =

Norwegian footballer (born 1973)

Håvard Halvorsen (born 20 May 1973) is a Norwegian football defender.

He was born in Trondheim, and joined Byåsen IL from Fauske/Sprint ahead of the 1996 season. He later joined FK Bodø/Glimt, and enjoyed several seasons in the Norwegian Premier League.
