= Jonny Hansen (footballer) =

Norwegian footballer (born 1981)

Personal information
- Date of birth: 12 January 1981 (age 45)
- Place of birth: Kristiansund, Norway
- Height: 1.88 m (6 ft 2 in)
- Position: Midfielder

Youth career
- Kristiansund

Senior career*
Years	Team	Apps	(Gls)
- Kristiansund
- Molde
2003–2004	Aalesund		
2005–2006	Skeid		
2008–2010	Strømmen		
2011–2012	IF Fram Larvik		
- * Club domestic league appearances and goals

Jonny Hansen (born 12 January 1981) is a Norwegian former footballer who last played as a midfielder for IF Fram Larvik.

He was born in Kristiansund, and started his career in Kristiansund FK, later joining Molde FK. Ahead of the 2003 season he joined Aalesunds FK, where he got seven Norwegian top division games in the 2003 season. Ahead of the 2005 season he joined Skeid Fotball, leaving that club after the 2006 season. In 2008, he joined Strømmen IF. After three seasons he went on to Fram Larvik, where he ended his playing career after one season.
