= Frode Eike Hansen =

Norwegian footballer (born 1972)

Frode Hansen
Personal information
- Full name: Frode Eike Hansen
- Date of birth: September 4, 1972 (age 54)
- Place of birth: Stavanger, Norway
- Height: 1.87 m (6 ft 1 1/2 in)
- Position: Defender

Senior career*
| Years | Team | Apps | (Gls) |
| –1997 | Vidar | | |
| 1998–2000 | Viking | 51 | (4) |
| 2001–2003 | Lyn | 54 | (3) |
| 2003–2005 | Viking | 58 | (0) |
- * Club domestic league appearances and goals

Frode Eike Hansen (born September 4, 1972), is a former Norwegian professional footballer who played for Mosterøy, Vidar, Viking and Lyn. Hansen was above all a determined player and a strong tackler who gained a reputation as a no nonsense defender. He made his debut in the Norwegian Premier League for Viking in 1998, playing a total of 163 games in the Norwegian top flight for Viking and Lyn. His most notable achievements were the UEFA Cup first round matches against Sporting Lisboa in 1999, where Viking won 3-1 on aggregate.

Hansen rose to fame towards the end of his career, when he moved from being a hard-working, but underestimated defender to being recognised as one of the most important players in the Viking team.
