= Ståle Rønningen =

Norwegian footballer (born 1978)

Personal information
- Date of birth: 13 February 1978 (age 48)
- Height: 1.79 m (5 ft 10 in)
- Position: Winger

Youth career
- –1994: Sunndal
- 1996–1997: Molde

Senior career*
Years	Team	Apps	(Gls)
1994–1995	Sunndal		
1998–2002	Molde	2	(0)
1998–1999	→ Kongsvinger (loan)	10	(0)
2001–2002	→ L/F Hønefoss (loan)		
2002	→ Grindvoll (loan)		
2003–2005	Ull/Kisa		
2006–2007	Bærum		
2007–2009	Ull/Kisa		
2009–2016	Sunndal		

International career
1998	Norway U21	2	(0)
- * Club domestic league appearances and goals

Ståle Rønningen (born 13 February 1978) is a retired Norwegian football winger.

He came through the youth ranks of Sunndal and made his senior debut in the autumn of 1994. He later joined Molde FK's junior team, and ahead of the 1998 season he penned a five-year contract. He was also capped up to Norway U21.

Rønningen made his Molde debut in May 1998 against Kongsvinger. In the autumn of 1998 he went on a one-year loan to Kongsvinger, as he was undertaking compulsory military service in the district. He got 10 league games here. In 2001 another loan to L/F Hønefoss followed, playing 27 games in the 2001 1. divisjon. The loan was terminated in the summer of 2002, in favour of yet another loan to Grindvoll IL.

In 2003 he finally left Molde and signed for Ull/Kisa. Following a 1 1/2-year stint in Bærum he rejoined Ull/Kisa in the summer of 2007. In mid-2009 he moved home to Sunndal.
