= Idar Mathiassen =

Norwegian footballer (born 1976)

Idar Mathiassen (born 15 June 1976) is a Norwegian former professional footballer who played as a forward. He played for Åkra IL, SK Vard Haugesund and then Viking FK, appearing in 31 Eliteserien matches from 1998 to 2000. He later joined FK Haugesund and then Norwegian Third Division side Kopervik IL.
