= Bjørn Berland =

Norwegian footballer (born 1977)

Personal information
- Full name: Bjørn Berland
- Date of birth: 14 April 1977 (age 49)
- Place of birth: Sandnes, Norway
- Height: 1.86 m (6 ft 1 in)
- Position: Striker

Youth career
- Sandved
- Ulf-Sandnes

Senior career*
Years	Team	Apps	(Gls)
1997–2005	Viking	153	(31)
2013–2015	Bogafjell		

International career
1996	Norway U20	1	(0)
1998	Norway U21	4	(0)
- * Club domestic league appearances and goals

Bjørn Berland (born 14 April 1977) is a retired Norwegian footballer.

== Career ==
His career began in Sandved IL and then Ulf-Sandnes and joined Viking FK in 1997. He played 153 Norwegian Premier games from 1997 to 2005. In late 2005 he signed for Sandefjord Fotball, but instead retired two days later.

Berland never managed to play for Norway's senior team, but he played 4 matches for the U-21 team, making his debut in 1998 against Denmark U-21.

Long after his retirement, Berland returned as a hobby player in Bogafjell IL.
