= Arne Vidar Moen =

Norwegian footballer (born 1971)

Arne Vidar Moen (born 17 November 1971) is a retired Norwegian football defender.

He hails from Storsteinnes and started his youth career in Storsteinnes IL. He was signed by first-tier club Tromsø IL and made his debut in 1991. He won the 1996 Norwegian Football Cup for Tromsø played almost continuously on the first tier, from 1997 to 2000 for SK Brann and in 2001 for Lillestrøm SK. He rejoined Tromsø IL in 2002, now a First Division club, but they won promotion and Moen finished his career playing for Tromsø in the 2003, 2004 and 2005 Tippeligaen.
