= André Flem =

Norwegian footballer (born 1967)

Personal information
- Full name: André Hottran Flem
- Date of birth: 15 December 1967 (age 58)
- Place of birth: Kristiansund, Norway
- Position: Central defender

Youth career
- Clausenengen

Senior career*
Years	Team	Apps	(Gls)
–1988	Clausenengen		
1989–2003	Stabæk	266	(33)
- * Club domestic league appearances and goals

André Flem (born 15 December 1967) is a former Norwegian football player.

Flem started his career in the amateur club Clausenengen. He joined Stabæk in 1990, when the club played in the Norwegian Fourth Division. During the early 1990s, when Stabæk was promoted three times successively, Flem was a key player.

Flem was Stabæk's captain for many years. Flem managed to follow his team upwards in the league system, and proved himself capable of playing in the Norwegian Premier League where he played a total of nine seasons and was capped in 161 games, scoring 18 goals.

Flem played for Stabæk for 14 seasons. He retired from professional football in 2003, but was still attached to the club, doing administrative work. He was the third player to be elected into Stabæk's hall of fame. In 2008 he was hired as a digital information architect in the Football Association of Norway.
