= Eivind Eriksen =

Norwegian footballer (born 1973)

Personal information
- Date of birth: 28 February 1973 (age 53)
- Place of birth: Mehamn, Norway
- Height: 1.82 m (6 ft 0 in)
- Positions: Forward; midfielder

Senior career*
Years	Team	Apps	(Gls)
1996	Hamarkameratene	0	(0)
1996	Nordkinn	5	(0)
1997–98	Hammerfest	40	(51)
1999–2001	Bodø/Glimt	63	(7)
2002–04	Hønefoss	33	(8)
2005	Hammerfest	10	(11)
2006–07	Åmot		(4)
- * Club domestic league appearances and goals

Eivind Eriksen (born 28 February 1973) is a Norwegian footballer who played as a forward for Hamarkameratene, Nordkinn, Hammerfest, Bodø/Glimt, Hønefoss and Åmot.

== Club career ==
Eriksen played for Hamarkameratene in 1996, but played no league games, and moved to Nordkinn FK the following year. In 1997, Eriksen moved to Hammerfest FK, where he scored a record breaking 40 goals in the 1997 season. In 1999, he moved to Bodø/Glimt, where he scored his first Tippeligaen goal on 10 April 1999 in the match against Vålerenga (1–1).

He continued to play for Bodø/Glimt in the Tippeligaen for the next three seasons, but moved on to Hønefoss in winter 2002. He made his debut for Hønefoss in the Norwegian First Division on 14 April 2002 in a match against Åsane. His first league goal for Hønefoss came at home against Skeid on 21 April of the same year (1–2). In total, he played 33 league games and scored eight goals across three seasons for Hønefoss.

In 2005, he chose to return to Hammerfest FK. For the next two seasons, he played for Åmot before retiring.
