= Karl Oskar Fjørtoft =

Norwegian footballer and coach (born 1975)

Personal information
- Full name: Karl Oskar Fjørtoft
- Date of birth: 26 July 1975 (age 51)
- Place of birth: Ålesund, Norway
- Position: Midfielder

Youth career
- Fjørtoft

Senior career*
Years	Team	Apps	(Gls)
1991–1995	Hødd		
1996–1997	Rosenborg	17	(0)
1997–2002	Molde	145	(18)
2003–2004	Hammarby	42	(4)
2005–2008	Aalesund	70	(4)
2009–2011	Herd		

International career
1993–1994	Norway U18	6	(0)
1994–1997	Norway U21	31	(4)
1998	Norway U23	2	(0)
2004	Norway	1	(0)

Managerial career
- 2009–2010: AaFK Fortuna
- 2017–2018: Brattvåg
- 2020–2023: Herd
- 2024: AaFK Fortuna (assistant)
- 2025: AaFK Fortuna
- 2025–: Kristiansund (assistant)
- * Club domestic league appearances and goals

Karl Oskar Fjørtoft (born 26 July 1975) is a Norwegian football coach and former player.

== Club career ==
As an active player, Fjørtoft played for Hødd, Rosenborg BK, Molde FK, Swedish team Hammarby IF, Aalesund and Herd.

After the 2008 season, his contract with Aalesund was not renewed. In late December he was signed by SK Herd together with former teammate Lasse Olsen.

== International career ==
Fjørtoft played a total of 37 games and scored four goals for Norway at international youth level. He played 2 games for Norway's under-23 team. Fjørtoft was capped once for the senior team and made his only appearance on 22 January 2004 in Norway's 3–0 win over Sweden in an international friendly played in Hong Kong.

== Coaching career ==
Fjørtoft was head coach at former Toppserien team Fortuna Ålesund in 2009. Fjørtoft took over after the team finished the 2009 season in 12th, the bottom position, and were relegated. Fjørtoft left the club at the end of the 2010 season.

Fjørtoft became assistant coach at Aalesund in 2015 under head coach Trond Fredriksen, but was removed from this position in July 2016. He took over as assistant coach at Hødd three weeks later.

In 2017 and 2018, he coached Norwegian third tier club Brattvåg together with Rune Ulvestad.

== Personal life ==
He is a distant relative of fellow footballer Jan Åge Fjørtoft.
