= Pål Lydersen =

Norwegian footballer (born 1965)

Personal information
- Date of birth: 10 September 1965 (age 61)
- Place of birth: Kristiansand, Norway
- Height: 1.83 m (6 ft 0 in)
- Position: Left-back

Senior career*
Years	Team	Apps	(Gls)
1985–1991	IK Start	116	(13)
1991–1995	Arsenal	15	(0)
1994	→ IK Start (loan)	21	(2)
1995–1996	IK Start	37	(0)
1996–1997	Sturm Graz	18	(1)
1997–1999	Molde FK	59	(1)
Total		266	(17)

International career
1990–1994	Norway	20	(1)
- * Club domestic league appearances and goals

Pål Lydersen (born 10 September 1965) is a Norwegian former professional footballer who played as a left-back.

== Background ==
Lydersen played for IK Start, until he was signed by English club Arsenal in November 1991 for a £500.000 fee. He spent the first three months in the reserves, and made his league debut as a substitute in a 3-1 win over Wimbledon 28 March 1992 at Selhurst Park. Then he showed his versatility by appearing at left-back, right-back, in the centre of midfield, and as a sweeper, though he's made most of his first team appearances at right-back. However, he was unable to oust first-team regulars Lee Dixon and Nigel Winterburn, and played only 16 games in all competitions during his time at the club. His last start in Premier League was against Tottenham Hotspur 11 May 1993.

In February 1994, Lydersen went on loan to his old club IK Start for the 1994 Tippeligaen season and the move was made permanent when his contract was terminated by Arsenal in March 1995. On 21 February 1995, Arsenal’s manager George Graham, had lost his job after a Premier League inquiry found he had accepted an illegal £425,000 payment from Norwegian agent Rune Hauge following Arsenal’s recruiting of Lydersen and John Jensen, two of Hauge’s clients.

Lydersen went on to play for Sturm Graz in Austria and then onto Molde, before retiring at the end of the 1999 Tippeligaen season. He also won 20 caps for Norway, scoring one goal.

== Honours ==
- Kniksen award as Defender of the year: 1994
