= Terje Leonardsen =

Norwegian footballer (born 1976)

Personal information
- Date of birth: 23 December 1976 (age 49)
- Position: Striker

Team information
- Current team: Donn
- Number: 2

Senior career*
Years	Team	Apps	(Gls)
- Tveit
- Flint
–2003	Start		
2002	→ Sandefjord (loan)		
2004–2007	Tveit		
2008–present	Donn		

Managerial career
- Tveit (playing coach)
- * Club domestic league appearances and goals

Terje Leonardsen (born 23 December 1976) is a Norwegian football striker.

He started his career in Tveit IL, and also played for IL Flint before joining IK Start. He got ten Norwegian Premier League games in 1996, scoring two goals. Start then spent several seasons in the First Division, but was promoted after the 1999 season, as Leonardsen scored the decisive goal. He scored 7 goals in 24 Premier League games in 2000, despite having contracted TWAR in the summer. In 2002 he scored 4 goals in 15 games, before leaving in the summer, citing disappointment with the new head coach Guðjón Þórðarson. An agreement was soon made with Sandefjord Fotball, who loaned Leonardsen for the remainder of the season.

He returned to Start for the 2003 season, but after the season he left to become playing head coach of Tveit, then a fifth-tier club. In 2008, he joined FK Donn.
