= Tom Stenvoll =

Norwegian footballer and coach (born 1978)

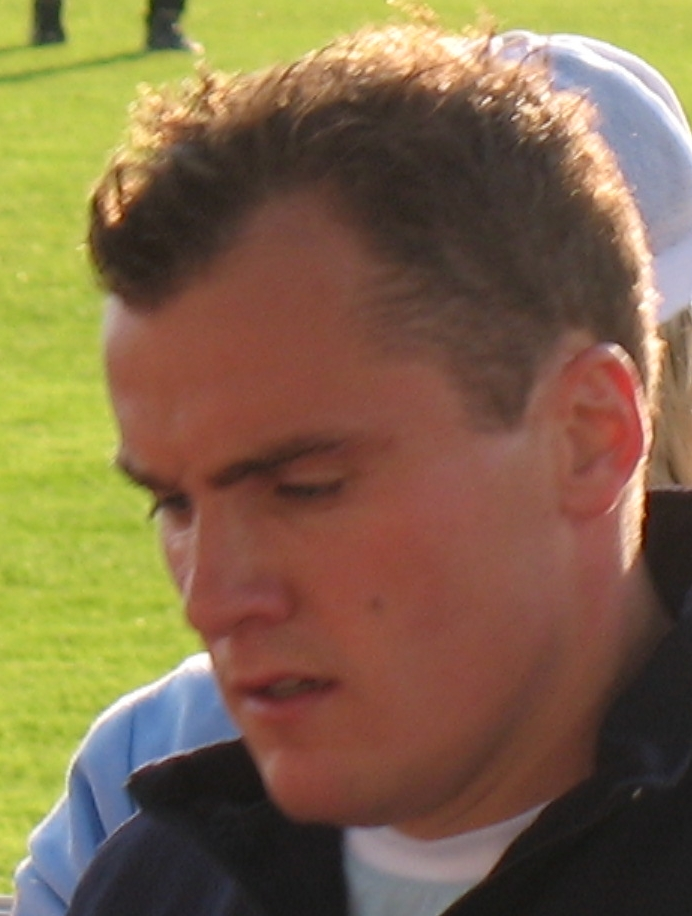

Personal information
- Full name: Tom Stenvoll
- Date of birth: 27 March 1978 (age 48)
- Place of birth: Andenes, Norway
- Height: 1.75 m (5 ft 9 in)
- Position: Left back

Youth career
- Andenes
- Stabæk

Senior career*
Years	Team	Apps	(Gls)
1998–2010	Stabæk	206	(12)

Managerial career
- 2011–2013: Stabæk women (assistant)
- 2015–2018: Andenes
- 2020–2022: Lyn women
- * Club domestic league appearances and goals

Tom Stenvoll (born 27 March 1978) is a Norwegian football coach and former player.

== Playing career ==
He played for Stabæk all of his professional career. Stabæk won the cup in 1998 and the league in 2008.

== Managing career ==
After retiring following the 2010 season, Stenvoll was hired as assistant coach for Stabæk Fotball Kvinner (women) under head coach Roger Finjord. He moved home to Andenes in the summer of 2013. He started out as manager of Andenes IL. In 2018 he was also hired as coach developer in Hålogaland District of Football, which caused him to step down at Andenes following the 2018 season. Ahead of the 2021 season, he was named as manager of Lyn Fotball Damer on a two-year leave from Hålogaland. The 2022 Toppserien season entailed Lyn's highest league placement ever, but Stenvoll did not renew his contract. Dagsavisen named him Oslo coach of the year.
