= Abildsø IL =

Norwegian sports club

- Full name: Abildsø Idrettslag
- Founded: 6 March 1935
- League: Men: 6. divisjon Oslo avd. 3 (tier 7)
- 2018: Men: 6. divisjon Oslo avd. 3 (tier 7), 9th
Home colours

Abildsø Idrettslag is a sports club in the suburb of Abildsø, Oslo.

The sports club has a membership of around 400.

== History ==
Abildsø Idrettslag was formed in September 1931, and competed in the Arbeidernes Idrettsforbund. The club had cycling, athletics, bandy, skiing, handball, and football on the programme. In the 1970s and 1980s, the ski team folded. The last decade has seen the football team become the focus of the club. In the 2001 season, the club had 21 teams competing. In addition, they had 7 teams run jointly with other clubs.

== Football ==
The club owns a large football field, and a club house with four changing rooms at Østensjøvannet. There are also two training pitches, two seven-a-side pitches, and two pitches for the women's side, as well as an all-weather pitch. Work began on a new all-weather pitch at Abildsø on 4 May 2009.

The club played in the Norwegian Second Division as late as in 1999.

== Recent seasons ==
=== Men ===
Season	Level	Division	Section	Position	Movements	Source
1999	Tier 3	2. divisjon	Oslo avd. 2	12th/12		
2000	Tier 7	6. divisjon	Oslo avd. 3	6th/10		
2001	Tier 7	6. divisjon	Oslo avd. 2	3rd/9		
2002	Tier 7	6. divisjon	Oslo avd. 3	8th/9		
2003	Tier 7	6. divisjon	Oslo avd. 2	8th/10		
2004	Tier 7	6. divisjon	Oslo avd. 1	6th/10		
2005	Tier 7	6. divisjon	Oslo avd. 2	5th/9		
2006	Tier 7	6. divisjon	Oslo avd. 2	2nd/10	Promoted	
2007	Tier 6	5. divisjon	Oslo avd. 2	4th/10		
2008	Tier 6	5. divisjon	Oslo avd. 1	6th/10		
2009	Tier 6	5. divisjon	Oslo avd. 3	7th/10		
2010	Tier 6	5. divisjon	Oslo avd. 3	2nd/10		
2011	Tier 6	5. divisjon	Oslo avd. 1	10th/10	Relegated	
2012	Tier 7	6. divisjon	Oslo avd. 2	2nd/10	Promoted	
2013	Tier 6	5. divisjon	Oslo avd. 1	2nd/10	Promoted	
2014	Tier 5	4. divisjon	Oslo avd. 1	9th/11		
2015	Tier 5	4. divisjon	Oslo avd. 2	10th/12		
2016	Tier 5	4. divisjon	Oslo avd. 2	12th/12	Relegated	
2017	Tier 6	5. divisjon	Oslo avd. 1	10th/10	Relegated	
2018	Tier 7	6. divisjon	Oslo avd. 3	9th/10		

=== Women ===
Season	Level	Division	Section	Position	Movements	Source
1999	Tier 3	2. divisjon	Østfold avd. 1	8th/9	Relegated	
2000	Tier 4	3. divisjon	Oslo avd. 1	5th/8		
2001	Tier 4	3. divisjon	Oslo	5th/10		
