= André Schei Lindbæk =

Norwegian footballer (born 1977)

André Lindbæk
Personal information
- Full name: André Schei Lindbæk
- Date of birth: 1 November 1977 (age 48)
- Place of birth: Oslo, Norway
- Position: Striker

Youth career
- Lyn Oslo

Senior career*
Years	Team	Apps	(Gls)
1995	Nordstrand		
1996	Drøbak/Frogn		
1997	Abildsø		
1998	→Kongsvinger	5	(1)
1999	Skeid	20	(12)
1999–2002	Molde	56	(19)
2002–2003	Numancia	7	(0)
2003	Viking	10	(3)
2004	Las Palmas	5	(0)
2004–2006	Landskrona	12	(1)
2006	FH		
2007	Køge	13	(11)
2007	Start	0	(0)
2007–2008	Rot-Weiss Essen	12	(3)

International career
	Norway U21	5	(0)
- * Club domestic league appearances and goals

André Schei Lindbæk (born 1 November 1977) is a Norwegian former footballer who last played in Germany for Rot-Weiss Essen. He formerly played for Nordstrand, Drøbak/Frogn, Abildsø, Kongsvinger, Skeid, Molde, Numancia, Viking, Las Palmas, Landskrona, FH, Køge and Start.
