= Andreas Lund =

Norwegian footballer (born 1975)

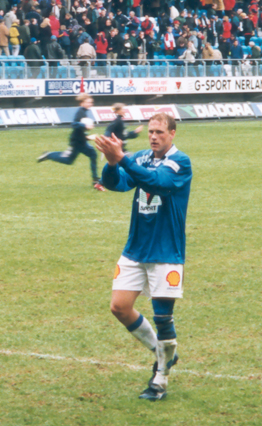
- Lund in 1999

Personal information
- Full name: Torkjell Andreas Lund
- Date of birth: 7 May 1975 (age 51)
- Place of birth: Kristiansand, Norway
- Height: 6 ft 2 in (1.88 m)
- Position: Striker

Senior career*
Years	Team	Apps	(Gls)
1995–1996	Start	37	(13)
1996–2000	Molde	59	(42)
2000–2002	Wimbledon	12	(2)
2000	→ Molde (loan)	3	(0)
2009	FC Lund		
Total		110	(57)

International career
1998	Norway U21	3	(0)
1999–2000	Norway	8	(4)
- * Club domestic league appearances and goals

Torkjell Andreas Lund (born 7 May 1975), known as Andreas Lund, is a Norwegian former footballer who played as a striker.

== Club career ==
Lund had a successful career in Norway and scoring 55 league goals in 96 matches for IK Start and Molde FK. For the latter, he scored four goals in the 1999–2000 UEFA Champions League: the first in the second leg of the third qualifying round against Mallorca, which was the club's first away goal at the UEFA Champions League and also granted a spot at the group stage in their debut appearance and three against Olympiacos (one at Greece and two at home).

He was signed by Wimbledon for £2.8 million in 2000. During his spell with the Dons, he scored against Chelsea and Arsenal, but failed to help the team avoid relegation to Football League First Division and was criticized by the English press.

He was loaned back to Molde after being out Terry Burton's long-term plans and was close to be signed by Porto, who he played against in the Champions League in the previous season, but returned to Wimbledon after suffering with injuries while playing in Norway.

== International career ==
Lund was part of the Norway U20 national team who finished in third place in the 1998 UEFA European Under-21 Championship. He earned eight caps and scored four goals for the senior national team, making his debut and his first international goal in a friendly against Jamaica in 1999. He also scored in his second international match against Lithuania and his last two international goals against Denmark in 2000.

He was nominated in the provisional squad for the UEFA Euro 2000 and was the last to be cut from the final squad.

== Retirement ==
Lund decided to retire in 2002 after failing to recover from a serious knee injury sustained in July 2000 during the preseason and worked as a salesman in his hometown Kristiansand after retiring.

He attempted to make a return in 2009 with fellow footballer Frank Strandli when both joined FC Lund, a club in the Norwegian sixth tier. Although he scored on his debut, he later decided to quit claiming that he still felt pain in his knee and that he could not play if he trained, and vice versa.
