= Odd Inge Olsen =

Norwegian footballer (born 1969)

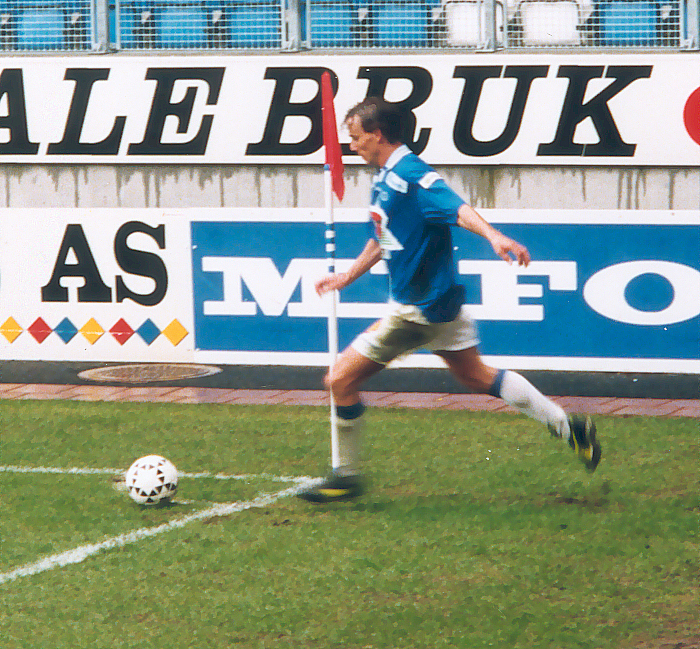
Odd Inge Olsen

Odd Inge Olsen (born 28 December 1969) is a former footballer who played for Molde FK 1997-2001, and Rosenborg BK 2001-2004. He also represented the Norway national team on two occasions in 1997.

Olsen played midfield and defence, but also scored a hat-trick when Molde won 4–0 against Brann in the 97/98 season.
