= Tommy Bergersen =

Norwegian footballer and coach (born 1972)

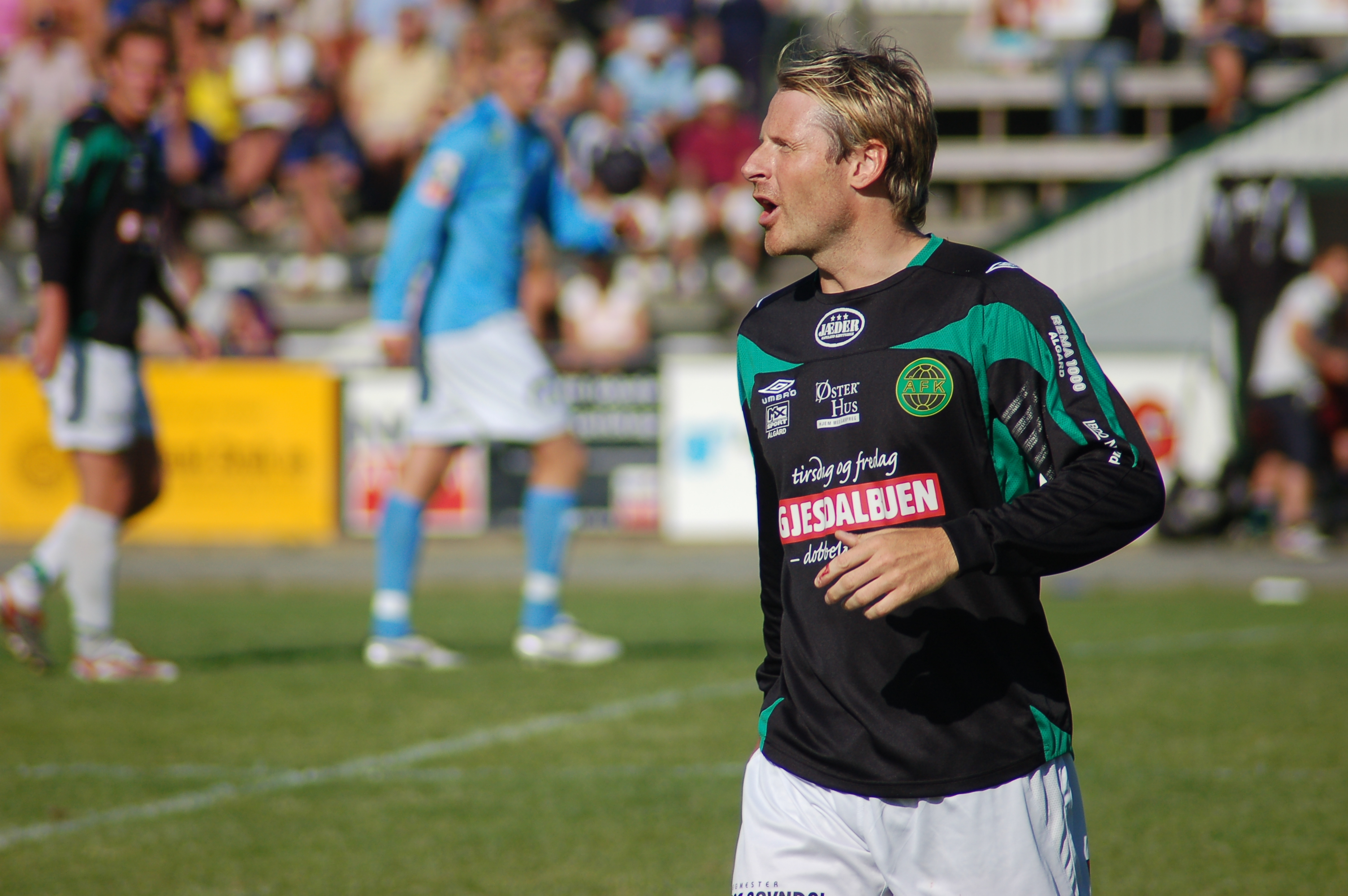

Personal information
- Full name: Tommy Bergersen
- Date of birth: 16 October 1972 (age 54)
- Place of birth: Norway
- Height: 1.81 m (5 ft 11 1/2 in)
- Position: Midfielder

Youth career
- Bossmo & Ytteren
- Stålkameratene

Senior career*
Years	Team	Apps	(Gls)
1992–1993	Bryne	12	(14)
1994	FC Lyn Oslo	19	(8)
1995–1996	Viking	31	(5)
1997–2001	Bodø/Glimt	78	(31)
2002–2005	GIF Sundsvall	74	(13)
2005–2006	Bryne	7	(1)

Managerial career
- 2010–2011: Bryne
- * Club domestic league appearances and goals as of 30 December 2007

Tommy Bergersen (born 16 October 1972) is a Norwegian football coach and former football midfielder.

== Club career ==
He last played for Bryne. His career peaked when he played for Viking and Bodø/Glimt in the Norwegian Premier League.

== Manager years ==
Bergersen was first manager for Ålgård FK. Bergersen started the job in January 2007. In November 2009 he started to be the manager for Bryne FK. He signed a three-year contract with the club.
