= 2008 Norwegian Football Cup =

Norgesmesterskapet i fotball for herrer

Tournament details
- Country: Norway
- Teams: 128 (main competition)

Final positions
- Champions: Vålerenga (4th title)
- Runners-up: Stabæk

Tournament statistics
- Matches played: 127
- Goals scored: 518 (4.08 per match)
- Top goal scorer(s): Mohammed Abdellaoue; Veigar Pall Gunnarson (7 goals each)

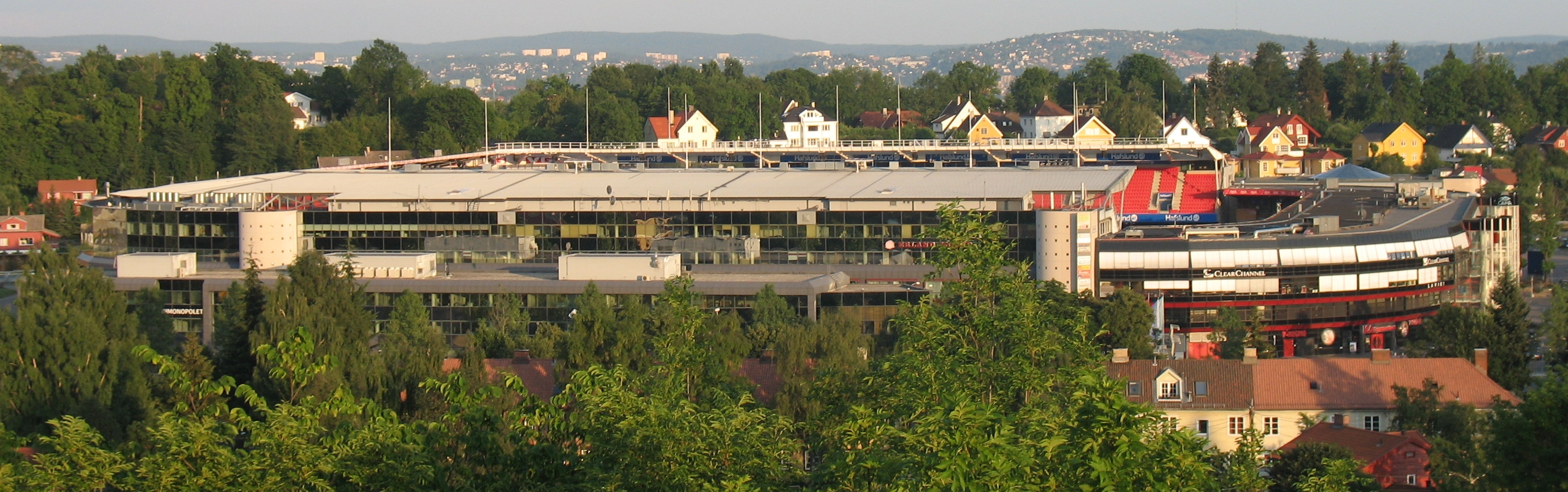
Ullevaal Stadion, Oslo - venue for the Norwegian Cup final

The 2008 Norwegian Football Cup was the 103rd season of Norwegian annual knockout football tournament. The competition started on 10 May 2008 with the first-round games and ended on 9 November 2008 with the final. The defending champions were Lillestrøm.

The format of the Cup has not changed for this season what means that, unlike other European cup competitions, all teams (including Tippeligaen ones) entered the Cup in the First Round. In the First and Second Round amateur teams (or at least lower-placed at the time of the draw) were seeded and played the matches at home ground. From the Third Round until the end the draw was random.

The winners, Vålerenga, qualified for the third qualifying round of the 2009–10 UEFA Europa League.

== Calendar ==
Below are the dates for each round as given by the official schedule:

Round	Date(s)	Number of fixtures	Clubs
First round	10–12 May 2008	64	128 → 64
Second round	3–8 June 2008	32	64 → 32
Third round	1–3 July 2008	16	32 → 16
Fourth round	30 July 2008	8	16 → 8
Quarter-finals	15–17 August 2008	4	8 → 4
Semi-finals	24–25 September 2008	2	4 → 2
Final	9 November 2008	1	2 → 1

== First round ==
The games were played on 10 and 12 May 2008.

Team 1	Score	Team 2
10 May 2008
Elnesvågen/Omegn	0–6	Molde
Ørn Horten	0–5	Vålerenga
Drøbak/Frogn	0–2	Korsvoll
Fana	2–0	Fyllingen
Follesse	1–3	Åsane
Lørenskog	2–0	Skjetten
Mandalskameratene	3–2	Vard Haugesund
Mjøndalen	0–1	Asker
Namsos	1–2	Levanger
Stavanger	3–1	Randaberg
Strindheim	1–4	Steinkjer
Tromsdalen	6–2	Lofoten
Ull/Kisa	1–0	Strømmen
Østsiden	1–2 (a.e.t.)	Pors Grenland
Tønsberg	4–2	Modum
12 May 2008
Groruddalen	1–4	Manglerud Star
Førde	1–3	Aalesund
Harstad	1–6	Lyn
Loddefjord	1–4	Brann
Mjølner	0–3	Bodø/Glimt
Mysen	1–6	Fredrikstad
Sandar	1–3	Lillestrøm
Sander	0–2	HamKam
Skjervøy	0–2	Tromsø
Tynset	0–11	Rosenborg
Vestfossen	0–14	Stabæk
Vidar	0–3	Viking
Øvrevoll Hosle	2–7 (a.e.t.)	Strømsgodset
Austevoll	1–1 (4–1 p)	Nest-Sotra
Averøykameratene	1–2	Kristiansund
Borgar	0–3	Sarpsborg Sparta
Bossekop	0–2	Alta
Brumunddal	2–4	Eidsvold TF
Bøler	1–3	Sprint-Jeløy
Charlottenlund	2–3 (a.e.t.)	Ranheim
Lillehammer	1–2 (a.e.t.)	Nybergsund
Arendal	1–6	Fløy
Fram Larvik	2–0	Bærum
Frigg	2–3	Notodden
Gjøvik Lyn	0–3	Kongsvinger
Grorud	0–3	Follo
KFUM Oslo	2–0	Kjelsås
Kongsberg	1–4	Sandefjord
Kopervik	2–4	Ålgård
Kvik Halden	0–2	Moss
Langevåg	0–6	Skarbøvik
Nardo	2–0	KIL/Hemne
Nord	0–4	Bryne
NTNUI	2–1	Byåsen
Sandviken	0–3	Os
Senja	3–4	Skarp
Skarphedin	1–5	Odd Grenland
Solberg	0–3	Raufoss
Stord	1–3	Haugesund
Stålkameratene	0–3	Mo
Søgne	0–2	Start
Tornado Måløy	0–3	Sogndal
Toten	0–2	Valdres
Trauma	0–6	Vindbjart
Ullern	1–4	Hønefoss
Valder	2–4	Hødd
Vollen	2–6	Skeid
Voss	0–3	Løv-Ham
Åkra	0–4	Sandnes Ulf

== Second round ==
The games were played between 3 and 8 June 2008.

Team 1	Score	Team 2
3 June 2008
Skeid	2–3	Fredrikstad
Vindbjart	0–4	Odd Grenland
4 June 2008
KFUM Oslo	0–3	Strømsgodset
Fram Larvik	0–2	Stabæk
Alta	6–2	Tromsdalen
Asker	1–0	Notodden
Fløy	1–3	Bryne
Hødd	4–1	NTNUI
Kongsvinger	4–2	Lørenskog
Korsvoll	1–3	Lyn
Manglerud Star	2–1	Nybergsund
Os	0–4	Haugesund
Pors Grenland	6–3	Hønefoss
Ranheim	8–0	Nardo
Sandefjord	4–0	Mandalskameratene
Skarbøvik	1–6 (a.e.t.)	Sogndal
Sprint-Jeløy	0–6	Moss
Start	2–1	Tønsberg
Stavanger	0–2	Viking
Steinkjer	1–1 (2–4 p)	Molde
Ålgård	2–3	Sandnes Ulf
Åsane	4–5 (a.e.t.)	Aalesund
5 June 2008
Eidsvold TF	1–0	Lillestrøm
Mo	0–3	Bodø/Glimt
Skarp	2–5	Tromsø
Follo	0–2	Sarpsborg Sparta
Levanger	0–4	Ullensaker/Kisa
Løv-Ham	4–0	Fana
7 June 2008
Austevoll	2–3	Brann
Kristiansund	1–1 (5–2 p)	Rosenborg
8 June 2008
Raufoss	1–4	Vålerenga
Valdres	2–1	HamKam

== Third round ==
The games were played between 1 and 9 July 2008.

Team 1	Score	Team 2
1 July 2008
Brann	3–1	Valdres
Ranheim	0–3	Tromsø
2 July 2008
Bodø/Glimt	3–1	Alta
Lyn	4–0	Asker
Molde	2–1 (a.e.t.)	Kristiansund
Stabæk	5–0	Manglerud Star
Strømsgodset	4–0	Pors Grenland
Viking	3–0	Eidsvold TF
Bryne	1–4	Løv-Ham
Haugesund	3–2	Sandnes Ulf
Moss	2–3	Start
Odd Grenland	2–0	Sandefjord
Sogndal	3–0	Kongsvinger
3 July 2008
Sarpsborg Sparta	2–3	Vålerenga
Ull/Kisa	0–1	Fredrikstad
Hødd	1–2	Aalesund

== Fourth round ==
The games were played between 23 July and 6 August 2008.

23 July 2008
19:00 CEST (UTC+2)

Molde	8–0	Brann
Mota 5'; M. Diouf 15', 52', 55'; Hoseth 33', 53', 86'; Hestad 62'	Report

Aker Stadion, Molde
Attendance: 4,452
Referee: Espen Berntsen (Vang)

23 July 2008
19:00 CEST (UTC+2)

Tromsø	0–2 (a.e.t.)	Vålerenga
	Report	Zajić 97'; Abdellaoue 118'

Alfheim Stadion, Tromsø
Attendance: 2,547
Referee: Roy Helge Olsen (Fløy)

30 July 2008
18:00 CEST (UTC+2)

Bodø/Glimt	3–1	Haugesund
Johansen 12'; Rønning 43'; Konradsen 90'	Report	Nilsen 75'

Aspmyra Stadion, Bodø
Attendance: 1,828
Referee: Tom Henning Øvrebø (Nordstrand)

30 July 2008
18:00 CEST (UTC+2)

Fredrikstad	5–2	Løv-Ham
Barsom 21', 51', 86'; Kvisvik 26'; Tegström 39'	Report	Vange 48'; Šarić 75'

Fredrikstad Stadion, Fredrikstad
Attendance: 2,731
Referee: Roy Helge Olsen (Fløy)

30 July 2008
18:00 CEST (UTC+2)

Sogndal	1–3	Stabæk
Risholt 37'	Report	Gunnarsson 42'; Stenvoll 75', 89'

Fosshaugane Campus, Sogndalsfjøra
Attendance: 2,018
Referee: Kjell Alseth (Stjørdals/Blink)

30 July 2008
18:00 CEST (UTC+2)

Start	2–3	Odd Grenland
Fevang 34'; Hulsker 49'	Report	Bentley 35'; Kovács 56'; Larsen 88'

Sør Arena, Kristiansand
Attendance: 4,320
Referee: Jonny Ditlefsen (Mo)

30 July 2008
18:00 CEST (UTC+2)

Aalesund	1–4	Lyn
Aarøy 49'	Report	Holmen 29', 88'; Simonsen 64'; Guastavino 90+3'

Color Line Stadion, Ålesund
Attendance: 2,841
Referee: Kjetil Sælen (Arna-Bjørnar)

6 August 2008
18:00 CEST (UTC+2)

Strømsgodset	3–2	Viking
Nielsen 2', 31'; George 44'	Report	Ødegaard 69'; Gaarde 90'

Marienlyst Stadion, Drammen
Attendance: 2,410
Referee: Per Ivar Staberg (Harstad)

== Quarter-finals ==
15 August 2008
19:00 CEST (UTC+2)

Lyn	1–3 (a.e.t.)	Molde
Angan 98'	Report	P. P. Diouf 100'; Forren 103'; Hoseth 119'

Ullevaal Stadion, Oslo
Attendance: 2,750
Referee: Svein-Erik Edvartsen (Hamar)

16 August 2008
19:00 CEST (UTC+2)

Odd Grenland	2–2	Fredrikstad
Kovács 12'; Bentley 36'	Report	Barsom 58'; Wehrman 63' (pen.)
Penalties
Kovács (penalty missed); Gulsvik (penalty scored); Jensen (penalty scored); Fevang (penalty scored); Hansén (penalty scored); Valencia (penalty scored)	5–4	(penalty scored) Gashi; (penalty scored) Trulsen; (penalty scored) Fofana; (penalty missed) Czwartek; (penalty scored) Barsom; (penalty missed) Gerrbrand

Skagerak Arena, Skien
Attendance: 8,054
Referee: Kristoffer Helgerud (Lier)

17 August 2008
16:00 CEST (UTC+2)

Vålerenga	3–1	Bodø/Glimt
Shelton 15'; Fredheim Holm 44'; Abdellaoue 65'	Report	Olsen 26'

Ullevaal Stadion, Oslo
Attendance: 6,616
Referee: Svein Oddvar Moen (Haugar)

17 August 2008
19:00 CEST (UTC+2)

Stabæk	4–1	Strømsgodset
Farnerud 63'; Nannskog 68'; Gunnarsson 81', 88'	Report	Bergdølmo 40'

Nadderud Stadion, Bærum
Attendance: 3,609
Referee: Terje Hauge (Olsvik)

== Semi-finals ==
24 September 2008
19:00 CEST (UTC+2)

Stabæk	3–0	Molde
Nannskog 30', 90+2'; Farnerud 76'	Report

Nadderud Stadion, Bærum
Attendance: 4,880
Referee: Per Ivar Staberg (Harstad)

25 September 2008
19:00 CEST (UTC+2)

Vålerenga	2–1	Odd Grenland
Abdellaoue 30'; Sæternes 37'	Report	Dokken 21'

Ullevaal Stadion, Oslo
Attendance: 9,563
Referee: Espen Berntsen (Vang)

== Final ==
9 November 2008
13:15 CET (UTC+1)

Stabæk	1–4	Vålerenga
Andersson 69'	Report	Abdellaoue 31', 54'; Fredheim Holm 50', 70'

Ullevaal Stadion, Oslo
Attendance: 24,823
Referee: Svein Oddvar Moen (Haugar)
