= Steinar Lein =

Norwegian footballer (born 1971)

Personal information
- Date of birth: 26 July 1971 (age 55)
- Position: Midfielder

Youth career
- Kolstad

Senior career*
Years	Team	Apps	(Gls)
–1993	Kolstad		
1994	Elverum		
1995	Kolstad		
1996	Byåsen		
1997–1998	Rosenborg	11	(1)
1999–2002	FK Haugesund	92	(12)
2003–2010	Vard Haugesund		

Managerial career
- 2007–2013: Vard Haugesund
- 2014–2016: Hødd (assistant)
- 2016: Hødd
- 2017: FK Haugesund (U19)
- 2017–2018: Haugar women
- 2019–2024: Rosenborg women
- * Club domestic league appearances and goals

Steinar Lein (born 26 July 1971) is a retired Norwegian football midfielder and current manager. Lein is mainly known as a player for Rosenborg and manager of Rosenborg women, as well as for his time in Haugesund where he played for FK Haugesund and Vard as well as managing Vard and SK Haugar's women.

== Early career ==
He played youth football for Kolstad, winning his age group in the 1986 Norway Cup. His father Arne Lein was a football coach in the same club. Not only Lein, but Kolstad teammates Harald Martin Brattbakk and Odd Inge Olsen also became professional footballers. Steinar Lein then played senior football for Kolstad.

In the early 1990s, Lein studied to become a physical education teacher at Hedmark University College campus in Elverum. For a period, he commuted with the Røros Line—a train fare taking several hours one way—to play matches for Kolstad. He spent the 1994 season in Elverum Fotball, and after another stint in Kolstad he joined Byåsen in 1996. Byåsen paid 60,000 kr.

Following his performance in the 1996 Norwegian First Division for Byåsen, Lein was invited to train and sign with Moss FK. Their manager Knut Thorbjørn Eggen knew Lein from his time in Trondheim. Instead, in 1997 Lein joined giants Rosenborg BK (managed by Knut Thorbjørn Eggen's father), making his league debut in the summer and amassing 11 league games over two seasons.

Lein did not play during Rosenborg's unprecedented victories in European competition, but sat on the bench as Rosenborg beat Real Madrid at home in 1997. Lein made his Eliteserien debut as a substitute against Bodø/Glimt in June 1997. A minor breakthrough came in July, when Lein scored his first Rosenborg goal against Lillestrøm in the league—celebrating with a "war dance" across half the pitch—then started the cup match where Lillestrøm again was the opponent. As Rosenborg came under 0–2 and 2–3, they ultimately won 5–3 after extra time, and Lein was praised for his technique, stamina and authority in the Roar Strand role.

With one year of his contract remaining, Rosenborg recommended that Lein found himself a new club. According to Adresseavisen, interest was shown from Kongsvinger, Moss, Start and Haugesund. The most tangible interest came from Haugesund, where Lein travelled to discuss transfer details.

== Time in Haugesund ==
He then settled in southwestern city of Haugesund, playing for FK Haugesund from 1999 through 2002 and Vard Haugesund from 2003 through 2010.

Haugesund invested significantly in the 1999 1. divisjon season, with a larger budget than at least 5 Eliteserien clubs, and the recruitment of foreign players Toni Tervonen, Magnus Samuelsson, Anders Blomquist in addition to Lein. VG tipped Haugesund in 1st place. According to Dagbladet, Lein was Haugesund's best paid player with a margin of 20%–25%. In addition to winning the 1999 First Division, in his first season he recorded some decisive performances during the 1999 Norwegian Football Cup. In the second round, minnows Kopervik held Haugesund to 0–0 until the 85th minute. Lein scored two quick goals to put Haugesund through. In the third round, he scored a hat-trick in a 5–1 thrashing of Strømsgodset.

In late 1999 Lein broke a bone in his foot. The surgery was not successful due to a misplaced screw. In March 2000, speculation arose that his football career might be over. At the very least, a new surgery was needed. When the time came to consider a renewal of his contract in 2002, Lein was again incapacitated during parts of the season. Falling out of favour with the fans, he somewhat redeemed himself with two goals against Mandalskameratene in October, which meant that Haugesund could still reach the promotion playoff. When Haugesund ultimately failed to win promotion from the 2002 1. divisjon, the club faced a dire financial situation. The club had to cut a third of its budget, and proposed to halve the wages of several players including Lein. Declining the offer, he first and foremost considered a return to Byåsen, but for personal reasons he would stay in Haugesund until the summer. At the same time, he was among the most wanted players in Vard, from whom he ultimately accepted a contract offer. While the club was only semi-professional, the offer entailed a part-time job outside of football.

Among his notable performances for Vard in 2003 was the match against FK Vidar in June 2003. Lein scored 4 goals and was touted man of the match as Vard recorded a club-record 14–0 win over the hapless opponents. As Vard won promotion from the 2003 2. divisjon, Lein scored 19 league goals. After the 2004 season, FK Haugesund therefore wanted to re-sign Lein. Lein declined the chance to return to professional football, remaining in Vard. In the last match of the 2004 1. divisjon, Lein scored the winning goal in a 5–4 victory over Hødd. However, it did not prevent Vard from being relegated.

Ahead of the 2005 season, Lein was approached by Kolstad IL, who wanted him to start a managerial career there. He opted to stay in Haugesund. As Vard fought for promotion from the 2005 2. divisjon, the team still had a theoretical chance until the last round. Lein was declared Player of the Year by Vard's supporters. After Kjell Inge Bråtveit left Vard in late 2006, Lein came into question as Vard's new manager. He took over as player-manager in 2007.

== Managerial career ==
In the fall of 2008, Lein took a hiatus. He let Geir Amundsen take over as caretaker manager with 7 matches left, in other to turn things around after a weak start to the 2008 2. divisjon campaign. Lein would concentrate on playing. He retired as a player after the 2010 season. Continuing as manager, Lein led Vard to promotion from the 2012 2. divisjon. As the team experienced a meagre start of the 2013 1. divisjon season, Lein was sacked by Vard in May 2013. Lein described the process as "ridiculous". Vard were ultimately relegated on goal difference.

In 2014, Lein was named as assistant manager of IL Hødd under Sindre Eid, passing the UEFA A Licence before the season started. In June 2016, Lein was promoted to manager following the sacking of Hans Erik Eriksen.

His family resided in Haugesund while he worked in Ulsteinvik, so in 2017 he opted to return to Haugesund and became U19 coach of FK Haugesund. Already after one month, he resigned from that job, and instead took over SK Haugar's women.

Following two seasons in Haugar, Lein was signed by women's top-tier club Trondheims-Ørn in 2019. His main goal was to develop the players and introduce an "elite sport culture". In 2020 Trondheims-Ørn changed their name and identity to Rosenborg Kvinner. With Rosenborg finishing runners-up in the 2020, 2021 and 2023 Toppserien, Lein also led the team to the last round of the 2022-23 Champions League qualifying, but was eliminated by Real Madrid Femenino.

In 2023 he won his first trophy with Rosenborg, the 2023 Norwegian Women's Cup. At the same time, however, dissent towards Lein was mounting in the squad. After leading one training session in 2024, he stepped down as manager on 11 January.

In late 2024, Ranheim Fotball announced that Lein would take on a position as director of football in their academy from 2025.

== Personal life ==
While still new to the city Haugesund, Steinar Lein met Cathrine Sandvik, who also played football, for SK Haugar. He proposed on 1 January 2001, and they married in Skåre Church in May 2005. Their daughter Emilie Lein played for Haugar and Rosenborg, being continuously coached by her father until she moved to Lyn in September 2023. At the time, Emilie Lein had 1,8 million TikTok followers.
