= 2007 Norwegian Football Cup final =

- Event: 2007 Norwegian Football Cup
Haugesund	Lillestrøm
0	2
- Date: 11 November 2007
- Venue: Ullevaal Stadion, Oslo
- Referee: Per Ivar Staberg
- Attendance: 24,361

The 2007 Norwegian Football Cup final took place at Ullevaal Stadion in Oslo on 11 November 2007. The match was contested between heavy favorites Lillestrøm and underdogs Haugesund.

With Lillestrøm played in the top tier Tippeligaen and Haugesund in the second tier Adeccoligaen, the Norwegian media dubbed Lillestrøm the biggest favorites to win the cup final since Rosenborg met Fyllingen in 1990. Haugesund surprisingly made it to the cup final, becoming the first team outside Tippeligaen in 10 years to reach the final. However, players from Haugesund admitted to having been lucky with the draw in both the quarterfinals and semifinals, where Haugesund avoided the big clubs.

== Route to the final ==
Haugesund			Round	Lillestrøm		
Djerv 1919	A	6–1	Round 1	Flisa	A	6–3
Fløy	A	1–0 aet	Round 2	Orkla	A	5–0
Løv-Ham	H	4–0	Round 3	Bærum	H	4–0
Start	A	1–0	Round 4	Aalesund	H	1–0
Nybergsund	H	6–1	Quarterfinal	Lyn	A	1–0
Odd Grenland	H	1–0	Semifinal	Stabæk	H	2–0

== Match ==
=== Details ===
11 November 2007
13:15 CET (UTC+1)

Haugesund	0–2	Lillestrøm
	Report	Occean 57', 90'

Ullevaal Stadion, Oslo
Attendance: 24,361
Referee: Per Ivar Staberg (Harstad)

Haugesund	Lillestrøm

Haugesund:
GK	1	(Norway) Per Morten Kristiansen
DF	20	(Norway) Bjørn Strøm
DF	3	(Sweden) Elias Storm
DF	8	(Norway) Eirik Horneland (c)
DF	18	(Costa Rica) Carlos Castro	(substituted off) 86'
MF	17	(Norway) Dag Roar Ørsal
MF	15	(Costa Rica) Rodolfo Rodríguez
MF	4	(Norway) Svein Tore Brandshaug	(substituted off) 65'
FW	22	(Norway) Sten Ove Eike	(substituted off) 65'
FW	16	(United States) Cam Weaver
FW	14	(Norway) Stian Johnsen
Substitutions:
MF	7	(Norway) Petter Larsen	(substituted on) 65'
MF	11	(Norway) Tor Arne Andreassen	(substituted on) 65'
MF	6	(Norway) Jonas Johansen	(substituted on) 86'
GK		(Norway) Lars Øvernes
DF		(Norway) Arild Andersen
MF		(Scotland) Kevin Nicol
Coach:
(Norway) Rune Skarsfjord

Lillestrøm:
GK	26	(Finland) Otto Fredrikson
DF	2	(Norway) Anders Rambekk	(yellow card) 21'
DF	13	(Norway) Frode Kippe (c)
DF	23	(Norway) Pål Steffen Andresen
DF	15	(Norway) Marius Johnsen		(substituted off) 68'
MF	7	(Norway) Espen Søgård
MF	25	(Tunisia) Khaled Mouelhi
MF	14	(Norway) Simen Brenne
FW	11	(Norway) Magnus Myklebust		(substituted off) 58'
FW	30	(Canada) Olivier Occean
FW	10	(Norway) Bjørn Helge Riise
Substitutions:
FW	18	(Norway) Arild Sundgot		(substituted on) 58'
DF	18	(Australia) Shane Stefanutto	(yellow card) 79'	(substituted on) 68'
Coach:
(Norway) Tom Nordlie
