= 2003 Norwegian Second Division =

Norwegian football league season

The 2003 2. divisjon season was the third highest football league for men in Norway.

26 games were played in 4 groups, with 3 points given for wins and 1 for draws. Pors Grenland, Kongsvinger, Vard Haugesund and Tromsdalen were promoted to the 1. divisjon. Number twelve, thirteen and fourteen were relegated to the 3. divisjon. The winning teams from each of the 24 groups in the 3. divisjon each faced a winning team from another group in a playoff match, resulting in 12 playoff winners which were promoted to the 2. divisjon.

== League tables ==
=== Group 1 ===
Pos	Team	Pld	W	D	L	GF	GA	GD	Pts	Promotion or relegation
1	Pors Grenland	26	17	5	4	69	28	+41	56	Promotion to First Division
2	FK Tønsberg	26	12	10	4	57	35	+22	46	
3	Kvik Halden	26	13	7	6	52	41	+11	46	
4	Tollnes	26	11	9	6	53	45	+8	42	
5	Larvik Fotball	26	11	6	9	45	28	+17	39	
6	Frigg	26	10	9	7	46	43	+3	39	
7	Kjelsås	26	8	9	9	32	36	−4	33	
8	Stabæk 2	26	7	10	9	37	32	+5	31	
9	Sprint-Jeløy	26	7	9	10	42	52	−10	30	
10	Odd Grenland 2	26	8	6	12	38	54	−16	30	
11	Follo	26	8	5	13	36	48	−12	29	
12	Jerv (R)	26	6	8	12	40	59	−19	26	Relegation to Third Division
13	Borg Fotball (R)	26	5	9	12	35	56	−21	24	Relegation to Third Division
14	Runar (R)	26	5	6	15	35	60	−25	21	Relegation to Third Division

(R) Relegated

=== Group 2 ===
Pos	Team	Pld	W	D	L	GF	GA	GD	Pts	Promotion or relegation
1	Kongsvinger (P)	26	22	4	0	62	23	+39	70	Promotion to First Division
2	Ullensaker/Kisa	26	22	0	4	72	24	+48	66	
3	Nybergsund	26	16	7	3	74	30	+44	55	
4	Byåsen	26	15	1	10	54	45	+9	46	
5	Skjetten	26	14	3	9	65	43	+22	45	
6	Lørenskog	26	11	2	13	48	56	−8	35	
7	Eidsvold Turn	26	10	4	12	43	44	−1	34	
8	Gjøvik-Lyn	26	9	6	11	56	50	+6	33	
9	Lillestrøm 2	26	9	2	15	53	67	−14	29	
10	Molde 2	26	7	6	13	50	53	−3	27	
11	Mercantile	26	7	5	14	41	60	−19	26	
12	FF Lillehammer (R)	26	7	3	16	36	66	−30	24	Relegation to Third Division
13	Averøykameratene (R)	26	7	3	16	33	68	−35	24	Relegation to Third Division
14	Clausenengen (R)	26	2	2	22	32	90	−58	8	Relegation to Third Division

(P) Promoted; (R) Relegated

=== Group 3 ===
Pos	Team	Pld	W	D	L	GF	GA	GD	Pts	Promotion or relegation
1	Vard Haugesund (P)	26	21	1	4	91	27	+64	64	Promotion to First Division
2	Løv-Ham	26	18	2	6	69	31	+38	56	
3	Åsane	26	15	3	8	69	41	+28	48	
4	Hovding	26	14	3	9	55	33	+22	45	
5	Fyllingen	26	11	5	10	61	56	+5	38	
6	Brann 2	26	11	5	10	50	57	−7	38	
7	Ålgård	26	12	0	14	53	64	−11	36	
8	Viking 2	26	8	9	9	37	37	0	33	
9	Klepp	26	9	5	12	51	47	+4	32	
10	Vidar	26	10	1	15	29	71	−42	31	
11	Fana	26	9	3	14	41	51	−10	30	
12	Nest-Sotra (R)	26	8	5	13	40	48	−8	29	Relegation to Third Division
13	Skarbøvik (R)	26	8	1	17	39	68	−29	25	Relegation to Third Division
14	Langevåg (R)	26	5	3	18	18	72	−54	18	Relegation to Third Division

(P) Promoted; (R) Relegated

=== Group 4 ===
Pos	Team	Pld	W	D	L	GF	GA	GD	Pts	Promotion or relegation
1	Tromsdalen (P)	26	21	2	3	75	21	+54	65	Promotion to First Division
2	Strindheim	26	18	5	3	98	33	+65	59	
3	Levanger	26	15	5	6	83	36	+47	50	
4	Rosenborg 2	26	14	2	10	65	49	+16	44	
5	Mo	26	11	7	8	53	39	+14	40	
6	Lofoten	26	12	4	10	41	46	−5	40	
7	Nidelv	26	11	6	9	56	51	+5	39	
8	Vesterålen	26	11	2	13	58	60	−2	35	
9	Narvik	26	9	5	12	46	51	−5	32	
10	Skarp	26	9	4	13	57	62	−5	31	
11	Steinkjer	26	9	2	15	47	65	−18	29	
12	Hammerfest (R)	26	9	2	15	43	75	−32	29	Relegation to Third Division
13	Bossekop (R)	26	8	2	16	33	57	−24	26	Relegation to Third Division
14	Skjervøy (R)	26	1	0	25	20	130	−110	3	Relegation to Third Division

(P) Promoted; (R) Relegated

== Promotion playoff ==
=== Top goalscorers ===
Only players with more than 10 goals are listed.

==== Group 1 ====
- 13 goals: John Erling Kleppe, Pors
- 13 goals: Stian Nikodemussen, Tønsberg
- 13 goals: Lasse Jørn Fredriksen, Tollnes
- 11 goals: Ole Halvor Kolstad, Pors
- 11 goals: Christian Østli, Tønsberg

==== Group 2 ====
- 25 goals: Eirik Soltvedt, Ull/Kisa
- 24 goals: Lars Lafton, Nybergsund
- 20 goals: Vegard Svenskerud, Gjøvik-Lyn
- 19 goals: Mato Grubisic, Skjetten
- 13 goals: Einar Kalsæg, Eidsvold Turn
- 13 goals: Trygve Velten, Mercantile
- 10 goals: Andreas Walnum, Byåsen
- 10 goals: Mahmod Hejazi, Lillestrøm 2
- 10 goals: (Sweden) Paul Olausson, Kongsvinger

==== Group 3 ====
- 25 goals: Jarle Wee, Vard
- 19 goals: Steinar Lein, Vard
- 12 goals: Kjell Sture Jensen, Vard

==== Group 4 ====
- 33 goals: Bård Karlsen, Tromsdalen
- 30 goals: Vegard Alstad Sunde, Levanger
- 23 goals: Aslak Sokki, Skarp
- 20 goals: Kristian Selnæs, Strindheim
- 18 goals: Svein Martin Engvik, Nidelv
- 15 goals: Øystein Wiik, Nidelv
- 14 goals: Vegard Olsen, Strindheim
- 13 goals: Hans Arild Eliassen, Hammerfest
- 13 goals: Torstein Vassdal, Mo
- 13 goals: Fredrik Stoltz, Vesterålen
- 12 goals: Morten Giæver, Skarp
