= Arild Andersen (footballer) =

Norwegian footballer (born 1972)

Personal information
- Date of birth: 9 January 1972 (age 54)
- Place of birth: Bergen, Norway
- Height: 1.78 m (5 ft 10 in)
- Position: Defender

Youth career
- Sandviken

Senior career*
Years	Team	Apps	(Gls)
- Sandviken
1992–1996	Fyllingen		
1997–1998	Sogndal	43	(2)
1999–2007	Haugesund		
2008–2009	Haugar		
2010–2013	Avaldsnes		

Managerial career
- 2008–2009: Haugar (player-coach)
- 2010–2014: Avaldsnes (player-coach)
- Djerv 1919 (youth)
- * Club domestic league appearances and goals

Arild Andersen (born 9 January 1972) is a Norwegian football defender. He played in the Eliteserien for Fyllingen, Sogndal and Haugesund.

== Career ==
He started his career in IL Sandviken. Ahead of the 1992 season, he was brought to newly relegated 1. divisjon club Fyllingen. Whereas the local press had considered him to be an "anonymous" player in Sandviken, he stood out like "a sweeping, fresh whirlwind" in Fyllingen. Fyllingen became known for using Andersen's comparatively long throw-ins to create chances, though different managers employed the tactic to varying degrees. One of his throw-in assists came after only one minute in a league match in 1996, where he also scored twice. His highlights in Fyllingen were advancing to the semi-finals of the 1993 Norwegian Football Cup, as well as beating Molde 7–1 in 1994.

After the 1994 season, Sogndal entered talks with Andersen, with Sogndal leader Svein Bakke calling him "very promising". Åsane signalled their interest after the 1995 season. No move took place, whereas Fyllingen were relegated to the third tier in 1996. Andersen finally signed for Sogndal after the 1996 season, having also trained very briefly with Molde FK. A loan move was set up for one year.

=== Sogndal ===
In Sogndal, he rented a basement flat, as did teammate Eivind Karlsbakk in the same building. The first weeks were dented by homesickness; the Sogndal officials acknowledged that players needed to adapt when moving from cities to tiny Sogndalsfjøra (with a population less than 4,000). Andersen earned more, and did not need to work full-time in his old job as a plumber, which he had kept while playing for Fyllingen. In June 1997, Sogndal reprimanded him for public alcohol consumption the night before May Day.

Highlights in Sogndal include his first Eliteserien goal, which came in a 3–1 victory over Lillestrøm in June 1997. His second Eliteserien goal came in a 2–1 victory over Brann in July 1998. Andersen also scored in the 1997 cup, where Sogndal thrashed the reigning champions Tromsø 5–0.

As the 1998 season was nearing its end, Sogndal negotiated a new two-year contract with Andersen. In September, he accepted the terms orally, but the next day he received a counter-offer from FK Haugesund and signed for that club instead, letting Sogndal's chairman know by telephone. The manager and chairman called his decision "despicable" and added that "one almost feels stabbed in the back". They stated that Andersen was immediately expelled from Sogndal's first team, and would train with the B team or even the C team. They also threatened to withhold the paycheck for October, anticipating the expiry of his contract on 31 October. Hence, his last Sogndal match came the day before he revealed his signing for Haugesund. Andersen later stated that he telephoned secretly with Haugesunds Avis in his bedroom while the Sogndal manager was visiting his home. He explained that the terms in Sogndal would entail a 2,000 kr monthly pay decrease, which was "a slap in the face". The 1998 Eliteserien ended with Sogndal being relegated.

=== Playing position ===
Andersen was used in a number of playing positions. He started out as a left winger, and his favourite player was David Ginola (despite Andersen supporting Manchester United). In March 1998 it was reported that Sogndal used the pre-season to convert Andersen to left back. On rarer occasions he was used in a free role in central midfield or as an anchor. In late 2000, Haugesund moved him back up from left back to left winger. Haugesunds Avis considered him their best outfield player in his comeback in that position. Andersen stated that "I don't mind where I play, as long as it's on the left side".

=== FK Haugesund ===
Haugesund won the 1999 Norwegian First Division, but ended last in the 2000 Eliteserien and were relegated again. Andersen became a key player in trying to win re-promotion. Among his strengths were crosses and long throw-ins, as well as his experience in general and not missing any matches due to injuries. In July 2001, he prolonged his FKH contract with two years. By late October 2001, he had recorded 5 goals and 13 assists, being one of Haugesund's main assets in attack. After the 2001 season was done, however, and Haugesund once again failed to win promotion to Eliteserien, the financial situation was dire. Andersen feared that FKH would terminate players, and as a consequence, spend the 2002 1. divisjon battling against relegation to the third tier. Andersen was spared from a pay cut for the time being.

In the winter of 2002, Andersen was approached by Vålerenga regarding a possible move to that club. The prospect was "tempting", considering Haugesund's relegation and pay cuts. In the summer, Haugesund were contacted by SK Brann, who were interested in acquiring Andersen as an alternative on left back. Andersen expressed keen interest to join the largest club in Bergen, and stated that such a move would be "fantastic". Haugesund stated that Andersen was for sale, given "the right price". After a short deliberation, Brann decided that Andersen was too expensive, having recently spent transfer money on Alonso Solis and Nkosinathi Nhleko.

Andersen entered his last contract year with Haugesund in 2003. At the time, he was the only Haugesund player with as much as five seasons in a row. Having sat on the bench throughout the 2007 Norwegian Football Cup final, Andersen finally retired after the 2007 season, and would work in the club with marketing, together with teammate and fellow retiree Jostein Grindhaug. Andersen and Grindhaug were number one and two on the list of most capped players for FK Haugesund.

As the winter of 2007–08 approached, Andersen decided to continue in the lower tiers, first as player-coach of SK Haugar. Ahead of the 2010 season he took over Avaldsnes IL. His tenure started with relegation from the 2010 Norwegian Third Division. Aged 40, Andersen still played in central defense. He left Avaldsnes in March 2014, weeks before the start of a new season.

Andersen later coached Djerv 1919's U16 team. His son Eirik Viland Andersen eventually broke into Djerv 1919's senior team. After leaving full-time football, Arild Andersen worked with drug addict care in Kirkens Bymisjon.
