= Alexander Ødegaard =

Norwegian footballer (born 1980)

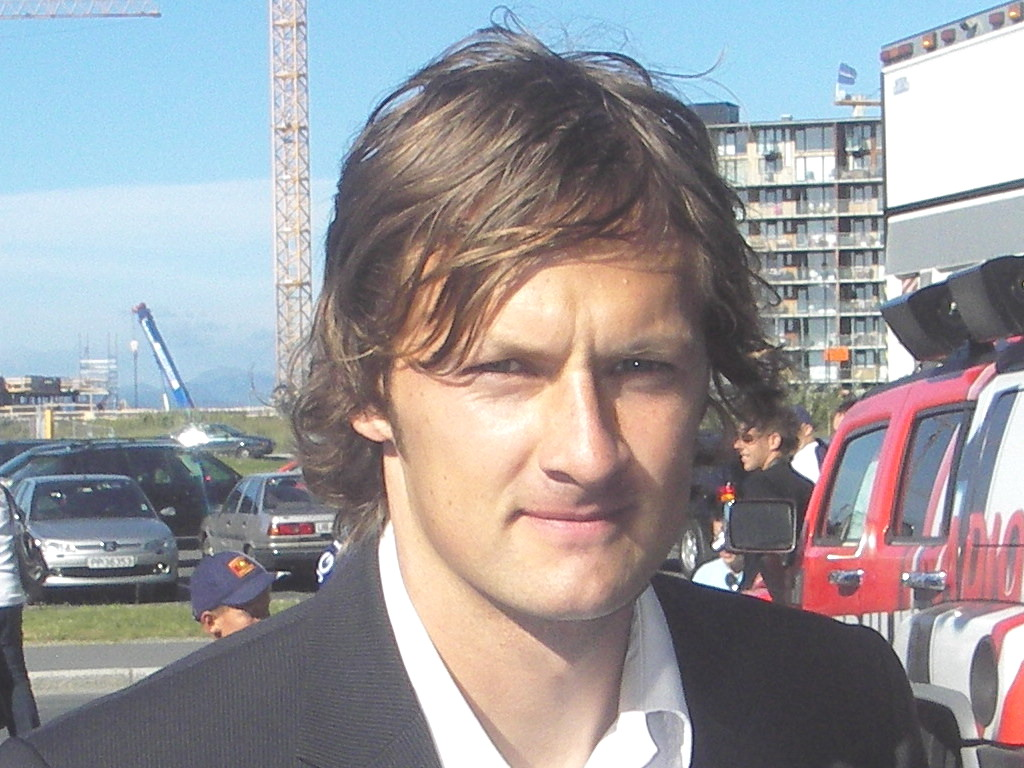
- Ødegaard in June 2007

Personal information
- Full name: Alexander Ødegaard
- Date of birth: 13 September 1980 (age 46)
- Place of birth: Voss Municipality, Hordaland, Norway
- Height: 1.80 m (5 ft 11 in)
- Positions: Winger; striker

Youth career
- 199?–1999: Førde

Senior career*
Years	Team	Apps	(Gls)
1999–2004	Sogndal	125	(46)
2005	Rosenborg	17	(4)
2006–2010	Viking	118	(16)
2011–2012	Metz	13	(1)
2012–2015	Førde	75	(33)

International career
1997	Norway U17	4	(2)
1998	Norway U18	6	(5)
1999	Norway U19	2	(0)
1999	Norway U20	1	(0)
2001	Norway U21	2	(0)
2004	Norway	4	(1)
- * Club domestic league appearances and goals

Alexander Ødegaard (born 13 September 1980) is a Norwegian former footballer. He played four times for the Norwegian national team, scoring one goal, and has played professionally for Sogndal, Rosenborg, Viking and French club Metz.

== Career ==
Ødegaard started his career with Førde IL. He left Førde and joined Sogndal IL in January 2001. Ødegaard was one of the 1980 generation players to break into the first team of Sogndal. After a successful 2004 season where he scored 15 league goals for Sogndal, and made his international debut for Norway, his services were wanted by Brann and Rosenborg. He chose the 13-in-a-row league champions Rosenborg, but his first season was a disappointment, as Rosenborg failed to win the title. After the season, he was sold to Viking in a deal worth €875,000.

On 24 January 2011, he signed a two-and-a-half-year deal with French side Metz in Ligue 2. He played for Metz until June 2012.

In August 2012, Ødegaard returned to Norway, where he signed for his youth club – the Third Division side Førde.

== Career statistics ==
Season	Club	League			Cup		Other (Note: Includes 2000 playoff, 2005–06 UEFA Champions League (6 apps, 1 goal), Royal League (6 apps, 1 goal) and 2008–09 UEFA Cup)		Total	
Season	Club	Division	Apps	Goals	Apps	Goals	Apps	Goals	Apps	Goals
1999	Førde	2. divisjon			1	0	–		1	0
Førde total					1	0	–		1	0
1999	Sogndal	1. Divisjon	6	3	0	0	–		6	3
2000	Sogndal	1. Divisjon	24	10	3	1	2	0	29	11
2001	Sogndal	Tippeligaen	24	8	4	2	–		28	10
2002	Sogndal	Tippeligaen	21	3	2	0	–		23	3
2003	Sogndal	Tippeligaen	25	7	4	6	–		29	13
2004	Sogndal	Tippeligaen	25	15	3	0	–		28	15
Sogndal total			125	46	16	9	2	0	143	55
2005	Rosenborg	Tippeligaen	17	4	4	4	12	2	33	10
Rosenborg total			17	4	4	4	12	2	33	10
2006	Viking	Tippeligaen	23	3	4	3	–		27	6
2007	Viking	Tippeligaen	21	5	4	3	–		25	8
2008	Viking	Tippeligaen	24	5	1	1	4	0	29	6
2009	Viking	Tippeligaen	25	1	3	0	–		28	1
2010	Viking	Tippeligaen	25	2	4	0	–		29	2
Viking total			118	16	16	7	4	0	138	23
2010–11	Metz	Ligue 2	5	1	1	0	0	0	6	1
2011–12	Metz	Ligue 2	8	0	0	0	0	0	8	0
Metz total			13	1	1	0	0	0	14	1
2012	Førde	3. divisjon	11	11	0	0	–		11	11
2013	Førde	2. divisjon	24	11	0	0	–		24	11
2014	Førde	2. divisjon	23	7	1	0	–		24	7
2015	Førde	2. divisjon	17	4	1	0	–		18	4
Førde total			75	33	2	0	—		77	33
Career Total			348	100	40	20	18	2	406	122

=== International goals ===
#	Date	Venue	Opponent	Score	Result	Competition
1	13 October 2004	Ullevaal Stadion, Oslo, Norway	Slovenia	3–0	3–0	World Cup 2006 Qualifier
