= Bjørn Strøm =

Norwegian footballer (born 1982)

Personal information
- Full name: Bjørn Strøm
- Date of birth: 11 December 1982 (age 43)
- Place of birth: Svolvær, Norway
- Position: Striker

Senior career*
Years	Team	Apps	(Gls)
- Lofoten
- Tromsø
2004	Tromsdalen	27	(4)
2005	Tromsø	1	
2006	Tromsdalen	29	(4)
2007–2009	FK Haugesund	69	(3)
2009–2013	Tromsdalen	96	(21)
- * Club domestic league appearances and goals as of 10 August 2014

Bjørn Strøm (born 11 December 1982 in Svolvær, Lofoten) is a Norwegian former football striker,.

His former clubs are FK Lofoten, Tromsø IL, Tromsdalen UIL, Tromsø IL (second time), FK Haugesund and Tromsdalen UIL (second time). He played one game in the Norwegian Premier League, in July 2005, and played for Haugesund in the 2007 Norwegian Cup final.

== Career statistics ==
As of 11 July 2013

Season	Club	Division	League		Cup		Total	
Season	Club	Division	Apps	Goals	Apps	Goals	Apps	Goals
2004	Tromsdalen	Adeccoligaen	27	4	0	0	27	4
2005	Tromsø	Tippeligaen	1	0	0	0	1	0
2006	Tromsdalen	Adeccoligaen	29	4	0	0	29	4
2007	Haugesund	Adeccoligaen	30	2	6	0	36	2
2008	Haugesund	Adeccoligaen	25	0	1	0	26	0
2009	Haugesund	Adeccoligaen	14	0	1	0	15	0
2009	Tromsdalen	Adeccoligaen	13	1	0	0	13	1
2010	Tromsdalen	Adeccoligaen	17	2	2	0	19	2
2011	Tromsdalen	2. divisjon	26	12	1	1	27	13
2012	Tromsdalen	Adeccoligaen	26	2	3	0	29	2
2013	Tromsdalen	2. divisjon	14	4	1	0	15	4
Career Total			222	31	15	1	237	32
