= Vegar =

Vegar is both a surname and a masculine Norwegian given name. It may refer to:

Surname:

- José Luis Vegar (born 1975), Spanish footballer
- Tino Vegar (born 1967), Croatian water polo player

Given name:

- Vegar Barlie (born 1972), Norwegian ice hockey player
- Vegar Eggen Hedenstad (born 1991), Norwegian footballer
- Vegar Gjermundstad (born 1990), Norwegian footballer
- Vegar Landro (born 1983), Norwegian footballer
- Bård Vegar Solhjell (born 1971), Norwegian politician

== See also ==
- Vegår, lake in Norway
- Vegard
