= 2001 Norwegian First Division =

1. divisjon
- Season: 2001
- Dates: 21 April – 28 October
- Champions: Vålerenga
- Promoted: Vålerenga; Start
- Relegated: Mandalskameratene; Kongsvinger; Kjelsås; Byåsen
- Matches: 240
- Goals: 813 (3.39 per match)
- Top goalscorer: Bala Garba; Marino Rahmberg (18 goals)

The 2001 1. divisjon, Norway's second-tier football league, began on 21 April 2001 and ended on 28 October 2001. The league was contested by 16 teams, and the top two teams won promotion to Tippeligaen, while the third place team played a promotion-playoff against the 12th-placed team in Tippeligaen to win promotion. The bottom four teams were relegated to the 2. divisjon.

== Team changes from 2000 ==
2000 1. divisjon champions FK Lyn and runners-up Strømsgodset were promoted to the 2001 Tippeligaen. They were replaced by Start and Haugesund, who finished 13th and 14th respectively in the 2000 Tippeligaen season.

Due to the enlargement from 14 to 16 teams in 2001, only two teams, Strindheim and Eik-Tønsberg, were relegated to the 2001 2. divisjon following the 2000 season. They were replaced by 2000 2. divisjon play-off winners Mandalskameratene, Ørn-Horten, Hødd and Aalesund. Mandalskameratene made their first appearance at the second tier since 1952–53.

One further spots were available through relegation/promotion play-offs. Sogndal successfully promoted to Tippeligaen by beating Tippeligaen side Vålerenga on away goals (3–3 on aggregate) in the Tippeligaen play-off, sending the team from Oslo to the second tier of Norwegian football.

== Season summary ==
Vålerenga and Start won promotion to Tippeligaen, after only one season in the First Division, while Ham-Kam lost the promotion-playoff against Bryne. Mandalskameratene, Kongsvinger, Kjelsås and Byåsen were relegated to the 2. divisjon.

In the decisive match of the season, Ørn-Horten scored twice in the stoppage time in the match against Vålerenga. Ørn-Horten's goalkeeper Helge Fjeld scored the winning goal five minutes into stoppage time, and kept Ørn-Horten clear of relegation, at the expense of Mandalskameratene.

Bala Garba and Marino Rahmberg became top goalscorers with 18 goals each.

== League table ==
Pos	Team	Pld	W	D	L	GF	GA	GD	Pts	Promotion or relegation
1	Vålerenga (Note: Vålerenga was deducted 3 points due to use of ineligible players.) (C, P)	30	19	8	3	71	29	+42	62	Promotion to Tippeligaen
2	Start (P)	30	18	8	4	59	33	+26	62	Promotion to Tippeligaen
3	HamKam	30	18	6	6	59	38	+21	60	Qualification for the promotion play-offs
4	Haugesund	30	17	5	8	76	44	+32	56	
5	Raufoss	30	15	5	10	61	43	+18	50	
6	Aalesund	30	13	8	9	65	51	+14	47	
7	Sandefjord	30	13	5	12	59	54	+5	44	
8	Skeid	30	12	5	13	50	41	+9	41	
9	L/F Hønefoss (Note: L/F Hønefoss changed its name to Hønefoss BK after the 2001 season.)	30	10	10	10	45	54	−9	40	
10	Tromsdalen	30	10	9	11	40	56	−16	39	
11	Hødd	30	9	8	13	50	51	−1	35	
12	Ørn-Horten	30	10	4	16	41	72	−31	34	
13	Mandalskameratene (R)	30	9	5	16	49	62	−13	32	Relegation to Second Division
14	Kongsvinger (R)	30	8	5	17	33	57	−24	29	Relegation to Second Division
15	Kjelsås (R)	30	6	6	18	26	50	−24	24	Relegation to Second Division
16	Byåsen (R)	30	3	3	24	29	78	−49	12	Relegation to Second Division

Source: nifs.no
Rules for classification: 1) points; 2) goal difference; 3) number of goals scored.
(C) Champions; (P) Promoted; (R) Relegated

== Results ==
Home \ Away	AAL	BYÅ	HAM	FKH	ILH	KJE	KIL	LFH	MAN	RIL	SAN	SKD	IKS	TUIL	VÅL	ØRN
Aalesund	—	2–2	2–4	7–0	2–1	2–1	3–1	1–1	0–1	0–1	4–2	2–0	1–1	4–1	2–2	4–0
Byåsen	1–2	—	0–2	2–8	0–2	0–1	1–4	3–1	1–0	1–3	4–5	1–0	0–1	0–1	1–7	1–2
HamKam	3–0	1–0	—	0–1	2–1	1–1	3–1	3–1	4–0	2–0	2–0	2–1	1–1	0–0	3–2	4–0
Haugesund	5–3	5–1	4–2	—	2–3	2–1	1–0	2–2	4–0	2–0	5–1	1–1	2–0	9–1	1–1	7–0
Hødd	1–2	2–0	2–2	1–1	—	0–1	7–0	0–2	4–1	1–1	3–2	1–2	3–1	2–2	0–0	2–1
Kjelsås	1–3	1–1	1–4	1–2	1–1	—	1–0	0–1	2–0	2–1	1–1	1–2	0–2	1–0	0–1	1–2
Kongsvinger	2–2	3–1	0–2	0–2	2–1	3–0	—	0–1	0–1	1–4	0–1	2–0	2–2	0–3	1–1	3–0
L/F Hønefoss	2–1	3–1	0–1	3–2	1–1	3–1	3–1	—	5–3	3–2	1–3	1–1	0–0	1–1	0–2	0–1
Mandalskameratene	6–3	2–1	4–1	1–3	2–2	0–0	0–1	6–0	—	1–2	2–1	0–4	0–2	4–0	2–2	5–0
Raufoss	3–1	2–0	2–3	1–0	5–2	4–2	0–0	1–1	5–0	—	4–2	2–0	2–5	6–1	1–2	0–1
Sandefjord	3–3	3–0	5–2	1–1	1–4	2–0	1–0	1–0	3–1	4–1	—	2–4	0–1	0–0	2–4	6–0
Skeid	0–0	5–2	4–1	3–0	3–2	1–0	3–3	3–1	1–1	0–2	1–2	—	0–1	2–3	1–2	0–1
Start	2–3	2–2	3–1	3–2	2–1	4–0	4–1	1–1	3–2	1–0	2–1	0–3	—	1–1	0–0	4–0
Tromsdalen	1–1	2–0	1–1	1–2	2–0	1–0	3–0	2–2	4–1	2–2	1–2	3–2	1–4	—	1–2	0–2
Vålerenga	2–1	4–1	1–1	3–0	3–0	2–0	5–0	7–2	3–2	0–0	1–0	1–0	1–2	5–0	—	3–2
Ørn-Horten	1–4	2–1	0–1	1–0	5–0	4–4	1–2	3–3	1–1	3–4	2–2	1–3	2–4	0–1	3–2	—

Source: NIFS (in Norwegian)
Legend: Blue = home team win; Yellow = draw; Red = away team win.

== Statistics ==
=== Top goalscorers ===
Rank	Scorer	Club	Goals
1	(Nigeria) Bala Garba	Haugesund	18
1	(Sweden) Marino Rahmberg	Raufoss	18
3	(Nigeria) Mohammed Idris	Ørn-Horten	16
4	(Norway) Tom Helge Jacobsen	Sandefjord	14
5	(Sweden) Andreas Ottosson	Start	13
