= 1999 Norwegian Second Division =

Norwegian football league season

The 1999 2. divisjon was the third highest football league for men in Norway.

22 games were played in 8 groups, with 3 points given for wins and 1 for draws. Hamarkameratene, Sandefjord, Strindheim and Tromsdalen were promoted to the First Division through playoffs against the other 4 group winners. Number twelve, thirteen and fourteen were relegated to the 3. divisjon. The winning teams from each of the 19 groups in the 3. divisjon, and some number-two teams, were promoted to the 2. divisjon.

== League tables ==
=== Group 1 ===
| Pos | Team | Pld | W | D | L | GF | GA | GD | Pts | Promotion or relegation |
|---|---|---|---|---|---|---|---|---|---|---|
| 1 | Hamarkameratene (P) | 22 | 17 | 2 | 3 | 61 | 17 | +44 | 53 | Promotion to First Division |
| 2 | Faaberg | 22 | 14 | 4 | 4 | 48 | 22 | +26 | 46 | |
| 3 | Elverum | 22 | 11 | 6 | 5 | 47 | 33 | +14 | 39 | |
| 4 | Grei | 22 | 11 | 3 | 8 | 41 | 28 | +13 | 36 | |
| 5 | Lillestrøm 2 | 22 | 11 | 3 | 8 | 51 | 48 | +3 | 36 | |
| 6 | Årvoll | 22 | 8 | 8 | 6 | 48 | 43 | +5 | 32 | |
| 7 | Lyn 2 | 22 | 9 | 5 | 8 | 48 | 46 | +2 | 32 | |
| 8 | Eidsvold Turn | 22 | 8 | 3 | 11 | 42 | 47 | −5 | 27 | |
| 9 | Ski | 22 | 6 | 5 | 11 | 29 | 44 | −15 | 23 | |
| 10 | Nybergsund (R) | 22 | 5 | 7 | 10 | 31 | 37 | −6 | 22 | Relegation to Third Division |
| 11 | Trøgstad/Båstad (R) | 22 | 4 | 3 | 15 | 25 | 69 | −44 | 15 | Relegation to Third Division |
| 12 | Tynset (R) | 22 | 2 | 3 | 17 | 21 | 58 | −37 | 9 | Relegation to Third Division |

(P) Promoted; (R) Relegated

=== Group 2 ===
| Pos | Team | Pld | W | D | L | GF | GA | GD | Pts | Relegation |
|---|---|---|---|---|---|---|---|---|---|---|
| 1 | Asker | 22 | 14 | 4 | 4 | 47 | 21 | +26 | 46 | |
| 2 | Ørn-Horten | 22 | 14 | 3 | 5 | 56 | 26 | +30 | 45 | |
| 3 | Kvik Halden | 22 | 13 | 4 | 5 | 53 | 35 | +18 | 43 | |
| 4 | Vålerenga 2 | 22 | 12 | 2 | 8 | 45 | 34 | +11 | 38 | |
| 5 | Sarpsborg | 22 | 10 | 4 | 8 | 43 | 32 | +11 | 34 | |
| 6 | Lørenskog | 22 | 10 | 4 | 8 | 42 | 35 | +7 | 34 | |
| 7 | Gjøvik-Lyn | 22 | 9 | 7 | 6 | 26 | 24 | +2 | 34 | |
| 8 | Fredrikstad | 22 | 8 | 4 | 10 | 27 | 28 | −1 | 28 | |
| 9 | Drøbak/Frogn | 22 | 6 | 5 | 11 | 28 | 47 | −19 | 23 | |
| 10 | Runar (R) | 22 | 6 | 2 | 14 | 33 | 50 | −17 | 20 | Relegation to Third Division |
| 11 | Østsiden (R) | 22 | 5 | 1 | 16 | 26 | 62 | −36 | 16 | Relegation to Third Division |
| 12 | Abildsø (R) | 22 | 4 | 2 | 16 | 25 | 57 | −32 | 14 | Relegation to Third Division |

(R) Relegated

=== Group 3 ===
| Pos | Team | Pld | W | D | L | GF | GA | GD | Pts | Promotion or relegation |
|---|---|---|---|---|---|---|---|---|---|---|
| 1 | Sandefjord (P) | 22 | 13 | 9 | 0 | 59 | 21 | +38 | 48 | Promotion to First Division |
| 2 | Tollnes | 22 | 13 | 4 | 5 | 55 | 28 | +27 | 43 | |
| 3 | Bærum | 22 | 10 | 8 | 4 | 43 | 27 | +16 | 38 | |
| 4 | Pors Grenland | 22 | 10 | 2 | 10 | 43 | 34 | +9 | 32 | |
| 5 | Ullern | 22 | 8 | 7 | 7 | 39 | 39 | 0 | 31 | |
| 6 | Skarphedin | 22 | 9 | 3 | 10 | 41 | 37 | +4 | 30 | |
| 7 | Stabæk 2 | 22 | 8 | 5 | 9 | 42 | 42 | 0 | 29 | |
| 8 | Sprint-Jeløy | 22 | 7 | 5 | 10 | 36 | 46 | −10 | 26 | |
| 9 | Manglerud Star | 22 | 8 | 2 | 12 | 41 | 56 | −15 | 26 | |
| 10 | Drafn (R) | 22 | 7 | 4 | 11 | 31 | 48 | −17 | 25 | Relegation to Third Division |
| 11 | Jevnaker (R) | 22 | 6 | 4 | 12 | 28 | 50 | −22 | 22 | Relegation to Third Division |
| 12 | Råde (R) | 22 | 6 | 1 | 15 | 35 | 65 | −30 | 19 | Relegation to Third Division |

(P) Promoted; (R) Relegated

=== Group 4 ===
| Pos | Team | Pld | W | D | L | GF | GA | GD | Pts | Relegation |
|---|---|---|---|---|---|---|---|---|---|---|
| 1 | Vidar | 22 | 13 | 6 | 3 | 51 | 26 | +25 | 45 | |
| 2 | Mandalskameratene | 22 | 13 | 4 | 5 | 53 | 35 | +18 | 43 | |
| 3 | Start 2 | 22 | 10 | 3 | 9 | 45 | 41 | +4 | 33 | |
| 4 | Flekkefjord | 22 | 9 | 6 | 7 | 39 | 42 | −3 | 33 | |
| 5 | Viking 2 | 22 | 8 | 7 | 7 | 35 | 29 | +6 | 31 | |
| 6 | Sandnes | 22 | 9 | 3 | 10 | 42 | 38 | +4 | 30 | |
| 7 | Ullensaker/Kisa | 22 | 8 | 5 | 9 | 36 | 38 | −2 | 29 | |
| 8 | Randaberg | 22 | 7 | 8 | 7 | 35 | 41 | −6 | 29 | |
| 9 | Vard Haugesund | 22 | 7 | 7 | 8 | 42 | 31 | +11 | 28 | |
| 10 | Haugesund 2 (R) | 22 | 8 | 3 | 11 | 46 | 48 | −2 | 27 | Relegation to Third Division |
| 11 | Sola (R) | 22 | 6 | 5 | 11 | 35 | 56 | −21 | 23 | Relegation to Third Division |
| 12 | Ålgård (R) | 22 | 2 | 7 | 13 | 27 | 61 | −34 | 13 | Relegation to Third Division |

(R) Relegated

=== Group 5 ===
| Pos | Team | Pld | W | D | L | GF | GA | GD | Pts | Relegation |
|---|---|---|---|---|---|---|---|---|---|---|
| 1 | Fyllingen | 22 | 17 | 4 | 1 | 76 | 19 | +57 | 55 | |
| 2 | Åsane | 22 | 16 | 3 | 3 | 66 | 36 | +30 | 51 | |
| 3 | Førde | 22 | 10 | 5 | 7 | 50 | 41 | +9 | 35 | |
| 4 | Fana | 22 | 10 | 4 | 8 | 43 | 31 | +12 | 34 | |
| 5 | Os | 22 | 9 | 7 | 6 | 34 | 24 | +10 | 34 | |
| 6 | Stord | 22 | 7 | 6 | 9 | 43 | 40 | +3 | 27 | |
| 7 | Tornado | 22 | 7 | 6 | 9 | 35 | 49 | −14 | 27 | |
| 8 | Ny-Krohnborg | 22 | 5 | 8 | 9 | 39 | 43 | −4 | 23 | |
| 9 | Florø | 22 | 6 | 5 | 11 | 24 | 58 | −34 | 23 | |
| 10 | Brann 2 (R) | 22 | 6 | 4 | 12 | 46 | 56 | −10 | 22 | Relegation to Third Division |
| 11 | Radøy (R) | 22 | 4 | 5 | 13 | 40 | 65 | −25 | 17 | Relegation to Third Division |
| 12 | Sogndal 2 (R) | 22 | 4 | 5 | 13 | 33 | 67 | −34 | 17 | Relegation to Third Division |

(R) Relegated

=== Group 6 ===
| Pos | Team | Pld | W | D | L | GF | GA | GD | Pts | Relegation |
|---|---|---|---|---|---|---|---|---|---|---|
| 1 | Aalesund | 22 | 17 | 5 | 0 | 83 | 17 | +66 | 56 | |
| 2 | Skarbøvik | 22 | 15 | 2 | 5 | 52 | 25 | +27 | 47 | |
| 3 | Kolstad | 22 | 11 | 5 | 6 | 44 | 39 | +5 | 38 | |
| 4 | Orkla | 22 | 11 | 3 | 8 | 46 | 35 | +11 | 36 | |
| 5 | Træff | 22 | 11 | 2 | 9 | 54 | 41 | +13 | 35 | |
| 6 | Sunndal | 22 | 10 | 3 | 9 | 42 | 45 | −3 | 33 | |
| 7 | Molde 2 | 22 | 9 | 3 | 10 | 43 | 37 | +6 | 30 | |
| 8 | Ranheim | 22 | 8 | 5 | 9 | 41 | 37 | +4 | 29 | |
| 9 | Ørsta | 22 | 6 | 5 | 11 | 36 | 52 | −16 | 23 | |
| 10 | Averøykameratene (R) | 22 | 5 | 4 | 13 | 27 | 76 | −49 | 19 | Relegation to Third Division |
| 11 | Volda (R) | 22 | 4 | 4 | 14 | 25 | 51 | −26 | 16 | Relegation to Third Division |
| 12 | Nardo (R) | 22 | 3 | 3 | 16 | 22 | 60 | −38 | 12 | Relegation to Third Division |

(R) Relegated

=== Group 7 ===
| Pos | Team | Pld | W | D | L | GF | GA | GD | Pts | Promotion or relegation |
|---|---|---|---|---|---|---|---|---|---|---|
| 1 | Strindheim (P) | 22 | 18 | 1 | 3 | 80 | 34 | +46 | 55 | Promotion to First Division |
| 2 | Verdal | 22 | 15 | 0 | 7 | 54 | 43 | +11 | 45 | |
| 3 | Stålkameratene | 22 | 13 | 5 | 4 | 68 | 31 | +37 | 44 | |
| 4 | Narvik | 22 | 11 | 2 | 9 | 51 | 48 | +3 | 35 | |
| 5 | Bodø/Glimt 2 | 22 | 10 | 2 | 10 | 61 | 57 | +4 | 32 | |
| 6 | Steinkjer | 22 | 9 | 5 | 8 | 47 | 43 | +4 | 32 | |
| 7 | Rosenborg 2 | 22 | 8 | 6 | 8 | 50 | 50 | 0 | 30 | |
| 8 | Mo | 22 | 7 | 6 | 9 | 49 | 49 | 0 | 27 | |
| 9 | Mosjøen | 22 | 8 | 3 | 11 | 46 | 49 | −3 | 27 | |
| 10 | Gevir Bodø (R) | 22 | 9 | 0 | 13 | 40 | 53 | −13 | 27 | Relegation to Third Division |
| 11 | Brønnøysund (R) | 22 | 3 | 5 | 14 | 31 | 87 | −56 | 14 | Relegation to Third Division |
| 12 | Namsos (R) | 22 | 1 | 5 | 16 | 27 | 70 | −43 | 8 | Relegation to Third Division |

(P) Promoted; (R) Relegated

=== Group 8 ===
| Pos | Team | Pld | W | D | L | GF | GA | GD | Pts | Promotion or relegation |
|---|---|---|---|---|---|---|---|---|---|---|
| 1 | Tromsdalen (P) | 22 | 16 | 4 | 2 | 89 | 25 | +64 | 52 | Promotion to First Division |
| 2 | Alta | 22 | 15 | 3 | 4 | 88 | 33 | +55 | 48 | |
| 3 | Harstad | 22 | 14 | 4 | 4 | 63 | 26 | +37 | 46 | |
| 4 | Skarp | 22 | 11 | 2 | 9 | 56 | 60 | −4 | 35 | |
| 5 | Sortland | 22 | 10 | 4 | 8 | 49 | 57 | −8 | 34 | |
| 6 | Senja (Note: Senja was known as Silsand OIL until round six.) | 22 | 8 | 6 | 8 | 54 | 66 | −12 | 30 | |
| 7 | Finnsnes | 22 | 8 | 5 | 9 | 58 | 61 | −3 | 29 | |
| 8 | Skjervøy | 22 | 8 | 5 | 9 | 46 | 49 | −3 | 29 | |
| 9 | Lyngen/Karnes | 22 | 7 | 7 | 8 | 37 | 47 | −10 | 28 | |
| 10 | Nordreisa (R) | 22 | 5 | 3 | 14 | 43 | 68 | −25 | 18 | Relegation to Third Division |
| 11 | Hammerfest (R) | 22 | 4 | 4 | 14 | 40 | 60 | −20 | 16 | Relegation to Third Division |
| 12 | Kirkenes (R) | 22 | 1 | 3 | 18 | 20 | 91 | −71 | 6 | Relegation to Third Division |

(P) Promoted; (R) Relegated
