= Vegard =

Vegard is a Norwegian given name. It may refer to:

== Given name ==
- Vegard Aanestad (born 1987), Norwegian footballer
- Vegard Arnhoff (born 1977), Norwegian sailor
- Vegard Bergan (born 1995), Norwegian footballer
- Vegard Braaten (born 1987), Norwegian footballer
- Vegard Breen (born 1990), Norwegian cyclist
- Vegard Robinson Bugge (born 1989), Norwegian cyclist
- Vegard Bye (born 1951), Norwegian political scientist, writer, consultant and ex-politician
- Vegard Ellefsen (born 1950), Norwegian diplomat
- Vegard Erlien (born 1998), Norwegian footballer
- Vegard Forren (born 1988), Norwegian footballer
- Vegard Hansen (born 1969), Norwegian football coach
- Vegard Heggem (born 1975), Norwegian footballer
- Vegard Høidalen (born 1971), Norwegian beach volleyball player
- Vegard Berg Johansen (born 1973), Norwegian footballer
- Vegard Lysvoll (born 1989), Norwegian footballer
- Vegard Leikvoll Moberg (born 1991), Norwegian footballer
- Vegard Bjerkreim Nilsen (born 1993), Norwegian cross-country skier
- Vegard Opaas (born 1962), Norwegian ski jumper
- Vegard Røed (born 1975), Norwegian footballer
- Vegard Samdahl (born 1978), Norwegian handballer
- Vegard Sannes (born 1976), Norwegian footballer
- Vegard Skirbekk (born 1975), Norwegian economist and social scientist
- Vegard Skjerve (born 1988), Norwegian footballer
- Vegard Haukø Sklett (born 1986), Norwegian former ski jumper
- Vegard Skogheim (born 1966), Norwegian footballer and football coach
- Vegard Sletten (1907–1984), Norwegian journalist and newspaper editor
- Vegard Dragsund Sverd (born 1999), Norwegian para-athlete
- Vegard Thune (born 1951), Norwegian politician
- Vegard Tveitan (born 1975), Norwegian composer, multi-instrumentalist, and vocalist known as Ihsahn
- Vegard Ulvang (born 1963), Norwegian cross-country skier
- Vegard Wennesland (born 1983), Norwegian politician
- Vegard Ylvisåker (born 1979), part of the Norwegian comedy duo Ylvis

== Middle name ==
- Finn Vegard Nordhagen, Norwegian racing cyclist

== Surname ==
- Jon Grunde Vegard (born 1957), Norwegian diver
- Lars Vegard (1880–1963), Norwegian physicist, known for Vegard's law

== See also ==
- Vegar
