= Eirik Soltvedt =

Norwegian footballer (born 1979)

Personal information
- Full name: Eirik Tunheim Røhneng-Soltvedt
- Date of birth: 3 September 1979 (age 47)
- Height: 1.75 m (5 ft 9 in)
- Position: Striker

Youth career
- Randaberg
- 1995–1998: Viking

Senior career*
Years	Team	Apps	(Gls)
1999	Bryne	20	(0)
2000	Randaberg		
2000	Skeid		
2001	Ullern		
2002–2003	Ull/Kisa		
2004–2005	Lillestrøm	6	(0)
2005–2007	Notodden		
2007–2012	Ull/Kisa		
2013–2015	Eidsvold	33	(21)
2016	Hauerseter		

International career
1995	Norway U16	2	(1)
1996	Norway U17	1	(0)
- * Club domestic league appearances and goals

Eirik Soltvedt (born 3 September 1979) is a retired Norwegian footballer who played as a striker.

Hailing from Randaberg Municipality, he played youth football for Viking and represented Norway as a youth international. In 1994 he went on trial with AFC Ajax, followed by IFK Göteborg and Ipswich Town in 1995, Southampton in 1996 and a week-long trial with AC Milan Primavera in 1997.

He was a prolific goalscorer for Viking's youth and B teams, but was not given a senior contract and was subsequently picked up by Bryne. He first made his mark in an indoor tournament and was lauded as one of Bryne's best players of the pre-season. The rest of the season was partially marred by injury. After the 1999 season he was contacted by Sandnes FK, whereas Bryne did not want to retain him. He had a contract extending to 2000, but if he chose to stay it out he would have to play for the B team, and instead chose to move to Randaberg.

In mid-2000 he moved to Oslo and played successively for Skeid and Ullern. In 2002 he joined Ull/Kisa, and after he scored 25 goals in the 2003 2. divisjon he was picked up by neighbouring Eliteserien club Lillestrøm. Never a success, in mid-2005 he moved on to Notodden. Here, he scored on his debut.

In mid-2007 he returned to Ull/Kisa, and from 2013 he finished his career in lowly Eidsvold and Hauerseter.

== Personal life ==
As a young player he was nicknamed "Giggs".
