= Bala Garba =

Nigerian footballer and coach (born 1974)

Personal information
- Full name: Bala Ahmed Garba<
- Date of birth: 9 August 1974 (age 52)
- Place of birth: Lagos, Nigeria
- Height: 1.89 m (6 ft 2 in)
- Position: Forward

Senior career*
Years	Team	Apps	(Gls)
- NUB
- VIP
- El-Kanemi
1997	Udoji United		
1997–2003	Haugesund	137	(54)
2003	Sundsvall	26	(5)
2004–2006	Start	60	(16)
2007–2008	Notodden	36	(4)
2009–2011	Kopervik		
2011–2011	Nord		
2012–?	Haugaland Fotballklubb		

International career
199?–199?	Nigeria	7	(-)
- * Club domestic league appearances and goals

Bala Ahmed Garba (born 9 August 1974 in Lagos) is a Nigerian football coach and former player. A forward, he played for Haugesund from 1997 to 2002, scoring 61 goals, which is a club record. In the 2005 season he played for Start, winning silver medal in the Tippeliga with the club. In 2006, he played for Notodden Fotballklubb. Later he settled in Kopervik, where he has been coaching local clubs in addition to daytime work.

== Career statistics ==
As of 17 January 2015

Appearances and goals by club, season and competition
Season	Club	League			National cup		League cup		Europe		Total	
Season	Club	Division	Apps	Goals	Apps	Goals	Apps	Goals	Apps	Goals	Apps	Goals
Haugesund	1997	Tippeligaen	14	6	0	0	—		—		14	6
Haugesund	1998	Tippeligaen	21	6	0	0	—		—		21	6
Haugesund	1999	Norwegian First Division	26	11	3	2	—		—		29	13
Haugesund	2000	Tippeligaen	23	4	1	0	—		—		24	4
Haugesund	2001	Norwegian First Division	29	18	2	1	—		—		31	19
Haugesund	2002	Norwegian First Division	24	8	2	0	—		—		26	8
Sundsvall	2003	Allsvenskan	26	5	0	0	—		—		26	5
Start	2004	Norwegian First Division	29	14	1	0	—		—		30	14
Start	2005	Tippeligaen	16	2	1	0	—		—		17	2
Start	2006	Tippeligaen	14	0	0	0	—		—		14	0
Notodden	2007	Norwegian First Division	22	3	0	0	—		—		22	3
Notodden	2008	Norwegian First Division	11	0	0	0	—		—		11	0
Career total			255	77	10	3	0	0	0	0	265	80
