= Trond Nordseth =

Norwegian footballer (born 1974)

Personal information
- Full name: Trond Atle Nordseth
- Date of birth: 5 January 1974 (age 52)
- Positions: Striker; defender (Note: Nordseth played a defender later in his career.)

Youth career
- Sparbu

Senior career*
Years	Team	Apps	(Gls)
–1992	Sparbu		
1993–1997	Steinkjer		
1998	Byåsen		
1999–2001	Start	63	(13)
2002	Romerike		
2002–2004	Steinkjer		
2005–2006	Byåsen		
2007–2008	Levanger		

International career
1991	Norway u-17	4	(3)
- * Club domestic league appearances and goals

Trond Nordseth (born 5 January 1974) is a retired Norwegian football striker; late in his career defender.

He grew up in the club Sparbu and represented Norway as a youth international. Ahead of the 1993 season he was picked up by Steinkjer FK. Ahead of the 1997 season he was pronounced captain.

Ahead of the 1998 season he trialled with Rosenborg, Molde and Aalesund, but joined Byåsen. He scored 12 league goals, and was bought by Start where he managed the same feat in 1999. Start won promotion, and in the 2000 Eliteserien Nordseth played 23 games. He went on to Romerike in 2002, then Steinkjer in mid-2002, Byåsen again in 2005 and Levanger in 2007. In the spring of 2008 he started another season for Levanger, but then moved to Kristiansand to work in advertising and quit his career.
