= Marino Rahmberg =

Swedish footballer

Personal information
- Full name: Marino Lars-Richard Ramberg
- Date of birth: 7 August 1974 (age 52)
- Place of birth: Örebro, Sweden
- Height: 1.80 m (5 ft 11 in)
- Position: Forward

Youth career
- 1980–1993: BK Forward

Senior career*
| Years | Team | Apps | (Gls) |
| 1993–1995 | BK Forward | 67 | (12) |
| 1995–1996 | Lyngby FC | 6 | (1) |
| 1996–1997 | Degerfors IF | 41 | (14) |
| 1997 | → Derby County (loan) | 1 | (0) |
| 1998–1999 | AIK | 20 | (3) |
| 1999–2001 | Raufoss IL | 78 | (45) |
| 2002–2003 | IFK Göteborg | 7 | (0) |
| Total | | 220 | (75) |

International career
| 1997 | Sweden | 4 | (0) |
- * Club domestic league appearances and goals

Marino Lars-Richard Ramberg (born 7 August 1974) is a Swedish former professional footballer who played as a forward. Starting his career with BK Forward in 1993, he went on to represent Lyngby FC, Degerfors IF, Derby County, AIK, and Raufoss IL before retiring at IFK Göteborg in 2003. A full international in 1997, he won four caps for the Sweden national team.

== Club career ==
Rahmberg started his career at hometown club BK Forward, which were in the second tier and coached by Benny Lennartsson. In 1995, he joined Lyngby FC after his previous manager had moved to the Danish club. He played six times at the 1995-96 Danish Superliga campaign, scoring in his second match against Odense.

He returned to Sweden in 1996, joining Allsvenskan club Degerfors IF, located near his hometown Örebro. In first season at the club, he scored 13 goals and was the second best top scored of the 1996 Allsvenskan, only behind Andreas Andersson.

His performance was rewarded with a loan to Premier League side Derby County in January 1997, but he played only 8 minutes for the Rams in the Premier League as a second-half substitute in a 4-2 defeat to Leicester City on 22 February 1997. He had further appearances with the reserve side, including a match where a clearance from the field went right into the front window of his car in the parking lot, smashing it.

Rahmberg returned to Degerfors in the same year, but could not avoid the team's relegation from the Allsvenskan, having scored a single goal in the campaign and missing matches due to injury. In 1998, he signed for AIK where he won the 1998 Allsvenskan playing in 19 of the 26 matches, but scoring only 3 goals. Mainly a substitute in the following year, he won the 1998-99 Svenska Cupen and decided to leave to seek first-team football.

In 1999, he joined Raufoss IL in the Norwegian First Division. He was the 4th best top scorer in the 2000 Norwegian First Division and joint best top scorer in the 2001 championship. After 11 goals in 17 league matches in 2002, he returned to the top flight and back to Sweden with IFK Göteborg. He suffered a herniated disc early in the 2003 season after falling down after a challenge, failed to recover and decided to retire from professional football.

== International career ==
Rahmberg was called to the 1997 King's Cup in Thailand after being the second-best top scorer in the 1996 Allsvenskan. He played in all four matches of the tournament for Sweden, although one of the matches was not considered a FIFA A-international match.

== Playing style ==
He was remarked by former coach Benny Lennartsson as a player with great pace and running ability.

== Honours ==
AIK

- Allsvenskan: 1998
- Svenska Cupen: 1998–99

Sweden

- King's Cup: 1997

Individual

- Norwegian First Division Golden Boot (joint winner): 2001
