= Vegar Gjermundstad =

Norwegian footballer (born 1990)

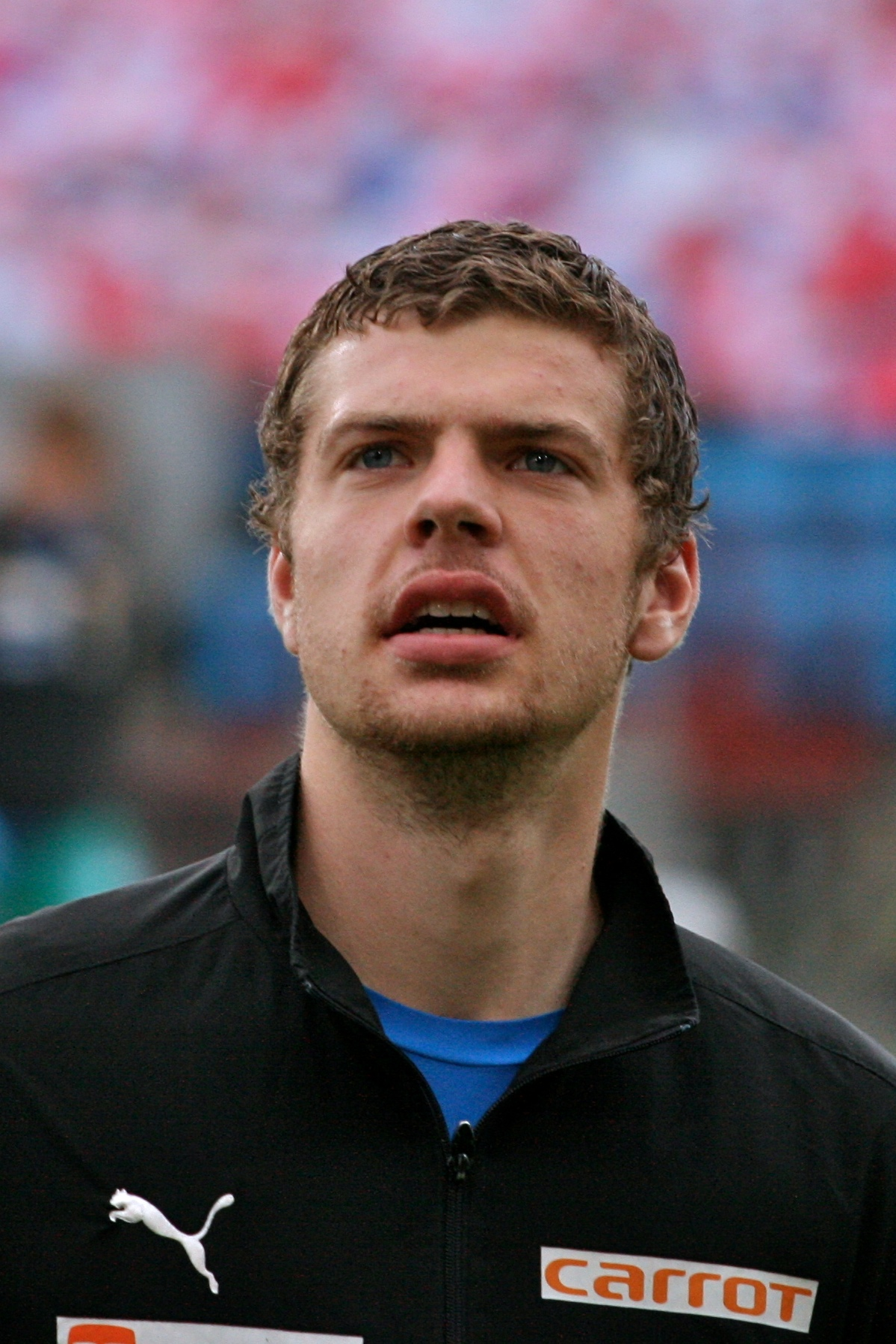

Personal information
- Full name: Vegar Heggenes Gjermundstad
- Date of birth: 14 March 1990 (age 36)
- Place of birth: Vadheim, Norway
- Height: 1.93 m (6 ft 4 in)
- Position: Defender

Team information
- Current team: Førde

Youth career
- Vadheim
- –2006: Høyang
- 2006–2008: Lyn

Senior career*
| Years | Team | Apps | (Gls) |
| 2008–2010 | Lyn | 27 | (1) |
| 2010–2011 | Sogndal | 19 | (0) |
| 2012 | Hønefoss | 4 | (0) |
| 2013–2016 | Førde | 72 | (2) |
| 2016–2018 | Florø | 82 | (3) |
| 2019– | Førde | 8 | (2) |
- * Club domestic league appearances and goals as of 23:33, 9 June 2019 (UTC)

Vegar Heggenes Gjermundstad (born 14 March 1990) is a Norwegian football defender who plays for Førde IL.

== Career ==
He hails from Vadheim. He started his career in Vadheim IL and IL Høyang, but moved in 2006 to attend the school Norsk Toppidrettsgymnas as well as to play for FC Lyn Oslo. In the summer of 2008 he signed for Lyn's senior team. He has two Norwegian Premier League games in 2009, making his debut on 19 April 2009 against Strømsgodset and starting his first game on 3 May 2009 against Stabæk Fotball. His 27th and last game came in May 2010. Following the bankruptcy of Lyn, he joined Sogndal IL in July 2010. Till then he has faced major setbacks as from playing for a club in top flight to fourth division.

== Career statistics ==
=== Club ===
As of 22 December 2024

| Club | Season | League | | | League Cup | | UEFA | | Total | |
| Club | Season | Division | Apps | Goals | Apps | Goals | Apps | Goals | Apps | Goals |
|---|---|---|---|---|---|---|---|---|---|---|
| Lyn FK | 2008 | Eliteserien | 0 | 0 | - | | - | | - | |
| Lyn FK | 2009 | Eliteserien | 17 | 0 | - | | - | | 17 | 0 |
| Total | | | 17 | 0 | - | | - | | 17 | 0 |
| Sogndal | 2010 | Adeccoligaen | 2 | 0 | - | | - | | 2 | 0 |
| Sogndal | 2011 | Adeccoligaen | 19 | 0 | 1 (Note: Appearance(s) in Norwegian Football Cup) | 0 | - | | 20 | 0 |
| Total | | | 21 | 0 | 1 | 0 | - | | 22 | 0 |
| Hønefoss | 2012 | Eliteserien | 4 | 0 | 0 | 0 | - | | 4 | 0 |
| Førde | 2013 | 2. divisjon | - | | 1 | 0 | - | | 1 | 0 |
| Førde | 2014 | 2. divisjon | - | | 1 | 0 | - | | 1 | 0 |
| Førde | 2015 | 2. divisjon | - | | 1 | 0 | - | | 1 | 0 |
| Total | | | - | | 3 | 0 | - | | 3 | 0 |
| Florø | 2016 | 2. divisjon | - | | 1 | 0 | - | | 1 | 0 |
| Florø | 2017 | OBOS-ligaen | 29 | 2 | 3 | 0 | - | | 32 | 2 |
| Florø | 2018 | OBOS-ligaen | 27 | 0 | 2 | 0 | - | | 29 | 0 |
| Florø | Total | | 56 | 2 | 5 | 0 | - | | 61 | 2 |
| Total | | | 56 | 2 | 6 | 0 | - | | 62 | 2 |
| Førde | 2023 | 3. divisjon | 9 | 0 | - | | - | | 9 | 0 |
| Førde | 2024 | 3. divisjon | 9 | 0 | - | | - | | 9 | 0 |
| Total | | | 18 | 0 | - | | - | | 18 | 0 |
| Career total | | | 116 | 2 | 10 | 0 | - | | 126 | 2 |
