= 1999 Norwegian First Division =

1. divisjon
- Season: 1999
- Dates: 17 April – 17 October
- Champions: Haugesund
- Promoted: Haugesund; Bryne; Start
- Relegated: Lofoten; Skjetten; Hødd; Clausenengen
- Matches: 182
- Goals: 550 (3.02 per match)
- Top goalscorer: Anders Blomquist (17 goals)

The 1999 1. divisjon, Norway's second-tier football league, began play on 17 April 1999 and ended on 17 October 1999. The league was contested by 14 teams, and the top two teams won promotion to Tippeligaen, while the third placed played a promotion-playoff against the 12th-placed team in Tippeligaen to win promotion. The bottom four teams were relegated to the 2. divisjon.

Haugesund and Bryne won direct promotion to Tippeligaen, while Start was promoted after having won 3–2 on aggregate against Strømsgodset in the promotion-playoff. Lofoten, Skjetten, Hødd and Clausenengen was relegated to the 2. divisjon.

== League table ==
Pos	Team	Pld	W	D	L	GF	GA	GD	Pts	Promotion or relegation
1	Haugesund (C, P)	26	16	4	6	61	32	+29	52	Promotion to Tippeligaen
2	Bryne (P)	26	14	7	5	43	33	+10	49	Promotion to Tippeligaen
3	Start (O, P)	26	13	8	5	42	31	+11	47	Qualification for the promotion play-offs
4	Lyn	26	11	9	6	54	30	+24	42	
5	Sogndal	26	12	6	8	38	32	+6	42	
6	Kjelsås	26	11	8	7	33	28	+5	41	
7	Eik-Tønsberg	26	10	7	9	39	39	0	37	
8	L/F Hønefoss	26	10	5	11	43	42	+1	35	
9	Raufoss	26	8	8	10	35	36	−1	32	
10	Byåsen (Note: Byåsen was deducted 3 points.)	26	9	6	11	37	32	+5	30	
11	Lofoten (R)	26	8	6	12	38	47	−9	30	Relegation to Second Division
12	Skjetten (R)	26	8	5	13	29	43	−14	29	Relegation to Second Division
13	Hødd (R)	26	5	6	15	34	51	−17	21	Relegation to Second Division
14	Clausenengen (R)	26	4	1	21	24	74	−50	13	Relegation to Second Division

Source: nifs.no
Rules for classification: 1) points; 2) goal difference; 3) number of goals scored.
(C) Champions; (O) Play-off winners; (P) Promoted; (R) Relegated

== Results ==
Home \ Away	BRY	BYÅ	CLA	EIK	FKH	ILH	KJE	LFH	LOF	LYN	RIL	SKJ	SIL	IKS
Bryne	—	1–0	2–0	4–1	0–0	2–1	2–2	3–0	4–3	1–0	3–2	1–0	3–0	3–3
Byåsen	0–0	—	6–1	1–2	2–0	1–0	1–2	6–1	1–1	0–1	1–1	2–1	0–1	0–0
Clausenengen	0–2	1–0	—	1–3	1–4	1–3	1–2	0–1	1–3	1–4	4–1	0–1	0–3	1–5
Eik-Tønsberg	2–0	1–1	5–1	—	2–3	3–2	1–2	1–1	1–1	0–0	4–1	0–0	1–0	1–0
Haugesund	0–0	3–3	6–0	2–0	—	4–0	1–0	0–2	5–2	4–3	5–1	4–1	0–1	4–0
Hødd	1–4	1–2	1–2	2–2	1–0	—	0–0	2–3	3–0	2–0	1–1	1–3	2–1	2–3
Kjelsås	4–1	2–1	3–2	0–2	3–0	1–0	—	0–3	0–1	1–1	1–1	1–1	1–2	1–2
L/F Hønefoss	1–2	3–4	4–2	3–4	0–3	1–1	0–1	—	3–0	3–0	0–0	1–2	0–0	4–1
Lofoten	3–1	1–2	1–2	2–1	1–3	4–2	0–0	0–3	—	1–1	1–1	5–0	2–1	1–1
Lyn	6–0	2–0	6–0	7–0	0–2	3–2	0–0	1–1	2–1	—	2–1	1–1	2–2	1–2
Raufoss	0–1	0–1	3–0	1–1	4–0	2–0	0–1	2–1	2–0	2–2	—	1–0	3–2	3–1
Skjetten	0–0	1–0	2–0	2–4	2–3	2–0	2–3	1–3	5–1	1–6	1–0	—	0–2	0–3
Sogndal	3–2	1–0	1–1	2–1	3–1	2–2	2–1	5–1	0–2	1–2	2–2	0–0	—	1–0
Start	1–1	4–2	2–1	0–0	2–0	2–2	1–1	1–0	2–1	1–1	1–0	1–0	3–0	—

Source: NIFS (in Norwegian)
Legend: Blue = home team win; Yellow = draw; Red = away team win.

== Top goalscorers ==
Rank	Player	Club	Goals
1	(Sweden) Anders Blomquist	Haugesund	17
2	(Norway) Kristian Bye-Andersen	Eik-Tønsberg	16
3	(Norway) Tommy Nilsen	Lyn	14
4	(Norway) Trond Nordseth	Start	12
5	(Norway) Geir Atle Undheim	Bryne	11
5	(Nigeria) Bala Garba	Haugesund	11
5	(Norway) Ole Petter Skonnord	Kjelsås	11
5	(Norway) Jarle Wee	Haugesund	11
9	(Sweden) Lars Berg	Raufoss	10
9	(Norway) Fredrik Horn	Lofoten	10
9	(Norway) Stein Berg Johansen	Lofoten	10
9	(Sweden) Mikael Edvardson	L/F Hønefoss	10
9	(Norway) Kjell Roar Kaasa	Lyn	10

== Promotion play-offs ==
Start (3rd in 1. divisjon) won the play-offs against Strømsgodset (12th in Tippeligaen) 3–2 on aggregate.

27 October 1999
18:00 CEST (UTC+2)

Start	2–2	Strømsgodset
Kloster 7' (pen.); Nordseth 62'	Report	Wæhler 45'; Lemsalu 84'

Kristiansand Stadion, Kristiansand
Attendance: 5,004
Referee: Rune Pedersen

31 October 1999
18:00 CET (UTC+1)

Strømsgodset	0–1	Start
	Report	Leonardsen 90+2'

Marienlyst Stadion, Drammen
Attendance: 5,979
Referee: Jonny Ditlefsen

Start won 3–2 on aggregate and was promoted to Tippeligaen. Strømsgodset was relegated to 1. divisjon.

== See also ==
- 1999 Tippeligaen
- 1999 2. divisjon
- 1999 3. divisjon
