= Per Ivar Staberg =

Norwegian footballer and referee (born 1969)

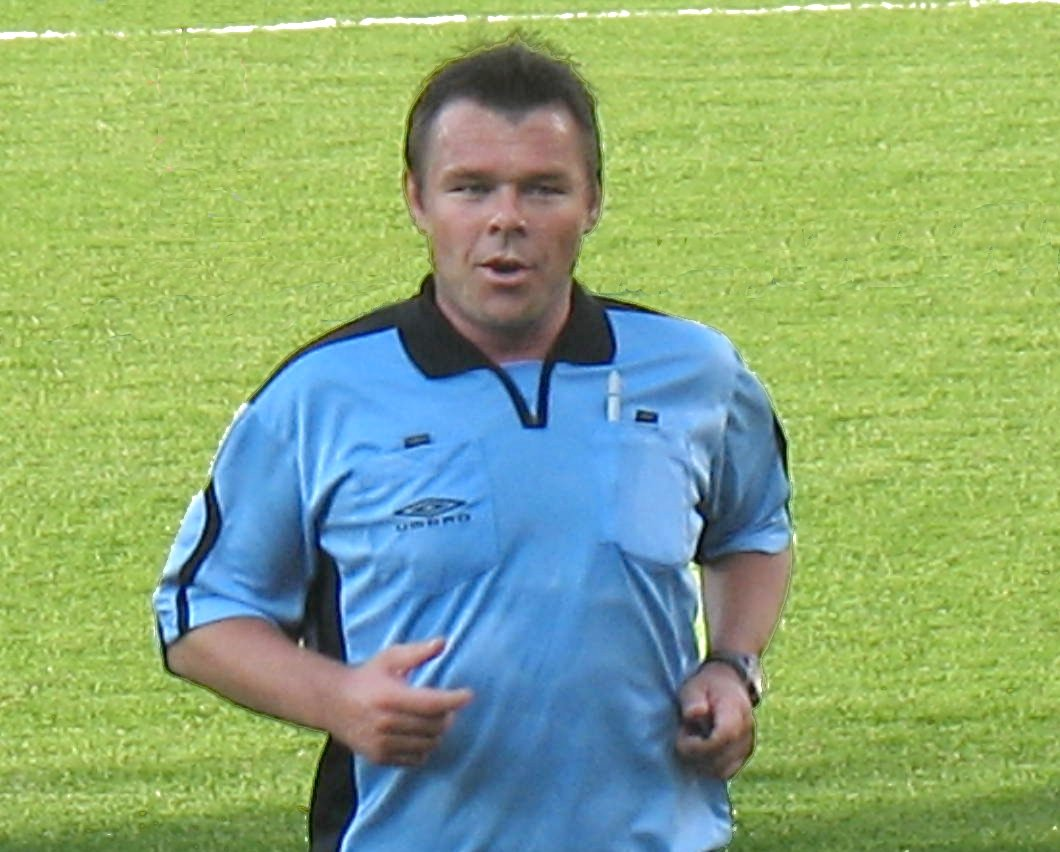
- Per Ivar Staberg as a referee

Personal information
- Date of birth: 16 October 1969 (age 57)
- Position: Goalkeeper

Senior career*
Years	Team	Apps	(Gls)
–2004	Harstad	32	(0)
2005	Alta	7	(0)
Total		39	(0)
- * Club domestic league appearances and goals

Per Ivar Staberg (born 16 October 1969) is a former Norwegian football referee and player. Staberg officials for Harstad and has since 1995 officiated 141 matches in the Norwegian Premier League he became authorised as FIFA-referee in 2003.

He was the referee in the Norwegian Cup final in 2007.

== Playing career ==
Staberg had besides refereeing a long career as a goalkeeper, playing for OBOS-ligaen sides Harstad and Alta until 2005.
