= Stian Johnsen =

Norwegian footballer (born 1981)

Personal information
- Full name: Stian Dagfinn Johnsen
- Date of birth: 1 November 1981 (age 45)
- Position: Winger

Youth career
- Hardhaus
- Mjølner/Narvik
- 2000–2001: Fredrikstad

Senior career*
Years	Team	Apps	(Gls)
1999	Narvik		
2000	Beisfjord		
2001–2004	Fredrikstad		
2005–2006	Aalesund	16	(0)
2006–2008	Haugesund	45	(11)
2008–2012	Mjølner		
2013	Hardhaus		
2019	Beisfjord		

Managerial career
- 2013: Hardhaus
- 2014–2015: Harstad
- 2016–2018: Mjølner
- 2020–: Staal
- * Club domestic league appearances and goals

Stian Dagfinn Johnsen (born 1 November 1981) is a retired Norwegian football winger and later manager.

He played senior football for Narvik FK and Beisfjord IL before joining Fredrikstad FK's junior team. He made his senior debut in 2001 and played until 2004, experiencing promotion from the 2. divisjon to Eliteserien.

Ahead of the 2005 he went on to Aalesunds FK, in the summer of 2006 to FK Haugesund, and in the summer of 2008 to FK Mjølner.

In 2013 he became player-manager of SK Hardhaus. He went on to coach Harstad IL in 2014, FK Mjølner in 2016, and Staal Jørpeland IL in 2020.
