= Svein Tore Brandshaug =

Norwegian footballer (born 1979)

Personal information
- Date of birth: 11 May 1979 (age 47)
- Position: Midfielder

Youth career
- Molde

Senior career*
Years	Team	Apps	(Gls)
1999–2002	Molde	4	(0)
2000–2001	→ Hamkam (loan)	39	(9)
2003–2006	Strømsgodset	91	(15)
2007–2009	Haugesund	32	(6)
2010–2012	Skeid		
2016–2017	Årvoll		

International career
1996–1997	Norway U17	10	(1)
1997	Norway U18	4	(0)
1998	Norway U19	3	(1)
1999	Norway U20	1	(0)
2000	Norway U21	2	(0)

Managerial career
- Årvoll
- * Club domestic league appearances and goals

Svein Tore Brandshaug (born 11 May 1979) is a Norwegian footballer who played as a midfielder. He played in Eliteserien for Molde, followed by spells on the second tier with Hamarkameratene (on loan), Strømsgodset and Haugesund.

He made his youth international debut in 1996, among others scoring a winning goal against Belarus in the 1997 UEFA European Under-18 Championship qualifying. Molde won the Norwegian Youth Cup in both 1996 and 1997; in 1997 Brandshaug and Anders Hasselgård were named by Odd Berg as the team members with the most "extreme qualities". Brandshaug made his Eliteserien debut in June 1999 against Moss.

His greatest Molde match was a friendly in March 1999, away against AFC Ajax. After Richard Witschge and Benni McCarthy gave Ajax a 2–0 lead, Molde eventually won 5–2, ending with a hat-trick by Brandshaug. The first goal was a shot in open play, the last two were both headers from corner kicks. This match was still remembered, decades later. One year later, Brandshaug scored the only goal in a friendly victory over De Graafschap.

In mid-2000, Brandshaug was loaned out to Hamkam. Brandshaug's home debut in the league came in July 2000 against Kjelsås. He scored once and got one assist, as well as showing playmaker capabilities in midfield. Brandshaug was so used to playing for Molde that he was overheard shouting "Come on, Molde!" several times to pep up his teammates. Ahead of the 2001 season, Brandshaug stayed on loan at Hamkam. Molde had made a deal with L/F Hønefoss to loan Brandshaug to that club, which the player did not want. He proved his worth during Hamkam's pre-season friendlies, scoring against Kongsvinger and Gefle, the latter from a 40-metre raid. After the 2001 season, Molde refused to let Brandshaug remain on loan. Hamkam would have to buy the player, who was contracted to Molde until the end of 2002. Brandshaug desired to try his luck in Eliteserien again.

Returning to Molde, Brandshaug only got the chance to play for their B team, residing in the Second Division. "Svein Tore is so skilled that he really has no business playing on a Second Division team", stated the coach Odd Berg. A rumour sprung up that Brandshaug was followed by SK Brann.

In 2003, Brandshaug did not want to pursue playing time in Molde anymore, and agreed to a transfer to Strømsgodset. According to Drammens Tidende, the transfer fee was 100,000 kr with an additional 50,000 after 40 matches. Notably, he converted a bicycle kick against Mandalskameratene, and later scored twice against his old club Hamkam, though Strømsgodset struggled in the league table. Strømsgodset also slumped to the bottom half of the table in 2004. Brandshaug stated that "two quality players" would have made the positive difference.

Brandshaug lost his starting place in Strømsgodset as the 2006 season progressed, though the team won the 2006 First Division. Instead, Brandshaug moved to FK Haugesund in 2007 to help them achieve the same. He was sought after by the manager Rune Skarsfjord. Haugesund had a good start to the season. In late May Brandshaug scored twice, again, against his former club Hamkam. In late May he scored against Bodø/Glimt, who suffered their first loss of the season, but Brandshaug was also injured in the same match and remained out for two months.

After helping Haugesund win promotion to the 2010 Eliteserien, Brandshaug would leave the club. He sat in meetings with Kristiansund BK regarding a possible transfer. He was also considered by IL Hødd and Mjøndalen IF, but ended up moving to Oslo to sign for Skeid. Skeid was immediately embroiled in financial problems, signalizing a 70% wage cut, and failing to pay the March salary.

Brandshaug later worked as a football trainer at Rønningen Folk High School in Northern Oslo. He also managed the local team Årvoll IL together with Torgeir Hoås. Brandshaug also played sparingly, in instances where the team ran out of substitutes.
