= FK Lofoten =

Norwegian sports club

- Full name: Fotballklubben Lofoten
- Founded: 10 December 1992; 32 years ago
- Ground: Kabelvåg Kunstgress
- Capacity: 3000
- Chairman: Tommy Rød
- Coach: Terje Hansen; Frank Vegar Esperø
- League: 4. Divisjon
- 2024: 4. Divisjon, 5th
- Website: www.fklofoten.no
Home colours

FK Lofoten is a Norwegian football club, currently playing in the 4. Divisjon. The club was formed as a merger between Svolvær IL and Kabelvåg IL in 1992. The club played in the 1. divisjon in the 1999 season, but was relegated after one season.

== History ==
The club played in the 1. divisjon in the 1999 season, but they were however relegated in their only season at the second tier. In the decisive match on 17 October 1999, Lofoten had to win away against Sogndal while Byåsen and Skjetten had to draw if Lofoten was going to avoid relegation. Lofoten did their job by beating Sogndal 2–0, and in the match between Byåsen and Skjetten the score was 1–1 after 90 minutes. Byåsen did however score a winning goal in the stoppage time and Lofoten were relegated.

The goal for the 2000 season was to again win promotion. Lofoten won their 2. divisjon group, but lost the play-off matches for promotion against Mandalskameratene. After the 2. Divisjon was changed from eight to four groups, the group-winners would automatically win promotion. Lofoten was fighting for promotion for a couple of years, but never managed to win their group again. Due to the poor economy the club lost several of its most important players, and as a consequence Lofoten was relegated to the 3. divisjon in 2005.

The club was promoted to the 2. Divisjon in 2007, after winning their 3. Divisjon group and beat Innstrand 4–3 on aggregate in the play-off matches for promotion.

In the 2007 Norwegian Football Cup, Lofoten won the qualifying matches against Grovfjord, and was drawn against the 2. Divisjon team Mjølner in the first round. After eliminating Mjølner, Lofoten met the regional greats Bodø/Glimt in the second round. Lofoten lost 1–3 after extra time at home against the 1. Divisjon team.

In the 2008 season, Lofoten finished last in their 2. Divisjon group and were relegated to the 3. divisjon.

== Recent history ==
Season		Pos.	Pl.	W	D	L	GS	GA	P	Cup	Notes
1999	1. divisjon	↓ 11	26	8	6	12	38	47	30	Second round	relegated to the 2. divisjon
2000	2. divisjon	1	22	20	0	2	90	25	60	Third round	
2001	2. divisjon	3	26	15	6	5	63	43	51	First round	
2002	2. divisjon	5	26	11	8	7	53	41	41	Second round	
2003	2. divisjon	6	26	12	4	10	41	46	40	Third round	
2004	2. divisjon	10	26	10	2	14	50	66	32	Third round	
2005	2. divisjon	↓ 13	26	7	2	17	40	89	23	Second round	relegated to the 3. divisjon
2006	3. divisjon	2	22	15	1	6	77	30	46	First round	
2007	3. divisjon	↑ 1	18	14	3	1	62	14	45	Second round	promoted to the 2. divisjon
2008	2. divisjon	↓ 14	26	3	2	21	35	90	11	First round	relegated to the 3. divisjon
2009	3. divisjon	5	20	8	2	10	47	54	26	First qualifying round	
2010	3. divisjon	4	22	13	3	6	64	40	42	First qualifying round	
2011	3. divisjon	6	22	11	3	8	64	45	36	First qualifying round	
2012	3. divisjon	7	22	7	6	9	53	60	27	Second qualifying round	
2013	3. divisjon	4	22	11	4	7	48	44	37	Second qualifying round	
2014	3. divisjon	↓ 10	22	6	0	16	43	76	18	First qualifying round	relegated to the 4. Divisjon
2015	4. Divisjon	↑ 1	22	19	2	1	103	16	59	First qualifying round	promoted to the 3. divisjon
2016	3. divisjon	↓ 11	22	7	0	15	45	69	21	Second qualifying round	relegated to the 4. Divisjon
2017	4. Divisjon	2	22	15	5	2	109	38	50	First qualifying round	
2018	4. Divisjon	7	22	8	6	8	60	46	30	Second qualifying round	
2019	4. Divisjon	2	20	13	2	5	69	40	41	First qualifying round	
2021	4. Divisjon	5	8	4	0	4	25	21	12	First qualifying round	
2022	4. Divisjon	5	18	11	3	4	63	37	36	First qualifying round	
2023	4. Divisjon	5	18	10	1	7	56	50	31	First qualifying round	
2024	4. Divisjon	5	18	5	5	8	48	51	20	First qualifying round	

=== Current squad ===
As of 24 June 2024.

Note: Flags indicate national team as defined under FIFA eligibility rules; some limited exceptions apply. Players may hold more than one non-FIFA nationality.

No.	Pos.	Nation	Player
1	GK	NOR	Vegar Mateo Larsen
2	DF	NOR	Hugo Inge Nilsen
3	DF	ESP	Cristian Gomes Pujadas
5	MF	ESP	Joel Ibanez Veas
7	DF	ESP	Alejandro Perez Alcala
8	FW	NOR	Marius Mørtsell
9	MF	NOR	Edvard Helmersen Lind (captain)
10	FW	ESP	Ivan Esteve Simon
11	DF	NOR	Anton Relling

No.	Pos.	Nation	Player
15	MF	ESP	Jose Luis Serrano Cordoba
19	FW	NOR	Omar Abdulnaser Aljenki
22	FW	NOR	Ahmad Houri
24	MF	NOR	Abdul Moneem Abdulnaser Aljenki
40	DF	ESP	Alejandro Morante Marti
41	MF	ESP	Carlos Ballesteros Benitez
42	DF	NOR	Ade Pratt-Bjørnstad
44	FW	NOR	Henning Johnsen Holand
45	DF	NOR	Patrick Hansen Rasul

== Honours ==
- Champions 2. divisjon avd. 8: 1997, 1998 and 2000
- Champions 3. divisjon avd. 17: 1994 and 1996
- Champions 3. divisjon avd. Hålogaland: 2007
- Best Finish: 11th place in 1. divisjon (1999)
- Best Cup Run: 3rd round in 2000, 2003 and 2004

== Notable players ==
- Stig Johansen
- Petter Solli
- Bjørn Strøm
- Andreas Knutzen
- Vegard Hansen
- Hans Jørgen Andersen
- Odd-Karl Stangnes
- Stein Berg Johansen
- Vegard Berg Johansen
- Vegard Lysvoll
- Daniel Aga
