= Søren Jensen (footballer) =

Danish footballer (born 1984)

Personal information
- Full name: Søren Kolbye Jensen
- Date of birth: 1 March 1984 (age 42)
- Place of birth: Århus, Denmark
- Height: 1.80 m (5 ft 11 in)
- Position: Left wing back

Senior career*
Years	Team	Apps	(Gls)
2001–2005	Viborg	27	(1)
2003	→ FC Nordjylland (loan)	0	(0)
2004	→ Vejle BK (loan)	0	(0)
2006–2008	OB	31	(0)
2008–2011	Odd Grenland	15	(0)
2010–2011	→ Randers FC (loan)	46	(5)
2011–2014	AC Horsens	38	(2)
2014–2015	FC Fredericia		

International career
2006	Denmark U21	4	(0)
- * Club domestic league appearances and goals

Søren Kolbye Jensen (born 1 March 1984) is a Danish former professional footballer who played as a defender.
