= Vegard Berg Johansen =

Norwegian footballer (born 1973)

Personal information
- Date of birth: 15 July 1973 (age 53)
- Position: Striker

Youth career
- Svolvær

Senior career*
Years	Team	Apps	(Gls)
–1992	Svolvær		
1993−1996	Tromsdalen		
1997	Haugesund	18	(4)
1997−1998	Belenenses	12	(2)
1998	Haugesund	1	(0)
1999	Lofoten		
2000–2001	Tromsdalen	42	(18)
2002–2003	Tromsø	12	
2004	Tromsdalen	13	(7)

Managerial career
- 2006–2007: Lyngen/Karnes
- 2008−2010: Fløya
- 2013–2014: Tromsø (CEO)
- * Club domestic league appearances and goals

Vegard Berg Johansen (born 15 July 1973) is a retired Norwegian football striker.

He started his football career in Svolvær. Joining Tromsdalen ahead of the 1993 season, he made his first-tier debut in 1997 for FK Haugesund. He was sold to C.F. Os Belenenses after the 1997 season, but after the 1997-98 Primeira Divisao he returned to Haugesund. In 1999 he joined his hometown football team, now called FK Lofoten. In 2000, he took yet another second spell in one of his former clubs, playing two seasons for Tromsdalen. After playing the 2002 season for Tromsø IL he was left out of the team for a year, before a third and final spell in Tromsdalen. (Note: Vegard Berg Johansen at the Norwegian Football Federation (in Norwegian)) (Note: Vegard Berg Johansen at WorldFootball.net)

He is an younger brother of Stein Berg Johansen and Ørjan Berg Johansen.

Ahead of the 2006 season he became the head coach of Lyngen/Karnes IL. After the 2007 season he went on to IF Fløya, lasting through 2010. From early 2013 to early 2014 he was the chief executive officer of Tromsø Fotball.
