= Michael Trulsen =

Norwegian footballer (born 1989)

Personal information
- Full name: Michael Sandberg Trulsen
- Date of birth: 28 December 1989 (age 36)
- Position: Forward

Youth career
- Torp
- Fredrikstad

Senior career*
Years	Team	Apps	(Gls)
2008–2009	Fredrikstad	8	(0)
2010–2011	Sarpsborg 08		
2011	Nybergsund		
2012	Østsiden		
2014–2016	Lisleby		
- * Club domestic league appearances and goals

Michael Trulsen (born 28 December 1989) is a Norwegian footballer who plays as a forward for Lisleby.

He started his senior career in Fredrikstad, appearing eight times in the Norwegian Premier League of 2008 and 2009. In 2010, he went on to neighbors Sarpsborg 08, who won promotion, and in 2011 he played seven first-tier games for them. He joined Nybergsund in mid-season.

After the 2011 season he joined Østsiden IL in his hometown, but retired already in August 2012. He later made a comeback for lower-tier Lisleby.
