= Stein Berg Johansen =

Norwegian footballer and coach (born 1969)

Stein Berg Johansen (born 10 June 1969) is a retired Norwegian football striker and current coach.

He was born in Levanger, but grew up in Svolvær. He started his career in Svolvær IL and made his senior debut at the age of 18. In 1989, he transferred to FK Mjølner and played in the 1989 Norwegian First Division (highest tier). He scored 10 league goals and was capped thrice for the Norway national under-21 football team. He studied at Narvik University College, later the University of Tromsø.

In 1991, he joined the first-tier club Tromsø IL. He scored the club's first European goal, in the 1991–92 UEFA Cup, and won the 1996 Norwegian Football Cup. He also played for SFK Lyn briefly in 1994, and in 1999 for FK Lofoten. He also had a short spell in Tromsdalen UIL in 2001, but was forced to retire due to injury.

Stein Berg Johansen started a coaching career for Tromsø IL's junior team in 2002. In 2009, he became head coach of Harstad IL.

He is the brother of Ørjan Berg Johansen and Vegard Berg Johansen
