= Førde IL =

Sports club in Norway

- Full name: Førde Idrettslag
- Nickname
- Founded: 4 January 1920; 105 years ago
- Ground: Førde Stadion
- Capacity: 2,000
- League: Third Division
- 2024: Third Division group 1, 6th of 14
- Website: https://www.fordeidrettslag.no/

Førde Idrettslag is a Norwegian sports club based in the town of Førde in Sunnfjord Municipality. It has sections for alpine skiing, association football, athletics, biathlon, cross-country skiing, floorball, gymnastics, handball, orienteering, powerlifting, ski jumping, swimming and weightlifting. The club was founded by Nikolai Schei on 4 January 1920.

== Football ==
The football section, Førde IL Fotball, was founded on 17 November 1945. The men's football team currently plays in the Norwegian Third Division. They play their home games at Førde Stadion which has a capacity of 2,000 spectators. In 2016, Førde knocked Brann out of the Norwegian Cup. It was the first time since 1939 that Brann got knocked out in the first round. Notable former players include Vegar Gjermundstad, Kristian Fardal Opseth, Thor Jørgen Spurkeland and Alexander Ødegaard.

=== Recent seasons ===
Season	League									Cup	Notes
Season	Division	Pos.	Pl.	W	D	L	GS	GA	P	Cup	Notes
2010	2. divisjon	8	26	10	5	11	43	61	35	Second round	
2011	2. divisjon	↓ 13	26	7	5	14	43	50	26	First round	Relegated
2012	3. divisjon	↑ 1	26	19	3	4	99	30	60	Did not participate	Promoted
2013	2. divisjon	3	26	17	0	9	64	47	51	First round	
2014	2. divisjon	5	26	10	9	7	40	42	39	First round	
2015	2. divisjon	10	26	9	6	11	47	48	33	First round	
2016	2. divisjon	↓ 14	26	4	7	15	29	70	19	Second round	Relegated
2017	3. divisjon	8	26	9	7	10	47	49	34	First round	
2018	3. divisjon	↓ 13	26	4	8	14	32	68	20	Second qual. round	Relegated
2019	4. divisjon	2	22	18	1	3	72	15	55	Second qual. round	
2020	Season cancelled										
2021	4. divisjon	↑ 1	10	10	0	0	53	9	30	Did not participate	Promoted
2022	3. divisjon	2	26	17	4	5	68	32	55	First round	
2023	3. divisjon	10	26	8	4	14	56	55	28	First round	
2024	3. divisjon	6	26	14	3	9	55	48	45	First round	
