= 2000 Norwegian First Division =

1. divisjon
- Season: 2000
- Dates: 30 April – 22 October
- Champions: Lyn
- Promoted: Lyn; Strømsgodset; Sogndal
- Relegated: Strindheim; Eik-Tønsberg
- Matches played: 182
- Goals scored: 623 (3.42 per match)
- Top goalscorer: Jostein Flo (25 goals)

The 2000 1. divisjon, Norway's second-tier football league, began play on 30 April 2000 and ended on 22 October 2000. The league was contested by 14 teams, and the top two teams won promotion to Tippeligaen, while the third placed played a promotion-playoff against the 12th-placed team in Tippeligaen to win promotion. Due to an expansion from 14 to 16 teams in the next season's First Division only two teams were relegated to the 2. divisjon.

Lyn and Strømsgodset won direct promotion to Tippeligaen, while Sogndal was promoted after having beaten Vålerenga in the promotion-playoff. Strindheim and Eik-Tønsberg was relegated to the 2. divisjon.

== League table ==
Pos	Team	Pld	W	D	L	GF	GA	GD	Pts	Promotion or relegation
1	Lyn (C, P)	26	19	4	3	55	24	+31	61	Promotion to Tippeligaen
2	Strømsgodset (P)	26	18	5	3	70	28	+42	59	Promotion to Tippeligaen
3	Sogndal (O, P)	26	15	6	5	73	37	+36	51	Qualification for the promotion play-offs
4	Raufoss	26	11	6	9	50	39	+11	39	
5	Kongsvinger	26	11	6	9	44	38	+6	39	
6	HamKam	26	11	5	10	48	44	+4	38	
7	L/F Hønefoss	26	10	4	12	45	42	+3	34	
8	Kjelsås	26	8	7	11	30	40	−10	31	
9	Tromsdalen	26	9	2	15	37	62	−25	29	
10	Skeid	26	7	7	12	36	52	−16	28	
11	Sandefjord	26	8	4	14	35	53	−18	28	
12	Byåsen	26	9	1	16	33	58	−25	28	
13	Strindheim (R)	26	7	5	14	39	58	−19	26	Relegation to Second Division
14	Eik-Tønsberg (R)	26	6	4	16	28	48	−20	22	Relegation to Second Division

Source: nifs.no
Rules for classification: 1) points; 2) goal difference; 3) number of goals scored.
(C) Champions; (O) Play-off winners; (P) Promoted; (R) Relegated

== Results ==
Home \ Away	BYÅ	EIK	HAM	KJE	KIL	LFH	LYN	RIL	SAN	SKD	SDL	SDM	SIF	TUIL
Byåsen	—	0–4	0–2	2–2	2–1	4–3	3–1	1–2	1–0	1–2	0–1	1–2	1–2	1–0
Eik-Tønsberg	0–1	—	1–0	1–2	0–0	0–1	0–3	0–5	0–0	2–4	3–5	3–1	0–1	4–1
HamKam	4–1	4–2	—	3–0	4–2	1–1	2–4	1–2	3–0	1–0	2–5	0–0	3–3	3–0
Kjelsås	2–0	0–0	1–0	—	0–0	2–1	2–2	4–4	1–1	2–1	0–3	1–1	1–3	2–1
Kongsvinger	2–1	1–0	1–1	1–1	—	2–0	3–2	0–2	2–0	5–2	2–2	3–1	1–2	3–4
L/F Hønefoss	3–2	0–2	4–2	2–1	0–1	—	0–2	3–2	1–2	4–1	2–0	3–0	0–1	5–0
Lyn	2–1	1–0	3–0	2–0	2–3	3–2	—	1–0	1–0	1–0	2–0	4–0	2–0	2–0
Raufoss	2–3	0–0	4–2	1–0	1–1	3–3	0–3	—	3–0	2–4	0–2	2–0	0–0	3–1
Sandefjord	5–3	3–0	0–2	2–1	0–3	3–2	0–2	1–4	—	2–2	2–2	4–1	0–4	3–0
Skeid	3–1	2–1	0–1	2–1	0–0	0–0	0–0	2–1	0–4	—	0–1	0–3	0–6	1–1
Sogndal	0–0	7–1	2–2	2–1	5–4	1–1	1–2	1–0	6–0	3–3	—	6–1	1–1	6–0
Strindheim	0–1	0–3	2–0	2–1	1–2	4–1	3–3	2–2	2–0	6–5	2–4	—	3–3	2–3
Strømsgodset	10–2	4–0	5–2	2–0	2–0	1–2	2–2	3–1	4–2	2–1	4–1	1–0	—	4–2
Tromsdalen	3–0	2–1	1–3	1–2	3–1	2–1	2–3	1–4	3–1	1–1	2–6	2–0	1–0	—

Source: NIFS (in Norwegian)
Legend: Blue = home team win; Yellow = draw; Red = away team win.

== Top scorers ==
Rank	Player	Club	Goals
1	(Norway) Jostein Flo	Strømsgodset	25
2	(Faroe Islands) Kurt Mørkøre	Sogndal	20
3	(Norway) Tommy Øren	Sogndal	15
4	(Sweden) Marino Rahmberg	Raufoss	14
5	(Norway) Lars Kåre Gustavsen	Hønefoss	13
6	(Norway) Christer George	Strømsgodset	12
6	(Norway) Espen Haug	Lyn	12
8	(Norway) Tommy Nilsen	Lyn	11
9	(Norway) Frode Birkeland	Lyn	9
9	(Norway) Anders Michelsen	Strømsgodset	9
9	(Norway) Tomas Nygård	HamKam	9
9	(Norway) Hans Erik Ødegaard	Strømsgodset	9
9	(Norway) Alexander Ødegaard	Sogndal	9
