= 2004 Norwegian First Division =

1. divisjon
- Season: 2004
- Dates: 12 April – 31 October
- Champions: Start
- Promoted: Start; Aalesund
- Relegated: Raufoss; Haugesund; Vard Haugesund; Tromsdalen
- Matches played: 240
- Goals scored: 832 (3.47 per match)
- Top goalscorer: Paul Oyuga (18 goals)

The 2004 1. divisjon was a Norwegian second-tier football season. The season kicked off on 12 April 2004, and the final round was played on 31 October 2004.

Start were promoted to the 2005 Tippeligaen as First Division winners, along with Aalesund who finished second. Start will be playing in the top division for the first time since 2002. Aalesund, meanwhile, returned to the top flight after being relegated in 2003.

As in previous seasons, there was a two-legged promotion play-off at the end of the season, between the third-placed team in the 1. divisjon (Kongsvinger) and the twelfth-placed team in the Tippeligaen (Bodø/Glimt). Bodø/Glimt kept their spot in the Tippeligaen, beating Kongsvinger 4–1 on aggregate.

== League table ==
Pos	Team	Pld	W	D	L	GF	GA	GD	Pts	Promotion or relegation
1	Start (C, P)	30	24	2	4	71	28	+43	74	Promotion to Tippeligaen
2	Aalesund (P)	30	21	1	8	67	36	+31	64	Promotion to Tippeligaen
3	Kongsvinger	30	16	5	9	53	42	+11	53	Qualification for the promotion play-offs
4	Sandefjord	30	15	6	9	60	32	+28	51	
5	Mandalskameratene	30	13	6	11	51	55	−4	45	
6	Hødd	30	14	2	14	63	59	+4	44	
7	Bryne	30	11	9	10	54	45	+9	42	
8	Skeid	30	12	6	12	57	56	+1	42	
9	Strømsgodset	30	11	7	12	42	45	−3	40	
10	Moss	30	11	5	14	48	47	+1	38	
11	Pors Grenland (Note: Pors Grenland was deducted 2 points for using ineligible players.)	30	11	7	12	56	60	−4	38	
12	Hønefoss BK	30	11	4	15	52	54	−2	37	
13	Raufoss (R)	30	10	7	13	42	47	−5	37	Relegation to Second Division
14	Haugesund (R)	30	11	4	15	44	59	−15	37	Relegation to Second Division
15	Vard Haugesund (R)	30	7	3	20	43	83	−40	24	Relegation to Second Division
16	Tromsdalen (R)	30	3	4	23	29	84	−55	13	Relegation to Second Division

Source: nifs.no
Rules for classification: 1) points; 2) goal difference; 3) number of goals scored.
(C) Champions; (P) Promoted; (R) Relegated

== Results ==
Home \ Away	AAL	BRY	FKH	ILH	HBK	KIL	MAN	MOS	PRS	RIL	SAN	SKD	IKS	SIF	TUIL	VAR
Aalesund	—	1–0	3–2	1–2	3–2	3–1	5–2	1–0	6–0	1–0	2–1	3–0	1–2	3–0	6–0	4–0
Bryne	1–4	—	2–1	2–1	2–2	5–1	0–1	4–2	1–1	1–1	1–1	0–4	3–0	0–0	6–1	4–0
Haugesund	0–1	2–2	—	2–0	2–0	0–0	2–0	2–4	1–0	3–2	0–3	3–4	2–3	2–1	3–0	1–5
Hødd	1–1	0–0	5–0	—	2–1	3–2	4–0	1–0	3–1	1–2	0–3	1–3	1–5	4–0	7–1	3–0
Hønefoss	0–2	3–1	5–0	1–3	—	3–4	0–2	2–4	4–0	0–1	3–2	1–3	4–3	0–1	1–0	2–1
Kongsvinger	0–1	2–1	2–1	3–0	0–0	—	2–1	1–0	2–0	0–1	0–0	2–0	0–2	2–0	3–2	6–1
Mandalskameratene	3–2	0–3	3–0	5–2	2–3	0–3	—	5–1	3–2	1–1	3–2	1–1	1–4	1–0	3–0	3–2
Moss	2–1	2–4	2–3	1–2	4–1	3–0	0–0	—	2–2	0–0	0–3	4–0	0–1	0–0	1–3	2–1
Pors Grenland	1–2	0–0	2–3	4–3	4–3	3–0	4–0	2–4	—	3–1	1–1	1–1	1–1	4–3	3–0	5–2
Raufoss	0–1	1–4	2–2	2–3	1–3	3–4	5–2	3–0	1–1	—	1–0	2–0	1–3	1–0	1–1	0–1
Sandefjord	2–0	3–0	1–2	3–1	1–1	1–1	2–3	1–0	2–0	3–0	—	3–1	0–1	5–1	2–1	9–1
Skeid	4–1	4–2	1–0	3–2	2–2	3–1	2–2	0–4	1–3	1–2	1–2	—	1–2	3–4	6–0	2–2
Start	4–1	2–1	2–1	4–1	2–0	0–1	0–0	2–0	4–0	2–1	3–0	3–1	—	2–1	6–0	4–2
Strømsgodset	2–4	2–2	1–1	4–1	1–0	1–1	0–0	1–1	3–1	1–2	2–1	1–2	3–0	—	4–2	1–0
Tromsdalen	3–1	1–2	3–1	0–2	0–2	0–4	1–3	0–1	3–5	1–1	1–2	2–2	0–1	0–1	—	2–3
Vard Haugesund	1–2	2–0	0–2	5–4	1–3	4–5	2–1	1–4	0–2	4–3	1–1	0–1	0–3	0–3	1–1	—

Source: NIFS (in Norwegian)
Legend: Blue = home team win; Yellow = draw; Red = away team win.

== Top goalscorers ==
Rank	Scorer	Club	Goals
1	(Kenya) Paul Oyuga	Bryne	18
2	(Norway) Magnus Myklebust	Hødd	16
3	(England) Ben Wright	Start	15
3	(Norway) Dag Roar Ørsal	Hødd	15
3	(Norway) Morten Moldskred	Aalesund	15
3	(Norway) Håvard Sakariassen	Moss	15
7	(Norway) John Erling Kleppe	Pors Grenland	14
7	(Nigeria) Bala Garba	Start	14
9	(Norway) Mohammed Abdellaoue	Skeid	11
9	(Norway) Henrik Nyhus	Mandalskameratene	11
9	(Norway) Bjørn Yngvar Kydland	Bryne	11
9	(Norway) Kim Larsen	Strømsgodset	11

== Relegated teams ==
These two teams were relegated from the Tippeligaen in 2003. 12th-place finishers Vålerenga defeated Sandefjord in the playoff to retain their spot in the highest division.

- Aalesund
- Bryne

== Promoted teams ==
These four teams were promoted from the 2. divisjon in 2003:

- Pors Grenland
- Kongsvinger
- Vard Haugesund
- Tromsdalen

== See also ==
- 2004 in Norwegian football
- 2004 Tippeligaen
- 2004 2. divisjon
- 2004 3. divisjon
