= Paul Oyuga =

Kenyan footballer

Personal information
- Full name: Paul Mbuya Oyuga
- Date of birth: April 7, 1973 (age 53)
- Place of birth: Nairobi, Kenya
- Height: 1.81 m (5 ft 11 1/2 in)
- Position: Striker

Team information
- Current team: Ålgård FK (Player/Assistant Manager)
- Number: 30

Youth career
- 1996–1997: AFC Leopards

College career
Years	Team	Apps	(Gls)
1998–2000	Southern Connecticut		

Senior career*
Years	Team	Apps	(Gls)
2001–2003	Örebro SK	15	(4)
2004–2007	Bryne FK	51	(13)
2007–2010	Sandnes Ulf	100	(45)
2010–2012	Ålgård FK	26	(5)

International career^{‡}
2003–2008	Kenya	25	(13)
- * Club domestic league appearances and goals ‡ National team caps and goals as of 2 September 2008

Paul Mbuya Oyuga (born 7 April 1973 in Nairobi) is a Kenyan professional football forward who played for Norwegian team Ålgård FK.

== Career ==
He has played club football for AFC Leopards, Connecticut Wolves, Örebro SK, Bryne FK, Sandnes Ulf and Ålgård FK. Oyuga has played 25 international matches for the Kenyan national team.

His brother, Stephen Oyuga, is currently playing as a defender at Campbell University in Buies Creek, North Carolina.
