= Anders Blomquist (footballer) =

Swedish footballer

Personal information
- Full name: Anders Lars Gustav Blomquist
- Date of birth: 28 April 1977 (age 49)
- Height: 1.78 m (5 ft 10 in)
- Position: Forward

Senior career*
| Years | Team | Apps | (Gls) |
| 1996–1998 | Öster | | |
| 1999–2000 | Haugesund | 43 | (23) |
- * Club domestic league appearances and goals

Anders Blomquist (born 28 April 1977) is a Swedish retired football striker.
