= Norwegian First Division =

Norwegian association football league

- Founded: 1948; 78 years ago 2015–present (as OBOS-ligaen); 2014 (as 1. divisjon); 2005–2013 (as Adeccoligaen); 1991–2004 (as 1. divisjon); 1963–1990 (as 2. divisjon); 1948–1951 (as 1. divisjon)
- Country: Norway
- Confederation: UEFA
- Number of clubs: 16
- Level on pyramid: 2
- Promotion to: Eliteserien
- Relegation to: Norwegian Second Division
- Domestic cup: Norwegian Cup
- Current champions: Lillestrøm (1st title) (2025)
- Most championships: HamKam; Vålerenga (7 titles)
- Broadcaster: TV 2 until 2027. Direktesport from 2027
- Website: obos-ligaen.no
- Current: 2026 Norwegian First Division

The Norwegian First Division, also called 1. divisjon (Norwegian: første divisjon) and OBOS-ligaen (due to sponsoring ties with OBOS), is the second-highest level of the Norwegian football league system. Each year, the top finishing teams in the 1. divisjon are promoted to the Eliteserien, and the lowest finishing teams are relegated to 2. divisjon.

1. divisjon was previously known as 2. divisjon (1963–1990) and replaced regional league Landsdelsserien (1951–1962) after the latter was dissolved after the 1961–62 season. The second tier was also prior to Landsdelsserien known as 1. divisjon (1948–1951). Formally, it was a semi-professional league. The tier has been restructured many times and consists of 16 teams at present.

== History ==
Between 1963 and 1990, the second highest level in Norwegian football was named 2. divisjon. In 1991, due to rebranding of the top flight level in 1990, it was renamed to its initial name; 1. divisjon. 1. divisjon has been the name of this level ever since, except for periods when the league has had a sponsor-affiliated name. Between 2005 and 2013 the level was known as Adeccoligaen and from 2015 to 2020 the name is OBOS-ligaen.

== Format ==
=== Previous ===
In the 1997 season, 1. divisjon merged from two divisions consisting of 12 teams each, to only one with 14 teams. In the 2001 season, 1. divisjon expanded from 14 to 16 teams. Only two teams were relegated in the 2000 season. In 2009, the number of teams in Eliteserien expanded from 14 to 16. Therefore, only one team was relegated to 1. divisjon, whilst three teams were promoted to Tippeligaen.

=== Current ===
Since 2012 four teams, finishing 3rd to 6th, has qualified for promotion play-offs. In the 2017 season the relegation format was changed. The previous format where four teams were relegated was replaced with a format with two relegation spots and one relegation play-off spot.

The league is contested by 16 teams. During the course of a season, each club plays the others twice, home and away, for a total of 30 games for each club, and a total of 240 games in a season. The season starts in April and lasts until early November. The top two teams will be promoted to Eliteserien, while the teams placed from third to sixth place will play a promotion-playoff against each other to earn the right to play a two-legged game against the 14th-placed team in Eliteserien to win promotion. The bottom two teams will be relegated to the 2. divisjon known as PostNord-ligaen, and the team in 14th place will play a two-legged playoff against the play-off winner among the two-second-placed teams in 2. divisjon.

=== Changes in competition format ===
From	To	Group(s)	Teams	Match-weeks	Season Start	Season End	Dir. promoted	Promotion play-off spots
1948–49	1950–51	11	83–84	10–14	Autumn	Spring	none	11
1951–52	1960–61	7	54	12–14	Autumn	Spring	2	5
1961–62		7	55	18–21	Autumn	Spring	2	5
1963	1971	2	16	14	Spring	Autumn	2	none
1972	1975	2 + 2 districts	35–36	10–14	Spring	Autumn	2	3
1976		2 + 1 district	28	14–18	Spring	Autumn	2	3
1977	1978	2 + 1 district	30	18	Spring	Autumn	2	3
1979	1993	2	24	22	Spring	Autumn	2	2
1994		2	24	22	Spring	Autumn	4	none
1995	1996	2	24	22	Spring	Autumn	2	2
1997	2000	1	14	26	Spring	Autumn	2	1
2001	2007	1	16	30	Spring	Autumn	2	1
2008		1	16	30	Spring	Autumn	3	1
2009	2010	1	16	30	Spring	Autumn	2	3
2011		1	16	30	Spring	Autumn	2	none
2012	Present	1	16	30	Spring	Autumn	2	4

== Current members ==
The following 16 clubs are competing in the 2025 Norwegian First Division.

Locations of teams in the 2025 Norwegian First Division

Team	Location	County	Arena	Turf	Capacity
Aalesund	Ålesund	Møre og Romsdal	Color Line Stadion	Artificial	10,778
Egersund	Egersund	Rogaland	B&G Parken	Artificial	1,200
Hødd	Ulsteinvik	Møre og Romsdal	Høddvoll	Artificial	4,081
Kongsvinger	Kongsvinger	Innlandet	Gjemselund	Artificial	5,824
Lillestrøm	Lillestrøm	Akershus	Åråsen	Natural	12,250
Lyn	Oslo	Oslo	Bislett	Natural	15,400
Mjøndalen	Mjøndalen	Buskerud	Consto Arena	Artificial	4,200
Moss	Moss	Østfold	Melløs	Natural	2,373
Odd	Skien	Telemark	Skagerak Arena	Artificial	11,767
Ranheim	Trondheim	Trøndelag	EXTRA Arena	Artificial	3,000
Raufoss	Raufoss	Innlandet	NAMMO Stadion	Artificial	3,042
Skeid	Oslo	Oslo	OBOS Idrettspark Nordre Åsen	Artificial	1,486
Sogndal	Sogndalsfjøra	Vestland	Fosshaugane Campus	Artificial	5,622
Stabæk	Bærum	Akershus	Nye Nadderud	Artificial	8,001
Start	Kristiansand	Agder	Sparebanken Sør Arena	Artificial	14,448
Åsane	Bergen	Vestland	Åsane Arena	Artificial	3,300

== Sponsorship ==
Ahead of the 2015 season, a six-year deal was agreed with the housing cooperative OBOS. In the period from 2015 to 2020, 1. divisjon will be named OBOS-ligaen.

Period	Sponsor	Name
1948–1951	No sponsor	1. divisjon
1951–1962	No sponsor	Landsdelsserien
1963–1990	No sponsor	2. divisjon
1991–2004	No sponsor	1. divisjon
2005–2013	Adecco	Adeccoligaen
2014	No sponsor	1. divisjon
2015–	OBOS	OBOS-ligaen

1. divisjon has a number of official partners and suppliers. The official ball supplier for the league is Umbro who on 20 February 2020 signed the first ever contract to deliver official balls for OBOS-ligaen. The two-year deal began from the start of the 2020 season.

== Statistics ==
From 1963 to 1990, the second tier in Norwegian football was named 2. divisjon. Until 1996, the 1. divisjon teams was split in two groups. This statistics shows the winning cubs, runners-ups, play-off teams, top goal scorer and the league's average attendances starting with the first one-group 1. divisjon season in 1997. Teams in bold won the promotion play-offs and were promoted to Eliteserien.

Season	Winner	Runner-up	Promotion play-offs	Top scorer	Avg. att.
2025	Lillestrøm	Start	Kongsvinger, Aalesund, Egersund, Ranheim	20 – Lucas Haren (Kongsvinger) and Thomas Lehne Olsen (Lillestrøm)	2 205
2024	Vålerenga	Bryne	Moss, Egersund, Lyn, Kongsvinger	19 – John Hou Sæter (Ranheim)	1 851
2023	Fredrikstad	KFUM Oslo	**Kristiansund**, Kongsvinger, Start, Bryne	16 – Benjamin Stokke (Kristiansund)	1 851
2022	Brann	Stabæk	Start, KFUM Oslo, Sandnes Ulf and Kongsvinger	16 – Bård Finne (Brann) and Gift Orban (Stabæk)	2 057
2021	HamKam	Aalesund	**Jerv**, Fredrikstad, KFUM Oslo and Sogndal	24 – Oscar Aga (Grorud)	917
2020	Tromsø	Lillestrøm	Sogndal, Ranheim, Åsane and Raufoss	19 – Henrik Udahl (Åsane)	213
2019	Aalesund	Sandefjord	**Start**, KFUM Oslo, Kongsvinger and Sogndal	19 – Pontus Engblom (Sandefjord)	1 434
2018	Viking	Mjøndalen	Aalesund, Sogndal, Ullensaker/Kisa and Nest-Sotra	21 – Tommy Høiland (Viking)	1 711
2017	Bodø/Glimt	Start	Mjøndalen, **Ranheim**, Sandnes Ulf and Ullensaker/Kisa	28 – Kristian Fardal Opseth (Bodø/Glimt)	1 422
2016	Kristiansund	Sandefjord	Jerv, Sandnes Ulf, Kongsvinger and Mjøndalen	26 – Pontus Engblom (Sandnes Ulf)	1 495
2015	Sogndal	Brann	Kristiansund, Hødd, Jerv and Ranheim	17 – Pontus Engblom (Sandnes Ulf) and Robert Stene (Ranheim)	1 998
2014	Sandefjord	Tromsø	**Mjøndalen**, Kristiansund, Bærum and Fredrikstad	19 – Pål Alexander Kirkevold (Sandefjord)	1 376
2013	Bodø/Glimt	Stabæk	Hødd, Ranheim, Hamarkameratene and Mjøndalen	18 – Jo Sondre Aas (Ranheim)	1 453
2012	Start	Sarpsborg 08	Sandefjord, Mjøndalen, Bodø/Glimt and Ullensaker/Kisa	20 – Martin Wiig (Sarpsborg 08)	1 330
2011	Hønefoss BK	Sandnes Ulf	NFF removed the play-offs ahead of the season	18 – Vegard Braaten (Alta)	1 186
2010	Sogndal	Sarpsborg 08	**Fredrikstad**, Løv-Ham and Ranheim	17 – Marius Helle (Bryne)	1 544
2009	Haugesund	Hønefoss	**Kongsvinger**, Sogndal and Sarpsborg 08	24 – Thomas Sørum (Haugesund)	1 271
2008	Odd Grenland	Sandefjord (2nd) and Start (3rd)	Sogndal	22 – Péter Kóvacs (Odd Grenland)	1 984
2007	Molde	Hamarkameratene	**Bodø/Glimt**	23 – Kenneth Kvalheim (Notodden)	1 726
2006	Strømsgodset	Aalesund	Bryne	19 – Mattias Andersson (Strømsgodset)	1 981
2005	Stabæk	Sandefjord	Moss	27 – Daniel Nannskog (Stabæk)	1 388
2004	Start	Aalesund	Kongsvinger	18 – Paul Oyuga (Bryne)	1 696
2003	Hamarkameratene	Fredrikstad	Sandefjord	19 – Markus Ringberg (Fredrikstad)	1 656
2002	Tromsø	Aalesund	Sandefjord	18 – Morten Gamst Pedersen (Tromsø)	1 174
2001	Vålerenga	Start	Hamarkameratene	18 – Bala Garba (Haugesund) and Marino Rahmberg (Raufoss)	1 490
2000	Lyn	Strømsgodset	**Sogndal**	25 – Jostein Flo (Strømsgodset)	775
1999	Haugesund	Bryne	**Start**	17 – Anders Blomquist (Haugesund)	1 033
1998	Odd Grenland	Skeid	Kjelsås	18 – Caleb Francis (Bryne)	741
1997	Vålerenga	Moss	Eik-Tønsberg	16 – Espen Musæus (Vålerenga)	1 169
