= 1995 Molde FK season =

Molde
1995 season
- Chairman: Sondre Kåfjord
- Head coach: Åge Hareide
- Stadium: Molde Stadion
- Tippeligaen: 2nd
- Norwegian Cup: Fourth round vs. Hødd
- Cup Winners' Cup: First round vs. Paris Saint-Germain
- Top goalscorer: League: Ole G. Solskjær (20); All: Ole Gunnar Solskjær (29)
- Highest home attendance: 12,990 vs Rosenborg (2 July 1995)
- Average home league attendance: 4,987

The 1995 season was Molde's 20th season in the top flight of Norwegian football, the first since their promotion back to the first tier in 1994. This season Molde competed in Tippeligaen, Norwegian Cup and the 1995–96 UEFA Cup Winners' Cup.

In Tippeligaen, Molde finished in 2nd position, 15 points behind winners Rosenborg.

Molde participated in the 1995 Norwegian Cup. They were knocked out in the fourth round by Hødd with the score 0–2.

== Squad ==
Note: Flags indicate national team as defined under FIFA eligibility rules; some limited exceptions apply. Players may hold more than one non-FIFA nationality.

No.	Pos.	Nation	Player
1	GK	NOR	Morten Bakke
2	MF	NOR	Jan Berg
3	DF	NOR	Petter Christian Singsaas
4	DF	ESP	Flaco
5	DF	NOR	Knut Anders Fostervold
6	MF	NOR	Daniel Berg Hestad
7	MF	NOR	Ronald Wenaas
8	MF	NOR	Tarje Nordstrand Jacobsen
9	FW	NOR	Tor Gunnar Johnsen
11	DF	NOR	Trond Andersen
12	MF	NOR	Bjarte Skuseth
13	GK	NOR	Are Lervik

No.	Pos.	Nation	Player
14	DF	NOR	Sindre Rekdal
15	MF	NOR	Petter Rudi
16	FW	NOR	Arild Stavrum
17	DF	NOR	Trond Strande
18	MF	NOR	Berdon Sønderland
20	FW	NOR	Ole Bjørn Sundgot
21	FW	NOR	Ole Gunnar Solskjær
22	DF	NOR	Ole Erik Stavrum
23	DF	NOR	Odd Petter Lyngstad
24	MF	NOR	Per Olav Sætre
40	MF	NOR	Anders Hasselgård
99		NOR	Terje Lervik

== Friendlies ==
1995	Tromsø	1 – 0	Molde	Tromsø
CET (UTC+1)	Goal	Report		Stadium: Skarphallen

1995	Molde	6 – 1	Alta	Tromsø
CET (UTC+1)	Goal	Report	Goal	Stadium: Skarphallen

1995	Molde	1 – 1	Hødd	Fredrikstad
CET (UTC+1)	Goal	Report	Goal	Stadium: Østfoldhallen

1995	Molde	1 – 1 (6–5 p)	Lillestrøm	Fredrikstad
CET (UTC+1)	Goal	Report	Goal	Stadium: Østfoldhallen

1995	Molde	2 – 2	Bodø/Glimt	Hamar
CET (UTC+1)	Goal	Report	Goal	Stadium: Vikingskipet
Note: Bodø/Glimt won on penalties

1995	Molde	3 – 3	Brann	Hamar
CET (UTC+1)	Goal	Report	Goal	Stadium: Vikingskipet

1995	Molde (Norway)	5 – 3	(Denmark) Copenhagen	Cyprus
CET (UTC+1)	Goal	Report	Goal

1995	Molde (Norway)	3 – 1	(Sweden) Oddevold	Cyprus
CET (UTC+1)	Goal	Report	Goal

1995	Molde	1 – 1 (4–5 p)	Rosenborg	Cyprus
CET (UTC+1)	Goal	Report	Goal

1995	Molde	5 – 0	Brann	Molde
CET (UTC+1)	Goal	Report		Stadium: Lubbenes kunstgress

1995	Molde	6 – 0	Åndalsnes	Molde
CET (UTC+1)	Goal	Report		Stadium: Lubbenes kunstgress

1995	Molde	2 – 0	Nardo	Molde
CET (UTC+1)	Goal	Report		Stadium: Lubbenes kunstgress

1995	Molde	1 – 0	Sogndal	Molde
CET (UTC+1)	Goal	Report		Stadium: Lubbenes kunstgress

1995	Slovan Bratislava (Slovakia)	1 – 1	(Norway) Molde	Slovakia
CET (UTC+1)	Goal	Report	Goal

1995	VfB Mödling (Austria)	0 – 1	(Norway) Molde	Austria
CET (UTC+1)		Report	Goal

1995	Molde	3 – 1	Fyllingen	Stord
CET (UTC+1)	Goal	Report	Goal

1995	Rosenborg	1 – 3	Molde	Trondheim
CET (UTC+1)	Goal	Report	Goal	Stadium: Lerkendal Stadion

== Competitions ==
=== Tippeligaen ===
==== Results summary ====
Overall								Home						Away					
Pld	W	D	L	GF	GA	GD	Pts	W	D	L	GF	GA	GD	W	D	L	GF	GA	GD
26	14	5	7	60	47	+13	47	8	1	4	32	28	+4	6	4	3	28	19	+9

Source: nifs.no

==== Positions by round ====
Round	1	2	3	4	5	6	7	8	9	10	11	12	13	14	15	16	17	18	19	20	21	22	23	24	25	26
Ground	A	H	A	H	A	H	A	H	A	H	A	A	H	A	H	H	A	H	A	H	A	H	A	H	A	H
Result	W	W	W	W	W	W	D	L	W	L	W	W	D	L	W	W	L	W	D	L	D	W	L	L	D	W
Position	1	2	1	1	1	1	2	2	2	2	2	2	2	2	2	2	2	2	2	2	2	2	2	2	2	2

Source: see below

==== Results ====
22 April 1995 1	Brann	0 – 6	Molde	Bergen
CET (UTC+1)		Report	Rekdal 12'; Sundgot 23', 27'; Solskjær 28', 84'; Stavrum 81' (pen.)	Stadium: Brann Stadion; Attendance: 9,902; Referee: Tom Henning Øvrebø

29 April 1995 2	Molde	5 – 4	Viking	Molde
CET (UTC+1)	Sundgot 8', 15'; Solskjær 22', 26', 75'	Report	Østenstad 27', 41'; Medalen 78', 90'	Stadium: Molde Stadion; Attendance: 4,430; Referee: Harald Hansen

3 May 1995 3	Lillestrøm	0 – 1	Molde	Lillestrøm
CET (UTC+1)		Report	Stavrum 29'	Stadium: Åråsen Stadion; Attendance: 7,848; Referee: Per-Arne Larsgård

7 May 1995 4	Molde	1 – 0	Stabæk	Molde
CET (UTC+1)	Hestad 61'	Report		Stadium: Molde Stadion; Attendance: 5,434; Referee: Terje Hauge

14 May 1995 5	HamKam	1 – 2	Molde	Hamar
CET (UTC+1)	Øverby 60'	Report	Solskjær 25', 85'	Stadium: Briskeby; Attendance: 2,614; Referee: Tom Henning Øvrebø

16 May 1995 6	Molde	7 – 2	Hødd	Molde
CET (UTC+1)	Stavrum 16', 25', 61'; Solskjær 23', 26', 53'; Sundgot 35'	Report	Sylte 62'; Nevstad 78'	Stadium: Molde Stadion; Attendance: 7,300; Referee: Roy Helge Olsen

21 May 1995 7	Tromsø	2 – 2	Molde	Tromsø
CET (UTC+1)	Hafstad 10'; Flo 55'	Report	Hestad 13'; Flaco 68'	Stadium: Alfheim Stadion; Attendance: 5,903; Referee: Tore Hollung

28 May 1995 8	Molde	0 – 1	VIF Fotball	Molde
CET (UTC+1)		Report	Kihle 89'	Stadium: Molde Stadion; Attendance: 5,830; Referee: Terje Hauge

2 June 1995 9	Start	1 – 3	Molde	Kristiansand
CET (UTC+1)	Løvland 21'	Report	Sundgot 14'; A. Stavrum 42'; Solskjær 77'	Stadium: Kristiansand Stadion; Attendance: 6,178; Referee: Sven Kjelbrott

11 June 1995 10	Molde	0 – 3	Bodø/Glimt	Molde
CET (UTC+1)		Report	Hansen 32' (pen.); Sørensen 43'; A. Berg 80'	Stadium: Molde Stadion; Attendance: 5,046; Referee: Thorbjørn Aass

18 June 1995 11	Strindheim	1 – 3	Molde	Trondheim
CET (UTC+1)	Evensen 88'	Report	Stavrum 6' (pen.); Solskjær 28'; Sundgot 90+1'	Stadium: Lerkendal Stadion; Attendance: 1,100; Referee: Håkon Bondal

25 June 1995 12	Kongsvinger	0 – 2	Molde	Kongsvinger
CET (UTC+1)		Report	Andersen 38'; Solskjær 70'	Stadium: Gjemselund Stadion; Attendance: 3,167; Referee: Jon Eilif Skjervold

2 July 1995 13	Molde	2 – 2	Rosenborg	Molde
CET (UTC+1)	Stavrum 52'; Rekdal 68'	Report	Soltvedt 24'; Bragstad 84'	Stadium: Molde Stadion; Attendance: 12,980; Referee: Håkon Bondal

23 July 1995 15	Molde	3 – 1	Kongsvinger	Molde
CET (UTC+1)	Stavrum 23'; Solskjær 30'; Sundgot 70'	Report	Riseth 6'	Stadium: Molde Stadion; Attendance: 4,800; Referee: Sven Kjelbrott

30 July 1995 16	Molde	4 – 1	Strindheim	Molde
CET (UTC+1)	Stavrum 35'; Solskjær 67' (pen.); Sundgot 69'; Berg 81'	Report	Høsøien 80' (pen.)	Stadium: Molde Stadion; Attendance: 2,966; Referee: Tom Henning Øvrebø

6 August 1995 17	Bodø/Glimt	3 – 2	Molde	Bodø
CET (UTC+1)	Solli 21'; Mikalsen 63'; Steinbakk 87'	Report	Stavrum 6'; Sundgot 70'	Stadium: Aspmyra Stadion; Attendance: 3,614; Referee: Tom Henning Øvrebø

20 August 1995 18	Molde	2 – 1	Start	Molde
CET (UTC+1)	Stavrum 25', 87'	Report	Belsvik 31'	Stadium: Molde Stadion; Attendance: 4,379; Referee: Harald Hansen

27 August 1995 19	VIF Fotball	2 – 2	Molde	Oslo
CET (UTC+1)	Aga jr. 4'; Nysæther 54'	Report	Sundgot 42'; Solskjær 52'	Stadium: Ullevaal Stadion; Attendance: 9,228; Referee: Rune Pedersen

2 September 1995 20	Molde	0 – 7	Tromsø	Molde
CET (UTC+1)		Report	Flo 2', 66', 90'; Johansen 7', 54'; Rushfeldt 19'; Pedersen 30'	Stadium: Molde Stadion; Attendance: 3,606; Referee: Jon Eilif Skjervold

10 September 1995 21	Hødd	2 – 2	Molde	Ulsteinvik
CET (UTC+1)	Sundgot 37'; Televik 82'	Report	Stavrum 70', 78'	Stadium: Høddvoll Stadion; Attendance: 3,843; Referee: Roy Helge Olsen

24 September 1995 22	Molde	3 – 2	HamKam	Molde
CET (UTC+1)	Sundgot 15'; Stavrum 71' (pen.); Hestad 73'	Report	Nordli 78', 88'	Stadium: Molde Stadion; Attendance: 2,228; Referee: Roy Helge Olsen

1 October 1995 23	Stabæk	3 – 1	Molde	Bærum
CET (UTC+1)	Kaasa 19'; Larsen 27'; Bakke 88'	Report	Solskjær 46'	Stadium: Nadderud Stadion; Attendance: 3,294; Referee: Arild Haugstad

4 October 1995 14	Rosenborg	2 – 0	Molde	Trondheim
CET (UTC+1)	Løken 46' (pen.), 85'	Report		Stadium: Lerkendal Stadion; Attendance: 13,932; Referee: Terje Hauge

7 October 1995 24	Molde	1 – 2	Lillestrøm	Molde
CET (UTC+1)	Hestad 50'	Report	Schiller 5'; Sandstø 66'	Stadium: Molde Stadion; Attendance: 2,335; Referee: Arild Thorp

15 October 1995 25	Viking	2 – 2	Molde	Stavanger
CET (UTC+1)	Østenstad 12', 18'	Report	Sundgot 15'; Solskjær 34'	Stadium: Stavanger Stadion; Attendance: 6,867; Referee: Thorbjørn Aass

22 October 1995 26	Molde	4 – 2	Brann	Molde
CET (UTC+1)	Solskjær 24', 55'; Rekdal 58'; Rudi 71'	Report	Hasund 12'; Johansson 40'	Stadium: Molde Stadion; Attendance: 3,435; Referee: Johnny Ditlefsen

==== League table ====
Pos	Team	Pld	W	D	L	GF	GA	GD	Pts	Qualification or relegation
1	Rosenborg (C)	26	19	5	2	78	29	+49	62	Qualification for the Champions League second qualifying round
2	Molde	26	14	5	7	60	47	+13	47	Qualification for the UEFA Cup qualifying round
3	Bodø/Glimt	26	12	7	7	65	43	+22	43	Qualification for the UEFA Cup qualifying round
4	Lillestrøm	26	11	8	7	50	36	+14	41	Qualification for the Intertoto Cup group stage
5	Viking	26	12	4	10	55	42	+13	40	

Source: fotball.no
Rules for classification: 1) points; 2) goal difference; 3) number of goals scored.
(C) Champions

=== Norwegian Cup ===
10 May 1995 First round	Brattvåg	2 – 4	Molde	Brattvåg
CEST (UTC+2)	Goal	Report	Solskjær; Sundgot; Hestad

31 May 1995 Second round	Sunndal	0 – 2	Molde	Sunndalsøra
CEST (UTC+2)		Report	Solskjær 56', 65'	Stadium: Sande Stadion; Attendance: 815; Referee: Per Ivar Staberg

21 June 1995 Third round	Molde	2 – 1	Aalesund	Molde
CEST (UTC+2)	Solskjær 11', 35'	Report	Klausen 33'	Stadium: Molde Stadion; Attendance: 1,481; Referee: Frode Kvam

26 August 1995 Fourth round	Hødd	2 – 0	Molde	Ulsteinvik
CEST (UTC+2)	Sylte 39', 69'	Report		Stadium: Høddvoll Stadion; Attendance: 5,178; Referee: Terje Hauge

=== UEFA Cup Winners' Cup ===
==== Qualifying round ====
10 August 1995 Qualifying round 1st leg	Dinamo-93 Minsk (Belarus)	1 – 1	(Norway) Molde	Minsk, Belarus
19:00 CEST (UTC+2)	Lobanov 36'}	Report	Solskjær 85'	Stadium: Dinamo Stadium; Attendance: 6,000; Referee: Claude Détruche (Switzerland)

24 August 1995 Qualifying round 2nd leg	Molde (Norway)	2 – 1 (3 – 1 agg.)	(Belarus) Dinamo-93 Minsk	Molde, Norway
18:00 CEST (UTC+2)	Solskjær 4'; Stavrum 68'	Report	Skripchenko 20'	Stadium: Molde Stadion; Attendance: 2,989; Referee: Jürgen Aust (Germany)

==== First round ====
14 September 1995 First round 1st leg	Molde (Norway)	2 – 3	(France) Paris Saint-Germain	Molde, Norway
20:30 CEST (UTC+2)	Solskjær 56'; Stavrum 82'	Report	Le Guen 72'; Djorkaeff 78' (pen.); Dely Valdés 84'	Stadium: Molde Stadion; Attendance: 3,379; Referee: John Rowbotham (England)

28 September 1995 First round 2nd leg	Paris Saint-Germain (France)	3 – 0 (6 – 2 agg.)	(Norway) Molde	Paris, France
20:30 CEST (UTC+2)	Nouma 9', 14'; Djorkaeff 80'	Report		Stadium: Parc des Princes, Paris; Attendance: 18,898; Referee: Sándor Piller (Hungary)

== Squad statistics ==
=== Appearances and goals ===
Appearance statistics from Norwegian Cup rounds 1–3 are incomplete.

No.	Pos	Nat	Player	Total		Tippeligaen		Norwegian Cup		Cup Winners' Cup	
No.	Pos	Nat	Player	Apps	Goals	Apps	Goals	Apps	Goals	Apps	Goals
1	GK	(Norway) NOR	Morten Bakke	31	0	26	0	1	0	4	0
2	MF	(Norway) NOR	Jan Berg	3	1	0+2	1	0+1	0	0	0
3	DF	(Norway) NOR	Petter Christian Singsaas	17	0	14	0	1	0	1+1	0
4	DF	(Spain) ESP	Flaco	21	1	10+7	1	0+1	0	2+1	0
5	DF	(Norway) NOR	Knut Anders Fostervold	27	1	22	1	1	0	4	0
6	MF	(Norway) NOR	Daniel Berg Hestad	33	4	26	3	3	1	4	0
7	MF	(Norway) NOR	Ronald Wenaas	8	0	4+2	0	0	0	1+1	0
8	MF	(Norway) NOR	Tarje Nordstrand Jacobsen	23	0	14+6	0	1	0	2	0
9	FW	(Norway) NOR	Tor Gunnar Johnsen	5	0	0+4	0	0	0	0+1	0
11	DF	(Norway) NOR	Trond Andersen	22	1	11+7	1	1	0	3	0
12	MF	(Norway) NOR	Bjarte Skuseth	14	0	2+10	0	0	0	0+2	0
14	DF	(Norway) NOR	Sindre Rekdal	27	3	22+1	3	1	0	3	0
15	MF	(Norway) NOR	Petter Rudi	31	1	25	1	1+1	0	4	0
16	FW	(Norway) NOR	Arild Stavrum	33	18	26	16	3	0	4	2
17	DF	(Norway) NOR	Trond Strande	18	0	16+1	0	1	0	0	0
18	MF	(Norway) NOR	Berdon Sønderland	4	0	2+1	0	0+1	0	0	0
20	FW	(Norway) NOR	Ole Bjørn Sundgot	34	14	26	13	4	1	4	0
21	FW	(Norway) NOR	Ole Gunnar Solskjær	34	29	26	20	4	6	4	3
22	DF	(Norway) NOR	Ole Erik Stavrum	14	0	8+4	0	0	0	2	0
23	DF	(Norway) NOR	Odd Petter Lyngstad	8	0	6	0	0	0	2	0
24	DF	(Norway) NOR	Per Olav Sætre	3	0	0+2	0	0	0	0+1	0
40	MF	(Norway) NOR	Anders Hasselgård	1	0	0+1	0	0	0	0	0
99		(Norway) NOR	Terje Lervik	1	0	0+1	0	0	0	0	0

=== Goalscorers ===
Rank	Position	Nat.	Player	Tippeligaen	Norwegian Cup	Cup Winners' Cup	Total
1	FW	(Norway)	Ole Gunnar Solskjær	20	6	3	29
2	FW	(Norway)	Arild Stavrum	16	0	2	18
3	FW	(Norway)	Ole Bjørn Sundgot	13	1	0	14
4	MF	(Norway)	Daniel Berg Hestad	3	1	0	4
5	DF	(Norway)	Sindre Rekdal	3	0	0	3
6	DF	(Norway)	Trond Andersen	1	0	0	1
6	MF	(Norway)	Jan Berg	1	0	0	1
6	DF	(Spain)	Flaco	1	0	0	1
6	DF	(Norway)	Knut Anders Fostervold	1	0	0	1
6	MF	(Norway)	Petter Rudi	1	0	0	1
			TOTALS	60	8	5	73

== See also ==
- Molde FK seasons
