= 1995 Norwegian Football Cup =

Norgesmesterskapet i fotball for herrer

Tournament details
- Country: Norway
- Teams: 128 (main competition)

Final positions
- Champions: Rosenborg (7th title)
- Runners-up: Brann

Tournament statistics
- Matches played: 130
- Top goal scorer: Harald Brattbakk (10)

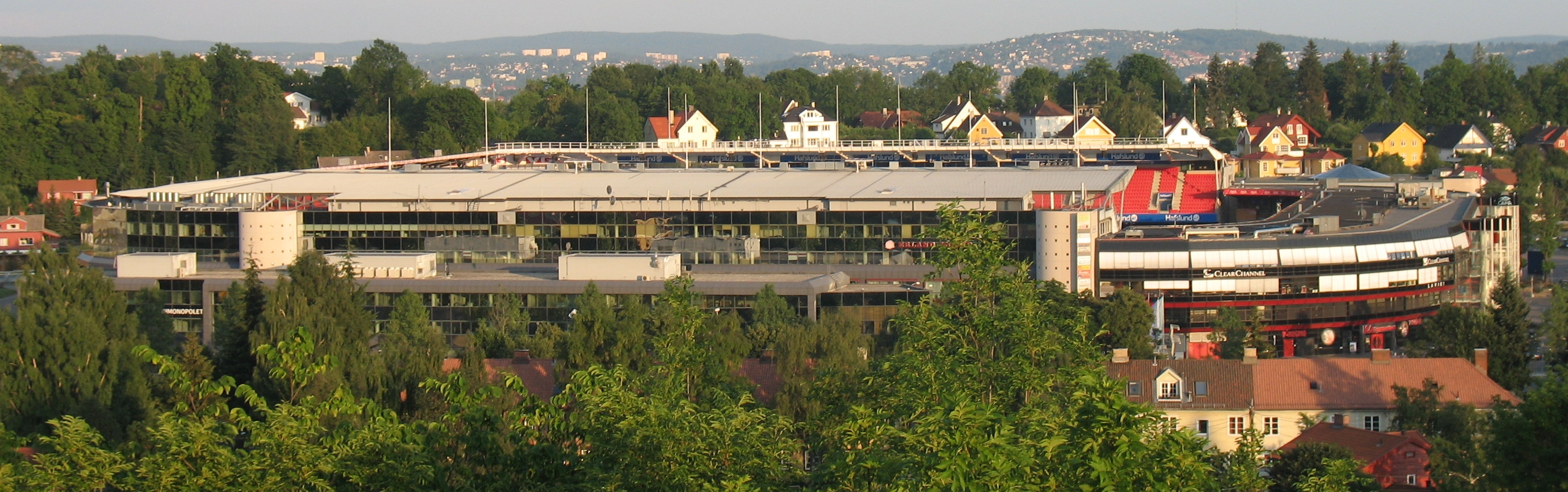
Ullevaal Stadion, Oslo - venue for the Norwegian Cup final

The 1995 Norwegian Football Cup was the 90th edition of the Norwegian Football Cup. The 1995 Norwegian Football Cup was won by Rosenborg after they defeated Brann in the final. It took a replay to decide the winner.

== Calendar ==
Below are the dates for each round as given by the official schedule:

Round	Date(s)	Number of fixtures	Clubs
First round	9–10 May 1995	64	128 → 64
Second round	30–31 May 1995	32	64 → 32
Third round	21 June 1995	16	32 → 16
Fourth round	27 July 1995	10	16 → 8
Quarter-finals	30 August 1995	4	8 → 4
Semi-finals	16–20 September 1995	4	4 → 2
Final	29 October 1995	2	2 → 1

== First round ==
Team 1	Score	Team 2
9 May 1995
Grei	0–1 (a.e.t.)	Stabæk
Nord	4–3 (a.e.t.)	Vidar
10 May 1995
Aurskog/Finstadbru	2–4	Kongsvinger
Bjerke	0–6	Lillestrøm
Bjørnar	0–3	Åsane
Bjørnevatn	1–7	Alta
Brattvåg	2–4	Molde
Bærum	2–1	Ørn-Horten
Eidsvold Turn	1–2	Nybergsund
Eiger	1–3	Bryne
Elverum	3–0	Fart
Faaberg	1–2	Liv/Fossekallen
Falk	2–3	Sprint-Jeløy
Fauske/Sprint	1–2	Gevir Bodø
Flekkefjord	5–0	Ålgård
Florø	1–2 (a.e.t.)	Fana
Fossum	1–2	Fram Larvik
Frigg	0–4	Skeid
Grovfjord	1–3	Mjølner-Narvik
Holter	0–1	Skjetten
Kolstad	3–1	Stjørdals/Blink
Kristiansund	2–4	Skarbøvik
Langesund	1–2	Pors
Langevåg	0–5	Aalesund
Larvik Turn	0–3	Sandefjord BK
Lillehammer	2–3 (a.e.t.)	Jevnaker
Lofoten	0–2	Bodø/Glimt
Lyngen/Karnes	2–4	Skarp
Løv-Ham	1–3	Fyllingen
Mo/Bossmo	3–3 (3–4 p)	Stålkameratene
Mosterøy	0–6	Viking
Namsos	0–2	Verdal
Narvik/Nor	0–4	Harstad
National	0–8	Rosenborg
Nest-Sotra	2–4	Brann
Nordstrand	0–9	Vålerenga
Orkanger	2–2 (3–4 p)	Nardo
Orkdal	2–4	Byåsen
Rakkestad	0–2	Moss
Ramfjord	2–7	Tromsø
Randaberg	2–2 (3–4 p)	Hana
Runar	0–2	Eik-Tønsberg
Råde	0–3	Lyn
Selbak	1–5 (a.e.t.)	Drøbak/Frogn
Ski	1–1 (7–6 p)	Fredrikstad
Skotfoss	0–8	Odd Grenland
Skreia	1–2	HamKam
Snøgg	0–3	Strømsgodset
Sola	4–1	Vigør
Stord	1–0	Haugesund
Stryn	1–3	Hødd
Sunndal	2–1 (a.e.t.)	Melhus
Sørumsand	1–2	Strømmen
Tranabakken	0–5	Strindheim
Tromsdalen	3–3 (1–4 p)	Skjervøy
Ullern	2–3 (a.e.t.)	Mjøndalen
Vadmyra	1–6	Sogndal
Varegg	0–2	Os
Vuku	1–2 (a.e.t.)	Steinkjer
Østsiden	0–3	Sarpsborg FK
Øyestad	1–2	Start
Åkra	3–2	Vard Haugesund
Åndalsnes	4–2	Clausenengen
Åssiden	4–5	Kjelsås

== Second round ==
Team 1	Score	Team 2
30 May 1995
Hødd	1–0	Skarbøvik
Rosenborg	5–0	Byåsen
Ski	0–3	Stabæk
Skjetten	0–1	Kongsvinger
31 May 1995
Bodø/Glimt	9–0	Kolstad
Brann	7–1	Stord
Bryne	6–1	Nord
Eik-Tønsberg	4–1	Sprint-Jeløy
Fana	2–0	Flekkefjord
Fram Larvik	0–1	Drøbak/Frogn
Hana	2–4	Fyllingen
Harstad	2–6	Mjølner-Narvik
Kjelsås	2–1	Skeid
Liv/Fossekallen	1–2	HamKam
Lyn	2–0	Elverum
Mjøndalen	0–5	Odd Grenland
Moss	2–0	Bærum
Os	3–2 (a.e.t.)	Åsane
Pors	1–4	Strømsgodset
Sarpsborg FK	3–3 (5–4 p)	Sandefjord BK
Skarp	1–5	Alta
Skjervøy	0–3	Tromsø
Sogndal	4–1	Jevnaker
Start	7–2	Sola
Steinkjer	0–3	Strindheim
Strømmen	1–0	Vålerenga
Stålkameratene	1–2	Gevir Bodø
Sunndal	0–2	Molde
Verdal	2–4	Nardo
Viking	6–1	Åkra
Aalesund	3–1	Åndalsnes
8 June 1995
Nybergsund	1–2	Lillestrøm

== Third round ==
Team 1	Score	Team 2
21 June 1995
Alta	2–6	Rosenborg
Bryne	2–0	Viking
Drøbak/Frogn	0–1 (a.e.t.)	Lyn
Fyllingen	1–3	Brann
Gevir Bodø	0–4	Bodø/Glimt
HamKam	2–0 (a.e.t.)	Sogndal
Kongsvinger	4–2	Kjelsås
Lillestrøm	7–0	Strømmen
Mjølner-Narvik	0–3	Tromsø
Molde	2–1	Aalesund
Nardo	2–4 (a.e.t.)	Hødd
Odd Grenland	2–2 (4–5 p)	Start
Sarpsborg FK	0–0 (6–7 p)	Eik-Tønsberg
Stabæk	2–2 (4–2 p)	Fana
Strindheim	4–2	Os
Strømsgodset	1–0	Moss

== Fourth round ==
26 July 1995

Brann	3–1	Bryne
Hasund 34'; Helland 42'; Karlsbakk 63'		Horn 16'

Brann Stadion, Bergen
Attendance: 4,412
Referee: Tom Henning Øvrebø

26 July 1995

Eik-Tønsberg	1–1 (a.e.t.)	Rosenborg
Sperre 77'		Brattbakk 74'

Tønsberg Gressbane, Tønsberg
Attendance: 8,675
Referee: Jon Skjervold

26 July 1995

HamKam	3–2 (a.e.t.)	Strømsgodset
Sætre 44', 93'; Sanden 89'		Røed 74'; Kokkim 90'

Briskeby gressbane, Hamar
Attendance: 2,655
Referee: Sven Kjelbrott

26 July 1995

Hødd	2–0	Molde
Sylte 39', 69'

Høddvoll Stadion, Ulsteinvik
Attendance: 5,178
Referee: Terje Hauge

26 July 1995

Lyn	1–1 (a.e.t.)	Stabæk
Tessem 28'		Slettebø 45'

Ullevaal Stadion, Oslo
Attendance: 1,801
Referee: Terje Singsaas

26 July 1995

Start	7–1	Bodø/Glimt
Belsvik 21', 26'; Dahlum 41', 58', 84'; Eftevaag 42'; Lund 88'		Johansen 42'

Kristiansand Stadion, Kristiansand
Attendance: 4,163
Referee: Frode Kvam

26 July 1995

Strindheim	0–1	Lillestrøm
		J. O. Pedersen 90'

Lerkendal Stadion, Trondheim
Attendance: 1,147
Referee: Arlid Haugstad

26 July 1995

Tromsø	3–1	Kongsvinger
M. Pedersen 32'; Flo 34'; Rushfeldt 79'		Riseth 71'

Alfheim Stadion, Tromsø
Attendance: 2,713
Referee: Thorbjørn Aass

=== Replay ===
2 August 1995

Rosenborg	4–1	Eik-Tønsberg
Brattbakk 12', 40'; Løken 58'; Iversen 70'		Studsrød 69'

Lerkendal Stadion, Trondheim
Attendance: 8,574
Referee: Rune Pedersen

9 August 1995

Stabæk	2–2 (a.e.t.)	Lyn
Viljugrein 67'; Basma 103' (pen.)		Amundsen 45'; Kolle 107' (pen.)
Penalties
Holter (penalty scored); Bakke (penalty missed); Frigård (penalty missed); Slettebø (penalty scored)	2–4	(penalty scored) Kolle; (penalty scored) Amundsen; (penalty scored) Aasbrenn; (penalty missed) Fladmark; (penalty scored) Motrøen

Nadderud Stadion, Bærum
Attendance: 1,439
Referee: Håkon Bondal

== Quarter-finals ==
30 August 1995

Rosenborg	2–0	Start
Brattbakk 43'; Iversen 74'

Lerkendal Stadion, Trondheim
Attendance: 5,333
Referee: Tore Hollung

30 August 1995

Lillestrøm	3–1	Tromsø
Frigård 56', 76'; Swift 62' (o.g.)		Rushfeldt 44'

Åråsen Stadion, Lillestrøm
Attendance: 3,869
Referee: Arild Thorp

30 August 1995

Brann	4–1	Lyn
Skjælaaen 30', 90'; Hasund 53'; Strandli 59'		Kolle 13'

Brann Stadion, Bergen
Attendance: 7,901
Referee: Per Arne Larsgård

30 August 1995

Hødd	3–2	HamKam
Blakstad 33'; Sundgot 53'; Televik 69' (pen.)		Sletten 49'; Øverby 77'

Høddvoll Stadion, Ulsteinvik
Attendance: 2,951
Referee: Roy Helge Olsen

== Semi-finals ==
=== First leg ===
16 September 1995

Lillestrøm	3–1	Brann
Solbakken 55'; Ingebrigtsen 85' (pen.), 90' (pen.)		Helland 67'

Åråsen Stadion, Lillestrøm
Attendance: 3,106
Referee: Roy Helge Olsen

17 September 1995

Hødd	0–5	Rosenborg
		Jakobsen 20'; Løken 29'; Soltvedt 33'; Blakstad 37' (o.g.); Brattbakk 72'

Høddvoll Stadion, Ulsteinvik
Attendance: 3,919
Referee: Rune Pedersen

=== Second leg ===
20 September 1995

Brann	4–1	Lillestrøm
Strandli 61' (pen.), 78'; Ludvigsen 74'; Hasund 80'		Pedersen 17'

Brann Stadion, Bergen
Attendance: 9,232
Referee: Terje Singsaas

Brann won 5–4 on aggregate.

20 September 1995

Rosenborg	2–1	Hødd
Strand 51'; Staurvik 57' (pen.)		Televik 62'

Lerkendal Stadion, Trondheim
Attendance: 3,775
Referee: Per Arne Larsgård

Rosenborg won 7–1 on aggregate.

== Final ==
=== First match ===
29 October 1995
13:15 CET (UTC+1)

Brann	1–1 (a.e.t.)	Rosenborg
Strandli 72' (pen.)	Report	Strand 61'

Ullevaal Stadion, Oslo
Attendance: 27,561
Referee: Jon Skjervold (Fet)

=== Replay match ===
5 November 1995
13:15 CET (UTC+1)

Rosenborg	3–1	Brann
Staurvik 23' (pen.); Hoftun 37'; Iversen 50'	Report	Ludvigsen 21'

Ullevaal Stadion, Oslo
Attendance: 20,076
Referee: Rune Pedersen (Sprint/Jeløy)
