= 1998 Molde FK season =

Molde
1998 season
- Chairman: Lars Erik Frisvold
- Head coach: Erik Brakstad
- Stadium: Molde Stadion
- Tippeligaen: 2nd
- Norwegian Cup: Quarter-final vs. Brann
- Top goalscorer: Andreas Lund (16)
- Highest home attendance: 13,308 vs Rosenborg (26 September 1998)
- Average home league attendance: 8,516

The 1998 season was Molde's 23rd season in the top flight of Norwegian football. This season Molde competed in Tippeligaen, the Norwegian Cup and the UEFA Cup. From 13 April to 22 August, Molde were unbeaten in 26 consecutive matches in all competitions; a club record.

In Tippeligaen, Molde finished in 2nd position, 9 points behind winners Rosenborg. Molde was unbeaten throughout the first 21 matches in the league, a club record streak which was beaten in the 2014 season. Their first loss of the season came on 20 September when they were defeated 3–1 by Vålerenga in Oslo. In the following round, Molde played Rosenborg at home in a possibly league-defining game since Molde before the match was only one point behind Rosenborg. Molde lost the match with the score 0–1 in the game which, as of 2019, holds the record home attendance on Molde Stadion with 13,308 spectators.

Molde participated in the 1998 Norwegian Cup. Because of the World Cup, the Tippeligaen teams entered in the third round. They defeated Fana and Viking on their way to the quarterfinal vs. Brann. At Brann Stadion on 8 September 2000, Molde lost the quarterfinal with the score 0–4.

In the UEFA Cup, Molde was drawn against Bulgarian team CSKA Sofia in the second qualifying round. Molde drew the first leg at home ground with the score 0–0. CSKA Sofia won the second leg 2–0 at home and advanced to the next round 2–0 on aggregate.

== Squad ==
Note: Flags indicate national team as defined under FIFA eligibility rules; some limited exceptions apply. Players may hold more than one non-FIFA nationality.

No.	Pos.	Nation	Player
1	GK	(Norway) NOR	Morten Bakke
2	DF	(Sweden) SWE	Dennis Schiller
3	DF	(Norway) NOR	Petter Christian Singsaas
4	DF	(Norway) NOR	Pål Lydersen
5	DF	(Norway) NOR	Knut Anders Fostervold (Captain)
6	MF	(Norway) NOR	Daniel Berg Hestad
7	DF	(Iceland) ISL	Bjarki Gunnlaugsson
8	MF	(Norway) NOR	Karl Oskar Fjørtoft
9	MF	(Norway) NOR	Odd Inge Olsen
10	FW	(Norway) NOR	Andreas Lund
11	MF	(Norway) NOR	Trond Andersen
12	GK	(Norway) NOR	Are Lervik

No.	Pos.	Nation	Player
13	FW	(Norway) NOR	Geir Televik
14	DF	(Norway) NOR	Sindre Rekdal
15	DF	(Norway) NOR	Freddy dos Santos
16	MF	(Norway) NOR	Per Olav Sætre
17	DF	(Norway) NOR	Trond Strande
18	MF	(Norway) NOR	Ståle Rønningen
19	MF	(Norway) NOR	Anders Hasselgård
20	FW	(Norway) NOR	Ole Bjørn Sundgot
21	MF	(Norway) NOR	Stian Ohr
22	FW	(Norway) NOR	Jo Tessem
23	MF	(Norway) NOR	Thomas Mork

As of end of season.

== Friendlies ==
1998	Molde	2 – 0	Lyn	Malvik
CET (UTC+1)	Goal	Report		Stadium: Abrahallen

1998	Rosenborg	4 – 3	Molde	Malvik
CET (UTC+1)	Goal	Report	Goal	Stadium: Abrahallen

1998	Moss	1 – 2	Molde	Fredrikstad
CET (UTC+1)	Goal	Report	Goal	Stadium: Østfoldhallen

1998	Molde	1 – 1	Hødd	Molde
CET (UTC+1)	Goal	Report	Goal	Stadium: Lubbenes Kunstgress

1998	Molde	3 – 1	Byåsen	Molde
CET (UTC+1)	Goal	Report	Goal	Stadium: Lubbenes Kunstgress

1998	Molde (Norway)	3 – 2	(Switzerland) Young Boys	La Manga, Spain
CET (UTC+1)	Goal	Report	Goal

1998	Molde	3 – 1	Lillestrøm	La Manga, Spain
CET (UTC+1)	Goal	Report	Goal

1998	Molde (Norway)	3 – 0	(Sweden) Örgryte	La Manga, Spain
CET (UTC+1)	Goal	Report

1998	Bodø/Glimt	4 – 0	Molde	Bodø
CET (UTC+1)	Goal	Report		Stadium: Nordlandshallen

1998	Molde (Norway)	3 – 2	(Sweden) Elfsborg	Belgium
CET (UTC+1)	Goal	Report	Goal

1998	Molde (Norway)	2 – 1	(Belgium) Lommel	Belgium
CET (UTC+1)	Goal	Report	Goal

1998	Molde (Norway)	2 – 0	Belgium military	Belgium
CET (UTC+1)	Goal	Report

1998	Molde	1 – 0	Strømsgodset	Larvik
CET (UTC+1)	Goal	Report

1998	Molde	5 – 0	Moss	Harøya, Sandøy Municipality
CET (UTC+1)	Goal	Report

1998	Molde	5 – 4	Tromsø	Bryne
CET (UTC+1)	Goal	Report	Goal

1998	Molde	3 – 0	Vålerenga	Bryne
CET (UTC+1)	Goal	Report

1998	Molde (Norway)	1 – 1	(Sweden) Spårvägen	Denmark
CET (UTC+1)	Goal	Report	Goal

== Competitions ==
=== Tippeligaen ===
==== Results summary ====
Overall								Home						Away					
Pld	W	D	L	GF	GA	GD	Pts	W	D	L	GF	GA	GD	W	D	L	GF	GA	GD
26	16	6	4	70	34	+36	54	7	4	2	37	17	+20	9	2	2	33	17	+16

Last updated: 26 April 2018.

==== Positions by round ====
Round	1	2	3	4	5	6	7	8	9	10	11	12	13	14	15	16	17	18	19	20	21	22	23	24	25	26
Ground	A	H	A	H	A	H	A	H	H	A	H	A	H	H	A	H	A	H	A	H	A	A	H	A	H	A
Result	W	W	D	D	W	W	W	W	W	W	D	W	D	W	D	D	W	W	W	W	W	L	L	W	L	L
Position	4	1	2	2	2	1	2	2	2	1	1	1	1	1	1	2	2	2	1	1	1	2	2	2	2	2

Source: see below

==== Results ====
13 April 1998 1	Haugesund	2 – 3	Molde	Haugesund
18:00 CET (UTC+1)	Helgeland 13'; Garba 81'	Report	Lund 28'; Andersen 34'; Ole Bjørn Sundgot 89'	Stadium: Haugesund Stadion; Attendance: 4,566; Referee: Tommy Skjerven

18 April 1998 2	Molde	4 – 0	Lillestrøm	Molde
16:00 CET (UTC+1)	Berntsen 4' (o.g.); Hestad 30'; Lund 38'; Gunnlaugsson 72'	Report		Stadium: Nye Molde Stadion; Attendance: 13,010; Referee: Jonny Ditlefsen

26 April 1998 3	Brann	2 – 2	Molde	Bergen
18:00 CET (UTC+1)	Mjelde 2'; Løvvik 54'	Report	Lund 19'; Hestad 35'	Stadium: Brann Stadion; Attendance: 11,885; Referee: Rune Pedersen

30 April 1998 4	Molde	1 – 1	Stabæk	Molde
19:00 CET (UTC+1)	Olsen 23'	Report	Flem 56'	Stadium: Molde Stadion; Attendance: 8,510; Referee: Roy Helge Olsen

3 May 1998 5	Bodø/Glimt	0 – 2	Molde	Bodø
18:00 CET (UTC+1)		Report	Sundgot 1'; Hestad 41'	Stadium: Aspmyra Stadion; Attendance: 4,416; Referee: Jon E. Skjervold

7 May 1998 6	Molde	6 – 0	Moss	Molde
19:00 CET (UTC+1)	Olsen 30', 80'; Lund 34', 45'; Sundgot 58'; Fjørtoft 67'	Report		Stadium: Molde Stadion; Attendance: 6,290; Referee: Jonny Ditlefsen

10 May 1998 7	Kongsvinger	0 – 3	Molde	Kongsvinger
18:00 CET (UTC+1)		Report	Lund 24'; Schiller 36'; Sundgot 45'	Stadium: Gjemselund Stadion; Attendance: 3,132; Referee: Roy Helge Olsen

16 May 1998 8	Molde	4 – 0	Sogndal	Molde
19:00 CET (UTC+1)	Lund 44'; Sundgot 48'; Tessem 66'; Hestad 76'	Report		Stadium: Molde Stadion; Attendance: 10,100; Referee: Tom Henning Øvrebø

7 June 1998 9	Molde	4 – 1	Vålerenga	Molde
18:00 CET (UTC+1)	Tessem 19'; Gunnlaugsson 55'; Olsen 90'; Rekdal 90+1'	Report	Kaasa 79'	Stadium: Molde Stadion; Attendance: 8,005; Referee: Frode Kvam

1 July 1998 10	Rosenborg	1 – 2	Molde	Trondheim
19:00 CET (UTC+1)	Jakobsen 35'	Report	Lund 60', 74'	Stadium: Lerkendal Stadion; Attendance: 16,067; Referee: Tom Henning Øvrebø

5 July 1998 11	Molde	2 – 2	Tromsø	Molde
18:00 CET (UTC+1)	Lund 2'; Olsen 81'	Report	Lange 51'; Hafstad 57'	Stadium: Molde Stadion; Attendance: 6,309; Referee: Tommy Skjerven

9 July 1998 12	Strømsgodset	1 – 2	Molde	Drammen
19:00 CET (UTC+1)	Flo 42'	Report	Hestad 49'; Olsen 73'	Stadium: Marienlyst Stadion; Attendance: 3,949; Referee: Frode Kvam

13 July 1998 13	Molde	4 – 4	Viking	Molde
20:15 CET (UTC+1)	Hasselgård 3', 6'; Mork 47'; Olsen 59'	Report	Bjerg 22', 63'; Daðason 72'; Aase 89'	Stadium: Molde Stadion; Attendance: 11,569; Referee: Tom Henning Øvrebø

19 July 1998 14	Molde	4 – 1	Haugesund	Molde
18:00 CET (UTC+1)	Olsen 15'; Mork 28'; Hestad 74'; Televik 87'	Report	Berre	Stadium: Molde Stadion; Attendance: 7,520; Referee: Tor-Arne Fiskum

26 July 1998 15	Lillestrøm	1 – 1	Molde	Lillestrøm
18:00 CET (UTC+1)	Andreassen 70'	Report	Hestad 59'	Stadium: Åråsen Stadion; Attendance: 4,609; Referee: Jonny Ditlefsen

1 August 1998 16	Molde	2 – 2	Brann	Molde
16:00 CET (UTC+1)	Olsen 15'; Hestad 45'	Report	Mjelde 64'; Kvisvik 88'	Stadium: Molde Stadion; Attendance: 7,466; Referee: Kjell Alseth

8 August 1998 17	Stabæk	1 – 4	Molde	Bærum
16:00 CET (UTC+1)	Belsvik 62'	Report	Tessem 11', 29'; Hasselgård 20'; Fostervold 75'	Stadium: Nadderud Stadion; Attendance: 5,202; Referee: Tommy Skjerven

16 August 1998 18	Molde	1 – 0	Bodø/Glimt	Molde
18:00 CET (UTC+1)	Lund 13'	Report		Stadium: Molde Stadion; Attendance: 6,045; Referee: Terje Hauge

22 August 1998 19	Moss	0 – 2	Molde	Moss
16:00 CET (UTC+1)		Report	Lund 59'; Televik 90'	Stadium: Melløs Stadion; Attendance: 2,458; Referee: Jon E. Skjervold

30 August 1998 20	Molde	4 – 1	Kongsvinger	Molde
18:00 CET (UTC+1)	Fjørtoft 7', 65'; Lund 69'; Schiller 90'	Report	Bergman 39'	Stadium: Molde Stadion; Attendance: 6,036; Referee: Kjell Alseth

13 September 1998 21	Sogndal	1 – 4	Molde	Sogndalsfjøra
13:00 CET (UTC+1)	Johansen 47'	Report	Lund 21'; Olsen 43'; Andersen 68'; Mork 85'	Stadium: Fosshaugane; Attendance: 1,055; Referee: Kjell Alseth

20 September 1998 22	Vålerenga	3 – 1	Molde	Oslo
15:00 CET (UTC+1)	Carew 49'; Viljugrein 87'; Ødegaard 90'	Report	Tessem 71'	Stadium: Ullevaal Stadion; Attendance: 12,318; Referee: Jon Eilif Skjervold

26 September 1998 23	Molde	0 – 2	Rosenborg	Molde
19:00 CET (UTC+1)		Report	Strand 67'; Dahlum 87'	Stadium: Molde Stadion; Attendance: 13,308; Referee: Rune Pedersen

4 October 1998 24	Tromsø	2 – 6	Molde	Tromsø
13:00 CET (UTC+1)	Lange 60', 81'	Report	Tessem 8', 69', 78'; Olsen 41'; Lund 47'; Sundgot 82'	Stadium: Alfheim Stadion; Attendance: 2,457; Referee: Espen Berntsen

18 October 1998 25	Molde	1 – 3	Strømsgodset	Molde
13:00 CET (UTC+1)	Lund 64'	Report	Flo 41'; Karlsen 62', 74'	Stadium: Molde Stadion; Attendance: 6,583; Referee: Kjell Alseth

25 October 1998 26	Viking	3 – 1	Molde	Stavanger
13:00 CET (UTC+1)	Andersen 6' (o.g.); Kristensen 8'; Bjerg 38'	Report	Ohr 17'	Stadium: Stavanger Stadion; Attendance: 4,621; Referee: Rune Pedersen

==== League table ====
Pos	Team	Pld	W	D	L	GF	GA	GD	Pts	Qualification or relegation
1	Rosenborg (C)	26	20	3	3	79	23	+56	63	Qualification for the Champions League group stage
2	Molde	26	16	6	4	70	34	+36	54	Qualification for the Champions League second qualifying round
3	Stabæk	26	16	5	5	63	29	+34	53	Qualification for the UEFA Cup first round (Note: Stabæk qualified for the UEFA Cup as Norwegian Cup winners.)
4	Viking	26	14	4	8	66	44	+22	46	Qualification for the UEFA Cup qualifying round (Note: Bodø/Glimt qualified for the UEFA Cup qualifying round through their Fair play ranking.)
5	Bodø/Glimt	26	9	9	8	47	47	0	36	Qualification for the UEFA Cup qualifying round

Source: fotball.no
Rules for classification: 1) points; 2) goal difference; 3) number of goals scored.
(C) Champions

=== Norwegian Cup ===
Due to Norway's participation in the 1998 FIFA World Cup, the Tippeligaen clubs entered the competition in the third round.

3 June 1998 Third Round	Fana	2 – 4	Molde	Fana
CEST (UTC+2)	Sandal 81'; Nybø 86'	Report 1 Report 2	Olsen 31'; Fostervold 53'; Sundgot 67'; Gunnlaugsson 71'	Stadium: Nesttun idrettspark Attendance: 480; Referee: Per Ivar Staberg

16 July 1998 Fourth Round	Molde	2 – 1	Viking	Molde
CEST (UTC+2)	Hestad 3' (pen.), 29' (pen.)	Report	Kristensen 11'	Stadium: Molde Stadion; Attendance: 6,488; Referee: Roy Helge Olsen

8 September 1998 Quarterfinal	Brann	4 – 0	Molde	Bergen
CEST (UTC+2)	Helstad 9', 75'; Ludvigsen 71'; Løvvik 73'	Report		Stadium: Brann Stadion; Attendance: 6,504; Referee: Rune Pedersen

=== UEFA Cup ===
==== Qualifying rounds ====
11 August 1998 Second qualifying round 1st leg	Molde (Norway)	0 – 0	(Bulgaria) CSKA Sofia	Molde
CEST (UTC+2)		Report	Ivanov (yellow card) 43'; Petrov (yellow card) 53'; Tchomakov (yellow card) 77'	Stadium: Molde Stadion; Attendance: 2,243

25 August 1998 Second qualifying round 2nd leg	CSKA Sofia (Bulgaria)	2 – 0 (2 – 0 agg.)	(Norway) Molde	Sofia
CEST (UTC+2)	Loultchev (yellow card) 7'; Petrov 33', (yellow card) 54'; Stantshev 60', (yellow card) 67'; Andonov (yellow card) 81'	Report	Fjørtoft (yellow card) 31'; Lydersen (yellow card) 36' (red card) 63'; Andersen (yellow card) 43'; Singsaas (yellow card) 69'; Hestad (yellow card) 80'	Stadium: Balgarska Armia Stadium; Attendance: 12,000

== Squad statistics ==
=== Appearances and goals ===
No.	Pos	Nat	Player	Total		Tippeligaen		Norwegian Cup		UEFA Cup	
No.	Pos	Nat	Player	Apps	Goals	Apps	Goals	Apps	Goals	Apps	Goals
1	GK	(Norway) NOR	Morten Bakke	31	0	26	0	3	0	2	0
2	DF	(Sweden) SWE	Dennis Schiller	18	2	11+5	2	1	0	0+1	0
3	DF	(Norway) NOR	Petter Christian Singsaas	14	0	3+8	0	1+1	0	0+1	0
4	DF	(Norway) NOR	Pål Lydersen	29	0	24	0	2+1	0	2	0
5	DF	(Norway) NOR	Knut Anders Fostervold	28	2	23	1	3	1	2	0
6	MF	(Norway) NOR	Daniel Berg Hestad	29	10	24	8	3	2	2	0
7	DF	(Iceland) ISL	Bjarki Gunnlaugsson	9	3	2+6	2	0+1	1	0	0
8	MF	(Norway) NOR	Karl Oskar Fjørtoft	30	3	25	3	3	0	2	0
9	MF	(Norway) NOR	Odd Inge Olsen	31	12	26	11	3	1	2	0
10	FW	(Norway) NOR	Andreas Lund	29	16	23+2	16	1+1	0	2	0
11	MF	(Norway) NOR	Trond Andersen	29	2	24	2	3	0	2	0
13	FW	(Norway) NOR	Geir Televik	15	2	0+12	2	1	0	0+2	0
14	DF	(Norway) NOR	Sindre Rekdal	4	1	2+2	1	0	0	0	0
15	DF	(Norway) NOR	Freddy dos Santos	26	0	17+5	0	2	0	2	0
17	DF	(Norway) NOR	Trond Strande	2	0	1+1	0	0	0	0	0
18	MF	(Norway) NOR	Ståle Rønningen	1	0	0+1	0	0	0	0	0
19	MF	(Norway) NOR	Anders Hasselgård	20	3	11+4	3	1+2	0	2	0
20	FW	(Norway) NOR	Ole Bjørn Sundgot	21	7	10+9	6	2	1	0	0
21	MF	(Norway) NOR	Stian Ohr	2	1	1+1	1	0	0	0	0
22	FW	(Norway) NOR	Jo Tessem	31	8	26	8	3	0	2	0
23	MF	(Norway) NOR	Thomas Mork	25	3	6+14	3	1+2	0	0+2	0
Players away from Molde on loan:
Players who left Molde during the season:

=== Goalscorers ===
Rank	Position	Nat.	No.	Player	Tippeligaen	Norwegian Cup	UEFA Cup	Total
1	FW	(Norway)	10	Andreas Lund	16	0	0	16
2	MF	(Norway)	9	Odd Inge Olsen	11	1	0	12
3	MF	(Norway)	6	Daniel Berg Hestad	8	2	0	10
4	FW	(Norway)	22	Jo Tessem	8	0	0	8
5	FW	(Norway)	20	Ole Bjørn Sundgot	6	1	0	7
6	MF	(Norway)	8	Karl Oskar Fjørtoft	3	0	0	3
6	MF	(Norway)	23	Thomas Mork	3	0	0	3
6	MF	(Norway)	19	Anders Hasselgård	3	0	0	3
6	DF	(Iceland)	7	Bjarki Gunnlaugsson	2	1	0	3
10	DF	(Sweden)	2	Dennis Schiller	2	0	0	2
10	MF	(Norway)	11	Trond Andersen	2	0	0	2
10	FW	(Norway)	13	Geir Televik	2	0	0	2
10	DF	(Norway)	5	Knut Anders Fostervold	1	1	0	2
14	DF	(Norway)	14	Sindre Rekdal	1	0	0	1
14	MF	(Norway)	21	Stian Ohr	1	0	0	1
				Own goal	1	0	0	1
				TOTALS	70	6	0	76

== See also ==
- Molde FK seasons
