= 2025 IL Hødd season =

Hødd
2025 season
- Chairman: Jan Arild Roppen
- Manager: Marius Bøe
- Stadium: Høddvoll
- 1. divisjon: 10th
- 2025 Norwegian Cup: Second round
- 2025–26 Norwegian Cup: Second round
- Top goalscorer: League: Isak Gabriel Skotheim (1); All: Isak Gabriel Skotheim (1)
Home colours	Away colours

The 2025 season is the 111th in the history of IL Hødd and their first season in the second tier of Norwegian football. The club will compete in the Norwegian First Division and the Norwegian Football Cup

== Friendlies ==
=== Pre-season ===
31 January 2025 Friendly	Hødd (Norway)	0–1	(Norway) Kristiansund
16:30

8 February 2025 Friendly	Aalesund (Norway)	1–1	(Norway) Hødd
16:00

18 February 2025 Friendly	Hødd (Norway)	1–1	(Georgia (country)) Torpedo Kutaisi
16:00

26 February 2025 Friendly	Sogndal (Norway)	1–2	(Norway) Hødd
13:00

1 March 2025 Friendly	Hødd (Norway)	2–1	(Norway) Brattvåg
14:00

8 March 2025 Friendly	Hødd (Norway)	1–2	(Norway) Træff
14:00

15 March 2025 Friendly	Hødd (Norway)	2–3	(Norway) Åsane
13:00

22 March 2025 Friendly	Lysekloster (Norway)	1–0	(Norway) Hødd
13:00

== Competitions ==
=== Overview ===
Competition	First match	Last match	Starting round	Final position	Record							
Competition	First match	Last match	Starting round	Final position	Pld	W	D	L	GF	GA	GD	Win %
Norwegian First Division	31 March 2025	8 November 2025	Matchday 1		4	1	1	2	3	5	−2	25.00
Norwegian Football Cup	13 April 2025	24 April 2025	First round	Second round	2	0	1	1	2	4	−2	0.00
Total					6	1	2	3	5	9	−4	16.67

Last updated: 29 April 2025
Source: Competitions

=== First Division ===
==== League table ====
Pos	Team	Pld	W	D	L	GF	GA	GD	Pts
8	Sogndal	30	12	7	11	49	48	+1	43
9	Odd	30	8	9	13	37	50	−13	33
10	Hødd	30	8	9	13	34	52	−18	33
11	Stabæk	30	7	10	13	45	53	−8	31
12	Åsane	30	7	10	13	38	53	−15	31

Source: OBOS-ligaen (in Norwegian)
Rules for classification: 1) Points; 2) Goal difference; 3) Goals scored; 4) Head-to-head points; 5) Head-to-head goal difference; 6) Head-to-head goals scored.

==== Results summary ====
Overall								Home						Away					
Pld	W	D	L	GF	GA	GD	Pts	W	D	L	GF	GA	GD	W	D	L	GF	GA	GD
4	1	1	2	3	5	−2	4	0	0	2	0	3	−3	1	1	0	3	2	+1

Last updated: 29 April 2025.
Source: NFF

==== Results by round ====
Round	1	2	3	4
Ground	A	H	A	H
Result	D	L	W	L
Position	8			

Updated to match(es) played on 29 April 2025. Source: NFF
A = Away; H = Home; W = Win; D = Draw; L = Loss

==== Matches ====
The league schedule was released on 20 December 2024.

31 March 2025 1	Stabæk	1–1	Hødd	Bekkestua
19:00	Diabaté 74'		Skotheim 49'	Stadium: Nadderud Stadion; Attendance: 2,507; Referee: Mischa Huru Kellerhals

5 April 2025 2	Hødd	0–2	Kongsvinger	Ulsteinvik
16:00 UTC+2			Dybevik 33'; Tangen Vinjor 90'	Stadium: Nye Høddvoll; Attendance: 1,357; Referee: Anders Bodding

21 April 2025 3	Start	1–2	Hødd	Kristiansand
17:00

29 April 2025 4	Hødd	0–1	Ranheim	Ulsteinvik
19:00				Stadium: Høddvoll

4 May 2025 5	Lyn	0–1	Hødd	Oslo
17:00

13 September 2025 22	Odd	1–2	Hødd

20 September 2025 23	Hødd	2–1	Moss

29 September 2025 24	Hødd	0–1	Lyn

4 October 2025 25	Lillestrøm	4–0	Hødd

18 October 2025 26	Hødd	3–3	Åsane

22 October 2025 27	Kongsvinger	3–0	Hødd

25 October 2025 28	Hødd	1–3	Stabæk

1 November 2025 29	Egersund	0–0	Hødd

8 November 2025 30	Hødd	0–0	Aalesund

=== Norwegian Football Cup ===
13 April 2025 First round	Brattvåg	1–1 (3–5 p)	Hødd
14:00

24 April 2025 Second round	Grorud	3–1	Hødd
17:30
