= 2003 Norwegian First Division =

1. divisjon
- Season: 2003
- Dates: 13 April – 1 November
- Champions: HamKam
- Promoted: HamKam; Fredrikstad
- Relegated: Bærum; Manglerud Star; Ørn-Horten; Alta
- Matches played: 240
- Goals scored: 820 (3.42 per match)
- Top goalscorer: Markus Ringberg (19 goals)

The 2003 1. divisjon season kicked off on 13 April 2003, and the final round was played on 1 November 2003.

Ham-Kam were promoted to the 2004 Tippeligaen as 1. divisjon winners, along with Fredrikstad who finished second. Ham-Kam will be playing in the top division for the first time since 1995, while Fredrikstad returned for the first time since 1975.

As in previous seasons, there was a two-legged promotion play-off at the end of the season, between the third-placed team in the 1. divisjon (Sandefjord) and the twelfth-placed team in the Tippeligaen (Vålerenga). Vålerenga kept their spot in the Tippeligaen, beating Sandefjord 5-3 on aggregate.

== League table ==
Pos	Team	Pld	W	D	L	GF	GA	GD	Pts	Promotion or relegation
1	HamKam (C, P)	30	19	6	5	60	29	+31	63	Promotion to Tippeligaen
2	Fredrikstad (P)	30	19	5	6	68	37	+31	62	Promotion to Tippeligaen
3	Sandefjord	30	19	4	7	71	41	+30	61	Qualification for the promotion play-offs
4	Raufoss	30	17	5	8	75	47	+28	56	
5	Hønefoss BK	30	16	7	7	55	41	+14	55	
6	Haugesund	30	13	10	7	53	42	+11	49	
7	Mandalskameratene	30	14	7	9	57	51	+6	49	
8	Skeid	30	13	6	11	46	47	−1	45	
9	Start	30	12	4	14	53	50	+3	40	
10	Strømsgodset	30	10	7	13	56	58	−2	37	
11	Hødd	30	9	8	13	51	54	−3	35	
12	Moss	30	8	11	11	34	39	−5	35	
13	Bærum (R)	30	7	6	17	34	58	−24	27	Relegation to Second Division
14	Oslo Øst (Note: Oslo Øst were deducted a total 2 points.) (R)	30	5	7	18	36	67	−31	20	Relegation to Second Division
15	Ørn-Horten (R)	30	5	5	20	40	83	−43	20	Relegation to Second Division
16	Alta (R)	30	3	4	23	31	76	−45	13	Relegation to Second Division

Source: nifs.no
Rules for classification: 1) points; 2) goal difference; 3) number of goals scored.
(C) Champions; (P) Promoted; (R) Relegated

== Results ==
Home \ Away	AIF	BÆR	FRE	HAM	FKH	ILH	HBK	MAN	MOS	ØST	RIL	SAN	SKD	IKS	SIF	ØRN
Alta	—	1–2	1–2	1–2	2–3	1–1	0–1	0–0	3–2	0–1	2–2	1–2	0–2	0–1	0–2	4–1
Bærum	2–0	—	1–1	0–1	0–0	1–3	1–2	0–1	3–3	2–1	2–0	1–4	2–2	2–0	1–2	3–2
Fredrikstad	1–3	4–0	—	4–1	3–2	4–1	2–1	4–0	3–1	4–1	3–0	1–3	2–0	2–1	1–1	3–0
HamKam	7–2	2–0	1–2	—	2–1	2–1	4–0	0–1	1–1	2–2	2–1	0–0	0–0	1–2	1–1	4–0
Haugesund	3–0	2–3	1–1	0–1	—	1–1	3–1	4–3	0–0	3–2	2–2	0–0	2–0	3–1	3–1	2–1
Hødd	6–0	2–0	2–2	0–1	2–4	—	2–1	1–1	2–2	2–0	1–2	4–2	2–2	5–2	3–2	3–0
Hønefoss	1–1	0–0	1–1	0–2	1–0	4–2	—	2–1	1–1	4–1	3–5	2–2	2–0	1–0	2–1	6–1
Mandalskameratene	2–1	2–0	1–2	1–6	2–2	1–0	1–2	—	2–2	3–1	2–3	0–4	2–1	1–0	3–3	6–2
Moss	2–1	2–1	1–0	0–2	1–1	2–1	2–2	0–1	—	2–0	0–1	1–1	0–1	2–1	2–1	1–1
Oslo Øst	2–0	1–1	2–5	0–1	1–1	1–1	1–3	1–3	0–0	—	1–4	2–4	0–1	5–4	0–1	1–0
Raufoss	3–1	3–0	2–1	2–2	4–1	5–0	2–2	1–2	0–1	5–3	—	1–2	4–1	1–3	2–2	4–3
Sandefjord	7–1	4–1	3–1	1–3	1–2	4–2	1–2	2–1	1–0	6–1	0–4	—	2–1	1–2	4–2	2–0
Skeid	4–2	2–1	4–0	1–4	3–1	1–0	1–4	2–2	2–1	0–0	2–1	1–2	—	1–1	1–2	6–2
Start	5–2	4–1	0–1	0–1	0–2	3–0	2–1	0–3	2–0	0–1	2–7	4–2	5–0	—	5–1	1–1
Strømsgodset	5–1	3–1	2–3	4–1	1–2	1–1	0–1	3–3	2–1	3–2	1–2	0–2	1–2	1–1	—	4–2
Ørn-Horten	2–0	4–2	0–5	1–3	2–2	2–0	1–2	2–6	2–1	2–2	0–2	0–2	0–2	1–1	5–3	—

Source: NIFS (in Norwegian)
Legend: Blue = home team win; Yellow = draw; Red = away team win.

== Top goalscorers ==
Rank	Scorer	Club	Goals
1	(Norway) Markus Ringberg	HamKam	19
2	(Norway) Christian Johnsen	Raufoss	17
3	(Iceland) Haraldur Ingólfsson	Raufoss	15
4	(England) Ben Wright	Start	13
4	(Norway) Geir Televik	Hødd	13
4	(Norway) Tom Helge Jacobsen	Sandefjord	13
