= Slettebø =

Slettebø is a Norwegian surname. Notable people with the surname include:

- Harald Bjarne Slettebø (1922–2018), Norwegian school worker and politician
- Ståle Slettebø (born 1964), Norwegian footballer
