= 2002 Tippeligaen =

58th season of top-tier football league in Norway

Tippeligaen
- Season: 2002
- Dates: 13 April – 27 October
- Champions: Rosenborg; 17th title
- Relegated: Moss; Start
- Champions League: Rosenborg
- UEFA Cup: Vålerenga; Molde; Lyn
- Matches: 182
- Goals: 545 (2.99 per match)
- Top goalscorer: Harald Martin Brattbakk (17 goals)
- Biggest home win: Lillestrøm 7–0 Start (25 August 2002)
- Biggest away win: Start 2–7 Vålerenga (16 June 2002); Start 1–6 Moss (29 September 2002)
- Highest scoring: Start 2–7 Vålerenga (16 June 2002)
- Longest winning run: 7 games Rosenborg
- Longest unbeaten run: 12 games Rosenborg; Viking
- Longest winless run: 11 games Start
- Longest losing run: 8 games Start
- Highest attendance: 20,739; Rosenborg 4–0 Brann (27 October 2002)
- Lowest attendance: 1,442; Start 0–3 Bodø/Glimt (27 October 2002)
- Average attendance: 6,203 ▲11.2%

The 2002 Tippeligaen was the 58th completed season of top division football in Norway.

Each team played 26 games with three points given for wins and one point for a draw. Number thirteen and fourteen are relegated, number twelve has to play two qualification matches (home and away) against number three in the 1. divisjon (where number one and two are directly promoted) for the last spot.

== Teams and locations ==
Locations of the teams in 2002 Tippeligaen

Note: Table lists in alphabetical order.

Team	Ap.	Location	Stadium
Bodø/Glimt	14	Bodø	Aspmyra Stadion
Brann	46	Bergen	Brann Stadion
Bryne	16	Bryne	Bryne Stadion
Lillestrøm	39	Lillestrøm	Åråsen Stadion
Lyn	29	Oslo	Ullevaal Stadion
Molde	27	Molde	Molde Stadion
Moss	22	Moss	Melløs Stadion
Odd Grenland	22	Skien	Odd Stadion
Rosenborg	39	Trondheim	Lerkendal Stadion
Sogndal	10	Sogndalsfjøra	Fosshaugane
Stabæk	8	Bærum	Nadderud Stadion
Start	30	Kristiansand	Kristiansand Stadion
Vålerenga	42	Oslo	Ullevaal Stadion
Viking	53	Stavanger	Stavanger Stadion

== League table ==
Pos	Team	Pld	W	D	L	GF	GA	GD	Pts	Qualification or relegation
1	Rosenborg (C)	26	17	5	4	57	30	+27	56	Qualification for the Champions League second qualifying round
2	Molde	26	15	5	6	48	26	+22	50	Qualification for the UEFA Cup qualifying round
3	Lyn	26	14	5	7	36	29	+7	47	Qualification for the UEFA Cup qualifying round
4	Viking	26	11	11	4	44	31	+13	44	
5	Stabæk	26	12	6	8	48	34	+14	42	
6	Odd Grenland	26	12	5	9	36	30	+6	41	
7	Lillestrøm	26	10	6	10	37	30	+7	36	
8	Vålerenga	26	7	12	7	38	31	+7	33	Qualification for the UEFA Cup first round (Note: Vålerenga qualified for the UEFA Cup first round as Norwegian Cup winners.)
9	Bryne	26	8	7	11	38	39	−1	31	
10	Bodø/Glimt	26	9	4	13	38	41	−3	31	
11	Sogndal	26	8	6	12	37	51	−14	30	
12	Brann (O)	26	8	3	15	35	52	−17	27	Qualification for the relegation play-offs
13	Moss (R)	26	6	6	14	32	49	−17	24	Relegation to First Division
14	Start (R)	26	2	5	19	21	72	−51	11	Relegation to First Division

Source: fotball.no
Rules for classification: 1) points; 2) goal difference; 3) number of goals scored.
(C) Champions; (O) Play-off winners; (R) Relegated

== Relegation play-offs ==
Brann won the play-offs against Sandefjord 2–1 on aggregate.

2 November 2002
12:50 CET (UTC+1)

Sandefjord	0–0	Brann
	Report

Storstadion, Sandefjord
Attendance: 6,516
Referee: Roy Helge Olsen

6 November 2002
18:30 CET (UTC+1)

Brann	2–1	Sandefjord
Knarvik 44'; Furuseth 72'	Report	Jacobsen 90'

Brann Stadion, Bergen
Attendance: 10,788
Referee: Tom Henning Øvrebø

== Results ==
Home \ Away	BOD	BRA	BRY	LIL	LYN	MOL	MOS	ODD	ROS	SOG	STB	IKS	VÅL	VIK
Bodø/Glimt	—	0–1	4–0	0–1	0–2	0–2	2–0	1–3	1–4	2–1	2–0	2–0	2–2	0–0
Brann	1–3	—	1–2	1–2	1–1	4–1	0–1	1–3	2–3	2–3	4–1	3–1	0–4	2–3
Bryne	4–3	4–0	—	1–1	0–1	0–2	0–0	0–0	2–1	3–0	2–1	3–1	2–2	3–3
Lillestrøm	2–0	0–1	2–1	—	0–1	0–2	1–1	3–0	0–1	3–0	1–2	7–0	1–1	2–0
Lyn	3–1	2–3	1–0	2–0	—	3–1	0–1	3–0	2–3	1–0	2–0	1–0	1–0	0–1
Molde	3–0	2–0	2–1	0–0	2–0	—	5–1	0–0	1–2	3–3	1–0	2–0	2–0	3–0
Moss	1–0	0–1	1–0	0–2	0–2	2–3	—	0–1	2–2	3–3	2–7	0–2	1–1	2–2
Odd Grenland	2–3	2–0	3–1	3–1	1–1	1–1	2–0	—	1–3	4–2	1–1	2–0	1–3	2–0
Rosenborg	4–3	4–0	3–2	3–1	5–1	3–0	2–0	0–1	—	3–0	2–1	4–2	1–1	0–2
Sogndal	0–2	2–3	3–2	5–2	2–2	2–1	0–4	1–0	2–2	—	2–0	0–0	2–0	0–2
Stabæk	2–1	1–0	2–1	1–1	5–0	4–2	3–2	1–0	0–0	4–0	—	5–2	0–0	1–2
Start	0–3	2–2	0–2	0–2	2–2	0–4	1–6	2–0	1–2	0–3	1–1	—	2–7	1–1
Vålerenga	1–1	1–1	1–1	1–1	1–2	0–3	3–1	2–0	0–0	2–0	0–2	4–0	—	0–0
Viking	2–2	4–1	1–1	3–1	0–0	0–0	4–1	0–3	2–0	1–1	3–3	4–1	4–1	—

Source: NIFS (in Norwegian)
Legend: Blue = home team win; Yellow = draw; Red = away team win.

== Season statistics ==
=== Top scorers ===
Rank	Player	Club	Goals
1	(Norway) Harald Martin Brattbakk	Rosenborg	17
2	(Iceland) Tryggvi Guðmundsson	Stabæk	16
3	(Norway) Bengt Sæternes	Bodø/Glimt	12
4	(Norway) Erik Nevland	Viking	10
5	(Norway) Bernt Hulsker	Molde	9
5	(Sweden) Dejan Pavlovic	Bryne	9
5	(Germany) Uwe Rösler	Lillestrøm	9
5	(Norway) André Schei Lindbæk	Molde	9
9	(Norway) Håvard Flo	Sogndal	8
9	(Norway) Øyvind Storflor	Moss	8
9	(Norway) Ole Bjørn Sundgot	Lyn	8

=== Attendances ===
Pos	Team	Total	High	Low	Average	Change
1	Rosenborg	190,134	20,739	9,760	14,626	+21.2%
2	Brann	143,087	18,172	8,177	11,007	−12.6%
3	Vålerenga	113,907	18,374	4,256	8,762	n/a^{1}
4	Viking	97,593	11,820	5,670	7,507	−4.8%
5	Lillestrøm	92,274	13,652	4,319	7,098	+6.3%
6	Molde	80,511	11,167	4,303	6,193	−6.2%
7	Lyn	73,842	20,574	2,071	5,680	+35.2%
8	Odd Grenland	70,848	8,523	4,015	5,450	+7.9%
9	Start	56,712	8,876	1,442	4,362	n/a^{1}
10	Stabæk	48,744	6,177	2,738	3,750	−11.3%
11	Bodø/Glimt	45,651	5,364	2,702	3,512	−8.4%
12	Bryne	43,548	6,250	2,475	3,350	+13.4%
13	Moss	39,599	4,432	1,960	3,046	+11.6%
14	Sogndal	32,531	5,173	1,605	2,502	+9.6%
	League total	1,128,981	20,739	1,442	6,203	+11.2%

Source: nifs.no
Notes:
1: Team played last season in 1. divisjon.
