= Even Blakstad =

Norwegian footballer (born 1968)

Personal information
- Date of birth: 1 January 1968 (age 58)
- Position: Defender

Youth career
- Batnfjord
- 1984–1987: Molde

Senior career*
Years	Team	Apps	(Gls)
1987–1988	Molde	1	(0)
1989–1991	Kristiansund		
1992–1997	Hødd		
2002–2005	Ottestad		

Managerial career
- 2003–2005: Ottestad
- * Club domestic league appearances and goals

Even Blakstad (born 1 January 1968) is a retired Norwegian footballer who played as a defender. After playing very briefly in Norway's highest league with Molde FK, Blakstad spent the majority of his career in IL Hødd and reached Eliteserien with them as well. He is the father of Julie Blakstad.

== Early life ==
He hails from Batnfjordsøra. He joined the youth team of Molde FK in 1984, and crowned his time there by winning the 1987 Norwegian Youth Cup. When he was young, Blakstad also took an electrician's training and education.

== Career ==
Blakstad was promoted to Molde FK's senior squad from their youth ranks in 1988. Missing most of the 1988 season due to injury; already the next season he returned to Nordmøre and signed for Kristiansund FK. Managed by Erik Brakstad, the team won promotion to the 1990 Norwegian Second Division. After two years at Kristiansund, Molde tried to contend that the transfer was really a loan, and wanted the player back, but this did not happen.

Blakstad was the team captain. Kristiansund FK played on the second tier, but was relegated in 1991. Kristiansund FK wanted to re-sign him, but he instead joined IL Hødd for the 1992 season, having also been wanted by Averøykameratene. He became captain here as well, praising the fact that the population of Ulsteinvik gathered to support one single team–as opposed to the situation in Kristiansund city. In 1993, Blakstad was crowned as Player of the Year by local newspaper Vikebladet Vestposten.

Having been doubtful for Hødd's 1994 1. divisjon campaign, he made the choice to continue in the team, The season became highly successful as Hødd achieved promotion to the highest level. He missed 10 weeks of their pre-season due to injury, but managed to finish his reconvalescence in April 1995.

In addition to Hødd contesting the highest league after a long absence, the 1995 team managed to reach the semi-final of the Norwegian Football Cup for the first time ever. Even Blakstad scored from a repost as Hødd eliminated Hamkam in the quarter-final. He continued in Hødd after their relegation from the 1995 Norwegian top division.

After the 1996 season, Kristiansund FK wanted to recruit Even Blakstad and Ole Gunnar Iversen as joint managers. At the same time, Hødd struggled financially after failing re-promotion to the Eliteserien. There were rumours of Hødd unilaterally cutting the player wages, and if this became a reality, Blakstad considered making the move. In the end, his contract remained the same, and he turned down Kristiansund's offer.

In 1997 he survived a head-on car crash together with teammate Trond Helgesen near the golf court in Hjørungavåg. In the fall of 1997, Blakstad was also said to move to Haugesund and possibly start playing for FK Haugesund. SK Vard Haugesund were interested as well. This did not happen, and Blakstad instead stopped playing.

As Blakstad moved to Bekkelaget outside Hamar in 2001, he ended a five-year hiatus from football as he made a comeback for local club Ottestad IL in 2002. He also started managing the team in the 2003 season, leaving in late 2005.

== Personal life ==
Even Blakstad's sister Britt-Torill Blakstad played 11 times for Norway U16, and played club football for Byåsen among others. Even Blakstad's daughter Julie Blakstad eventually became a professional footballer. She started her youth career in Ottestad IL before moving to gradually bigger clubs, and was capped for Norway.
