= Diegol =

Brazilian footballer (born 1985)

Personal information
- Full name: Diego Leonardo Silva Soares Pereira
- Date of birth: November 11, 1985 (age 40)
- Place of birth: Teresina, Brazil
- Height: 1.88 m (6 ft 2 in)
- Position: Striker

Team information
- Current team: IL Hødd
- Number: 10

Youth career
- 2000–2007: Vasco da Gama

Senior career*
Years	Team	Apps	(Gls)
2007	Huracán Buceo	9	(7)
2007–present	→ IL Hødd (loan)	5	(8)
- * Club domestic league appearances and goals

Diego Leonardo Silva Soares Pereira (born 11 November 1985, better known as Diegol) is a brazilian professional football player.

== Club career ==
Diegol, made his debut when 15 years old in the under 15 team of Vasco da Gama in Brazil, and played as a forwarder in the under 20 team and he arrived to the top and professional team with the title of best striker of all the base divisions of the club.

Diego never played in Vasco da Gama as an important player because this forwarder had his rights as a player bought by an important football investor group and he traveled to Uruguay to play in CSD Huracán Buceo and after that to IL Hødd Fotball, in Norway.

Diegol, when he played in the under 17 Vasco da Gama team, played in a pre-season with the Brazilian under 17 national team.
