= Jan Kokkim =

Norwegian footballer (born 1973)

Personal information
- Date of birth: 30 January 1973 (age 53)
- Position: Forward

Youth career
- Grorud
- Vålerenga

College career
Years	Team	Apps	(Gls)
1998–2001	Lynn Fighting Knights		

Senior career*
Years	Team	Apps	(Gls)
1993–1995	Vålerenga		
1995	→ Strømsgodset (loan)		
1996–1997	Drøbak-Frogn		
1998–1999	Manglerud Star		
2000–2003	Oslo Øst		
2003–2005	Mercantile		
2006–2007	Grorud		

International career
1994	Norway U21	1	(0)
- * Club domestic league appearances and goals

Jan Kokkim (born 1973) is a retired Norwegian footballer who played as a forward or left winger.

Hailing from the neighbourhood Romsås, Kokkim grew up in the Oslo East club Grorud IL, He also played youth ice hockey for Furuset IF.

Kokkim joined Vålerenga as a youth player. Scoring for the senior team in a friendly match in 1992, he was promoted to their first team in 1993. Vålerenga won promotion from the 1993 1. divisjon, and Kokkim played in the 1994 Eliteserien. In 1994 he also got his only international cap, featuring for Norway U21.

In 1995, Kokkim was loaned to 1. divisjon promotion contenders Strømsgodset. In a pre-season friendly against Asker, Kokkim was elbowed, lost consciousness and was diagnosed with a concussion at Aker Hospital. In August 1995, Kokkim was himself sent off—having punched an opponent who pushed him. Having failed to establish himself as a regular first-team player, Kokkim was rescinded by Strømsgodset at the end of 1995. He soon started training with Drøbak-Frogn.

However, Kokkim's transfer soon became central in a historic dispute between Vålerenga and other clubs. First, there was a dispute between Vålerenga and Strømsgodset that stretched into 1996. Vålerenga did not want Kokkim anymore, and claimed that Strømsgodset had excised an option to buy Kokkim for 60,000 kr. On the other hand, Strømsgodset claimed that the club had sent Kokkim as the loan expired. In any event, Kokkim had moved on to Drøbak-Frogn for free, but Vålerenga contended that this was Strømsgodset's choice and demanded 60,000 from Strømsgodset. To compound the issue further, Juro Kuvicek had gone the opposite way, with Vålerenga buying him from Strømsgodset for about 125,000 kr. The Oslo club refused to pay the full sum, wanting to withhold the 60,000 for Kokkim. Amid the confusion, all the correct forms were not submitted for Kuvicek's transfer. In turn, another club Kongsvinger protested the 1–1 outcome in a league match against Vålerenga. The Football Association found Kuvicek "not eligible" in that match, awarding three points to Kongsvinger and none to Vålerenga, which in the end meant that Vålerenga suffered relegation from the 1996 Eliteserien.

After Drøbak-Frogn suffered relegation from the 1997 1. divisjon, Kokkim and teammate Finn-Georg Tomulevski left, and started training with Manglerud Star. The duo then went to the United States and played collegiately for the Lynn Fighting Knights; during summer breaks they would continue playing competitively in Norway. When Manglerud Star was a part of a merger that created the club FK Oslo Øst in 2000, the duo continued there.

In the summer of 2003 Kokkim moved from FK Oslo Øst to neighbours Mercantile SFK. In 2006 he rejoined his childhood club Grorud. He finally left Grorud after the 2007 season.
