= Nye Høddvoll =

Norwegian football stadium

Høddvoll
- Interactive map of Høddvoll
- Location: Ulsteinvik, Norway
- Coordinates: 62°20′23″N 5°52′53″E
- Owner: Ulstein Municipality
- Operator: IL Hødd
- Capacity: 4,081
- Surface: Artificial Grass
- Record attendance: 3,003
- Field size: 105 × 68 m

Construction
- Groundbreaking: 2014
- Opened: 13 April 2015
- Cost: NOK 46,5 million

Tenant
- IL Hødd (2015–present)

Høddvoll, also known as Nye Høddvoll (lit. 'New Høddvoll'), is a football stadium located in Ulsteinvik, Norway, and is the home of 2. divisjon club Hødd. The stadium has a current capacity of 4,081 spectators.

== History ==
The old stadium, Høddvoll Stadion, did not meet the criteria for First Division stadia, lacking such amenities as under-soil heating, floodlights and the necessary standard for locker rooms. The club is therefore working on plans to build an all-new stadium at the site of the training pitch—the site of the first stadium from 1921. The new venue will feature a main stand on the north long side and artificial turf. The project is estimated to cost NOK 50 million. The main stand will feature 1,950 seated places, the opposite, south stand will feature 875 seated places, and the eastern stand will feature standing places for 1,000 spectators, for a total of 3,825. The west end will be built as part of Høddvoll Panorama, which combines commercial estate in the ground floor and eighteen apartments in the upper two stories. The new venue is certified for Eliteserien and UEFA matches. Hødd will rent the stadium from the municipality for NOK 2.5 million per year.

The main stand will be built in conjunction with Ulsteinhallen, and will feature common locker rooms and cafeteria. The indoor arena will feature a hall area for athletics, handball and gymnastics, with Dimna IL as the main tenant. Both Ulsteinhallen and the new stadium will be owned by Ulstein Eigedomsselskap KF, a municipal enterprise owned by Ulstein Municipality. The municipality estimates that the hall will cost between one and a half and two million kroner per year to operate. Møre og Romsdal County Municipality secured 47.6 percent of the investment costs and 37.6 percent of the operating costs of the new hall, to allow it to be used by Ulstein Upper Secondary School. This will give the school access to 1,000 square meters (11,000 sq ft) of new floor space and daytime access to the 6,400-square-meter (69,000 sq ft) athletics hall. Construction commenced in December 2012, with Nord-Berg as the main contractor. The arena's scheduled completion was in 2014, when it would become the third-largest indoor athletics arena in Norway, costing a total of NOK 123 million.

The stadium was officially opened on 13 April 2015 with a game Hødd and Fredrikstad drew 1–1. In 2018, the stadium was used by NRK as set for the TV series Heimebane.

== Attendance ==
The record attendance at Høddvoll is 3,003 spectators dates from 20 April 2015, a 2015 1. divisjon game Hødd won 3–0 against Brann.

== See also ==
- Høddvoll Stadion
- Nye Høddvoll - Nordic Stadiums
