= Per-Ivar Steinbakk =

Norwegian footballer (born 1974)

Personal information
- Date of birth: 15 May 1974 (age 52)
- Height: 1.80 m (5 ft 11 in)
- Position: Midfielder

Youth career
- –1994: Bodø/Glimt

Senior career*
Years	Team	Apps	(Gls)
1995–1997	Bodø/Glimt	60	(4)
1998–1999	Narvik FK		
2000−2001	Lofoten		
2002	Lørenskog		
2003–2004	Bodø/Glimt	30	
- Innstranden
- * Club domestic league appearances and goals

Per-Ivar Steinbakk (born 15 May 1974) is a retired Norwegian football defender.

He came through the junior ranks of FK Bodø/Glimt into the first team in 1995. Playing about half the games in three Eliteserien seasons, he joined lowly Narvik FK in 1998. He played second-tier football for FK Lofoten and Lørenskog IF before taking a second spell in Bodø/Glimt, and finishing his career in local minnows Innstrandens IL.
