= Iver Sletten =

Norwegian footballer (born 1974)

Personal information
- Date of birth: 24 July 1974 (age 52)
- Height: 1.86 m (6 ft 1 in)
- Position: Striker

Youth career
- Vestsida

Senior career*
Years	Team	Apps	(Gls)
–1993	Vestsida		
1993–1995	Ham Kam 2		
1995–1997	Ham Kam		
1998–2001	Skeid	85	(21)
2002	Bærum		
2003–2004	Groruddalen		(34)
- * Club domestic league appearances and goals

Iver Sletten (born 24 July 1974) is a retired Norwegian football striker.

== Career ==
Sletten hails from Vinstra and started his career in local club Vestsida FK. He played senior football in the Fourth Division, scoring 18 goals in 1992. After the 1992 season, he and another teammate trained with Leeds United F.C. Under-21s and Academy. In the fall of 1993 he wanted to move to Hamar, and play for the B team of Hamarkameratene. He scored twice in his last match for Vestsida. He continued as a member of the Hamarkameratene 2 squad in 1994. The team played in the Third Division. Sletten lost nine weeks of training due to ankle surgery in January 1994, but experienced a breakthrough in May 1994, when he scored the winning goals against Sel away. In the second leg against Sel, in August, Sletten scored 4 times.

Sletten was included in Hamarkameratene's squad in 1995, contesting the Eliteserien. He scored his first Eliteserien goal against Kongsvinger, although it was inconsequential as Hamkam was already down 0–4. He made a breakthrough in October 1995, when he scored the winning goal against Vålerenga (in the 90th minute). The victory gave Hamkam hopes of narrowly avoiding relegation.

After three seasons in Hamarkameratene he joined Skeid Fotball ahead of the 1997 season. In his first tryout match for Skeid, Sletten scored a hat-trick. He also had a trial with Moss FK in late 1997.

Skeid had been relegated from the 1997 Eliteserien, but Sletten helped the team win re-promotion to the 1999 Eliteserien. He remained in the club despite a 20% pay cut in the summer of 1998.

In 2002, he played for Bærum SK. Here, he met the teammate (and future manager) Pål Arne Johansen, who lured Sletten to Groruddalen BK in 2003. Sletten and Groruddalen proved to be dominant in the 2003 3. divisjon. Among others, he scored 5 goals in one match against Nittedal. In June, he scored 11 goals in four matches. By 1 August, he was behind 21 goals. Groruddalen was one of Norway's most scoring teams, but failed to win promotion. Following a shoulder surgery, Sletten was wanted by Skjetten SK, Strømmen IF and Drøbak-Frogn, but chose to stay in Groruddalen—where he became team captain. He was not able to repeat his 25 league goals from 2003, stopping at 9 in 2004.

== Personal life ==
Sletten was a Liverpool F.C. supporter. He married Anne Stine Kraabøl, who received attention for the couple's maximalist home interior.
