= Finn-Georg Tomulevski =

Norwegian footballer (born 1975)

Finn-Georg Tomulevski (born 24 January 1975) is a retired Norwegian football defender.

He came through the junior ranks at Lillestrøm SK and was officially drafted into the first-team squad in 1995, but his recorded league game came the autumn before, in 1994.

He was dropped from Lillestrøm and signed by second-tier club Drøbak-Frogn IL. He played there in 1996 and 1997. In 1998 he eventually joined Manglerud-Star, playing for them and their successor FK Oslo Øst through 2004. He later featured for Grorud IL.
