= Terje Høsøien =

Norwegian footballer (born 1974)

Personal information
- Date of birth: 14 February 1974 (age 52)
- Position: Midfielder

Youth career
- Strindheim

Senior career*
Years	Team	Apps	(Gls)
–2000	Strindheim		
2001−2003	Moss	40	(4)
2004−2005	Strindheim		

International career
1991	Norway under-17	2	(0)
1992	Norway under-18	3	(0)
- * Club domestic league appearances and goals

Terje Høsøien (born 14 February 1974) is a retired Norwegian football midfielder.

He played youth football for Strindheim and also won Norway international youth caps. In 1995 Strindheim contested the highest league, but was relegated.

Strindheim then languished in the Norwegian First Division, but Høsøien scored the winning goal when Strindheim shockingly eliminated Rosenborg from the 2000 Norwegian Football Cup. In 2001 he left Strindheim to return to the top tier, signing for Moss FK. In 2004 he returned to Strindheim as a key player, now on the third tier.
