= Markus Ringberg =

Swedish football player (born 1976)

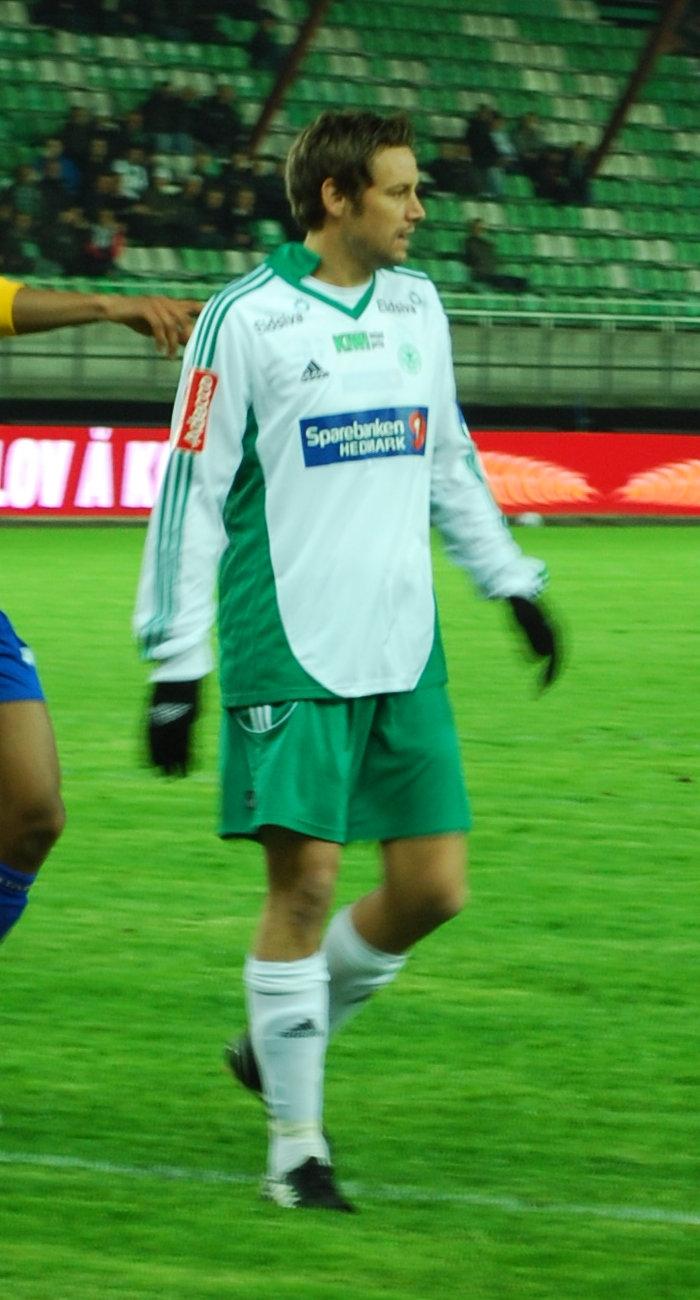
- Markus Ringberg in April 2009

Personal information
- Full name: Leif Thomas Markus Ringberg
- Date of birth: 5 May 1976 (age 50)
- Place of birth: Mjällby, Sweden
- Height: 1.90 m (6 ft 3 in)
- Position: Striker

Team information
- Current team: Express
- Number: 21

Senior career*
Years	Team	Apps	(Gls)
2003–2005	Fredrikstad	69	(34)
2005–2009	Ham-Kam	105	(27)
2009–2010	Moss	26	(5)
2010	Kvik Halden	9	(8)
2011–2012	Kråkerøy		
2013–2015	Mysen		
2016–2018	Gresvik		
2018–	Express		
- * Club domestic league appearances and goals as of 2 October 2013

Markus Ringberg (born 5 May 1976) is a Swedish football player who plays for IL Express. (Note: Markus Ringberg at the Norwegian Football Federation (in Norwegian))

== Club career ==
He was born in Mjällby.

His most notable achievements came at his time in Fredrikstad FK where he was one of the main contributors in taking the club from the Norwegian Second Division to the Norwegian Premier League in just two seasons. After scoring a brace of goals in the campaign for reinstatement in the premiership he was named captain of the side for two seasons in the Norwegian top flight.

He was sold to Hamarkameratene in the summer of 2005. This caused some FFK fans to come together in a 200-man strong demonstration outside the FFK's clubhouse demanding the heads of those responsible for the controversial sale of Ringberg. Ringberg himself wept at the press conference where he announced his departure from the club. Although his scoring prowess was not at its peak during his last two seasons with FFK he still remains one of the club's strongest former players.

He later joined Moss FK. In mid-2010 he joined Kvik Halden FK.

== Career statistics ==
Season	Club	Division	League		Cup		Total	
Season	Club	Division	Apps	Goals	Apps	Goals	Apps	Goals
2003	Fredrikstad	1. divisjon	30	20	3	4	33	24
2004	Fredrikstad	Tippeligaen	26	11	3	2	29	13
2005	Fredrikstad	Tippeligaen	13	3	3	4	16	7
2005	Ham-Kam	Tippeligaen	13	4	1	0	14	4
2006	Ham-Kam	Tippeligaen	25	5	2	0	27	5
2007	Ham-Kam	1. divisjon	27	10	0	0	27	10
2008	Ham-Kam	Tippeligaen	23	3	2	1	25	4
2009	Ham-Kam	1. divisjon	17	5	1	0	13	5
2009	Moss	1. divisjon	10	3	0	0	10	3
2010	Moss	1. divisjon	16	2	3	0	19	2
2010	Kvik Halden	3. divisjon	9	8	0	0	9	8
2011	Kråkerøy	4. divisjon	4	4	0	0	4	4
2012	Kråkerøy	4. divisjon	2	3	0	0	2	3
2013	Mysen	4. divisjon	19	9	0	0	19	9
Career Total			234	90	18	11	252	101
