= Stein Motrøen =

Norwegian footballer (born 1973)

Personal information
- Date of birth: 13 June 1973 (age 53)
- Position: Midfielder

Youth career
- Tynset

Senior career*
| Years | Team | Apps | (Gls) |
| −1994 | Tynset | | |
| 1994−1998 | Lyn | 79 | (7) |
| 1999 | Byåsen | 26 | (5) |
| 2000−? | Tynset | | |
- * Club domestic league appearances and goals

Stein Motrøen (born 13 June 1973) is a retired Norwegian football midfielder.

He hails from Tynset Municipality and started his career in Tynset IF. In August 1994 he made his debut for Lyn, recording that one game, but played the majority of the games from 1995 to 1998, including 15 games in the 1997 Norwegian Premier League. For his next club Byåsen he was ever-present in the 1999 Norwegian First Division, before making a comeback in Tynset in 2000.
