= Tom Helge Jacobsen =

Norwegian footballer

Personal information
- Date of birth: 1 September 1971 (age 55)
- Positions: Striker; winger

Youth career
- Stag
- Larvik Turn
- 1989–1990: FC Twente

Senior career*
Years	Team	Apps	(Gls)
1988–1991	Larvik Turn		
1991	Fram		
1991	Start 2		
1992–1994	Fram		
1995−1996	Eik-Tønsberg		
1997–1999	Odd	50	(8)
1999–2004	Sandefjord	135	(34)

Managerial career
- 2006: Sandefjord 2
- 2007−2008: FK Larvik
- 2009: Norway U17 women (assistant)
- 2010: Larvik Turn (developer)
- 2011–2013: Fram
- 2019–: Sandefjord (developer)
- * Club domestic league appearances and goals

Tom Helge Jacobsen (born 1 September 1971) is a Norwegian footballer who played as a forward. He played in the 1999 Eliteserien for Odd Grenland, and was also known from stints in the First Division with Eik-Tønsberg and Sandefjord. Jacobsen later became a manager.

== Early career ==
Jacobsen hails from Stavern. In 1989 he was invited to train with FC Twente during the easter, facilitated by Hallvar Thoresen. In the summer, he then signed a six-month apprenticeship contract, in part training under Eddy Achterberg. He returned to Larvik Turn in 1990, only to move on to neighbors IF Fram ahead of the 1991 season.

Jacobsen activated a clause in his contract which let him move for free to a first-tier club. Jacobsen felt unmotivated playing in the Third Division after returning from the Netherlands, and was looking to finish his schooling at Vågsbygd in Kristiansand. He joined IK Start from Larvik Turn in the autumn of 1991, but soon moved back to Fram.

== Elite career ==
As the 1994 season was nearing a close, and staying in Fram was out of the question, Jacobsen was wanted by Odds BK, Sandefjord BK and Eik-Tønsberg. He signed for the Tønsberg team and made a mark in the 1. divisjon.

His first hat-trick came in June 1996. He then spent three seasons in Odd and five seasons in Sandefjord.

The transfer to Odd was announced in November 1996. The fee was 125,000 kr, somewhat cheaper than Bengt Sæternes who would play alongside Jacobsen in attack. In Odd, Jacobsen was mainly known for his speed, and was called "lynvingen", literally "the lightning winger", but also the former Norwegian name of Batman. He was the fastest on the team as measured by 40 metre dashes, and according to Hallvar Thoresen he was also among the fastest footballers in Norway.

His start to the 1997 season was marred by a stress fracture in his left shin. Following more injuries sustained during the autumn, his performances in the 1997 season were deemed as below-par. In 1998 he would form a trio with Håvard Sakariassen and Tor Gunnar Johnsen. Odd managed to win promotion from the 1998 1. divisjon, contesting the 1999 Eliteserien. Jacobsen's only Eliteserien goal came against Stabæk in July 1999, where he first scored after an assist from Frode Johnsen before the roles were reversed and Jacobsen assisted Johnsen. The performance against Stabæk postponed a move away from Odd, which has been considered, and finally took place shortly before the summer transfer deadline. Jacobsen was signed by Sandefjord to play as a striker and help win promotion from the 1999 2. divisjon.

In his first full season in Sandefjord, the team struggled in the 2000 First Division and found themselves below the relegation line. In a key match against another lowly-placed team Byåsen, Jacobsen scored two goals (as did Jørgen Jalland) in a 5–3 victory that lifted Sandefjord above the relegation zone. Jacobsen was captain at the time. Sandefjord then became a contender for promotion, with Jacobsen participating in back-to-back Eliteserien playoffs. In 2002, he scored against Brann, but Sandefjord lost. In 2003, facing Vålerenga, he missed a major goalscoring opportunity in the first leg which ended 0–0. The second leg became a classic where Sandefjord held Vålerenga to 3–3, looking to win on the away goals rule, but this only lasted until the 84th minute whereafter Vålerenga scored two quick goals—while Sandefjord had two disallowed goals during the match.

== Managerial career ==
Jacobsen started a coaching career in 2006 for Sandefjord's B team. Sandefjord Fotball had had no B team since its inception, In an editorial comment on the story, Sandefjords Blad called Jacobsen "the right man at the right time".

From 2007 he coached women's team FK Larvik. In 2009 he became assistant coach for Norway under-17, and in 2010 player developer for Larvik Turn. From 2011 to 2013 he was the head coach of IF Fram. In 2013 he expressed disdain towards how the club was run, voicing his interest to take over Sandefjord should the club make an inquiry. In 2019 he joined Sandefjord as a player developer.

== Personal life ==
While playing for Eik-Tønsberg and Odd, he resided at Vear and followed a teacher's education at Vestfold University College. He later moved to Larvik. He was married and had his first child in 1999.
