= Per Olav Sætre =

Norwegian footballer (born 1977)

Personal information
- Date of birth: 13 March 1977 (age 49)
- Height: 1.76 m (5 ft 9 in)
- Position: Midfielder

Youth career
- Sykkylven

Senior career*
Years	Team	Apps	(Gls)
- Sykkylven
1995–1998	Molde	7	(0)
1998	→ Aalesund (loan)		
1999	Hødd		
2000–2002	Strindheim		

International career
1992	Norway U15	6	(0)
1993	Norway U16	1	(0)
1994	Norway U17	3	(0)
1996–1997	Norway U20	2	(0)
1998	Norway U21	1	(0)
- * Club domestic league appearances and goals

Per Olav Sætre (born 13 March 1977) is a retired Norwegian football midfielder.

He started his career in FK Sykkylven and represented Norway as a youth international. Picked up by Molde FK, he made his Eliteserien debut in September 1995. Playing very sparingly, he was loaned out to Aalesund in 1998 and moved to Hødd in 1999. From 2000 to 2002 he played for Strindheim in Trondheim.
