= Kenneth Karlsen =

Norwegian footballer and executive (born 1973)

Personal information
- Full name: Kenneth Widemann Karlsen
- Date of birth: 29 June 1973 (age 53)
- Place of birth: Drammen, Norway
- Height: 1.89 m (6 ft 2 1/2 in)
- Position: Defender

Team information
- Current team: Åssiden (manager)

Senior career*
Years	Team	Apps	(Gls)
1992–2006	Strømsgodset	245	(27)
2000	→ Widzew Łódź (loan)	4	(0)
2006–2010	Mjøndalen		
2013	Åssiden		

Managerial career
- 2009: Mjøndalen (assistant coach)
- 2010–2020: Mjøndalen (managing director)
- 2023–: Åssiden
- * Club domestic league appearances and goals

Kenneth Widemann Karlsen (born 29 June 1973) is a Norwegian football executive, manager and former player. He is currently in charge of Åssiden.

He made his debut for Strømsgodset in 1992 and retired in late summer 2006. His only time away from Strømsgodset was a 2000 loan at Widzew Łódź in what was the Norwegian off-season. After the spell at Widzew Łódź, Karlsen was on trial at PAS Giannina in December 2000.

Near the very end of the 2006 season he came out of retirement to help Mjøndalen IF climb the league tier, making his debut in an 11–0 thrashing of Hønefoss SK and securing a playoff to the 2. divisjon, which they won. Karlsen continued featuring for Mjøndalen until 2010, also making a brief comeback for fifth-tier Åssiden IF in 2013. Karlsen worked in Buskerud District of Football, but became more tied to Mjøndalen in 2009 as playing assistant manager. From 2010 he was hired as their managing director. His time was crowned with promotion to the 2015 Eliteserien as well as promotion and survival of the 2019 Eliteserien.

In 2026 he entered the board of directors of Strømsgodset.
