= Magnus Aasbrenn =

Norwegian footballer (born 1973)

Personal information
- Date of birth: 10 November 1973 (age 52)
- Place of birth: Norway
- Height: 1.77 m (5 ft 10 in)
- Position: Defender

Youth career
- Fu/Vo
- Lillestrøm

Senior career*
| Years | Team | Apps | (Gls) |
| 1994 | Lillestrøm | | |
| 1995−1999 | Lyn | 74 | (1) |
- * Club domestic league appearances and goals

Magnus Aasbrenn (born 10 November 1973) is a Norwegian former footballer who played as a defender.

He started his career in Fu/Vo, and after a time in Lillestrøm's youth setup he was promoted to the first team in 1994. From 1995 to 1999 he played for Lyn, bagging 23 games in the 1997 Norwegian Premier League.
