= Geir Hasund =

Norwegian footballer (born 1971)

Personal information
- Full name: Geir Hasund
- Date of birth: 3 July 1971 (age 55)
- Place of birth: Norway
- Positions: Midfielder; striker

Senior career*
Years	Team	Apps	(Gls)
1987–1992	Hødd		(81)
1993	Viking	14	(4)
1994–1998	Brann	84	(20)
1998	Åsane		

International career
1986	Norway u-16	8	(3)
1987	Norway u-17	5	(0)
1988	Norway u-18	2	(0)
1991	Norway u-21	9	(3)
- * Club domestic league appearances and goals

Geir Hasund (born 3 July 1971) is a former Norwegian football player that played as an offensive midfielder or forward at Hødd, Viking and Brann. He was capped for Norway at U21-level.

== Career ==
After playing for Hødd, like his father Kjetil Hasund did, he became top goalscorer in the 1992 1. divisjon with 24 goals, 8 of which came in a single match against SK Haugar. Hasund moved to Viking in 1993 where he made his debut in Tippeligaen. His chances in Viking were limited, and after only one season at the club he was brought to Brann by Anders Giske.

While playing for Brann, Hasund scored a number of extremely important goals. In the second leg of the semi-finals of the 1995 Norwegian Football Cup against Lillestrøm Hasund scored the last and deciding goal when Brann were three goals down but scored four times during 15 minutes in the last half. Hasund also scored important a goal in the 1996-97 UEFA Cup Winners' Cup tie against PSV Eindhoven, and in the quarter-final against Liverpool F.C. Hasund scored Brann's equaliser in their drawn home-leg.

Hasund was one of many players that were released by the club in 1998, and he played the rest of his career at Åsane
