= Jon Eirik Ødegaard =

Norwegian footballer (born 1972)

Personal information
- Date of birth: 29 September 1972 (age 54)
- Positions: Midfielder; left back

Youth career
- Røros
- Rosenborg

Senior career*
Years	Team	Apps	(Gls)
1993–1995	Hamkam		
1996	Strindheim		
1997	Byåsen		
1998–2000	Vålerenga		
2001–2004	Moss		
- Rapid
- Tronvik

Managerial career
- –2010: Moss (junior coach)
- 2011–: Moss (assistant)
- Sprint-Jeløy (coach/developer)
- * Club domestic league appearances and goals

Jon Eirik Ødegaard (born 29 September 1972) is a retired Norwegian footballer.

Hailing from Røros Municipality, he failed to break through from the junior ranks to the senior team at Rosenborg and instead tried his luck in Hamkam. Following relegation from the 1995 Tippeligaen he moved back to Trondheim and took one year in Strindheim and Byåsen each. He was brought back to the first tier by Vålerenga, and played three seasons there and four in Moss. Originally a midfielder, he was converted to left back while at Moss. After quitting his professional career due to serious injury he had outings for low-league teams Rapid and Tronvik.

The son of a camping site and hotel owner in Røros, Ødegaard elected not to take over the family business and instead settled at Jeløya in Moss. He coached Moss' junior team for four years before becoming Tor Thodesen's assistant manager ahead of the 2011 season. He was later a player developer in local minnows Sprint-Jeløy and used his chef training to lead a cafeteria.
