= Høddvoll Stadion =

Norwegian sports stadium

- Interactive map of Høddvoll Stadion
- Location: Ulsteinvik, Ulstein Municipality, Norway
- Coordinates: 62.3403°N 5.8769°E
- Owner: IL Hødd
- Capacity: 4,433
- Surface: Natural grass
- Record attendance: 12,300
- Field size: 105 m × 67.5 m (344 ft × 221 ft)

Construction
- Groundbreaking: 1920
- Opened: 1921
- Renovated: 1963, 1992, 1995, 1999

Tenants
- IL Hødd (football); Dimna IL (athletics)

Høddvoll Stadion is a multi-sports stadium in Ulsteinvik in Ulstein Municipality, Norway. It was the home ground of 2. divisjon side IL Hødd until 2014. It is primary used for football and athletics with its all-weather running track. The stadium is a part of the sports complex consists of the Nye Høddvoll, surrounded by an all-weather running track, a natural grass training pitch and an artificial turf pitch, as well as an indoor hall. Høddvoll has a capacity for 4,433 spectators, of which 2,600 seated.

Hødd was established in 1919 and completed the construction of Høddvoll in 1921. The original field had gravel and was located at the site of current training pitch. It went through a series of upgrades, becoming a grass field in 1989. The main stadium at Høddvoll opened in 1963, and was followed by five season in the top football league the following decade, resulting in various upgrades. The record attendance is about 12,300, from a 1981 Cup match when Hødd played Vålerenga. The venue saw several upgrades during the 1999, and Hødd playing top-league games in 1995. Hødd also played a single UEFA Europa League qualifier at Høddvoll in 2013.

An all-new stadium on the original site was opened in April 2015. It has a capacity for 4,081 spectators, all except 1,000 seated. It was built in conjunction with Ulsteinhallen and indoor athletics, handball and gymnastics hall.

== History ==
Hødd was established on 1 August 1919 and the club's first task was to find a suitable location to play football games. As a temporary arrangement, a football field was rented for the inaugural season for NOK 400. The first location which was considered was to purchase land at Holsekerdalen, but a clause in the contract resulted in 15 of 17 members voted against the purchase at a member meeting on 25 September. Instead the club landed on Høddvoll, which was partitioned out of the farm Støylane and approved by the members on 13 February 1920. The main advantage of Høddvoll over Holsekerdalen was that the former allowed for a future expansion of the facilities. The club borrowed 3,000 Norwegian krone (NOK), which was guaranteed by all adult members and some supporters. Construction stated the same year and by March 1921 NOK 8,800 had been invested in the venue. Financing was aided by a grant of NOK 2,000 from the Football Association of Norway (NFF). The venue opened that year, initially with a gravel pitch.

IL Hødd started with athletics in 1925, which were also based at Høddvoll. The first club house opened in 1932, consisting of a shed measuring 4 by 5 meters (13 by 16 ft). The building tipped over in a storm and the locker rooms were thereafter moved to a nearby farmhouse at Støylane. The first upgrade to the pitch was carried out in 1936, in which it was expanded to 92 by 50 meters (302 by 164 ft). The upgrades cost NOK 1,500, of which the state paid NOK 800. Another new gravel surface was laid in 1939. A further expansion took place at the end of the Second World War. When completed in 1947, the field measured 92 by 58 meters (302 by 190 ft). However, the NOK 22,000 investment was a heavy burden on the club's finances. The third club house opened in 1948, costing NOK 3,000. It featured separate locker rooms for each team, in addition to a common shower room.

Plans for a new stadium at Høddvoll were first articulated in 1951, resulting in a visit from NFF the following year to investigate the possibilities. The motion was passed by the club's annual meeting the same year and was included near the schools in the municipal zoning plan which was being revised. Hødd applied for a municipal grant in 1954. This resulted in a political disagreement as to the location of the new venue. The majority in the municipal council wanted the new stadium to be located at Høddvoll, while the minority called for it to be located next to the schools. This would have given a more central placement in town, but the majority was concerned that this would not give sufficient space for future school expansions, as well as giving higher construction costs. The municipality gave a grant of NOK 10,000 towards land purchases, and Hødd paid NOK 26,321 for the necessary land.

Construction commenced in 1957, but there was very little progress in the work until 1961. The main reasons were the lack of funds and that the contractor went bankrupt. In 1961 there was a boost in the construction, with significant part of the work carried out by volunteers. The pitch was sown by hand in May 1962, but the wet summer caused the grass to not grow properly, and it was never suitable for the season. The pitch was re-sown in the spring of 1963, allowing the new stadium to open on 30 June 1963. Construction cost NOK 200,000, which included a new grandstand. The old clubhouse had become too unmodern and the players instead changed at the community center and were then bused to the stadium.

Hødd was promoted to the 1966 Norwegian First Division, which required Høddvoll to be upgraded, mostly by addition additional rows to the grandstand. It also saw the construction of a new club house, which featured three locker rooms, one for each team and for the referees, and a meeting room. Work on a running track for the athletics group commenced in 1971. Lack of funding delayed construction of the NOK 165,000 investment to be placed on hold until 1973. The completed athletics venue was opened in 1975. Planning of the fifth and current club house started in the early 1980s. Financing was secured through a cooperation with location businesses, with Ulstein Hatlø, Ulstein Propeller, Sunnmørsbanken each buying a stake in the investment of NOK 3 million. It was further expanded in the early 1990s with a kindergarten.

The reserve pitch, the original venue from 1921 which remained a gravel pitch, was upgraded to grass in 1989. It was expanded from 105 by 67 meters (344 by 220 ft) to 125 by 76 meters (410 by 249 ft). As part of a cooperation with NFF, Hødd attempted a trial to see how extensive use the field could handle. This resulted in an extensive wear and the pitch was repeatedly closed to allow the grass to heal. Ahead of the 1992 season the stadium received a roof over the grandstand and 600 seats were installed, costing NOK 1.5 million—paid for by the club's sponsors.

The athletics part of the stadium was not upgraded since 1975 and by the 1990s the section was dilapidated and plans for an all-weather running track and were discussed. This was installed in 1999, along with a new grass turf. This was done simultaneously because the all-weather track required the grass pitch to be moved 9 meters (30 ft) southwards. While this took place, Hødd's A-team played its First Division matches on the training field. The gravel pitch north of the main stadium was converted to an artificial turf field in 2003, opening on 17 October. In addition to a multiplication of the number of hours it could be used by recreational teams and the secondary school, the field could also be used during winter. An indoor football hall, Ulsmohallen, opened in 2007.

== Facilities ==
Høddvoll is a multi-sports complex located at the Støylane area of Ulsteinvik, the main village in Ulstein Norway. Høddvoll Stadion has a natural grass pitch with a playing field measuring 105 by 67.5 meters (344 by 221 ft). It has a seating for 2,600 spectators and 1,733 standing places, giving a combined capacity for 4,433. The stadium is also equipped with an all-weather running track. It is located in the vicinity of Ulstein Upper Secondary School, which also uses the venue during daytime. There are two other pitches at the site, an artificial turf pitch north of the main stadium and a natural grass pitch to the east. The latter, officially named Treningsbane gras 2, measures 125 by 76 meters (410 by 249 ft). North of the training field is the club offices, Høddvollhuset. In addition to locker rooms and club offices, it features a café and event rooms for rental. North of the main stadium and west of the club house is the indoor hall Ulsmohallen. It features a 60-by-45-meter (197 by 148 ft) artificial pitch.

== Events ==
Høddvoll has been the home venue of IL Hødd since 1921. The team has played in the top domestic league of Norway for six seasons, in 1966, 1969–72 and 1995. The team has played a combined 60 home games at the top level at Høddvoll, drawing a total of 196,369 spectators, or an average 3273 per match. Hødd's highest home attendance is 5,297 in their inaugural season, and the lowest during play in the top season was 2,133 in 1970. The record attendance of 12,300 dates from a 1981 Cup match when Hødd played Vålerenga.

The semi-final of the 2012 Norwegian Football Cup was played at Høddvoll, drawing 6,261 spectators, where Hødd won 3–1. After Hødd won the 2012 Cup Final, the team qualified for second qualification round of the 2013–14 UEFA Europa League. A major issue was if the club would be allowed to play their games at Høddvoll, or would have to use the more modern stadia Color Line Stadion in Ålesund or Aker Stadion in Molde. UEFA gave Høddvoll a green light in June. On 18 July 2013, Hødd won 1–0 (lost 1–2 on aggregate) against Kazakhstani side Aktobe, the only European football match played at Høddvoll. The match sold out, drawing 2,019 spectators.

== Future ==
Høddvoll does not meet the criteria for First Division stadia, lacking such amenities as under-soil heating, floodlights and the necessary standard for locker rooms. The club is therefore working on plans to build an all-new stadium at the site of the training pitch—the site of the first stadium from 1921. The new venue will feature a main stand on the north long side and artificial turf. The project is estimated to cost NOK 50 million. The main stand will feature 1,950 seated places, the opposite, south stand will feature 875 seated places, and the eastern stand will feature standing places for 1,000 spectators, for a total of 3,825. The west end will be built as part of Høddvoll Panorama, which combines commercial estate in the ground floor and eighteen apartments in the upper two stories. The new venue is certified for Eliteserien and UEFA matches. Hødd will rent the stadium from the municipality for NOK 2.5 million per year.

The main stand will be built in conjunction with Ulsteinhallen, and will feature common locker rooms and cafeteria. The indoor arena will feature a hall area for recreational athletics, handball and gymnastics, with Dimna IL as the main tenant. Both Ulsteinhallen and the new stadium will be owned by Ulstein Eigedomsselskap KF, a municipal enterprise owned by Ulstein Municipality. The municipality estimates that the hall will cost between one and a half and two million kroner per year to operate. Møre og Romsdal County Municipality secured 47.6 percent of the investment costs and 37.6 percent of the operating costs of the new hall, to allow it to be used by Ulstein Upper Secondary School. This will give the school access to 1,000 square meters (11,000 sq ft) of new floor space and daytime access to the 6,400-square-meter (69,000 sq ft) athletics hall. Construction commenced in December 2012, with Nord-Berg as the main contractor. The arena is scheduled for completion in 2014, when it will become the third-largest indoor athletics arena in Norway, costing NOK 123 million.

== Bibliography ==
- Flatin, Arne (1994). Heia Hødd (in Norwegian). Ulstein: IL. ISBN 82-993310-0-5.
- Fagerli, Arnfinn; Nilsen, Christian Lunde (1999). Norsk fotball-leksikon (in Norwegian). Orion. ISBN 82-458-0398-7.
