= Under-soil heating =

Method of heating sports stadiums

Under-soil Heating Technology
- Application: Sports stadia, Agriculture
- Fuel source: Electric, Gas
- Components: Corrosion-resistant metal pipes, Energy-efficient heating elements, Automated control units
- Invented: 1950s

Under-soil heating is a method used in various sports stadia to warm the playing surface and prevent the buildup of snow or ice, helping avoid the postponement of matches due to poor weather. The first ground in England to have under-soil heating installed was Goodison Park in 1958.

== Technology ==
Under-soil heating technology is designed to address the challenges of adverse weather conditions, specifically the accumulation of ice and snow on ground surfaces. The system consists of a network of corrosion-resistant metal pipes laid beneath the soil or turf. These pipes are connected to a central heating unit that contains energy-efficient heating elements. When the system is activated, the heating unit circulates warm water or air through the pipes, effectively raising the soil temperature. Modern versions of this technology often include automated control units that allow for real-time monitoring and precise temperature adjustments, ensuring that the soil temperature is maintained at a level that prevents the formation of ice and snow.

There have been numerous occasions where under-soil heating's effectiveness has been questioned. On 28 December 2005, three stadia in the FA Premier League, supposedly equipped with under-soil heating, failed to stop their pitches being covered in thick snow - this led to the matches being postponed. Subsequently, on 1 January 2006, the Premier League investigated as to why the pitches at Reebok Stadium (Bolton Wanderers), Ewood Park (Blackburn Rovers) and St. James' Park (Newcastle United) were not able to repel the snow. In the U.S., a notable example of the failure of an under-soil heating system occurred in 1967, when a newly installed system at Lambeau Field in Green Bay, Wisconsin failed before the NFL Championship game. The game would go on to be remembered as the "Ice Bowl".

== Usage ==
For the 2025-26 season, the English Premier League requires its teams to have an undersoil heating system for their pitch. The pitch at Old Trafford has 18.4 miles (29.6 km) of under-soil heating and the system at Elland Road consists of 59 miles (95 km) of piping. As of the 2024-25 season, clubs in the English Football League are given the choice of providing "full pitch frost covers and/or under soil heating".

As of 2011, the Czech First League requires all teams to play on surfaces with under-soil heating despite the league having a winter break.

In Germany under-soil heating is mandatory for division 1 and 2 Bundesliga clubs. The first ground to have it installed was the Olympic Stadium in Munich in 1972.

The old Scottish Premier League required all its clubs to have undersoil heating, but this condition was relaxed following the restructuring of Scottish football in 2013. Instead, all clubs in the top two divisions of the new Scottish Professional Football League must have grounds at the Bronze level, which allows pitch covers as an alternative to undersoil heating. As of 2023, undersoil heating is only required for grass pitches at the Gold or Platinum levels in Scotland.

Several American football teams in the National Football League also have such a system installed. With American football, it is more a matter of player safety, since NFL games are never postponed on account of cold weather.
