= Ståle Slettebø =

Norwegian footballer (born 1964)

Personal information
- Date of birth: 21 August 1964 (age 62)
- Position: Midfielder

Youth career
- Drøbak-Frogn

Senior career*
Years	Team	Apps	(Gls)
198x–1993	Drøbak-Frogn		
1994–1995	Stabæk	37	(0)

International career
1981	Norway u-17	3	(0)
1982	Norway u-20	6	(0)
- * Club domestic league appearances and goals

Ståle Slettebø (born 21 August 1964) is a retired Norwegian football midfielder.

He came through the youth ranks of Drøbak-Frogn IL, making his senior debut in the early 1980s. He also represented Norway as a youth international. In 1994 he moved on to second-tier club Stabæk IF, securing promotion and also playing for them in the 1995 Tippeligaen. He got 37 league games and 6 cup games for Stabæk before retiring from football.

Moss FK wanted to sign him ahead of the 1990 season.
