= Tommy Sylte =

Norwegian footballer (born 1971)

Personal information
- Date of birth: 27 October 1971 (age 55)
- Place of birth: Norway
- Position: Forward

Youth career
- Volda

Senior career*
Years	Team	Apps	(Gls)
1988–1990	Volda		
1991–1995	Hødd		
1996–1999	Moss	89	(26)
2000–2005	Hødd		
- * Club domestic league appearances and goals

Tommy Sylte (born 27 October 1971) is a retired Norwegian football striker.

Hailing from Volda Municipality, he made his debut for Volda TI in 1988, scoring in his first match. Ahead of the 1991 season he joined Hødd, getting his first-tier debut in 1995. He went on to play for, and eventually captain, Moss FK from 1996 through 1999 before finishing his career in Hødd.
