= Geir Televik =

Norwegian footballer (born 1971)

Personal information
- Full name: Geir Televik
- Date of birth: 23 July 1971 (age 55)
- Position: Striker

Senior career*
Years	Team	Apps	(Gls)
- Tornado
1993–1996	Hødd		
1997–1998	Molde		
1998	→ Hødd (loan)		
1999–2005	Hødd		
1999	→ Aalesund (loan)		
- * Club domestic league appearances and goals

Geir Televik (born 23 July 1971) is a retired Norwegian football striker.

He started his career in Tornado FK. For IL Hødd he participated in their promotion to the highest level after the 1994 season. He scored 13 goals in the 1995 Norwegian Premier League; only five players had more goals. After the 1996 season he was sold to Molde FK for 450,000 kr.

He spent some time in the early summer of 1998 on loan to Hødd. After the 1998 season Reading F.C. had him on trial, but neither Televik nor Trond Strande was offered a contract. Televik was released from Molde in December. He rejoined Hødd. In late 1999 he was loaned by Aalesunds FK for the playoffs to the First Division. He retired after the 2005 season.
