= IL Hødd =

Norwegian sports club

Hødd
- Full name: Idrottslaget Hødd
- Founded: 1 August 1919; 107 years ago
- Ground: Høddvoll; Ulsteinvik
- Capacity: 4,081
- Chairman: Jan Arild Roppen
- Manager: Ivan Poulsen
- League: OBOS-ligaen
- 2026: 1. divisjon, 10th of 16
| Home colours | Away colours | Third colours |

Idrottslaget Hødd is a multi-sports club from Ulsteinvik in Møre og Romsdal, Norway. Founded in 1919, it has sections for team handball, gymnastics and football. It is best known for their men's football team, which since 2015 plays at Høddvoll, whose stated capacity is 4,081. The club's old home ground, Høddvoll Stadion, holds the record attendance of over 12,000 spectators at a match against Vålerenga in 1981.

Hødd are currently playing in 1. divisjon, the second tier of Norwegian football. They played in the top tier in 1966, 1969–72 (4 seasons) and 1995 and is the club that has played most seasons at the second tier. Hødd won the Norwegian Cup in 2012.

== History ==
=== Formation and early years ===
Idrottslaget Hødd was founded on 1 August 1919. The name derives from Höðr, which was a gifted archer in Norse mythology, and means "battle" or "fight". Before the Second World War, the football team was not competitive with the two big clubs in the region, Rollon and Aalesund. Hødd was first promoted to the Landsdelserien (second tier) in 1950, and was close on promotion to Hovedserien in both the 1951–52 season and the 1958–59 season, but lost the promotion in the play-off against Ranheim and Brage respectively. Hødd also reached the third round of the Norwegian Football Cup on several occasions during the 1950s, where they were eliminated by first-tier teams.

=== 1965-1972: The golden era ===
Hødd was promoted to the 1. divisjon for the first time in the 1965 season when they won their 2. divisjon group ahead of Rosenborg and Brann on goal difference, after Rosenborg lost 2–1 against Brann in the decisive match while Hødd won 8–2 against Kvik Trondheim on Lerkendal Stadion. With Kjetil Hasund as the most notable star on the small team from a small place in the outskirts of Norway, the national media predicted that Hødd would relegated in its first season in the top-flight. The pundits were right and Hødd were relegated from the 1966 1. divisjon, but the team performed well and was only one point short of avoiding relegation. All the players stayed at the club after the relegation, and were again promoted to the top-flight in the 1968 season.

When Hødd was back in the 1. divisjon, the team had learned its lesson and for the next three season the team had a miraculous ability to avoid relegation. As favourites to be relegated, Hødd won 3–1 against Sarpsborg in the last match of the 1969 season while Start won 2–0 against Lyn. These results saved Hødd from relegation as they finished level on points but with better goal difference then Start and Lyn, who were relegated. That Lyn was relegated was quite a surprise, as the team had won the double in the previous season and played the quarterfinal of the 1968–69 European Cup Winners' Cup against Barcelona. Hødd reached the quarter-final of the Norwegian Football Cup for its first time in 1969, where they lost 1–3 against Fredrikstad. The next season, Hødd again avoided relegation with better goal difference then the relegated team, after Hødd won 6–0 against Pors while Skeid lost 1–0 against Strømsgodset in the decisive match, and Skeid was relegated. In the 1971 season, Hødd won 5–0 against Frigg in the penultimate match and avoided relegation with two points ahead of Frigg. After four seasons in the first-tier league, Hødd were relegated in 1972.

=== 1970s and 1980s ===
After playing in the 2. divisjon in the 1970s, Hødd were relegated in the 1980 season and were playing at the third tier since their last time in 1964. With Terje Skarsfjord as head coach the team won promotion to the 2. divisjon and reached the quarterfinal of the 1981 Norwegian Football Cup. The third-tier team met the defending Norwegian Football Cup champions Vålerenga in the quarterfinal at Høddvoll, and Hødd scored the first goal before Vålerenga turned the match into a 2–1 victory. The match was watched by 12,300 spectators, which is the club's record attendance. Jan Åge Fjørtoft and Børre Meinseth had their breakthrough in the 1985 season, but Hødd were relegated in 1987 and were playing at the third tier in 1988 and finished behind the local team Hareid before Hødd won promotion to the 2nd tier the next season.

=== 1990s: Ups and downs ===
Hødd reached the quarter-final of the 1994, where they lost 3–5 after extra time against Lyn, and won the 1994 1. divisjon and was promoted to Tippeligaen with Erik Brakstad as head coach. Hødd eliminating the defending Norwegian Cup winners Molde in the fourth round of the 1995 Norwegian Football Cup with 2–0 at home after goals from Tommy Sylte. The team went on to reach the semi-final where they lost 7–1 on aggregate against Rosenborg after losing 5–0 in the first leg at home. The team was however relegated after only one season, as they finished 12th in the 1995 Tippeligaen. With the exception of 2000, Hødd played in the 1. divisjon until 2006 when the club was relegated to the 2. divisjon, and is the club with the most seasons at the second tier since 1963. Hødd hired Sture Fladmark, who won Tippeligaen coach of the year in 2002, as the new head coach ahead of the 2007 season, to win promotion back to the 1. divisjon. Hødd won promotion to the First Division in 2007, and started the 2008 season with a win against Sarpsborg Sparta before the team collected six points in the next 16 matches. With nine points and seven losses in a row Hødd fired Fladmark in August 2008.

=== A new golden generation ===
Einar Magne Skede and Lars Arne Nilsen replaced Fladmark, but could not prevent the team from relegation. Skede and Nilsen continued as head coaches in 2009, when Hødd finished third in the 2. divisjon, before Nilsen continued as the sole head coach in 2010 when the team won promotion to the 1. divisjon. The newly promoted team impressed in the 2011 season, and managed to go 29 matches without losing until they lost away against Sandefjord on 22 May 2011. Hødd was positioned at second place half-way through the season, before finishing the season at eighth place.

The next season did not start as good, and after eight matches Hødd had three points with 21 conceded goals, before they went unbeaten for the next six league-games. Hødd remained in the relegation-zone throughout the season and avoided relegation with better goal difference then Tromsdalen.

In 2012, Hødd won its first Norwegian Football Cup. The feat was according to pundit Arne Scheie the biggest upset in the history of the Norwegian Cup, as Hødd was a second-tier team who had in fact been fighting against relegation up until the last round in the league. Despite their troubles in 1. divisjon, Hødd defeated the first-tier teams Haugesund and Brann, qualifying them to their first ever cup final. Their opponent in the final was Tromsø, who finished fourth in Tippeligaen. After regular time, the score was 1–1, and no goals were scored in extra time. In the penalty shoot-out, Hødd won 4–2. Ørjan Nyland was named man of the match, while Fredrik Aursnes became the youngest ever Norwegian Cup winner aged 16 years and 351 days.

Hødd failed to defend the Norwegian Cup title, as the team was eliminated by the defending Tippeligaen winners Molde in the third round of the 2013 Norwegian Football Cup, after a penalty shoot-out where Hødd's former goalkeeper Ørjan Nyland, who had transferred to Molde after the previous season, saved two penalties. As a result of the Norwegian Cup win, Hødd qualified for the first time in a European competition, Europa League. They debuted with a 1–0 victory at home against Aktobe, but the European adventure ended after a 2–0 loss in the second leg.

== Notable players ==
After the relegation from the top-flight in 1972, the club did not manage to keep the talented youngsters at the club, and Svein Inge Urke and Åge Hareide moved to Start and Molde respectively. For the next decades, the club continued to develop talented players, like the sons of the generation that played in the First Division, Geir Hasund, Børre Meinseth, Diegol, Egil Ulfstein, Ole Bjørn Sundgot and Arild Sundgot along with Jan Åge Fjørtoft and Karl Oskar Fjørtoft moved elsewhere to play in the top-flight after having had a good development in Hødd.

In 2012, Hødd arranged an official voting of the best player in the history of the club and Kjetil Hasund, who scored 460 goals in 646 matches for Hødd, was voted as the best ever player. He was capped 16 times for Norway and is still the only player to be capped for Norway while playing for Hødd. With his 683 matches, André Nevstad is the player with most matches for Hødd and he was voted as the second best Hødd-player, while Otto Sundgot finished third in the competition. Åge Hareide, Sindre Eid, Hallbjørn Hasund, Karl Oskar Fjørtoft, Geir Hasund, Geir Televik and Jan Åge Fjørtoft were the other players in the top ten, while Vidar Ulstein was voted as the best goalkeeper.

== Honours ==
- Norwegian Football Cup
  - Winners (1): 2012

== Recent history ==
| Season | | Pos. | Pl. | W | D | L | GS | GA | P | Cup | Notes |
|---|---|---|---|---|---|---|---|---|---|---|---|
| 2001 | 1. divisjon | 11 | 30 | 9 | 8 | 13 | 50 | 51 | 35 | Fourth round | |
| 2002 | 1. divisjon | 7 | 30 | 16 | 4 | 10 | 50 | 41 | 52 | Fourth round | |
| 2003 | 1. divisjon | 11 | 30 | 9 | 8 | 13 | 51 | 54 | 35 | Third round | |
| 2004 | 1. divisjon | 6 | 30 | 14 | 2 | 14 | 63 | 59 | 44 | Third round | |
| 2005 | 1. divisjon | 9 | 10 | 7 | 13 | 37 | 53 | 54 | 37 | Third round | |
| 2006 | 1. divisjon | ↓ 16 | 30 | 4 | 7 | 19 | 29 | 61 | 19 | Second round | Relegated to the 2. divisjon |
| 2007 | 2. divisjon | ↑ 1 | 26 | 18 | 3 | 5 | 77 | 30 | 57 | First round | Promoted to the 1. divisjon |
| 2008 | 1. divisjon | ↓ 16 | 30 | 2 | 8 | 20 | 29 | 76 | 14 | Third round | Relegated to the 2. divisjon |
| 2009 | 2. divisjon | 2 | 26 | 14 | 4 | 8 | 69 | 44 | 46 | Second round | |
| 2010 | 2. divisjon | ↑ 1 | 26 | 18 | 6 | 2 | 81 | 23 | 60 | First round | Promoted to the 1. divisjon |
| 2011 | 1. divisjon | 8 | 30 | 13 | 7 | 10 | 54 | 42 | 46 | Third round | |
| 2012 | 1. divisjon | 12 | 30 | 10 | 5 | 15 | 43 | 52 | 35 | Winner | Qualified to the Europa League |
| 2013 | 1. divisjon | 3 | 30 | 15 | 5 | 10 | 41 | 31 | 50 | Third round | |
| 2014 | 1. divisjon | 8 | 30 | 12 | 7 | 11 | 48 | 49 | 43 | Second round | |
| 2015 | 1. divisjon | 4 | 30 | 14 | 6 | 10 | 43 | 40 | 48 | Fourth round | |
| 2016 | 1. divisjon | ↓ 14 | 30 | 8 | 6 | 16 | 31 | 57 | 30 | Second round | Relegated to the 2. divisjon |
| 2017 | 2. divisjon | 6 | 26 | 11 | 7 | 8 | 44 | 37 | 40 | Second round | |
| 2018 | 2. divisjon | 3 | 26 | 13 | 8 | 5 | 43 | 30 | 47 | Fourth round | |
| 2019 | 2. divisjon | 7 | 26 | 10 | 5 | 11 | 40 | 45 | 35 | Second round | |
| 2020 | 2. divisjon | 3 | 17 | 9 | 3 | 5 | 28 | 14 | 30 | Cancelled | |
| 2021 | 2. divisjon | 2 | 26 | 18 | 6 | 2 | 67 | 18 | 60 | Second round | |
| 2022 | 2. divisjon | ↑ 1 | 26 | 18 | 6 | 2 | 54 | 15 | 60 | Second round | Promoted to the 1. divisjon |
| 2023 | 1. divisjon | ↓ 14 | 30 | 8 | 9 | 13 | 29 | 38 | 33 | Second round | Relegated to the 2. divisjon |
| 2024 | 2. divisjon | ↑ 1 | 26 | 18 | 4 | 4 | 50 | 22 | 58 | Third round | Promoted to the 1. divisjon |
| 2025 | 1. divisjon | 10 | 30 | 8 | 9 | 13 | 34 | 52 | 33 | Second round | |
| 2026 | 1. divisjon | 10 | 30 | 11 | 6 | 13 | 49 | 59 | 39 | Second round | |

== European record ==
| Season | Competition | Round | Club | Home | Away | Aggregate |
|---|---|---|---|---|---|---|
| 2013–14 | UEFA Europa League | Second qualifying round | (Kazakhstan) Aktobe | 1–0 | 0–2 | 1–2 |

== History of league positions (since 1963) ==
| | 1963– 1964 | 1965 | 1966 | 1967– 1968 | 1969– 1972 | 1973– 1980 | 1981 | 1982– 1987 | 1988– 1989 | 1990– 1994 | 1995 | 1996– 1999 | 2000 | 2001– 2006 | 2007 | 2008 | 2009– 2010 | 2011– 2016 | 2017– 2022 | 2023 | 2024 | 2025– |
|---|---|---|---|---|---|---|---|---|---|---|---|---|---|---|---|---|---|---|---|---|---|---|
| Level 1 | | | | | | | | | | | | | | | | | | | | | | |
| Level 2 | | | | | | | | | | | | | | | | | | | | | | |
| Level 3 | | | | | | | | | | | | | | | | | | | | | | |

== Current squad ==
As of 3 September 2026

Note: Flags indicate national team as defined under FIFA eligibility rules; some limited exceptions apply. Players may hold more than one non-FIFA nationality.

| No. | Pos. | Nation | Player |
|---|---|---|---|
| 1 | GK | NOR | Thomas Kinn |
| 2 | DF | GEQ | Charles Ondo |
| 3 | DF | NOR | Sondre Fosnæss Hanssen |
| 4 | DF | NOR | Eirik Blikstad |
| 5 | DF | NOR | Mirza Mulac |
| 6 | MF | NOR | Halvard Urnes |
| 7 | MF | AUS | Matthew Scarcella |
| 8 | MF | NOR | Torbjørn Kallevåg (captain) |
| 9 | FW | SWE | Cameron Streete |
| 11 | FW | SWE | Manaf Rawufu |
| 14 | DF | SWE | Marcus Mikhail |
| 15 | MF | NOR | Vegard Håheim-Elveseter |

| No. | Pos. | Nation | Player |
|---|---|---|---|
| 16 | MF | DEN | Mathias Kaarsbo (on loan from Lyngby) |
| 17 | DF | NOR | Tage Johansen |
| 19 | FW | DEN | Sebastian Biller (on loan from Silkeborg IF) |
| 20 | FW | NOR | Jon Berisha (on loan from Ranheim) |
| 21 | DF | NOR | Åsmund Roppen |
| 22 | FW | NOR | Kasper Reme Abrahamsen |
| 23 | MF | NOR | Fredrik Gjerde |
| 24 | DF | NOR | Jesper Robertsen |
| 25 | GK | DEN | Oscar Buur (on loan from Copenhagen) |
| 27 | DF | NOR | Gudmund Andresen |
| 29 | FW | NOR | Martin Håheim-Elveseter (on loan from Sarpsborg 08) |

For season transfers, see List of Norwegian football transfers winter 2025-26, and List of Norwegian football transfers summer 2026.

=== Out on loan ===
Note: Flags indicate national team as defined under FIFA eligibility rules; some limited exceptions apply. Players may hold more than one non-FIFA nationality.

| No. | Pos. | Nation | Player |
|---|---|---|---|
| 2 | DF | NOR | Noah Riise (at Pors until 31 December 2026) |
| 18 | MF | NOR | Ola Lerheim Olsen (at Lysekloster until 31 December 2026) |

| No. | Pos. | Nation | Player |
|---|---|---|---|
| 26 | GK | NOR | Aksel Bergsvik (at Sandviken until 31 December 2026) |

== Other sports ==
IL Hødd also has sections for team handball and gymnastics. The club previously had a section for athletics, which utilized the multi-use stadium Høddvoll as well. Hødd's athletics department hosted the 1980 Norwegian Championships in standing jumps. Athletics in the city has now been taken over by the Dimna IL sports club.
