= 2015 Mjøndalen IF Fotball season =

Mjøndalen
2015 season
- Manager: Vegard Hansen
- Stadium: Isachsen Stadion
- Tippeligaen: 15th (Relegated)
- Norwegian Cup: Quarter-final vs Rosenborg
- Top goalscorer: League: Rhett Bernstein (5); All: Two Players (6)
Home colours	Away colours

The 2015 season is Mjøndalen's 105th season, and their first in the Tippeligaen for 22 years. It is their 10th season with Vegard Hansen as manager, during which they will compete in both the Norwegian Cup and the Tippeligaen.

== Squad ==
As of 29 August 2015

Note: Flags indicate national team as defined under FIFA eligibility rules; some limited exceptions apply. Players may hold more than one non-FIFA nationality.

No.	Pos.	Nation	Player
1	GK	NOR	Ivar Andreas Forn
2	DF	NOR	Ulrik Arneberg
3	DF	NOR	Joachim Solberg Olsen
4	DF	NOR	Martin Strange
5	DF	NOR	Karanveer Grewal
6	MF	NZL	Craig Henderson (on loan from Stabæk)
7	FW	DEN	Sanel Kapidžić
8	MF	NOR	Stian Rasch
9	MF	NOR	Mads Hansen
10	MF	NOR	Erik Midtgarden
11	MF	NOR	Christian Gauseth
14	MF	CIV	Vamouti Diomande

No.	Pos.	Nation	Player
15	MF	NOR	Stian Aasmundsen
16	MF	NOR	Mads Gundersen
17	FW	NOR	Amahl Pellegrino
18	DF	USA	Rhett Bernstein
19	FW	NOR	Tokmac Nguen (on loan from Strømsgodset)
20	FW	SEN	Ousseynou Boye
21	MF	NOR	Magnus Sylling Olsen
22	DF	NOR	Morten Sundli
23	FW	USA	Erik Hurtado (on loan from Vancouver Whitecaps FC)
24	MF	NOR	Henrik Gulden (on loan from VfL Bochum)
30	GK	DEN	Marco Pris Jørgensen

== Transfers ==
=== Winter ===
In: Note: Flags indicate national team as defined under FIFA eligibility rules; some limited exceptions apply. Players may hold more than one non-FIFA nationality.

No.	Pos.	Nation	Player
6	MF	NOR	Michael Stilson (from (Norway) Lokomotiv Oslo)
21	MF	NOR	Magnus Sylling Olsen (from (Norway) HamKam, previously on loan)
23	FW	NOR	Tim André Nilsen (from (Norway) Sogndal)
24	MF	SEN	Amidou Diop (on loan from (Norway) Molde)

Out: Note: Flags indicate national team as defined under FIFA eligibility rules; some limited exceptions apply. Players may hold more than one non-FIFA nationality.

No.	Pos.	Nation	Player

=== Summer ===
In: Note: Flags indicate national team as defined under FIFA eligibility rules; some limited exceptions apply. Players may hold more than one non-FIFA nationality.

No.	Pos.	Nation	Player
6	MF	NZL	Craig Henderson (on loan from (Norway) Stabæk)
17	FW	NOR	Amahl Pellegrino (from (Norway) Lillestrøm)
19	FW	NOR	Tokmac Nguen (on loan from (Norway) Strømsgodset)
20	FW	SEN	Ousseynou Boye (from (Senegal) Diambars)
23	FW	USA	Erik Hurtado (on loan from (United States) Vancouver Whitecaps)
24	MF	NOR	Henrik Gulden (on loan from (Germany) VfL Bochum)
30	GK	DEN	Marco Priis Jørgensen (free agent)

Out: Note: Flags indicate national team as defined under FIFA eligibility rules; some limited exceptions apply. Players may hold more than one non-FIFA nationality.

No.	Pos.	Nation	Player
6	MF	NOR	Michael Stilson (on loan to (Norway) Ranheim)
12	GK	NOR	Andreas Håskjold (to (Norway) Nesodden)
17	MF	NOR	Erlend Skagestad (on loan to (Norway) Modum)
19	DF	NOR	Joakim Mohn Rishovd (to (Norway) Modum)
20	FW	GAM	Alagie Sosseh (to (Norway) Nest-Sotra)
23	FW	NOR	Tim André Nilsen (on loan to (Norway) Fredrikstad)
24	MF	SEN	Amidou Diop (loan return to (Norway) Molde)

== Competitions ==
=== Tippeligaen ===
==== Results summary ====
Overall								Home						Away					
Pld	W	D	L	GF	GA	GD	Pts	W	D	L	GF	GA	GD	W	D	L	GF	GA	GD
30	4	9	17	38	69	−31	21	4	3	8	23	36	−13	0	6	9	15	33	−18

Last updated: 8 November 2015.
Source: see below

==== Results by round ====
Round	1	2	3	4	5	6	7	8	9	10	11	12	13	14	15	16	17	18	19	20	21	22	23	24	25	26	27	28	29	30
Ground	H	A	H	A	H	A	H	H	A	H	A	H	A	H	A	H	A	H	A	H	A	H	A	H	A	H	A	A	H	A
Result	W	D	D	D	L	L	W	W	L	L	L	D	D	D	L	L	D	L	L	W	L	L	D	L	L	L	L	D	L	L
Position	5	6	7	7	8	14	10	8	10	10	12	11	11	12	12	15	15	15	15	14	14	14	13	14	15	15	15	15	15	15

Updated to match(es) played on 8 November 2015. Source: see below
A = Away; H = Home; W = Win; D = Draw; L = Loss

==== Results ====
6 April 2015 1	Mjøndalen	1–0	Viking	Mjøndalen
15:30 CEST (UTC+2)	Sundli (yellow card) 4'; M.S.Olsen (yellow card) 39'; Kapidžić 63'; Gundersen (yellow card) 90+1'; Gauseth (yellow card) 90+4'	Summary	Sigurðsson (yellow card) 15'	Stadium: Isachsen Stadion; Attendance: 2,548; Referee: Brage Sandmoen

11 April 2015 2	Strømsgodset	1–1	Mjøndalen	Drammen
18:00 CEST (UTC+2)	Hamoud 31'; Flamur Kastrati (yellow card) 44'	Summary	Midtgarden 8'; Sundli (yellow card) 45'; Forn (yellow card) 49'; J.S.Olsen (yellow card) 60'	Stadium: Marienlyst Stadion; Attendance: 8,468; Referee: Svein Oddvar Moen

18 April 2015 3	Mjøndalen	1–1	Start	Mjøndalen
15:30 CEST (UTC+2)	Midtgarden (penalty missed); Gundersen 48'	Summary	Christensen (yellow card) 36'; Vilhjálmsson 88'	Stadium: Isachsen Stadion; Attendance: 2,468; Referee: Ola Hobber Nilsen

25 April 2015 4	Odd	2–2	Mjøndalen	Skien
15:30 CEST (UTC+2)	Ruud 30', 40'	Summary	Sundli (yellow card) 27'; Midtgarden (yellow card) 29'; Aasmundsen 59'; Kapidzic (yellow card) 80', (goal) 90+4'	Stadium: Skagerak Arena; Attendance: 7,847; Referee: Tore Hansen

30 April 2015 5	Mjøndalen	1–4	Lillestrøm	Mjøndalen
20:00 CEST (UTC+2)	M.S.Olsen 10'	Summary	Friday 39', 49', 60'; Fofana 68'; Pellegrino (yellow card) 87'	Stadium: Isachsen Stadion; Attendance: 3,150; Referee: Anders Johansen

3 May 2015 6	Stabæk	1–0	Mjøndalen	Bærum
18:00 CEST (UTC+2)	Issah (yellow card) 65'; Asante 70'; El Ghanassy (yellow card) 79'	Summary	M.S.Olsen (yellow card) 39'	Stadium: Nadderud Stadion; Attendance: 3,778; Referee: Tommy Skjerven

9 May 2015 7	Mjøndalen	4–3	Tromsø	Mjøndalen
15:30 CEST (UTC+2)	Gauseth 38' (pen.), 72'; M.S.Olsen (yellow card) 47'; Bernstein 74', 90'	Summary	Åsen 21'; Ondrášek 28', 46' (yellow card) 43'; Johansen (yellow card) 74'; Ødegaard (yellow card) 89'	Stadium: Isachsen Stadion; Attendance: 1,949; Referee: Trygve Kjensli

12 May 2015 8	Mjøndalen	3–2	Rosenborg	Mjøndalen
18:00 CEST (UTC+2)	Hansen 36'; Bernstein 43', 90+1'; Gundersen (yellow card) 54'; Stilson (yellow card) 90+3'	Summary	Helland 21'; Mikkelsen 22'	Stadium: Isachsen Stadion; Attendance: 3,246; Referee: Trond Ivar Døvle

16 May 2015 9	Vålerenga	4–2	Mjøndalen	Oslo
15:30 CEST (UTC+2)	Lindkvist 27', 73'; Grindheim 42', (yellow card) 56'; Berre 88'; Holm (yellow card) 90+3'	Summary	Aasmundsen (yellow card) 22'; Gundersen 43'; Bernstein (yellow card) 77'; M.S.Olsen 87'	Stadium: Ullevål stadion Attendance: 12 011; Referee: Svein Oddvar Moen

22 May 2015 10	Mjøndalen	0–3	Molde	Mjøndalen
19:00 CEST (UTC+2)	J.S.Olsen (yellow card) 19'; M.S.Olsen (yellow card) 51'; Gauseth (yellow card) 54'	Summary	Elyounoussi 28'; Forren (yellow card) 50'; Forren 53'; Svendsen 56'; Høiland (yellow card) 70'	Stadium: Mjøndalen Arena; Attendance: 2,654; Referee: Espen Berntsen

31 May 2015 11	Bodø/Glimt	5–1	Mjøndalen	Bodø
18:00 CEST (UTC+2)	Furebotn 19'; Cruz 40'; Saltnes 61', (yellow card) 71'; Olsen 70', 87'	Summary	Sundli 29'; Arneberg (yellow card) 60'	Stadium: Aspmyra stadion Attendance: 2,666; Referee: Ole Gya

7 June 2015 12	Mjøndalen	1–1	Sarpsborg 08	Mjøndalen
18:00 CEST (UTC+2)	Gauseth 24' (pen.); J.S.Olsen (yellow card) 45'; Sosseh (yellow card) 75'; Arneberg (yellow card) 89'	Summary	Kerr (yellow card) 23'; Ernemann (yellow card) 73'; Zajić 87'	Stadium: Isachsen Stadion; Attendance: 2,556; Referee: Tore Hansen

21 June 2015 13	Haugesund	1–1	Mjøndalen	Haugesund
18:00 CEST (UTC+2)	Gytkjær 6'; Cvetinović (yellow card) 34'; Andreassen (yellow card) 83'; Stølås (yellow card) 89'	Summary	Diop (yellow card) 26'; Strange (yellow card) 39'; Aasmundsen (yellow card) 52' (yellow-red card) 68'; Sundli 64'	Stadium: Haugesund Stadion; Attendance: 6,016; Referee: Trond Ivar Døvle

28 June 2015 14	Mjøndalen	2–2	Sandefjord	Mjøndalen
18:00 CEST (UTC+2)	J.S.Olsen (yellow card) 80'; Nilsen 84'; Arneberg 90'	Summary	Hansen (yellow card) 9'; Kirkevold 28', 42'; Fevang (yellow card) 33'; Dieng (yellow card) 43'; Tørnes (yellow card) 85'	Stadium: Isachsen Stadion; Attendance: 2,207; Referee: Kai Erik Steen

5 July 2015 15	Aalesund	4–2	Mjøndalen	Ålesund
18:00 CEST (UTC+2)	Larsen (yellow card) 26'; James 55', 83'; Þrándarson 88'; Björk 90+1'	Summary	Gauseth 5'; J.S.Olsen 37'; Grewal (yellow card) 62' (yellow-red card) 63'	Stadium: Color Line Stadion; Attendance: 6 021; Referee: Ken Henry Johnsen

12 July 2015 16	Mjøndalen	1–2	Bodø/Glimt	Mjøndalen
18:00 CEST (UTC+2)	Gauseth (yellow card) 44'; Aasmundsen 90'	Summary	Azemi 12'; Badou (yellow card) 45'; Moe 52'	Stadium: Isachsen Stadion; Attendance: 2,048; Referee: Martin Lundby

26 July 2015 17	Sarpsborg 08	2–2	Mjøndalen	Sarpsborg
18:00 CEST (UTC+2)	Kovács 42'; Mortensen 64'	Summary	Sosseh (yellow card) 22' (goal) 57'; Aasmundsen (yellow card) 53'; Kapidzic (yellow card) 87'; Sundli 90'	Stadium: Sarpsborg Stadion; Attendance: 3,368; Referee: Svein Erik Edvartsen

2 August 2015 18	Mjøndalen	3–6	Odd	Mjøndalen
15:30 CEST (UTC+2)	Gundersen (yellow card) 31'; Midtgarden 42'; Gauseth (yellow card) 52'; Kapidžić 57', 88'	Summary	Jensen 16'; Arneberg 23' (o.g.); Occéan 25'; Bentley 68'; Halvorsen 70', 90'	Stadium: Isachsen Stadion; Attendance: 2,236; Referee: Tore Hansen

7 August 2015 19	Sandefjord	2–1	Mjøndalen	Sandefjord
19:00 CEST (UTC+2)	Sellin 30', 53'	Summary	Arneberg (yellow card) 20'; Midtgarden 26'; Aasmundsen (yellow card) 87'; M.S.Olsen (yellow card) 90+1'	Stadium: Komplett Arena; Attendance: 6,174; Referee: Ole Gya

15 August 2015 20	Mjøndalen	2–1	Haugesund	Mjøndalen
CEST (UTC+2)	M.S.Olsen (yellow card) 52'; Bernstein 56'; Hurtado (yellow card) 59'; Henderson 90+4'	Summary	Yusuf (yellow card) 27'; Hurtado 39' (o.g.); Haukås (yellow card) 90+3'	Stadium: Mjøndalen Arena; Attendance: 2,233; Referee: Dag Vidar Hafsås

23 August 2015 21	Rosenborg	1–0	Mjøndalen	Trondheim
20:00 CEST (UTC+2)	Vilhjálmsson 62'	Summary	J.S.Olsen (yellow card) 21'	Stadium: Lerkendal Stadion; Attendance: 16,660; Referee: Tom Harald Hagen

30 August 2015 22	Mjøndalen	2–4	Strømsgodset	Mjøndalen
18:00 CEST (UTC+2)	Aasmundsen 47'; Pellegrino 50'	Summary	Pedersen 14', 90', 90' (yellow card) 45'; Wikheim (yellow card) 32'; Fossum 41'	Stadium: Isachsen Stadion; Attendance: 4,139; Referee: Svein-Erik Edvartsen

13 September 2015 23	Tromsø	0–0	Mjøndalen	Tromsø
15:30 CEST (UTC+2)		Summary	Aasmundsen (yellow card) 19'; Gundersen (yellow card) 90+4'	Stadium: Alfheim Stadion; Attendance: 3,532; Referee: Dag Vidar Hafsås

20 September 2015 24	Mjøndalen	0–1	Vålerenga	Mjøndalen
20:00 CEST (UTC+2)	Arneberg (yellow card) 88'	Summary	Jääger 22'; Zahid (yellow card) 88'	Stadium: Isachsen Stadion; Attendance: 2,502; Referee: Espen Berntsen

26 September 2015 25	Lillestrøm	3–0	Mjøndalen	Lillestrøm
15:30 CEST (UTC+2)	Friday 9'; Kolstad (yellow card) 40'; Knudtzon 70'; Martin 88'	Summary		Stadium: Åråsen Stadion; Attendance: 4,306; Referee: Kim Andre Johnsen

3 October 2015 26	Mjøndalen	1–4	Stabæk	Mjøndalen
18:00 CEST (UTC+2)	Aasmundsen (yellow card) 24'; Hurtado 47'	Summary	Asante 13'; Kassi 31', 76'; El Ghanassy 65' (pen.)	Stadium: Isachsen Stadion; Attendance: 2,272; Referee: Andres Johansen

18 October 2015 27	Molde	3–1	Mjøndalen	Molde
15:30 CEST (UTC+2)	Kamara 54'; Svendsen 63'; Singh 86'	Summary	Nguen 79'	Stadium: Aker Stadion; Attendance: 8,141; Referee: Trygve Kjensli

23 October 2015 28	Start	1–1	Mjøndalen	Kristiansand
19:00 CEST (UTC+2)	Aase 60'; Kristjánsson (yellow card) 63'	Summary	Sundli 20'	Stadium: Sør Arena; Attendance: 8,854; Referee: Svein Oddvar Moen

1 November 2015 29	Mjøndalen	1–2	Aalesund	Mjøndalen
18:00 CET (UTC+1)	Sundli (yellow card) 54'; Gauseth (yellow card) 66'; Nguen 90+1'	Summary	James 35'; Lie (yellow card) 74'; Þrándarson 90+4'	Stadium: Isachsen Stadion; Attendance: 2,912; Referee: Martin Lundby

8 November 2015 30	Viking	3–1	Mjøndalen	Stavanger
18:00 CET (UTC+1)	Bytyqi 67'; Haugen 81'; Adegbenro 90+1'	Summary	Midtgarden 8'; Olsen (yellow card) 19'; Kapidžić (yellow card) 47'; Sundli (yellow card) 51'	Stadium: Viking Stadion; Attendance: 10,623; Referee: Svein-Erik Edvartsen

==== Table ====
Pos	Team	Pld	W	D	L	GF	GA	GD	Pts	Qualification or relegation
12	Haugesund	30	8	7	15	33	52	−19	31	
13	Tromsø	30	7	8	15	36	50	−14	29	
14	Start (O)	30	5	7	18	35	64	−29	22	Qualification for the relegation play-offs
15	Mjøndalen (R)	30	4	9	17	38	69	−31	21	Relegation to First Division
16	Sandefjord (R)	30	4	4	22	36	68	−32	16	Relegation to First Division

Source: Football Association of Norway (in Norwegian), Soccerway
Rules for classification: 1) Points; 2) Goal difference; 3) Goals scored; 4) Head-to-head points; 5) Head-to-head goal difference; 6) Head-to-head away goals scored (between two teams).
(O) Play-off winners; (R) Relegated

=== Norwegian Cup ===
22 April 2015 First Round	Vestfossen	0–7	Mjøndalen	Vestfossen
18:00 CEST (UTC+2)	V.A.Heien (yellow card) 30'; P.Monga (yellow card) 70'; P.Mett-Lund (yellow card) 70'; R.Hvambsal (yellow card) 87'	Summary	Ingebretsen 14', 77'; Nilsen 26'; Sosseh 29', 55', 71'; J.S.Olsen 61' (pen.)	Stadium: Strandajordet Kunstgress; Attendance: 1,024; Referee: Ole-Martin Loeshagen

6 May 2015 Second Round	Ørn-Horten	2–2 (a.e.t.) (3–4 p)	Mjøndalen	Horten
18:00 CEST (UTC+2)	T.Knutsen 31' (pen.); A.Teklamariam 55' (yellow card) 63'; K.Silberg (yellow card) 114'	Summary	J.S.Olsen 15' (pen.); Bernstein (red card) 29'; Diop (yellow card) 39'; Gauseth 72'; Hansen (yellow card) 76'	Stadium: Lystlunden; Attendance: 428; Referee: Ole-Martin Loeshagen
	Penalties
	K.Silberg (penalty scored); T.Knutsen (penalty scored); T.Hem (penalty missed); L.Rustad (penalty scored); M.Berntzen (penalty missed)		(penalty missed) J.S.Olsen; (penalty scored) Sosseh; (penalty scored) Gauseth; (penalty scored) Kapidžić; (penalty scored) M.S.Olsen

3 June 2015 Third round	Notodden	1–4	Mjøndalen	Notodden
18:00 CEST (UTC+2)	E.Rosland (yellow card) 41'; A.Čorović (yellow card) 58'; T.Kaven 82'	Summary	Gauseth 26' (pen.); Sosseh 29'; Nilsen (yellow card) 71'; J.S.Olsen 72'; Kapidžić 80'	Stadium: Notodden Stadion; Attendance: 1,015; Referee: Espen A. Eskandari

24 June 2015 Fourth round	Mjøndalen	4–0	Hødd	Mjøndalen
19:00 CEST (UTC+2)	Aasmundsen 26'; Kapidžić 37'; Midtgarden 55'; J.S.Olsen (yellow card) 57'; Gauseth (yellow card) 72'; Törnqvist 75' (o.g.)	Summary	Aursnes (yellow card) 87'	Stadium: Isachsen Stadion; Attendance: 1,313; Referee: Ken Henry Johnsen

13 August 2015 Quarterfinal	Rosenborg	4–0	Mjøndalen	Trondheim
19:35 CEST (UTC+2)	Søderlund 16' de Lanlay 28'; Vilhjálmsson 34'; Helland 59'	Summary	Hansen (yellow card) 47'	Stadium: Lerkendal Stadion; Attendance: 7,736; Referee: Ola Hobber Nilsen

== Squad statistics ==
As of match played 8 November 2015

=== Appearances and goals ===
No.	Pos	Nat	Player	Total		Tippeligaen		Norwegian Cup	
No.	Pos	Nat	Player	Apps	Goals	Apps	Goals	Apps	Goals
1	GK	(Norway) NOR	Ivar Andreas Forn	23	0	20+1	0	2	0
2	DF	(Norway) NOR	Ulrik Arneberg	33	1	29	1	4	0
3	DF	(Norway) NOR	Joachim Solberg Olsen	32	4	28	1	4	3
4	DF	(Norway) NOR	Martin Strange	12	0	4+5	0	3	0
5	DF	(Norway) NOR	Karanveer Grewal	7	0	4+2	0	1	0
6	MF	(New Zealand) NZL	Craig Henderson	7	1	5+2	1	0	0
7	FW	(Denmark) DEN	Sanel Kapidžić	32	6	19+9	4	3+1	2
8	MF	(Norway) NOR	Stian Rasch	10	0	3+4	0	2+1	0
9	MF	(Norway) NOR	Mads Hansen	34	1	30	1	3+1	0
10	MF	(Norway) NOR	Erik Midtgarden	27	5	23+1	4	2+1	1
11	MF	(Norway) NOR	Christian Gauseth	32	6	28	4	3+1	2
14	MF	(Ivory Coast) CIV	Vamouti Diomande	3	0	3	0	0	0
15	MF	(Norway) NOR	Stian Aasmundsen	26	4	24	3	2	1
16	MF	(Norway) NOR	Mads Gundersen	21	2	13+5	2	1+2	0
17	FW	(Norway) NOR	Amahl Pellegrino	12	1	8+3	1	1	0
18	DF	(United States) USA	Rhett Bernstein	23	5	13+7	5	2+1	0
19	MF	(Norway) NOR	Tokmac Nguen	6	2	2+4	2	0	0
20	FW	(Senegal) SEN	Ousseynou Boye	3	0	1+2	0	0	0
21	MF	(Norway) NOR	Magnus Sylling Olsen	25	2	15+7	2	2+1	0
22	DF	(Norway) NOR	Morten Sundli	25	4	23	4	2	0
23	FW	(United States) USA	Erik Hurtado	11	1	6+4	1	1	0
24	MF	(Norway) NOR	Henrik Gulden	4	0	2+2	0	0	0
25	MF	(Norway) NOR	Hallvard Håskjold	1	0	0	0	0+1	0
30	GK	(Denmark) DEN	Marco Pris Jørgensen	11	0	10	0	1	0
	DF	(Norway) NOR	Kasim Al	1	0	0	0	0+1	0
	MF	(Norway) NOR	Andreas Bråtun	1	0	0	0	0+1	0
	MF	(Norway) NOR	Andreas Sivertsen	1	0	0	0	0+1	0
Players away from Mjøndalen on loan:
6	MF	(Norway) NOR	Michael Stilson	8	0	1+4	0	2+1	0
17	MF	(Norway) NOR	Erlend Skagestad	1	0	0	0	1	0
23	FW	(Norway) NOR	Tim André Nilsen	14	2	1+10	1	3	1
Players who appeared for Mjøndalen no longer at the club:
6	MF	(Norway) NOR	Bjarne Kortgaard Ingebretsen	1	2	0	0	1	2
12	GK	(Norway) NOR	Andreas Håskjold	2	0	0	0	2	0
19	DF	(Norway) NOR	Joakim Mohn Rishovd	1	0	0	0	0+1	0
20	FW	(The Gambia) GAM	Alagie Sosseh	18	5	7+7	1	4	4
24	MF	(Senegal) SEN	Amidou Diop	13	0	8+2	0	3	0

=== Goal scorers ===
Place	Position	Nation	Number	Name	Tippeligaen	Norwegian Cup	Total
1	MF	(Norway)	11	Christian Gauseth	4	2	6
1	FW	(Denmark)	7	Sanel Kapidžić	4	2	6
3	DF	(United States)	18	Rhett Bernstein	5	0	5
3	MF	(Norway)	10	Erik Midtgarden	4	1	5
3	FW	(The Gambia)	20	Alagie Sosseh	1	4	5
6	DF	(Norway)	22	Morten Sundli	4	0	4
6	MF	(Norway)	15	Stian Aasmundsen	3	1	4
6	DF	(Norway)	3	Joachim Solberg Olsen	1	3	4
9	MF	(Norway)	16	Mads Gundersen	2	0	2
9	MF	(Norway)	21	Magnus Sylling Olsen	2	0	2
9	MF	(Norway)	19	Tokmac Nguen	2	0	2
9	FW	(Norway)	23	Tim André Nilsen	1	1	2
9	MF	(Norway)	6	Bjarne Kortgaard Ingebretsen	0	2	2
14	MF	(Norway)	9	Mads Hansen	1	0	1
14	DF	(Norway)	2	Ulrik Arneberg	1	0	1
14	MF	(New Zealand)	6	Craig Henderson	1	0	1
14	FW	(Norway)	17	Amahl Pellegrino	1	0	1
14	FW	(United States)	23	Erik Hurtado	1	0	1
14				Own goal	0	1	1
				TOTALS	38	17	55

=== Disciplinary record ===
Number	Nation	Position	Name	Tippeligaen		Norwegian Cup		Total	
Number	Nation	Position	Name	Yellow card	Red card	Yellow card	Red card	Yellow card	Red card
1	(Norway)	GK	Ivar Andreas Forn	1	0	0	0	1	0
2	(Norway)	DF	Ulrik Arneberg	4	0	0	0	4	0
3	(Norway)	DF	Joachim Solberg Olsen	6	0	1	0	7	0
4	(Norway)	DF	Martin Strange	1	0	0	0	1	0
5	(Norway)	DF	Karanveer Grewal	2	1	0	0	2	1
6	(Norway)	MF	Michael Stilson	1	0	0	0	1	0
7	(Denmark)	FW	Sanel Kapidžić	4	0	0	0	4	0
9	(Norway)	MF	Mads Hansen	0	0	2	0	2	0
10	(Norway)	MF	Erik Midtgarden	1	0	0	0	1	0
11	(Norway)	MF	Christian Gauseth	5	0	1	0	6	0
15	(Norway)	MF	Stian Aasmundsen	7	1	0	0	7	1
16	(Norway)	MF	Mads Gundersen	4	0	0	0	4	0
18	(United States)	DF	Rhett Bernstein	1	0	0	1	1	1
20	(The Gambia)	FW	Alagie Sosseh	2	0	0	0	2	0
21	(Norway)	MF	Magnus Sylling Olsen	7	0	0	0	7	0
22	(Norway)	DF	Morten Sundli	5	0	0	0	5	0
23	(Norway)	FW	Tim André Nilsen	0	0	1	0	1	0
23	(United States)	FW	Erik Hurtado	1	0	0	0	1	0
24	(Senegal)	MF	Amidou Diop	1	0	1	0	2	0
			TOTALS	53	2	6	1	59	3
