= 2017 Norwegian First Division =

1. divisjon
- Season: 2017
- Dates: 2 April – 5 November
- Champions: Bodø/Glimt
- Promoted: Bodø/Glimt; Start; Ranheim
- Relegated: Fredrikstad; Elverum; Arendal
- Matches: 240
- Goals: 736 (3.07 per match)
- Top goalscorer: Kristian Fardal Opseth (28 goals)
- Biggest home win: Ullensaker/Kisa 7–1 Jerv
- Biggest away win: Strømmen 1–6 Bodø/Glimt
- Highest scoring: Ullensaker/Kisa 7–1 Jerv
- Longest winning run: 5 games Bodø/Glimt
- Longest unbeaten run: 15 games Bodø/Glimt
- Longest winless run: 11 games Arendal
- Longest losing run: 4 games Fredrikstad
- Average attendance: 1,422 ▼4.9%

The 2017 1. divisjon (referred to as OBOS-ligaen for sponsorship reasons) was a Norwegian second-tier football league season.

The first round of the season was played on 2 April 2017 and the season concluded with the last round on 5 November 2017.

== Team changes from 2016 ==
In the 2016 1. divisjon, Kristiansund and Sandefjord were promoted to the 2017 Eliteserien, while Bryne, Hødd, KFUM Oslo and Raufoss were relegated to the 2017 2. divisjon.

Bodø/Glimt and Start were relegated from the 2016 Tippeligaen, while Tromsdalen, Elverum, Florø and Arendal were promoted from the 2016 2. divisjon.

== Teams ==
Locations of the teams in the 2017 OBOS-ligaen

Team	Location	Arena	Capacity	Manager
Arendal	Arendal	Bjønnes Stadion	1,500	(Sweden) Mattias Andersson
Åsane	Åsane	Åsane Idrettspark	3,000	(Norway) Mons Ivar Mjelde
Bodø/Glimt	Bodø	Aspmyra Stadion	7,354	(Norway) Aasmund Bjørkan
Elverum	Elverum	Elverum Stadion	1,400	(Norway) Tore Fossum
Fredrikstad	Fredrikstad	Fredrikstad Stadion	12,565	(Norway) Bjørn Petter Ingebretsen
Florø	Florø	Florø Stadion	2,800	(Norway) Terje Rognsø
Jerv	Grimstad	J.J. Ugland Stadion – Levermyr	1,750	(Norway) Arne Sandstø
Kongsvinger	Kongsvinger	Gjemselund Stadion	6,700	(Norway) Hans-Erik Eriksen
Levanger	Levanger	Moan Fritidspark	6,000	(Sweden) Magnus Powell
Mjøndalen	Mjøndalen	Isachsen Stadion	4,350	(Norway) Vegard Hansen
Ranheim	Trondheim	EXTRA Arena	3,000	(Norway) Svein Maalen
Sandnes Ulf	Sandnes	Sandnes Idrettspark	4,969	(Norway) Bengt Sæternes
Start	Kristiansand	Sør Arena	14,563	(England) Mick Priest
Strømmen	Strømmen	Strømmen Stadion	1,800	(Norway) Espen Olsen
Tromsdalen	Tromsdalen	Tromsdalen Stadion	3,000	(Norway) Gaute Helstrup
Ull/Kisa	Jessheim	UKI Arena	3,000	(Norway) Vegard Skogheim

=== Managerial changes ===
Team	Outgoing manager	Manner of departure	Date of vacancy	Table	Incoming manager	Date of appointment	Table
Fredrikstad	(Norway) Mons Ivar Mjelde	Resigned	4 November 2016	Pre-season	(Italy) Andrea Loberto	23 November 2016	Pre-season
Åsane	(Norway) Kjetil Knutsen	Contract expired	1 December 2016	Pre-season	(Norway) Mons Ivar Mjelde	1 December 2016	Pre-season
Arendal	(Norway) Knut Tørum	Sacked	12 June 2017	16th	(Sweden) Mattias Andersson	12 June 2017	16th
Start	(Norway) Steinar Pedersen	Sacked	29 September 2017	2nd	(England) Mick Priest (interim)	29 September 2017	2nd
Fredrikstad	(Italy) Andrea Loberto	Resigned	27 October 2017	14th	(Norway) Aleksander Olsen (interim)	27 October 2017	14th
Fredrikstad	(Norway) Aleksander Olsen	End of caretaker spell	29 October 2017	15th	(Norway) Bjørn Petter Ingebretsen	29 October 2017	15th

== League table ==
Pos	Team	Pld	W	D	L	GF	GA	GD	Pts	Promotion, qualification or relegation
1	Bodø/Glimt (C, P)	30	22	5	3	83	33	+50	71	Promotion to Eliteserien
2	Start (P)	30	16	7	7	57	36	+21	55	Promotion to Eliteserien
3	Mjøndalen	30	15	7	8	56	37	+19	52	Qualification for the promotion play-offs
4	Ranheim (O, P)	30	15	7	8	48	39	+9	52	Qualification for the promotion play-offs
5	Sandnes Ulf	30	14	9	7	44	39	+5	51	Qualification for the promotion play-offs
6	Ull/Kisa	30	15	3	12	61	55	+6	48	Qualification for the promotion play-offs
7	Levanger	30	10	12	8	39	36	+3	42	
8	Florø	30	10	8	12	42	46	−4	38	
9	Tromsdalen	30	9	10	11	43	43	0	37	
10	Kongsvinger	30	10	6	14	47	46	+1	36	
11	Strømmen	30	9	9	12	39	47	−8	36	
12	Åsane	30	7	12	11	38	56	−18	33	
13	Jerv	30	8	8	14	44	59	−15	32	
14	Fredrikstad (R)	30	5	11	14	33	51	−18	26	Qualification for the relegation play-offs
15	Elverum (R)	30	4	12	14	29	51	−22	24	Relegation to Second Division
16	Arendal (R)	30	5	6	19	33	62	−29	21	Relegation to Second Division

Source: nifs.no (in Norwegian), Soccerway
Rules for classification: 1) Points; 2) Goal difference; 3) Goals scored; 4) Head-to-head points; 5) Head-to-head goal difference; 6) Head-to-head away goals scored (only if between two teams); 7) Head-to-head goals scored; 8) Play-off (only used to decide champions or relegation).
(C) Champions; (O) Play-off winners; (P) Promoted; (R) Relegated

== Results ==
Home \ Away	ARE	B/G	ELV	FLO	FFK	JER	KIL	LEV	MIF	RAN	ULF	IKS	STR	TUIL	UKI	ÅSF
Arendal	—	1–3	0–3	2–0	1–1	1–1	3–0	0–3	0–1	1–2	2–3	0–2	0–3	1–2	1–2	0–1
Bodø/Glimt	5–0	—	5–0	4–1	4–0	4–0	3–2	1–3	1–0	3–3	0–0	3–2	4–3	1–0	3–1	6–0
Elverum	5–0	0–4	—	3–4	1–1	2–3	1–2	0–2	0–3	1–1	0–1	1–1	2–1	1–1	0–3	0–0
Florø	0–1	1–2	1–1	—	4–1	1–1	1–0	0–0	5–0	1–1	3–1	1–4	1–5	1–1	3–1	1–1
Fredrikstad	1–1	0–1	4–0	1–2	—	1–1	1–1	0–0	1–1	1–2	3–0	2–1	1–1	2–1	1–2	2–1
Jerv	2–3	1–4	2–0	0–2	2–0	—	2–2	2–2	0–1	1–2	2–0	1–3	0–1	1–1	6–2	1–1
Kongsvinger	2–3	0–1	1–1	2–1	3–2	6–1	—	0–1	3–2	0–0	2–3	0–2	0–0	0–1	1–3	2–0
Levanger	3–2	1–1	1–1	1–1	3–1	0–1	2–1	—	1–1	1–1	0–1	0–0	0–1	0–3	2–0	3–0
Mjøndalen	2–1	1–2	2–2	2–4	3–1	3–0	5–1	3–1	—	3–0	2–2	2–1	3–0	2–0	3–1	3–0
Ranheim	2–1	2–1	2–2	0–2	1–0	3–1	1–0	6–1	1–1	—	0–1	1–0	1–0	3–1	3–4	2–1
Sandnes Ulf	2–2	3–0	2–0	3–0	0–0	0–3	0–3	2–2	1–0	2–0	—	1–1	2–0	2–0	0–0	3–3
Start	3–1	2–2	0–1	2–0	2–2	3–2	2–1	1–1	2–1	4–2	2–1	—	0–1	2–2	3–1	4–0
Strømmen	1–0	1–6	0–0	1–1	4–1	2–1	0–4	0–1	2–2	1–0	1–3	1–2	—	1–1	3–4	2–2
Tromsdalen	1–1	2–3	1–1	1–0	5–0	1–4	2–2	2–1	2–1	3–2	1–2	1–2	1–1	—	2–3	2–0
Ull/Kisa	4–2	2–5	2–0	3–0	2–1	7–1	0–3	2–2	0–1	0–1	3–3	1–2	2–0	1–0	—	2–3
Åsane	2–2	1–1	1–0	1–0	1–1	1–1	2–3	2–1	2–2	1–3	4–0	3–2	2–2	2–2	0–3	—

Source: NIFS (in Norwegian)
Legend: Blue = home team win; Yellow = draw; Red = away team win.

== Promotion play-offs ==
The third to sixth-placed teams took part in the promotion play-offs; these were single leg knockout matches, two semi-finals and a final. The winners, Ranheim, advanced to play the 14th placed team in Eliteserien over two legs in the Eliteserien play-offs for a spot in the top-flight next season.

=== Semi-finals ===
11 November 2017
15:00 CET (UTC+1)

Mjøndalen	3–1	Ull/Kisa
Gauseth 13' (pen.); Fredriksen 21'; Pellegrino 40'	Summary	Andreas Aalbu 38'

Isachsen Stadion, Mjøndalen
Attendance: 1,723
Referee: Tommy Skjerven
12 November 2017
15:00 CET (UTC+1)

Ranheim	1–0	Sandnes Ulf
Lillebo 77'	Summary

EXTRA Arena, Ranheim
Attendance: 585
Referee: Trygve Kjensli

=== Final ===
19 November 2017
14:00 CET (UTC+1)

Mjøndalen	1–2	Ranheim
Pellegrino 61'	Summary	Karlsen 16'; Reginiussen 80'

Isachsen Stadion, Mjøndalen
Attendance: 1,748
Referee: Sigurd Kringstad

== Relegation play-offs ==
The 14th placed team took part in a two-legged play-off against Notodden, the winners of the 2. divisjon play-offs, to decide who would play in the 2018 OBOS-ligaen.

12 November 2017
18:00 CET (UTC+1)

Fredrikstad	0–0	Notodden
	Summary

Fredrikstad Stadion, Fredrikstad
Attendance: 5,340
Referee: Christian Moen
18 November 2017
18:00 CET (UTC+1)

Notodden	5–3	Fredrikstad
Hustad 7'; Jenssen 22'; Holmen 24'; Mbedule 28'; Midtgarden 69'	Summary	Kapidžić 38'; Leko 76', 83'

Idrettsparken, Notodden
Attendance: 2,105
Referee: Torkjell Trædal

Notodden won 5–3 on aggregate.

== Season statistics ==
=== Top scorers ===
Rank	Player	Club	Goals	Games	Average
1	(Norway) Kristian Fardal Opseth	Bodø/Glimt	28	30	0,93
2	(Norway) Amahl Pellegrino	Mjøndalen	18	29	0,62
3	(Norway) Robert Stene	Levanger	15	28	0,54
3	(Norway) Kent Håvard Eriksen	Sandnes Ulf	15	30	0,50
5	(Norway) Endre Kupen	Florø	14	23	0,61
5	(Senegal) Ousseynou Boye	Mjøndalen	14	25	0,56
7	(Norway) Ulrik Saltnes	Bodø/Glimt	13	27	0,48
8	(Norway) Niklas Castro	Kongsvinger	12	25	0,48
8	(Norway) Kristoffer Ødemarksbakken	Ullensaker/Kisa	12	29	0,41
10	(Norway) Niklas Sandberg	Ullensaker/Kisa	11	26	0,42
10	(Norway) Geir André Herrem	Åsane	11	27	0,41
10	(Norway) Nicolay Solberg	Ullensaker/Kisa	11	27	0,41
10	(Norway) Kjell Rune Sellin	Sandnes Ulf	11	29	0,38
10	(Denmark) Sanel Kapidzic	Fredrikstad	11	29	0,38
15	(Norway) Steffen Lie Skålevik	Start	10	11	0,91
15	(Norway) Adem Güven	Kongsvinger	10	24	0,42
15	(Norway) Trond Olsen	Bodø/Glimt	10	27	0,37
15	(Norway) Mads Reginiussen	Ranheim	10	29	0,34
