= Ivar Andreas Forn =

Norwegian footballer (born 1983)

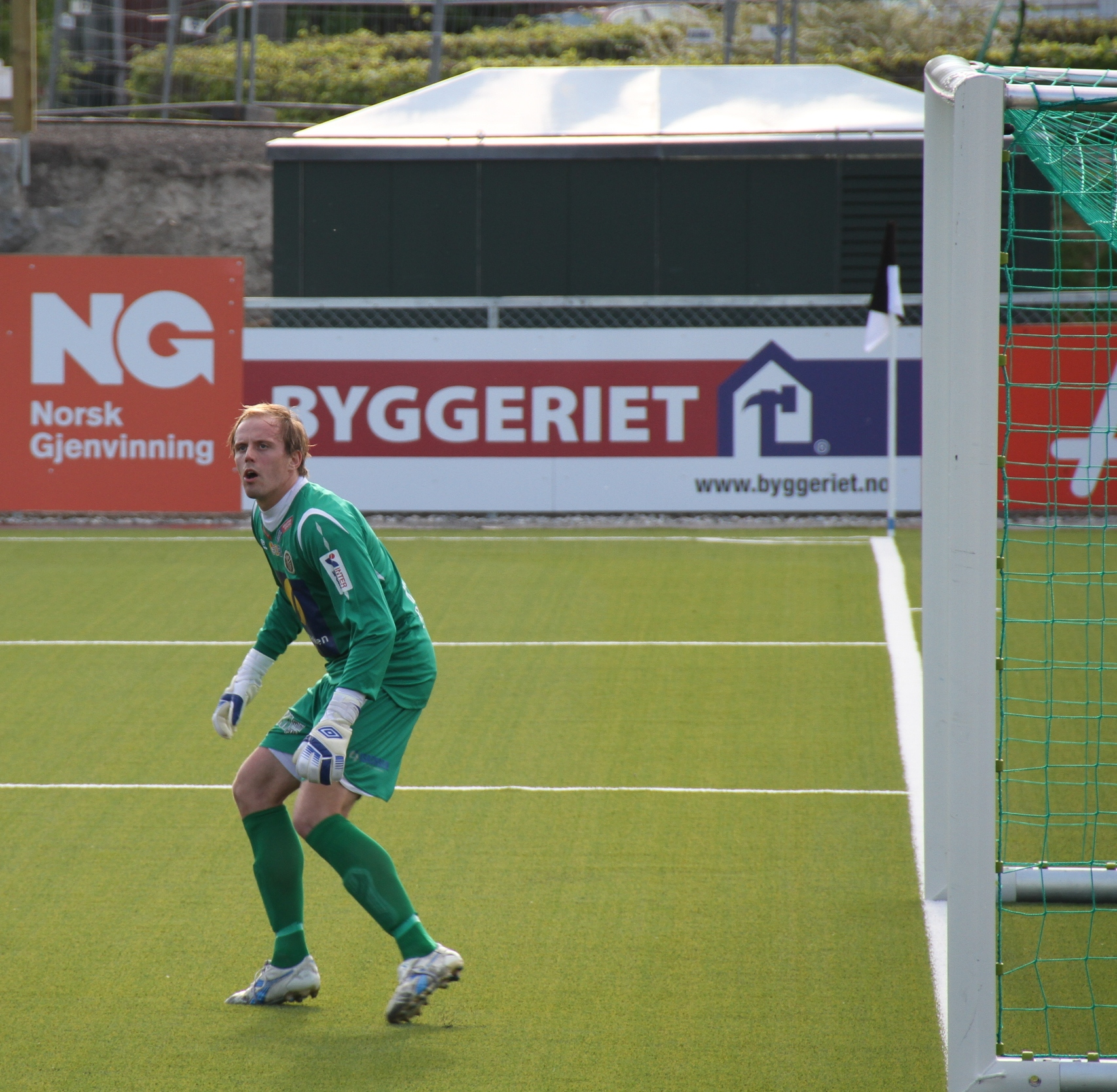

Personal information
- Date of birth: 24 June 1983 (age 43)
- Place of birth: Kvæfjord, Norway
- Height: 1.93 m (6 ft 4 in)
- Position: Goalkeeper

Youth career
- Kvæfjord

Senior career*
Years	Team	Apps	(Gls)
–2007	Harstad		
2008–2011	Bodø/Glimt	6	(0)
2009	→ Alta (loan)	3	(0)
2012–2016	Mjøndalen	100	(0)
- * Club domestic league appearances and goals as of 16 August 2015

Ivar Andreas Forn (born 24 June 1983) is a retired Norwegian football goalkeeper.

Personal and Professional life

 UiT- The Arctic University of Norway 
 Master i rettsvitenskap, Jus (2012 - 2019) 
 Grad: Cand.jur.
 Handelshøgskolen i Bodø 
 Master of Science, Økonomistyring + Finans (2007 - 2009) 
 Grad: Siviløkonom

Harstad University College (HiH) Bachelor i Bedriftsøkonomi (2003 - 2006)

Assosiert partner, Arctic Investment Group (Feb 2023 - Present, 1 yr 8 mos) Daglig leder/CEO, Øksheim R AS (Oct 2022 - Present, 2 yrs)

== Football career ==
Forn hails from Kvæfjord Municipality and played for Harstad IL before joining FK Bodø/Glimt ahead of the 2008 season. He did not establish himself in the first team, and was in 2009 loaned out to Alta IF. In 2012, he joined Mjøndalen IF, and eventually played as a first-choice goalkeeper in their 2015 Tippeligaen stint. On 3 May 2016 he retired from football on top level.

== Career statistics ==
As of 22 May 2016

Season	Club	Division	League		Cup		Total	
Season	Club	Division	Apps	Goals	Apps	Goals	Apps	Goals
2008	Bodø/Glimt	Tippeligaen	0	0	1	0	1	0
2009	Alta	Adeccoligaen	3	0	0	0	3	0
2010	Bodø/Glimt	Adeccoligaen	3	0	0	0	3	0
2011	Bodø/Glimt	Adeccoligaen	3	0	1	0	4	0
2012	Mjøndalen	Adeccoligaen	27	0	3	0	30	0
2013	Mjøndalen	Adeccoligaen	22	0	3	0	25	0
2014	Mjøndalen	1. divisjon	30	0	4	0	34	0
2015	Mjøndalen	Tippeligaen	21	0	2	0	23	0
2016	Mjøndalen	OBOS-ligaen	0	0	2	0	2	0
Career Total			109	0	16	0	125	0
