= Karanveer Singh Grewal =

Indian-born Norwegian footballer (born 1993)

Personal information
- Date of birth: 23 April 1993 (age 33)
- Place of birth: Lambha, India
- Height: 1.72 m (5 ft 8 in)
- Position: Defender

Team information
- Current team: Åskollen
- Number: 28

Youth career
- Lier
- Strømsgodset

Senior career*
Years	Team	Apps	(Gls)
2012	Strømsgodset	1	(0)
2013–2017	Mjøndalen	40	(0)
2013	→ Asker (loan)	3	(0)
2017–2018	Asker	23	(0)
2019–	Åskollen	6	(0)

International career^{‡}
2012	Norway U19	2	(0)
- * Club domestic league appearances and goals as of 22 July 2019 ‡ National team caps and goals as of 22 July 2019

Karanveer "Kinni" Singh Grewal (born 24 April 1993) is a professional footballer who plays as a defender. He is currently playing for Åskollen in the Norwegian lower leagues.

== Club career ==
Grewal grew up in Tranby and started his career in Lier IL. He made his debut for Strømsgodset's first team in 2012, when he made one appearance in Tippeligaen and two appearances in the Norwegian Cup, all as a substitute. He was not offered a new contract with Strømsgodset after the 2012 season, and joined Mjøndalen in February 2013. He joined the 2. divisjon side Asker on loan for the rest of the season in July 2013. In 2014 Grewal and Mjøndalen won promotion to Tippeligaen.

Grewal left the club in the winter market 2016/17.

== International career ==
Grewal made his debut for the Norwegian under-19 team in February 2012 as a substitute against Sweden (1–0). He managed one more appearance that year, coming on as a substitute against Ukraine (1–1) in April.

== Career statistics ==
As of 22 July 2019

Season	Club	Division	League		Cup		Total	
Season	Club	Division	Apps	Goals	Apps	Goals	Apps	Goals
2012	Strømsgodset	Tippeligaen	1	0	2	0	3	0
2013	Mjøndalen	Adeccoligaen	7	0	2	0	9	0
2013	Asker	2. divisjon	3	0	0	0	3	0
2014	Mjøndalen	1. divisjon	20	0	3	0	23	0
2015	Mjøndalen	Tippeligaen	6	0	1	0	7	0
2016	Mjøndalen	OBOS-ligaen	5	0	0	0	5	0
2017	Asker	PostNord-Ligaen	13	0	0	0	13	0
2018	Asker	PostNord-Ligaen	10	0	0	0	10	0
2019	Åskollen	5. divisjon	6	0	0	0	6	0
Career Total			71	0	8	0	79	0
