= Ulrik Arneberg (footballer) =

Norwegian footballer (born 1987)

Personal information
- Full name: Ulrik Ancher Henriksen Arneberg
- Date of birth: 22 July 1987 (age 39)
- Height: 1.88 m (6 ft 2 in)
- Position: Centre back

Youth career
- Ready
- 2004–2005: Stabæk

Senior career*
Years	Team	Apps	(Gls)
2006–2007	Stabæk	1	(0)
2007	→ Skeid (loan)	30	(0)
2008–2013	Asker	143	(7)
2014–2017	Mjøndalen	115	(3)
2018–	Heggedal	8	(0)
- * Club domestic league appearances and goals

Ulrik Arneberg (born 22 July 1987) is a Norwegian football defender.

He joined the youth team of Stabæk from Ready ahead of the 2004 season. Ahead of the 2006 season he was drafted into the first team. He got two Norwegian Premier League games in 2006. In early 2007 he was loaned out to Skeid in the Norwegian First Division. Ahead of the 2008 season he joined Asker permanently. After many years there, captaining the team since 2009, he joined Mjøndalen IF ahead of the 2014 season.

== Career statistics ==
As of 29 October 2017

Season	Club	Division	League		Cup		Total	
Season	Club	Division	Apps	Goals	Apps	Goals	Apps	Goals
2006	Stabæk	Tippeligaen	1	0	2	0	3	0
2007	Skeid	Adeccoligaen	30	0	1	0	31	0
2008	Asker	2. divisjon	26	0	1	0	27	0
2009	Asker	2. divisjon	25	3	0	0	25	3
2010	Asker	2. divisjon	24	2	0	0	24	2
2011	Asker	Adeccoligaen	29	1	2	0	31	1
2012	Asker	2. divisjon	17	1	1	0	18	1
2013	Asker	2. divisjon	22	0	3	0	25	0
2014	Mjøndalen	1. divisjon	27	0	3	1	30	1
2015	Mjøndalen	Tippeligaen	29	1	4	0	33	1
2016	Mjøndalen	OBOS-ligaen	26	1	1	0	27	1
2017	Mjøndalen	OBOS-ligaen	27	0	1	0	28	0
Career Total			283	9	19	1	302	10
