= Morten Sundli =

Norwegian footballer (born 1990)

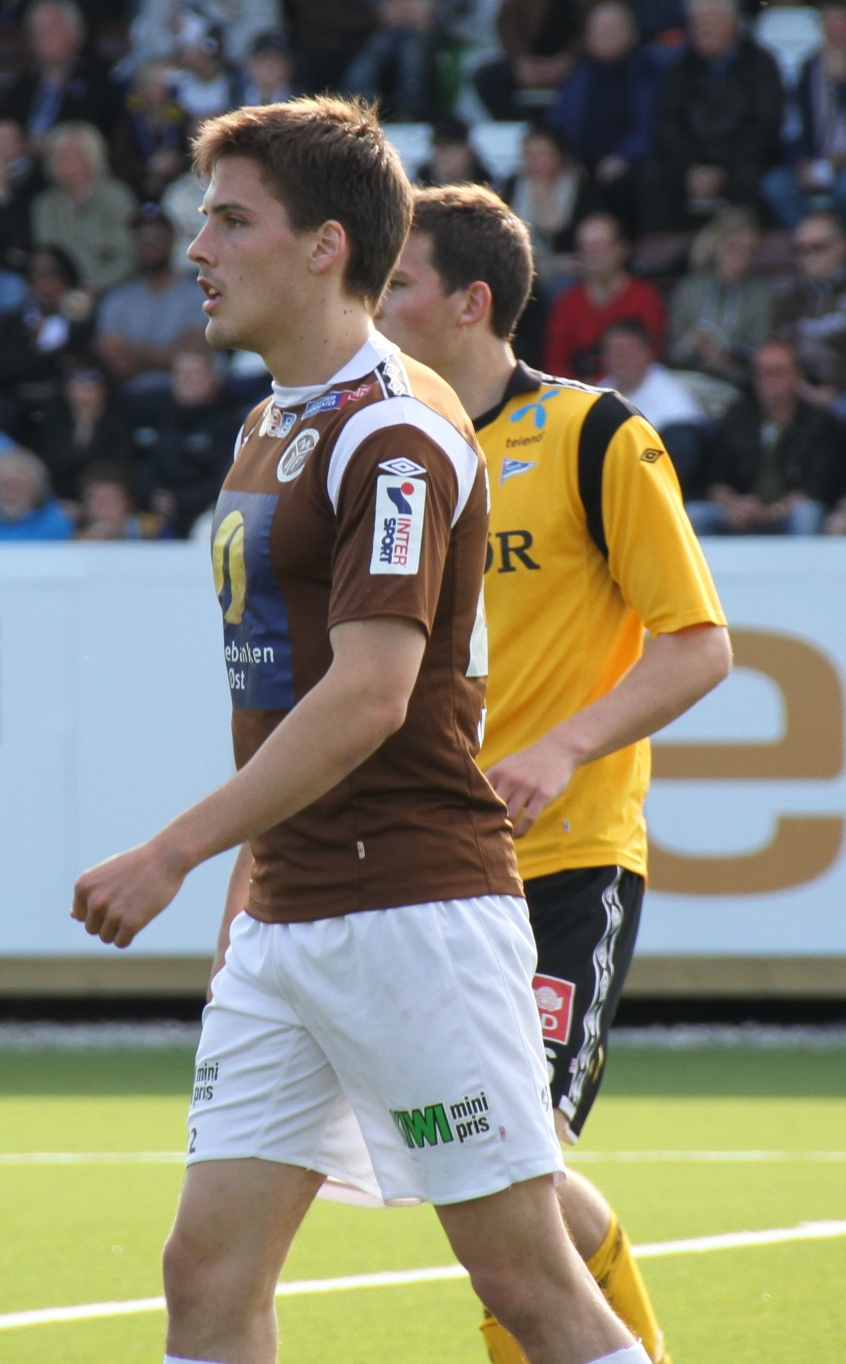
- Sundli with Mjøndalen in 2012

Personal information
- Full name: Morten Sundli
- Date of birth: 31 March 1990 (age 36)
- Place of birth: Lillehammer, Norway
- Height: 1.88 m (6 ft 2 in)
- Position: Defender

Youth career
- Roterud
- FF Lillehammer

Senior career*
Years	Team	Apps	(Gls)
–2008	FF Lillehammer		
2009–2010	Odd	8	(0)
2011–2016	Mjøndalen	159	(11)
2016–2017	Sarpsborg 08	5	(1)
2017	Östers	6	(0)
2018–2021	Ullensaker/Kisa	81	(6)
- * Club domestic league appearances and goals as of 16 May 2021

Morten Sundli (born 31 March 1990) is a Norwegian footballer who plays for Ullensaker/Kisa.

He started his youth career in Roterud, and played youth and senior football for FF Lillehammer before being signed by Odds BK ahead of the 2009 season.

== Career statistics ==
Season	Club	Division	League		Cup		Total	
Season	Club	Division	Apps	Goals	Apps	Goals	Apps	Goals
2009	Odd	Tippeligaen	0	0	1	1	1	1
2010	Odd	Tippeligaen	8	0	1	1	9	1
2011	Mjøndalen	Adeccoligaen	30	0	3	0	33	0
2012	Mjøndalen	Adeccoligaen	30	1	2	0	32	1
2013	Mjøndalen	Adeccoligaen	28	1	5	0	33	1
2014	Mjøndalen	1. divisjon	29	5	3	0	32	5
2015	Mjøndalen	Tippeligaen	23	4	2	0	25	4
2016	Mjøndalen	OBOS-ligaen	19	0	2	0	21	0
2016	Sarpsborg 08	Tippeligaen	5	1	1	0	6	1
2017	Östers	Superettan	6	0	0	0	6	0
2018	Ull/Kisa	OBOS-ligaen	30	1	2	0	32	1
2019	Ull/Kisa	OBOS-ligaen	23	1	2	0	25	1
2020	Ull/Kisa	OBOS-ligaen	28	4	0	0	28	4
2021	Ull/Kisa	OBOS-ligaen	0	0	0	0	0	0
Career Total			259	18	24	2	283	20
