= Stian Aasmundsen =

Norwegian footballer (born 1989)

Personal information
- Full name: Stian Semb Aasmundsen
- Date of birth: 2 November 1989 (age 36)
- Place of birth: Tønsberg, Norway
- Height: 1.75 m (5 ft 9 in)
- Position: Midfielder

Youth career
- Eik-Tønsberg
- Tønsberg

Senior career*
Years	Team	Apps	(Gls)
2006–2012	Tønsberg	18	(0)
2013–2015	Mjøndalen	68	(7)
2016–2017	Jönköpings Södra	39	(2)
2018–2019	Kristiansund	27	(4)
2019–2021	Mjøndalen	79	(4)
2022–	Eik Tønsberg	56	(13)
- * Club domestic league appearances and goals as of 1 January 2025

Stian Semb Aasmundsen (born 2 November 1989) is a Norwegian football midfielder who currently plays for Eik Tønsberg.

== Career ==
He joined Mjøndalen from FK Tønsberg ahead of the 2013 season, and featured in their 2015 Tippeligaen campaign. Ahead of the 2016 season he went on to Swedish Allsvenskan club Jönköpings Södra IF. In December 2017 he returned to Norway, signing a two-year contract with Kristiansund. In March 2019, he returned to Mjøndalen. In January 2022, he joined Eik Tønsberg.

== Career statistics ==
As of match played 12 December 2021

Appearances and goals by club, season and competition
Club	Season	League			Cup		Other		Total	
Club	Season	Division	Apps	Goals	Apps	Goals	Apps	Goals	Apps	Goals
Mjøndalen	2013	1. divisjon	24	2	4	0	2 (Note: Appearances in promotion play-offs)	0	30	2
Mjøndalen	2014	1. divisjon	20	2	3	1	4	0	27	3
Mjøndalen	2015	Eliteserien	24	3	2	1	—		26	4
Mjøndalen	Total		68	7	9	2	6	0	83	9
Jönköpings Södra	2016	Allsvenskan	15	1	4	0	—		19	1
Jönköpings Södra	2017	Allsvenskan	24	1	0	0	2 (Note: Appearance(s) in relegation play-offs)	0	26	1
Jönköpings Södra	Total		39	2	4	0	2	0	45	2
Kristiansund	2018	Eliteserien	27	4	2	0	—		29	4
Mjøndalen	2019	Eliteserien	29	3	4	2	—		33	5
Mjøndalen	2020	Eliteserien	27	1	—		1	0	28	1
Mjøndalen	2021	Eliteserien	23	0	3	1	—		26	1
Mjøndalen	Total		79	4	7	3	1	0	87	7
Career total			213	17	22	5	9	0	244	22
