= Rhett Bernstein =

American soccer player (1987–2026)

Personal information
- Full name: Rhett Anthony Bernstein
- Date of birth: September 10, 1987
- Place of birth: San Diego, California, U.S.
- Date of death: July 7, 2026 (aged 38)
- Position: Defender

Youth career
- La Jolla Nomads

College career
Years	Team	Apps	(Gls)
2005–2008	Brown Bears		

Senior career*
Years	Team	Apps	(Gls)
2010	Sevilla FC Puerto Rico		
2011–2015	Mjøndalen IF	64	(5)
2016–2017	Miami FC	55	(1)
- * Club domestic league appearances and goals

Rhett Anthony Bernstein (September 10, 1987 – July 7, 2026) was an American soccer player. In 2009, he won the Hermann Trophy. He played for Sevilla FC Puerto Rico, Mjøndalen, and Miami FC.

== Club career ==
While playing soccer at Brown University, Bernstein was named to the 2008 Jewish Sports Review All-America First-Team, along with Zac MacMath and Daniel Steres. He was nominated twice for the Hermann Trophy, given to the best male college soccer player in America. In 2009, he won the Hermann Trophy.

He played for Team USA at the 2009 Maccabiah Games in Israel. The team finished fifth in the Games.

After graduating from Brown in 2009, Bernstein spent time in Israel, training with Maccabi Tel Aviv F.C.

Bernstein joined Sevilla FC Puerto Rico to participate in the SúperCopa DirecTV 2010 before moving to Europe.

Bernstein joined Mjøndalen's first-team squad ahead of the 2011 season. He scored his first goals for Mjøndalen against Tromsø on May 9, 2015. They won the game 4–3. Bernstein led Mjøndalen in scoring in 2015 with five goals from his center back position, which was also the most goals of all defenders in the Tippeligaen.

After five years in Norway, Bernstein signed with expansion Miami FC ahead of the 2016 North American Soccer League season. He chose uniform number 18, saying: "I want to wear number 18, Chai, meaning life [in Hebrew] to express both my strong Jewish identity as well as a long career with Miami FC."

== Personal life and death ==
Bernstein was born in San Diego, California, and was Jewish. As a teenager, he played soccer for the La Jolla Nomads. He attended University City High School in San Diego.

Bernstein died on July 7, 2026, at the age of 38.

== Career statistics ==
Appearances and goals by club, season and competition
Season	Club	League			League		Continental		Other		Total	
Season	Club	Division	Apps	Goals	Apps	Goals	Apps	Goals	Apps	Goals	Apps	Goals
Mjøndalen	2011	Adeccoligaen	1	0	0	0	—		—		1	0
Mjøndalen	2012	Adeccoligaen	22	0	3	0	—		1 (Note: Appearance(s) in promotion play-offs)	0	26	0
Mjøndalen	2013	Adeccoligaen	13	0	0	0	—		1	0	14	0
Mjøndalen	2014	1. divisjon	8	0	2	1	—		4	0	14	1
Mjøndalen	2015	Tippeligaen	20	5	3	0	—		—		23	5
Mjøndalen	Total		64	5	8	1	0	0	6	0	78	6

== See also ==
- List of select Jewish football (association; soccer) players
