= Bjarne Kortgaard Ingebretsen =

Norwegian footballer (born 1987)

Bjarne Ingebretsen
Personal information
- Full name: Bjarne Kortgaard Ingebretsen
- Date of birth: 10 October 1987 (age 39)
- Place of birth: Mjøndalen, Norway
- Height: 1.83 m (6 ft 0 in)
- Position: Midfielder

Youth career
- Mjøndalen
- 2002–2004: Lyn

Senior career*
Years	Team	Apps	(Gls)
2004–2008	Lyn	30	(3)
2007	→ Kongsvinger (loan)	8	(0)
2008	→ Nybergsund (loan)	23	(0)
2009–2010	Nybergsund	43	(2)
2011–2015	Mjøndalen	70	(21)
- * Club domestic league appearances and goals as of 22 November 2013

Bjarne Kortgaard Ingebretsen (born 10 October 1987) is a Norwegian football midfielder and assistant coach for Mjøndalen.

He joined Lyn from Mjøndalen IF in 2002, and made his Norwegian Premier League debut on 13 July 2004 against Viking FK. He stayed in Lyn for four seasons, but never broke into the first team. He was loaned out to Kongsvinger IL in 2007 and Nybergsund IL in 2008. Ahead of the 2009 season the move to Nybergsund IL was made permanent. He joined Mjøndalen in 2011, but retired due to injuries in 2014. However, he made a comeback in the following season, playing in a first round cup match for the same club.

In January 2015, he became assistant coach for Mjøndalen.

== Career statistics ==
Season	Club	Division	League		Cup		Total	
Season	Club	Division	Apps	Goals	Apps	Goals	Apps	Goals
2004	Lyn	Tippeligaen	3	0	1	0	4	0
2005	Lyn	Tippeligaen	12	3	0	0	12	3
2006	Lyn	Tippeligaen	11	0	0	0	11	0
2007	Lyn	Tippeligaen	4	0	0	0	4	0
2007	Kongsvinger	Adeccoligaen	8	0	0	0	8	0
2008	Nybergsund	Adeccoligaen	23	0	0	0	23	0
2009	Nybergsund	Adeccoligaen	22	1	0	0	22	1
2010	Nybergsund	Adeccoligaen	21	1	2	0	23	1
2011	Mjøndalen	Adeccoligaen	25	9	3	1	28	10
2012	Mjøndalen	Adeccoligaen	21	6	2	0	23	6
2013	Mjøndalen	Adeccoligaen	18	6	2	1	20	7
2014	Mjøndalen	Adeccoligaen	6	0	1	0	7	0
2015	Mjøndalen	Tippeligaen	0	0	1	1	1	1
Career Total			174	26	12	3	186	29
