= Erik Midtgarden =

Norwegian footballer (born 1987)

Personal information
- Full name: Erik Midtgarden
- Date of birth: 18 November 1987 (age 38)
- Place of birth: Skien, Norway
- Height: 1.86 m (6 ft 1 in)
- Positions: Centre-back; defensive midfielder; winger

Team information
- Current team: Konnerud

Senior career*
Years	Team	Apps	(Gls)
2005–2006	Odd Grenland	3	(0)
2006	→ Pors Grenland (loan)	26	(4)
2007–2008	Notodden	29	(2)
2009–2010	Mjøndalen	54	(22)
2011	Odd Grenland	14	(1)
2011	Vitesse Arnhem	0	(0)
2011	→ Flora Tallinn (loan)	13	(1)
2012	Lillestrøm	0	(0)
2012	→ Mjøndalen (loan)	14	(10)
2013	Hønefoss	19	(0)
2014–2016	Mjøndalen	81	(14)
2017–2019	Notodden	73	(22)
2020–2023	Åssiden	22	(2)
2023–2024	Eik Tønsberg	51	(14)
2025–2026	Mjøndalen	19	(0)
2026–	Konnerud	0	(0)

International career
2004	Norway U17	3	(0)
2005	Norway U18	10	(0)
2006–2007	Norway U21	2	(1)

Managerial career
- 2021-2022: Åssiden
- * Club domestic league appearances and goals as of 11 March 2026

Erik Midtgarden (born 18 November 1987) is a Norwegian footballer who plays as a midfielder for Norwegian Third Division club Konnerud. He has previously played for Tippeligaen sides Odd Grenland, Lillestrøm, Hønefoss and Mjøndalen and won the Meistriliiga with Flora Tallinn in 2011. Midtgarden has also spent time with the First Division sides Pors Grenland, Notodden (previous spell) and Mjøndalen (two previous spells). He has represented Norway at under-17, under-18 and under-21 level.

== Club career ==
Born in Skien, Midtgarden joined Odd Grenland's first-team squad ahead of the 2005 season. He made his debut in the first round of the 2005 Norwegian Football Cup match against Langesund/Stathelle, when he played the last 20 minutes as a winger and scored Odd's last goal in the 4–0 victory. He made three appearances for Odd in Tippeligaen in his first season at the club, and was the top goalscorer for the reserve team in the 2. divisjon with eleven goals. He spent the 2006 season on loan to Pors Grenland, where he was a regular for the team in the First Division. His contract with Odd expired after the season, and although the club wanted to renew his contract, Midtgarden chose to sign a two-year contract with the newly promoted First Division side Notodden, where he was promised regularly playing time.

After playing regularly for Notodden in 2007, Midtgarden was far away from the first team in the following season and wanted to leave the club when his contract expired after the 2008 season. He played a total of 29 league-matches for Notodden. He joined Mjøndalen ahead of the 2009 season, where the head coach Vegard Hansen used Midtgarden as a utility player. He was on a trial with Brighton & Hove Albion in July 2010, but was not offered a contract. Midtgarden scored 22 goals in 54 matches in his two seasons at Mjøndalen. His contract with Mjøndalen expired after the 2010 season, and in January 2010 he joined his old club Odd Grenland on a one-year contract.

Midtgarden played 14 matches for Odd in Tippeligaen in the first half of the 2012 season, and scored a goal in the 4–1 win against Sogndal on 3 April 2011 one minute after he replaced Håvard Storbæk as a substitute. In July 2011, he was bought by Dutch club Vitesse Arnhem, and was subsequently sent on loan to Estonian club Flora Tallinn, where he played 15 matches and won the 2011 Meistriliiga with the club. Midtgarden was supposed to return to Vitesse in January 2012, but when he did not get the payments as agreed in his contract, he decide to break the contract and move home to Norway, where he signed a one-year contract with Lillestrøm ahead of the 2012 season. After Magnus Haglund became head coach of Lillestrøm, the club bought several new players to the club, and Midtgarden became superfluous at the club. He was loaned out to Mjøndalen in August 2012, and scored a goal in his debut against Sandefjord on 10 August 2012. He scored 10 goals in 13 matches for Mjøndalen in the First Division in the 2012 season.

As a free agent, Midtgarden was on trials with Strømsgodset, Tromsø and Odd ahead of the 2013 season, before he signed for Hønefoss in February 2013. During his spell at Hønefoss, Midtgarden was mostly used as a substitute. After Hønefoss was relegated from Tippeligaen, he decided to return to Mjøndalen for his third spell at the club. He left ahead of the 2017, as the trainings became too difficult to combine with PE teacher studies at the Telemark University College, Notodden campus. He therefore rejoined Notodden FK.

== International career ==
Midtgarden has represented Norway at youth international level, and played three matches for the under-17 team in 2004 before he played 10 matches for the under-18 team the next year. He made his debut for the under-21 team on 5 October 2006 in a match against Denmark U21, where he scored one of the goals. He made one more appearance for the under-21 team, in February 2007 against Slovakia U21.

== Career statistics ==
As of 18 September 2019

Season	Club	Division	League		Cup		Total	
Season	Club	Division	Apps	Goals	Apps	Goals	Apps	Goals
2005	Odd Grenland	Tippeligaen	3	0	3	1	6	1
2006	Odd Grenland	Tippeligaen	0	0	1	0	1	0
2006	Pors Grenland	Adeccoligaen	26	4	0	0	26	4
2007	Notodden	Adeccoligaen	23	0	1	2	24	2
2008	Notodden	Adeccoligaen	6	2	0	0	6	2
2009	Mjøndalen	Adeccoligaen	28	10	1	0	29	10
2010	Mjøndalen	Adeccoligaen	26	12	3	1	29	13
2011	Odd Grenland	Tippeligaen	14	1	4	0	18	1
2011	Flora Tallinn	Meistriliiga	13	1	0	0	13	1
2012	Lillestrøm	Tippeligaen	0	0	0	0	0	0
2012	Mjøndalen	Adeccoligaen	14	10	0	0	14	10
2013	Hønefoss	Tippeligaen	19	0	2	0	21	0
2014	Mjøndalen	1. divisjon	27	2	4	1	31	3
2015	Mjøndalen	Tippeligaen	24	4	3	1	27	5
2016	Mjøndalen	OBOS-ligaen	30	8	1	0	31	8
2017	Notodden	PostNord-ligaen	26	11	3	2	29	13
2018	Notodden	OBOS-ligaen	30	10	2	0	32	10
2019	Notodden	OBOS-ligaen	14	1	2	0	16	1
Career Total			323	76	30	8	353	84
