= Magnus Sylling Olsen =

Norwegian footballer (born 1983)

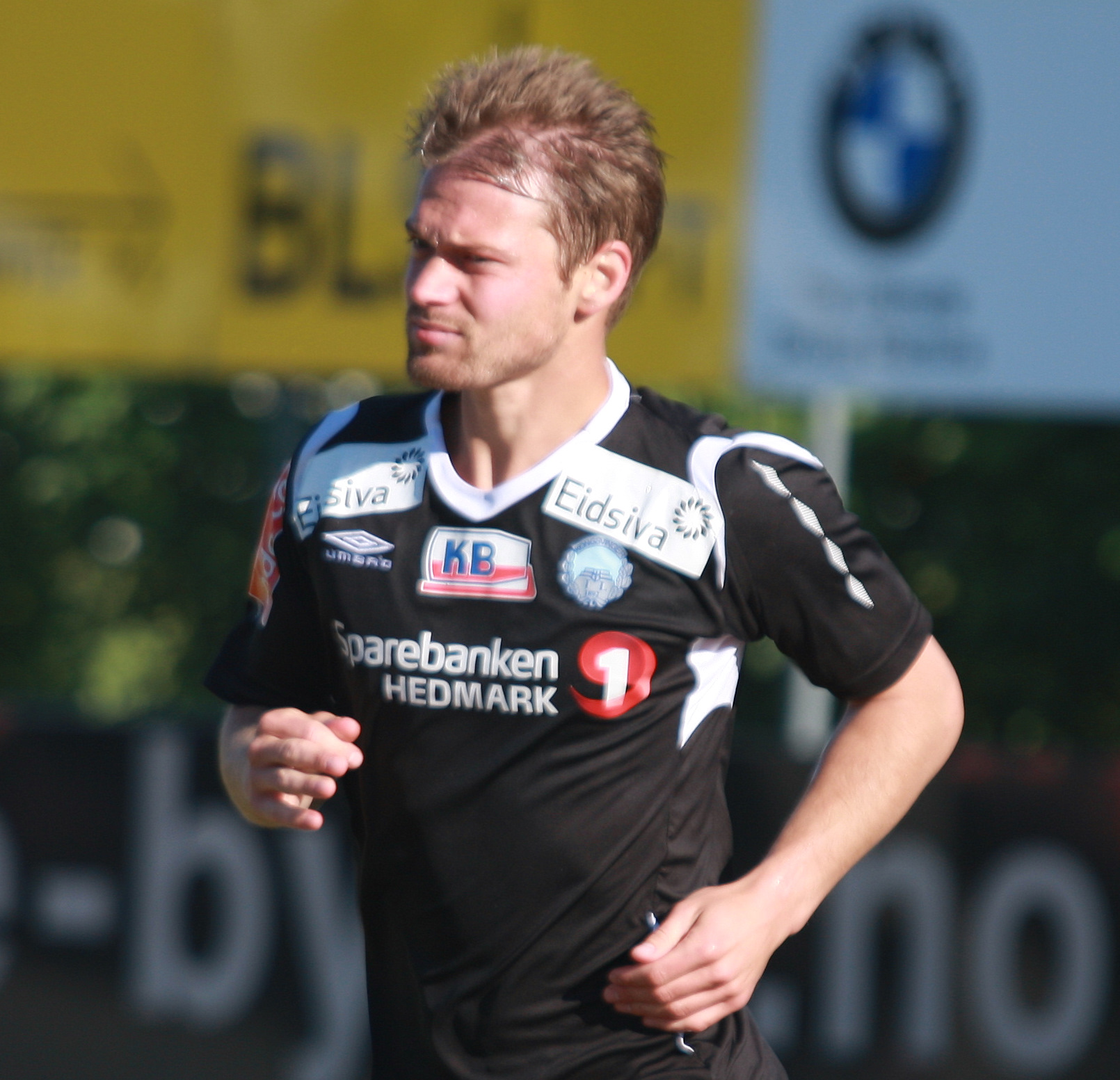
- Sylling Olsen in a match for Kongsvinger

Personal information
- Full name: Magnus Sylling Olsen
- Date of birth: 2 July 1983 (age 43)
- Place of birth: Kongsberg, Norway
- Height: 1.76 m (5 ft 9 1/2 in)
- Position: Winger

Senior career*
Years	Team	Apps	(Gls)
- Mjøndalen
2005–2006	Drøbak-Frogn		
2007–2009	Kongsvinger	81	(24)
2010–2012	Aalesund	56	(11)
2012	Bodø/Glimt	10	(5)
2013	Sarpsborg 08	19	(3)
2014–2015	HamKam	15	(2)
2014	→ Mjøndalen (loan)	11	(3)
2015–2017	Mjøndalen	72	(8)
- * Club domestic league appearances and goals

Magnus Sylling Olsen (born 2 July 1983) is a retired Norwegian footballer. He has previously played for Aalesund in Tippeligaen in addition to the lower-league clubs Mjøndalen, Drøbak-Frogn, Kongsvinger, Bodø/Glimt and Sarpsborg 08. Sylling Olsen usually played on the left wing.

== Early life ==
Sylling Olsen was born in Kongsberg and grew up in Skotselv where he played for Bakke IF until he moved to Mjøndalen at the age of 15 and started to play for Mjøndalen IF. Sylling Olsen moved to Oslo in 2004 to study at the University of Oslo and started to play for the Second Division side Drøbak-Frogn in 2005.

== Club career ==
After impressing for Drøbak-Frogn in 2006, Kongsvinger wanted to sign Sylling Olsen, and he joined the club ahead of the 2007 season, signing a one-year contract. He started the season as an offensive midfielder, but was later used on the left wing and scored a total of 10 goals in his first season in the First Division. Kongsvinger's head coach Thomas Berntsen stated that he wanted to keep Sylling Olsen at the club despite the interest from other club, and Sylling Olsen later signed for two more years.

Sylling Olsen played as a left winger for Kongsvinger for two more seasons, and was one of the biggest contributors to the club's promotion to Tippeligaen in 2009; with his 10 goals in 30 matches Sylling Olsen was Kongsvinger's top goalscorer, and he scored one of the goals in the promotion play-off match against Sogndal which Kongsvinger won 3–1. Despite being promoted to Tippeligaen, Sylling Olsen did not want to renew his contract with Kongsvinger and joined Aalesund ahead of the 2010 season. He played a total of 81 matches for Kongsvinger, scoring 24 goals.

Sylling Olsen made his debut in Tippeligaen against Lillestrøm on 14 March 2010, and scored his first goal for Aalesund in the match against Stabæk two weeks later, a goal that was named as the best goal in the third round of 2010 Tippeligaen. During the 2012 season, Sylling Olsen suffered from injuries and was informed by the club that they would not renew his contract, which expired after the season. Sylling Olsen then joined Bodø/Glimt in August 2012. He played 56 matches and scored 11 goals for Aalesund in Tippeligaen.

Sylling Olsen scored in his debut for Bodø/Glimt in the 2–1 loss against Mjøndalen on 2 September 2012. He scored five goals in ten matches for Bodø/Glimt in the First Division, and was a free agent after the 2012 season. He signed a one-year contract with the newly promoted Tippeligaen side Sarpsborg 08 in March 2013.

== Career statistics ==
As of 29 October 2017

Season	Club	Division	League		Cup		Europe		Total	
Season	Club	Division	Apps	Goals	Apps	Goals	Apps	Goals	Apps	Goals
2007	Kongsvinger	Adeccoligaen	24	10	0	0	—	—	24	10
2008	Kongsvinger	Adeccoligaen	27	4	0	0	—	—	27	4
2009	Kongsvinger	Adeccoligaen	30	10	1	0	—	—	31	10
2010	Aalesund	Tippeligaen	24	4	1	0	2	0	27	4
2011	Aalesund	Tippeligaen	20	7	6	3	7	2	33	12
2012	Aalesund	Tippeligaen	12	0	1	0	0	0	13	0
2012	Bodø/Glimt	Adeccoligaen	10	5	0	0	—	—	10	5
2013	Sarpsborg 08	Tippeligaen	19	3	1	0	—	—	20	3
2014	HamKam	1. divisjon	15	2	2	0	—	—	17	2
2014	Mjøndalen	1. divisjon	11	3	0	0	—	—	11	3
2015	Mjøndalen	Tippeligaen	22	2	3	0	–	–	25	2
2016	Mjøndalen	OBOS-ligaen	12	0	0	0	–	–	12	0
2017	Mjøndalen	OBOS-ligaen	21	1	2	0	–	–	23	1
Career Total			247	51	16	3	9	2	272	56
