= 2009 Norwegian First Division =

1. divisjon
- Season: 2009
- Dates: 5 April – 1 November
- Champions: Haugesund
- Promoted: Haugesund; Hønefoss; Kongsvinger
- Relegated: HamKam; Notodden; Stavanger; Skeid
- Matches played: 240
- Goals scored: 735 (3.06 per match)
- Top goalscorer: Thomas Sørum (24 goals)

2009 clubs

The 2009 1. divisjon (referred to as Adeccoligaen for sponsorship reasons) was a Norwegian second-tier football season. The season began play on 5 April 2009 and will end on 1 November 2009.

The club relegated from the Tippeligaen in 2008 was Ham-Kam. Sandnes Ulf and Hødd were relegated to the 2. divisjon in 2008 after finishing in fifteenth and sixteenth place respectively. Tromsdalen, Stavanger, Mjøndalen, and Skeid were promoted from the 2. divisjon in 2008.

At the end of the season, a two-legged promotion playoff will be played between the 3rd, 4th, and 5th placed teams in the 1. divisjon and the 14th placed team in the Tippeligaen.

== League table ==
Pos	Team	Pld	W	D	L	GF	GA	GD	Pts	Promotion or relegation
1	Haugesund (C, P)	30	18	4	8	67	37	+30	58	Promotion to Tippeligaen
2	Hønefoss (P)	30	16	8	6	61	32	+29	56	Promotion to Tippeligaen
3	Kongsvinger (O, P)	30	18	2	10	52	37	+15	56	Qualification for the promotion play-offs
4	Sogndal	30	14	12	4	46	29	+17	54	Qualification for the promotion play-offs
5	Sarpsborg 08 (Note: Sarpsborg 08 deducted three points for failing to correctly inform the NFF of its financial situation.)	30	15	5	10	47	38	+9	47	Qualification for the promotion play-offs
6	Alta	30	12	6	12	50	49	+1	42	
7	Moss	30	12	5	13	47	53	−6	41	
8	Bryne	30	10	10	10	41	39	+2	40	
9	Nybergsund	30	11	7	12	49	54	−5	40	
10	Løv-Ham	30	11	7	12	44	50	−6	40	
11	Mjøndalen	30	10	9	11	38	39	−1	39	
12	Tromsdalen	30	11	6	13	38	54	−16	39	
13	HamKam (R)	30	11	4	15	56	48	+8	37	Relegation to Second Division
14	Notodden (R)	30	9	2	19	38	55	−17	29	Relegation to Second Division
15	Stavanger (R)	30	6	11	13	35	53	−18	29	Relegation to Second Division
16	Skeid (R)	30	4	6	20	26	66	−40	18	Relegation to Second Division

Source: nifs.no
Rules for classification: 1) points; 2) goal difference; 3) number of goals scored.
(C) Champions; (O) Play-off winners; (P) Promoted; (R) Relegated

== Results ==
Home \ Away	ALT	BRY	HK	HAU	HØN	KIL	LØV	MIF	MFK	NOT	NIL	S08	SKD	SIL	SIF	TUIL
Alta	—	4–1	5–3	1–0	0–1	2–3	3–1	3–1	0–3	1–0	1–1	3–0	1–1	2–2	1–3	0–0
Bryne	3–1	—	0–0	0–1	1–1	1–0	3–1	1–0	3–3	1–0	4–1	0–0	2–0	1–1	1–1	2–2
HamKam	7–0	2–4	—	1–2	1–2	1–0	5–0	3–1	1–0	3–0	1–3	2–1	3–2	1–2	3–1	3–0
Haugesund	2–0	2–0	4–2	—	3–2	4–1	3–1	3–1	5–3	6–0	4–1	3–0	1–0	0–2	0–0	4–0
Hønefoss	2–0	1–1	1–1	1–1	—	3–1	3–1	0–0	6–0	3–1	1–2	3–1	6–0	0–0	3–1	2–0
Kongsvinger	4–2	1–0	3–2	4–1	0–1	—	3–1	2–0	1–0	3–0	2–0	3–0	4–0	0–2	1–0	2–0
Løv-Ham	0–0	2–1	2–2	1–1	2–0	1–1	—	0–0	1–3	2–1	3–2	4–1	2–0	3–1	3–0	0–1
Mjøndalen	0–1	2–1	3–2	4–2	2–1	2–1	0–0	—	3–1	1–0	3–3	0–0	4–0	0–0	0–0	3–0
Moss	0–5	1–1	2–0	2–1	4–0	2–3	2–1	2–0	—	1–0	2–1	2–3	2–2	0–3	1–1	2–1
Notodden	2–1	3–2	3–2	4–1	2–3	0–1	2–3	1–1	2–0	—	2–3	1–2	0–3	0–2	2–1	4–0
Nybergsund	1–2	2–0	2–2	1–0	1–5	3–0	1–2	1–0	0–2	4–2	—	2–3	4–1	1–1	2–1	1–1
Sarpsborg 08	1–1	2–3	1–0	1–0	2–1	1–0	4–1	3–1	2–0	1–2	4–1	—	0–0	2–2	4–0	4–0
Skeid	2–4	1–0	0–2	0–4	0–4	1–1	1–2	1–3	2–1	0–2	1–2	0–2	—	1–1	0–2	2–0
Sogndal	3–1	1–1	1–0	2–3	2–2	1–2	2–1	0–0	2–1	2–1	1–0	0–1	2–1	—	1–1	3–0
Stavanger	0–4	0–2	2–1	0–4	2–2	3–5	2–2	3–1	2–2	1–1	2–2	0–2	2–1	0–0	—	4–2
Tromsdalen	2–1	3–2	1–0	2–2	0–1	3–0	3–1	4–2	2–1	1–0	1–1	1–0	3–3	3–4	2–0	—

Source: NIFS (in Norwegian)
Legend: Blue = home team win; Yellow = draw; Red = away team win.

== Promotion play-offs ==
The two winning sides from the first round, Sarpsborg 08 and Kongsvinger, took part in a two-legged play-off to decide who would play in the 2010 Tippeligaen.

First leg

9 November 2009
19:35 CET (UTC+1)

Sarpsborg 08	3–2	Kongsvinger
Hoås 8'; Wiig 71'; Jørgensen 81'	Report	Nilsson (red card) 69'; Johannesen 80'; Frejd 90'

Sarpsborg Stadion, Sarpsborg
Attendance: 2,350
Referee: Svein Oddvar Moen

Second leg

12 November 2009
19:35 CET (UTC+1)

Kongsvinger	3–1	Sarpsborg 08
Frejd 5'; Johannesen 26', 31'	Report	Hoås 38'

Gjemselund Stadion, Kongsvinger
Attendance: 2,700
Referee: Terje Hauge

Kongsvinger won 5–4 on aggregate and were promoted to the 2010 Tippeligaen.

== Top goalscorers ==
Rank	Scorer	Club	Goals
1	(Norway) Thomas Sørum	Haugesund	24
2	(Norway) Lars Lafton	Hønefoss	21
3	(Norway) Vegard Braaten	Alta	18
4	(Norway) Martin Wiig	Sarpsborg 08	15
5	(Norway) Marius Helle	Bryne	14
5	(Norway) Kenneth Kvalheim	Moss	14
5	(Nigeria) Kim Ojo	Nybergsund	14
8	(Norway) Tore Andreas Gundersen	Nybergsund	13
9	(Norway) Erik Midtgarden	Mjøndalen	10
9	(Norway) Magnus Sylling Olsen	Kongsvinger	10
9	(Norway) Kamal Saaliti	Hønefoss	10
9	(Serbia) Nikola Đurđić	Haugesund	10
9	(Norway) Øyvind Hoås	Sarpsborg 08	10

Last updated: 1 November 2009
Source: NRK Sport (in Norwegian)
