= Ousseynou Boye =

Senegalese footballer

Personal information
- Date of birth: 7 September 1992 (age 34)
- Place of birth: Senegal
- Height: 1.71 m (5 ft 7 in)
- Position: Forward

Team information
- Current team: Olympique Khouribga
- Number: 19

Senior career*
Years	Team	Apps	(Gls)
–2015	Diambars		
2015–2018	Mjøndalen	67	(20)
2019	El Gouna	7	(0)
2020–	Olympique Khouribga	8	(1)
- * Club domestic league appearances and goals as of 19:39, 10 September 2020 (UTC)

Ousseynou Boye (born 7 September 1992) is a Senegalese footballer who plays as a forward for Olympique Khouribga.

== Career ==
He moved from native Diambars to Norwegian club Mjøndalen in the summer of 2015, and played three matches in the 2015 Eliteserien, then several matches in the 1. divisjon after relegation.
