= Alagie Sosseh =

Gambian footballer

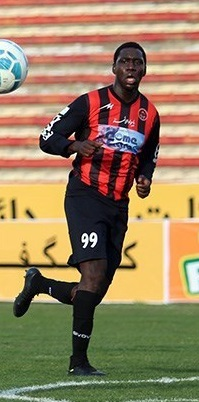

Personal information
- Full name: Alagie Dodou Matar Sosseh
- Date of birth: 21 July 1986 (age 40)
- Place of birth: Stockholm, Sweden
- Height: 1.88 m (6 ft 2 in)
- Position: Forward

Team information
- Current team: Assyriska FF
- Number: 27

Youth career
- Enskede IK
- 2005: Spårvägens FF

Senior career*
| Years | Team | Apps | (Gls) |
| 2006–2008 | Hammarby TFF | | |
| 2007–2009 | Hammarby IF | 9 | (0) |
| 2009–2010 | Landskrona BoIS | 38 | (2) |
| 2010 | Väsby United | 12 | (2) |
| 2011–2013 | IK Sirius | 35 | (13) |
| 2013 | AFC United | 6 | (0) |
| 2013 | Birkebeineren | 6 | (5) |
| 2013 | Fredrikstad | 0 | (0) |
| 2013 | Ånge IF | 5 | (5) |
| 2014–2015 | Mjøndalen | 35 | (4) |
| 2015 | Nest-Sotra | 10 | (2) |
| 2016 | Siah Jamegan | 9 | (1) |
| 2016 | IK Frej | 11 | (2) |
| 2017 | Akropolis IF | 23 | (15) |
| 2018 | Assyriska FF | 15 | (11) |
| 2018–2019 | Syrianska FC | 9 | (4) |
| 2020 | Akropolis IF | 10 | (2) |
| 2019–2020 | Fatih Karagümrük | 4 | (0) |
| 2020 | Sông Lam Nghệ An | 8 | (0) |
| 2020 | United IK | 3 | (0) |
| 2021 | IFK Haninge | 6 | (0) |
| 2021– | Assyriska FF | | |

International career
| 2010– | Gambia | 5 | (0) |
- * Club domestic league appearances and goals as of 1 January 2022

Alagie Sosseh (born 21 July 1986) is a Gambian football player who plays for Assyriska FF.

== Career ==
Sosseh has played for Hammarby IF and Landskrona BoIS. In December 2015, Sosseh transferred to Siah Jamegan of the Persian Gulf Pro League.

== International career ==
As of 31 March 2011, he has played seven internationals for the Gambian national football team.

== Personal life ==
Sosseh is the brother of the professional footballer Sal Jobarteh.
