= 2017 Norwegian Second Division =

2. divisjon
- Season: 2017
- Champions: HamKam; Nest-Sotra
- Promoted: HamKam; Nest-Sotra; Notodden
- Relegated: Finnsnes; Brumunddal; Follo; Vindbjart; Fana; Byåsen
- Matches: 364
- Goals: 1,150 (3.16 per match)
- Top goalscorer: Alexander Dang (21 goals)

The 2017 2. divisjon (referred to as PostNord-ligaen for sponsorship reasons) was a Norwegian football third-tier league. The league consisted of 28 teams divided into 2 groups of 14 teams.

The league was played as a double round-robin tournament, where all teams played 26 matches. The first round was played on 17 April 2017, while the last round was played on 21 October 2017.

== League tables ==
=== Group 1 ===
Pos	Team	Pld	W	D	L	GF	GA	GD	Pts	Promotion, qualification or relegation
1	HamKam (P)	26	21	2	3	56	18	+38	65	Promotion to First Division
2	Raufoss	26	14	5	7	53	28	+25	47	Qualification for the promotion play-offs
3	Asker	26	13	8	5	50	36	+14	47	
4	Alta	26	13	7	6	42	24	+18	46	
5	Skeid	26	13	5	8	42	27	+15	44	
6	Grorud	26	11	4	11	43	49	−6	37	
7	KFUM-Oslo	26	10	4	12	43	39	+4	34	
8	Kjelsås	26	9	7	10	34	40	−6	34	
9	Bærum	26	8	9	9	46	44	+2	33	
10	Nybergsund-Trysil	26	9	4	13	40	46	−6	31	
11	Vålerenga 2	26	8	3	15	28	52	−24	27	
12	Finnsnes (R)	26	6	4	16	26	45	−19	22	Relegation to Third Division
13	Brumunddal (R)	26	6	4	16	21	46	−25	22	Relegation to Third Division
14	Follo (R)	26	6	4	16	28	58	−30	22	Relegation to Third Division

Source: nifs.no
Rules for classification: 1) points; 2) goal difference; 3) number of goals scored.
(P) Promoted; (R) Relegated

=== Group 2 ===
Pos	Team	Pld	W	D	L	GF	GA	GD	Pts	Promotion, qualification or relegation
1	Nest-Sotra (P)	26	15	9	2	60	22	+38	54	Promotion to First Division
2	Notodden (O, P)	26	17	3	6	53	26	+27	54	Qualification for the promotion play-offs
3	Bryne	26	13	8	5	52	37	+15	47	
4	Vidar	26	13	3	10	56	49	+7	42	
5	Fram Larvik	26	12	6	8	49	43	+6	42	
6	Hødd	26	11	7	8	44	37	+7	40	
7	Nardo	26	12	4	10	29	35	−6	40	
8	Vard Haugesund	26	12	3	11	33	36	−3	39	
9	Egersund	26	8	10	8	40	29	+11	34	
10	Hønefoss	26	9	5	12	35	41	−6	32	
11	Odd 2	26	7	5	14	51	69	−18	26	
12	Vindbjart (R)	26	6	4	16	44	58	−14	22	Relegation to Third Division
13	Fana (R)	26	5	7	14	30	64	−34	22	Relegation to Third Division
14	Byåsen (R)	26	3	4	19	22	52	−30	13	Relegation to Third Division

Source: nifs.no
Rules for classification: 1) points; 2) goal difference; 3) number of goals scored.
(O) Play-off winners; (P) Promoted; (R) Relegated

== Promotion play-offs ==
The teams who finished in second place in their respective group qualified for the promotion play-offs, where they faced each other over two legs. The winner will play against the 14th placed team in 1. divisjon for a place in the 2018 1. divisjon.

28 October 2017
16:00 CEST

Raufoss	2–1	Notodden
Nilsen 25'; Hjelmtvedt 53'	Summary	Mbedule 88'

Nammo Stadion, Raufoss
Attendance: 1,070
Referee: Mads Følstad Skarsem
4 November 2017
16:00 CET

Notodden	2–1 (a.e.t.)	Raufoss
Midtgarden 42' (pen.); Johansen 53'	Summary	Senstad 90'
Penalties
Midtgarden (penalty scored); Bakke (penalty scored); Tähti (penalty scored); Johansen (penalty scored); Hustad (penalty scored)	5–4	(penalty scored) Senstad; (penalty scored) Henningsson; (penalty scored) Alm; (penalty missed) Lauvli; (penalty scored) Onsrud

Idrettsparken, Notodden
Attendance: 1,277
Referee: Jan Morten Tennøy

3–3 on aggregate. Notodden won 5–4 on penalties.

== Top scorers ==
=== Group 1 ===
Rank	Player	Club	Goals
1	(Norway) David Tavakoli	Skeid	20
2	(Sweden) Anton Henningsson	Raufoss	19
3	(Norway) Ivar Sollie Rønning	HamKam	18
4	(Norway) Vegard Braaten	Alta	15
5	(Ivory Coast) Kevin Beugré	HamKam	10
5	(Norway) Emil Mikael Ekblom	KFUM Oslo	10
5	(Norway) Erblin Llullaku	Bærum	10
5	(Norway) Marcus Mehnert	Asker	10
9	(Norway) Markus Naglestad	HamKam	9
9	(Sweden) Demba Traoré	Asker	9
9	(Norway) Eivind Holte Tøråsen	Nybergsund	9

=== Group 2 ===
Rank	Player	Club	Goals
1	(Norway) Alexander Dang	Nest-Sotra	21
2	(Norway) Øyvind Løkkebø Gausdal	Vindbjart	20
3	(Norway) Omar Fonstad el Ghaouti	Fram Larvik	19
3	(The Gambia) Bubacarr Sumareh	Egersund	19
5	(Norway) Sigurd Hauso Haugen	Odd 2	16
5	(Norway) Martin Hummervoll	Vidar	16
7	(Norway) Simen August Næss	Bryne	13
8	(Norway) Kristoffer Hoven	Hønefoss	12
8	(Norway) Torbjørn Kallevåg	Hødd	12
10	(Norway) Aram Khalili	Bryne	11
10	(Norway) Erik Midtgarden	Notodden	11
