= 2013 Norwegian First Division =

1. divisjon
- Season: 2013
- Dates: 6 April – 3 November
- Champions: Bodø/Glimt
- Promoted: Bodø/Glimt; Stabæk
- Relegated: Vard Haugesund; Kongsvinger; Follo; Elverum
- Matches played: 240
- Goals scored: 720 (3 per match)
- Top goalscorer: Jo Sondre Aas (18 goals)
- Biggest home win: Bodø/Glimt 8–0 Kongsvinger
- Biggest away win: Elverum 0–5 Follo
- Highest scoring: Fredrikstad 4–4 Vard Haugesund; Bodø/Glimt 8–0 Kongsvinger; Bryne 3–5 Vard Haugesund
- Longest winning run: 12 games Bodø/Glimt
- Longest unbeaten run: 17 games Bodø/Glimt
- Longest winless run: 11 games Elverum
- Longest losing run: 6 games Follo
- Highest attendance: 5,617; Sandefjord 2–2 Elverum (9 August 2013)
- Lowest attendance: 153; Vard Haugesund 2–0 Ranheim (1 September 2013)

The 2013 1. divisjon (referred to as Adeccoligaen for sponsorship reasons) was a Norwegian second-tier football league season. The season began on 6 April 2013 and was concluded on 3 November 2013. The league was contested by 16 teams. The top two teams were promoted to the Tippeligaen, while the teams placed from third to sixth place played a promotion-playoff against the 14th-placed team in Tippeligaen to win promotion. The bottom four teams were relegated to the 2. divisjon.

== Background ==
From the 2012 1. divisjon, Start and Sarpsborg 08 won promotion to Tippeligaen, while Stabæk and Fredrikstad were relegated to the First Division.

Tromsdalen, Bærum, Notodden and Alta were relegated from the 2012 1. divisjon, while Elverum, Kristiansund, Vard Haugesund and Follo were promoted from the 2012 2. divisjon.

== Summary ==
At the end of the season Bodø/Glimt and Stabæk won promotion to the 2014 Tippeligaen, while Vard Haugesund, Kongsvinger Elverum and Follo was relegated to the 2. divisjon.

== Teams ==
Locations of the teams in the 2013 1. divisjon

Team	Location	Arena	Capacity	Manager
Bodø/Glimt	Bodø	Aspmyra Stadion	7,354	Jan Halvor Halvorsen
Bryne	Bryne	Bryne Stadion	10,000	Gaute Larsen
Elverum	Elverum	Sentralidrettsplassen	2,000	Kevin Knappen
Follo	Ski	Ski Stadion	2,500	Hans Erik Eriksen
Fredrikstad	Fredrikstad	Fredrikstad Stadion	12,560	Lars Bakkerud
HamKam	Hamar	Briskeby gressbane	10,200	Vegard Skogheim
Hødd	Ulsteinvik	Høddvoll Stadion	3,120	Lars Arne Nilsen
Kristiansund	Kristiansund	Atlanten stadion	4,000	Geir Bakke
Kongsvinger	Kongsvinger	Gjemselund Stadion	5,202	Stian Aasen
Mjøndalen	Mjøndalen	Mjøndalen Stadion	2,100	Vegard Hansen
Ranheim	Trondheim	DNB Arena	2,000	Trond Nordsteien
Sandefjord	Sandefjord	Komplett.no Arena	9,000	Arne Sandstø
Stabæk	Bærum	Nadderud Stadion	7,000	Petter Belsvik
Strømmen	Strømmen	Strømmen Stadion	1,800	Erland Johnsen
Ull/Kisa	Jessheim	UKI Arena	3,000	Roar Johansen
Vard Haugesund	Haugesund	Haugesund Stadion	8,800	Flemming Christensen

== League table ==
Pos	Team	Pld	W	D	L	GF	GA	GD	Pts	Promotion or relegation
1	Bodø/Glimt (C, P)	30	21	4	5	63	24	+39	67	Promotion to Tippeligaen
2	Stabæk (P)	30	14	10	6	51	46	+5	52	Promotion to Tippeligaen
3	Hødd	30	15	5	10	41	31	+10	50	Qualification for the promotion play-offs
4	Ranheim	30	14	7	9	49	38	+11	49	Qualification for the promotion play-offs
5	HamKam	30	14	6	10	49	43	+6	48	Qualification for the promotion play-offs
6	Mjøndalen	30	14	5	11	37	40	−3	47	Qualification for the promotion play-offs
7	Bryne	30	13	7	10	55	50	+5	46	
8	Sandefjord	30	12	7	11	39	39	0	43	
9	Kristiansund BK	30	12	6	12	47	44	+3	42	
10	Fredrikstad	30	11	8	11	44	41	+3	41	
11	Strømmen	30	9	11	10	39	43	−4	38	
12	Ullensaker/Kisa	30	9	7	14	46	48	−2	34	
13	Vard Haugesund (R)	30	9	7	14	46	55	−9	34	Relegation to Second Division
14	Kongsvinger (R)	30	7	10	13	37	54	−17	31	Relegation to Second Division
15	Follo (Note: Follo were docked 2 points for lack of financial control) (R)	30	9	2	19	40	57	−17	27	Relegation to Second Division
16	Elverum (R)	30	3	6	21	37	67	−30	15	Relegation to Second Division

Source: nifs.no
Rules for classification: 1) points; 2) goal difference; 3) number of goals scored.
(C) Champions; (P) Promoted; (R) Relegated

== Results ==
Home \ Away	BOD	BRY	ELV	FOL	FFK	HK	ILH	KIL	KBK	MIF	RF	SF	STB	SIF	ULL	VAR
Bodø/Glimt	—	5–3	3–0	3–0	4–0	2–0	1–0	8–0	2–0	2–0	0–2	2–0	2–1	3–0	3–1	1–0
Bryne	4–0	—	3–1	4–3	2–1	1–0	3–1	0–1	4–2	0–1	3–1	1–2	1–2	2–1	2–2	3–5
Elverum	1–2	1–2	—	0–5	0–1	2–2	0–2	2–2	2–3	0–2	1–4	0–1	3–4	1–1	5–1	0–2
Follo	0–1	0–0	3–1	—	0–1	2–1	2–2	2–1	0–1	0–1	0–2	2–1	2–3	3–0	3–4	4–0
Fredrikstad	2–0	4–0	2–1	0–1	—	3–0	3–2	1–1	1–4	3–0	1–1	1–2	4–0	2–2	2–2	4–4
HamKam	0–0	3–2	1–0	3–1	2–1	—	1–0	1–1	2–1	1–2	1–4	3–0	2–2	2–0	2–1	1–1
Hødd	2–1	0–1	4–1	2–0	0–1	2–1	—	1–0	1–1	1–0	2–3	2–0	1–0	2–1	2–0	0–2
Kongsvinger	1–4	1–1	2–1	4–0	2–1	3–0	0–1	—	5–1	1–0	2–3	0–3	2–2	0–0	0–2	1–1
Kristiansund	0–2	2–2	3–1	4–2	2–2	5–1	0–1	1–0	—	0–2	1–0	1–0	1–2	1–1	0–2	1–2
Mjøndalen	0–3	0–3	3–2	4–1	0–0	0–2	3–1	3–0	2–1	—	0–0	2–1	1–1	2–2	2–1	2–1
Ranheim	0–2	0–0	2–2	4–0	3–0	0–3	1–1	5–1	1–1	0–1	—	1–3	1–1	1–0	2–0	2–1
Sandefjord	2–1	2–0	2–2	2–1	0–0	3–2	0–2	2–2	1–2	4–2	0–1	—	0–0	1–1	1–1	3–1
Stabæk	1–1	2–2	3–3	2–1	2–1	1–5	2–1	3–1	0–0	2–0	4–1	4–1	—	2–1	1–0	1–1
Strømmen	1–1	2–0	2–0	1–0	2–1	2–2	0–2	2–0	0–3	1–1	4–1	0–0	2–3	—	3–2	3–2
Ull/Kisa	1–2	3–3	0–1	4–0	2–0	1–2	1–1	1–1	1–4	4–0	1–3	0–1	2–0	1–1	—	2–0
Vard Haugesund	2–2	2–3	0–3	1–2	0–1	0–3	2–2	2–2	2–1	2–1	2–0	2–1	3–0	2–3	1–3	—

Source: NIFS (in Norwegian)
Legend: Blue = home team win; Yellow = draw; Red = away team win.

== Top scorers ==
Rank	Player	Club	Goals	Games	Average
1	(Norway) Jo Sondre Aas	Ranheim	18	29	0.62
2	(Norway) Ibba Laajab	Bodø/Glimt	17	26	0.65
2	(Norway) Aram Khalili	Bryne	17	29	0.59
2	(Norway) Mads Stokkelien	Stabæk	17	30	0.57
5	(Norway) Oddbjørn Skartun	Bryne	16	30	0.53
6	(Norway) Pål Alexander Kirkevold	Mjøndalen	14	25	0.56
6	(Norway) Ole Kristian Langås	Ullensaker/Kisa	14	30	0.47
8	(Denmark) Sanel Kapidzic	Vard Haugesund	13	27	0.48
9	(Norway) Kent Håvard Eriksen	Elverum	12	26	0.46
9	(Cape Verde) Steevan Dos Santos	Ullensaker/Kisa	12	27	0.44
9	(Senegal) Papa Alioune Ndiaye	Bodø/Glimt	12	27	0.44
9	(Norway) Robert Stene	Fredrikstad	12	29	0.41
13	(Norway) Jean Alassane Mendy	Kristiansund	11	24	0.46
14	(Norway) Fitim Azemi	Follo	10	29	0.34
14	(Norway) Alexander Ruud Tveter	Follo	10	30	0.33
16	(Norway) Jim Johansen	Bodø/Glimt	9	27	0.33
16	(Norway) Martin Brekke	Elverum	9	28	0.32
16	(Norway) Magnus Myklebust	Kongsvinger	9	29	0.31
16	(Norway) Emil Dahle	HamKam	9	29	0.31
