= Arne Sandstø =

Norwegian footballer (born 1966)

Personal information
- Date of birth: 21 October 1966 (age 60)
- Place of birth: Bergen, Norway
- Position: Striker

Youth career
- –1983: Norna-Salhus

Senior career*
Years	Team	Apps	(Gls)
1984	Norna-Salhus		
1985	Brann	6	(0)
1986	Norna-Salhus		
1987	Varegg		
1988	Bergen Nord		
1989	Hertha BSC II		
1989–1994	Tennis Borussia Berlin		
1994–1996	Lillestrøm	62	(19)
1997–1999	Odd	67	(13)

Managerial career
- 1999–2007: Odd
- 2008: Start
- 2009: Notodden
- 2009–2011: Løv-Ham
- 2011–2013: Sandefjord
- 2016–2023: Jerv
- 2023–2024: Midtjylland (first team coach)
- 2025: Värnamo
- 2026–: Jerv
- * Club domestic league appearances and goals

Arne Sandstø (born 21 October 1966) is a Norwegian football manager and former player who most recently was the head coach at Värnamo. Starting his career as a striker, he failed to break through at his hometown's largest club SK Brann, but reached professional football in West Germany's Tennis Borussia Berlin via a number of smaller clubs. Returning to Norway, he played on the highest tier for Lillestrøm and Odd, starting his managerial career in the latter club. He notably worked eight years in Odd followed by seven years in FK Jerv.

== Playing career ==
He hails from Mjølkeråen in Åsane. He played for IL Norna-Salhus and was picked up by first-tier team SK Brann ahead of the 1985 season. Among others, he scored in a preseason match against Fyllingen, and started against Moss in the league.

In 1986, he was back at Norna-Salhus. By the summer of 1986, he was the top goalscorer of the local Fourth Division groups. Though he was eventually overtaken in the top goalscorer table, Sandstø kept the likes of Mons Ivar Mjelde behind him. Sandstø was placed on the watchlist of Varegg and Åsane, as well as first-tier team Bryne FK.

After spending the 1987 season in Varegg, Sandstø returned to Norna-Salhus, who had demerged its football team to form an independent club Bergen Nord FK. He travelled to West Berlin in late 1988 to go on trial with Hertha BSC. He was first assigned to Hertha BSC II, becoming cleared for his debut in March 1989. Sandstø was hoping to make his way into the first team in "two–three months".

He was deemed surplus at Hertha, and changed to Tennis Borussia Berlin in the Amateur-Oberliga Berlin in 1989. He spent parts of his first year on the sidelines due to injury, but was a reliable goalscorer.

During the 1990–91 winter break and 1991 summer break, Sandstø garnered interest in Fana, Fyllingen, and Brann. In 1991–92, interest became stronger from Brann, Lillestrøm, Lyn and Vålerengen. He rejected all offers, as his most lucrative option turned out to be a new contract with TeBe Berlin. It was described as a "Norwegian executive's wage".

Eventually, TeBe Berlin reached the 2. Bundesliga from the 1992–93 NOFV-Oberliga, as the playoff winners, Union Berlin, was unable to meet the 2. Bundesliga requirements. At the time, Sandstø was said to be TeBe Berlin's longest-serving player. Sandstø made seven appearances in Germany's 1993–94 2. Bundesliga.

In January 1994, Sandstø trained with SK Brann, but was eventually not signed by the Bergen club. Instead, he signed for Lillestrøm SK, joining them on a free transfer in July 1994.

== Managerial career ==
Under Sandstø's leadership Odd Grenland performed consistently in the top flight until the club was relegated in 2007. Sandstø also led Odd to their first Norwegian cup victory in 69 years, in 2000.

Since 2008, Sandstø has been the head coach of clubs at the second level of Norwegian football. In 2008, he led IK Start to promotion. In 2010, he led Løv-Ham, who were struggling financially, to a surprising spot in the play-offs. In both 2011 and 2012, he led Sandefjord Fotball to third place and narrowly missed promotion. In 2016, he led FK Jerv to a third place and a spot in the play-offs, which is the club's best league performance in history.

In July 2023, Sandstø joined Danish club FC Midtjylland in a role as "first team coach". He was sacked in December 2024, as the club "strives for more" to "reach the next level". The next year he was picked up by Swedish club IFK Värnamo, who needed a new manager following a weak start to the 2025 Allsvenskan. After 14 games of the Allsvenskan season, Värnamo had still not won a single one.
