= Idrettsparken (Notodden) =

Football stadium in Norway

- Interactive map of Idrettsparken
- Former names: Tinfos Arena (2008)
- Location: O H Holtas Gate 29; 3678 Notodden; Norway
- Coordinates: 59°33′52″N 9°15′36″E
- Capacity: 2,723
- Surface: Artificial
- Record attendance: 2,723 (Notodden vs Odd Grenland, 13 September 2008)

Construction
- Groundbreaking: 2007
- Built: 2007–2008
- Opened: 13 April 2008

Tenant
- Notodden FK (2008–present)

Idrettsparken (also known as Tinfos Arena until 13 September 2008 for sponsorship reasons) is a football stadium located in Notodden, Norway. The stadium is the home ground of Norwegian second tier club Notodden FK and has a current capacity of 2,723.

The record attendance of 2,723 was set on 13 September 2008 in a 1. divisjon game against Odd Grenland.
