= Mjøndalen IF Fotball =

Association football club

- Full name: Mjøndalen Idrettsforening Fotball
- Founded: 22 August 1910; 116 years ago
- Ground: Consto Arena
- Capacity: 4,350
- Head coach: Kevin Nicol
- League: 2. divisjon
- 2025: 1. divisjon, 15th of 16 (relegated)
- Website: www.mif.no
Home colours	Away colours

Mjøndalen IF Fotball – commonly known as Mjøndalen IF, and colloquially as Mjøndar'n or MIF – is the football department of Mjøndalen IF. Founded in 1910, the club is located in Mjøndalen, Buskerud, Norway. The team plays its home matches in the 4,350-capacity Consto Arena. Mjøndalen competes in 2. divisjon, the third tier in the Norwegian football league system, having been relegated from the Norwegian First Division at the end of the 2025 season.

== History ==
=== First era ===
The club was founded in 1910. Mjøndalen reached the final of the 1924 Norwegian Cup where they lost 3–0 against Odd. In the 1930s, Mjøndalen won the Norwegian Cup three times; 1933, 1934 and 1937. In the same decade, they also lost in the finals thrice; in 1931, 1936 and 1938.

=== Second era and European debut ===
As runners-up in the 1968 Norwegian Cup, Mjøndalen men's football team represented Norway in the European Cup Winners' Cup in the following 1969–70 season. They were eliminated in the first round by Cardiff City who defeated Mjøndalen 12–2 on aggregate. After being promoted to the top division in 1971, Mjøndalen regularly played on the top-tier of Norwegian football in the 1970s and 1980s, and finished second in 1976 and 1986. Finishing runners-up in the league qualified them to represent Norway in the UEFA Cup the following season.

=== Middle years ===
The last round of the 1976 season saw Mjøndalen beat SK Brann, a result which would have awarded them the league title if Lillestrøm SK had lost their game — which they did not. However, Mjøndalen's silver medals saw the team qualify for the 1977–78 UEFA Cup, where they lost the first round against Bayern Munich 0–12 on aggregate. After Mjøndalen's second silver medals in the 1986 league season, they were relegated the following season and were not promoted back to the top level until 1992. A highlight from the years in lower divisions was their meeting with German side Werder Bremen in the first round of the 1987–88 UEFA Cup. Mjøndalen lost 1–5 on aggregate, but their 1–0 win away at Bremen, remain their only victory in UEFA competitions. After their 1992 top-flight comeback season, Mjøndalen was relegated, had financial challenges, and participated in the second, third and fourth tier of Norwegian football for a number of seasons.

=== Recent years ===
Mjøndalen had a successful 2008 in 2. divisjon, and returned to 1. divisjon for the 2009 season. The club qualified to compete in the promotion knock out stage of 1. divisjon in both 2012 and 2013, and finally earned promotion to the Tippeligaen with a successful 2014 play-off result against Brann. Mjøndalen's return to Tippeligaen for 2015 marked their first appearance in the top tier in 22 years. The team finished in 15th place — second from bottom — and was relegated to the 2016 1. divisjon. In 2018, Mjøndalen finished in second place in the 2018 1. divisjon and was promoted to Eliteserien. In the following season, Mjøndalen succeeded in retaining their spot in the top flight through winning on the last day of the season.

== Honours ==
=== League ===
First tier

- 1. divisjon (Note: 1. divisjon was the name of the top tier of Norwegian league football from 1963 until 1990. The top tier changed its name to the sponsor-affiliated name Tippeligaen ahead of the 1990 season. The second tier formerly known as 2. divisjon inherited the name 1. divisjon ahead of the 1991 season. The third tier, formerly known as 3. divisjon was named 2. divisjon ahead of the 1991 season and the names of all the lower divisions were adjusted accordingly. Effecting 2017, the top tier is named Eliteserien.)
  - Runners-up (2): 1976, 1986

Second tier

- 2. divisjon group A
  - Winners (4): 1971, 1978, 1981, 1984
- 1. divisjon
  - Winners (1): 1991

=== Cup ===
- Norwegian Cup:
  - Winners (3): 1933, 1934, 1937
  - Runners-up (5): 1924, 1931, 1936, 1938, 1968

== Recent seasons ==
Season	Tier (group)	Pos.	Pl.	W	D	L	GS	GA	Pts.	Cup	Notes
2001	3. divisjon (gr. 9)	4	22	14	1	7	60	34	43	dnq	
2002	3. divisjon (gr. 8)	1	22	16	3	3	69	25	51	dnq	Lost play-offs for promotion
2003	3. divisjon (gr. 8)	5	22	12	1	9	70	37	37	First qualifying round	
2004	3. divisjon (gr. 8)	1	22	17	3	2	67	22	54	First round	Lost play-offs for promotion
2005	3. divisjon (gr. 8)	2	22	20	1	1	102	19	61	First round	
2006	3. divisjon (gr. 7)	↑ 1	20	18	1	1	102	22	55	First round	Promoted to 2. divisjon
2007	2. divisjon (gr. 4)	2	26	14	7	5	62	34	49	Second round	
2008	2. divisjon (gr. 1)	↑ 1	26	17	4	5	64	34	55	First round	Promoted to 1. divisjon
2009	1. divisjon	11	30	10	9	11	38	39	39	Fourth round	
2010	1. divisjon	10	28	10	5	13	41	49	35	Third round	
2011	1. divisjon	10	30	10	10	10	42	51	40	Third round	
2012	1. divisjon	4	30	16	7	7	52	43	55	Fourth round	Lost playoffs for promotion
2013	1. divisjon	6	30	14	5	11	37	40	47	Quarter-final	Lost play-offs for promotion
2014	1. divisjon	↑ 3	30	14	9	7	57	36	51	Fourth round	Promoted to Tippeligaen
2015	Tippeligaen	↓ 15	30	4	9	17	38	69	21	Quarter-final	Relegated to 1. divisjon
2016	1. divisjon	6	30	13	10	7	49	38	48	Second round	Lost play-offs for promotion
2017	1. divisjon	3	30	15	7	8	56	37	52	Quarter-final	
2018	1. divisjon	↑ 2	30	17	9	4	49	24	60	Fourth round	Promoted to Eliteserien
2019	Eliteserien	13	30	6	12	12	38	52	30	Quarter-final	
2020	Eliteserien	14	30	8	3	19	26	45	27	Cancelled	
2021	Eliteserien	↓ 16	30	4	10	16	33	52	22	Third round	Relegated to 1. divisjon
2022	1. divisjon	9	30	13	3	14	39	47	42	Second round	
2023	1. divisjon	13	30	10	7	13	39	42	37	Third round	
2024	1. divisjon	14	30	8	8	14	38	50	31	Second round	
2025	1. divisjon	↓ 15	30	6	7	17	36	71	25	Third round	Relegated to 2. divisjon

== European record ==
Season	Competition	Round	Club	Home	Away	Agg.
1969–70	Cup Winners' Cup	1st Round	(Wales) Cardiff City	1–7	1–5	2–12
1977–78	UEFA Cup	1st Round	(Germany) Bayern Munich	0–8	0–4	0–12
1987–88	UEFA Cup	1st Round	(Germany) Werder Bremen	0–5	1–0	1–5

== Current squad ==
As of 2 September 2026

Note: Flags indicate national team as defined under FIFA eligibility rules; some limited exceptions apply. Players may hold more than one non-FIFA nationality.

No.	Pos.	Nation	Player
1	GK	NOR	Peder Klausen
2	DF	NOR	Isak Vik (on loan from Tromsø)
3	DF	NOR	Erik Kristiansen
5	DF	NOR	Benjamin Sundo
6	MF	NOR	Tobias Bjørnebye
7	FW	NOR	Oliver Midtgård
8	MF	NOR	Sander Marthinussen
9	FW	NOR	Mathias Bringaker
11	MF	NOR	Jonas Bruusgaard
14	MF	NOR	Tobias Flem
15	MF	NOR	Kristoffer Steinset
17	DF	NOR	Jesper Solberg

No.	Pos.	Nation	Player
18	MF	NOR	Nickolay Årsbog
19	DF	NOR	Oliver Rotihaug
20	MF	NOR	Emin Pajić (on loan from Kongsvinger)
21	DF	NOR	Christian Breivik
25	GK	NOR	Jonathan Reiersen
27	DF	GHA	Kweku Kekeli
28	DF	NOR	Lucas Nicol
29	FW	NOR	Giba Sesay (on loan from Strømsgodset II)
34	MF	NOR	Linus Ween
77	FW	DEN	Valdemar Schmølker
92	FW	NOR	Markus Ottesen

For season transfers, see transfers winter 2024–25 and transfers summer 2025.

=== Out on loan ===
Note: Flags indicate national team as defined under FIFA eligibility rules; some limited exceptions apply. Players may hold more than one non-FIFA nationality.

No. / Pos. / Nation / Player; 10 / FW / NOR / Keerat Singh (at Eidsvold TF until 31 December 2026)	No. / Pos. / Nation / Player; 13 / GK / NOR / Philip Bro (at Fana IL until 31 December 2026)

== History of league positions (since 1963) ==
	1900s															2000s							
	'63– '66	'67– '71	'72– '77	'78	'79	'80– '81	'82– '83	'84	'85– '87	'88– '91	'92	'93– '94	'95	'96	'97– '98	1999– 2006	'07– '08	'09– '14	'15	'16– '18	'19– '21	'22– '25	'26–
Level 1																							
Level 2																							
Level 3																							
Level 4																							
