= Consto Arena =

Football stadium in Nedre Eiker, Norway

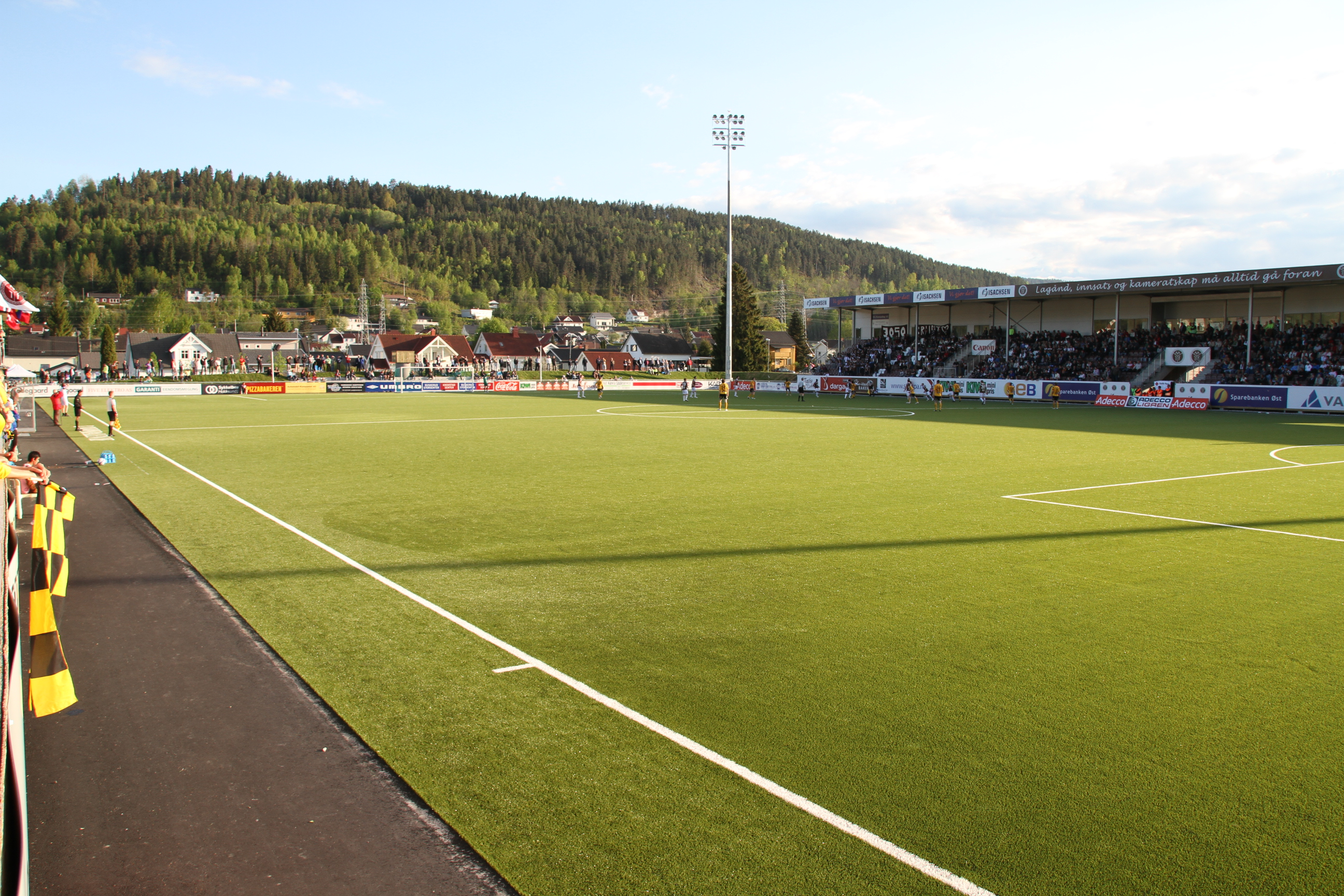
- Interactive map of Consto Arena
- Former names: Isachsen Stadion; Mjøndalen Stadion; Nedre Eiker Stadion
- Location: Mjøndalen, Nedre Eiker, Norway
- Coordinates: 59.7469°N 10.0146°E
- Capacity: 4,350
- Surface: Artificial turf
- Record attendance: 15,300
- Field size: 106 m x 67 m

Construction
- Built: 1950
- Renovated: 1958 (new grass); 1985 (new seats); 1992 (new wardrobe); 2012 (complete rebuild); 2015 (expansion)
- Expanded: 1968

Tenant
- Mjøndalen IF Fotball (1950–present)

Consto Arena (until 2012 known as Nedre Eiker Stadion, between 2012 and 2015 as Mjøndalen Stadion and between 2015 and 2018 as Isachsen Stadion) is a football stadium located at Mjøndalen in Nedre Eiker, Norway. It is the home ground of Mjøndalen IF in the Eliteserien, providing a capacity for 4,350 spectators.

== History ==
Nedre Eiker Stadion was opened in 1950. During the team's golden age from the late 1960s through the 1980s, the stadium hosted several UEFA Cup and UEFA Cup Winners' Cup games. The record attendance dates from 1968, when 15,300 people attended the Norwegian Football Cup semi-final against Rosenborg.

The venue was completely renovated in 2011-12 and received artificial turf with under-soil heating. The stadium got a new main stand with an under-roof seated capacity of 1,500 spectators and was renamed to Mjøndalen Stadion after the renovation. After promotion to the 2015 Tippeligaen season, Mjøndalen increased the capacity to 4,350 and sold the stadium name to the contractor, Isachsen Gruppen.

=== Naming rights ===
Ahead of the 2015 season, the stadium's naming rights was sold in a four-year deal to contractor company Isachsen Gruppen.

On 1 January 2019, the stadium name was changed to Consto Arena after its naming rights were sold to entrepreneur group Consto AS. The rights was bought in a three-year deal with possibilities for a one-year extension.
