= 2016 Norwegian First Division =

1. divisjon
- Season: 2016
- Dates: 3 April – 30 October
- Champions: Kristiansund
- Promoted: Kristiansund; Sandefjord
- Relegated: Bryne; Hødd; KFUM Oslo; Raufoss
- Matches: 300
- Goals: 696 (2.32 per match)
- Top goalscorer: Pontus Engblom (26 goals)
- Biggest home win: Ullensaker/Kisa 8–3 Hødd
- Biggest away win: Fredrikstad 1–7 Ranheim
- Highest scoring: Ullensaker/Kisa 8–3 Hødd
- Longest winning run: 10 games Sandefjord
- Longest winless run: 10 games Raufoss
- Average attendance: 1,495 ▼25.2%

The 2016 1. divisjon (referred to as OBOS-ligaen for sponsorship reasons) was a Norwegian second-tier football league season. The league was contested by 16 teams, and the top two teams were promoted to Tippeligaen, while the teams placed from third to sixth place played a promotion-playoff against the 14th-placed team in Tippeligaen to win promotion. The bottom four teams were relegated to the 2. divisjon.

The first round of the season was played on 3 April 2016 and the season concluded with the last round on 30 October 2016. The playoff-tournament was played between 6 and 21 November 2016.

== Team changes from 2015 ==
In the 2015 1. divisjon, Sogndal, and Brann won promotion to Tippeligaen, while Follo, Nest-Sotra, Bærum and Hønefoss were relegated to the 2016 2. divisjon.

Mjøndalen, and Sandefjord, were relegated from the 2015 Tippeligaen, while KFUM Oslo, Raufoss, Ull/Kisa and Kongsvinger were promoted from the 2015 2. divisjon.

== Teams ==
Locations of the teams in the 2016 1. divisjon

Team	Location	Arena	Capacity	Manager
Bryne	Bryne	Bryne Stadion	10,000	(Norway) Alf Ingve Berntsen
Fredrikstad	Fredrikstad	Fredrikstad Stadion	12,565	(Norway) Jan Halvor Halvorsen
Hødd	Ulsteinvik	Høddvoll Stadion	3,825	(Norway) Hans-Erik Eriksen
Jerv	Grimstad	J.J. Ugland Stadion – Levermyr	1,750	(Norway) Arne Sandstø
KFUM	Oslo	KFUM Arena	1,500	(Norway) Ståle Andersen
Kongsvinger	Kongsvinger	Gjemselund Stadion	6,700	(Portugal) Luis Berkemeier Pimenta
Kristiansund	Kristiansund	Kristiansund Stadion	3,000	(Norway) Christian Michelsen
Levanger	Levanger	Moan Fritidspark	6,000	(Sweden) Magnus Powell
Mjøndalen	Mjøndalen	Isachsen Stadion	4,350	(Norway) Vegard Hansen
Ranheim	Trondheim	DNB Arena	2,000	(Norway) Svein Maalen
Raufoss	Raufoss	Nammo Stadion	2,500	(Norway) Espen Haug
Sandefjord	Sandefjord	Komplett.no Arena	6,000	(Norway) Lars Bohinen
Sandnes Ulf	Sandnes	Sandnes Idrettspark	4,969	(Norway) Bengt Sæternes
Strømmen	Strømmen	Strømmen Stadion	1,800	(Norway) Espen Olsen
Ull/Kisa	Jessheim	UKI Arena	3,000	(Norway) Vegard Skogheim
Åsane	Åsane	Åsane Idrettspark	3,000	(Norway) Kjetil Knutsen

=== Managerial changes ===
Team	Outgoing manager	Manner of departure	Date of vacancy	Table	Incoming manager	Date of appointment	Table
Fredrikstad	(Norway) Arne Erlandsen	Contract expired	11 November 2015	Pre-season	(Norway) Jan Halvor Halvorsen	23 November 2015	Pre-season
Ranheim	(Norway) Ola By Rise	Contract expired	30 November 2015	Pre-season	(Norway) Svein Maalen	1 December 2015	Pre-season
Ull/Kisa	(Sweden) Jonas Olsson	Contract expired	3 December 2015	Pre-season	(Norway) Vegard Skogheim	1 January 2016	Pre-season
Jerv	(Norway) Steinar Pedersen	Start's new coach	23 December 2015	Pre-season	(Norway) Arne Sandstø	15 January 2016	Pre-season
Hødd	(Norway) Sindre Eid	Resigned	31 December 2015	Pre-season	(Norway) Hans-Erik Eriksen	1 January 2016	Pre-season
Levanger	(Sweden) Andreas Holmberg	Contract expired	31 December 2015	Pre-season	(Sweden) Magnus Powell	1 January 2016	Pre-season
Bryne	(Norway) Gaute Larsen	Resigned	14 May 2016	12th	(Norway) Alf Ingve Berntsen	14 May 2016	12th
Fredrikstad	(Norway) Jan Halvor Halvorsen	Resigned	09 Aug 2016	14th	(Norway) Mons Ivar Mjelde	09 Aug 2016	14th

== League table ==
Pos	Team	Pld	W	D	L	GF	GA	GD	Pts	Promotion, qualification or relegation
1	Kristiansund (C, P)	30	19	5	6	47	30	+17	62	Promotion to Eliteserien
2	Sandefjord (P)	30	18	5	7	54	35	+19	59	Promotion to Eliteserien
3	Jerv	30	15	8	7	47	34	+13	53	Qualification for the promotion play-offs
4	Sandnes Ulf	30	15	6	9	55	28	+27	51	Qualification for the promotion play-offs
5	Kongsvinger	30	14	7	9	56	42	+14	49	Qualification for the promotion play-offs
6	Mjøndalen	30	13	10	7	49	38	+11	49	Qualification for the promotion play-offs
7	Strømmen	30	13	8	9	46	45	+1	47	
8	Levanger	30	13	6	11	52	46	+6	45	
9	Ranheim	30	11	6	13	45	48	−3	39	
10	Åsane	30	10	8	12	36	37	−1	38	
11	Fredrikstad	30	8	9	13	34	48	−14	33	
12	Ull/Kisa	30	8	8	14	47	50	−3	32	
13	Bryne (R)	30	7	9	14	33	48	−15	30	Relegation to Second Division
14	Hødd (R)	30	8	6	16	31	57	−26	30	Relegation to Second Division
15	KFUM Oslo (R)	30	6	8	16	31	48	−17	26	Relegation to Second Division
16	Raufoss (R)	30	6	3	21	33	62	−29	21	Relegation to Second Division

Source: nifs.no (in Norwegian), Soccerway
Rules for classification: 1) Points; 2) Goal difference; 3) Goals scored; 4) Head-to-head points; 5) Head-to-head goal difference; 6) Head-to-head away goals scored (only if between two teams); 7) Head-to-head goals scored; 8) Play-off (only used to decide champions or relegation).
(C) Champions; (P) Promoted; (R) Relegated

== Results ==
Home \ Away	BRY	FFK	HØD	JER	KFU	KIL	KBK	LEV	MIF	RAN	RAU	SAN	ULF	STR	UKI	ÅSF
Bryne	—	3–1	0–0	0–1	0–1	1–1	2–2	4–3	3–0	1–1	2–0	0–2	1–0	0–1	1–1	3–1
Fredrikstad	2–1	—	1–0	2–1	1–1	1–1	0–1	2–3	0–1	1–7	1–1	1–2	0–0	2–1	5–1	3–2
Hødd	1–1	2–2	—	0–2	1–2	2–2	1–0	3–2	2–1	2–0	1–0	1–3	2–0	0–3	1–0	3–0
Jerv	1–3	1–0	5–1	—	1–1	3–2	1–1	0–1	1–1	2–1	4–0	2–2	2–0	2–2	1–0	2–0
KFUM Oslo	3–0	2–2	1–1	0–1	—	1–2	0–0	5–0	0–1	3–2	0–3	1–2	1–3	1–3	0–0	0–2
Kongsvinger	2–0	1–2	2–1	5–0	2–0	—	1–3	1–2	3–1	1–0	3–2	1–0	1–2	2–2	2–3	2–0
Kristiansund	2–1	0–0	2–0	2–0	3–2	1–2	—	1–0	0–2	3–1	2–1	3–2	2–3	2–0	1–0	2–1
Levanger	4–0	1–0	2–0	1–2	0–3	2–2	1–3	—	2–2	1–2	3–0	1–0	0–2	2–2	3–1	1–0
Mjøndalen	3–0	4–0	3–0	1–1	2–0	2–1	3–1	2–2	—	6–2	1–1	2–2	1–0	1–1	0–0	2–0
Ranheim	1–0	0–0	2–1	1–4	2–0	0–3	0–1	3–1	2–2	—	1–0	3–0	0–2	4–1	2–2	1–1
Raufoss	5–1	2–1	2–0	0–1	0–0	2–4	1–2	0–6	1–0	1–2	—	0–2	1–2	4–5	2–1	1–2
Sandefjord	1–0	2–1	3–0	3–2	3–0	1–3	0–0	1–2	2–0	3–1	3–1	—	2–2	4–1	1–0	2–0
Sandnes Ulf	1–1	3–1	5–0	0–1	6–2	1–1	0–1	1–1	5–0	2–0	3–0	5–0	—	1–0	4–0	0–2
Strømmen	2–2	0–0	2–1	2–1	2–1	2–1	1–3	2–1	0–0	2–1	4–0	0–3	3–1	—	2–1	0–0
Ull/Kisa	3–0	1–2	8–3	1–1	3–0	2–2	2–3	1–3	5–1	2–2	2–1	1–2	1–1	2–0	—	1–0
Åsane	2–2	3–0	1–1	1–1	0–0	3–0	2–0	1–1	1–4	0–1	3–1	1–1	1–0	2–0	4–2	—

Source: NIFS (in Norwegian)
Legend: Blue = home team win; Yellow = draw; Red = away team win.

== Promotion play-offs ==
The third to sixth-placed teams took part in the promotion play-offs; these were single leg knockout matches, two semi-finals and a final. The winners, Jerv, advanced to play Stabæk over two legs in the Tippeligaen play-offs for a spot in the top-flight next season.

=== Semi-finals ===
5 November 2016
18:00 CET (UTC+1)

Sandnes Ulf	0–2	Kongsvinger
	Report	Güven 9', 90+3'

Sandnes Idrettspark, Sandnes
Attendance: 1,262
Referee: Rohit Saggi
19 November 2016
12:00 CET (UTC+1)

Jerv	2–1	Mjøndalen
Haugstad 9'; Brochmann 60'	Report	Sylling Olsen 57'

Levermyr Stadion, Grimstad
Attendance: 1,100
Referee: Kristoffer Hagenes
1. The match began originally on 5 November 2016, but was suspended in the 45th minute at 1–0 to Jerv, due to heavy rain; remaining minutes were played on 19 November 2016.

=== Final ===
26 November 2016
12:00 CET (UTC+1)

Jerv	2–1	Kongsvinger
Andersen 32'; Brochmann 38'	Report	Maikel 16'

Levermyr Stadion, Grimstad
Attendance: 1,370
Referee: Trygve Kjensli

== Season statistics ==
=== Top scorers ===
Rank	Player	Club	Goals	Games	Average
1	(Sweden) Pontus Engblom	Sandnes Ulf	26	30	0,87
2	(Ivory Coast) Daouda Bamba	Kristiansund	20	28	0,71
3	(Norway) Robert Stene	Ranheim	18	30	0,60
4	(Norway) Geir André Herrem	Åsane	14	22	0,64
4	(Norway) Adem Güven	Kongsvinger	14	25	0,56
4	(Norway) Kjell Rune Sellin	Sandefjord	14	30	0,47
4	(Norway) Benjamin Stokke	Levanger	14	30	0,47
8	(Norway) Kent Håvard Eriksen	Sandnes Ulf	13	25	0,52
9	(Denmark) Sanel Kapidžić	Fredrikstad	12	28	0,43
9	(Northern Ireland) Robin Shroot	Hødd	12	30	0,40
11	(Norway) Mats Moldskred	Kongsvinger	11	25	0,44
11	(Norway) Nicolay Solberg	Ull/Kisa	11	28	0,39
