= Notodden FK =

Norwegian football club

- Full name: Notodden Fotballklubb
- Nickname: NFK
- Founded: 3 November 1999; 27 years ago
- Ground: Idrettsparken, Notodden, Norway
- Capacity: c. 3,000 (716 seated)
- Chairman: Kjetil Holta
- Manager: Stian Lund
- League: 2. divisjon
- 2024: 2. divisjon group 1, 9th of 14
Home colours	Away colours

Notodden Fotballklubb is a Norwegian football club located in the town of Notodden in Notodden Municipality. The team currently plays in 2. divisjon, the third tier of the Norwegian football league system.

It was founded in 1999 as a merger between the football departments of SK Snøgg and Heddal IL ahead of the 2000 season.

After playing in the 2. divisjon for several years, Notodden was finally promoted to 1. divisjon ahead of the 2018 season. They were promoted due to winning play-off qualification against Fredrikstad FK from 1. divisjon over two matches (0–0 away and 5–3 home).

== Recent history ==
Season		Pos.	Pl.	W	D	L	GS	GA	P	Cup	Notes
2006	2. divisjon	↑ 1	26	16	10	0	66	26	58	Second round	Promoted
2007	1. divisjon	9	30	11	3	16	49	54	36	Fourth round	
2008	1. divisjon	6	30	12	10	8	55	40	46	Second round	
2009	1. divisjon	↓ 14	30	9	2	19	38	55	29	Third round	Relegated
2010	2. divisjon	2	26	16	3	7	71	25	51	Second round	
2011	2. divisjon	↑ 1	26	22	2	2	79	23	68	Third round	Promoted
2012	1. divisjon	↓ 15	30	6	4	20	38	71	22	Third round	Relegated
2013	2. divisjon	3	26	13	3	10	48	34	42	First round	
2014	2. divisjon	5	26	15	3	8	50	42	48	Third round	
2015	2. divisjon	5	26	13	6	7	68	43	45	Third round	
2016	2. divisjon	3	26	13	6	7	55	35	45	Second round	
2017	2. divisjon	↑ 2	26	17	3	6	53	26	54	Third round	Promoted
2018	1. divisjon	12	30	10	6	14	36	40	36	Third round	
2019	1. divisjon	↓ 14	30	6	7	17	35	53	25	Second round	Relegated
2020	2. divisjon	9	13	5	1	7	16	24	16	Cancelled	
2021	2. divisjon	6	26	11	6	9	53	43	39	Second round	
2022	2. divisjon	11	24	6	6	12	29	45	23	Second round	
2023	2. divisjon	5	26	11	6	9	41	38	36	First round	

== Current squad ==
As of 3 September 2026

Note: Flags indicate national team as defined under FIFA eligibility rules; some limited exceptions apply. Players may hold more than one non-FIFA nationality.

No.	Pos.	Nation	Player
1	GK	NOR	Sondre Solås
2	DF	NOR	Julian Gunnerød (on loan from Odd)
3	DF	NOR	Henrik Halten Olsen
4	DF	NOR	Jone Hammerli
5	DF	NOR	Mahmud Mustafa Ahmed
6	MF	NOR	Sondre Larsen
7	FW	NOR	Jørgen Galta
8	MF	NOR	Sebastian Rønningen Jørgensen
9	FW	NOR	Erik Leandersson
10	MF	NOR	Andreas Pettersen
11	FW	NOR	Hans Torjus Gampedalen
12	GK	NOR	Jan Bergesen

No.	Pos.	Nation	Player
14	FW	NOR	Trym Foss-Erstad
16	DF	NOR	Noah Bertelsen
17	MF	NOR	Andreas Kalstad
20	FW	NOR	Balder Bjerkan
21	MF	NOR	Siver Murtnes
22	MF	NOR	Tor André Nordbø
23	FW	NOR	Anders Hartveit Ryste
26	FW	NOR	Bjørnar Tobiassen
27	MF	NOR	Marcus Wenneberg
31	GK	NOR	Sondre Straand
—	DF	NOR	Noah Jacobsen
