= Mjøndalen =

Area in Buskerud county, Norway

Coordinates: 59°45′N 10°01′E

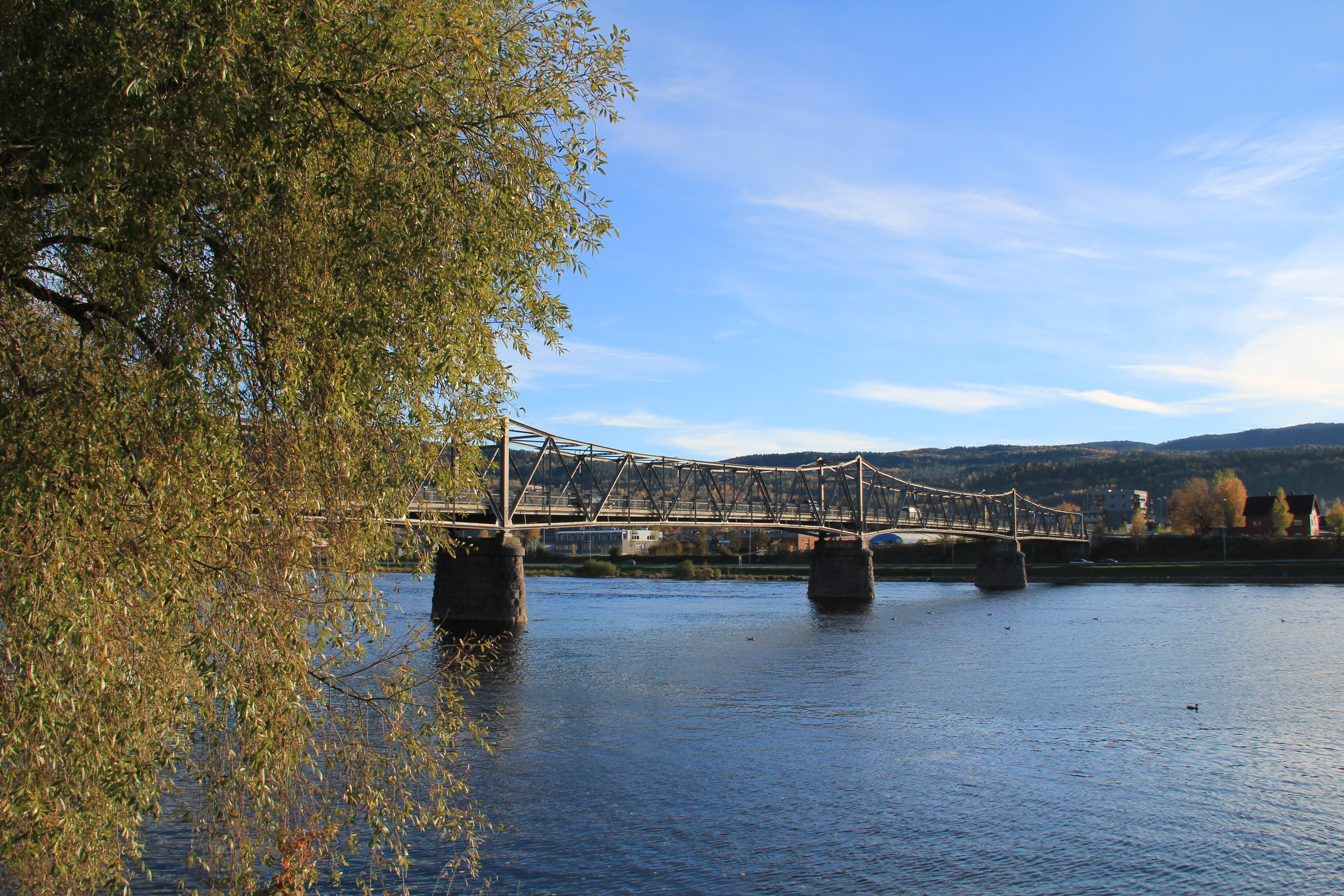
- Mjøndalsbrua over Drammenselva connecting Mjøndalen and Krokstadelva
- Interactive map of Mjøndalen

Population
  - Estimate: 8,000

Mjøndalen is a built up area in Drammen municipality in Buskerud county, Norway. It is situated south of the Drammenselva River opposite of Krokstadelva.

== History ==
Mjøndalen has traditionally been a railway site most known as an industrial sawmill location. Historically Mjøndalen was known for its industry; including paper & pulp production and a substantial cellulose industry. The production of wood products and furniture are also traditional commercial activities. All the paper mills closed in the late 1960s and early 1970s.

== Sports and media ==
Mjøndalen has a friendly sports rivalry with the neighbouring communities of Solbergelva and Krokstadelva. The rivalry is mostly in sports such as football and bandy and cross-country skiing. In football, Mjøndalen IF Fotball plays in Eliteserien, the top tier in the Norwegian league system. In bandy, Mjøndalen IF have become Norwegian champions several times. The newspaper Eikerbladet is published in Mjøndalen.

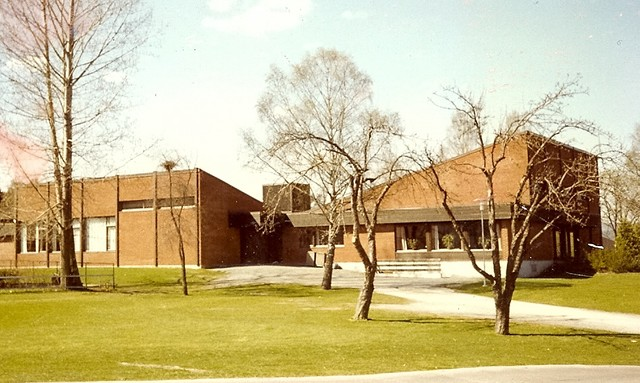
Mjøndalen Church

== Mjøndalen Church ==
Mjøndalen Church (Mjøndalen Kirke) was opened in 1983. It was built after drawings by architect Elisabeth Breen Fidjestøl. The building was constructed of brick and wood and has 380 seats. The building consists of the church sanctuary and adjacent church hall, offices, chapel and youth department and group rooms. As of 2020, the church was moved from Eiker prosti to Drammen Prosti, which is a part of the Diocese of Tunsberg. This happened as a result of the municipal merger between Nedre Eiker and Drammen municipality.

== Portåsen ==
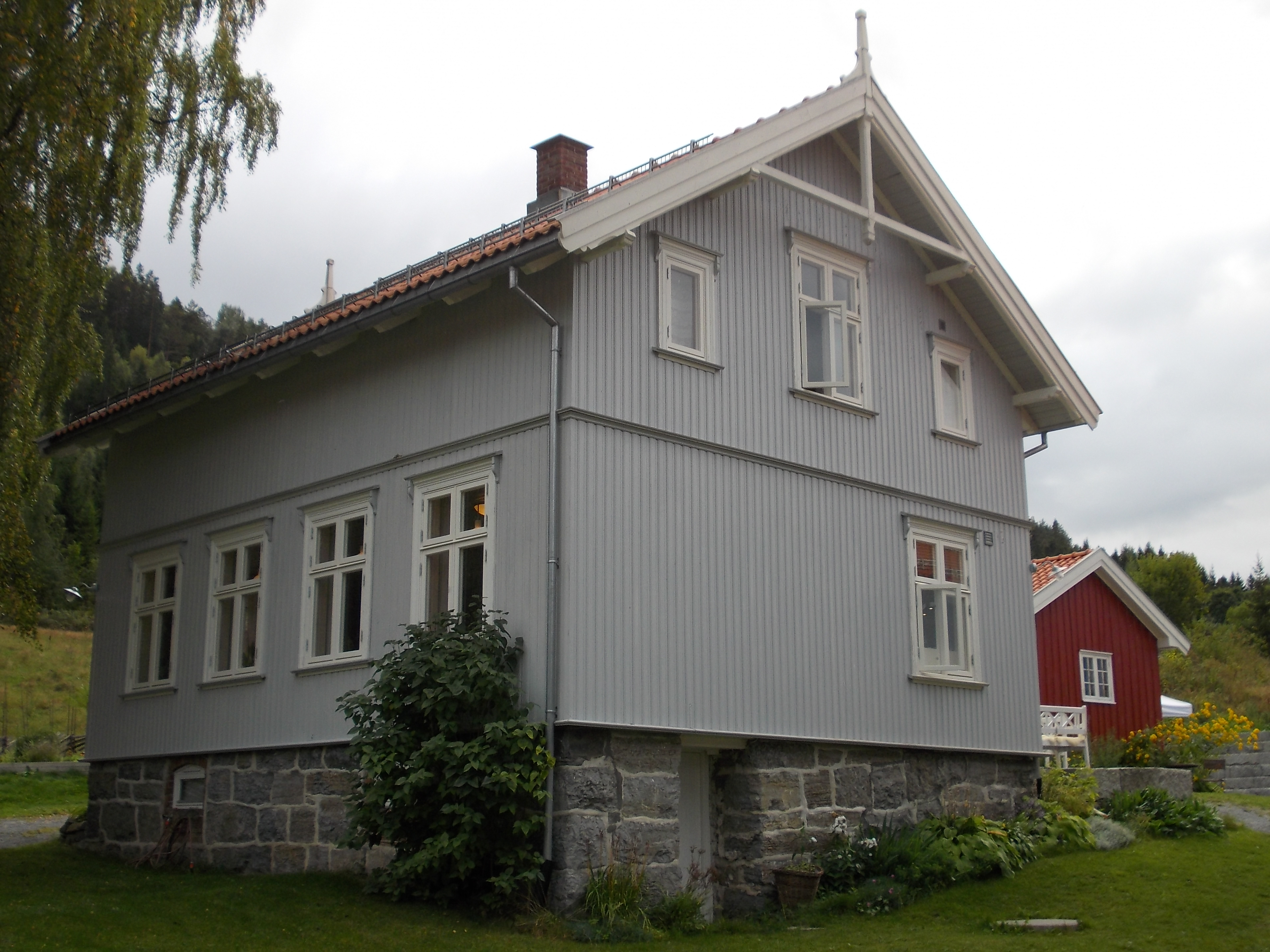
Portåsen - childhood home of poet Herman Wildenvey

Portåsen is a museum honouring the life and writing of Herman Wildenvey, a prominent Norwegian poet. He lived in Mjøndalen as a young child and later moved to a farm near the village.

tiftelsen Portåsen is the organization which works on the development of Portåsen and which operates in affiliation with Buskerud Museum (Buskerudmuseet), a foundation for the preservation of cultural heritage within Buskerud.
