= 2012 Norwegian First Division =

1. divisjon
- Season: 2012
- Dates: 9 April – 11 November
- Champions: Start
- Promoted: Start; Sarpsborg 08
- Relegated: Tromsdalen; Bærum; Notodden; Alta
- Matches: 240
- Goals: 785 (3.27 per match)
- Top goalscorer: Martin Wiig (20 goals)
- Biggest home win: Ranheim 7–0 Kongsvinger (20 May 2012)
- Biggest away win: HamKam 0–5 Kongsvinger (5 August 2012)
- Highest scoring: HamKam 7–2 Tromsdalen (15 July 2012); Bærum 5–4 Bryne (9 September 2012)
- Highest attendance: 5,760, at home match of Start
- Lowest attendance: 94, at home match of Bærum

The 2012 1. divisjon (referred to as Adeccoligaen for sponsorship reasons) was a Norwegian second-tier football season. The season began on 9 April 2012 and ended on 11 November 2012.

Two clubs, Start and Sarpsborg, were relegated from the 2011 Tippeligaen, while Notodden, Tromsdalen, Ull/Kisa, and Bærum were promoted from the 2011 2. divisjon.

Asker, Nybergsund-Trysil, Randaberg and Løv-Ham were relegated to the 2012 2. divisjon

At the end of the season, the two best teams were promoted to the 2013 Tippeligaen, while the four worst placed teams were relegated to the 2013 2. divisjon.

== Teams ==
Locations of the teams in the 2012 1. divisjon

Team	Location	Arena	Capacity	Manager
Alta	Alta	Finnmarkshallen	1,000	Rune Berger
Bodø/Glimt	Bodø	Aspmyra Stadion	7,400	Cato André Hansen
Bryne	Bryne	Bryne Stadion	10,000	Gaute Larsen
Bærum	Sandvika	Sandvika Stadion	1,500	Morten Tandberg
HamKam	Hamar	Briskeby Arena	10,200	Vegard Skogheim
Hødd	Ulsteinvik	Høddvoll Stadion	3,120	Lars Arne Nilsen
Kongsvinger	Kongsvinger	Gjemselund Stadion	5,202	Tom Nordlie
Mjøndalen	Mjøndalen	Nedre Eiker Stadion	2,600	Vegard Hansen
Notodden	Notodden	Notodden Stadion	3,000	Kenneth Dokken
Ranheim	Ranheim	DnB NOR Arena	2,000	Aasmund Bjørkan
Sandefjord	Sandefjord	Komplett.no Arena	9,000	Arne Sandstø
Sarpsborg 08	Sarpsborg	Sarpsborg Stadion	5,000	Roar Johansen
IK Start	Kristiansand	Sør Arena	14,300	Mons Ivar Mjelde
Strømmen	Strømmen	Strømmen Stadion	3,000	Erland Johnsen
Tromsdalen	Tromsø	Tromsdalen Stadion	3,000	Morten Pedersen
Ull/Kisa	Jessheim	UKI Arena	3,000	Arne Erlandsen

=== Managerial changes ===
Team	Outgoing manager	Manner of departure	Date of vacancy	Table	Incoming manager	Date of appointment	Table
Strømmen	Thomas Berntsen	Contract expired	31 December 2011	Pre-season	Erland Johnsen	1 January 2012	Pre-season
Notodden	Brede Halvorsen	Resigned	20 August 2012	14th	Kenneth Dokken	24 August 2012	14th
Bryne	Tommy Bergersen	Mutual consent	10 September 2012	12th	Gaute Larsen	10 September 2012	12th

== League table ==
Pos	Team	Pld	W	D	L	GF	GA	GD	Pts	Promotion or relegation
1	Start (C, P)	30	20	6	4	71	35	+36	66	Promotion to Tippeligaen
2	Sarpsborg 08 (P)	30	19	6	5	73	43	+30	63	Promotion to Tippeligaen
3	Sandefjord	30	16	7	7	44	29	+15	55	Qualification for the promotion play-offs
4	Mjøndalen	30	16	7	7	52	43	+9	55	Qualification for the promotion play-offs
5	Bodø/Glimt	30	13	9	8	59	36	+23	48	Qualification for the promotion play-offs
6	Ullensaker/Kisa	30	14	2	14	45	39	+6	44	Qualification for the promotion play-offs
7	Ranheim	30	11	10	9	55	40	+15	43	
8	HamKam (Note: HamKam were deducted 2 points for lack of financial control)	30	13	6	11	51	49	+2	43	
9	Kongsvinger	30	12	3	15	44	48	−4	39	
10	Bryne	30	10	8	12	41	53	−12	38	
11	Strømmen	30	10	7	13	39	51	−12	37	
12	Hødd	30	10	5	15	43	52	−9	35	Qualification for the Europa League second qualifying round (Note: Hødd qualified for the second qualifying round of the UEFA Europa League as winners of the 2012 Norwegian Cup.)
13	Tromsdalen (R)	30	10	5	15	51	62	−11	35	Relegation to Second Division
14	Bærum (R)	30	5	7	18	49	73	−24	22	Relegation to Second Division
15	Notodden (R)	30	6	4	20	38	71	−33	22	Relegation to Second Division
16	Alta (Note: Alta were deducted 1 point for lack of financial control) (R)	30	4	10	16	30	61	−31	21	Relegation to Second Division

Source: nifs.no
Rules for classification: 1) points; 2) goal difference; 3) number of goals scored.
(C) Champions; (P) Promoted; (R) Relegated

=== Promotion play-offs ===
Start and Sarpsborg were directly promoted, and five teams entered a play-off for the last Tippeligaen spot in the 2013 season. These were:

- A) Sandnes Ulf (by virtue of being the 14th placed team in the Tippeligaen)
- B) Sandefjord (by virtue of being the third placed team in the Adeccoligaen)
- C) Mjøndalen (by virtue of being the fourth placed team in the Adeccoligaen)
- D) Bodø/Glimt (by virtue of being the fifth placed team in the Adeccoligaen)
- E) Ullensaker/Kisa (by virtue of being the sixth placed team in the Adeccoligaen)

The four Adeccoligaen teams first played a single game knockout tournament, with the winner (Ull/Kisa) advancing to a two-legged tie against the Tippeligaen team (Sandnes Ulf) for the 16th and final spot in the 2013 season. Sandnes Ulf retained their Tippeligaen spot with an aggregate 7–1 win over Ull/Kisa.

First round
3	Sandefjord	3
6	Ullensaker/Kisa	4
4	Mjøndalen	1
5	Bodø/Glimt	2

Second round
6	Ullensaker/Kisa	2
5	Bodø/Glimt	0

Final round
14	Sandnes Ulf	7 (4+3)
6	Ullensaker/Kisa	1 (0+1)

== Results ==
Home \ Away	ALT	BOD	BRY	BÆR	HK	ILH	KIL	MIF	NFK	RF	SF	S08	IKS	SIF	TUIL	ULL
Alta	—	1–1	3–2	3–3	0–0	5–0	1–1	0–1	1–0	1–1	0–1	1–3	0–2	2–3	3–2	1–3
Bodø/Glimt	1–0	—	4–1	3–1	3–1	4–0	1–1	2–2	6–0	0–3	4–0	2–3	5–0	0–0	3–2	1–0
Bryne	1–1	2–1	—	3–1	0–1	1–0	2–1	2–2	2–1	0–1	0–1	4–3	0–3	3–1	2–2	0–2
Bærum	1–1	3–3	5–4	—	1–2	1–2	4–1	0–3	6–0	2–2	1–3	2–4	2–3	0–0	1–2	1–3
HamKam	3–0	0–0	1–1	3–1	—	2–0	0–5	1–1	1–0	2–1	2–3	3–5	1–2	2–3	7–2	2–1
Hødd	1–1	2–1	0–1	2–0	5–0	—	0–2	3–0	2–1	1–3	1–0	2–1	0–0	4–1	4–3	1–3
Kongsvinger	4–0	1–2	1–2	6–2	0–3	2–1	—	0–2	3–1	2–2	2–0	1–3	0–1	2–1	2–0	1–0
Mjøndalen	4–0	2–1	1–1	2–1	4–2	2–1	2–1	—	2–2	2–1	0–3	0–2	3–0	3–2	3–0	2–1
Notodden	4–1	0–4	3–0	2–2	0–3	2–2	3–1	0–2	—	2–3	3–0	0–1	2–1	2–0	1–5	1–2
Ranheim	2–1	1–1	0–0	3–1	1–1	1–1	7–0	1–2	3–2	—	1–2	1–2	1–1	1–2	4–1	3–0
Sandefjord	2–2	2–1	2–0	0–0	2–0	1–0	1–0	1–1	3–3	3–0	—	1–2	1–1	1–0	1–2	2–0
Sarpsborg 08	6–0	1–1	2–2	1–0	4–1	2–2	1–2	3–1	3–2	2–2	0–3	—	4–4	4–0	2–0	2–1
Start	4–0	3–0	3–1	4–0	3–1	2–1	3–0	3–1	7–0	2–2	1–0	3–4	—	3–1	3–3	2–0
Strømmen	1–0	1–1	1–1	1–2	0–4	4–2	1–0	2–2	2–1	2–1	1–1	0–2	1–2	—	5–0	2–1
Tromsdalen	1–1	3–0	5–1	2–3	1–1	3–2	2–1	2–0	1–0	1–3	0–3	0–0	1–2	3–0	—	1–2
Ull/Kisa	3–0	0–3	1–2	5–2	0–1	3–1	0–1	5–0	2–0	1–0	1–1	2–1	0–3	1–1	2–1	—

Source: NIFS (in Norwegian)
Legend: Blue = home team win; Yellow = draw; Red = away team win.

== Season statistics ==
=== Top scorers ===
Rank	Player	Club	Goals	Games	Average
1	(Norway) Martin Wiig	Sarpsborg 08	20	27	0.74
2	(Iceland) Matthías Vilhjálmsson	Start	18	29	0.60
3	(Norway) Tore Andreas Gundersen	HamKam	16	26	0.62
4	(Norway) Nicolay Solberg	Sarpsborg 08	14	30	0.47
5	(Norway) Øyvind Hoås	Sarpsborg 08	13	28	0.46
6	(Norway) Rozhat Shaswari	Bærum	12	21	0.57
6	(Norway) Olav Tuelo Johannesen	Kongsvinger	12	26	0.46
6	(Norway) Håvard Lysvoll	Tromsdalen	12	28	0.43
9	(Norway) Robert Stene	Ranheim	11	19	0.58
9	(Norway) Magnus Nikolaisen	Alta	11	26	0.42
9	(Ghana) Ernest Asante	Start	11	29	0.38
9	(Norway) Thomas Lehne Olsen	HamKam	11	30	0.37
11	(Norway) Jim Johansen	Bodø/Glimt	10	24	0.42
11	(Norway) Pål André Helland	Hødd	10	26	0.38
11	(Norway) Vegard Braaten	Bodø/Glimt	10	28	0.36
11	(Norway) Jo Sondre Aas	Sandefjord	10	30	0.33

Source: Alt om fotball
