= 2014 Norwegian First Division =

Norwegian second-tier football league season

1. divisjon
- Season: 2014
- Dates: 6 April – 2 November
- Champions: Sandefjord
- Promoted: Sandefjord; Tromsø; Mjøndalen
- Relegated: Alta; Tromsdalen; Ullensaker/Kisa; HamKam
- Matches: 240
- Goals: 738 (3.08 per match)
- Top goalscorer: Pål Alexander Kirkevold (19 goals)
- Biggest home win: Strømmen 6–0 Hønefoss; Kristiansund 6–0 Alta; Strømmen 6–1 HamKam
- Biggest away win: Hødd 2–5 Nest-Sotra
- Highest scoring: Strømmen 5–3 Ullensaker/Kisa
- Longest unbeaten run: 29 games Sandefjord
- Longest winless run: 14 games HamKam

The 2014 1. divisjon was a Norwegian second-tier football league season. The league was contested by 16 teams, and the top two teams won promotion to Tippeligaen, while the teams placed from third to sixth place played a promotion-playoff against the 14th-placed team in Tippeligaen to win promotion. The bottom four teams were relegated to the 2. divisjon.

The first round of the season was played on 6 April 2014 and ended with the last round on 2 November 2014.

== Team changes from 2013 ==
In the 2013 1. divisjon, Bodø/Glimt and Stabæk won promotion to Tippeligaen, while Tromsø and Hønefoss were relegated to the 1. divisjon.

Elverum, Follo, Kongsvinger and Vard Haugesund were relegated from the 2013 1. division, while Bærum, Alta, Nest-Sotra and Tromsdalen were promoted from the 2013 2. divisjon.

== Teams ==
Locations of the teams in the 2014 Adeccoligaen

Team	Location	Arena	Capacity	Manager
Alta	Alta	Finnmarkshallen	1,000	Rune Berger
Bryne	Bryne	Bryne Stadion	10,000	Gaute Larsen
Bærum	Sandvika	Sandvika Stadion	1,500	Morten Tandberg
Fredrikstad	Fredrikstad	Fredrikstad Stadion	12,560	Trond Amundsen
HamKam	Hamar	Briskeby gressbane	10,200	Chris Twiddy
Hødd	Ulsteinvik	Høddvoll Stadion	3,120	Lars Arne Nilsen
Hønefoss	Hønefoss	Aka Arena	4,256	Rune Skarsfjord
Kristiansund	Kristiansund	Atlanten Stadion	4,000	Christian Michelsen
Mjøndalen	Mjøndalen	Mjøndalen Stadion	2,100	Vegard Hansen
Nest-Sotra	Sotra	Ågotnes Stadion	2,000	Ruben Hetlevik
Ranheim	Trondheim	DNB Arena	2,000	Trond Nordsteien
Sandefjord	Sandefjord	Komplett.no Arena	9,000	Lars Bohinen
Strømmen	Strømmen	Strømmen Stadion	1,800	Erland Johnsen
Tromsdalen	Tromsø	Tromsdalen Stadion	3,000	Gaute Helstrup
Tromsø	Tromsø	Alfheim Stadion	6,859	Steinar Nilsen
Ull/Kisa	Jessheim	UKI Arena	3,000	Tommy Berntsen

=== Managerial changes ===
Team	Outgoing manager	Manner of departure	Date of vacancy	Table	Incoming manager	Date of appointment	Table
Hønefoss	Leif Gunnar Smerud	Mutual consent	23 November 2013	Pre-season	Roar Johansen	20 December 2013	Pre-season
Ullensaker/Kisa	Roar Johansen	Signed by Hønefoss	20 December 2013	Pre-season	Tommy Berntsen	4 January 2014	Pre-season
Sandefjord	Arne Sandstø	End of contract	31 December 2013	Pre-season	Lars Bohinen	1 January 2014	Pre-Season
Kristiansund	Geir Bakke	Signed by Molde FK	17 January 2014	Pre-season	Christian Michelsen	6 February 2014	Pre-Season
HamKam	Vegard Skogheim	Resigned	23 April 2014	16th	Peter Sørensen	15 May 2014	16th
Hønefoss	Roar Johansen	Mutual consent	5 June 2014	14th	Rune Skarsfjord	6 June 2014	14th
HamKam	Peter Sørensen	Resigned	4 July 2014	16th	Svein Inge Haagenrud	4 July 2014	16th
Nest-Sotra	Alexander Straus	Signed by Strømsgodset IF	13 August 2014	?	Ruben Hetlevik	21 August 2014	?
HamKam	Svein Inge Haagenrud	Resigned	30 August 2014	16th	Chris Twiddy	30 August 2014	16th

== League table ==
Pos	Team	Pld	W	D	L	GF	GA	GD	Pts	Promotion, qualification or relegation
1	Sandefjord (C, P)	30	20	9	1	62	24	+38	69	Promotion to Tippeligaen
2	Tromsø (P)	30	18	5	7	67	27	+40	59	Promotion to Tippeligaen
3	Mjøndalen (O, P)	30	14	9	7	57	36	+21	51	Qualification for the promotion play-offs
4	Kristiansund BK	30	13	10	7	53	39	+14	49	Qualification for the promotion play-offs
5	Bærum	30	15	4	11	51	52	−1	49	Qualification for the promotion play-offs
6	Fredrikstad	30	14	6	10	35	26	+9	48	Qualification for the promotion play-offs
7	Ranheim	30	13	7	10	45	34	+11	46	
8	Hødd	30	12	7	11	48	49	−1	43	
9	Bryne	30	13	3	14	48	55	−7	42	
10	Strømmen	30	11	8	11	59	54	+5	41	
11	Hønefoss	30	12	4	14	39	55	−16	40	
12	Nest-Sotra	30	10	7	13	49	51	−2	37	
13	Alta (R)	30	9	7	14	33	51	−18	34	Relegation to Second Division
14	Tromsdalen (R)	30	8	7	15	44	56	−12	31	Relegation to Second Division
15	Ullensaker/Kisa (R)	30	6	5	19	26	51	−25	23	Relegation to Second Division
16	HamKam (R)	30	1	4	25	22	78	−56	7	Relegation to Second Division

Source: nifs.no
Rules for classification: 1) points; 2) goal difference; 3) number of goals scored.
(C) Champions; (O) Play-off winners; (P) Promoted; (R) Relegated

== Results ==
Home \ Away	ALT	BRY	BÆR	FFK	HK	ILH	HØN	KBK	MIF	NS	RF	SF	SIF	TUIL	TIL	ULL
Alta	—	1–1	2–3	1–0	2–0	1–1	2–0	3–0	2–1	2–2	1–0	2–2	0–2	1–2	0–3	2–1
Bryne	6–1	—	1–2	1–2	1–0	2–2	3–2	1–3	0–5	3–1	1–2	1–3	1–4	2–0	2–1	2–1
Bærum	0–3	1–0	—	1–0	6–2	0–1	4–3	2–1	1–3	2–1	0–0	3–4	1–1	1–0	2–1	3–1
Fredrikstad	0–0	2–1	2–1	—	3–0	2–1	5–0	2–1	0–0	2–0	1–0	0–1	1–2	2–2	0–2	0–0
HamKam	2–4	0–2	3–0	1–3	—	0–1	1–4	0–0	1–2	1–1	1–3	2–3	1–1	0–4	1–4	0–1
Hødd	3–0	0–3	0–4	2–0	4–0	—	0–0	1–2	1–4	2–5	4–2	1–4	1–1	1–1	0–2	4–0
Hønefoss	1–0	1–2	2–1	0–1	2–0	1–4	—	1–0	1–1	0–1	2–1	2–3	3–2	4–0	1–3	1–0
Kristiansund	6–0	3–0	4–1	1–0	2–2	0–4	4–1	—	1–1	2–1	0–3	1–1	4–0	4–2	1–0	1–0
Mjøndalen	4–1	3–1	1–1	0–0	3–1	1–3	4–0	2–2	—	3–2	0–1	2–2	4–0	1–2	2–1	3–1
Nest-Sotra	2–1	2–3	1–2	2–1	3–1	0–1	0–1	1–1	1–2	—	2–2	0–4	2–0	4–0	2–1	1–1
Ranheim	2–0	1–1	5–0	4–1	2–0	1–0	4–1	1–1	1–1	1–2	—	1–1	2–4	1–0	0–3	0–2
Sandefjord	3–0	5–0	1–0	0–1	3–0	1–1	0–0	0–0	2–1	3–2	1–0	—	1–0	2–1	3–1	4–0
Strømmen	3–1	0–3	2–2	0–2	6–1	4–1	6–0	3–3	3–0	2–2	2–0	1–1	—	4–4	0–3	5–3
Tromsdalen	0–0	4–1	2–3	1–1	2–1	2–3	2–3	2–2	3–1	1–2	0–2	1–2	2–1	—	0–0	3–1
Tromsø	1–0	2–3	5–2	1–0	1–0	5–0	1–1	3–1	1–1	4–2	1–1	0–0	4–0	5–1	—	5–0
Ull/Kisa	0–0	1–0	0–2	0–1	5–0	1–1	0–1	1–2	0–1	2–2	1–2	0–2	1–0	1–0	1–3	—

Source: NIFS (in Norwegian)
Legend: Blue = home team win; Yellow = draw; Red = away team win.

== Top scorers ==
Rank	Player	Club	Goals	Games	Average
1	(Norway) Pål Alexander Kirkevold	Sandefjord	19	29	0.66
2	(Northern Ireland) Robin Shroot	Hødd	16	23	0.70
2	(Senegal) Jean Alassane Mendy	Kristiansund	16	28	0.57
2	(Denmark) Sanel Kapidzic	Mjøndalen	16	30	0.53
5	(Czech Republic) Zdeněk Ondrášek	Tromsø	15	25	0.60
5	(Norway) Kjell Rune Sellin	Sandefjord	15	29	0.52
7	(Norway) Vegard Lysvoll	Tromsdalen	14	28	0.50
8	(Finland) Roope Riski	Hønefoss	12	23	0.52
8	(Norway) Simen Næss	Nest-Sotra	12	29	0.41
8	(Norway) Steffen Lie Skålevik	Nest-Sotra	12	29	0.41
8	(Norway) Magnus Andersen	Tromsø	12	30	0.40
12	(Norway) Jonas Johansen	Tromsø	11	25	0.44
