= 2015 Norwegian First Division =

1. divisjon
- Season: 2015
- Dates: 6 April – 1 November
- Champions: Sogndal
- Promoted: Sogndal; Brann
- Relegated: Follo; Nest-Sotra; Bærum; Hønefoss
- Matches: 240
- Goals: 702 (2.93 per match)
- Top goalscorer: Pontus Engblom (17 goals); Robert Stene (17 goals)
- Biggest home win: Sandnes Ulf 6–1 Fredrikstad
- Biggest away win: Bærum 0–5 Sogndal
- Highest scoring: Sandnes Ulf 6–1 Fredrikstad; Bærum 5–2 Nest-Sotra
- Longest winning run: 7 games Sogndal
- Longest unbeaten run: 14 games Brann
- Highest attendance: 17,284; Brann 2–2 Nest-Sotra (16 May 2015)
- Average attendance: 1,998

The 2015 1. divisjon (referred to as the OBOS-ligaen for sponsorship reasons) was a Norwegian second-tier football league season. The league was contested by 16 teams, and the top two teams were promoted to Tippeligaen, while the teams placed from third to sixth place played a promotion-playoff against the 14th-placed team in Tippeligaen to win promotion. The bottom four teams were relegated to the 2. divisjon.

The first round of the season was played on 6 April 2015 and the season ended with the last round on 1 November 2015. The playoff-tournament was played between 7 and 21 November 2015.

An agreement with Oslo's housing cooperative OBOS was signed on 15 January 2015, branding the league as OBOS-ligaen until 2021.

== Team changes from 2014 ==
In the 2014 1. divisjon, Sandefjord, Tromsø and Mjøndalen won promotion to Tippeligaen, while Alta, HamKam, Tromsdalen and Ull/Kisa were relegated to the 2015 2. divisjon.

Sogndal, Sandnes Ulf and Brann, were relegated from the 2014 Tippeligaen, while Follo, Jerv, Levanger and Åsane were promoted from the 2014 2. divisjon.

== Teams ==
Locations of the teams in the 2015 1. divisjon

Team	Location	Arena	Capacity	Manager
Brann	Bergen	Brann Stadion	17,686	(Norway) Lars Arne Nilsen
Bryne	Bryne	Bryne Stadion	10,000	(Norway) Gaute Larsen
Bærum	Sandvika	Sandvika Stadion	1,815	(Norway) Roar Johansen
Follo	Ski	Ski Stadion	2,500	(Norway) Hans Erik Eriksen
Fredrikstad	Fredrikstad	Fredrikstad Stadion	12,565	(Norway) Håkon Wibe Lund
Hødd	Ulsteinvik	Høddvoll Stadion	3,825	(Norway) Sindre Eid
Hønefoss	Hønefoss	Aka Arena	4,120	(Norway) Rune Skarsfjord
Jerv	Grimstad	J.J. Ugland Stadion – Levermyr	1,700	(Norway) Steinar Pedersen
Kristiansund	Kristiansund	Kristiansund Stadion	3,000	(Norway) Christian Michelsen
Levanger	Levanger	Moan Fritidspark	6,000	(Sweden) Andreas Holmberg
Nest-Sotra	Sotra	Ågotnes Stadion	2,000	(Denmark) Michael Schjønberg
Ranheim	Trondheim	DNB Arena	2,000	(Norway) Ola By Rise
Sandnes Ulf	Sandnes	Sandnes Idrettspark	4,969	(Norway) Bengt Sæternes
Sogndal	Sogndalsfjøra	Fosshaugane Campus	5,539	(Norway) Eirik Bakke
Strømmen	Strømmen	Strømmen Stadion	1,800	(Norway) Gunnar Halle
Åsane	Åsane	Åsane Idrettspark	3,000	(Norway) Morten Røssland

=== Managerial changes ===
Team	Outgoing manager	Manner of departure	Date of vacancy	Table	Incoming manager	Date of appointment	Table
Bærum	(Norway) Morten Tandberg	Resigned	20 Nov 2014	Pre-season	(Norway) Roar Johansen	1 Jan 2015	Pre-season
Nest-Sotra	(Norway) Ruben Hetlevik	Stepped down to become assistant	26 Nov 2014	Pre-season	(Denmark) Michael Schjønberg	26 Nov 2014	Pre-season
Sandnes Ulf	(Norway) Tom Nordlie	Mutual consent	17 Nov 2014	Pre-season	(Norway) Bengt Sæternes	19 Nov 2014	Pre-season
Sogndal	(Sweden) Jonas Olsson	Mutual consent	1 Jan 2015	Pre-season	(Norway) Eirik Bakke	1 Jan 2015	Pre-season
Fredrikstad	(Norway) Håkon Wibe-Lund	Sacked	7 May 2015	13th	(Norway) Jan Tore Ophaug (Norway) Aleksander Olsen (interim)	7 May 2015	13th
Nest-Sotra	(Denmark) Michael Schjønberg	Sacked	13 May 2015	15th	(Norway) Ruben Hetlevik (Norway) Steffen Landro (interim)	13 May 2015	15th
Fredrikstad	(Norway) Jan Tore Ophaug (Norway) Aleksander Olsen (interim)	End of the interim	20 May 2015	14th	(Norway) Arne Erlandsen	20 May 2015	14th
Ranheim	(Norway) Trond Nordsteien	Sacked	27 May 2015	14th	(Norway) Svein Maalen	27 May 2015	14th
Brann	(Sweden) Rikard Norling	Sacked	27 May 2015	9th	(Norway) Lars Arne Nilsen	29 May 2015	9th
Ranheim	(Norway) Svein Maalen	End of the interim	8 June 2015	13th	(Norway) Ola By Rise	8 May 2015	13th
Nest-Sotra	(Norway) Ruben Hetlevik (Norway) Steffen Landro (interim)	End of the interim	16 July 2015	15th	(Norway) Petter Fossmark	16 July 2015	15th

== League table ==
Pos	Team	Pld	W	D	L	GF	GA	GD	Pts	Promotion, qualification or relegation
1	Sogndal (C, P)	30	18	8	4	59	31	+28	62	Promotion to Tippeligaen
2	Brann (P)	30	14	11	5	46	35	+11	53	Promotion to Tippeligaen
3	Kristiansund	30	14	7	9	37	30	+7	49	Qualification for the promotion play-offs
4	Hødd	30	14	6	10	43	40	+3	48	Qualification for the promotion play-offs
5	Jerv	30	12	11	7	47	28	+19	47	Qualification for the promotion play-offs
6	Ranheim	30	13	8	9	48	36	+12	47	Qualification for the promotion play-offs
7	Sandnes Ulf	30	13	8	9	49	40	+9	47	
8	Strømmen	30	10	7	13	33	39	−6	37	
9	Levanger	30	10	6	14	48	53	−5	36	
10	Bryne	30	10	6	14	43	50	−7	36	
11	Åsane	30	8	11	11	46	46	0	35	
12	Fredrikstad	30	8	11	11	41	61	−20	35	
13	Follo (R)	30	8	9	13	42	43	−1	33	Relegation to Second Division
14	Nest-Sotra (R)	30	8	7	15	41	51	−10	31	Relegation to Second Division
15	Bærum (R)	30	8	7	15	44	67	−23	31	Relegation to Second Division
16	Hønefoss (R)	30	7	7	16	35	52	−17	28	Relegation to Second Division

Source: nifs.no
Rules for classification: 1) points; 2) goal difference; 3) number of goals scored.
(C) Champions; (P) Promoted; (R) Relegated

== Results ==
Home \ Away	BRA	BRY	BÆR	FOL	FFK	HØD	HØN	JER	KBK	LEV	NS	RAN	ULF	SOG	STR	ÅSF
Brann	—	2–1	2–2	2–1	5–1	1–2	3–0	2–0	2–1	1–0	2–2	4–1	0–0	0–4	2–0	2–2
Bryne	0–1	—	2–1	2–0	2–3	1–4	3–2	1–2	2–0	4–1	2–1	2–2	2–1	0–2	0–0	0–0
Bærum	1–1	1–4	—	1–1	2–3	4–0	1–0	0–4	1–2	3–2	5–2	0–1	2–0	0–5	0–1	3–2
Follo	0–1	1–4	2–2	—	2–3	3–0	4–0	2–1	2–3	1–2	1–1	3–0	2–2	0–1	1–1	2–0
Fredrikstad	1–1	2–0	3–3	2–2	—	1–2	1–1	1–0	1–4	2–2	1–1	3–1	3–2	1–1	0–0	1–1
Hødd	3–0	2–0	4–2	2–1	1–1	—	0–1	0–0	0–1	0–4	3–2	1–1	1–3	1–0	1–1	4–0
Hønefoss	0–0	1–2	2–2	2–1	2–0	1–3	—	2–1	1–1	3–0	2–2	2–2	0–1	2–5	1–3	3–3
Jerv	2–2	3–0	5–0	2–2	4–0	0–1	2–1	—	0–1	4–2	3–0	2–0	0–0	0–0	0–0	1–1
Kristiansund	0–1	1–1	0–1	1–1	1–0	2–1	1–0	1–1	—	2–1	1–1	0–0	3–1	1–1	2–1	0–1
Levanger	4–1	1–0	4–1	3–1	4–1	0–0	0–1	1–4	0–2	—	0–3	1–1	0–0	4–1	0–1	2–2
Nest-Sotra	2–1	2–0	1–2	0–0	1–0	3–2	1–3	4–0	0–1	1–1	—	1–2	2–3	1–2	2–0	2–3
Ranheim	0–0	4–1	0–0	0–1	4–0	4–1	4–0	0–1	0–1	3–2	3–0	—	1–1	3–2	2–0	3–2
Sandnes Ulf	1–1	3–2	3–2	2–1	6–1	0–2	1–0	2–2	2–1	2–3	3–1	1–0	—	1–2	3–1	1–3
Sogndal	0–0	3–1	3–1	2–1	2–0	1–1	2–1	1–1	4–3	1–3	3–0	1–0	2–1	—	3–2	3–0
Strømmen	2–3	2–2	3–1	1–2	1–2	0–1	1–0	0–1	1–0	2–1	2–1	2–4	0–3	1–1	—	1–0
Åsane	2–3	2–2	5–0	0–1	3–3	2–0	2–1	1–1	2–0	5–0	0–1	1–2	0–0	1–1	0–3	—

Source: NIFS (in Norwegian)
Legend: Blue = home team win; Yellow = draw; Red = away team win.

== Season statistics ==
=== Top scorers ===
Rank	Player	Club	Goals	Games	Average
1	(Sweden) Pontus Engblom	Sandnes Ulf	17	26	0,65
1	(Norway) Robert Stene	Ranheim	17	29	0,59
3	(Norway) Kristian Fardal Opseth	Sogndal	16	26	0,62
4	(Norway) Ohi Omoijuanfo	Jerv	15	29	0,52
4	(Norway) Bendik Bye	Levanger	15	30	0,50
6	(Ghana) Mahatma Otoo	Sogndal	13	26	0,50
6	(Norway) Steffen Lie Skålevik	Brann	13	29	0,45
8	(Norway) Martin Ramsland	Strømmen	12	28	0,41
8	(Norway) Oddbjørn Skartun	Bryne	12	29	0,41
8	(Norway) Alexander Ruud Tveter	Follo	12	30	0,40
11	(Norway) Henrik Kjelsrud Johansen	Fredrikstad	11	19	0,58
11	(Norway) Eirik Ulland Andersen	Hødd	11	27	0,41
13	(Norway) Alexander Lind	Jerv	10	28	0,36

=== Hat tricks ===
Player	For	Against	Result	Date
(Sweden) Jakob Orlov	Brann	Ranheim	4–1	30 April 2015
(Norway) Ohi Omoijuanfo	Jerv	Levanger	4–2	31 May 2015
(Norway) Kristian Fardal Opseth	Sogndal	Brann	4–0	21 June 2015
(Norway) Robert Stene	Ranheim	Åsane	3–2	5 July 2015
(Norway) Geir André Herrem	Åsane	Bærum	5–0	20 September 2015
