= History of Hamarkameratene =

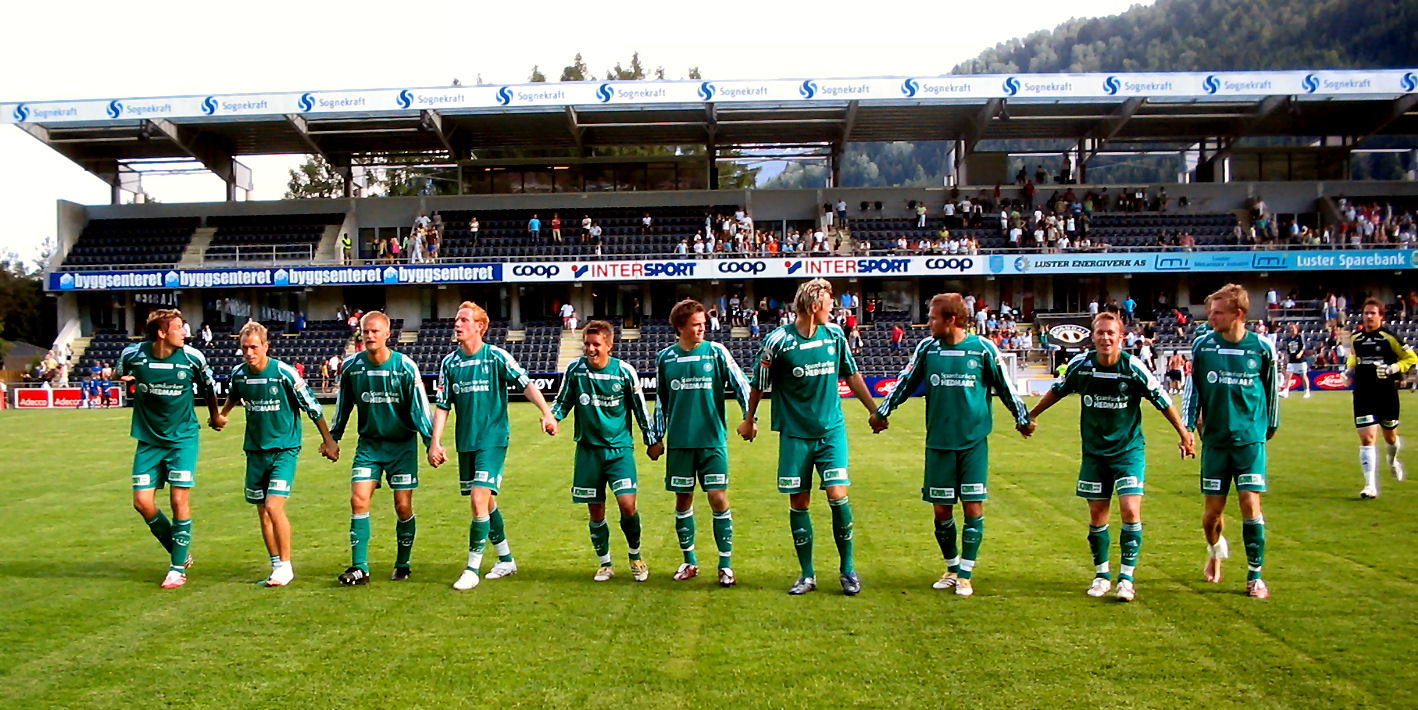
HamKam players celebrating after the victory over Sogndal at Fosshaugane Campus on 9 June 2007. From left: Markus Ringberg, Vegar Bjerke, Juha Pasoja, Espen Olsen, Truls Jevne Hagen, John Anders Rise, Roman Kienast, Thomas Øverby, Marius Gullerud, Jan Michaelsen og Svein Inge Haagenrud.

Hamarkameratene is a professional association football team from Hamar, Norway. It was established in 1946 as a merger between Briskebyen Fotballag (established in 1918 as Freidig) and Hamar Arbeideridrettslag. In 1970, the team qualified for the First Division, and has since been in the top three flights of Norwegian football. They play their home games at Briskeby Arena, built by the club between 1934 and 1936.

== Early years ==
=== Briskebyen Fotballag ===
Freidig was established on 10 August 1918 as a local team for Briskebyen in what was then Vang Municipality. The prerequisite for joining the team was being able to pay for the football. At the time there was a severe lack of pitches in Hamar, and the club would to begin with often sneak into unused venues and play until they were chased by the groundskeeper. Freidig applied for entry into the regional series in 1926, but were only admitted after their second attempt, in 1927. At the time a club by the name of "Freidig" was already playing in the series, so the boys from Hamar were forced to rename their team. The natural choice was Briskebyen Fotballag (Briskebyen Football Team), Briskeby being the name of their neighborhood.

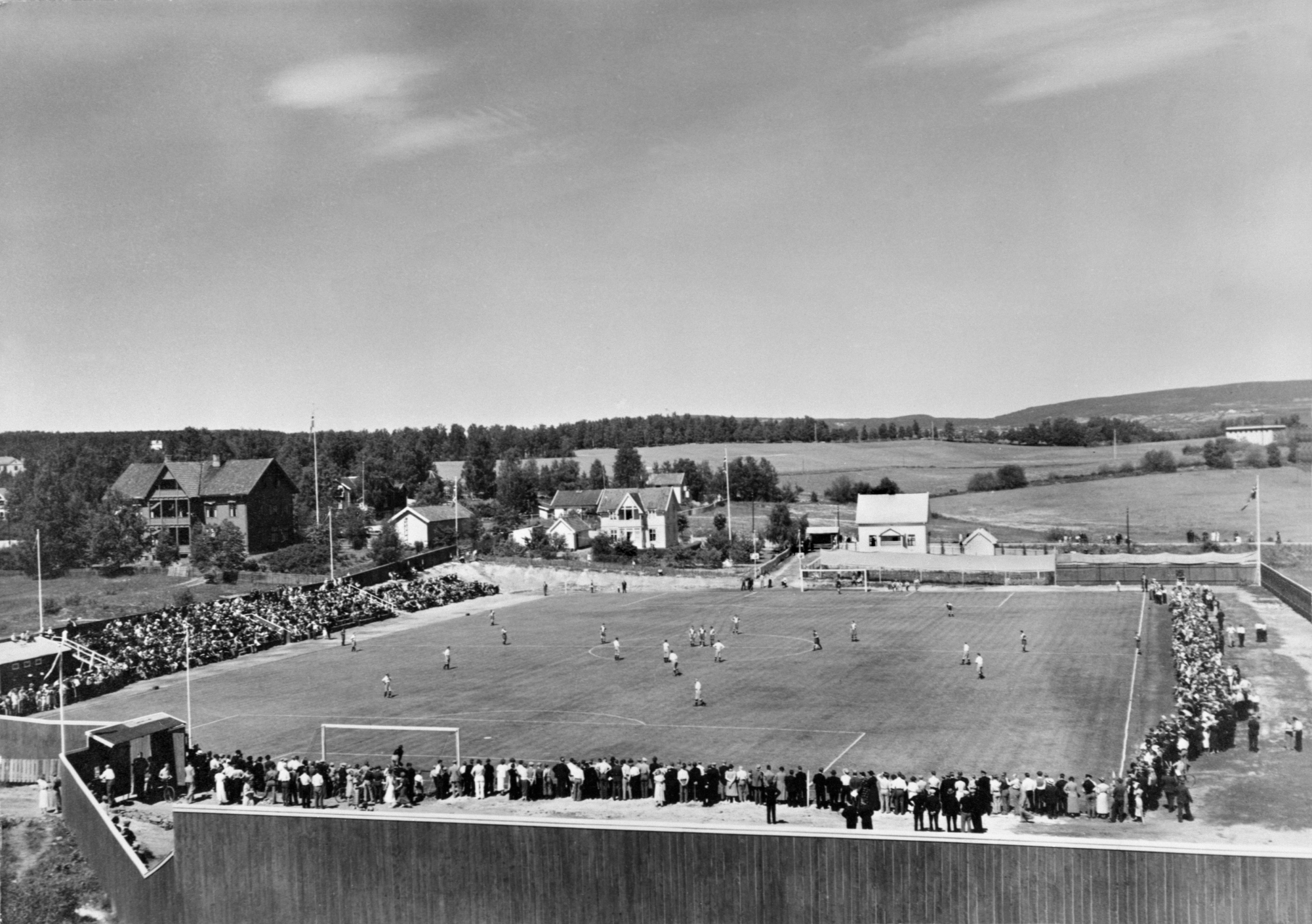
Briskeby during a match in the 1930s

This forced it to formalize its pitch renting to have a single home venue. In 1928 and 1929, it played at Vangsbanen, from 1930 through 1933 at Ottestad bane, and from 1934 at Hamar stadion. The club was dissatisfied with this arrangement and started working with plans to establish its own venue. The decision to build the venue was taken by Briskebyen FL's annual meeting on 15 April 1934, with construction starting on 26 April. The venue opened on 28 June 1936, having cost 32,036 Norwegian krone (NOK).

=== Merger ===
In 1946, Briskebyen Fotballag joined up with the multimodal sports club Hamar Arbeideridrettslag (Hamar Workers' Sports Club) to form Hamarkameratene (literally meaning "Comrades of Hamar"). Because of the general reconciliation between bourgeois and workers' sports clubs, it was the wish of the municipality that all the sports clubs in Hamar merge, but in the end only these two clubs, who shared a common political viewpoint, were able to reach an agreement. The first manager was Roy Wright, a former Wolverhampton player. His experience from English football, however, did not benefit the club and he was considered a disappointment. The Czechoslovak, Willem Cerveny, on the other hand, proved to be an influential asset to club and the development of a football culture in the region.

== Elite team ==
The first half of the 1970s was the club's most successful period to date. Having won promotion to the First Division for the first time in 1969 (the highest level in Norway at the time), the green and white placed third overall in their first season, as well as reaching the semifinals of the Norwegian Cup. HamKam remained a stable contender in the 1st Division until 1974, when they were relegated. The club would earn promotion to the highest division three more times before 1980.

The '80s continued in much the same fashion as the latter part of the '70s, with the club going back and forth between the two top levels in Norwegian football. In 1984, a new stand with a capacity of 2,346 was constructed at Briskeby. The new stand became a financial burden for the club. Operating costs increased after Norwegian clubs were allowed to wage players from 1984. In addition, interest rates rose quickly, making the club unable to meet its financial obligations. At the same time, the club experienced falling attendance. In 1985, the club's auditor warned that the club was heading into financial distress. In 1986, the club spent NOK 1 million to build terraces between the club house and the pitch on the northern short side, and terraces on the southern short side. In 1990, Hamar Municipality gave Ham-Kam a grant of NOK 1.7 million in an attempt to save the club's finances. A measure of success was still achieved, however, the club reaching the semifinals of the cup in 1987 and 1989.

A successful season in 1991 saw Hamarkameratene once again win promotion to the highest division (now called Tippeligaen/Norwegian Premier League), under Swedish coach Peter Engelbrektsson. The club managed to avoid relegation in 1992 by virtue of a better goal difference, and entered into 1993 with renewed confidence. After a slow start, the team began climbing towards the top, and were in reach of second place and even the championship towards the end of the season, but with a slump in form a fifth place was the still-positive end result.

On 20 October 1993, the municipal council voted in favor of purchasing the stadium. The proposal was supported by the Labour Party and Centre Party, who had 28 of 49 councilors, but opposed by the rest of the council.

HamKam spent another two years in the Premier League before entering a recession. In 1994, the municipality bought the stadium to remove the debt which had nearly bankrupted the club. Coach Engelbrektsson left after relegation to the 1st Division in 1995, and the club failed to earn promotion in 1996 and 1997. Serious financial problems emerged at the beginning of 1998. This time a group of private investors prevented bankruptcy, but HamKam were unable to even retain their spot in the 1st Division and were relegated to the 2nd Division. Promotion back into the 1st Division was won the following season, and a slow process followed to rebuild the team. In 2001 the club nearly made it back to the Premier League but lost the playoff against Bryne. The following season was a disappointment, however, with only eighth place to show for, and the club was yet again experiencing financial problems.

== New stadium and collapse ==
After struggling for seven years, the hiring of Ståle Solbakken as the team's coach before the start of the 2003-season marked the beginning of another short stay at the top of Norwegian football for the green and white. Having won the 1st Division in 2003, they entered the Premier League for the first time since 1995. The first season in the top flight in eight years was a formidable success. Under Solbakken's leadership, HamKam were in contention for a spot among the final four and a place in the UEFA Cup qualifying rounds. They would eventually end the season in fifth place. Thought by many to be unable to cope in the company of wealthier clubs, this was an impressive feat by the team with the second-smallest budget of them all.

Expectations were high in 2005, but despite early prospects of a good season (in their first game, they defeated would-be champions Vålerenga), HamKam were unable to perform consistently and ended up in a disappointing tenth place. Soon after, Solbakken announced that he would be leaving the club to become manager of FC Copenhagen. His was succeeded by the former Norwegian national goalkeeper Frode Grodås.

Solbakken's tenure at Hamarkameratene had left the club in a much improved state from prior to his arrival. Gone were the financial problems that had plagued the club for two decades. People were once again coming to see the team play, with attendances now averaging more than 5,500, a number not seen since the '70s. Fans of the club had even gone as far as to nickname their manager Ståle "Salvatore" ("the saviour") in recognition of his achievements.

His successor failed to capitalize. HamKam picked up where they left off in 2005, scoring some spectacular wins against top teams while again being unable to perform consistently. As the season neared its end, however, Frode Grodås failed where Solbakken had succeeded, namely in keeping HamKam away from the relegation zone. Going into the final round of the season, they found themselves third from the bottom of the table and in need of a win. HamKam instead suffered a humiliating 1–5 loss at home, dropping to 13th place and relegation in 2006.

As a result of this, the board decided to fire Grodås from his position as head coach, and on 13 November Arne Erlandsen was hired as his replacement. Vegard Skogheim, a long-time favourite amongst the fans, was hired as assistant coach. HamKam returned to Premier Division in 2007 but relegated again to First Division as 14th or last in 2008. HamKam slipped down to Second Division as 13th after losing 1–0 away match against Sparta Sarpsborg in 2009.

By 2001 NFF was in the process of implementing new stadium requirements in the top leagues, and Briskeby would no longer be permitted to be used in the top tier. In 2004, Biong Arkitekter was contracted to design the stadium, with Byggeråd as structural engineers. Hamar stadion and the neighbor lot Fuglsetmyra was sold for NOK 295 million in June 2007. These municipal lots were sold allowing the profits to be used to build new stands at Briskeby. The first stage of the stadium opened on 10 August 2008, after which further construction was terminated. Stage one cost NOK 92.5 million to build and NOK 19 million for purchase of real estate. In the 2010 season, Ham-Kam played in the Second Division, resulting in the entire VIP area remaining unused.

In the 2010 season, HamKam won its section of the Second Division and won promotion back to the second tier. However, economic problems came to a head, and on 21 December 2010, the board announced that the club had decided to file for bankruptcy on 30 December, unless fresh funds were raised by that time. Artificial turf was laid on the stadium in August 2011. That season saw the team focus on using local talent. After a strong spring the team fell behind during the fall and failed short of a promotion, finishing sixth. The 2012 season saw the team beat Tromsdalen 7–2. However, financial irregularities caused the team to be penalized two points, which caused them to fall one point short of a promotion qualification place, ending in eighth place.

HamKam finished third in the First Division in 2013. They progressed to the promotion play-offs, where they lost 2–0 to Ranheim. The season's record attendance of 5,000 the past five years was drawn from a derby against Elverum. The team experienced a spiral of problems through 2014. Skogheim withdrew after three games, and was replaced by Peter Sørensen. The year's first victor came on 25 May. Sponsor and ticket revenue dwindled and to save the club from bankruptcy all administrative personnel were laid off and the players' wage halved. Chris Twiddy took over as coach and the season ended with only seven points. New coach ahead of the 2015 season in the Second Division was Kent Bergersen.

== Bibliography ==
- Gjerdåker, Brynjulv (1998). Stiftstad og bygdeby. Hamars historie 1935–1991 (in Norwegian). Hamar: Hamar Municipality. pp. 102–106. ISBN 8299490618.
- "Briskebyrapporten" (PDF) (in Norwegian). Lynx Avokatfirma. 17 August 2011. Archived (PDF) from the original on 13 June 2012.
