= Terje Dokken =

Norwegian football manager

Personal information
- Date of birth: 13 December 1948 (age 77)
- Place of birth: Drammen, Norway
- Position: [[Defender (association football)]Defender]]

Youth career
- 1959–1967: Åssiden

Senior career*
Years	Team	Apps	(Gls)
1968–1976	Åssiden		
1977–1978	Mjøndalen		

Managerial career
- 1977–1979: Mjøndalen (U19)
- 1980–1982: Strømsgodset
- 1983: Åssiden
- 1984–1986: Asker SK
- 1987–1988: Strømsgodset
- 1989–1996: Strømsgodset (director of sports)
- * Club domestic league appearances and goals

Terje Dokken (born 13 December 1948) is a Norwegian football player and manager.

Dokken is an older brother of Arne Dokken, and through him an uncle of Kenneth Dokken. Terje Dokken started playing football in local Northern Drammen club Åssiden IF in 1959, and remained here throughout 1976. In 1977 and 1978 he played for Mjøndalen IF, both on the highest Norwegian tier, amateur at the time, and in Europe. Among others, Dokken remembered losing duels to Gerd Müller.

Terje Dokken was also a bandy goalkeeper, and became Norwegian champion in bandy in 1970 when his team Strømsgodset beat Stabæk in the championship final. His time at Strømsgodset lasted from 1969 to 1974.

Terje Dokken started his coaching career in Mjøndalen, part-timing for their U19 team. Through the 1980s he coached Strømsgodset IF from 1980 to 1982, Åssiden IF in 1983, Asker SK from 1984 to 1986 and Strømsgodset again from 1987 to 1988.

Dokken started a lengthy spell as Strømsgodset's director of sports from 1989. He was in charge of signing players and managers, from 1992 to 1994 as chairman of Strømsgodset's football division, before returning as director of sports. Strømsgodset won one title during his period, the 1991 Norwegian Football Cup. In the league, Strømsgodset was more unstable, with relegations from the highest tier in 1991 and 1994 and re-promotions in 1993 and 1995. Dokken resigned as Strømsgodset director in January 1996, citing that the "Dokken era in SIF now must come to an end".

In 1997 Terje Dokken was elected deputy leader of Buskerud District of the Football Association, with Arne Dokken as leader. The Football Association did not accept that Arne Dokken held this position concurrently with working as a football agent in transfers involving Panathinaikos. Arne Dokken resigned, and Terje Dokken automatically advanced to leader. As such he oversaw development of football on all levels in Buskerud. He did not stand for re-election in 2003, and was decorated with Buskerud District honorary badge.
