= 2011 in Norwegian football =

Football in Norway
- Season: 2011

Men's football
- Tippeligaen: Molde
- 1. divisjon: Hønefoss
- 2. divisjon: Ullensaker/Kisa (Group 1); Bærum (Group 2); Notodden (Group 3); Tromsdalen (Group 4)
- Cupen: Aalesund

Women's football
- Toppserien: Røa
- 1. divisjon: Vålerenga
- Cupen: Stabæk

The 2011 season was the 106th season of competitive football in Norway.

The season began on 18 March 2011 for Tippeligaen, 3 April 2011 for Adeccoligaen, with 2. divisjon and 3. divisjon both starting six days later on 9 April 2011. 2. divisjon and 3. divisjon ended on 22 October 2011 while Adeccoligaen ended eight days later on 30 October 2011 and Tippeligaen finished on 27 November 2011.

== Events of the season ==
=== January ===
8 January 2011: Thorbjørn Svenssen, Norway's most capped player with 104 games, dies from a stroke at the age of 86.

=== August ===
13 August 2011: Start beat Adeccoliga side Alta 1–0 and through to the semi-final of 2011 Norwegian Football Cup. 2009 winners Aalesund is heading for another Cup-victory after beating Rosenborg at home.

14 August 2011: Fredrikstad FK denies Ole Gunnar Solskjær success in the Norwegian Football Cup in his first year as a manager in Norway. Molde lost 2–3 at Fredrikstad Stadion after extra time. In Stavanger, Brann knocked out Viking on penalties shoot-out, with Piotr Leciejewski saving three of Vikings four penalties.

=== September ===
2 September 2011: With a late penalty goal from Mohammed Abdellaoue, Norway won 1–0 against Iceland, keeping Norway joint top of UEFA EURO 2012 qualifying Group H with two matches remaining.

6 September 2011: Denmark won 2–0 against Norway in Parken, after two goals from Nicklas Bendtner. The chances for Drillo's men to reach UEFA EURO 2012 is now very small.

10 September 2011: Notodden secured promotion to 1. divisjon with six matches left to play, after beating Førde 2–1 in Førde.

21 September 2011: Brann reach the Cup final after a 2–0 win against Fredrikstad at Fredrikstad Stadion.

21 September 2011: With an unlucky own goal, Haraldur Freyr Guðmundsson sent his old team, Aalesund to the Cup final, two years after they won the Cup in 2009, after beating Start in the other semifinal.

=== October ===
2 October 2011: Molde move closer to the Tippeliga title with a 2–0 win against title challengers Tromsø, and becomes the first team this season to win at Alfheim Stadion this season.

19 October 2011: Hønefoss took another step towards promotion to 2012 Tippeligaen with a 2–1 win against Asker in 1. divisjon, while Tom Nordlie and Kongsvinger ruined Sandefjord's chances for promotion.

== Men's football ==
=== Promotion and relegation ===
League	Promoted to league	Relegated from league
Tippeligaen	Sogndal; Sarpsborg 08; Fredrikstad	Hønefoss; Kongsvinger; Sandefjord
1. divisjon	Asker; HamKam; Hødd; Randaberg	Follo; Tromsdalen; Moss; Lyn
2. divisjon	Kvik Halden; Nesodden; Tiller; Elverum; Herd; Jevnaker; Austevoll; Mandalskameratene; Viking 2; Hasle-Løren; Mjølner; Skarp	Os; Stord; Fana; Skarbøvik; Oslo City; Kolstad; Start 2; Kopervik; Stavanger; Eidsvold Turn; Mo

=== League season ===
==== Tippeligaen ====
Pos	Team	Pld	W	D	L	GF	GA	GD	Pts	Qualification or relegation
1	Molde (C)	30	17	7	6	54	38	+16	58	Qualification for the Champions League second qualifying round
2	Tromsø	30	15	8	7	56	34	+22	53	Qualification for the Europa League second qualifying round
3	Rosenborg	30	14	7	9	69	44	+25	49	Qualification for the Europa League first qualifying round
4	Brann	30	14	6	10	51	49	+2	48	
5	Odd Grenland	30	14	6	10	44	44	0	48	
6	Haugesund	30	14	5	11	55	43	+12	47	
7	Vålerenga	30	14	5	11	42	33	+9	47	
8	Strømsgodset	30	12	9	9	44	43	+1	45	
9	Aalesund	30	12	7	11	36	38	−2	43	Qualification for the Europa League second qualifying round (Note: Aalesund qualified for the second qualifying round of the UEFA Europa League as winners of the 2011 Norwegian Cup.)
10	Stabæk	30	11	6	13	44	50	−6	39	Qualification for the Europa League first qualifying round (Note: Stabæk qualified for the first qualifying round of the UEFA Europa League via the UEFA Fair Play ranking.)
11	Viking	30	9	10	11	33	40	−7	37	
12	Fredrikstad	30	10	6	14	38	41	−3	36	
13	Lillestrøm	30	9	7	14	46	52	−6	34	
14	Sogndal	30	8	10	12	24	31	−7	34	
15	Start (R)	30	7	5	18	39	61	−22	26	Relegation to First Division
16	Sarpsborg 08 (R)	30	5	6	19	31	65	−34	21	Relegation to First Division

Source: fotball.no
Rules for classification: 1) points; 2) goal difference; 3) number of goals scored.
(C) Champions; (R) Relegated

==== 1. divisjon (Adeccoligaen) ====
Pos	Team	Pld	W	D	L	GF	GA	GD	Pts	Promotion or relegation
1	Hønefoss (C, P)	30	16	9	5	61	28	+33	57	Promotion to Tippeligaen
2	Sandnes Ulf (P)	30	18	2	10	58	32	+26	56	Promotion to Tippeligaen
3	Sandefjord	30	16	5	9	61	38	+23	53	
4	Ranheim	30	15	7	8	61	39	+22	52	
5	Bodø/Glimt	30	15	7	8	52	38	+14	52	
6	HamKam	30	14	9	7	52	40	+12	51	
7	Kongsvinger	30	14	7	9	50	36	+14	49	
8	Hødd	30	13	7	10	54	42	+12	46	
9	Bryne	30	11	11	8	47	36	+11	44	
10	Mjøndalen	30	10	10	10	42	51	−9	40	
11	Alta	30	10	9	11	45	51	−6	39	
12	Strømmen	30	9	7	14	43	58	−15	34	
13	Asker (R)	30	9	7	14	38	56	−18	34	Relegation to Second Division
14	Nybergsund (R)	30	6	5	19	42	72	−30	23	Relegation to Second Division
15	Randaberg (R)	30	4	5	21	37	87	−50	17	Relegation to Second Division
16	Løv-Ham (Note: Løv-Ham were deducted a total 1 points: 1 point because of lack of financial control) (R)	30	4	5	21	32	71	−39	16	Relegation to Second Division

Source: nifs.no
Rules for classification: 1) points; 2) goal difference; 3) number of goals scored.
(C) Champions; (P) Promoted; (R) Relegated

==== 2. divisjon (Fair Play-ligaen) ====
===== Group 1 =====
Pos	Team	Pld	W	D	L	GF	GA	GD	Pts	Promotion or relegation
1	Ull/Kisa (P)	26	14	9	3	59	38	+21	51	Promotion to First Division
2	Rosenborg 2	26	14	4	8	76	56	+20	46	
3	Byåsen	26	12	8	6	65	48	+17	44	
4	Lørenskog	26	12	7	7	55	46	+9	43	
5	Kvik Halden	26	12	6	8	52	34	+18	42	
6	Nesodden	26	13	2	11	53	44	+9	41	
7	Levanger	26	12	3	11	52	45	+7	39	
8	Stabæk 2	26	11	6	9	47	46	+1	39	
9	KFUM Oslo	26	10	8	8	55	38	+17	38	
10	Moss	26	11	5	10	58	56	+2	38	
11	Nardo	26	8	5	13	43	55	−12	29	
12	Tiller (R)	26	8	3	15	41	58	−17	27	Relegation to Third Division
13	Strindheim (R)	26	5	6	15	39	68	−29	21	Relegation to Third Division
14	Steinkjer (R)	26	3	2	21	43	106	−63	11	Relegation to Third Division

Source: nifs.no
Rules for classification: 1) points; 2) goal difference; 3) number of goals scored.
(P) Promoted; (R) Relegated

===== Group 2 =====
Pos	Team	Pld	W	D	L	GF	GA	GD	Pts	Promotion or relegation
1	Bærum (P)	24	15	6	3	75	30	+45	51	Promotion to First Division
2	Kristiansund BK	24	15	3	6	55	29	+26	48	
3	Raufoss	24	13	3	8	57	41	+16	42	
4	Elverum	24	12	6	6	38	26	+12	42	
5	Brumunddal	24	12	2	10	54	43	+11	38	
6	Frigg	24	11	4	9	47	40	+7	37	
7	Valdres	24	10	3	11	42	49	−7	33	
8	Molde 2 (Note: Molde 2 were deducted 1 point for using an illegal player in the match against Valdres on 23 June 2011.)	24	9	4	11	43	53	−10	30	
9	Lillehammer	24	8	5	11	39	56	−17	29	
10	Follo	24	7	5	12	47	51	−4	26	
11	Aalesund 2	24	7	5	12	36	59	−23	26	
12	Jevnaker (R)	24	7	1	16	42	64	−22	22	Relegation to Third Division
13	Herd (R)	24	4	5	15	32	66	−34	17	Relegation to Third Division
14	Manglerud Star (Note: Manglerud Star were bankrupted 4 April 2011, and will not play any matches.) (R)	0	0	0	0	0	0	0	0	Relegation to Third Division

Source: nifs.no
Rules for classification: 1) points; 2) goal difference; 3) number of goals scored.
(P) Promoted; (R) Relegated

===== Group 3 =====
Pos	Team	Pld	W	D	L	GF	GA	GD	Pts	Promotion or relegation
1	Notodden (P)	26	22	2	2	79	23	+56	68	Promotion to First Division
2	Vard Haugesund	26	13	5	8	57	35	+22	44	
3	Vindbjart	26	12	5	9	51	54	−3	41	
4	Åsane	26	11	7	8	51	42	+9	40	
5	Vidar	26	11	4	11	40	48	−8	37	
6	Odd Grenland 2	26	10	6	10	36	37	−1	36	
7	Flekkerøy	26	10	5	11	36	38	−2	35	
8	Ålgård	26	8	10	8	45	43	+2	34	
9	Nest-Sotra	26	9	6	11	51	45	+6	33	
10	Mandalskameratene	26	8	7	11	45	59	−14	31	
11	Pors Grenland	26	8	5	13	42	53	−11	29	
12	Viking 2 (R)	26	7	8	11	36	55	−19	29	Relegation to Third Division
13	Førde (R)	26	7	5	14	43	50	−7	26	Relegation to Third Division
14	Austevoll (R)	26	7	3	16	49	79	−30	24	Relegation to Third Division

Source: nifs.no
Rules for classification: 1) points; 2) goal difference; 3) number of goals scored.
(P) Promoted; (R) Relegated

===== Group 4 =====
Pos	Team	Pld	W	D	L	GF	GA	GD	Pts	Promotion or relegation
1	Tromsdalen (P)	26	20	2	4	105	28	+77	62	Promotion to First Division
2	Skeid	26	16	4	6	75	38	+37	52	
3	Strømsgodset 2	26	15	3	8	88	65	+23	48	
4	Ørn-Horten	26	15	3	8	50	38	+12	48	
5	Senja	26	14	2	10	57	66	−9	44	
6	FK Tønsberg	26	13	3	10	48	50	−2	42	
7	Kjelsås	26	11	7	8	61	42	+19	40	
8	Mjølner	26	12	4	10	39	32	+7	40	
9	Tromsø 2	26	10	5	11	37	51	−14	35	
10	Vålerenga 2	26	7	6	13	58	65	−7	27	
11	Fram Larvik	26	7	6	13	34	56	−22	27	
12	Harstad (R)	26	7	4	15	41	58	−17	25	Relegation to Third Division
13	Hasle-Løren (R)	26	2	8	16	39	87	−48	14	Relegation to Third Division
14	Skarp (R)	26	2	5	19	29	85	−56	11	Relegation to Third Division

Source: nifs.no
Rules for classification: 1) points; 2) goal difference; 3) number of goals scored.
(P) Promoted; (R) Relegated

=== Norwegian Cup ===
Quarter-finals
14 August – Fredrikstad Stadion, Fredrikstad
Fredrikstad (AET)	2 (3)
Molde	2 (2)
14 August – Viking Stadion, Stavanger
Viking	1 (1)
Brann (pen.)	1 (3)
13 August – Color Line Stadion, Ålesund
Aalesund	3
Rosenborg	1
13 August – Sør Arena, Kristiansand
Start	1
Alta	0

Semi-finals
21 September – Fredrikstad Stadion, Fredrikstad
Fredrikstad	0
Brann	2
22 September – Color Line Stadion, Ålesund
Aalesund	1
Start	0

Final
6 November – Ullevaal Stadium, Oslo
Brann	1
Aalesund	2

==== Final ====
6 November 2011
13:15 CET (UTC+1)

Brann	1–2	Aalesund
Korcsmár 21'	Report	Barrantes 19', 38'

Ullevaal Stadion, Oslo
Attendance: 25,032
Referee: Svein-Erik Edvartsen (Hamar IL)

== Women's football ==
=== League season ===
==== Toppserien ====
Pos	Team	Pld	W	D	L	GF	GA	GD	Pts	Qualification or relegation
1	Røa (C)	22	18	0	4	76	18	+58	54	Qualification for the Champions League round of 32
2	Stabæk	22	16	3	3	57	10	+47	51	Qualification for the Champions League round of 32
3	Kolbotn	22	16	3	3	59	26	+33	51	
4	Arna-Bjørnar	22	16	1	5	64	19	+45	49	
5	LSK Kvinner	22	13	1	8	47	42	+5	40	
6	Trondheims-Ørn	22	11	2	9	45	41	+4	35	
7	Amazon Grimstad	22	8	3	11	33	42	−9	27	
8	Klepp	22	6	5	11	28	37	−9	23	
9	Kattem	22	5	4	13	36	60	−24	19	
10	Sandviken	22	5	4	13	24	51	−27	19	
11	Medkila (R)	22	3	3	16	20	63	−43	12	Relegation to First Division
12	Linderud-Grei (R)	22	0	1	21	16	96	−80	1	Relegation to First Division

Source: NRK Sport
Rules for classification: 1) points; 2) goal difference; 3) number of goals scored.
(C) Champions; (R) Relegated

=== Norwegian Women's Cup ===
==== Final ====
- Røa 2–2 (aet) (6–7 on penalties) Stabæk

== Men's UEFA competitions ==
These are the results of the Norwegian teams in European competitions during the 2011 season. (Norwegian team score displayed first)

Team	Contest and round	Opponent	1st leg score*	2nd leg score**	Aggregate score
Rosenborg	Champions League 2nd Qual. Round	(Iceland) Breiðablik	4–0 (H)	0–2 (A)	W 4–2
Rosenborg	Champions League 3rd Qual. Round	(Czech Republic) Viktoria Plzeň	0–1 (H)	2–3 (A)	L 2–4
Rosenborg	Europa League Play Off Round	(Cyprus) AEK Larnaca	0–0 (H)	1–2 (A)	L 1–2
Strømsgodset	Europa League 3rd Qual. Round	(Spain) Atlético Madrid	1–2 (A)	0–2 (H)	L 1–4
Vålerenga	Europa League 2nd Qual. Round	(Armenia) Mika	1–0 (H)	1–0 (A)	W 2–0
Vålerenga	Europa League 3rd Qual. Round	(Greece) PAOK	0–2 (H)	0–3 (A)	L 0–5
Tromsø	Europa League 1st Qual. Round	(Latvia) Daugava Daugavpils	5–0 (A)	2–1 (H)	W 7–1
Tromsø	Europa League 2nd Qual. Round	(Hungary) Paks	1–1 (A)	0–3 (H)	L 1–4
Aalesund	Europa League 1st Qual. Round	(Wales) Neath	4–1 (H)	2–0 (A)	W 6–1
Aalesund	Europa League 2nd Qual. Round	(Hungary) Ferencváros	1–2 (A)	3–1 (aet) (H)	W 4–3
Aalesund	Europa League 3rd Qual. Round	(Sweden) Elfsborg	4–0 (H)	1–1 (A)	W 5–1
Aalesund	Europa League Play Off Round	(Netherlands) AZ Alkmaar	2–1 (H)	0–6 (A)	L 2–7

* For group games in Champions League or Europa League, score in home game is displayed
** For group games in Champions League or Europa League, score in away game is displayed

== UEFA Women's Champions League ==
=== Knockout stage ===
==== Round of 32 ====
Team 1	Agg.	Team 2	1st leg	2nd leg
Stabæk (Norway)	2–4	(Germany) 1. FFC Frankfurt	1–0	1–4

== National teams ==
=== Norway men's national football team ===
==== UEFA Euro 2012 qualifying ====
===== Group H =====
Pos	Team	Pld	W	D	L	GF	GA	GD	Pts	Qualification	(Denmark)	(Portugal)	(Norway)	(Iceland)	(Cyprus)
1	Denmark	8	6	1	1	15	6	+9	19	Qualify for final tournament	—	2–1	2–0	1–0	2–0
2	Portugal	8	5	1	2	21	12	+9	16 (Note: Tied on head-to-head results. Overall goal difference was used as the tiebreaker.)	Advance to play-offs	3–1	—	1–0	5–3	4–4
3	Norway	8	5	1	2	10	7	+3	16		1–1	1–0	—	1–0	3–1
4	Iceland	8	1	1	6	6	14	−8	4		0–2	1–3	1–2	—	1–0
5	Cyprus	8	0	2	6	7	20	−13	2		1–4	0–4	1–2	0–0	—

Source: UEFA
Rules for classification: Qualification tiebreakers
Notes:

During this season, the Norway national football team were to play the last five of their eight scheduled Group H qualifying matches for Euro 2012.

26 March 2011	Norway	1–1	Denmark	Ullevaal Stadion, Oslo
20:00 CET	Huseklepp 81'	Report	Rommedahl 27'	Attendance: 24,828; Referee: Gianluca Rocchi (Italy)

4 June 2011	Portugal	1–0	Norway	Estádio da Luz, Lisbon
22:00 CEST	Postiga 53'	Report		Attendance: 47,829; Referee: Cüneyt Çakır (Turkey)

2 September 2011	Norway	1–0	Iceland	Ullevaal Stadion, Oslo
20:00 CEST	Abdellaoue 88' (pen.)	Report		Attendance: 22,381; Referee: Ovidiu Alin Hategan, (Romania)

6 September 2011	Denmark	2–0	Norway	Parken Stadium, Copenhagen
20:15 CEST	Bendtner 24', 44'	Report		Attendance: 37,167; Referee: Stéphane Lannoy (France)

11 October 2011	Norway	3–1	Cyprus	Ullevaal Stadion, Oslo
20:15 CEST	Pedersen 25'; Carew 34'; Høgli 65'	Report	Okkas 42'	Attendance: 13,490; Referee: William Collum (Scotland)

==== Friendlies ====
The Norway national football team also participated in four friendly matches in 2011.

9 February 2011	Norway	0–1	Poland	Estádio Algarve, Faro
19:30 CET		Report	Lewandowski 19'	Attendance: 500; Referee: Ivo Santos, Portugal

7 June 2011	Norway	1–0	Lithuania	Ullevaal Stadion, Oslo
19:00 CEST	Gamst Pedersen 83'	Report		Attendance: 12,945; Referee: Stuart Attwell, England

10 August 2011	Norway	3–0	Czech Republic	Ullevaal Stadion, Oslo
20:00 CEST	Abdellaoue 23', 89' (pen.); J. A. Riise 72'	Report		Attendance: 12,734; Referee: Alan Black, Northern Ireland

12 November 2011	Wales	4–1	Norway	Cardiff City Stadium, Cardiff
16:00 CET	Bale 10'; Bellamy 15'; Vokes 87', 89'		Huseklepp 60'	Attendance: 12,600; Referee: Gerhard Grobelnik, Austria

== Managerial changes ==
Name	Club	Date of departure	Replacement	Date of appointment
(Norway) Nils Arne Eggen	Rosenborg	31 December 2010	(Sweden) Jan Jönsson	1 January 2011
(Sweden) Jan Jönsson	Stabæk	31 December 2010	(Sweden) Jörgen Lennartsson	1 January 2011
(Germany) Uwe Rösler	Molde	31 December 2010	(Norway) Ole Gunnar Solskjær	1 January 2011
(Norway) Tor Thodesen	Tønsberg	31 December 2010	(Norway) Hein Henriksen	1 January 2011
Unknown	Moss	31 December 2010	(Norway) Tor Thodesen	1 January 2011
(Republic of Ireland) Patrick Walker	Sandefjord	9 May 2011	(Norway) Arne Sandstø	23 May 2011
(Norway) Arne Sandstø	Løv-Ham	23 May 2011	(Norway) Tom Mangersnes	24 May 2011
(Norway) Kåre Ingebrigtsen	Bodø/Glimt	26 May 2011	(Norway) Cato André Hansen	24 June 2011
(Norway) Knut Tørum	Start	22 June 2011	(Norway) Mons Ivar Mjelde	12 July 2011
(Norway) Per Brogeland	Kongsvinger	30 August 2011	(Norway) Tom Nordlie	1 September 2011
