= 2011 Norwegian First Division =

1. divisjon
- Season: 2011
- Dates: 3 April – 30 October
- Champions: Hønefoss
- Promoted: Hønefoss; Sandnes Ulf
- Relegated: Asker; Nybergsund; Randaberg; Løv-Ham
- Matches played: 240
- Goals scored: 775 (3.23 per match)
- Top goalscorer: Vegard Braaten (18 goals)

Locations of the 2011 1. divisjon clubs

The 2011 1. division (referred to as Adeccoligaen for sponsorship reasons) was a Norwegian second-tier football season. The season began play on 3 April 2011 and ended on 30 October 2011.

The clubs relegated from the 2010 Tippeligaen were Hønefoss (after relegation play-offs), Kongsvinger and Sandefjord. Asker, HamKam, Hødd, and Randaberg were promoted from the 2010 2. divisjon.

Following an extended period of financial distress, Lyn withdrew from the league in 2010. Follo did not finish their licensing application for the 2011 season before the time limit of 15 September 2010, and were thus relegated at the end of the 2010 season even though they finished 12th, outside of the relegation zone. As a result of this the 13th-placed team, Sandnes Ulf, avoided relegation. Tromsdalen and Moss were the remaining two teams relegated to the 2011 2. divisjon.

At the end of the season, the two best teams were promoted to the 2012 Tippeligaen, while the four bottom placed teams were relegated to the 2012 2. divisjon. There was not a two-legged promotion play-off this season.

== Overview ==
| Team | Location | Arena | Capacity | Manager |
|---|---|---|---|---|
| Alta | Alta | Finnmarkshallen | 1,000 | (Norway) Rune Berger |
| Asker Fotball | Asker | Føyka Stadion | 2,000 | (Norway) Gaute Larsen |
| Bodø/Glimt | Bodø | Aspmyra Stadion | 7,400 | (Norway) Cato André Hansen |
| Bryne | Bryne | Bryne Stadion | 10,000 | (Norway) Tommy Bergersen |
| HamKam | Hamar | Briskeby Arena | 10,200 | (Norway) Vegard Skogheim |
| Hødd | Ulsteinvik | Høddvoll Stadion | 3,120 | (Norway) Lars Arne Nilsen |
| Hønefoss | Hønefoss | AKA Arena | 4,000 | (Norway) Leif Gunnar Smerud |
| Kongsvinger | Kongsvinger | Gjemselund Stadion | 5,202 | (Norway) Tom Nordlie |
| Løv-Ham | Bergen | Varden Amfi | 3,500 | (Norway) Tom Mangersnes |
| Mjøndalen | Mjøndalen | Nedre Eiker Stadion | 2,600 | (Norway) Vegard Hansen |
| Nybergsund | Trysil | Nybergsund Stadion | 1,600 | (Norway) Ola Brenden |
| Randaberg | Randaberg | Randaberg Stadion | 1,033 | (Norway) Thomas Pereira |
| Ranheim | Ranheim | DnB NOR Arena | 2,000 | (Norway) Aasmund Bjørkan |
| Sandefjord | Sandefjord | Komplett.no Arena | 9,000 | (Norway) Arne Sandstø |
| Sandnes Ulf | Sandnes | Sandnes Idrettspark | 3,000 | (Norway) Asle Andersen |
| Strømmen | Strømmen | Strømmen Stadion | 3,000 | (Norway) Thomas Berntsen |

=== Managerial changes ===
| Team | Outgoing manager | Manner of departure | Date of vacancy | Table | Incoming manager | Date of appointment | Table |
|---|---|---|---|---|---|---|---|
| Sandefjord | (Republic of Ireland) Patrick Walker | Sacked | 9 May 2011 | 11th | (Norway) Arne Sandstø | 23 May 2011 | 11th |
| Løv-Ham | (Norway) Arne Sandstø | Signed by Sandefjord | 23 May 2011 | 15th | (Norway) Tom Mangersnes | 24 May 2011 | 15th |
| Bodø/Glimt | (Norway) Kåre Ingebrigtsen | Resigned | 26 May 2011 | 14th | (Norway) Cato André Hansen | 24 June 2011 | 9th |
| Kongsvinger | (Norway) Per Brogeland | Sacked | 30 August 2011 | 11th | (Norway) Tom Nordlie | 1 September 2011 | 11th |

== League table ==
| Pos | Team | Pld | W | D | L | GF | GA | GD | Pts | Promotion or relegation |
|---|---|---|---|---|---|---|---|---|---|---|
| 1 | Hønefoss (C, P) | 30 | 16 | 9 | 5 | 61 | 28 | +33 | 57 | Promotion to Tippeligaen |
| 2 | Sandnes Ulf (P) | 30 | 18 | 2 | 10 | 58 | 32 | +26 | 56 | Promotion to Tippeligaen |
| 3 | Sandefjord | 30 | 16 | 5 | 9 | 61 | 38 | +23 | 53 | |
| 4 | Ranheim | 30 | 15 | 7 | 8 | 61 | 39 | +22 | 52 | |
| 5 | Bodø/Glimt | 30 | 15 | 7 | 8 | 52 | 38 | +14 | 52 | |
| 6 | HamKam | 30 | 14 | 9 | 7 | 52 | 40 | +12 | 51 | |
| 7 | Kongsvinger | 30 | 14 | 7 | 9 | 50 | 36 | +14 | 49 | |
| 8 | Hødd | 30 | 13 | 7 | 10 | 54 | 42 | +12 | 46 | |
| 9 | Bryne | 30 | 11 | 11 | 8 | 47 | 36 | +11 | 44 | |
| 10 | Mjøndalen | 30 | 10 | 10 | 10 | 42 | 51 | −9 | 40 | |
| 11 | Alta | 30 | 10 | 9 | 11 | 45 | 51 | −6 | 39 | |
| 12 | Strømmen | 30 | 9 | 7 | 14 | 43 | 58 | −15 | 34 | |
| 13 | Asker (R) | 30 | 9 | 7 | 14 | 38 | 56 | −18 | 34 | Relegation to Second Division |
| 14 | Nybergsund (R) | 30 | 6 | 5 | 19 | 42 | 72 | −30 | 23 | Relegation to Second Division |
| 15 | Randaberg (R) | 30 | 4 | 5 | 21 | 37 | 87 | −50 | 17 | Relegation to Second Division |
| 16 | Løv-Ham (Note: Løv-Ham were deducted a total 1 points: 1 point because of lack of financial control) (R) | 30 | 4 | 5 | 21 | 32 | 71 | −39 | 16 | Relegation to Second Division |

Source: nifs.no
Rules for classification: 1) points; 2) goal difference; 3) number of goals scored.
(C) Champions; (P) Promoted; (R) Relegated

== Results ==
| Home \ Away | ALT | AFK | BOD | BRY | HK | ILH | HØN | KIL | LØV | MIF | NIL | RIL | RF | SF | ULF | SIF |
|---|---|---|---|---|---|---|---|---|---|---|---|---|---|---|---|---|
| Alta | — | 3–4 | 3–3 | 0–0 | 1–5 | 2–2 | 1–4 | 2–1 | 2–0 | 4–1 | 2–0 | 4–1 | 1–0 | 1–2 | 0–2 | 1–1 |
| Asker | 1–4 | — | 1–0 | 1–1 | 1–1 | 0–3 | 1–2 | 2–1 | 3–0 | 1–1 | 2–0 | 0–0 | 2–1 | 1–2 | 0–1 | 0–0 |
| Bodø/Glimt | 0–0 | 3–0 | — | 3–0 | 1–1 | 3–1 | 0–0 | 4–2 | 0–2 | 1–0 | 3–0 | 4–1 | 1–1 | 1–1 | 3–1 | 3–1 |
| Bryne | 2–2 | 2–2 | 1–2 | — | 0–3 | 0–1 | 0–1 | 0–2 | 0–0 | 0–0 | 2–2 | 7–0 | 3–1 | 2–1 | 3–5 | 5–0 |
| HamKam | 2–0 | 2–1 | 2–2 | 1–2 | — | 2–1 | 1–0 | 0–2 | 2–2 | 0–0 | 1–0 | 3–0 | 0–1 | 1–4 | 2–2 | 4–2 |
| Hødd | 3–0 | 3–0 | 3–0 | 0–1 | 3–1 | — | 0–4 | 0–2 | 3–4 | 2–2 | 3–0 | 2–1 | 0–0 | 1–2 | 2–1 | 4–0 |
| Hønefoss BK | 2–0 | 0–1 | 3–2 | 1–1 | 1–1 | 1–1 | — | 2–1 | 2–0 | 3–0 | 5–3 | 6–0 | 2–1 | 2–3 | 1–0 | 1–2 |
| Kongsvinger | 1–1 | 1–0 | 2–0 | 0–2 | 3–3 | 1–1 | 2–2 | — | 4–0 | 2–0 | 1–0 | 4–1 | 3–3 | 3–0 | 1–0 | 1–1 |
| Løv-Ham | 1–2 | 0–1 | 0–1 | 0–2 | 2–2 | 0–1 | 2–5 | 0–1 | — | 0–0 | 2–3 | 4–3 | 2–5 | 1–2 | 0–3 | 3–0 |
| Mjøndalen | 3–0 | 4–3 | 2–4 | 0–0 | 1–3 | 3–1 | 2–2 | 2–2 | 0–0 | — | 5–2 | 3–1 | 1–2 | 4–2 | 2–1 | 2–1 |
| Nybergsund | 2–2 | 1–1 | 0–2 | 1–2 | 4–0 | 3–5 | 0–5 | 1–0 | 3–1 | 0–1 | — | 3–3 | 1–3 | 4–2 | 2–1 | 2–6 |
| Randaberg | 2–2 | 2–4 | 2–0 | 2–1 | 1–3 | 2–2 | 0–2 | 0–4 | 4–0 | 1–1 | 3–2 | — | 1–4 | 1–5 | 1–2 | 1–2 |
| Ranheim | 1–0 | 4–0 | 3–2 | 2–2 | 1–2 | 2–5 | 2–2 | 4–0 | 1–0 | 3–0 | 4–1 | 3–0 | — | 2–1 | 0–1 | 4–1 |
| Sandefjord | 3–1 | 5–1 | 1–2 | 1–1 | 1–2 | 1–0 | 0–0 | 1–2 | 2–1 | 6–0 | 2–0 | 4–0 | 1–1 | — | 1–1 | 2–1 |
| Sandnes Ulf | 1–2 | 4–1 | 3–0 | 0–1 | 0–2 | 3–0 | 1–0 | 3–1 | 6–0 | 4–1 | 1–0 | 4–2 | 2–0 | 1–0 | — | 2–0 |
| Strømmen | 1–2 | 2–1 | 1–2 | 2–4 | 1–0 | 1–1 | 0–0 | 1–0 | 6–2 | 0–1 | 2–2 | 2–1 | 2–2 | 0–3 | 4–2 | — |

Source: NIFS (in Norwegian)
Legend: Blue = home team win; Yellow = draw; Red = away team win.

== Statistics ==
=== Top goalscorers ===
| Rank | Scorer | Club | Goals |
|---|---|---|---|
| 1 | (Norway) Vegard Braaten | Alta | 18 |
| 2 | (Norway) Jo Sondre Aas | Ranheim | 16 |
| 2 | (Norway) Michael Karlsen | Hødd | 16 |
| 4 | (Norway) Kamal Saaliti | Sandnes Ulf | 15 |
| 4 | (Norway) Morten Eriksen | Sandnes Ulf | 15 |
| 6 | (Norway) Adama Diomande | Hødd | 14 |
| 6 | (Senegal) Remond Mendy | Nybergsund-Trysil†/Hønefoss | 14 |
| 6 | (Norway) Robert Stene | Ranheim | 14 |
| 9 | (Norway) Jim Johansen | Bodø/Glimt | 13 |
| 10 | (Norway) Aksel Berget Skjølsvik | Sandnes Ulf | 12 |
| 10 | (Norway) Andreas Moen | Strømmen | 12 |
| 10 | (Norway) Aram Khalili | Bodø/Glimt | 12 |

†Remond Mendy scored nine goals in fifteen games for Nybergsund IL-Trysil.

Source: Alt om fotball
