= 2010 Eliteserien promotion/relegation play-offs =

Norwegian football league play-offs

The 2010 Eliteserien promotion/relegation play-offs was the 38th time a spot in the Norwegian top flight was decided by play-off matches between top tier and second-level clubs.

At the end of the 2010 season, Kongsvinger and Sandefjord were relegated directly to the 2011 1. divisjon, and was replaced by Sogndal and Sarpsborg 08 who were directly promoted.

== Background ==
The play-offs between Eliteserien and 1. divisjon have been held every year since 1972 with exceptions in 1994 and 2011. In 2010 they took place for the two divisions following the conclusion of the regular season and are contested by the fourteenth-placed club in Eliteserien and the three clubs finishing below the automatic promotion places in 1. divisjon. The fixtures are determined by final league position – two semifinals: 14th in Eliteserien v 6th in 1. divisjon and 4th v 5th, and the winner then play each other to determine who play in Eliteserien the next season.

== Qualified teams ==
Four teams entered a play-off for the last Eliteserien spot for the 2011 season. These were:

- Hønefoss (14th placed team in the Tippeligaen)
- Fredrikstad (third placed team in the 1. divisjon)
- Løv-Ham (fourth placed team in the 1. divisjon)
- Ranheim (fifth placed team in the 1. divisjon)

The four teams first played single game knockout semifinals, with the winners (Hønefoss and Fredrikstad) advancing to a two-legged final for the 16th and last spot in the 2011 Eliteserien season. Fredrikstad were promoted to the top flight with an 8–1 win on aggregate against Hønefoss.

== Matches ==
=== First round ===
Final league position – 1. divisjon
Pos	Team	Pld	W	D	L	GF	GA	GD	Pts
3	Fredrikstad	28	14	8	6	53	37	+16	50
4	Løv-Ham	28	13	4	11	46	38	+8	43
5	Ranheim	28	12	7	9	37	38	–1	43

12 November 2010
18:00 CET (UTC+1)

Fredrikstad	2–0	Løv-Ham
Thorvaldsson 38'; Borges 57'	Report

Fredrikstad Stadion, Fredrikstad
Attendance: 4,528
Referee: Brage Sandmoen
14 November 2010
20:00 CET (UTC+1)

Hønefoss	2–1 (a.e.t.)	Ranheim
Konate 63', 120'	Report	Stene 55'

Aka Arena, Hønefoss
Referee: Svein-Erik Edvartsen

=== Final ===
The 14th-placed Eliteserien team, Hønefoss, took part in a two-legged play-off against third-placed 1. divisjon team Fredrikstad, to decide who would play in the 2011 Tippeligaen.

First leg

21 November 2010
15:00 CET (UTC+1)

Hønefoss	1–4	Fredrikstad
Saaliti 29'	Report	Piiroja 6'; Borges 16'; Askar 19'; Valencia 75'

Aka Arena, Hønefoss
Attendance: 2,885
Referee: Tommy Skjerven

Second leg

25 November 2010
20:00 CET (UTC+1)

Fredrikstad	4–0	Hønefoss
Borges 39', 54', 66'; Piiroja 42'	Report

Fredrikstad Stadion, Fredrikstad
Attendance: 9,201
Referee: Svein Oddvar Moen

Fredrikstad won 8–1 on aggregate and were promoted to the 2011 Tippeligaen; Hønefoss were relegated to the 1. divisjon.

== Bracket ==
First round
14	Hønefoss (a.e.t.)	2
5	Ranheim	1
3	Fredrikstad	2
4	Løv-Ham	0

Final round
14	Hønefoss	1	0	1
3	Fredrikstad	4	4	8
