= Robert Stene =

Norwegian footballer (born 1983)

Personal information
- Date of birth: 6 January 1983 (age 43)
- Place of birth: Trondheim, Norway
- Height: 1.88 m (6 ft 2 in)
- Position: Striker

Youth career
- Strindheim IL

Senior career*
Years	Team	Apps	(Gls)
- Strindheim IL
- Byåsen
- Freidig
2004–2005	Nidelv		
2005	Ranheim		
2006–2007	Hønefoss		
2007–2008	Ranheim		
2009	Randaberg		
2009–2010	Stavanger	10	(4)
2010–2012	Ranheim	74	(34)
2012–2014	Fredrikstad	67	(19)
2015–2016	Ranheim	59	(35)
2017–2018	Levanger	54	(22)
2019	Melhus	20	(9)
2020	Nardo	8	(0)
- * Club domestic league appearances and goals

Robert Stene (born 6 January 1983) is a retired Norwegian footballer.

Stene was the top scorer for Ranheim in 2010 and 2012.

Before the 2012 season he signed a contract with Fredrikstad. On 8 December 2014 he returned to his former club Ranheim. On 7 December 2016 he signed a contract for Levanger.

== Career statistics ==
As of 14 July 2020

Season	Club	Division	League		Cup		Total	
Season	Club	Division	Apps	Goals	Apps	Goals	Apps	Goals
2009	Stavanger	Adeccoligaen	10	4	0	0	10	4
2010	Ranheim	Adeccoligaen	27	9	4	2	31	11
2011	Ranheim	Adeccoligaen	28	14	2	2	30	16
2012	Ranheim	Adeccoligaen	19	11	0	0	19	11
2012	Fredrikstad	Tippeligaen	10	3	0	0	10	3
2013	Fredrikstad	Adeccoligaen	29	12	2	0	31	12
2014	Fredrikstad	1. divisjon	28	4	1	0	29	4
2015	Ranheim	OBOS-ligaen	29	17	2	5	31	22
2016	Ranheim	OBOS-ligaen	30	18	1	0	31	18
2017	Levanger	OBOS-ligaen	28	15	1	1	29	16
2018	Levanger	OBOS-ligaen	26	7	3	1	29	8
2019	Melhus	Norsk Tipping-ligaen	20	9	0	0	20	9
2020	Nardo	PostNord-ligaen	1	0	0	0	1	0
Career Total			285	123	16	11	301	134
