= Kenneth Dokken =

Norwegian footballer (born 1978)

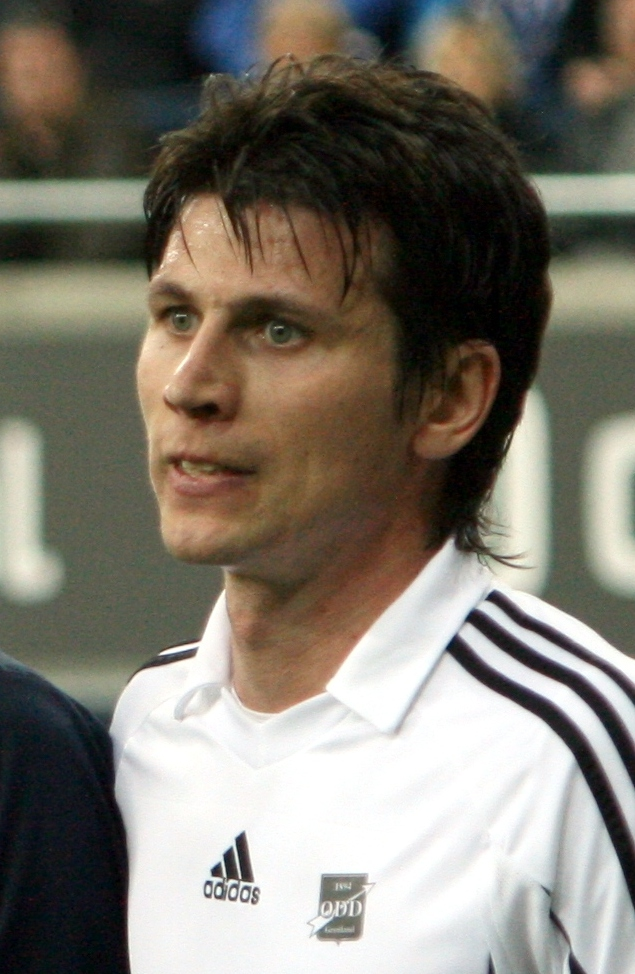
- Dokken with Odd in 2009

Personal information
- Date of birth: 10 October 1978 (age 48)
- Place of birth: Lørenskog, Norway
- Height: 1.83 m (6 ft 0 in)
- Position: Midfielder

Youth career
- Kolstad

Senior career*
| Years | Team | Apps | (Gls) |
| 1996–1998 | Strømsgodset | 19 | (1) |
| 1998 | → Hønefoss (loan) | 16 | (8) |
| 1999–2003 | Hønefoss | 106 | (39) |
| 2004–2005 | HamKam | 46 | (4) |
| 2006–2007 | Strømsgodset | 27 | (3) |
| 2007 | → HamKam (loan) | 16 | (3) |
| 2008–2009 | Odd Grenland | 47 | (5) |
| 2009–2010 | Ranheim | 24 | (5) |
| 2010–2012 | Sandefjord | 27 | (12) |

Managerial career
- 2008–2009: Birkebeineren
- 2011–2012: Birkebeineren
- 2012–2019: Notodden
- 2020–2022: Vålerenga (assistant)
- 2022–2024: AGF (assistant)
- 2024: Odd
- 2025–2026: Fredrikstad (assistant)
- 2026–: HamKam (assistant)
- * Club domestic league appearances and goals as of 9 May 2012

Kenneth Dokken (born 10 October 1978) is a Norwegian football manager and former football midfielder.

== Career ==
He is best known for a violent off-the-ball tackle on Johan Arneng.

Kenneth Dokken was head coach of IF Birkebeineren. He was head coach at Notodden from 2012 to 2019.

On 1 Februery 2026, Dokken joined Israeli Premier League club Maccabi Tel Aviv F.C. as an assistant coach under Ronny Deila.

== Personal life ==
He is the son of former Norway international striker Arne Dokken.

== Career statistics ==
| Club | Season | Division | League | | Cup | | Total | |
| Club | Season | Division | Apps | Goals | Apps | Goals | Apps | Goals |
|---|---|---|---|---|---|---|---|---|
| HamKam | 2004 | Tippeligaen | 25 | 3 | 5 | 2 | 30 | 5 |
| HamKam | 2005 | Tippeligaen | 21 | 1 | 5 | 3 | 26 | 4 |
| HamKam | Total | | 46 | 4 | 10 | 5 | 56 | 9 |
| Strømsgodset | 2006 | 1. divisjon | 15 | 3 | 1 | 1 | 16 | 4 |
| Strømsgodset | 2007 | Tippeligaen | 12 | 0 | 3 | 3 | 15 | 3 |
| Strømsgodset | Total | | 27 | 3 | 4 | 4 | 31 | 7 |
| HamKam (loan) | 2007 | 1. divisjon | 16 | 3 | 0 | 0 | 16 | 3 |
| Odd Grenland | 2008 | 1. divisjon | 28 | 4 | 2 | 4 | 30 | 8 |
| Odd Grenland | 2009 | Tippeligaen | 19 | 1 | 5 | 1 | 24 | 2 |
| Odd Grenland | Total | | 47 | 5 | 7 | 5 | 54 | 10 |
| Ranheim | 2010 | 1. divisjon | 24 | 5 | 4 | 2 | 28 | 7 |
| Sandefjord | 2011 | 1. divisjon | 25 | 11 | 3 | 2 | 28 | 13 |
| Sandefjord | 2012 | 1. divisjon | 2 | 1 | 0 | 0 | 2 | 1 |
| Sandefjord | Total | | 27 | 12 | 3 | 2 | 30 | 14 |
| Career total | | | 197 | 32 | 28 | 18 | 225 | 50 |
