= Terje Liknes =

Norwegian football manager (born 1959)

Personal information
- Date of birth: 4 June 1959 (age 67)
- Place of birth: Oslo, Norway
- Position: Midfielder

Youth career
- Årvoll
- 1978: Skeid

Senior career*
Years	Team	Apps	(Gls)
–1977	Årvoll		
1978	Skeid		
1979–1980	Jevnaker		
1981–1982	Vålerenga	0	(0)
1983	Jevnaker		
1984–1987	Vikersund		
1988–1991	Liv/Fossekallen		

Managerial career
- 1984–1987: Vikersund (player-coach)
- 1988–1991: Liv/Fossekallen (player-coach)
- 1992: Liv/Fossekallen (youth)
- 1992–1993: Liv/Fossekallen
- 1994–2000: Norway youth national teams
- 2001–2002: Norway women (assistant)
- * Club domestic league appearances and goals

Terje Liknes (born 4 June 1959) is a Norwegian football manager.

== Playing career ==
He played youth football for Årvoll IL, among others reaching the semi-final of the 1977 Norwegian Youth Cup, with teammates such as André Krogsæter. He also started his senior career there, but manager Dag Vestlund counted on losing Liknes to a better club. After Årvoll he played for Skeid in 1978, then Jevnaker IF. He moved to the region due to performing military service a Hvalsmoen.

In 1981 he joined first-level club Vålerengens IF, but was not given a gold medal for Vålerengen's 1981 Norwegian league victory due to not playing enough games. He played one single game for Vålerenga, against Dinamo Bucuresti in the 1982–83 European Cup preliminary round, before returning to Jevnaker.

== Coaching career ==
He left Jevnaker after the 1983 season, and in 1984 he became player-manager of Vikersund IF. In 1988 he took the same position in Liv/Fossekallen. He was player-manager for four years, then U20 coach in 1992. His replacement as manager was sacked halfway into the season, and Liknes returned to the helm where he served until leaving L/F in late 1993. He led the team to promotion to the third tier, where they finished second in 1989 and 1990, third in 1991, and second in 1992.

In 1994 he left the league system to become head coach of Norway youth national teams. He doubled as the Football Association's head of regional development in Southern and Southeastern Norway. His first assignment was with Norway U18, the boys' 1976 national team, spearheaded by strikers Torstein Helstad and Steffen Iversen.

From 1 January 2001 he was assistant manager of the Norway women's national football team, embarking on a two-year contract to coach the Olympic champions from the previous year. He was succeeded by Hans Knutsen in 2002. Liknes continued in the Football Association, first as a player developer, then as administrative director for the youth national teams.

== Personal life ==
Terje Liknes settled in Haugsbygd, where he helped as a children's coach.

His son Kjetil Liknes moved from Haugsbygd IF to Hønefoss BK as a youth player in 2001, and played for HBK in the First Division until losing motivation. Kjetil Liknes was also capped for Norway U16, U17 and U18.
