= Arne Dokken =

Norwegian footballer and coach (born 1955)

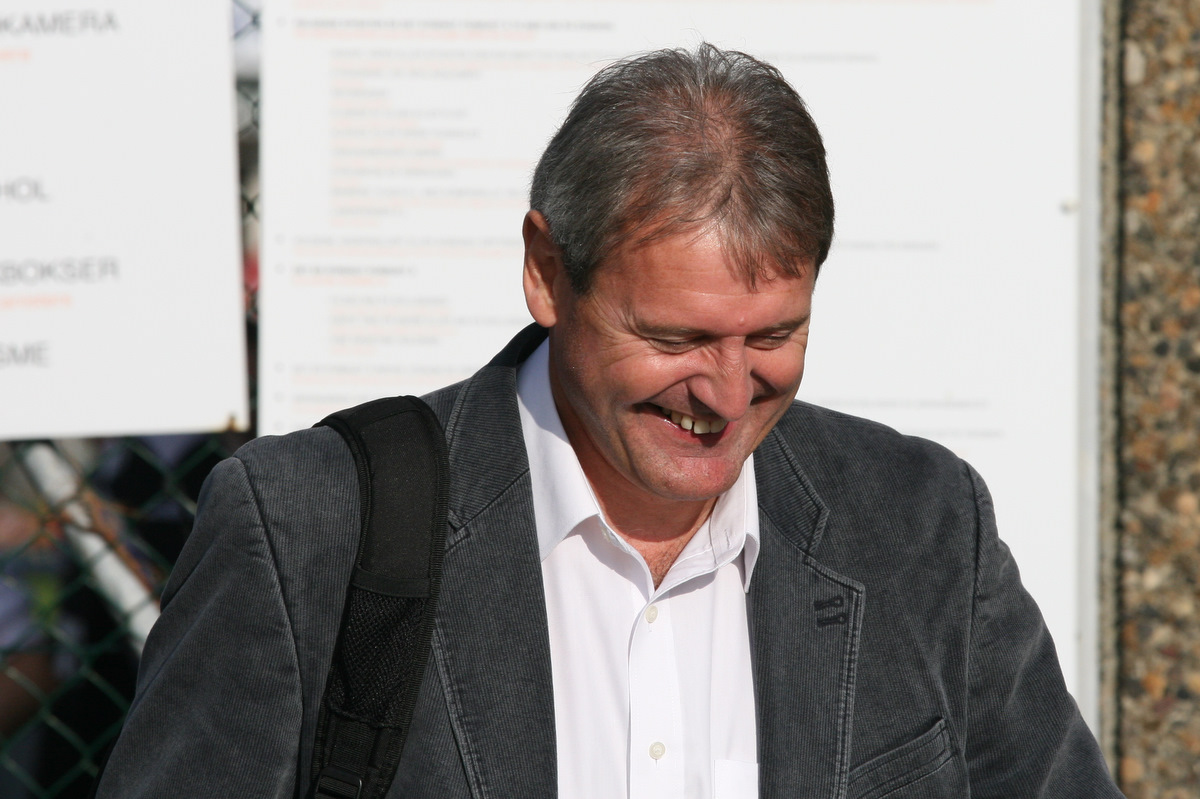

Personal information
- Full name: Arne Dokken
- Date of birth: 27 August 1955 (age 71)
- Place of birth: Drammen, Norway
- Position: Forward

Youth career
- Åssiden IF

Senior career*
Years	Team	Apps	(Gls)
1975–1977	Strømsgodset	43	(26)
1978–1981	Lillestrøm SK	79	(35)
1981–1983	Panathinaikos	23	(10)
1983–1984	Apollon Athens	24	(6)
1984–1986	Rosenborg	25	(5)

International career
1975–1984	Norway	24	(2)

Managerial career
- 1985: Rosenborg
- 1986–1987: Rosenborg
- 2000–2002: Strømsgodset
- 2004: Sandefjord
- * Club domestic league appearances and goals

Arne Dokken (born 27 August 1955) is a Norwegian former football player and coach. He played as forward for several Norwegian clubs and two Greek clubs and 24 matches for Norway national football team scoring two goals. In eight seasons in the Norwegian top division he played 147 matches scoring 64 goals. He was top scorer in 1. divisjon in 1975 and 1980. His son Kenneth Dokken also became a footballer.

== Playing career ==
=== Club career ===
Arne Dokken was born in Drammen, started his career in Åssiden IF and went to Strømsgodset IF 19 years old. In the 1975 season he became top scorer in Norwegian top flight. He continued to Lillestrøm SK winning gold medals in the Norwegian Cup 1978 and the league 1981. He then became professional in Panathinaikos in Greece and on loan to Apollon Athens also in Greece before he returned to Norway where he finished his career as player in Rosenborg BK.

=== International career ===
Dokken was capped once for Norway boys team, four times for the Norway u-19 and 11 times for Norway u-21. He was capped 24 times for the Norway national football team scoring two goals.

== Managerial career ==
He started his career as coach in Rosenborg 1985 successfully as the team won gold medals. He was thereafter director of sports in Rosenborg BK and in FC Lyn Oslo. He continued to Strømsgodset IF as coach and head of sports and to Sandefjord Fotball where he was head coach in the 2004 season. He then became sports director in Hønefoss BK before he returned to Sandefjord Fotball as sports director.

== Honours ==
=== As a player ===
Lillestrøm SK

- Norwegian top division: 1981; runner up: 1978
- Norwegian Cup: 1978, 1981; runner up: 1980

Panathinaikos

- Alpha Ethniki; runner up: 1981–1982
- Greek Cup: 1982

=== As a manager ===
Rosenborg

- Norwegian top division: 1985
