= Mika Pulkkinen =

Finnish football coach and former player (born 1972)

Personal information
- Date of birth: 29 December 1972 (age 53)
- Place of birth: Kotka, Finland
- Height: 1.84 m (6 ft 0 in)
- Position: Midfielder

Youth career
- KTP

Senior career*
Years	Team	Apps	(Gls)
1989–1996	KTP	104	(7)
1997	TP-Seinäjoki	26	(3)
1998–1999	Kotkan TP	49	(11)
1999–2000	Heerenveen	5	(0)
2000–2001	SW Bregenz	11	(0)
2001	Atlantis	12	(0)
2002	AC Allianssi	3	(0)
2002	→ AC Vantaa (loan)	1	(0)
2002	→ KooTeePee (loan)	10	(0)
2003	KooTeePee	16	(1)

Managerial career
- 2013–2016: KTP (coaching director)
- 2017–2019: HJS (coaching director)
- 2020: RoPS (assistant)
- 2020–2022: RoPS (coaching director)
- 2022: Hønefoss
- 2023: KuPS II
- * Club domestic league appearances and goals

Mika Pulkkinen (born 29 December 1972) is a Finnish football coach and a former player who played as a midfielder. Pulkkinen started football in his hometown club KTP. Besides in his native Finland, Pulkkinen played for Heerenveen in Dutch Eredivisie and for SW Bregenz in Austrian Bundesliga. During his career, he made 81 appearances in Finnish top-tier Veikkausliiga for TP-Seinäjoki, Kotkan TP, Atlantis, Allianssi and KooTeePee, scoring nine goals in total.

After his playing career, Pulkkinen has worked as a coaching director for KTP, HJS and RoPS, which he also coached. In 2022, he worked as a head coach of Norwegian club Hønefoss.
