= Hamar stadion =

Bandy stadium in Hamar, Norway

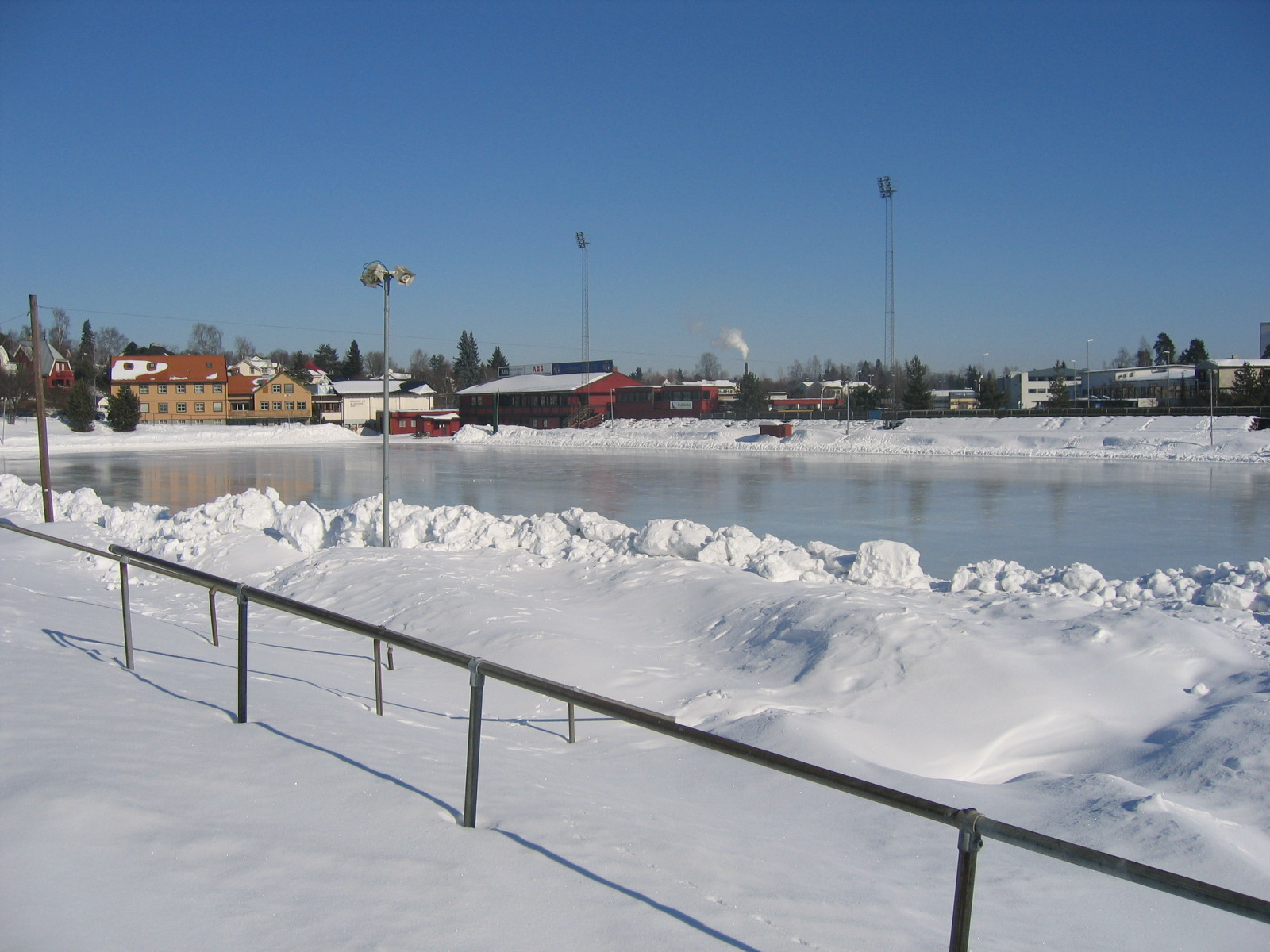
- Interactive map of Hamar stadion
- Location: Hamar, Norway
- Coordinates: 60°47′46″N 11°04′45″E
- Owner: Hamar Municipality
- Operator: Hamar IL
- Capacity: 30,000

Construction
- Closed: 2010

Tenants
- Briskeby FL (1933–36); ISU Speed Skating World Cup; World Allround Speed Skating Championships for Men (1952, 1985); World Allround Speed Skating Championships for Women (1980, 1991); European Allround Speed Skating Championships (1934, 1948, 1953)

Hamar stadion is a former athletics, speed skating and bandy stadium in Hamar, Norway. The home ground of Hamar IL, it was owned by Hamar Municipality. It has held seven international speed skating events: the European Speed Skating Championships in 1934, 1948 and 1953, the World Allround Speed Skating Championships for Men in 1952 and 1985, and the World Allround Speed Skating Championships for Women in 1980 and 1991. The stadium has held 13 Norwegian Championships and 11 world records have been set at the venue.

== History ==
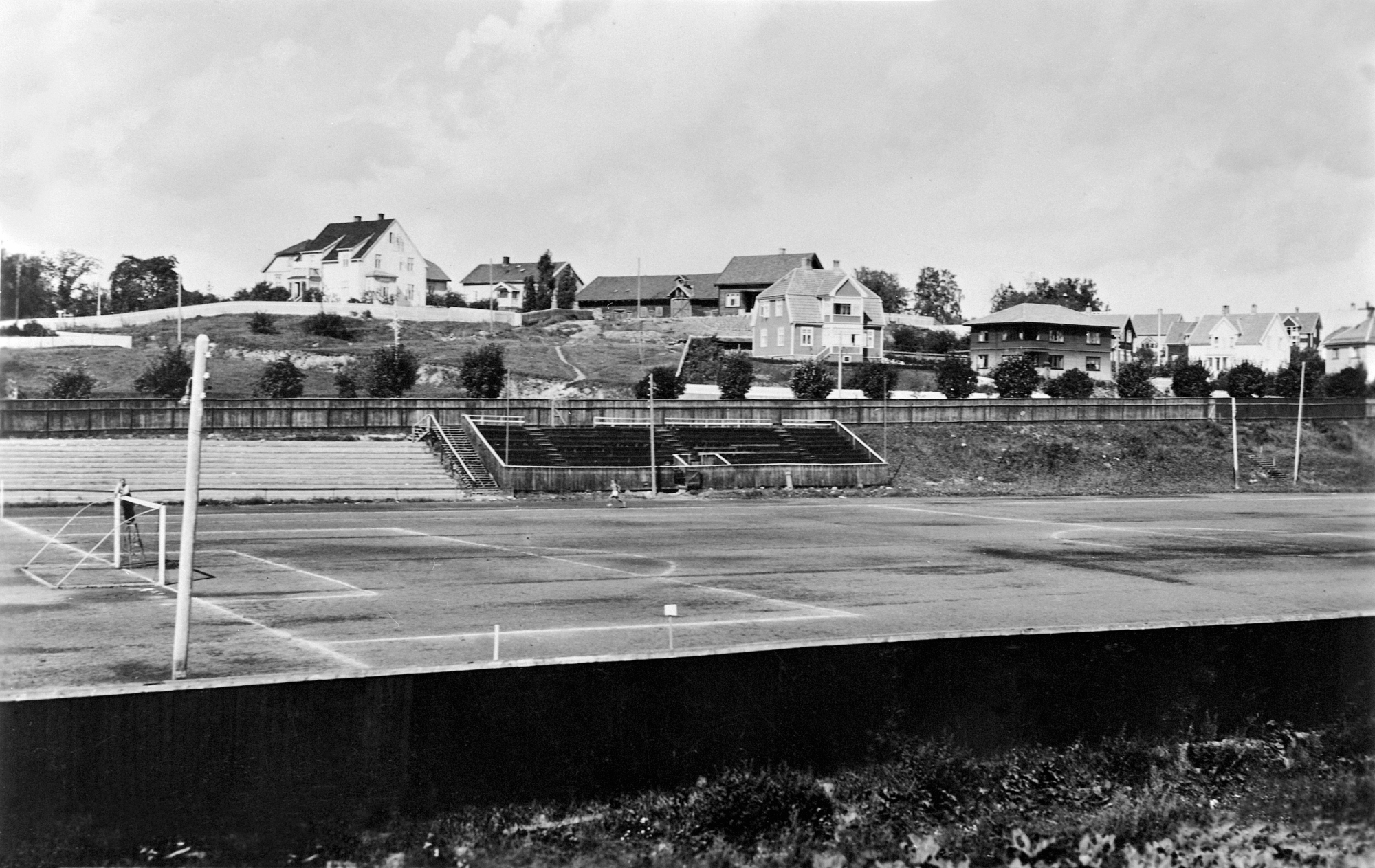
Hamar Idrettsplassen in 1934

In 1921, the stadium was leased to Oplandenes Turn- og Idrettspark. After maintenance was disregarded and a disagreement broke out between the sports clubs about the use of the stadium, the municipality had to cancel the lease in 1928 and management was transferred to Hamar IL. Until 1936, when Briskeby gressbane opened, Hamar stadion was one of several venues used for the football team Briskeby FL. Because the stadium lacked proper drainage, a new stadium was considered by the politicians at Kvitmyra.

Known as the Idrettsplassen at the time the stadium hosted motorcycle speedway around the outside of the central area. It held the final of the Norwegian Individual Speedway Championship in 1939.

A committee was established by the municipal council in 1945, but it concluded that it was better to upgrade the existing stadium, as Hamar had been awarded the 1948 European Speed Skating Championships. The event was seen by 26,000 spectators. During the summer of 1948, grass was laid on the stadium. The stadium also received two change rooms. For a long time during winter, there were regular flood light practices for the public on Wednesdays and Sundays. The inner field was used for bandy, while the running track was used for speed skating.

The record attendance dates from 1952, when 30,000 people watches Hjalmar Andersen set a new world record on the 10,000 meter: 16:32.6, which remained until the 1960 Winter Olympics. The European Speed Skating Championships were held again in 1953, and Dutchman Kees Broekmann characterized the venue as "the Mecca of speed skating". This was in part because of the good quality of the ice. Alf Ingvaldsen was responsible for icing for thirty years from the mid-1940s, and created a vehicle which was able to spread warm water on the top of the surface to polish the ice. The venue has hosted the Norwegian Athletics Championships in 1959 and 1971.

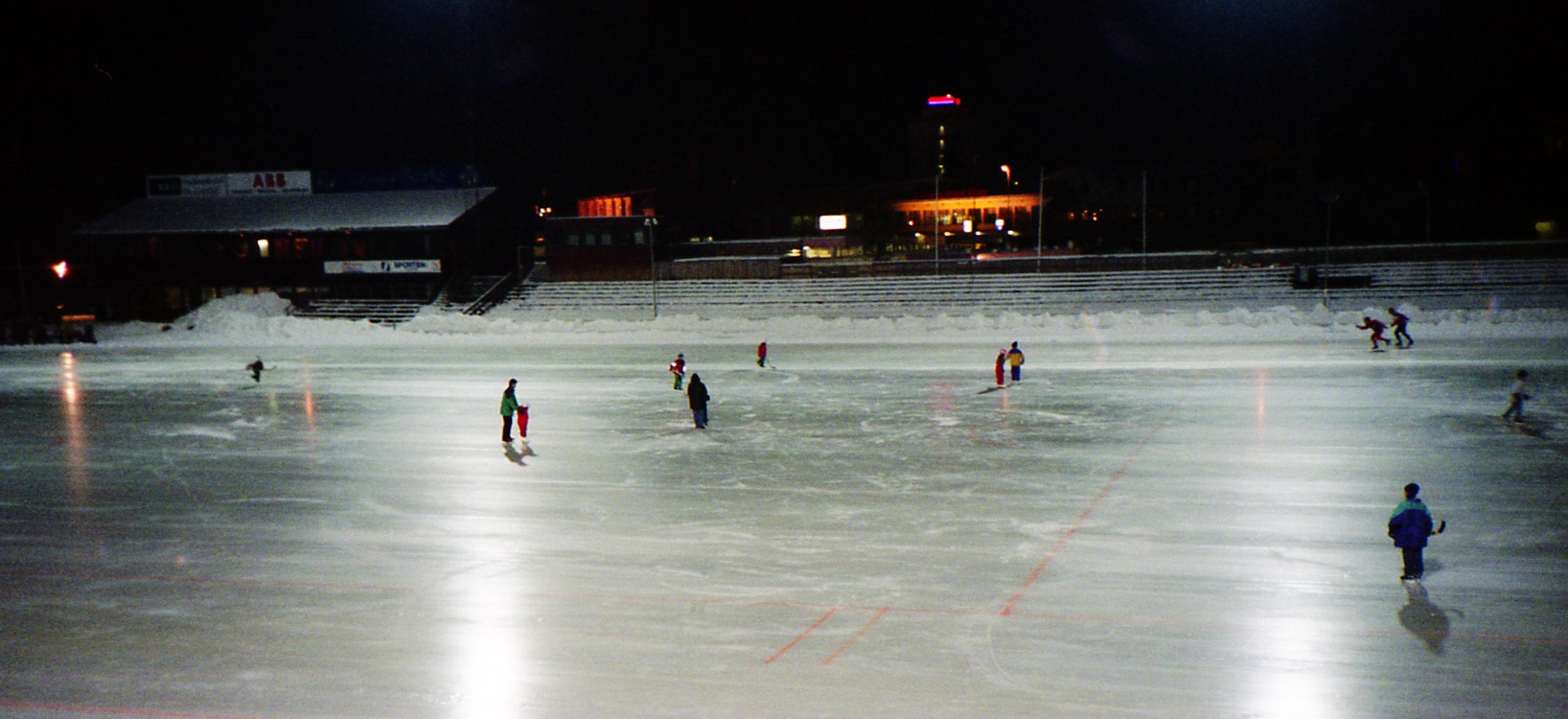
Hamar stadion in 1996

With the opening of Vikingskipet, an indoor speed skating venue, in 1993 for the 1994 Winter Olympics, Hamar stadion no longer was used for international and major speed skating tournaments. In 2007, the city sold the stadium to Sentrumsgården for 320 million Norwegian krone. They will build a combined commercial, shopping and residential complex with 80,000 square meters (860,000 sq ft) of real estate.
