= Chris Twiddy =

Welsh footballer (born 1976)

Personal information
- Date of birth: 19 January 1976 (age 50)
- Place of birth: Wales
- Position: Striker

Senior career*
Years	Team	Apps	(Gls)
1994–1996	Plymouth Argyle FC	17	(1)
1996	Sligo Rovers FC		
1997–1999	Hønefoss BK		
2000–2002	Hamarkameratene	49	(19)
2002	Skeid Fotball	5	(0)
2003	Kongsvinger IL Toppfotball	5	(1)
2004–2005	Hamar IL		
- * Club domestic league appearances and goals

Christopher Twiddy (born 19 January 1976) is a Welsh football manager and former footballer.

== Early life ==
Twiddy was born in 1976 in Wales. He lived in Saint Helena as a child.

== Career ==
Twiddy started his career with English side Plymouth Argyle FC. In 1996, he signed for Irish side Sligo Rovers FC. In 1997, he signed for Norwegian side Hønefoss BK. In 2000, he signed for Norwegian side Hamarkameratene. He was described as "gained the full trust of coach Cato Bakkemo, and is flourishing like never before" while playing for the club. After that, he signed for Norwegian side Skeid Fotball. In 2003, he signed for Norwegian side Kongsvinger IL Toppfotball. In 2004, he signed for Norwegian side Hamar IL.

== Personal life ==
After retiring from professional football, Twiddy worked as a football manager. He suffered heart problems in 2020.
