= Tom Mangersnes =

Norwegian football coach (born 1977)

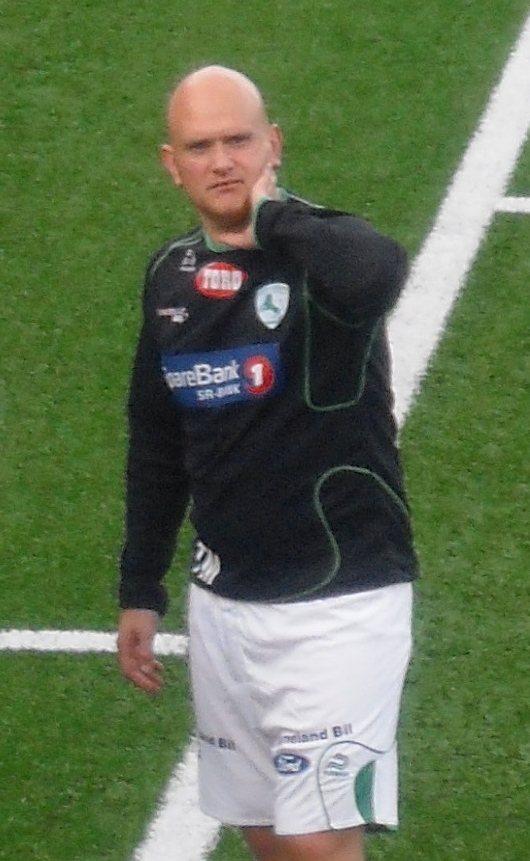

Personal information
- Date of birth: 4 January 1977 (age 49)
- Place of birth: Norway

Managerial career
- Years: Team
- –2006: Åsane (assistant)
- 2007: Åsane
- 2008–2011: Løv-Ham (assistant)
- 2011: Løv-Ham
- 2012–2014: Sogndal (assistant)
- 2016: Bodø/Glimt (assistant)
- 2017–: Åsane (assistant)

Tom Mangersnes (born 4 January 1977) is a Norwegian football coach.

He came through the system of Åsane as a youth coach. In the 2006 season he was the assistant coach of Åsane, and part-time analyst for Løv-Ham. In 2007, he became head coach of Åsane and analyst for Brann.

Ahead of the 2008 season he became assistant coach of Løv-Ham, promoted to head coach in mid-season 2011. The season ended with relegation from the First Division. After the 2011 season Mangersnes turned down an offer from Bryne to instead become assistant coach in Sogndal. This also gave him a chance to lecture in football analysis at the Sogn og Fjordane University College.
