= Peter Sørensen (footballer) =

Danish footballer and manager (born 1973)

Personal information
- Full name: Peter Østergaard Sørensen
- Date of birth: 24 March 1973 (age 53)
- Place of birth: Silkeborg, Denmark
- Position: Midfielder

Youth career
- Sejs-Svejbæk

Senior career*
Years	Team	Apps	(Gls)
1991–1995	Silkeborg	209	(?)
1996–1997	Groningen	17	(0)
1997–2000	Silkeborg	?	(?)
2000–2002	Malmö	?	(?)
2003–2005	Ham-Kam	63	(2)

International career
1991–1993	Denmark U-19	4	(0)
1993–1995	Denmark U-21	19	(5)

Managerial career
- 2004–2005: Ham-Kam (assistant)
- 2006–2008: Vejle (assistant)
- 2009–2010: Fredericia
- 2010–2014: AGF
- 2014: Ham-Kam
- 2015: Fredericia
- 2015–2018: Silkeborg
- 2019–2021: Hobro
- 2021–2022: Vejle
- * Club domestic league appearances and goals

Peter Østergaard Sørensen (born 24 March 1973) is a Danish football manager and former player. He was most recently the manager of Vejle.

== Honours ==
Silkeborg

- Danish Superliga: 1993–94
