= Morten Tandberg =

Norwegian football manager (born 1979)

Personal information
- Full name: Morten Tandberg Kallåk
- Date of birth: 11 March 1979 (age 47)

Team information
- Current team: Start (coach)

Managerial career
- Years: Team
- 2007–2009: Bærum (junior team)
- 2010–2014: Bærum
- 2015–2017: Vålerenga (assistant)
- 2018: Start (coach)

Morten Tandberg (born 11 March 1979) is a Norwegian football manager.

Tandberg had a modest playing career in local clubs in Bærum. He became player developer in Bærum SK in 2004, the advanced to junior coach in 2007 and head coach ahead of the 2010 season, succeeding Tomi Markovski. Tandberg steered the team to two promotions to the second tier and one playoff attempt to the highest league. Ahead of the 2015 season he was picked as the new assistant coach for the first-tier team Vålerenga Fotball. He was succeeded in Bærum by Roar Johansen, who lasted one season.

In 2018 he was close to signing on as head coach of Arendal Fotball. Instead he joined the coaching team of IK Start.
