= Svein Inge Haagenrud =

Norwegian footballer (born 1971)

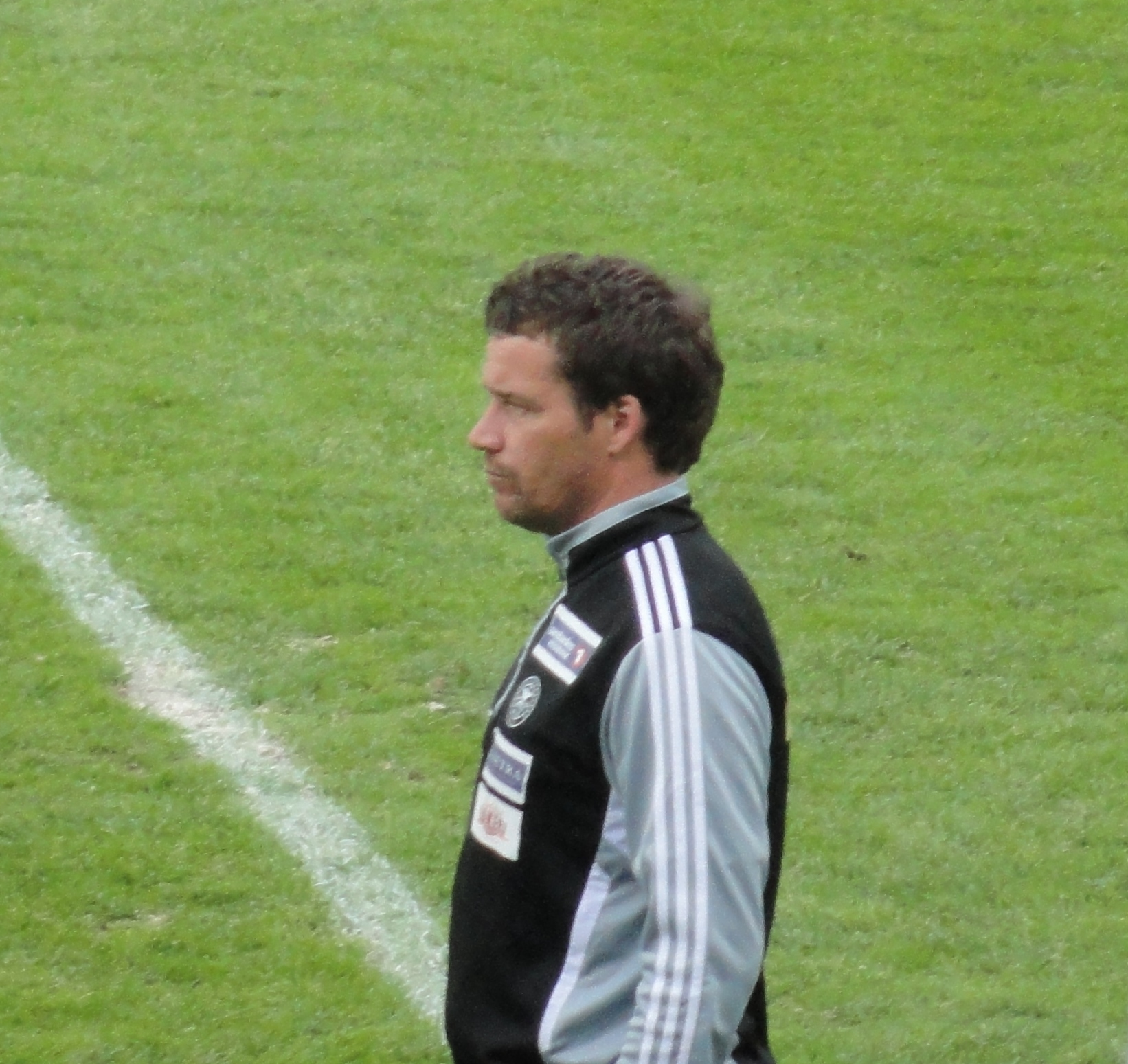

Personal information
- Date of birth: 8 November 1971 (age 54)
- Position: Goalkeeper

Youth career
- Sørumsand

Senior career*
Years	Team	Apps	(Gls)
1990–1991	Lillestrøm	10	(0)
1992	Sørumsand		
1993–1994	Nardo		
1995–1996	Kongsvinger	10	(0)
1997–2001	Skjetten/Romerike		
2001–2008	HamKam		

Managerial career
- 2008: Løten
- 2009: Elverum
- 2009: HamKam (coordinator)
- 2010–2014: HamKam (assistant)
- 2014: HamKam
- * Club domestic league appearances and goals

Svein Inge Haagenrud (born 8 November 1971) is a retired Norwegian football goalkeeper and later manager.

He played youth football for Sørumsand IF and is the son of Svein Haagenrud. He was a part of Lillestrøm's senior squad in 1990, and made his debut when Frode Grodås was sent off for punching an opponent, and during the subsequent suspension of Grodås. He did not play first-team football in 1991, so in 1992 he went back to Sørumsand, and in 1993 Nardo FK. Playing the 1995 and 1996 seasons for Kongsvinger, he got 10 league games and 1 cup game. In 1997 he went to Skjetten which also played under the Romerike Fotball moniker, until joining HamKam in 2001. He last featured for HamKam in 2007.

In the summer of 2008 he became head coach of Løten, signing for Elverum in 2009. This was a part-time job, and from early 2009 Haagenrud was also sports coordinator in HamKam. He was also assistant coach under Vegard Skogheim, advancing to head coach for a period in 2014.
