= Cato André Hansen =

Norwegian footballer and manager (born 1972)

Cato Hansen
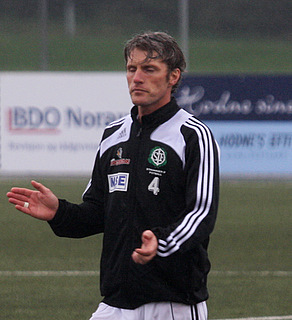
- Cato André Hansen

Personal information
- Full name: Cato André Hansen
- Date of birth: 28 November 1972 (age 53)
- Place of birth: Vågan, Norway
- Position: Defender

Youth career
- Strauman IL

Senior career*
Years	Team	Apps	(Gls)
–1995	Vågakameratene		
1995–2006	Bodø/Glimt	234	(15)
2006	Bryne	3	(0)
2007–2009	Stavanger IF		

Managerial career
- 2007–2009: Stavanger IF (player-coach)
- 2011–2012: Bodø/Glimt
- 2020–2023: Grand Bodø (women)
- 2024–2026: Bodø/Glimt (women)
- * Club domestic league appearances and goals

Cato André Hansen (born 28 November 1972) is a Norwegian football coach and former defender who played most of his career for Bodø/Glimt in the Norwegian Premier League. After a spell at Bryne, Hansen was player-coach at Stavanger IF for three seasons, and has later been head coach of Bodø/Glimt.

== Career ==
Hansen hails from Strauman in Vågan Municipality in Lofoten, and played for Strauman IL and Vågakameratene before he turned professional. He played for Bodø/Glimt from 1995 to 2006, playing 217 games in the Norwegian Premier League. He became captain of the club for the 2006 season. Three months into the season, Hansen accepted a contract offer for Bryne, and Bodø/Glimt agreed to let Hansen leave the club six months before his contract was due to expire.

After the 2006 season, Hansen was hired as player-coach for Stavanger IF in the Norwegian Second Division. After second place in the first season, Stavanger won the league in 2008 and was promoted to the Norwegian First Division. As Stavanger IF is a small club with limited economic means, they were relegated in their first season on a national level. Hansen returned home to Northern Norway and Bodø, where he started working as marketing director for the local handball side.

In the pre-season of 2011, he was hired as assistant manager to his former club Bodø/Glimt. As a result of poor results, the club's head coach Kåre Ingebrigtsen, left the club and left Hansen in charge. Bodø/Glimt announced one month later that Hansen would lead the team for the remainder of the 2011 season, and he led the team from the bottom of the table to fight for promotion, the club signed him for another season, with Tom Kåre Staurvik as assistant coach. After the 2012 season, Bodø/Glimt hired Jan Halvor Halvorsen as head coach instead of Hansen.
