= Roar Johansen (football manager) =

Norwegian football manager (born 1968)

Roar Johansen (born 19 November 1968) is a Norwegian football manager.

Johansen has been youth coach and goalkeeper coach at Moss FK, and has coached national youth teams for women.

Johansen became the main coach of Sarpsborg 08 FF after Conny Karlsson in the summer of 2009. One year later, Johansen and Sarpsborg 08 celebrated promotion to 2011 Tippeligaen. For this achievement, he was named "Coach of the Year" in 2010 Norwegian First Division by tipsgaming.com. In 2013 he managed Ull/Kisa. After a stint in Hønefoss he went on to Bærum ahead of the 2015 season. He was sacked after the 2015 season and started working with marketing and media in Sarpsborg 08. This job lasted until the end of the 2022 season.
