= Gaute Larsen =

Norwegian football manager (born 1961)

Personal information
- Full name: Alf Gaute Larsen
- Date of birth: 24 December 1961 (age 64)

Team information
- Current team: Stabæk (youth)

Youth career
- Hana
- Ulf-Sandnes
- Ullern

Senior career*
Years	Team	Apps	(Gls)
–1980	Ullern		
1981	Bærum		
1982–1995	Ullern		

Managerial career
- –1996: Ullern
- 1997: Bærum
- 1998–2001: Stabæk (assistant)
- 2001–2004: Stabæk
- 2005–2006: Odd (assistant)
- 2006–2007: Odd
- 2008–2012: Asker
- 2013–2016: Bryne
- 2017–: Stabæk (youth/developer)
- * Club domestic league appearances and goals

Gaute Larsen (born 24 December 1961) is a Norwegian football manager.

== Career ==
He grew up in Sandnes, being an ardent fan of Viking FK and playing childre's football for Ulf-Sandnes and Hana IL before moving to Oslo as a teenager. He played youth football in Ullern IF and started his senior career there. Ahead of the 1981 season, he joined Bærum SK. Soon after joining, he broke his leg. He returned to Ullern in 1982. Following a lengthy stay he left Ullern after the 1995 season, having been player-manager and team captain. Ahead of the 1997 season he was hired by Bærum SK as head coach.

In September 1997, Larsen gave notice to Bærum that he would leave the club. He was in talks with Vålerenga on becoming assistant manager, and was reportedly wanted by Odd as well, but chose Stabæk. He would be the assistant manager and lead the B team in matches.

As manager Anders Linderoth left following a 1–8 loss to Brann in May 2001, Larsen was promoted to manager. Among others, he led the team to bronze medals in the 2003 Tippeligaen, entailing qualification to the 2004–05 UEFA Cup. He was sacked in the fall of 2004, lamenting the club's sale of its best players.

Larsen was promptly signed by Odd as assistant manager, later being elevated to co-manager with Arne Sandstø. His next club was Asker. In late 2008, he attended meetings with Viking FK about possibly becoming assistant manager.

Larsen did move back to his native Rogaland as he was recruited from Asker to Bryne FK ahead of the 2013 season. He was sacked in May 2016. Internationally, Larsen is known as the manager who promoted a young Erling Haaland into the senior squad.

After that, he returned to Stabæk as a youth coach and player developer, succeeding Toni Ordinas. His role in nurturing Antonio Nusa was something out of the ordinary, because Larsen also picked him up and dropped him off at his home in Langhus, totalling several miles a week of driving.

== Personal life ==
While on vacation at Karon Beach, Larsen and his family survived the 2004 Indian Ocean tsunami.
