= Hønefoss BK =

Norwegian association football club

Hønefoss
- Full name: Hønefoss Ballklubb
- Nickname: HBK
- Founded: February 4, 1895; 131 years ago
- Ground: Aka Arena; Hønefoss
- Capacity: 4,256 (3,500 seated)
- Chairman: Bjørn Aasen
- Manager: Gunnar Halle
- League: 2. divisjon
- 2024: 3. divisjon group 6, 1st of 14 (promoted)
Home colours	Away colours

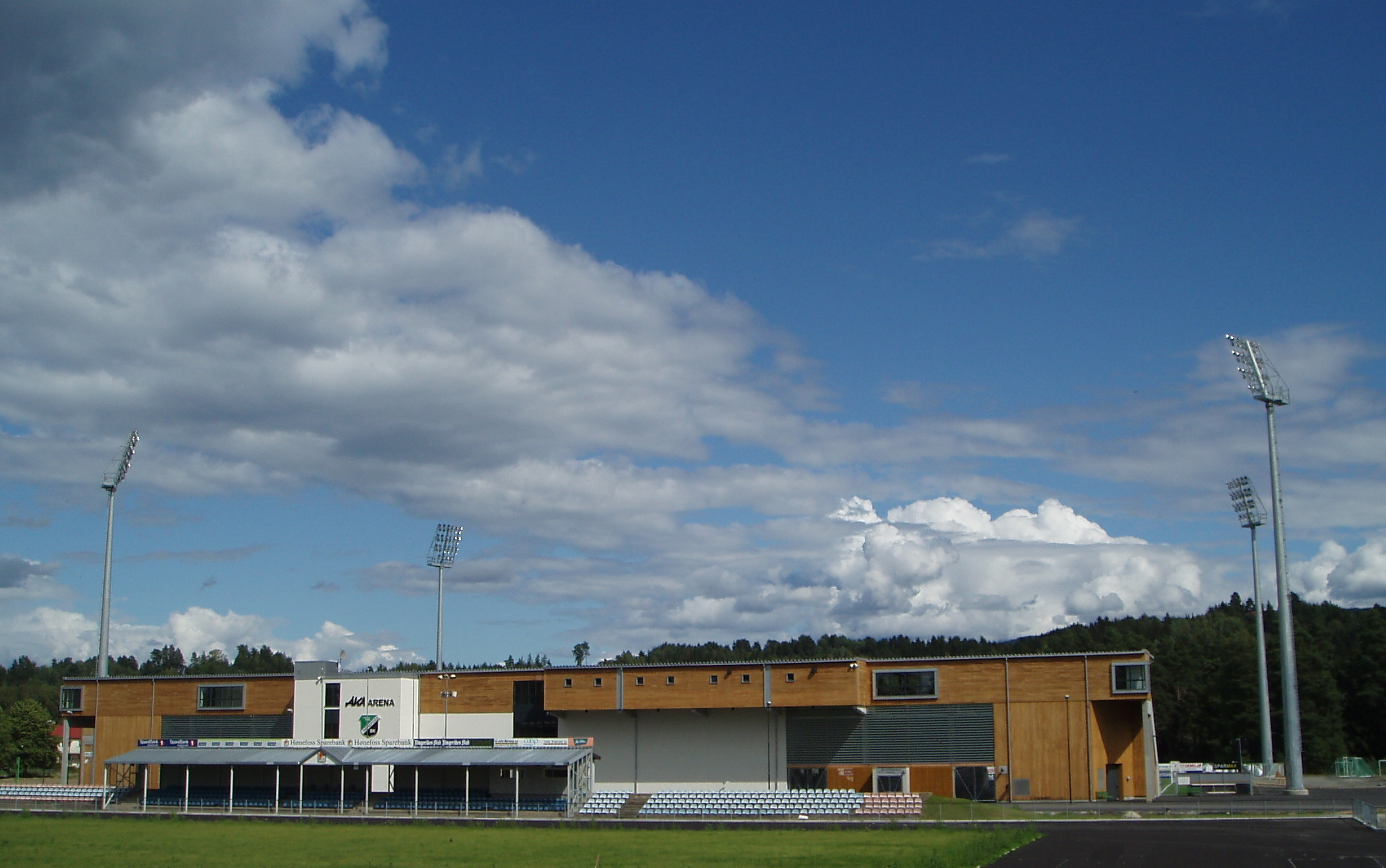
AKA Arena

Hønefoss Ballklubb is a Norwegian football club from Hønefoss, founded in 1895. The club was a part of the multi-sports club L/F Hønefoss, which folded in 2008.

After 11 years in 1. divisjon, the second tier of Norwegian football, Hønefoss was promoted to Tippeligaen in 2009, where they finished 14th in 2010 Tippeligaen and was relegated after a relegation-playoff against Fredrikstad. In 2011, Hønefoss won the 1. divisjon and was promoted to the Tippeligaen for the second time in three years. Their second spell in Tippeligaen lasted for two seasons, and they were again relegated to the 1. divisjon in 2013.

== History ==
IF Liv multi-sports club was founded on 4 February 1895, and it merged with Fossekallen sports club in 1986 to create Liv/Fossekallen, which in 1997 changed name to L/F Hønefoss multi-sports club. The same year, the football branch of the sports club became economic and organisationally independent under its new name L/F Hønefoss Fotball. In 2002, the football club changed name to its current name Hønefoss Ballklub, and in 2009 the football club was completely separated from the defunct L/F Hønefoss sports club.

Hønefoss competed in the Tippeligaen in 2010, the top tier of Norwegian football after promotion at the end of the 2009 season. Hønefoss got a tough start in their first season in Tippeligaen and lost their first six matches, something that ended in head coach Ole Bjørn Sundgot being fired. Tom Guldbrandsen immediately took over the job as head coach, Hønefoss won their next match 1–0 away against Stabæk. The 2010 season ended in 14th place, which resulted in relegation playoff matches to stay in Tippeligaen. In the first match, Hønefoss won the semi-final against Ranheim, but lost the final later on against Fredrikstad, and therefore got relegated to the 1. divisjon.

In the 2011 season they won the 1. divisjon, one point ahead of Sandnes Ulf, and was again promoted to the Tippeligaen. Remond Mendy was the team's top scorer with 14 goals. The team's second season in the Tippeligaen started much better than in 2010, and after five games, they had two wins and three draws, and was fifth in the table. Hønefoss eventually finished the 2012 season in 13th place. In the 2013 season, the club collected 29 points and finished the season in 16th place and was relegated to the 1. divisjon along with Tromsø.

== Recent seasons ==
Season	League	Grp	Tier	Pos.	Pl.	W	D	L	GS	GA	P	Cup	Notes
2001	1. divisjon		II	9	30	10	10	10	45	54	40	Third round	
2002	1. divisjon		II	4	30	18	4	8	64	36	58	Second round	
2003	1. divisjon		II	5	30	16	7	7	55	41	55	Third round	
2004	1. divisjon		II	12	30	11	4	15	52	54	37	Third round	
2005	1. divisjon		II	4	30	17	5	8	52	41	56	Semi-final	
2006	1. divisjon		II	4	30	15	6	9	64	47	51	Third round	
2007	1. divisjon		II	10	30	8	11	11	34	52	35	Third round	
2008	1. divisjon		II	5	30	15	6	9	47	33	51	Second round	
2009	1. divisjon		II	↑ 2	30	16	8	6	61	32	56	Third round	Promoted to Tippeligaen
2010	Tippeligaen		I	↓ 14	30	7	6	17	28	62	27	Fourth round	Relegated to 1. divisjon after losing the promotion/relegation play-offs to Fredrikstad
2011	1. divisjon		II	↑ 1	30	16	9	5	61	28	57	Fourth round	Promoted to Tippeligaen
2012	Tippeligaen		I	13	30	7	12	11	30	42	33	Third round	
2013	Tippeligaen		I	↓ 16	30	6	11	13	34	47	29	Third round	Relegated to 1. divisjon
2014	1. divisjon		II	11	30	12	4	14	39	55	40	Second round	
2015	1. divisjon		II	↓ 16	30	7	7	16	35	52	28	Fourth round	Relegated to 2. divisjon
2016	2. divisjon	2	III	3	26	12	6	8	49	35	42	Second round	
2017	2. divisjon	2	III	10	26	9	5	12	35	41	32	First round	
2018	2. divisjon	1	III	↓ 13	26	5	5	16	38	67	20	Second round	Relegated to 3. divisjon
2019	3. divisjon	6	IV	4	26	14	5	7	67	40	47	First round	
2020	Season cancelled												
2021	3. divisjon	2	IV	4	13	7	4	2	28	18	25	First round	
2022	3. divisjon	2	IV	7	26	11	4	11	56	46	37	First round	
2023	3. divisjon	2	IV	2	26	24	1	1	80	19	73	First round	
2024	3. divisjon	6	IV	↑ 1	26	24	2	0	117	17	74	Second round	Promoted to 2. divisjon
2025	2. divisjon	2	III	7	26	13	3	10	57	48	42	First round	
2026	2. divisjon	2	III									Second round	

== Current squad ==
As of 1 September 2026

Note: Flags indicate national team as defined under FIFA eligibility rules; some limited exceptions apply. Players may hold more than one non-FIFA nationality.

No.	Pos.	Nation	Player
1	GK	NOR	Martin Kjeverud Eggen
3	DF	NOR	Lars Rydje
4	DF	NOR	Stian Aarønes Holte
5	DF	NOR	Trace Murray
6	DF	NOR	Ola Heltne Nilsen
7	DF	NOR	Oskar Elias Wang
8	MF	NOR	Henrik Elvevold
9	FW	SWE	Hugo Benjamin Svensson
10	FW	NOR	Kristoffer Hoven
11	FW	CUB	Willian Pozo-Venta
14	DF	NOR	August Tuastad Randers
15	DF	NOR	Jon Øya (on loan from Stabæk)

No.	Pos.	Nation	Player
16	DF	NOR	Kristian Nøkleby-Karlsrud
17	MF	NOR	Torje Naustdal (on loan from Raufoss)
18	DF	NOR	Leo Kyvik
19	FW	NOR	Emil Øverby
20	FW	NOR	Alexander Gurendal (on loan from Stabæk)
21	FW	NOR	Simen Egge Nestaker
22	FW	NOR	Brage Berg Pedersen
23	MF	NOR	Sivert Nilsen Bukten
26	GK	NOR	Jonatan Strand Byttingsvik
28	FW	NOR	Ibrahim Sawaneh
30	MF	NOR	Petter Hokstad
95	DF	UKR	Artem Nahirnyi

== Managers ==
Name	Year(s)
(Norway) Ole Asbjørn Underdal	1987
(Norway) Per Ulseth	1987–88
(Norway) Terje Liknes	1989–91
(Norway) Kjell Ramberg	1992
(Norway) Terje Liknes	1993
(Norway) Paul Berg	1994–96
(Norway) Roy Arild Fossum	1997–00
(Norway) Lars Tjærnås	2000
(Norway) Per Brogeland	2001
(Norway) Lars Tjærnås	2002–03
(Sweden) Peter Engelbrektsson	2004–06
(Norway) Kjell Sverre Hansen Wold	2007
(Norway) Ole Bjørn Sundgot	2008–10
(Norway) Reidar Vågnes	2010
(Norway) Leif Gunnar Smerud	2011–13
(Norway) Roar Johansen	2013–14
(Norway) Rune Skarsfjord	2014–15
(Denmark) René Skovdahl	2016
(Norway) Frode Lafton	2016–18
(Norway) Tor Thodesen	2018
(England) Luke Torjussen	2019–22
(Iceland) Marko Valdimar Jankovic	2022
(Finland) Mika Pulkkinen	2022
(Norway) Gunnar Halle	2023–present

== Women's team ==
Hønefoss also has a women's team, which currently competes in the Toppserien, the top division of women's football in Norway.
