= 2013 Hønefoss BK season =

Hønefoss
2013 season
- Chairman: Bjørn Aasen
- Manager: Leif Gunnar Smerud
- Stadium: Aka Arena
- Tippeligaen: 16th (relegated)
- Norwegian Cup: Third Round vs Alta
- Top goalscorer: League: Riku Riski (10); All: Riku Riski (11)
- Highest home attendance: 3,431 vs Rosenborg; 13 May 2013
- Lowest home attendance: 2,214 vs Sogndal; 3 November 2013
- Average home league attendance: 2,718
Home colours	Away colours

In 2013 Hønefoss BK played their second consecutive season in the Tippeligaen and their third season in the top flight of Norwegian football. Hønefoss finished bottom of the league, and therefore were relegated to the Adeccoligaen, whilst they reached the Third Round of the Cup losing to Alta of the 2. divisjon.

== Squad ==
As of 27 August 2013

Note: Flags indicate national team as defined under FIFA eligibility rules; some limited exceptions apply. Players may hold more than one non-FIFA nationality.

No.	Pos.	Nation	Player
1	GK	NOR	Lars Stutterud
3	MF	NOR	Simon Larsen (on loan from Vålerenga)
4	MF	NOR	Helge Haugen
5	DF	NOR	Aleksander Solli
6	DF	ISL	Kristjan Örn Sigurdsson
7	MF	DEN	Mikkel Vendelbo
8	DF	NOR	Kevin Larsen
9	MF	NOR	Mats André Kaland
10	MF	FIN	Riku Riski
11	FW	NOR	Erik Midtgarden
13	MF	FIN	Toni Kolehmainen
16	MF	NOR	Tor Øyvind Hovda

No.	Pos.	Nation	Player
19	FW	NOR	Øyvind Hoås
20	FW	NOR	Alexander Mathisen
21	FW	SEN	Remond Mendy
22	DF	ISL	Arnór Aðalsteinsson
23	DF	NOR	Alexander Groven
24	FW	NOR	Kenneth Di Vita Jensen
26	GK	USA	Steve Clark
28	DF	NOR	Martin Nygaard
30	FW	NOR	Sigurd Svendsen
31	FW	NOR	Martin Thomassen
32	FW	NOR	Ole Petter Berget
84	GK	NOR	Magnus Hjulstad

=== On Loan ===
Note: Flags indicate national team as defined under FIFA eligibility rules; some limited exceptions apply. Players may hold more than one non-FIFA nationality.

No. / Pos. / Nation / Player; 27 / FW / CIV / Kevin Beugré (loan to Mjøndalen)	No. / Pos. / Nation / Player

== Transfers ==
=== Winter ===
In: Note: Flags indicate national team as defined under FIFA eligibility rules; some limited exceptions apply. Players may hold more than one non-FIFA nationality.

No.	Pos.	Nation	Player
3	MF	NOR	Pål Erik Ulvestad (loan from (Norway) Molde)
5	DF	NOR	Aleksander Solli (from (Norway) Vålerenga)
11	FW	NOR	Erik Midtgarden (from (Norway) Lillestrøm)
20	DF	NOR	Alexander Mathisen (from (Belgium) Lierse)

Out: Note: Flags indicate national team as defined under FIFA eligibility rules; some limited exceptions apply. Players may hold more than one non-FIFA nationality.

No.	Pos.	Nation	Player
1	GK	NOR	Lars Stubhaug (Retired)
5	DF	NOR	Vegar Gjermundstad (to (Norway) Førde)
11	FW	NOR	Joachim Magnussen
17	MF	NOR	Leo Olsen (to (Norway) Jevnaker)
18	MF	NOR	Rune Bolseth
20	MF	NOR	Mats André Kaland

=== Summer ===
In: Note: Flags indicate national team as defined under FIFA eligibility rules; some limited exceptions apply. Players may hold more than one non-FIFA nationality.

No.	Pos.	Nation	Player
3	MF	NOR	Simon Larsen (on loan from (Norway) Vålerenga)
19	FW	NOR	Øyvind Hoås (from (Norway) Sarpsborg 08)

Out: Note: Flags indicate national team as defined under FIFA eligibility rules; some limited exceptions apply. Players may hold more than one non-FIFA nationality.

No.	Pos.	Nation	Player
2	DF	NOR	Frode Lafton (Retired)
3	MF	NOR	Pål Erik Ulvestad (loan return to (Norway) Molde)
14	DF	CRC	Heiner Mora (to (Costa Rica) A.D. Belén)
27	FW	CIV	Kevin Beugré (loan to (Norway) Mjøndalen)

== Competitions ==
=== Tippeligaen ===
==== Results summary ====
Overall								Home						Away					
Pld	W	D	L	GF	GA	GD	Pts	W	D	L	GF	GA	GD	W	D	L	GF	GA	GD
30	6	11	13	36	47	−11	29	4	4	7	18	20	−2	2	7	6	18	27	−9

Last updated: 13 November 2013.
Source: see below

==== Results by round ====
Round	1	2	3	4	5	6	7	8	9	10	11	12	13	14	15	16	17	18	19	20	21	22	23	24	25	26	27	28	29	30
Ground	A	H	A	H	A	A	H	A	H	A	H	A	H	A	H	H	A	H	A	H	H	A	H	A	H	A	H	A	H	A
Result	L	W	L	L	D	D	D	W	L	D	W	L	D	D	D	L	L	L	L	L	W	D	L	W	D	D	L	D	W	L
Position	11	6	10	13	13	13	15	10	11	13	9	11	11	11	13	14	15	15	16	16	14	15	15	15	15	15	16	16	16	16

Updated to match(es) played on 13 November 2013. Source: see below
A = Away; H = Home; W = Win; D = Draw; L = Loss

==== Matches ====
17 March 2013 1	Start	3–2	Hønefoss	Kristiansand
18:00 CET (UTC+1)	Mathisen 13' (yellow card) 28'; Vilhjálmsson 23'; Hoff 33' (pen.)	Summary	Mats André Kaland 54'; Riski (yellow card) 55'; Mora 63'; Groven (yellow card) 75'	Stadium: Sør Arena; Attendance: 4,729; Referee: Dag Hafsås

2 April 2013 2	Hønefoss	2–0	Strømsgodset	Hønefoss
18:30 CEST (UTC+2)	Sigurðsson (yellow card) 44'; Riski 81'; Aleksander Solli 90'	Summary	Johansen (yellow card) 64'; Ibrahim (yellow card) 72'; Madsen (red card) 79'	Stadium: Aka Arena; Attendance: 2,645; Referee: Trond Døvle

7 April 2013 3	Aalesund	4–3	Hønefoss	Ålesund
18:00 CEST (UTC+2)	Barrantes 6'; James 15'; Larsen 60'; Phillips 66'	Summary	Remond Mendy 20'; Groven (yellow card) 24'; Larsen 33' (yellow card) 59'; Riski 50'; Vendelbo (yellow card) 78'	Stadium: Color Line Stadion; Attendance: 8,362; Referee: Svein Moen

14 April 2013 4	Hønefoss	0–1	Haugesund	Hønefoss
18:00 CEST (UTC+2)		Summary	Gytkjær 84'	Stadium: Aka Arena; Attendance: 2,247; Referee: Trygve Kjensli

21 April 2013 5	Sandnes Ulf	1–1	Hønefoss	Sandnes
18:00 CEST (UTC+2)	Holmvik 43'; Høiland (yellow card) 60'; Frejd (yellow card) 87'	Summary	Haugen (yellow card) 42'; Riku Riski (yellow card) 52'; Remond Mendy (yellow card) 75'; Aleksander Solli 88'	Stadium: Sandnes Idrettspark; Attendance: 3,090; Referee: Dag Hafsås

28 April 2013 6	Sarpsborg 08	1–1	Hønefoss	Sarpsborg
18:00 CEST (UTC+2)	Wiig 38'	Summary	Riski 74'	Stadium: Sarpsborg Stadion; Attendance: 3,684; Referee: Tom Harald Hagen

5 May 2013 7	Hønefoss	1–1	Tromsø	Hønefoss
18:00 CEST (UTC+2)	Vendelbo 62'	Summary	Moldskred 54'	Stadium: Aka Arena; Attendance: 2,668; Referee: Omar Rafiq

8 May 2013 8	Vålerenga	1–2	Hønefoss	Oslo
19:00 CEST (UTC+2)	González 63'	Summary	Vendelbo 44'; Solli 88'	Stadium: Ullevaal Stadion; Attendance: 8,136; Referee: Tore Hansen

13 May 2013 9	Hønefoss	1–2	Rosenborg	Hønefoss
19:00 CET (UTC+1)	Kaland 50'	Summary	Nielsen 31'; Elyounoussi 43'	Stadium: Aka Arena; Attendance: 3,431; Referee: Brage Sandmoen

16 May 2013 10	Viking	0–0	Hønefoss	Stavanger
18:00 CEST (UTC+2)		Summary		Stadium: Viking Stadion; Attendance: 11,742; Referee: Tore Hansen

21 May 2013 11	Hønefoss	1–0	Lillestrøm	Hønefoss
18:00 CEST (UTC+2)	Kaland 50'	Summary		Stadium: Aka Arena; Attendance: 2,623; Referee: Kjetil Sælen

25 May 2013 12	Molde	4–0	Hønefoss	Molde
15:30 CEST (UTC+2)	Chima 12', 60'; Eikrem 51'; Tripić 55'	Summary		Stadium: Aker Stadion; Attendance: 8,168; Referee: Trond Ivar Døvle

23 June 2013 13	Hønefoss	1–1	Odd	Hønefoss
18:00 CEST (UTC+2)	Mathisen 48'	Summary	Shala 63' (pen.)	Stadium: Aka Arena; Attendance: 2,564; Referee: Ken Henry Johnsen

29 June 2013 14	Sogndal	1–1	Hønefoss	Sogndalsfjøra
20:05 CEST (UTC+2)	Bolseth 26'	Summary	Riski 43'	Stadium: Fosshaugane Campus; Attendance: 4,581; Referee: Per Ivar Staberg

8 July 2013 15	Hønefoss	1–1	Brann	Hønefoss
19:00 CEST (UTC+2)	Kaland 16'	Summary	Huseklepp 7'	Stadium: Aka Arena; Attendance: 3,076; Referee: Tom Harald Hagen

12 July 2013 16	Hønefoss	1–2	Vålerenga	Hønefoss
19:00 CEST (UTC+2)	Ulvestad (red card) 4'; Riski 45' (pen.); Groven (yellow card) 75'	Summary	Solli 41'; Berre 61'; Grindheim (yellow card) 88'	Stadium: Aka Arena; Attendance: 3,241; Referee: Dag Hafsås

28 July 2013 17	Strømsgodset	6–1	Hønefoss	Drammen
15:30 CEST (UTC+2)	Kamara 2', 30', 90+2'; Storflor 24'; Sigurdsson 28' (o.g.); Kovács 70'	Summary	Riski 22'	Stadium: Marienlyst Stadion; Attendance: 5,628; Referee: Per Ivar Staberg

4 August 2013 18	Hønefoss	2–5	Aalesund	Hønefoss
18:00 CEST (UTC+2)	Solli 55', 80'	Summary	Barrantes 13'; Matland 20'; Hamdallah 21'; James 35'; Larsen 90+6'	Stadium: Aka Arena; Attendance: 2,568; Referee: Svein Oddvar Moen

11 August 2013 19	Haugesund	1–0	Hønefoss	Haugesund
18:00 CEST (UTC+2)	Gytkjær 12'	Summary	Hoås (yellow card) 45+2' (yellow-red card) 53'	Stadium: Haugesund Stadion; Attendance: 4,686; Referee: Tore Hansen

18 August 2013 20	Hønefoss	0–1	Sandnes Ulf	Hønefoss
18:00 CEST (UTC+2)		Summary	Haugen 62' (o.g.)	Stadium: Aka Arena; Attendance: 2,183; Referee: Svein Erik Edvartsen

25 August 2013 21	Hønefoss	3–1	Sarpsborg 08	Hønefoss
18:00 CEST (UTC+2)	Riski 51'; Hovda 87'; Vendelbo 88'	Summary	Wiig 11'	Stadium: Aka Arena; Attendance: 2,882; Referee: Omar Rafiq

1 September 2013 22	Tromsø	1–1	Hønefoss	Tromsø
18:00 CEST (UTC+2)	Norbye (yellow card) 42'; Drage 72'	Summary	Haugen (yellow card) 18'; Midtgarden (yellow card) 31'; Hoås (yellow card) 51'; Tor Øyvind Hovda (yellow card) 70'; Riku Riski 88'	Stadium: Alfheim Stadion; Attendance: 3,964; Referee: Trygve Kjensli

15 September 2013 23	Hønefoss	0–1	Start	Hønefoss
18:00 CEST (UTC+2)		Summary	Heikkinen 50'	Stadium: Aka Arena; Attendance: 2,909; Referee: Tom Harald Hagen

21 September 2013 24	Lillestrøm	1–2	Hønefoss	Lillestrøm
15:30 CEST (UTC+2)	Kippe 15'	Summary	Vendelbo 51'; Riski 54'	Stadium: Åråsen Stadion; Attendance: 4,052; Referee: Svein Erik Edvartsen

28 September 2013 25	Hønefoss	2–2	Viking	Hønefoss
15:30 CEST (UTC+2)	K.Sigurdsson 82'; Hovda 90+2'	Summary	I.Sigurðsson 36'; Ingelsten 59' (pen.)	Stadium: Aka Arena; Attendance: 2,638; Referee: Trond Ivar Døvle

6 October 2013 26	Rosenborg	0–0	Hønefoss	Trondheim
19:00 CET (UTC+1)		Summary		Stadium: Lerkendal Stadion; Attendance: 12,058; Referee: Trygve Kjensli

20 October 2013 27	Hønefoss	0–1	Molde	Hønefoss
15:30 CEST (UTC+2)		Summary	Chima 54'	Stadium: Aka Arena; Attendance: 2,876; Referee: Ken Henry Johnsen

27 October 2013 28	Brann	0–0	Hønefoss	Bergen
18:00 CET (UTC+1)		Summary		Stadium: Brann Stadion; Attendance: 9,348; Referee: Omar Rafiq

3 November 2013 29	Hønefoss	3–1	Sogndal	Hønefoss
18:00 CET (UTC+1)	Haugen 55'; Mathisen 57'; Riski 68'	Summary	Stamnestrø 61'	Stadium: Aka Arena; Attendance: 2,214; Referee: Espen Berntsen

10 November 2013 30	Odd	3–2	Hønefoss	Skien
18:00 CET (UTC+1)	Clark 33' (o.g.); Shala 74'; Johnsen 81'	Summary	Hovda 8'; Mathisen 56'	Stadium: Skagerak Arena; Attendance: 5,190; Referee: Brage Sandmoen

==== Table ====
Pos	Team	Pld	W	D	L	GF	GA	GD	Pts	Qualification or relegation
12	Sogndal	30	8	9	13	33	48	−15	33	
13	Sandnes Ulf	30	9	6	15	36	58	−22	33	
14	Sarpsborg 08 (O)	30	8	7	15	40	58	−18	31	Qualification for the relegation play-offs
15	Tromsø (R)	30	7	8	15	41	50	−9	29	Europa League qualifying and relegation to First Division (Note: Norway was among the best three associations in the UEFA Fair Play ranking and thus received an additional spot in the first qualifying round of the Europa League, Tromsø IL received the qualifying spot for their ranking in Tippeligaen's Fair Play ranking.)
16	Hønefoss (R)	30	6	11	13	34	47	−13	29	Relegation to First Division

Source: fotball.no
Rules for classification: 1) points; 2) goal difference; 3) number of goals scored.
(O) Play-off winners; (R) Relegated

=== Norwegian Cup ===
17 April 2013 First Round	Holmen	0–3	Brann	Holmen
18:00 CEST (UTC+2)		Summary	Larsen 13'; Mora 27' di Vita Jensen 42'	Stadium: Holmen gress Attendance: 587; Referee: Kristian Randen

1 May 2013 Second Round	Birkebeineren	1–1 (a.e.t.) (2–4 p)	Hønefoss	Krokstadelva
18:00 CEST (UTC+2)	Avdimetaj 36'	Report	Riski 54'	Stadium: Årbogen Kunstgress; Attendance: 400; Referee: Richard Isaksen
	Penalties
	Ryghseter (penalty scored); Peyghambernejad (penalty missed); Celina (penalty scored); Torgersen (penalty missed); Ekholdt (penalty missed)		(penalty scored) Riski; (penalty scored) Vendelbo; (penalty scored) Solli; (penalty scored) Midtgarden

29 May 2013 Third Round	Alta	2–1	Hønefoss	Finnmarkshallen
18:00 CEST (UTC+2)	Ngom 2'; Balto 86'	Summary	Aðalsteinsson 87'	Stadium: Alta Idrettspark; Attendance: 561; Referee: Trygve Kjensli

== Squad statistics ==
As of 13 November 2013

=== Appearances and goals ===
No.	Pos	Nat	Player	Total		Tippeligaen		Norwegian Cup	
No.	Pos	Nat	Player	Apps	Goals	Apps	Goals	Apps	Goals
3	DF	(Norway) NOR	Simon Larsen	10	0	10+0	0	0+0	0
4	MF	(Norway) NOR	Helge Haugen	29	0	22+4	0	3+0	0
5	DF	(Norway) NOR	Aleksander Solli	32	5	28+1	5	3+0	0
6	DF	(Iceland) ISL	Kristjan Örn Sigurdsson	26	0	23+2	0	1+0	0
7	MF	(Denmark) DEN	Mikkel Vendelbo	32	3	29+0	3	3+0	0
8	DF	(Norway) NOR	Kevin Larsen	30	2	23+4	1	3+0	1
9	MF	(Norway) NOR	Mats André Kaland	29	4	19+8	4	2+0	0
10	MF	(Finland) FIN	Riku Riski	31	11	29+0	10	2+0	1
11	FW	(Norway) NOR	Erik Midtgarden	22	0	3+16	0	1+2	0
13	MF	(Finland) FIN	Toni Kolehmainen	14	0	8+6	0	0+0	0
16	MF	(Norway) NOR	Tor Øyvind Hovda	25	1	24+1	1	0+0	0
19	FW	(Norway) NOR	Øyvind Hoås	9	0	6+3	0	0+0	0
20	FW	(Norway) NOR	Alexander Mathisen	20	1	13+7	1	0+0	0
21	FW	(Senegal) SEN	Remond Mendy	24	1	11+12	1	1+0	0
22	DF	(Iceland) ISL	Arnór Aðalsteinsson	14	1	9+2	0	3+0	1
23	DF	(Norway) NOR	Alexander Groven	26	0	24+0	0	2+0	0
24	FW	(Norway) NOR	Kenneth Di Vita Jensen	17	1	7+8	0	1+1	1
26	GK	(United States) USA	Steve Clark	33	0	30+0	0	3+0	0
30	DF	(Norway) NOR	Sigurd Svendsen	1	0	0+1	0	0+0	0
31	FW	(Norway) NOR	Martin Thomassen	3	0	0+2	0	0+1	0
32	FW	(Norway) NOR	Ole Petter Berget	2	0	0+1	0	0+1	0
Players away from Hønefoss on loan:
27	FW	(Ivory Coast) CIV	Kevin Beugré	5	0	0+3	0	1+1	0
Players who appeared for Hønefoss no longer at the club:
2	DF	(Norway) NOR	Frode Lafton	2	0	2+0	0	0+0	0
3	MF	(Norway) NOR	Pål Erik Ulvestad	9	0	4+3	0	2+0	0
14	DF	(Costa Rica) CRC	Heiner Mora	10	2	8+0	1	2+0	1

=== Goal scorers ===
Place	Position	Nation	Number	Name	Tippeligaen	Norwegian Cup	Total
1	MF	(Finland)	10	Riku Riski	10	1	11
2	DF	(Norway)	5	Aleksander Solli	5	0	5
3	MF	(Norway)	9	Mats André Kaland	4	0	4
4	MF	(Denmark)	7	Mikkel Vendelbo	4	0	4
5	MF	(Norway)	16	Tor Øyvind Hovda	3	0	3
5	FW	(Norway)	20	Alexander Mathisen	3	0	3
7	DF	(Norway)	8	Kevin Larsen	1	1	2
7	DF	(Costa Rica)	14	Heiner Mora	1	1	2
9	FW	(Senegal)	21	Remond Mendy	1	0	1
9	DF	(Iceland)	6	Kristjan Örn Sigurdsson	1	0	1
9				Own goal	1	0	1
9	FW	(Norway)	24	Kenneth Di Vita Jensen	0	1	1
9	DF	(Iceland)	22	Arnór Aðalsteinsson	0	1	1
				TOTALS	34	5	39

=== Disciplinary record ===
Number	Nation	Position	Name	Tippeligaen		Norwegian Cup		Total	
Number	Nation	Position	Name	Yellow card	Red card	Yellow card	Red card	Yellow card	Red card
3	(Norway)	MF	Pål Erik Ulvestad	2	1	0	0	2	1
3	(Norway)	DF	Simon Larsen	1	0	0	0	1	0
4	(Norway)	MF	Helge Haugen	6	0	1	0	7	0
6	(Iceland)	DF	Kristjan Örn Sigurdsson	3	0	0	0	3	0
7	(Denmark)	DF	Mikkel Vendelbo	3	0	1	0	4	0
8	(Norway)	DF	Kevin Larsen	2	0	1	0	3	0
10	(Finland)	MF	Riku Riski	4	0	0	0	4	0
11	(Norway)	FW	Erik Midtgarden	2	0	0	0	2	0
14	(Costa Rica)	DF	Heiner Mora	1	0	0	0	1	0
16	(Norway)	MF	Tor Øyvind Hovda	2	0	0	0	2	0
19	(Norway)	FW	Øyvind Hoås	5	1	0	0	5	1
20	(Norway)	FW	Alexander Mathisen	2	0	0	0	2	0
21	(Senegal)	FW	Remond Mendy	3	0	0	0	3	0
22	(Iceland)	DF	Arnór Aðalsteinsson	2	0	1	0	3	0
23	(Norway)	DF	Alexander Groven	4	0	1	0	5	0
26	(United States)	GK	Steve Clark	2	0	0	0	2	0
			TOTALS	44	2	5	0	49	2
