= Beugré =

Beugré is a surname. Notable people with the surname include:

- Kevin Beugré (born 1992), Ivorian footballer
- Eugène Beugré Yago (born 1969), Ivorian footballer
- Robert Beugré Mambé (born 1952), Ivorian politician
