= Kenneth Di Vita Jensen =

Norwegian soccer player (born 1990)

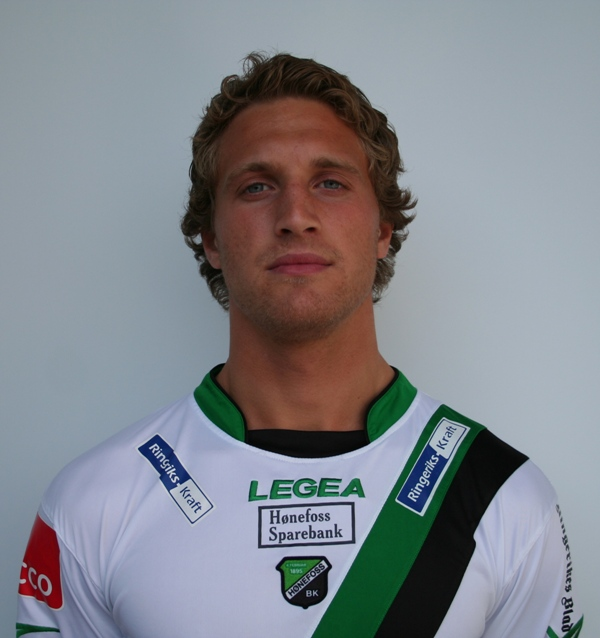

Personal information
- Date of birth: 22 July 1990 (age 36)
- Place of birth: Hønefoss, Norway
- Height: 1.89 m (6 ft 2 1/2 in)
- Position: Forward

Team information
- Current team: Gamle Oslo

Youth career
- Hønefoss

Senior career*
Years	Team	Apps	(Gls)
2006–2013	Hønefoss	77	(8)
2009	→ Jevnaker (loan)		
2012	→ Ull/Kisa (loan)	13	(2)
2014	Moss	10	(6)
2014	Jevnaker	12	(13)
2015	Lommedalen	8	(11)
2015	Fredrikstad	11	(1)
2016	Ullern	21	(5)
2017	KFUM Oslo	5	(1)
2018–	Gamle Oslo		
- * Club domestic league appearances and goals as of 8 August 2017

Kenneth Di Vita Jensen (born 22 July 1990) is a Norwegian soccer player of American descent, who is playing as a forward. He notably played for Tippeligaen club Hønefoss.

== Career ==
Di Vita Jensen hails from Hole and joined Hønefoss BK in 2006 as a youth player. In 2007 and 2008 he played sporadically in the Adeccoligaen and scored a goal against Alta IF, but his playing time was limited by injuries and his youthful inexperience. In 2009, he went on loan to Jevnaker in the Norwegian Third Division where he became the club's leading scorer.

Hønefoss was promoted to the Tippeligaen after the 2009 season and Di Vita Jensen played an increased role in the team during their top flight campaign.

In 2014, he joined Moss FK, only to play the autumn part of the season for Jevnaker. He scored 13 goals in 12 games here, but left after half a season to play in closer proximity to the Oslo and Akershus University College where he studied. In 2015, he joined Lommedalens IL. His career here became equally short, as he went on to Fredrikstad FK in the summer. Playing just half a year here as well, he signed for Ullern IF ahead of the 2016 season.

== International ==
Di Vita Jensen has appeared for Norway's U-16 and U-17 teams. He is also eligible for the US through his American mother.

== Career statistics ==
As of 21 September 2013

Season	Club	Division	League		Cup		Total	
Season	Club	Division	Apps	Goals	Apps	Goals	Apps	Goals
2006	Hønefoss	Adeccoligaen	1	0	0	0	1	0
2007	Hønefoss	Adeccoligaen	9	0	0	0	9	0
2008	Hønefoss	Adeccoligaen	8	1	0	0	8	1
2009	Hønefoss	Adeccoligaen	0	0	0	0	0	0
2009	Jevnaker IF	Third Division						
2010	Hønefoss	Tippeligaen	19	2	3	0	22	2
2011	Hønefoss	Adeccoligaen	16	5	3	2	19	7
2012	Hønefoss	Tippeligaen	9	0	2	0	11	0
2012	Ull/Kisa	Adeccoligaen	13	2	0	0	13	2
2013	Hønefoss	Tippeligaen	15	0	2	1	17	1
Career Total			90	10	10	3	100	13
