= Aka Arena =

Football stadium in Hønefoss, Norway

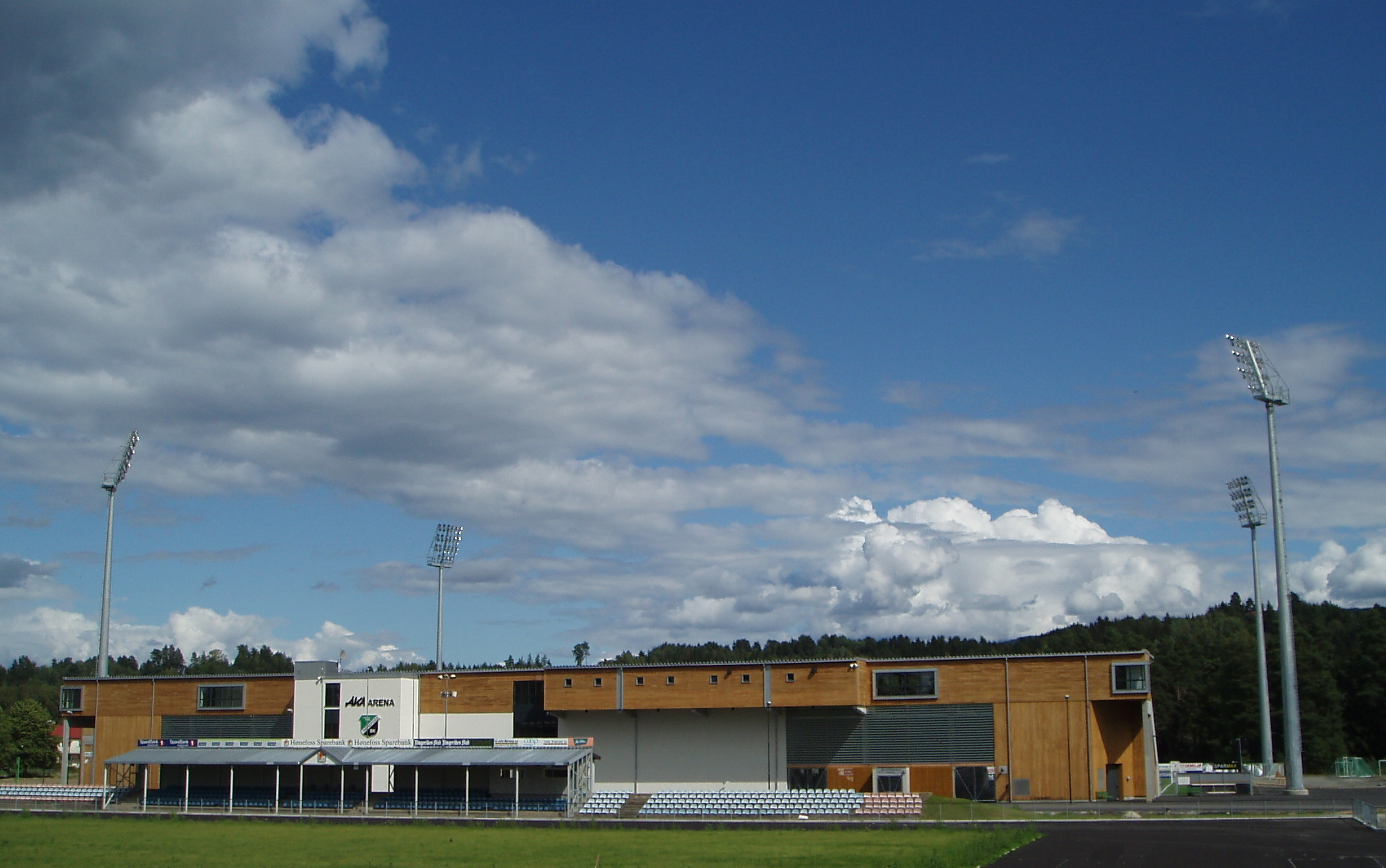
- Interactive map of Aka Arena
- Former names: Hønefoss Stadion
- Location: Hønefoss, Norway
- Coordinates: 60.1591°N 10.2654°E
- Owner: Hønefoss Stadion AS
- Operator: Hønefoss BK
- Capacity: 4,120 (seating - 3,500)
- Surface: Artificial grass
- Field size: 105 × 68 m

Construction
- Opened: 1949
- Renovated: 2009

Tenant
- Hønefoss BK (football)

Aka Arena, formerly known as Hønefoss Stadion, is a football stadium in Hønefoss, Norway, and is the home of former Norwegian top division, currently 3. divisjon club Hønefoss. The stadium has a capacity of approx. 4,120 spectators.

A record attendance of 3,747 was set during the last match of the 2009 First Division season against Sogndal, when Hønefoss got promoted to the top division. A new record was set on 25 May 2010 when 4,245 saw Hønefoss beat SK Brann 2–0, whilst another new record was set on 19 May 2012 when 4,246 attended a match against Vålerenga.

The venue has hosted Norway national under-21 football team matches three times, playing 0–0 against Yugoslavia on 8 June 1975, 5–1 against Turkey on 27 April 1993 and 2–1 against Greece on 3 September 1999. In a 2012 survey carried out by the Norwegian Players' Association among away-team captains, Aka was ranked lowest amongst league stadiums, with a score of 1.93 on a scale from one to five.

== Hønefoss Idrettspark ==
The stadium is a part of Hønefoss Idrettspark, where track and field club Ringerike Friidrettsklubb has a 400 m rubber track in alignment with the IAAF standard. The facilities also includes Sjongshallen, an ice hockey field.
