= Frode Lafton =

Norwegian footballer (born 1976)

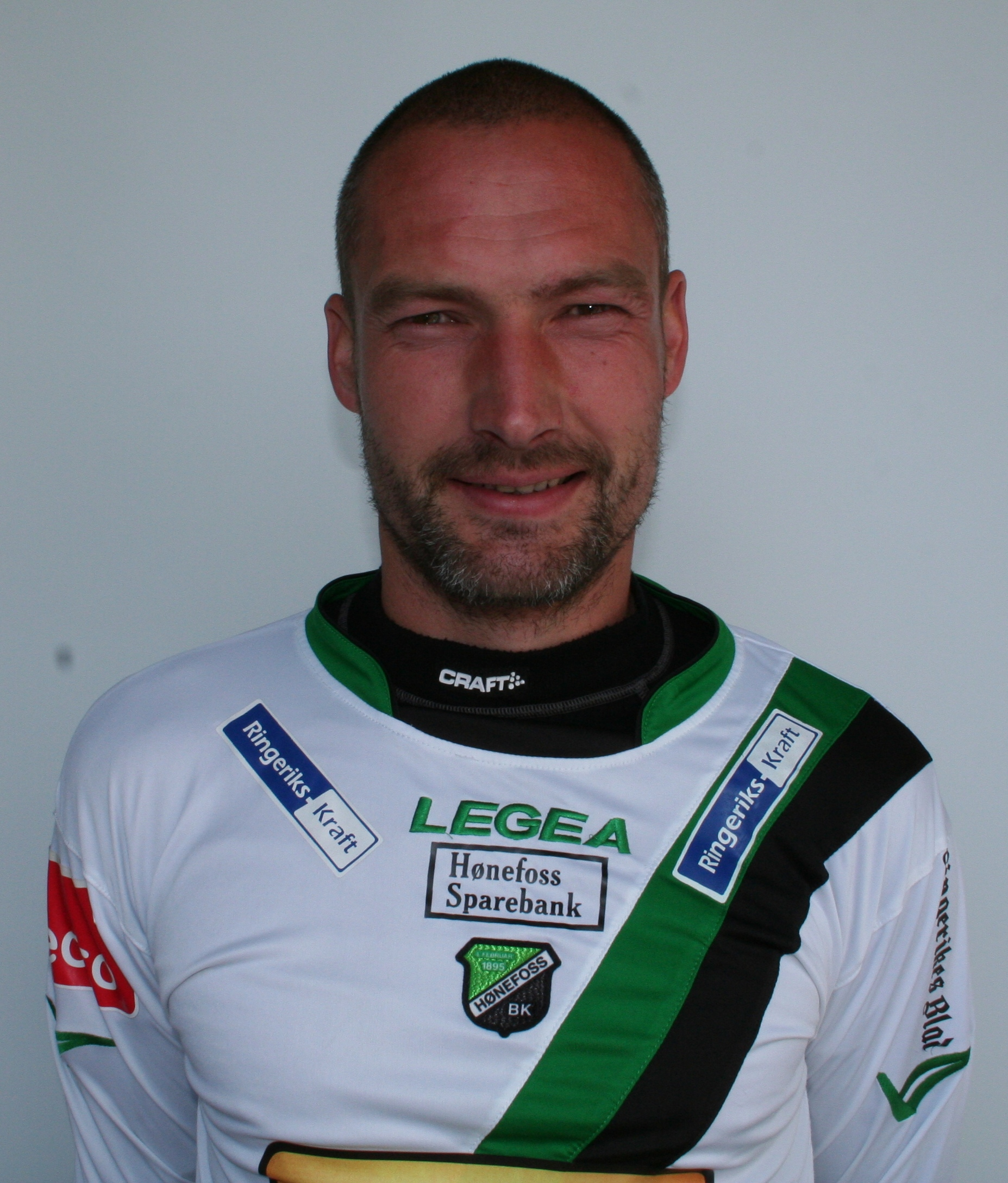

Personal information
- Date of birth: 3 March 1976 (age 50)
- Place of birth: Hønefoss, Norway
- Height: 1.83 m (6 ft 0 in)
- Position: Defender

Senior career*
Years	Team	Apps	(Gls)
1994–2013	Hønefoss	523	(19)
Total		523	(19)

Managerial career
- 2016–2018: Hønefoss
- * Club domestic league appearances and goals as of 5 March 2021

Frode Lafton (born 3 March 1976) is a Norwegian former footballer who played as a defender for Hønefoss throughout his career. He was also the club's captain. On 9 May 2013 he retired from football cause a knee injury he not recovered from. On 17 August 2016 he took over Hønefoss as manager.

== See also ==
- List of one-club men in association football
