= Mikkel Vendelbo =

Danish footballer (born 1987)

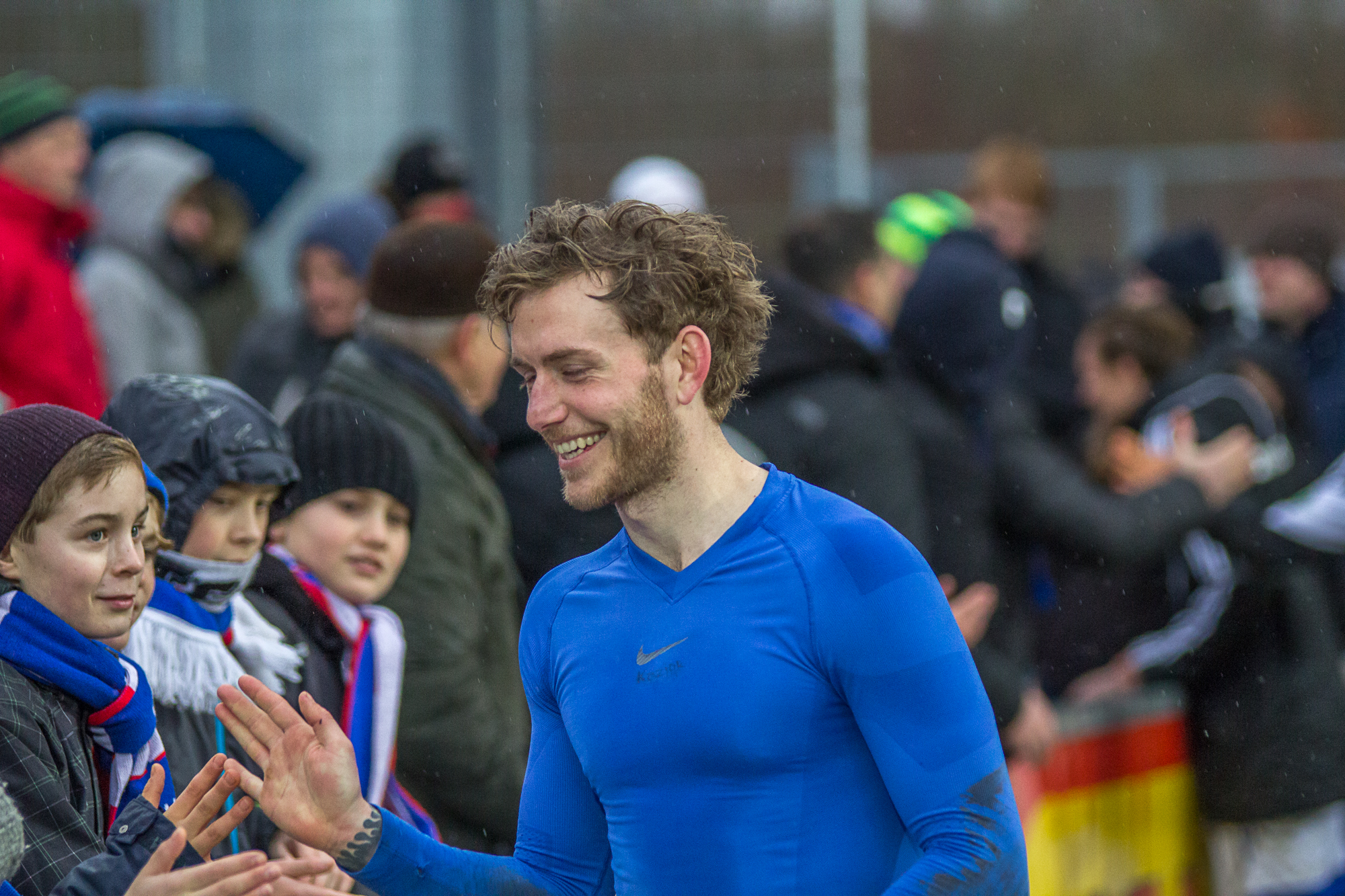

Personal information
- Date of birth: 15 August 1987 (age 39)
- Place of birth: Esbjerg, Denmark
- Height: 1.85 m (6 ft 1 in)
- Position: Midfielder

Youth career
- –2004: AGF
- 2004–2005: Esbjerg fB

Senior career*
Years	Team	Apps	(Gls)
2005–2012	Esbjerg fB	128	(17)
2012–2014	Hønefoss	39	(5)
2014–2015	Holstein Kiel	53	(2)
2014	→ Holstein Kiel II	1	(0)
2015–2019	Silkeborg IF	96	(3)
2019–2021	Skive IK	22	(3)

International career
2006	Denmark U19	3	(0)
- * Club domestic league appearances and goals as of 17:26, 13 January 2021 (UTC)

Mikkel Vendelbo (born 15 August 1987) is a Danish professional footballer who plays as a midfielder.
