= Mats André Kaland =

Norwegian footballer (born 1989)

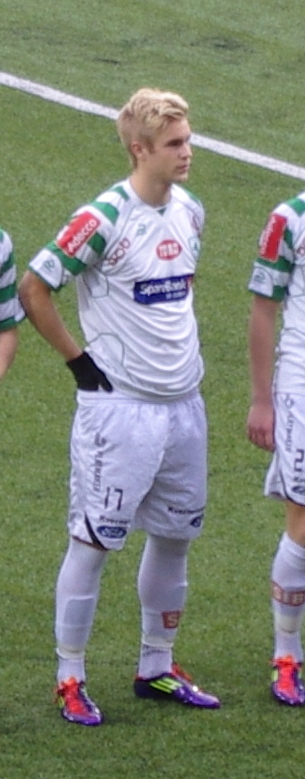

Personal information
- Date of birth: 9 May 1989 (age 37)
- Place of birth: Bergen, Norway
- Height: 1.84 m (6 ft 0 in)
- Position: Right midfielder

Team information
- Current team: Skeid

Youth career
- Frøya
- Fyllingen
- Lyngbø

Senior career*
Years	Team	Apps	(Gls)
–2009	Lyngbø		
2010–2011	Løv-Ham	52	(5)
2012–2014	Hønefoss	73	(9)
2015	Varberg	30	(6)
2016–2017	Fredrikstad	13	(0)
2016	→ Varberg (loan)	13	(1)
2017–2018	Ull/Kisa	47	(2)
2019–2021	Strømmen	73	(4)
2022	Ull/Kisa 2	3	(0)

Managerial career
- 2022–2023: Ullensaker/Kisa (assistant)
- 2023: Ullensaker/Kisa
- 2024–: Skeid (assistant)
- * Club domestic league appearances and goals

Mats André Kaland (born 9 May 1989) is a Norwegian retired footballer and manager.

== Club career ==
Kaland was born in Bergen. He played in the Third Division for Lyngbø. He made his debut for Løv-Ham on 5 April 2010 in the 2–1 victory over Sarpsborg 08.

Before the 2012 season he signed a contract with Hønefoss. He got his debut in a 0–0 draw against Lillestrøm on 24 March 2012. He scored his first goal for Hønefoss against Vålerenga on 19 May 2012; the only goal in the match.

After 2014 season he left the Hønefoss, he later signed with Swedish side Varbergs BoIS for one year. January 2016 he signed a two-year contract with Fredrikstad FK. In Fredrikstad he struggled to get playing time, and he returned to Varberg on loan for the remainder of the 2016-season.

In July 2017 he signed a contract with Ullensaker/Kisa He left the club at the end of 2018.

== Career statistics ==
As of 16 May 2021

Season	Club	Division	League		Cup		Total	
Season	Club	Division	Apps	Goals	Apps	Goals	Apps	Goals
2010	Løv-Ham	1. divisjon	25	1	2	0	27	1
2011	Løv-Ham	1. divisjon	27	4	1	0	28	4
2012	Hønefoss	Tippeligaen	20	3	2	1	22	4
2013	Hønefoss	Tippeligaen	27	4	2	0	29	4
2014	Hønefoss	1. divisjon	26	2	1	0	27	2
2015	Varbergs BoIS	Superettan	30	6	2	0	32	6
2016	Fredrikstad	1. divisjon	7	0	3	0	10	0
2016	Varbergs BoIS	Superettan	13	1	1	0	14	1
2017	Fredrikstad	1. divisjon	6	0	1	0	7	0
2017	Ullensaker/Kisa	1. divisjon	15	2	0	0	15	2
2018	Ullensaker/Kisa	1. divisjon	30	0	4	0	34	0
2019	Strømmen IF	1. divisjon	27	2	4	0	31	2
2020	Strømmen IF	1. divisjon	26	2	–		26	2
2021	Strømmen IF	1. divisjon	1	0	0	0	1	0
Career Total			280	27	23	1	303	28

== Manager career ==
Kaland started his manager career as assistant manager for Steffen Landro at Ull/Kisa in 2022. When Landro was sacked in the summer of 2023, Kaland was promoted to manager. He did not steer Ull/Kisa to promotion from the 2023 2. divisjon, and left after the season. In January 2024 he was announced as the assistant manager to Vilde Rislaa in newly relegated Second Division club Skeid.
