= Aleksander Solli =

Norwegian footballer (born 1990)

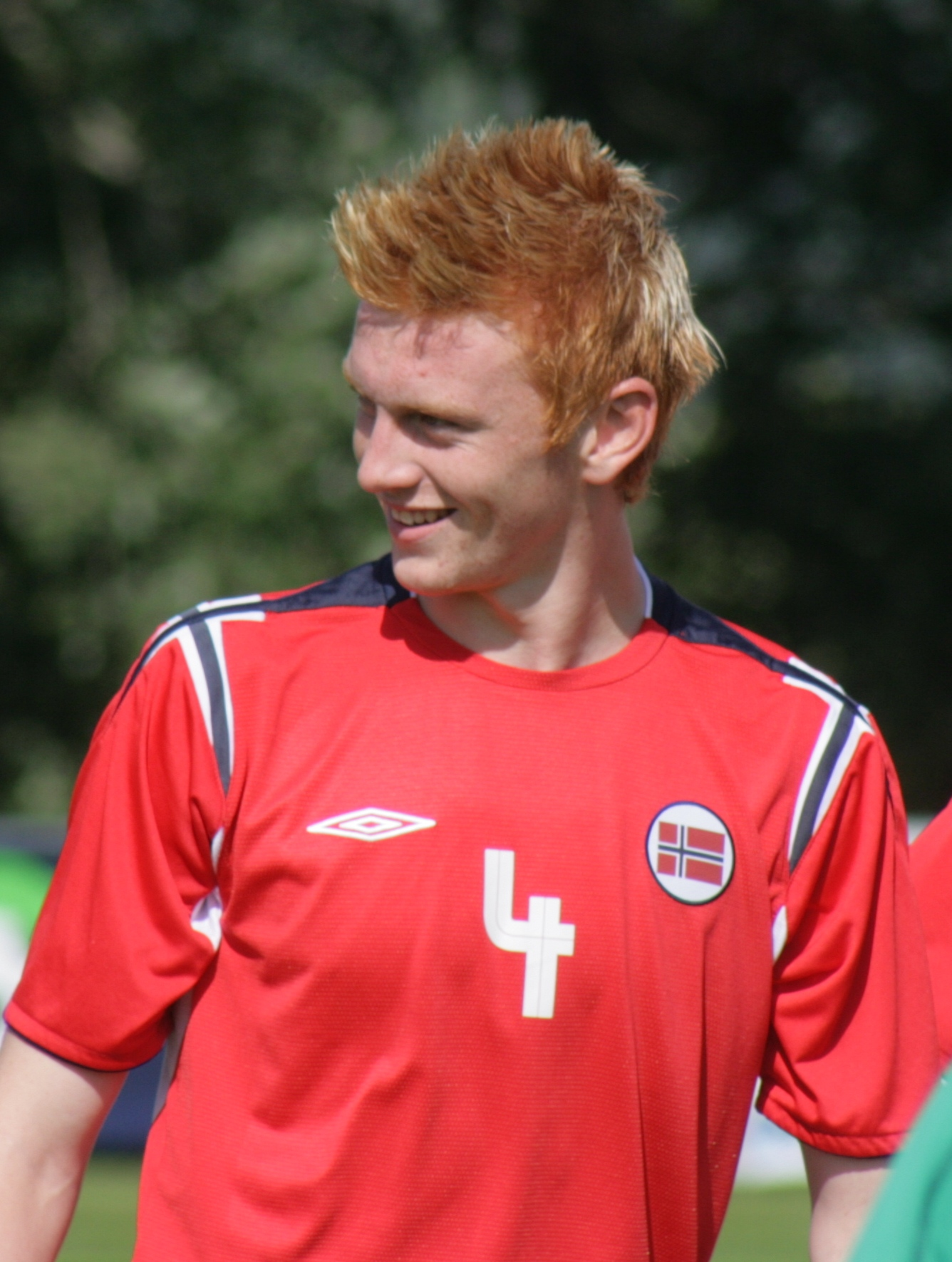

Personal information
- Date of birth: 16 March 1990 (age 36)
- Place of birth: Bergen, Norway
- Height: 1.88 m (6 ft 2 in)
- Position: Defender

Youth career
- Vadmyra

Senior career*
Years	Team	Apps	(Gls)
2007	Vadmyra		
2007	→ Fyllingen (loan)		
2008–2010	Løv-Ham	38	(2)
2011–2012	Vålerenga	14	(0)
2013–2015	Hønefoss	52	(7)
2015	Viking	2	(0)
2016	Raufoss	14	(1)
2016–2017	Asker	31	(1)
2018	Åsane	20	(0)
2019	Vadmyra	1	(0)

International career
2007	Norway U17	9	(0)
2008	Norway U18	2	(0)
2009	Norway U19	2	(0)
2013–2014	Norway U23	2	(0)
- * Club domestic league appearances and goals

Aleksander Solli (born 16 March 1990) is a retired Norwegian footballer who played as a defender. He has represented Norway at youth international level.

Hailing from Bergen, Solli started his professional career with Løv-Ham before he signed with the Tippeligaen side Vålerenga ahead of the 2011 season. After two seasons with the Oslo-based club, he joined Hønefoss ahead of the 2013 season.

On 14 August 2015 he signed for Viking on a contract valid to the end of the 2015 season.

== Club career ==
Solli was born in Førde Municipality, but grew up in Bergen where he played for Vadmyra during his youth. He was loaned out to the 2. divisjon side Fyllingen during the 2007 season, and was wanted by both Bryne and Løv-Ham ahead of the 2008 season. After joining Løv-Ham he made his debut for the club on 29 June 2008 in the 3–2 victory over Haugesund. In 2009, he suffered from injuries and played only three matches for Løv-Ham, but was a regular on the team that qualified for promotion play-off during the 2010 season.

Before the 2011 season he signed a contract with Vålerenga. He got his debut in a 1–0 victory against Sogndal. Solli did not start a match for Vålerenga, but made 14 appearances as a substitute. Solli was brought to the club by Martin Andresen, but Solli was not a part of new head coach Kjetil Rekdal's long-term plans. It was suggested he find himself a new club before the 2013 season.

Before the 2013 season he signed a contract with Hønefoss. Solli scored a goal from a free kick in his debut for the club, in the 2–0 victory against Strømsgodset. This was also his first goal in Tippeligaen. He also scored the match-winning goal against his old club Vålerenga, but did not celebrate it.

Ahead of the 2016 season he joined Raufoss. Going on to Asker in mid-season, he returned to Bergen and Åsane in 2018. A single outing for Vadmyra in 2019 spelled the end of his career.

== International career ==
Solli first represented Norway at under-17 level in 2007, where he played nine matches. The next year he played two matches for the under-18 team, before he made two appearances for the under-19 team in 2009.

== Career statistics ==
As of 18 August 2018

Season	Club	Division	League		Cup		Total	
Season	Club	Division	Apps	Goals	Apps	Goals	Apps	Goals
2008	Løv-Ham	Adeccoligaen	18	2	1	1	19	3
2009	Løv-Ham	Adeccoligaen	3	0	0	0	3	0
2010	Løv-Ham	Adeccoligaen	17	0	3	1	20	1
2011	Vålerenga	Tippeligaen	7	0	1	0	8	0
2012	Vålerenga	Tippeligaen	7	0	0	0	7	0
2013	Hønefoss	Tippeligaen	29	5	3	0	32	5
2014	Hønefoss	1. divisjon	15	2	1	2	16	4
2015	Hønefoss	OBOS-ligaen	8	0	0	0	8	0
2015	Viking	Tippeligaen	2	0	0	0	2	0
2016	Raufoss	OBOS-ligaen	14	1	0	0	14	1
2016	Asker	2. divisjon	9	0	0	0	9	0
2017	Asker	2. divisjon	22	1	2	0	24	1
2018	Åsane	OBOS-ligaen	13	0	2	1	15	1
Career Total			164	11	13	5	177	16
