= Helge Haugen =

Norwegian footballer (born 1982)

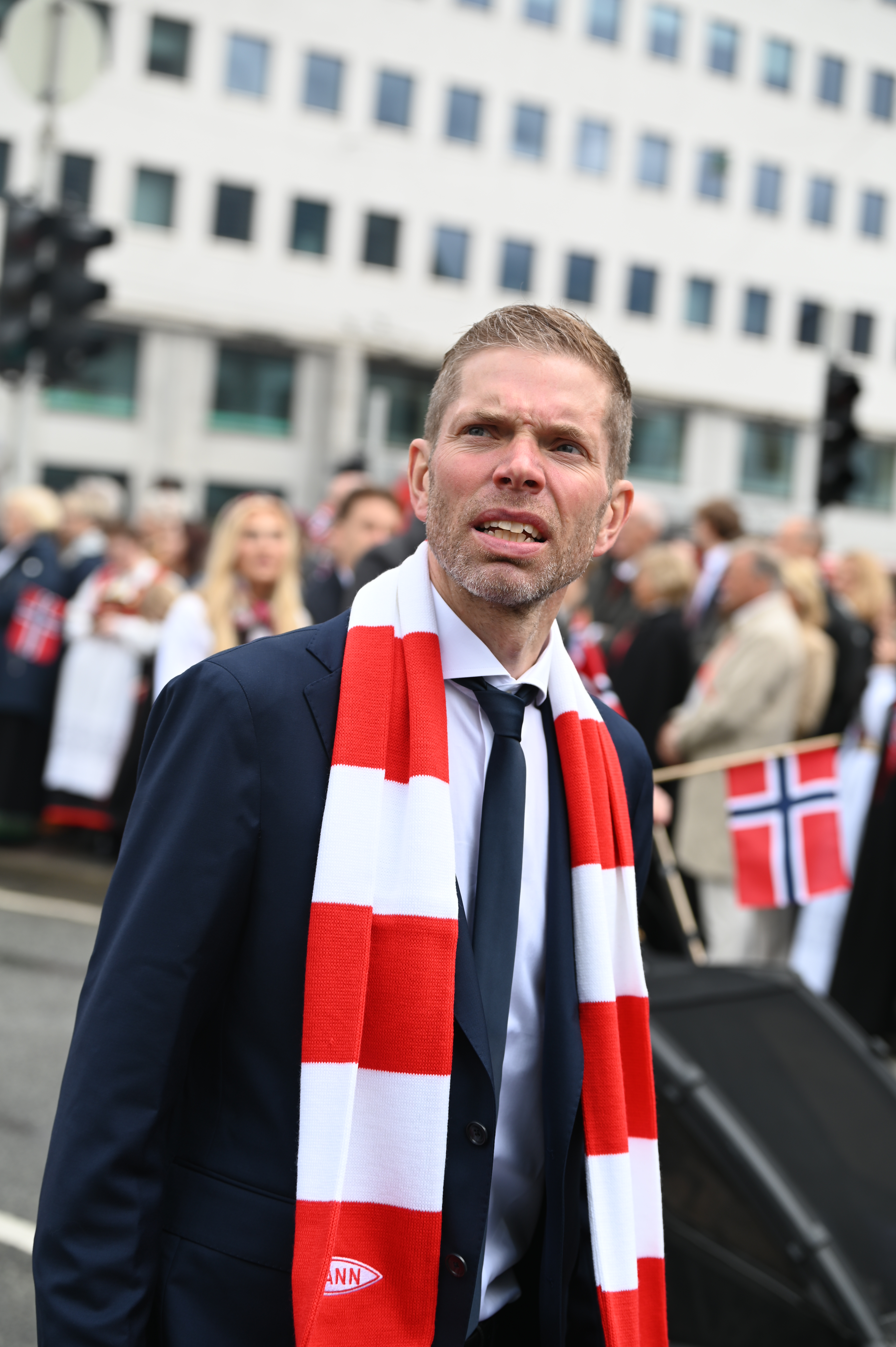
- Haugen in 2026

Personal information
- Date of birth: 15 February 1982 (age 44)
- Place of birth: Bergen, Norway
- Height: 1.80 m (5 ft 11 in)
- Position: Defensive midfielder

Youth career
- Åsane

Senior career*
Years	Team	Apps	(Gls)
- Åsane
2002–2007	Brann	88	(2)
2007–2011	Tromsø	90	(2)
2011	→ Hønefoss (loan)	29	(1)
2012–2013	Hønefoss	53	(1)
2014–2015	Sogndal	27	(0)

International career
2003	Norway U21	1	(0)
- * Club domestic league appearances and goals

Helge Haugen (born 15 February 1982) is a Norwegian former professional footballer who played as a midfielder. Born in Bergen, Haugen started his professional career in the local Tippeligaen club Brann. During his time at the club, he won the 2004 Norwegian Football Cup and the 2007 Tippeligaen. He has later played for Tromsø and Hønefoss, before he joined Sogndal ahead of the 2014 season. Haugen played one match for the Norwegian under-21 team in 2003.

== Career ==
=== Early life ===
Haugen was born in Bergen and grew up in Åsane, where he played for Åsane Fotball. He did also compete in orienteering during his youth, becoming a medallist in the Norwegian youth orienteering championship. Haugen represented Norway at youth international level, where he made eight appearances without scoring a goal between 1998 and 2000. He played for Åsane's first team in the 2. divisjon in 2001, when the team won promotion to the 1. divisjon. After the season, he transferred to the Tippeligaen team Brann.

=== Brann ===
Haugen made his debut for Brann against Bodø/Glimt in May 2002, and made two appearances in Tippeligaen in his first season with the club. After the 2002 season, where Brann had to play play-off matches against Sandefjord, the head coach Teitur Thordarson stated that Haugen and five other players did not have a future with the club. While four of the players were released from their contracts, Thordarson wanted to send Haugen on loan to another club. Ahead of the 2003 season, Mons Ivar Mjelde replaced Thordarson as Brann's head coach, and Mjelde wanted to keep Haugen at the club, and he subsequently made his break-through at the first team during the second half of the season and was also called up to the Norwegian under-21 team for the first team. He made his only appearance for the under-21 in the match against Scotland U21 on 19 August 2003. After a poor start to the 2003 season for Brann, Mjelde decided to use Haugen along with Seyi Olofinjana in the central midfield, which was one of the contributing factors to Brann's good performance in the second half of the season when the team kept clear of relegation.

Haugen's first goal of the 2004 season was in the quarter-final of the 2004 Norwegian Football Cup, when Brann turned 0–2 to 3–2 and advanced to the semi-final at the expense of Bryne. Haugen also played in the Cup Final, when Brann won their first title the 1982. Haugen ended an impressive season with a goal against Malmö FF in the Royal League. Haugen got a fracture in his foot ahead of the 2005 season, which put him out of play during the pre-season. As Brann had signed Martin Andresen, Haugen only made some appearances as a substitute during the first half of the season. During the second half of the season, some of the team's midfielders was unavailable due to injuries, and Haugen was again playing regularly. The local player Haugen continued to be a first choice in the team's midfield for several seasons, despite getting competition from several expensive signings that was brought to the club. The 2006 season was arguably Haugen's best season, when he played regularly for the team that was fighting for the league title. Haugen only made four appearances in the 2007 season, when Brann won the Tippeligaen for the first time since 1963, and he joined Tromsø half-way through the season, as he wanted to play more regularly and signed a three-and-a-half-year contract with the club. Haugen played 129 official matches for Brann, scoring 5 goals.

=== Later career ===
Haugen is not known for scoring goals, but in the 2010 season he scored goals in two consecutive matches, first in the second round of the 2010 Norwegian Football Cup, before he scored another in the Tippeligaen match against Vålerenga on 24 May 2010.

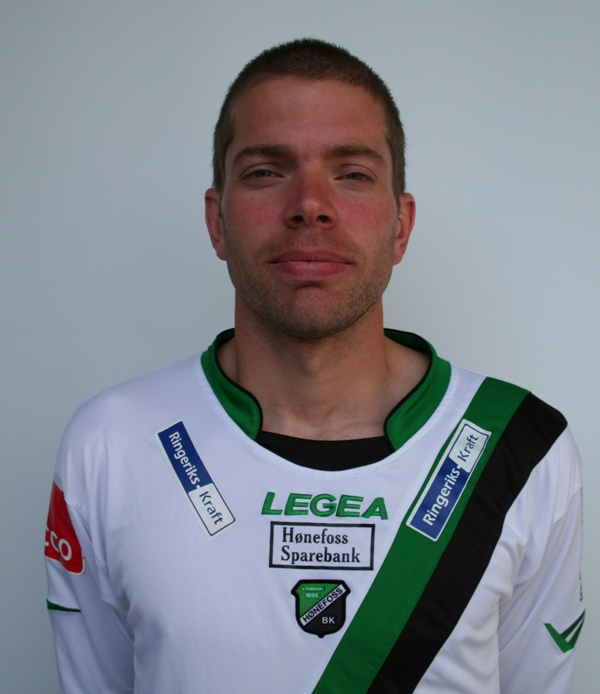
Haugen in Hønefoss BK

Haugen scored a goal that ended Hønefoss' goal-drought of 325 minutes, when his team won 3–1 against Sogndal on 3 November 2013.

Hønefoss was relegated from Tippeligaen after the 2013 season, and as Haugen's contract with the club had expired he joined Sogndal as a free agent.

== Career statistics ==
Appearances and goals by club, season and competition
Season	Club	League			Cup		Total	
Season	Club	Division	Apps	Goals	Apps	Goals	Apps	Goals
Brann	2002	Tippeligaen	2	0	0	0	2	0
Brann	2003	Tippeligaen	19	1	4	0	23	1
Brann	2004	Tippeligaen	25	0	6	1	31	1
Brann	2005	Tippeligaen	15	0	4	0	19	0
Brann	2006	Tippeligaen	23	1	4	0	27	1
Brann	2007	Tippeligaen	4	0	3	1	7	1
Tromsø	2007	Tippeligaen	13	0	1	0	14	0
Tromsø	2008	Tippeligaen	26	1	4	0	30	1
Tromsø	2009	Tippeligaen	28	0	5	0	33	0
Tromsø	2010	Tippeligaen	23	1	4	1	27	2
Hønefoss	2011	Adeccoligaen	29	1	4	0	33	1
Hønefoss	2012	Tippeligaen	27	0	2	0	29	0
Hønefoss	2013	Tippeligaen	26	1	2	0	28	1
Sogndal	2014	Tippeligaen	27	0	3	0	30	0
Sogndal	2015	OBOS-ligaen	0	0	0	0	0	0
Career total			287	6	46	3	333	9

== Honours ==
- Tippeligaen: 2007
- Norwegian Cup: 2004
