= Remond Mendy =

Senegalese footballer

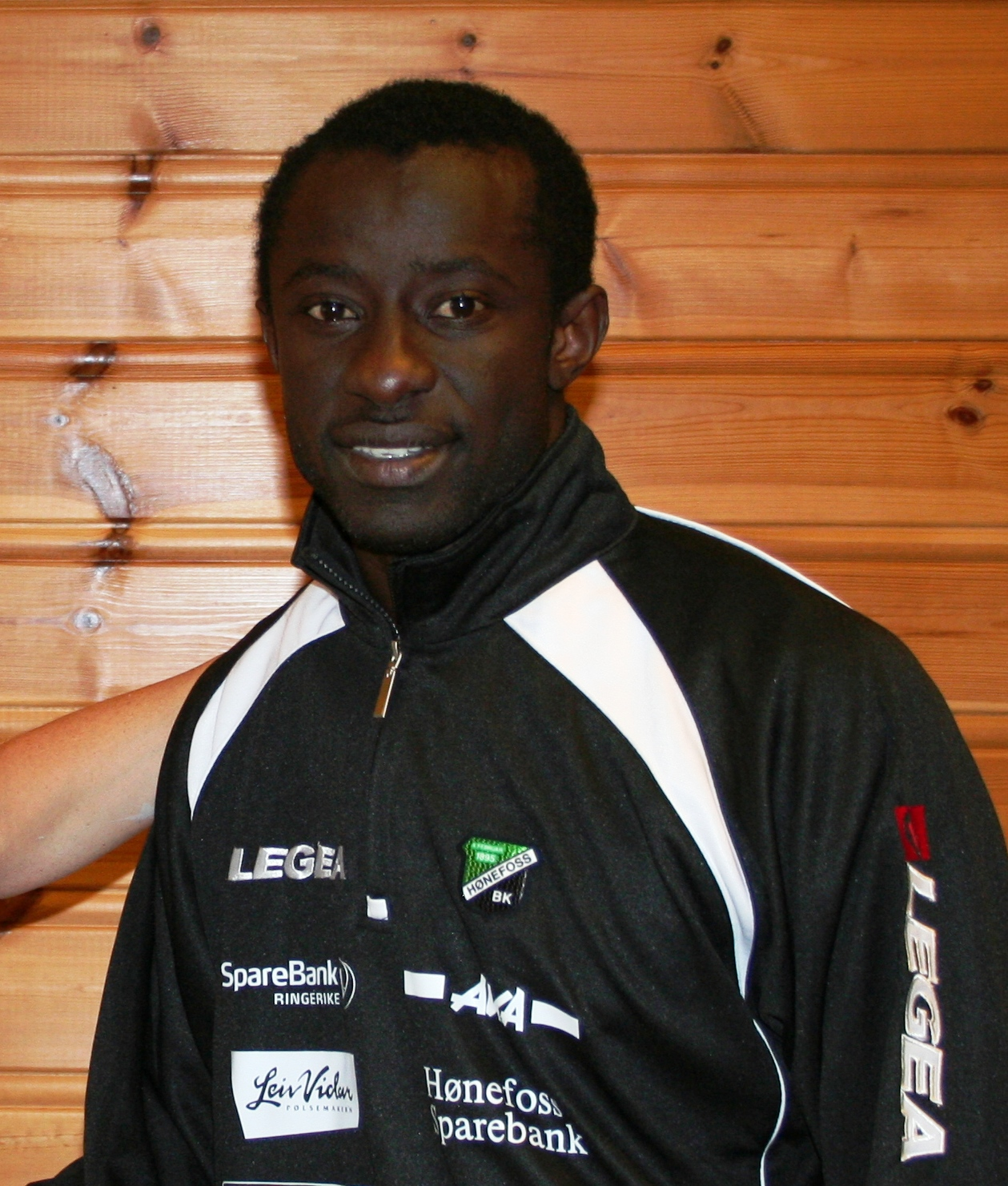
- Mendy in 2011

Personal information
- Full name: Remond Macougne Mendy
- Date of birth: 9 October 1985 (age 41)
- Place of birth: Dakar, Senegal
- Height: 1.81 m (5 ft 11 1/2 in)
- Position: Striker

Team information
- Current team: Jevnaker

Senior career*
Years	Team	Apps	(Gls)
2007–2009	Raufoss	61	(35)
2010–2011	Nybergsund	39	(16)
2011–2013	Hønefoss	60	(7)
2015–2017	Nybergsund	76	(19)
2019	Hønefoss	13	(6)
2023–	Jevnaker		
- * Club domestic league appearances and goals as of 20 August 2023

Remond Macougne Mendy (born 9 October 1985) is a Senegalese footballer who plays as a striker for Jevnaker.

== Club career ==
Mendy was born in Dakar. He made his debut for Raufoss on 9 September 2007 in the 1–4 defeat to Mandalskameratene. He also scored his first goal in this match.

He made his debut for Nybergsund on 5 April 2010 against Mjøndalen. He scored his first two goals against Ranheim on 30 May 2010.

He made his debut for Hønefoss on 4 August 2011 against Sandefjord. He scored his first goal for Hønefoss in the 6–0 victory against Randaberg on 7 August 2011.

Following several seasons without a club, he made a comeback for Jevnaker IF in August 2023.

== Career statistics ==
As of 15 September 2019

Season	Club	Division	League		Cup		Total	
Season	Club	Division	Apps	Goals	Apps	Goals	Apps	Goals
2007	Raufoss	1. divisjon	9	3	0	0	9	3
2008	Raufoss	2. divisjon	26	11	1	0	27	11
2009	Raufoss	2. divisjon	26	21	2	2	28	23
2010	Nybergsund	1. divisjon	24	7	3	1	27	8
2011	Nybergsund	1. divisjon	15	9	2	3	17	12
2011	Hønefoss	1. divisjon	13	5	0	0	13	5
2012	Hønefoss	Tippeligaen	24	1	1	1	25	2
2013	Hønefoss	Tippeligaen	23	1	1	0	24	1
2015	Nybergsund	2. divisjon	26	10	1	1	27	11
2016	Nybergsund	2. divisjon	26	6	1	0	27	6
2017	Nybergsund	2. divisjon	24	3	2	0	26	3
2019	Hønefoss	3. divisjon	9	4	0	0	9	4
Career total			245	81	14	8	259	89
