= Kevin Beugré =

Ivorian footballer

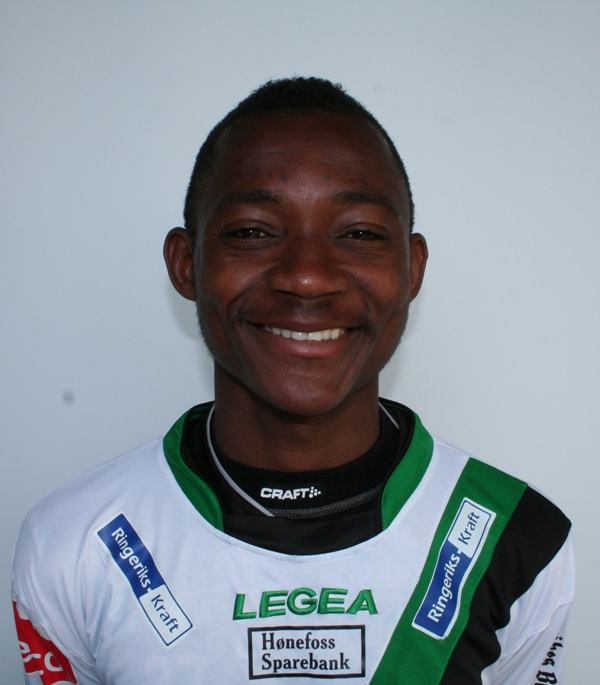

Personal information
- Full name: Kevin Bosse Elie Beugré
- Date of birth: 23 August 1992 (age 34)
- Place of birth: Adzopé, Ivory Coast
- Height: 1.72 m (5 ft 7 1/2 in)
- Position: Striker

Youth career
- Ivoire Academie

Senior career*
Years	Team	Apps	(Gls)
2010–2016	Hønefoss	115	(46)
2013	→ Mjøndalen (loan)	13	(2)
2017	HamKam	24	(10)
2018	Fram Larvik	11	(3)
2018	Egersund	14	(4)
2020–2021	FC San Pédro		
2021	Hønefoss	9	(5)
2022	MP	24	(8)
- * Club domestic league appearances and goals as of 8 October 2022

Kevin Bosse Elie Beugré (born 23 August 1992) is an Ivorian footballer who plays as a striker.

== Club career ==
Beugré was born in Adzope. He made his debut for Hønefoss on 7 November 2010 in the 6–1 defeat over Sandefjord. He scored his two first goals for Hønefoss in the 3–2 victory against Bodø/Glimt on 13 June 2011. He scored his first hat-trick for Hønefoss in the 5–3 victory against Nybergsund on 16 June 2011. In August 2013, Beugré was sent on loan to the First Division side Mjøndalen to play more regularly.

After spending 2017 in HamKam, he joined Fram Larvik ahead of the 2018 season, but as that club was threatened financially he moved on to Egersund. He left Egersund again at the end of 2018.

On 25 March 2021, he returned to his former club Hønefoss in the Norwegian Third Division.

== Career statistics ==
As of match played 30 October 2021

Club	Season	League			Cup		Other		Total	
Club	Season	Division	Apps	Goals	Apps	Goals	Apps	Goals	Apps	Goals
Hønefoss	2010	Eliteserien	1	0	0	0	—		1	0
Hønefoss	2011	1. divisjon	26	11	3	3	—		29	14
Hønefoss	2012	Eliteserien	14	3	3	4	—		17	7
Hønefoss	2013	Eliteserien	3	0	2	0	—		5	0
Hønefoss	2014	1. divisjon	18	3	1	1	—		19	4
Hønefoss	2015	1. divisjon	29	9	2	2	—		31	11
Hønefoss	2016	2. divisjon	24	20	2	0	—		26	20
Hønefoss	Total		115	46	13	10	—		128	56
Mjøndalen (loan)	2013	1. divisjon	13	2	0	0	2 (Note: Appearances in promotion play-offs.)	0	15	2
HamKam	2017	2. divisjon	24	10	0	0	—		24	10
Fram Larvik	2018	2. divisjon	11	3	2	1	—		13	4
Egersund	2018	2. divisjon	14	4	0	0	—		14	4
Hønefoss	2021	3. divisjon	9	5	0	0	—		9	5
Career Total			186	70	15	11	2	0	203	81
