= Hønefoss =

- Unincorporated city
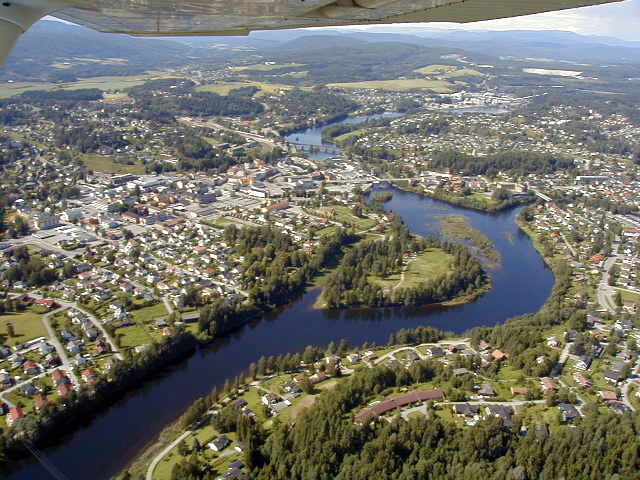
- Hønefoss and Storelva river seen from the air

- Location within Norway Hønefoss (Norway)
- Coordinates: 60°10′N 10°18′E
- Country: Norway
- County: Buskerud
- District: Ringerike
- Municipality: Ringerike
- City status: 1852
- Elevation: 96 m (315 ft)

Population (14 December 2022)
  - Total: 16,547
- Demonym: Hønefossing
- Time zone: UTC+1 (CET)
  - Summer (DST): UTC+2 (CEST)

Hønefoss is a town and the administrative center of the municipality of Ringerike in Buskerud county, Norway. Hønefoss is an industrial center of inner Østlandet, containing several factories and other industry. As of 1 January 2022, Hønefoss had 16,547 inhabitants. Between 1852 and 1964, the town was an independent municipality.

Hønefoss received town status and was separated from Norderhov into its own municipality in 1852. The town was built around the Hønefossen waterfall, from which the city derives its name. In 1964, Hønefoss ceased being a separate municipality and became part of Ringerike, where the town became its administrative center.

Hønefoss is a natural trading center for the populations of Ringerike, Hole, and Jevnaker. It is an inland town and a central hub in eastern Norway.

== Etymology ==
The town is named after Hønefossen, a waterfall on the Begna River. The first element is the name of the old farm Hønen (Old Norse *Hœnvin), the last element is foss (waterfall). The name of the farm is a compound of a word *hœn- (with an unknown meaning) and vin (meadow).

== Location ==
Hønefoss is located 63 kilometres northwest by road from the Norwegian capital of Oslo. Hønefoss is situated north of Lake Tyrifjorden. At Hønefoss, the Begna flows together with the Randselva river just below Hønefossen forming the Storelva river which flows into Nordfjord, the upper west branch of Lake Tyrifjord.

== Transportation ==
European route E16 runs near Hønefoss on its way from Oslo to Bergen. Hønefoss is connected to Norwegian national road 35 (Rv 35) which passes within town limits. Norwegian National Road 7 from Granvin in Hordaland ends at Hønefoss.

Hønefoss Station is located at the intersection between the Bergen Line (Bergensbanen), the Randsfjord Line and the Roa–Hønefoss Line. The rail station was opened in 1868 when the Randsfjord Line was extended from Tyristand to Randsfjord. The current station building was put into operation in 1909, in connection with the opening of the Bergen Line between Oslo and Geilo.

== Economy ==
Hønefoss is home to several factories and other industry, with Norske Skog Follum maintaining its headquarters in the city. Dating from 1873, Norske Skog Follum was one of the largest producers of newsprint in Europe. The paper mill closed in 2012.

Ringerikes Blad is a regional newspaper covering Ringerike, Hole and Jevnaker. Established in 1845, the newspaper is published daily in Hønefoss. As of 2006, the newspaper has a daily circulation of 12,684. the newspaper is an affiliation of the media company, Amedia.

== Climate ==
Hønefoss has a humid continental climate (Dfb) with relatively warm summers and cold winters with snow on the ground. The all-time high 33.7 °C (92.7 °F) was recorded July 2018. The all-time low −27.1 °C (−16.8 °F) was recorded 6 January 2024.

Climate data for Hønefoss 1991-2020 (Høyby, 140 m, average high/low 2006-2025, extremes 2005-2023, precip days 1961-90)
Month	Jan	Feb	Mar	Apr	May	Jun	Jul	Aug	Sep	Oct	Nov	Dec	Year
Record high °C (°F)	13 (55)	14.2 (57.6)	20.5 (68.9)	23.9 (75.0)	30.1 (86.2)	31.6 (88.9)	33.7 (92.7)	29.1 (84.4)	24.7 (76.5)	19.2 (66.6)	15.7 (60.3)	12.2 (54.0)	33.7 (92.7)
Mean daily maximum °C (°F)	−1.6 (29.1)	0.4 (32.7)	6 (43)	11.8 (53.2)	17.1 (62.8)	21.5 (70.7)	23.3 (73.9)	21.2 (70.2)	16.9 (62.4)	9.8 (49.6)	4 (39)	−0.4 (31.3)	10.8 (51.5)
Daily mean °C (°F)	−4.1 (24.6)	−3.5 (25.7)	0.5 (32.9)	5.3 (41.5)	10.6 (51.1)	14.8 (58.6)	17.3 (63.1)	15.9 (60.6)	11.5 (52.7)	5.5 (41.9)	0.8 (33.4)	−3.3 (26.1)	5.9 (42.7)
Mean daily minimum °C (°F)	−7.1 (19.2)	−6.2 (20.8)	−3.1 (26.4)	0.7 (33.3)	5.8 (42.4)	10.3 (50.5)	12.6 (54.7)	11.3 (52.3)	8 (46)	3.1 (37.6)	−1.1 (30.0)	−5.5 (22.1)	2.4 (36.3)
Record low °C (°F)	−27.1 (−16.8)	−24.7 (−12.5)	−19 (−2)	−9.3 (15.3)	−3.2 (26.2)	2.7 (36.9)	5.2 (41.4)	1.8 (35.2)	−2.8 (27.0)	−8.3 (17.1)	−16.2 (2.8)	−21.8 (−7.2)	−27.1 (−16.8)
Average precipitation mm (inches)	35 (1.4)	25 (1.0)	27 (1.1)	32 (1.3)	54 (2.1)	70 (2.8)	73 (2.9)	85 (3.3)	65 (2.6)	62 (2.4)	50 (2.0)	32 (1.3)	610 (24.2)
Average precipitation days (≥ 1.0 mm)	8	6	7	7	9	9	11	10	10	10	9	8	104
Source 1: Norwegian Meteorological Institute eklima.met.no
Source 2: Seklima

== Sport ==
- Hønefoss BK is a football club that as of 2016 plays in Norwegian Third Division.
- Ringerike Panthers is located in Hønefoss, they play in the first tier of Norwegian hockey.

== Cultural attractions ==
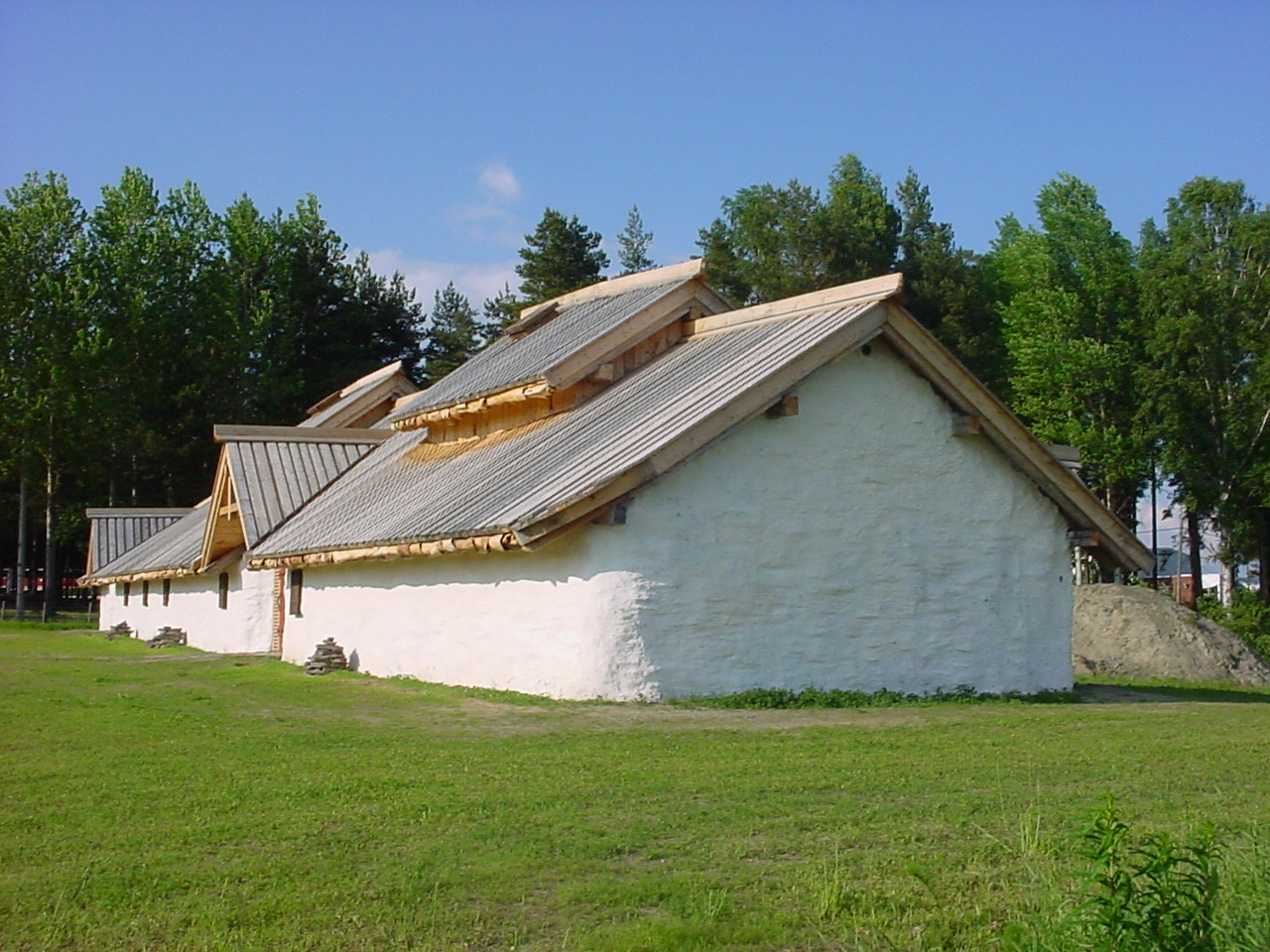
Early Iron Age guild hall at Veien Cultural Heritage Park in Hønefoss

Ringerikes Museum (Ringerikes Museum) is located nearby in the former Norderhov Rectory. The museum is noted for its icon collection, its rune stones and its collection of the private belongings of Jørgen Engebretsen Moe. Jørgen Moe was a Norwegian author, who is best known for the Norske Folkeeventyr, a collection of Norwegian folk tales which he edited in collaboration with Peter Christen Asbjørnsen. It is affiliated with the Buskerud Museum (Buskerudmuseet).

Buskerud Photography Archive (Buskerud fylkesfotoarkiv) is a central archive for photography and photo-historical material from Buskerud. The archives accommodates approx. 200,000 photographs dating from the 1850s. Buskerud fylkesfotoarkiv has shared office space with the Ringerikes Museum in Norderhov and is affiliated with the Buskerud Museum (Buskerudmuseet).

Veien Cultural Heritage Park (Veien Kulturminnepark) is in located in Hønefoss. The park contains over 100 grave mounds from the Early Iron Age, as well as a reconstructed longhouse and a museum. It is affiliated with the Buskerud Museum (Buskerudmuseet).

Ridder Farm (Riddergården) is located on the north side of Hønefoss. This had been a family farm dating to 1730. The farm was largely developed by Fredrik Ridder (1756–1798), who had inherited it from his father. This was also the home of the manager of the local sawmill for generations. Ringerike Municipality has managed the property since 1964 in associated with Ringerike Museum.

== Notable residents ==
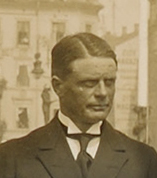
Leif Ragnar Dietrichson, 1925

- Anders Andersen (1846 in Hønefoss – 1931) a saw mill worker and politician
- Erika Stang (1861-1898), composer
- Leif Dietrichson (1890 in Hønefoss – 1928) a Norwegian military officer and aviation pioneer
- Karsten Alnæs (born 1938 in Hønefoss) an author, historian and journalist
- Per Inge Bjørlo (born 1952) a sculptor, painter and graphic designer, lives in Hønefoss
- Svein Olav Blindheim (born 1954) a jazz double bassist, composer and writer, lives in Hønefoss
- Geir Lippestad (born 1964 in Hønefoss) a controversial lawyer, politician and social activist
- Michele Waagaard (born 1980 in Hønefoss) a Thai model, pop star, actress and radio host
- Lars Fredrik Frøislie (born 1981 in Hønefoss) a musician, plays keyboards and drums
- Nils Bech (born 1981 in Hønefoss) a Norwegian singer
- Amal Aden (born 1983) Somali–Norwegian writer, lived in Hønefoss since 2002
- Emilie Marie Nereng (born 1995 in Hønefoss) blogger, musician and model

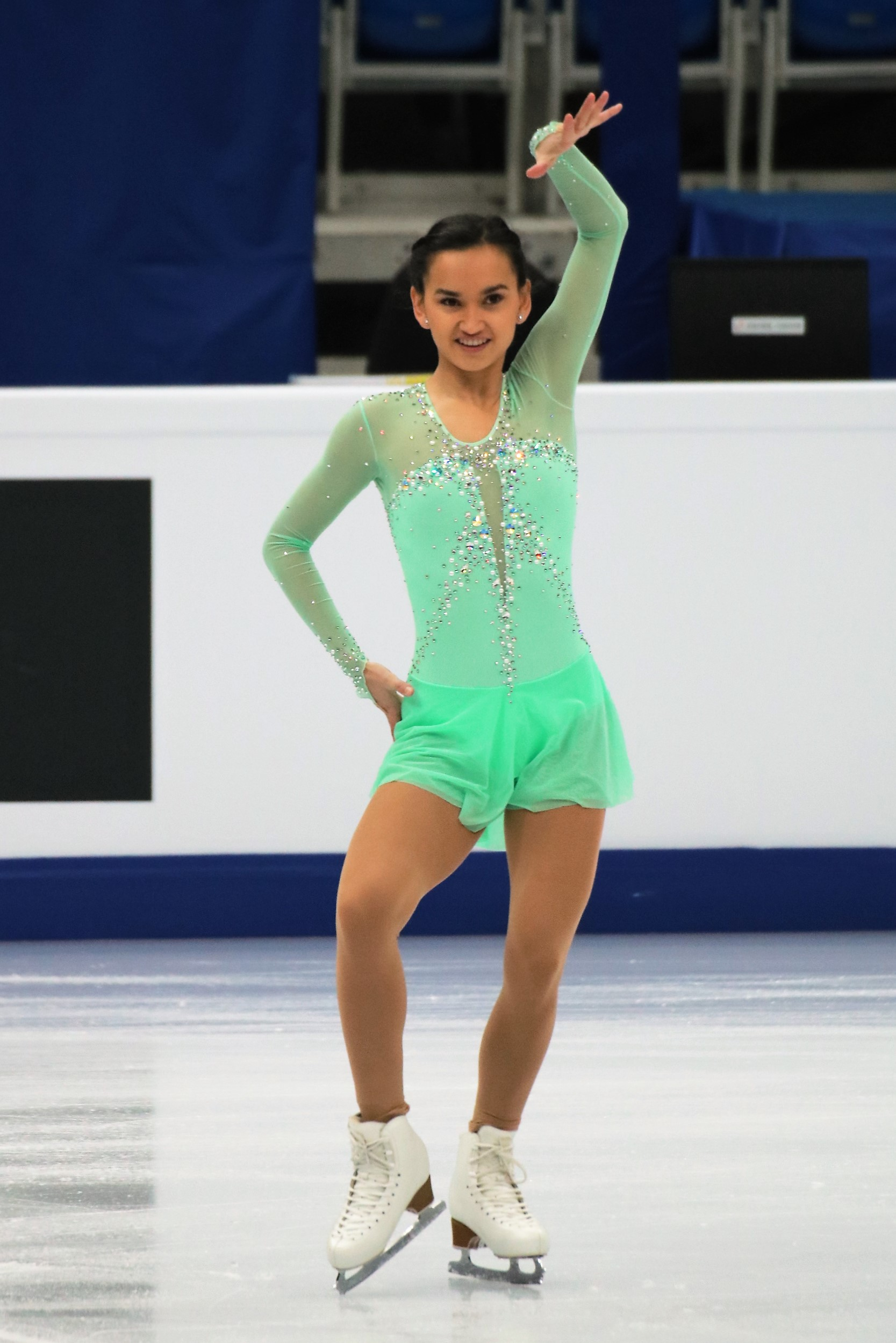
Anne Line Gjersem, 2018

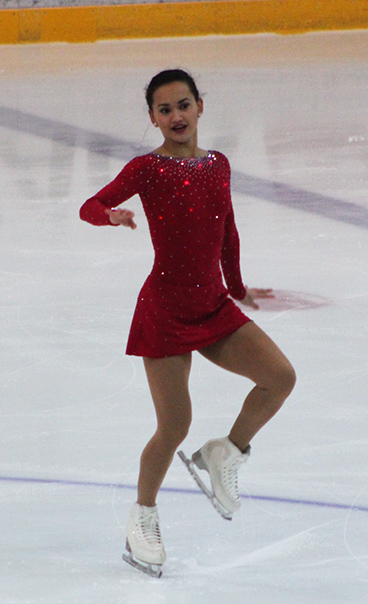
Camilla Gjersem, 2015

=== Sport ===
- Trygve Brodahl (1905 in Hønefoss – 1996) cross country skier
- Sverre Brodahl (1909–1998 in Hønefoss) a Nordic skier, team bronze and silver medallist at the 1936 Winter Olympics
- Frode Andresen (born 1973) Norwegian biathlete and cross-country skier, lives in Hønefoss
- Frode Lafton (born 1976) a former footballer, 523 caps with Hønefoss BK which he now manages
- twins Anne Line Gjersem & Camilla Gjersem (born 1994) figure skaters
- Anders Jacobsen (born 1985 in Hønefoss) ski jumper, team bronze medallist at the 2010 Winter Olympics, won the Four Hills Tournament
- Andrea Schjelderup Dalen (born 1992), professional ice hockey player for Djurgårdens IF and holder of the single season SDHL goal record
- Torstein Træen (born 1995), professional racing cyclist who rides on the Norwegian team Uno-X Mobility. He wore the yellow jersey in the 2026 Tour de France.

== See also ==
- Hønefoss Church

== Gallery ==
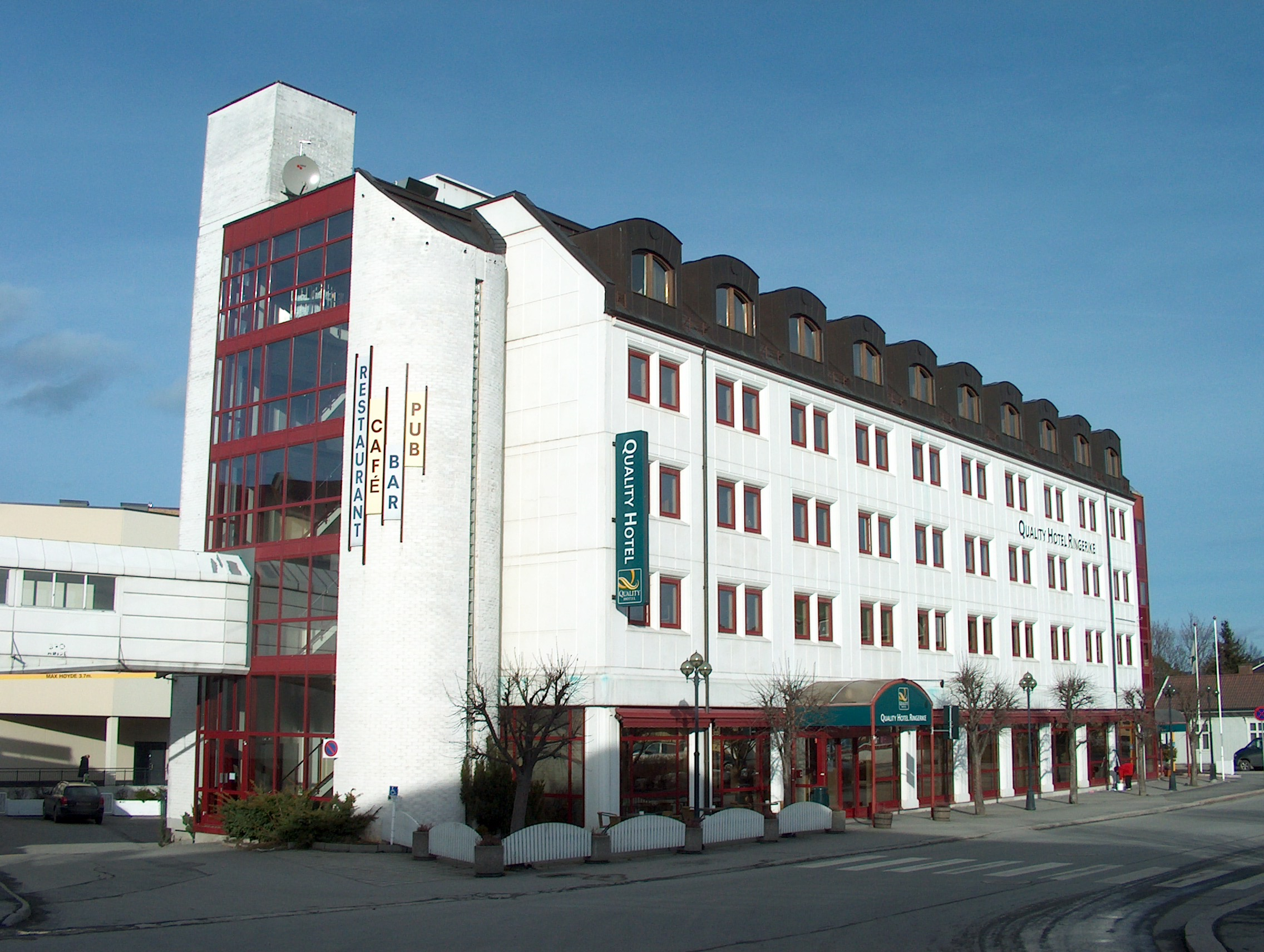
Scandic Hotell Hønefoss

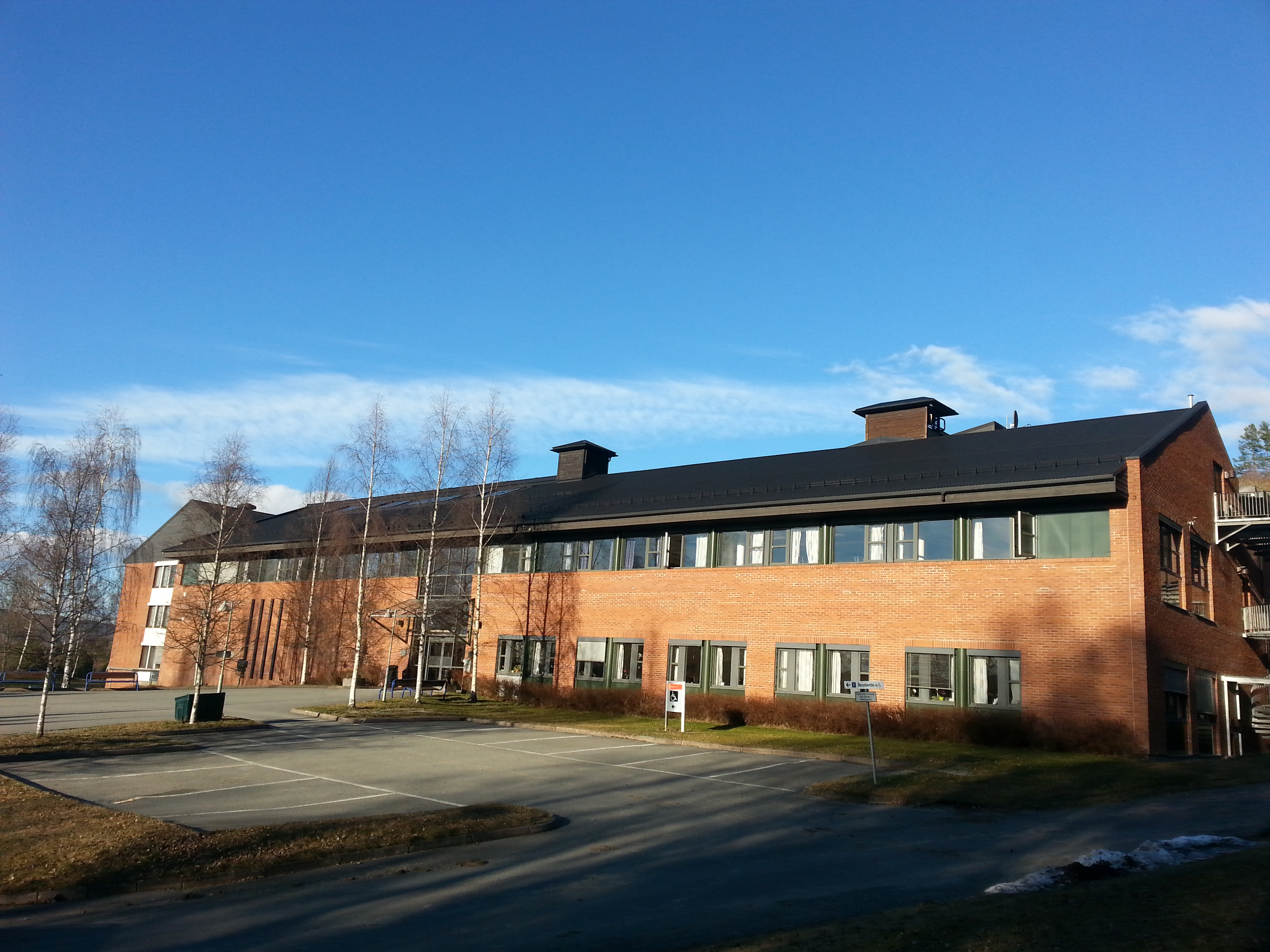
University College in Buskerud and Vestfold

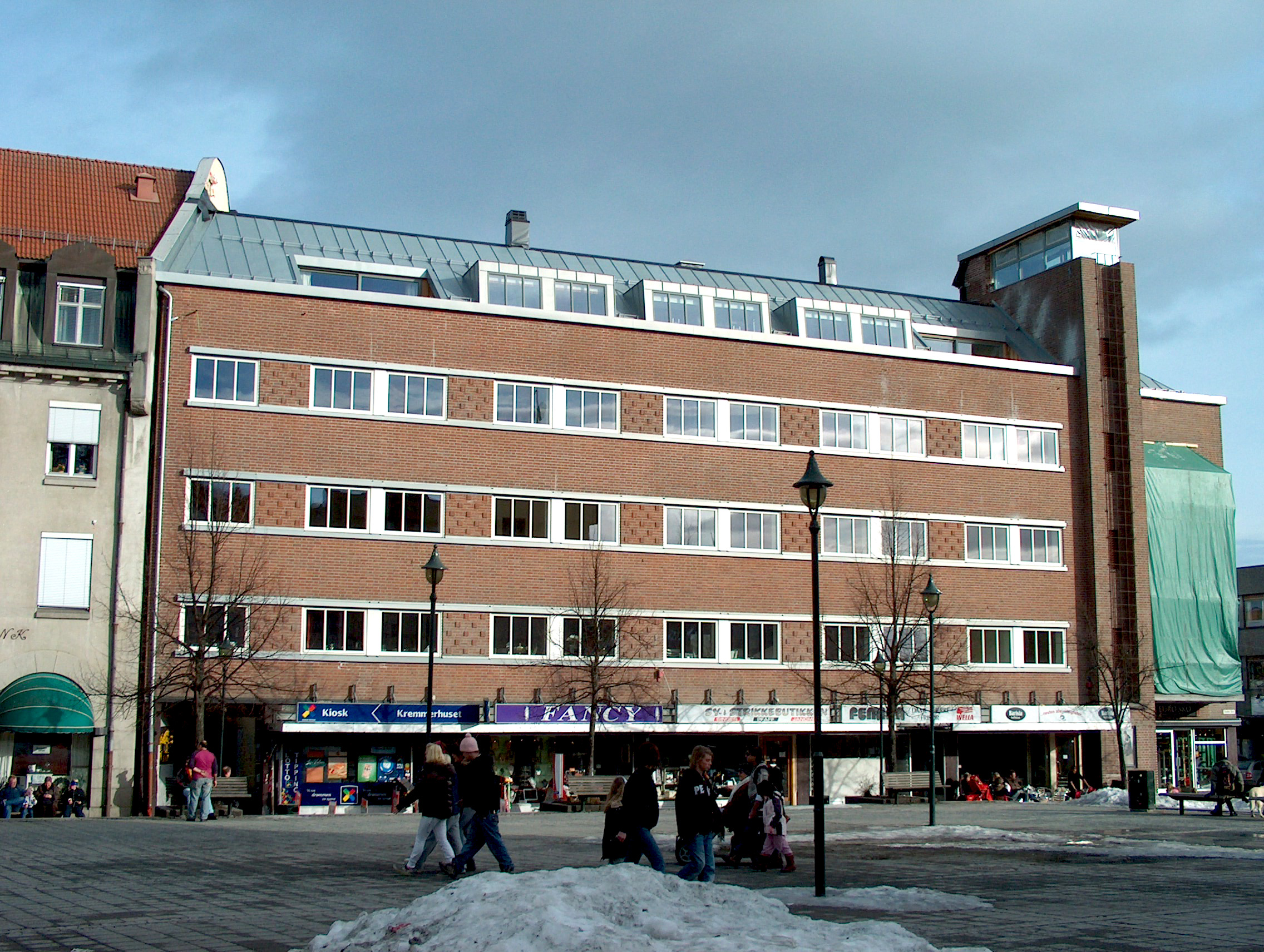
Hønefoss Brewery

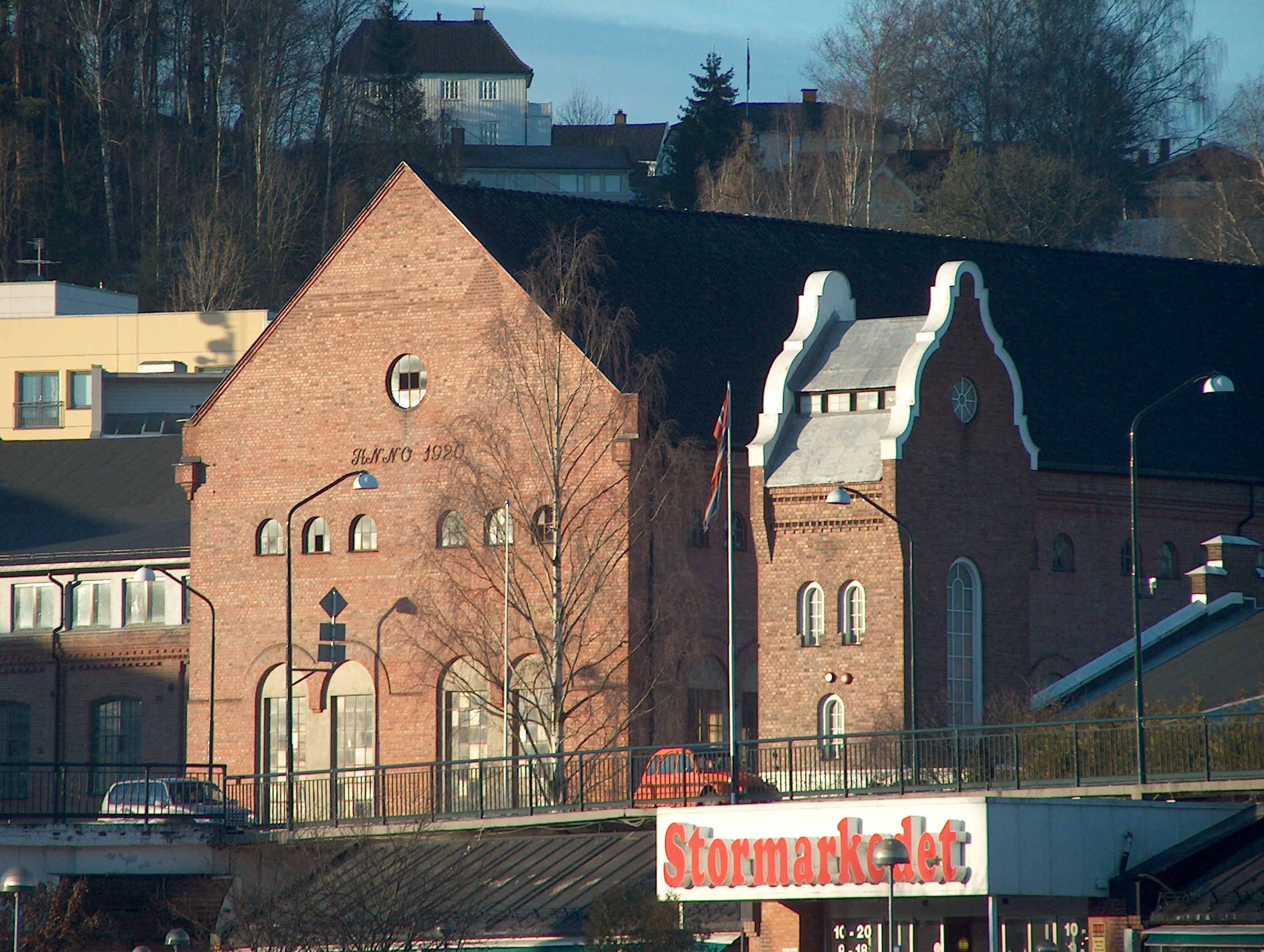
Hønefoss Power Station

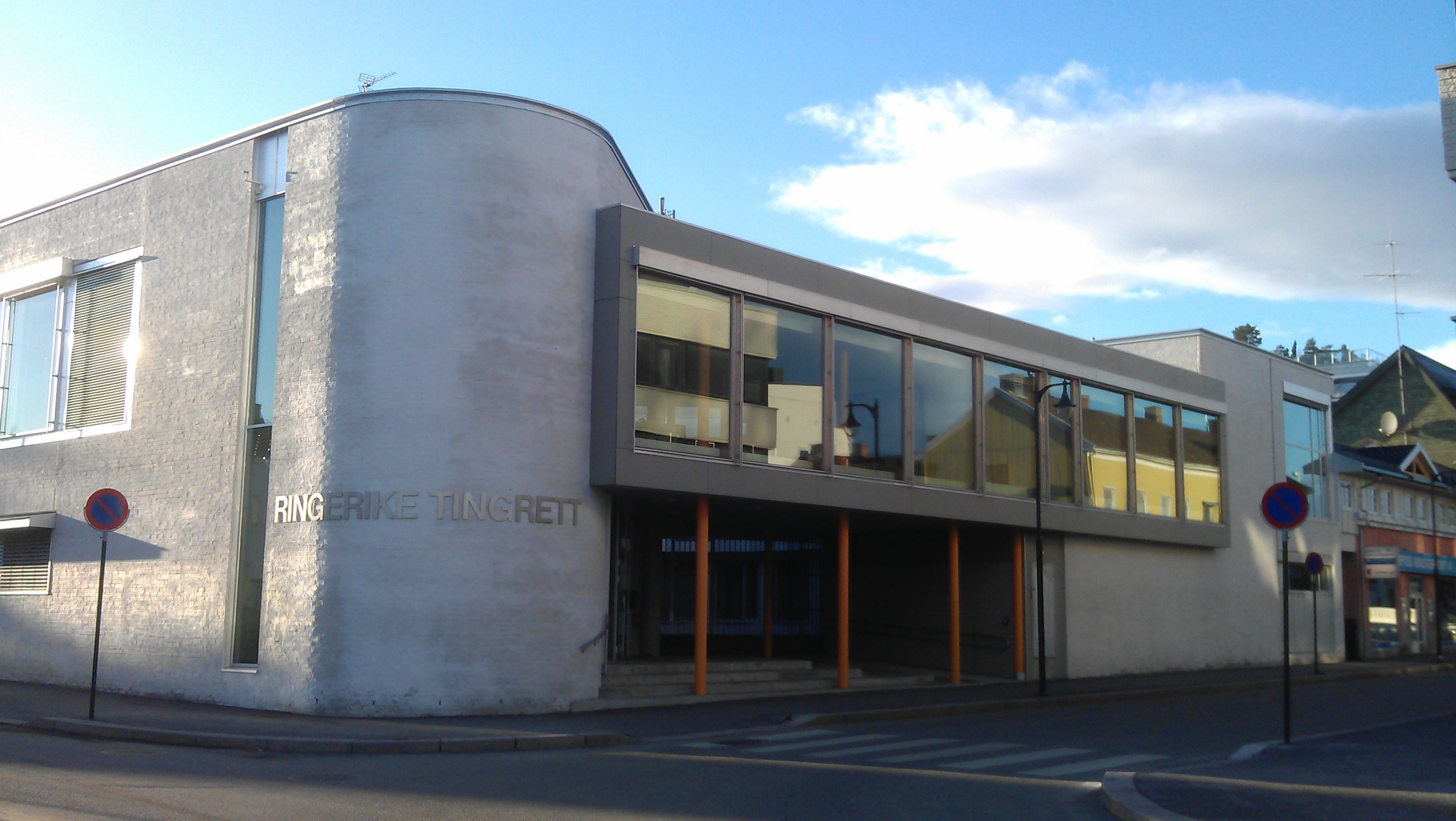
Ringerike District Court

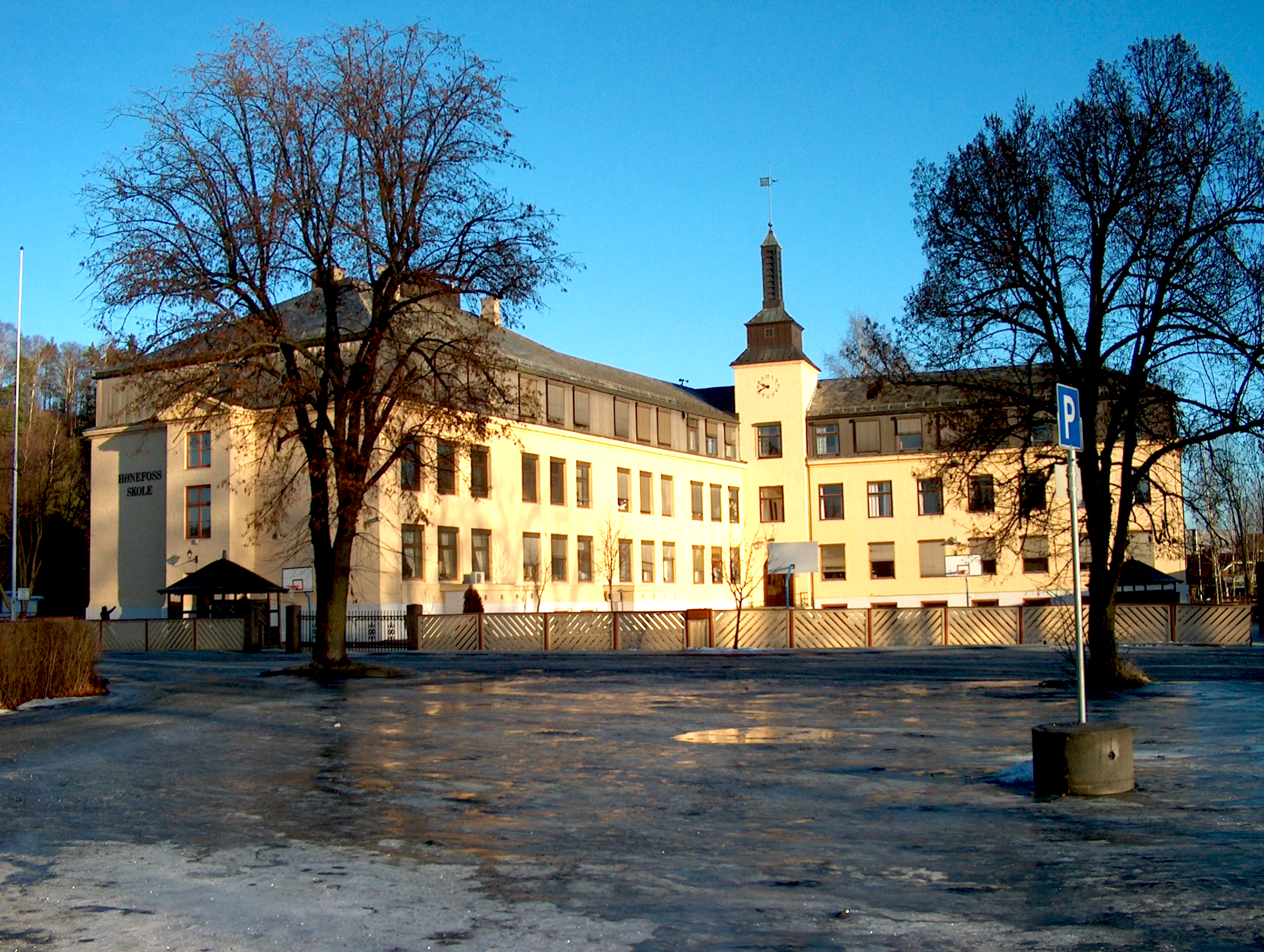
Hønefoss School

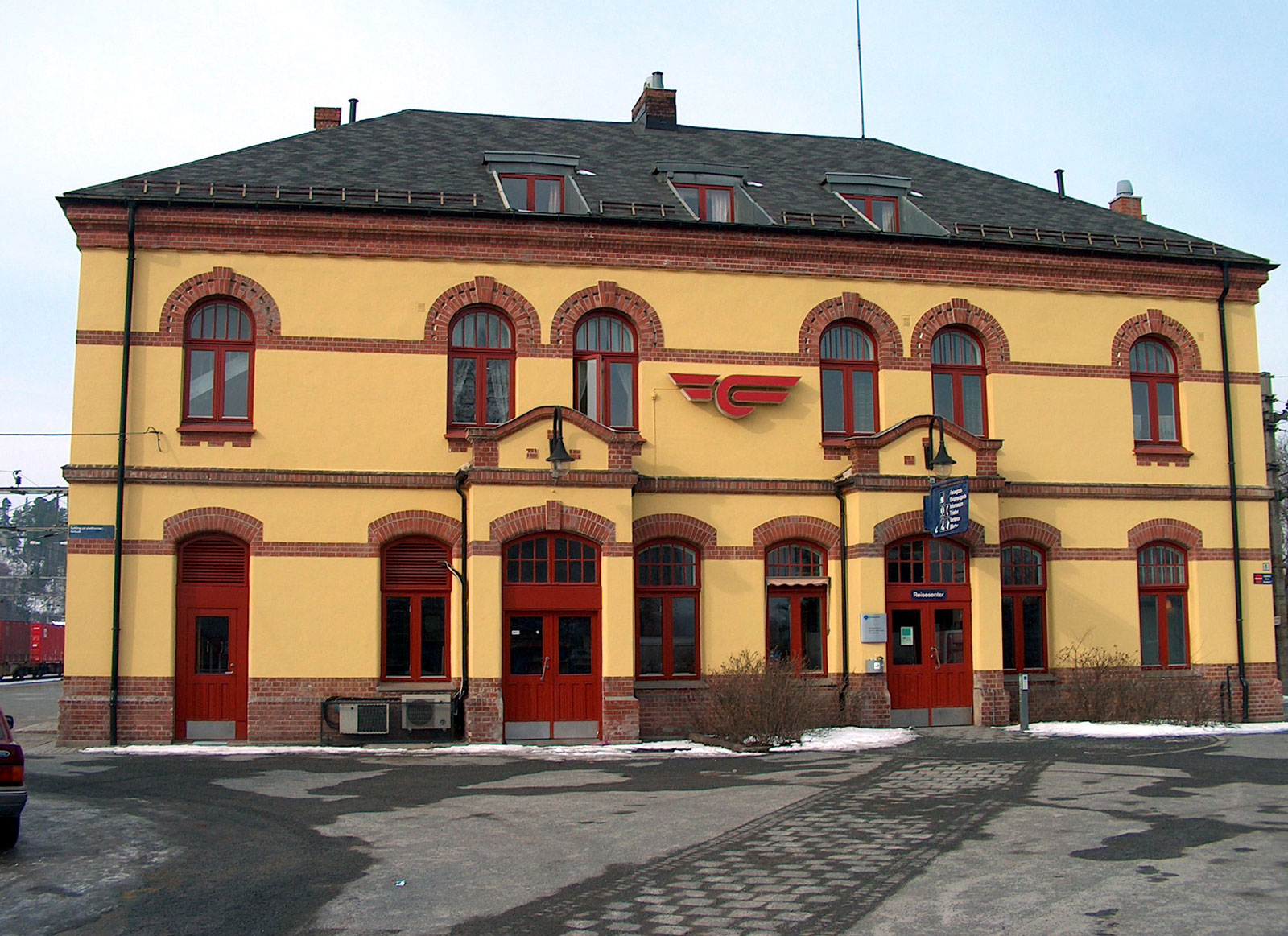
Hønefoss Train Station

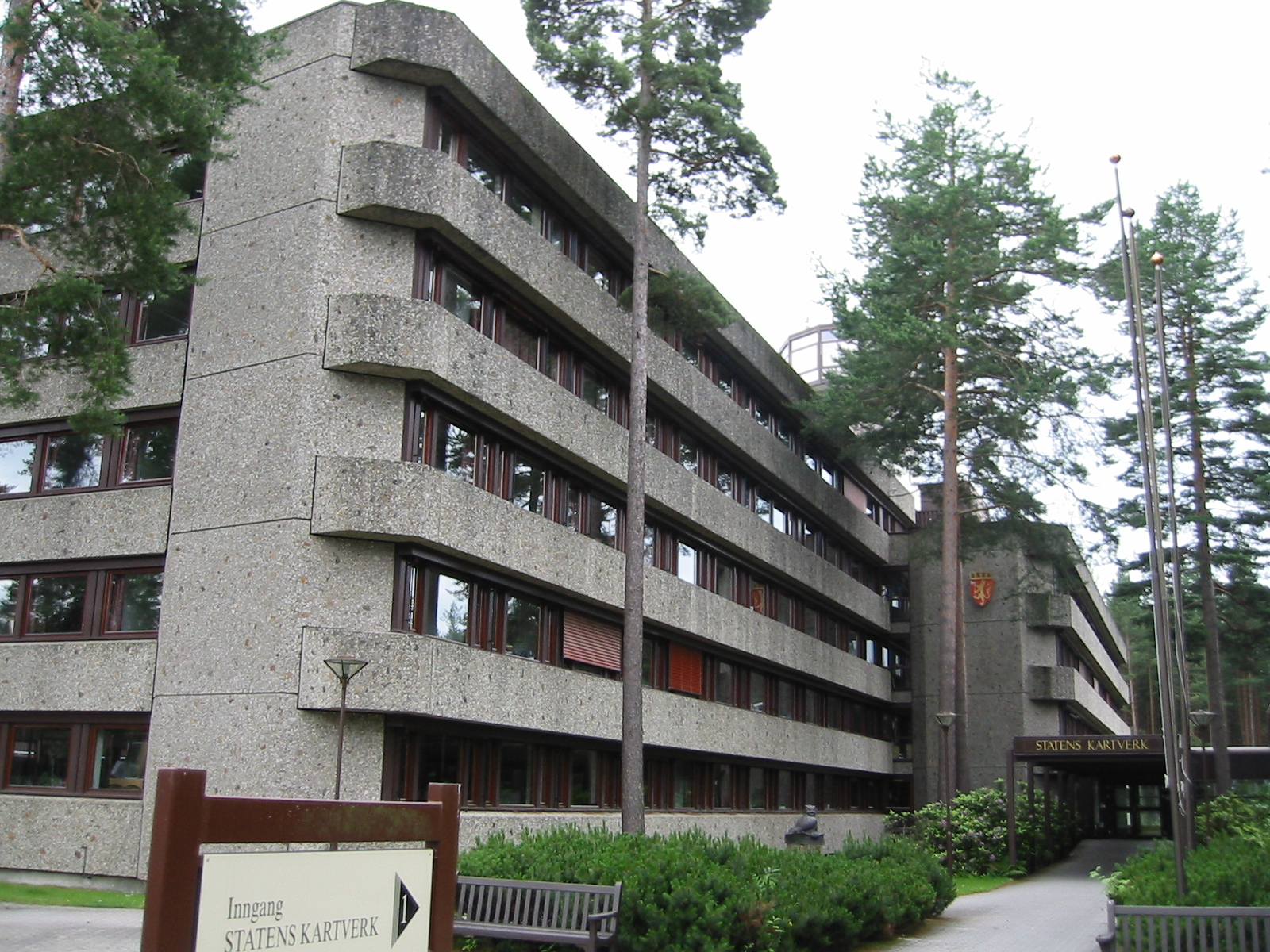
Kartverket

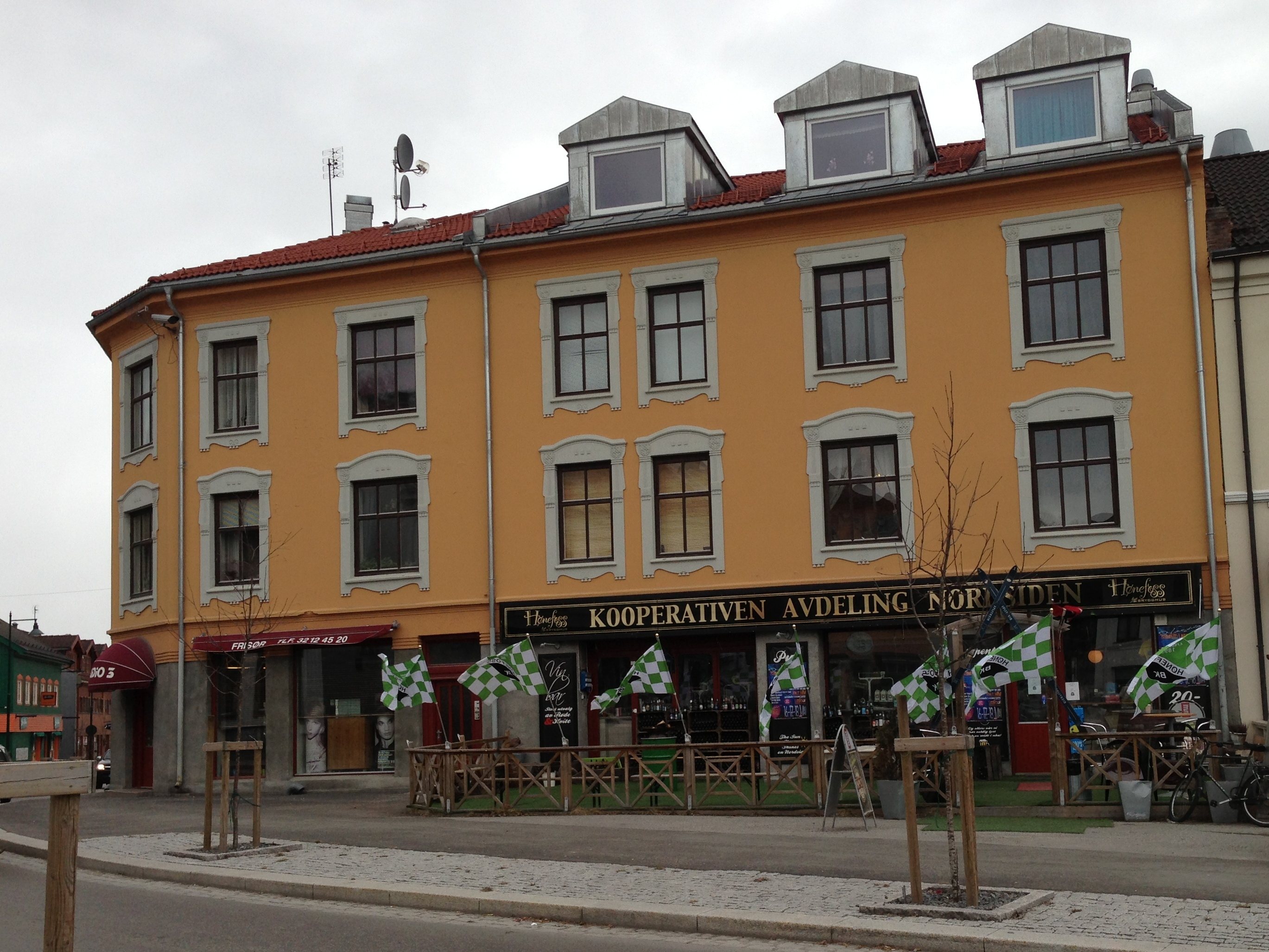
Hønefoss Cooperative

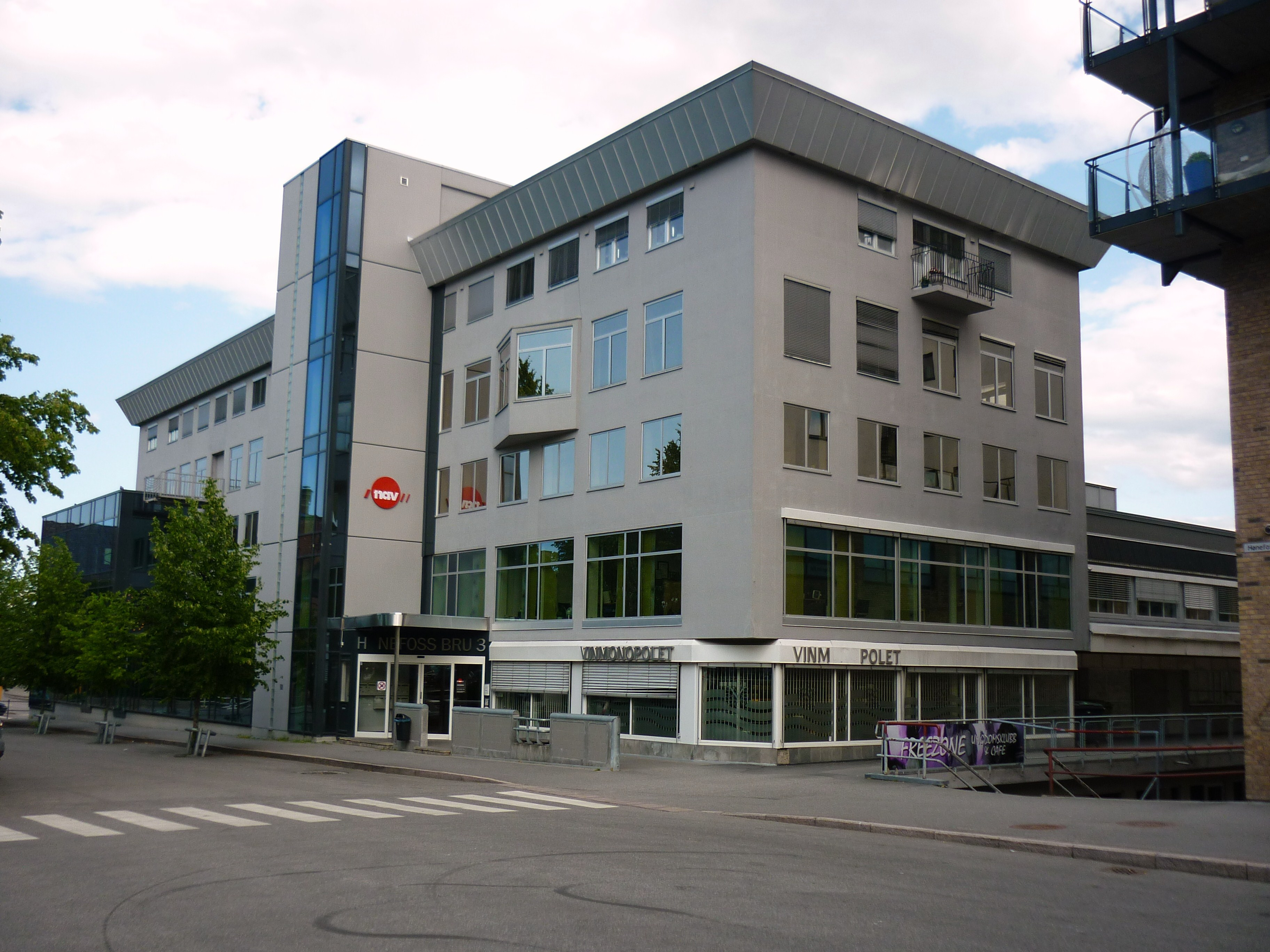
Samfunnshuset

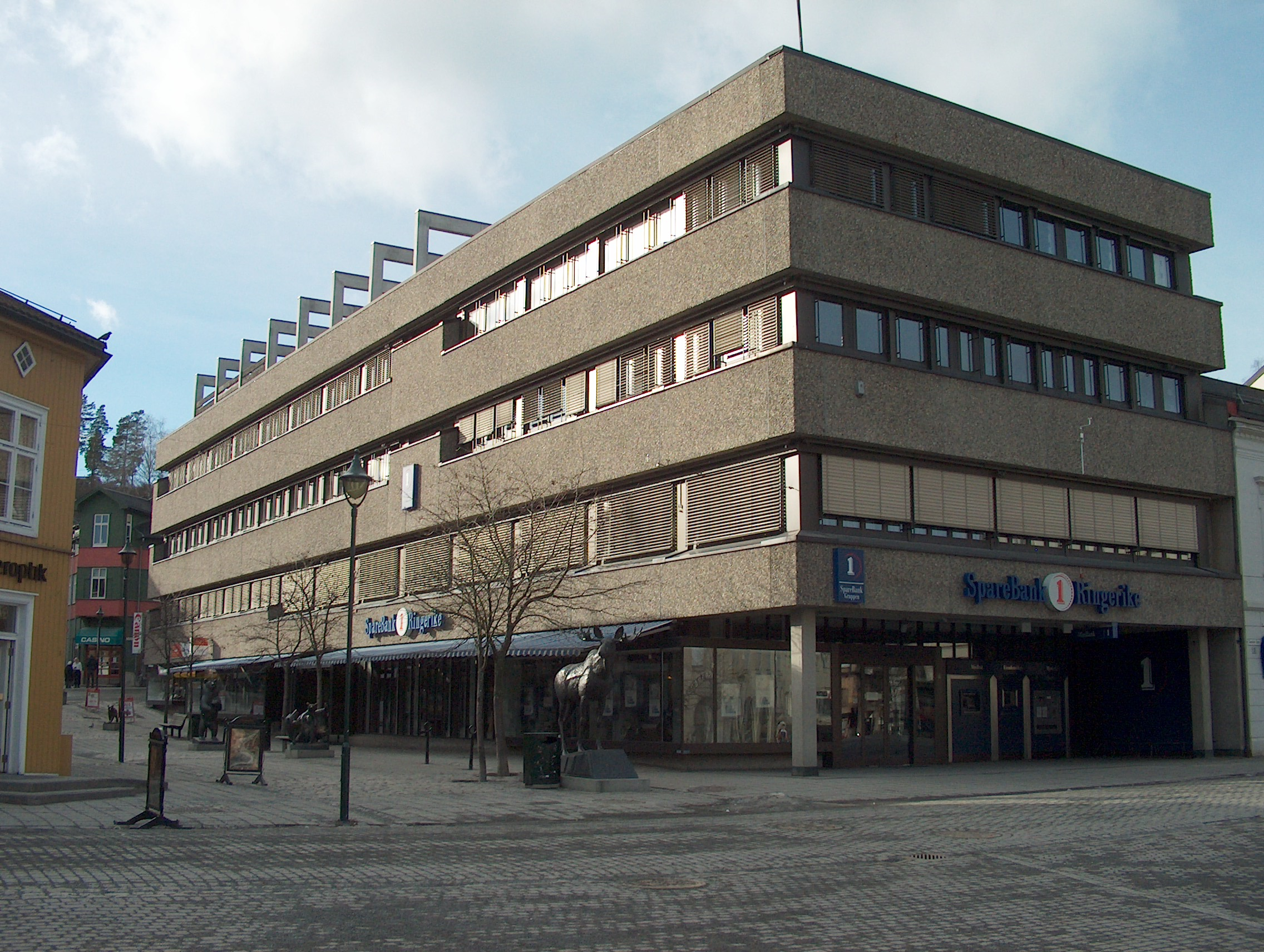
SpareBank 1

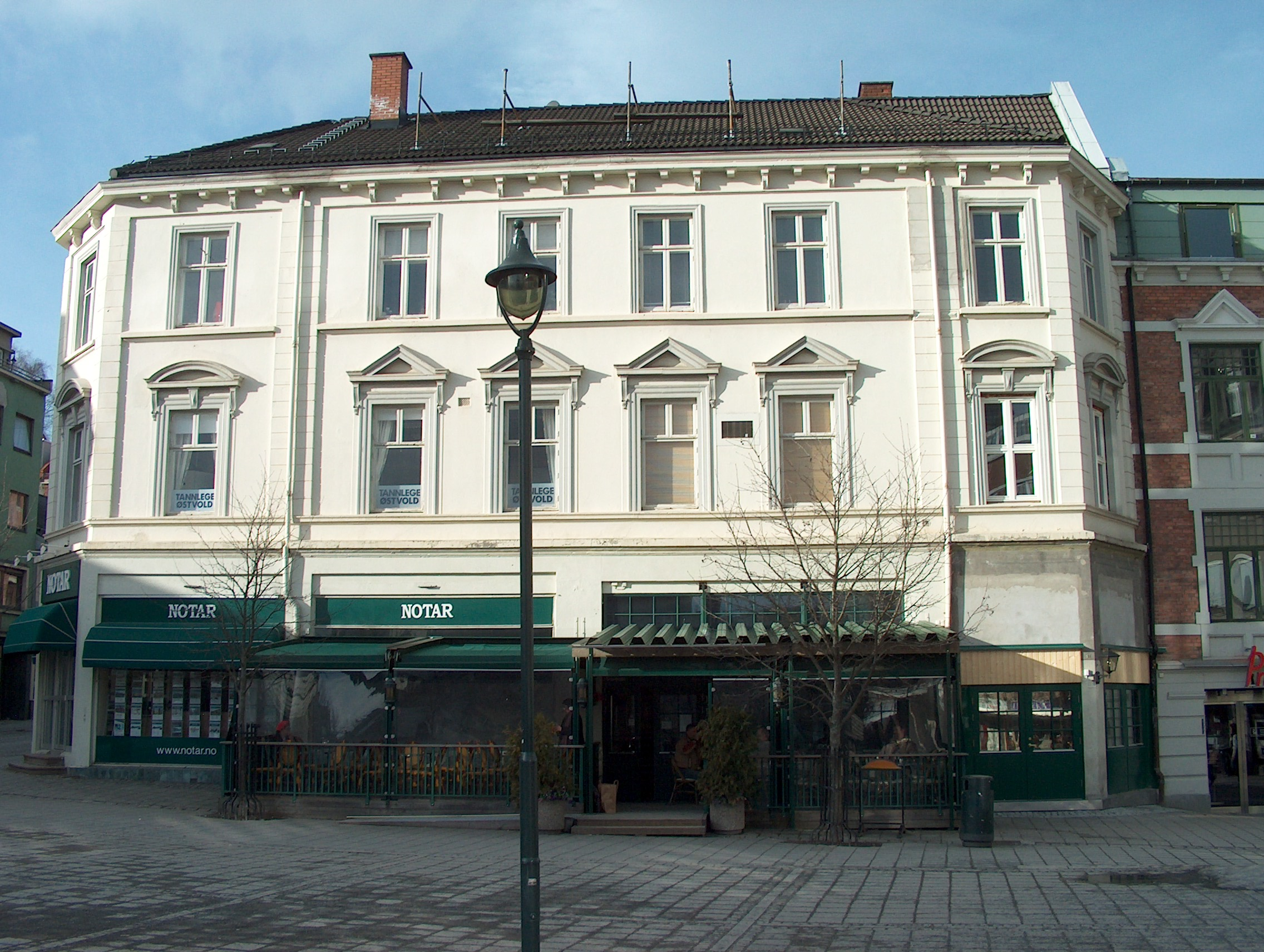
Skøiengården

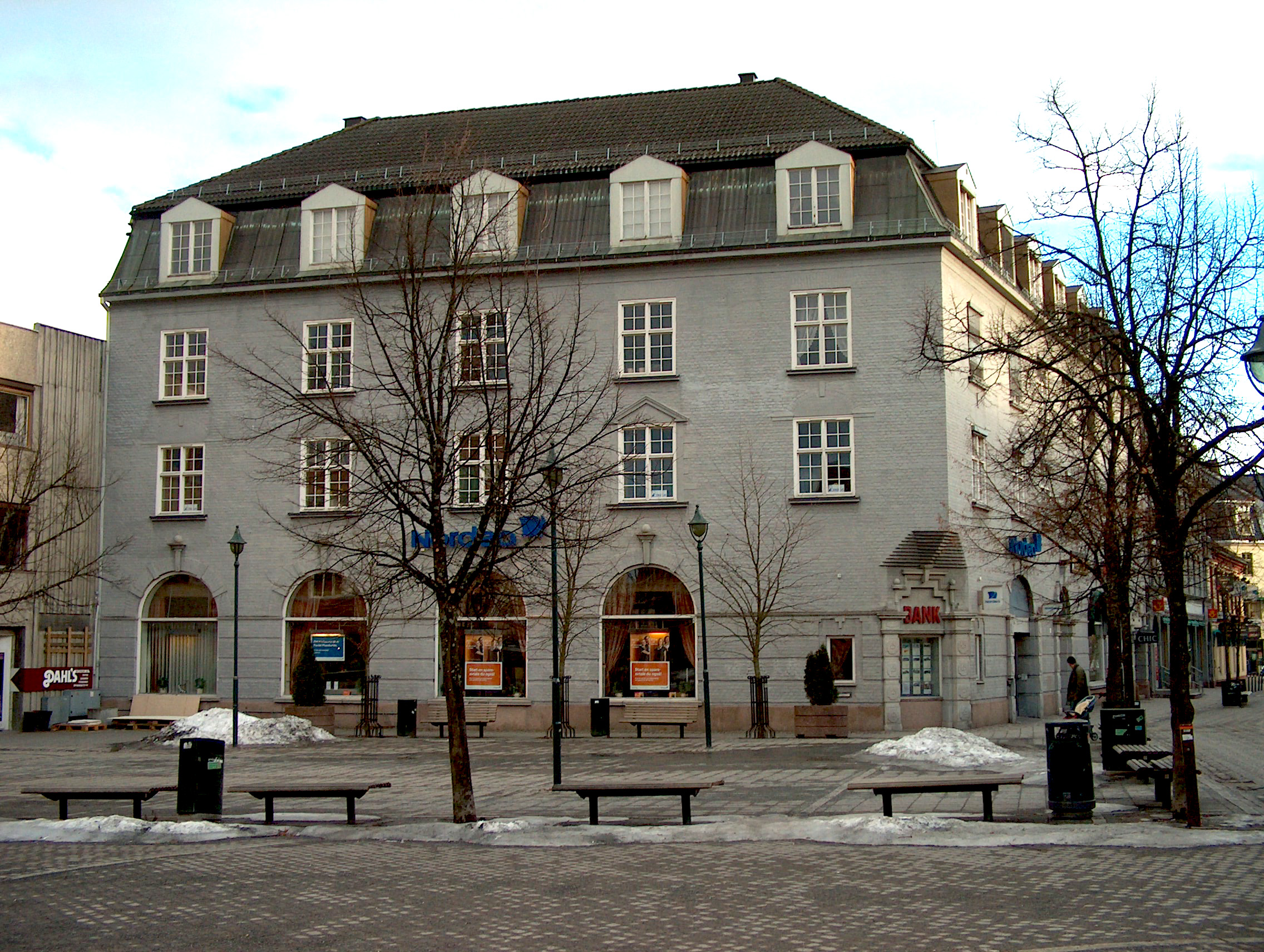
Storgaten 2

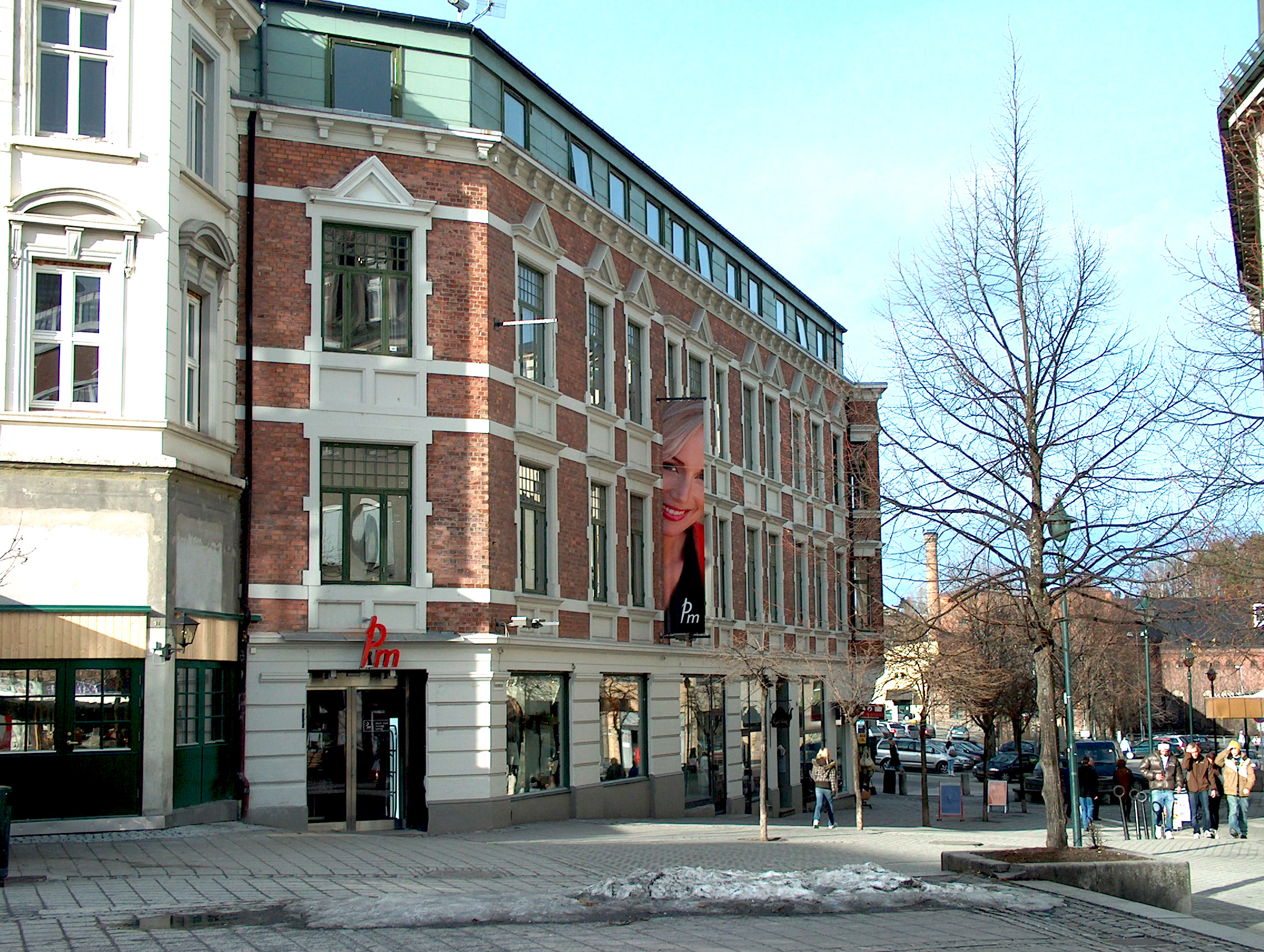
Thistedgaarden
