= 2010 Norwegian First Division =

1. divisjon
- Season: 2010
- Dates: 5 April – 7 November
- Champions: Sogndal
- Promoted: Sogndal; Sarpsborg 08; Fredrikstad
- Relegated: Follo FK; Tromsdalen; Moss; Lyn
- Matches played: 210
- Goals scored: 635 (3.02 per match)
- Top goalscorer: Marius Helle (17 goals)

Locations of the 2010 1. divisjon clubs

The 2010 1. divisjon (referred to as Adeccoligaen for sponsorship reasons) was a Norwegian second-tier football season. The season began play on 5 April 2010 and ended on 7 November 2010.

The clubs relegated from the Tippeligaen in 2009 were Fredrikstad (after relegation play-offs), Bodø/Glimt and Lyn. HamKam, Notodden, Stavanger and Skeid were relegated to the 2. divisjon in 2009 after finishing from thirteenth to sixteenth place respectively. Strømmen, Follo, Sandnes Ulf and Ranheim were promoted from the 2. divisjon in 2009.

At the end of the season, a two-legged promotion playoff was played between the 3rd, 4th, and 5th placed teams in the 1. divisjon and the 14th placed team in the Tippeligaen, Fredrikstad won this playoff against Hønefoss, and was promoted together with Sogndal and Sarpsborg 08.

FK Lyn elected to file for bankruptcy on 30 June, following an extended period of financial distress, and formally withdrew from the league on 7 July. Pursuant to the rules and regulations of the competition, all games involving Lyn was annulled and the team placed at the bottom of the standings.

Follo did not finish their licensing application for the 2011 season before the time limit of September 15, and were thus relegated at the end of the season even though they finished outside the relegation zone. As a result of this, Sandnes Ulf, which was the best placed team of those inside the relegation zone, avoided relegation. Tromsdalen and Moss were the remaining two teams relegated to the 2011 2. divisjon.

== Overview ==
Team	Location	Arena	Capacity	Manager
Alta	Alta	Finnmarkshallen	3,000	(Norway) Aasmund Bjørkan
Bodø/Glimt	Bodø	Aspmyra Stadion	7,354	(Norway) Kåre Ingebrigtsen
Bryne	Bryne	Bryne Stadion	10,000	(Norway) Tommy Bergersen
Follo	Ski	Ski Stadion	2,500	(Norway) Hans Erik Eriksen
Fredrikstad	Fredrikstad	Fredrikstad Stadion	12,560	(Norway) Tom Freddy Aune
Løv-Ham	Bergen	Varden Amfi	1,000	(Norway) Arne Sandstø
Mjøndalen	Mjøndalen	Nedre Eiker Stadion	2,600	(Norway) Vegard Hansen
Moss	Moss	Melløs Stadion	3,085	(Norway) Erik Holtan
Nybergsund	Trysil	Nybergsund Stadion	1,500	(Norway) Ola Brenden
Ranheim	Ranheim	DnB NOR Arena	1,000	(Norway) Per Joar Hansen
Sandnes Ulf	Sandnes	Sandnes Idrettspark	3,850	(Norway) Asle Andersen
Sarpsborg 08	Sarpsborg	Sarpsborg Stadion	5,500	(Norway) Roar Johansen
Sogndal	Sogndalsfjøra	Fosshaugane Campus	5,402	(Norway) Harald Aabrekk
Strømmen	Strømmen	Strømmen Stadion	1,800	(Norway) Petter Myhre (Norway) Thomas Berntsen
Tromsdalen	Tromsø	Tromsdalen Stadion	3,000	(Norway) Morten Pedersen

== League table ==
Pos	Team	Pld	W	D	L	GF	GA	GD	Pts	Promotion or relegation
1	Sogndal (C, P)	28	17	5	6	51	28	+23	56	Promotion to Tippeligaen
2	Sarpsborg 08 (P)	28	16	6	6	54	36	+18	54	Promotion to Tippeligaen
3	Fredrikstad (O, P)	28	14	8	6	53	37	+16	50	Qualification for the promotion play-offs
4	Løv-Ham	28	13	4	11	46	38	+8	43	Qualification for the promotion play-offs
5	Ranheim	28	12	7	9	37	38	−1	43	Qualification for the promotion play-offs
6	Bodø/Glimt	28	12	6	10	41	28	+13	42	
7	Strømmen	28	12	4	12	43	42	+1	40	
8	Alta	28	10	6	12	41	51	−10	36	
9	Bryne	28	10	5	13	57	52	+5	35	
10	Mjøndalen	28	10	5	13	41	49	−8	35	
11	Nybergsund	28	9	8	11	38	47	−9	35	
12	Follo (R)	28	8	8	12	35	43	−8	32	Relegation to Second Division (Note: Follo did not finish their licensing application for the 2011 season before the time limit of September 15, and were thus relegated at the end of the season even though they finished outside the relegation zone. As a result of this, Sandnes Ulf, which was the best placed team of those inside the relegation zone, avoided relegation.)
13	Sandnes Ulf	28	8	7	13	33	40	−7	31	
14	Tromsdalen (R)	28	8	4	16	33	50	−17	28	Relegation to Second Division
15	Moss (R)	28	7	5	16	32	56	−24	26	Relegation to Second Division
16	Lyn (D, R)	0	0	0	0	0	0	0	0	Relegation to Sixth Division (Note: FK Lyn elected to file for bankruptcy on 30 June, following an extended period of financial distress, and formally withdrew from the league on 7 July. Pursuant to the rules and regulations of the competition, all games involving Lyn have been annulled and the team placed at the bottom of the standings.)

Source: nifs.no
Rules for classification: 1) points; 2) goal difference; 3) number of goals scored.
(C) Champions; (D) Disqualified; (O) Play-off winners; (P) Promoted; (R) Relegated

== Results ==
Home \ Away	ALT	BOD	BRY	FOL	FFK	LØV	MIF	MFK	NIL	RIL	ULF	S08	SIL	SIF	TUIL
Alta	—	0–1	2–1	3–1	1–0	1–1	7–3	3–1	1–1	2–2	1–0	4–4	0–1	3–1	1–2
Bodø/Glimt	2–0	—	0–5	4–0	1–2	3–0	0–2	0–0	5–0	3–1	1–2	4–0	0–1	2–0	2–0
Bryne	4–1	1–2	—	5–1	2–2	2–5	5–1	5–0	5–1	0–1	1–3	3–1	2–5	1–2	0–1
Follo	0–0	1–1	0–0	—	1–2	0–1	2–0	0–4	1–1	0–1	1–3	2–2	1–1	2–0	4–0
Fredrikstad	3–0	0–0	3–0	1–3	—	1–0	3–3	1–1	2–2	2–3	3–1	1–1	2–0	1–0	2–1
Løv-Ham	4–2	0–1	1–2	1–3	0–1	—	0–2	3–0	3–1	1–1	2–2	2–1	2–0	1–2	0–0
Mjøndalen	0–1	1–0	3–1	0–0	2–5	0–2	—	1–3	3–1	1–0	2–2	3–1	0–1	0–0	4–0
Moss	2–0	2–1	0–3	1–2	2–5	1–3	1–1	—	0–1	1–3	1–0	0–2	1–4	2–0	0–0
Nybergsund	0–1	2–2	2–2	4–1	0–0	1–4	2–1	4–2	—	3–1	0–1	2–3	0–2	0–2	1–0
Ranheim	2–0	2–1	1–0	1–0	2–2	1–3	2–1	1–0	0–2	—	3–1	0–3	2–2	0–0	2–2
Sandnes Ulf	2–2	1–1	1–2	3–2	0–1	1–2	0–2	1–2	1–1	1–1	—	2–3	0–0	0–1	2–1
Sarpsborg 08	4–0	1–1	0–0	0–0	3–0	3–2	1–0	4–1	1–0	3–1	2–1	—	4–0	0–3	1–0
Sogndal	2–1	1–0	2–2	4–3	2–0	2–0	3–0	2–0	1–1	2–1	0–1	1–2	—	5–1	5–0
Strømmen	6–1	2–1	6–3	0–2	3–2	2–3	1–2	2–2	1–3	1–0	2–0	2–1	1–2	—	2–2
Tromsdalen	0–2	1–2	5–0	0–2	2–5	2–0	5–3	4–2	1–2	1–2	0–1	1–3	1–0	1–0	—

Source: NIFS (in Norwegian)
Legend: Blue = home team win; Yellow = draw; Red = away team win.

== Promotion play-offs ==
The third-placed team in 1. divisjon, Fredrikstad, took part in a two-legged play-off against the 14th-placed team in Tippeligaen, Hønefoss.

First leg

21 November 2010
15:00 CET (UTC+1)

Hønefoss	1–4	Fredrikstad
Saaliti 29'	Report	Piiroja 6'; Borges 16'; Askar 19'; Valencia 75'

Aka Arena, Hønefoss
Attendance: 2,885
Referee: Tommy Skjerven

Second leg

25 November 2010
20:00 CET (UTC+1)

Fredrikstad	4–0	Hønefoss
Borges 39', 54', 66'; Piiroja 42'	Report

Fredrikstad Stadion, Fredrikstad
Attendance: 9,201
Referee: Svein Oddvar Moen

Fredrikstad won 8–1 on aggregate and were promoted to the 2011 Tippeligaen; Hønefoss were relegated to the 1. divisjon.

== Top goalscorers ==
Rank	Scorer	Club	Goals
1	(Norway) Marius Helle	Bryne	17
2	(Norway) Andreas Moen	Strømmen	16
3	(Norway) Sindre Marøy	Løv-Ham	15
4	(Costa Rica) Celso Borges	Fredrikstad	14
4	(Norway) Morten Eriksen	Sandnes Ulf	14
6	(Norway) Eirik Markegård	Follo	13
6	(Nigeria) Kim Ojo	Nybergsund	13
6	(Norway) Espen Olsen	Sogndal	13
9	(Norway) Erik Midtgarden	Mjøndalen	12
10	(Norway) Morten Giæver	Sarpsborg 08	11

Source: NRK Sport
