= Alex Valencia =

Norwegian footballer (born 1979)

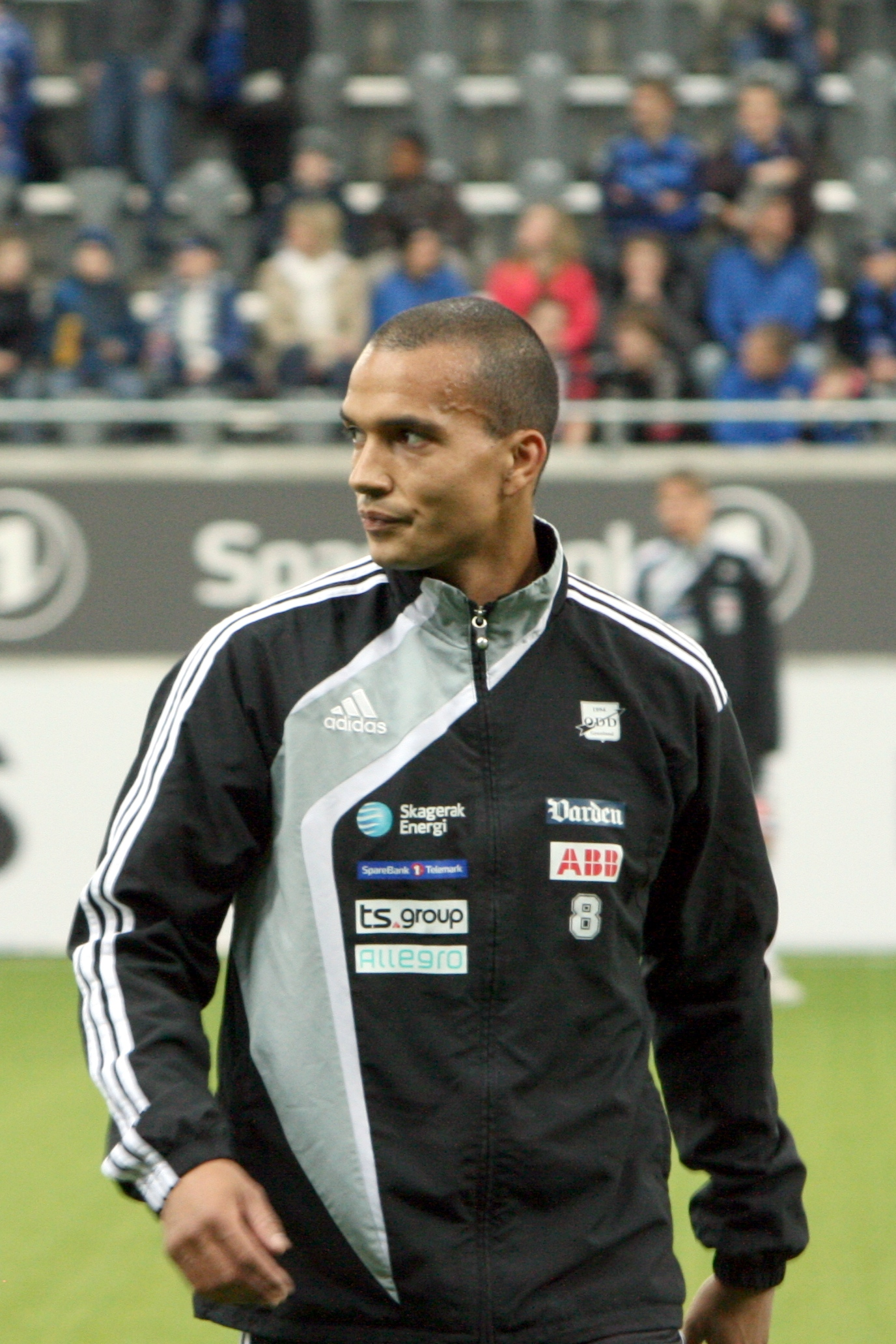

Personal information
- Full name: Alex Marcel Lund Valencia
- Date of birth: 22 September 1979 (age 47)
- Place of birth: Bergen, Norway
- Height: 1.81 m (5 ft 11 in)
- Position: Right winger

Youth career
- Åsane
- KIL/Hemne
- Åsane

Senior career*
Years	Team	Apps	(Gls)
–1998	Åsane		
1998–2003	Brann	80	(7)
2004–2007	Start	77	(11)
2007–2008	AGF	24	(2)
2008–2009	Odd Grenland	24	(0)
2009–2012	Fredrikstad	54	(5)
2013	Åsane	9	(4)

International career
1995	Norway U15	1	(0)
1997	Norway U17	4	(2)
2001	Norway U21	8	(2)
2001–2006	Norway	5	(0)
2002	Norway B	1	(0)
	Norway futsal	8	(5)
- * Club domestic league appearances and goals

Alex Marcel Lund Valencia (born 22 September 1979) is a Norwegian footballer who plays as a right winger for Åsane. He has previously played for top-flight clubs in Norway and Denmark. Valencia is of Colombian descent and has been capped for the Norwegian national team in both football and futsal.

== Early life ==
Valencia is son of the former Tromsø IL player Arnt Hugo Lund, who played approximately 300 matches between 1998 and 2013. Valencia was born after his father and his Colombian mother moved to Bergen to study. He lived in Bergen and played for Åsane for his entire childhood, with the exception of a short stay in Trøndelag where he played youth-football for KIL/Hemne. Valencia was known as one of the most talented footballers in Hordaland and transferred from Åsane to Brann in 1998.

== Club career ==
Valencia made his debut in Tippeligaen against Tromsø on 7 May 1998, and became a regular in Teitur Thordarson's team during the 2000 season. He made his break-through the following season and played every match for Brann in Tippeligaen. Valencia was primarily used as a right winger, but was also used occasionally as a striker. After Mons Ivar Mjelde became head coach of Brann, Valencia lost his spot in the starting line-up and received less playing time. Valencia played a total of 106 matches and scored 12 goals for Brann and moved to the First Division side Start after the 2003 season.

When signing for Start, the Director of Sports, Erik Solér stated that Valencia had the potential to play for the Norwegian national team. Start won promotion to Tippeligaen with Tom Nordlie as head coach in Valencia's first season with the club, and the following season the newly promoted side finished second in the 2005 Tippeligaen. Valencia was one of the biggest contributors to the surprising silver medals, and the right winger was named "Player of the Year" in Tippeligaen by Fædrelandsvennen, Nettavisen and Verdens Gang. Valencia scored a total of 11 goals in 77 league-matches for Start, and moved to the Danish Superliga side AGF Aarhus in July 2007.

Valencia's spell in Denmark was not a success, and he was named the third worst signing in the 2007–08 Danish Superliga by Ekstrabladet in October 2007. He only played 90 minutes for AGF twice, and scored a total of 2 goals in 23 matches for the club, before he returned Norway where he joined the First Division side Odd Grenland in August 2008. Valencia never became a regular in Odd's team, and was sold to Fredrikstad in August 2009, where he was reunited with the head coach from Start, Tom Nordlie. Valencia played for Fredrikstad until the end of the 2012 season when his contract expired, and the club who had been relegated to the second tier did not want to renew his contract. Valencia returned to his youth-club Åsane ahead of the 2013 season, and got a job as a car-salesman in addition to playing for the team in the 2. divisjon.

== International career ==
Valencia first represented Norway when he played one match for the under-15 team in 1995. He played four matches and scored two goals for the under-17 team in 1997, before he represented the under-21 team in 2001 where he scored two goals in eight appearances. Valencia made his debut for the Norwegian national team against Turkey in August 2001. The next year he made one appearance for Norway B. Valencia was not called up for the national team until April 2005, when he was included in the squad that met Estonia in a friendly match. He was capped twice in both 2005 and 2006, and earned a total of five caps for Norway.

== Futsal career ==
Valencia has also played futsal, and was included in Norwegian national futsal team's first squad in 2003, along with other Tippeligaen players like Kristofer Hæstad, Fredrik Strømstad and Espen Edvardsen. Valencia scored one of the goals in the 7–5 victory against Canada in the 2003 Futsal World Cup, which was Norway's first victory in an international futsal tournament.

== Career statistics ==
Season	Club	Division	League		Cup		Total	
Season	Club	Division	Apps	Goals	Apps	Goals	Apps	Goals
1998	Brann	Tippeligaen	3	0	0	0	3	0
1999	Brann	Tippeligaen	1	0	2	1	3	1
2000	Brann	Tippeligaen	15	1	1	0	16	1
2001	Brann	Tippeligaen	26	1	5	2	31	3
2002	Brann	Tippeligaen	21	3	4	1	25	4
2003	Brann	Tippeligaen	14	2	4	1	18	3
2004	Start	Adeccoligaen	22	2	2	2	24	4
2005	Start	Tippeligaen	26	6	4	2	30	8
2006	Start	Tippeligaen	21	2	3	3	24	5
2007	Start	Tippeligaen	8	1	2	1	10	2
2007–08	AGF	Superliga	23	2	0	0	23	2
2008–09	AGF	Superliga	1	0	0	0	1	0
2008	Odd Grenland	Adeccoligaen	9	0	2	0	11	0
2009	Odd Grenland	Tippeligaen	15	0	1	0	16	0
2009	Fredrikstad	Tippeligaen	6	1	0	0	6	1
2010	Fredrikstad	Adeccoligaen	22	2	2	3	24	5
2011	Fredrikstad	Tippeligaen	9	0	3	1	12	1
2012	Fredrikstad	Tippeligaen	17	2	1	0	18	2
2013	Åsane	2. divisjon	9	4	0	0	9	4
Career Total			268	29	36	17	304	46
