= 2011 Tippeligaen =

67th season of top-tier football league in Norway

Tippeligaen
- Season: 2011
- Dates: 20 March – 27 November
- Champions: Molde; 1st title
- Relegated: Start; Sarpsborg 08
- Champions League: Molde
- Europa League: Aalesund; Tromsø; Rosenborg; Stabæk
- Matches: 240
- Goals: 708 (2.95 per match)
- Top goalscorer: Mostafa Abdellaoue (17 goals)
- Biggest home win: Rosenborg 7–0 Odd Grenland (29 August 2011)
- Biggest away win: Stabæk 0–7 Lillestrøm (20 March 2011)
- Highest scoring: Rosenborg 3–6 Brann (30 October 2011)
- Longest winning run: 5 games Molde; Odd Grenland
- Longest unbeaten run: 10 games Molde; Tromsø
- Longest winless run: 21 games Sarpsborg 08
- Longest losing run: 7 games Sarpsborg 08
- Highest attendance: 20,710; Rosenborg 0–1 Haugesund (16 May 2011)
- Lowest attendance: 1,884; Sogndal 3–1 Haugesund (16 June 2011)
- Average attendance: 7,990 ▼1.5%

The 2011 Tippeligaen was the 67th completed season of top division football in Norway. The competition began on 20 March 2011 and ended on 27 November 2011. Rosenborg were the defending champions, having secured their twenty-second League Championship on 24 October 2010. Sogndal, Sarpsborg 08 and Fredrikstad entered as the three promoted teams from the 2010 1. divisjon. They replaced Hønefoss, Kongsvinger and Sandefjord who were relegated to the 2011 1. divisjon.

Molde won their first ever Eliteserien title with two games to spare. Molde's 58 points was a record low for an Eliteserien champion in the current 16-team system.

The fastest goal in Norwegian top division history was scored this season on 15 April by Erik Mjelde in a 3–3 draw between his side Brann and Haugesund after 11 seconds.

== Overview ==
At the end of the season, Sarpsborg 08 and Start were relegated to the 2012 1. divisjon, due to having finished in the bottom two positions in the standings. There was no two-legged promotion play-offs this season.

On 30 October 2011, Molde became champions with two games to spare after their only remaining challenger, Rosenborg, lost 3–6 to Brann in the 28th round of the series. The trophy was their first ever league championship.

== Teams ==
Sixteen teams competed in the league – the top thirteen teams from the previous season, and the three teams promoted from 1. divisjon. The promoted teams were Sogndal, Sarpsborg 08 and Fredrikstad. This was Sarpsborg 08's first top-flight season, while Sogndal and Fredrikstad returned to the top flight after an absence of six years and one season respectively. They replaced Hønefoss (returning after their debut season in the first tier), Kongsvinger (relegated after a season's presence) and Sandefjord (relegated after two years in the top flight).

=== Stadiums and locations ===
Locations of the teams in 2011 Tippeligaen

Note: Table lists in alphabetical order.

Team	Ap.	Location	Stadium	Turf	Capacity	Manager
Aalesund	10	Ålesund	Color Line Stadion	Artificial	10,778	(Norway) Kjetil Rekdal
Brann	55	Bergen	Brann Stadion	Natural	17,824	(Norway) Rune Skarsfjord
Fredrikstad	41	Fredrikstad	Fredrikstad Stadion	Natural	13,300	(Norway) Tom Freddy Aune
Haugesund	5	Haugesund	Haugesund stadion	Natural	5,000	(Norway) Jostein Grindhaug
Lillestrøm	48	Lillestrøm	Åråsen stadion	Natural	11,637	(Norway) Henning Berg
Molde	35	Molde	Aker Stadion	Natural	11,800	(Norway) Ole Gunnar Solskjær
Odd Grenland	30	Skien	Skagerak Arena	Artificial	13,500	(Norway) Dag-Eilev Fagermo
Rosenborg	48	Trondheim	Lerkendal stadion	Natural	21,850	(Sweden) Jan Jönsson
Sarpsborg 08	1	Sarpsborg	Sarpsborg Stadion	Artificial	5,000	(Norway) Roar Johansen
Sogndal	13	Sogndalsfjøra	Fosshaugane Campus	Natural	5,402	(Norway) Harald Aabrekk
Stabæk	16	Bærum	Telenor Arena	Artificial	15,500	(Sweden) Jörgen Lennartsson
Start	36	Kristiansand	Sør Arena	Natural	14,300	(Norway) Mons Ivar Mjelde
Strømsgodset	24	Drammen	Marienlyst Stadion	Artificial	7,500	(Norway) Ronny Deila
Tromsø	25	Tromsø	Alfheim Stadion	Artificial	7,500	(Norway) Per Mathias Høgmo
Vålerenga	51	Oslo	Ullevaal Stadion	Natural	25,572	(Norway) Martin Andresen
Viking	62	Stavanger	Viking Stadion	Natural	16,600	(Norway) Åge Hareide

=== Managerial changes ===
Team	Outgoing manager	Manner of departure	Date of vacancy	Table	Incoming manager	Date of appointment	Table
Rosenborg	(Norway) Nils Arne Eggen	End of contract	31 December 2010	Pre-Season	(Sweden) Jan Jönsson	1 January 2011	Pre-Season
Stabæk	(Sweden) Jan Jönsson	Signed by Rosenborg	31 December 2010	Pre-Season	(Sweden) Jörgen Lennartsson	1 January 2011	Pre-Season
Molde	(Germany) Uwe Rösler	End of contract	31 December 2010	Pre-Season	(Norway) Ole Gunnar Solskjær	1 January 2011	Pre-Season
Start	(Norway) Knut Tørum	Resigned	22 June 2011	15th	(Norway) Mons Ivar Mjelde	12 July 2011	14th
Lillestrøm	(Norway) Henning Berg	Sacked	27 October 2011	12th	(Norway) Petter Belsvik (caretaker)	27 October 2011	12th

== League table ==
Pos	Team	Pld	W	D	L	GF	GA	GD	Pts	Qualification or relegation
1	Molde (C)	30	17	7	6	54	38	+16	58	Qualification for the Champions League second qualifying round
2	Tromsø	30	15	8	7	56	34	+22	53	Qualification for the Europa League second qualifying round
3	Rosenborg	30	14	7	9	69	44	+25	49	Qualification for the Europa League first qualifying round
4	Brann	30	14	6	10	51	49	+2	48	
5	Odd Grenland	30	14	6	10	44	44	0	48	
6	Haugesund	30	14	5	11	55	43	+12	47	
7	Vålerenga	30	14	5	11	42	33	+9	47	
8	Strømsgodset	30	12	9	9	44	43	+1	45	
9	Aalesund	30	12	7	11	36	38	−2	43	Qualification for the Europa League second qualifying round (Note: Aalesund qualified for the second qualifying round of the UEFA Europa League as winners of the 2011 Norwegian Cup.)
10	Stabæk	30	11	6	13	44	50	−6	39	Qualification for the Europa League first qualifying round (Note: Stabæk qualified for the first qualifying round of the UEFA Europa League via the UEFA Fair Play ranking.)
11	Viking	30	9	10	11	33	40	−7	37	
12	Fredrikstad	30	10	6	14	38	41	−3	36	
13	Lillestrøm	30	9	7	14	46	52	−6	34	
14	Sogndal	30	8	10	12	24	31	−7	34	
15	Start (R)	30	7	5	18	39	61	−22	26	Relegation to First Division
16	Sarpsborg 08 (R)	30	5	6	19	31	65	−34	21	Relegation to First Division

Source: fotball.no
Rules for classification: 1) points; 2) goal difference; 3) number of goals scored.
(C) Champions; (R) Relegated

== Positions by round ==
Team ╲ Round	1	2	3	4	5	6	7	8	9	10	11	12	13	14	15	16	17	18	19	20	21	22	23	24	25	26	27	28	29	30
Molde	15	13	14	10	8	10	7	4	5	5	2	1	2	1	1	1	1	1	1	1	1	1	1	1	1	1	1	1	1	1
Tromsø	3	4	1	4	2	2	1	1	1	1	1	2	1	2	2	2	2	2	3	2	2	2	2	2	3	2	2	2	2	2
Rosenborg	9	14	15	15	12	11	12	11	13	14	12	9	11	11	10	9	7	8	8	8	7	4	4	3	2	4	4	3	5	3
Brann	6	2	3	5	9	4	2	5	8	6	6	7	5	3	3	4	4	3	2	3	3	3	3	4	5	6	5	4	3	4
Odd Grenland	12	7	12	12	13	12	11	12	14	13	15	13	12	12	12	13	13	13	13	11	14	11	9	8	6	7	6	5	4	5
Haugesund	12	8	11	11	14	15	14	15	10	7	9	6	9	10	8	11	8	6	6	7	8	5	7	7	7	5	8	8	7	6
Vålerenga	3	3	4	6	10	13	13	13	11	11	13	11	7	9	11	10	11	11	12	9	9	8	5	5	4	3	3	6	8	7
Strømsgodset	6	11	7	3	1	1	4	2	2	2	3	4	4	5	4	3	3	4	5	6	5	6	6	6	8	8	7	7	6	8
Aalesund	9	15	13	13	11	6	5	8	4	3	4	3	3	4	5	8	10	10	10	10	12	12	12	12	11	10	9	9	9	9
Stabæk	16	12	8	8	6	3	6	3	3	4	5	5	6	7	9	7	5	7	7	4	4	7	8	9	9	9	10	10	10	10
Viking	12	10	10	14	15	14	15	16	16	16	16	15	15	14	15	12	12	12	11	13	10	10	11	11	10	12	11	11	11	11
Fredrikstad	6	9	6	2	5	5	3	7	6	8	8	12	8	6	7	6	9	9	9	12	11	13	13	13	13	14	14	13	12	12
Lillestrøm	1	5	9	9	7	7	9	10	9	10	10	8	10	8	6	5	6	5	4	5	6	9	10	10	12	11	12	12	13	13
Sogndal	9	16	16	16	16	16	16	14	15	15	14	16	16	16	16	15	14	14	14	14	13	14	14	14	14	13	13	14	14	14
Start	3	1	2	1	3	8	10	9	12	12	11	14	14	15	14	16	16	16	16	16	15	15	15	15	15	15	15	15	15	15
Sarpsborg 08	2	6	5	7	4	9	8	6	7	9	7	10	13	13	16	14	15	15	15	15	16	16	16	16	16	16	16	16	16	16

Source: rsssf.no

== Results ==
Home \ Away	AAL	SKB	FFK	HAU	LSK	MFK	ODD	RBK	S08	SIL	STB	IKS	SIF	TIL	VIF	VIK
Aalesund	—	3–1	1–2	1–0	1–0	1–3	0–1	1–3	2–0	1–0	2–0	0–0	2–1	1–0	2–1	2–0
Brann	1–1	—	0–1	1–0	2–0	1–3	2–0	2–1	1–0	2–0	2–1	2–1	0–0	1–1	1–4	3–2
Fredrikstad	3–1	4–2	—	1–0	1–1	0–1	0–1	2–0	1–1	2–2	1–2	1–1	1–1	0–2	3–1	0–1
Haugesund	1–0	3–3	3–2	—	2–0	5–0	2–1	2–2	4–2	4–0	3–4	1–0	5–1	1–1	1–1	2–0
Lillestrøm	1–1	1–4	0–0	5–0	—	0–3	1–1	2–5	3–1	0–3	1–1	2–1	4–2	3–2	0–1	2–1
Molde	5–2	2–2	2–1	3–1	1–0	—	0–0	0–2	3–1	2–0	3–2	5–1	2–2	2–2	2–1	0–0
Odd Grenland	2–2	2–3	2–1	1–0	1–3	1–0	—	3–3	1–0	1–0	2–3	0–2	1–0	3–1	1–1	4–2
Rosenborg	2–2	3–6	2–0	0–1	4–4	3–1	7–0	—	4–0	2–1	1–2	4–1	2–0	3–1	2–0	3–2
Sarpsborg 08	2–0	3–5	1–4	0–3	2–4	3–0	3–2	0–6	—	1–0	1–1	2–0	1–1	0–2	0–2	1–1
Sogndal	0–0	1–0	0–1	3–1	2–0	2–1	1–4	1–1	1–0	—	0–0	2–0	1–1	0–0	0–1	0–0
Stabæk	1–2	1–1	3–1	1–2	0–7	1–1	1–3	2–1	2–0	0–1	—	4–1	2–0	2–4	1–0	0–1
Start	2–3	3–1	3–2	1–4	3–0	1–2	1–3	1–1	1–0	1–1	2–4	—	5–1	1–6	0–2	4–0
Strømsgodset	2–2	1–0	1–0	3–1	3–1	0–1	2–0	3–1	5–2	2–1	1–0	3–0	—	1–1	2–1	2–2
Tromsø	1–0	4–0	3–1	2–0	1–0	0–2	2–1	3–1	2–2	0–0	3–3	2–0	2–0	—	4–1	3–1
Vålerenga	2–0	0–2	1–2	3–2	1–1	1–2	0–1	1–0	2–0	1–1	2–0	2–1	2–2	2–0	—	3–0
Viking	1–0	3–0	2–0	1–1	2–0	2–2	1–1	0–0	2–2	2–0	1–0	1–1	0–1	2–1	0–2	—

Source: NIFS (in Norwegian)
Legend: Blue = home team win; Yellow = draw; Red = away team win.

== Season statistics ==
=== Top scorers ===
Rank	Scorer	Club	Goals	Games	Average
1	(Norway) Mostafa Abdellaoue	Tromsø	17	29	0.59
2	(Sweden) Rade Prica	Rosenborg	16	27	0.59
2	(Norway) Ole Martin Årst	Start	16	30	0.53
4	(Nigeria) Kim Ojo	Brann	15	28	0.54
5	(Nigeria) Anthony Ujah	Lillestrøm	13	12	1.08
5	(Norway) Tarik Elyounoussi	Fredrikstad	13	28	0.46
7	(Senegal) Pape Paté Diouf	Molde	12	14	0.86
7	(Norway) Mushaga Bakenga	Rosenborg	12	26	0.46
7	(Serbia) Nikola Đurđić	Haugesund	12	27	0.44
7	(Iceland) Veigar Páll Gunnarsson	Vålerenga†	12	29	0.41
11	(Norway) Espen Hoff	Start	11	29	0.38
11	(Norway) Alexander Søderlund	Haugesund	11	29	0.38

†Veigar Páll Gunnarsson scored nine goals in sixteen games for Stabæk.

Source: Alt om fotball

=== Discipline ===
==== Player ====
- Most yellow cards: 10
  - (Nigeria) Fegor Ogude (Vålerenga)
- Most red cards: 1
  - 21 players

==== Club ====
- Most yellow cards: 59
  - Vålerenga
- Most red cards: 4
  - Fredrikstad
  - Lillestrøm

=== Attendances ===
Pos	Team	Total	High	Low	Average	Change
1	Rosenborg	217,664	20,710	11,433	14,511	−14.2%
2	Vålerenga	199,962	20,012	10,421	13,331	−2.3%
3	Brann	195,173	17,237	10,120	13,012	−5.2%
4	Viking	153,825	12,584	8,898	10,255	−11.1%
5	Molde	147,273	11,292	8,158	9,818	+16.7%
6	Aalesund	143,480	10,677	8,783	9,565	−5.7%
7	Fredrikstad	136,790	12,565	6,863	9,119	+34.0%^{1}
8	Stabæk	111,165	11,930	5,686	7,411	−9.1%
9	Start	105,843	11,419	5,128	7,056	−15.9%
10	Lillestrøm	88,942	8,852	4,401	5,929	−9.8%
11	Odd Grenland	85,718	7,106	4,499	5,715	−13.8%
12	Strømsgodset	85,606	6,426	5,052	5,707	−2.6%
13	Tromsø	72,991	6,535	3,772	4,866	+3.6%
14	Haugesund	68,248	5,000	4,082	4,550	−2.4%
15	Sarpsborg 08	57,283	4,760	2,798	3,819	+49.9%^{1}
16	Sogndal	47,708	5,623	1,884	3,181	+58.7%^{1}
	League total	1,917,671	20,710	1,884	7,990	−1.5%

Source: nifs.no
Notes:
1: Team played last season in 1. divisjon.

== Awards ==
=== Annual awards ===
==== Goalkeeper of the Year ====
The Goalkeeper of the Year awarded to (Norway) Espen Bugge Pettersen (Molde)

==== Defender of the Year ====
The Defender of the Year awarded to (Norway) Even Hovland (Sogndal)

==== Midfielder of the Year ====
The Midfielder of the Year awarded to (Costa Rica) Michael Barrantes (Aalesunds)

==== Striker of the Year ====
The Striker of the Year awarded to (Serbia) Nikola Đurđić (Haugesund)

==== Coach of the Year ====
The Coach of the Year awarded to (Norway) Ole Gunnar Solskjær (Molde)
