= Brogeland =

Brogeland is a Norwegian surname. Notable people with the surname include:

- Boye Brogeland (born 1973), Norwegian bridge player
- Per Brogeland (born 1953), Norwegian football manager
