= Thomas Berntsen =

Norwegian footballer and coach (born 1970)

Personal information
- Full name: Thomas Edvin Berntsen
- Date of birth: 31 July 1970 (age 56)
- Place of birth: Oslo, Norway
- Position: Defender

Team information
- Current team: Brøndby (Head of Recruitment)

Youth career
- Strømmen

Senior career*
| Years | Team | Apps | (Gls) |
| –1992 | Strømmen | 66 | (1) |
| 1993–1996 | Lillestrøm | 65 | (1) |
| 1997–1999 | Vålerenga | 44 | (0) |
| 2000 | SW Bregenz | 3 | (0) |
| 2000 | Bryne | 5 | (0) |
| 2001 | Bærum | | |

Managerial career
- 2006: Lørenskog
- 2007–2008: Kongsvinger
- 2008–2011: Strømmen
- 2013–2023: Sarpsborg 08 (director of sports)
- 2023–2026: AIK (director of sports)
- 2026–: Brøndby (Head of Recruitment)
- * Club domestic league appearances and goals

Thomas Edvin Berntsen (born 31 July 1970) is a Norwegian football manager, sporting director and former football defender. As a player, Berntsen is most notable for his time at Lillestrøm and Vålerenga in Tippeligaen and the Austrian club Bregenz. After his retirement he has been head coach of Lørenskog, Kongsvinger and Strømmen.

== Playing career ==
He was born in Oslo, and started his career in Strømmen before he moved to Lillestrøm where he played 65 matches in Tippeligaen from 1993 to 1996. He then moved to Vålerenga where he played 45 league-matches between 1997 and 1999 and also won the Norwegian Football Cup in 1997.

In 2000, Berntsen moved to the Austrian club SW Bregenz, where his former teammate from Lillestrøm, Jan Ove Pedersen also were playing. After playing three matches in six months for Bregenz, he was loaned out to Bryne where he played five matches in Tippeligaen before he retired after one season with Bærum in 2001 Norwegian Second Division.

== Managerial career ==
In 2006, Berntsen was the head coach of the third-tier club Lørenskog and John Carew's youth club was fighting promotion alongside Notodden. In the decisive match of 2006 Norwegian Second Division, Notodden won 5–3 against Lørenskog at home, and was promoted to Adeccoligaen.

Even though Lørenskog was not promoted, Berntsen was head coach of a second-tier team in 2007 since Kongsvinger hired him as Vegard Skogheim's successor on 6 November 2006. Berntsen led Kongsvinger to a strong fourth place in 2007 Adeccoligaen, two points behind Bryne which played promotion play-off. With two points in the six first matches of the 2008-season, and Kongsvinger positioned at the bottom of the table, Berntsen was fired on 7 May 2008.

On 3 August 2008 he was hired as head coach of his youth-club Strømmen, and saved the club from relegation to Norwegian Third Division. Ahead of the 2009-season, Petter Myhre was named co-coach together with Berntsen. With Berntsen and Myhre as coaches, Strømmen won their 2009 Norwegian Second Division group and was promoted to Adeccoligaen. In 2010 Strømmen finished three points behind the play-off promotion. The next season, Myhre had resigned from the job at Strømmen and was replaced by Andreas Holter which would be leading Strømmen together with Berntsen. In the decisive match of the 2011 season, Strømmen avoided relegation with a 6–1 win against Nybergsund.

In July 2011, Nettavisen named Berntsen as one of the most talented football-coaches in Norway. Berntsen's contract ended after the 2011 season, and he was replaced by Erland Johnsen. In December 2011, Berntsen was linked to the vacant job as head coach of the Eliteserien club Stabæk, but according to TV 2 Berntsen rejected Stabæk's offer.

Ahead of the 2013 season he was named as director of sports in Sarpsborg 08 FF. The club reached its all-time high, participating in the 2018–19 UEFA Europa League group stage. Berntsen was credited for large discoveries and subsequent sales, such as Krépin Diatta and Ismaila Coulibaly.

In 2023 Berntsen accepted a contract offer from Swedish club AIK to become their new director of sports.

On March 18, 2026 Berntsen accepted a contract offer from Danish club Brøndby to become their new Head of Recruitment.
