= Sindre Marøy =

Norwegian footballer (born 1982)

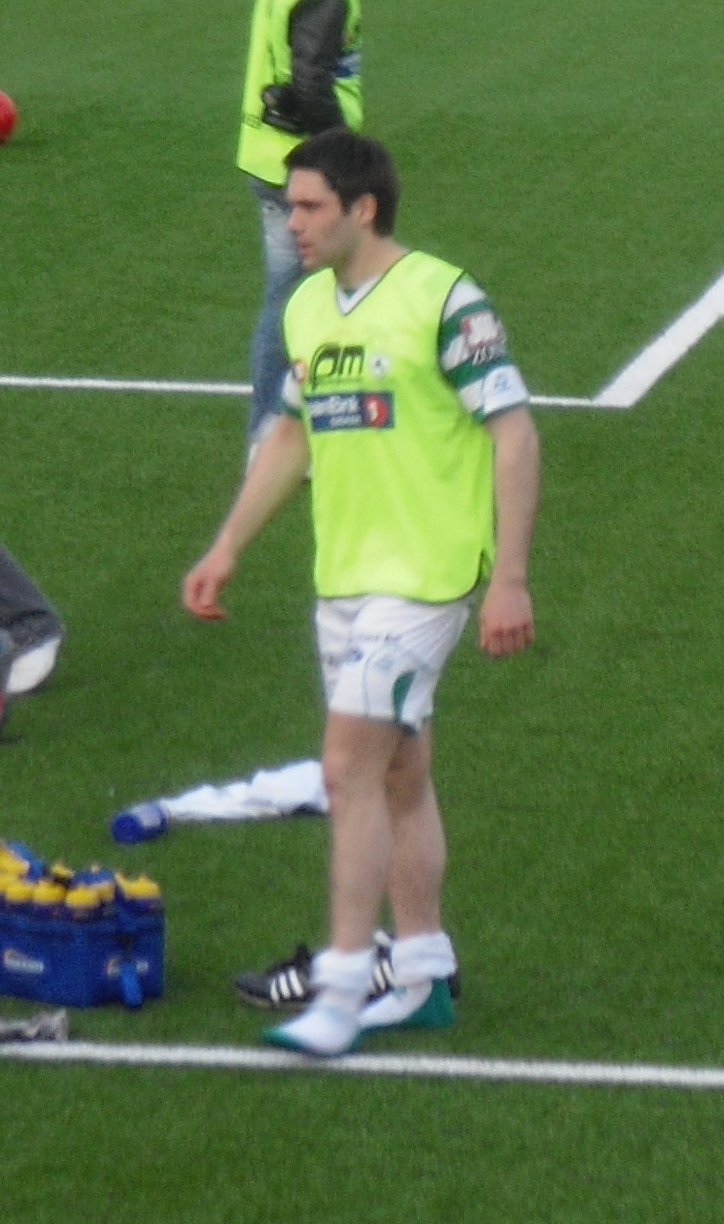
- Sindre Marøy

Personal information
- Full name: Sindre Alf Marøy
- Date of birth: 9 June 1982 (age 44)
- Place of birth: Bergen, Norway
- Height: 1.81 m (5 ft 11 1/2 in)
- Position: Striker

Youth career
- Radøy/Manger

Senior career*
Years	Team	Apps	(Gls)
- Radøy/Manger
2001–2002	Brann	4	(0)
- Radøy/Manger
2006–2010	Løv-Ham	107	(32)
- Radøy/Manger
- * Club domestic league appearances and goals

Sindre Marøy (born 9 June 1982) is a Norwegian former professional footballer who played as a forward.

He hails from Hordabø and works as an engineer. He had several spells in Radøy/Manger and also played on higher levels for SK Brann and Løv-Ham. After being Løv-Ham's league top scorer in 2010, he left the club. After he retired from professional football, he rejoined the amateur side Radøy/Manger FK.

== Career statistics ==
Season	Club	Division	League		Cup		Total	
Season	Club	Division	Apps	Goals	Apps	Goals	Apps	Goals
2001	Brann	Tippeligaen	3	0	3	0	3	0
2002	Brann	Tippeligaen	1	0	0	0	1	0
2006	Løv-Ham	Adeccoligaen	10	2	0	0	10	2
2007	Løv-Ham	Adeccoligaen	22	5	3	2	25	7
2008	Løv-Ham	Adeccoligaen	25	7	1	1	26	8
2009	Løv-Ham	Adeccoligaen	23	3	2	0	24	3
2010	Løv-Ham	Adeccoligaen	27	15	3	2	30	17
Career Total			111	32	12	5	120	37
