= Einar Bruno Larsen =

Norwegian footballer and ice hockey player (1939–2021)

Personal information
- Date of birth: 17 November 1939
- Place of birth: Oslo, Norway
- Date of death: 21 July 2021 (aged 81)
- Position: Striker

Senior career*
Years	Team	Apps	(Gls)
1957–1968	Vålerenga		

International career
1957	Norway U19	1	(0)
1960–1961	Norway U21	2	(0)
1963–1965	Norway B	4	(2)
1959–1964	Norway	3	(1)
- * Club domestic league appearances and goals

Einar Bruno Larsen (17 November 1939 – 27 July 2021) was a Norwegian footballer and ice hockey player.

He played for the Norwegian national ice hockey team, and participated at the Winter Olympics in 1964. He was awarded Gullpucken as best Norwegian ice hockey player in 1963. He also represented the Norway national football team on three occasions between 1959 and 1964, scoring one goal. He spent his senior career in Vålerengen.

He died on 27 July 2021.
