= Kongsvinger IL Toppfotball =

Association football club in Kongsvinger, Norway

Kongsvinger
- Full name: Kongsvinger IL Toppfotball
- Nickname: KIL
- Founded: 31 January 1892; 134 years ago
- Ground: Gjemselund Stadion; Kongsvinger
- Capacity: 5,824
- Head coach: Johan Wennberg
- League: 1. divisjon
- 2026: 1. divisjon, 3rd of 16
Home colours	Away colours

Kongsvinger IL Toppfotball is a Norwegian professional football club from the town of Kongsvinger in Innlandet, founded in 1892. Its home ground is Gjemselund Stadion. It is part of sporting association, Kongsvinger IL.

== Honours ==
- Norwegian top flight
  - Runners-up (1): 1992
  - Third place (2): 1986, 1987
- Norwegian Cup
  - Runners-up (1): 2016
  - Semi-finals (5): 1983, 1990, 1992, 1996, 2016
- UEFA Cup
  - 2nd round against Juventus 1993

== History ==
Despite limited financial resources, Kongsvinger played in the Norwegian top flight for 17 consecutive seasons between 1983 and 1999. Among the club's achievements were a silver medal in the league in 1992, bronze in both 1986 and 1987 and a 1–1 draw against football powerhouse Juventus in the 1993–94 UEFA Cup. Kongsvinger dropped out of the top flight in 1999, in the end struggling both financially and on the pitch. Only two years later another relegation sent the team down to 2. divisjon, the third tier in Norwegian football.

After a mediocre interlude in the 2002 season, former HamKam player Vegard Skogheim took over as head coach at Kongsvinger in 2003, instilling new enthusiasm into a young squad of part-timers. In 2003, the team went undefeated in their division and secured promotion back to the 1. divisjon, the second-highest level. The success continued in 2004, and the newly promoted team surprised many experts by managing third place in the league, and thereby earning the right to two play-off matches for promotion against the club that finished third last in the top division, Bodø/Glimt. Kongsvinger won the first match 1–0, but lost the second 0–4, giving away both the aggregate win and the right to play in the top division to Bodø/Glimt. Kongsvinger finished 1. divisjon as 3rd and qualified for promotion-relegation play-offs once again in the 2009 season. On 6 November, Kongsvinger defeated Sogndal 3–1 at home and faced with Sarpsborg 08. The club lost the first match 3–2 at away ground on 9 November, but won 3–1 at home (5–4 aggregate) on 12 November and returned to Tippeligaen after 10 years absence. The team finished their comeback season in the top flight in 15th place and was relegated to the 1. divisjon for the 2011 season. The club was relegated to the 2. divisjon in 2013. In the 2015 season, Kongsvinger won their group in the 2. divisjon and won promotion to the second tier.

== Season by season ==
Season		Pos.	Pl.	W	D	L	GS	GA	P	Cup	Notes
2001	1. divisjon	↓ 14	30	8	5	17	33	57	29	Second round	Relegated to 2. divisjon
2002	2. divisjon	7	26	11	4	11	36	31	37	Second round	
2003	2. divisjon	↑ 1	26	22	4	0	62	23	70	Second round	Promoted to 1. divisjon
2004	1. divisjon	3	30	16	5	9	53	42	53	Fourth round	Lost play-offs for promotion
2005	1. divisjon	10	30	11	4	15	41	48	37	Second round	
2006	1. divisjon	7	30	11	10	9	39	42	43	Third round	
2007	1. divisjon	4	30	16	5	9	56	42	53	Third round	
2008	1. divisjon	13	30	8	6	16	33	58	30	Third round	
2009	1. divisjon	↑ 3	30	18	2	10	52	37	56	Third round	Promoted to the Tippeligaen through play-offs
2010	Tippeligaen	↓ 15	30	4	8	18	27	58	20	Fourth round	Relegated to the 1. divisjon
2011	1. divisjon	7	30	14	7	9	50	36	49	Third round	
2012	1. divisjon	9	30	12	3	15	44	48	39	Third round	
2013	1. divisjon	↓ 14	30	7	10	13	37	54	31	Third round	Relegated to the 2. divisjon
2014	2. divisjon	4	26	15	3	8	61	42	48	Third round	
2015	2. divisjon	↑ 1	26	20	2	4	63	19	62	Third round	Promoted to 1. divisjon
2016	1. divisjon	5	30	14	7	9	56	42	49	Final	
2017	1. divisjon	10	30	10	6	14	47	46	36	Third round	
2018	1. divisjon	8	30	12	6	12	59	49	42	Third round	
2019	1. divisjon	5	30	14	4	12	37	36	46	Fourth round	
2020	1. divisjon	↓ 15	30	6	10	14	35	53	28	Cancelled	Relegated to the 2. divisjon
2021	2. divisjon	↑ 1	26	22	2	2	88	26	68	Fourth round	Promoted to the 1. divisjon
2022	1. divisjon	6	30	13	7	10	43	37	46	Second round	
2023	1. divisjon	3	30	16	4	10	53	39	52	Second round	
2024	1. divisjon	6	30	11	11	8	47	50	44	Second round	
2025	1. divisjon	3	30	16	9	6	61	42	54	Fourth round	
2026	1. divisjon	3	30	18	5	7	84	50	59	Third round	

== European record ==
Season	Competition	Round	Club	Home	Away	Agg.
1993–94	UEFA Cup	First round	(Sweden) Öster	4–1	3–1	7–2
1993–94	UEFA Cup	Second round	(Italy) Juventus	1–1	0–2	1–3
1998	UEFA Intertoto Cup	First round	(Wales) Ebbw Vale	3–0	6–1	9–1
1998	UEFA Intertoto Cup	Second round	(Netherlands) Twente	0–2	0–0	0–2

== Current squad ==
As of 7 September, 2026

Note: Flags indicate national team as defined under FIFA eligibility rules; some limited exceptions apply. Players may hold more than one non-FIFA nationality.

No.	Pos.	Nation	Player
1	GK	NOR	William Da Rocha
2	DF	ERI	Victor Fors
3	DF	NOR	Sondre Norheim
5	DF	NOR	Daniel Lysgård
6	MF	NOR	Adrian Hansen
8	MF	NOR	Andreas Dybevik (captain)
9	FW	SWE	Gabriel Johnson
12	DF	SEN	Mapenda Mbow
14	FW	NOR	Leon Hovland
15	FW	NOR	Vetle Lysell
16	DF	NOR	Herman Udnæs
17	MF	NOR	Mathias Gjerstrøm
18	FW	NOR	Markus Flores

No.	Pos.	Nation	Player
19	DF	DEN	Emil Nielsen
21	FW	GRE	Angelos Chaminta (on loan from Lillestrøm)
22	FW	NOR	Ludvig Langrekken
23	MF	DEN	Frederik Christensen
24	FW	NOR	Armand Øverby
25	DF	SOM	Saadiq Elmi
26	FW	NGR	Emmanuel Olawore
27	MF	NOR	Mads Sande
28	FW	NOR	Rasmus Christiansen
29	DF	NOR	Philip Fjellman
30	DF	NOR	Elias Tenden
93	GK	RUS	Aleksei Gorodovoy

For season transfers, see List of Norwegian football transfers winter 2025–26, and List of Norwegian football transfers summer 2026.

=== Out on loan ===
Note: Flags indicate national team as defined under FIFA eligibility rules; some limited exceptions apply. Players may hold more than one non-FIFA nationality.

No.	Pos.	Nation	Player
20	FW	NOR	Albert Sandstad (at FBK Karlstad until 31 December 2026)

== Managerial history ==
- Christer Nilsson (1983)
- Svein Ivar Sigernes (1984–1985)
- Ingvar Stadheim (1986)
- Even Pellerud (1987–89)
- Kent Karlsson (1990)
- Svein Ivar Sigernes (1991)
- Per Brogeland (1992–95)
- Åge Steen (1996–97)
- Per Anders Sjøvold (1998)
- Per Brogeland (1998–99)
- Hans Knutsen (2000)
- Erik Nystuen (2001)
- Kenneth Rosén (2002)
- Vegard Skogheim (2003–06)
- Thomas Berntsen (2006–08)
- Tom Nordlie (2008–09)
- Øyvind Eide (2009)
- Trond Amundsen (2009–10)
- Tony Gustavsson (2010)
- Per Brogeland (2011)
- Tom Nordlie (2011–2012)
- Stian Aasen (2013–2014)
- André Bergdølmo (2014)
- Luis Berkemeier Pimenta (2015–2016)
- Hans-Erik Eriksen (2017–2018)
- Mark Dempsey (2018)
- Vítor Gazimba (2019)
- Mika Lehkosuo (2019–2020)
- Espen Nystuen (interim) (2020)
- Eirik Mæland (2021–2022)
- Vegard Hansen (2022–2023)
- Johan Wennberg (2024–)

== Statistics ==
- Most matches played for the club: Øivind Tomteberget: 660
- Most league goals scored for the club: Cato Holtet: 46
- Biggest win: 6–0 vs Start (h 1985) Djerv 1919 (h 1989) and Fyllingen (h 1993)
- Biggest loss: 0–8 vs Tromsø (a 1995) and Strømsgodset (a 1997)
- Most spectators at a home match: 10213 (KIL-Juventus 1993, played at Ullevaal Stadion)
- Most spectators at a home match at Gjemselund Stadion: 6794 (KIL-Vålerenga 1983)
