= Svein Ivar Sigernes =

Norwegian footballer and coach (born 1949)

Svein Ivar Sigernes (born 4 February 1949) is a Norwegian former football player and coach.

As a player Sigernes played for Kongsvinger in the lower leagues in the 1970s, before he in 1982 led Kongsvinger to their first promotion to the top league of Norway, 1. Divisjon. Ahead of Kongsvinger first season in the top league, Sigernes was replaced by Christer Nilsson. Sigernes was, however, back the next season, and led the team in the top league until he was replaced by Ingvar Stadheim. Sigernes also coached Kongsvinger in the 1991 season.

Sigernes was head coach of Vålerenga from 1987 until he was fired in 1988, and has also worked as head coach for Norwegian national youth team, and led the under-20 team in the 1989 FIFA World Youth Championship.
