= Strømmen IF =

Norwegian sports club

- Full name: Strømmen Idrettsforening
- Founded: 25 September 1911; 115 years ago
- Ground: Strømmen Stadion
- Capacity: 2,000
- Chairman: Lars Habberstad
- Coach: Jens Wedeborg
- League: 1. divisjon
- 2026: 1. divisjon, 9th of 16
- Website: www.strommen-if.no
| Home colours | Away colours |

Strømmen Idrettsforening is a Norwegian sports club from Strømmen. It has sections for football, athletics and gymnastics, and formerly had sections for bandy, orienteering, skiing, speed skating, swimming among other sports.

== History ==
The club was founded on 25 September 1911 as Strømmen FK. The name was changed to FK Norrøna in 1914. In 1923 the club merged with Strømmen IL and took the name IL Norrøna. In 1935 it incorporated the club Strømmen BK, founded in the 1920s, and reverted its name back to Strømmen FK. On 27 June 1945, the club merged with AIF club Strømmen AIL, founded 1928, and got its current name.

== Football ==
The club reached the Norwegian Football Cup semi-final in 1957, and played in the Norwegian top flight from 1949 to 1955 and from 1956 to 1961, as well as in 1986 and 1988. The club hosts the record for lowest attendance in the highest league, 202. They play their matches at Strømmen Stadion.

In 2006, Strømmen won their 3. divisjon group. In the qualification match for the 2. divisjon they met Ullern. Strømmen won the first leg, 6–2, on home ground, and they lost the second leg, 4–2, but won 8–6 on aggregate, and achieved their promotion for the 2007 season. Strømmen got relegated in 2007, but retained their spot since Odd Grenland 2 got demoted to the 3. divisjon, following Odd's first team being relegated from the top tier, Tippeligaen. Thomas Berntsen was hired by Strømmen on 3 August 2008, and with Berntsen as head coach, Strømmen avoided relegation to the 3. divisjon. Ahead of the 2009 season, Petter Myhre was named co-coach together with Berntsen. With Berntsen and Myhre as coaches, Strømmen won their 2009 2. divisjon group and was promoted to 1. divisjon. In 2010 Strømmen finished three points behind a promotion play-offs spot. In the decisive match of the 2011 season, Strømmen avoided relegation with a 6–1 win against Nybergsund. After the 2011 season, Berntsen was replaced by Erland Johnsen.

=== Recent history ===
| Season | Div. | Pos. | Pl. | W | D | L | GS | GA | Pts | Cup | Notes |
|---|---|---|---|---|---|---|---|---|---|---|---|
| 2001 | D3/4 | 3 | 22 | 10 | 5 | 7 | 46 | 37 | 35 | 1st qualifying round | |
| 2002 | D3/5 | 3 | 22 | 14 | 4 | 4 | 75 | 38 | 46 | 1st qualifying round | |
| 2003 | D3/5 | 2 | 22 | 17 | 1 | 4 | 65 | 23 | 52 | 1st qualifying round | |
| 2004 | D3/3 | 1 | 22 | 19 | 2 | 1 | 76 | 21 | 59 | 1st round | Lost playoffs for promotion |
| 2005 | D3/4 | 2 | 20 | 12 | 2 | 6 | 56 | 38 | 38 | 2nd round | |
| 2006 | D3/4 | ↑ 1 | 22 | 19 | 1 | 2 | 84 | 32 | 58 | 1st qualifying round | Promoted to 2. divisjon |
| 2007 | D2/1 | 12 | 26 | 8 | 4 | 14 | 50 | 52 | 28 | 1st round | Avoided relegation due to the relegation of the reserve teams of Odd Grenland and Start |
| 2008 | D2/1 | 11 | 26 | 8 | 5 | 13 | 31 | 49 | 29 | 1st round | |
| 2009 | D2/1 | ↑ 1 | 26 | 20 | 3 | 3 | 77 | 31 | 63 | 2nd round | Promoted to 1. divisjon |
| 2010 | 1D | 7 | 28 | 12 | 4 | 12 | 43 | 42 | 40 | 3rd round | |
| 2011 | 1D | 12 | 30 | 9 | 7 | 14 | 43 | 58 | 34 | 2nd round | |
| 2012 | 1D | 11 | 30 | 10 | 7 | 13 | 39 | 51 | 37 | 2nd round | |
| 2013 | 1D | 11 | 30 | 9 | 11 | 10 | 39 | 43 | 38 | 2nd round | |
| 2014 | 1D | 10 | 30 | 11 | 8 | 11 | 59 | 54 | 41 | 3rd round | |
| 2015 | 1D | 8 | 30 | 10 | 7 | 13 | 33 | 39 | 37 | 4th round | |
| 2016 | 1D | 7 | 30 | 13 | 8 | 9 | 46 | 45 | 47 | 3rd round | |
| 2017 | 1D | 11 | 30 | 9 | 9 | 12 | 39 | 47 | 36 | 2nd round | |
| 2018 | 1D | 11 | 30 | 12 | 2 | 16 | 49 | 53 | 38 | 2nd round | |
| 2019 | 1D | 13 | 30 | 7 | 10 | 13 | 32 | 46 | 30 | 4th round | |
| 2020 | 1D | 10 | 30 | 10 | 8 | 12 | 47 | 51 | 35 | Cancelled | |
| 2021 | 1D | ↓ 16 | 30 | 4 | 12 | 14 | 32 | 49 | 24 | 2nd round | Relegated to 2. divisjon |
| 2022 | 2D | 6 | 24 | 9 | 4 | 11 | 36 | 39 | 31 | 1st round | |
| 2023 | 2D | 4 | 26 | 14 | 3 | 9 | 39 | 35 | 45 | 2nd round | |
| 2024 | 2D | 3 | 26 | 14 | 4 | 8 | 49 | 38 | 46 | 2nd round | |
| 2025 | 2D | ↑ 1 | 26 | 20 | 2 | 4 | 69 | 24 | 62 | 3rd round | Promoted to 1. divisjon |
| 2026 | 1D | 9 | 30 | 11 | 6 | 13 | 52 | 62 | 39 | 2nd round | |

== Current squad ==
As of 4 September 2026

Note: Flags indicate national team as defined under FIFA eligibility rules; some limited exceptions apply. Players may hold more than one non-FIFA nationality.

| No. | Pos. | Nation | Player |
|---|---|---|---|
| 1 | GK | NOR | Mads Kristiansen |
| 2 | DF | NOR | Sindre Rindal |
| 3 | DF | AUS | Cameron Crestani |
| 4 | DF | NOR | Maximilian Balatoni |
| 5 | DF | DEN | Simon Sharif |
| 6 | MF | NOR | Simen Beck |
| 7 | MF | NOR | Henrik Kristiansen |
| 8 | MF | NOR | Kodjo Somesi |
| 11 | FW | NOR | Markus Wæhler (on loan from Lillestrøm) |
| 12 | GK | NOR | Knut-André Skjærstein |
| 13 | DF | NOR | Adrian Solberg |
| 14 | FW | NOR | Julian Kristengård |

| No. | Pos. | Nation | Player |
|---|---|---|---|
| 15 | DF | NOR | Herman Paulsrud |
| 16 | FW | NOR | Anders Nord |
| 17 | DF | NOR | Leon Sethi |
| 19 | DF | NOR | Even Rogne |
| 21 | DF | NGR | Tochukwu Joseph Ogboji (on loan from Lillestrøm) |
| 24 | DF | NOR | Marcus Paulsen |
| 25 | DF | SWE | Pontus Lindgren |
| 27 | FW | NGR | Terry Benjamin (on loan from Start) |
| 28 | DF | NOR | Nikolai Eide Ohr |
| 30 | GK | NOR | Marius Kollstrom |
| 98 | DF | NOR | Thomas Lillo |

=== Out on loan ===
Note: Flags indicate national team as defined under FIFA eligibility rules; some limited exceptions apply. Players may hold more than one non-FIFA nationality.

| No. | Pos. | Nation | Player |
|---|---|---|---|
| 23 | DF | NOR | Sverre Nilsen (at Skedsmo FK until 31 December 2026) |

== Athletics ==
Former cross-country skier Thomas Alsgaard competed for Strømmen IF in steeplechase and long-distance running in his younger days.

The club's only Norwegian champion in athletics is Otto Rui. He won the hammer throw in 1987, and also took national medals in 1985, 1988 and 1989. Sidsel Kjellås is their winningest domestic medalist, with silver medals in the 80 metres hurdles in 1964, pentathlon in 1965, and the tetrathlon in 1966 and a bronze in the standing long jump in 1965. Birgit Tofthagen took a national silver medal in the high jump in 1964, and Unni Lundby took a bronze medal in the 200 metres in 1969. Strømmen's women' team in the 4 x 100 metres relay also took a national silver medal in 1965 and a bronze in 1970.

The club hosted the 1992 Norwegian Cross-Country Championships.
