= Espen Edvardsen =

Norwegian footballer (born 1979)

Personal information
- Date of birth: 25 February 1979 (age 47)
- Place of birth: Trondheim, Norway
- Height: 1.80 m (5 ft 11 in)
- Position: Midfielder

Youth career
- –1995: Flatås
- 1996–1998: Rosenborg

Senior career*
Years	Team	Apps	(Gls)
1999–2001	Rosenborg	2	(0)
1999–2000	→ Byåsen (loan)		
2001	→ Strømsgodset (loan)		
2002–2005	→ Byåsen		
2006–2007	St. Hanshaugen		

International career
1998	Norway U18	3	(0)
2000	Norway U21	4	(0)
- * Club domestic league appearances and goals

Espen Edvardsen (born 25 February 1979) is a retired Norwegian football midfielder.

Joining Rosenborg BK's junior team in 1996, he was drafted into the first team ahead of the 1999 season. He was loaned out to Byåsen in 1999 and 2000 and Strømsgodset in 2001, and featured in Rosenborg league and cup matches in the summer of 1999. He was also capped as a Norway youth and U21 international. He was let go from Rosenborg after the 2001 season. Joining Byåsen on a permanent basis, he moved to Oslo in 2006 to play for St. Hanshaugens IF before that team folded in late 2007.
