= Harald Aabrekk =

Norwegian footballer and manager (born 1956)

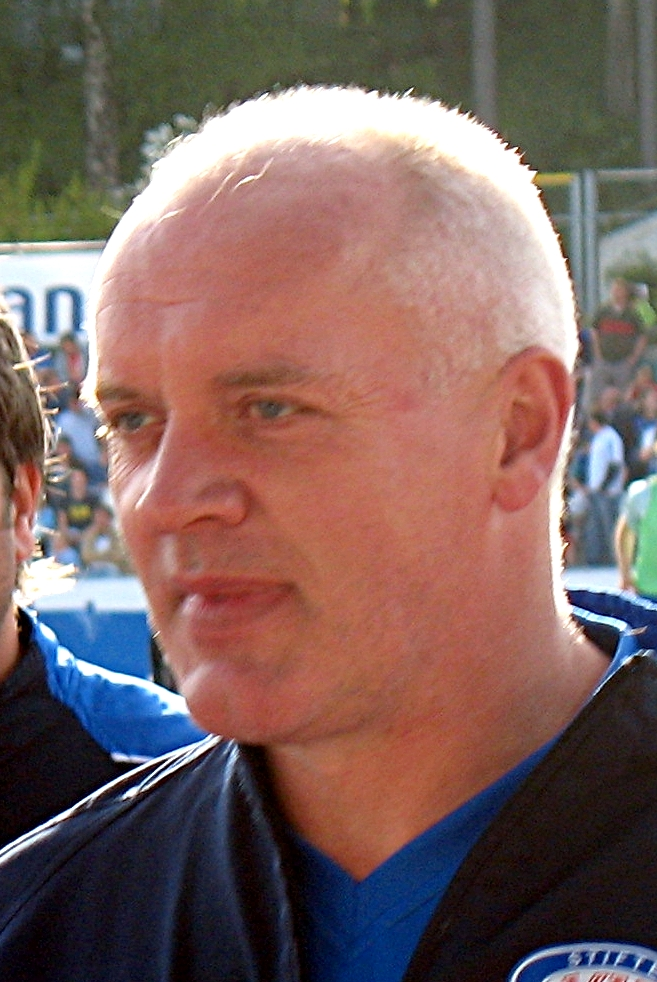
- Aabrekk in 2006

Personal information
- Full name: Harald Olav Aabrekk
- Date of birth: 22 February 1956 (age 70)
- Place of birth: Nordfjordeid, Norway
- Position: Midfielder

Youth career
- –1973: Eid

Senior career*
Years	Team	Apps	(Gls)
1974–1982	Sogndal	133	(35)
1978	Brann	1	(0)

Managerial career
- 1983–1984: Eid
- 1985–1986: Sandane
- 1987–1989: Stryn
- 1990–1992: Sogndal
- 1993–1995: Tromsø
- 1998–1999: Brann
- 2002–2005: Haugesund
- 2007: Vålerenga
- 2010–2011: Sogndal
- 2015: Aalesund
- * Club domestic league appearances and goals

Harald Olav Aabrekk (born 22 February 1956) is a Norwegian football coach and a former player. He played for Sogndal and Brann in the Tippeligaen, Norway's top professional football league. He has been head coach of Sogndal, Tromsø, Brann, Haugesund, Vålerenga and Aalesund, and has also served as an assistant coach for the Norway national football team.

== Playing career ==
Aabrekk made his debut for Sogndal in 1974 in the Norwegian Second Division (the third tier of Norwegian football). Except for a short spell at SK Brann, where he played a match in the Tippeligaen (the top division) in 1978, he played for Sogndal throughout his career and was a major contributor to their promotion to the Norwegian First Division in 1981. He scored Sogndal's first goal in that division, against Molde in 1982. He played a total of 133 league games from 1973 to 1982, including 22 matches in the First Division in 1982.

== Coaching career ==
Aabrekk started his coaching career in his home county, Sogn og Fjordane, at lower-league clubs Eid, Sandane, and Stryn, before becoming head coach of Sogndal. In 1990, his first season with them, Sogndal was promoted to the Tippeligaen in spite of a 5–0 loss against Bryne in their first home match. He then served as head coach of Tromsø in the Tippeligaen from 1993 to 1995.

In 1995, during a match against Bodø/Glimt, Aabrekk tried to stall for time by acting as if he were injured after he was run down by Bodø/Glimt's physiotherapist Truls Karlsen. Although uninjured, he was taken by ambulance to the hospital. In an interview with Verdens Gang, he excused his behavior by saying, "I felt I was lying on the ground a bit too long, and I did not dare to get up so I stayed on the ground. I lay there and was thinking, 'What's going on?' It was not planned, and it was definitely not very smart. I would rather call it a blackout." This episode, according to the Norwegian newspaper Dagbladet, was the third worst case of acting in the history of football.

Aabrekk later worked for the Football Association of Norway as a coordinator for youth development in Western Norway. He also served as Nils Johan Semb's assistant coach for the Norwegian under-21 team from 1992 to 1998, and when Semb succeeded Egil Olsen as head coach of the Norway national football team in 1998, Aabrekk became assistant coach of the national senior team. At the same time, he worked as Kjell Tennfjord's assistant in Brann, and in the summer of 1998 he became their head coach. After leading Brann to the finals of the 1999 Norwegian Cup, where they lost 2–0 against Rosenborg, he received a one-year leave of absence to work full-time as assistant coach of the national team during their preparations for the UEFA Euro 2000 football championship. He resigned from his job at Brann without returning, because Brann had already hired Teitur Thordarson as their head coach and offered Aabrekk a position in their youth department, a job Brann claimed it was impossible to combine with the position of assistant coach of the national team.

In 2002 Aabrekk joined Sogndal as Torbjørn Glomnes's assistant coach and saved the team from relegation. On 17 September 2002 Haugesund announced that Aabrekk would join them as head coach on 1 December. In a match against Start on 19 October 2003, Aabrekk told referee Bjørn Hansen that he was "bought and paid for" twice after Aabrekk was dismissed from the bench. He was at Haugesund until the end of the 2005 season, when he joined Vålerenga's coaching staff along with Egil Olsen and Petter Myhre. On 27 July 2007 Myhre resigned as head coach of Vålerenga and Aabrekk was appointed head coach as caretaker. Following two wins and a draw in the next three matches, Vålerenga gave him the job until the end of the season.

In 2008 Aabrekk was hired by Brann as a scout. Halfway through the season, the club wanted Aabrekk and the assistant coach, Espen Steffensen, to switch jobs. Steffensen did not accept this and was fired, and Aabrekk became the new assistant coach of Brann, against the wishes of head coach Mons Ivar Mjelde. Following Brann's bad performances and local press criticism of the lack of cooperation between Mjelde and Aabrekk, Mjelde announced on 7 October 2008 that he would resign as head coach at the end of the season. At the same time, the club announced that Aabrekk would return immediately to his job as scout, a position he kept until the contract expired.

Aabrekk was then hired as head coach of his old club, Sogndal from 1 January 2010, succeeding Karl Oskar Emberland. In his first season there, the team won promotion to the Tippeligaen, and in the next they avoided relegation. Following the 2011 season, Aabrekk retired. In his last match, he was named "Best Sogndal coach ever".

Aabrekk was hired as manager for Aalesunds FK before the 2015 season, but sacked four matches into the season when his club was last in the league.

Norway national football team assistant coach
Preceded by: Nils Johan Semb	Season: 1998–2003	Succeeded by: Stig Inge Bjørnebye
