= Per Brogeland =

Norwegian football manager (born 1953)

Personal information
- Date of birth: 27 January 1953 (age 73)
- Place of birth: Norway
- Position: Midfielder

Managerial career
- Years: Team
- Eidsvold Turn
- 1992–1995: Kongsvinger
- 1996–1997: Lillestrøm
- 1997–1998: LASK Linz
- 1998–1999: Kongsvinger
- 2001: Hønefoss BK
- 2005–2008: Lyn
- 2009–2010: Eidsvold Turn
- 2010–2011: Kongsvinger

Per Brogeland (born 27 January 1953) is a Norwegian football manager. He has been the head coach of Lillestrøm, among others.

He is among an exclusive group of Norwegians who have managed a top-flight team abroad, in Brogeland's case the Austrian LASK Linz. Controversially, however, he was sacked at a moment when the club was third in the league and had qualified for the quarter-finals of the cup.

Under Brogeland's command, the small club Kongsvinger IL were runners-up in the Norwegian Premier League in 1992. In the 1993 UEFA Cup, after having beaten Swedish Östers IF 7–2 on aggregate, Brogeland led Kongsvinger to a surprise draw against Juventus at home.
