= Petter Myhre =

Norwegian footballer and coach (born 1972)

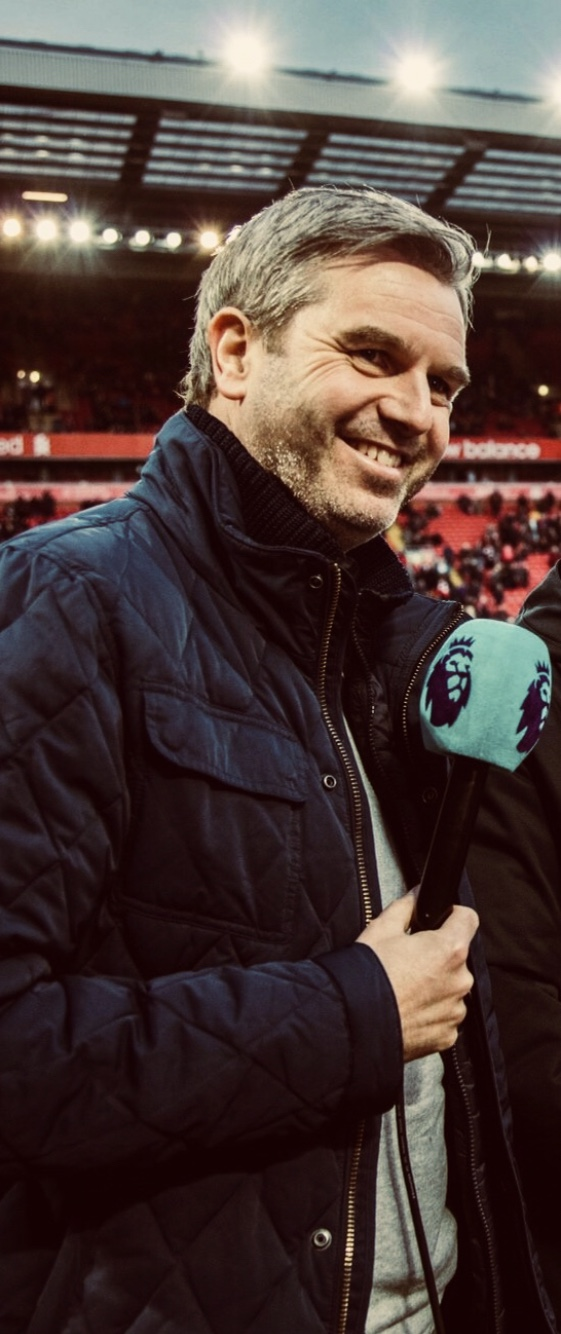

Personal information
- Date of birth: 21 February 1972 (age 54)
- Position: Midfielder

Senior career*
Years	Team	Apps	(Gls)
1990–1995	Strømmen		
1996	Ullern		
1997–2001	Skjetten		

Managerial career
- 2002–2005: Vålerenga (junior and reserves)
- 2006: Vålerenga (assistant)
- 2006–2007: Vålerenga
- 2009–2010: Strømmen
- 2020–2023: Lillestrøm (assistant)
- 2024–2026: Vålerenga (assistant)
- 2026: Vålerenga (interim)
- * Club domestic league appearances and goals

Petter Myhre (born 21 February 1972) is a retired Norwegian footballer.

During his active career he played for Strømmen IF, Ullern IF and Skjetten SK. He also pursued education at the Norwegian School of Sport Sciences.

From 2002 he coached the junior team and reserves team of Vålerenga, and also played sporadic matches. He was promoted to assistant coach of the first team in 2006, and mid-season he was promoted to head coach. He lasted until July 2007. Ahead of the 2009 season he was named as co-coach of Strømmen IF together with Thomas Berntsen.

On 24 January 2020 Myhre became assistant coach for Lillestrøm. Following the main coach Geir Bakke's controversial transfer to rival club Vålerenga, Myhre was released from his contract in Lillestrøm. In January 2024, he joined his former colleague in Vålerenga, becoming the assistant coach for Vålerenga ahead of the 2024 season.

He also commentates football on the Norwegian TV channel TV 2.
