= Vålerenga Fotball =

Norwegian football club

Vålerenga
- Full name: Vålerenga Fotball
- Nicknames: Enga; Bohemene (The Bohemians); De kongeblå (The Royal Blues); St. Hallvards menn (St. Hallvard’s Men)
- Short name: VIF
- Founded: 29 July 1913; 113 years ago
- Ground: Intility Arena; Valle Hovin, Oslo
- Capacity: 16,555
- Chairman: Thor Gjermund Eriksen
- Head coach: Johannes Moesgaard
- League: Eliteserien
- 2025: Eliteserien, 6th of 16
- Website: www.vif-fotball.no
Home colours	Away colours

Vålerenga Fotball (Norwegian pronunciation: [ˈvôːɽɛŋɑ]) is a Norwegian professional football club from Oslo and a part of the multi-sport club Vålerengens IF. The club currently competes in the Eliteserien after being promoted from the Norwegian First Division in 2024. Founded in 1913, the club is named after the neighborhood of Vålerenga. Vålerenga's home ground is Intility Arena, located in Valle-Hovin. Vålerenga are five-time league champions and four-time Norwegian Football Cup champions, having last won the league in 2005 and the cup in 2008. Vålerenga is generally considered to be the largest football club in Oslo, and they are known for their loyal supporters.

== History ==
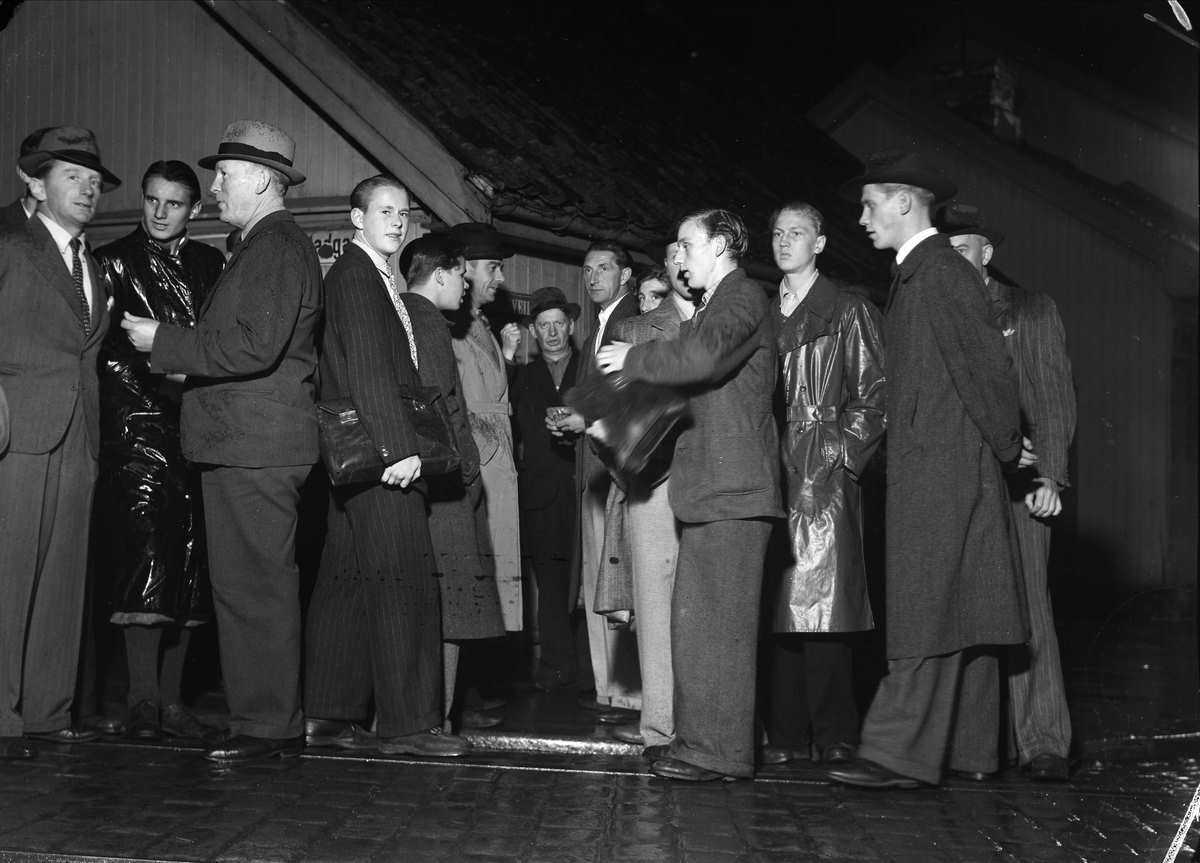
VIF players at Sotahjørnet in 1946

=== Early days (1913–45) ===
The history of Vålerenga Fotball goes back to Fotballpartiet Spark, which was founded in 1898 by pastor Hans Møller Gasmann. An early mission for Gasmann was to give the local youth social activity and exercise. On a larger scale, the club was part of the movement known as Muscular Christianity. A successor to this football club, Idrettslaget Spring, was founded on 29 July 1913 by a group of teenage factory workers. A year later, the club changed its name to Vaalerengens Idrættsforening. Rooted in the neighborhood of Vålerenga on the east end of Oslo, the club would recruit players and supporters from the many workers in the area, in a society then characterized by its low mobility between social strata. Within its first seasons, Vålerengen would compete with the major clubs in Oslo at that time: Lyn, Mercantile and Frigg. Where Lyn and Frigg had a strong identity with the academia and the upper classes, Vålerengen developed a working class identity.

Vålerengens Idrettsforening had mixed success in its first years, but fortunes improved as the 1920s came around and the club secured promotion to the Oslo Championships in 1921. Vålerengen won the Oslo Championships four times before a national league (Norgesserien) was established in 1937. In the 1948–49 season, Vålerengen finished second.

After this period, Vålerengen entered a period of instability, being relegated from the top division two times in the 1950s.

=== The Bohemians (1946–68) ===
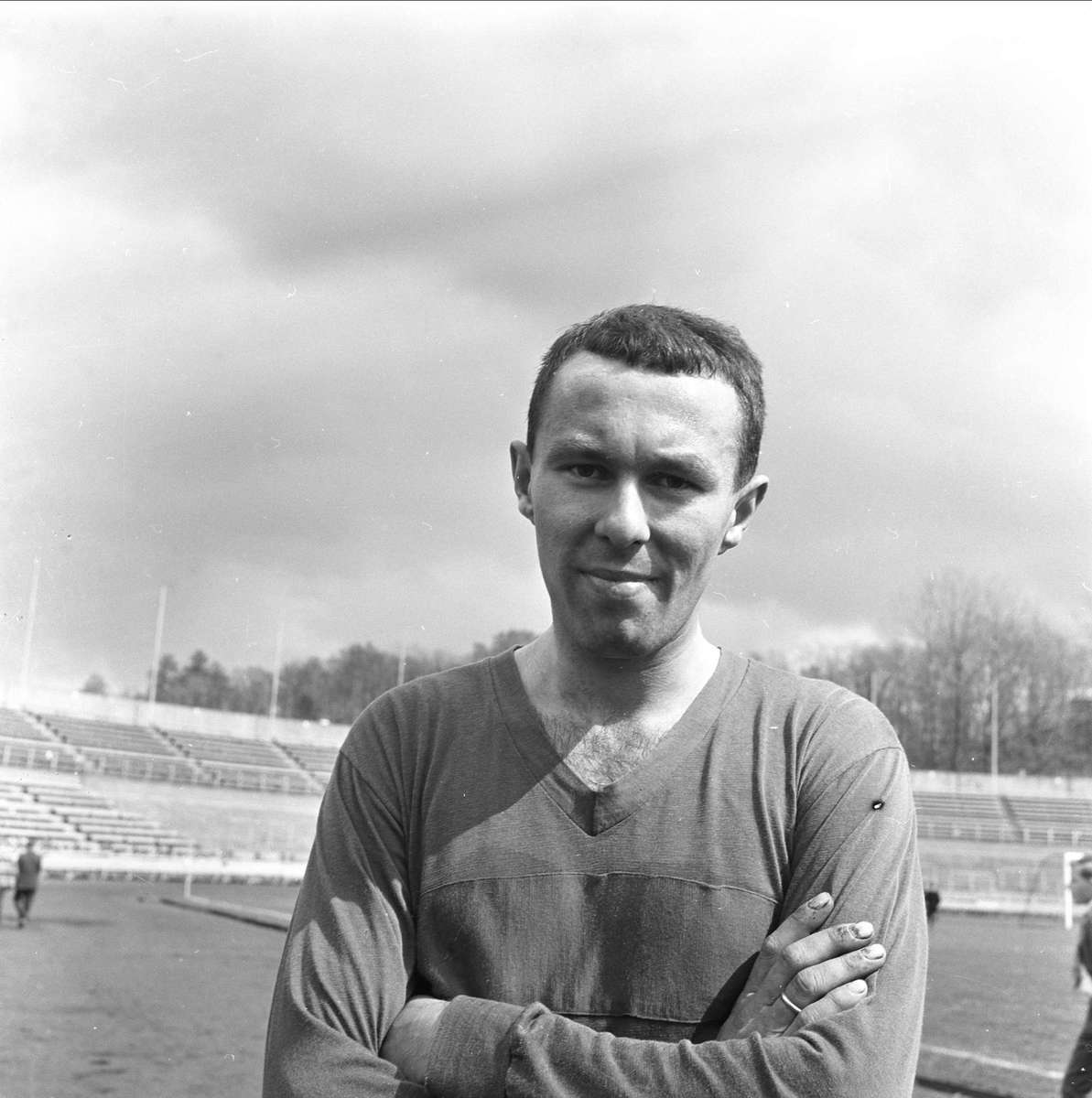
Leif Eriksen was part of the group of players known as Bohemene.

The charismatic Helmuth Steffens became a central figure in building up the culture in the club after the war. At the beginning of the 1960s, a new generation of local players broke into Vålerengen's first squad. Players like Einar Bruno Larsen, Terje Hellerud and Leif Eriksen became core personalities of a group of players that eventually became known as Bohemene (The Bohemians). The club would become known for its brilliant style of football as the number of people in the audience increased. The players became popular for their charismatic, witty comments and light hearted humour. Vålerengen secured a third place in 1961.

In 1965, Vålerengen won the First Division for the first time. By the help of manager Helmuth Steffens and head coach Anton Ploderer, the club had managed to win the title with a team of local players. The league was won in dramatic fashion, with arch-rivals Lyn giving Vålerengen a fight for the title until the final matches of the season.

The Bohemian era came to an end when the club was relegated from the First Division in 1968 and then again to the Third Division in 1970. Vålerengen did not achieve promotion to the top league again until 1974. In 1976, Vålerenga signed Odd Iversen, who at the time had 112 First Division goals to his name. Iversen would help the club reestablish itself in the First Division.

=== The glory years (1977–86) ===
The 80s saw the emergence of a new generation. With the help of players like Tom Jacobsen and Vidar Davidsen, Vålerengen would win its first cup title in 1980.

Led by head coach Leif Eriksen, the team won the First Division title for the second time in 1981 with a style of play characterized by intensity and discipline. The club was unable to reclaim the league title in 1982, but won it again in 1983 and 1984. During the decade, Vålerengen would also become twice runners-up in the cup and also achieve a third place in the league in 1985. Vålerengen had become a stable top team for the first and, to date, only time.

1985 also saw the signing of striker Jørn Andersen, who would go on to score 23 goals in 22 matches in his sole season for Vålerengen. However, as the club had miscalculated the home crowd average, the club entered severe financial difficulties. Vålerenga was saved from bankruptcy in 1987.

=== Ups and downs (1987–2003) ===
In 1990, now known as Vålerenga, the club was relegated after 14 seasons in the top division. Vålerenga was close to further relegation in the 1992 season, but managed to remain in the second highest division thanks to a last round 3–0 win against Eik-Tønsberg IF. In 1994, Vålerenga returned to the top division, but were relegated again in 1996. In 1997 Vålerenga won the cup and the 1. divisjon and were again promoted to Tippeligaen. As earlier in the 1990s, the stay in the top division lasted only a few years.

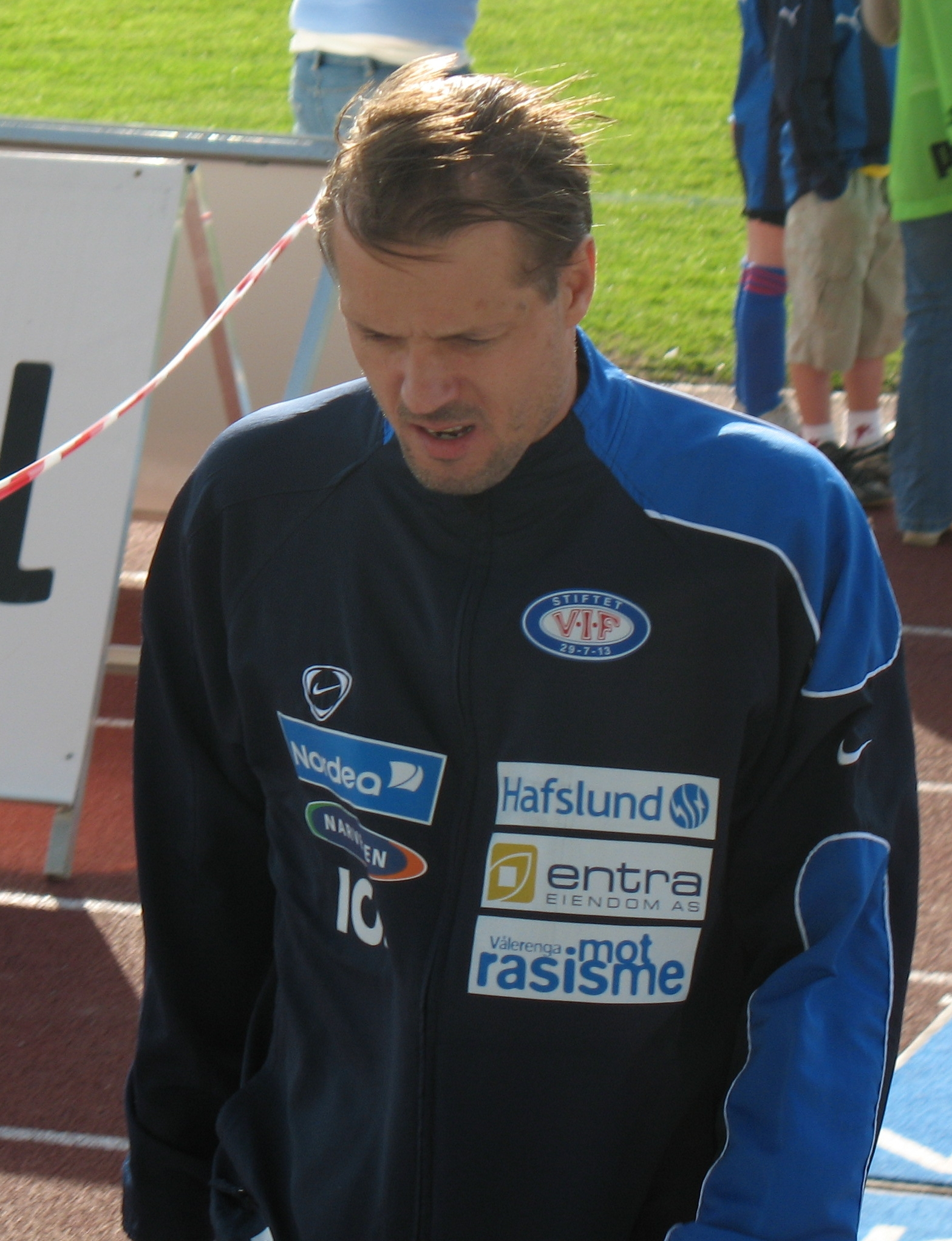
Kjetil Rekdal joined Vålerenga in 2000 and became player-manager in 2001.

In the 2000 season Vålerenga lost the play-off matches against Sogndal and was relegated to the 1. divisjon. Vålerenga returned to Tippeligaen and won the cup in 2002.

The 2003 season was poor for Vålerenga and they wound up third last in the league sending them into play-offs against Sandefjord to avoid relegation. The result was a 0–0 draw in Sandefjord and a 5–3 victory in Oslo and so Vålerenga retained the position in the top league and avoided relegation.

=== Success, disappointments and troubles (2004–12) ===
Vålerenga rebounded nicely in the 2004 season and proved a serious challenge to the dominant Rosenborg team in the bid for the league's gold medal. After a frantic final round where Vålerenga beat Stabæk 3–0, they missed out on the league title since Rosenborg beat FK Lyn, Vålerenga's city rivals 4–1. Vålerenga won the silver medal, finishing 2nd to Rosenborg equal on points and goal difference, but Vålerenga had scored fewer goals than Rosenborg during the season, leaving Rosenborg as league champions.

At the start of the 2005 season it was apparent that Rosenborg was in bad shape and it seemed like Vålerenga's season to go all the way. After a strong season opening, the surprise of the season IK Start – newly promoted to the Tippeligaen – looked to give Vålerenga a fight to the finish, and the two clubs basically alternated on leading the series to the final round. On 29 October it looked to be a thrilling last round reminiscent of the previous year, as both Start and Vålerenga had exactly the same number of points, but Start with a slightly better goal difference. Start met Fredrikstad FK at home, while Vålerenga met Odd Grenland away. Eventually Fredrikstad, who faced relegation if they lost, beat Start 3–1 while at the same time Vålerenga managed a 2–2 draw against Odd Grenland. Vålerenga stepped one up from the previous year, and won the title with a one-point margin. The title was Vålerenga's first league title in 21 years, ending Rosenborg's 13-year reign as league champions.

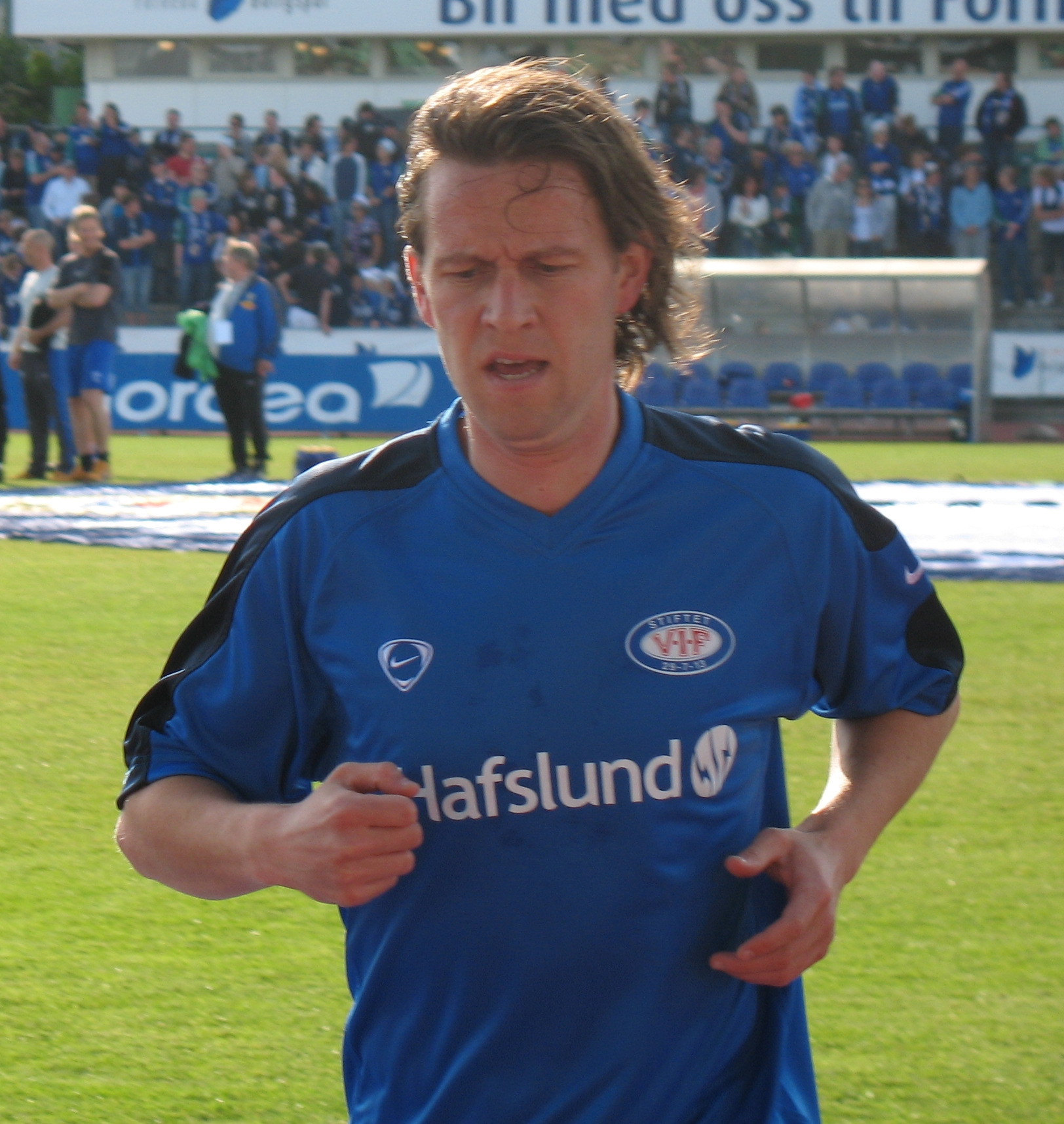
Morten Berre holds the record for most matches in the highest division for Vålerenga.

The follow-up season of 2006 did not start out as well for the reigning champions, and a poor start left them at the bottom of the table after seven rounds, having gained only 5 points. A steady rise in form though still brought the team to 6th place by the time the season was half-through. Late July brought a string of bad results, including embarrassing losses to main rival FK Lyn, and the exit from the UEFA Champions League, after losing 5–3 on aggregate to Czech club Mladá Boleslav in the 2nd qualifying round. Vålerenga had aimed to qualify for the tournament after missing out the previous year by being defeated by Belgian side Club Brugge on a penalty shoot-out. After losing five out of seven games between 22 July and 19 August head-coach Kjetil Rekdal announced his resignation. Assistant coach Petter Myhre took over as interim manager, and as a result the club regained their form and scored 25 out of the last 30 possible points, bringing the club to a third place in the league, as well as a qualification spot for the 2007–08 Europa League. Vålerenga also qualified for play in the 2006–07 Scandinavian Royal League after finishing among the top four teams in Norway. In October 2006, Petter Myhre was hired on a permanent basis, but he would resign in July 2007, following a string of bad results.

In November 2007, Martin Andresen signed a three-year contract to become the next manager of Vålerenga. Heavy investment from owners and investors saw the signing of several high-profile players, most notably Lars Iver Strand and Kristoffer Hæstad. However, despite winning the 2008 Norwegian Football Cup, the following season was a disappointment, with Vålerenga finishing 10th in the league. In the 2009 season, Vålerenga finished 7th, reaching the semifinal in the cup. 2010 saw a revitalized Vålerenga, led by a trio of effective forwards, Mohammed Abdellaoue, Bengt Sæternes and Luton Shelton. Vålerenga finished second in the league.

However, Vålerenga could not repeat the success in 2011 and 2012. In October 2012, Andresen and Vålerenga agreed to part ways.

=== A new era (2013–present) ===
Kjetil Rekdal returned to the club as head coach in January 2013. Facing financial difficulties from previous seasons and being without a shirt sponsorship deal, Vålerenga spent much of the 2014 season dealing with a severe risk of bankruptcy, before signing a new shirt sponsorship deal with DnB on 29 July. The signing of striker Vidar Örn Kjartansson in front of 2014 season proved to be a huge success, with the Icelandic player scoring 25 goals in 29 games, helping the Oslo club secure a sixth place in the league after a drop in form in the latter half of the season.

On 13 July 2016, Ronny Deila was appointed as the new head coach. Deila was originally planned to take over in January 2017, but was involved in the coaching team for the final games of the 2016 season. Kjetil Rekdal was to become director of sports, but left the club in early 2017. In December 2019, Ronny Deila left to become the coach of New York City Football Club. In January 2020, Dag-Eilev Fagermo became the new head coach.

Vålerenga moved into their newly built stadium, Intility Arena, in September 2017. This was a historic move for the club, after spending 104 years without owning a home stadium. The new stadium is also close to Vålerenga neighborhood of Oslo.

== Colours ==
Up to 1913, Vålerenga's kit was moss green. In 1914, the Norwegian State Railways had a set of blue and red kits left over, which Vålerenga bought cheaply, so their official colours became blue and red. The 2006 season away kit was white with a touch of moss green.

== Stadium ==
In 2017, Vålerenga opened their own home ground at Valle Hovin in Eastern Oslo, called Intility Arena. The stadium has a capacity of 17,333 on domestic games (15,389 on international games), and the playing surface is artificial grass. The very first match in the ground saw the Vålerenga women's team beat Kolbotn Fotball 2–0 on 9 September 2017, with Stephanie Verdoia being the first ever goalscorer on the Arena. The next day, the men's team lost 2–1 to Sarpsborg 08 in their first game at the stadium. The ground was first called Vålerenga kultur- og idrettspark, before the club agreed a contract with the IT company Intility to rename the stadium.

=== The construction of the new arena ===
Following a press statement made on 15 May 2008, Vålerenga announced that they would be moving home to Valle Hovin after purchasing the area of the proposed stadium for the symbolic sum of 1 Norwegian Krone. In late 2014, the plans were accepted by the city council of Oslo. On 10 June 2014, the European Free Trade Association Surveillance Authority accepted the plans for the stadium.

The foundation stone of the new stadium was laid on 29 July 2015, the club's 102nd anniversary. Construction begun in the summer of 2015 and was completed in 2017.

=== Stadium history ===
Before moving into Intility Arena, the Ullevaal Stadion was the home ground, a stadium owned jointly by the Football Association of Norway and Vital Eiendom.

From the 1960s till the 1980s and a short period in the end of the 1990s Bislett Stadium was Vålerenga's home ground. Bislett Stadium also hosted speed skating and track and field events in addition to football, and hosted the 1952 Winter Olympics. Poor conditions and maintenance of Bislett forced Vålerenga to move to Ullevaal and a groundshare with FK Lyn.

After Vålerenga moved from Bislett Stadium plans for building their own ground were conceived, but poor results on the field combined with financial problems kept those plans at bay for a few years. After the second place in 2004 and the league title in 2005 as well as business man John Fredriksen's deletion of the club's debt in 2003, the talks of building a ground for Vålerenga resurfaced.

== Supporters ==
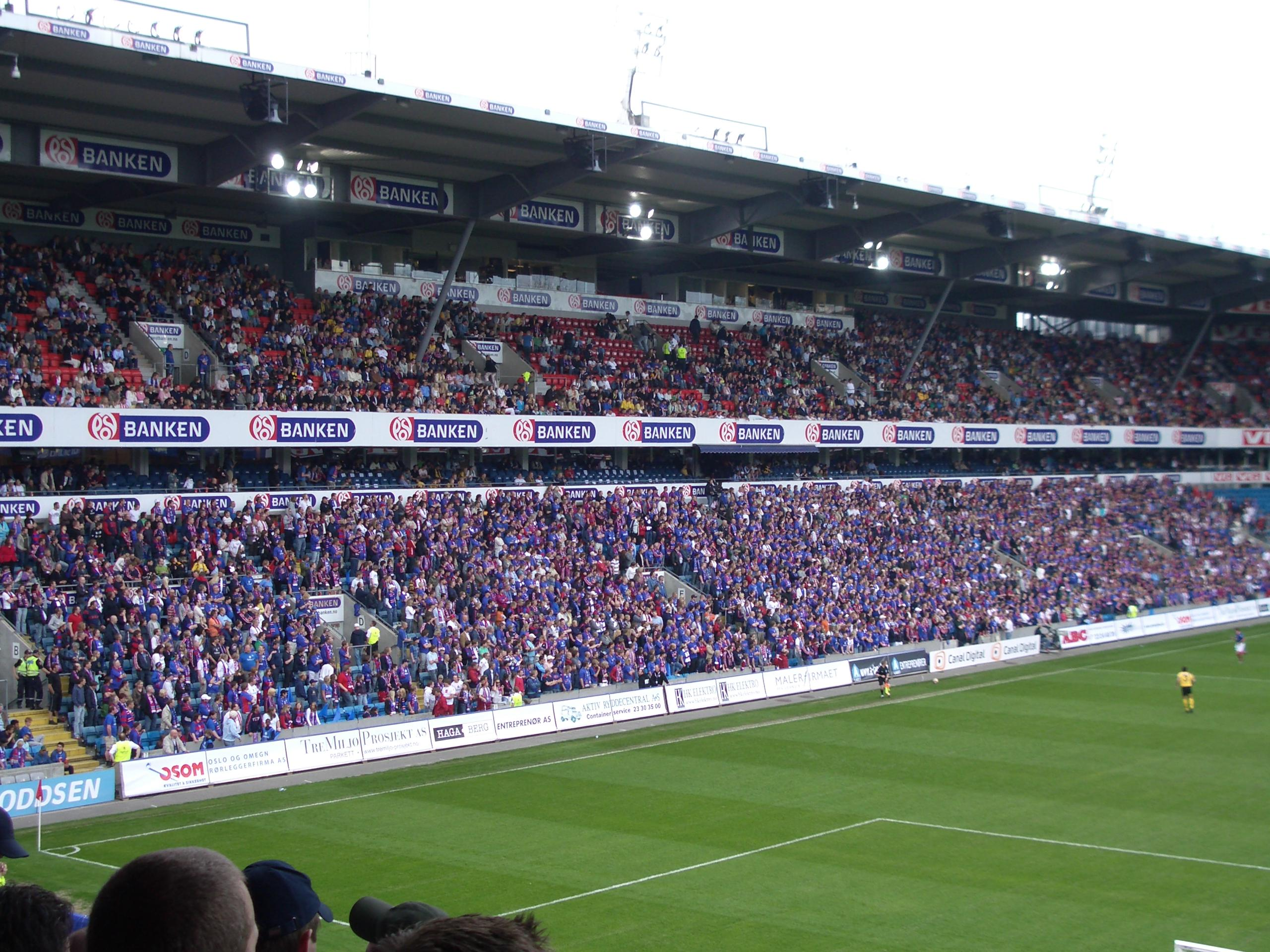
Vålerenga supporters in the stand nicknamed "The West Bank in 2006"

Vålerenga has traditionally drawn support from the area around Vålerenga, Oslo and various other places on the east end of Oslo, although today these lines are largely blurred and the club has supporters all over Oslo and the surrounding areas. Up until the early 90s, Vålerenga's supporters were loosely organised. The supporters were sometimes referred to as Apeberget, but this is actually a misnomer from a journalist. An independent supporter club called Klanen ("The Clan") was founded in 1991. The senior team of Vålerenga has reserved shirt number 12 for their supporters.

AFter the club moved to Intility Arena in 2017, the loudest fans are gathered at the east stand, nicknamed Østblokka (the East Bloc).

=== Rivalries ===
Vålerenga's main rivals include Lillestrøm, Ham Kam, Kongsvinger, Brann and Lyn. Since the 90s, the main supporter club has actively worked hard for social issues and against hooliganism. Despite this, as recently as 2019, isolated individuals within the club's support have engaged in disruptive and dangerous activities during live matches.

=== Celebrity fans ===
Vålerenga has many prominent fans from different walks of life, including sports stars, politics and culture.

Musicians, artists and media

- Aage Borchgrevink – Human rights activist
- Ane Dahl Torp – Actress
- Aleksander Schau – TV Personality
- Arve Opsahl, Actor
- Aslak Borgersrud – Musician
- Don Martin – rapper and hip-hop artist
- Cezinando, Musician
- Girl in Red, Singer-songwriter
- Jeppe Beck Laursen, Actor
- Johan Golden, Comedian
- Jon Hernæs, Former bass player with Gluecifer and podcaster
- Jonas Bals, Anti fascist historian, writer, podcaster
- Kasper Wikestad, Journalist
- Rolf Søder, Actor, singer
- Mina Finstad Berg, Journalist
- Trond Espen Seim, Actor
- Stephen Graham, Actor
- Sven Nordin, Actor
- Tobias Santelmann, Actor
- Undergrunn, Band
- Vita & Wanda Mashadi, Influencers

Politicians

- Agnes Nærland Viljugrein – Labor party MP
- Andreas Halse – Labor party politician
- Christian Tybring-Gjedde, Progress Party
- Marianne Borgen – Former mayor of Oslo, Labor party
- Ola Elvestuen, Former Liberal party deputy leader, minister of climate and the environment
- Raymond Johansen – former Labor party Governing Mayor of Oslo
- Siv Jensen, Former Progress Party leader, minister of finance and MP.
- Tonje Brenna, Labor party parliamentary leader
- Trine Skei Grande, Former Liberal party leader, education minister

Athletes and other sports personalities

- Adrian Hagen – Boxer
- Anders Krystad – Fan club founder, football executive
- Christian Borchgrevink – Football player, son of Aage Borchgrevink
- Eivind Henriksen, Olympic athlete, Hammer Throw
- Freddy dos Santos, Former player
- Henrik Kristoffersen, Alpine ski racer
- Kjetil Rekdal, Football manager
- Kristoffer Klaesson, Football player
- Mats Zuccarello, Professional hockey player
- Pål Enger, Former player and prominent art thief

Other

- Eirik Kristoffersen, General, Head of the Norwegian Armed Forces
- Tor Olav Trøim, Businessman

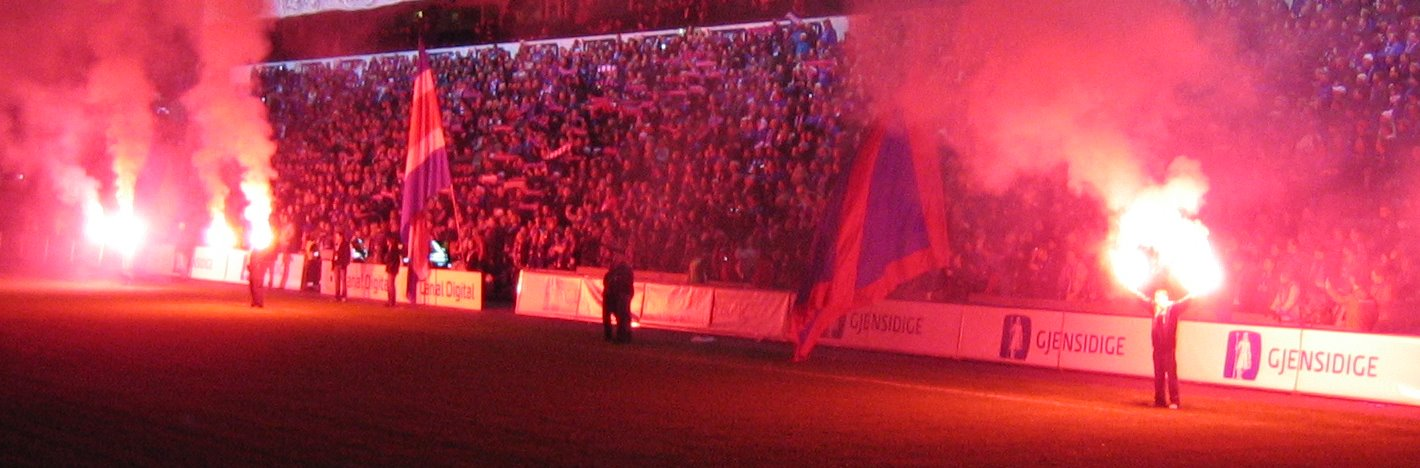
Klanen celebrating the bronze medal after the final game of the 2006 season

== Honours ==
- Eliteserien:
  - Winners (5): 1965, 1981, 1983, 1984, 2005
  - Runners-up (3): 1948–49, 2004, 2010
- Norwegian Cup:
  - Winners (4): 1980, 1997, 2002, 2008
  - Runners-up (2): 1983, 1985
- Norwegian First Division/Landsdelsserien:
  - Winners (7): 1953–54, 1958–59, 1976, 1993, 1997, 2001, 2024
- Superfinalen:
  - Runners-up (1): 2009

== Recent seasons ==
Season	League											Cup	Other competitions			Top goalscorer		Ref(s)
Season	Division	P	W	D	L	GF	GA	GD	Pts	Pos	Att	Cup	CL	EL	ECL	Name	Goals	Ref(s)
1999	Tippeligaen	26	8	4	14	40	53	−13	28	11th	6,626	4R	—	—	—	Pascal Simpson	8	
2000	Tippeligaen	26	5	9	12	32	44	−12	24	↓ 12th	7,630	QF	—	—	—	Kjetil Rekdal	6	
2001	1. divisjon	30	19	8	3	71	29	+42	62	↑ 1st	—N/a	QF	—	—	—	Kjetil Rekdal	11	
2002	Tippeligaen	26	7	12	7	38	31	+7	33	8th	8,782	W	—	—	—	David Hanssen	7	
2003	Tippeligaen	26	6	10	10	30	33	−3	28	12th	9,336	QF	—	3R	—	Freddy dos Santos	10	
2004	Tippeligaen	26	13	9	4	40	22	+18	48	2nd	14,392	3R	—	—	—	Freddy dos Santos	8	
2005	Tippeligaen	26	13	7	6	40	27	+13	46	1st	15,658	SF	3QR	1R	—	Morten Berre	9	
2006	Tippeligaen	26	13	5	8	43	28	+15	44	3rd	13,873	QF	2QR	—	—	Jan-Derek Sørensen	9	
2007	Tippeligaen	26	10	6	10	34	34	0	36	7th	13,837	4R	—	1R	—	Morten Berre	9	
2008	Tippeligaen	26	8	6	12	31	37	−6	30	10th	12,700	W	—	—	—	Mohammed Abdellaoue	9	
2009	Tippeligaen	30	12	4	14	47	50	−3	40	7th	10,788	SF	—	3QR	—	Bengt Sæternes	11	
2010	Tippeligaen	30	19	4	7	69	36	+33	61	2nd	13,646	2R	—	—	—	Mohammed Abdellaoue	15	
2011	Tippeligaen	30	14	5	11	42	33	+9	47	7th	13,331	2R	—	3QR	—	Bojan Zajić	8	
2012	Tippeligaen	30	12	5	13	42	44	−2	41	8th	10,768	3R	—	—	—	Marcus Pedersen	8	
2013	Tippeligaen	30	10	6	14	41	50	−9	36	11th	9,900	QF	—	—	—	Morten Berre	10	
2014	Tippeligaen	30	11	9	10	59	53	+6	42	6th	9,751	4R	—	—	—	Viðar Örn Kjartansson	25	
2015	Tippeligaen	30	14	7	9	49	41	+8	49	7th	10,099	2R	—	—	—	Daniel Fredheim Holm; Deshorn Brown; Ghayas Zahid	7	
2016	Tippeligaen	30	10	8	12	41	39	+2	38	10th	9,074	QF	—	—	—	Ghayas Zahid	8	
2017	Eliteserien	30	11	6	13	48	46	+2	39	8th	9,703	SF	—	—	—	Herman Stengel	6	
2018	Eliteserien	30	11	9	10	39	44	−5	42	6th	9,180	QF	—	—	—	Sam Johnson	11	
2019	Eliteserien	30	8	10	12	39	44	−5	34	10th	7,834	3R	—	—	—	Bård Finne	8	
2020	Eliteserien	30	15	10	5	51	33	+18	55	3rd	200	Cancelled	—	—	—	Viðar Örn Kjartansson	9	
2021	Eliteserien	30	11	12	7	46	37	+9	45	7th	4,318	3R	—	—	2QR	Aron Dønnum; Henrik Udahl	6	
2022	Eliteserien	30	13	5	12	52	49	+3	44	6th	8,670	3R	—	—	—	Amor Layouni	8	
2023	Eliteserien	30	7	8	15	39	50	-11	29	↓ 14th	10,542	SF	—	—	—	Andrej Ilić	9	
2024	OBOS-ligaen	30	21	6	3	82	31	+51	69	↑ 1st	10,542	QF	—	—	—	Jones El-Abdellaoui; Mees Rijks	13	
2025	Eliteserien	30	13	4	13	49	50	-1	43	6th	8,670	1R	—	—	—	Elias Sørensen	12	
2026 (in progress)	Eliteserien	27	9	5	13	44	49	-5	32	8th	8,670	3R	—	—	—	Lucas Haren	11	

== European record ==
=== Summary ===
Competition	Pld	W	D	L	GF	GA	Last season played
European Cup; UEFA Champions League	14	4	3	7	17	25	2006–07
UEFA Cup; UEFA Europa League	24	6	9	9	21	28	2011–12
UEFA Europa Conference League	2	1	0	1	2	4	2021–22
UEFA Cup Winners' Cup	8	1	4	3	11	17	1998–99
UEFA Intertoto Cup	2	1	0	1	1	2	1999
Inter-Cities Fairs Cup	4	0	0	4	5	13	1965–66
Total	54	13	16	25	57	89	

Source: uefa.com, Last updated on 29 July 2021
Pld = Matches played; W = Matches won; D = Matches drawn; L = Matches lost; GF = Goals for; GA = Goals against. Defunct competitions indicated in italics.
Notes: This summary includes matches played in the Inter-Cities Fairs Cup, which was not endorsed by UEFA and is not counted in UEFA's official European statistics.

=== List of matches ===
Season	Competition	Round	Opponent	Home	Away	Agg.
1964–65	Inter-Cities Fairs Cup	R1	(England) Everton	2–5	2–4	4–9
1965–66	Inter-Cities Fairs Cup	R2	(Scotland) Hearts	1–3	0–1	1–4
1966–67	European Cup	R1	(Albania) 17 Nëntori	N/A	N/A	w/o
1966–67	European Cup	R2	(Northern Ireland) Linfield	1–4	1–1	2–5
1975–76	UEFA Cup	R1	(Republic of Ireland) Athlone Town	1–1	1–3	2–4
1981–82	Cup Winners' Cup	R1	(Poland) Legia Warszawa	2–2	1–4	3–6
1982–83	European Cup	PR	(Romania) Dinamo București	2–1	1–3	3–4
1984–85	European Cup	R1	(Czechoslovakia) Sparta Prague	3–3	0–2	3–5
1985–86	European Cup	R1	(Soviet Union) Zenit Leningrad	0–2	0–2	0–4
1986–87	UEFA Cup	R1	(Belgium) Beveren	0–0	0–1	0–1
1998–99	Cup Winners' Cup	R1	(Romania) Rapid București	0–0	2–2	2–2 (a)
1998–99	Cup Winners' Cup	R2	(Turkey) Beşiktaş	1–0	3–3	4–3
1998–99	Cup Winners' Cup	QF	(England) Chelsea	2–3	0–3	2–6
1999–00	Intertoto Cup	R1	(Latvia) Ventspils	1–0	0–2	1–2
2003–04	UEFA Cup	R1	(Austria) Grazer AK	0–0	1–1	1–1 (a)
2003–04	UEFA Cup	R2	(Poland) Wisła Kraków	0–0	0–0	0–0 (4–3 p)
2003–04	UEFA Cup	R3	(England) Newcastle United	1–1	1–3	2–4
2005–06	Champions League	QR2	(Finland) Haka	1–0	4–1	5–1
2005–06	Champions League	QR3	(Belgium) Club Brugge	1–0	0–1	1–1 (3–4 p)
2005–06	UEFA Cup	R1	(Romania) Steaua București	0–3	1–3	1–6
2006–07	Champions League	QR2	(Czech Republic) Mladá Boleslav	2–2	1–3	3–5
2007–08	UEFA Cup	QR1	(Estonia) Flora Tallinn	1–0	1–0	2–0
2007–08	UEFA Cup	QR2	(Lithuania) Ekranas	6–0	1–1	7–1
2007–08	UEFA Cup	R1	Austria Wien	2–2	0–2	2–4
2009–10	Europa League	QR3	(Greece) PAOK	1–2	1–0	2–2 (a)
2011–12	Europa League	QR2	(Armenia) Mika	1–0	1–0	2–0
2011–12	Europa League	QR3	(Greece) PAOK	0–2	0–3	0–5
2021–22	Europa Conference League	QR2	(Belgium) Gent	2–0	0–4	2−4

== Records ==
- Largest victory in the top division: 8–0 vs. Lisleby, 1951
- Longest consecutive seasons in the top division: 17 seasons (2002–2023)
- Most top division matches since 1963: (Norway) Morten Berre, 281 matches (2003–14)
- Most goals in mandatory matches: (Norway) Einar Bruno Larsen, 99 goals (1957–68)
- Most goals in a single season: (Iceland) Viðar Örn Kjartansson, 25 goals in 29 matches (2014)
- Record attendance: Ullevaal Stadion, 23 October 2005. The 2005 season's last home game, against Rosenborg, 24894 spectators
- Biggest win in a European cup match: 6–0 vs. (Lithuania) Ekranas, 30 August 2007 (7–1 overall)

(numbers as of 3 September 2007)

== Players and staff ==
=== First-team squad ===
As of 2 September 2026

Note: Flags indicate national team as defined under FIFA eligibility rules; some limited exceptions apply. Players may hold more than one non-FIFA nationality.

No.	Pos.	Nation	Player
1	GK	DEN	Oscar Hedvall
2	DF	ISL	Kolbeinn Finnsson
3	DF	NOR	Håkon Sjåtil
4	DF	NOR	Aaron Kiil Olsen
5	DF	DEN	Kevin Tshiembe
6	DF	NOR	Vegar Eggen Hedenstad
7	FW	NOR	Håvard Nielsen
9	FW	NOR	Gabriel Rajkovic
10	MF	DEN	Carl Lange
11	MF	NOR	Ghayas Zahid
13	GK	NOR	Sander Lønning
15	MF	NOR	Odin Thiago Holm (on loan from Celtic)
17	FW	NOR	Mathias Grundetjern
18	MF	NOR	Evenezer Awasum Forcha

No.	Pos.	Nation	Player
19	FW	KOS	Elbasan Rashani
20	FW	NOR	Lorents Apold-Aasen
24	MF	NOR	Petter Strand
25	DF	GBS	Mario Gomes (on loan from Bissau Stars Academy)
26	FW	NOR	Dennis Gjengaar
28	MF	DEN	Magnus Westergaard
29	MF	CMR	Brice Ambina
30	GK	NOR	Alexander Svensen Ordal
31	MF	NOR	Omar Bully Drammeh
37	DF	NOR	Ivan Näsberg
55	DF	NOR	Sebastian Jarl
77	FW	DEN	Lucas Haren
90	FW	NOR	Ole Sæter

=== Out on loan ===
Note: Flags indicate national team as defined under FIFA eligibility rules; some limited exceptions apply. Players may hold more than one non-FIFA nationality.

No.	Pos.	Nation	Player
15	MF	NOR	Elias Hagen (at Aalesund until 31 December 2026)
21	GK	NOR	Magnus Sjøeng (at Start until 31 December 2026)

No.	Pos.	Nation	Player
22	MF	NOR	Stian Sjøvold Thorstensen (at Ranheim until 31 December 2026)
23	DF	FIN	Noah Pallas (at Ranheim until 31 December 2026)

=== Notable past players and staff ===
- (Serbia) Andrej Ilić
- (Finland) Aki Riihilahti
- (Denmark) Allan Kierstein Jepsen
- (Iceland) Arni Gautur Arason
- (Norway) Aron Dønnum
- (Norway) Bjørn Arild Levernes
- (Serbia) Bojan Zajic
- (Norway) Christian Grindheim
- (Norway) Daniel Fredheim Holm
- (Finland) Daniel Håkans
- (Belgium) David Brocken
- (Jamaica) Deshorn Brown
- (Norway) Einar Bruno Larsen
- (Norway) Egil Olsen
- (Norway) Erik Foss
- (Norway) Erik Hagen
- (Nigeria) Fegor Ogude
- (Norway) Felix Horn Myhre
- (Norway) Freddy dos Santos
- (Costa Rica) Giancarlo Gonzalez
- (Norway) Ghayas Zahid
- (Sweden) Gunder Bengtsson
- (Norway) Henning Berg
- (Norway) Henry Johansen
- (Norway) Jones El-Abdellaoui
- (Norway) John Carew
- (Norway) Jørn Andersen
- (Norway) Kjell Roar Kaasa
- (Norway) Kjetil Rekdal
- (Norway) Kjetil Wæhler
- (Norway) Kristofer Hæstad
- (Norway) Lars Bohinen
- (Canada) Lars Hirschfeld
- (Jamaica) Luton Shelton
- (Norway) Martin Andresen
- (Norway) Mohammed Abdellaoue
- (Norway) Mohammed Fellah
- (Norway) Morten Berre
- (Norway) Nils Arne Eggen
- (Norway) Odin Thiago Holm
- (Norway) Odd Iversen
- (Norway) Osame Sahraoui
- (Norway) Pa-Modou Kah
- (Sweden) Pascal Simpson
- (Norway) Ronny Deila
- (Norway) Ronny Johnsen
- (Canada) Sam Adekugbe
- (Norway) Simen Juklerød
- (Norway) Steffen Iversen
- (Norway) Thomas Holm
- (Sweden) Tobias Grahn
- (Norway) Tom Henning Hovi
- (Norway) Tore Krogstad
- (United States) Troy Perkins
- (Norway) Tore Andre Flo
- (Norway) Vidar Davidsen
- (Iceland) Vidar Orn Kjartansson

=== Retired and reserved numbers ===
- Number 12 is reserved for the fans (often referred to as the 12th man)

=== Coaching staff ===
Position	Name
Director of football	(Sweden) Joacim Jonsson
Head coach	(Norway) Johannes Moesgaard
Assistant coach	(Norway) Vetle Rygh
First Team coach	(Norway) Knut Rønningene
Goalkeeper coach	(Poland) Lukasz Jarosinski
Fitness coach	(England) Aaron Horne
Head of analysis	(Norway) Lars-Erik Samuelsen
Head of academy	(Norway) Thomas Hafstad
Reserve team coach	(Norway) Øystein Sanden
Physio	(Norway) Carl Fredrik Birkemo
Physio	(Norway) Martin Flesland
Equipment manager	(Norway) Egil Larsen
Club doctor	(Norway) Erik Rosenlund

== Managers ==
- Henry "Tippen" Johansen (1944)
- Kristian "Svarten" Henriksen (1947–48)
- Henry "Tippen" Johansen (1949)
- Willibald Hahn (1955)
- Kristian "Svarten" Henriksen (1957–58)
- Knut "Bossen" Osnes (1962)
- Joar Hoff (1978)
- Gunder Bengtsson (1983), (1984)
- Olle Nordin (1985)
- Svein Ivar Sigernes (1987–88)
- Olle Nordin (1 Jan 1990 – Dec 31, 1992)
- Vidar Davidsen (1 Jan 1993 – Dec 31, 1997)
- Lars Tjærnås (1 Jan 1998 – Aug 6, 1998)
- Egil "Drillo" Olsen (9 Aug 1998 – June 16, 1999)
- Knut Arild Løberg (17 June 1999 – Dec 31, 1999)
- Tom Nordlie (1 Jan 2000 – Dec 31, 2000)
- Kjetil Rekdal (1 Jan 2001 – Aug 20, 2006)
- Petter Myhre (21 Aug 2006 – July 27, 2007)
- Harald Aabrekk (28 July 2007 – Dec 31, 2007)
- Martin Andresen (2008 – Dec 31, 2012)
- Kjetil Rekdal (8 Jan 2013– 31 Dec 2016)
- Ronny Deila (1 Jan 2017 – 6 Jan 2020)
- Dag-Eilev Fagermo (31 Jan 2020 – 12 June 2023)
- Geir Bakke (12 July 2023 – 6 May 2026)
- Petter Myhre (interim) (6 May 2026 – )

== See also ==
- Vålerenga Ishockey
- Vålerenga Trolls
