= List of Toppserien clubs =

The following is a list of clubs who have played in the top flight of Norwegian women's football since its establishment in 1984. All statistics here refer to time in the Norwegian top flight only, with the exception of 'Most Recent Finish' (which refers to all levels of play) and 'Last Promotion' (which refers to the club's last promotion from the second tier of Norwegian women's football). Toppserien teams playing in the 2026 season are indicated in bold. Clubs labeled as "defunct" may be fully dissolved, or simply no longer active in football at a senior women's level as of the end of the 2025 season.

As of the 2026 season, a total of 74 teams have played in the Norwegian top flight.

== Table ==
As of the start of the 2026 season

Club	Municipality	Total seasons	Total spells	Longest spell	Current spell	Most recent promotion	Most recent relegation	Seasons	Most recent finish	Highest finish
**LSK Kvinner**	Lillestrøm	43	1	43	43	Never promoted	Never relegated	1984–1988 (as Setskog IF); 1989–2000 (as Setskog/Høland FK); 2001–2009 (as Team Strømmen); 2010–	4th	1st
**Rosenborg**	Trondheim	43	1	43	43	Never promoted	Never relegated	1984–2019 (as SK Trondheims-Ørn); 2020–	3rd	1st
Klepp	Klepp	37	1	37	0	1984	2021	1985–2021	2. divisjon Group 1; 1st; (promoted)	1st
**Brann**	Bergen	36	7	12	12	2014	2013	1984–1989; 1991–1999; 2002; 2004–2007; 2009; 2011–2013; 2015–2021 (as IL Sandviken); 2022–	1st	1st
Kolbotn	Nordre Follo	30	2	28	0	2023	2025	1995–2022; 2024–2025	10th (relegated)	1st
Arna-Bjørnar	Bergen	28	3	19	0	2005	2024	1986 (as Ådnamarka IL); 1997–2000 (as Bjørnar IL); 2001–2004; 2006–2024	1. divisjon 5th	3rd
**Røa**	Oslo	25	2	20	5	2021	2020	2001–2020; 2022–	9th	1st
Asker (defunct)	Asker	24	2	22	0	2006	2008	1984–2005; 2007–2008	4. divisjon Oslo; 7th; (2024)	1st
Athene Moss (defunct)	Moss	18	1	18	0	Never promoted	2001	1984–1996 (as SK Sprint-Jeløy); 1997–2001	10th (relegated) (2001)	1st
**Stabæk**	Bærum	17	2	11	6	2020	2019	2009–2019; 2021–	5th	1st
**Vålerenga**	Oslo	15	1	15	15	2011	Never relegated	2012–	2nd	1st
Fløya	Tromsø	13	5	8	0	2002	2010	1986; 1990; 1993–1994; 1998; 2003–2010	3. divisjon Finnmark/Troms; 7th	3rd
Grand Bodø	Bodø	12	7	3	0	2016	2018	1986–1987; 1991–1993; 1995; 1999–2000; 2007; 2014; 2017–2018	3. divisjon Nordland; 6th	3rd
**Haugesund**	Haugesund	12	2	11	1	2025	2023	2013–2023 (as Avaldsnes IL); 2026–	1. divisjon 2nd; (promoted)	2nd
Bøler (defunct)	Oslo	11	2	9	0	1995	1997	1984–1992; 1996–1997	1. divisjon Group 2; 6th; (1998)	5th
Amazon Grimstad	Grimstad	10	1	10	0	2005	2015	2006–2015	2. divisjon Group 1; 4th	6th
**Lyn**	Oslo	9	1	9	9	2017	Never relegated	2018–	7th	6th
Jardar (defunct)	Bærum	8	3	3	0	1991	1993	1984–1986; 1988–1990; 1992–1993	1. divisjon Group 1; 8th; (relegated) (1999)	7th
BUL (defunct)	Oslo	7	2	5	0	1989	1991	1984–1988; 1990–1991	Defunct since 1993	7th
Kattem (defunct)	Trondheim	7	2	6	0	2006	2012	2005; 2007–2012	11th (relegated) (2012)	8th
Medkila	Harstad	7	3	5	0	2012	2017	2004; 2011; 2013–2017	2. divisjon Group 2; 4th	9th
Haugar	Haugesund	5	2	3	0	1993	1996	1984–1985; 1994–1996	3. divisjon Rogaland; 8th	7th
Skedsmo	Lillestrøm	5	2	3	0	1988	1991	1985–1986; 1989–1991	4. divisjon Akershus; 9th	6th
Byåsen	Trondheim	4	2	3	0	1999	2002	1998; 2000–2002	4. divisjon Trøndelag; Group 4; 2nd	7th
Donn	Kristiansand	4	2	3	0	2009	2010	1993–1995; 2010	4. divisjon Agder; 3rd	4th
Heimdal	Trondheim	4	2	3	0	1987	1988	1984–1986; 1988	4. divisjon Trøndelag; Group 2; 7th	9th
Larvik (defunct)	Larvik	4	3	2	0	2007	2008	2000; 2002–2003; 2008	1. divisjon 8th; (relegated) (2009)	8th
Liungen (defunct)	Lier	4	3	2	0	2004	2006	2001; 2003; 2005–2006	3. divisjon Buskerud; 2nd; (2008)	4th
Troll (defunct)	Rindal	4	1	4	0	Never promoted	1987	1984–1987	9th (relegated) (1987)	9th
Vard (defunct)	Haugesund	4	2	3	0	1988	1989	1984–1986; 1989	4. divisjon Rogaland; Group 3; 2nd; (2023)	10th
Verdal	Verdal	4	2	3	0	1996	1997	1984–1986; 1997	4. divisjon Trøndelag; Group 1; 1st; (promoted)	10th
Alvdal (defunct)	Alvdal	3	1	3	0	Never promoted	1986	1984–1986	4. divisjon Trøndelag; Group 4; 5th; (2019)	6th Group Trøndelag
Fart	Hamar	3	3	1	0	2018	2019	2008; 2012; 2019	5. divisjon Indre Østland; Group 2; 3rd	12th
Moelven (defunct)	Ringsaker	3	1	3	0	Never promoted	1986	1984–1986	4. divisjon Indre Østland; Group 2; 5th; (2022)	7th Group Østlandet
Nymark	Bergen	3	1	3	0	Never promoted	1986	1984–1986	4. divisjon Hordaland; 9th	1st
Sunndal	Sunndal	3	1	3	0	Never promoted	1986	1984–1986	4. divisjon Nordmøre og Romsdal; 3rd	4th Group Trøndelag
Viking	Stavanger	3	1	3	0	Never promoted	1986	1984–1986	1. divisjon 10th	3rd Group Vestlandet
**Aalesund**	Ålesund	2	2	1	1	2025	2009	2009 (as FK Fortuna); 2026–	1. divisjon 1st; (promoted)	12th
**Bodø/Glimt**	Bodø	2	1	2	2	2024	Never relegated	2025–	8th	8th
Fyllingen (defunct)	Bergen	2	1	2	0	Never promoted	1985	1984–1985	4. divisjon Hordaland; Group 1; 1st; (promoted) (2011)	7th Group Vestlandet
Hald (defunct)	Øygarden	2	1	2	0	1984	1986	1985–1986	3. divisjon Hordaland; 6th; (2010)	5th Group Vestlandet
**Hønefoss**	Ringerike	2	1	2	2	2024	Never relegated	2025–	6th	6th
Kaupanger (defunct)	Sogndal	2	2	1	0	1998	1999	1986; 1999	2. divisjon Group 4; 5th; (relegated)(2021)	10th
Kvik (defunct)	Trondheim	2	1	2	0	1984	1986	1985–1986	Defunct since 1998	8th Group Trøndelag
Linderud-Grei (defunct)	Oslo	2	1	2	0	2009	2011	2010–2011	1. divisjon 8th; (2012)	11th
Mathopen (defunct)	Bergen	2	1	2	0	Never promoted	1985	1984–1985	5. divisjon Hordaland; Group 1; 10th; (2019)	6th Group Vestlandet
**Molde**	Molde	2	2	1	1	2025	1994	1994; 2026–	1. divisjon 3rd; (promoted)	10th
Namsos	Namsos	2	1	2	0	Never promoted	1985	1984–1985	4. divisjon Trøndelag; Group 1; 5th	7th Group Trøndelag
Nessegutten (defunct)	Levanger	2	2	1	0	1985	1986	1984; 1986	3. divisjon Trøndelag; Group 1; 3rd; (2007)	6th Group Trøndelag
Nybergsund (defunct)	Trysil	2	1	2	0	Never promoted	1985	1984–1985	Defunct	9th Group Østlandet
Skjold	Tysvær	2	2	1	0	1985	1986	1984; 1986	4. divisjon Rogaland; Group 2; 4th	8th Group Vestlandet
Skudenes	Karmøy	2	1	2	0	1985	1986	1985–1986	4. divisjon Rogaland; Group 2; 8th	7th Group Vestlandet
Surnadal (defunct)	Surnadal	2	1	2	0	1985	1986	1985–1986	3. divisjon Nordmøre og Romsdal; 8th; (relegated)	2nd Group Trøndelag
Tolga (defunct)	Tolga	2	1	2	0	Never promoted	1985	1984–1985	3. divisjon Trøndelag; 5th; (2005)	5th Group Trøndelag
Åsane	Bergen	2	1	2	0	2022	2024	2023–2024	1. divisjon 4th	8th
Alta	Alta	1	1	1	0	1985	1986	1986	3. divisjon Finnmark/Troms; 2nd	9th Group Nord-Norge
Bossekop	Alta	1	1	1	0	1985	1986	1986	4. divisjon Finnmark; 2nd	5th Group Nord-Norge
Folldal (defunct)	Folldal	1	1	1	0	Never promoted	1984	1984	Defunct	10th Group Trøndelag
Fonna (defunct)	Ullensvang	1	1	1	0	Never promoted	1984	1984	Defunct	10th Group Vestlandet
Frei (defunct)	Kristiansund	1	1	1	0	1985	1986	1986	Defunct since 1997	9th Group Trøndelag
Gjelleråsen (defunct)	Nittedal	1	1	1	0	1995	1996	1996	3. divisjon Akershus; 1st; (2019)	10th
Hakadal (defunct)	Nittedal	1	1	1	0	1984	1985	1985	4. divisjon Akershus; 8th; (2018)	9th Group Østlandet
Heimhug (defunct)	Saltdal	1	1	1	0	1985	1986	1986	Defunct	8th Group Nord-Norge
Høland (defunct)	Aurskog-Høland	1	1	1	0	1985	1986	1986	Defunct	8th Group Østlandet
Karnes (defunct)	Lyngen	1	1	1	0	1985	1986	1986	Defunct since 1990	7th Group Nord-Norge
Radar (defunct)	Kristiansand	1	1	1	0	Never promoted	1984	1984	3. divisjon Agder; Group 1; 5th; (2014)	6th Group Østlandet
Samnanger (defunct)	Samnanger	1	1	1	0	Never promoted	1984	1984	4. divisjon Hordaland; Group 2; 10th; (relegated) (2011)	9th Group Vestlandet
Sandnessjøen (defunct)	Alstahaug	1	1	1	0	1985	1986	1986	3. divisjon Nordland; 5th; (2024)	6th Group Nord-Norge
Skarp	Tromsø	1	1	1	0	1985	1986	1986	3. divisjon Finnmark/Troms; 7th	4th Group Nord-Norge
Skidar (defunct)	Skien	1	1	1	0	1985	1986	1986	Defunct	10th Group Østlandet
Spjelkavik (defunct)	Ålesund	1	1	1	0	1991	1992	1992	3. divisjon Sunnmøre; 9th; (relegated)	10th
Trondenes (defunct)	Harstad	1	1	1	0	1985	1986	1986	Defunct since 1990	3rd Group Nord-Norge
Ulfstind (defunct)	Tromsø	1	1	1	0	1985	1986	1986	3. divisjon Troms; Group 1; 8th; (2019)	10th Group Nord-Norge
Urædd	Porsgrunn	1	1	1	0	2015	2016	2016	4. divisjon Telemark; 6th	12th
Vindbjart	Vennesla	1	1	1	0	Never promoted	1984	1984	4. divisjon Agder; 3rd	10th Group Østlandet

== Map ==
Current Toppserien teams are in bold. Defunct clubs are in italics.
