= 1986 Norwegian First Division (women) =

1. divisjon (women)
- Season: 1986
- Champions: Sprint/Jeløy; 2nd title
- Relegated: 30 teams

The 1986 1. divisjon (women) was the third season of a top-tier women's football league in Norway, and was won by Sprint-Jeløy. The league was contested by 40 teams, divided in four groups of ten teams. It was the first year that teams from Nord Norge contested in the top league.

In each group, the teams met each other twice in a round-robin, with 2 points given for a win, and 1 point for a draw. This was the last season that the league was divided into more than one group, so 30 of the 40 teams were relegated to Second Division.

Sprint-Jeløy won the championship playoff after beating Troll in the final, while Klepp and Grand finished third. These four teams, in addition to Asker, BUL, Bøler, Setskog, Sandviken and Trondheims-Ørn, were the only teams that weren't relegated this year.

== League tables ==
=== Group Østlandet ===
| Pos | Team | Pld | W | D | L | GF | GA | GD | Pts | Qualification or relegation |
|---|---|---|---|---|---|---|---|---|---|---|
| 1 | Sprint-Jeløy (C) | 18 | 12 | 3 | 3 | 35 | 7 | +28 | 27 | Championship Play-off |
| 2 | Asker | 18 | 10 | 5 | 3 | 34 | 14 | +20 | 25 | |
| 3 | BUL | 18 | 8 | 6 | 4 | 33 | 18 | +15 | 22 | |
| 4 | Bøler | 18 | 7 | 6 | 5 | 15 | 22 | −7 | 20 | |
| 5 | Setskog | 18 | 4 | 11 | 3 | 24 | 21 | +3 | 19 | |
| 6 | Jardar | 18 | 7 | 4 | 7 | 37 | 30 | +7 | 18 | Relegated |
| 7 | Skedsmo | 18 | 6 | 4 | 8 | 14 | 19 | −5 | 16 | Relegated |
| 8 | Høland | 18 | 4 | 6 | 8 | 21 | 31 | −10 | 14 | Relegated |
| 9 | Moelven | 18 | 3 | 4 | 11 | 11 | 32 | −21 | 10 | Relegated |
| 10 | Skidar | 18 | 3 | 3 | 12 | 17 | 47 | −30 | 9 | Relegated |

(C) Champions

=== Group Vestlandet ===
| Pos | Team | Pld | W | D | L | GF | GA | GD | Pts | Qualification or relegation |
|---|---|---|---|---|---|---|---|---|---|---|
| 1 | Klepp | 18 | 14 | 3 | 1 | 80 | 11 | +69 | 31 | Championship Play-off |
| 2 | Sandviken | 18 | 14 | 2 | 2 | 93 | 16 | +77 | 30 | |
| 3 | Nymark | 18 | 12 | 3 | 3 | 50 | 14 | +36 | 27 | Relegated |
| 4 | Vard | 18 | 10 | 2 | 6 | 35 | 34 | +1 | 22 | Relegated |
| 5 | Hald | 18 | 7 | 3 | 8 | 29 | 35 | −6 | 17 | Relegated |
| 6 | Viking | 18 | 7 | 2 | 9 | 26 | 39 | −13 | 16 | Relegated |
| 7 | Kaupanger | 18 | 5 | 3 | 10 | 22 | 39 | −17 | 13 | Relegated |
| 8 | Skudenes | 18 | 5 | 1 | 12 | 19 | 61 | −42 | 11 | Relegated |
| 9 | Skjold | 18 | 5 | 0 | 13 | 13 | 49 | −36 | 10 | Relegated |
| 10 | Ådnamarka | 18 | 1 | 1 | 16 | 14 | 83 | −69 | 3 | Relegated |

=== Group Trøndelag ===
| Pos | Team | Pld | W | D | L | GF | GA | GD | Pts | Qualification or relegation |
|---|---|---|---|---|---|---|---|---|---|---|
| 1 | Troll | 18 | 16 | 1 | 1 | 84 | 11 | +73 | 33 | Championship Play-off |
| 2 | Trondheims-Ørn | 18 | 15 | 1 | 2 | 71 | 8 | +63 | 31 | |
| 3 | Surnadal | 18 | 10 | 4 | 4 | 38 | 18 | +20 | 24 | Relegated |
| 4 | Heimdal | 18 | 8 | 3 | 7 | 33 | 32 | +1 | 19 | Relegated |
| 5 | Verdal | 18 | 6 | 5 | 7 | 33 | 39 | −6 | 17 | Relegated |
| 6 | Nessegutten | 18 | 6 | 4 | 8 | 23 | 36 | −13 | 16 | Relegated |
| 7 | Alvdal | 18 | 5 | 4 | 9 | 22 | 53 | −31 | 14 | Relegated |
| 8 | Kvik | 18 | 3 | 7 | 8 | 13 | 36 | −23 | 13 | Relegated |
| 9 | Frei | 18 | 2 | 3 | 13 | 14 | 65 | −51 | 7 | Relegated |
| 10 | Sunndal | 18 | 1 | 4 | 13 | 14 | 47 | −33 | 6 | Relegated |

=== Group Nord-Norge ===
| Pos | Team | Pld | W | D | L | GF | GA | GD | Pts | Qualification or relegation |
|---|---|---|---|---|---|---|---|---|---|---|
| 1 | Grand | 18 | 15 | 2 | 1 | 41 | 15 | +26 | 32 | Championship Play-off |
| 2 | Fløya | 18 | 11 | 5 | 2 | 43 | 10 | +33 | 27 | Relegated |
| 3 | Trondenes | 18 | 12 | 2 | 4 | 39 | 16 | +23 | 26 | Relegated |
| 4 | Skarp | 18 | 10 | 4 | 4 | 27 | 13 | +14 | 24 | Relegated |
| 5 | Bossekop | 18 | 9 | 2 | 7 | 41 | 22 | +19 | 20 | Relegated |
| 6 | Sandnessjøen | 18 | 8 | 3 | 7 | 26 | 26 | 0 | 19 | Relegated |
| 7 | Karnes | 18 | 5 | 2 | 11 | 21 | 42 | −21 | 12 | Relegated |
| 8 | Heimhug | 18 | 4 | 1 | 13 | 16 | 40 | −24 | 9 | Relegated |
| 9 | Alta | 18 | 2 | 2 | 14 | 9 | 45 | −36 | 6 | Relegated |
| 10 | Ulfstind | 18 | 2 | 1 | 15 | 15 | 49 | −34 | 5 | Relegated |

== Championship play-off ==
=== Semifinals ===
The four group-winners met in a championship play-off, contested like a knockout tournament.

11 October 1986

| Grand | 1–4 | Troll |

18 October 1986

| Sprint-Jeløy | 4–3 | Klepp |

=== Final ===
The two winners from the semifinals met in a final, played over two times 40 minutes.

25 October 1986

| Troll | 0–1 | Sprint-Jeløy |
|---|---|---|
| | | Olsen 80' |

Trollbana, Rindal
Attendance: 900
Referee: Knut Skoglund, Rosenborg
