= 1992 Norwegian First Division (women) =

1. divisjon
- Season: 1992
- Champions: Asker; 4th title
- Relegated: Bøler; Spjelkavik
- Matches: 90
- Top goalscorer: (Germany) Petra Bartelmann (22 goals)

The 1992 1. divisjon season, the highest women's football (soccer) league in Norway, began on 25 April 1992 and ended on 17 October 1992.

18 games were played with 3 points given for wins and 1 for draws. Number nine and ten were relegated, while two teams from the 2. divisjon were promoted through a playoff round.

Asker won the league, losing only one game.

== League table ==
Pos	Team	Pld	W	D	L	GF	GA	GD	Pts	Relegation
1	Asker (C)	18	14	3	1	73	17	+56	45	
2	Setskog/Høland	18	12	3	3	51	34	+17	39	
3	Sprint/Jeløy	18	11	3	4	47	27	+20	36	
4	Sandviken	18	10	4	4	56	27	+29	34	
5	Trondheims-Ørn	18	9	4	5	49	31	+18	31	
6	Klepp	18	6	4	8	38	52	−14	22	
7	Grand Bodø	18	5	4	9	28	40	−12	19	
8	Jardar	18	2	5	11	32	55	−23	11	
9	Bøler (R)	18	2	4	12	23	72	−49	10	Relegation to Second Division
10	Spjelkavik (R)	18	1	2	15	23	65	−42	5	Relegation to Second Division

(C) Champions; (R) Relegated

== Top goalscorers ==
- 22 goals:
  - (Germany) Petra Bartelmann, Asker
- 17 goals:
  - (Norway) Birthe Hegstad, Klepp
  - (Norway) Hege Riise, Setskog/Høland
- 16 goals:
  - (Norway) Margunn Humlestøl, Asker
- 15 goals:
  - (Norway) Agnete Carlsen, Sprint/Jeløy
- 12 goals:
  - (Norway) Ann Kristin Aarønes, Spjelkavik
- 11 goals:
  - (Norway) Åse Iren Steine, Sandviken
- 10 goals:
  - (Norway) Elin Krokan, Setskog/Høland
  - (Norway) Eva Gjelten, Trondheims-Ørn
- 9 goals:
  - (Norway) Hilde Dvergsdal, Asker
  - (Norway) Julie Andreassen, Grand Bodø
  - (Norway) Lena Haugen, Setskog/Høland
  - (Norway) Brit Sandaune, Trondheims-Ørn
  - (Norway) Ann Kristin Østgård, Trondheims-Ørn

== Promotion and relegation ==
- Bøler and Spjelkavik were relegated to the 2. divisjon.
- Donn and Fløya were promoted from the 2. divisjon through playoff.
