= 1985 Norwegian First Division (women) =

1. divisjon (women)
- Season: 1985
- Champions: Nymark; 1st title
- Relegated: Hakadal; Nybergsund; Mathopen; Haugar; Fyllingen; Tolga; Namsos

The 1985 1. divisjon (women), was the second season of a top-tier women's football league in Norway, and was won by Nymark. The league was contested by 30 teams, divided in three groups of 10 teams.

In each group, the teams met each other twice in a round-robin, with 2 points given for wins, and 1 point for a draw. At the end of the season, the three group-winners met in a playoff to determine the championship, while the bottom two team from each group was relegated (three teams from the Group Vestlandet).

Nymark won the championship playoff, while Asker finished second and Trondheims-Ørn finished third. At the end of the season, Hakadal, Nybergsund, Mathopen, Haugar, Fyllingen, Tolga and Namsos was relegated.

== League tables ==
=== Group Østlandet ===
Pos	Team	Pld	W	D	L	GF	GA	GD	Pts	Qualification or relegation
1	Asker	18	14	3	1	67	9	+58	31	Championship Play-off
2	Sprint-Jeløy	18	13	4	1	61	13	+48	30	
3	BUL	18	12	4	2	54	13	+41	28	
4	Setskog	18	10	3	5	42	28	+14	23	
5	Bøler	18	8	5	5	34	20	+14	21	
6	Jardar	18	8	3	7	41	35	+6	19	
7	Moelven	18	4	2	12	23	46	−23	10	
8	Skedsmo	18	2	4	12	20	55	−35	8	
9	Hakadal (R)	18	3	2	13	20	73	−53	8	Relegated
10	Nybergsund (R)	18	0	2	16	7	77	−70	2	Relegated

(R) Relegated

=== Group Vestlandet ===
Pos	Team	Pld	W	D	L	GF	GA	GD	Pts	Qualification or relegation
1	Nymark (C)	18	15	3	0	62	14	+48	33	Championship Play-off
2	Sandviken	18	14	2	2	77	25	+52	30	
3	Viking	18	14	1	3	38	11	+27	29	
4	Klepp	18	13	1	4	85	16	+69	27	
5	Vard	18	8	3	7	47	29	+18	19	
6	Hald	18	5	5	8	32	51	−19	15	
7	Skudenes	18	4	3	11	18	60	−42	11	
8	Mathopen (R)	18	3	1	14	23	47	−24	7	Relegated
9	Haugar (R)	18	2	3	13	20	71	−51	7	Relegated
10	Fyllingen (R)	18	1	0	17	11	89	−78	2	Relegated

(C) Champions; (R) Relegated

=== Group Trøndelag ===
Pos	Team	Pld	W	D	L	GF	GA	GD	Pts	Qualification or relegation
1	Trondheims-Ørn	18	18	0	0	105	8	+97	36	Championship Play-off
2	Surnadal	18	13	1	4	36	15	+21	27	
3	Troll	18	11	3	4	56	24	+32	25	
4	Sunndal	18	11	3	4	42	29	+13	25	
5	Verdal	18	7	5	6	26	25	+1	19	
6	Alvdal	18	5	4	9	17	35	−18	14	
7	Tolga (R)	18	3	7	8	14	31	−17	13	Relegated
8	Heimdal	18	3	7	8	15	36	−21	13	
9	Kvik	18	1	3	14	7	62	−55	5	
10	Namsos (R)	18	0	3	15	10	63	−53	3	Relegated

(R) Relegated

== Championship play-off ==
Trondheims-Ørn – Nymark 1-1
Nymark – Asker 1-0
Asker – Trondheims/Ørn 2-1

Pos	Team	Pld	W	D	L	GF	GA	GD	Pts	Result
1	Nymark	2	1	1	0	2	1	+1	3	Gold
2	Asker	2	1	0	1	2	2	0	2	Silver
3	Trondheims-Ørn	2	0	1	1	2	3	−1	1	Bronze
