= Emilie Nautnes =

Norwegian footballer (born 1999)

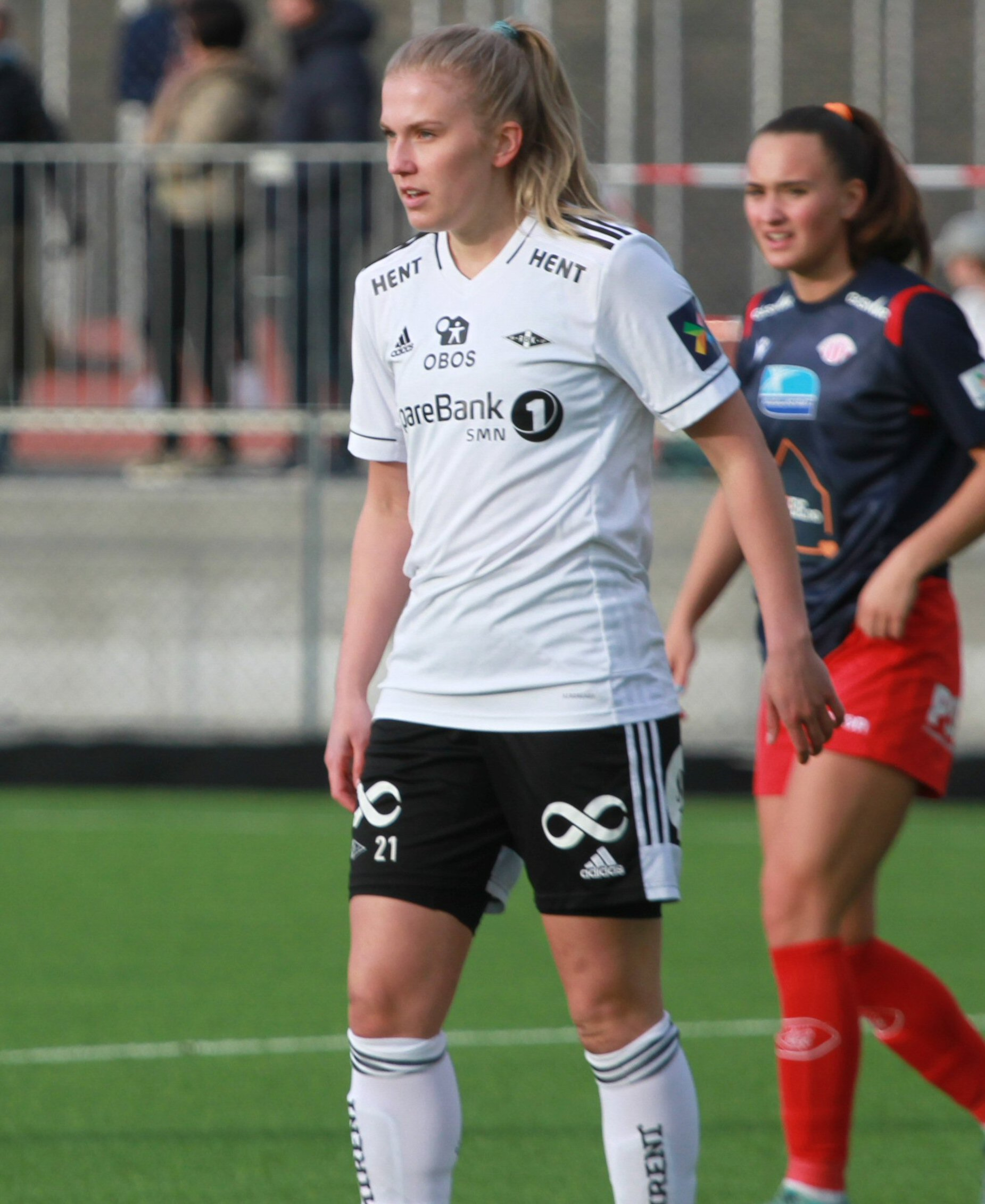
- Soccer player Emilie Nautnes (Rosenborg BK Women)

Personal information
- Date of birth: 13 January 1999 (age 27)
- Position: Forward

Team information
- Current team: Madrid CFF
- Number: 23

Youth career
- Gossen

Senior career*
Years	Team	Apps	(Gls)
2014–2015	Fortuna Ålesund	25	(12)
2015–2019	Arna-Bjørnar	83	(20)
2019	LSK Kvinner	12	(4)
2022–2024	Rosenborg	74	(19)
2025–	Madrid CFF	3	(0)

International career^{‡}
2014	Norway u-16	2	(1)
2015	Norway u-17	6	(6)
2014–2016	Norway u-18	19	(6)
2016–2018	Norway u-20	19	(7)
2017–	Norway u-23	14	(2)
2018–	Norway	9	(1)
- * Club domestic league appearances and goals as of 19 June 2023 ‡ National team caps and goals as of 19 June 2023

Emilie Nautnes (born 13 January 1999) is a Norwegian footballer who plays for Madrid CFF and the Norway women's national football team.

She was selected to the team representing Norway at the 2019 FIFA Women's World Cup.

== Career statistics ==
As of 9 November 2019

Club	Season	Division	League		Cup		Continental		Total	
Club	Season	Division	Apps	Goals	Apps	Goals	Apps	Goals	Apps	Goals
Fortuna Ålesund	2014	1. divisjon	19	10	2	0	-		21	10
Fortuna Ålesund	2015	1. divisjon	6	2	2	2	-		8	4
Fortuna Ålesund	Total		25	12	4	2	-	-	29	14
Arna-Bjørnar	2015	Toppserien	12	3	1	0	-		13	3
Arna-Bjørnar	2016	Toppserien	19	3	2	1	-		21	4
Arna-Bjørnar	2017	Toppserien	21	3	3	4	-		24	7
Arna-Bjørnar	2018	Toppserien	22	8	2	0	-		24	8
Arna-Bjørnar	2019	Toppserien	9	3	1	3	-		10	6
Arna-Bjørnar	Total		83	20	9	8	-	-	92	28
LSK Kvinner	2019	Toppserien	11	1	1	2	-		12	3
LSK Kvinner	Total		11	1	1	2	-	-	12	3
Career total			119	33	14	12	-	-	132	45
