= 1990 Norwegian First Division (women) =

1. divisjon
- Season: 1990
- Champions: Sprint-Jeløy; 3rd title
- Relegated: Fløya; Jardar
- Matches: 90
- Top goalscorer: (Germany) Petra Bartelmann (23 goals)

The 1990 1. divisjon season, the highest women's football (soccer) league in Norway, began on 28 April 1990 and ended on 6 October 1990.

18 games were played with 3 points given for wins and 1 for draws. Number nine and ten were relegated, while two teams from the 2. divisjon were promoted through a playoff round.

Sprint/Jeløy won the league, losing only one game.

== League table ==
Pos	Team	Pld	W	D	L	GF	GA	GD	Pts	Relegation
1	Sprint/Jeløy (C)	18	16	1	1	65	14	+51	49	
2	Asker	18	16	0	2	64	15	+49	48	
3	Klepp	18	9	4	5	40	29	+11	31	
4	Trondheims-Ørn	18	7	5	6	47	33	+14	26	
5	Setskog/Høland	18	6	5	7	37	47	−10	23	
6	Skedsmo	18	7	1	10	28	50	−22	22	
7	BUL	18	5	3	10	29	50	−21	18	
8	Bøler	18	3	7	8	19	35	−16	16	
9	Fløya (R)	18	2	6	10	25	52	−27	12	Relegation to Second Division
10	Jardar (R)	18	2	2	14	22	51	−29	8	Relegation to Second Division

(C) Champions; (R) Relegated

== Top goalscorers ==
- 23 goals:
  - (Germany) Petra Bartelmann, Asker
- 21 goals:
  - (Norway) Hege Riise, Setskog/Høland
- 16 goals:
  - (Norway) Lisbeth Bakken, Sprint/Jeløy
- 11 goals:
  - (Norway) Ann Kristin Hansen, BUL
  - (Norway) Liv Strædet, Sprint/Jeløy
  - (Norway) Eva Gjelten, Trondheims-Ørn
- 10 goals:
  - (Norway) Heidi Støre, Sprint/Jeløy
  - (Norway) Brit Sandaune, Trondheims-Ørn
- 9 goals:
  - (Norway) Eli Landsem, Asker
  - (Norway) Gunn Nyborg, Asker
  - (Norway) Ellen Breiby, Sprint/Jeløy
  - (Norway) Katrin Skarsbø, Sprint/Jeløy

== Promotion and relegation ==
- Fløya and Jardar were relegated to the 2. divisjon.
- Sandviken and Grand Bodø were promoted from the 2. divisjon through play-offs.
