= 1989 Norwegian First Division (women) =

1. divisjon
- Season: 1989
- Champions: Asker; 2nd title
- Relegated: Sandviken; Vard
- Matches: 90
- Top goalscorer: (Norway) Gunn Nyborg (19 goals)

The 1989 1. divisjon season, the highest women's football (soccer) league in Norway, began on 29 April 1989 and ended on 1 October 1989.

18 games were played with 3 points given for wins and 1 for draws. Number nine and ten were relegated, while two teams from the 2. divisjon were promoted through a playoff round.

Asker won the league.

== League table ==
Pos	Team	Pld	W	D	L	GF	GA	GD	Pts	Relegation
1	Asker (C)	18	14	1	3	67	15	+52	43	
2	Sprint/Jeløy	18	12	5	1	57	13	+44	41	
3	Klepp	18	11	3	4	54	29	+25	36	
4	Trondheims-Ørn	18	11	2	5	43	24	+19	35	
5	Bøler	18	6	5	7	34	37	−3	23	
6	Setskog/Høland	18	5	5	8	45	46	−1	20	
7	Skedsmo	18	6	2	10	33	58	−25	20	
8	Jardar	18	4	3	11	32	42	−10	15	
9	Sandviken (R)	18	4	2	12	19	49	−30	14	Relegation to Second Division
10	Vard (R)	18	3	0	15	11	82	−71	9	Relegation to Second Division

(C) Champions; (R) Relegated

== Top goalscorers ==
- 19 goals:
  - (Norway) Gunn Nyborg, Asker
- 18 goals:
  - (Norway) Sissel Grude, Klepp
  - (Norway) Eva Gjelten, Trondheims-Ørn
- 15 goals:
  - (Norway) Lisbeth Bakken, Sprint/Jeløy
- 14 goals:
  - (Norway) Lena Haugen, Setskog/Høland
- 13 goals:
  - (Norway) Linda Medalen, Asker
- 12 goals:
  - (Norway) Turid Storhaug, Klepp
  - (Norway) Hege Riise, Setskog/Høland
- 11 goals:
  - (West Germany) Petra Bartelmann, Asker
  - (Norway) Trude Stendal, Sprint/Jeløy
  - (Norway) Katrin Skarsbø, Sprint/Jeløy
- 10 goals:
  - (Norway) Torill Hoch-Nielsen, Jardar
  - (Norway) Elin Krokan, Skedsmo
  - (Norway) Heidi Støre, Sprint/Jeløy
- 9 goals:
  - (Norway) Lene Olsen, Sprint/Jeløy

== Promotion and relegation ==
- Sandviken and Vard were relegated to the 2. divisjon.
- Fløya and BUL were promoted from the 2. divisjon through play-offs.
