= 1991 Norwegian First Division (women) =

1. divisjon
- Season: 1991
- Champions: Asker; 3rd title
- Relegated: BUL; Skedsmo
- Matches: 90
- Top goalscorer: (Norway) Linda Medalen (29 goals)

The 1991 1. divisjon season, the highest women's football (soccer) league in Norway, began on 27 April 1991 and ended on 12 October 1991.

18 games were played with 3 points given for wins and 1 for draws. Number nine and ten were relegated, while two teams from the 2. divisjon were promoted through a playoff round.

Asker won the league, losing no games.

== League table ==
Pos	Team	Pld	W	D	L	GF	GA	GD	Pts	Relegation
1	Asker (C)	18	16	2	0	88	12	+76	50	
2	Sprint/Jeløy	18	12	4	2	47	20	+27	40	
3	Sandviken	18	11	0	7	29	27	+2	33	
4	Setskog/Høland	18	9	1	8	49	46	+3	28	
5	Klepp	18	6	6	6	32	31	+1	24	
6	Grand Bodø	18	5	4	9	22	42	−20	19	
7	Bøler	18	6	1	11	22	46	−24	19	
8	Trondheims-Ørn	18	5	3	10	34	40	−6	18	
9	BUL (R)	18	5	3	10	28	39	−11	18	Relegation to Second Division
10	Skedsmo (R)	18	1	4	13	20	68	−48	7	Relegation to Second Division

(C) Champions; (R) Relegated

== Top goalscorers ==
- 29 goals:
  - (Norway) Linda Medalen, Asker
- 26 goals:
  - (Germany) Petra Bartelmann, Asker
- 19 goals:
  - (Norway) Hege Riise, Setskog/Høland
- 14 goals:
  - (Norway) Heidi Eivik, Grand Bodø
- 11 goals:
  - (Norway) Lisbeth Bakken, Sprint/Jeløy
  - (Norway) Agnete Carlsen, Sprint/Jeløy
  - (Norway) Eva Gjelten, Trondheims-Ørn
- 10 goals:
  - (Norway) Trude Stendal, Sandviken
  - (Norway) Lena Haugen, Setskog/Høland
  - (Norway) Katrin Skarsbø, Sprint/Jeløy
- 9 goals:
  - (Norway) Birthe Hegstad, Klepp
  - (Norway) Turid Storhaug, Klepp
  - (Norway) Merete Ødegaard, Setskog/Høland

== Promotion and relegation ==
- BUL and Skedsmo were relegated to the 2. divisjon.
- Jardar and Spjelkavik were promoted from the 2. divisjon through playoff.
