= 1984 Norwegian First Division (women) =

1. divisjon (women)
- Season: 1984
- Champions: Sprint/Jeløy; 1st title
- Relegated: Radar; Vindbjart; Skjold; Samnanger; Nessegutten; Folldal; Fonna (withdrew)

The 1984 1. divisjon (women), was the first season of a top-tier women's football league in Norway, and was won by Sprint-Jeløy. The league was contested by 30 teams, divided in three groups of 10 teams.

In each group, the teams met each other twice in a round-robin, with 2 points given for wins, and 1 point for a draw. At the end of the season, the three group-winners met in a playoff to determine the championship, while the bottom two team from each group was relegated.

Sprint-Jeløy won the championship playoff, while Trondheims-Ørn finished second and Nymark finished third. At the end of the season, Radar, Skjold, Samnanger, Nessegutten and Folldal was relegated, in addition to Vindbjart and Fonna which didn't complete the season.

== League tables ==
=== Group Østlandet ===
| Pos | Team | Pld | W | D | L | GF | GA | GD | Pts | Qualification or relegation |
|---|---|---|---|---|---|---|---|---|---|---|
| 1 | Sprint-Jeløy (C) | 16 | 14 | 2 | 0 | 67 | 9 | +58 | 30 | Championship Play-off |
| 2 | Asker | 16 | 13 | 1 | 2 | 41 | 12 | +29 | 27 | |
| 3 | BUL | 16 | 11 | 3 | 2 | 44 | 14 | +30 | 25 | |
| 4 | Setskog | 16 | 10 | 1 | 5 | 42 | 23 | +19 | 21 | |
| 5 | Jardar | 16 | 6 | 2 | 8 | 28 | 32 | −4 | 14 | |
| 6 | Radar (R) | 16 | 4 | 2 | 10 | 11 | 40 | −29 | 10 | Relegated |
| 7 | Moelven | 16 | 4 | 1 | 11 | 16 | 55 | −39 | 9 | |
| 8 | Bøler | 16 | 3 | 2 | 11 | 10 | 25 | −15 | 8 | |
| 9 | Nybergsund | 16 | 0 | 0 | 16 | 6 | 53 | −47 | 0 | |
| 10 | Vindbjart (D) | 0 | 0 | 0 | 0 | 0 | 0 | 0 | 0 | Disqualified |

(C) Champions; (D) Disqualified; (R) Relegated

=== Group Vestlandet ===
| Pos | Team | Pld | W | D | L | GF | GA | GD | Pts | Qualification or relegation |
|---|---|---|---|---|---|---|---|---|---|---|
| 1 | Nymark | 16 | 14 | 1 | 1 | 70 | 7 | +63 | 29 | Championship Play-off |
| 2 | Sandviken | 16 | 12 | 2 | 2 | 66 | 10 | +56 | 26 | |
| 3 | Viking | 16 | 9 | 3 | 4 | 40 | 15 | +25 | 21 | |
| 4 | Haugar | 16 | 8 | 2 | 6 | 34 | 49 | −15 | 18 | |
| 5 | Vard | 16 | 5 | 5 | 6 | 22 | 28 | −6 | 15 | |
| 6 | Mathopen | 16 | 4 | 4 | 8 | 23 | 37 | −14 | 12 | |
| 7 | Fyllingen | 16 | 3 | 4 | 9 | 20 | 46 | −26 | 10 | |
| 8 | Skjold (R) | 16 | 3 | 3 | 10 | 14 | 52 | −38 | 9 | Relegated |
| 9 | Samnanger (R) | 16 | 0 | 4 | 12 | 17 | 62 | −45 | 4 | Relegated |
| 10 | Fonna (W) | 0 | 0 | 0 | 0 | 0 | 0 | 0 | 0 | Withdrew |

(R) Relegated; (W) Withdrew

=== Group Trøndelag ===
| Pos | Team | Pld | W | D | L | GF | GA | GD | Pts | Qualification or relegation |
|---|---|---|---|---|---|---|---|---|---|---|
| 1 | Trondheims-Ørn | 18 | 16 | 2 | 0 | 92 | 6 | +86 | 34 | Championship Play-off |
| 2 | Troll | 18 | 14 | 2 | 2 | 65 | 12 | +53 | 30 | |
| 3 | Verdal | 18 | 8 | 7 | 3 | 38 | 31 | +7 | 23 | |
| 4 | Sunndal | 18 | 8 | 4 | 6 | 50 | 30 | +20 | 20 | |
| 5 | Tolga | 18 | 5 | 7 | 6 | 15 | 27 | −12 | 17 | |
| 6 | Alvdal | 18 | 5 | 4 | 9 | 20 | 35 | −15 | 14 | |
| 7 | Namsos | 18 | 6 | 2 | 10 | 24 | 46 | −22 | 14 | |
| 8 | Heimdal | 18 | 5 | 3 | 10 | 22 | 52 | −30 | 13 | |
| 9 | Nessegutten (R) | 18 | 5 | 3 | 10 | 14 | 44 | −30 | 13 | Relegated |
| 10 | Folldal (R) | 18 | 1 | 0 | 17 | 7 | 64 | −57 | 2 | Relegated |

(R) Relegated

== Championship play-off ==
Nymark - Trondheims/Ørn 0-2
Sprint/Jeløy - Nymark 4-0
Trondheims/Ørn - Sprint/Jeløy 1-3

| Pos | Team | Pld | W | D | L | GF | GA | GD | Pts | Result |
|---|---|---|---|---|---|---|---|---|---|---|
| 1 | Sprint-Jeløy | 2 | 2 | 0 | 0 | 7 | 1 | +6 | 4 | Gold |
| 2 | Trondheims-Ørn | 2 | 1 | 0 | 1 | 3 | 3 | 0 | 2 | Silver |
| 3 | Nymark | 2 | 0 | 0 | 2 | 0 | 6 | −6 | 0 | Bronze |
