= 1988 Norwegian First Division (women) =

1. divisjon
- Season: 1988
- Champions: Asker; 1st title
- Relegated: Heimdal; BUL
- Matches: 90
- Top goalscorer: (Norway) Linda Medalen (22 goals)

The 1988 1. divisjon season, the highest women's football (soccer) league in Norway, began on 30 April 1988 and ended on 9 October 1988.

18 games were played with 3 points given for wins and 1 for draws. Number nine and ten were relegated, while two teams from the 2. divisjon were promoted through a playoff round.

Asker won the league, losing only one game.

== League table ==
Pos	Team	Pld	W	D	L	GF	GA	GD	Pts	Relegation
1	Asker (C)	18	16	1	1	70	18	+52	49	
2	Klepp	18	14	2	2	59	16	+43	44	
3	Trondheims-Ørn	18	11	2	5	33	20	+13	35	
4	Sprint/Jeløy	18	10	2	6	45	20	+25	32	
5	Setskog	18	7	3	8	32	28	+4	24	
6	Bøler	18	5	6	7	30	29	+1	21	
7	Jardar	18	6	1	11	29	42	−13	19	
8	Sandviken	18	4	4	10	20	42	−22	16	
9	Heimdal (R)	18	4	2	12	27	76	−49	14	Relegation to Second Division
10	BUL (R)	18	1	1	16	10	64	−54	4	Relegation to Second Division

(C) Champions; (R) Relegated

== Top goalscorers ==
- 22 goals:
  - (Norway) Linda Medalen, Asker
- 21 goals:
  - (Norway) Turid Storhaug, Klepp
- 16 goals:
  - (Norway) Sissel Grude, Klepp
  - (Norway) Lena Haugen, Setskog
- 15 goals:
  - (Norway) Ingunn Ramsfjell, Asker
- 14 goals:
  - (Norway) Gunn Nyborg, Asker
  - (Norway) Ellen Scheel, Jardar
- 10 goals:
  - (Norway) Ingvild Johansen, Sprint/Jeløy
- 9 goals:
  - (Norway) Britt Børve, Bøler
  - (Norway) Elisabeth Grindheim, Sprint/Jeløy
- 8 goals:
  - (Norway) Tina Svensson, Asker
  - (Norway) Marit Sigmond, Heimdal
  - (Norway) Linda Raade, Klepp
  - (Norway) Torill Hoch-Nielsen, Sprint/Jeløy
  - (Norway) Tone Haugen, Trondheims-Ørn

== Promotion and relegation ==
- Heimdal and BUL were relegated to the 2. divisjon.
- Skedsmo and Vard were promoted from the 2. divisjon through play-offs.
