= 1998 Toppserien =

Toppserien
- Season: 1998
- Champions: Asker; 5th title
- Relegated: Fløya; Byåsen
- Matches: 90
- Goals: 394 (4.38 per match)
- Top goalscorer: (Norway) Marianne Pettersen (36 goals)

The 1998 season of the Toppserien, the highest women's football (soccer) league in Norway, began on 25 April 1998 and ended on 17 October 1998.

18 games were played with 3 points given for wins and 1 for draws. Number nine and ten were relegated, while two teams from the First Division were promoted through a playoff round.

Asker won the league, as well as all its games.

== League table ==
Pos	Team	Pld	W	D	L	GF	GA	GD	Pts	Relegation
1	Asker (C)	18	18	0	0	79	14	+65	54	
2	Trondheims-Ørn	18	12	4	2	58	24	+34	40	
3	Athene Moss	18	9	3	6	47	34	+13	30	
4	Kolbotn	18	9	2	7	40	32	+8	29	
5	Sandviken	18	8	4	6	27	25	+2	28	
6	Klepp	18	8	3	7	36	31	+5	27	
7	Setskog/Høland	18	6	3	9	51	57	−6	21	
8	Bjørnar	18	5	5	8	31	38	−7	20	
9	Fløya (R)	18	1	3	14	14	72	−58	6	Relegation to First Division
10	Byåsen (R)	18	0	1	17	14	70	−56	1	Relegation to First Division

Source: nifs.no
(C) Champions; (R) Relegated

== Top goalscorers ==
- 36 goals:
  - (Norway) Marianne Pettersen, Asker
- 16 goals:
  - (Norway) Ragnhild Gulbrandsen, Trondheims-Ørn
  - (Norway) Hege Riise, Setskog/Høland
  - (Israel) Silvi Jan, Kolbotn
- 13 goals:
  - (Norway) Linda Ørmen, Athene Moss
  - (Norway) Anne Birgitte Nesset, Athene Moss
  - (Sweden) Christin Lilja, Athene Moss
  - (Norway) Dagny Mellgren, Klepp
- 12 goals:
  - (Norway) Elene Moseby, Setskog/Høland
- 10 goals:
  - (Norway) Ann Kristin Aarønes, Trondheims-Ørn
- 9 goals:
  - (Norway) Ann Elisabeth Kallevik, Setskog/Høland
  - (Norway) Ingrid Camilla Fosse Sæthre, Bjørnar
  - (Norway) Monica Knudsen, Asker

== Promotion and relegation ==
- Fløya and Byåsen were relegated to the First Division.
- Grand Bodø and Kaupanger were promoted from the First Division through playoff.
