= 1995 Norwegian First Division (women) =

1. divisjon
- Season: 1995
- Teams: 10
- Champions: Trondheims-Ørn; 2nd title
- Relegated: Donn; Grand Bodø
- Matches: 90
- Goals: 370 (4.11 per match)
- Top goalscorer: (Norway) Randi Leinan (31 goals)

The 1995 1. divisjon, the highest women's football (soccer) league in Norway, began on 22 April 1995 and ended on 14 October 1995.

18 games were played with 3 points given for wins and 1 for draws. Number nine and ten were relegated, while two teams from the 2. divisjon were promoted through a playoff round. For the next season, the league was renamed Eliteserien.

Trondheims-Ørn won the league, losing only one game.

== League table ==
Pos	Team	Pld	W	D	L	GF	GA	GD	Pts	Relegation
1	Trondheims-Ørn (C)	18	15	2	1	74	14	+60	47	
2	Setskog/Høland	18	13	1	4	62	30	+32	40	
3	Sandviken	18	10	4	4	45	24	+21	34	
4	Asker	18	10	1	7	45	30	+15	31	
5	Sprint/Jeløy	18	8	2	8	28	32	−4	26	
6	Kolbotn	18	7	3	8	31	42	−11	24	
7	Haugar	18	7	0	11	28	40	−12	21	
8	Klepp	18	5	3	10	23	37	−14	18	
9	Donn (R)	18	4	3	11	15	54	−39	15	Relegation to Second Division
10	Grand Bodø (R)	18	1	1	16	19	67	−48	4	Relegation to Second Division

(C) Champions; (R) Relegated

== Top goalscorers ==
- 31 goals:
  - (Norway) Randi Leinan, Trondheims-Ørn
- 23 goals:
  - (Norway) Ann Kristin Aarønes, Trondheims-Ørn
- 17 goals:
  - (Norway) Åse Iren Steine, Sandviken
- 16 goals:
  - (Norway) Hege Riise, Setskog/Høland
- 11 goals:
  - (Norway) Kjersti Thun, Asker
- 10 goals:
  - (Norway) Kariann Røgenes, Klepp
  - (Norway) Lene Inngjerdingen, Setskog/Høland
- 9 goals:
  - (Norway) Hilde Dvergsdal, Asker
  - (Norway) Heidi Eivik, Grand Bodø

== Promotion and relegation ==
- Donn and Grand Bodø were relegated to the 2. divisjon.
- Bøler and Gjelleråsen were promoted from the 2. divisjon through play-offs.
