= 1996 Toppserien =

Toppserien
- Season: 1996
- Champions: Trondheims-Ørn; 3rd title
- Relegated: Haugar; Gjelleråsen
- Matches: 90
- Goals: 364 (4.04 per match)
- Top goalscorer: (Norway) Randi Leinan (27 goals)

The 1996 season of the Toppserien, the highest women's football (soccer) league in Norway, began on 21 April 1996 and ended on 13 October 1996.

18 games were played with 3 points given for wins and 1 for draws. Number nine and ten were relegated, while two teams from the First Division were promoted through a playoff round. After the season had ended, Sprint/Jeløy changed its name to Athene Moss.

Trondheims-Ørn won the league, losing only one game.

== League table ==
Pos	Team	Pld	W	D	L	GF	GA	GD	Pts	Relegation
1	Trondheims-Ørn (C)	18	16	1	1	85	20	+65	49	
2	Sandviken	18	12	2	4	43	19	+24	38	
3	Asker	18	10	1	7	41	27	+14	31	
4	Kolbotn	18	8	4	6	41	40	+1	28	
5	Klepp	18	7	6	5	30	31	−1	27	
6	Sprint/Jeløy	18	6	5	7	26	31	−5	23	
7	Bøler	18	4	5	9	23	42	−19	17	
8	Setskog/Høland	18	5	2	11	35	57	−22	17	
9	Haugar (R)	18	4	4	10	18	36	−18	16	Relegation to First Division
10	Gjelleråsen (R)	18	0	6	12	22	61	−39	6	Relegation to First Division

(C) Champions; (R) Relegated

== Top goalscorers ==
- 27 goals:
  - (Norway) Randi Leinan, Trondheims-Ørn
- 12 goals:
  - (Norway) Marianne Pettersen, Gjelleråsen
  - (Israel) Silvi Jan, Kolbotn
  - (Norway) Åse Iren Steine, Sandviken
- 11 goals:
  - (Norway) Anne Nymark Andersen, Sandviken
- 10 goals:
  - (Norway) Hege Gunnerød, Asker
  - (Norway) Kjersti Thun, Asker
  - (Norway) Britt Monica Andreassen, Bøler
  - (Norway) Unni Lehn, Trondheims-Ørn
- 9 goals:
  - (Norway) Heidi Eivik, Trondheims-Ørn
  - (Norway) Brit Sandaune, Trondheims-Ørn
- 8 goals:
  - (Norway) Katrin Skarsbø, Sprint/Jeløy

== Promotion and relegation ==
- Haugar and Gjelleråsen were relegated to the 1. divisjon.
- Verdal and Bjørnar were promoted from the 1. divisjon through play-offs.
