= 1994 Norwegian First Division (women) =

1. divisjon
- Season: 1994
- Champions: Trondheims-Ørn; 1st title
- Relegated: Fløya; Molde
- Matches: 90
- Goals: 365 (4.06 per match)
- Top goalscorer: (Norway) Kristin Sandberg (24 goals)

The 1994 1. divisjon, the highest women's football (soccer) league in Norway, began on 24 April 1994 and ended on 9 October 1994.

18 games were played with 3 points given for wins and 1 for draws. Number nine and ten were relegated, while two teams from the 2. divisjon were promoted through a playoff round.

Trondheims-Ørn won the league, losing only one game.

== League table ==
Pos	Team	Pld	W	D	L	GF	GA	GD	Pts	Relegation
1	Trondheims-Ørn (C)	18	16	1	1	83	21	+62	49	
2	Asker	18	15	0	3	52	18	+34	45	
3	Sprint/Jeløy	18	11	4	3	51	29	+22	37	
4	Donn	18	10	3	5	37	24	+13	33	
5	Sandviken	18	7	4	7	38	27	+11	25	
6	Setskog/Høland	18	7	4	7	33	40	−7	25	
7	Klepp	18	5	1	12	22	45	−23	16	
8	Haugar	18	3	4	11	24	48	−24	13	
9	Fløya (R)	18	4	0	14	14	51	−37	12	Relegation to Second Division
10	Molde (R)	18	1	1	16	19	67	−48	4	Relegation to Second Division

(C) Champions; (R) Relegated

== Top goalscorers ==
- 24 goals:
  - (Norway) Kristin Sandberg, Asker
- 18 goals:
  - (Norway) Randi Leinan, Trondheims-Ørn
- 17 goals:
  - (Norway) Ann Kristin Aarønes, Trondheims-Ørn
- 16 goals:
  - (Norway) Katrin Skarsbø, Sprint/Jeløy
- 14 goals:
  - (Norway) Elisabeth Brenne, Donn
  - (Norway) Brit Sandaune, Trondheims-Ørn
- 13 goals:
  - (Norway) Agnete Carlsen, Sprint/Jeløy
- 11 goals:
  - (Norway) Merete Myklebust, Trondheims-Ørn
- 10 goals:
  - (Norway) Hege Riise, Setskog/Høland
  - (Norway) Monica Enlid, Trondheims-Ørn
- 9 goals:
  - (Norway) Åse Iren Steine, Sandviken
  - (Norway) Anita Waage, Trondheims-Ørn

== Promotion and relegation ==
- Fløya and Molde were relegated to the 2. divisjon.
- Grand Bodø and Kolbotn were promoted from the 2. divisjon through playoff.
