= 1999 Toppserien =

Toppserien
- Season: 1999
- Champions: Asker; 6th title
- Relegated: Kaupanger; Sandviken
- Matches: 90
- Goals: 430 (4.78 per match)
- Top goalscorer: (Norway) Kjersti Thun (23 goals)

The 1999 season of the Toppserien, the highest women's football (soccer) league in Norway, began on 24 April 1999 and ended on 16 October 1999.

18 games were played with 3 points given for wins and 1 for draws. Number nine and ten were relegated, while two teams from the First Division were promoted through a playoff round.

Asker won the league.

== League table ==
| Pos | Team | Pld | W | D | L | GF | GA | GD | Pts | Relegation |
|---|---|---|---|---|---|---|---|---|---|---|
| 1 | Asker (C) | 18 | 14 | 2 | 2 | 80 | 14 | +66 | 44 | |
| 2 | Trondheims-Ørn | 18 | 12 | 4 | 2 | 85 | 19 | +66 | 40 | |
| 3 | Klepp | 18 | 12 | 3 | 3 | 47 | 18 | +29 | 39 | |
| 4 | Kolbotn | 18 | 10 | 3 | 5 | 53 | 24 | +29 | 33 | |
| 5 | Bjørnar | 18 | 9 | 2 | 7 | 34 | 32 | +2 | 29 | |
| 6 | Setskog/Høland | 18 | 8 | 3 | 7 | 37 | 48 | −11 | 27 | |
| 7 | Athene Moss | 18 | 7 | 2 | 9 | 46 | 46 | 0 | 23 | |
| 8 | Grand Bodø | 18 | 4 | 3 | 11 | 24 | 70 | −46 | 15 | |
| 9 | Sandviken (R) | 18 | 2 | 1 | 15 | 19 | 65 | −46 | 7 | Relegation to First Division |
| 10 | Kaupanger (R) | 18 | 0 | 1 | 17 | 5 | 94 | −89 | 1 | Relegation to First Division |

Source: nifs.no
(C) Champions; (R) Relegated

== Top goalscorers ==
- 23 goals:
  - (Norway) Kjersti Thun, Asker
- 19 goals:
  - (Sweden) Christin Lilja, Athene Moss
- 16 goals:
  - (Norway) Marianne Pettersen, Asker
  - (Norway) Ingrid Camilla Fosse Sæthre, Bjørnar
  - (Norway) Line Anzjøn, Klepp
- 15 goals:
  - (Norway) Solveig Gulbrandsen, Kolbotn
  - (Norway) Ragnhild Gulbrandsen, Trondheims-Ørn
  - (Norway) Ann Kristin Aarønes, Trondheims-Ørn
- 13 goals:
  - (Norway) Brit Sandaune, Trondheims-Ørn
- 11 goals:
  - (Norway) Linda Medalen, Asker
  - (Norway) Tonje Hansen, Kolbotn
  - (Norway) Elene Moseby, Setskog/Høland
  - (Norway) Trine Rønning, Trondheims-Ørn

== Promotion and relegation ==
- Sandviken and Kaupanger were relegated to the First Division.
- Byåsen and Larvik were promoted from the First Division through playoff.
