= Line Anzjøn =

Norwegian footballer (born 1975)

Personal information
- Date of birth: 1975 (age 50–51)
- Position: Striker

Youth career
- Namdalseid
- Namsos

Senior career*
Years	Team	Apps	(Gls)
1992–1993	Spillum		
1994–1995	Verdal		
1996	Donn		
1997–1998	Verdal		
1999–2001	Klepp		
2002	Austrått		
2003–2004	Nærbø		
2005	Sola		

International career
1995	Norway U20	2	(0)
- * Club domestic league appearances and goals

Line Anzjøn (born 1975) is a Norwegian footballer who played as a striker. She was a contender for the top goalscorer title in Toppserien twice; in 1997 with Verdal IL and 1999 with Klepp IL.

== Career ==
She hails from Sjøåsen in Namdalseid. She played for Namdalseid and Namsos IL before playing senior football for Spillum in the Third Division, as Namsos had no senior team. She took vocational training as a welder at Nauma Upper Secondary School.

In 1994 she moved to Verdal IL. She quickly made her mark by scoring 8 goals against Bossmo og Ytteren in the first round of the cup. She had offers from other clubs to move to a higher level, but by November 1994, she had more or less decided to stay in Verdal. She was also called up to Norway U20 in 1995. Her goalscoring form continued during this season. Among others, she scored 7 goals in a match against Os/Nansen.

Sought-after by several clubs, Anzjøn chose to move to Kristiansand and sign for FK Donn. According to Fædrelandsvennen, Anzjøn recorded 25 goals in 21 matches for Donn. She was also used as an overage player for the U20 team in the Norway Cup, where she among others scored 12 goals in one match, beating her own personal record of 8 goals. Donn lost out in the playoff for Toppserien, however. She was again wanted by several clubs, and chose to return to Verdal IL, who had won promotion to the 1997 Toppserien.

In 1994, 1995 and 1996 she turned down offers from Trondheims-Ørn. The main reason was her need to hold a job outside of football; while at Verdal she worked at Aker Verdal and did not want to commute to Trondheim. In 1997, as Verdal was swiftly relegated from the Toppserien, Anzjøn voiced her willingness to join the reigning champions from Trondheim. With 14 goals, Anzjøn came fourth in the top goalscorer table, only behind Ragnhild Gulbrandsen, Ann Kristin Aarønes and Marianne Pettersen. In the end she stayed in Verdal in an attempt to win re-promotion.

During the 1998 First Division season, she was again a prolific scorer, among others with 5 goals against Os/Nansen. Verdal reached the playoff, but despite her scoring in the playoff against FK Larvik, Verdal lost 5–4. Anzjøn then left Verdal for the second time, deciding to sign for the Toppserien club Klepp IL. The team needed a replacement for Dagny Mellgren, and secured Anzjøn a job as an industrial welder.

In the 1999 Toppserien, Anzjøn ended in 16 goals, which put her fifth in the top goalscoring table. She was awarded a Comet of the Year (meaning newcomer of the year) title, winning a vote ahead of Trine Rønning and Solveig Gulbrandsen. The Football Association-affiliated magazine Bladet Fotball commented that Anzjøn was "probably not far away from a call-up" to the national team.

After Norway won the 2000 Summer Olympics, Anzjøn lamented that the international success did not translate to higher viewership in the domestic league. However, she thought people were in the right to not attend women's games: "I understand very well that people don't bother watching women's football. It is so boring", she told Namdalsavisa. Her own 2000 season became less successful as Anzjøn needed knee surgery. Her 2001 season was also marred by injuries. First, she played two matches in April, but during these she sustained blows to both her knees. After a period on the sidelines, she returned, only to be injured again. By the summer of 2001, she contemplated retirement.

Between 2002 and 2004, Anzjøn wound down her career with minnow teams Austrått IL and Nærbø IL. (Note: Line Anzjøn at the Norwegian Football Federation (in Norwegian)) In 2005, Klepp would try to persuade Anzjøn and Jørgensen to make a comeback. Instead they both joined Sola FK. Sola subsequently cruised through the Third Division. Among others, Anzjøn scored 7 goals against Hinna and 9 goals against Frøyland.

== Personal life ==
Line Anzjøn married her former teammate Silje Jørgensen. Their son Teo Jørgensen Anzjøn was a local talent in both football and handball.
