= Norwegian First Division (women) =

- Founded: 1984; 42 years ago 1984–1995 (as 2. divisjon); 1996–2026 (as 1. divisjon); 2026–present (as COOP-ligaen)
- Country: Norway
- Confederation: UEFA
- Number of clubs: 12
- Level on pyramid: 2
- Promotion to: Toppserien
- Relegation to: Norwegian Second Division
- Domestic cup: Norwegian Cup
- Current champions: Start (2026)
- Most championships: Sandviken (5)
- Broadcaster: TV 2
- Website: toppserien.no
- Current: 2026 Norwegian First Division (women)

The Norwegian First Division, also called 1. divisjon (Norwegian: 1. divisjon) and COOP-ligaen (due to sponsoring ties with COOP), is the second highest division in women's football in Norway. It was founded in 1984. Between 1984 and 1995 it served as the first tier. 1. divisjon was replaced as a first tier by the Eliteserien which in turn was replaced by the Toppserien in 2000. It continued as a second tier from 1996 and onwards.

== First tier ==
Between 1977 and 1983 women's league football in Norway was organized on a county and regional basis. In 1984, three of these leagues, those representing Østlandet, Vestlandet and Trøndelag, merged to form the first national league. However, during the earliest seasons teams continued to play in three regional groups, each with ten teams, and the national title was decided by a play-off between the three group winners. In 1986, a fourth group representing Nord-Norge was added, and the number of teams in the league increased to forty. The league system was subsequently reorganized for the 1987 season. At the end of the 1986 season, thirty of the teams were relegated and formed into a 2. divisjon. The remaining ten teams formed a single nationwide 1. divisjon. The new 1. divisjon remained the top tier of Norwegian women's football until 1995.

=== List of champions (1984–1995) ===
Year	Champions	Runners-up	Third place
1984	Sprint-Jeløy	Trondheims-Ørn	Nymark
1985	Nymark	Asker	Trondheims-Ørn
1986	Sprint-Jeløy	Troll	Klepp; Grand
1987	Klepp	Sprint-Jeløy	Asker
1988	Asker	Klepp	Trondheims-Ørn
1989	Asker	Sprint-Jeløy	Klepp
1990	Sprint-Jeløy	Asker	Klepp
1991	Asker	Sprint-Jeløy	Sandviken
1992	Asker	Setskog/Høland	Sprint-Jeløy
1993	Sprint-Jeløy	Trondheims-Ørn	Asker
1994	Trondheims-Ørn	Asker	Sprint-Jeløy
1995	Trondheims-Ørn	Setskog/Høland	Sandviken

== Second tier ==
With the establishment of the Eliteserien in 1996 the 1. divisjon became a second tier division. At the same time the original 2. divisjon formed in 1987 became the third tier. The 1. divisjon now featured 58 teams in six regional groups. For the 2001 season the 1. divisjon was greatly reduced in size and it once again became single nationwide division. It initially featured nine teams, gradually adding a tenth before expanding to twelve for the 2009 season. All nineteen counties of Norway have been represented in the nationwide 1. divisjon since 2001; Østfold was the last county to be represented, when Sarpsborg 08 got promoted in 2010.

=== Regional format ===
Season	Promoted	Qualification	System
1996	Bjørnar; Verdal	Donn, Fløya; Raufoss/Vind, Bergen Nord	58 teams in 6 pools Play-off: 2 groups á 3 teams
1997	Byåsen; Fløya	Haugar, Jardar; Kaupanger, Larvik	55 teams in 6 pools Play-off: 2 groups á 3 teams
1998	Grand Bodø; Kaupanger	Liungen, Solid; Larvik, Verdal	55 teams in 6 pools Play-off: 2 groups á 3 teams
1999	Byåsen; Larvik	Medkila, Voss; Haugar, Liungen	55 teams in 6 pools Play-off: 2 groups á 3 teams
2000	Liungen; Røa	Fløya, Fortuna Ålesund; Follese, Haugar	57 teams in 6 pools Play-off: 2 groups á 3 teams

=== Single Division Format ===
Season	Winner	Promoted	Notes
2001	Sandviken	Larvik	Grand Bodø withdrew, only 9 teams finished the season.
2002	Liungen	Fløya	Athene Moss withdrew, only 9 teams finished the season.
2003	Sandviken	Medkila	
2004	Kattem	Liungen	
2005	Arna-Bjørnar	Amazon Grimstad	
2006	Asker	Kattem, Grand Bodø	Toppserien expanded to 12 teams, 3rd and 4th place in the 1. divisjon played promotion matches against the bottom two teams in Toppserien.
2007	Fart	Larvik	
2008	Sandviken	Fortuna Ålesund	1. divisjon expanded to 12 teams, the bottom two teams in the 1. divisjon played relegation matches against the winners of the 2. divisjon.
2009	Linderud-Grei	Donn	
2010	Sandviken	Medkila	
2011	Vålerenga	Fart	
2012	Avaldsnes	Medkila	Medkila lost the promotion-playoff against Kattem, but were still promoted when Kattem withdrew their team.
2013	Grand Bodø	—	
2014	Sandviken	—	
2015	Urædd	—	
2016	Grand Bodø	—	
2017	Lyn	—	
2018	Fart	—	
2019	Fløya	—	No teams promoted due to number of Toppserien teams reduced from 12 to 10.
2020	Stabæk	—	Medkila lost the promotion-playoff against Kolbotn.
2021	Røa	—	
