= 1987 Norwegian First Division (women) =

1. divisjon
- Season: 1987
- Champions: Klepp; 1st title
- Relegated: Troll; Grand
- Matches: 90
- Top goalscorer: (Norway) Lisbeth Bakken (14 goals)

The 1987 1. divisjon, the highest women's football (soccer) league in Norway, began on 2 May 1987 and ended on 3 October 1987.

It was the first season with a single, nationwide league for women.

18 games were played with 3 points given for wins, whereas drawn matches were decided with a penalty shootout, with 2 points for a shootout victory and 1 point for a shootout loss.

Number nine and ten were relegated, while two teams from the 2. divisjon were promoted through a playoff round.

Klepp won the league, having taken the lead as late as the seventeenth round.

== League table ==
Pos	Team	Pld	W	PKW	PKL	L	GF	GA	GD	Pts	Relegation
1	Klepp (C)	18	11	3	0	4	44	23	+21	39	
2	Sprint/Jeløy	18	10	2	2	4	42	16	+26	36	
3	Asker	18	8	3	2	5	38	32	+6	32	
4	Sandviken	18	9	2	0	7	34	24	+10	31	
5	Bøler	18	8	2	2	6	30	22	+8	30	
6	Trondheims-Ørn	18	8	2	2	6	17	20	−3	30	
7	Setskog	18	7	0	4	7	25	35	−10	25	
8	BUL	18	6	1	1	10	24	29	−5	21	
9	Troll (R)	18	2	2	3	11	17	33	−16	13	Relegation to Second Division
10	Grand (R)	18	4	0	1	13	17	54	−37	13	Relegation to Second Division

(C) Champion; (R) Relegated

== Top goalscorers ==
- 14 goals:
  - (Norway) Lisbeth Bakken, Sprint/Jeløy
- 13 goals:
  - (Norway) Elisabeth Grindheim, Sandviken
- 12 goals:
  - (Norway) Sissel Grude, Klepp
  - (Norway) Turid Storhaug, Klepp
- 11 goals:
  - (Norway) Inger Knuten, Asker
- 10 goals:
  - (Norway) Trude Stendal, Sandviken
- 9 goals:
  - (Norway) Kari Nielsen, Asker
  - (Norway) Laila Rognhaug, Bøler
  - (Norway) Mai-Heidi Aas, Grand
- 7 goals:
  - (Norway) Sissel Grude, Klepp
  - (Norway) Kristin Henriksen, Sprint/Jeløy
  - (Norway) Torill Hoch-Nielsen, Sprint/Jeløy

== Promotion and relegation ==
- Troll and Grand were relegated to the Second Division.
- Jardar and Heimdal were promoted from the Second Division through playoff.
