= 2019 Norwegian First Division (women) =

1. divisjon
- Season: 2019
- Champions: Fløya
- Relegated: Grand Bodø; Byåsen; Kaupanger; Nanset; Snøgg
- Matches: 132
- Goals: 461 (3.49 per match)
- Top goalscorer: Celine Emilie Nergård (22 goals)

The 2019 1. divisjon is the second tier of Norwegian women's football in 2019. The season kicked off on 13 April 2019 and is scheduled to finish on 3 November 2019.

Due to a reduction of teams from 12 to 10 teams in both the first and the second tier, the top placed team will have to play promotion play-offs against the tenth-placed team in Toppserien to win promotion. Four teams are relegated directly to the 2. divisjon. The eighth-placed teams play relegation play-offs against a team from 2. divisjon.

== League table ==
Pos	Team	Pld	W	D	L	GF	GA	GD	Pts	Promotion, qualification or relegation
1	Fløya (C)	22	15	2	5	62	30	+32	47	Qualification for the promotion play-offs
2	Hønefoss	22	14	3	5	47	23	+24	45	
3	Øvrevoll Hosle	22	13	4	5	55	26	+29	43	
4	Medkila	22	12	5	5	37	33	+4	41	
5	Amazon Grimstad	22	11	1	10	51	36	+15	34	
6	Grei	22	9	6	7	46	40	+6	33	
7	Åsane	22	9	5	8	38	33	+5	32	
8	Grand Bodø (R)	22	8	3	11	34	45	−11	27	Qualification for the relegation play-offs
9	Byåsen (R)	22	7	5	10	39	55	−16	26	Relegation to Second Division
10	Kaupanger (R)	22	4	6	12	13	41	−28	18	Relegation to Second Division
11	Nanset (R)	22	5	1	16	21	52	−31	16	Relegation to Second Division
12	Snøgg (R)	22	2	5	15	18	47	−29	11	Relegation to Second Division

Source: nifs.no
Rules for classification: 1) Points; 2) Goal difference; 3) Goals scored; 4) Head-to-head points; 5) Head-to-head goal difference; 6) Head-to-head away goals scored (only if between two teams); 7) Head-to-head goals scored; 8) Play-off (only used to decide champions or relegation).
(C) Champions; (R) Relegated

== Promotion play-offs ==
The promotion play-offs will this season be contested by the 10th placed team in Toppserien, Lyn, and the winner of the 1. divisjon, IF Fløya.

24 November 2019
16:00 CET (UTC+1)

Fløya	0–5	Lyn
	Report	Linberg 22'; Godø 39'; Lillegård 51', 59'; Eckhoff 85'

Bardufoss storhall, Bardufoss
Attendance: 350
Referee: Marit Buhaug Folstad (Buvik)
1 December 2019
12:00 CET (UTC+1)

Lyn	2–1	Fløya
Hasund 29'; Huseby 66'	Report	Simonsen 50'

Kringsjå kunstgress, Oslo
Attendance: 157
Referee: Sarah Fatemeh Zangeneh (Nordstrand)

Lyn won 7–1 on aggregate.

== Relegation play-offs ==
The relegation play-offs will this season be contested by the 8th placed team in 1. divisjon, Grand Bodø, and the winner of the 2. divisjon, KIL/Hemne.

17 November 2019
14:00 CET (UTC+1)

Grand Bodø	3–2	KIL/Hemne
Falch 8', 82'; Lillegård 15'	Report	Smevoll 10'; Eide 71'

Nordlandshallen, Bodø
Attendance: 507
Referee: Henrik Gagnum (Tverlandet)
23 November 2019
19:00 CET (UTC+1)

KIL/Hemne	3–1	Grand Bodø
Bjerksæter 22'; Johansen 37'; Smevoll 55'	Report	Holmstrøm 12'

Sodvinhallen, Kyrksæterøra
Attendance: 600
Referee: Oliver Skaret Barsøe (Namsos)

KIL/Hemne won 5–4 on aggregate.
