= 1993 Norwegian First Division (women) =

1. divisjon
- Season: 1993
- Champions: Sprint-Jeløy; 4th title
- Relegated: Grand Bodø; Jardar
- Matches: 90
- Top goalscorer: (Norway) Randi Leinan (26 goals)

The 1993 1. divisjon season, the highest women's football (soccer) league in Norway, began on 24 April 1993 and ended on 10 October 1993.

18 games were played with 3 points given for wins and 1 for draws. Number nine and ten were relegated, while two teams from the 2. divisjon were promoted through a playoff round.

Sprint/Jeløy won the league, losing only one game.

== League table ==
Pos	Team	Pld	W	D	L	GF	GA	GD	Pts	Relegation
1	Sprint/Jeløy (C)	18	15	2	1	69	22	+47	47	
2	Trondheims-Ørn	18	12	2	4	78	22	+56	38	
3	Asker	18	11	1	6	41	27	+14	34	
4	Donn	18	10	2	6	37	40	−3	32	
5	Sandviken	18	10	1	7	41	31	+10	31	
6	Setskog/Høland	18	7	2	9	36	36	0	23	
7	Klepp	18	6	1	11	28	55	−27	19	
8	Fløya	18	6	0	12	15	33	−18	18	
9	Grand Bodø (R)	18	4	4	10	23	52	−29	16	Relegation to Second Division
10	Jardar (R)	18	1	1	16	13	63	−50	4	Relegation to Second Division

(C) Champions; (R) Relegated

== Top goalscorers ==
- 26 goals:
  - (Norway) Randi Leinan, Trondheims-Ørn
- 18 goals:
  - (Norway) Ann Kristin Aarønes, Trondheims-Ørn
- 17 goals:
  - (Canada) Charmaine Hooper, Donn
- 14 goals:
  - (Norway) Birthe Hegstad, Sprint/Jeløy
- 12 goals:
  - (Germany) Petra Bartelmann, Asker
- 11 goals:
  - (Norway) Agnete Carlsen, Sprint/Jeløy
  - (Norway) Katrin Skarsbø, Sprint/Jeløy
- 8 goals:
  - (Norway) Linda Medalen, Asker
  - (Norway) Åse Iren Steine, Sandviken
  - (Norway) Renate Walle, Sandviken
- 7 goals:
  - (Norway) Gøril Kringen, Trondheims-Ørn

== Promotion and relegation ==
- Grand Bodø and Jardar were relegated to the 2. divisjon.
- Haugar and Molde were promoted from the 2. divisjon through playoff.
