= 1997 Toppserien =

Toppserien
- Season: 1997
- Champions: Trondheims-Ørn; 4th title
- Relegated: Bøler; Verdal
- Matches: 90
- Goals: 384 (4.27 per match)
- Top goalscorer: (Norway) Ragnhild Gulbrandsen (24 goals)

The 1997 season of the Toppserien, the highest women's football (soccer) league in Norway, began on 26 April 1997 and ended on 11 October 1997.

18 games were played with 3 points given for wins and 1 for draws. Number nine and ten were relegated, while two teams from the First Division were promoted through a playoff round.

Trondheims/Ørn won the league, losing only one game.

== League table ==
Pos	Team	Pld	W	D	L	GF	GA	GD	Pts	Relegation
1	Trondheims-Ørn (C)	18	16	1	1	81	26	+55	49	
2	Asker	18	11	4	3	48	23	+25	37	
3	Klepp	18	10	3	5	33	23	+10	33	
4	Kolbotn	18	9	5	4	46	21	+25	32	
5	Sandviken	18	7	5	6	34	26	+8	26	
6	Bjørnar	18	7	5	6	30	25	+5	26	
7	Setskog/Høland	18	7	2	9	39	36	+3	23	
8	Athene Moss	18	6	1	11	33	38	−5	19	
9	Bøler (R)	18	2	2	14	15	78	−63	8	Relegation to First Division
10	Verdal (R)	18	1	0	17	25	88	−63	3	Relegation to First Division

(C) Champions; (R) Relegated

== Top goalscorers ==
- 24 goals:
  - (Norway) Ragnhild Gulbrandsen, Trondheims-Ørn
- 20 goals:
  - (Norway) Ann Kristin Aarønes, Trondheims-Ørn
- 19 goals:
  - (Norway) Marianne Pettersen, Asker
- 14 goals:
  - (Norway) Line Anzjøn, Verdal
- 13 goals:
  - (Norway) Randi Leinan, Kolbotn
- 10 goals:
  - (Norway) Dagny Mellgren, Klepp
- 9 goals:
  - (Norway) Margunn Haugenes, Bjørnar
  - (Israel) Silvi Jan, Kolbotn
  - (Norway) Monica Enlid, Trondheims-Ørn
- 8 goals:
  - (Norway) Nina Reiersen, Athene Moss
  - (Norway) Gro Espeseth, Sandviken
  - (Norway) Brit Sandaune, Trondheims-Ørn

== Promotion and relegation ==
- Bøler and Verdal were relegated to the First Division.
- Fløya and Byåsen were promoted from the First Division through playoff.
