= 2016 Norwegian First Division (women) =

1. divisjon
- Season: 2016
- Champions: Grand Bodø
- Promoted: Grand Bodø
- Relegated: Fortuna Ålesund; Raufoss
- Matches played: 132
- Goals scored: 484 (3.67 per match)
- Average attendance: 101

The 2016 1. divisjon was the second tier of Norwegian women's football in 2016. The season kicked off on 16 April 2016, finishing on 6 November 2016.

The top placed team was promoted to next year's Toppserien. The second placed team contested a playoff against the 11th placed team from the 2016 Toppserien for the right to play in Toppserien next season.

== Table ==
1. Grand Bodø − promoted
2. Lyn
3. Byåsen
4. Fløya
5. Øvrevoll Hosle
6. Grei
7. Kongsvinger
8. Åsane
9. Fart
10. Amazon Grimstad
11. Fortuna Ålesund − relegated
12. Raufoss − relegated
