= 2022 Norwegian First Division (women) =

Norwegian women's football season

Norwegian First Division
- Season: 2022
- Champions: TIL 2020
- Promoted: Åsane
- Relegated: Amazon Grimstad; Medkila
- Matches: 90
- Goals: 289 (3.21 per match)
- Top goalscorer: Katarina Dybvik Sunde (14 goals)
- Biggest home win: TIL 2020 6–0 Medkila (19 March 2022)
- Biggest away win: Medkila 0–6 TIL 2020 (28 August 2022)
- Highest scoring: AaFK Fortuna 5–4 Klepp (7 August 2022)

The 2022 Norwegian First Division was the 38th season of the Norwegian First Division, the second-tier Norwegian women's football division, and the 21st season under the current format. The league consists of 10 teams. The season started on 19 March 2022.

== Format ==
This season is the first with a new play-off system. It was set to be introduced in the 2020 season, but it was postponed due to the COVID-19 pandemic.

== Teams ==
Locations of teams in the 2022 First Division.

The following ten teams compete in the 2022 First Division:

Club	Municipality	Ground
AaFK Fortuna	Ålesund Municipality	Color Line Stadion
Amazon Grimstad	Grimstad Municipality	Levermyr Stadion
Grand Bodø	Bodø Municipality	Nordlandshallen
Hønefoss	Ringerike Municipality	Aka Arena
KIL/Hemne	Heim Municipality	Hemne Sparebank Arena
Klepp	Klepp Municipality	Klepp Stadion
Medkila	Harstad Municipality	Harstad Stadion
TIL 2020 (Note: TIL 2020 have changed their name from Fløya.)	Tromsø Municipality	Alfheim Stadion
Øvrevoll Hosle	Bærum Municipality	Ferd Arena Hosle
Åsane	Bergen Municipality	Åsane Arena

== Regular season ==
The regular season consists of 10 teams, who will play each other twice, totalling 18 matches per team. The top two teams qualify for the Toppserien play-offs. The other eight teams qualify for the First Division play-offs.

Pos	Team	Pld	W	D	L	GF	GA	GD	Pts	Qualification
1	TIL 2020	18	12	3	3	40	13	+27	39	Qualification for the Toppserien play-offs
2	Åsane	18	12	3	3	32	8	+24	39	Qualification for the Toppserien play-offs
3	Øvrevoll Hosle	18	12	0	6	36	23	+13	36	Qualification for the First Division play-offs
4	KIL/Hemne	18	8	5	5	22	23	−1	29	Qualification for the First Division play-offs
5	Hønefoss	18	8	3	7	36	32	+4	27	Qualification for the First Division play-offs
6	AaFK Fortuna	18	8	1	9	33	34	−1	25	Qualification for the First Division play-offs
7	Klepp	18	6	2	10	31	36	−5	20	Qualification for the First Division play-offs
8	Grand Bodø	18	4	6	8	26	36	−10	18	Qualification for the First Division play-offs
9	Amazon Grimstad	18	4	2	12	19	32	−13	14	Qualification for the First Division play-offs
10	Medkila	18	3	1	14	14	52	−38	10	Qualification for the First Division play-offs

Source: NIFS (in Norwegian)
Rules for classification: 1) Points; 2) Goal difference; 3) Goals scored; 4) Head-to-head points; 5) Head-to-head goal difference; 6) Head-to-head goals scored.

=== Results ===
Home \ Away	AFK	AMA	GRA	HØN	KIL	KLE	MED	TIL	ØVH	ÅSA
AaFK Fortuna	—	1–0	2–0	4–0	2–2	5–4	6–1	0–2	1–2	0–4
Amazon Grimstad	1–0	—	2–2	3–2	1–2	2–4	3–0	2–1	1–4	1–2
Grand Bodø	1–2	0–0	—	4–1	2–2	3–0	4–1	2–2	0–2	1–0
Hønefoss	3–1	2–0	3–1	—	5–1	3–2	5–0	1–4	2–1	2–2
KIL/Hemne	1–0	2–1	1–1	2–2	—	0–1	1–0	1–4	1–0	0–0
Klepp	2–4	3–1	4–1	2–2	0–2	—	4–0	0–1	0–3	0–3
Medkila	4–2	3–1	2–2	1–2	0–1	0–3	—	0–6	1–2	1–0
TIL 2020	1–0	1–0	5–0	1–0	1–0	1–1	6–0	—	3–0	0–1
Øvrevoll Hosle	2–3	1–0	3–2	2–1	0–2	4–1	3–0	5–1	—	1–0
Åsane	4–0	2–0	4–0	1–0	3–1	1–0	1–0	0–0	4–1	—

Source: Norwegian Football Federation
Legend: Blue = home team win; Yellow = draw; Red = away team win.

== First Division play-offs ==
The teams from 3rd to 10th position take part in the First Division play-offs. They carry over their points and goal difference from the regular season. Each team plays seven matches, once against each of the other teams. The winners qualify for the promotion play-offs, where they will face the 6th placed team in the Toppserien relegation round. The bottom two teams are relegated.

Pos	Team	Pld	W	D	L	GF	GA	GD	Pts	Qualification or relegation
1	Øvrevoll Hosle	7	3	2	2	51	34	+17	47	Qualification for the promotion play-offs
2	Hønefoss	7	4	1	2	48	42	+6	40	
3	KIL/Hemne	7	3	0	4	33	35	−2	38	
4	AaFK Fortuna	7	3	1	3	45	41	+4	35	
5	Grand Bodø	7	4	2	1	38	46	−8	32	
6	Klepp	7	2	1	4	46	56	−10	27	
7	Amazon Grimstad (R)	7	3	1	3	28	42	−14	24	Relegation to Second Division
8	Medkila (R)	7	2	0	5	25	69	−44	16	Relegation to Second Division

Source: NFF (in Norwegian)
Rules for classification: 1) Points; 2) Goal difference; 3) Goals scored; 4) Head-to-head points; 5) Head-to-head goal difference; 6) Head-to-head goals scored.
(R) Relegated

=== Results ===
Home \ Away	AFK	AMA	GRA	HØN	KIL	KLE	MED	ØVH
AaFK Fortuna	—	—	1–1	—	1–0	6–1	—	—
Amazon Grimstad	1–0	—	—	—	—	2–2	2–0	1–0
Grand Bodø	—	2–1	—	3–0	—	—	2–0	—
Hønefoss	1–0	3–1	—	—	—	—	3–0	2–2
KIL/Hemne	—	3–1	1–2	0–1	—	3–1	—	—
Klepp	—	—	5–0	4–2	—	—	2–3	0–4
Medkila	1–3	—	—	—	2–4	—	—	5–1
Øvrevoll Hosle	2–1	—	2–2	—	4–0	—	—	—

Source: Norwegian Football Federation
Legend: Blue = home team win; Yellow = draw; Red = away team win.

== Top scorers ==
Rank	Player	Club	Goals
1	(Norway) Katarina Dybvik Sunde	Åsane	14
2	(Norway) Emilie Finnevolden	Hønefoss	13
3	(Norway) Silje Nyhagen	Åsane	12
4	(Norway) Sandra Simonsen	TIL 2020	11
