= 2018 Norwegian First Division (women) =

1. divisjon
- Season: 2018
- Champions: Fart
- Promoted: Fart
- Relegated: Urædd; Bossekop
- Matches played: 132
- Goals scored: 382 (2.89 per match)
- Average attendance: 101
- All statistics correct as of 3 November 2018.

The 2018 1. divisjon was the second tier of Norwegian women's football in 2018. The season kicked off on 14 April 2018, finishing on 3 November 2018.

The top placed team was promoted to next year's Toppserien. The second placed team contested a playoff against the 11th placed team from the 2018 Toppserien for the right to play in Toppserien next season.

== Table ==
1. Fart – Promoted
2. Grei
3. Byåsen
4. Øvrevoll Hosle
5. Medkila
6. Amazon Grimstad
7. Fløya
8. Åsane
9. Kaupanger
10. Nanset
11. Urædd – Relegated
12. Bossekop – Relegated
