= Vegar Bjerke =

Norwegian footballer

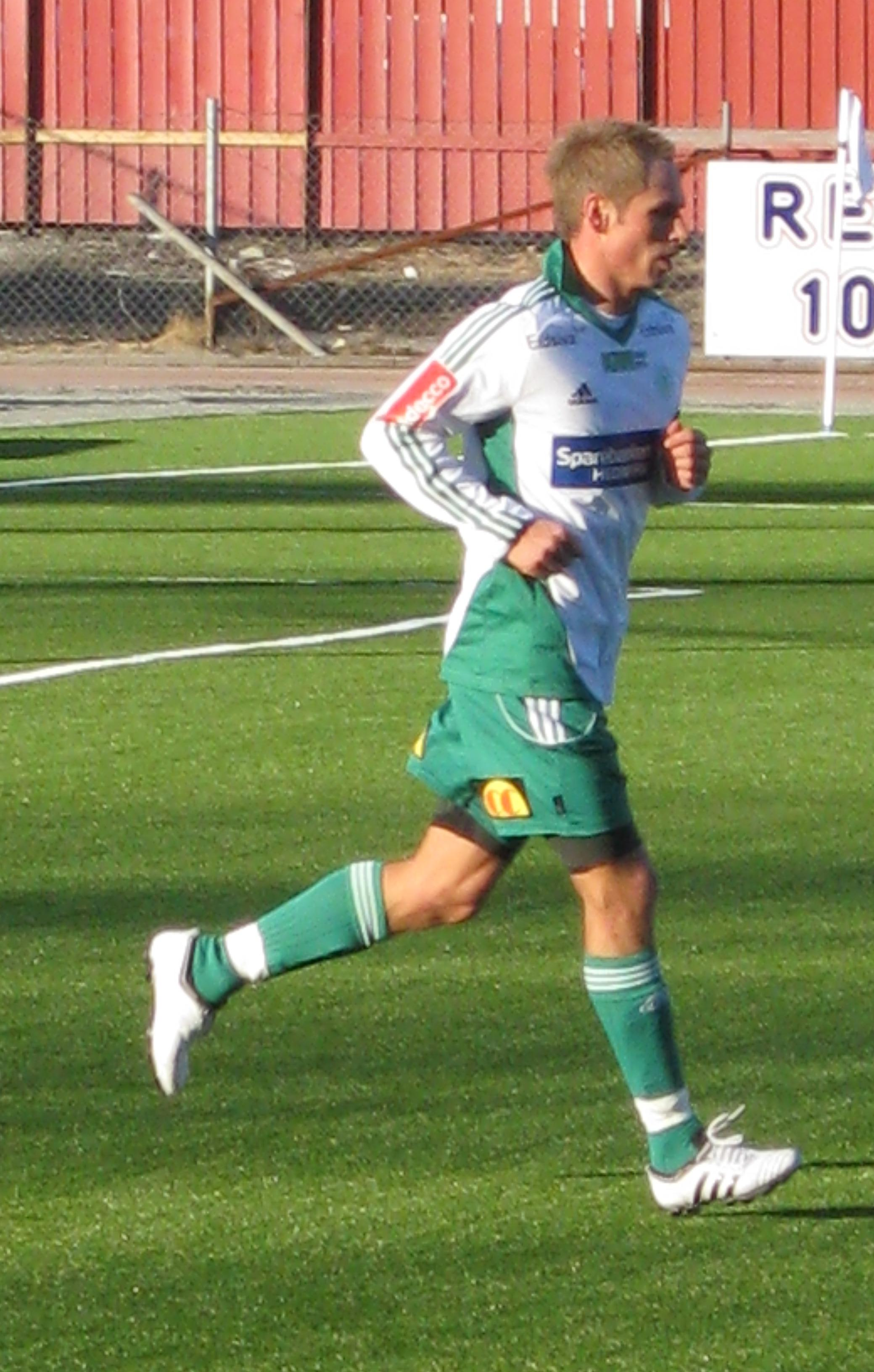

Personal information
- Date of birth: July 28, 1979 (age 47)
- Place of birth: Lillehammer
- Height: 1.78 m (5 ft 10 in)
- Positions: Midfielder; defender

Youth career
- –1996: Moelven IL

Senior career*
Years	Team	Apps	(Gls)
1997–2013	HamKam	288	(22)
2000	→HamKam 2 (loan)	1	(0)
2006	→HamKam 2 (loan)	2	(0)
2007	→HamKam 2 (loan)	1	(0)
2013	→HamKam 2 (loan)	2	(0)
2014	Moelven IL	12	(4)
Total		306	(26)

International career
1998	Norway U-19	3	(0)
1999	Norway U-20	5	(0)

Managerial career
- 2014: Moelven IL
- Moelven IL (coach)
- Storhamar IL (youth coach)
- * Club domestic league appearances and goals

Vegar Bjerke (born 28 July 1979 in Lillehammer) is a former Norwegian footballer who played for Hamarkameratene from 1997 to 2013. He grew up in Moelv and has spent his entire senior playing career at the same club. He has eight caps for youth national teams. Bjerke was also a coach for Moelven IL.

== Club career ==
Bjerke started on the reserve team of Ham-Kam in 1997 but quickly found himself in the first team squad during the season, debuting against IK Start on 31 August 1997. On 2 July 2006, he played his 200th match when he came on as a substitute in the second half of the 12th round of the 2006 Tippeligaen match against SK Brann. In 1999, Bjerke had a trial with Belgian club RSC Anderlecht.

In November 2013, it was announced that Bjerke was retiring from football after playing over 300 matches for Hamarkameratene, and that he would become the general player-manager of his hometown club Moelven IL.

== Business career ==
In August 2010, Bjerke came into media focus due to his ownership in the company SID Norge, which was reported for large-scale fraud, however Bjerke always maintained his innocence. The charges were dropped by the Hedmark District Police. Following the company's bankruptcy, Bjerke and his partner were given a two-year bankruptcy restriction, which included a ban on forming new companies. Later, he started a business in the insurance industry.
