= Trond Viggo Toresen =

Norwegian footballer (born 1978)

Personal information
- Date of birth: 22 February 1978 (age 48)
- Place of birth: Levanger Municipality, Norway
- Height: 1.80 m (5 ft 11 in)
- Position: Midfielder

Team information
- Current team: Verdal
- Number: 2

Youth career
- Verdal

Senior career*
Years	Team	Apps	(Gls)
1997	Verdal		
1998–2002	Byåsen	89	(0)
2003	Pors Grenland	22	(8)
2004–2007	Odd Grenland	72	(0)
2008–2009	Notodden	33	(10)
2010	Levanger	26	(5)
2011–	Verdal	106	(13)

International career^{‡}
1993	Norway U15	9	(1)
1994	Norway U16	1	(0)
1995	Norway U17	6	(1)
1996	Norway U18	5	(0)
- * Club domestic league appearances and goals as of 14 December 2012 ‡ National team caps and goals as of 23 May 2009

Trond Viggo Toresen (born 22 February 1978) is a Norwegian football midfielder who currently plays for Verdal.

He joined the team from Levanger in 2011. Before he went back to his home towns of Verdal and Levanger he played in Norwegian Tippeliga and Adeccoliga for Odd Grenland and Notodden as a midfielder. He was a regular midfielder on the Odd team which played in Tippeligaen.
