= Heidi Støre =

Norwegian footballer (born 1963)

Personal information
- Full name: Heidi Elin Støre
- Date of birth: 4 July 1963 (age 63)
- Place of birth: Sarpsborg, Norway
- Position: Midfielder

Senior career*
Years	Team	Apps	(Gls)
1979–1984	Sprint-Jeløy		
1985–1988	Trollhättan		
1995	Kolbotn		
1995–1999	Nikko		
1997	Athene Moss		

International career
1980–1997	Norway	151	(22)
- * Club domestic league appearances and goals

Heidi Elin Støre (born 4 July 1963) is a Norwegian former footballer who played as a midfielder. As captain for the Norway national team, she won the 1995 FIFA Women's World Cup.

== Personal life ==
Born in Sarpsborg on 4 July 1963, Støre is a daughter of Harald Magne Støre and Henny Josefine Støre. Her registered partner since 1999 is Agnete Synnøve Carlsen.

== Career ==
Støre played for the clubs Sprint-Jeløy (Norway), Trollhättan (Sweden), Kolbotn (Norway), Nikko (Japan) and Athene Moss (Norway). She made her debut for the Norway national team in 1980, and played 151 matches for the national team.

She was world champion with the Norwegian team in 1995, received a silver medal in 1991, and won the unofficial world championship tournament in 1988. She was European champion from 1987 and 1993, and received silver medals in 1989 and 1991. She won an Olympic bronze medal with the Norwegian team in 1996.

Støre ended her active career in 1997, but returned as administrator of women's football in 2005. She was appointed leader of the department Toppfotball kvinner of the Football Association of Norway from 2013.

== Honours ==
Norway

- FIFA Women's World Cup: 1995; runner-up 1991

Individual

- Kniksen Award: 1993 with Norway

== See also ==
- List of women's footballers with 100 or more international caps
