= 2015 Norwegian First Division (women) =

1. divisjon
- Season: 2015
- Champions: Urædd
- Promoted: Urædd
- Relegated: Haugar; Sarpsborg 08
- Matches played: 132
- Goals scored: 448 (3.39 per match)
- Average attendance: 84

The 2015 1. divisjon was the second tier of Norwegian women's football in 2015. The season kicked off on 18 April 2015, finishing on 8 November 2015.

The top placed team wase promoted to next year's Toppserien. The second placed team contested a playoff against the 11th placed team from the 2015 Toppserien for the right to play in Toppserien next season.

== Table ==
1. Urædd − promoted
2. Grand Bodø
3. Åsane
4. Kongsvinger
5. Lyn
6. Byåsen
7. Fart
8. Øvrevoll Hosle
9. Fortuna Ålesund
10. Grei
11. Haugar − relegated
12. Sarpsborg 08 − relegated
