= Rugile Rulyte =

Norwegian footballer (born 2002)

Personal information
- Full name: Rugile Maria Rulyte
- Date of birth: 7 July 2002 (age 24)
- Place of birth: Lithuania
- Height: 1.75 m (5 ft 9 in)
- Position: Goalkeeper

Team information
- Current team: Rosenborg
- Number: 1

Youth career
- –2017: Leksvik
- 2019: Trondheims-Ørn

Senior career*
Years	Team	Apps	(Gls)
2020–	Rosenborg	31	(0)

International career^{‡}
2017	Norway U15	1	(0)
2020	Norway U18	2	(0)
2020	Norway U19	1	(0)
2021	Norway U23	1	(0)
2021–	Norway	1	(0)
- * Club domestic league appearances and goals as of 1 December 2021 ‡ National team caps and goals as of 1 December 2021

Rugile Rulyte (born 7 July 2002) is a professional footballer who plays as a goalkeeper for Rosenborg. Born in Lithuania, she represents the Norway national team.

== Career ==
Her family migrated to Norway when she was 10 years old, settling in Leksvik. She took up football, became a youth international and then a junior team player for Trondheims-Ørn, which changed its name to Rosenborg in 2020. Still under 20 of age, Rulyte was backup to Kristine Nøstmo in the 2020 and 2021. Nøstmo had previously retired from international play, and in the fall of 2021 Nøstmo announced her intention to retire altogether, opening for Rulyte as the new first-choice.

After only a few youth international games, Rulyte received her first call-up for Norway in August 2021 at the age of 19. At this point, she had only played 10 games in the Toppserien. She started her first match in November 2021 against the World Cup qualifier Armenia. The match was interrupted 20 minutes before the end due to fog. The last 20 minutes of the match were played the next day, and Norway eventually won 10–0. In doing so, she became the first immigrant to feature for Norway in 12 years, the last one was Nasra Abdullah against Sweden in 2009.

Before she was selected for the Norwegian national team, Rulyte had received a request to represent the Lithuanian national team, but chose to decline and justified the choice by saying that she feels more connected to Norway than to Lithuania and that she feels the opportunities are greater with Norway.

== Honours ==
=== Club ===
Rosenborg

- Norwegian Cup: 2023
