= 2014 Norwegian First Division (women) =

1. divisjon
- Season: 2014
- Champions: Sandviken
- Promoted: Sandviken
- Relegated: Kaupanger; Fløya
- Matches played: 132
- Goals scored: 464 (3.52 per match)
- Total attendance: 11,597
- Average attendance: 87

The 2014 1. divisjon was the second tier of Norwegian women's football in 2014. The season kicked off on 21 April 2014, finishing on 26 October 2014.

The top placed team was promoted to next year's Toppserien. The second placed team contested a playoff against the 11th placed team from the 2014 Toppserien for the right to play in Toppserien next season.

== Table ==
1. Sandviken − promoted
2. Sarpsborg 08
3. Urædd
4. Fortuna Ålesund
5. Øvrevoll Hosle
6. Lyn
7. Kongsvinger
8. Fart
9. Grei
10. Åsane
11. Kaupanger − relegated
12. Fløya − relegated
