= 2017 Norwegian First Division (women) =

1. divisjon
- Season: 2017
- Champions: Lyn
- Promoted: Lyn
- Relegated: KIL/Hemne; Kongsvinger
- Matches played: 132
- Goals scored: 426 (3.23 per match)
- Average attendance: 117

The 2017 1. divisjon was the second tier of Norwegian women's football in 2017. The season kicked off on 17 April 2017, finishing on 4 November 2017.

The top placed team was promoted to next year's Toppserien. The second placed team contested a playoff against the 11th placed team from the 2017 Toppserien for the right to play in Toppserien next season.

== Table ==
1. Lyn − promoted
2. Urædd
3. Øvrevoll Hosle
4. Byåsen
5. Bossekop
6. Åsane
7. Fløya
8. Grei
9. Amazon Grimstad
10. Fart
11. KIL/Hemne − relegated
12. Kongsvinger − relegated
