= Toppserien =

Women's association football league in Norway

- Founded: 1984; 42 years ago 1996–present (as Toppserien); 1984–1995 (as 1. divisjon)
- Country: Norway
- Confederation: UEFA
- Divisions: 1
- Number of clubs: 12
- Level on pyramid: 1
- Relegation to: 1. divisjon
- Domestic cup: Norwegian Cup
- International cup: UEFA Champions League
- Current champions: Brann (4th title) (2026)
- Most championships: LSK Kvinner; Rosenborg (7 titles each)
- Broadcasters: NRK; TV 2
- Website: toppserien.no
- Current: 2026 Toppserien

The Toppserien is the top level of women's association football in Norway. Founded in 1984, the league acquired official status in 1987 and was named 1. divisjon fotball for kvinner until 1995, when the name "Toppserien" was officially adopted ahead of the 1996 season.

The league consisted of 10 teams from 1987 to 2006, and 12 teams from 2007 to 2019. Before the 2020 season, a new league structure was decided, which involved reducing to 10 teams and introducing play-offs, before returning to 12 teams from 2026. In 2025, Toppserien was ranked as the eighth-best women's football league in Europe according to the UEFA coefficient ranking.

== History ==
Women's league football was introduced on a county basis in 1977. These leagues acted as qualification for the regional (South) league in 1979. Regional leagues were in operation until the formation of the First Division 1984, when the league was divided into three regions, Group Eastern-Norway (Østlandet), Group Western-Norway (Vestlandet), and Group Mid-Norway (Trøndelag). No teams from Northern-Norway (Nord-Norge) played, however. The winners of the three groups met each other for a play-off. Regional leagues for women had been played before 1984, and a championship play-off had been done between the winners of Mid-Norway and Eastern-Norway in 1983 (Trondheims-Ørn beat Setskog 2-1), but this championship was considered unofficial by the Football Association of Norway. In 1986, a group for Northern-Norway was added, and in 1987, the groups and play-off matches were dropped, and one single league with teams from all over the country was played.

The league was known as 1. divisjon (Norwegian for 1st Division) from 1984 to 1995, the Eliteserien (Norwegian for The Elite League) from 1996 to 1999, and the Toppserien (Norwegian for The Top League) from 2000.

Traditionally, Trondheims-Ørn and Asker was the two power-houses of Toppserien, with 7 and 6 championship wins respectively. Trondheims-Ørn finished in the top three 16 out of 23 times from the beginning in 1984 to their current last medal in 2006. In 1998, Asker managed the almost unthinkable, winning every single one of their 18 league games that season (Asker didn't win the double that season, however, as the club was knocked out of the semi-finals of the cup by Trondheims-Ørn). However Asker FK, the women's team within Asker Fotball, became bankrupt at the end of 2008 and most of the players were transferred to a new team within the nearby Stabæk IF, named Stabæk FK (FK = Fotball Kvinner (Football Women)). Asker finished among the top three 18 out of the 25 seasons the club existed. The new Stabæk team began playing in the Toppserien from the 2009 season and won the league in 2010 and 2013. Røa won Toppserien five times from 2004 to 2011. Lillestrøm SK Kvinner won six consecutive titles from 2014 to 2019.

== Competition format ==
The league currently consists of 12 teams, which play each other 2 times (home and away), for a total of 24 matches. The season lasts from April to November. Teams are ranked by:

- Number of points (3 points per win, 1 point per draw).
- Goal difference
- Goals scored
- Results between the tied teams.

== Clubs ==
=== Current members ===
Locations of teams in the 2026 Toppserien

Team	Home city	Home ground	Since	First app.	Seasons
Bodø/Glimt	Bodø	Aspmyra Stadion	2025	2025	2
Brann	Bergen	Brann Stadion	2013	2004 (Note: As Sandviken)	36
Haugesund	Haugesund	Haugesund Stadion	2026	2013 (Note: As Avaldsnes)	12
Hønefoss	Hønefoss	AKA Arena	2025	2025	2
LSK Kvinner	Lillestrøm	LSK-Hallen	1984	1984 (Note: As Setskog, Setskog/Høland and Team Strømmen)	43
Lyn	Oslo	Kringsjå	2018	2018	8
Molde	Molde	Molde	2026	1994	2
Rosenborg	Trondheim	Lerkendal Stadion	1984	1984 (Note: As Trondheims-Ørn)	43
Røa	Oslo	Røa-banen	2022	2001	25
Stabæk	Bærum	Nadderud Stadion	2021	2009	17
Vålerenga	Oslo	Intility Arena	2012	2012	15
Aalesund	Ålesund	Color Line Stadion	2026	2009 (Note: As Fortuna)	2

== List of champions ==
=== Medalists by year ===
The following medals have been awarded:

Year	Champions	Runners-up	Third place	Name of league
1984	Sprint-Jeløy (1)	Trondheims-Ørn	Nymark	1. divisjon
1985	Nymark (1)	Asker	Trondheims-Ørn	1. divisjon
1986	Sprint-Jeløy (2)	Troll	Klepp; Grand	1. divisjon
1987	Klepp (1)	Sprint-Jeløy	Asker	1. divisjon
1988	Asker (1)	Klepp	Trondheims-Ørn	1. divisjon
1989	Asker (2)	Sprint-Jeløy	Klepp	1. divisjon
1990	Sprint-Jeløy (3)	Asker	Klepp	1. divisjon
1991	Asker (3)	Sprint-Jeløy	Sandviken	1. divisjon
1992	Asker (4)	Setskog/Høland	Sprint-Jeløy	1. divisjon
1993	Sprint-Jeløy (4)	Trondheims-Ørn	Asker	1. divisjon
1994	Trondheims-Ørn (1)	Asker	Sprint-Jeløy	1. divisjon
1995	Trondheims-Ørn (2)	Setskog/Høland	Sandviken	1. divisjon
1996	Trondheims-Ørn (3)	Sandviken	Asker	Eliteserien
1997	Trondheims-Ørn (4)	Asker	Klepp	Eliteserien
1998	Asker (5)	Trondheims-Ørn	Athene Moss	Eliteserien
1999	Asker (6)	Trondheims-Ørn	Klepp	Eliteserien
2000	Trondheims-Ørn (5)	Asker	Kolbotn	Toppserien
2001	Trondheims-Ørn (6)	Kolbotn	Arna-Bjørnar	Toppserien
2002	Kolbotn (1)	Asker	Trondheims-Ørn	Toppserien
2003	Trondheims-Ørn (7)	Kolbotn	Asker	Toppserien
2004	Røa (1)	Trondheims-Ørn	Fløya	Toppserien
2005	Kolbotn (2)	Team Strømmen	Fløya	Toppserien
2006	Kolbotn (3)	Trondheims-Ørn	Røa	Toppserien
2007	Røa (2)	Kolbotn	Asker	Toppserien
2008	Røa (3)	Team Strømmen	Asker	Toppserien
2009	Røa (4)	Stabæk	Kolbotn	Toppserien
2010	Stabæk (1)	Røa	Kolbotn	Toppserien
2011	Røa (5)	Stabæk	Kolbotn	Toppserien
2012	LSK Kvinner (1)	Stabæk	Arna-Bjørnar	Toppserien
2013	Stabæk (2)	LSK Kvinner	Arna-Bjørnar	Toppserien
2014	LSK Kvinner (2)	Stabæk	Arna-Bjørnar	Toppserien
2015	LSK Kvinner (3)	Avaldsnes	Røa	Toppserien
2016	LSK Kvinner (4)	Avaldsnes	Stabæk	Toppserien
2017	LSK Kvinner (5)	Avaldsnes	Stabæk	Toppserien
2018	LSK Kvinner (6)	Klepp	Arna-Bjørnar	Toppserien
2019	LSK Kvinner (7)	Vålerenga	Klepp	Toppserien
2020	Vålerenga (1)	Rosenborg	Avaldsnes	Toppserien
2021	Sandviken (1)	Rosenborg	LSK Kvinner	Toppserien
2022	Brann (2)	Vålerenga	Rosenborg	Toppserien
2023	Vålerenga (2)	Rosenborg	LSK Kvinner	Toppserien
2024	Vålerenga (3)	Brann	Rosenborg	Toppserien
2025	Brann (3)	Vålerenga	Rosenborg	Toppserien
2026	Brann (4)	Aalesund	Rosenborg	Toppserien

Below is a list of the gold, silver and bronze medalists in the Toppserien since its beginning in 1984. The Norwegian Women's Cup has been played since 1978. From 1984 to 1995 the name of the league was 1. divisjon ("First Division"), and between 1996 and 1999 the name was Eliteserien ("The Elite League", a generic name) before getting its current name, Toppserien in 2000.

From 1984 to 1985, the league was divided into three sections, and after the inclusion of teams from Northern Norway there was four sections in 1986, with the championship decided through a play-off. Since then it has been a round-robin decided through a league table.

=== Medalists by club ===
The following clubs have won the top division in Norwegian football since 1984.

As of after the 2026 season

Club	Winner	Runner-up	Third
Rosenborg^{4}	7	9	7
LSK Kvinner^{3}	7	5	2
Asker^{1}	6	6	6
Røa	5	1	2
Sprint/Jeløy^{2}	4	3	3
Brann^{5}	4	2	2
Kolbotn	3	3	4
Vålerenga	3	3	0
Stabæk^{1}	2	4	2
Klepp	1	2	6
Nymark	1	0	1
Haugesund^{6}	0	3	1
Troll	0	1	0
Aalesunds FK	0	1	0
Arna-Bjørnar	0	0	5
Fløya	0	0	2
Grand Bodø^{7}	0	0	1

^{1} = In 2008 Stabæk was handed the license to play in the top league, and also took over the best players from Asker, because of financial problems in the latter. But the rest of Asker remains, and they still have their top female team - in league three. Therefore, Stabæk is not to be considered the successor of Asker.
^{2} = Athene Moss was Sprint/Jeløy successor, so one bronze as Athene Moss in 1998 is included.
^{3} = LSK Kvinner is the successor of Setskog/Høland and Team Strømmen.
^{4} = Rosenborg is the successor of Trondheims-Ørn.
^{5} = Brann is the successor of Sandviken.
^{6} = Haugesund is the successor of Avaldsnes.
^{7} = In 2025 Bodø/Glimt took over the women's team of Grand Bodø, but Grand Bodø continues to field a senior women's team in the lower leagues. Therefore, Bodø/Glimt is not to be considered the successor of Grand Bodø.

== Managers ==
Current Toppserien managers
Manager	Nationality	Club	Appointed	Time as manager
Nils Lexerud	Norway	Vålerenga	3 January 2022	4 years, 314 days
André Bergdølmo	Norway	LSK Kvinner	5 December 2022	3 years, 343 days
Cato André Hansen	Norway	Bodø/Glimt	1 January 2024	2 years, 316 days
Robin Shroot	Northern Ireland	Rosenborg	11 January 2024	2 years, 306 days
Ole-Petter Pedersen Bremstein	Norway	Haugesund	18 November 2024	1 year, 360 days
Kent Rudning	Norway	Molde	1 January 2025	1 year, 316 days
August Nyland	Norway	Lyn	7 October 2025	1 year, 37 days
Martin Lindmark	Norway	Aalesund	4 November 2025	1 year, 9 days
Remi Natvik	Norway	Hønefoss	15 December 2025	333 days
Luke Torjussen	England	Stabæk	1 January 2026	316 days
Fredrik Sæland	Norway	Røa	8 January 2026	309 days
Laura Kaminski	England	Brann	8 January 2026	309 days

== See also ==
- List of football clubs in Norway
- List of Toppserien clubs
- Eliteserien (men's top division)
