= IF Skidar =

Norwegian football club

- Full name: Idrettsforeningen Skidar
- Founded: 1 September 1916
- Ground: Helges plass, Skien
- League: Fourth Division
- 2025: 3rd (Fifth Division, promoted)

Idrettsforeningen Skidar is a Norwegian association football club from south central Skien.

The club was founded as IF Falk on 1 September 1916. Being a multi-sports club at the time, it also had a section for team handball. The team colours are red and black.

The women's football team played one season the first tier in Norway. Having won promotion in 1985, the team contested the Østland group in 1986, but ended last and were relegated.

The men's football team currently plays in the Fourth Division, the fifth tier of football in Norway, having won promotion through playoff in 2025.
