= 2016 Toppserien =

Toppserien
- Season: 2016
- Champions: LSK Kvinner
- Relegated: Urædd
- Women's Champions League: LSK Kvinner; Avaldsnes
- Total attendance: 25,081
- Average attendance: 190 ▼15.6%

The 2016 Toppserien was the 33rd season of the women's football top-level league in Norway. LSK Kvinner FK were the defending champions and defended their title.

== League table ==
Pos	Team	Pld	W	D	L	GF	GA	GD	Pts	Qualification or relegation
1	LSK Kvinner (C)	22	19	3	0	88	10	+78	60	Qualification for the Champions League round of 32
2	Avaldsnes	22	18	2	2	50	17	+33	56	Qualification for the Champions League qualifying round
3	Stabæk	22	12	6	4	39	17	+22	42	
4	Kolbotn	22	12	4	6	32	17	+15	40	
5	Røa	22	9	6	7	34	31	+3	33	
6	Sandviken	22	7	6	9	29	28	+1	27	
7	Trondheims-Ørn	22	7	6	9	34	41	−7	27	
8	Arna-Bjørnar	22	7	4	11	22	38	−16	25	
9	Vålerenga	22	6	5	11	25	48	−23	23	
10	Klepp	22	6	2	14	32	49	−17	20	
11	Medkila (O)	22	2	5	15	21	50	−29	11	Qualification for the relegation play-offs
12	Urædd (R)	22	1	3	18	12	72	−60	6	Relegation to First Division

Source: NIFS
Rules for classification: 1) Points; 2) Goal difference; 3) Number of goals scored; 4) Head-to-head points; 5) Head-to-head goal difference; 6) Head-to-head away goals scored
(C) Champions; (O) Play-off winners; (R) Relegated

== Relegation play-offs ==
Medkila won the relegation play-offs 4–3 and 2–0 against Lyn and remained in the league.

== Top scorers ==
As of 25 December 2016.

Rank	Player	Club	Goals
1	(Norway) Isabell Herlovsen	LSK Kvinner	30
2	(Norway) Emilie Haavi	LSK Kvinner	13
3	(Norway) Cecilie Pedersen	Avaldsnes	10
3	(Netherlands) Sherida Spitse	LSK Kvinner	10
3	(Norway) Line Krogedal Smørsgård	Klepp	10
6	(Norway) Guro Reiten	Trondheims-Ørn	9
7	(Norway) Elisabeth Jeppesen	Røa	8
8	6 Players		7
14	9 Players		6
