= Nymark IL =

Norwegian sports club

- Full name: Nymark Idrettslag
- Founded: 21 April 1921
- Ground: Nymarksbanene
- League: Second Division (women); Fourth Division (men)
Home colours

Nymark Idrettslag is a Norwegian sports club from Årstad, Bergen. It has sections for association football, cycling and athletics.

It was founded on 21 April 1921, and was a member of Arbeidernes Idrettsforbund until that association ceased to exist. The football fields Nymarksbanene were established near Brann stadion in the 1960s, and are now the club's home fields.

The women's football team won the Norwegian First Division Championship in 1985, but was relegated already in 1986, and now plays in the Second Division (third tier). The men's football team currently plays in the Fourth Division (fifth tier). It has been playing as high as in the Third Division (fourth tier). Their team colors are black and white.
