= Brit Sandaune =

Norwegian footballer (born 1972)

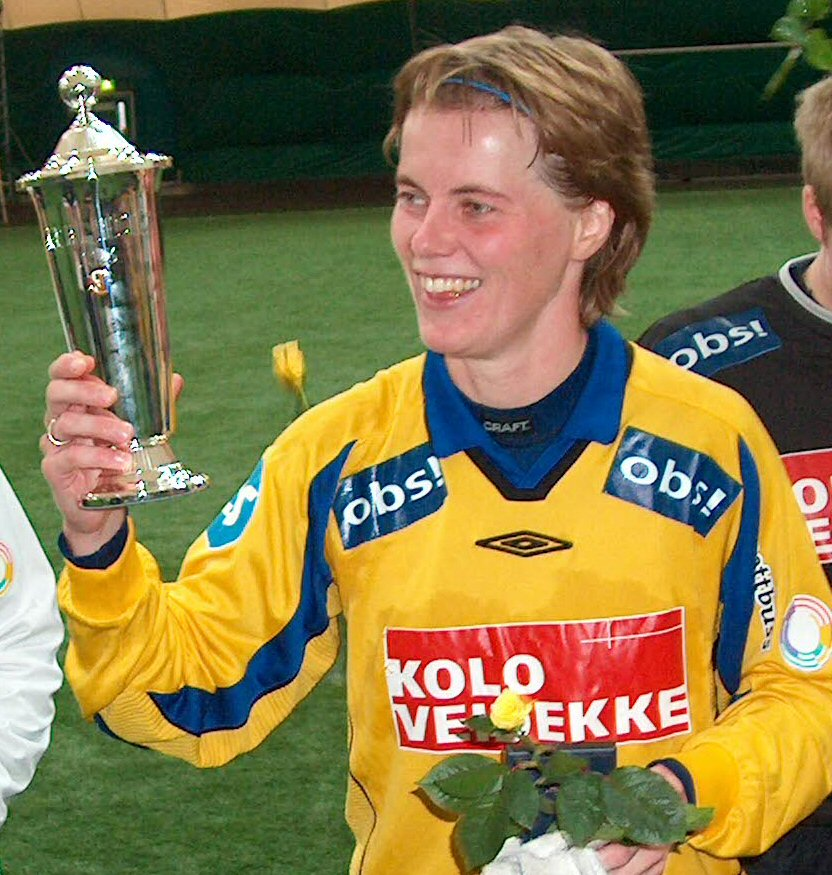
- Sandaune in 2003

Personal information
- Date of birth: 5 June 1972 (age 54)
- Place of birth: Skatval, Norway
- Height: 1.72 m (5 ft 8 in)
- Position: Defender

Youth career
- –1985: IL Fram

Senior career*
| Years | Team | Apps | (Gls) |
| 1985–1989 | IL Stjørdals-Blink | | |
| 1990–2004 | Trondheims-Ørn | 258 | (127) |

International career
| 1988 | Norway U16 | 3 | (1) |
| 1990–1993 | Norway U20 | 3 | (0) |
| 1995–2003 | Norway | 120 | (9) |
Medal record
Women's football
Representing Norway
Olympic Games
| Gold medal – first place | 2000 Atlanta | Team competition |
| Bronze medal – third place | 1996 Atlanta | Team competition |
- * Club domestic league appearances and goals

Brit Sandaune (born 5 June 1972) is a Norwegian former footballer who played as a defender.

== Career ==
Sandaune has (per 2001) won six league championships and seven Norwegian national championship (with Trondheims-Ørn SK) in women's soccer. She is an Olympic Gold and Bronze medallist.

Sandaune played 120 international matches for Norway, scoring nine goals. With the Norway team she went to the Olympic Games in 1996 in Atlanta, winning Bronze. Four years later at the Sydney Olympics she won Gold with the Norwegian team. In July 2002 Brit reached 100 matches played for the A-team. She got the Fair Play prize in woman soccer in 2000.

At club level Sandaune played a record 507 matches for Trondheims-Ørn, winning the Norwegian cup competition eight times and the Toppserien league seven times between 1993 and 2003.

== Personal life ==
Sandaune is originally from the rural area of Skatval in Stjørdal Municipality in Nord-Trøndelag county. She was educated in economy and administration. She settled in Trondheim Municipality with her cohabitant Roy Nilsen. She works as a pre-school teacher.

== See also ==
- List of women's footballers with 100 or more international caps
