= Agnete Carlsen =

Norwegian footballer (born 1971)

Personal information
- Full name: Agnete Synnøve Carlsen
- Date of birth: 15 January 1971 (age 55)
- Place of birth: Moss, Norway
- Height: 1.67 m (5 ft 6 in)
- Position: Midfielder

Senior career*
Years	Team	Apps	(Gls)
1987–1995	SK Sprint-Jeløy		
1996–1998	Nikko Securities		
1996	→ Kolbotn (loan)		
1997	→ Athene Moss (loan)	7	(1)

International career^{‡}
1988–1997	Norway	97	(17)
Medal record
Women's football
Representing Norway
Olympic Games
Bronze medal – third place	1996 Atlanta	Team
World Cup
Gold medal – first place	Sweden 1995	Team
Silver medal – second place	China 1991	Team
European Championship
Gold medal – first place	Italy 1993	Team
Silver medal – second place	Denmark 1991	Team
Silver medal – second place	Germany 1989	Team
- * Club domestic league appearances and goals as of 14:16, 18 September 2014 (UTC) ‡ National team caps and goals as of 14:16, 18 September 2014 (UTC)

Agnete Synnøve Carlsen (born 15 January 1971) is a former Norwegian professional footballer who played as a midfielder. With the Norway women's national team, Carlsen won the 1995 FIFA Women's World Cup and an Olympic bronze medal in 1996. At club level Carlsen played for SK Sprint-Jeløy in Norway, then joined Japanese L. League team Nikko Securities Dream Ladies on a professional contract.

== Personal life ==
Carlsen was born in Moss on 15 January 1971.

== International career ==
Carlsen made her debut for the senior Norway women's national football team in June 1988, starting a 2–1 defeat by Brazil at the 1988 FIFA Women's Invitation Tournament in China. She scored her first goal in her second appearance, a 3–0 win over the Netherlands in Rijsoord.

In July 1989 Carlsen played in Norway's 4–1 defeat by West Germany in the 1989 European Competition for Women's Football final. The match was played before 22,000 fans in Osnabrück. Two years later, the competition had been rebranded as the UEFA Women's Championship and Carlsen's Norway again lost to the Germans in the final, 3–1 this time. Norway also reached the final of the inaugural 1991 FIFA Women's World Cup, held in China in November 1991. They lost 2–1 to the United States after Michelle Akers' late winning goal in front of 63,000 at Tianhe Stadium in Guangzhou.

Carlsen got her first winner's medal with the national team when Norway beat hosts Italy 1–0 in the 1993 UEFA Women's Championship final. She was also part of the squad which won the 1995 FIFA Women's World Cup in Sweden, but was restricted to two substitute appearances during the tournament.

At the inaugural Olympic women's football tournament at the 1996 Atlanta Olympics, Carlsen was sent-off in Norway's semi-final defeat by the United States. She was suspended for the subsequent bronze medal match in which Norway defeated Brazil 2–0. Carlsen played in Norway's 1997 UEFA Women's Championship campaign, then retired from international football to concentrate on her professional club career in Japan. She won 97 caps and scored 17 goals.

=== International ===
As of 19 September 2014.

Norway national team
Year	Apps	Goals
1988	2	1
1989	5	0
1990	15	1
1991	17	6
1992	11	3
1993	9	3
1994	12	3
1995	2	0
1996	13	0
1997	11	0
Total	97	17
