= Kaupanger IL =

Norwegian sports club

- Full name: Kaupanger Idrettslag
- Ground: Kaupanger stadion
- Manager: Marius Lenni Bøe (women)
- League: 1. Division (women); 4. Division (men)
- 2012: 2. Division Hordaland, 1st (promoted) (women); 4. Division Sogn og Fjordane, 9th (men)
- Website: http://www.kaupangerfotball.no/
Home colours	Away colours

Kaupanger Idrettslag is a Norwegian sports club from Kaupanger in Sogndal Municipality. It has sections for association football, athletics, floorball and skiing.

The men's football team currently plays in the Third Division, the fourth tier of Norwegian football. The women's team plays in the First Division, which is the second tier. They played in the Premier League as late as in 1999, and they were represented at the 1991 FIFA Women's World Cup by Anette Igland. Kaupanger stadion is their home field, and the team colors are green and black.

== Recent seasons ==
Season		Pos.	Pl.	W	D	L	GS	GA	P	Cup	Notes
2008	D2	3	18	9	3	6	39	33	30	1st round	
2009	D2	2	18	14	0	4	49	26	42	1st round	
2010	D2	2	22	17	1	4	92	50	52	2nd round	
2011	D2	2	22	16	1	5	81	33	49	1st round	
2012	D2	1	22	17	3	2	80	15	54	2nd round	Promoted
2013 (in progress)	D1	9	18	5	3	10	22	44	18	3rd round	
