= Heimdal IF =

Norwegian football club

- Full name: Heimdal Idrettsforening
- Founded: 1 January 1929
- Ground: Heimdal stadion, Trondheim
- League: Fourth Division
- 2025: 12th

Heimdal Idrettsforening is a Norwegian multi-sports club from Heimdal, Trondheim. It has sections for association football, team handball and Nordic skiing.

The club was founded as Heimdal IL on 1 January 1929 in what was an "agricultural community" at the time, later a suburb of Norway's third largest city Trondheim. Another club Heimdal IF sprung up in 1934, and this name was continued in 1939 as he two clubs merged and th former Heimdal IL left the Workers' Confederation of Sports behind. It also had sections for athletics and orienteering in its early history. The club colours were green, red and black, the red being a column on the green jersey.

The men's handball team played in the Eliteserien from 1997 until 2007, when bankruptcy ensued.

Skier Ole Christian Eidhammer and athlete Sissel Grottenberg were among Heimdal IF's individual sportspeople. In modern times, Heimdal IF was organized as an alliance sports club, with its individual sports forming its own judicial entities. In 2014, the club opened the 93 million kr indoor venue Heimdalshallen.

The women's football team spent a single season in the top league, the 1988 First Division. In order to escape relegation, Heimdal needed to win their last match as well as Sandviken losing theirs. Both won, and Heimdal were relegated.

The men's football team enjoyed spells in the Third Division from 1994 to 1999, 2008 to 2010 and 2014 to 2016. The team appeared in the first round of the cup in 1991, only losing to Stjørdals-Blink in extra time.

The men's football team currently plays in the Fourth Division, the fifth tier of football in Norway. The women's team currently plays in the Fifth Division, the sixth tier.
