= Moelven IL =

Norwegian sports club

- Full name: Moelven Idrettslag
- Founded: 25 June 1918
- Ground: Moelv Idrettspark
- Coach: Kai Kristiansen
- League: Third Division
- 2011: Third Division/ 2, 5th
Home colours

Moelven Idrettslag is a Norwegian multi-sports club located in Moelv, Hedmark, founded on 25 June 1918 as Fotballgruppa Trygg. It has sections for athletics, handball, football, skiing and gymnastics.

The men's football team currently plays in the Third Division, the fourth tier of Norwegian football.

Among the prominent members of the athletics section are Jan Langøy and Mauritz Kåshagen.
