= Skedsmo FK =

Norwegian football club

Skedsmo
- Full name: Skedsmo Fotballklubb
- Founded: 1980
- Ground: Skedsmo stadion, Skedsmokorset
- Chairman: Kjell Ove Hansen
- Manager: Knut Aga JR
- League: Third Division
- 2024: Third Division group 5, 11th of 14
Home colours	Away colours

Skedsmo FK is a Norwegian football club from Skedsmokorset. It was founded in 1980, when the multi-sports club Skedsmo IF was split into several entities. The club colors are red and white.

The men's team currently resides in the Third Division (fourth tier), having previously won two promotions in a row. Notable former players include Torgeir Bjarmann, who spent his younger days in the club before joining Lillestrøm ahead of the 1988 season.

The women's football team last played in the Toppserien in 1991. One profiled player was Elin Krokan, and Tom Nordlie coached the team for a period. Skedsmo FK has not fielded a senior team for women since the 1993 season.

== Recent history ==
Season		Pos.	Pl.	W	D	L	GS	GA	P	Cup	Notes
2009	3. divisjon	4	26	15	3	8	81	51	48	First qualifying round	
2010	3. divisjon	6	26	13	5	8	68	48	44	First qualifying round	
2011	3. divisjon	5	26	13	6	7	57	40	45	First round	
2012	3. divisjon	↑ 1	26	22	2	4	92	35	62	First qualifying round	Promoted to the 2. divisjon
2013	2. divisjon	↓ 13	26	5	6	15	32	68	21	First round	Relegated to the 3. divisjon
