= Randi Leinan =

Norwegian footballer (born 1968)

Medal record

Representing Norway

Women's football

World championship
| Gold medal – first place | Sweden 1995 | Team |

Randi Leinan (9 April 1968) is a former Norwegian football player and World Champion.

She played on the Norwegian team that won the 1995 FIFA Women's World Cup in Sweden.

Having never played for youth national teams, she was capped 19 times and scored 8 goals between 1993 and 1997.
