= Athene Moss =

- Full name: Fotballklubben Athene Moss
- Founded: 27 December 1996
- Dissolved: 11 February 2011
- Ground: Melløs stadion, Moss
Home colours	Away colours

FK Athene Moss was a Norwegian women's football club from Moss. It is named after Athena in Greek mythology.

It was founded in 1996, replacing SK Sprint-Jeløy which was a former successful club from Moss. Athene Moss played in the Toppserien until 2001, when it was relegated. The club was later disbanded, but resurfaced on 1 January 2006, fielding teams on youth level.

Athene Moss and SK Rapid fielded a cooperative women-team in 2010, and on 11 February 2011 the two clubs merged to form Rapid Athene, and the old clubs ceased to exist.

During its first period of existence Athene Moss fielded such players as Heidi Støre, Agnete Carlsen, Birthe Hegstad, Bente Nordby, Marianne Pettersen and later national team players such as Ingvild Stensland, Lene Storløkken, Lise Klaveness, Camilla Huse and Christine Colombo Nilsen.
