= Verdal IL =

Norwegian sports club

- Full name: Verdal Idrettslag
- Founded: 12 December 1916; 109 years ago
- Ground: Verdal stadion, Verdalsøra
- Manager: Jann Rindsem
- League: 4. divisjon
- 2024: 3. divisjon group 4, 12th of 14 (relegated)
Home colours

Verdal Idrettslag is a Norwegian sports club from Verdalsøra, Nord-Trøndelag. It has sections for association football, team handball, weightlifting and speed skating.

It was established on 21 May 1920 as a merger between Værdalens SL, founded 12 December 1916, and FK Falken. The club counts 1916 as its founding year. In 1984 the track and field section formed its own club Verdal FIK.

== Football ==
The men's football team currently plays in the Fourth Division, the fifth tier of Norwegian football. It contested a playoff to win promotion to the First Division in 1996, but failed. It last played in the Second Division in 2002. It then won its Third Division group and contested playoffs to the Second Division in 2006 and 2007, but failed both times.

In 2011 they signed former Tippeliga player Trond Viggo Toresen from Levanger FK, he played a role as Playing Coach along with Head Coach Nils Petter Austad. He proved to be an important figure in the battle for promotion to Second Division, which ended in a 3rd place and no promotion.

The women's football team played in the Norwegian Premier League in 1996 and 1997. In December 2004 the women's section started a cooperation team in the region, named Verdal FK. This was later disclosed after little success and internal disputes.

=== Recent history ===
Season		Pos.	Pl.	W	D	L	GS	GA	P	Cup	Notes
2009	3. divisjon	2	22	18	2	2	74	25	56	First round	
2010	3. divisjon	6	22	12	1	9	56	47	37	First round	
2011	3. divisjon	3	26	16	5	5	59	25	53	Second round	
2012	3. divisjon	3	26	13	8	5	57	36	47	Second round	
2013	3. divisjon	3	26	14	6	6	55	35	48	Second qualifying round	
2014	3. divisjon	5	26	13	2	11	61	57	41	First round	
2015	3. divisjon	4	26	18	3	5	96	31	57	First qualifying round	
2016	3. divisjon	4	26	15	5	6	72	41	50	First qualifying round	
2017	3. divisjon	8	26	9	10	7	43	44	37	Second round	
2018	3. divisjon	5	26	10	7	9	31	37	37	Second qualifying round	
2019	3. divisjon	↓ 13	26	6	8	12	32	52	26	First round	Relegated to the 4. divisjon
2020	Season cancelled										
2021	4. divisjon	2	10	5	2	3	27	15	17	First round	
2022	4. divisjon	↑ 1	20	13	2	5	55	28	41	First round	Promoted to the 3. divisjon
2023	3. divisjon	11	26	8	3	15	34	51	27		
2024	3. divisjon	12	26	6	6	14	39	68	24		Relegated to the 4. divisjon
2025	4. divisjon	4	10	5	2	3	27	15	17		
2026	4. divisjon	6	10	5	2	3	27	15	17		
