= Asker SK =

Sports club in Asker, Norway

- Club logo
- Full name: Asker Skiklubb
- Sport: alpine skiing, cross-country skiing, ski jumping, association football, orienteering, ski orienteering, biathlon, track and field athletics, kayaking, volleyball
- Founded: 14 December 1889
- Based in: Asker, Norway

Asker Skiklubb is a sports club from Asker, Norway.

It was founded on 14 December 1889, and as the name suggests, was initially a cross-country skiing and ski jumping club. Today, however, many individuals (~5000 members) and teams participate in a wide variety of sports, winter and summer as well as sea- and land-based sports. These include—in addition to cross-country skiing and ski jumping—alpine skiing, track and field, orienteering, volleyball, football, handball, kayaking, and biathlon.

== Football ==
Its football section is one of Norway's largest, with the senior women's team annually contending for the national title for many years, until it was moved. The men's team plays in Adeccoligaen from 2011.

== Ski jumping ==
Asker was known for the ski jumper Georg Thrane in the postwar period. In modern times, Halvor Egner Granerud (born 1996) has been their most prominent jumper, having won the World Cup twice, the Four Hills tournament and being the Norwegian jumper with the most wins in individual World Cup races. Tom Hilde (born 1987) has multiple podiums in the Olympic Games, World Championships and the Four Hills tournament. His older brother Terje Hilde (born 1986) recorded two fourth places at the 2004 World Junior Championships. Vegard Swensen (born 1986) raced eleven times in the World Cup, collecting World Cup points in one of the races, a 22nd place in November 2012 in Lillehammer. Swensen also made the podium in the Continental Cup four times. Simen Key Grimsrud (born 1992) won a gold medal in the team competition at the 2012 Junior World Ski Championships. In four World Cup starts, he collected World Cup points twice, with a 28th place from Lillehammer in November 2012 as his best. He reached Continental Cup podiums twice.

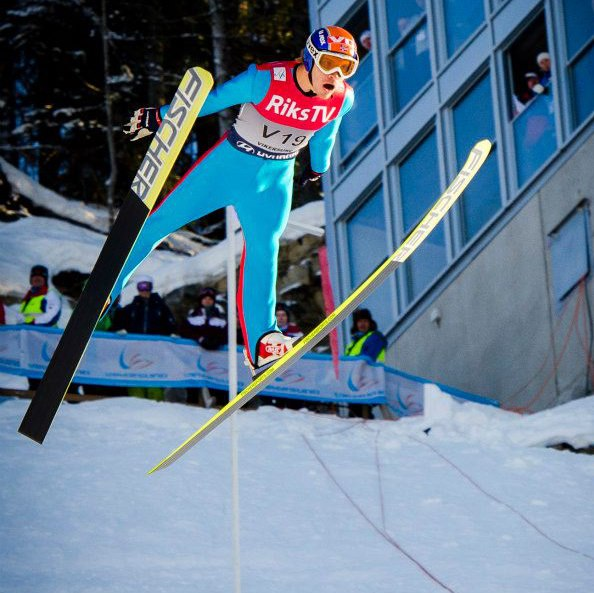
Simen Key Grimsrud, 2013.
