= IL Jardar =

Norwegian sports club

- Full name: Idrettslaget Jardar
- Founded: 4 June 1962
- Ground: Football: Bjørnegård; Handball: Combihallen; Ski jump: Jardarkollen

IL Jardar Fotball
Home colours

Idrettslaget Jardar is a Norwegian sports club from Bærum, Akershus. It covers the areas Slependen, Jong and Tanum.

Sports clubs in the area before World War II were Tanum IL, and minor clubs such as Jongsåsen IF, Pil and Uredd. IL Jardar was founded as a children's sports club on 4 June 1962. It now has sections for association football, team handball and Nordic skiing (cross-country skiing and ski jumping). The clubroom was opened on 9 November 1983.

The women's football team was the club's flagship with many seasons in the Norwegian Women's Premier League. It also reached the semi-finals of the Norwegian Cup in 1986 and 1989. It did not play in the inaugural season of a nationwide league ("First Division") in 1987, but was promoted from the Second Division through playoff. In the 1990 First Division Jardar ended last, losing all away games, and was relegated. Jan Erik Aalbu was hired as the new coach. After re-promotion in 1991, the team ultimately left the highest tier when ending last in the 1993 First Division, again losing all away games. Ellen Scheel Aalbu, married to coach Aalbu, was a well-known club player with 32 caps. Torill Hoch-Nielsen had 39 caps. Other international players include Birthe Hegstad and Reidun Seth. Scheel represented the club in the 1991 FIFA Women's World Cup.

The women's team played at Nadderud stadion while on a national level. Jardar's home field is now Bjørnegård, with artificial grass from 2009. The women's team last participated in the Fourth Division, the fifth tier of Norwegian football, in 2010 as a cooperation team between northern neighbors IL Jutul and Bærums Verk IF. The men's football team currently plays in the Fourth Division, the fifth tier. In later years it has been coached by Eirik Markegård and Mads Clausen, notable footballers in their own right. Clausen has also played for the club.

Members of the skiing section include Nordic combined skier Ansgar Danielsen, and ski jumper Andreas Vilberg. Live Frisak has jumped in the Women's Continental Cup, and in 2004 IL Jardar won a gender equality prize from Akershus County Municipality. The club had a ski jumping hill from the start, as Staverkollen was built in 1961–1962. The name was changed to Jardarkollen. The club had a slope for cross-country skiing between 1970 and 1986; it was lost because of residential building.
