= Bøler IF =

Norwegian sports club

- Full name: Bøler Idrettsforening
- Founded: 24 October 1958
- Ground: Haraløkka, Oslo
- League: Third Division
- 2012: Third Division/ 2, 9th
Home colours	Away colours

Bøler Idrettsforening is a Norwegian sports club from Bøler, Østensjø, Oslo. It has sections for association football, team handball, track and field and tennis. It formerly had a section for Nordic skiing.

It was founded on 24 October 1958. The club colors are yellow and blue.

The women's football team was a part of the inaugural Norwegian Premier League for women in 1987. The team stayed here until 1997, when relegation took place. A women's team currently does not exist.

The men's football team currently plays in the Third Division, the fourth tier of Norwegian football. Its current stint in the Third Division runs from 2006. Well-known players include Kjell Roar Kaasa, Øyvind Bolthof and Dan Alberto Fellus.

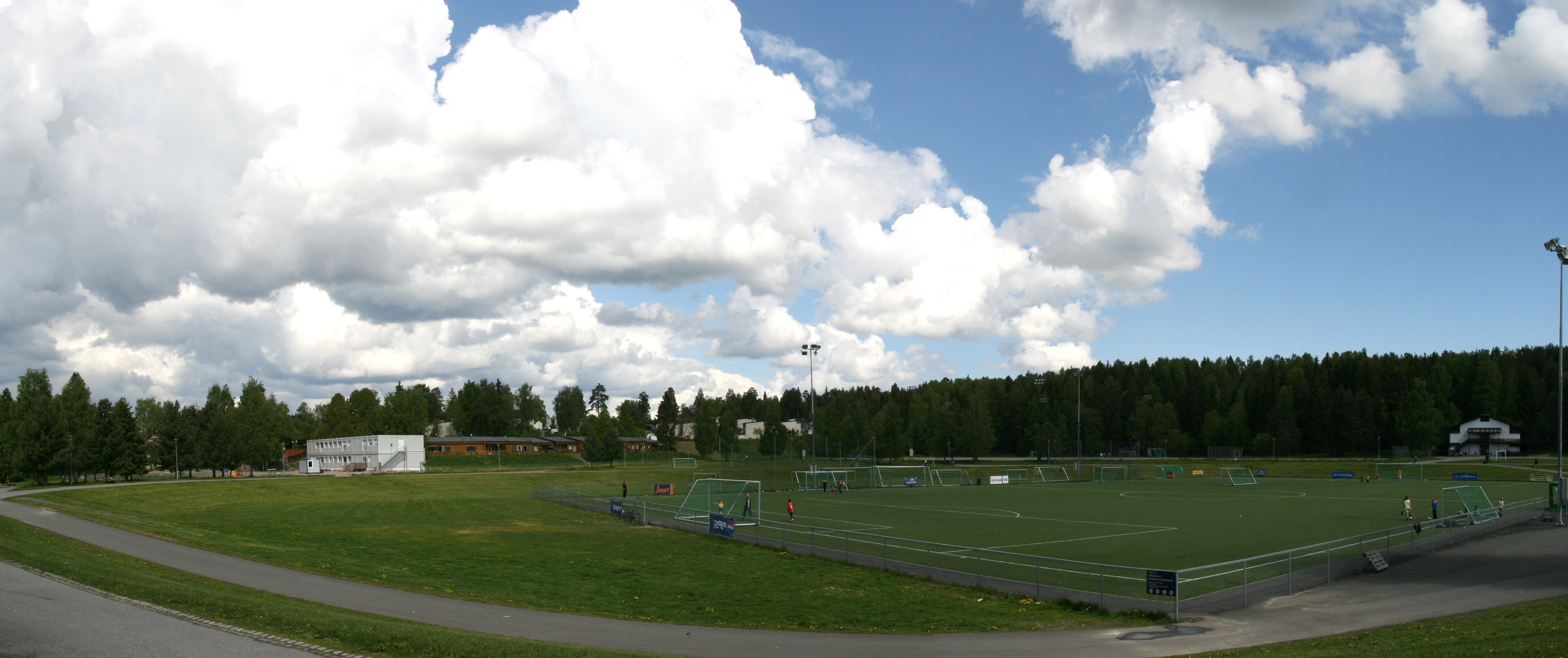
Haraløkka, its home field.
