= Rosenborg BK (women) =

Norwegian football club

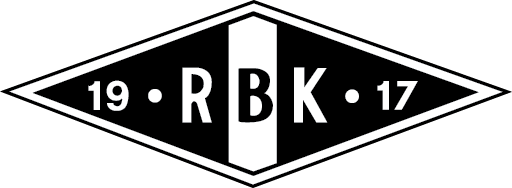
- Full name: Rosenborg Ballklub
- Founded: 18 May 1917; 109 years ago; as SK Trondheims-Ørn
- Ground: Koteng Arena, Trondheim
- Head coach: Robin Shroot
- League: Toppserien
- 2026: Toppserien, 3rd
- Website: rbk-kvinner.no
Home colours	Away colours	Third colours

Rosenborg Ballklub Kvinner (previously known as Sportsklubben Trondheims-Ørn) is a Norwegian women's professional football club in Trondheim, Trøndelag.

== History ==
The club was founded as a multi-sports club on 18 May 1917, and became a member of the Workers' Sports Federation in the 1920s. It was first based in Lademoen and had a clubhouse at Buran between 1946 and the 1960s. It had sections for men's football, Nordic skiing, speed skating, track and field, and swimming. Team handball followed in 1952, and ice hockey in 1961. The women's football section was established in 1972, twelve years before a national league was organized. The men's football team and all other sports were discontinued in 1984, so that only the women's football section survived.

Rosenborg Kvinner has won the Toppserien seven times, which is a record tied with LSK Kvinner. It also holds a record eight cup championships. It has also won the Nordic champions cup once.

In February 2020, the club merged with the men's football club Rosenborg BK and the name was changed from SK Trondheims-Ørn to Rosenborg BK Kvinner.

== Honours ==
- Toppserien

Winners (7): 1994, 1995, 1996, 1997, 2000, 2001, 2003
Runners-up (9): 1984, 1993, 1998, 1999, 2004, 2006, 2020, 2021, 2023

- Norwegian Cup

Winners (9): 1993, 1994, 1996, 1997, 1998, 1999, 2001, 2002, 2023
Runners-up (9): 1978, 1980, 1986, 1989, 1995, 2010, 2014, 2024, 2025

== Recent seasons ==
Season		Pos.	Pl.	W	D	L	GS	GA	P	Cup	Notes
2005	TS	4	18	10	3	5	31	17	33	Quarter-final	
2006	TS	2	18	13	3	2	47	10	42	Semi-final	
2007	TS	6	22	9	3	10	38	38	30	3rd round	
2008	TS	9	22	6	5	11	26	38	23	3rd round	
2009	TS	6	22	9	4	9	37	41	31	Semi-final	
2010	TS	5	22	12	2	8	34	29	38	Final	
2011	TS	6	22	11	2	9	45	41	35	Semi-final	
2012	TS	9	22	6	3	13	29	50	22	Quarter-final	
2013	TS	7	22	9	3	10	39	49	30	3rd round	
2014	TS	8	22	7	6	9	33	37	27	Final	
2015	TS	8	22	7	3	12	27	38	24	Semi-final	
2016	TS	7	22	7	6	9	34	41	27	Semi-final	
2017	TS	8	22	8	6	8	36	36	30	Quarter-final	
2018	TS	10	22	4	6	12	25	48	18	Quarter-final	
2019	TS	7	22	8	5	9	26	22	29	Semi-final	
2020	TS	2	18	10	8	0	34	16	38	Quarter-final	
2021	TS	2	18	16	0	2	42	15	48	Semi-final	
2022	TS	3	18	13	2	3	40	12	41	Semi-final	
2022	TS	3	6	2	1	3	7	8	11	Semi-final	
2023	TS	2	27	18	5	4	57	15	58	Winners	
2024	TS	3	27	15	1	11	38	32	46	Final	
2025	TS	3	27	18	4	5	63	26	58	Final	
2026	TS	3	22	14	6	2	44	21	48	3rd round	

== First-team squad ==
As of 9 January 2025

Note: Flags indicate national team as defined under FIFA eligibility rules; some limited exceptions apply. Players may hold more than one non-FIFA nationality.

No.	Pos.	Nation	Player
1	GK	NOR	Rugile Maria Rulyte
2	DF	NOR	Kristine Bjørdal Leine
3	DF	NOR	Mali Lilleås Næss
4	DF	NOR	Synne Aunehagen
5	MF	NOR	Cesilie Andreassen
6	MF	NOR	Elin Sørum
7	FW	NOR	Matilde Rogde
10	FW	NOR	Camilla Linberg
12	GK	DEN	Lene Christensen
15	MF	DEN	Beate Marcussen
16	FW	NOR	Ine Berre
17	MF	NOR	Kristine Minde
18	MF	NOR	Synne Brønstad

No.	Pos.	Nation	Player
19	FW	NOR	Rebecka Holum
20	DF	NOR	Hanna Dahl
21	GK	NOR	Karen Oline Sneve
22	FW	NOR	Cille Nilsen
23	MF	NOR	Karna Sødahl
24	GK	NOR	Siri Ervik
25	DF	NOR	Andrine Tomter
27	MF	ISL	Selma Sól Magnúsdóttir
28	MF	NOR	Vilde Grøseth
31	MF	NOR	Andrea Buberg
—	MF	NOR	Oline Brekke Fuglum
—	FW	NOR	Eivor Ulvund
