= IK Grand Bodø =

Norwegian football club

- Full name: Idrettsklubben Grand Bodø
- Founded: 12 April 1917; 109 years ago
- Ground: Aspmyra stadion, Bodø
- Manager: Cato André Hansen (women)
- League: 1. divisjon (women); Fourth Division (men)
- 2019: 1. divisjon 8th (women) (relegated); Fourth Division / Nordland, 8th (men)
| Home colours | Away colours |

Idrettsklubben Grand Bodø is a Norwegian association football club from Bodø, Nordland. It was founded on 12 April 1917.

== Football ==
Former Liverpool and England international full-back Chris Lawler was player-coach for the club in 1981.

Its women's team was a mainstay in Toppserien for many years, and won bronze in 1986, but has not played there since the 2007 season.

The men's football team currently plays in the Fourth Division, the fifth tier of Norwegian football, but played in the Third Division as late as 2010.

The women's club was taken over by FK Bodø/Glimt ahead of the 2024 season, while another women's team was retained in third division.

== Seasons ==
| Season | | Pos. | Pl. | W | D | L | GS | GA | P | Cup | Notes |
|---|---|---|---|---|---|---|---|---|---|---|---|
| 2005 | D1 | 3 | 18 | 9 | 5 | 4 | 45 | 28 | 32 | 2nd round | |
| 2006 | D1 | ↑ 3 | 18 | 9 | 4 | 5 | 28 | 39 | 31 | 3rd round | Promoted |
| 2007 | TS | 12 | 22 | 2 | 2 | 18 | 19 | 63 | 8 | 2nd round | Relegated |
| 2008 | D1 | 6 | 18 | 6 | 6 | 6 | 37 | 30 | 24 | 3rd round | |
| 2009 | D1 | 7 | 22 | 9 | 4 | 9 | 53 | 55 | 31 | 2nd round | |
| 2010 | D1 | 9 | 22 | 7 | 3 | 12 | 40 | 46 | 24 | 2nd round | |
| 2011 | D1 | 4 | 20 | 9 | 6 | 5 | 44 | 31 | 33 | 3rd round | |
| 2012 | D1 | 5 | 22 | 11 | 3 | 8 | 64 | 37 | 36 | 2nd round | |
| 2013 | D1 | 1 | 20 | 16 | 1 | 3 | 73 | 23 | 49 | 2nd round | Promoted |
| 2014 | TS | 12 | 22 | 1 | 4 | 17 | 15 | 71 | 7 | 2nd round | Relegated |
| 2015 | D1 | 2 | 22 | 14 | 5 | 3 | 51 | 23 | 47 | 3rd round | |
| 2016 | D1 | 1 | 22 | 18 | 3 | 1 | 82 | 16 | 57 | 3rd round | Promoted |
| 2017 | TS | 11 | 22 | 2 | 2 | 18 | 30 | 80 | 8 | Quarter-final | |
| 2018 | TS | 12 | 22 | 2 | 2 | 18 | 20 | 61 | 8 | 3rd round | Relegated |
| 2019 | D1 | 8 | 22 | 8 | 3 | 11 | 34 | 45 | 27 | 3rd round | Relegated through play-offs |

== Athletics ==
The club was formerly active in athletics. One Norwegian champion has represented Grand; Einar Hernes who won the 110 metres hurdles in 1980. He also took silver medals in 1976, 1981 and 1982 and a bronze medal in 1978. In the 200 metres he won a silver medal in 1980 and a bronze in 1981. Hans Petter Pedersen won a 100 metres silver in 1953, in the 800 metres Jens Chr. Berge won a silver in 1962 and Dagfinn Kleppe a bronze in 1970, Henry Johansen won 200 metres bronzes in 1945 and 1946, and Reidar Nilsen won a 400 metres hurdles bronze in 1955.

The club also arranged the national championships in forest cross-country running in 1951, and then the Main Championships in 1980 at Aspmyra stadion. From 1983 the club entered a cooperation around the new club Bodø FIK.
