= SK Sprint-Jeløy =

Norwegian football club

- Full name: Sportsklubben Sprint-Jeløy
- Founded: 1926
- Ground: Bellevue; Moss
- League: 4. divisjon
- 2024: 3. divisjon group 6, 12th of 14 (relegated)
Home colours	Away colours

Sportsklubben Sprint-Jeløy is a Norwegian football club from Jeløya in Moss. The club was founded in 1926 when both Jeløy IF and SK Sprint was formed. The two clubs merged into Sportsklubben Sprint-Jeløy on 11 October 1940.

The women's team is one of Norway's most successful teams, with 4 Toppserien-titles and 4 Norwegian Women's Cup titles. In 1997, Sprint-Jeløy's women's team became defunct and was replaced by FK Athene Moss.

Then men's team played at the top tier in 1947–48, and is today playing in the Fourth Division after being relegated from the Third Division in 2024.
