= 2018 Norwegian Fourth Division =

4. divisjon
- Season: 2018

The 2018 season of the 4. divisjon, the fifth highest association football league for men in Norway.

Between 22 and 26 games (depending on group size) are played in 24 groups, with 3 points given for wins and 1 for draws.

== Teams ==
Group 1

1. Sarpsborg 08 2 − promoted
2. Sprint-Jeløy
3. Fredrikstad 2
4. Råde
5. Borgen
6. Rakkestad
7. Sparta Sarpsborg
8. Kråkerøy 2
9. Ås
10. Idd
11. Sarpsborg
12. Borgar − relegated
13. Tistedalen − relegated
14. Askim − relegated

Group 2

1. Årvoll − promoted
2. Kjelsås 2
3. Lommedalen
4. Heggedal
5. Christiania
6. Skeid 2
7. Asker 2
8. Holmen
9. Vollen
10. Hasle-Løren
11. Frigg 2 − relegated

- Røa − pulled team

Group 3

1. Nordstrand − promoted
2. Manglerud Star
3. Heming
4. Oslojuvelene
5. Fagerborg
6. Lyn 2
7. Ullern 2
8. Bærum 2
9. Furuset
10. Majorstuen
11. Romsås − relegated
12. Øvrevoll Hosle − relegated

Group 4

1. Rommen − promoted
2. Kolbotn
3. Holmlia
4. Grorud 2
5. Oppsal 2
6. Nesodden
7. Vestli
8. Ski
9. Follo 2
10. Fremad Famagusta
11. Oslo City
12. Fortuna Oslo − relegated

Group 5

1. Ull/Kisa 2 – promoted
2. Fu/Vo
3. Aurskog-Høland
4. Kløfta
5. Blaker
6. Rælingen
7. Eidsvold
8. Strømmen 2
9. Sørumsand
10. Eidsvold Turn 2
11. Raumnes & Årnes
12. Fet
13. Hauerseter − relegated
14. Skedsmo 2 − relegated

Group 6

1. Raufoss 2 – promoted
2. Gran
3. Toten
4. Kolbukameratene
5. Storhamar
6. Redalen
7. MBK Domkirkeodden
8. Brumunddal 2
9. Moelven
10. Gjøvik-Lyn 2
11. Søndre Land – relegated
12. Nordre Land – relegated

Group 7

1. Kongsvinger 2 – promoted
2. Lillehammer
3. Ham-Kam 2
4. Sander
5. Faaberg
6. Trysil
7. Furnes
8. Engerdal
9. Flisa
10. Eidskog
11. Follebu
12. Ridabu

Group 8

1. Mjøndalen 2 – promoted
2. Modum
3. Drammens BK
4. Jevnaker
5. Kongsberg
6. Hallingdal
7. Konnerud
8. Åssiden 2 – relegated
9. Svelvik
10. Solberg
11. Holeværingen
12. Steinberg
13. Huringen
14. Slemmestad – relegated

Group 9

1. Flint – promoted
2. Eik Tønsberg
3. Teie
4. FK Tønsberg 2
5. Runar
6. Re
7. Ørn-Horten 2
8. Larvik Turn
9. Husøy & Foynland
10. Falk/Borre (without Falk in 2019)
11. Tønsberg FK − relegated

- Fram 2 - pulled team
- Nanset - pulled team

Group 10

1. Storm – promoted
2. Odd 3
3. Hei
4. Skarphedin
5. Tollnes
6. Notodden 2
7. Pors 2
8. Stathelle og Omegn
9. Herkules
10. Ulefoss (cooperation team with Skade in 2019)
11. Skade (cooperation team with Ulefoss in 2019)

- Kjapp/Gvarv – pulled team

Group 11

1. Mandalskameratene – promoted
2. Lyngdal
3. Våg
4. Fløy 2
5. Flekkefjord
6. Vigør
7. Express
8. Jerv 2
9. Søgne
10. Arendal 2
11. Randesund
12. Kvinesdal
13. Vindbjart 2 – relegated
14. Donn 2 – relegated

Group 12

1. Bryne 2 – promoted
2. Varhaug
3. Riska
4. Eiger
5. Frøyland
6. Ålgård
7. Midtbygden
8. Klepp
9. Lura
10. Vaulen
11. Nærbø
12. Sola 2
13. Bogafjell – relegated
14. Moi – relegated

Group 13

1. Djerv 1919 – promoted
2. Åkra
3. Haugesund 2
4. Hinna
5. Sandnes Ulf 2
6. Voll
7. Kopervik
8. Vidar 2
9. Skjold
10. Randaberg
11. Hana
12. Hundvåg
13. Rosseland – relegated
14. Vedavåg Karmøy – relegated

Group 14

1. Os – promoted
2. Lyngbø
3. Sandviken
4. Frøya
5. Fyllingsdalen 2
6. Loddefjord
7. Sund
8. Vestsiden-Askøy
9. NHH
10. Valestrand Hjellvik – relegated
11. Austevoll – relegated
12. Telavåg – relegated

Group 15

1. Bergen Nord – promoted
2. Arna-Bjørnar
3. Åsane 2
4. Gneist
5. Trio
6. Trott
7. Bjarg
8. Solid
9. Odda – relegated
10. Ny-Krohnborg – relegated
11. Fana 2 – relegated
12. Nordhordland – relegated

Group 16

1. Fjøra − promoted
2. Eid
3. Stryn
4. Studentspretten
5. Kaupanger
6. Årdal
7. Florø 2
8. Dale
9. Tornado Måløy
10. Bremanger
11. Vik − relegated
12. Skavøypoll − relegated

Group 17

1. Aalesund 2 − promoted
2. Bergsøy
3. Emblem
4. Volda
5. Rollon
6. SIF/Hessa
7. Ørsta
8. Valder
9. Larsnes/Gursken
10. Hareid
11. Sykkylven − relegated
12. Godøy − relegated

Group 18

1. Sunndal − promoted
2. Eide og Omegn
3. Tomrefjord
4. Surnadal
5. Åndalsnes
6. Averøykameratene
7. Kristiansund FK
8. Vestnes Varfjell
9. Midsund
10. Malmefjorden/Ekko/Aureosen (without Ekko in 2019)
11. Elnesvågen og Omegn
12. Træff 2 − relegated

Group 19

1. Ranheim 2 − promoted
2. Trygg/Lade
3. Namsos
4. Rørvik
5. Heimdal
6. Byåsen 2
7. Sverresborg
8. Stjørdals-Blink 2
9. Vuku
10. Ørland
11. Neset − relegated
12. Vestbyen − relegated

Group 20

1. Strindheim − promoted
2. NTNUI
3. Orkla 2
4. Kvik
5. Nardo 2
6. Hitra
7. Charlottenlund
8. Meldal
9. KIL/Hemne
10. Røros
11. Tydal − relegated
12. Støren − relegated

Group 21

1. Bodø/Glimt 2 − promoted
2. Mosjøen
3. Mo − merged with Stålkameratene post-season
4. Fauske/Sprint
5. Sandnessjøen
6. Brønnøysund
7. Innstranden
8. Grand Bodø
9. Åga

Group 22

1. Leknes − promoted
2. Morild
3. Skånland
4. Medkila
5. Landsås
6. Mjølner 2 − discontinued
7. Lofoten
8. Svolvær
9. Ballstad
10. Stålbrott/Sortland 2 − relegated
11. Grovfjord/Harstad 2 − split post-season
12. Andenes

Group 23

1. Tromsø 2 − promoted
2. Krokelvdalen
3. Tromsdalen 2
4. Finnsnes 2
5. Nordkjosbotn
6. Bardufoss og Omegn
7. Lyngen/Karnes
8. Salangen
9. Stakkevollan
10. Storelva
11. Ishavsbyen
12. Nordreisa − relegated

Group 24

1. Norild − promoted
2. Porsanger
3. Kirkenes
4. Tverrelvdalen
5. Alta 2
6. HIF/Stein
7. Sørøy Glimt
8. Bossekop
9. Nordlys
10. Honningsvåg
11. Indrefjord
12. Kautokeino − relegated
