= 1994 Norwegian Third Division =

Norwegian football league season

The 1994 season of the 3. divisjon, the fourth highest association football league for men in Norway.

Between 22 and 24 games (depending on group size) were played in 19 groups, with 3 points given for wins and 1 for draws. All group winners were promoted to the 2. divisjon.

== Tables ==
Group 1

1. Rakkestad – promoted
2. Kongsvinger 2
3. Rygge
4. Trøgstad/Båstad
5. Østsiden
6. Galterud
7. Nes
8. Rælingen
9. Torp
10. Hafslund – relegated
11. Løvenstad – relegated
12. Eidskog – relegated

Group 2

1. Skjetten – promoted
2. Nordstrand
3. Lisleby
4. Bækkelaget
5. Tune
6. Kolbotn
7. Kvik Halden
8. Tistedalen
9. Greåker
10. Høland – relegated
11. Bjørkelangen – relegated
12. Bøler – relegated

Group 3

1. Eidsvold Turn – promoted
2. Grei
3. Stovnerkameratene
4. Gjøvik-Lyn
5. Lillehammer FK
6. Grorud
7. Gjelleråsen
8. Eidsvold IF
9. Vardal
10. Ull-Kisa – relegated
11. Nordre Land – relegated
12. Kløfta – relegated

Group 4

1. Ham-Kam 2 – promoted
2. Vang
3. Sel
4. Fart
5. Raufoss
6. Biri
7. Brumunddal
8. Ottestad
9. Vinstra
10. Stange – relegated
11. Gran – relegated
12. Rena – relegated

Group 5

1. Liv/Fossekallen – promoted
2. Årvoll
3. Drafn
4. Frigg
5. Teie
6. Slemmestad
7. Flint
8. Vålerenga 2
9. Holmestrand
10. Ready – relegated
11. Lier – relegated
12. Bygdø – relegated

Group 6

1. Vigør – promoted
2. Kvinesdal
3. Vindbjart
4. Donn
5. Larvik Turn
6. Tjølling
7. Langesund
8. Drangedal
9. Gjekstad & Østerøya
10. Grim – relegated
11. Kragerø – relegated
12. Store Bergan – relegated

Group 7

1. Øyestad – promoted
2. Snøgg
3. Sørfjell
4. Jerv
5. Urædd
6. Skotfoss
7. Strømsgodset 2
8. Vikersund
9. Gulset
10. Steinberg – relegated
11. Rygene – relegated
12. Solberg – relegated

Group 8

1. Randaberg – promoted
2. Eiger
3. Stavanger
4. Sola
5. Mosterøy
6. Nærbø
7. Figgjo
8. Buøy
9. Staal
10. Varhaug
11. Egersund – relegated
12. Vardeneset – relegated

Group 9

1. Nord – promoted
2. Stord
3. Åkra
4. Bergen Sparta
5. Odda
6. Telavåg
7. Skjold
8. Trott
9. Follese
10. Lyngbø
11. Solid – relegated
12. Bremnes – relegated

Group 10

1. Nest – promoted
2. Florvåg
3. Varegg
4. Hovding
5. Løv-Ham
6. Bjarg
7. Nymark
8. Vadmyra
9. Sandviken
10. Radøy – relegated
11. Austrheim – relegated
12. Hardy – relegated

Group 11

1. Sogndal 2 – promoted
2. Stryn
3. Jotun
4. Tornado
5. Førde
6. Jølster
7. Høyang
8. Eid
9. Måløy
10. Fjøra
11. Eikefjord
12. Tempo – relegated

Group 12

1. Skarbøvik – promoted
2. Brattvåg
3. Sykkylven
4. Valder
5. Hareid
6. Aksla
7. Åram
8. Stordal
9. Spjelkavik
10. Stranda – relegated
11. Skodje – relegated
12. Hessa – relegated

Group 13

1. Kristiansund – promoted
2. Averøykameratene
3. Bryn
4. Tomrefjord
5. Molde 2
6. Surnadal
7. Træff
8. Moldekameratene
9. Isfjorden
10. Rival – relegated
11. Braatt – relegated
12. Midsund – relegated

Group 14

1. Orkanger – promoted
2. Hitra
3. Ranheim
4. KIL/Hemne
5. Røros
6. Nationalkameratene
7. Brekken
8. Heimdal
9. NTHI – relegated
10. Sverresborg – relegated
11. Alvdal – relegated
12. Freidig – relegated

Group 15

1. Fram – promoted
2. Sverre
3. Rissa
4. Kvamskameratene
5. Vuku
6. Fosen
7. Vikingan
8. Nessegutten
9. Tranabakkan
10. Henning – relegated
11. Vinne – relegated
12. Ørland – relegated

Group 16

1. Fauske/Sprint – promoted
2. Bodø/Glimt 2
3. Mosjøen
4. Grand Bodø
5. Sandnesssjøen
6. Bodøkameratene
7. Saltdalkameratene
8. Halsakameratene
9. Åga
10. Sørfold
11. Brønnøysund
12. Nesna
13. Olderskog – relegated

Group 17

1. Lofoten – promoted
2. Leknes
3. Vågakameratene
4. Kvæfjord
5. Stokmarknes
6. Morild
7. Skånland
8. Landsås
9. Ajaks
10. Beisfjord
11. Luna– relegated
12. Andenes– relegated

Group 18

1. Skjervøy – promoted
2. Finnsnes
3. Tromsdalen 2
4. Balsfjord
5. Ulfstind
6. Fløya
7. Salangen
8. Ramfjord
9. Kåfjord
10. Ringvassøy
11. Mellembygd
12. Ullsfjord – relegated
13. Kvaløysletta – relegated

Group 19

1. Honningsvåg – promoted
2. Bjørnevatn
3. Polarstjernen
4. HIF/Stein
5. Nordlys
6. Kirkenes
7. Lakselv
8. Bossekop
9. Indrefjord – relegated
10. Nordkinn
11. Vardø – relegated
12. Bølgen
