= 1992 Norwegian Third Division =

Norwegian football league season

The 3. divisjon is the fourth highest association football league for men in Norway. In the 1992 season of the 3. divisjon, 22 games were played in 19 groups, with 3 points given for wins and 1 for draws. All group winners were promoted to the 2. divisjon.

== Tables ==
Group 1

1. Selbak – promoted
2. Østsiden
3. Borgen
4. Lisleby
5. Skjetten
6. Rælingen
7. Kvik Halden
8. Torp
9. Gjelleråsen
10. Abildsø – relegated
11. Bøler – relegated
12. Fet – relegated

Group 2

1. Galterud – promoted
2. Høland
3. Aurskog-Finstadbru
4. Bjørkelangen
5. Eidskog
6. Askim
7. Greåker
8. Tune
9. Rakkestad
10. Gran
11. Kongsvinger 2 – relegated
12. Rapid – relegated

Group 3

1. Lyn 2 – promoted
2. Raufoss
3. Gjøvik-Lyn
4. Lom
5. Nordre Land
6. Sel
7. Nordstrand
8. Bygdø
9. Gjøvik Sport – relegated
10. Skreia
11. Hosle – relegated
12. Vestli – relegated

Group 4

1. Eidsvold Turn – promoted
2. Holter
3. Ham-Kam 2
4. Lillehammer FK
5. Vang
6. Brumunddal
7. Stange
8. Nes
9. Moelven
10. Trysil – relegated
11. Vind – relegated
12. Gjerdrum – relegated

Group 5

1. Runar – promoted
2. Stovnerkameratene
3. ROS
4. Holmestrand
5. Slemmestad
6. KFUM Oslo
7. Slagen
8. Steinberg
9. Strømsgodset 2 – relegated
10. Borre – relegated
11. Vollen – relegated
12. Stokke – relegated

Group 6

1. Jevnaker – promoted
2. Liv/Fossekallen
3. Larvik Turn
4. Tønsberg FK
5. Mjøndalen 2
6. Teie
7. Drafn
8. Snøgg
9. Skotfoss
10. Birkebeineren – relegated
11. Flint – relegated
12. Rjukan – relegated

Group 7

1. Flekkefjord – promoted
2. Kvinesdal
3. Vigør
4. Vindbjart
5. Gulset
6. Urædd
7. Grane
8. Sørfjell
9. Tollnes
10. Langesund
11. Store Bergan – relegated
12. Lyngdal – relegated – relegated

Group 8

1. Egersund – promoted
2. Figgjo
3. Randaberg
4. Eiger
5. Staal
6. Sola
7. Hana
8. Bjerkreim
9. Sunde
10. Ganddal – relegated
11. Stavanger – relegated
12. Buøy – relegated

Group 9

1. Vedavåg – promoted
2. Nord
3. Åkra
4. Kopervik
5. Skjold
6. Bjørnar
7. Solid
8. Trio
9. Varhaug
10. Madla – relegated
11. Eidsvåg – relegated
12. Odda – relegated

Group 10

1. Florvåg – promoted
2. Radøy
3. Voss
4. Follese
5. Bergen Nord
6. Hardy
7. Telavåg
8. Øygard
9. Nest
10. Bjarg – relegated
11. Ask – relegated
12. Minde – relegated

Group 11

1. Sogndal 2 – promoted
2. Stryn
3. Florø
4. Fjøra
5. Høyang
6. Sandane
7. Jotun
8. Førde
9. Eid
10. Vikane
11. Kaupanger – relegated
12. Vik – relegated

Group 12

1. Ørsta – promoted
2. Langevåg
3. Valder
4. Brattvåg
5. Stordal
6. Sykkylven
7. Åram
8. Skodje
9. Spjelkavik – relegated
10. Bergsøy – relegated
11. Herd – relegated
12. Vigra – relegated

Group 13

1. Sunndal – promoted
2. Molde 2
3. Clausenengen
4. Isfjorden
5. Rival
6. Træff
7. Kvass
8. Tomrefjord
9. Bryn
10. Bud – relegated
11. Goma – relegated
12. Fræna/Elnesvågen – relegated

Group 14

1. Kolstad – promoted
2. Orkanger
3. Ørland
4. Freidig
5. NTHI
6. HIL/Fevåg
7. Nationalkameratene
8. Rissa
9. Tynset
10. Flå – relegated
11. Oppdal – relegated
12. Nidelv – relegated

Group 15

1. Nessegutten – promoted
2. Sparbu
3. Verdal
4. Fram
5. Sverre
6. Ranheim
7. Vinne
8. Vanvik
9. Skogn
10. Bangsund – relegated
11. Varden – relegated
12. Neset – relegated

Group 16

1. Fauske/Sprint – promoted
2. Mo/Bossmo
3. Mosjøen
4. Saltdalkameratene
5. Olderskog
6. Sørfold
7. Grand Bodø
8. Korgen
9. Halsakameratene
10. Brønnøysund
11. Innstranden – relegated
12. Ørnes – relegated

Group 17

1. Harstad – promoted
2. Svolvær (-> FK Lofoten)
3. Vågakameratene
4. Landsås
5. Andenes
6. Morild
7. Kabelvåg
8. Ajaks
9. Stokmarknes
10. Luna
11. Hardhaus – relegated
12. Melbo – relegated

Group 18

1. Tromsø 2 – promoted
2. Finnsnes
3. Skjervøy
4. Silsand
5. Salangen
6. Ramfjord
7. Fløya
8. Kvaløysletta
9. Kåfjord
10. Ullsfjord
11. Nordkjosbotn – relegated
12. Bardu – relegated

Group 19

1. Polarstjernen – promoted
2. Vardø
3. Kautokeino
4. Norild
5. Lakselv
6. Nordkyn (-> FK Nordkinn)
7. Bjørnevatn
8. HIF/Stein
9. Porsanger – relegated
10. Bølgen
11. Tverrelvdalen
12. Rafsbotn – relegated
