= 2019 Norwegian Fourth Division =

4. divisjon
- Season: 2019

The 2019 season of the 4. divisjon, the fifth highest association football league for men in Norway.

Between 16 and 26 games (depending on group size) are played in 24 groups, with 3 points given for wins and 1 for draws.

According to a proposal at the 2018 Football Convention, fewer teams would be relegated from the 2019 3. divisjon to the 2020 4. divisjon, and accordingly, fewer teams would be promoted. The groups affected would be the group 1 and 9 winners who would contest a single promotion spot; the group 2–4 winners who would contest two promotion spots; the group 6 and 7 winners who would contest a single promotion spot; the group 8 and 10 winners who would contest a single promotion spot; the group 17 and 18 winners who would contest a single promotion spot; and the group 21 and 22 winners who would contest a single promotion spot. The playoff between the group 21 and 22 winners was cancelled.

Incidentally, the 2020 4. divisjon was cancelled before commencing because of the COVID-19 pandemic in Norway, so the promotions and relegations first came into effect in the 2021 4. divisjon.

== Teams ==
Group 1

1. Fredrikstad 2 − promoted
2. Kvik Halden 2
3. Sprint-Jeløy
4. Råde
5. Østsiden
6. Borgen
7. Moss 2
8. Kråkerøy 2
9. Selbak
10. Sarpsborg
11. Ås
12. Rakkestad
13. Idd − relegated
14. Sparta Sarpsborg − relegated

Group 2

1. Nesodden − lost playoff
2. Oppsal 2
3. Sagene
4. Ullern 2
5. Majorstuen
6. Manglerud Star
7. Heggedal (merged with Vollen post-season)
8. Lommedalen
9. Follo 2
10. Holmen
11. Korsvoll − relegated
12. Oslo City − relegated

Group 3

1. Grorud 2 − promoted
2. KFUM 2
3. Oslojuvelene
4. Vollen (merged with Heggedal post-season)
5. Kolbotn
6. Stabæk 3
7. Asker 2
8. Holmlia
9. Lyn 2
10. Furuset − relegated
11. Hasle-Løren − relegated

- Langhus (evicted)

Group 4

1. Skeid 2 − promoted
2. Rilindja
3. Heming
4. Kjelsås 2
5. Bærum 2
6. Christiania
7. Fagerborg
8. Fremad Famagusta
9. Ready 2
10. Ski − relegated
11. Vestli (merged with Rommen post-season)
12. Wam-Kam − relegated

Group 5

1. Fu/Vo – promoted
2. Skedsmo
3. Kløfta
4. Blaker
5. Eidsvold
6. Aurskog-Høland
7. Sørumsand
8. Lørenskog 2
9. Fjellhamar
10. Raumnes & Årnes
11. Strømmen 2
12. Eidsvold Turn 2
13. Fet – relegated
14. Rælingen – relegated

Group 6

1. Toten – promoted
2. Løten
3. Kolbukameratene
4. Gran
5. Reinsvoll
6. Furnes
7. Sander
8. Eidskog – relegated
9. Ridabu – relegated
10. Brumunddal 2 – relegated
11. MBK Domkirkeodden – relegated
12. Flisa – relegated

Group 7

1. Trysil – lost playoff
2. Faaberg
3. Ham-Kam 2
4. Lillehammer
5. Engerdal
6. Ottestad
7. Moelven – relegated
8. Ringsaker – relegated
9. Redalen – relegated
10. Follebu – relegated
11. Storhamar – relegated
12. Gjøvik-Lyn 2 – relegated

Group 8

1. Åssiden – promoted
2. Modum
3. Drammens BK
4. Jevnaker
5. Svelvik
6. Konnerud
7. Solberg
8. Hallingdal
9. Huringen
10. Kongsberg
11. Stoppen
12. Birkebeineren
13. Steinberg – relegated

- Holeværingen – pulled team

Group 9

1. Sandefjord 2 – lost playoff
2. Teie
3. Eik Tønsberg – merged with FK Tønsberg post-season)
4. Larvik Turn
5. FK Tønsberg 2 – merged with Eik Tønsberg post-season)
6. Runar
7. Sandefjord BK
8. Stokke
9. Ørn-Horten 2
10. Re
11. Borre
12. Husøy & Foynland – relegated

Group 10

1. Urædd – lost playoff
2. Odd 3
3. Hei
4. Skarphedin
5. Ulefoss/Skade (merged to Nome post-season)
6. Notodden 2
7. Pors 2
8. Stathelle og Omegn
9. Langesund
10. Storm 2 – relegated
11. Tollnes – relegated
12. Herkules – relegated

Group 11

1. Express – promoted
2. Søgne
3. Flekkefjord – withdrew post-season
4. Fløy 2
5. Våg
6. Arendal 2 – withdrew post-season
7. Jerv 2
8. Lyngdal
9. Hisøy
10. Vigør
11. Randesund
12. Kvinesdal
13. Farsund – relegated
14. Tveit – relegated

Group 12

1. Hinna – promoted
2. Eiger
3. Sandnes Ulf 2
4. Randaberg
5. Riska
6. Hana
7. Austrått
8. Vidar 2
9. Sunde
10. Egersund 2
11. Havdur
12. Hundvåg
13. Midtbygden – relegated
14. Voll – relegated

Group 13

1. Åkra – promoted
2. Frøyland
3. Haugesund 2
4. Varhaug
5. Kopervik
6. Ålgård
7. Vaulen
8. Skjold
9. Sola 2
10. Lura
11. Vard Haugesund 2
12. Nærbø
13. Klepp

- Torvastad – pulled team

Group 14

1. Bjarg – promoted
2. Arna-Bjørnar
3. Loddefjord
4. Tertnes
5. Åsane 2
6. Gneist
7. Sund
8. Fyllingsdalen 2
9. Osterøy
10. Smørås
11. Flaktveit – relegated
12. Vestsiden-Askøy – relegated

Group 15

1. Sandviken – promoted
2. Frøya
3. Lyngbø
4. Bremnes
5. NHH
6. Trott
7. Varegg
8. Djerv
9. Os 2
10. Trio – relegated
11. Øystese – relegated
12. Solid – relegated

Group 16

1. Årdal − promoted
2. Førde
3. Eid
4. Studentspretten
5. Stryn
6. Kaupanger
7. Tornado Måløy (merged with Skavøypoll post-season)
8. Høyang
9. Syril
10. Bremanger
11. Dale
12. Florø 2 – relegated

Group 17

1. Volda − promoted
2. Bergsøy
3. Rollon
4. Valder
5. Hødd 2
6. SIF/Hessa
7. Larsnes/Gursken
8. Norborg/Brattvåg 2
9. Emblem
10. Hareid
11. Ørsta – relegated
12. Blindheim – relegated

Group 18

1. Kristiansund 2 – lost playoff
2. Eide og Omegn
3. Surnadal
4. Dahle
5. Kristiansund FK
6. Malmefjorden
7. Tomrefjord
8. Midsund
9. Vestnes Varfjell
10. Åndalsnes
11. Averøykameratene – relegated
12. Elnesvågen og Omegn – relegated

Group 19

1. NTNUI − promoted
2. Rørvik
3. Levanger 2
4. Namsos
5. Vuku
6. Kvik
7. Fram
8. Nardo 2
9. Charlottenlund
10. Stjørdals-Blink 2
11. Vanvik – relegated
12. Ørland – relegated

Group 20

1. Tynset − promoted
2. Trygg/Lade
3. Heimdal
4. Orkla 2
5. Byåsen 2
6. Rennebu
7. Sverresborg
8. KIL/Hemne
9. Hitra
10. Svorkmo
11. Meldal – relegated
12. Røros – relegated

Group 21

1. Rana − promoted
2. Fauske/Sprint
3. Mosjøen
4. Grand Bodø
5. Sandnessjøen
6. Innstranda
7. Åga – relegated
8. Brønnøysund – relegated
9. Hemnes – relegated

Group 22

1. Skånland − promoted
2. Lofoten
3. Morild (withdrew post-season)
4. Grovfjord (defunct post-season)
5. Landsås
6. Andenes
7. Sortland
8. Melbo 2
9. Ballstad
10. Harstad 2 – relegated
11. Svolvær – relegated

- Medkila − pulled team, but not relegated

Group 23

1. Fløya 2 − folded post-season
2. Krokelvdalen
3. Skarp
4. Tromsdalen 2
5. Salangen
6. Stakkevollan
7. Bardufoss og Omegn
8. Nordkjosbotn (defunct post-season)
9. Lyngen/Karnes
10. Finnsnes 2
11. Storelva
12. Ishavsbyen

Group 24

1. Tverrelvdalen − declined promotion and went defunct
2. HIF/Stein
3. Porsanger
4. Kirkenes
5. Alta 2
6. Bjørnevatn
7. Bossekop
8. Tana (defunct post-season)
9. Honningsvåg (withdrew post-season)
10. Sørøy Glimt
11. Indrefjord – relegated
12. Nordlys

== Playoffs ==
- Fredrikstad 2 beat Sandefjord 2
- Grorud 2 and Skeid 2 beat Nesodden
- Toten beat Trysil
- Åssiden beat Urædd
- Volda beat Kristiansund 2
