= 2007 Norwegian Football Cup =

Norgesmesterskapet i fotball for herrer

Tournament details
- Country: Norway
- Teams: 128 (main competition)

Final positions
- Champions: Lillestrøm (5th title)
- Runners-up: Haugesund

Tournament statistics
- Matches played: 127
- Goals scored: 492 (3.87 per match)
- Top goal scorer(s): Daniel Nannskog (8 goals)

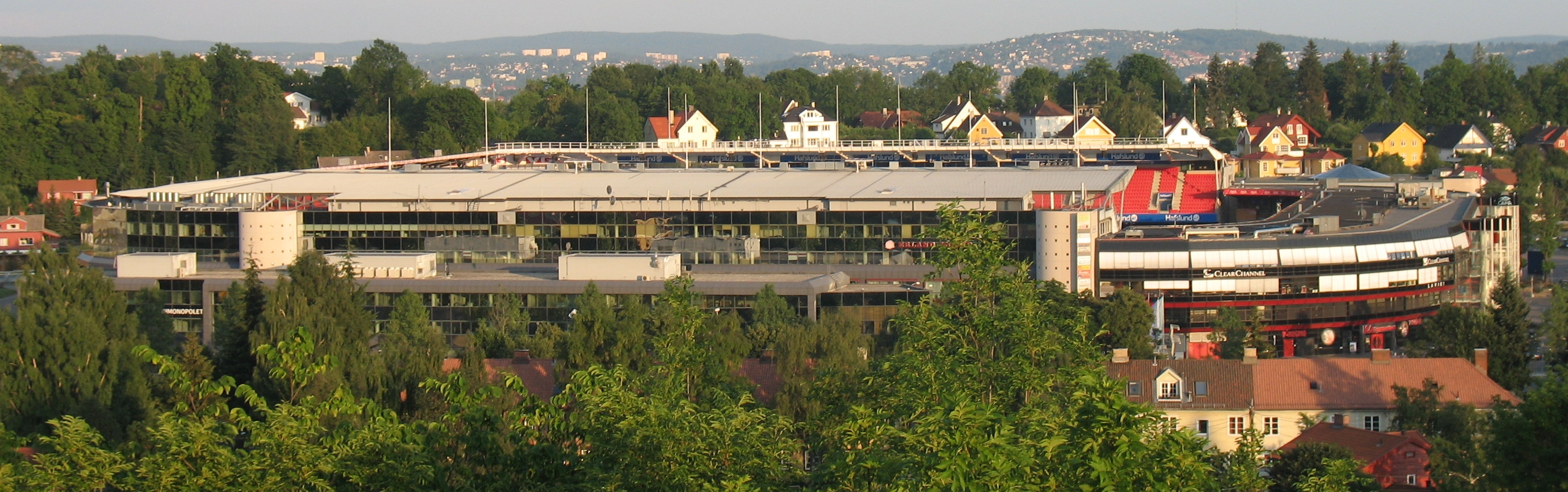
Ullevaal Stadion, Oslo - venue for the Norwegian Cup final

The 2007 Norwegian Football Cup was the 102nd season of Norwegian annual knockout football tournament. The competition started on 19 May 2007 with the first-round games and ended on 11 November 2007 with the final. The defending champions were Fredrikstad.

The format of the Cup has not changed for this season what means that, unlike other European cup competitions, all teams (including Tippeligaen ones) entered the Cup in the first round. In the First and Second Round amateur teams (or at least lower-placed at the time of the draw) were seeded and played the matches at home ground. From the third round until the end the draw was random.

The winners, Lillestrøm, qualified for the second qualifying round of the 2008–09 UEFA Cup.

== Calendar ==
Below are the dates for each round as given by the official schedule:

Round	Date(s)	Number of fixtures	Clubs
First round	19–20 May 2007	64	128 → 64
Second round	13–14 June 2007	32	64 → 32
Third round	26–28 June 2007	16	32 → 16
Fourth round	25–26 July 2007	8	16 → 8
Quarter-finals	18–19 August 2007	4	8 → 4
Semi-finals	26 September 2007	2	4 → 2
Final	11 November 2007	1	2 → 1

== First round ==
Team 1	Score	Team 2
19 May 2007
Lisleby	0–5	Fredrikstad
Kvik Halden	2–1	Sparta Sarpsborg
Manglerud Star	5–2	Kjelsås
Gjøvik-Lyn	0–3	Raufoss
Pors Grenland	2–0	Asker
Tollnes	1–4	Arendal
Randaberg	3–2 (a.e.t.)	Sandnes Ulf
Åsane	3–1	Fana
Træff	0–5	Kristiansund
Byåsen	4–0	Levanger
Lofoten	3–2	Mjølner
Skarp	1–2	Mo
20 May 2007
Fet	1–10	Lyn
Flisa	3–6	Lillestrøm
Toten	0–3	Vålerenga
Åssiden	1–9	Stabæk
Åskollen	2–6	Strømsgodset
Sandar	0–5	Sandefjord
Svarstad	0–5	Odd Grenland
Vindbjart	2–6	Start
Egersund	0–6	Viking
Trio	0–5	Brann
Sykkylven	0–7	Aalesund
Namsos	1–5	Rosenborg
Senja	0–3	Tromsø
Strømmen	1–2	Kongsvinger
Greåker	0–1	Moss
Sprint-Jeløy	0–3	Sarpsborg FK
Follo	3–1	Ull/Kisa
Nordstrand	1–5	Groruddalen
Rommen	1–0	Eidsvold TF
Korsvoll	3–1 (a.e.t.)	Ringsaker
Fagerborg	1–3	Drøbak-Frogn
Bærum	2–0	Lørenskog
Vollen	0–5	Mjøndalen
Skjetten	1–2	Skeid
Fjellhamar	2–5	Nybergsund
Lillehammer	1–4	Hønefoss
Brumunddal	0–3	HamKam
Åmot	0-4	KFUM Oslo
Eik-Tønsberg	1–9	FK Tønsberg
Herkules	0–3	Notodden
Vigør	1–5	Fløy
Ålgård	1–4	Mandalskameratene
Vardeneset	0–4	Bryne
Åkra	2–3	Vard Haugesund
Djerv 1919	1–6	Haugesund
Kopervik	2–0	Stavanger
Norheimsund	0–4	Løv-Ham
Os	1–0	Baune
Øygard	2–0	Fyllingen
Askøy	4–2 (a.e.t.)	Loddefjord
Fjøra	3–1	Hødd
Stryn	1–0	Sogndal
Volda	2–0	Averøykameratene
KIL/Hemne	3–1	Molde
Orkla	3–0	Nardo
NTNUI	3–5	Strindheim
Tiller	1–3	Steinkjer
Kolstad	0–5	Ranheim
Stjørdals-Blink	2–1	Harstad
Innstranden	1–3	Alta
Bossekop	1–3	Tromsdalen
Hammerfest	0–4	Bodø/Glimt

== Second round ==
Team 1	Score	Team 2
13 June 2007
Kvik Halden	0–5	Lyn
Sarpsborg FK	0–4	Fredrikstad
Mjøndalen	2–3	Vålerenga
Arendal	1–3	Odd Grenland
Randaberg	0–6	Viking
Øygard	0–5	Brann
Fjøra	0–4	Stabæk
Stryn	2–9	Strømsgodset
Volda	1–3	Aalesund
Orkla	0–5	Lillestrøm
Stjørdals-Blink	0–6	Tromsø
Follo	1–1 (2–4 p)	Korsvoll
KFUM Oslo	2–3 (a.e.t.)	Skeid
Rommen	0–7	Moss
Groruddalen	0–1 (a.e.t.)	Notodden
Bærum	2–0	HamKam
Kongsvinger	5–0	Pors Grenland
Nybergsund	4–1	Strindheim
Raufoss	0–2 (a.e.t.)	Drøbak-Frogn
Hønefoss	3–0	Os
Fløy	0–1 (a.e.t.)	Haugesund
Kopervik	3–1	Mandalskameratene
Askøy	0–5	Bryne
Løv-Ham	3–1	Åsane
Kristiansund	0–0 (5–6 p)	Manglerud Star
Mo	3–2	Ranheim
Lofoten	1–3 (a.e.t.)	Bodø/Glimt
Tromsdalen	3–2	Byåsen
Alta	1–0	Steinkjer
14 June 2007
Tønsberg	2–0	Sandefjord
Vard Haugesund	0–5	Start
KIL/Hemne	3–4 (a.e.t.)	Rosenborg

== Third round ==
This was the last round in which the Norwegian FA determined match-ups.

Team 1	Score	Team 2
26 June 2007
Vålerenga	4–1	Mo
27 June 2007
Fredrikstad	1–2	Nybergsund
Moss	0–3	Strømsgodset
Drøbak-Frogn	0–2	Viking
Manglerud Star	0–1	Start
Korsvoll	2–5 (a.e.t.)	Stabæk
Notodden	2–1 (a.e.t.)	Kongsvinger
Odd Grenland	4–1	Tønsberg
Haugesund	4–0	Løv-Ham
Kopervik	0–5	Brann
Aalesund	2–0	Alta
Bodø/Glimt	1–0	Hønefoss
Tromsø	4–1 (a.e.t.)	Tromsdalen
28 June 2007
Skeid	0–2 (a.e.t.)	Rosenborg
Lillestrøm	4–0	Bærum
Bryne	1–2	Lyn

== Fourth round ==
From this round onwards, matches were drawn by lots.

25 July 2007
18:00 CEST (UTC+2)

Lyn	1–0	Bodø/Glimt
Macallister 65'	Report

Ullevaal Stadion, Oslo
Attendance: 1,413
Referee: Kristoffer Helgerud

25 July 2007
18:00 CEST (UTC+2)

Lillestrøm	1–0	Aalesund
Mouelhi 86' (pen.)	Report

Åråsen Stadion, Lillestrøm
Attendance: 3,405
Referee: Espen Berntsen

25 July 2007
18:00 CEST (UTC+2)

Strømsgodset	4–1	Notodden
George 4'; Kovács 7', 15'; Ludvigsen 24'	Report	Ystaas 45'

Marienlyst Stadion, Drammen
Attendance: 1,885
Referee: Terje Hauge

25 July 2007
18:00 CEST (UTC+2)

Start	0–1	Haugesund
	Report	Moen 90'

Sør Arena, Kristiansand
Attendance: 1,870
Referee: Tom Henning Øvrebø

25 July 2007
18:00 CEST (UTC+2)

Viking	2–0	Brann
Gaarde 13'; Berg 84'	Report

Viking Stadion, Stavanger
Attendance: 13,184
Referee: Tommy Skjerven

25 July 2007
18:00 CEST (UTC+2)

Rosenborg	1–2	Odd Grenland
Konan Ya 2'	Report	Fevang 61'; Sørensen 90+1'

Lerkendal Stadion, Trondheim
Attendance: 5,165
Referee: Brage Sandmoen

26 July 2007
18:00 CEST (UTC+2)

Nybergsund	3–1	Vålerenga
Kleiven 8'; Joyce 19'; Bredvold 90+4'	Report	Sørensen 71'

Nybergsund Stadion, Nybergsund
Attendance: 3,750
Referee: Kjetil Sælen

8 August 2007
18:00 CEST (UTC+2)

Stabæk	3–0	Tromsø
Tchoyi 20'; Nannskog 69', 75'	Report

Nadderud Stadion, Bærum
Attendance: 2,434
Referee: Roy Helge Olsen

== Quarter-finals ==
18 August 2007
16:00 CEST (UTC+2)

Haugesund	6–1	Nybergsund
Weaver 14' (pen.), 16', 40', 49'; Larsen 76'; Antoine-Curier 84' (pen.)	Report	Bredvold 78'

Haugesund Stadion, Haugesund
Attendance: 4,227
Referee: Per Ivar Staberg

18 August 2007
19:00 CEST (UTC+2)

Odd Grenland	2–1	Viking
Fevang 42', 65'	Report	Stokholm 32'

Skagerak Arena, Skien
Attendance: 4,457
Referee: Tom Henning Øvrebø

19 August 2007
16:00 CEST (UTC+2)

Strømsgodset	2–4 (a.e.t.)	Stabæk
Bergdølmo 59'; Ohr 73'	Report	Gunnarsson 24', 30' (pen.); Nannskog 94'; Tchoyi 109'

Marienlyst Stadion, Drammen
Attendance: 3,063
Referee: Svein Oddvar Moen

19 August 2007
19:00 CEST (UTC+2)

Lyn	0–1	Lillestrøm
	Report	Kippe 66'

Ullevaal Stadion, Oslo
Attendance: 3,425
Referee: Svein-Erik Edvartsen

== Semi-finals ==
26 September 2007
16:00 CEST (UTC+2)

Haugesund	1–0	Odd Grenland
Rodríguez 11'	Report

Haugesund Stadion, Haugesund
Attendance: 5,000
Referee: Brage Sandmoen

26 September 2007
19:00 CEST (UTC+2)

Lillestrøm	2–0	Stabæk
Brenne 10'; Sundgot 39'	Report

Åråsen Stadion, Lillestrøm
Attendance: 6,700
Referee: Terje Hauge

== Final ==
11 November 2007
13:15 CET (UTC+1)

Haugesund	0–2	Lillestrøm
	Report	Occean 57', 90'

Ullevaal Stadion, Oslo
Attendance: 24,361
Referee: Per Ivar Staberg (Harstad)
