= 2019 Norwegian Third Division =

3. divisjon
- Season: 2019
- Champions: Eidsvold Turn; Vålerenga 2; Fløy; Vard Haugesund; Rosenborg 2; Fløya
- Promoted: Eidsvold Turn; Vålerenga 2; Fløy; Vard Haugesund; Rosenborg 2; Fløya
- Relegated: 17 teams
- Matches played: 1,092
- Goals scored: 4,295 (3.93 per match)
- Top goalscorer: Simen August Næss (30 goals)

The 2019 3. divisjon (referred to as Norsk Tipping-ligaen after its sponsor) was a fourth-tier Norwegian football league season. The league consisted of 84 teams divided into 6 groups of 14 teams each and began on 13 April 2019.

The league was played as a double round-robin tournament, where all teams played 26 matches.

== Team changes ==
The following teams changed division since the 2018 season in 2019.

=== To 3. divisjon ===
Promoted from 4. divisjon

- 24 teams

Relegated from 2. divisjon

- Nybergsund
- Hønefoss
- Stabæk 2
- Fløy
- Vålerenga 2
- Vard Haugesund

=== From 3. divisjon ===
Promoted to 2. divisjon

- Oppsal
- Kvik Halden
- Sola
- Sotra
- Byåsen
- Senja

Relegated to 4. divisjon

- 24 teams

== League tables ==
=== Group 1 ===
Pos	Team	Pld	W	D	L	GF	GA	GD	Pts	Promotion or relegation
1	Eidsvold Turn (P)	26	22	2	2	73	17	+56	68	Promotion to Second Division
2	Lørenskog	26	19	2	5	75	34	+41	59	
3	Sarpsborg 08 2	26	15	2	9	59	49	+10	47	
4	Spjelkavik	26	12	6	8	48	33	+15	42	
5	Nordstrand	26	11	7	8	60	45	+15	40	
6	Aalesund 2	26	11	6	9	54	37	+17	39	
7	Molde 2	26	11	3	12	50	48	+2	36	
8	Kråkerøy	26	10	3	13	29	45	−16	33	
9	Rommen	26	8	7	11	44	60	−16	31	
10	Træff	26	8	5	13	33	47	−14	29	
11	Stabæk 2	26	8	5	13	44	62	−18	29	
12	Herd (R)	26	7	7	12	34	46	−12	28	Relegation to Fourth Division
13	Sunndal (R)	26	5	5	16	36	67	−31	20	Relegation to Fourth Division
14	Årvoll (R)	26	2	6	18	24	73	−49	12	Relegation to Fourth Division

Source: fotball.no (in Norwegian)
Rules for classification: 1) Points; 2) Goal difference; 3) Goals scored; 4) Head-to-head points; 5) Head-to-head goal difference; 6) Head-to-head away goals scored (only if between two teams); 7) Head-to-head goals scored; 8) Play-off (only used to decide champions or relegation).
(P) Promoted; (R) Relegated

=== Group 2 ===
Pos	Team	Pld	W	D	L	GF	GA	GD	Pts	Promotion or relegation
1	Vålerenga 2 (P)	26	20	3	3	85	27	+58	63	Promotion to Second Division
2	Tønsberg	26	16	4	6	56	25	+31	52	
3	Follo	26	16	3	7	44	27	+17	51	
4	Ullern	26	15	5	6	61	33	+28	50	
5	Ørn-Horten	26	14	8	4	57	29	+28	50	
6	Lyn	26	11	6	9	57	45	+12	39	
7	Ready	26	10	5	11	37	41	−4	35	
8	Frigg	26	10	4	12	38	55	−17	34	
9	Mjøndalen 2	26	9	4	13	46	46	0	31	
10	Lokomotiv Oslo	26	7	8	11	40	38	+2	29	
11	Halsen	26	9	2	15	44	72	−28	29	
12	Grei (R)	26	8	4	14	30	45	−15	28	Relegation to Fourth Division
13	Norild (R)	26	4	1	21	35	91	−56	13	Relegation to Fourth Division
14	Drøbak/Frogn (R)	26	4	1	21	23	79	−56	13	Relegation to Fourth Division

Source: fotball.no (in Norwegian)
Rules for classification: 1) Points; 2) Goal difference; 3) Goals scored; 4) Head-to-head points; 5) Head-to-head goal difference; 6) Head-to-head away goals scored (only if between two teams); 7) Head-to-head goals scored; 8) Play-off (only used to decide champions or relegation).
(P) Promoted; (R) Relegated

=== Group 3 ===
Pos	Team	Pld	W	D	L	GF	GA	GD	Pts	Promotion or relegation
1	Fløy-Flekkerøy (P)	26	23	3	0	86	17	+69	72	Promotion to Second Division
2	Mandalskameratene	26	16	5	5	68	43	+25	53	
3	Viking 2	26	16	4	6	85	39	+46	52	
4	Vindbjart	26	12	7	7	62	48	+14	43	
5	Flint	26	12	3	11	53	52	+1	39	
6	Madla	26	10	7	9	50	53	−3	37	
7	Pors	26	11	3	12	42	44	−2	36	
8	Staal Jørpeland	26	9	7	10	45	40	+5	34	
9	Brodd	26	9	5	12	51	50	+1	32	
10	Start 2	26	9	5	12	40	59	−19	32	
11	Donn	26	9	4	13	40	60	−20	31	
12	Bryne 2 (R)	26	6	5	15	42	70	−28	23	Relegation to Fourth Division
13	Vardeneset (R)	26	5	5	16	34	73	−39	20	Relegation to Fourth Division
14	Storm (R)	26	2	3	21	24	74	−50	9	Relegation to Fourth Division

Source: fotball.no (in Norwegian)
Rules for classification: 1) Points; 2) Goal difference; 3) Goals scored; 4) Head-to-head points; 5) Head-to-head goal difference; 6) Head-to-head away goals scored (only if between two teams); 7) Head-to-head goals scored; 8) Play-off (only used to decide champions or relegation).
(P) Promoted; (R) Relegated

=== Group 4 ===
Pos	Team	Pld	W	D	L	GF	GA	GD	Pts	Promotion or relegation
1	Vard Haugesund (P)	26	20	3	3	103	22	+81	63	Promotion to Second Division
2	Lysekloster	26	17	3	6	85	30	+55	54	
3	Djerv 1919	26	16	3	7	72	38	+34	51	
4	Fyllingsdalen	26	16	2	8	68	41	+27	50	
5	Fana	26	14	6	6	76	40	+36	48	
6	Stord	26	12	4	10	70	48	+22	40	
7	Strømsgodset 2	26	12	3	11	55	49	+6	39	
8	Sogndal 2	26	10	5	11	54	52	+2	35	
9	Brann 2	26	10	3	13	49	49	0	33	
10	Fjøra	26	10	3	13	54	78	−24	33	
11	Os	26	9	4	13	58	46	+12	31	
12	Vestfossen (R)	26	7	3	16	43	70	−27	24	Relegation to Fourth Division
13	Bergen Nord (R)	26	6	2	18	30	71	−41	20	Relegation to Fourth Division
14	Valdres (R)	26	1	0	25	10	193	−183	3	Relegation to Fourth Division

Source: fotball.no (in Norwegian)
Rules for classification: 1) Points; 2) Goal difference; 3) Goals scored; 4) Head-to-head points; 5) Head-to-head goal difference; 6) Head-to-head away goals scored (only if between two teams); 7) Head-to-head goals scored; 8) Play-off (only used to decide champions or relegation).
(P) Promoted; (R) Relegated

=== Group 5 ===
Pos	Team	Pld	W	D	L	GF	GA	GD	Pts	Promotion or relegation
1	Rosenborg 2 (P)	26	19	3	4	74	29	+45	60	Promotion to Second Division
2	Strindheim	26	14	4	8	59	46	+13	46	
3	Gjøvik-Lyn	26	15	0	11	63	50	+13	45	
4	Kolstad	26	13	4	9	55	43	+12	43	
5	Nybergsund IL-Trysil	26	13	3	10	49	36	+13	42	
6	Ranheim 2	26	12	5	9	65	52	+13	41	
7	Brumunddal	26	11	5	10	51	40	+11	38	
8	Tillerbyen	26	11	4	11	36	38	−2	37	
9	Melhus	26	10	5	11	43	52	−9	35	
10	Raufoss 2	26	10	2	14	42	69	−27	32	
11	Kongsvinger 2	26	8	6	12	54	56	−2	30	
12	Orkla (Note: Orkla were originally relegated and Fløya 2 promoted, but the latter folded their team after the 2019 season and so Orkla were spared from relegation as the best relegated team in terms of points accumulated.)	26	8	6	12	48	55	−7	30	
13	Verdal (R)	26	6	8	12	32	52	−20	26	Relegation to Fourth Division
14	Steinkjer (R)	26	2	5	19	20	73	−53	11	Relegation to Fourth Division

Source: fotball.no (in Norwegian)
Rules for classification: 1) Points; 2) Goal difference; 3) Goals scored; 4) Head-to-head points; 5) Head-to-head goal difference; 6) Head-to-head away goals scored (only if between two teams); 7) Head-to-head goals scored; 8) Play-off (only used to decide champions or relegation).
(P) Promoted; (R) Relegated

=== Group 6 ===
Pos	Team	Pld	W	D	L	GF	GA	GD	Pts	Promotion or relegation
1	Fløya (P)	26	18	2	6	75	40	+35	56	Promotion to Second Division
2	Finnsnes	26	16	6	4	67	29	+38	54	
3	Gjelleråsen	26	15	3	8	61	41	+20	48	
4	Hønefoss	26	14	5	7	67	40	+27	47	
5	Melbo	26	14	4	8	54	32	+22	46	
6	Bodø/Glimt 2	26	14	4	8	62	49	+13	46	
7	Junkeren	26	12	3	11	69	56	+13	39	
8	Skjervøy	26	12	3	11	47	54	−7	39	
9	Ull/Kisa 2	26	10	4	12	50	61	−11	34	
10	Lillestrøm 2	26	9	5	12	52	47	+5	32	
11	Tromsø 2	26	9	4	13	51	61	−10	31	
12	Harstad (R)	26	8	3	15	33	59	−26	27	Relegation to Fourth Division
13	Skjetten (R)	26	5	2	19	31	62	−31	17	Relegation to Fourth Division
14	Leknes (R)	26	0	4	22	20	108	−88	4	Relegation to Fourth Division

Source: fotball.no (in Norwegian)
Rules for classification: 1) Points; 2) Goal difference; 3) Goals scored; 4) Head-to-head points; 5) Head-to-head goal difference; 6) Head-to-head away goals scored (only if between two teams); 7) Head-to-head goals scored; 8) Play-off (only used to decide champions or relegation).
(P) Promoted; (R) Relegated

== Top scorers ==
Rank	Player	Club	Goals
1	(Norway) Simen August Næss	Lysekloster	30
2	(Norway) Riki Tomas Alba	Lørenskog	26
2	(Norway) Joacim Holtan	Mandalskameratene	26
2	(Norway) Ivar Johannes Unhjem	Junkeren	26
5	(Norway) Rocky Lekaj	Gjøvik-Lyn	25
6	(Norway) Erling Flotve Myklebust	Vard Haugesund	23
7	(Iceland) Ingolfur Örn Kristjansson	Eidsvold Turn	22
7	(Norway) Maid Memic	Djerv 1919	22
7	(Iceland) Viktor Smari Segatta	Stord	22
7	(Norway) Markus Woldsund	Nordstrand	22
