= Eidsvåg =

Eidsvåg may refer to:

== People ==
- Bjørn Eidsvåg, a Norwegian singer, songwriter and priest

== Places ==
- Eidsvåg, Nesset, a village in Molde municipality in Møre og Romsdal county, Norway
- Eidsvåg, Bergen, a neighbourhood in the city of Bergen in Vestland county, Norway

== Other ==
- Eidsvåg IL (Hordaland), a football club in Bergen, Norway
- MV Eidsvag, a Norwegian coaster
