= 2019 in Norwegian football =

Football in Norway
- Season: 2019

Men's football
- Eliteserien: Molde
- 1. divisjon: Aalesund
- 2. divisjon: Stjørdals-Blink (Group 1); Grorud (Group 2)
- Cupen: Viking

Women's football
- Toppserien: LSK Kvinner
- 1. divisjon: Fløya
- Cupen: LSK Kvinner

The 2019 season was the 114th season of competitive football in Norway.

The season began on 31 March 2019, and ended on 8 December with the 2019 Norwegian Football Cup final.

== Men's football ==
=== League season ===
==== Promotion and relegation ====
League	Promoted to league	Relegated from league
Eliteserien	Viking; Mjøndalen	Start; Sandefjord
1. divisjon	Raufoss; Skeid; KFUM Oslo	Åsane; Florø; Levanger
2. divisjon	Oppsal; Kvik Halden; Sola; Sotra; Byåsen; Senja	Nybergsund; Hønefoss; Stabæk 2; Fløy; Vålerenga 2; Vard Haugesund

==== Eliteserien ====
Pos	Team	Pld	W	D	L	GF	GA	GD	Pts	Qualification or relegation
1	Molde (C)	30	21	5	4	72	31	+41	68	Qualification for the Champions League first qualifying round
2	Bodø/Glimt	30	15	9	6	64	44	+20	54	Qualification for the Europa League first qualifying round
3	Rosenborg	30	14	10	6	53	41	+12	52	Qualification for the Europa League first qualifying round
4	Odd	30	15	7	8	45	40	+5	52	
5	Viking	30	13	8	9	55	42	+13	47	Qualification for the Europa League second qualifying round (Note: Viking qualified for the Europa League second qualifying round as winners of the 2019 Norwegian Cup.)
6	Kristiansund	30	11	8	11	41	41	0	41	
7	Haugesund	30	9	13	8	44	37	+7	40	
8	Stabæk	30	10	10	10	38	36	+2	40	
9	Brann	30	10	10	10	32	37	−5	40	
10	Vålerenga	30	8	10	12	39	44	−5	34	
11	Strømsgodset	30	8	8	14	41	54	−13	32	
12	Sarpsborg 08	30	5	15	10	30	40	−10	30	
13	Mjøndalen	30	6	12	12	38	52	−14	30	
14	Lillestrøm (R)	30	7	9	14	32	47	−15	30	Qualification for the relegation play-offs
15	Tromsø (R)	30	8	6	16	39	58	−19	30	Relegation to First Division
16	Ranheim (R)	30	7	6	17	36	55	−19	27	Relegation to First Division

Source: Football Association of Norway (in Norwegian), Soccerway
Rules for classification: 1) Points; 2) Goal difference; 3) Goals scored; 4) Head-to-head points; 5) Head-to-head goal difference; 6) Head-to-head away goals scored (only if between two teams); 7) Head-to-head goals scored; 8) Play-off (only used to decide champions or relegation).
(C) Champions; (R) Relegated

==== 1. divisjon ====
Pos	Team	Pld	W	D	L	GF	GA	GD	Pts	Promotion, qualification or relegation
1	Aalesund (C, P)	30	25	4	1	67	25	+42	79	Promotion to Eliteserien
2	Sandefjord (P)	30	19	8	3	53	30	+23	65	Promotion to Eliteserien
3	Start (O, P)	30	19	5	6	54	31	+23	62	Qualification for the promotion play-offs
4	KFUM Oslo	30	13	9	8	58	42	+16	48	Qualification for the promotion play-offs
5	Kongsvinger	30	14	4	12	38	36	+2	46	Qualification for the promotion play-offs
6	Sogndal	30	13	6	11	51	39	+12	45	Qualification for the promotion play-offs
7	Nest-Sotra	30	14	6	10	43	31	+12	44 (Note: Nest-Sotra have been deducted a total of 4 points due to financial difficulties. They were deducted 1 point in May and 3 points in October.)	
8	Ull/Kisa	30	11	6	13	47	47	0	39	
9	Sandnes Ulf	30	11	5	14	46	49	−3	38	
10	HamKam	30	11	5	14	43	47	−4	38	
11	Raufoss	30	12	2	16	47	59	−12	38	
12	Jerv	30	8	9	13	34	54	−20	33	
13	Strømmen	30	7	10	13	32	46	−14	30 (Note: Strømmen have been deducted 1 point.)	
14	Notodden (R)	30	6	7	17	35	53	−18	25	Qualification for the relegation play-offs
15	Skeid (R)	30	4	10	16	38	54	−16	22	Relegation to Second Division
16	Tromsdalen (R)	30	3	4	23	36	79	−43	13	Relegation to Second Division

Source: nifs.no (in Norwegian), Soccerway
Rules for classification: 1) Points; 2) Goal difference; 3) Goals scored; 4) Head-to-head points; 5) Head-to-head goal difference; 6) Head-to-head away goals scored (only if between two teams); 7) Head-to-head goals scored; 8) Play-off (only used to decide champions or relegation).
(C) Champions; (O) Play-off winners; (P) Promoted; (R) Relegated

==== 2. divisjon ====
===== Group 1 =====
Pos	Team	Pld	W	D	L	GF	GA	GD	Pts	Promotion, qualification or relegation
1	Stjørdals-Blink (C, P)	26	18	6	2	69	22	+47	60	Promotion to First Division
2	Kvik Halden	26	18	4	4	57	26	+31	58	Qualification for promotion play-offs
3	Fredrikstad	26	16	5	5	52	28	+24	53	
4	Egersund	26	13	6	7	60	36	+24	45	
5	Levanger	26	13	2	11	38	40	−2	41	
6	Arendal	26	12	3	11	49	40	+9	39	
7	Hødd	26	10	5	11	40	45	−5	35	
8	Moss	26	10	4	12	35	46	−11	34	
9	Brattvåg	26	9	6	11	43	50	−7	33	
10	Bryne	26	7	7	12	30	41	−11	28	
11	Nardo	26	8	5	13	27	43	−16	27 (Note: Nardo have been deducted 2 points due to financial difficulties.)	
12	Vidar (R)	26	5	6	15	32	51	−19	21	Relegation to Third Division
13	Sola (R)	26	6	2	18	32	61	−29	20	Relegation to Third Division
14	Byåsen (R)	26	4	5	17	28	63	−35	17	Relegation to Third Division

Source: nifs.no (in Norwegian)
Rules for classification: 1) Points; 2) Goal difference; 3) Goals scored; 4) Head-to-head points; 5) Head-to-head goal difference; 6) Head-to-head away goals scored (only if between two teams); 7) Head-to-head goals scored; 8) Play-off (only used to decide champions or relegation).
(C) Champions; (P) Promoted; (R) Relegated

===== Group 2 =====
Pos	Team	Pld	W	D	L	GF	GA	GD	Pts	Promotion, qualification or relegation
1	Grorud (C, P)	26	15	6	5	47	32	+15	51	Promotion to First Division
2	Åsane (O, P)	26	15	5	6	66	31	+35	50	Qualification for promotion play-offs
3	Kjelsås	26	13	8	5	50	30	+20	47	
4	Asker	26	13	7	6	39	28	+11	46	
5	Fram Larvik	26	12	7	7	50	34	+16	43	
6	Alta	26	12	5	9	44	41	+3	41	
7	Florø	26	9	8	9	36	41	−5	35	
8	Odd 2	26	10	2	14	46	45	+1	32	
9	Sotra	26	8	6	12	34	37	−3	30	
10	Bærum	26	7	8	11	39	55	−16	29	
11	Senja	26	7	6	13	31	47	−16	27	
12	Elverum (R)	26	7	5	14	34	46	−12	26	Relegation to Third Division
13	Oppsal (R)	26	6	6	14	35	60	−25	24	Relegation to Third Division
14	Mjølner (R)	26	6	5	15	30	54	−24	23	Relegation to Third Division

Source: nifs.no (in Norwegian)
Rules for classification: 1) Points; 2) Goal difference; 3) Goals scored; 4) Head-to-head points; 5) Head-to-head goal difference; 6) Head-to-head away goals scored (only if between two teams); 7) Head-to-head goals scored; 8) Play-off (only used to decide champions or relegation).
(C) Champions; (O) Play-off winners; (P) Promoted; (R) Relegated

==== 3. divisjon ====
===== Group 1 =====
Pos	Team	Pld	W	D	L	GF	GA	GD	Pts	Promotion or relegation
1	Eidsvold Turn (P)	26	22	2	2	73	17	+56	68	Promotion to Second Division
2	Lørenskog	26	19	2	5	75	34	+41	59	
3	Sarpsborg 08 2	26	15	2	9	59	49	+10	47	
4	Spjelkavik	26	12	6	8	48	33	+15	42	
5	Nordstrand	26	11	7	8	60	45	+15	40	
6	Aalesund 2	26	11	6	9	54	37	+17	39	
7	Molde 2	26	11	3	12	50	48	+2	36	
8	Kråkerøy	26	10	3	13	29	45	−16	33	
9	Rommen	26	8	7	11	44	60	−16	31	
10	Træff	26	8	5	13	33	47	−14	29	
11	Stabæk 2	26	8	5	13	44	62	−18	29	
12	Herd (R)	26	7	7	12	34	46	−12	28	Relegation to Fourth Division
13	Sunndal (R)	26	5	5	16	36	67	−31	20	Relegation to Fourth Division
14	Årvoll (R)	26	2	6	18	24	73	−49	12	Relegation to Fourth Division

Source: fotball.no (in Norwegian)
Rules for classification: 1) Points; 2) Goal difference; 3) Goals scored; 4) Head-to-head points; 5) Head-to-head goal difference; 6) Head-to-head away goals scored (only if between two teams); 7) Head-to-head goals scored; 8) Play-off (only used to decide champions or relegation).
(P) Promoted; (R) Relegated

===== Group 2 =====
Pos	Team	Pld	W	D	L	GF	GA	GD	Pts	Promotion or relegation
1	Vålerenga 2 (P)	26	20	3	3	85	27	+58	63	Promotion to Second Division
2	Tønsberg	26	16	4	6	56	25	+31	52	
3	Follo	26	16	3	7	44	27	+17	51	
4	Ullern	26	15	5	6	61	33	+28	50	
5	Ørn-Horten	26	14	8	4	57	29	+28	50	
6	Lyn	26	11	6	9	57	45	+12	39	
7	Ready	26	10	5	11	37	41	−4	35	
8	Frigg	26	10	4	12	38	55	−17	34	
9	Mjøndalen 2	26	9	4	13	46	46	0	31	
10	Lokomotiv Oslo	26	7	8	11	40	38	+2	29	
11	Halsen	26	9	2	15	44	72	−28	29	
12	Grei (R)	26	8	4	14	30	45	−15	28	Relegation to Fourth Division
13	Norild (R)	26	4	1	21	35	91	−56	13	Relegation to Fourth Division
14	Drøbak/Frogn (R)	26	4	1	21	23	79	−56	13	Relegation to Fourth Division

Source: fotball.no (in Norwegian)
Rules for classification: 1) Points; 2) Goal difference; 3) Goals scored; 4) Head-to-head points; 5) Head-to-head goal difference; 6) Head-to-head away goals scored (only if between two teams); 7) Head-to-head goals scored; 8) Play-off (only used to decide champions or relegation).
(P) Promoted; (R) Relegated

===== Group 3 =====
Pos	Team	Pld	W	D	L	GF	GA	GD	Pts	Promotion or relegation
1	Fløy-Flekkerøy (P)	26	23	3	0	86	17	+69	72	Promotion to Second Division
2	Mandalskameratene	26	16	5	5	68	43	+25	53	
3	Viking 2	26	16	4	6	85	39	+46	52	
4	Vindbjart	26	12	7	7	62	48	+14	43	
5	Flint	26	12	3	11	53	52	+1	39	
6	Madla	26	10	7	9	50	53	−3	37	
7	Pors	26	11	3	12	42	44	−2	36	
8	Staal Jørpeland	26	9	7	10	45	40	+5	34	
9	Brodd	26	9	5	12	51	50	+1	32	
10	Start 2	26	9	5	12	40	59	−19	32	
11	Donn	26	9	4	13	40	60	−20	31	
12	Bryne 2 (R)	26	6	5	15	42	70	−28	23	Relegation to Fourth Division
13	Vardeneset (R)	26	5	5	16	34	73	−39	20	Relegation to Fourth Division
14	Storm (R)	26	2	3	21	24	74	−50	9	Relegation to Fourth Division

Source: fotball.no (in Norwegian)
Rules for classification: 1) Points; 2) Goal difference; 3) Goals scored; 4) Head-to-head points; 5) Head-to-head goal difference; 6) Head-to-head away goals scored (only if between two teams); 7) Head-to-head goals scored; 8) Play-off (only used to decide champions or relegation).
(P) Promoted; (R) Relegated

===== Group 4 =====
Pos	Team	Pld	W	D	L	GF	GA	GD	Pts	Promotion or relegation
1	Vard Haugesund (P)	26	20	3	3	103	22	+81	63	Promotion to Second Division
2	Lysekloster	26	17	3	6	85	30	+55	54	
3	Djerv 1919	26	16	3	7	72	38	+34	51	
4	Fyllingsdalen	26	16	2	8	68	41	+27	50	
5	Fana	26	14	6	6	76	40	+36	48	
6	Stord	26	12	4	10	70	48	+22	40	
7	Strømsgodset 2	26	12	3	11	55	49	+6	39	
8	Sogndal 2	26	10	5	11	54	52	+2	35	
9	Brann 2	26	10	3	13	49	49	0	33	
10	Fjøra	26	10	3	13	54	78	−24	33	
11	Os	26	9	4	13	58	46	+12	31	
12	Vestfossen (R)	26	7	3	16	43	70	−27	24	Relegation to Fourth Division
13	Bergen Nord (R)	26	6	2	18	30	71	−41	20	Relegation to Fourth Division
14	Valdres (R)	26	1	0	25	10	193	−183	3	Relegation to Fourth Division

Source: fotball.no (in Norwegian)
Rules for classification: 1) Points; 2) Goal difference; 3) Goals scored; 4) Head-to-head points; 5) Head-to-head goal difference; 6) Head-to-head away goals scored (only if between two teams); 7) Head-to-head goals scored; 8) Play-off (only used to decide champions or relegation).
(P) Promoted; (R) Relegated

===== Group 5 =====
Pos	Team	Pld	W	D	L	GF	GA	GD	Pts	Promotion or relegation
1	Rosenborg 2 (P)	26	19	3	4	74	29	+45	60	Promotion to Second Division
2	Strindheim	26	14	4	8	59	46	+13	46	
3	Gjøvik-Lyn	26	15	0	11	63	50	+13	45	
4	Kolstad	26	13	4	9	55	43	+12	43	
5	Nybergsund IL-Trysil	26	13	3	10	49	36	+13	42	
6	Ranheim 2	26	12	5	9	65	52	+13	41	
7	Brumunddal	26	11	5	10	51	40	+11	38	
8	Tillerbyen	26	11	4	11	36	38	−2	37	
9	Melhus	26	10	5	11	43	52	−9	35	
10	Raufoss 2	26	10	2	14	42	69	−27	32	
11	Kongsvinger 2	26	8	6	12	54	56	−2	30	
12	Orkla (Note: Orkla were originally relegated and Fløya 2 promoted, but the latter folded their team after the 2019 season and so Orkla were spared from relegation as the best relegated team in terms of points accumulated.)	26	8	6	12	48	55	−7	30	
13	Verdal (R)	26	6	8	12	32	52	−20	26	Relegation to Fourth Division
14	Steinkjer (R)	26	2	5	19	20	73	−53	11	Relegation to Fourth Division

Source: fotball.no (in Norwegian)
Rules for classification: 1) Points; 2) Goal difference; 3) Goals scored; 4) Head-to-head points; 5) Head-to-head goal difference; 6) Head-to-head away goals scored (only if between two teams); 7) Head-to-head goals scored; 8) Play-off (only used to decide champions or relegation).
(P) Promoted; (R) Relegated

===== Group 6 =====
Pos	Team	Pld	W	D	L	GF	GA	GD	Pts	Promotion or relegation
1	Fløya (P)	26	18	2	6	75	40	+35	56	Promotion to Second Division
2	Finnsnes	26	16	6	4	67	29	+38	54	
3	Gjelleråsen	26	15	3	8	61	41	+20	48	
4	Hønefoss	26	14	5	7	67	40	+27	47	
5	Melbo	26	14	4	8	54	32	+22	46	
6	Bodø/Glimt 2	26	14	4	8	62	49	+13	46	
7	Junkeren	26	12	3	11	69	56	+13	39	
8	Skjervøy	26	12	3	11	47	54	−7	39	
9	Ull/Kisa 2	26	10	4	12	50	61	−11	34	
10	Lillestrøm 2	26	9	5	12	52	47	+5	32	
11	Tromsø 2	26	9	4	13	51	61	−10	31	
12	Harstad (R)	26	8	3	15	33	59	−26	27	Relegation to Fourth Division
13	Skjetten (R)	26	5	2	19	31	62	−31	17	Relegation to Fourth Division
14	Leknes (R)	26	0	4	22	20	108	−88	4	Relegation to Fourth Division

Source: fotball.no (in Norwegian)
Rules for classification: 1) Points; 2) Goal difference; 3) Goals scored; 4) Head-to-head points; 5) Head-to-head goal difference; 6) Head-to-head away goals scored (only if between two teams); 7) Head-to-head goals scored; 8) Play-off (only used to decide champions or relegation).
(P) Promoted; (R) Relegated

=== Cup competitions ===
==== Norwegian Cup ====
===== Final =====
8 December 2019
13:15 CET (UTC+1)

Haugesund	0–1	Viking
	Report	Tripić 51' (pen.)

Ullevaal Stadion, Oslo
Attendance: 21,895
Referee: Espen Eskås (Bækkelaget)

== Women's football ==
=== League season ===
==== Promotion and relegation ====
League	Promoted to league	Relegated from league
Toppserien	Fart	Grand Bodø
1. divisjon	Hønefoss; Snøgg	Urædd; Bossekop

==== Toppserien ====
Pos	Team	Pld	W	D	L	GF	GA	GD	Pts	Qualification or relegation
1	LSK Kvinner (C)	22	15	5	2	51	18	+33	50	Qualification for the Champions League Round of 32
2	Vålerenga	22	14	4	4	41	24	+17	46	Qualification for the Champions League qualifying round
3	Klepp	22	14	2	6	48	19	+29	44	
4	Sandviken	22	12	4	6	43	32	+11	40	
5	Avaldsnes	22	9	7	6	40	33	+7	34	
6	Røa	22	7	8	7	40	35	+5	29	
7	Trondheims-Ørn	22	8	5	9	26	22	+4	29	
8	Kolbotn	22	7	6	9	35	39	−4	27	
9	Arna-Bjørnar	22	6	5	11	26	41	−15	23	
10	Lyn (O)	22	4	8	10	23	37	−14	20	Qualification for the relegation play-offs
11	Stabæk (R)	22	3	4	15	16	43	−27	13	Relegation to First Division
12	Fart (R)	22	2	4	16	14	60	−46	10	Relegation to First Division

Source: Norges Fotballforbund (in Norwegian)
Rules for classification: 1) Points; 2) Goal difference; 3) Number of goals scored; 4) Head-to-head points; 5) Head-to-head goal difference; 6) Head-to-head away goals scored
(C) Champions; (O) Play-off winners; (R) Relegated

==== 1. divisjon ====
Pos	Team	Pld	W	D	L	GF	GA	GD	Pts	Promotion, qualification or relegation
1	Fløya (C)	22	15	2	5	62	30	+32	47	Qualification for the promotion play-offs
2	Hønefoss	22	14	3	5	47	23	+24	45	
3	Øvrevoll Hosle	22	13	4	5	55	26	+29	43	
4	Medkila	22	12	5	5	37	33	+4	41	
5	Amazon Grimstad	22	11	1	10	51	36	+15	34	
6	Grei	22	9	6	7	46	40	+6	33	
7	Åsane	22	9	5	8	38	33	+5	32	
8	Grand Bodø (R)	22	8	3	11	34	45	−11	27	Qualification for the relegation play-offs
9	Byåsen (R)	22	7	5	10	39	55	−16	26	Relegation to Second Division
10	Kaupanger (R)	22	4	6	12	13	41	−28	18	Relegation to Second Division
11	Nanset (R)	22	5	1	16	21	52	−31	16	Relegation to Second Division
12	Snøgg (R)	22	2	5	15	18	47	−29	11	Relegation to Second Division

Source: nifs.no
Rules for classification: 1) Points; 2) Goal difference; 3) Goals scored; 4) Head-to-head points; 5) Head-to-head goal difference; 6) Head-to-head away goals scored (only if between two teams); 7) Head-to-head goals scored; 8) Play-off (only used to decide champions or relegation).
(C) Champions; (R) Relegated

=== Norwegian Women's Cup ===
==== Final ====
23 November 2019
16:00

LSK Kvinner	5–1	Vålerenga
Thorsnes 11'; Nautnes 20', 25'; Åsland 45'; Sønstevold 57'	Report	Njoya 51'

Telenor Arena, Bærum
Attendance: 5,142
Referee: Ingvild Langnes Aarland (Malmefjorden)

== UEFA competitions ==
=== UEFA Champions League ===
==== Qualifying phase ====
===== First qualifying round =====
Team 1	Agg.	Team 2	1st leg	2nd leg
Linfield (Northern Ireland)	0–6	(Norway) Rosenborg	0–2	0–4

===== Second qualifying round =====
Team 1	Agg.	Team 2	1st leg	2nd leg
BATE Borisov (Belarus)	2–3	(Norway) Rosenborg	2–1	0–2

===== Third qualifying round =====
Team 1	Agg.	Team 2	1st leg	2nd leg
Maribor (Slovenia)	2–6	(Norway) Rosenborg	1–3	1–3

===== Play-off round =====
Team 1	Agg.	Team 2	1st leg	2nd leg
Dinamo Zagreb (Croatia)	3–1	(Norway) Rosenborg	2–0	1–1

=== UEFA Europa League ===
==== Qualifying phase and play-off round (Main Path) ====
===== First qualifying round =====
Team 1	Agg.	Team 2	1st leg	2nd leg
Brann (Norway)	3–4	(Republic of Ireland) Shamrock Rovers	2–2	1–2
Cliftonville (Northern Ireland)	1–6	(Norway) Haugesund	0–1	1–5
Molde (Norway)	7–1	(Iceland) KR	7–1	0–0

===== Second qualifying round =====
Team 1	Agg.	Team 2	1st leg	2nd leg
Haugesund (Norway)	3–2	(Austria) Sturm Graz	2–0	1–2
Molde (Norway)	3–1	(Serbia) Čukarički	0–0	3–1

===== Third qualifying round =====
Team 1	Agg.	Team 2	1st leg	2nd leg
Haugesund (Norway)	0–1	(Netherlands) PSV Eindhoven	0–1	0–0
Molde (Norway)	4–3	(Greece) Aris	3–0	1–3 (a.e.t.)

===== Play-off round =====
Team 1	Agg.	Team 2	1st leg	2nd leg
Partizan (Serbia)	3–2	(Norway) Molde	2–1	1–1

==== Group stage ====
===== Group D =====
Pos	Team	Pld	W	D	L	GF	GA	GD	Pts	Qualification	LASK	SPO	PSV	ROS
1	(Austria) LASK	6	4	1	1	11	4	+7	13	Advance to knockout phase	—	3–0	4–1	1–0
2	(Portugal) Sporting CP	6	4	0	2	11	7	+4	12	Advance to knockout phase	2–1	—	4–0	1–0
3	(Netherlands) PSV Eindhoven	6	2	2	2	9	12	−3	8		0–0	3–2	—	1–1
4	(Norway) Rosenborg	6	0	1	5	3	11	−8	1		1–2	0–2	1–4	—

Source: UEFA

=== UEFA Women's Champions League ===
==== 2018–19 ====
===== Knockout phase =====
====== Quarter-finals ======
The tournament continued from the 2018 season.

Team 1	Agg.	Team 2	1st leg	2nd leg
Barcelona (Spain)	4–0	(Norway) LSK Kvinner	3–0	1–0

==== 2019–20 ====
===== Qualifying round =====
====== Group 8 ======
Pos	Team	Pld	W	D	L	GF	GA	GD	Pts	Qualification
1	(Belgium) Anderlecht (H)	3	3	0	0	11	3	+8	9	Knockout phase
2	(Norway) LSK Kvinner	3	2	0	1	7	3	+4	6	
3	(Northern Ireland) Linfield	3	1	0	2	4	9	−5	3	
4	(Greece) PAOK	3	0	0	3	2	9	−7	0	

Source: UEFA
Rules for classification: Tiebreakers
(H) Hosts

== National teams ==
=== Norway men's national football team ===
==== UEFA Euro 2020 qualifying ====
===== Group F =====
Pos	Team	Pld	W	D	L	GF	GA	GD	Pts	Qualification	(Spain)	(Sweden)	(Norway)	(Romania)	(Faroe Islands)	(Malta)
1	Spain	10	8	2	0	31	5	+26	26	Qualify for final tournament	—	3–0	2–1	5–0	4–0	7–0
2	Sweden	10	6	3	1	23	9	+14	21	Qualify for final tournament	1–1	—	1–1	2–1	3–0	3–0
3	Norway	10	4	5	1	19	11	+8	17	Advance to play-offs via Nations League	1–1	3–3	—	2–2	4–0	2–0
4	Romania	10	4	2	4	17	15	+2	14	Advance to play-offs via Nations League	1–2	0–2	1–1	—	4–1	1–0
5	Faroe Islands	10	1	0	9	4	30	−26	3 (Note: Tied on head-to-head points (3) and head-to-head goal difference (0). Head-to-head away goals: Faroe Islands 1, Malta 0.)		1–4	0–4	0–2	0–3	—	1–0
6	Malta	10	1	0	9	3	27	−24	3		0–2	0–4	1–2	0–4	2–1	—

Source: UEFA
Rules for classification: Qualification tiebreakers
Notes:

23 March 2019 UEFA Euro 2020 qualifying	Spain	2–1	Norway	Valencia, Spain
20:45 (UTC+1)	Rodrigo 16'; Ramos 71' (pen.)	Report	King 65' (pen.)	Stadium: Mestalla Stadium; Attendance: 39,752; Referee: Andris Treimanis (Latvia)

26 March 2019 UEFA Euro 2020 qualifying	Norway	3–3	Sweden	Oslo, Norway
20:45 (UTC+1)	Johnsen 41'; King 59'; Kamara 90+7'	Report	Claesson 70'; Quaison 86', 90+1'	Stadium: Ullevaal Stadion; Attendance: 23,439; Referee: Gianluca Rocchi (Italy)

7 June 2019 UEFA Euro 2020 qualifying	Norway	2–2	Romania	Oslo, Norway
20:45 (UTC+2)	T. Elyounoussi 56'; Ødegaard 70'	Report	Keșerü 77', 90+2'	Stadium: Ullevaal Stadion; Attendance: 17,664; Referee: Sergei Karasev (Russia)

10 June 2019 UEFA Euro 2020 qualifying	Faroe Islands	0–2	Norway	Tórshavn, Faroe Islands
20:45 (UTC+2)		Report	Johnsen 49', 84'	Stadium: Tórsvøllur; Attendance: 3,083; Referee: Donatas Rumšas (Lithuania)

5 September 2019 UEFA Euro 2020 qualifying	Norway	2–0	Malta	Oslo, Norway
20:45 (UTC+2)	Berge 34'; King 45+1' (pen.)	Report		Stadium: Ullevaal Stadion; Referee: Dumitri Muntean (Moldova)

8 September 2019 UEFA Euro 2020 qualifying	Sweden	1–1	Norway	Stockholm, Sweden
20:45 (UTC+2)	Forsberg 60'	Report	Johansen 45'	Stadium: Friends Arena; Referee: Slavko Vinčić (Slovenia)

12 October 2019 UEFA Euro 2020 qualifying	Norway	1–1	Spain	Oslo, Norway
20:45 (UTC+2)	King 90+4' (pen.)	Report	Saúl 47'	Stadium: Ullevaal Stadion; Referee: Michael Oliver (England)

15 October 2019 UEFA Euro 2020 qualifying	Romania	1–1	Norway	Bucharest, Romania
20:45 (UTC+2)	Mitriță 62'	Report	Sørloth 90+2'	Stadium: Arena Națională; Attendance: 29,854; Referee: Bobby Madden (Scotland)

15 November 2019 UEFA Euro 2020 qualifying	Norway	4–0	Faroe Islands	Oslo, Norway
18:00 (UTC+1)	Reginiussen 4'; Fossum 8'; Sørloth 62', 65'	Report		Stadium: Ullevaal Stadion; Attendance: 10,400; Referee: Fran Jović (Croatia)

18 November 2019 UEFA Euro 2020 qualifying	Malta	1–2	Norway	Ta' Qali, Malta
20:45 (UTC+1)	Fenech 40'	Report	King 7'; Sørloth 62'	Stadium: National Stadium; Attendance: 2,708; Referee: Aliyar Aghayev (Azerbaijan)

=== Norway women's national football team ===
==== Friendlies ====
17 January 2019 Friendly	Scotland	1–3	Norway	Cartagena, Spain
19:00	Weir 54' (pen.)	Report	Hansen 11', 74'; Utland 14'	Stadium: La Manga Stadium; Referee: Marta Frías (Spain)

22 January 2019 Friendly	Canada	1–0	Norway	Cartagena, Spain
19:00	Sinclair 66'	Report		Stadium: La Manga Stadium

9 April 2019 Friendly	Norway	0–1	New Zealand	Marbella, Spain
18:00		Report	Rosie White 5'	Stadium: Marbella Football Center

2 June 2019 Friendly	Norway	7–2	South Africa	Amiens, France
18:00	Herlovsen 22' 43' 53'; Utland 19' 21'; Bøe Risa 7'; Nautnes 84'	Report	Biyana 52'; Mthandi 66'	Stadium: Stadium Moulonguet

==== 2019 Algarve Cup ====
===== Group C =====
Pos	Team	Pld	W	D	L	GF	GA	GD	Pts
1	Norway	2	2	0	0	5	2	+3	6
2	Denmark	2	1	0	1	2	2	0	3
3	China	2	0	0	2	1	4	−3	0

Updated to match(es) played on 4 March 2019. Source: FPT
Rules for classification: Tiebreakers

===== Final =====
6 March 2019
18:00

Poland	0–3	Norway
	Report	Herlovsen 24'; Hansen 65'; Sævik 74'

Bela Vista Municipal Stadium, Parchal

==== 2019 FIFA Women's World Cup ====
===== Group A =====
Pos	Team	Pld	W	D	L	GF	GA	GD	Pts	Qualification	FRA	NOR	NGA	KOR
1	France (H)	3	3	0	0	7	1	+6	9	Advance to knockout stage	—			
2	Norway	3	2	0	1	6	3	+3	6	Advance to knockout stage		—		
3	Nigeria	3	1	0	2	2	4	−2	3	Advance to knockout stage			—	
4	South Korea	3	0	0	3	1	8	−7	0					—

Source: FIFA
Rules for classification: Group stage tiebreakers
(H) Hosts

8 June 2019 2019 Women's World Cup – GS	Norway	3–0	Nigeria	Reims, France
21:00	Reiten 17'; Utland 34'; Ohale 37' (o.g.)	Report		Stadium: Stade Auguste-Delaune; Attendance: 11,058; Referee: Kate Jacewicz (Australia)

12 June 2019 2019 Women's World Cup – GS	France	2–1	Norway	Nice, France
21:00	Gauvin 46'; Le Sommer 72' (pen.)	Report	Renard 54' (o.g.)	Stadium: Allianz Riviera; Attendance: 34,872; Referee: Bibiana Steinhaus (Germany)

17 June 2019 2019 Women's World Cup – GS	South Korea	1–2	Norway	Reims, France
21:00	Yeo Min-ji 78'	Report	C. Hansen 4' (pen.); Herlovsen 50' (pen.)	Stadium: Stade Auguste-Delaune; Attendance: 13,034; Referee: Marie-Soleil Beaudoin (Canada)

===== Knockout stage =====
22 June 2019 2019 Women's World Cup – R16	Norway	1–1 (a.e.t.) (4–1 p)	Australia	Nice, France
21:00	Herlovsen 31'	Report	Kellond-Knight 83'	Stadium: Allianz Riviera; Attendance: 12,229; Referee: Riem Hussein (Germany)
	Penalties
	C. Hansen (penalty scored); Reiten (penalty scored); Mjelde (penalty scored); Ingrid Engen (penalty scored)		(penalty missed) Kerr; (penalty missed) Gielnik; (penalty scored) Catley

27 June 2019 2019 Women's World Cup – QF	Norway	0–3	England	Le Havre, France
21:00		Report	Scott 3'; White 40'; Bronze 57'	Stadium: Stade Océane; Attendance: 21,111; Referee: Lucila Venegas (Mexico)

==== UEFA Women's Euro 2021 qualifying ====
===== Group C =====
Pos	Team	Pld	W	D	L	GF	GA	GD	Pts	Qualification	Norway		Wales	Belarus	Faroe Islands
1	Norway	6	6	0	0	34	1	+33	18	Final tournament	—	6–0	1–0	Canc.	Canc.
2	Northern Ireland	8	4	2	2	17	17	0	14 (Note: Ranked on head-to-head away goals: Northern Ireland 2; Wales 0.)	Play-offs	0–6	—	0–0	3–2	5–1
3	Wales	8	4	2	2	16	4	+12	14		0–1	2–2	—	3–0	4–0
4	Belarus	7	2	0	5	11	15	−4	6		1–7	0–1	0–1	—	6–0
5	Faroe Islands	7	0	0	7	1	42	−41	0		0–13	0–6	0–6	0–2	—

Source: UEFA
Notes:

30 August 2019 UEFA Women's Euro 2021 qualifying	Northern Ireland	0–6	Norway	Belfast, Northern Ireland
20:45		Report	Reiten 5'; Graham Hansen 16', 63', 72'; Eikeland 57'	Stadium: Seaview; Attendance: 3,000; Referee: Veronika Kovarova (Czech Republic)

4 October 2019 UEFA Women's Euro 2021 qualifying	Belarus	1–7	Norway	Barysaw, Belarus
17:45	Shcherbachenia 18'	Report	Herlovsen 36', 40'; Thorisdottir 45'; Reiten 60'; Graham Hansen 71', 89'; Utland 87'	Stadium: Borisov Arena; Referee: Simona Ghisletta (Switzerland)

8 October 2019 UEFA Women's Euro 2021 qualifying	Faroe Islands	0–13	Norway	Tórshavn, Faroe Islands
18:00		Report	Utland 8'; Graham Hansen 23' (pen.), 40', 52'; Eikeland 36'; Herlovsen 53', 66', 77'; Sævik 60'; Engen 63', 76'; Maanum 65'; Thorsnes 85'	Stadium: Tórsvøllur; Referee: Galiya Echeva (Bulgaria)

8 November 2019 UEFA Women's Euro 2021 qualifying	Norway	6–0	Northern Ireland	Stavanger, Norway
18:00	Utland 5', 12'; Reiten 51'; Engen 57'; Graham Hansen 70', 90+2'	Report		Stadium: Viking Stadion; Attendance: 6, 709; Referee: Melis Özçiğdem (Turkey)
