= 2018 in Norwegian football =

Football in Norway
- Season: 2018

Men's football
- Eliteserien: Rosenborg
- 1. divisjon: Viking
- 2. divisjon: Raufoss (Group 1); Skeid (Group 2)
- Cupen: Rosenborg
- Mesterfinalen: Rosenborg

Women's football
- Toppserien: LSK Kvinner
- 1. divisjon: Fart
- Cupen: LSK Kvinner

The 2018 season was the 113th season of competitive football in Norway.

The season began in March, and ended in December with the 2018 Norwegian Football Cup Final.

== Men's football ==
=== League season ===
==== Promotion and relegation ====
League	Promoted to league	Relegated from league
Eliteserien	Bodø/Glimt; Start; Ranheim	Sogndal; Aalesund; Viking
1. divisjon	HamKam; Nest-Sotra; Notodden	Fredrikstad; Elverum; Arendal
2. divisjon	Moss; Stabæk 2; Fløy; Brattvåg; Stjørdals-Blink; Mjølner	Finnsnes; Brumunddal; Follo; Vindbjart; Fana; Byåsen

==== Eliteserien ====
Pos	Team	Pld	W	D	L	GF	GA	GD	Pts	Qualification or relegation
1	Rosenborg (C)	30	19	7	4	51	24	+27	64	Qualification for the Champions League first qualifying round (Note: Since the winners of the 2018 Norwegian Cup (Rosenborg) qualified for European competition based on league position, the spot awarded to the cup winners (Europa League first qualifying round) was passed to the second-placed team, while the spot awarded to the second-placed team (Europa League first qualifying round) was passed to the fourth-placed team.)
2	Molde	30	18	5	7	63	36	+27	59	Qualification for the Europa League first qualifying round
3	Brann	30	17	7	6	45	31	+14	58	Qualification for the Europa League first qualifying round
4	Haugesund	30	16	5	9	45	33	+12	53	Qualification for the Europa League first qualifying round
5	Kristiansund	30	13	7	10	46	41	+5	46	
6	Vålerenga	30	11	9	10	39	44	−5	42	
7	Ranheim	30	12	6	12	43	50	−7	42	
8	Sarpsborg 08	30	11	8	11	46	39	+7	41	
9	Odd	30	11	7	12	39	38	+1	40	
10	Tromsø	30	11	3	16	41	48	−7	36	
11	Bodø/Glimt	30	6	14	10	32	35	−3	32	
12	Lillestrøm	30	7	11	12	34	44	−10	32	
13	Strømsgodset	30	7	10	13	46	48	−2	31	
14	Stabæk (O)	30	6	11	13	37	50	−13	29	Qualification for the relegation play-offs
15	Start (R)	30	8	5	17	30	54	−24	29	Relegation to First Division
16	Sandefjord (R)	30	4	11	15	35	57	−22	23	Relegation to First Division

Source: Football Association of Norway (in Norwegian), Soccerway
Rules for classification: 1) Points; 2) Goal difference; 3) Goals scored; 4) Head-to-head points; 5) Head-to-head goal difference; 6) Head-to-head away goals scored (only if between two teams); 7) Head-to-head goals scored; 8) Play-off (only used to decide champions or relegation).
(C) Champions; (O) Play-off winners; (R) Relegated

==== 1. divisjon ====
Pos	Team	Pld	W	D	L	GF	GA	GD	Pts	Promotion, qualification or relegation
1	Viking (C, P)	30	20	1	9	68	44	+24	61	Promotion to Eliteserien
2	Mjøndalen (P)	30	17	9	4	49	24	+25	60	Promotion to Eliteserien
3	Aalesund	30	18	5	7	58	31	+27	59	Qualification for the promotion play-offs
4	Sogndal	30	15	6	9	47	31	+16	51	Qualification for the promotion play-offs
5	Ull/Kisa	30	11	10	9	59	49	+10	43	Qualification for the promotion play-offs
6	Nest-Sotra	30	12	7	11	43	41	+2	43	Qualification for the promotion play-offs
7	Tromsdalen	30	12	7	11	43	47	−4	43	
8	Kongsvinger	30	12	6	12	59	49	+10	42	
9	HamKam	30	12	6	12	46	44	+2	42	
10	Sandnes Ulf	30	11	9	10	43	47	−4	42	
11	Strømmen	30	12	2	16	49	53	−4	38	
12	Notodden	30	10	6	14	36	40	−4	36	
13	Jerv	30	8	11	11	31	41	−10	35	
14	Åsane (R)	30	9	6	15	38	57	−19	33	Qualification for the relegation play-offs
15	Florø (R)	30	8	3	19	27	59	−32	27	Relegation to Second Division
16	Levanger (R)	30	3	6	21	32	71	−39	15	Relegation to Second Division

Source: nifs.no (in Norwegian), Soccerway
Rules for classification: 1) Points; 2) Goal difference; 3) Goals scored; 4) Head-to-head points; 5) Head-to-head goal difference; 6) Head-to-head away goals scored (only if between two teams); 7) Head-to-head goals scored; 8) Play-off (only used to decide champions or relegation).
(C) Champions; (P) Promoted; (R) Relegated

==== 2. divisjon ====
===== Group 1 =====
Pos	Team	Pld	W	D	L	GF	GA	GD	Pts	Promotion, qualification or relegation
1	Raufoss (C, P)	26	16	5	5	64	30	+34	53	Promotion to First Division
2	Fredrikstad	26	15	7	4	53	25	+28	52	Qualification for the promotion play-offs
3	Grorud	26	14	6	6	46	31	+15	48	
4	Asker	26	14	3	9	53	31	+22	45	
5	Alta	26	14	3	9	39	28	+11	45	
6	Elverum	26	12	8	6	53	39	+14	44	
7	Mjølner	26	13	5	8	41	41	0	44	
8	Bærum	26	12	4	10	44	33	+11	40	
9	Moss	26	7	9	10	37	42	−5	30	
10	Fram Larvik	26	9	2	15	40	57	−17	29	
11	Odd 2	26	6	4	16	35	52	−17	22	
12	Nybergsund (R)	26	5	6	15	26	58	−32	21	Relegation to Third Division
13	Hønefoss (R)	26	5	5	16	38	67	−29	20	Relegation to Third Division
14	Stabæk 2 (R)	26	3	7	16	34	69	−35	16	Relegation to Third Division

Source: nifs.no (in Norwegian)
Rules for classification: 1) Points; 2) Goal difference; 3) Goals scored; 4) Head-to-head points; 5) Head-to-head goal difference; 6) Head-to-head away goals scored (only if between two teams); 7) Head-to-head goals scored; 8) Play-off (only used to decide champions or relegation).
(C) Champions; (P) Promoted; (R) Relegated

===== Group 2 =====
Pos	Team	Pld	W	D	L	GF	GA	GD	Pts	Promotion, qualification or relegation
1	Skeid (C, P)	26	17	5	4	59	25	+34	56	Promotion to First Division
2	KFUM Oslo (O, P)	26	13	8	5	47	32	+15	47	Qualification for the promotion play-offs
3	Hødd	26	13	8	5	43	30	+13	47	
4	Egersund	26	12	8	6	47	28	+19	44	
5	Bryne	26	11	8	7	45	38	+7	41	
6	Arendal	26	10	6	10	37	34	+3	36	
7	Kjelsås	26	9	8	9	38	36	+2	35	
8	Brattvåg	26	11	2	13	37	51	−14	35	
9	Vidar	26	10	3	13	41	51	−10	33	
10	Nardo	26	8	7	11	33	44	−11	31	
11	Stjørdals-Blink	26	7	7	12	39	48	−9	28	
12	Fløy (R)	26	7	7	12	39	55	−16	28	Relegation to Third Division
13	Vålerenga 2 (R)	26	6	8	12	54	62	−8	26	Relegation to Third Division
14	Vard Haugesund (R)	26	3	5	18	31	56	−25	14	Relegation to Third Division

Source: nifs.no (in Norwegian)
Rules for classification: 1) Points; 2) Goal difference; 3) Goals scored; 4) Head-to-head points; 5) Head-to-head goal difference; 6) Head-to-head away goals scored (only if between two teams); 7) Head-to-head goals scored; 8) Play-off (only used to decide champions or relegation).
(C) Champions; (O) Play-off winners; (P) Promoted; (R) Relegated

==== 3. divisjon ====
===== Group 1 =====
Pos	Team	Pld	W	D	L	GF	GA	GD	Pts	Promotion or relegation
1	Oppsal (P)	26	21	4	1	85	17	+68	67	Promotion to Second Division
2	Træff	26	15	8	3	65	37	+28	53	
3	Molde 2	26	17	2	7	66	42	+24	53	
4	Spjelkavik	26	12	4	10	55	46	+9	40	
5	Lokomotiv Oslo	26	12	4	10	42	35	+7	40	
6	Follo	26	9	8	9	39	47	−8	35	
7	Herd	26	10	4	12	46	48	−2	34	
8	Drøbak/Frogn	26	11	1	14	48	62	−14	34	
9	Ullern	26	10	3	13	58	54	+4	33	
10	Ready	26	9	5	12	43	53	−10	32	
11	Rilindja (R)	26	9	4	13	42	65	−23	31	Relegation to Fourth Division
12	Kristiansund 2 (R)	26	6	6	14	48	67	−19	24	Relegation to Fourth Division
13	KFUM 2 (R)	26	6	6	14	41	60	−19	24	Relegation to Fourth Division
14	Hødd 2 (R)	26	3	5	18	34	79	−45	14	Relegation to Fourth Division

Source: fotball.no (in Norwegian)
Rules for classification: 1) Points; 2) Goal difference; 3) Goals scored; 4) Head-to-head points; 5) Head-to-head goal difference; 6) Head-to-head away goals scored (only if between two teams); 7) Head-to-head goals scored; 8) Play-off (only used to decide champions or relegation).
(P) Promoted; (R) Relegated

===== Group 2 =====
Pos	Team	Pld	W	D	L	GF	GA	GD	Pts	Promotion or relegation
1	Kvik Halden (P)	26	20	3	3	65	16	+49	63	Promotion to Second Division
2	Eidsvold Turn	26	18	6	2	67	20	+47	60	
3	Lørenskog	26	17	4	5	58	34	+24	55	
4	Strømsgodset 2	26	16	1	9	82	35	+47	49	
5	Kråkerøy	26	12	6	8	40	34	+6	42	
6	Gjelleråsen	26	11	7	8	55	48	+7	40	
7	Valdres	26	12	2	12	52	46	+6	38	
8	Lillestrøm 2	26	11	4	11	54	46	+8	37	
9	Vestfossen	26	11	2	13	48	53	−5	35	
10	Skjetten	26	8	4	14	39	60	−21	28	
11	Bjørnevatn (R)	26	6	4	16	23	61	−38	22	Relegation to Fourth Division
12	Skedsmo (R)	26	5	6	15	29	50	−21	21	Relegation to Fourth Division
13	Østsiden (R)	26	4	9	13	35	68	−33	21	Relegation to Fourth Division
14	Selbak (R)	26	0	4	22	24	100	−76	4	Relegation to Fourth Division

Source: fotball.no (in Norwegian)
Rules for classification: 1) Points; 2) Goal difference; 3) Goals scored; 4) Head-to-head points; 5) Head-to-head goal difference; 6) Head-to-head away goals scored (only if between two teams); 7) Head-to-head goals scored; 8) Play-off (only used to decide champions or relegation).
(P) Promoted; (R) Relegated

===== Group 3 =====
Pos	Team	Pld	W	D	L	GF	GA	GD	Pts	Promotion or relegation
1	Sola (P)	26	17	4	5	65	31	+34	55	Promotion to Second Division
2	Ørn-Horten	26	15	7	4	66	24	+42	52	
3	Vindbjart	26	15	2	9	58	48	+10	47	
4	Tønsberg	26	13	7	6	54	30	+24	46	
5	Donn	26	12	5	9	63	48	+15	41	
6	Halsen	26	12	4	10	55	42	+13	40	
7	Pors	26	11	4	11	58	51	+7	37	
8	Staal Jørpeland	26	10	7	9	52	46	+6	37	
9	Start 2	26	10	6	10	63	50	+13	36	
10	Madla	26	10	6	10	46	49	−3	36	
11	Sandefjord 2 (R)	26	10	3	13	51	53	−2	33	Relegation to Fourth Division
12	Urædd (R)	26	8	3	15	41	53	−12	27	Relegation to Fourth Division
13	Åssiden (R)	26	4	4	18	30	84	−54	16	Relegation to Fourth Division
14	Egersund 2 (R)	26	3	2	21	24	117	−93	11	Relegation to Fourth Division

Source: fotball.no (in Norwegian)
Rules for classification: 1) Points; 2) Goal difference; 3) Goals scored; 4) Head-to-head points; 5) Head-to-head goal difference; 6) Head-to-head away goals scored (only if between two teams); 7) Head-to-head goals scored; 8) Play-off (only used to decide champions or relegation).
(P) Promoted; (R) Relegated

===== Group 4 =====
Pos	Team	Pld	W	D	L	GF	GA	GD	Pts	Promotion or relegation
1	Sotra (P)	26	17	5	4	80	32	+48	56	Promotion to Second Division
2	Fyllingsdalen	26	17	3	6	63	31	+32	54	
3	Lysekloster	26	16	4	6	75	30	+45	52	
4	Viking 2	26	14	4	8	77	44	+33	46	
5	Brodd	26	13	4	9	66	47	+19	43	
6	Brann 2	26	13	3	10	72	50	+22	42	
7	Fana	26	13	1	12	49	44	+5	40	
8	Vardeneset	26	11	4	11	52	64	−12	37	
9	Sogndal 2	26	11	1	14	53	68	−15	34	
10	Stord	26	8	6	12	51	62	−11	30	
11	Tertnes (R)	26	9	3	14	39	68	−29	30	Relegation to Fourth Division
12	Øystese (R)	26	7	3	16	39	75	−36	24	Relegation to Fourth Division
13	Førde (R)	26	4	8	14	32	68	−36	20	Relegation to Fourth Division
14	Varegg (R)	26	3	3	20	18	83	−65	12	Relegation to Fourth Division

Source: nifs.no (in Norwegian)
Rules for classification: 1) Points; 2) Goal difference; 3) Goals scored; 4) Head-to-head points; 5) Head-to-head goal difference; 6) Head-to-head away goals scored (only if between two teams); 7) Head-to-head goals scored; 8) Play-off (only used to decide champions or relegation).
(P) Promoted; (R) Relegated

===== Group 5 =====
Pos	Team	Pld	W	D	L	GF	GA	GD	Pts	Promotion or relegation
1	Byåsen (P)	26	18	4	4	66	25	+41	58	Promotion to Second Division
2	Rosenborg 2	26	15	7	4	80	35	+45	52	
3	Tillerbyen	26	12	7	7	49	34	+15	43	
4	Brumunddal	26	11	10	5	43	32	+11	43	
5	Verdal	26	10	7	9	31	37	−6	37	
6	Orkla	26	11	2	13	51	56	−5	35	
7	Gjøvik-Lyn	26	10	5	11	39	48	−9	35	
8	Steinkjer	26	10	4	12	48	46	+2	34	
9	Melhus	26	9	7	10	42	44	−2	34	
10	Kolstad	26	9	6	11	51	63	−12	33	
11	Levanger 2 (R)	26	9	4	13	48	65	−17	31	Relegation to Fourth Division
12	Tynset (R)	26	8	4	14	45	48	−3	28	Relegation to Fourth Division
13	Løten (R)	26	7	7	12	35	58	−23	28	Relegation to Fourth Division
14	Ottestad (R)	26	4	4	18	32	69	−37	16	Relegation to Fourth Division

Source: nifs.no (in Norwegian)
Rules for classification: 1) Points; 2) Goal difference; 3) Goals scored; 4) Head-to-head points; 5) Head-to-head goal difference; 6) Head-to-head away goals scored (only if between two teams); 7) Head-to-head goals scored; 8) Play-off (only used to decide champions or relegation).
(P) Promoted; (R) Relegated

===== Group 6 =====
Pos	Team	Pld	W	D	L	GF	GA	GD	Pts	Promotion or relegation
1	Senja (P)	26	18	4	4	63	23	+40	58	Promotion to Second Division
2	Frigg	26	16	7	3	64	14	+50	55	
3	Lyn	26	17	2	7	74	40	+34	53	
4	Fløya	26	14	5	7	56	35	+21	47	
5	Junkeren	26	13	7	6	76	42	+34	46	
6	Harstad	26	13	3	10	57	52	+5	42	
7	Grei	26	12	4	10	47	39	+8	40	
8	Finnsnes	26	8	10	8	41	34	+7	34	
9	Skjervøy	26	8	5	13	49	55	−6	29	
10	Melbo	26	8	4	14	36	61	−25	28	
11	Skarp (R)	26	6	9	11	49	57	−8	27	Relegation to Fourth Division
12	Korsvoll (R)	26	6	4	16	28	56	−28	22	Relegation to Fourth Division
13	Stålkameratene (R)	26	4	4	18	38	94	−56	16	Relegation to Fourth Division
14	Sortland (R)	26	3	4	19	28	104	−76	13	Relegation to Fourth Division

Source: nifs.no (in Norwegian)
Rules for classification: 1) Points; 2) Goal difference; 3) Goals scored; 4) Head-to-head points; 5) Head-to-head goal difference; 6) Head-to-head away goals scored (only if between two teams); 7) Head-to-head goals scored; 8) Play-off (only used to decide champions or relegation).
(P) Promoted; (R) Relegated

=== Cup competitions ===
==== Norwegian Cup ====
===== Final =====
2 December 2018
13:15 CET (UTC+1)

Rosenborg	4–1	Strømsgodset
Jensen 18'; Konradsen 40'; Bendtner 52', 90+4'	Report	Abdellaoue 13'

Ullevaal Stadion, Oslo
Attendance: 22,182
Referee: Trond Ivar Døvle (Fjellhamar)

==== Mesterfinalen ====
26 April 2018
18:30 CEST

Lillestrøm	0–1	Rosenborg
	Report	Bendtner 52'

Åråsen Stadion, Lillestrøm
Attendance: 4,295
Referee: Tom Harald Hagen (Grue)

== Women's football ==
=== League season ===
==== Promotion and relegation ====
League	Promoted to league	Relegated from league
Toppserien	Lyn	Medkila
1. divisjon	Kaupanger; Nanset	KIL/Hemne; Kongsvinger

==== Toppserien ====
Pos	Team	Pld	W	D	L	GF	GA	GD	Pts	Qualification or relegation
1	LSK Kvinner (C)	22	20	1	1	71	15	+56	61	Qualification for the Champions League qualifying round
2	Klepp	22	15	3	4	39	21	+18	48	
3	Arna-Bjørnar	22	11	6	5	53	26	+27	39	
4	Sandviken	22	11	6	5	42	29	+13	39	
5	Kolbotn	22	11	6	5	34	35	−1	39	
6	Vålerenga	22	10	3	9	37	35	+2	33	
7	Røa	22	10	2	10	42	42	0	31 (Note: Røa was deducted one point.)	
8	Stabæk	22	7	2	13	29	37	−8	23	
9	Avaldsnes	22	5	6	11	24	38	−14	21	
10	Trondheims-Ørn	22	4	6	12	25	48	−23	18	
11	Lyn (O)	22	3	3	16	27	56	−29	12	Qualification for relegation play-offs
12	Grand Bodø (R)	22	2	2	18	20	61	−41	8	Relegation to First Division

Source: Norges Fotballforbund (in Norwegian)
Rules for classification: 1) Points; 2) Goal difference; 3) Number of goals scored; 4) Head-to-head points; 5) Head-to-head goal difference; 6) Head-to-head away goals scored
(C) Champions; (O) Play-off winners; (R) Relegated

=== Norwegian Women's Cup ===
==== Final ====
- LSK Kvinner 4–0 Sandviken

== UEFA competitions ==
=== UEFA Champions League ===
==== Qualifying phase ====
===== First qualifying round =====
Team 1	Agg.	Team 2	1st leg	2nd leg
Valur (Iceland)	2–3	(Norway) Rosenborg	1–0	1–3

===== Second qualifying round =====
Team 1	Agg.	Team 2	1st leg	2nd leg
Celtic (Scotland)	3–1	(Norway) Rosenborg	3–1	0–0

=== UEFA Europa League ===
==== Qualifying phase and play-off round (Champions path) ====
===== Third qualifying round =====
Team 1	Agg.	Team 2	1st leg	2nd leg
Cork City (Republic of Ireland)	0–5	(Norway) Rosenborg	0–2	0–3

===== Play-off round =====
Team 1	Agg.	Team 2	1st leg	2nd leg
Rosenborg (Norway)	5–1	(North Macedonia) Shkëndija	3–1	2–0

==== Qualifying phase and play-off round (Main Path) ====
===== First qualifying round =====
Team 1	Agg.	Team 2	1st leg	2nd leg
Glenavon (Northern Ireland)	3–6	(Norway) Molde	2–1	1–5
ÍBV (Iceland)	0–6	(Norway) Sarpsborg 08	0–4	0–2

===== Second qualifying round =====
Team 1	Agg.	Team 2	1st leg	2nd leg
Molde (Norway)	5–0	(Albania) Laçi	3–0	2–0
LASK Linz (Austria)	6–1	(Norway) Lillestrøm	4–0	2–1
St. Gallen (Switzerland)	2–2 (a)	(Norway) Sarpsborg 08	2–1	0–1

===== Third qualifying round =====
Team 1	Agg.	Team 2	1st leg	2nd leg
Sarpsborg 08 (Norway)	2–1	(Croatia) Rijeka	1–1	1–0
Hibernian (Scotland)	0–3	(Norway) Molde	0–0	0–3

===== Play-off round =====
Team 1	Agg.	Team 2	1st leg	2nd leg
Sarpsborg 08 (Norway)	4–3	(Israel) Maccabi Tel Aviv	3–1	1–2
Zenit Saint Petersburg (Russia)	4–3	(Norway) Molde	3–1	1–2

==== Group stage ====
===== Group B =====
Pos	Team	Pld	W	D	L	GF	GA	GD	Pts	Qualification	SAL	CEL	RBL	ROS
1	(Austria) Red Bull Salzburg	6	6	0	0	17	6	+11	18	Advance to knockout phase	—	3–1	1–0	3–0
2	(Scotland) Celtic	6	3	0	3	6	8	−2	9	Advance to knockout phase	1–2	—	2–1	1–0
3	(Germany) RB Leipzig	6	2	1	3	9	8	+1	7		2–3	2–0	—	1–1
4	(Norway) Rosenborg	6	0	1	5	4	14	−10	1		2–5	0–1	1–3	—

Source: UEFA
Rules for classification: Group stage tiebreakers

===== Group I =====
Pos	Team	Pld	W	D	L	GF	GA	GD	Pts	Qualification	GNK	MAL	BES	SRP
1	(Belgium) Genk	6	3	2	1	14	8	+6	11	Advance to knockout phase	—	2–0	1–1	4–0
2	(Sweden) Malmö FF	6	2	3	1	7	6	+1	9	Advance to knockout phase	2–2	—	2–0	1–1
3	(Turkey) Beşiktaş	6	2	1	3	9	11	−2	7		2–4	0–1	—	3–1
4	(Norway) Sarpsborg 08	6	1	2	3	8	13	−5	5		3–1	1–1	2–3	—

Source: UEFA
Rules for classification: Group stage tiebreakers

=== UEFA Women's Champions League ===
==== Qualifying round ====
===== Group 10 =====
Pos	Team	Pld	W	D	L	GF	GA	GD	Pts	Qualification	AVA	SPO	OSI	DRA
1	(Norway) Avaldsnes	3	2	1	0	8	4	+4	7	Round of 32	—	3–2	—	3–0
2	(Portugal) Sporting CP	3	2	0	1	9	3	+6	6		—	—	3–0	—
3	(Croatia) Osijek (H)	3	1	1	1	15	5	+10	4		2–2	—	—	13–0
4	(North Macedonia) Dragon 2014	3	0	0	3	0	20	−20	0		—	0–4	—	—

Source: UEFA
Rules for classification: Qualifying round tiebreakers
(H) Hosts

==== Knockout phase ====
===== Round of 32 =====
Team 1	Agg.	Team 2	1st leg	2nd leg
Avaldsnes (Norway)	0–7	(France) Lyon	0–2	0–5
LSK Kvinner (Norway)	4–0	(Russia) Zvezda-2005 Perm	3–0	1–0

===== Round of 16 =====
Team 1	Agg.	Team 2	1st leg	2nd leg
LSK Kvinner (Norway)	3–1	(Denmark) Brøndby	1–1	2–0

The tournament continued into the 2019 season.

== National teams ==
=== Norway men's national football team ===
==== Friendlies ====
Norway also participated in four friendly matches.

23 March 2018 Friendly	Norway	4–1	Australia	Oslo, Norway
18:00 CET (UTC+1)	Kamara 36', 57', 90+1'; Reginiussen 48'	Report	Irvine 19'	Stadium: Ullevaal Stadion; Attendance: 5,871; Referee: Andreas Ekberg (Sweden)

26 March 2018 Friendly	Albania	0–1	Norway	Elbasan, Albania
18:00 CEST (UTC+2)		Report	Rosted 70'	Stadium: Elbasan Arena; Attendance: 5,000; Referee: Fyodor Zammit (Malta)

2 June 2018 Friendly	Iceland	2–3	Norway	Reykjavík, Iceland
20:00 GMT (UTC±0)	Finnbogason 30' (pen.); Sigurðsson 70'	Report	Johnsen 15'; King 80'; Sørloth 85'	Stadium: Laugardalsvöllur; Attendance: 3,172; Referee: Jonas Eriksson (Sweden)

6 June 2018 Friendly	Norway	1–0	Panama	Oslo, Norway
19:00 CEST (UTC+2)	King 4'	Report		Stadium: Ullevaal Stadion; Attendance: 7,435; Referee: Serdar Gözübüyük (Netherlands)

==== 2018–19 UEFA Nations League C ====
During the season, the Norway national team played six games in the inaugural edition of the UEFA Nations League.

===== Group 3 =====
Pos	Team	Pld	W	D	L	GF	GA	GD	Pts	Promotion (Note: Due to revamp of the format for the 2020–21 UEFA Nations League, no teams were eventually relegated, and the second-placed teams in each group were also promoted.)	(Norway)	(Bulgaria)	(Cyprus)	(Slovenia)
1	Norway (P)	6	4	1	1	7	2	+5	13	Promotion to League B	—	1–0	2–0	1–0
2	Bulgaria (P)	6	3	2	1	7	5	+2	11	Promotion to League B	1–0	—	2–1	1–1
3	Cyprus	6	1	2	3	5	9	−4	5		0–2	1–1	—	2–1
4	Slovenia	6	0	3	3	5	8	−3	3		1–1	1–2	1–1	—

Source: UEFA
Rules for classification: Tiebreakers
(P) Promoted
Notes:

6 September 2018 2018–19 UEFA Nations League	Norway	2–0	Cyprus	Oslo, Norway
20:45 CEST (UTC+2)	Johansen 20', 42'	Report		Stadium: Ullevaal Stadion; Attendance: 6,172; Referee: István Kovács (Romania)

9 September 2018 2018–19 UEFA Nations League	Bulgaria	1–0	Norway	Sofia, Bulgaria
19:00 (UTC+3)	Vasilev 59'	Report		Stadium: Vasil Levski National Stadium; Attendance: 7,100; Referee: Daniel Stefański (Poland)

13 October 2018 2018–19 UEFA Nations League	Norway	1–0	Slovenia	Oslo, Norway
18:00 (UTC+2)	Selnæs 45+5'	Report		Stadium: Ullevaal Stadion; Attendance: 14,712; Referee: Daniel Siebert (Germany)

16 October 2018 2018–19 UEFA Nations League	Norway	1–0	Bulgaria	Oslo, Norway
20:45 (UTC+2)	Elyounoussi 31'	Report		Stadium: Ullevaal Stadion; Attendance: 9,523; Referee: John Beaton (Scotland)

16 November 2018 2018–19 UEFA Nations League	Slovenia	1–1	Norway	Ljubljana, Slovenia
20:45 (UTC+1)	Benjamin Verbič 9'	Report	Bjørn Maars Johnsen 86'	Stadium: Stožice Stadium; Attendance: 10,254; Referee: Ruddy Buquet (France)

19 November 2018 2018–19 UEFA Nations League	Cyprus	0–2	Norway	Nicosia, Cyprus
21:45 (UTC+2)		Report	Ola Kamara 36', 48'	Stadium: GSP Stadium; Referee: István Vad (Hungary)

=== Norway women's national football team ===
==== Friendlies ====
18 January 2018 Friendly	Norway	3–0	Scotland	La Manga Stadium, La Manga
	Isabell Herlovsen 12', 32'; Thorisdóttir 53'	Report

23 January 2018 Friendly	Norway	2–1	Iceland	La Manga Stadium, La Manga
	Jensen 42', 61'	Report	Friðriksdóttir 3'

4 October 2018 Friendly	Sweden	2–1	Norway	Olympia, Helsingborg
18:45	Schough 13'; Leine 32' (OG)	Report	Herlovsen 85'	Referee: Katalin Kulcsár (Hungary)

11 November 2018 Friendly	Japan	4–1	Norway	Tottori Bank Bird Stadium, Tottori
	Yokoyama 16'; Iwabuchi 27', 55'; Momiki 63'	Report	Gausdal 81'	Attendance: 6,185; Referee: Yu Hong (Japan)

==== 2018 Algarve Cup ====
===== Group A =====
Pos	Team	Pld	W	D	L	GF	GA	GD	Pts
1	Australia	3	2	1	0	6	3	+3	7
2	Portugal (H)	3	2	1	0	4	1	+3	7
3	Norway	3	1	0	2	5	6	−1	3
4	China	3	0	0	3	1	6	−5	0

Source: FPF
Rules for classification: Tiebreakers
(H) Hosts

28 February 2018 2018 Algarve Cup	Australia	4–3	Norway	Albufeira Municipal Stadium, Albufeira
18:30	Polkinghorne 13'; Logarzo 24'; Kerr 31'; Crummer 90+5'	Report	Thorsnes 11', 61' (pen.); Ultand 52'	Referee: Monika Mularczyk (Poland)

2 March 2018 2018 Algarve Cup	China	0–2	Norway	VRS António Sports Complex, Vila Real de Santo António
15:00		Report	Engen 25'; Mjelde 88'	Referee: Ekaterina Koroleva (United States)

5 March 2018 2018 Algarve Cup	Portugal	2–0	Norway	Estádio Algarve, São João da Venda
1:00	Neto 36'; Di. Silva 49'	Report		Referee: Monika Mularczyk (Poland)

===== Placement match =====
- 3rd placed teams

Pos	Grp	Team	Pld	W	D	L	GF	GA	GD	Pts	Qualification
1	B	South Korea	3	1	1	1	4	5	−1	4	Seventh-place match
2	A	Norway	3	1	0	2	5	6	−1	3	Seventh-place match
3	C	Iceland	3	0	2	1	1	2	−1	2	Ninth-place match

Source: FPF

===== Seventh-place match =====
7 March 2018 2018 Algarve Cup	South Korea	Abandoned	Norway	Albufeira Municipal Stadium, Albufeira
18:30				Referee: Sandra Braz Bastos (Portugal)
Note: The seventh place game was suspended during the second half with a score of 0–0, due to heavy rain and adverse weather conditions.

==== 2019 FIFA Women's World Cup qualification (UEFA) ====
===== Group 3 =====
Pos	Team	Pld	W	D	L	GF	GA	GD	Pts	Qualification	Norway	Netherlands	Ireland		Slovakia
1	Norway	8	7	0	1	22	4	+18	21	2019 FIFA Women's World Cup	—	2–1	1–0	4–1	6–1
2	Netherlands	8	6	1	1	22	2	+20	19	Play-offs	1–0	—	0–0	7–0	1–0
3	Republic of Ireland	8	4	1	3	10	6	+4	13		0–2	0–2	—	4–0	2–1
4	Northern Ireland	8	1	0	7	4	27	−23	3 (Note: Head-to-head results: Slovakia 1–3 Northern Ireland, Northern Ireland 0–1 Slovakia.)		0–3	0–5	0–2	—	0–1
5	Slovakia	8	1	0	7	4	23	−19	3		0–4	0–5	0–2	1–3	—

Source: UEFA
Rules for classification: Qualification tiebreakers
Notes:

10 April 2018 World Cup Qualifying - G3	Northern Ireland	0–3	Norway	Shamrock Park, Portadown
20:30		Report	Graham Hansen 61', 87'; Herlovsen 90+3'	Attendance: 504; Referee: Lina Lehtovaara (Finland)

8 June 2018 World Cup Qualifying - G3	Republic of Ireland	0–2	Norway	Tallaght Stadium, Dublin
18:30		Report	Utland 21', 61'	Attendance: 3,172; Referee: Kateryna Monzul (Ukraine)

12 June 2018 World Cup Qualifying - G3	Norway	1–0	Republic of Ireland	Viking Stadion, Stavanger
19:00	Graham Hansen 25' (pen.)	Report		Attendance: 3,609; Referee: Esther Staubli (Switzerland)

31 August 2018 World Cup Qualifying - G3	Slovakia	0–4	Norway	NTC Senec, Senec
20:00		Report	Utland 11', 26', 87'; Reiten 22'	Referee: Valentina Finzi (Italy)

5 September 2018 World Cup Qualifying - G3	Norway	2–1	Netherlands	Intility Arena, Oslo
17:00	Engen 5'; Herlovsen 6'	Report	Miedema 31'	Referee: Riem Hussein (Germany)
