= Kristiansund FK =

Norwegian football club

- Full name: Kristiansund Fotballklubb
- Nickname: KFK
- Founded: 7 June 1912; 113 years ago
- Ground: Kristiansund Stadion, Kristiansund
- Capacity: 4,444
- Chairman: Kenneth Leren
- Manager: Thorry Aakenes
- League: 4. divisjon
- 2019: 4. divisjon Nordmøre og Romsdal, 5th of 12
Home colours	Away colours

Kristiansund Fotballklubb is a Norwegian association football club from Kristiansund, Møre og Romsdal.

The men's football team currently plays in the Fourth Division, the fifth tier of the Norwegian football league system. The team last played in the 1. divisjon (second tier) in 1991 and in the 2. divisjon (third tier) in 1998. In 2000, they won their 3. divisjon group but lost the two-legged play-off and failed to win promotion.

In the autumn of 2003 it formed a partnership with rivals Clausenengen FK to field the team Kristiansund BK. Kristiansund BK is currently a Norwegian Eliteserien club. Despite the merger, Kristiansund continued with their first team, and was forced to relegate to 4. divisjon ahead of the 2004 season to make room for the new club in 3. divisjon.

== Recent seasons ==
Season	Division (Group)	Pos.	Pl.	W	D	L	GS	GA	Pts.	Cup	Notes
2014	4. divisjon (N&R)	↑ 1	22	19	1	2	86	32	58	dnq	Promoted to 3. divisjon
2015	3. divisjon (8)	2	26	15	2	9	64	56	47	First qualifying round	
2016	3. divisjon (8)	↓ 9	26	11	2	13	47	51	35	First round	Relegated to 4. divisjon
2017	4. divisjon (N&R)	7	22	16	2	4	106	23	50	First qualifying round	
2018	4. divisjon (N&R)	7	22	9	5	8	56	32	32	First qualifying round	
2019	4. divisjon (N&R)	5	22	10	2	10	61	52	32	First qualifying round	
