= Eidsvåg IL (Hordaland) =

Norwegian sports club

- Full name: Eidsvåg Idrettslag
- Founded: 26 October 1911
- Ground: Eidsvåg idrettsplass, Eidsvåg
- League: 5. Divisjon Hordaland 2
- 2012: Fifth Division, Hordaland 1, 9th
Home colours

Eidsvåg Idrettslag is a Norwegian football club from Eidsvåg, Åsane, Bergen.

The club was founded on 26 October 1924. The men's football team currently resides in the Fifth Division (sixth tier). It last played in the Third Division in 1992.
