= Stovner SK =

Norwegian sports club

- Full name: Stovner Sportsklubb
- Founded: 19 October 1972
- Ground: Rommensletta, Oslo
- League: 3. divisjon
Home colours

Stovner Sportsklubb is a Norwegian sports club from Stovner borough, Oslo. It has sections for association football, volleyball, and sports dancing.

The club was formed in 2021 as a merger of Vestli IL and Rommen SK. The club counts Vestli IL's founding date as its founding date but has different sports from Vestli IL as team handball was not part of the merger; and the men's football team replaced Rommen SK in the league system and uses Rommen's home ground.

The men's football team played their first official match in the 2021 Norwegian Football Cup against Grorud IL. Replacing Rommen SK in the league system, Stovner SK began playing in the 2021 3. divisjon.
