= Eidsvåg Church =

Church in Vestland, Norway

- Eidsvåg kirke
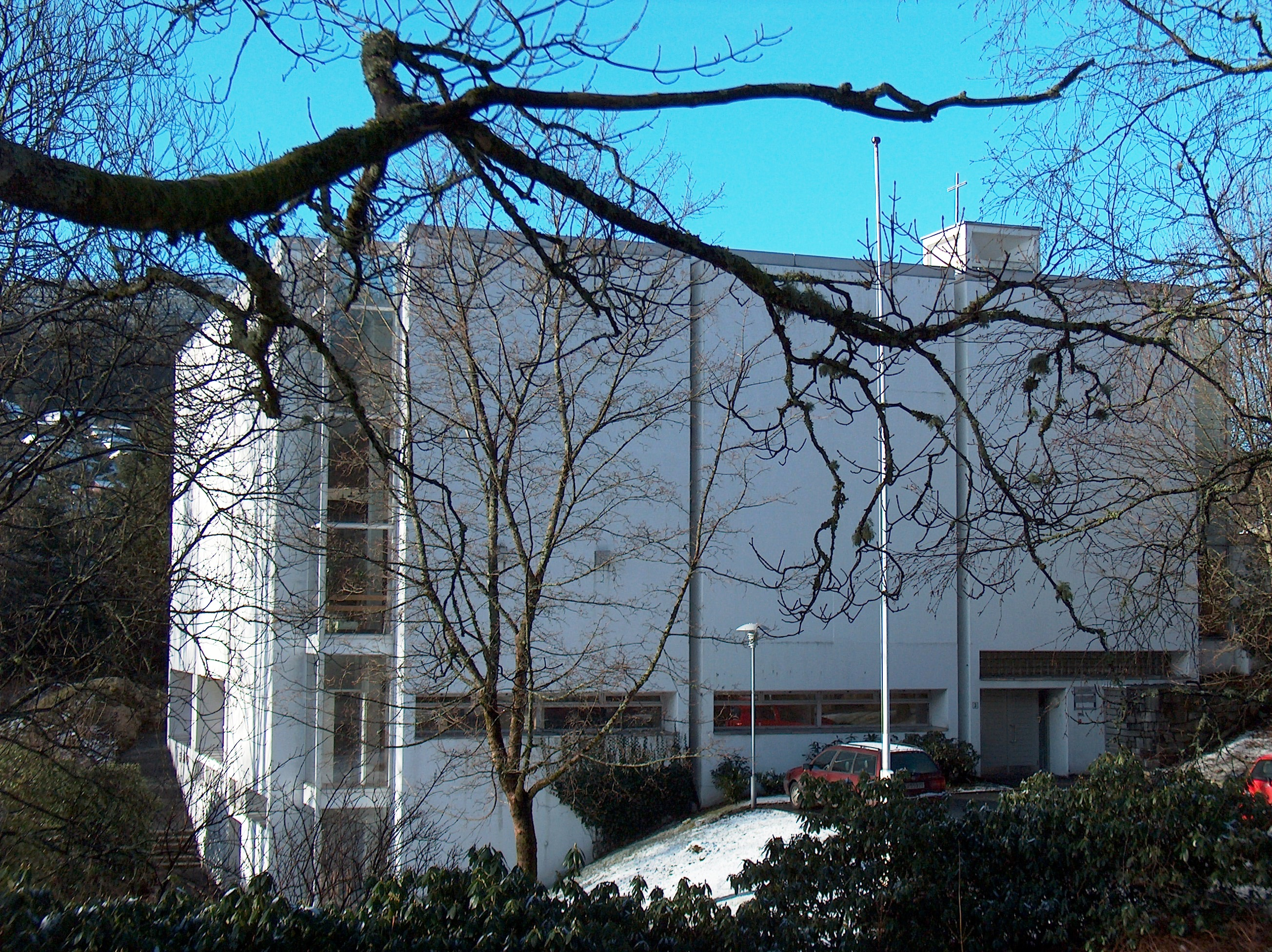
- View of the church
- Eidsvåg Church
- 60°26′19″N 5°19′03″E
- Location: Bergen Municipality, Vestland
- Country: Norway
- Denomination: Church of Norway
- Churchmanship: Evangelical Lutheran

History
- Status: Parish church
- Founded: 1981
- Consecrated: 23 May 1982

Architecture
- Functional status: Active
- Architect: Lund + Slaatto Arkitekter
- Architectural type: Rectangular
- Completed: 1981 (45 years ago)

Specifications
- Capacity: 500
- Materials: Concrete

Administration
- Diocese: Bjørgvin bispedømme
- Deanery: Åsane prosti
- Parish: Eidsvåg

Eidsvåg Church (Norwegian: Eidsvåg kirke) is a parish church of the Church of Norway in Bergen Municipality in Vestland county, Norway. It is located in the Eidsvåg neighborhood in the city of Bergen. It is the church for the Eidsvåg parish which is part of the Åsane prosti (deanery) in the Diocese of Bjørgvin. The large, white, concrete church was built in a rectangular design in 1981 using plans drawn up by the architectural firm Lund + Slaatto Arkitekter from Oslo. The church is a large cube shape, seating about 300 people, and the main sanctuary is expandable up to 500 people.

== History ==
Efforts to get a church built in Eidsvåg began in 1942, but it was a long time until this work came to fruition. In 1969, there was an architectural competition to design the new church and the firm Lund + Slaatto Arkitekter from Oslo won. In 1971, a Royal Decree was issued granting permission to construct the new church. It would be part of the Åsane Church parish as an annex church. Work did not begin right away due to the finances involved with the merger of several municipalities with Bergen. Work finally began in 1980 and the church was completed in late 1981. On 1 January 1982, the new church was split off from the Åsane Church parish and made a parish of its own. The new church was consecrated on 23 May 1982.

== See also ==
- List of churches in Bjørgvin
