= Stovnerkameratene BK =

Norwegian sports club

- Full name: Stovnerkameratene Ballklubb
- Founded: 1 November 1989
- Dissolved: 24 November 1997
- Ground: Stovnerbanen, Oslo

Stovnerkameratene Ballklubb was a Norwegian sports club from Stovner borough, Oslo.

The club was formed on 1 November 1989 as a breakaway faction of the multi-sports club IL Stovnerkameratene.

The men's football team played in 3. divisjon, the fourth tier of Norwegian football. The team was close to win promotion to 2. divisjon, finishing 2nd in their group in 1992 and third in 1994. In 1994 the team also contested the Norwegian Cup, losing in the first round to Vålerenga. However, in 1995 the team was relegated to 4. divisjon.

On 24 November 1997 the club merged with Smedstua IL to become Rommen SK.
