= Groruddalen BK =

Norwegian football club

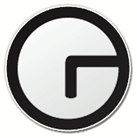
- Full name: Groruddalen Ballklubb
- Nickname(s): GBK
- Founded: 22 September 2002
- Dissolved: 2008
- Ground: Greibanen, Rødtvet

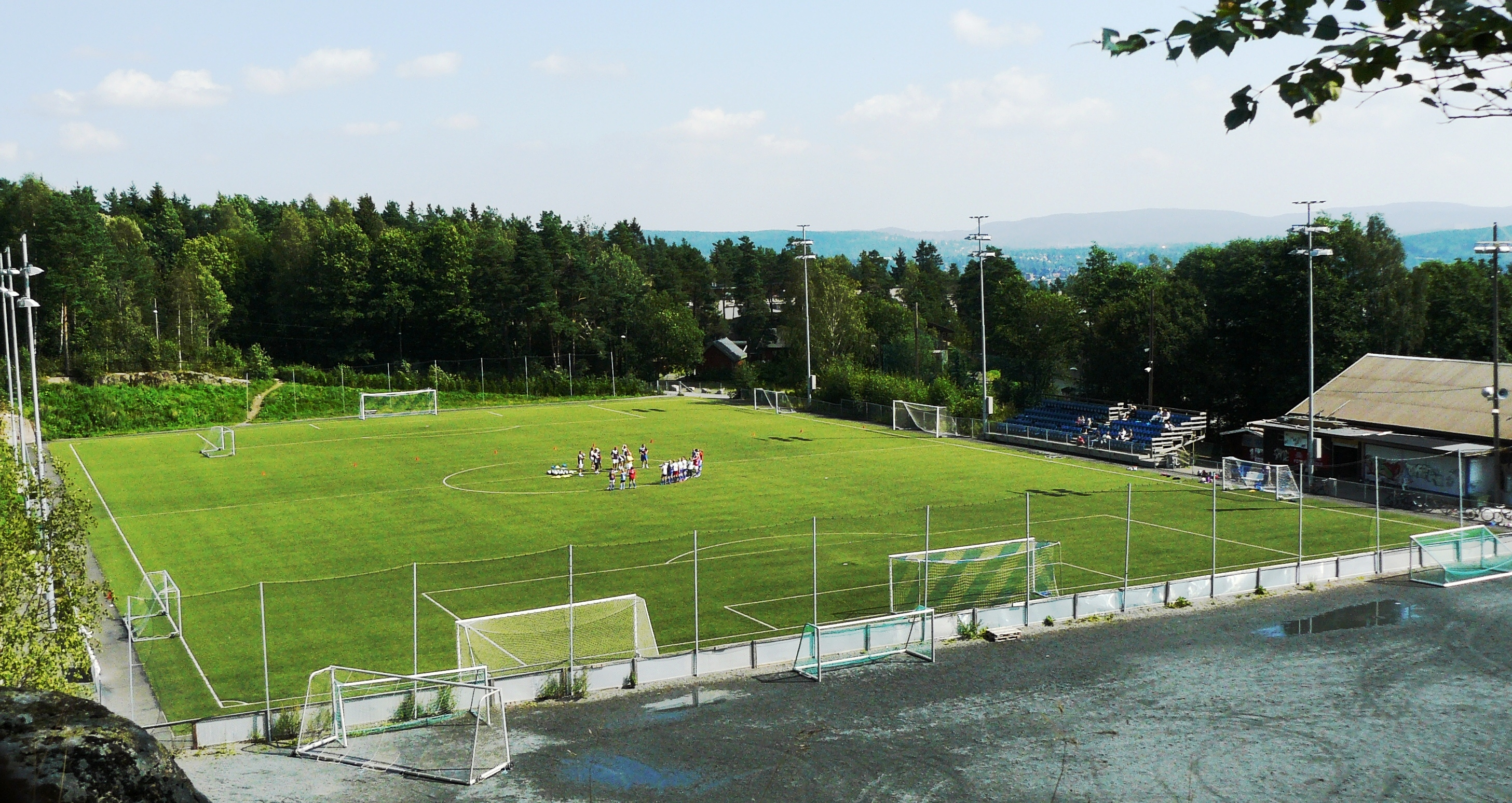
Greibanen

Groruddalen Ballklubb was a Norwegian association football club from Groruddalen, Oslo.

The club came into existence through the merger of a number of local clubs in 2002, but went defunct again in 2008, after some of those clubs withdrew their backing. The club's short existence was spent in the Norwegian third and second division, missing its aim, to earn promotion to the first division, narrowly in 2007.

== Founding ==
The valley of Groruddalen had a long history of competition between the many football teams. SF Grei was the best team for most of the 1990s, but there was little backing to be found from other clubs in the region. In late 1995 there were talks about a merger, this time between the football branches of Refstad-Veitvet IL, Linderud IL and possibly Årvoll IL and Hasle-Løren IL.

In 2002 the talks became more concrete. By that time Grei and Årvoll both had recently been relegated from the Second to the Third Division. These clubs first made plans together with Grorud IL, Vestli IL and Furuset IF. When the umbrella team Groruddalen BK was finally founded, Høybråten og Stovner IL had also joined. The foundation date was 22 September 2002. Rommen SK and Romsås IL later joined the cooperation.

== Sporting success ==
The club's goal was to be in the First Division within five years. In its first active season, 2003, Groruddalen BK won their Third Division group with flying colors. The team had a goal difference of 122–20, and won 20 of 22 matches. They however succumbed to Drøbak/Frogn IL in the promotion playoff. In 2004 they won the Third Division group again, but this time they beat Jevnaker IF in the promotion playoff.

In the 2005 Norwegian Second Division, Groruddalen ended in sixth place, one place behind Drøbak/Frogn. In the 2006 Norwegian Second Division they finished second, eight points behind Skeid. They scored 73 goals in 26 games, best in their group. In the 2007 Norwegian Second Division they finished third. Christian Torbjørnsen became joint top goalscorer in the entire Second Division (four groups) in 2007 with 26 goals, and in 2006 he became joint runner-up with 23 goals.

== Downfall ==
They then lost their coach Rolf Teigen and assistant coach Mathias Haugaasen to Bryne FK after the 2007 season, and nearly their entire roster. By November 2007, only two players from the 2007 season were left. They had a hopeless 2008 Norwegian Second Division season, and ended in last place with only eight points. After the 2008 season it was over. Groruddalen BK tried to incorporate the squad of the club Oslo City FC into theirs, but Oslo City rejected. Groruddalen had no grounds for existence as a Third Division club, both because of finances, and because the cooperating parts (Grei, Grorud, Vestli, Furuset, Høybråten og Stovner, Rommen and Romsås) were not backing the club enough. For instance, Grorud signalized that in a 2009 Third Division season, Groruddalen would be their direct competitor. Groruddalen eventually pulled their team, and ceased to exist.

== See also ==
- FK Oslo Øst
- Bjerkealliansen
- Linderud-Grei Toppfotball
