= Eidsvåg, Bergen =

Neighbourhood in Bergen, Vestland, Norway

Coordinates: 60.43671°N 5.316092°E

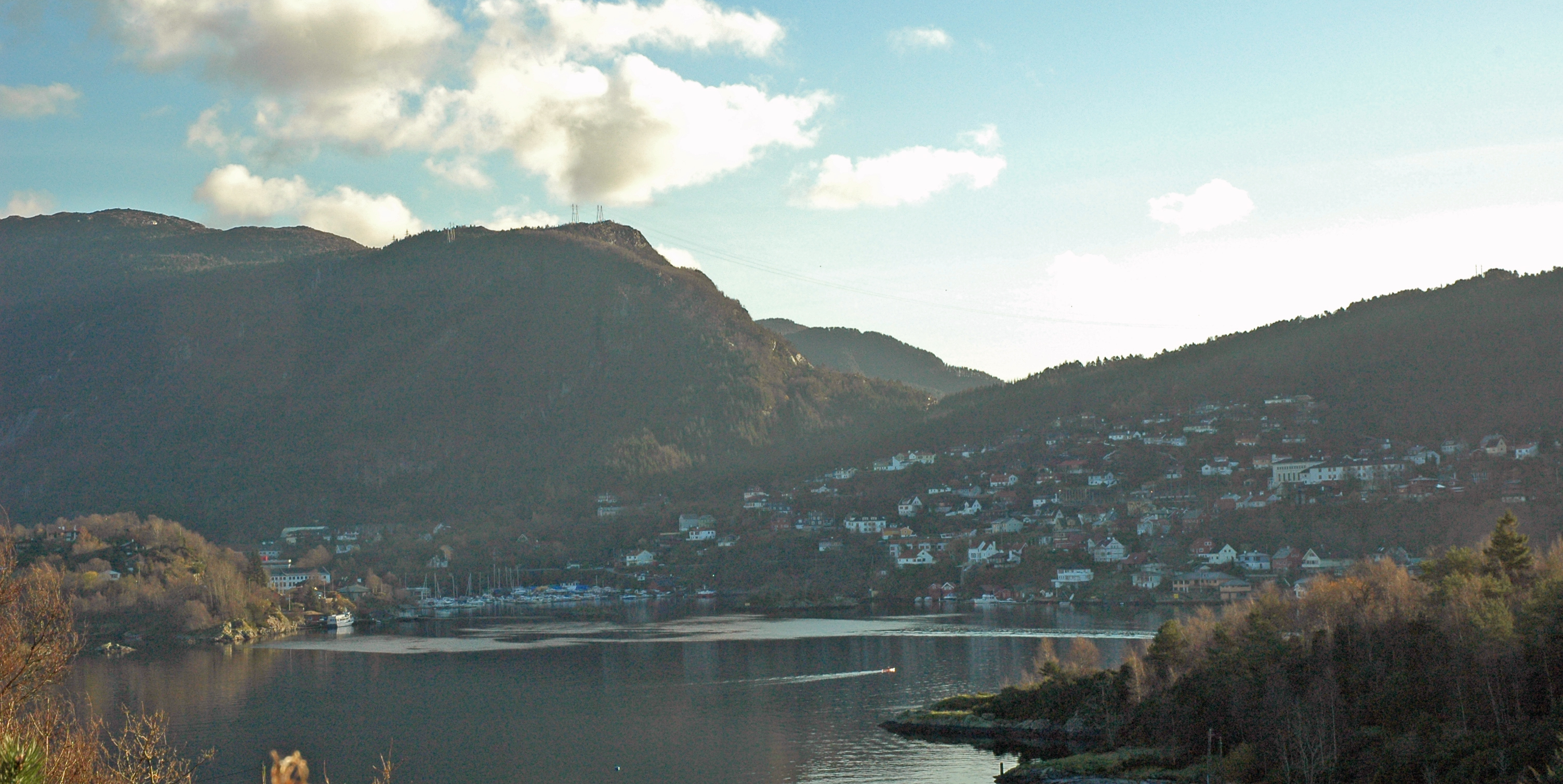
View of Eidsvåg Landscape

Eidsvåg is a neighborhood in the city of Bergen in Vestland county, Norway. The village area lies in the borough of Åsane in the northern part of the city. It is located north of Ytre Sandviken, northwest of Jordal, southwest of Ervik and south of Eidsvågen, an arm of Byfjorden. Eidsvåg was the administrative center of the old Åsane Municipality, until 1972 when Åsane was merged into the city of Bergen.

The area is mainly residential. It has Eidsvåg School, Eidsvåg Church, a slaughterhouse for Nortura, a marina, and the former Eidsvåg Fabrikker. In 2009, Eidsvåg had 2,965 residents and covered 2.24 square kilometres (0.86 sq mi).
