= Vestli IL =

Norwegian sports club

- Full name: Vestli Idrettslag
- Founded: 19 October 1972
- Dissolved: 2021
- Ground: Jesperud arena, Oslo
- League: 4. divisjon
- 2019: 11th
Home colours	Away colours

Vestli Idrettslag was a Norwegian sports club from Stovner borough, Oslo. It had sections for association football, team handball and tennis.

It was founded on 19 October 1972. The club colors were green and white.

The men's handball team formerly played in the highest Norwegian league. Players include Bjarte Myrhol and Kristian Kjelling.

The men's football team played in the 3. divisjon, the fourth tier of Norwegian football, for many years. It formerly cooperated to prop up an umbrella team called Groruddalen BK, but this team went defunct in 2008. Its last outing in the 3. divisjon came in 2012. The team last played in the 4. divisjon, ending 11th in their group in 2019. The 2020 season was cancelled due to the COVID-19 pandemic in Norway.

The men's futsal team last contested the 2019–20 1. divisjon, ending 9th out of 10.

In 2021 Vestli merged with Rommen SK to form the new club Stovner SK. The handball section was not a part of the merger.
