= Ørland BK =

Norwegian sports club

- Full name: Ørland Ballklubb
- Founded: 18 January 1994
- Ground: Gryta kunstgressbane, Brekstad
- League: 5. divisjon
Home colours

Ørland Ballklubb is a Norwegian sports club from Brekstad, Sør-Trøndelag. It has sections for association football and team handball.

The club was founded on 18 January 1994 as a cooperation team between Opphaug IL, Brekstad BK and IL Yrjar.

The men's football team currently plays in the Fifth Division, the sixth tier of Norwegian football. It had a stint in the 3. divisjon in the early 1990s, until 1994.

Players who started their career there include Jo Tessem, Kjell Rune Sellin and Sivert Solli.
