= Telavåg IL =

Norwegian sports club

- Full name: Telavåg Idrettslag
- Founded: 1968
- Ground: Telavåg stadion, Telavåg
- League: Fifth Division
Home colours

Telavåg Idrettslag is a Norwegian sports club from Telavåg in Øygarden Municipality. It has sections for football, track and field and badminton.

The club was founded in 1968. The men's football team currently resides in the Fifth Division (sixth tier). It last played in the Third Division in 1996, after a long stint.
