= Oslo City FC =

Norwegian sports club

Oslo City
- Full name: Oslo City FC
- Founded: 1987
- Ground: Stubberudmyra
- Chairman: Bente Skjellegård
- League: Fifth Division
- 2024: Fifth Division Oslo, Avdeling 1, 5th of 12
Home colours	Away colours

Oslo City FC is a sports club in Oslo, Norway, which was founded in 1987. The club has a football team who plays in the Fifth Division. The club has received some media attention because of its special style of play and his team have a great deal players with multi-cultural background.

== Recent history ==
Season		Pos.	Pl.	W	D	L	GS	GA	P	Cup	Notes
2008	3. divisjon	1	22	18	4	0	78	31	58	First qualifying round	Lost playoff for promotion
2009	3. divisjon	↑ 1	22	19	1	2	74	21	58		Promoted to the 2. divisjon
2010	2. divisjon	↓ 14	26	5	4	17	37	61	19	First round	Relegated to the 3. divisjon
2011	3. divisjon	2	24	16	3	5	54	32	51	First qualifying round	
2012	3. divisjon	8	26	11	1	14	48	54	34	First round	
2013	3. divisjon	3	26	17	4	5	82	34	55	First round	
