= Rommen SK =

Norwegian sports club

- Full name: Rommen Sportsklubb
- Founded: 20 August 1970
- Dissolved: 2021
- Ground: Rommensletta, Oslo
- League: 3. divisjon
- 2019: 9th, Group 1
Home colours

Rommen Sportsklubb was a Norwegian sports club from Stovner borough, Oslo. It had sections for association football and team handball.

== History ==
The club was founded on 24 November 1997 as a merger between Smedstua IL and Stovnerkameratene BK. It counted the founding date of Smedstua, 20 August 1970, as its founding date. The club colors were green and white.

The men's football team played in the Third Division, the fourth tier of Norwegian football. It formerly cooperated to prop up an umbrella team called Groruddalen BK, but this team went defunct in 2008. Its last stint in the Third Division came in 2019. The 2020 season was cancelled due to the COVID-19 pandemic in Norway, and Rommen SK was subsequently merged with Vestli IL in 2021 to form the new club Stovner SK.
