= Fjøra FK =

Norwegian football club

- Full name: Fjøra Fotballklubb
- Founded: January 1974
- Ground: Fosshaugane, Sogndalsfjøra
- League: Third Division
- 2024, 4.div.: 1st

Fjøra Fotballklubb is a Norwegian association football club from Sogndalsfjøra, Vestland.

Fjøra FK was founded in January 1974 as a local alternative for players who did not make the first team of Sogndal IL. Fjøra and played in green jerseys to emulate another local club, Kaupanger IL, whose name was also loaned by the new club. It was not until late 1979 that the name Fjøra was introduced, having won an internal vote where the closest contender was Fosshaugane.

The men's team plays in the Third Division, the fourth tier of Norwegian football. The men's team started out in the sixth tier, won promotion to the fifth tier in 1977 and the fourth tier in 1983. As the fourth tier was eventually named the Third Division from 1992, Fjøra enjoyed a two decade-long spell on that tier. Even reaching as high as the Second Division in 2000, Fjøra was relegated to the Third Division after one season, and further down to the Fourth Division in 2011. Fjøra then bounced between tiers, reaching the Third Division again in 2016–2017, 2019–2021 and 2024–present.

The team also reached the second round of the Norwegian Football Cup in 2007 and 2023. In the latter cup match, an attendance record of 1,294 was set.

As of 2024, Fjøra has no women's team and no children's teams.
