= IL Solid =

Norwegian sports club

- Full name: Idrettslaget Solid
- Founded: 1945
- Ground: Nysæter kunstgress
- League: Fourth Division
Home colours

Idrettslaget Solid is a Norwegian sports club from Sagvåg in Stord Municipality in Vestland county. It has sections for association football, team handball, gymnastics, swimming and orienteering.

The men's football team currently plays in the Fourth Division, the fifth tier of Norwegian football. It last played in the Third Division in 2006.

Its women's team had a solid run, winning its group in the 1998 First Division (second tier). It succumbed in a playoff to the 1998 Premier League. In 1999, Solid fielded a First Division team no more.
