= Årvoll IL =

Norwegian sports club

- Full name: Årvoll Idrettslag
- Founded: 16 October 1932
- Ground: Årvoll kunstgress, Oslo
- League: 3. divisjon avd. 1 (tier 4)
- 2018: 4. divisjon Oslo avd. 1 (tier 5), 1st
Home colours	Away colours

Årvoll Idrettslag is a Norwegian sports club from Årvoll, Bjerke, Oslo. It has sections for association football, team handball, volleyball, orienteering and Nordic skiing.

It was founded on 16 October 1932. The club colors are red and blue. Their home field is Årvoll kunstgress.

The men's football team currently plays in the Fourth Division, the fifth tier of Norwegian football, after being relegated from the Third Division in 2010. It last played in the Norwegian Second Division in 2000. Årvoll also have a women's team.

Årvoll has a history of cooperation with other clubs in football. In 2001 it formed (together with Linderud IL and Hasle-Løren IL) the umbrella team Bjerkealliansen, which operated on junior level (age 19 and below). Hasle-Løren backed out ahead of the 2009 season. Ahead of the 2003 season Årvoll's senior team gave up its spot in the league system (then Third Division) to cooperate on the umbrella team Groruddalen BK. Groruddalen BK became a success, was promoted to the Second Division and contended for the First Division, but after the 2008 season it was over. In the meantime, Årvoll, which had started anew, had climbed back up to the Third Division.

== Recent seasons ==
Season	Level	Division	Section	Position	Movements	Note/ source
1999	Tier 3	2. divisjon	Indre Østland avd. 2	6th/12		
2000	Tier 3	2. divisjon	Østfold avd. 2	10th/12	Relegated	
2001	Tier 4	3. divisjon	Østfold avd. 2	3rd/12		
2002	Tier 4	3. divisjon	Oslo avd. 1	3rd/12		
2003	Tier 5	4. divisjon	Oslo avd. 2	1st/12	Promoted	
2004	Tier 4	3. divisjon	Østfold avd. 2	2nd/12		
2005	Tier 4	3. divisjon	Østfold avd. 1	8th/12		
2006	Tier 4	3. divisjon	Østfold avd. 2	5th/12		
2007	Tier 4	3. divisjon	Oslo avd. 3	4th/12		
2008	Tier 4	3. divisjon	Oslo avd. 3	3rd/12		
2009	Tier 4	3. divisjon	Oslo avd. 4	7th/12		
2010	Tier 4	3. divisjon	Oslo avd. 5	9th/12	Relegated	
2011	Tier 5	4. divisjon	Oslo avd. 3	10th/12		
2012	Tier 5	4. divisjon	Oslo avd. 1	7th/12		
2013	Tier 5	4. divisjon	Oslo avd. 3	8th/12		
2014	Tier 5	4. divisjon	Oslo avd. 2	10th/12		
2015	Tier 5	4. divisjon	Oslo avd. 1	2nd/12		
2016	Tier 5	4. divisjon	Oslo avd. 3	1st/12		
2017	Tier 5	4. divisjon	Oslo avd. 2	5th/12		
2018	Tier 5	4. divisjon	Oslo avd. 1	1st/12	Promoted	
