= Gjelleråsen IF =

Norwegian sports club

- Full name: Gjelleråsen Idrettsforening
- Founded: 6 March 1935; 90 years ago
- League: 4. divisjon
- 2024: 3. divisjon group 5, 13th of 14 (relegated)
Home colours

Gjelleråsen Idrettsforening is a Norwegian sports club from Gjelleråsen in Nittedal, founded 6 March 1935. It has sections for association football, floorball, swimming, gymnastics and skiing. Their club colours are green and white.

The women's football team had a stint in the Toppserien in 1996, but was relegated that season. Its top goalscorer was Marianne Pettersen, who was awarded the league Player of the Year award and won an Olympic bronze medal in 1996, but left the team upon relegation.

The men's football team currently resides in the Norwegian Third Division. Former players include Kristian Flittie Onstad (on youth level) and Lasse Olsen.
