= NTNUI =

Norwegian sports club

NTNUI Fotball
Home colours

NTNUI logo

Norges Teknisk-naturvitenskapelige Universitets Idrettsforening, NTNUI, is the largest sports club in Norway with more than 10,000 members and a variety of participators on all levels of skills in more than 50 different sports. The athletic association is formally connected to the Norwegian University of Science and Technology located in Trondheim. The club has facilities at Dragvoll, Gløshaugen, Moholt and Solsiden.

The club was formed after the merge of several educational institutions in 1996, which resulted in the university NTNU. The largest of the merging sports clubs was NTHI.

NTNUI's cross-country skiing group is the sports club with the highest number of participants in the Norwegian ski marathon Birkebeinerrennet (170 participants in 2010).

== Sports sections affiliated ==
- Aikido
- American football
- Badminton
- Ball game and exercise
- Bandy
- Baseball
- Basketball
- Capoeira
- Climbing
- Cross-country skiing
- Cycling
- Dancing
- Diving
- Fencing
- Floorball (formerly separate teams for Dragvoll and Gløshaugen)
- Football
- Golf
- Gymnastics
- Handball Dragvoll
- Handball Gløshaugen
- Ice hockey
- Karate
- Lacrosse
- Orienteering
- Outdoor life
- Paddling
- Paintball
- Rowing
- Quidditch
- Rugby union
- Sailing – NTNUI Sailing
- Shooting
- Snowboard
- Softball/Baseball
- Squash
- Swimming
- Swing and folk dance
- Table tennis
- Taekwondo
- Tennis
- Tenshi Tsume
- Telemark and Alpine
- Track and field
- Triathlon
- Underwater rugby
- Volleyball Dragvoll
- Volleyball Gløshaugen
- Water polo
- Windsurfing
- Wing Chun
