= List of football clubs in Norway =

This is a list of football clubs in Norway, sorted for the 2023 season:

== Men ==
=== By league and division ===
National

- Eliteserien (Level 1)
- 1. divisjon (Level 2)
- 2. divisjon (Level 3)
  - Group 1–2
- 3. divisjon (Level 4)
  - Group 1–6

Regional

- 4. divisjon (Level 5)
  - Group 1–22 (Østfold, Akershus, Oslo 1, Oslo 2, Indre Østland, Buskerud, Vestfold, Telemark, Agder, Rogaland 1, Rogaland 2, Hordaland 1, Hordaland 2, Sogn og Fjordane, Sunnmøre, Nordmøre og Romsdal, Trøndelag 1, Trøndelag 2, Nordland, Hålogaland, Troms, Finnmark)
- 5. divisjon (Level 6)
  - Group 1–35 (Østfold, Akershus, Oslo 1, Oslo 2, Oslo 3, Indre Østland 1, Indre Østland 2, Buskerud, Vestfold, Telemark, Agder 1, Agder 2, Rogaland 1, Rogaland 2, Rogaland 3, Rogaland 4, Hordaland 1, Hordaland 2, Hordaland 3, Sogn og Fjordane, Sunnmøre, Nordmøre og Romsdal, Trøndelag 1, Trøndelag 2, Trøndelag 3, Trøndelag 4, Nordland, Hålogaland 1, Hålogaland 2, Hålogaland 3, Hålogaland 4, Troms, Finnmark 1, Finnmark 2, Finnmark 3)
- 6. divisjon (Level 7)
- 7. divisjon (Level 8)
- 8. divisjon (Level 9)
- 9. divisjon (Level 10)

=== Alphabetically ===
The divisions are correct for the 2020 season.

=== Key ===
Key to divisional change
New club
Club was promoted to a higher Level
Club resigned or was demoted to a lower Level
Club was relegated to a lower Level
Italics: Reserve teams playing in national divisions of the league system (level 1–4)

=== A ===
| Club | Division | Lvl | Change from 2019 |
|---|---|---|---|
| Aalesund | Eliteserien | 1 | Promoted from 1. divisjon |
| Aalesund 2 | 3. divisjon | 4 | |
| Åfjord | 4. divisjon | 5 | Promoted from 5. divisjon |
| Åga | 4. divisjon | 5 | |
| Åkra | 3. divisjon | 4 | Promoted from 4. divisjon |
| Ålgård | 4. divisjon | 5 | |
| Alta | 2. divisjon | 3 | |
| Åndalsnes | 4. divisjon | 5 | |
| Andenes | 4. divisjon | 5 | |
| Årdal | 3. divisjon | 4 | Promoted from 4. divisjon |
| Arendal | 2. divisjon | 3 | |
| Arna-Bjørnar | 4. divisjon | 5 | |
| Årvoll | 4. divisjon | 5 | Relegated from 3. divisjon |
| Ås | 4. divisjon | 5 | |
| Åsane | 1. divisjon | 2 | Promoted from 2. divisjon |
| Asker | 2. divisjon | 3 | |
| Åskollen | 4. divisjon | 5 | Promoted from 5. divisjon |
| Askøy | 4. divisjon | 5 | Promoted from 5. divisjon |
| Åssiden | 3. divisjon | 4 | Promoted from 4. divisjon |
| Aurskog-Høland | 4. divisjon | 5 | |
| Austevoll | 4. divisjon | 5 | Promoted from 5. divisjon |
| Austrått | 4. divisjon | 5 | |

=== B ===
| Club | Division | Lvl | Change from 2019 |
|---|---|---|---|
| Ballstad | 4. divisjon | 5 | |
| Bardufoss | 4. divisjon | 5 | |
| Bærum | 2. divisjon | 3 | |
| Bergen Nord | 4. divisjon | 5 | Relegated from 3. divisjon |
| Bergsøy | 4. divisjon | 5 | |
| Birkebeineren | 4. divisjon | 5 | |
| Bjarg | 3. divisjon | 4 | Promoted from 4. divisjon |
| Bjørnevatn | 4. divisjon | 5 | |
| Blaker | 4. divisjon | 5 | |
| Bodø/Glimt | Eliteserien | 1 | |
| Bodø/Glimt 2 | 3. divisjon | 4 | |
| Borgen | 4. divisjon | 5 | |
| Bossekop | 4. divisjon | 5 | |
| Brann | Eliteserien | 1 | |
| Brann 2 | 3. divisjon | 4 | |
| Brattvåg | 2. divisjon | 3 | |
| Bremanger | 4. divisjon | 5 | |
| Bremnes | 4. divisjon | 5 | |
| Brodd | 3. divisjon | 4 | |
| Brumunddal | 3. divisjon | 4 | |
| Bryne | 2. divisjon | 3 | |
| Buvik | 4. divisjon | 5 | Promoted from 5. divisjon |
| Byåsen | 3. divisjon | 4 | Relegated from 2. divisjon |

=== C ===
| Club | Division | Lvl | Change from 2019 |
|---|---|---|---|
| Charlottenlund | 4. divisjon | 5 | |

=== D ===
| Club | Division | Lvl | Change from 2019 |
|---|---|---|---|
| Dahle | 4. divisjon | 5 | |
| Dale | 4. divisjon | 5 | |
| Djerv | 4. divisjon | 5 | |
| Djerv 1919 | 3. divisjon | 4 | |
| Donn | 3. divisjon | 4 | |
| Drammens BK | 4. divisjon | 5 | |
| Drøbak/Frogn | 4. divisjon | 5 | Relegated from 3. divisjon |

=== E ===
| Club | Division | Lvl | Change from 2019 |
|---|---|---|---|
| Egersund | 2. divisjon | 3 | |
| Eid | 4. divisjon | 5 | |
| Eide og Omegn | 4. divisjon | 5 | |
| Eidsvold | 4. divisjon | 5 | |
| Eidsvold Turn | 2. divisjon | 3 | Promoted from 3. divisjon |
| Eiger | 4. divisjon | 5 | |
| Eik Tønsberg 871 | 3. divisjon | 3 | Promoted from 3. divisjon (Merged with FK Tønsberg) |
| Elverum | 3. divisjon | 4 | Relegated from 2. divisjon |
| Emblem | 4. divisjon | 5 | |
| Engerdal | 4. divisjon | 5 | |
| Express | 3. divisjon | 4 | Promoted from 2. divisjon |

=== F ===
| Club | Division | Lvl | Change from 2019 |
|---|---|---|---|
| Faaberg | 4. divisjon | 5 | |
| Fana | 3. divisjon | 4 | |
| Fauske/Sprint | 4. divisjon | 5 | |
| Finnsnes | 3. divisjon | 4 | |
| Fjellhamar | 4. divisjon | 5 | |
| Fjøra | 3. divisjon | 4 | |
| Flint | 3. divisjon | 4 | |
| Florø | 2. divisjon | 3 | |
| Fløy | 2. divisjon | 3 | Promoted from 3. divisjon |
| Fløya | 2. divisjon | 3 | Promoted from 3. divisjon |
| Follo | 3. divisjon | 4 | |
| Førde | 4. divisjon | 5 | |
| Fram | 4. divisjon | 5 | |
| Fram Larvik | 2. divisjon | 3 | |
| Fredrikstad | 2. divisjon | 3 | |
| Fredrikstad 2 | 3. divisjon | 4 | Promoted from 4. divisjon |
| Frigg | 3. divisjon | 4 | |
| Froland | 4. divisjon | 5 | Promoted from 5. divisjon |
| Frøya | 4. divisjon | 5 | |
| Frøyland | 4. divisjon | 5 | |
| Fu/Vo | 3. divisjon | 4 | Promoted from 4. divisjon |
| Furnes | 4. divisjon | 5 | |
| Fyllingsdalen | 3. divisjon | 4 | |

=== G ===
| Club | Division | Lvl | Change from 2019 |
|---|---|---|---|
| Gamle Oslo | 4. divisjon | 5 | Promoted from 5. divisjon |
| Giv Akt | 4. divisjon | 5 | Promoted from 5. divisjon |
| Gjelleråsen | 3. divisjon | 4 | |
| Gjerdrum | 4. divisjon | 5 | Promoted from 5. divisjon |
| Gjøvik-Lyn | 3. divisjon | 4 | |
| Gneist | 4. divisjon | 5 | |
| Gran | 4. divisjon | 5 | |
| Grand Bodø | 4. divisjon | 5 | |
| Grei | 4. divisjon | 5 | Relegated from 3. divisjon |
| Grorud | 1. divisjon | 2 | Promoted from 2. divisjon |
| Grorud 2 | 3. divisjon | 4 | Promoted from 4. divisjon |
| Grovfjord | 4. divisjon | 5 | |
| Gulset | 4. divisjon | 5 | Promoted from 5. divisjon |

=== H ===
| Club | Division | Lvl | Change from 2019 |
|---|---|---|---|
| Hallingdal | 4. divisjon | 5 | |
| Halsen | 3. divisjon | 4 | |
| HamKam | 1. divisjon | 2 | |
| Hana | 4. divisjon | 5 | |
| Hardhaus | 4. divisjon | 5 | Promoted from 5. divisjon |
| Hareid | 4. divisjon | 5 | |
| Harstad | 4. divisjon | 5 | Relegated from 3. divisjon |
| Haugesund | Eliteserien | 1 | |
| Havdur | 4. divisjon | 5 | |
| Heggedal | 4. divisjon | 5 | |
| Hei | 4. divisjon | 5 | |
| Heimdal | 4. divisjon | 5 | |
| Herd | 4. divisjon | 5 | Relegated from 3. divisjon |
| HIF/Stein | 4. divisjon | 5 | |
| Hinna | 3. divisjon | 4 | Promoted from 4. divisjon |
| Hisøy | 4. divisjon | 5 | |
| Hitra | 4. divisjon | 5 | |
| Hødd | 2. divisjon | 3 | |
| Holmen | 4. divisjon | 5 | |
| Holmlia | 4. divisjon | 5 | |
| Hønefoss | 3. divisjon | 4 | |
| Honningsvåg | 4. divisjon | 5 | |
| Hovdebygda | 4. divisjon | 5 | Promoted from 5. divisjon |
| Høyang | 4. divisjon | 5 | |
| Hundvåg | 4. divisjon | 5 | |
| Huringen | 4. divisjon | 5 | |

=== I ===
| Club | Division | Lvl | Change from 2019 |
|---|---|---|---|
| Indrefjord | 4. divisjon | 5 | |
| Innstranden | 4. divisjon | 5 | |

=== J ===
| Club | Division | Lvl | Change from 2019 |
|---|---|---|---|
| Jerv | 1. divisjon | 2 | |
| Jevnaker | 4. divisjon | 5 | |
| Junkeren | 3. divisjon | 4 | |

=== K ===
| Club | Division | Lvl | Change from 2019 |
|---|---|---|---|
| Kabelvåg (as Kabelvåg/Lofoten 2) | 4. divisjon | 5 | Promoted from 5. divisjon |
| Kaupanger | 4. divisjon | 5 | |
| KFUM Oslo | 1. divisjon | 2 | |
| KIL/Hemne | 4. divisjon | 5 | |
| Kirkenes | 4. divisjon | 5 | |
| Kjelsås | 2. divisjon | 3 | |
| Kløfta | 4. divisjon | 5 | |
| Kolbotn | 4. divisjon | 5 | |
| Kolbu/KK | 4. divisjon | 5 | |
| Kolstad | 3. divisjon | 4 | |
| Kongsberg | 4. divisjon | 5 | |
| Kongsvinger | 1. divisjon | 2 | |
| Kongsvinger 2 | 3. divisjon | 4 | |
| Konnerud | 4. divisjon | 5 | |
| Kopervik | 4. divisjon | 5 | |
| Kråkerøy | 3. divisjon | 4 | |
| Kristiansund BK | Eliteserien | 1 | |
| Kristiansund FK | 4. divisjon | 5 | |
| Krokelvdalen | 4. divisjon | 5 | |
| Kvaløya | 4. divisjon | 5 | Promoted from 5. divisjon |
| Kvik | 4. divisjon | 5 | |
| Kvik Halden | 2. divisjon | 3 | |
| Kvinesdal | 4. divisjon | 5 | |

=== L ===
| Club | Division | Lvl | Change from 2019 |
|---|---|---|---|
| Landsås | 4. divisjon | 5 | |
| Langesund | 4. divisjon | 5 | |
| Langevåg | 4. divisjon | 5 | Promoted from 5. divisjon |
| Larsnes/Gursken | 4. divisjon | 5 | |
| Larvik Turn | 4. divisjon | 5 | |
| Leknes | 4. divisjon | 5 | Relegated from 3. divisjon |
| Levanger | 2. divisjon | 3 | |
| Lillehammer | 4. divisjon | 5 | |
| Lillestrøm | 1. divisjon | 2 | Relegated from Eliteserien |
| Lillestrøm 2 | 3. divisjon | 4 | |
| Lisleby | 4. divisjon | 5 | Promoted from 5. divisjon |
| Loddefjord | 4. divisjon | 5 | |
| Lofoten | 4. divisjon | 5 | |
| Lokomotiv Oslo | 3. divisjon | 4 | |
| Lommedalen | 4. divisjon | 5 | |
| Lørenskog | 3. divisjon | 4 | |
| Løten | 4. divisjon | 5 | |
| Luna | 4. divisjon | 5 | Promoted from 5. divisjon |
| Lura | 4. divisjon | 5 | |
| Lyn | 3. divisjon | 4 | |
| Lyngbø | 4. divisjon | 5 | |
| Lyngdal | 4. divisjon | 5 | |
| Lyngen/Karnes | 4. divisjon | 5 | |
| Lysekloster | 3. divisjon | 4 | |

=== M ===
| Club | Division | Lvl | Change from 2019 |
|---|---|---|---|
| Madla | 3. divisjon | 4 | |
| Majorstuen | 4. divisjon | 5 | |
| Malmefjorden | 4. divisjon | 5 | |
| Mandalskameratene | 3. divisjon | 4 | |
| Manglerud Star | 4. divisjon | 5 | |
| Mathopen | 4. divisjon | 5 | Promoted from 5. divisjon |
| Melbo | 3. divisjon | 4 | |
| Melhus | 3. divisjon | 4 | |
| Midsund | 4. divisjon | 5 | |
| Mjølner | 3. divisjon | 4 | Relegated from 2. divisjon |
| Mjøndalen | Eliteserien | 1 | |
| Mjøndalen 2 | 3. divisjon | 4 | |
| Modum | 4. divisjon | 5 | |
| Molde | Eliteserien | 1 | |
| Molde 2 | 3. divisjon | 4 | |
| Morild | 4. divisjon | 5 | |
| Mosjøen | 4. divisjon | 5 | |
| Moss | 2. divisjon | 3 | |

=== N ===
| Club | Division | Lvl | Change from 2019 |
|---|---|---|---|
| Namsos | 4. divisjon | 5 | |
| Nærbø | 4. divisjon | 5 | |
| Nardo | 2. divisjon | 3 | |
| Nesodden | 4. divisjon | 5 | |
| NHHI | 4. divisjon | 5 | |
| Norborg (as Norborg/Brattvåg 2) | 4. divisjon | 5 | |
| Nordkjosbotn | 4. divisjon | 5 | |
| Nordlys | 4. divisjon | 5 | |
| Nordre Fjell | 4. divisjon | 5 | Promoted from 5. divisjon |
| Nordstrand | 3. divisjon | 4 | |
| Norild | 4. divisjon | 5 | Relegated from 3. divisjon |
| Notodden | 2. divisjon | 3 | Relegated from 1. divisjon |
| NTNUI | 3. divisjon | 4 | Promoted from 4. divisjon |
| Nybergsund | 3. divisjon | 4 | |

=== O ===
| Club | Division | Lvl | Change from 2019 |
|---|---|---|---|
| Odd | Eliteserien | 1 | |
| Olderskog | 4. divisjon | 5 | Promoted from 5. divisjon |
| Oppsal | 3. divisjon | 4 | Relegated from 2. divisjon |
| Orkla | 3. divisjon | 4 | |
| Ørn Horten | 3. divisjon | 4 | |
| Os | 3. divisjon | 4 | |
| Oslojuvelene | 4. divisjon | 5 | |
| Osterøy | 4. divisjon | 5 | |
| Østsiden | 4. divisjon | 5 | |
| Ottestad | 4. divisjon | 5 | |
| Øygarden | 1. divisjon | 2 | New club (license taken from Nest-Sotra) |

=== P ===
| Club | Division | Lvl | Change from 2019 |
|---|---|---|---|
| Porsanger | 4. divisjon | 5 | |
| Pors Grenland | 3. divisjon | 4 | |

=== R ===
| Club | Division | Lvl | Change from 2019 |
|---|---|---|---|
| Råde | 4. divisjon | 5 | |
| Rakkestad | 4. divisjon | 5 | |
| Rana | 3. divisjon | 4 | Promoted from 4. divisjon |
| Randaberg | 4. divisjon | 5 | |
| Randesund | 4. divisjon | 5 | |
| Ranheim | 1. divisjon | 2 | Relegated from Eliteserien |
| Ranheim 2 | 3. divisjon | 4 | |
| Raufoss | 1. divisjon | 2 | |
| Raufoss 2 | 3. divisjon | 4 | |
| Raumens & Årnes | 4. divisjon | 5 | |
| Re | 4. divisjon | 5 | |
| Ready | 3. divisjon | 4 | |
| Reinsvoll | 4. divisjon | 5 | |
| Rennebu | 4. divisjon | 5 | |
| Riska | 4. divisjon | 5 | |
| Rollon | 4. divisjon | 5 | |
| Rommen | 3. divisjon | 4 | |
| Rørvik | 4. divisjon | 5 | |
| Rosenborg | Eliteserien | 1 | |
| Rosenborg 2 | 2. divisjon | 3 | Promoted from 3. divisjon |
| Rosseland | 4. divisjon | 5 | Promoted from 5. divisjon |
| Røst | 4. divisjon | 5 | Promoted from 5. divisjon |
| Runar | 4. divisjon | 5 | |

=== S ===
| Club | Division | Lvl | Change from 2019 |
|---|---|---|---|
| Sagene | 4. divisjon | 5 | |
| Salangen | 4. divisjon | 5 | |
| Sandefjord | Eliteserien | 1 | Promoted from 1. divisjon |
| Sande (as Sande/Nordre Sande) | 4. divisjon | 5 | Promoted from 5. divisjon |
| Sandefjord BK | 4. divisjon | 5 | |
| Sander | 4. divisjon | 5 | |
| Sandnessjøen | 4. divisjon | 5 | |
| Sandnes Ulf | 1. divisjon | 2 | |
| Sandviken | 3. divisjon | 4 | |
| Sarpsborg 08 | Eliteserien | 1 | |
| Sarpsborg 08 2 | 3. divisjon | 4 | |
| Sarpsborg FK | 4. divisjon | 5 | |
| Selbak | 4. divisjon | 5 | |
| Senja | 2. divisjon | 3 | |
| SIF/Hessa | 4. divisjon | 5 | |
| Skade (As Ulefoss/Skade) | 4. divisjon | 5 | |
| Skånland | 3. divisjon | 4 | Promoted from 4. divisjon |
| Skarp | 4. divisjon | 5 | |
| Skarphedin | 4. divisjon | 5 | |
| Skavøypoll | 4. divisjon | 5 | Promoted from 5. divisjon |
| Skedsmo | 4. divisjon | 5 | |
| Skeid | 2. divisjon | 3 | Relegated from 1. divisjon |
| Skeid 2 | 3. divisjon | 4 | Promoted from 4. divisjon |
| Skjervøy | 3. divisjon | 4 | |
| Skjetten | 4. divisjon | 5 | Relegated from 3. divisjon |
| Skjold | 4. divisjon | 5 | |
| Smøla | 4. divisjon | 5 | Promoted from 5. divisjon |
| Smørås | 4. divisjon | 5 | |
| Snøgg | 4. divisjon | 5 | Promoted from 5. divisjon |
| Sogndal | 1. divisjon | 2 | |
| Sogndal 2 | 3. divisjon | 4 | |
| Søgne | 4. divisjon | 5 | |
| Sokndal | 4. divisjon | 5 | Promoted from 5. divisjon |
| Sola | 3. divisjon | 4 | Relegated from 2. divisjon |
| Solberg | 4. divisjon | 5 | |
| Sørøy Glimt | 4. divisjon | 5 | |
| Sortland | 4. divisjon | 5 | |
| Sørumsand | 4. divisjon | 5 | |
| Sotra | 2. divisjon | 3 | |
| Spjelkavik | 3. divisjon | 4 | |
| Sprint-Jeløy | 4. divisjon | 5 | |
| Staal Jørpeland | 3. divisjon | 4 | |
| Stabæk | Eliteserien | 1 | |
| Stabæk 2 | 3. divisjon | 4 | |
| Stag | 4. divisjon | 5 | Promoted from 5. divisjon |
| Stakkevollan | 4. divisjon | 5 | |
| Start | Eliteserien | 1 | Promoted from 1. divisjon |
| Start 2 | 3. divisjon | 4 | |
| Stathelle | 4. divisjon | 5 | |
| Stavanger | 4. divisjon | 5 | Promoted from 5. divisjon |
| Steinkjer | 4. divisjon | 5 | Relegated from 3. divisjon |
| Stjørdals-Blink | 1. divisjon | 2 | Promoted from 2. divisjon |
| Stokke | 4. divisjon | 5 | |
| Stoppen | 4. divisjon | 5 | |
| Stord | 3. divisjon | 4 | |
| Storelva | 4. divisjon | 5 | |
| Storm | 4. divisjon | 5 | Relegated from 3. divisjon |
| Strindheim | 3. divisjon | 4 | |
| Strømmen | 1. divisjon | 2 | |
| Strømsgodset | Eliteserien | 1 | |
| Strømsgodset 2 | 3. divisjon | 4 | |
| Stryn | 4. divisjon | 5 | |
| Studentspretten | 4. divisjon | 5 | |
| Sund | 4. divisjon | 5 | |
| Sunde | 4. divisjon | 5 | |
| Sunndal | 4. divisjon | 5 | Relegated from 3. divisjon |
| Surnadal | 4. divisjon | 5 | |
| Svelvik | 4. divisjon | 5 | |
| Sverresborg | 4. divisjon | 5 | |
| Svolvær | 4. divisjon | 5 | |
| Svorkmo/NOI | 4. divisjon | 5 | |
| Syril | 4. divisjon | 5 | |

=== T ===
| Club | Division | Lvl | Change from 2019 |
|---|---|---|---|
| Tana | 4. divisjon | 5 | |
| Teie | 4. divisjon | 5 | |
| Tertnes | 4. divisjon | 5 | |
| Tiller | 3. divisjon | 4 | |
| Tistedalen | 4. divisjon | 5 | Promoted from 5. divisjon |
| Tomrefjord | 4. divisjon | 5 | |
| Tornado Måløy | 4. divisjon | 5 | |
| Toten | 3. divisjon | 4 | Promoted from 4. divisjon |
| Træff | 3. divisjon | 4 | |
| Trauma | 4. divisjon | 5 | Promoted from 5. divisjon |
| Tromsdalen | 2. divisjon | 3 | Relegated from 1. divisjon |
| Tromsø | 1. divisjon | 2 | Relegated from Eliteserien |
| Tromsø 2 | 3. divisjon | 4 | |
| Trott | 4. divisjon | 5 | |
| Trygg/Lade | 4. divisjon | 5 | |
| Trysil | 4. divisjon | 5 | |
| Tverrelvdalen | 4. divisjon | 5 | |
| Tynset | 3. divisjon | 4 | Promoted from 4. divisjon |

=== U ===
| Club | Division | Lvl | Change from 2019 |
|---|---|---|---|
| Ulefoss (As Ulefoss/Skade) | 4. divisjon | 5 | |
| Ull/Kisa | 1. divisjon | 2 | |
| Ull/Kisa 2 | 3. divisjon | 4 | |
| Ullern | 3. divisjon | 4 | |
| Urædd | 4. divisjon | 5 | |

=== V ===
| Club | Division | Lvl | Change from 2019 |
|---|---|---|---|
| Våg | 4. divisjon | 5 | |
| Valder | 4. divisjon | 5 | |
| Valdres | 4. divisjon | 5 | Relegated from 3. divisjon |
| Vålerenga | Eliteserien | 1 | |
| Vålerenga 2 | 2. divisjon | 3 | Promoted from 3. divisjon |
| Valhall | 4. divisjon | 5 | Promoted from 5. divisjon |
| Vardeneset | 4. divisjon | 5 | Relegated from 3. divisjon |
| Vard Haugesund | 2. divisjon | 3 | Promoted from 3. divisjon |
| Varegg | 4. divisjon | 5 | |
| Varhaug | 4. divisjon | 5 | |
| Vaulen | 4. divisjon | 5 | |
| Verdal | 4. divisjon | 5 | Relegated from 3. divisjon |
| Vestfossen | 4. divisjon | 5 | Relegated from 3. divisjon |
| Vestnes Varfjell | 4. divisjon | 5 | |
| Vidar | 3. divisjon | 4 | Relegated from 2. divisjon |
| Vigør | 4. divisjon | 5 | |
| Vik | 4. divisjon | 5 | Promoted from 5. divisjon |
| Viking | Eliteserien | 1 | |
| Viking 2 | 3. divisjon | 4 | |
| Vindbjart | 3. divisjon | 4 | |
| Volda | 3. divisjon | 4 | Promoted from 4. divisjon |
| Vollen | 4. divisjon | 5 | |
| Vuku | 4. divisjon | 5 | |

== Women ==
=== Toppserien (1st level) ===
- Arna-Bjørnar
- Avaldsnes
- Klepp
- Kolbotn
- LSK Kvinner
- Lyn
- Røa
- Sandviken
- Trondheims-Ørn
- Vålerenga

=== 1. divisjon (2nd level) ===
- Amazon Grimstad
- Åsane
- Fløya
- Grei
- Hønefoss
- KIL/Hemne
- Medkila
- Øvrevoll Hosle
