= 2021 Norwegian Football Cup =

Tournament details
- Country: Norway
- Teams: 128 (competition proper)

Final positions
- Champions: Molde (5th title)
- Runners-up: Bodø/Glimt

Tournament statistics
- Matches played: 127
- Goals scored: 471 (3.71 per match)
- Top goal scorer(s): Markus Eiane (6 goals)

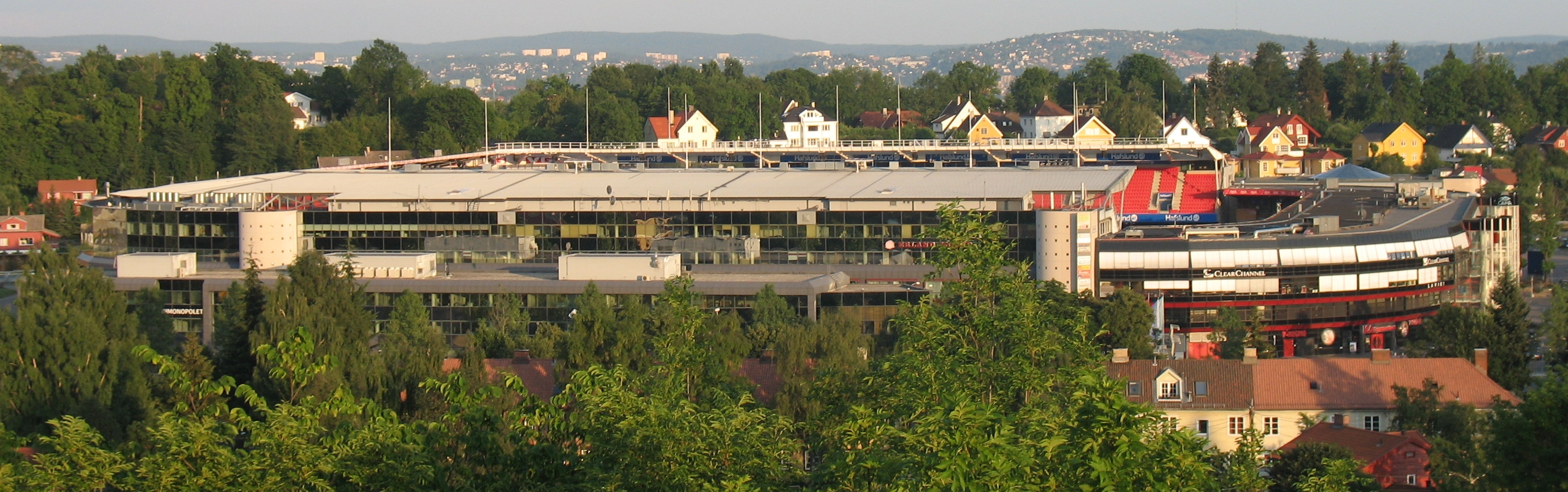
Ullevaal Stadion, Oslo - venue for the Norwegian Cup final

The 2021 Norwegian Football Cup was the 115th season of the Norwegian annual knock-out football tournament. The first round was played on 24 and 25 July 2021 and the tournament ended with the final being held on 1 May 2022. Due to delays at the beginning of the season the first round was moved from April to July, resulting in not being able to finish the tournament in 2021. Three rounds were played in 2021, while the remaining four rounds were played at the beginning of the 2022 season.

== Calendar ==
Below are the dates for each round as given by the official schedule:

Round	Main date	Number of fixtures	Clubs
First round	24–25 July 2021	64	128 → 64
Second round	31 July – 1 August 2021	32	64 → 32
Third round	22 September 2021	16	32 → 16
Fourth round	12–13 March 2022	8	16 → 8
Quarter-finals	19–20 March 2022	4	8 → 4
Semi-finals	6 April 2022	2	4 → 2
Final	1 May 2022	1	2 → 1

== First round ==
The draw for the first round was made on 25 June 2021.

Number of teams per tier entering this round
Eliteserien (1)	1. divisjon (2)	2. divisjon (3)	3. divisjon (4)	4. divisjon (5)	Total
16 / 16	16 / 16	25 / 28	64 / 84	7 / 272	128 / 416

24 July 2021	Frigg (4)	2–4	(2) KFUM Oslo	Oslo
13:00 CEST (UTC+2)	U. Ferrer 57' (pen.); V. Kaba 59'	Report	A. Sanyang 5'; H. Hoseth 53'; M. Mahnin 61'; Sortevik 84'	Stadium: Tørteberg Kunstgress 2 Attendance: 0 Referee: Marius Bye

24 July 2021	Junkeren (4)	2–0	(4) Mjølner	Bodø
13:00 CEST (UTC+2)	A. Skindlo 88'; V. Brendlien 90'	Report		Stadium: Stordalen Kunstgress; Attendance: 56; Referee: Michael W. Pedersen

24 July 2021	Kolstad (4)	0–5	(3) Levanger	Trondheim
13:00 CEST (UTC+2)		Report	A. Gunnes 55'; A. Rogulj 57', 60', 82'; Aas 85'	Stadium: Kolstad Idrettspark; Attendance: 172; Referee: Markus Lille

24 July 2021	Finnsnes (4)	0–3	(3) Senja	Finnsnes
14:00 CEST (UTC+2)		Report	G. Severinsen 67'; T. Whalen 75'; A. Mikkelsen 86'	Stadium: Finnsnes Kunstgress; Attendance: 300; Referee: Sander T. Badar

24 July 2021	Fløya (3)	3–3 (a.e.t.) (6–5 p)	(3) Tromsdalen	Tromsø
14:00 CEST (UTC+2)	Y. Johansen 25'; B. Berg-Johansen 90'; S. Fitzgerald 95'	Report	Grønli 26'; A. Løvland 77'; Unknown ?'	Stadium: Fløya Arena; Attendance: 150; Referee: André Resvoll

24 July 2021	Herd (5)	0–3	(3) Hødd	Ålesund
14:00 CEST (UTC+2)		Report	M. Bruun-Hanssen 39'; O. Løken 68', 90+3'	Stadium: Amfi Moa Stadion; Attendance: 200; Referee: Martin Sørensen Kristiansen

24 July 2021	Nordstrand (4)	2–2 (a.e.t.) (2–1 p)	(3) Bærum	Oslo
14:00 CEST (UTC+2)	L. Thelle 45', 49'	Report	L. Slemdal 85'; J. Kvernstuen 90' (pen.)	Stadium: Nordstrand Kunstgress; Referee: Simen Kristiansen

24 July 2021	Tynset (4)	1–4	(4) Tiller	Tynset
14:00 CEST (UTC+2)	S. Aasen 75'	Report	R. Hermanstad 14'; J. Frønes 42', 71'; F. Myrvold 56'	Stadium: Nytrømoen Gras; Attendance: 320; Referee: Even Myrheim

24 July 2021	Vidar (4)	2–1	(3) Egersund	Stavanger
14:00 CEST (UTC+2)	L. Emanuelsen 30'; V. Fajfric 90'	Report	Johannesen 90'	Stadium: Lassa Idrettspark; Referee: Amir Ajjour

24 July 2021	Bjarg (4)	0–5	(1) Brann	Bergen
15:00 CEST (UTC+2)		Report	Pedersen 10'; Bamba 21'; Delaveris 44'; Taylor 50'; Sané 66'	Stadium: Stavollen Idrettspark; Attendance: 700; Referee: Sondre Brudvik

24 July 2021	Elverum (4)	1–3	(3) Kongsvinger	Elverum
15:00 CEST (UTC+2)	E. Bellhcen 45'	Report	Grodås 3'; J. Grundt 35'; H. Holter 65'	Stadium: Elverum Stadion; Attendance: 304; Referee: Bjørn A. J. Laugerud

24 July 2021	Express (4)	0–8	(2) Start	Grimstad
15:00 CEST (UTC+2)		Report	Akinyemi 25', 45', 90'; Markovic 31', 59'; Tønnessen 37'; Schulze 58'; Sjøkvist 87'	Stadium: Fevik Stadion; Attendance: 585; Referee: Jørgen Haugen

24 July 2021	Fana (4)	2–1	(3) Sotra	Bergen
15:00 CEST (UTC+2)	M. Ingebrigtsen 27'; A. Lund 57'	Report	P. Johansen 36'	Stadium: Varden Amfi; Attendance: 100; Referee: Martin N. Mjøs

24 July 2021	Follo (4)	0–1	(1) Stabæk	Ski
15:00 CEST (UTC+2)		Report	Hansen 90+5'	Stadium: Ski Stadion; Attendance: 437; Referee: Johan W. Grundt

24 July 2021	Fu/Vo (4)	0–4	(1) Lillestrøm	Oppåkermoen
15:00 CEST (UTC+2)		Report	Brunes 31', 57'; Garnås 51'; M. Rosenkilde 79' (o.g.)	Stadium: Funnefoss Stadion; Referee: Ali al Hatam

24 July 2021	Hinna (4)	0–4	(2) Bryne	Stavanger
15:00 CEST (UTC+2)		Report	R. Undheim 31'; Holtan 34', 87'; S. Jensen 59'	Stadium: Wintershall Dea-banen; Attendance: 242; Referee: André B. Birkeland

24 July 2021	Mandalskameratene (4)	1–2 (a.e.t.)	(3) Arendal	Mandal
15:00 CEST (UTC+2)	A. Kvinen 51'	Report	K. Eriksen 80'; Kiilerich 105' (pen.)	Stadium: Idrettsparken Stadion; Attendance: 512; Referee: Javi Jean-Marc Conny Mertens

24 July 2021	NTNUI (4)	0–6	(2) Stjørdals-Blink	Trondheim
15:00 CEST (UTC+2)		Report	O. Rødahl 8', 61'; L. Bransdal 39', 89'; M. Augdal 45+2', 71'	Stadium: Koteng Arena; Referee: Bendik Haarberg

24 July 2021	Skånland (4)	0–11	(1) Tromsø	Evenskjer
15:00 CEST (UTC+2)		Report	Ebiye 20'; Antonsen 25'; Mikkelsen 27', 47'; Vesterlund 41'; A. Jenssen 59'; Gundersen 64'; Rothmann 66', 81'; Ingebrigtsen 78', 83'	Stadium: Skånland Kunstgress; Attendance: 400; Referee: Kristian Kristiansen

24 July 2021	Sunndal (5)	0–4	(3) Brattvåg	Sunndalsøra
15:00 CEST (UTC+2)		Report	J. Mogensen 2'; S. Lille-Løvø 22'; L. Petersen 39'; P. Hildre 86'	Stadium: Sunndal Kunstgress; Attendance: 300; Referee: Rikhard H. Lyng

24 July 2021	Vardeneset (5)	0–3	(4) Djerv 1919	Stavanger
15:00 CEST (UTC+2)		Report	S. Haaland 70', 72'; H. Karlsen 85'	Stadium: Modenabanen; Referee: Are G. Høyland

24 July 2021	Skjervøy (4)	0–1	(3) Alta	Skjervøy
15:30 CEST (UTC+2)		Report	C. Reginiussen 90'	Stadium: Lerøy Stadion; Attendance: 150; Referee: Magnus H. Tjelle

24 July 2021	Brodd (4)	0–3	(2) Sandnes Ulf	Stavanger
16:00 CEST (UTC+2)		Report	Jónsson 33'; Bringaker 71'; M. Effiom 81'	Stadium: Midjord Idrettspark; Attendance: 450; Referee: Aleksander S. Vermundsen

24 July 2021	Fjøra (4)	0–3	(2) Sogndal	Sogndalsfjøra
16:00 CEST (UTC+2)		Report	M. Flo 9' (o.g.); I. Skorve 28'; K. Hoven 30'	Stadium: Fosshaugane Campus; Attendance: 300; Referee: Jakob Søgnen

24 July 2021	Eik Tønsberg (4)	0–1	(1) Odd	Tønsberg
16:00 CEST (UTC+2)		Report	Lauritsen 89' (pen.)	Stadium: Tønsberg Gressbane; Attendance: 1,347; Referee: Sander Johannessen

24 July 2021	Gjelleråsen (4)	1–4	(3) Eidsvold Turn	Gjelleråsen
16:00 CEST (UTC+2)	S. Bakken 6'	Report	H. Henriksen 30', 56'; J. Kolbjørnsrud 40'; B. Notoane 49'	Stadium: Li Kunstgress; Attendance: 120; Referee: Arion Shaqiri

24 July 2021	Gjøvik-Lyn (4)	2–0	(4) Toten	Gjøvik
16:00 CEST (UTC+2)	J. Karlsson 9'; J. Sandberg 56'	Report		Stadium: Gjøvik Stadion; Attendance: 400; Referee: Christoffer D. Bergstuen

24 July 2021	Stord (4)	2–2 (a.e.t.) (7–6 p)	(1) Haugesund	Stord
16:00 CEST (UTC+2)	E. Grov 66'; M. Pedersen 90+4'	Report	Fredriksen 23'; Sande 51'	Stadium: Stord Stadion; Attendance: 790; Referee: Jan Morten Tennøy
	Penalties
	M. Pedersen (penalty missed); S. Grov (penalty scored); A. Eide (penalty scored); J. Jensen (penalty scored); J. Stoknes (penalty missed); E. Johnsen (penalty scored); E. Grov (penalty scored); M. Rinne (penalty scored); J. Gjerde (penalty scored)		(penalty scored) Liseth; (penalty missed) Stølås; (penalty scored) Therkildsen; (penalty missed) Ndour; (penalty scored) Hansen; (penalty scored) T. Pedersen; (penalty scored) M. Tjoland; (penalty scored) Gunnarshaug; (penalty missed) M. Johannesen

24 July 2021	Vindbjart (4)	0–1	(3) Fløy	Vennesla
16:00 CEST (UTC+2)		Report	T. Nygaard 36'	Stadium: Sparebanken Sør-banen Vennesla; Attendance: 476; Referee: Zyad T. Qashua

24 July 2021	Volda (4)	2–4 (a.e.t.)	(1) Kristiansund	Volda
16:00 CEST (UTC+2)	K. Myklebust 14', 42'	Report	Willumsson 61', 110', 119'; Diop 86'	Stadium: Volda Stadion; Attendance: 573; Referee: Torgeir Halsen

24 July 2021	Årdal (4)	0–1 (a.e.t.)	(3) Florø	Øvre Årdal
16:00 CEST (UTC+2)		Report	Nelsinho 94'	Stadium: Jotun Stadion; Attendance: 300; Referee: Markus Nybø Bakke

24 July 2021	Lokomotiv Oslo (4)	0–1	(3) Kjelsås	Oslo
18:00 CEST (UTC+2)		Report	H. Rusten 49'	Stadium: Tørteberg Kunstgress 2 Referee: Jonas Johnsen

25 July 2021	Flint (4)	1–2	(3) Fram Larvik	Tønsberg
14:00 CEST (UTC+2)	V. Deletic 11'	Report	T. Kongerud 71'; S. Bojadzic 84'	Stadium: Flint Esso Arena; Referee: Rune Nilsen

25 July 2021	Harstad (5)	2–0	(4) Melbo	Harstad
15:00 CEST (UTC+2)	M. Kjelseth 18'; T. Windstad 75'	Report		Stadium: Harstad Stadion; Referee: Ole Ragnar J. Knutsen

25 July 2021	Spjelkavik (4)	1–4	(1) Molde	Ålesund
15:00 CEST (UTC+2)	Ø. Heia 87'	Report	Grødem 32'; Fofana 62'; Brynhildsen 64'; Tjåland 90+3'	Stadium: Spjelkavik Stadion; Attendance: 800; Referee: Mathias Smehus Kringstad

25 July 2021	Stovner (4)	2–5	(2) Grorud	Oslo
15:00 CEST (UTC+2)	S. Jafar 8'; L. Fajfric 55'	Report	B. Kristensen 26'; H. Bredeli 52'; Aga 61', 77'; R. Essaeh 90'	Stadium: Rommensletta Kunstgress; Attendance: 240; Referee: Hakan Catalgøl

25 July 2021	Hønefoss (4)	0–2	(1) Strømsgodset	Hønefoss
16:00 CEST (UTC+2)		Report	Maigaard 21' (pen.); Hove 78'	Stadium: Hønefoss Idrettspark; Referee: Marius Lien

25 July 2021	Lysekloster (4)	1–2	(2) Åsane	Os
16:00 CEST (UTC+2)	H. Rinde 88'	Report	Herrem 29'; S. Nygard 61'	Stadium: Lysekloster Family Arena; Attendance: 420; Referee: Bjørn Tore Tvedt

25 July 2021	Lørenskog (4)	1–2	(2) Strømmen	Lørenskog
16:00 CEST (UTC+2)	M. Andresen 31'	Report	S. Birkeland 87', 90+3'	Stadium: Kurlandsparken; Attendance: 250; Referee: Henrik Andreas Grenå Pettersen

25 July 2021	Nybergsund (4)	0–1	(2) Raufoss	Nybergsund
16:00 CEST (UTC+2)		Report	M. Ndiaye 10'	Stadium: Nybergsund Stadion; Attendance: 221; Referee: Anders Bodding

25 July 2021	Oppsal (4)	0–2	(3) Skeid	Oslo
16:00 CEST (UTC+2)		Report	G. Andersen 14'; A. Agouda 58'	Stadium: Trasop Kunstgress; Referee: Herman Bostad

25 July 2021	Rana (4)	1–4	(1) Bodø/Glimt	Mo i Rana
16:00 CEST (UTC+2)	K. Råde 27'	Report	Nordås 59', 62', 78' (pen.); M. Bjørnmyr 65' (o.g.)	Stadium: Nye Sagbakken Stadion; Attendance: 600; Referee: Martin Berg

25 July 2021	Strindheim (4)	2–4	(4) Orkla	Trondheim
16:00 CEST (UTC+2)	P. Strand 35'; E. Johnsen 88' (o.g.)	Report	E. Lynum 16', 52'; H. Blomseth 45'; O. Løkken 90'	Stadium: Ruta Arena; Referee: Veronika Fjeldvær

25 July 2021	Træff (4)	0–4	(2) Aalesund	Molde
16:00 CEST (UTC+2)		Report	Segberg 16'; Määttä 34'; Grønner 71'; Haugen 78'	Stadium: Reknesbanen; Attendance: 200; Referee: Daniel Refsnes

25 July 2021	Ullern (4)	3–1	(3) Asker	Oslo
16:00 CEST (UTC+2)	F. Jor 48' (pen.); L. Følstad 51'; H. Mufoncol 78'	Report	Mauritz-Hansen 45'	Stadium: Ullern Kunstgress; Attendance: 125; Referee: orten Andersen-Gott

25 July 2021	Verdal (5)	0–6	(3) Nardo	Verdalsøra
16:00 CEST (UTC+2)		Report	Ø. Haugen 1', 53'; I. Hustad 25', 48'; R. Chikh 86'; J. Strand 90'	Stadium: Coop Arena Verdal; Attendance: 250; Referee: Haakon Arve Pedersen Bue

25 July 2021	Ørn Horten (4)	1–2	(2) Ull/Kisa	Horten
16:00 CEST (UTC+2)	N. Soares 24'	Report	Rakneberg 61'; Sørløkk 80' (pen.)	Stadium: Lystlunden; Attendance: 272; Referee: Herman Holthe

25 July 2021	Lyn (4)	0–4	(1) Vålerenga	Oslo
16:15 CEST (UTC+2)		Report	Skaret 18'; Bjørdal 27'; Udahl 49'; Christensen 70'	Stadium: Bislett Stadium; Attendance: 2,651; Referee: Mohammad Usman Aslam

25 July 2021	Kråkerøy (4)	0–3	(2) Fredrikstad	Fredrikstad
17:00 CEST (UTC+2)		Report	M. Johansen 56' (o.g.); Solberg 81'; L. Begby 84'	Stadium: Fredrikstad Stadion; Attendance: 650; Referee: Mohammad Hafezi

25 July 2021	Brumunddal (4)	1–2	(2) HamKam	Brumunddal
18:00 CEST (UTC+2)	J. Nysæter 51'	Report	A. Berisha 3'; Enkerud 83'	Stadium: Sveum Idrettspark; Attendance: 700; Referee: Sebastian Mikalsen

25 July 2021	Byåsen (4)	3–4 (a.e.t.)	(2) Ranheim	Trondheim
18:00 CEST (UTC+2)	S. Nordskag 13' (pen.); E. Selnes 37'; M. Risan 86'	Report	Brattbakk 10'; Reginiussen 45+2'; Tromsdal 78'; Marklund 102'	Stadium: Byåsen Arena; Attendance: 248; Referee: Mats Thorsø Hansen

25 July 2021	Donn (4)	1–2	(2) Jerv	Kristiansand
18:00 CEST (UTC+2)	A. Sersland 54'	Report	Fandi 77'; Norheim 86'	Stadium: Kristiansand Stadion; Referee: Jørgen Haga

25 July 2021	Halsen (4)	1–5	(3) Notodden	Larvik
14:00 CEST (UTC+2)	I. Nilsen 20'	Report	T. Lillo 2'; T. Dvergsdal 16', 81'; S. Røed 52', 56'	Attendance: 100; Referee: Håvard Bjerkelund

25 July 2021	Kvik Halden (3)	0–2	(1) Sarpsborg 08	Halden
18:00 CEST (UTC+2)		Report	D. Mehmeti 45' (o.g.); Skålevik 90+5'	Stadium: Halden Stadion; Attendance: 671; Referee: Abdulhadi Al-Fahad

25 July 2021	Melhus (4)	0–7	(1) Rosenborg	Melhus
18:00 CEST (UTC+2)		Report	Islamović 24'; Hovland 57'; Wiedesheim-Paul 73', 75'; M. Broholm 90'; E. Grilstad 90+2' (o.g.); Šerbečić 90+4'	Stadium: Gruva Nedre; Attendance: 730; Referee: Oliver Skaret Barsøe

25 July 2021	Os (4)	2–6	(3) Øygarden	Os
18:00 CEST (UTC+2)	N. Fosen 46'; S. Kvittingen 75'	Report	M. Eiane 8', 37', 54', 59', 78'; E. Moldenes 22'	Stadium: Kuventræ; Referee: Mattias Gripsgård Sakstad

25 July 2021	Pors (4)	1–4	(1) Sandefjord	Porsgrunn
18:00 CEST (UTC+2)	S. Thorsen 72'	Report	Mørk 58'; Sødlund 61'; Gussiås 67' (pen.); Jónsson 85'	Stadium: Pors Stadion; Attendance: 733; Referee: Herman Leiulfsrud Aass

25 July 2021	Ready (4)	4–0	(5) Grei	Oslo
18:00 CEST (UTC+2)	M. Bråten 18', 30', 35'; M. Seip 44'	Report		Stadium: Gressbanen; Referee: Philip George Aarskog

25 July 2021	Sandviken (4)	1–2 (a.e.t.)	(4) Fyllingsdalen	Bergen
18:00 CEST (UTC+2)	A. Selnes 80'	Report	Huseklepp 15'; K. Bergset	Stadium: Stemmemyren Kunstgress; Attendance: 250; Referee: Eirik Wisted-Thu

25 July 2021	Sola (4)	1–0	(4) Madla	Sola
18:00 CEST (UTC+2)	S. Berntsen 39'	Report		Stadium: Sola Stadion; Referee: Cecilie Frøyland

25 July 2021	Staal Jørpeland (4)	2–3	(1) Viking	Jørpeland
18:00 CEST (UTC+2)	Østensen 56' (pen.), 83'	Report	Friðjónsson 25'; Vikstøl 59'; Sebulonsen 85'	Stadium: Jørpeland Stadion; Attendance: 800; Referee: Ola Kellerhals

25 July 2021	Vestfossen (5)	1–3	(3) Moss	Vestfossen
18:00 CEST (UTC+2)	J. Sandengen 45'	Report	C. Skårn 28', 32', 90'	Stadium: RVS Parken Vestfossen Gress; Attendance: 200; Referee: Per Oscar Grov Heiberg

25 July 2021	Åkra (4)	2–2 (a.e.t.) (5–4 p)	(3) Vard Haugesund	Åkrehamn
18:00 CEST (UTC+2)	J. Rasmussen 14' (pen.), 51'	Report	Kling 12'; A. Underhaug 28'	Stadium: Åkra Idrettspark; Referee: Karoline Marie Jensen
	Penalties
	D. Tveit (penalty scored); P. Fauskanger (penalty scored); D. Aarås (penalty scored); J. Rasmussen (penalty scored); E. Høvring (penalty scored)		(penalty scored) A. Underhaug; (penalty missed) E. Ndayisenga; (penalty scored) S. Barane; (penalty scored) M. Nordtveit; (penalty scored) Kling

25 July 2021	Åssiden (4)	0–3	(1) Mjøndalen	Drammen
18:00 CEST (UTC+2)		Report	Ibrahim 9'; Aasmundsen 61'; Scriven 69'	Stadium: Åssiden Stadion; Attendance: 500; Referee: Magnus Nicolai Koløy

== Second round ==
The draw for the second round was made on 26 July 2021.

Number of teams per tier entering this round
Eliteserien (1)	1. divisjon (2)	2. divisjon (3)	3. divisjon (4)	4. divisjon (5)	Total
15 / 16	16 / 16	18 / 28	14 / 84	1 / 272	64 / 416

31 July 2021	Kongsvinger (3)	3–0	(2) Strømmen	Kongsvinger
15:00 CEST (UTC+2)	Güven 3', 73'; Andersen 54'	Report		Stadium: Gjemselund Stadion; Attendance: 763; Referee: Anders Bodding

31 July 2021	Vidar (4)	0–2	(2) Start	Stavanger
15:00 CEST (UTC+2)		Report	Schulze 12'; Akinyemi 90+1'	Stadium: Lassa Idrettspark; Attendance: 500; Referee: Ola Kellerhals

31 July 2021	Florø (3)	1–5	(2) Sogndal	Florø
15:00 CEST (UTC+2)	A. Brahimi 18'	Report	K. Hoven 15', 29', 42', 58'; T. Bjørnebye 45+1'	Stadium: Florø Stadion; Attendance: 325; Referee: Sondre Brudvik

31 July 2021	Gjøvik-Lyn (4)	0–3	(2) HamKam	Gjøvik
16:00 CEST (UTC+2)		Report	Enkerud 32', 40'; Lindkvist 38'	Stadium: Gjøvik Stadion; Attendance: 484; Referee: Tom Harald Hagen

31 July 2021	Sola (4)	0–6	(2) Bryne	Sola
16:00 CEST (UTC+2)		Report	Holtan 4', 37' (pen.); Baldvinsson 34'; M. Andersen 53'; R. Undheim 57'; A. Dybevik 77'	Stadium: Sola Stadion; Attendance: 350; Referee: Jørgen Haga

31 July 2021	Stord (4)	0–4	(2) Åsane	Stord
16:00 CEST (UTC+2)		Report	S. Austevoll 19'; Lorentzen 30'; M. Ueland 42'; J. Vågen 77'	Stadium: Stord Stadion; Attendance: 799; Referee: Aleksander S. Vermundsen

31 July 2021	Brattvåg (3)	2–3	(2) Aalesund	Brattvåg
16:00 CEST (UTC+2)	S. Lille-Løvø 7', 57'	Report	Ødemarksbakken 45'; Haugen 51'; Nordli 59'	Stadium: Brattvåg Stadion; Attendance: 494; Referee: Mathias Smehus Kringstad

31 July 2021	Harstad (5)	2–2 (a.e.t.) (4–3 p)	(3) Senja	Harstad
16:00 CEST (UTC+2)	T. Windstad 43'; M. Ingebrigtsen 46'	Report	R. Johansen 65'; B. Karlsen 83'	Stadium: Harstad Stadion; Attendance: 400; Referee: Herman Holthe
	Penalties
	M. Ingebrigtsen (penalty missed); O. Alvereng (penalty scored); J. Pedersen (penalty scored); E. Kajander (penalty scored); M. Kjelseth (penalty scored)		(penalty missed) M. Johnsgård; (penalty scored) G. Severinsen; (penalty missed) M. Berg; (penalty scored) A. Eliassen; (penalty scored) R. Johansen

31 July 2021	Fløya (3)	1–5	(2) KFUM Oslo	Tromsø
16:00 CEST (UTC+2)	B. Berg-Johansen 49'	Report	P. Romsaas 10'; A. Sanyang 31'; J. Moula 38', 73'; Lindquist 59'	Stadium: Fløya Arena; Attendance: 150; Referee: Hakan Catalgøl

1 August 2021	Nardo (3)	3–0	(2) Stjørdals-Blink	Trondheim
13:00 CEST (UTC+2)	H. Hammer 24'; J. Skille 45+3' (pen.); A. Krokbø 90'	Report		Stadium: Nissekollen Kunstgress; Attendance: 200; Referee: Oliver Skaret Barsøe

1 August 2021	Fana (4)	0–3	(1) Brann	Bergen
14:00 CEST (UTC+2)		Report	Pedersen 17', 78'; Taylor 90+3'	Stadium: Varden Amfi; Attendance: 700; Referee: Torgeir Halsen

1 August 2021	Alta (3)	3–1	(1) Tromsø	Alta
14:00 CEST (UTC+2)	C. Reginiussen 16', 82' el Ghaouti 28'	Report	Antonsen 45+2'	Stadium: SmartDok Arena; Referee: Ole-Alexander Ekeli Valen

1 August 2021	Eidsvold Turn (3)	1–3	(2) Raufoss	Eidsvoll
15:00 CEST (UTC+2)	H. Henriksen 1'	Report	Karlsbakk 6'; S. Werni 18'; M. Alm 27'	Stadium: Myhrer Stadion; Attendance: 225; Referee: Sander Johannessen

1 August 2021	Fløy (3)	2–2 (a.e.t.) (4–1 p)	(2) Jerv	Flekkerøy
15:00 CEST (UTC+2)	T. Nygaard 22', 101'	Report	Campos 66'; Fandi 113'	Stadium: Arkicon Arena Flekkerøy; Attendance: 200; Referee: Sebastian Mikalsen
	Penalties
	T. Nygaard (penalty scored); M. Holt (penalty scored); S. Ystanes (penalty scored); M. Grundetjern (penalty scored)		(penalty scored) Wichmann; (penalty missed) Fandi; (penalty missed) Furtado

1 August 2021	Ullern (4)	1–3 (a.e.t.)	(1) Vålerenga	Oslo
16:00 CEST (UTC+2)	L. Følstad 86'	Report	Christensen 82'; Jensen 92'; Jatta 95'	Stadium: Ullern Kunstgress; Attendance: 721; Referee: Stian Røvig Sletner

1 August 2021	Djerv 1919 (4)	0–2	(1) Viking	Haugesund
16:00 CEST (UTC+2)		Report	Berisha 36', 73' (pen.)	Stadium: Djervbanen; Attendance: 500; Referee: Daniel Higraff

1 August 2021	Hødd (3)	1–2	(1) Molde	Ulsteinvik
16:00 CEST (UTC+2)	B. Rise 69'	Report	Grødem 35' (pen.), 90+1' (pen.)	Stadium: Nye Høddvoll; Attendance: 970; Referee: Harald Røvig Sletner

1 August 2021	Levanger (3)	0–2	(2) Ranheim	Levanger
16:00 CEST (UTC+2)		Report	Melkersen 66'; Brattbakk 71'	Stadium: TOBB Arena Levanger; Attendance: 395; Referee: Herman Leiulfsrud Aass

1 August 2021	Skeid (3)	1–2 (a.e.t.)	(1) Lillestrøm	Oslo
16:15 CEST (UTC+2)	Buduson 58'	Report	Svendsen 52'; Olsen 97'	Stadium: Nordre Åsen; Attendance: 650; Referee: Rohit Saggi

1 August 2021	Moss (3)	3–1	(2) Fredrikstad	Moss
18:00 CEST (UTC+2)	T. Jakobsen 48' (pen.); U. Pedersen 81'; C. Skårn 90'	Report	Solberg 35'	Stadium: Melløs Stadion; Attendance: 800; Referee: Marius Lien

1 August 2021	Nordstrand (4)	0–3	(1) Sarpsborg 08	Oslo
18:00 CEST (UTC+2)		Report	Dyrestam 34'; Opseth 47'; Salétros 67'	Stadium: Nordstrand Kunstgress; Attendance: 563; Referee: Jørgen Haugen

1 August 2021	Kjelsås (3)	0–1	(2) Grorud	Oslo
18:00 CEST (UTC+2)		Report	Zafeiris 79'	Stadium: Grefsen Stadion; Attendance: 200; Referee: Mohammad Hafezi

1 August 2021	Ready (4)	0–1	(1) Strømsgodset	Oslo
18:00 CEST (UTC+2)		Report	Gunnarsson 70'	Stadium: Gressbanen; Referee: Johan William Grundt

1 August 2021	Ull/Kisa (2)	0–1	(1) Stabæk	Jessheim
18:00 CEST (UTC+2)		Report	Hansen 37'	Stadium: Jessheim Stadion; Attendance: 650; Referee: Ali al Hatam

1 August 2021	Notodden (3)	0–3	(1) Mjøndalen	Notodden
18:00 CEST (UTC+2)		Report	Øverby 17'; Nakkim 45', 77'	Stadium: Optime Arena; Attendance: 507; Referee: Ajdin Medic

1 August 2021	Fram Larvik (3)	0–1	(1) Odd	Larvik
18:00 CEST (UTC+2)		Report	Rólantsson 36'	Stadium: Framparken; Attendance: 800; Referee: Magnus Nicolay Koløy

1 August 2021	Arendal (3)	5–4 (a.e.t.)	(1) Sandefjord	Arendal
18:00 CEST (UTC+2)	T. Hafstad 27'; O. Hovstad 52'; Hellum 60'; Mladenovic 95'; D. Roppestad 105+1'	Report	Gussiås 15', 50'; Nyenetue 45+2'; Jónsson 118'	Stadium: Norac Stadion; Attendance: 802; Referee: Svein Tore Sinnes

1 August 2021	Åkra (4)	2–3 (a.e.t.)	(2) Sandnes Ulf	Åkrehamn
18:00 CEST (UTC+2)	J. Finne 24'; P. Fauskanger 90+4'	Report	Hustad 30'; Bringaker 38'; Øveraas 115'	Stadium: Åkra Idrettspark; Referee: Mischa Kellerhals

1 August 2021	Orkla (4)	1–11	(1) Rosenborg	Orkanger
18:00 CEST (UTC+2)	E. Helgetun 38'	Report	Skarsem 11', 43'; Islamović 16', 29', 34', 51'; Reitan 21'; Ceide 23', 60', 88'; Konradsen 63'	Stadium: Fannremsmoen; Attendance: 600; Referee: Marius Hansen Grøtta

1 August 2021	Tiller (4)	1–5	(1) Kristiansund	Trondheim
18:00 CEST (UTC+2)	O. Bugten 82'	Report	O. Sivertsen 27'; Gjertsen 61'; Isaksen 74'; Muçolli 84'; Bye 90+4'	Stadium: Tobb Arena Sør; Attendance: 500; Referee: Dag Vidar Hafsås

1 August 2021	Junkeren (4)	1–3	(1) Bodø/Glimt	Bodø
18:00 CEST (UTC+2)	I. Unhjem 58' (pen.)	Report	Hagen 3'; Berg 67'; Nordås 72'	Stadium: Stordalen Kunstgress; Attendance: 645; Referee: Anders Bodding

1 August 2021	Fyllingsdalen (4)	1–2	(3) Øygarden	Bergen
19:00 CEST (UTC+2)	M. Christophersen 6'	Report	M. Eiane 5'; J. Edvardsen 83'	Stadium: Varden Amfi; Attendance: 500; Referee: Abdulhadi Al-Fahad

== Third round ==
The draw for the third round was made on 5 August 2021. All the matches were played on 22 September 2021.

Number of teams per tier entering this round
Eliteserien (1)	1. divisjon (2)	2. divisjon (3)	3. divisjon (4)	4. divisjon (5)	Total
13 / 16	11 / 16	7 / 28	0 / 84	1 / 272	32 / 416

22 September 2021	Grorud (2)	2–3 (a.e.t.)	(1) Lillestrøm	Oslo
17:00 CEST (UTC+2)	H. Bredeli 35' (pen.); O. Drammeh 40'	Report	Mathew 26'; Dragsnes 89'; Olsen 106'	Stadium: Grorud Arctic Match; Attendance: 580; Referee: Svein Tore Sinnes

22 September 2021	KFUM Oslo (2)	3–1	(1) Kristiansund	Oslo
17:00 CEST (UTC+2)	R. Svindland 15'; A. Sanyang 51' (pen.); Njie 67'	Report	Gjertsen 17'	Stadium: KFUM Arena; Attendance: 663; Referee: Marius Lien

22 September 2021	Harstad (5)	0–5	(1) Brann	Harstad
18:00 CEST (UTC+2)		Report	Rasmussen 18'; Simba 50'; Heggebø 62', 65'; Sakor 71'	Stadium: Harstad Stadion; Attendance: 1,000; Referee: Eivind Bodding

22 September 2021	Kongsvinger (3)	4–1	(3) Fløy	Kongsvinger
18:00 CEST (UTC+2)	B. Pedersen 16'; Andersen 56'; Güven 73', 84'	Report	A. Hauge 76'	Stadium: Gjemselund Stadion; Attendance: 803; Referee: Magnus Nicolai Koløy

22 September 2021	Start (2)	4–2	(1) Mjøndalen	Kristiansand
18:00 CEST (UTC+2)	Ugland 33'; Ramsland 58'; Markovic 62'; Sjøkvist 67'	Report	Twum 39'; Bækken 87'	Stadium: Sør Arena; Attendance: 1,108; Referee: Marius Hansen Grøtta

22 September 2021	Alta (3)	1–2	(1) Bodø/Glimt	Alta
18:00 CEST (UTC+2)	C. Reginiussen 89'	Report	Kvile 45'; Sampsted 50'	Stadium: Finnmarkshallen; Attendance: 600; Referee: Christian Moen

22 September 2021	Vålerenga (1)	0–3	(1) Odd	Oslo
18:00 CEST (UTC+2)		Report	Jevtović 20'; Svendsen 58', 60'	Stadium: Intility Arena; Attendance: 2,913; Referee: Kai Erik Steen

22 September 2021	Øygarden (3)	0–5	(1) Sarpsborg 08	Ågotnes
18:00 CEST (UTC+2)		Report	Salétros 1'; Opseth 24', 37', 56'; Halvorsen 59'	Stadium: Ågotnes Stadion; Attendance: 300; Referee: Steinar Hauge

22 September 2021	Nardo (3)	2–2 (a.e.t.) (5–3 p)	(3) Arendal	Trondheim
18:00 CEST (UTC+2)	A. Krokbø 4'; S. Laugsand 8'	Report	Hellum 14'; M. Madsen 90+3'	Stadium: MUS Stadion Sandskogan; Attendance: 140; Referee: Mathias Støfringshaug
	Penalties
	H. Olsen (penalty scored); J. Skille (penalty scored); J. Lie (penalty scored); R. Chikh (penalty scored); M. Sandvik (penalty scored)		(penalty scored) Hellum; (penalty scored) Kiilerich; (penalty scored) S. Berge; (penalty missed) O. Håbestad

22 September 2021	Ranheim (2)	1–1 (a.e.t.) (1–3 p)	(2) Aalesund	Trondheim
18:00 CEST (UTC+2)	Melkersen 15'	Report	Diaw 90+1'	Stadium: EXTRA Arena; Attendance: 650; Referee: Daniel Higraff
	Penalties
	Tønne (penalty missed); Kvande (penalty missed); Erlien (penalty missed); Tromsdal (penalty scored)		(penalty scored) Jansen; (penalty missed) Nordli; (penalty missed) Castro; (penalty scored) N. Hopland; (penalty scored) Ólafsson

22 September 2021	Strømsgodset (1)	5–1	(1) Stabæk	Drammen
18:00 CEST (UTC+2)	Stenevik 13'; Valsvik 44'; Kadiri 65', 69', 72'	Report	Ottesen 5'	Stadium: Marienlyst Stadion; Attendance: 1,700; Referee: Kristoffer Hagenes

22 September 2021	Bryne (2)	1–4	(1) Molde	Bryne
18:00 CEST (UTC+2)	A. Dybevik 19'	Report	Eikrem 12'; Grødem 26'; Andersen 63'; Bjørnbak 75'	Stadium: Bryne Stadion; Attendance: 730; Referee: Jan Morten Tennøy

22 September 2021	Sogndal (2)	0–2	(2) Åsane	Sogndal
18:00 CEST (UTC+2)		Report	Auklend 19'; Lorentzen 74'	Stadium: Fosshaugane Campus; Attendance: 623; Referee: Sigurd Smehus Kringstad

22 September 2021	Moss (3)	1–7	(2) Sandnes Ulf	Moss
18:00 CEST (UTC+2)	T. Jakobsen 15' (pen.)	Report	Ekeland 22', 73'; Baidoo 23'; Bringaker 29'; Hustad 39'; M. Effiom 67', 81'	Stadium: Melløs Stadion; Attendance: 214; Referee: Harald Røvig Sletner

22 September 2021	HamKam (2)	1–2	(2) Raufoss	Hamar
18:00 CEST (UTC+2)	Onsrud 22'	Report	Helmersen 20', 37'	Stadium: Briskeby Arena; Attendance: 2,000; Referee: Tom Harald Hagen

22 September 2021	Viking (1)	3–1	(1) Rosenborg	Stavanger
20:10 CEST (UTC+2)	Løkberg 33' de Lanlay 50'; Tripić 79'	Report	Holse 61'	Stadium: Viking Stadion; Attendance: 4,511; Referee: Rohit Saggi

== Fourth round ==
The draw for the fourth round was made on 22 September 2021. All the matches were set to be played on 12 and 13 March 2022. However, on 2 March, the match between Aalesund and Bodø/Glimt was moved from 13 March to 6 March due to Bodø/Glimt's participation in the 2021–22 UEFA Europa Conference League round of 16. On 4 March, the match was cancelled because Aalesund did not have enough players available on the new date.

Number of teams per tier entering this round (Note: Note that some teams have changed division since the third round, which was played in 2021)
Eliteserien (1)	1. divisjon (2)	2. divisjon (3)	3. divisjon (4)	4. divisjon (5)	Total
8 / 16	7 / 16	0 / 28	1 / 84	0 / 272	16 / 416

6 March 2022	Aalesund (1)	w/o	(1) Bodø/Glimt	Ålesund
18:00 CET (UTC+1)		Report		Stadium: Color Line Stadion

12 March 2022	KFUM Oslo (2)	1–0	(2) Brann	Oslo
15:00 CET (UTC+1)	Njie 60'	Report		Stadium: Intility Arena; Attendance: 2,239; Referee: Marius Hansen Grøtta

12 March 2022	Kongsvinger (2)	0–2	(1) Viking	Kongsvinger
15:00 CET (UTC+1)		Report	Tripić 1'; Friðjónsson 46'	Stadium: Gjemselund Stadion; Attendance: 1,765; Referee: Espen Eskås

12 March 2022	Raufoss (2)	1–1 (a.e.t.) (5–6 p)	(1) Strømsgodset	Raufoss
15:00 CET (UTC+1)	G. Simenstad 115'	Report	Salvesen 104'	Stadium: Raufoss Storhall; Referee: Ola Hobber Nilsen
	Penalties
	M. Johnsgård (penalty scored); M. Fagernes (penalty scored); E. Bydal (penalty scored); G. Simenstad (penalty scored); M. Aanesland (penalty missed); S. Westerlund (penalty scored); N. Fremstad (penalty missed)		(penalty scored) Stengel; (penalty missed) Salvesen; (penalty scored) Vilsvik; (penalty scored) Hove; (penalty scored) Sætra; (penalty scored) Friday; (penalty scored) Gulliksen

12 March 2022	Sandnes Ulf (2)	2–0	(2) Start	Sandnes
15:00 CET (UTC+1)	Høiland 22', 41' (pen.)	Report		Stadium: Øster Hus Arena; Attendance: 2,630; Referee: Mohammed Usman Aslam

13 March 2022	Nardo (4)	0–4	(1) Lillestrøm	Trondheim
15:00 CET (UTC+1)		Report	Helland 29', 53'; Pettersson 36'; Adams 87'	Stadium: Extra Arena; Attendance: 900; Referee: Sivert Amland

13 March 2022	Åsane (2)	0–5	(1) Sarpsborg 08	Bergen
17:00 CET (UTC+1)		Report	Wichne 21'; Molins 23', 36', 45'; Halvorsen 33'	Stadium: Åsane Arena; Attendance: 858; Referee: Tore Hansen

13 March 2022	Molde (1)	3–2 (a.e.t.)	(1) Odd	Molde
20:10 CET (UTC+1)	Andersen 82'; Fofana 116'; Haugen 119'	Report	Jørgensen 12'; Rólantsson 105'	Stadium: Aker Stadion; Referee: Tom Harald Hagen

== Quarter-finals ==
The draw for the quarter-finals was made on 27 January 2022. The matches were played on 19 and 20 March 2022.

Number of teams per tier entering this round
Eliteserien (1)	1. divisjon (2)	2. divisjon (3)	3. divisjon (4)	4. divisjon (5)	Total
6 / 16	2 / 16	0 / 28	0 / 84	0 / 272	8 / 416

19 March 2022	KFUM Oslo (2)	0–5	(1) Viking	Oslo
16:15 CET (UTC+1)		Report	Berisha 2', 69'; Kabran 23'; Sandberg 84', 90+2'	Stadium: Intility Arena; Attendance: 1,627; Referee: Sigurd Smehus Kringstad

19 March 2022	Sandnes Ulf (2)	0–4	(1) Strømsgodset	Sandnes
20:00 CET (UTC+1)		Report	Krasniqi 3', 53'; Gulliksen 58'; Salvesen 83'	Stadium: Øster Hus Arena; Attendance: 3,029; Referee: Kai Erik Steen

20 March 2022	Molde (1)	4–2	(1) Sarpsborg 08	Molde
16:15 CET (UTC+1)	Brynhildsen 21'; Eikrem 48'; Andersen 80'; Linnes 90+2'	Report	Maigaard 5'; Skålevik 76'	Stadium: Aker Stadion; Attendance: 3,309; Referee: Rohit Saggi

20 March 2022	Bodø/Glimt (1)	4–1	(1) Lillestrøm	Bodø
20:00 CET (UTC+1)	Espejord 37'; Hagen 53'; Pellegrino 87'; Boniface 90+2'	Report	Dragsnes 13'	Stadium: Aspmyra Stadion; Attendance: 3,181; Referee: Kristoffer Hagenes

== Semi-finals ==
The draw for the semi-finals was made on 20 March 2022. The matches were played on 6 and 21 April 2022.

Number of teams per tier entering this round
Eliteserien (1)	1. divisjon (2)	2. divisjon (3)	3. divisjon (4)	4. divisjon (5)	Total
4 / 16	0 / 16	0 / 28	0 / 84	0 / 272	4 / 416

6 April 2022	Molde (1)	3–0	(1) Strømsgodset	Molde
18:00 CEST (UTC+2)	Eikrem 58', 78'; Leifsson 88' (o.g.)	Report		Stadium: Aker Stadion; Attendance: 3,805; Referee: Espen Eskås

21 April 2022	Bodø/Glimt (1)	2–1	(1) Viking	Bodø
20:10 CEST (UTC+2)	Espejord 17'; Koomson 38'	Report	Berisha 12' (pen.)	Stadium: Aspmyra Stadion; Attendance: 5,123; Referee: Ola Hobber Nilsen

== Final ==
The final was played on 1 May 2022.

1 May 2022
16:00 CEST (UTC+2)

Bodø/Glimt	0–1	Molde
	Report	Mannsverk 76' (pen.)

Ullevaal Stadion, Oslo
Attendance: 19,657
Referee: Rohit Saggi (Drafn)

== Top scorers ==
Rank	Player	Club	Goals
1	(Norway) Markus Eiane	Øygarden	6
2	(Norway) Veton Berisha	Viking	5
2	(Norway) Kristoffer Hoven	Sogndal	5
2	(Montenegro) Dino Islamović	Rosenborg	5
5	(Nigeria) Adeleke Akinyemi	Start	4
5	(Norway) Mathias Bringaker	Sandnes Ulf	4
5	(Norway) Magnus Wolff Eikrem	Molde	4
5	(Norway) Magnus Grødem	Molde	4
5	(Norway) Adem Güven	Kongsvinger	4
5	(Norway) Joacim Holtan	Bryne	4
5	(Norway) Lasse Nordås	Bodø/Glimt	4
5	(Norway) Kristian Fardal Opseth	Sarpsborg 08	4
5	(Norway) Christian Reginiussen	Alta	4
5	(Norway) Christoffer Skårn	Moss	4
