= 2020 Norwegian Third Division =

3. divisjon
- Season: 2020
- Champions: Cancelled
- Promoted: N/A
- Relegated: N/A

The 2020 3. divisjon (referred to as Norsk Tipping-ligaen for sponsorship reasons) was scheduled to be a fourth-tier Norwegian football league season. The league was supposed to consist of 84 teams divided into 6 groups of 14 teams each and should have begun on 13 April 2020.

The league should have been played as a double round-robin tournament, where all teams would play 26 matches.

In mid-July it was decided to bar all B teams ("2" teams) from promotion. As reserve players in professional clubs, they would have had the chance to train since May 2020, whereas the amateur teams were not allowed to train all spring and summer as a precaution during the COVID-19 pandemic in Norway.

The 2020 season was cancelled on 18 September.

== Team changes ==
The following teams have changed division since the 2019 season.

=== To 3. divisjon ===
Promoted from 4. divisjon

- 18 teams

Relegated from 2. divisjon

- Vidar
- Sola
- Byåsen
- Elverum
- Oppsal
- Mjølner

=== From 3. divisjon ===
Promoted to 2. divisjon

- Eidsvold Turn
- Vålerenga 2
- Fløy
- Vard Haugesund
- Rosenborg 2
- Fløya

Relegated to 4. divisjon

- 18 teams

== League tables ==
NOT PLAYED

=== Group 1 ===
Pos	Team	Pld	W	D	L	GF	GA	GD	Pts	Promotion or relegation
1	Brumunddal	0	0	0	0	0	0	0	0	Promotion to Second Division
2	Elverum	0	0	0	0	0	0	0	0	
3	Fu/Vo	0	0	0	0	0	0	0	0	
4	Gjelleråsen	0	0	0	0	0	0	0	0	
5	Gjøvik-Lyn	0	0	0	0	0	0	0	0	
6	Grorud 2	0	0	0	0	0	0	0	0	
7	Kongsvinger 2	0	0	0	0	0	0	0	0	
8	Lillestrøm 2	0	0	0	0	0	0	0	0	
9	Lørenskog	0	0	0	0	0	0	0	0	
10	Nybergsund	0	0	0	0	0	0	0	0	
11	Raufoss 2	0	0	0	0	0	0	0	0	
12	Rommen	0	0	0	0	0	0	0	0	Relegation to Fourth Division
13	Toten	0	0	0	0	0	0	0	0	Relegation to Fourth Division
14	Ull/Kisa 2	0	0	0	0	0	0	0	0	Relegation to Fourth Division

Source: fotball.no (in Norwegian)
Rules for classification: 1) Points; 2) Goal difference; 3) Goals scored; 4) Head-to-head points; 5) Head-to-head goal difference; 6) Head-to-head away goals scored (only if between two teams); 7) Head-to-head goals scored; 8) Play-off (only used to decide champions or relegation).

=== Group 2 ===
Pos	Team	Pld	W	D	L	GF	GA	GD	Pts	Promotion or relegation
1	Åssiden	0	0	0	0	0	0	0	0	Promotion to Second Division
2	Eik Tønsberg	0	0	0	0	0	0	0	0	
3	Flint	0	0	0	0	0	0	0	0	
4	Follo	0	0	0	0	0	0	0	0	
5	Fredrikstad 2	0	0	0	0	0	0	0	0	
6	Halsen	0	0	0	0	0	0	0	0	
7	Hønefoss	0	0	0	0	0	0	0	0	
8	Kråkerøy	0	0	0	0	0	0	0	0	
9	Mjøndalen 2	0	0	0	0	0	0	0	0	
10	Oppsal	0	0	0	0	0	0	0	0	
11	Ørn Horten	0	0	0	0	0	0	0	0	
12	Pors	0	0	0	0	0	0	0	0	Relegation to Fourth Division
13	Sarpsborg 08 2	0	0	0	0	0	0	0	0	Relegation to Fourth Division
14	Strømsgodset 2	0	0	0	0	0	0	0	0	Relegation to Fourth Division

Source: fotball.no (in Norwegian)
Rules for classification: 1) Points; 2) Goal difference; 3) Goals scored; 4) Head-to-head points; 5) Head-to-head goal difference; 6) Head-to-head away goals scored (only if between two teams); 7) Head-to-head goals scored; 8) Play-off (only used to decide champions or relegation).

=== Group 3 ===
Pos	Team	Pld	W	D	L	GF	GA	GD	Pts	Promotion or relegation
1	Åkra	0	0	0	0	0	0	0	0	Promotion to Second Division
2	Brodd	0	0	0	0	0	0	0	0	
3	Djerv 1919	0	0	0	0	0	0	0	0	
4	Donn	0	0	0	0	0	0	0	0	
5	Express	0	0	0	0	0	0	0	0	
6	Hinna	0	0	0	0	0	0	0	0	
7	Madla	0	0	0	0	0	0	0	0	
8	Mandalskameratene	0	0	0	0	0	0	0	0	
9	Sola	0	0	0	0	0	0	0	0	
10	Staal Jørpeland	0	0	0	0	0	0	0	0	
11	Start 2	0	0	0	0	0	0	0	0	
12	Vidar	0	0	0	0	0	0	0	0	Relegation to Fourth Division
13	Viking 2	0	0	0	0	0	0	0	0	Relegation to Fourth Division
14	Vindbjart	0	0	0	0	0	0	0	0	Relegation to Fourth Division

Source: fotball.no (in Norwegian)
Rules for classification: 1) Points; 2) Goal difference; 3) Goals scored; 4) Head-to-head points; 5) Head-to-head goal difference; 6) Head-to-head away goals scored (only if between two teams); 7) Head-to-head goals scored; 8) Play-off (only used to decide champions or relegation).

=== Group 4 ===
Pos	Team	Pld	W	D	L	GF	GA	GD	Pts	Promotion or relegation
1	Årdal	0	0	0	0	0	0	0	0	Promotion to Second Division
2	Bjarg	0	0	0	0	0	0	0	0	
3	Brann 2	0	0	0	0	0	0	0	0	
4	Fana	0	0	0	0	0	0	0	0	
5	Fjøra	0	0	0	0	0	0	0	0	
6	Frigg	0	0	0	0	0	0	0	0	
7	Fyllingsdalen	0	0	0	0	0	0	0	0	
8	Lyn	0	0	0	0	0	0	0	0	
9	Lysekloster	0	0	0	0	0	0	0	0	
10	Os	0	0	0	0	0	0	0	0	
11	Ready	0	0	0	0	0	0	0	0	
12	Sandviken	0	0	0	0	0	0	0	0	Relegation to Fourth Division
13	Sogndal 2	0	0	0	0	0	0	0	0	Relegation to Fourth Division
14	Stord	0	0	0	0	0	0	0	0	Relegation to Fourth Division

Source: fotball.no (in Norwegian)
Rules for classification: 1) Points; 2) Goal difference; 3) Goals scored; 4) Head-to-head points; 5) Head-to-head goal difference; 6) Head-to-head away goals scored (only if between two teams); 7) Head-to-head goals scored; 8) Play-off (only used to decide champions or relegation).

=== Group 5 ===
Pos	Team	Pld	W	D	L	GF	GA	GD	Pts	Promotion or relegation
1	Aalesund 2	0	0	0	0	0	0	0	0	Promotion to Second Division
2	Byåsen	0	0	0	0	0	0	0	0	
3	Kolstad	0	0	0	0	0	0	0	0	
4	Melhus	0	0	0	0	0	0	0	0	
5	Molde 2	0	0	0	0	0	0	0	0	
6	NTNUI	0	0	0	0	0	0	0	0	
7	Orkla	0	0	0	0	0	0	0	0	
8	Ranheim 2	0	0	0	0	0	0	0	0	
9	Spjelkavik	0	0	0	0	0	0	0	0	
10	Strindheim	0	0	0	0	0	0	0	0	
11	Tiller	0	0	0	0	0	0	0	0	
12	Træff	0	0	0	0	0	0	0	0	Relegation to Fourth Division
13	Tynset	0	0	0	0	0	0	0	0	Relegation to Fourth Division
14	Volda	0	0	0	0	0	0	0	0	Relegation to Fourth Division

Source: fotball.no (in Norwegian)
Rules for classification: 1) Points; 2) Goal difference; 3) Goals scored; 4) Head-to-head points; 5) Head-to-head goal difference; 6) Head-to-head away goals scored (only if between two teams); 7) Head-to-head goals scored; 8) Play-off (only used to decide champions or relegation).

=== Group 6 ===
Pos	Team	Pld	W	D	L	GF	GA	GD	Pts	Promotion or relegation
1	Bodø/Glimt 2	0	0	0	0	0	0	0	0	Promotion to Second Division
2	Finnsnes	0	0	0	0	0	0	0	0	
3	Junkeren	0	0	0	0	0	0	0	0	
4	Lokomotiv Oslo	0	0	0	0	0	0	0	0	
5	Melbo	0	0	0	0	0	0	0	0	
6	Mjølner	0	0	0	0	0	0	0	0	
7	Nordstrand	0	0	0	0	0	0	0	0	
8	Rana	0	0	0	0	0	0	0	0	
9	Skånland	0	0	0	0	0	0	0	0	
10	Skeid 2	0	0	0	0	0	0	0	0	
11	Skjervøy	0	0	0	0	0	0	0	0	
12	Stabæk 2	0	0	0	0	0	0	0	0	Relegation to Fourth Division
13	Tromsø 2	0	0	0	0	0	0	0	0	Relegation to Fourth Division
14	Ullern	0	0	0	0	0	0	0	0	Relegation to Fourth Division

Source: fotball.no (in Norwegian)
Rules for classification: 1) Points; 2) Goal difference; 3) Goals scored; 4) Head-to-head points; 5) Head-to-head goal difference; 6) Head-to-head away goals scored (only if between two teams); 7) Head-to-head goals scored; 8) Play-off (only used to decide champions or relegation).
