= Norwegian District Football Associations =

Local sports governing bodies in Norway

The District Football Associations are the local governing bodies of association football in Norway. District FAs exist to govern all aspects of local football in their defined areas, providing grassroots support to the Norwegian Football Federation by promoting and administering football, futsal and beach soccer in their respective districts. Prior to the establishment of a national league these local governing bodies organised their own regional leagues.

Most of the 18 District FAs align roughly with the boundaries of the historic and current Districts of Norway.

The District FAs administer youth football and the lower-tier leagues from the Fourth Division (men) and the Second Division (women), respectively, and further below.

The 18 district organisations are as follows:

- Agder Fotballkrets
- Akershus Fotballkrets
- Buskerud Fotballkrets
- Finnmark Fotballkrets
- Hålogaland Fotballkrets
- Hordaland Fotballkrets
- Indre Østland Fotballkrets
- Nordland Fotballkrets
- Nordmøre og Romsdal Fotballkrets
- Oslo Fotballkrets
- Østfold Fotballkrets
- Rogaland Fotballkrets
- Sogn og Fjordane Fotballkrets
- Sunnmøre Fotballkrets
- Telemark Fotballkrets
- Troms Fotballkrets
- Trøndelag Fotballkrets
- Vestfold Fotballkrets
