= 2021 Norwegian Third Division =

Norwegian football season

3. divisjon
- Season: 2021
- Promoted: Gjøvik-Lyn; Ørn Horten; Staal Jørpeland; Frigg; Træff; Ullern
- Relegated: 18 teams
- Matches played: 546
- Goals scored: 2,082 (3.81 per match)
- Top goalscorer: Vital Curtis Kaba (17 goals)

The 2021 3. divisjon (referred to as Norsk Tipping-ligaen for sponsorship reasons) was a fourth-tier Norwegian football league season. The league consisted of 84 teams divided into 6 groups of 14 teams each. The season began in early August 2021. All teams played 13 matches instead of the normal 26. Furthermore, all reserve teams ("2" teams) were barred from promotion.

== League tables ==
=== Group 1 ===
Pos	Team	Pld	W	D	L	GF	GA	GD	Pts	Promotion or relegation
1	Gjøvik-Lyn (P)	13	13	0	0	49	9	+40	39	Promotion to Second Division
2	Gjelleråsen	13	8	2	3	37	18	+19	26	
3	Elverum	13	7	4	2	27	18	+9	25	
4	Brumunddal	13	7	3	3	33	15	+18	24	
5	Kongsvinger 2	13	7	1	5	32	24	+8	22	
6	Lillestrøm 2	13	6	3	4	27	23	+4	21	
7	Lørenskog	13	5	3	5	18	17	+1	18	
8	Grorud 2	13	4	4	5	21	22	−1	16	
9	Raufoss 2	13	4	2	7	19	30	−11	14	
10	Toten	13	4	2	7	21	42	−21	14	
11	Fu/Vo	13	3	2	8	18	30	−12	11	
12	Nybergsund (R)	13	2	5	6	11	23	−12	11	Relegation to Fourth Division
13	Ull/Kisa 2 (R)	13	2	2	9	12	33	−21	8	Relegation to Fourth Division
14	Stovner (R)	13	1	3	9	12	33	−21	6	Relegation to Fourth Division

Source: NIFS (in Norwegian)
Rules for classification: 1) Points; 2) Goal difference; 3) Goals scored; 4) Head-to-head points; 5) Head-to-head goal difference; 6) Head-to-head goals scored.
(P) Promoted; (R) Relegated

=== Group 2 ===
Pos	Team	Pld	W	D	L	GF	GA	GD	Pts	Promotion or relegation
1	Ørn Horten (P)	13	9	2	2	32	12	+20	29	Promotion to Second Division
2	Eik Tønsberg	13	8	3	2	29	14	+15	27	
3	Pors	13	7	4	2	33	13	+20	25	
4	Hønefoss	13	7	4	2	28	18	+10	25	
5	Oppsal	13	5	4	4	17	20	−3	19	
6	Strømsgodset 2	13	5	3	5	34	29	+5	18	
7	Sarpsborg 08 2	13	5	3	5	26	28	−2	18	
8	Fredrikstad 2	13	4	5	4	28	21	+7	17	
9	Halsen	13	5	1	7	20	33	−13	16	
10	Follo	13	3	6	4	18	14	+4	15	
11	Mjøndalen 2	13	3	6	4	23	20	+3	15	
12	Flint (R)	13	4	3	6	21	26	−5	15	Relegation to Fourth Division
13	Kråkerøy (R)	13	3	1	9	16	32	−16	10	Relegation to Fourth Division
14	Åssiden (R)	13	0	1	12	10	55	−45	1	Relegation to Fourth Division

Source: NIFS (in Norwegian)
Rules for classification: 1) Points; 2) Goal difference; 3) Goals scored; 4) Head-to-head points; 5) Head-to-head goal difference; 6) Head-to-head goals scored.
(P) Promoted; (R) Relegated

=== Group 3 ===
Pos	Team	Pld	W	D	L	GF	GA	GD	Pts	Promotion or relegation
1	Staal Jørpeland (P)	13	8	3	2	30	18	+12	27	Promotion to Second Division
2	Sola	13	8	2	3	34	18	+16	26	
3	Vindbjart	13	8	1	4	32	24	+8	25	
4	Djerv 1919	13	6	4	3	25	18	+7	22	
5	Brodd	13	6	3	4	15	19	−4	21	
6	Viking 2	13	6	2	5	29	20	+9	20	
7	Start 2	13	5	4	4	24	15	+9	19	
8	Vidar	13	5	2	6	21	20	+1	17	
9	Åkra	13	4	5	4	21	23	−2	17	
10	Express	13	5	2	6	26	31	−5	17	
11	Mandalskameratene	13	4	4	5	27	22	+5	16	
12	Hinna (R)	13	3	2	8	15	29	−14	11	Relegation to Fourth Division
13	Madla (R)	13	3	1	9	18	36	−18	10	Relegation to Fourth Division
14	Donn (R)	13	2	1	10	17	41	−24	7	Relegation to Fourth Division

Source: NIFS (in Norwegian)
Rules for classification: 1) Points; 2) Goal difference; 3) Goals scored; 4) Head-to-head points; 5) Head-to-head goal difference; 6) Head-to-head goals scored.
(P) Promoted; (R) Relegated

=== Group 4 ===
Pos	Team	Pld	W	D	L	GF	GA	GD	Pts	Promotion or relegation
1	Frigg (P)	13	11	2	0	48	10	+38	35	Promotion to Second Division
2	Fana	13	11	1	1	43	16	+27	34	
3	Fyllingsdalen	13	9	0	4	34	22	+12	27	
4	Lyn	13	6	5	2	32	20	+12	23	
5	Bjarg	13	7	1	5	25	29	−4	22	
6	Os	13	5	3	5	26	27	−1	18	
7	Ready	13	4	4	5	25	24	+1	16	
8	Brann 2	13	5	0	8	34	30	+4	15	
9	Lysekloster	13	4	3	6	27	23	+4	15	
10	Sandviken	13	4	3	6	25	26	−1	15	
11	Stord	13	4	3	6	30	35	−5	15	
12	Fjøra (R)	13	4	1	8	26	32	−6	13	Relegation to Fourth Division
13	Årdal (R)	13	2	2	9	10	35	−25	8	Relegation to Fourth Division
14	Sogndal 2 (R)	13	0	2	11	7	63	−56	2	Relegation to Fourth Division

Source: NIFS (in Norwegian)
Rules for classification: 1) Points; 2) Goal difference; 3) Goals scored; 4) Head-to-head points; 5) Head-to-head goal difference; 6) Head-to-head goals scored.
(P) Promoted; (R) Relegated

=== Group 5 ===
Pos	Team	Pld	W	D	L	GF	GA	GD	Pts	Promotion or relegation
1	Træff (P)	13	10	1	2	41	20	+21	31	Promotion to Second Division
2	Spjelkavik	13	9	1	3	28	9	+19	28	
3	Strindheim	13	7	5	1	33	17	+16	26	
4	Aalesund 2	13	7	2	4	25	19	+6	23	
5	Kolstad	13	6	3	4	31	20	+11	21	
6	Byåsen	13	5	4	4	23	20	+3	19	
7	Tiller	13	5	3	5	22	21	+1	18	
8	Molde 2	13	5	2	6	24	21	+3	17	
9	Orkla	13	5	2	6	24	34	−10	17	
10	Volda	13	4	4	5	27	21	+6	16	
11	Melhus	13	4	3	6	14	19	−5	15	
12	Ranheim 2 (R)	13	3	3	7	24	50	−26	12	Relegation to Fourth Division
13	NTNUI (R)	13	2	3	8	18	31	−13	9	Relegation to Fourth Division
14	Tynset (R)	13	1	0	12	19	51	−32	3	Relegation to Fourth Division

Source: NIFS (in Norwegian)
Rules for classification: 1) Points; 2) Goal difference; 3) Goals scored; 4) Head-to-head points; 5) Head-to-head goal difference; 6) Head-to-head goals scored.
(P) Promoted; (R) Relegated

=== Group 6 ===
Pos	Team	Pld	W	D	L	GF	GA	GD	Pts	Promotion or relegation
1	Ullern (P)	13	11	2	0	36	9	+27	35	Promotion to Second Division
2	Lokomotiv Oslo	13	7	2	4	28	17	+11	23	
3	Junkeren	13	6	4	3	33	22	+11	22	
4	Tromsø 2	13	6	3	4	24	19	+5	21	
5	Stabæk 2	13	6	3	4	24	22	+2	21	
6	Nordstrand	13	6	2	5	20	20	0	20	
7	Mjølner	13	5	4	4	23	16	+7	19	
8	Rana	13	6	1	6	23	30	−7	19	
9	Bodø/Glimt 2	13	6	0	7	22	28	−6	18	
10	Skjervøy	13	5	2	6	19	21	−2	17	
11	Skeid 2	13	4	4	5	26	25	+1	16	
12	Melbo (R)	13	4	2	7	15	25	−10	14	Relegation to Fourth Division
13	Skånland (R)	13	2	1	10	15	35	−20	7	Relegation to Fourth Division
14	Finnsnes (R)	13	2	0	11	17	36	−19	6	Relegation to Fourth Division

Source: NIFS (in Norwegian)
Rules for classification: 1) Points; 2) Goal difference; 3) Goals scored; 4) Head-to-head points; 5) Head-to-head goal difference; 6) Head-to-head goals scored.
(P) Promoted; (R) Relegated

== Top scorers ==
Rank	Player	Club	Goals
1	(Norway) Vital Curtis Kaba	Frigg	17
2	(Norway) Rocky Lekaj	Gjøvik-Lyn	16
2	(Norway) Elias Heggland Myrlid	Brann 2	16
2	(Norway) Even Østensen	Staal Jørpeland	16
5	(Norway) Eirik Kjørsvik	Træff	14
6	(Norway) Peder Dovland	Mandalskameratene	13
7	(Norway) Ulrik Ferrer	Frigg	12
7	(Norway) Ørjan Isaksen Skallebø	Skjervøy	12
9	(Norway) Preben Finstad	Brumunddal	11
9	(Norway) Mikael Harbosen Haga	Træff	11
9	(Poland) Daniel Kraska	Toten	11
9	(Norway) Tim Nilsen	Lysekloster	11
9	(Norway) Magnus Solum	Elverum	11
9	(Norway) Sander Alvestad Svela	Start 2	11
