= Troms Fotballkrets =

District organisation of the Norwegian Football Federation

- Purpose: District Football Association
- Headquarters: Tromsø
- Location(s): Stadionveien 3 9007 Tromsø Norway
- Chairman: Ronald Martinsen
- Website: https://www.fotball.no/kretser/troms/

The Troms Fotballkrets (Troms Football Association) is one of the 18 district organisations of the Norwegian Football Federation. It administers lower tier football in Troms county.

== Background ==
Troms Fotballkrets, is the governing body for football in Troms county. The Association currently has 77 member clubs. Based in Tromsø, the Association's chairman is Ronald Martinsen.

== Affiliated members ==
The following clubs are affiliated to the Troms Fotballkrets:

- Bakkeby IK
- Bardu IL
- Bardufoss og Omegn IF
- Berserk FK (futsal)
- IL Blåmann
- Botnhamn UIL
- Brøstadbotn IL
- Burfjord IL
- Finnsnes IL
- Fjordgård IL
- IF Fløya
- FK Foot 04
- IL Foss
- IL Framsyn
- Furuflaten IL
- Gibostad IF
- Gluntan FK
- Gryllefjord IL
- Hamna IL
- Havørn/Senjahopen IL
- Husøy IL
- Indre Kåfjord IL
- Ishavsbyen FK
- Kattfjord SK
- Krokelvdalen IL
- Kvaløya SK
- Kvæsma FK
- Laksvatn IL
- Lavangen IF
- Lyngen/Karnes IL
- Lyngstuva SK
- Manndalen UIL
- Målselv IL
- Mårfjell IL
- Mellembygd IL
- Nordkjosbotn IL
- Nordpolen FK (futsal)
- Nordreisa IL
- Oksfjord og Straumfjord IL
- Olderdalen IK
- Øverbygd IL
- Øvre Salangen IL
- IL Pioner Fotball
- Ramfjord UIL
- Reinen IL
- Ringvassøy IL
- Rotsundelv IL
- Røyken UIL
- Salangen IF
- FK Senja
- Sjarmtrollan IL
- IF Skarp
- Skarven IL
- Skibotn IL
- Skjervøy IK
- Skøelv IGL
- Skognes og Omegn IL
- Søndre Torsken IL
- Sør-Kvaløya IL
- Sørreisa IL
- Sør-Tranøy IL
- Stakkevollan IF
- Storelva AIL
- Storfjord IL
- Storsteinnes IL
- Svalbard TIL
- Tranøy BK
- Tromsdalen UIL
- Tromsø IL
- Tromsøstudentenes IL
- FK Tromsøysund
- IL Ulfstind
- Ullsfjord SK
- Unglyn IL
- Vallhall FK
- Varden FK
- Vårsol IL

== League competitions ==
Troms Fotballkrets run the following league competitions:

=== Men's football ===
4. divisjon - one section
5. divisjon - one section
6. divisjon - three sections

=== Women's football ===
2. divisjon - two sections (section 8 with Hålogaland Fotballkrets and section 9 with Finnmark Fotballkrets)
3. divisjon - one section
