= Oscar Kindlund =

Swedish professional football-player (born 1997)

Personal information
- Full name: Oscar George Kindlund
- Date of birth: 11 January 1997 (age 29)
- Place of birth: Sweden
- Height: 1.80 m (5 ft 11 in)
- Position: Midfielder

Team information
- Current team: Nybergsund IL-Trysil (on loan from IK Sirius)

Youth career
- –2013: IK Sirius
- 2013–2015: IFK Göteborg

Senior career*
Years	Team	Apps	(Gls)
2012–2013	IK Sirius	2	(0)
2015–2016	IFK Göteborg	0	(0)
2016	→ IK Sirius (loan)	3	(0)
2016–	IK Sirius	20	(0)
2018–	→ Nybergsund IL-Trysil (loan)	0	(0)

International career^{‡}
2012–2014	Sweden U-17	15	(0)
2014	Sweden U-19	3	(0)
- * Club domestic league appearances and goals as of 31 August 2018 ‡ National team caps and goals as of 17 April 2018

Oscar George Kindlund (born January 11, 1997) is a Swedish professional footballer who plays as a midfielder for Nybergsund IL-Trysil, on loan from IK Sirius.

His father, Björn Kindlund, is a former professional football player who has played for AIK.

== Career ==
Kindlund's mother club is IK Sirius. He debuted for the first-team on 15 June 2012 against Akropolis IF.

In summer 2013, Kindlund went to IFK Göteborg. In 2015 he signed a professional contract and won the U19-Allsvenskan with the club. In June 2016 Kindlund was loaned to IK Sirius. He debuted in the Superettan on June 11, 2016 against GAIS (0–0). On August 5, 2016, IK Sirius announced that Oscar Kindlund had signed a three-year contract with the club.
