= Sunnmøre Fotballkrets =

District organisation of the Norwegian Football Federation

- Purpose: District Football Association
- Headquarters: Ålesund
- Location(s): Sjømannsvegen 16 6008 Ålesund Norway
- Chairman: Lena Charlotte Pedersen
- Website: https://www.fotball.no/kretser/sunnmore/

The Sunnmøre Fotballkrets (Sunnmøre Football Association) is one of the 18 district organisations of the Norwegian Football Federation. It administers lower tier football in the traditional district of Sunnmøre.

== Background ==
Sunnmøre Fotballkrets is the governing body for football in the traditional district of Sunnmøre, which is a part of Møre og Romsdal county. The Association currently has 66 member clubs. Based in Ålesund, the Association's chairman is Lena Charlotte Pedersen.

== Affiliated Members ==
The following 66 clubs are affiliated to the Sunnmøre Fotballkrets:

- Aafk Fortuna
- Aalesunds FK
- Åheim IL
- Aksla IL
- Ålesund Døves AK
- Åmdal IL
- Bergsøy IL
- Blindheim IL
- Brandal IL
- Brattvåg IL
- Dalsfjorden FK
- Ellingsøy IL
- Emblem IL
- Fiskerstrand IL
- Fjørtoft TIL
- Flø IL
- Folkestad IL
- Giske IL
- Gjerdsvika IL
- Godøy IL
- SK Guard
- Gursken IL
- Gurskøy IL
- Haddal IL
- Haramsøy/Nordøy FK
- Hareid IL
- Harøy IL
- Hasundgot IL
- SK Herd
- Hjørungavåg IL
- IL Hødd
- Hovdebygda IL
- Hundeidvik IL
- Kvamsøy IL
- Langevåg IL
- Larsnes IL
- Larsnes/Gursken FK
- Lepsøy IL
- Moltustranda IL
- Mork IL
- MSIL
- IL Norborg
- Norddal/Eidsdal/Geiranger FK
- Ørskog IL
- Ørsta IL
- IL Ravn
- SK Rollon
- Sæbø IL
- Sandsøy IL
- SIF/Hessa IL
- Skodje IL
- Spjelkavik IL
- Stordal IL
- Stranda IL
- Sunnylven IL
- FK Sykkylven
- Sykkylven IL
- Tjørvåg IL
- IL Valder
- Valldal IL
- Vanylven FK
- Vartdal TIL
- Velledalen og Ringen FL
- Vigra IL
- Volda Student IL
- Volda TI

== League competitions ==
Sunnmøre Fotballkrets run the following league competitions:

=== Men's football ===
4. divisjon - one section
5. divisjon - one section
6. divisjon - three sections

=== Women's football ===
2. divisjon - one section (section 5 with Trøndelag Fotballkrets)
3. divisjon - one section
