= SK Djerv 1919 =

Norwegian football club

- Full name: Sportsklubben Djerv 1919
- Founded: 26 March 1919; 107 years ago
- Ground: Djervbanen, Haugesund
- League: 3. divisjon
- 2024: 3. divisjon, group 1, 5th of 14
- Website: https://djerv1919.no
Home colours	Away colours

SK Djerv 1919 (full name, Sportsklubben Djerv 1919) is a 4th tier 3. divisjon of Norwegian football (promoted from the 4. divisjon in 2018) football club established in 1919 based in Haugesund, Norway.

== History ==
The club was founded on 26 March 1919. The 1919 was added to the club name to distinguish it from the SK Djerv club from Bergen. Djerv 1919 contested to the 1986 Norwegian Cup semi-finals where they were eliminated by a knockout by Tromsø 1–0. The only season team played in the top division was 1988 1. divisjon. In 1993, its elite teams were merged with Haugar to create FK Haugesund, but kept on playing in the lower leagues. In 2018, the team was promoted to the 4th tier of Norwegian football.

=== Recent seasons ===
Season		Pos.	Pl.	W	D	L	GS	GA	P	Cup	Notes	Ref.
2013	4. divisjon	3	22	13	2	7	86	34	41	First qualifying round		
2014	4. divisjon	2	22	19	1	2	86	27	58	Second qualifying round		
2015	4. divisjon	4	22	12	6	4	71	37	42	First qualifying round		
2016	4. divisjon	2	22	13	5	4	53	27	44	dnq		
2017	4. divisjon	8	26	9	7	10	60	46	34	First qualifying round		
2018	4. divisjon	↑ 1	26	19	6	1	92	37	63	dnq	Promoted to 3. divisjon	
2019	3. divisjon	3	26	16	3	7	72	38	51	First qualifying round		
2020	Season cancelled											
2021	3. divisjon	4	13	6	4	3	25	18	22	First round		
2022	3. divisjon	10	26	9	6	11	56	52	33	First round		
2023	3. divisjon	4	26	15	6	5	71	43	51	First round		
