= Nordmøre og Romsdal Fotballkrets =

Norwegian Football Federation

- Purpose: District Football Association
- Headquarters: Molde
- Location(s): Julsundvegen 14 6412 Molde Møre og Romsdal Norway
- Chairman: Evy Austad
- Website: https://www.fotball.no/kretser/nordmore-og-romsdal/

The Nordmøre og Romsdal Fotballkrets (English: Nordmøre and Romsdal Football Association) is one of the 18 district organisations of the Norwegian Football Federation. It administers lower tier football in the traditional districts of Nordmøre and Romsdal.

== Background ==
Nordmøre og Romsdal Fotballkrets, is the governing body for football in the traditional districts of Nordmøre and Romsdal, which today is a part of the county Møre og Romsdal. The Association currently has 59 member clubs. Based in Molde Municipality, the Association's Chairman is Evy Austad.

== Affiliated members ==
The following 59 clubs are affiliated to the Nordmøre og Romsdal Fotballkrets:

- Åndalsnes IF
- Aure IL
- IL Averøykameratene
- Bæverfjord IL
- Batnfjord IL
- Bjørset FK
- Bøfjord IL
- Bolsøya IL
- IL Braatt
- IL Bryn
- Bud IL
- Clausenengen FK
- Dahle IL
- Eide og Omegn FK
- Eidsøra IL
- Eidsvåg IL
- Ekko/Aureosen IL
- Elnesvågen og Omegn IL
- Eresfjord og Vistdal FK
- Ertvågsøya IL
- Fiksdal/Rekdal BK
- Frei FK
- IL Goma
- Gossen IL
- IL Grykameratene
- Halsa IL
- Hjelset-Kleive Fotball
- Innfjorden IL
- Isfjorden IL
- Kristiansund BK
- Kristiansund FK
- Kvass/Ulvungen FK
- Kårvåg/Havørn Fotball
- Langfjorden FK
- Malmefjorden IL
- Meek IL
- Midsund IL
- Molde FK
- Molde Studentenes IL
- Måndalen IL
- IL Nordlandet
- Øksendal IL
- Øvre Surnadal IL
- Reinsfjell FK
- SK Rival
- IL Samhald
- Skåla IL
- Smøla IL
- IL Søya
- Straumsnes IL
- Sunndal IL Fotball
- Surnadal IL
- Tingvoll IL
- Todalen IL
- Tomrefjord IL
- SK Træff
- Valsøyfjord IL
- Vestnes Varfjell IL
- Vågstranda IL

== League competitions ==
Nordmøre og Romsdal Fotballkrets run the following league competitions:

=== Men's football ===
4. divisjon - one section
5. divisjon - one section
6. divisjon - three sections

=== Women's football ===
3. divisjon - one section
