= Hålogaland Fotballkrets =

District organisation of the Norwegian Football Federation

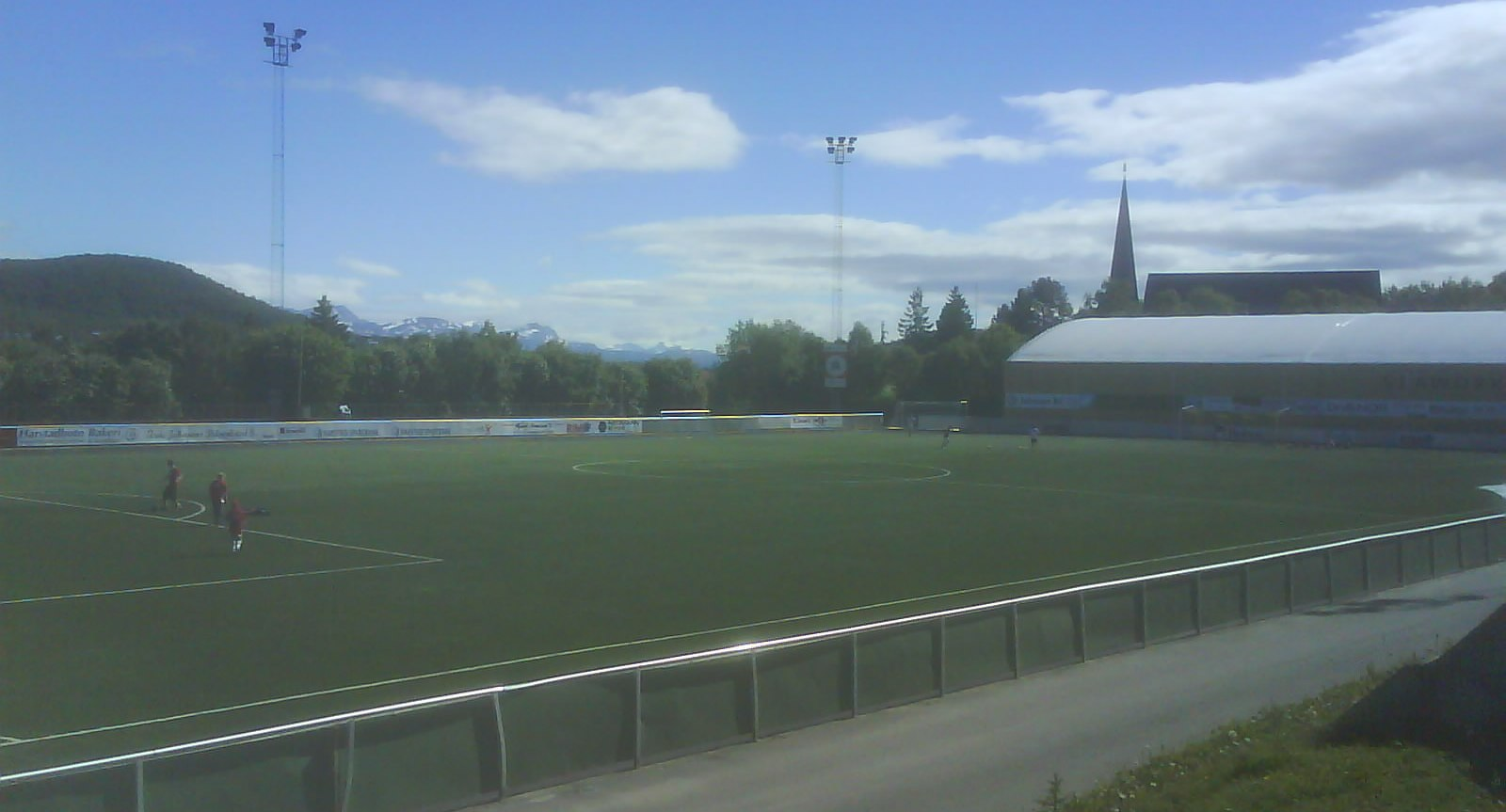
- Harstad stadion
- Purpose: District Football Association
- Headquarters: Harstad
- Location(s): Åsveien 6 9405 Harstad Norway
- Chairman: Frank Johnsen
- Website: https://www.fotball.no/kretser/haalogaland/

The Hålogaland Fotballkrets (Hålogaland Football Association) is one of the 18 district organisations of the Norwegian Football Federation. It administers lower tier football in the traditional district of Sør-Troms, Ofoten, Lofoten and most of Vesterålen.

== Background ==
Hålogaland Fotballkrets, is the governing body for football in the traditional district of Hålogaland, which covers parts of counties Nordland and Troms. The Association currently has 61 member clubs. Based in Harstad, the Association's chairman is Frank Johnsen.

== Affiliated Members ==
The following 61 clubs are affiliated to the Hålogaland Fotballkrets:

- Ajaks SFK
- Alsvåg IL
- Andenes IL
- IL Andøygutten
- Ballangen FK
- Ballstad UIL
- Beisfjord IL
- Bjerkvik IF
- IL Blest
- FK Brage Trondenes
- Fjelldal IL
- Flakstad IL
- FK Landsås
- Gratangen IL
- UIL Gravdal
- Grovfjord IL
- Grytøy IL
- Håkvik IL
- SK Hardhaus
- Harstad Damefotball
- Harstad IL
- Henningsvær IL
- Hinnøya Futsal (futsal)
- Høken SK
- IL Holmgang
- Ibestad IL
- IF KIL-Kameratene
- Kabelvåg IL
- IL King
- Kjøpsnes IL
- Knausen FK
- Kvæfjord IL
- Laukvik IL
- Laupstad IL
- Leknes FK
- Liland IF
- Lødingen IL
- FK Lofoten
- Lokomotiv Lofoten FK (futsal)
- FK Luna
- Medkila IL
- Melbo IL
- FK Mjølner
- IL Morild
- Narvik/Fagernes IL
- Nord/Sprint IL
- Reine IL
- Sandtorg UIL
- IL Santor
- Sjøbrott U&IL
- Skånland OIF
- Skjomen IL
- Sortland IL
- Sørvikmark IL
- Stålbrott IL
- Stamsund IL
- Stokmarknes IL
- Strauman IL
- Svolvær IL
- FK Varg
- Vesterålen Futsal (futsal)

== League competitions ==
Hålogaland Fotballkrets run the following league competitions:

=== Men's football ===
4. divisjon - one section
5. divisjon - four sections

=== Women's football ===
2. divisjon - one section
