= Robert Kling (footballer) =

Norwegian footballer (born 1997)

Personal information
- Full name: Robert Kling
- Date of birth: 1 May 1997 (age 29)
- Place of birth: Haugesund, Norway
- Height: 1.80 m (5 ft 11 in)
- Position: Midfielder

Team information
- Current team: Kopervik IL

Youth career
- Kopervik Il: Haugesund

Senior career*
Years	Team	Apps	(Gls)
2015–2017	Haugesund	7	(0)
2018	Florø	5	(0)
2019–2024	Vard Haugesund	106	(16)
2024–	Kopervik IL	9	(1)
- * Club domestic league appearances and goals as of 1 January 2025

Robert Kling (born 1 May 1997) is a Norwegian footballer who plays for SK Vard Haugesund.
