= FK Bergen Nord =

Norwegian sports club

- Full name: Fotballklubben Bergen Nord
- Founded: 1988
- Ground: Salhus kunstgress
- Manager: Mathias Macody Lund
- League: 5. Divisjon
- 2016: 4. Divisjon, 11th (relegated)
Home colours

Fotballklubben Bergen Nord is a Norwegian association football club from Salhus, Åsane, Hordaland.

It was established in 1988 when the football section split from IL Norna-Salhus and Hordvik IL.

The men's football team was relegated from the Third Division, the fourth tier of Norwegian football, after the 2012 season.
