= Nybergsund IL-Trysil =

Norwegian football club

Nybergsund
- Full name: Nybergsund IL-Trysil
- Founded: 17 March 1918; 108 years ago
- Ground: Nybergsund Stadion
- Capacity: 1,500
- Head coach: Milivoj Knezevic
- League: 4. divisjon
- 2024: 4. divisjon Indre Østland, 6th of 14
| Home colours | Away colours |

Nybergsund IL-Trysil is a Norwegian football club located in Nybergsund in Trysil Municipality. It currently plays in the 4. divisjon, the fifth tier of the Norwegian football league system.

== History ==
In 2007, Nybergsund were promoted to the second tier of Norwegian football. The same year they knocked Eliteserien clubs Fredrikstad and Vålerenga out of the cup, before eventually losing to Haugesund in the quarterfinal. In 2011, Nybergsund were relegated after four seasons in the second tier.

== Recent seasons ==
| Season | | Pos. | Pl. | W | D | L | GS | GA | P | Cup | Notes |
|---|---|---|---|---|---|---|---|---|---|---|---|
| 2001 | 2. divisjon | 6 | 26 | 12 | 3 | 11 | 43 | 37 | 39 | Third round | |
| 2002 | 2. divisjon | 4 | 26 | 12 | 4 | 10 | 41 | 47 | 40 | Third round | |
| 2003 | 2. divisjon | 3 | 26 | 16 | 7 | 3 | 74 | 30 | 55 | Second round | |
| 2004 | 2. divisjon | 6 | 26 | 10 | 9 | 7 | 43 | 35 | 39 | Second round | |
| 2005 | 2. divisjon | 3 | 26 | 16 | 5 | 5 | 57 | 26 | 53 | Third round | |
| 2006 | 2. divisjon | 3 | 26 | 15 | 8 | 3 | 63 | 30 | 53 | First round | |
| 2007 | 2. divisjon | ↑ 1 | 26 | 20 | 3 | 3 | 75 | 24 | 63 | Quarterfinal | Promoted to the 1. divisjon |
| 2008 | 1. divisjon | 8 | 30 | 12 | 6 | 12 | 49 | 53 | 42 | Second round | |
| 2009 | 1. divisjon | 9 | 30 | 11 | 7 | 12 | 49 | 54 | 40 | Second round | |
| 2010 | 1. divisjon | 11 | 28 | 9 | 8 | 11 | 38 | 47 | 35 | Third round | |
| 2011 | 1. divisjon | ↓ 14 | 30 | 6 | 5 | 19 | 41 | 72 | 23 | Second round | Relegated to the 2. divisjon |
| 2012 | 2. divisjon | 3 | 26 | 13 | 5 | 8 | 49 | 32 | 44 | Second round | |
| 2013 | 2. divisjon | 6 | 26 | 11 | 7 | 8 | 50 | 56 | 40 | Second round | |
| 2014 | 2. divisjon | 5 | 26 | 11 | 8 | 7 | 47 | 35 | 41 | Second round | |
| 2015 | 2. divisjon | 8 | 26 | 9 | 9 | 8 | 50 | 49 | 36 | First round | |
| 2016 | 2. divisjon | 5 | 26 | 11 | 7 | 8 | 52 | 45 | 40 | First round | |
| 2017 | 2. divisjon | 10 | 26 | 9 | 4 | 13 | 40 | 46 | 31 | Second round | |
| 2018 | 2. divisjon | ↓ 12 | 26 | 5 | 6 | 15 | 26 | 58 | 21 | First round | Relegated to the 3. divisjon |
| 2019 | 3. divisjon | 5 | 26 | 13 | 3 | 10 | 49 | 36 | 42 | First round | |
| 2020 | Season cancelled | | | | | | | | | | |
| 2021 | 3. divisjon | ↓ 12 | 13 | 2 | 5 | 6 | 11 | 23 | 11 | First round | Relegated to the 4. divisjon |
| 2022 | 4. divisjon | 3 | 26 | 15 | 5 | 6 | 63 | 30 | 50 | First qualifying round | |
| 2023 | 4. divisjon | 7 | 26 | 11 | 3 | 12 | 48 | 52 | 36 | First round | |
| 2024 | 4. divisjon | 6 | 26 | 13 | 7 | 6 | 69 | 40 | 46 | First round | |
