= Finnmark Fotballkrets =

District organisation of the Norwegian Football Federation

- Purpose: District Football Association
- Headquarters: Alta
- Location(s): Skoleveien 6 9510 Alta Norway
- Chairman: Torkjell Johnsen
- Website: https://www.fotball.no/kretser/finnmark/

The Finnmark Fotballkrets (Finnmark Football Association) is one of the 18 district organisations of the Norwegian Football Federation. It administers lower tier football in Finnmark county.

== Background ==
Finnmark Fotballkrets, is the governing body for football in Finnmark county. The Association currently has 38 member clubs. Based in Alta, the Association's chairman is Torkjell Johnsen.

== Affiliated Members ==
The following clubs are affiliated to the Finnmark Fotballkrets:

- Alta IF
- AVJU
- Båtsfjord SK
- Berlevåg FK
- Billefjord IL
- Bjørnevatn IL
- Bølgen IL
- Bossekop UL
- Havøysund IL
- Hesseng IL
- HIF/Stein
- Honningsvåg T&IF
- IL Frea
- Indrefjord IL
- Kaiskuru IL
- Kautokeino IL
- Kirkenes IF
- Kvalsund IL
- Masi IL
- Nerskogen IL
- Neverfjord IL
- Norild IL
- Nordkinn FK
- Nordlys IL
- Øksfjord IL
- IL Pasvik Hauk
- IL Polarstjernen
- Porsanger IL
- Rafsbotn IL
- Sandnes IL
- Sirma IL
- Sørild BK
- FK Sørøy Glimt
- Talvik IL
- Tana BK
- Tverrelvdalen IL
- Varanger BK
- Vardø IL

== League competitions ==
Finnmark Fotballkrets run the following league competitions:

=== Men's football ===
4. divisjon - one section
5. divisjon - three sections

=== Women's football ===
2. divisjon - one section (with Troms Fotballkrets)
