= Nordland Fotballkrets =

Norwegian football organisation

- Purpose: District Football Association
- Headquarters: Bodø
- Location(s): Sjøgata 25 Aspmyra Stadion 8006 Bodø Norway
- Chairman: Ernst Pedersen
- Website: https://www.fotball.no/kretser/nordland/

The Nordland Fotballkrets (Nordland Football Association) is one of the 18 district organisations of the Norwegian Football Federation. It administers lower tier football in the traditional district of Helgeland and Salten.

== Background ==
Nordland Fotballkrets, is the governing body for football in the traditional district of Helgeland and Salten, which covers the southern and mid parts of Nordland county. The Association currently has 98 member clubs. Based in Bodø, the Association's chairman is Ernst Pedersen.

== Affiliated Members ==
The following 98 clubs are affiliated to the Nordland Fotballkrets:

- Åga IL
- Aldersund IL
- Alstahaug IL
- Bjerka IL
- Bleikvassli IL
- FK Bodø/Glimt
- Bodø Internasjonale IK
- Bodø Studentenes IL
- Bossmo & Ytteren IL
- Bro IL
- Brønnøysund IL
- Dalselv IL
- Dønna IL
- IL Drag
- Drevja IL
- Drevvatn IL
- FK Fauske/Sprint
- Finneid IL
- Finneidfjord IL
- FK Gevir Bodø
- Glomfjord IL
- IK Grand Bodø
- Grane IL
- Grønnåsen IL
- Gruben IL
- IL Halsakameratene
- Halsøy IL
- Hamarøy IL
- Hattfjelldal IL
- Hemnes IL
- Herøy IL
- FK Herøy/Dønna
- Hilstad IL
- Hulløy Bodø
- Hunstad FK
- Innstranda IL
- IK Junkeren
- Kongsvik IL
- Korgen IL
- Kråkegull SK
- Kvarven UIL
- Leirfjord IL
- Lovund UIL
- Lurøy FK
- IL Malm
- Meløy FK
- Meløy UIL
- Misvær IL
- Mo IL
- Mørkved SK
- Mosjøen IL
- Nedre Beiarn IL
- Nedre Rønvik IL
- Nesna IL
- Neverdal UIL
- Nordfjorden IL
- Nordstranda IL
- Olderskog IL
- Ørnes IL
- Radaasen FK
- Rana FK
- Reipå IL
- Rødøy UIL
- Røst IL
- FK Saltdalskameratene
- Saltstraumen IL
- Sandnessjøen IL
- Selfors UL
- FK Silkefot
- Skjerstad IL
- Skonseng UL
- SMIL Engavågen
- Solværøyan UIL
- Sømna IL
- Sørfold FK
- IL Splint
- Sport-71 IK
- Sport Torghatten IL
- IL Stålkameratene
- Steigen SK
- Storforshei IF
- Storjord Futsal (futsal)
- Storm Bodø FK
- IL Strandkameratene
- Svartisen Futsal (futsal)
- IL Tjalg
- Tjongsfjord IL
- Træna UIL
- Tverlandet IL
- Utskarpen IL
- Valnesfjord IL
- Værangfjord IL
- Værøy IL
- IL Vega
- Vegakameratene
- Vevelstad IL
- Vinger IL
- FK Vinkelen

== League competitions ==
Nordland Fotballkrets run the following league competitions:

=== Men's football ===
4. divisjon - one section
5. divisjon - one section
6. divisjon - two sections

=== Women's football ===
2. divisjon - one section
