= Sivert Engh Øverby =

Norwegian footballer (born 1999)

Personal information
- Date of birth: 10 June 1999 (age 27)
- Place of birth: Hønefoss, Norway
- Height: 1.79 m (5 ft 10 in)
- Position: Left-back

Team information
- Current team: Kalmar FF
- Number: 3

Youth career
- –2016: Hønefoss

Senior career*
Years	Team	Apps	(Gls)
2016–2018	Hønefoss	25	(0)
2018–2021	Fana	28	(1)
2021–2024	Mjøndalen	87	(3)
2025–	Kalmar FF	25	(2)
- * Club domestic league appearances and goals as of 23 May 2026

Sivert Engh Øverby (born 10 June 1999) is a Norwegian footballer who plays as a left-back for Superettan side Kalmar FF.

== Career ==
Øverby started his career with Hønefoss, where he made his senior debut in August 2016. In the summer of 2018, he moved to Fana. In the 2020 season, the Norwegian Third Division was cancelled due to the COVID-19 pandemic, and Øverby did not play any games. On 12 May 2021, he signed for Mjøndalen. Four days later, he made his Eliteserien debut in a 3–0 win against Sandefjord.
