= Norwegian Fourth Division =

- Founded: 1991; 35 years ago 1963–1990 (as 5. divisjon)
- Country: Norway
- Confederation: UEFA
- Number of clubs: 278 (22 groups from 18 districts)
- Level on pyramid: 5
- Promotion to: Norwegian Third Division
- Relegation to: Norwegian Fifth Division
- Domestic cup: Norwegian Cup
- Website: fotball.no
- Current: 2026 Norwegian Fourth Division

The Norwegian Fourth Division, or 4. divisjon (Norwegian), is the fifth highest division of the men's football league in Norway. Like the rest of the Norwegian football league system, the season runs from spring to autumn, running approximately from April to October.

In 2019, it was decided that not all 24 group winners would be promoted to 3. divisjon. A play-off system was established and the number of teams promoting from 4. divisjon was reduced to 18. Since the 2017 season, 4. divisjon teams have been eligible to qualify for the Norwegian Cup. Ahead of the 2020 season, the number of groups were reduced to 22.

Like in the rest of the Norwegian football league system, all the teams play each other twice, once at home and once away. Three points are awarded for a win, one for a draw, and if two teams are equal on points, the one with the best goal difference is above the other on the table. The teams are placed in the 24 sections according to geographic considerations.

The District Football Associations are responsible for the administration of 4. divisjon. The Norwegian Football Federation is responsible for the administration of 3. divisjon and the higher tiers of the Norwegian football league system.

== History ==
=== 1963–2010 ===
The 4. divisjon was known as the 5. divisjon from 1963 until 1990, when the top-tier league changed its name to Tippeligaen, the 2. divisjon became the 1. divisjon and the names of all the lower divisions were adjusted accordingly.

=== 2012–2016 ===
From 2012 to 2016, 4. divisjon consisted of 26 parallel sections of 10 to 15 teams, and a total of 34 teams promoted from 4. divisjon.

=== 2017– ===
After changes in the Norwegian football pyramid, no teams were promoted from the 4. divisjon after the 2016 season. The fifth tier was split into twenty-four groups.

With fewer teams in the above tiers of the football pyramid, 4. divisjon teams routinely participate in the Norwegian Football Cup.

In 2020, the number of groups was reduced to 22.

== Reserve teams ==
Reserve teams of clubs from higher divisions can participate in the 4. divisjon. Reserve teams of clubs from the 3. divisjon can not be promoted from the 4. divisjon.

== Winners ==
=== 2017– ===
Teams in italics lost promotion play-offs and were not promoted.

==== Group 1–12 ====
Season	Group 1	Group 2	Group 3	Group 4	Group 5	Group 6	Group 7	Group 8	Group 9	Group 10	Group 11	Group 12
2017	Selbak	Gjelleråsen	Grei	Rilindja	KFUM Oslo 2	Løten	Ottestad	Åssiden	Sandefjord 2	Urædd	Donn	Egersund 2
2018	Sarpsborg 08 2	Ull/Kisa 2	Årvoll	Nordstrand	Rommen	Raufoss 2	Kongsvinger 2	Mjøndalen 2	Flint	Storm	Mandalskameratene	Bryne 2
2019	Fredrikstad 2	Funnefoss/Vormsund	Nesodden	Grorud 2	Skeid 2	Toten	Trysil	Åssiden	Sandefjord 2	Urædd	Express	Hinna
2021	Sprint-Jeløy	Grei	Kjelsås 2	Skjetten	Lillehammer	Engerdal	Vestfossen	Sandefjord 2	Urædd	Søgne	Randesund	Sandnes Ulf 2
2022	Råde	KFUM 2	Ullern 2	Skedsmo	Ham-Kam 2	Åskollen	Sandefjord 2	Hei	Donn	Eiger	Madla	Loddefjord
2023	Råde	Aurskog-Høland	Ready	Gamle Oslo	Kongsvinger 2	Åssiden	Flint	Hei	Vigør	Sola	FK Haugesund 2	Askøy
2024	Drøbak-Frogn	Lyn 2	Grei	Ull/Kisa 2	Lillehammer	Vestfossen	Åsgårdstrand	Pors 2	Våg	Hinna	Torvastad	Gneist
2025	Råde	Heming	Union Carl Berner	Rælingen	Brumunddal	Konnerud	Teie	Hei	Mandalskameratene	Varhaug	Åkra	Varegg
2026	Fredrikstad 2	Christiania	Kolbotn	Eidsvold IF	HamKam 2	Åssiden	Flint	Urædd	Flekkefjord	Rosseland	Nord	Frøya

==== Group 13–24 ====
Season	Group 13	Group 14	Group 15	Group 16	Group 17	Group 18	Group 19	Group 20	Group 21	Group 22	Group 23	Group 24
2017	Vardeneset	Tertnes	Øystese	Sogndal 2	Hødd 2	Kristiansund 2	Levanger 2	Melhus	Stålkameratene	Melbo	Skarp	Bjørnevatn
2018	Djerv 1919	Os	Bergen Nord	Fjøra	Aalesund 2	Sunndal	Ranheim 2	Strindheim	Bodø/Glimt 2	Leknes	Tromsø 2	Norild
2019	Åkra	Bjarg	Sandviken	Årdal	Volda	Kristiansund 2	NTNUI	Tynset	Rana	Skånland	Fløya 2	Tverrelvdalen
2021	Haugesund 2	Bremnes	Bergen Nord	Lyngbø	Frøya	Førde	Hødd 2	Tomrefjord	Levanger 2	Steinkjer	Trygg/Lade	Kvik
2022	Gneist	Sogndal 2	Herd	Kristiansund 2	Verdal	Trønder-Lyn	Mosjøen	Skånland	Hamna	HIF/Stein	-	-
2023	Åsane 2	Årdal	Herd	Træff 2^{1}	Trygg/Lade	Melhus	Innstranda	Harstad	Ulfstind	Kirkenes	-	-
2024	Lyngbø	Fjøra	Volda	Åndalsnes	Kvik	Ranheim 2	Fauske/Sprint	Sortland	Tromsø 2	Alta 2	-	-
2025	Austevoll	Sogndal 2	Stordal/Ørskog^{2}	Træff 2	NTNUI	Orkla	Fauske/Sprint	Mjølner	Finnsnes	Bossekop	-	-
2026	Bergensdalen	Fjøra	Stordal/Ørskog	Kristiansund 2	Nationalkameratene	Tynset	Stålkameratene	Sortland	Skarp	Bjørnevatn	-	-

- ^{1} Træff 2 were not eligible for promotion, runners-up Surnadal promoted.
- ^{2} Stordal/Ørskog were not eligible for promotion, runners-up Herd promoted.

==== Group 25–28 ====
Season	Group 25	Group 26	Group 27	Group 28
2021	Innstranda	Harstad	Krokelvdalen	Bossekop
2022	-	-	-	-
2023	-	-	-	-
2024	-	-	-	-
2025	-	-	-	-
2026	-	-	-	-

== Administration ==
The District Football Associations are responsible for the administration of 4. divisjon. The Norwegian Football Federation is responsible for the administration of 3. divisjon and the higher tiers of the Norwegian football league system.

The current 22 groups are administered by the following districts:

- Agder Fotballkrets (one section)
- Akershus Fotballkrets (one section)
- Buskerud Fotballkrets (one section)
- Finnmark Fotballkrets (one section)
- Hålogaland Fotballkrets (one section)
- Hordaland Fotballkrets (two sections)
- Indre Østland Fotballkrets (one section)
- Nordland Fotballkrets (one section)
- Nordmøre og Romsdal Fotballkrets (one section)
- Oslo Fotballkrets (two sections)
- Østfold Fotballkrets (one section)
- Rogaland Fotballkrets (two sections)
- Sogn og Fjordane Fotballkrets (one section)
- Sunnmøre Fotballkrets (one section)
- Telemark Fotballkrets (one section)
- Troms Fotballkrets (one section)
- Trøndelag Fotballkrets (two sections)
- Vestfold Fotballkrets (one section)

== Current teams ==
Agder

- Donn
- Express
- Flekkefjord
- Giv Akt
- Jerv B
- Lyngdal
- Oyestad
- Randesund
- Sogne
- Start B
- Tigerberget
- Trauma
- Vigor
- Vindbjart B

Akershus

- Aurskog Finstadbru
- Eidsvold
- Eidsvold Turn B
- Fet
- Fjellhamar
- Fu/Vo
- Gjellerasen
- Hauerseter
- Leirsund
- Lorenskog B
- Raumnes & Arnes
- Sorumsand
- Strommen B
- Ull/Kisa B

Buskerud

- Askollen
- Assiden
- Birkebeineren
- Drammens
- Graabein
- Hallingdal
- Hokksund
- Honefoss B
- Jevnaker
- Lier
- Mjondalen B
- Modum
- Stoppen
- Vestfossen

Finnmark

- Alta B
- Bjornevatn
- Hammerfest
- Indrefjord
- Kirkenes
- Nordkinn
- Nordlys
- Norild
- Porsanger
- Talvik
- Tverrelvdalen

Hordaland Group 1

- Arna Bjornar
- BI Athletics
- Bjarg B
- Fana B
- Flaktveit
- Froya
- Loddefjord
- Mathopen
- Olsvik
- Osteroy
- Sandvikens B
- Trott

Hordaland Group 2

- Baune
- Bergensdalen
- Djerv
- Lyngbo
- Nest Sotra
- NHHI
- Nordhordland
- Nymark
- Odda
- Os B
- Sotra B
- Sund

Hålogaland

- Harstad B
- Landsas
- Medkila
- Melbo
- Mjolner
- Morild
- Skanland
- Sortland
- Stokmarknes
- Svolvaer

Indre Østland

- Flisa
- Follebu Gausdal
- Gjovik/Lyn B
- HamKam B
- Kolbukameratene
- Lillehammer B
- Loten
- Nybergsund
- Odal
- Raufoss B
- Reinsvoll
- Ridabu
- Skreia
- Toten
- Trysil

Nordland

- Bodo Glimt B
- Bossmo & Ytteren
- Bronnoysund
- Grand Bodo
- Innstranda
- Junkeren B
- Mosjoen
- Rana B
- Sandnessjoen
- Stalkameratene
- Tverlandet

Nordmøre og Romsdal

- Andalsnes
- Averoykameratene
- Dahle
- Eide/Omegn
- Elnesvagen
- FCK
- Kristiansund B
- Midsund
- Smola/Aure
- Sunndal
- Surnadal
- Traeff B

Oslo Group I

- Arvoll
- Asker B
- Baerum B
- Christiania
- Gruner
- Gui
- Haslum
- Holmlia
- Lokomotiv Oslo B
- Lommedalen
- Nordstrand B
- Skeid B

Oslo Group II

- Follo B
- Grorud B
- Kjelsas B
- Kolbotn
- Korsvoll
- Lambertseter
- Manglerud Star
- Nesodden
- Oppsal B
- Ready B
- Stovner
- Ullern B

Rogaland Group I

- Algard
- Bryne B
- Egersunds B
- Eiger
- Forus og Gausel
- Froyland
- Midtbygden
- Randaberg
- Rosseland
- Sola
- Vardeneset
- Vidar B

Rogaland Group II

- Avaldsnes
- Ganddal
- Hana
- Haugar
- Hundvag
- Kopervik
- Nord
- Riska
- Sandnes Ulf B
- Torvastad
- Vard Haugesund B
- Vedavag Karmoy

Sogn og Fjordane

- Ardal
- Dale
- Eid
- Fjora
- Floro
- Forde B
- Hoyang
- Jolster
- Kaupanger
- Maloy
- Sandane
- Stryn

Sunnmøre

- Bergsoy
- Brattvag B
- Hareid
- Hodd B
- Hovdebygda
- Langevag
- Orsta
- Ravn
- Rollon
- Spjelkavik B
- Stordal/Orskog
- Valder

Telemark

- Brevik
- Eidanger
- Hei
- Langangen
- Notodden B
- Odd C
- Pors B
- Skidar
- Snogg
- Storm
- Tollnes
- Uraedd

Troms

- Floya B
- Hamna
- Krokelvdalen
- Kvaloya
- Mellembygd
- Nordreisa
- Salangen
- Senja
- Skarp
- Stakkevollan
- Storsteinnes
- Tromsdalen B

Trøndelag Group 1

- Egge
- Freidig
- Levanger B
- Malvik/Hommelvik
- Nationalkameratene
- Rorvik
- Steinkjer
- Strindheim B
- Sverresborg
- Tiller
- Verdal
- Vuku

Trøndelag Group 2

- Heimdal
- Hitra
- Kolstad
- Lade
- Lanke
- Nardo B
- Orkanger
- Rennebu
- Rindal
- Stjordals Blink B
- Tronder Lyn
- Tynset

Vestfold

- Asgardstrand
- Barkaker
- Eik Tonsberg B
- Flint
- Larvik Turn
- Orn Horten B
- Runar
- Sandar
- Sandefjord BK
- Store Bergan
- Teie
- Tonsberg

Østfold

- As
- Borgen
- Drobak/Frogn B
- Ekholt
- Fredrikstad B
- Idd
- Krakeroy
- Moss B
- Ostsiden
- Rakkestad
- Sarpsborg
- Selbak
- Sparta Sarpsborg
- Sprint Jeloy
