= SK Træff =

Norwegian sports club

- Full name: Sportsklubben Træff
- Founded: 1 October 1924; 102 years ago
- Ground: Reknesbanen, Molde Municipality
- Head coach: Magnus Oltedal
- League: 2. divisjon
- 2024: 3. divisjon group 5, 1st of 14 (promoted)
Home colours	Away colours

Sportsklubben Træff is a Norwegian sports club from Molde Municipality in Møre og Romsdal. It currently has sections for association football and team handball.

The men's football team currently plays in the Norwegian Second Division, the third tier of the Norwegian football league system, after being promoted from the 2024 Norwegian Third Division.

== History ==
Træff had a longer stint in the 2. divisjon before being relegated after the 2002 season. Also, in 2000 they had survived play-offs with 3. divisjon teams to avoid relegation. Once situated in the 3. divisjon, Træff became a top team. In 2003 they won their 3. divisjon group, but in the two-leg playoff they lost to Volda TI on penalties after 3–3 on aggregate. In 2004 they won again and beat Skarbøvik IF 4–2 on aggregate in the playoff, but was relegated after the 2005 2. divisjon. In further playoffs, Træff lost to Skarbøvik in 2007 and to Aalesund 2 in 2009. In 2011, Træff was promoted to the 2. divisjon after they won their group. In 2015, the club was again relegated to the 3. divisjon.

== Recent history ==
Season		Pos.	Pl.	W	D	L	GS	GA	P	Cup	Notes
2009	3. divisjon	2	22	16	3	3	92	25	51	First round	
2010	3. divisjon	2	22	15	4	3	74	19	49	First round	
2011	3. divisjon	↑ 1	26	17	2	7	86	28	53	Second round	Promoted
2012	2. divisjon	9	26	8	8	10	51	50	32	Second round	
2013	2. divisjon	4	26	13	3	10	45	46	42	Second round	
2014	2. divisjon	10	26	7	7	12	36	43	28	Second round	
2015	2. divisjon	↓ 13	26	5	5	16	27	63	20	Second round	Relegated
2016	3. divisjon	3	26	16	2	8	53	33	50	Second qual. round	
2017	3. divisjon	9	26	10	6	10	45	48	36	First round	
2018	3. divisjon	2	26	15	8	3	65	37	53	First round	
2019	3. divisjon	10	26	8	5	13	33	47	29	First round	
2020	Season cancelled										
2021	3. divisjon	↑ 1	13	10	1	2	41	20	31	First round	Promoted
2022	2. divisjon	6	26	10	6	10	49	44	36	First round	

== Current squad ==
As of 3 September 2026

Note: Flags indicate national team as defined under FIFA eligibility rules; some limited exceptions apply. Players may hold more than one non-FIFA nationality.

No.	Pos.	Nation	Player
1	GK	NOR	James Oliver Knudsen
2	DF	NOR	Sindre Heggstad
5	DF	NOR	Iver Flønes
6	DF	NOR	Vegard Forren
7	FW	NOR	Kjetil Tøsse
8	FW	NOR	Sivert Gussiås
9	FW	BIH	Dino Okanović
10	FW	NOR	Ruben Slutås Toven
11	FW	NOR	Magnus Fjørtoft Løvik (on loan from Molde)
12	GK	NOR	Petter Eichler Jensen
13	DF	POL	Alex Bugaj
14	MF	NOR	Filip Heggdal Kristoffersen
16	MF	NOR	Emil Silseth

No.	Pos.	Nation	Player
18	MF	THA	Wachirawut Phudithip
19	MF	NOR	Linus Juberg-Hovland
20	FW	NOR	Per Ole Tveraas
21	MF	NOR	Mathias Mørk (on loan from Molde)
22	GK	NOR	Sivert Beinset
23	MF	NOR	Henrik Bøe
25	MF	NOR	Herman Opsahl (on loan from Kristiansund)
27	DF	NOR	Jørgen Bøe (on loan from Aalesund)
28	DF	NOR	Sondre Eide Blikås
29	DF	NOR	Sander Finnøy
88	FW	SSD	Agwa Okuot Obiech
—	DF	NOR	Isak Dahlseng
—	MF	NOR	Mathias Enge Railo
