= Finnsnes IL =

Norwegian sports club

Finnsnes Idrettslag
- Founded: 29 January 1922; 104 years ago
- Ground: Finnsnes stadion
- Capacity: 500
- Chairman: Ivar Holand
- Manager: Jonathan Barlow
- League: 4. divisjon
- 2021: 3. divisjon Group 6, 14th of 14 (relegated)
Home colours	Away colours

Finnsnes Idrettslag is a sports club in Finnsnes, Norway. It is most known for its association football, which once played in the Norwegian Second Division, the third tier of Norwegian football. It plays in the Norwegian Fourth Division. It has a rival team «FK Senja» because they are on opposite sides of the bridge between Finnsnes and Silsand. In 2024 they got knocked out by Storelva in the NM Cup in the first round. They got knocked 5–3 on penalties.

== History ==
Season		Pos.	Pl.	W	D	L	GS	GA	P	Cup	Notes
2011	3. divisjon	↑1	22	18	1	3	86	21	55	First round	Promoted
2012	2. divisjon	↓ 13	26	8	3	15	35	51	27	First round	Relegated
2013	3. divisjon	↑1	22	21	1	0	92	11	64	Second qualifying round	Promoted
2014	2. divisjon	6	26	14	1	11	45	41	43	Second round	
2015	2. divisjon	4	26	15	4	7	53	45	49	Second round	
2016	2. divisjon	2	26	16	8	2	52	22	56	Second round	
2017	2. divisjon	↓ 12	26	6	4	16	26	45	22	Second round	Relegated
2018	3. divisjon	8	26	8	10	8	41	34	34	First round	
2019	3. divisjon	2	26	16	6	4	67	29	54	Second qualifying round	
2020	Season cancelled										
2021	3. divisjon	↓ 14	13	2	0	11	17	36	6	First round	Relegated
2022	4. divisjon	3	26	16	1	5	88	49	49	First round	
