= Hinna Fotball =

Norwegian football team

Hinna
- Full name: Hinna Fotball
- Founded: 13 November 1917 (Hinna IL)
- Ground: Wintershallbanen; Hinna
- League: 3. divisjon
- 2024: 4. divisjon / Rogaland 1, 1st of 12 (promoted)
Home colours

Hinna Fotball is the association football section of the Norwegian sports club Hinna IL from Stavanger.

The men's football team currently plays in the 3. divisjon, the fourth tier of the Norwegian football league system. The team was newly promoted in 2016, and before that had a stint in the 3. divisjon from 2009 to 2012.
