= Årdal FK =

Norwegian football club

- Full name: Årdal Fotballklubb
- Founded: 9 October 2003
- Ground: Jotun stadion, Øvre Årdal
- Coach: Morten Brandsdal
- League: 4. divisjon
- 2024: 3. divisjon group 1, 13th of 14 (relegated)
Home colours	Away colours

Årdal Fotballklubb is a Norwegian football club from Øvre Årdal in Årdal Municipality, Vestland county, Norway. The club was founded on 9 October 2003 as a merger between the football branches of IL Jotun and Årdalstangen IL on senior level. The club was known as Jotun Årdalstangen FK until late 2005.

As of 2020, the men's team currently plays in the 3. divisjon, the 4th tier of the Norwegian football league system, having last played in the 2. divisjon in 2006.

The women's team plays in the lower divisions.

== History ==
=== Results, men's team ===
Season		Pos.	Pl.	W	D	L	GS	GA	P	Cup	Notes
2004	2. Division, section 2	9	26	9	6	11	45	49	33	1st round	
2005	2. divisjon, section 3	7	26	10	4	12	34	44	34	1st round	
2006	2. divisjon, section 1	14	26	5	3	18	38	69	18	2nd round	Relegated to 3. Division
2007	3. divisjon, section Sogn og Fjordane	1	22	17	2	3	85	36	53	2nd qualifying round	lost playoffs for promotion
2008	3. divisjon, section Sogn og Fjordane	2	22	11	7	4	61	31	40	1st qualifying round	
2009	3. divisjon, section Sogn og Fjordane	3	22	15	0	5	63	34	45	1st qualifying round	
2010	3. divisjon, section Sogn og Fjordane	4	22	13	3	6	61	41	42	1st round	
2011	3. divisjon, section 8	4	26	13	5	8	44	37	44	1st qualifying round	
2012	3. divisjon, section 8	6	26	13	3	10	57	47	42	2nd qualifying round	
2013	3. divisjon, section 8	9								2nd qualifying round	
2014	3. divisjon, section 8	19									
2015	3. divisjon, section 8	8									
2016	3. divisjon, section 8	8									
2017	4. divisjon, section										
2018	4. divisjon, section										
2019	4. divisjon, section										
2020	4. divisjon, section										
2021	4. divisjon, section										
2022	4. divisjon, section										
2023	4. divisjon, section										
2024	3. divisjon, section	13									
