= FK Toten =

Norwegian football club

- Full name: Fotballklubben Toten
- Founded: 17 December 1995 (30 years ago)
- Ground: Østre Toten kunstgressbane, Lena
- Head coach: Geir Grønstad
- League: 4. divisjon
- 2024: 4. divisjon, group IØ, 8th of 14
- Website: http://www.fktoten.no/
Home colours	Away colours

Fotballklubben Toten is a Norwegian association football club located in Østre Toten Municipality in Innlandet county. The club was founded 17 December 1995 as a cooperation club between several clus from Østre Toten. The men's team currently plays in 4. divisjon, the fifth tier of the Norwegian football league system.

== History ==
FK Toten was founded 17 December 1995 as a cooperation club between Kapp IF, Lena IF og Skreia IL. Kapp IF later withdrew from the club.

7 December 2015 was a new cooperation project launched which Lena IF, Skreia IL, Kapp IF and Lensbygda SK committed to. The same agreement concluded with Kolbu IL, IL Kolbukameratene and Kolbu/KK Fotball joined as supporting clubs. In a press statement dated 21 October 2016, Skreia IL announced their withdrawal from FK Toten. The club won the 2019 4. divisjon and won promotion to 3. divisjon.

=== Recent seasons ===
Season		Pos.	Pl.	W	D	L	GS	GA	P	Cup	Notes
2019	4. divisjon	↑ 1	22	19	3	0	108	18	60	First round	Promoted to 3. divisjon
