= IL Express =

Norwegian sports club

Express
- Full name: Idrettslaget Express
- Founded: 1 May 1919; 107 years ago
- Ground: Fevik stadion Fevik
- League: 4. divisjon
Home colours

Idrettslaget Express is a Norwegian sports club from Fevik in Grimstad Municipality, Agder county. It has sections for association football, team handball, basketball, floorball, athletics, orienteering and gymnastics.

It was founded on 1 May 1919. The club colors are red and white.

The men's football team currently plays in the 4. divisjon, the fifth tier of the Norwegian football league system.
