= Volda TI =

Norwegian sports club

- Full name: Volda Turn- og Idrottslag
- Founded: 1899 (football 1916)
- Ground: Volda Stadion
- League: 3. divisjon
- 2024: 4. divisjon / Sunnmøre, 1st of 12 (promoted)
Home colours

Volda TI (Volda Turn- og Idrottslag) is a sports club in Volda in Møre og Romsdal county, Norway. It currently has sections for association football and "general sports".

The club was founded as Voldens TF in 1899 as a gymnastics club. Other sports were added later, including association football in 1916. The name was changed to the Volda TI in 1945. In 1998, the club was organized as an alliance sports team, which had two overarching legal entities: Football and general sports (Allidrett). It currently has sections for association football, alpine skiing, Nordic skiing, swimming, Frisbee-golf and children's athletics.

The handball branch of the club in 2007 split from the Alliance and formed the Volda Handball club.

As of 2021, the men's football team will play in the 3rd division, the fourth tier of the Norwegian football league system; the squad had been promoted to compete in the 2020 3. divisjon season, but the season was cancelled due to the COVID-19 pandemic in Norway. The club had a long stint in the 2. divisjon before being relegated after the 1999 season. They briefly returned to the 2. division for the 2004 season, after winning promotion in the 2003 3. division playoffs but were relegated to 3. division for the 2005 season.
