= Madla IL =

Norwegian football club

- Full name: Madla Idrettslag
- Founded: 9 March 1939
- Ground: Madla Handelslag stadion, Stavanger
- League: Third Division
- 2026: 1st (promoted)

Madla Idrettslag is a Norwegian association football club from Hafrsfjord, Stavanger.

The club was founded on 9 March 1939. It was originally a multi-sports club, but every sport except for football became diminished.

The men's football team plays in the Third Division, the fourth tier of Norwegian football. During the 1990s and 2000s, the club mostly played below the fourth tier, with exceptions in 1992, 1998, 2004 and 2012. Every time, the club was relegated straight away. However, the team later managed a significantly longer spell between 2015 and 2021, winning their group in the 2022 Norwegian Division and returning to the Third Division from 2023. The team winning their group in the 2026 Third Division and promotion to the Second Division since 2027.

The women's football team plays in the Fourth Division.

Madla IL is also known as the club where Erik Thorstvedt, Norway international goalkeeper and Premier League player, started his career.
