= Melbo IL =

Norwegian football club

- Full name: Melbo Idrettslag
- Founded: 15 February 1915
- Ground: Havfisk stadion, Melbu
- League: Fourth Division
- 2024: 2nd

Melbo Idrettslag is a Norwegian multi-sports club from Melbu, Hadsel. The club has sections for association football and Nordic skiing.

The club was founded on 15 February 1915 as a skiing club. The club later added football and athletics. The first medal in a Norwegian championship was won by Olaf Olsen, who finished behind Kaare Strøm and Eugen Haugland in the triple jump in 1938, followed by Brynjulf Oshaug who took silver medals in the pentathlon in 1952 and 1953. The team colours are dark blue and white.

The men's football team currently plays in the Fourth Division, the fifth tier of football in Norway.

The team enjoyed spells in the Third Division from 2000 to 2003, 2009 to 2010, and 2015 to 2021. The team reached the first round of the Norwegian Cup in 2018, losing 1–4 to Bodø/Glimt; the second round in 2019, losing 1–2 to Tromsø; the first round in 2021, losing 0–2 to Harstad; and 2025, losing 0–1 to Sortland.

The women's football team currently plays in the Third Division.
