= Norwegian football league system =

Series of interconnected leagues

The Norwegian football league system, or pyramid, is a series of interconnected leagues for club football in Norway.

== 2017 system in men's football ==
As of 2017, the current national league system administered by the NFF is organised as 1–1–2–6, where Eliteserien is the highest level and the First Division the second tier, followed by two groups in the third tier (Second Division) and 6 regional groups in the fourth tier (Third Division). The leagues in the fifth tier (Fourth Division) and below are regional divisions administered by the various regional football associations. The regional leagues mostly follow county borders.

Level	League(s)/Division(s)					
1	Eliteserien; 16 clubs					
2	First Division/OBOS-ligaen; 16 clubs					
3	Second Division; Group 1; 14 clubs			Second Division; Group 2; 14 clubs		
4	Third Division/ Norsk Tipping-ligaen; Group 1; 14 clubs	Third Division/ Norsk Tipping-ligaen; Group 2; 14 clubs	Third Division/ Norsk Tipping-ligaen; Group 3; 14 clubs	Third Division/ Norsk Tipping-ligaen; Group 4; 14 clubs	Third Division/ Norsk Tipping-ligaen; Group 5; 14 clubs	Third Division/ Norsk Tipping-ligaen; Group 6; 14 clubs
5–11	The Fourth Division through the Tenth Division are regional divisions administered by the various regional football associations.					

=== Promotion and relegation ===
Division	Promotion	Relegation
Eliteserien	N/A	15th, 16th (14th team in play-off)
First Division/OBOS-ligaen	Winner, runner-up (3rd, 4th, 5th, 6th in play-off)	15th, 16th (14th team in play-off)
Second Division	Winners in two groups (Runners-up in play-off)	12th, 13th, 14th in two groups
Third Division/Norsk Tipping-ligaen	Winners in six groups	12th, 13th, 14th in six groups

== 2021 system in women's football ==
As of 2021, the league system for the top two divisions in Norwegian women's football is organised like this:

Level	League(s)/Division(s)
1	Toppserien; 10 clubs 12 clubs (from 2026 onwards)
2	First Division; 10 clubs
3–6	The Second Division through the Fifth Division are regional divisions administered by the various regional football associations.

=== Promotion and relegation ===
Division	Promotion	Relegation
Toppserien	N/A	10th (9th team in play-off)
First Division	Winner (2nd team in play-off)	9th, 10th
