= 2025 Norwegian Fourth Division =

4. divisjon
- Season: 2025
- Promoted: 18 teams

The 2025 season of the 4. divisjon, the fifth highest association football league for men in Norway.

Districts with group winners earning automatic promotion to 3. divisjon:

- Agder
- Akershus
- Hordaland 1
- Hordaland 2
- Indre Østland
- Oslo 1
- Oslo 2
- Rogaland 1
- Rogaland 2
- Sogn og Fjordane
- Trøndelag 1
- Trøndelag

District with group winners entering qualifiers to earn promotion to 3. divisjon:

- Vestfold vs Østfold
- Buskerud vs Telemark
- Nordmøre og Romsdal vs Sunnmøre
- Finnmark, Hålogaland, Nordland and Troms battle for three promotion spots
  - Finnmark vs Troms, Hålogaland vs Nordland. Winners are promoted
  - Losing teams in previous matchups face each other on neutral ground, where the winner earns promotion

== Teams ==
Østfold

1. Råde − won playoff
2. Kråkerøy
3. Sprint-Jeløy
4. Moss 2
5. Ekholt
6. Sparta Sarpsborg
7. Ås
8. Sarpsborg
9. Selbak
10. Idd
11. Østsiden
12. Borgen
13. Lisleby - relegated

- Askim – pulled team

Oslo 1

1. Heming – promoted
2. Christiania
3. Kjelsås 2
4. Grüner
5. Korsvoll
6. Skeid 2
7. Ullern 2
8. Årvoll
9. Bærum 2
10. Lambertseter
11. Asker 2
12. Fagerborg - relegated

Oslo 2

1. Union Carl Berner – promoted
2. Kolbotn
3. Holmlia
4. Follo 2
5. Lokomotiv Oslo 2
6. Grorud 2
7. Haslum
8. Manglerud Star
9. Oppsal 2
10. Nordstrand 2
11. Stovner
12. Bøler - relegated

Akershus

1. Rælingen – promoted
2. Eidsvold IF
3. Raumnes & Årnes
4. Hauerseter
5. Gjelleråsen
6. Lørenskog 2
7. Eidsvold Turn 2
8. Fjellhamar
9. Aurskog-Finstadbru
10. Sørumsand
11. Strømmen 2
12. Kløfta - relegated
13. Løvenstad - relegated
14. Gjerdrum - relegated

Indre Østland

1. Brumunddal – promoted
2. Skreia
3. Nybergsund
4. Kolbu KK
5. Ridabu
6. Flisa
7. Trysil
8. Raufoss 2
9. Gjøvik-Lyn 2
10. Reinsvoll
11. Løten – withdrew post-season
12. Toten
13. Follebu
14. Ottestad - relegated

Buskerud

1. Konnerud − won playoff
2. Drammens BK
3. Modum
4. Hallingdal
5. Vestfossen
6. Mjøndalen 2
7. Birkebeineren
8. Stoppen
9. Åssiden 2 – relegated
10. Graabein
11. Jevnaker
12. Åskollen
13. Hokksund
14. Eiker/Kvikk - relegated

Vestfold

1. Teie − lost playoff
2. Larvik Turn
3. Runar
4. Åsgårdstrand
5. Ørn-Horten 2
6. Eik Tønsberg 2
7. Sandar
8. Flint 2 - relegated
9. Sandefjord BK
10. Store Bergan
11. Re - relegated
12. Nøtterøy - relegated

Telemark

1. Hei − lost playoff
2. Langangen
3. Eidanger
4. Odd 3
5. Urædd
6. Storm
7. Tollnes
8. Notodden 2
9. Brevik
10. Gulset - relegated
11. Skarphedin - relegated
12. Stathelle/Langesund - relegated

Agder

1. Mandalskameratene – promoted
2. Donn
3. Flekkefjord
4. Vigør
5. Søgne
6. Start 2
7. Jerv 2
8. Øyestad
9. Express
10. Randesund
11. Vindbjart 2
12. Trauma - relegated
13. Giv Akt - relegated

- Hisøy/Arendal 2 – pulled team

Rogaland 1

1. Varhaug – promoted
2. Rosseland
3. Frøyland
4. Hana
5. Bryne 2
6. Ålgård
7. Eiger
8. Riska
9. Ganddal
10. Klepp - relegated
11. Sandved - relegated
12. Stavanger - relegated

Rogaland 2

1. Åkra – promoted
2. Vardeneset
3. Nord
4. Forus og Gausel
5. Vidar 2
6. Haugar
7. Kopervik
8. Randaberg
9. Avaldsnes
10. Vard Haugesund 2
11. Havørn - relegated
12. Vaulen - relegated

Hordaland 1

1. Varegg – promoted
2. Nordhordland
3. Frøya
4. Djerv
5. Nest-Sotra
6. Flaktveit
7. Sund
8. Mathopen
9. Sotra 2
10. Kvernbit - relegated
11. Askøy 2 - relegated

- Voss – pulled team

Hordaland 2

1. Austevoll – promoted
2. Arna-Bjørnar
3. NHHI
4. Fana 2
5. Bergensdalen
6. Trott
7. Os 2
8. BI Athletics
9. Nymark
10. Osterøy
11. Smørås - relegated
12. Bremnes - relegated

Sogn og Fjordane

1. Sogndal 2 – promoted
2. Høyang
3. Årdal
4. Florø
5. Stryn
6. Eid
7. Jølster
8. Førde 2
9. Kaupanger
10. Sandane
11. Dale
12. Bremanger - relegated

Sunnmøre

1. Stordal/Ørskog
2. Herd − won playoff
3. Rollon
4. Hareid
5. Hødd 2
6. Bergsøy
7. Spjelkavik 2
8. Ravn
9. Langevåg
10. Hovdebygda
11. Ørsta
12. SIF/Hessa - relegated

Nordmøre og Romsdal

1. Træff 2 − lost playoff
2. Midsund
3. Elnesvågen og Omegn
4. Averøykameratene
5. Sunndal
6. Åndalsnes
7. Dahle
8. Eide og Omegn
9. Clausenengen
10. Malmefjorden - relegated
11. Vestnes Varfjell - relegated

- Frei – pulled team

Trøndelag 1

1. NTNUI − promoted
2. Steinkjer
3. Lånke
4. Vuku
5. Rørvik
6. Stjørdals-Blink 2
7. Malvik/Hommelvik
8. Levanger 2
9. Kolstad
10. Verdal
11. Heimdal
12. Charlottenlund - relegated

Trøndelag 2

1. Orkla − promoted
2. Tynset
3. Lade
4. Trønder-Lyn
5. Nationalkameratene
6. Rindal
7. Sverresborg
8. Hitra
9. Nardo 2
10. Strindheim 2
11. KIL/Hemne - relegated
12. Tiller 2 - relegated

Nordland

1. Fauske/Sprint − won playoff
2. Bodø/Glimt 2
3. Innstranda
4. Mosjøen
5. Rana 2
6. Stålkameratene
7. Bossmo & Ytteren – withdrew post-season
8. Junkeren 2
9. Sandnessjøen
10. Brønnøysund

- Grand Bodø – pulled team, but stayed

Hålogaland

1. Mjølner − lost playoff
2. Melbo
3. Skånland
4. Landsås
5. Harstad 2
6. Svolvær
7. Sortland 2 – relegated

- Leknes – pulled team
- Lofoten – pulled team
- Medkila – pulled team, but stayed

Troms

1. Finnsnes − won playoff
2. Krokelvdalen
3. Tromsdalen 2
4. Skarp
5. Hamna
6. Senja
7. Mellembygd
8. Salangen
9. Fløya 2
10. Kvaløya
11. Nordreisa
12. Lyngen/Karnes - relegated

Finnmark

1. Bossekop − won playoff
2. Tverrelvdalen
3. Bjørnevatn
4. Norild
5. HIF/Stein
6. Porsanger
7. Kirkenes
8. Indrefjord – withdrew post-season
9. Nordlys

== Playoffs ==
- Råde beat Teie 7–0 on aggregate.
- Konnerud beat Hei 4–1 on aggregate.
- Herd beat Træff 2 on walkover.
- Fauske/Sprint beat Mjølner 4–3 on aggregate.
- Finnsnes beat Bossekop 5–1 on aggregate.
- Bossekop beat Mjølner 3–2.
