= 2005 Norwegian Third Division =

Norwegian football league season

The 2005 season of the 3. divisjon, the fourth highest association football league for men in Norway.

Between 20 and 22 games (depending on group size) were played in 24 groups, with 3 points given for wins and 1 for draws. Twelve teams were promoted to the 2. divisjon through playoff.

== Tables ==
Group 1

1. Fredrikstad 2 – lost playoff
2. Sparta Sarpsborg 2
3. Østsiden
4. Fagerborg
5. Lisleby
6. Skeid 2
7. Kolbotn
8. Årvoll
9. Greåker
10. Grorud
11. Rakkestad – relegated
12. Borgar – relegated

Group 2

1. Korsvoll – won playoff
2. Moss 2
3. Trøgstad/Båstad
4. Råde
5. Grei
6. Sprint-Jeløy 2
7. Gresvik
8. St. Hanshaugen
9. Selbak
10. Rygge
11. Kvik Halden 2 – relegated
12. Grüner – relegated

Group 3

1. Vålerenga 2 – won playoff
2. Follo 2
3. KFUM
4. Ullern
5. Skjetten
6. Blaker
7. Klemetsrud
8. Bærum 2
9. Øvrevoll/Hosle
10. Fet
11. Frogner – relegated
12. Sørumsand – relegated

Group 4

1. Asker – lost playoff
2. Strømmen
3. Lyn 2
4. Bjørkelangen
5. Fjellhamar
6. Fossum
7. Røa
8. Kjelsås 2
9. Høland
10. Hauger
11. Rælingen – relegated
- Mercantile 2 – pulled team

Group 5

1. Elverum – lost playoff
2. Kongsvinger 2
3. Sander
4. Bjerke
5. Trysil
6. Eidsvold
7. Stange
8. Galterud
9. Ottestad
10. Funnefoss/Vormsund
11. Flisa
12. Grue – relegated

Group 6

1. Ham-Kam 2 – won playoff
2. Ringsaker
3. Hamar
4. Ringebu/Fåvang
5. Lom
6. Fart
7. Vardal
8. Vang – relegated
9. SAFK Fagernes
10. Redalen
11. Fron – relegated
12. Vind – relegated

Group 7

1. Åmot – won playoff
2. Kolbu/KK
3. Vestli
4. Raufoss 2
5. Jevnaker
6. Andes
7. Toten
8. Hønefoss BK 2
9. Hadeland
10. Hønefoss SK – relegated
11. Ihle
12. Nittedal – relegated

Group 8

1. Stabæk 2 – won playoff
2. Mjøndalen
3. Birkebeineren
4. Åskollen
5. Konnerud
6. Kongsberg
7. Bygdø Monolitten
8. Solberg
9. Åssiden
10. Strømsgodset 2
11. ROS – relegated
12. Drafn – relegated

Group 9

1. Eik-Tønsberg – lost playoff
2. Flint
3. Runar
4. Borre
5. Larvik Turn
6. Sandar
7. Holmestrand
8. Ivrig
9. Tjølling
10. Sem
11. Stokke – relegated
- Larvik Fotball 2 – pulled team

Group 10

1. Pors Grenland 2
2. Skarphedin – lost playoff
3. Langesund/Stathelle
4. Herkules
5. FK Arendal
6. Skotfoss
7. Urædd
8. Odd Grenland 3
9. Tollnes 2 – relegated
10. Brevik
11. Kjapp – relegated
- Fyresdal – pulled team

Group 11

1. Start 2 – won playoff
2. Jerv
3. Lyngdal
4. Vindbjart
5. Vigør
6. Søgne
7. Mandalskameratene 2
8. Tveit
9. Donn
10. Grane
11. Våg
12. Sørfjell – relegated

Group 12

1. Randaberg – lost playoff
2. Stavanger
3. Sandnes Ulf 2
4. Staal Jørpeland
5. Vidar
6. Buøy
7. Vaulen
8. Havørn
9. Bjerkreim
10. Varhaug
11. Hundvåg – relegated
12. Eiger – relegated

Group 13

1. Bryne 2
2. Kopervik – won playoff
3. Haugesund 2
4. Vardeneset
5. Åkra
6. Skjold
7. Nord
8. Frøyland
9. Avaldsnes
10. Vedavåg Karmøy
11. Sola – relegated
12. Figgjo – relegated

Group 14

1. Askøy – won playoff
2. Nest-Sotra
3. Follese
4. Os
5. Vadmyra
6. Trio
7. Stord/Moster 2
8. Solid
9. Øygard
10. Trott – relegated
11. Bremnes – relegated
12. Halsnøy – relegated

Group 15

1. Voss – lost playoff
2. Radøy/Manger
3. Arna-Bjørnar
4. Norheimsund
5. Hald
6. Frøya
7. Gneist
8. Austevoll
9. Lyngbø
10. Sandviken
11. Varegg – relegated
12. Nymark – relegated

Group 16

1. Stryn – lost playoff
2. Sogndal 2
3. Førde
4. Fjøra
5. Tornado Måløy
6. Høyang
7. Skavøypoll
8. Kaupanger
9. Sandane
10. Dale
11. Jotun 2 – relegated
12. Florø – relegated

Group 17

1. Aalesund 2
2. Volda – lost playoff
3. Spjelkavik
4. Hareid
5. Skarbøvik
6. Sykkylven
7. Langevåg
8. Valder
9. Ørsta
10. Bergsøy
11. Blindheim/Emblem – relegated
12. Stranda – relegated

Group 18

1. Kristiansund – won playoff
2. Averøykameratene
3. Sunndal
4. Surnadal
5. Gossen
6. Dahle
7. Elnesvågen/Omegn
8. Midsund
9. Eide og Omegn
10. Bryn
11. Bud – relegated
12. Åndalsnes – relegated

Group 19

1. KIL/Hemne – won playoff
2. Tynset
3. Orkla
4. Rosenborg 3
5. Flå
6. NTNUI
7. Strindheim 2
8. Stjørdals-Blink
9. Fram
10. Buvik
11. Melhus – relegated
12. Sverresborg – relegated

Group 20

1. Nardo – lost playoff
2. Rørvik
3. Nidelv
4. Namsos
5. Levanger 2
6. Rissa
7. Verdal
8. Bjørgan
9. Selbu
10. Kvik
11. Malvik
12. Kolstad 2 – relegated

Group 21

1. Steigen – won playoff
2. Bodø/Glimt 2
3. Mosjøen
4. Stålkameratene
5. Fauske/Sprint
6. Junkeren
7. Brønnøysund
8. Meløy
9. Mo 2
10. Herøy/Dønna
11. Saltdalkameratene – relegated

Group 22

1. Mjølner – lost playoff
2. Vesterålen (->Sortland)
3. Grovfjord
4. Skånland
5. Medkila
6. Morild
7. Andenes
8. Ballangen
9. Leknes
10. Hadsel – relegated
11. Ballstad – relegated
12. Beisfjord – relegated

Group 23

1. Tromsø 2 – lost playoff
2. Salangen
3. Senja
4. Ishavsbyen
5. Skjervøy
6. Tromsdalen 2
7. Fløya
8. Bardu
9. Nordreisa
10. Ramfjord – relegated
11. Kvaløysletta – relegated
12. Storsteinnes – relegated

Group 24

1. Hammerfest – won playoff
2. Bossekop
3. Kirkenes
4. Alta 2
5. Kautokeino
6. Båtsfjord
7. Porsanger
8. Norild
9. Sørøy/Glimt
10. Tverrelvdalen
11. Nordlys
12. Honningsvåg – relegated
