= 2023 Norwegian Fourth Division =

4. divisjon
- Season: 2023
- Promoted: 18 teams

The 2023 season of the 4. divisjon, the fifth highest association football league for men in Norway.

Finnmark reverted from their regular/playoff format used last season, but instead Nordland adopted the format. The 7 teams from Nordland played a round-robin tournament, followed by the top 4 facing each other in playoffs and the bottom 3 doing the same, retaining all points from the regular season. The playoffs were similar to championship rounds and relegation rounds from other leagues, but were named playoff (sluttspill) and placement (plasseringsspill), respectively.

== Teams ==
Østfold

1. Råde – lost playoff
2. Drøbak-Frogn
3. Kråkerøy
4. Ås
5. Askim
6. Sarpsborg
7. Moss 2
8. Sparta Sarpsborg
9. Østsiden
10. Sprint-Jeløy 2
11. Borgen
12. Lisleby
13. Kvik Halden 2 – relegated
14. Tistedalen – relegated

Oslo 1

1. Ready – promoted
2. Christiania
3. Heming
4. Lyn 2
5. Kjelsås 2
6. Union Carl Berner
7. Grüner
8. Bærum 2
9. Lommedalen
10. Asker 2
11. Fagerborg – relegated
12. Holmen – relegated

Oslo 2

1. Gamle Oslo – promoted
2. Grei
3. Holmlia
4. Årvoll
5. Manglerud Star
6. Stovner
7. Follo 2
8. Lokomotiv Oslo 2
9. Oppsal 2
10. Oslojuvelene
11. Kolbotn – relegated
12. Oldenborg – relegated

Akershus

1. Aurskog-Høland – promoted
2. Ull/Kisa 2
3. Rælingen
4. Eidsvold
5. Sørumsand
6. Fjellhamar
7. Løvenstad
8. Lørenskog 2
9. Hauerseter
10. Raumnes & Årnes
11. Eidsvold Turn 2
12. Kløfta
13. Strømmen 2
14. Gjelleråsen 2 – relegated

Indre Østland

1. Kongsvinger 2 - promoted
2. Lillehammer
3. Kolbukameratene
4. Gjøvik-Lyn 2
5. Gran
6. Ottestad
7. Nybergsund
8. Faaberg
9. Toten
10. Brumunddal 2 - relegated
11. Valdres
12. Flisa
13. Løten - relegated
14. Furnes - relegated

Buskerud

1. Åssiden – won playoff
2. Hallingdal
3. Konnerud
4. Vestfossen
5. Drammens BK
6. Modum
7. Jevnaker
8. Eiker/Kvikk
9. Svelvik
10. Stoppen
11. Kongsberg
12. Sande
13. Hokksund
14. ROS – relegated

Vestfold

1. Flint – won playoff
2. Åsgårdstrand
3. Sandefjord BK
4. Teie
5. Eik Tønsberg 2
6. Stag/Fram 2
7. Ørn-Horten 2
8. Nøtterøy
9. Re
10. Runar
11. Husøy & Foynland – relegated

- Stokke – pulled team

Telemark

1. Hei – lost playoff
2. Pors 2
3. Storm
4. Urædd
5. Eidanger
6. Skarphedin
7. Stathelle/Langesund
8. Odd 3
9. Notodden 2
10. Tollnes
11. Skiens Grane – relegated
12. Kragerø – relegated

Agder

1. Vigør - promoted
2. Express
3. Jerv 2
4. Trauma
5. Søgne
6. Våg
7. Lyngdal
8. Froland
9. Vindbjart 2
10. Giv Akt
11. Flekkefjord
12. Torridal – relegated
13. Hisøy – relegated
14. Fløy 2 – relegated

Rogaland 1

1. Sola - promoted
2. Rosseland
3. Varhaug
4. Vardeneset
5. Vidar 2
6. Frøyland
7. Bryne 2
8. Egersund 2
9. Stavanger
10. Randaberg
11. Midtbygden – relegated
12. Klepp – relegated
13. Brusand – relegated
14. Hundvåg – relegated

Rogaland 2

1. Haugesund 2 − promoted
2. Åkra
3. Forus og Gausel
4. Nord
5. Torvastad
6. Vard Haugesund 2
7. Sandved
8. Ålgård
9. Hana
10. Hinna
11. Kopervik
12. Riska – relegated
13. Skjold – relegated
14. Djerv 1919 2 – relegated

Hordaland 1

1. Askøy − promoted
2. Arna-Bjørnar
3. Voss
4. Osterøy
5. Nordhordland
6. Odda
7. Trio
8. NHHI
9. Sund
10. Radøy – relegated
11. Sotra 2 – relegated
12. Øystese/Norheimsund – relegated

Hordaland 2

1. Åsane 2 − promoted
2. Lyngbø
3. Varegg
4. Austevoll
5. Nymark
6. Fana 2
7. Tertnes
8. Djerv
9. Flaktveit
10. Smørås
11. Trott/Solid/Stord 2 – relegated
12. Sædalen – relegated

Sogn og Fjordane

1. Årdal − promoted
2. Fjøra
3. Eid
4. Stryn
5. Høyang
6. Måløy
7. Førde 2
8. Sandane
9. Studentspretten
10. Jølster
11. Vik
12. Bremanger – relegated

Sunnmøre

1. Herd – lost playoff
2. Ørsta
3. Bergsøy
4. Rollon
5. SIF/Hessa
6. Hovdebygda
7. Hareid
8. Aksla
9. Volda 2 – relegated
10. Langevåg
11. Blindheim – relegated
12. Norborg/Brattvåg 2 – relegated

Nordmøre og Romsdal

1. Træff 2
2. Surnadal – won playoff
3. Tomrefjord
4. Dahle
5. Eide og Omegn
6. Åndalsnes
7. Sunndal
8. Elnesvågen og Omegn
9. Midsund
10. Vestnes Varfjell
11. Malmefjorden
12. Hjelset-Kleive – relegated

Trøndelag 1

1. Trygg/Lade − promoted
2. Ranheim 2
3. Vuku
4. Rørvik
5. Levanger 2
6. Flatanger
7. Stjørdals-Blink 2
8. Nidelv
9. Heimdal
10. Lånke
11. Namsos – relegated
12. Charlottenlund – relegated

Trøndelag 2

1. Melhus − promoted
2. Tynset
3. NTNUI
4. Kvik
5. Sverresborg
6. Strindheim 2
7. Alvdal
8. KIL/Hemne
9. Hitra
10. Nardo 2 – relegated
11. Ørland – relegated
12. Orkla 2 – relegated

Nordland

1. Innstranda
2. Fauske/Sprint
3. Grand Bodø
4. Sandnessjøen
5. Hulløy Bodø
6. Rana 2
7. Bossmo & Ytteren

Nordland playoff

1. Innstranda − won playoff
2. Fauske/Sprint
3. Sandnessjøen
4. Grand Bodø

Nordland placement

1. Hulløy Bodø
2. Rana 2
3. Bossmo & Ytteren

Hålogaland

1. Harstad − won playoff
2. Melbo
3. Medkila
4. Morild
5. Lofoten
6. Sortland
7. Landsås
8. Andenes – withdrew after season
9. Leknes/Ballstad
10. Stokmarknes

Troms

1. Ulfstind − won playoff
2. Finnsnes
3. Hamna
4. Storelva
5. Skarp
6. Senja
7. Tromsdalen 2
8. Ishavsbyen – withdrew after season
9. Krokelvdalen
10. Nordreisa
11. Salangen
12. Ringvassøy – relegated

Finnmark

1. Kirkenes − lost playoff
2. Bossekop
3. Alta 2
4. Tverrelvdalen – withdrew after season
5. Sørøy Glimt – withdrew after season
6. Porsanger
7. Norild
8. Nordlys
9. Indrefjord
10. Honningsvåg – relegated

== Playoffs ==
- Åssiden beat Hei.
- Flint beat Råde
- Surnadal beat Herd.
- Harstad beat Innstranda.
- Ulfstind beat Kirkenes.
- Innstranda beat Kirkenes
