= 2003 Norwegian Third Division =

Norwegian football league season

The 2003 season of the 3. divisjon, the fourth highest association football league for men in Norway.

22 games were played in 24 groups, with 3 points given for wins and 1 for draws. Twelve teams were promoted to the 2. divisjon through playoff.

== Tables ==
Group 1

1. Asker – lost playoff
2. Fossum
3. Fredrikstad 2
4. Fagerborg
5. Moss 2
6. Lisleby
7. Kjelsås 2
8. Røa
9. St. Hanshaugen
10. Greåker
11. Tistedalen – relegated
- Hellerud – pulled team

Group 2

1. Sparta – won playoff
2. Lyn 2
3. KFUM
4. Østsiden
5. Sarpsborg
6. Skeid 2
7. Rakkestad
8. Kvik Halden 2
9. Korsvoll
10. Grüner
11. Selbak
12. Torp – relegated

Group 3

1. Drøbak/Frogn – won playoff
2. Trøgstad/Båstad
3. Grorud
4. Kolbotn
5. Mercantile 2
6. Nordstrand
7. Spydeberg
8. Follo 2
9. Askim
10. Oppegård
11. Bækkelaget
12. Oslo Øst 2 – relegated

Group 4

1. Groruddalen – lost playoff
2. Vålerenga 2
3. Sørumsand
4. Grei
5. Fjellhamar
6. Nittedal
7. Leirsund
8. Rælingen
9. Bjerke
10. Skjetten 2
11. Lørenskog 2 – relegated
12. Bøler – relegated

Group 5

1. Elverum – won playoff
2. Strømmen
3. Kongsvinger 2
4. Sander
5. Trysil
6. Høland
7. Grue
8. Funnefoss/Vormsund
9. Galterud
10. Focus
11. Kurland
12. Aurskog/Finstadbru – relegated

Group 6

1. Brumunddal – lost playoff
2. Lom
3. Ham-Kam 2
4. Fart
5. Ringsaker
6. Hamar
7. Ringebu/Fåvang
8. Furnes
9. Follebu
10. Vang
11. Stange – relegated
12. Sel/Otta – relegated

Group 7

1. Jevnaker – lost playoff
2. Raufoss 2
3. SAFK Fagernes
4. Hønefoss BK 2
5. Hønefoss SK
6. Vardal
7. Hadeland
8. Toten
9. Vind
10. Kolbu/KK
11. Nordre Land – relegated
12. Søndre Land – relegated

Group 8

1. Notodden – lost playoff
2. Strømsgodset 2
3. Åssiden
4. Birkebeineren
5. Mjøndalen
6. Åmot
7. Drafn
8. Solberg
9. Seljord
10. Ullern
11. Vestfossen – relegated
12. Skiold – relegated

Group 9

1. Eik-Tønsberg – lost playoff
2. Råde
3. Ivrig
4. Ørn-Horten 2
5. FK Tønsberg 2 – relegated
6. Stokke
7. Borre
8. Flint
9. Falk
10. Rygge
11. Tjølling – relegated
12. Teie – relegated

Group 10

1. FK Arendal – won playoff
2. Larvik Turn
3. Skotfoss
4. Langesund/Stathelle
5. Skarphedin
6. Brevik
7. Larvik Fotball 2
8. Fyresdal
9. Pors Grenland 2
10. Urædd
11. Drangedal
12. Skidar – relegated

Group 11

1. Donn – won playoff
2. Flekkerøy
3. Lyngdal
4. Vigør
5. Vindbjart
6. Start 2
7. Våg
8. Trauma
9. Søgne
10. Randesund
11. Flekkefjord – relegated
12. Giv Akt – relegated

Group 12

1. Buøy – lost playoff
2. Eiger
3. Egersund
4. Randaberg
5. Bjerkreim
6. Hundvåg
7. Sola
8. Hana
9. Vaulen
10. Varhaug
11. Vardeneset
12. Ulf-Sandnes – relegated

Group 13

1. Sandnes FK – won playoff
2. Åkra
3. Torvastad
4. Haugesund 2
5. Bryne 2
6. Kopervik
7. Nord
8. Frøyland
9. Figgjo
10. Staal Jørpeland
11. Vedavåg Karmøy – relegated
12. Haugar – relegated

Group 14

1. Stord/Moster – lost playoff
2. Varegg
3. Askøy
4. Trott
5. Follese
6. Vadmyra
7. Trio
8. Arna-Bjørnar
9. Bremnes
10. Halsnøy
11. Loddefjord – relegated
12. Trane – relegated

Group 15

1. Norheimsund – won playoff
2. Lyngbø
3. Gneist
4. Bergen Nord
5. Radøy/Manger
6. Os
7. Voss
8. Hald
9. Tertnes
10. Austevoll
11. Sandviken – relegated
12. Ny-Krohnborg – relegated

Group 16

1. Jotun – won playoff
2. Stryn
3. Tornado Måløy
4. Fjøra
5. Førde
6. Skavøypoll
7. Florø
8. Sogndal 2
9. Sandane
10. Høyang
11. Saga
12. Kaupanger – relegated

Group 17

1. Volda – won playoff
2. Sykkylven
3. Spjelkavik
4. Aalesund 2
5. Brattvåg
6. Hødd 2
7. Hareid
8. Bergsøy
9. Ørsta
10. Ha/No – relegated
11. Aksla – relegated
12. Stordal – relegated

Group 18

1. Træff – lost playoff
2. Surnadal
3. Bryn
4. Eide og Omegn
5. Sunndal
6. Gossen
7. Bud
8. Åndalsnes
9. Kristiansund (-> Kristiansund BK)
10. Molde 3 – relegated
11. Midsund – relegated
12. Kvass/Ulvungen – relegated

Group 19

1. Orkla – lost playoff
2. Tynset
3. Stjørdals-Blink
4. Nardo
5. Flå
6. Melhus
7. Strindheim 2
8. Buvik
9. Sokna
10. NTNUI
11. Røros
12. Meldal – relegated

Group 20

1. Kolstad – won playoff
2. Ranheim
3. Namsos
4. Rørvik
5. Verdal
6. Beitstad
7. Rissa
8. Nidelv 2
9. Selbu
10. Vinne – relegated
11. Malvik
12. Vanvik – relegated

Group 21

1. Innstranden – lost playoff
2. Fauske/Sprint
3. Bodø/Glimt 2
4. Stålkameratene
5. Steigen
6. Mosjøen
7. Brønnøysund
8. Mo 2
9. Nordre Meløy
10. Saltdalkameratene
11. Sandnessjøen – relegated
12. Nesna – relegated

Group 22

1. Harstad – won playoff
2. Melbo – relegated
3. Grovfjord
4. Morild
5. Skånland
6. Medkila
7. Ballstad
8. Ballangen
9. Leknes
10. Bjerkvik
11. Stokmarknes – relegated
12. Lødingen – relegated

Group 23

1. Salangen – won playoff
2. Finnsnes
3. Tromsø 2
4. Senja
5. Lyngen/Karnes
6. Fløya
7. Tromsdalen 2
8. Ramfjord
9. Nordreisa
10. Ishavsbyen
11. Bardu – relegated
12. Brøstadbotn – relegated

Group 24

1. Båtsfjord – lost playoff
2. Porsanger
3. Alta 2
4. Kautokeino
5. Kirkenes
6. Rafsbotn
7. Polarstjernen
8. Tverrelvdalen
9. Nordlys – relegated
10. Neverfjord – relegated
11. Honningsvåg – relegated
12. Nordkinn – relegated
