= List of Norwegian football transfers summer 2012 =

The 2012 summer transfer window for Norwegian football transfers opened on 1 August and closed on 31 August 2012. Additionally, players without a club may join at any time. This list includes transfers featuring at least one Tippeligaen or Adeccoligaen club which are completed after the end of the winter 2011–12 transfer window and before the end of the 2012 summer window.

== Tippeligaen ==
=== Aalesund ===
In: Note: Flags indicate national team as defined under FIFA eligibility rules; some limited exceptions apply. Players may hold more than one non-FIFA nationality.

No.	Pos.	Nation	Player

Out: Note: Flags indicate national team as defined under FIFA eligibility rules; some limited exceptions apply. Players may hold more than one non-FIFA nationality.

No.	Pos.	Nation	Player
—	DF	(Finland) FIN	Ville Jalasto (to Stabæk)
—	FW	(Norway) NOR	Magnus Sylling Olsen (to Bodø/Glimt)

=== Brann ===
In: Note: Flags indicate national team as defined under FIFA eligibility rules; some limited exceptions apply. Players may hold more than one non-FIFA nationality.

No.	Pos.	Nation	Player
—	FW	(Norway) NOR	Erik Huseklepp (from Portsmouth)
—	DF	(Norway) NOR	Simen Wangberg (from Rosenborg)

Out: Note: Flags indicate national team as defined under FIFA eligibility rules; some limited exceptions apply. Players may hold more than one non-FIFA nationality.

No.	Pos.	Nation	Player
—	FW	(Senegal) SEN	Oumar Niasse (loan return to US Ouakam)
—	MF	(Jamaica) JAM	Rodolph Austin (to Leeds United)
—	DF	(Norway) NOR	Lars Grorud (to Fredrikstad)

=== Fredrikstad ===
In: Note: Flags indicate national team as defined under FIFA eligibility rules; some limited exceptions apply. Players may hold more than one non-FIFA nationality.

No.	Pos.	Nation	Player
—	MF	(Norway) NOR	Zlatko Tripić (loan from Molde)
—	DF	(Norway) NOR	Haitam Aleesami (from Skeid)
—	MF	(Serbia) SRB	Nenad Sreckovic (from De Graafschap)
—	DF	(Norway) NOR	Lars Grorud (from Brann)

Out: Note: Flags indicate national team as defined under FIFA eligibility rules; some limited exceptions apply. Players may hold more than one non-FIFA nationality.

No.	Pos.	Nation	Player
—	MF	(Norway) NOR	Etzaz Hussain (to Molde)
—	DF	(Norway) NOR	Benjamin Dahl Hagen (loan return to Vålerenga)
—	MF	(Norway) NOR	Tarik Elyounoussi (to Rosenborg)

=== Haugesund ===
In: Note: Flags indicate national team as defined under FIFA eligibility rules; some limited exceptions apply. Players may hold more than one non-FIFA nationality.

No.	Pos.	Nation	Player
—	FW	(Sweden) SWE	Pontus Engblom (from AIK)
—	MF	(Bosnia and Herzegovina) BIH	Amer Osmanagic (from OFK Beograd)
—	DF	(Sweden) SWE	David Myrestam (from GIF Sundsvall)

Out: Note: Flags indicate national team as defined under FIFA eligibility rules; some limited exceptions apply. Players may hold more than one non-FIFA nationality.

No.	Pos.	Nation	Player
—	DF	(France) FRA	Derek Decamps (free transfer)
—	DF	(Canada) CAN	Chris Pozniak (loan to Bryne)
—	MF	(Norway) NOR	Eirik Ulland Andersen (to Vard Haugesund)

=== Hønefoss ===
In: Note: Flags indicate national team as defined under FIFA eligibility rules; some limited exceptions apply. Players may hold more than one non-FIFA nationality.

No.	Pos.	Nation	Player

Out: Note: Flags indicate national team as defined under FIFA eligibility rules; some limited exceptions apply. Players may hold more than one non-FIFA nationality.

No.	Pos.	Nation	Player
—	FW	(Finland) FIN	Roope Riski (loan return to Cesena)
—	MF	(Norway) NOR	Christoffer Dahl (retired)

=== Lillestrøm ===
In: Note: Flags indicate national team as defined under FIFA eligibility rules; some limited exceptions apply. Players may hold more than one non-FIFA nationality.

No.	Pos.	Nation	Player
—	FW	(Norway) NOR	Thorstein Helstad (from AS Monaco)
—	MF	(Norway) NOR	Espen Søgård (from Start)
—	DF	(Norway) NOR	Anders Østli (from SønderjyskE)
—	GK	(Norway) NOR	Lasse Staw (from Syrianska)

Out: Note: Flags indicate national team as defined under FIFA eligibility rules; some limited exceptions apply. Players may hold more than one non-FIFA nationality.

No.	Pos.	Nation	Player
—	FW	(Iceland) ISL	Björn Bergmann Sigurdarson (to Wolverhampton)
—	FW	(England) ENG	Luke Rodgers (free transfer)
—	FW	(Norway) NOR	Arild Sundgot (retired)
—	DF	(Norway) NOR	Isak Scheel (loan to Bærum)

=== Molde ===
In: Note: Flags indicate national team as defined under FIFA eligibility rules; some limited exceptions apply. Players may hold more than one non-FIFA nationality.

No.	Pos.	Nation	Player
—	MF	(Senegal) SEN	Makhtar Thioune (loan return from Karlsruhe)
—	MF	(Norway) NOR	Pål Erik Ulvestad (loan return from Kristiansund)
—	MF	(Norway) NOR	Etzaz Hussain (from Fredrikstad)
—	GK	(Norway) NOR	Elias Valderhaug (loan return from Start)
—	DF	(Norway) NOR	Magnar Ødegaard (from Sarpsborg 08)

Out: Note: Flags indicate national team as defined under FIFA eligibility rules; some limited exceptions apply. Players may hold more than one non-FIFA nationality.

No.	Pos.	Nation	Player
—	DF	(Norway) NOR	Simon Markeng (loan to Kristiansund)
—	GK	(Norway) NOR	Elias Valderhaug (to Kongsvinger)
—	MF	(Senegal) SEN	Makhtar Thioune (to Viking)
—	MF	(Norway) NOR	Zlatko Tripić (loan to Fredrikstad)
—	FW	(Brazil) BRA	Vini Dantas (to Bodø/Glimt)

=== Odd Grenland ===
In: Note: Flags indicate national team as defined under FIFA eligibility rules; some limited exceptions apply. Players may hold more than one non-FIFA nationality.

No.	Pos.	Nation	Player

Out: Note: Flags indicate national team as defined under FIFA eligibility rules; some limited exceptions apply. Players may hold more than one non-FIFA nationality.

No.	Pos.	Nation	Player
—	FW	(Norway) NOR	Torgeir Børven (from Odd Grenland)

=== Rosenborg ===
In: Note: Flags indicate national team as defined under FIFA eligibility rules; some limited exceptions apply. Players may hold more than one non-FIFA nationality.

No.	Pos.	Nation	Player
—	DF	(Norway) NOR	Tore Reginiussen (from Odense)
—	MF	(El Salvador) SLV	Jaime Alas (from Luis Ángel Firpo)
—	GK	(Norway) NOR	Jacob Storevik (from Florø)
—	FW	(Norway) NOR	Tarik Elyounoussi (from Fredrikstad)
—	MF	(United States) USA	Mikkel Diskerud (from Stabæk)
—	GK	(Norway) NOR	Alexander Lund Hansen (from Start)

Out: Note: Flags indicate national team as defined under FIFA eligibility rules; some limited exceptions apply. Players may hold more than one non-FIFA nationality.

No.	Pos.	Nation	Player
—	DF	(Denmark) DEN	Jim Larsen (to Club Brugge)
—	MF	(Norway) NOR	Markus Henriksen (to AZ)
—	DF	(Norway) NOR	Simen Wangberg (to Brann)
—	DF	(Denmark) DEN	Peter Ankersen (to Esbjerg)
—	MF	(Norway) NOR	Daniel Berntsen (on loan to Bodø/Glimt)

=== Sandnes Ulf ===
In: Note: Flags indicate national team as defined under FIFA eligibility rules; some limited exceptions apply. Players may hold more than one non-FIFA nationality.

No.	Pos.	Nation	Player
—	MF	(Denmark) DEN	Morten Bertolt (from Lyngby)

Out: Note: Flags indicate national team as defined under FIFA eligibility rules; some limited exceptions apply. Players may hold more than one non-FIFA nationality.

No.	Pos.	Nation	Player
—	FW	(Gabon) GAB	Gilles Mbang Ondo (free transfer)
—	MF	(Nigeria) NGA	Mobi Okoli (to Bryne)

=== Sogndal ===
In: Note: Flags indicate national team as defined under FIFA eligibility rules; some limited exceptions apply. Players may hold more than one non-FIFA nationality.

No.	Pos.	Nation	Player
—	MF	(Brazil) BRA	Ricardo Santos (from Djurgården)
—	DF	(Norway) NOR	Azar Karadas (from Kasımpaşa)

Out: Note: Flags indicate national team as defined under FIFA eligibility rules; some limited exceptions apply. Players may hold more than one non-FIFA nationality.

No.	Pos.	Nation	Player

=== Stabæk ===
In: Note: Flags indicate national team as defined under FIFA eligibility rules; some limited exceptions apply. Players may hold more than one non-FIFA nationality.

No.	Pos.	Nation	Player
—	DF	(Iceland) ISL	Elfar Freyr Helgason (from AEK Athens)
—	MF	(United States) USA	Mikkel Diskerud (loan return from Gent)
—	DF	(Finland) FIN	Ville Jalasto (from Aalesund)
—	FW	(Norway) NOR	Abdurahim Laajab (on loan from Vålerenga)

Out: Note: Flags indicate national team as defined under FIFA eligibility rules; some limited exceptions apply. Players may hold more than one non-FIFA nationality.

No.	Pos.	Nation	Player
—	DF	(Norway) NOR	Vegar Eggen Hedenstad (to Freiburg)
—	MF	(United States) USA	Ricardo Clark (loan return to Eintracht Frankfurt)
—	MF	(United States) USA	Mikkel Diskerud (to Rosenborg)

=== Strømsgodset ===
In: Note: Flags indicate national team as defined under FIFA eligibility rules; some limited exceptions apply. Players may hold more than one non-FIFA nationality.

No.	Pos.	Nation	Player
—	DF	(Norway) NOR	Jarl André Storbæk (from SønderjyskE)
—	MF	(Norway) NOR	Abdisalam Ibrahim (on loan from Manchester City)
—	MF	(Ghana) GHA	Bismark Adjei-Boateng (on loan from Right to Dream)
—	MF	(Ghana) GHA	Enock Kwakwa (on loan from Right to Dream)

Out: Note: Flags indicate national team as defined under FIFA eligibility rules; some limited exceptions apply. Players may hold more than one non-FIFA nationality.

No.	Pos.	Nation	Player
—	MF	(Ghana) GHA	Mohammed Abu (loan return to Manchester City)
—	MF	(Sierra Leone) SLE	Alfred Sankoh (to Şanlıurfaspor)
—	MF	(Norway) NOR	André Hanssen (retired)

=== Tromsø ===
In: Note: Flags indicate national team as defined under FIFA eligibility rules; some limited exceptions apply. Players may hold more than one non-FIFA nationality.

No.	Pos.	Nation	Player
—	FW	(Czech Republic) CZE	Zdeněk Ondrášek (from České Budějovice)

Out: Note: Flags indicate national team as defined under FIFA eligibility rules; some limited exceptions apply. Players may hold more than one non-FIFA nationality.

No.	Pos.	Nation	Player
—	FW	(Norway) NOR	Mohammed Ahamed (to Tromsdalen)
—	FW	(Norway) NOR	Vegard Lysvoll (on loan to Tromsdalen)

=== Viking ===
In: Note: Flags indicate national team as defined under FIFA eligibility rules; some limited exceptions apply. Players may hold more than one non-FIFA nationality.

No.	Pos.	Nation	Player
—	MF	(Senegal) SEN	Makhtar Thioune (from Molde)

Out: Note: Flags indicate national team as defined under FIFA eligibility rules; some limited exceptions apply. Players may hold more than one non-FIFA nationality.

No.	Pos.	Nation	Player
—	FW	(Paraguay) PAR	Nery Cardozo (loan return to Club Rubio Ñu)
—	MF	(Norway) NOR	Valon Berisha (to Red Bull Salzburg)
—	GK	(Norway) NOR	Arild Østbø (on loan to Start)

=== Vålerenga ===
In: Note: Flags indicate national team as defined under FIFA eligibility rules; some limited exceptions apply. Players may hold more than one non-FIFA nationality.

No.	Pos.	Nation	Player
—	FW	(Canada) CAN	Tosaint Ricketts (from Politehnica Timișoara)
—	FW	(Nigeria) NGA	Aaron Samuel Olanare (from Festac Sports)
—	MF	(Senegal) SEN	Pape Maly Diamanka (on loan from Rayo Vallecano)
—	FW	(Norway) NOR	Torgeir Børven (from Odd Grenland)
—	DF	(Costa Rica) CRC	Giancarlo González (from Alajuelense)
—	FW	(United States) USA	Chad Barrett (on loan from Los Angeles Galaxy)
—	DF	(Norway) NOR	Benjamin Dahl Hagen (loan return from Fredrikstad)
—	FW	(Norway) NOR	Chuma Anene (loan return from Ullensaker/Kisa)

Out: Note: Flags indicate national team as defined under FIFA eligibility rules; some limited exceptions apply. Players may hold more than one non-FIFA nationality.

No.	Pos.	Nation	Player
—	FW	(Norway) NOR	Abdurahim Laajab (on loan to Stabæk)
—	FW	(Norway) NOR	Dawda Leigh (to Sandefjord)
—	FW	(Austria) AUT	Martin Pusic (to Fredrikstad)
—	FW	(Iceland) ISL	Veigar Pall Gunnarsson (to Stabæk)
—	MF	(Norway) NOR	Harmeet Singh (to Feyenoord)
—	FW	(Norway) NOR	Håvard Nielsen (to Red Bull Salzburg)
—	FW	(Norway) NOR	Marcus Pedersen (loan return to Vitesse Arnhem)

== Adeccoligaen ==
=== Bodø/Glimt ===
In: Note: Flags indicate national team as defined under FIFA eligibility rules; some limited exceptions apply. Players may hold more than one non-FIFA nationality.

No.	Pos.	Nation	Player
—	FW	(Norway) NOR	Magnus Sylling Olsen (from Aalesund)
—	FW	(Brazil) BRA	Vini Dantas (from Molde)
—	MF	(Norway) NOR	Daniel Berntsen (on loan from Rosenborg)

Out: Note: Flags indicate national team as defined under FIFA eligibility rules; some limited exceptions apply. Players may hold more than one non-FIFA nationality.

No.	Pos.	Nation	Player

=== Bryne ===
In: Note: Flags indicate national team as defined under FIFA eligibility rules; some limited exceptions apply. Players may hold more than one non-FIFA nationality.

No.	Pos.	Nation	Player
—	DF	(Canada) CAN	Chris Pozniak (loan from Haugesund)
—	MF	(Nigeria) NGA	Mobi Okoli (from Sandnes Ulf)

Out: Note: Flags indicate national team as defined under FIFA eligibility rules; some limited exceptions apply. Players may hold more than one non-FIFA nationality.

No.	Pos.	Nation	Player
—	FW	(New Zealand) NZL	Kris Bright (to FC Haka)

=== Bærum ===
In: Note: Flags indicate national team as defined under FIFA eligibility rules; some limited exceptions apply. Players may hold more than one non-FIFA nationality.

No.	Pos.	Nation	Player
—	DF	(Norway) NOR	Isak Scheel (loan from Lillestrøm)

Out: Note: Flags indicate national team as defined under FIFA eligibility rules; some limited exceptions apply. Players may hold more than one non-FIFA nationality.

No.	Pos.	Nation	Player

=== Kongsvinger ===
In: Note: Flags indicate national team as defined under FIFA eligibility rules; some limited exceptions apply. Players may hold more than one non-FIFA nationality.

No.	Pos.	Nation	Player
—	FW	(El Salvador) SLV	Léster Blanco (on loan from Isidro Metapán)
—	GK	(Norway) NOR	Elias Valderhaug (from Molde)

Out: Note: Flags indicate national team as defined under FIFA eligibility rules; some limited exceptions apply. Players may hold more than one non-FIFA nationality.

No.	Pos.	Nation	Player

=== Sandefjord ===
In: Note: Flags indicate national team as defined under FIFA eligibility rules; some limited exceptions apply. Players may hold more than one non-FIFA nationality.

No.	Pos.	Nation	Player
—	MF	(Norway) NOR	Dawda Leigh (from Vålerenga)
—	FW	(Norway) NOR	Kamal Saaliti (from Sandnes Ulf)
—	DF	(Norway) NOR	Kim Skogsrud (from Rangers)
—	DF	(Norway) NOR	Tom Skogsrud (from Rangers)

Out: Note: Flags indicate national team as defined under FIFA eligibility rules; some limited exceptions apply. Players may hold more than one non-FIFA nationality.

No.	Pos.	Nation	Player
—	MF	(Norway) NOR	Kristoffer Normann Hansen (on loan to Fram Larvik)
—	DF	(Sweden) SWE	Peter Magnusson (to IK Brage)
—	MF	(Norway) NOR	Kenneth Dokken (retired)

=== Sarpsborg 08 ===
In: Note: Flags indicate national team as defined under FIFA eligibility rules; some limited exceptions apply. Players may hold more than one non-FIFA nationality.

No.	Pos.	Nation	Player
—	MF	(Norway) NOR	Christian Brink (from GIF Sundsvall)

Out: Note: Flags indicate national team as defined under FIFA eligibility rules; some limited exceptions apply. Players may hold more than one non-FIFA nationality.

No.	Pos.	Nation	Player
—	DF	(Norway) NOR	Magnar Ødegaard (to Molde)

=== Start ===
In: Note: Flags indicate national team as defined under FIFA eligibility rules; some limited exceptions apply. Players may hold more than one non-FIFA nationality.

No.	Pos.	Nation	Player
—	GK	(Norway) NOR	Arild Østbø (on loan from Viking)

Out: Note: Flags indicate national team as defined under FIFA eligibility rules; some limited exceptions apply. Players may hold more than one non-FIFA nationality.

No.	Pos.	Nation	Player
—	MF	(Norway) NOR	Espen Søgård (to Lillestrøm)
—	GK	(Norway) NOR	Elias Valderhaug (loan return to Molde)

=== Tromsdalen ===
In: Note: Flags indicate national team as defined under FIFA eligibility rules; some limited exceptions apply. Players may hold more than one non-FIFA nationality.

No.	Pos.	Nation	Player
—	FW	(Norway) NOR	Mohammed Ahamed (from Tromsø)
—	FW	(Norway) NOR	Vegard Lysvoll (on loan from Tromsø)

Out: Note: Flags indicate national team as defined under FIFA eligibility rules; some limited exceptions apply. Players may hold more than one non-FIFA nationality.

No.	Pos.	Nation	Player
