= Play-offs to the Norwegian First Division (women) =

Norwegian football league play-offs

The Play-offs to the 1. divisjon for women in association football is a Norwegian play-off competition that have taken place from 2001.

The play-offs were instituted because of the streamlining of the 1. divisjon (second tier) ahead of the 2001 season, into one national league. Before that, the 1. divisjon consisted of several groups, whose teams themselves engaged in a playoff to the Toppserien, the first tier.

The playoffs have never had a clear-cut institutionalized shape or form.

== 2011 ==
=== Pool 1 ===
Pos	Team	Pld	W	D	L	GF	GA	GD	Pts	Promotion
1	Kongsvinger (P)	2	2	0	0	9	1	+8	6	Promotion to the 2012 1. divisjon
2	Tromsdalen	2	0	1	1	2	6	−4	1	
3	Sunndal	2	0	1	1	1	5	−4	1	

Source: nifs.no
(P) Promoted

=== Pool 2 ===
Pos	Team	Pld	W	D	L	GF	GA	GD	Pts	Promotion
1	Åsane (P)	2	2	0	0	10	4	+6	6	Promotion to the 2012 1. divisjon
2	Raufoss	1	0	0	1	3	6	−3	0	
3	Urædd	1	0	0	1	1	4	−3	0	

Source: nifs.no
(P) Promoted

== 2010 ==
=== Pool 1 ===
Pos	Team	Pld	W	D	L	GF	GA	GD	Pts	Promotion
1	Sarpsborg 08 (P)	2	1	1	0	5	3	+2	4	Promotion to the 2011 1. divisjon
2	Sunndal	2	1	0	1	4	5	−1	3	
3	Tromsdalen	2	0	1	1	4	5	−1	1	

Source: Speaker.no
(P) Promoted

=== Pool 2 ===
Pos	Team	Pld	W	D	L	GF	GA	GD	Pts	Promotion
1	Avaldsnes (P)	2	1	1	0	5	4	+1	4	Promotion to the 2011 1. divisjon
2	Kongsvinger	2	1	1	0	3	2	+1	4	
3	Urædd	2	0	0	2	4	6	−2	0	

Source: Speaker.no
(P) Promoted

== 2008 ==
First, there was a pre-playoff between the Northern Norwegian teams:

1. Alta – won
2. Bossmo & Ytteren
3. Sortland

Then, eight teams, of which two from the 1. divisjon, faced another team in two legs.

- Gjøvik beat Eik-Tønsberg on the away goals rule; 3–3 on aggregate (and Gjøvik stayed in the 1. divisjon)
- Linderud-Grei beat Vålerenga 7–5 on aggregate (and L-G stayed in the 1. divisjon)
- Orkla beat Sola 3–1 on aggregate
- Alta beat Borgen 4–1 on aggregate

Reference: Norwegian Women's Football

== 2007 ==
First, there was a pre-playoff between the Northern Norwegian teams:

1. Alta – won
2. Sortland
3. Halsøy

Then the actual playoff consisted of two groups.

1. Gjøvik – promoted
2. Alta
3. Orkla
1. Voss – promoted
2. Fossum
3. Vålerenga

Reference: Norwegian Women's Football

== 2006 ==
First, there was a pre-playoff between the Northern Norwegian teams:

1. Tromsdalen – won
2. Innstranden
3. Leknes

Then the actual playoff consisted of two groups.

1. Tromsdalen – promoted
2. Skjetten – promoted
3. Ranheim
1. Donn – promoted
2. Linderud-Grei – promoted (after yet another one-on-one playoff against Sola)
3. Sola

Reference: Norwegian Women's Football

== 2005 ==
First, there was a pre-playoff between the Northern Norwegian teams:

1. Tromsdalen – won
2. Bossmo & Ytteren
3. Alta
4. Mjølner

Then the actual playoff consisted of two groups.

1. Manglerud Star – promoted
2. Orkla
3. Tromsdalen
1. Haugar – promoted
2. Skjetten
3. Donn

Reference: Norwegian Women's Football

== 2004 ==
First, there were several pre-playoffs:

- Kaupanger beat Hana 18–0 on aggregate
- Grand Bodø beat both Leknes and Leknes
- Træff beat Orkla

Then the actual playoff consisted of two groups.

1. Grand Bodø – promoted
2. Linderud-Grei
3. Træff
1. Kaupanger – promoted
2. Skjetten
3. Donn

Reference: Norwegian Women's Football

== 2003 ==
First, there were two pre-playoffs:

- Ranheim beat Eid 11–0 in one match
- Grand Bodø beat both Leknes and Tromsdalen

Then the actual playoff consisted of two groups.

1. Fart – promoted
2. Ranheim
3. Grand Bodø
1. Bamble – promoted
2. Nymark
3. Vallset

Reference: Norwegian Women's Football

== 2002 ==
First, there were two pre-playoffs:

- Kattem beat Træff 7–1 in one match
- Innstranden beat both Leknes and Tromsdalen

Then the actual playoff consisted of two groups.

1. Kattem – promoted
2. Vallset
3. Innstranden
1. Amazon Grimstad – promoted
2. Kaupanger
3. Storhamar

Reference: Norwegian Women's Football

== 2001 ==
First, there were two pre-playoffs:

- Herd beat Orkla 1–0 in one match
- Innstranden beat both Håkvik and Alta

Then the actual playoff consisted of two groups.

1. Skeid – promoted
2. Innstranden
3. Herd
1. Gjelleråsen – promoted
2. Nymark
3. Fossum

Reference: Norwegian Women's Football
