= 2024 Norwegian Third Division =

Norwegian football season

Norwegian Third Division
- Season: 2024
- Champions: Asker; Hønefoss; Pors; Rana; Sandviken; Træff
- Promoted: Asker; Hønefoss; Pors; Rana; Sandviken; Træff
- Relegated: Bodø/Glimt 2 Florø; Frøya; Gjelleråsen; Hødd 2 Innstranda*; Mandalskameratene; Mjølner; Mjøndalen 2 Mosjøen; Orkla; Skeid 2 Sprint-Jeløy; Start 2 Verdal; Vigør; Årdal; Åskollen

The 2024 Norwegian Third Division (referred to as Norsk Tipping-ligaen for sponsorship reasons) was a fourth-tier Norwegian football league season. The league consisted of 84 teams divided into 6 groups of 14 teams each. The season started on 2 April 2024 and ended on 27 October 2024. The league was played as a double round-robin tournament, where all teams played 26 matches.

== League tables ==
=== Group 1 ===
Pos	Team	Pld	W	D	L	GF	GA	GD	Pts	Promotion or relegation
1	Sandviken (C, P)	26	22	3	1	76	24	+52	69	Promotion to Second Division
2	Bjarg	26	22	2	2	86	27	+59	68	
3	Os	26	15	2	9	72	40	+32	47	
4	Askøy	26	13	8	5	58	42	+16	47	
5	Djerv 1919	26	14	3	9	64	50	+14	45	
6	Førde	26	14	3	9	55	48	+7	45	
7	Fana	26	13	4	9	62	49	+13	43	
8	Haugesund 2	26	8	5	13	51	53	−2	29	
9	Loddefjord	26	7	7	12	55	69	−14	28	
10	Stord	26	8	4	14	59	74	−15	28	
11	Åsane 2	26	7	3	16	50	85	−35	24	
12	Frøya (R)	26	6	4	16	44	61	−17	22	Relegation to Fourth Division
13	Årdal (R)	26	7	1	18	57	91	−34	22	Relegation to Fourth Division
14	Florø (R)	26	1	1	24	21	97	−76	4	Relegation to Fourth Division

Source: NFF (in Norwegian)
Rules for classification: 1) Points; 2) Goal difference; 3) Goals scored; 4) Head-to-head points; 5) Head-to-head goal difference; 6) Head-to-head goals scored.
(C) Champions; (P) Promoted; (R) Relegated

=== Group 2 ===
Pos	Team	Pld	W	D	L	GF	GA	GD	Pts	Promotion or relegation
1	Pors (C, P)	26	19	4	3	56	25	+31	61	Promotion to Second Division
2	Vidar	26	19	0	7	81	34	+47	57	
3	Brodd	26	16	6	4	59	35	+24	54	
4	Fram Larvik	26	16	5	5	64	44	+20	53	
5	Vindbjart	26	13	5	8	38	29	+9	44	
6	Madla	26	12	2	12	61	58	+3	38	
7	Staal Jørpeland	26	11	4	11	56	57	−1	37	
8	Sandefjord 2	26	10	4	12	64	57	+7	34	
9	Sola	26	10	4	12	60	58	+2	34	
10	Odd 2	26	10	2	14	59	57	+2	32	
11	Sandnes Ulf 2	26	9	2	15	47	69	−22	29	
12	Mandalskameratene (R)	26	6	5	15	41	65	−24	23	Relegation to Fourth Division
13	Start 2 (R)	26	5	3	18	45	66	−21	18	Relegation to Fourth Division
14	Vigør (R)	26	3	0	23	24	101	−77	9	Relegation to Fourth Division

Source: NFF (in Norwegian)
Rules for classification: 1) Points; 2) Goal difference; 3) Goals scored; 4) Head-to-head points; 5) Head-to-head goal difference; 6) Head-to-head goals scored.
(C) Champions; (P) Promoted; (R) Relegated

=== Group 3 ===
Pos	Team	Pld	W	D	L	GF	GA	GD	Pts	Promotion or relegation
1	Asker (C, P)	26	20	2	4	82	39	+43	62	Promotion to Second Division
2	Nordstrand	26	18	5	3	77	30	+47	59	
3	Frigg	26	17	4	5	89	42	+47	55	
4	Gamle Oslo	26	16	5	5	71	46	+25	53	
5	Bærum	26	13	7	6	61	47	+14	46	
6	Sarpsborg 08 2	26	11	5	10	51	50	+1	38	
7	Oppsal	26	10	3	13	50	43	+7	33	
8	KFUM Oslo 2	26	9	5	12	50	52	−2	32	
9	Ullern	26	9	5	12	47	57	−10	32	
10	Åssiden	26	9	4	13	44	70	−26	31	
11	Flint	26	8	5	13	44	51	−7	29	
12	Skeid 2 (R)	26	5	4	17	48	80	−32	19	Relegation to Fourth Division
13	Åskollen (R)	26	4	4	18	39	96	−57	16	Relegation to Fourth Division
14	Mjøndalen 2 (R)	26	3	2	21	29	79	−50	11	Relegation to Fourth Division

Source: NFF (in Norwegian)
Rules for classification: 1) Points; 2) Goal difference; 3) Goals scored; 4) Head-to-head points; 5) Head-to-head goal difference; 6) Head-to-head goals scored.
(C) Champions; (P) Promoted; (R) Relegated

=== Group 4 ===
Pos	Team	Pld	W	D	L	GF	GA	GD	Pts	Promotion or relegation
1	Rana (C, P)	26	20	2	4	81	29	+52	62	Promotion to Second Division
2	Nardo	26	19	2	5	83	27	+56	59	
3	Trygg/Lade	26	17	3	6	66	32	+34	54	
4	Melhus	26	12	6	8	62	48	+14	42	
5	Strømsgodset 2	26	12	4	10	67	63	+4	40	
6	Lillestrøm 2	26	12	2	12	67	65	+2	38	
7	Tiller	26	11	5	10	46	50	−4	38	
8	Rosenborg 2	26	10	5	11	43	45	−2	35	
9	Stabæk 2	26	8	8	10	57	48	+9	32	
10	Byåsen	26	8	7	11	42	51	−9	31	
11	Surnadal	26	9	3	14	46	65	−19	30	
12	Verdal (R)	26	6	6	14	39	68	−29	24	Relegation to Fourth Division
13	Orkla (R)	26	6	3	17	33	67	−34	21	Relegation to Fourth Division
14	Mosjøen (R)	26	2	4	20	26	100	−74	10	Relegation to Fourth Division

Source: NFF (in Norwegian)
Rules for classification: 1) Points; 2) Goal difference; 3) Goals scored; 4) Head-to-head points; 5) Head-to-head goal difference; 6) Head-to-head goals scored.
(C) Champions; (P) Promoted; (R) Relegated

=== Group 5 ===
Pos	Team	Pld	W	D	L	GF	GA	GD	Pts	Promotion or relegation
1	Træff (C, P)	26	20	5	1	61	16	+45	65	Promotion to Second Division
2	Lørenskog	26	16	5	5	57	28	+29	53	
3	Ready	26	15	5	6	64	39	+25	50	
4	Skjetten	26	14	4	8	55	33	+22	46	
5	Bjørkelangen	26	14	3	9	48	35	+13	45	
6	Lokomotiv Oslo	26	13	6	7	46	34	+12	45	
7	Aalesund 2	26	10	3	13	43	49	−6	33	
8	Molde 2	26	9	4	13	45	59	−14	31	
9	Spjelkavik	26	7	9	10	46	41	+5	30	
10	Kristiansund 2	26	7	6	13	35	54	−19	27	
11	Skedsmo	26	6	6	14	31	43	−12	24	
12	Funnefoss/Vormsund	26	6	6	14	31	55	−24	24	
13	Gjelleråsen (R)	26	5	9	12	38	69	−31	24	Relegation to Fourth Division
14	Hødd 2 (R)	26	3	3	20	29	74	−45	12	Relegation to Fourth Division

Source: NFF (in Norwegian)
Rules for classification: 1) Points; 2) Goal difference; 3) Goals scored; 4) Head-to-head points; 5) Head-to-head goal difference; 6) Head-to-head goals scored.
(C) Champions; (P) Promoted; (R) Relegated
- Funnefoss/Vormsund survived relegation due to the post-season withdrawal of Innstranda.

=== Group 6 ===
Pos	Team	Pld	W	D	L	GF	GA	GD	Pts	Promotion or relegation
1	Hønefoss (C, P)	26	24	2	0	117	17	+100	74	Promotion to Second Division
2	Fløya	26	19	3	4	82	30	+52	60	
3	Elverum	26	19	1	6	74	31	+43	58	
4	Harstad	26	15	6	5	55	39	+16	51	
5	Skjervøy	26	16	2	8	64	44	+20	50	
6	Kongsvinger 2	26	12	5	9	56	49	+7	41	
7	HamKam 2	26	11	2	13	62	60	+2	35	
8	Fredrikstad 2	26	9	4	13	35	49	−14	31	
9	Fyllingsdalen	26	7	4	15	31	68	−37	25	
10	Ulfstind	26	6	6	14	59	70	−11	24	
11	Innstranda (R)	26	7	3	16	36	64	−28	24	Relegation to Fourth Division
12	Sprint-Jeløy (R)	26	7	2	17	26	67	−41	23	Relegation to Fourth Division
13	Mjølner (R)	26	5	6	15	36	67	−31	21	Relegation to Fourth Division
14	Bodø/Glimt 2 (R)	26	1	2	23	26	104	−78	5	Relegation to Fourth Division

Source: NFF (in Norwegian)
Rules for classification: 1) Points; 2) Goal difference; 3) Goals scored; 4) Head-to-head points; 5) Head-to-head goal difference; 6) Head-to-head goals scored.
(C) Champions; (P) Promoted; (R) Relegated
