= Martin Dimov =

Martin Dimov may refer to:

- Martin Dimov (footballer, born 1984), Bulgarian footballer
- Martin Dimov (footballer, born 1986), Bulgarian football manager and footballer
