= Grønlie =

Grønlie is a Norwegian surname and may refer to:

- Ole Tobias Grønlie (1871–1954), Norwegian geologist and professor
- Tore Grønlie (born 1946), Norwegian professor or archeology

== See also ==
- Grønli
- Grønlid
