= Grønli =

Grønli is a Norwegian surname and may refer to:

- Bente Grønli (born 1956), Norwegian paralympic athlete
- Jan Grønli (born 1950), Norwegian actor
- Janne Grønli (born 1972), Norwegian sleep researcher
- Odd Birger Grønli (born 1953), Norwegian journalist
- Sigurd Grønli (footballer) (born 2000), Norwegian footballer
- Sigurd Grønli (rower) (1927–2001), Norwegian rower
- Siri Nordeide Grønli (born 1984), Norwegian footballer
- Sondre Grønli (born 2005), Norwegian ice hockey player
- Stian Grønli (born 2002), Norwegian cross-country skier

== See also ==
- Høgli/Grønli, Norwegian district of Senja
- Grønlid
- Grønlie
