= 2026 Norwegian Third Division =

Norwegian football season

Norwegian Third Division
- Season: 2026
- Matches: 1,092

The 2026 Norwegian Third Division (referred to as Norsk Tipping-ligaen for sponsorship reasons) will be a fourth-tier Norwegian men's football league season. The league consists of 84 teams divided into 6 groups of 14 teams each. The season will start on 6 April and is scheduled to end on 31 October. The league is played as a double round-robin tournament, where all teams play 26 matches.

== League tables ==
=== Group 1 ===
Pos	Team	Pld	W	D	L	GF	GA	GD	Pts	Promotion or relegation
1	Asker	24	21	1	2	84	35	+49	64	Promotion to Second Division
2	Heming	24	14	5	5	62	38	+24	47	
3	Gamle Oslo	24	14	2	8	71	44	+27	44	
4	Vålerenga 2	24	14	1	9	56	61	−5	43	
5	Ready	24	11	6	7	60	46	+14	39	
6	Bærum	24	12	2	10	66	46	+20	38	
7	Union Carl Berner	24	12	2	10	44	36	+8	38	
8	Frigg	24	9	6	9	53	58	−5	33	
9	Lokomotiv Oslo	24	9	2	13	46	68	−22	29	
10	KFUM Oslo 2	24	7	4	13	49	66	−17	25	
11	Grei	24	8	1	15	44	73	−29	25	
12	Ullern	24	7	2	15	43	62	−19	23	Relegation to Fourth Division
13	Nordstrand	24	6	2	16	36	54	−18	20	Relegation to Fourth Division
14	Konnerud	24	5	2	17	38	65	−27	17	Relegation to Fourth Division

Updated to match(es) played on 19 October 2026. Source: NFF (in Norwegian)
Rules for classification: 1) Points; 2) Goal difference; 3) Goals scored; 4) Head-to-head points; 5) Head-to-head goal difference; 6) Head-to-head goals scored.

=== Group 2 ===
Pos	Team	Pld	W	D	L	GF	GA	GD	Pts	Promotion or relegation
1	Volda	25	17	4	4	67	26	+41	55	Promotion to Second Division
2	Strindheim	25	17	4	4	74	31	+43	55	
3	Byåsen	25	13	4	8	61	48	+13	43	
4	Melhus	25	12	6	7	56	30	+26	42	
5	Molde 2	25	10	5	10	66	80	−14	35	
6	Rosenborg 2	25	10	4	11	55	47	+8	34	
7	Nardo	25	10	3	12	66	53	+13	33	
8	Herd	25	9	5	11	49	60	−11	32	
9	Spjelkavik	25	8	5	12	45	56	−11	29	
10	Ranheim 2	25	8	5	12	62	77	−15	29	
11	Kvik	25	8	5	12	37	57	−20	29	
12	NTNUI	25	7	7	11	36	55	−19	28	Relegation to Fourth Division
13	Aalesund 2	25	7	4	14	45	70	−25	25	Relegation to Fourth Division
14	Orkla	25	6	5	14	43	72	−29	23	Relegation to Fourth Division

Updated to match(es) played on 26 October 2026. Source: NFF (in Norwegian)
Rules for classification: 1) Points; 2) Goal difference; 3) Goals scored; 4) Head-to-head points; 5) Head-to-head goal difference; 6) Head-to-head goals scored.

=== Group 3 ===
Pos	Team	Pld	W	D	L	GF	GA	GD	Pts	Promotion or relegation
1	Os	25	19	1	5	85	42	+43	58	Promotion to Second Division
2	Djerv 1919	25	17	5	3	67	31	+36	56	
3	Vard Haugesund	25	14	5	6	69	45	+24	47	
4	Fana	25	14	2	9	68	51	+17	44	
5	Askøy	25	12	7	6	43	35	+8	43	
6	Brann 2	25	11	7	7	58	46	+12	40	
7	Austevoll	25	10	7	8	49	56	−7	37	
8	Førde	25	9	4	12	47	58	−11	31	
9	Sogndal 2	25	9	3	13	64	57	+7	30	
10	Stord	25	7	9	9	53	65	−12	30	
11	Varegg	25	7	5	13	42	52	−10	26	
12	Åsane 2	25	6	7	12	45	60	−15	25	Relegation to Fourth Division
13	Gneist	25	5	3	17	43	76	−33	18	Relegation to Fourth Division
14	Fyllingsdalen (R)	25	1	3	21	21	80	−59	6	Relegation to Fourth Division

Updated to match(es) played on 26 October 2026. Source: NFF (in Norwegian)
Rules for classification: 1) Points; 2) Goal difference; 3) Goals scored; 4) Head-to-head points; 5) Head-to-head goal difference; 6) Head-to-head goals scored.
(R) Relegated

=== Group 4 ===
Pos	Team	Pld	W	D	L	GF	GA	GD	Pts	Promotion or relegation
1	Madla	22	13	6	3	57	27	+30	45	Promotion to Second Division
2	Mandalskameratene	22	13	4	5	54	33	+21	43	
3	Fløy	22	12	3	7	45	36	+9	39	
4	Vindbjart	22	12	2	8	50	26	+24	38	
5	Varhaug	22	10	6	6	41	34	+7	36	
6	Viking 2	22	9	5	8	52	33	+19	32	
7	Stabæk 2	22	9	3	10	47	49	−2	30	
8	Brodd	22	9	3	10	40	42	−2	30	
9	Våg	22	9	2	11	35	38	−3	29	
10	Staal Jørpeland	22	7	5	10	45	54	−9	26	
11	Odd 2	22	7	5	10	39	50	−11	26	
12	Hinna	22	6	5	11	42	63	−21	23	Relegation to Fourth Division
13	Haugesund 2	22	6	4	12	40	63	−23	22	Relegation to Fourth Division
14	Åkra	22	4	3	15	27	66	−39	15	Relegation to Fourth Division

Updated to match(es) played on 5 October 2026. Source: NFF (in Norwegian)
Rules for classification: 1) Points; 2) Goal difference; 3) Goals scored; 4) Head-to-head points; 5) Head-to-head goal difference; 6) Head-to-head goals scored.

=== Group 5 ===
Pos	Team	Pld	W	D	L	GF	GA	GD	Pts	Promotion or relegation
1	Fløya	26	18	3	5	81	36	+45	57	Promotion to Second Division
2	Skedsmo	26	18	2	6	64	37	+27	56	
3	Harstad	26	16	4	6	86	43	+43	52	
4	Alta	26	14	6	6	64	41	+23	48	
5	Finnsnes	26	12	4	10	49	46	+3	40	
6	Skjetten	26	12	3	11	63	57	+6	39	
7	Kongsvinger 2	26	12	2	12	58	72	−14	38	
8	Lillestrøm 2	26	11	1	14	83	62	+21	34	
9	Strømsgodset 2	26	10	3	13	62	59	+3	33	
10	Fauske/Sprint	26	9	4	13	64	98	−34	31	
11	Tromsø 2	26	8	6	12	53	46	+7	30	
12	Skjervøy	26	8	3	15	40	73	−33	27	Relegation to Fourth Division
13	Bossekop	26	6	4	16	48	89	−41	22	Relegation to Fourth Division
14	Ulfstind	26	4	3	19	41	97	−56	15	Relegation to Fourth Division

Updated to match(es) played on 1 November 2026. Source: NFF (in Norwegian)
Rules for classification: 1) Points; 2) Goal difference; 3) Goals scored; 4) Head-to-head points; 5) Head-to-head goal difference; 6) Head-to-head goals scored.

=== Group 6 ===
Pos	Team	Pld	W	D	L	GF	GA	GD	Pts	Promotion or relegation
1	Lillehammer	26	20	2	4	96	37	+59	62	Promotion to Second Division
2	Elverum	26	18	2	6	76	40	+36	56	
3	Råde	26	14	4	8	86	42	+44	46	
4	Gjøvik-Lyn	26	14	3	9	44	24	+20	45	
5	Drøbak-Frogn	26	12	6	8	56	36	+20	42	
6	Rælingen	26	12	5	9	56	60	−4	41	
7	Ørn Horten	26	11	6	9	46	39	+7	39	
8	Oppsal	26	12	3	11	44	38	+6	39	
9	Lyn 2	26	11	4	11	61	55	+6	37	
10	Sandefjord 2	26	11	3	12	62	62	0	36	
11	Sarpsborg 08 2	26	9	5	12	60	62	−2	32	
12	Fram Larvik	26	8	6	12	46	55	−9	30	Relegation to Fourth Division
13	Brumunddal (R)	26	3	3	20	28	114	−86	12	Relegation to Fourth Division
14	Bjørkelangen (R)	26	1	0	25	17	114	−97	3	Relegation to Fourth Division

Updated to match(es) played on 1 November 2026. Source: NFF (in Norwegian)
Rules for classification: 1) Points; 2) Goal difference; 3) Goals scored; 4) Head-to-head points; 5) Head-to-head goal difference; 6) Head-to-head goals scored.
(R) Relegated

== See also ==
- 2026 Eliteserien
- 2026 Norwegian First Division
- 2026 Norwegian Second Division
- 2025–26 Norwegian Football Cup
- 2026–27 Norwegian Football Cup
