= Sturla Mentzoni =

Norwegian footballer (born 1977)

Personal information
- Full name: Sturla Espolin Mentzoni (formerly Sturla Mentzoni Eilertsen)
- Date of birth: 1 March 1977 (age 49)
- Height: 1.81 m (5 ft 11 in)
- Position: Midfielder

Youth career
- Innstranden
- Bodø/Glimt

Senior career*
Years	Team	Apps	(Gls)
1996–1998	Bodø/Glimt	6	(0)
1999	Sarpsborg		
2000–2002	Innstranden		
2003–2004	Skeid	32	(3)

International career
1992	Norway U15	3	(1)
- * Club domestic league appearances and goals

Sturla Mentzoni (born 25 February 1977) is a retired Norwegian football midfielder.

He started his youth career in Innstrandens IL and was capped for Norway as a youth international. He made his Eliteserien debut for FK Bodø/Glimt in May 1996 against Kongsvinger. After three seasons he played for Sarpsborg FK before rejoining Innstranden, and finally getting another spell in the 1. divisjon for Skeid.
