= 2012 Norwegian First Division (women) =

1. divisjon
- Season: 2012
- Champions: Avaldsnes
- Promoted: Avaldsnes, Medkila
- Relegated: Alta
- Matches: 132
- Goals: 518 (3.92 per match)
- Biggest home win: Grand Bodø 10–0 Voss
- Biggest away win: Sola 1–8 Sarpsborg 08
- Highest scoring: Grand Bodø 10–0 Voss
- Longest winning run: 18 games - Avaldsnes
- Longest unbeaten run: 20 games - Avaldsnes
- Longest winless run: 12 games - Voss
- Longest losing run: 12 games - Voss
- Total attendance: 13,766
- Average attendance: 105

The 2012 1. divisjon (women) season kicked off on 14 April 2012, and ended on 28 October 2012.

2011-champions Vålerenga and runner-up Fart were promoted to the Toppserien at the end of the 2011 season. They were replaced by Medkila and Linderud-Grei. Haugar and Manglerud Star were relegated at the end of the 2011 season after finishing in the bottom two places of the table. They were replaced by the two playoff-winners Kongsvinger and Åsane.

== Outcome ==
At the end of the season the top team was to win promotion to Toppserien, the second team was to play off against the second from bottom team in Toppserien for promotion, while the bottom two teams were to be relegated to the 2. divisjon. In the event, Avaldsnes were champions and were promoted. Medkila came second, but lost the promotion playoff. However, the playoff winner, Kattem, subsequently withdrew their team, and Medkila were then promoted. Alta were offered the vacant place in the 2013 1. divisjon, but declined, opting for relegation. Voss were then offered the vacant place, and accepted it, thus avoiding relegation.

== League table ==
Locations of the teams in 1. Divisjon, 2012

Pos	Team	Pld	W	D	L	GF	GA	GD	Pts	Promotion, qualification or relegation
1	Avaldsnes (C, P)	22	20	1	1	73	20	+53	61	Promotion to Toppserien
2	Medkila (P)	22	15	4	3	48	15	+33	49	Qualification for the promotion play-offs
3	Sarpsborg 08	22	14	2	6	72	38	+34	44	
4	Kongsvinger	22	12	2	8	41	43	−2	38	
5	Grand Bodø	22	11	3	8	64	37	+27	36	
6	Fløya	22	11	1	10	44	37	+7	34	
7	Åsane	22	8	4	10	33	36	−3	28	
8	Linderud-Grei	22	8	3	11	35	48	−13	27	
9	Fortuna	22	7	3	12	35	54	−19	24	
10	Sola	22	5	5	12	42	67	−25	20	
11	Alta (R)	22	4	1	17	23	63	−40	13	Relegation to Second Division
12	Voss	22	2	1	19	9	60	−51	7	

Source: nifs.no
Rules for classification: 1) points; 2) goal difference; 3) number of goals scored.
(C) Champions; (P) Promoted; (R) Relegated

=== Promotion play-offs ===
Medkila faced Kattem, who finished second last in Toppserien, in a two-legged play-off match for the right to play in the 2013 Toppserien. Kattem won the playoff, but subsequently withdrew their team from the league. Medkila were promoted to take their place in Toppserien.

14 November 2012
18:00

Kattem	3 – 0	Medkila

Nissekollen, Trondheim
17 November 2012
11:30

Medkila	3 – 2	Kattem

Harstad Stadion, Harstad

== See also ==
- 2012 in Norwegian football
- 2012 Toppserien
