= Ibba Laajab =

Footballer (born 1985)

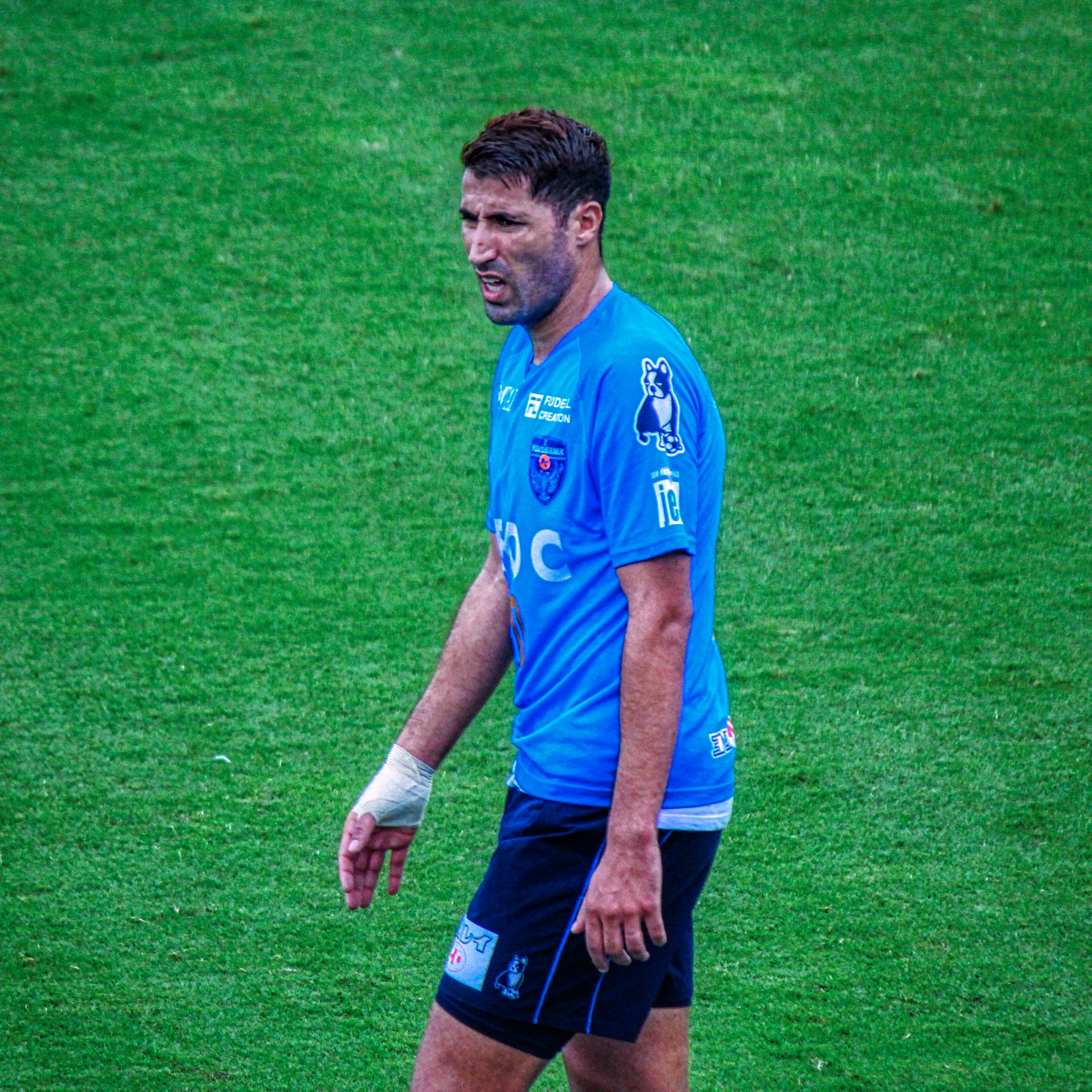
- Laajab in 2018

Personal information
- Full name: Abdurahim Laajab
- Date of birth: 21 May 1985 (age 41)
- Place of birth: Morocco
- Height: 1.88 m (6 ft 2 in)
- Positions: Winger; striker

Youth career
- Vålerenga
- –2002: Moss

Senior career*
Years	Team	Apps	(Gls)
2003–2005	Skeid	18	(2)
2005	→ Drøbak/Frogn (loan)		
2006	Sørumsand	0	(0)
2006–2007	Borussia Mönchengladbach II	1	(0)
2007	Skeid	16	(1)
2008–2009	Notodden	43	(10)
2010	Mjøndalen	27	(9)
2011	Strømmen	24	(7)
2012	Vålerenga	6	(0)
2012	→ Stabæk (loan)	5	(0)
2013–2014	Bodø/Glimt	56	(30)
2015	Hebei China Fortune	30	(8)
2016–2020	Yokohama FC	158	(78)
2020–2022	Omiya Ardija	35	(4)
2022–2024	Lyn	35	(15)

International career
2011–2015	Norway (futsal)	20	(19)
- * Club domestic league appearances and goals as of 31 July 2024

Abdurahim Laajab (born 21 May 1985), commonly known as Ibba Laajab (イバ), is a Norwegian former professional footballer. Ibba also plays futsal. Born in Morocco, he holds Norwegian citizenship and is one of the key players in the Norway futsal team.

Laajab grew up in Norway and played eight seasons in the Norwegian First Division with Skeid, Notodden, Mjøndalen, and Strømmen before he signed with Tippeligaen-side Vålerenga in 2012. After spending the second half of the 2012 season on loan with Stabæk, Ibba joined Bodø/Glimt ahead of the 2013 season.

After two campaigns with the Norwegian side, he got a transfer to Chinese League One side Hebei China Fortune. After a year there, he moved to the J2 League side Yokohama FC in 2016 where he stayed for four years.

== Football career ==
Ibba was born to Moroccan parents and moved to Norway when he was one month old. He played at Vålerenga and Moss during his youth, and later joined Skeid because his friends were playing there. At Skeid he was teammate with Moa, Mos, Birger Madsen, and Dawda Leigh.

Ibba didn't get too much playing time with Skeid, but during the second half of the 2004 season, he played 248 minutes in nine matches in the First Division and scored two goals. Ahead of the 2005-season, Ibba and his teammate Moa joined Rosenborg BK on their pre-season tour to La Manga Club. Ibba was sent on a short loan-spell to Drøbak-Frogn in 2005, and left Skeid after the season and signed a one-year contract with Sørumsand which had been relegated from the Third Division.

Before he played a match for Sørumsand, Ibba moved to Borussia Mönchengladbach where Jørn Andersen was the assistant coach. Ibba and Andersen communicated with each other in Norwegian. A year later, Andersen was fired together with the head coach, and the new coach only talked to Ibba in German, a language Ibba did not try to learn, and eventually Ibba requested to terminate his contract and moved home to Norway. He only played one match for Borussia Mönchengladbach II.

In 2007, Ibba was back in Skeid, before he signed a contract with Notodden ahead of the 2008-season. Ibba played regularly in the first-team until head coach Jan Halvor Halvorsen was fired halfway through the 2009-season. The new coach, Arne Sandstø, placed him on the bench, and Ibba left the club after the season. Ahead of the 2010-season, Ibba was on a trial with the Spanish second-tier club Elche and was offered a contract there, but Ibba rejected the offer and decided to move to Mjøndalen instead. Mjøndalen's coach Vegard Hansen stated that Ibba was a risky signing due to his poor reputation, but that the 24-year had such an unredeemed potential that he couldn't ignore him.

Ibba played for Strømmen in 2011, where he scored seven goals in 24 matches in the First Division, and ahead of the 2012-season he signed for Vålerenga. After Ibba's transfer to Vålerenga, his former teammate from Skeid and former Vålerenga-player, Moa, said in an interview with Norwegian TV2 that the supporters of Vålerenga should be excited about their new signing and dubbed Ibba as one of the best newcomers of the 2012 Tippeligaen. Ibba made his first-team debut for Vålerenga in the friendly match against the Second Division-side Nesodden on 11 January 2012. After playing six matches for Vålerenga in Tippeligaen, Ibba was loaned out to Stabæk in August 2012 for the rest of the season.

Ibba joined Bodø/Glimt ahead of the 2013 season, where he was reunited with his coach from Notodden, Jan Halvor Halvorsen. Ibba signed a three-year contract with Bodø/Glimt.

On 25 February 2015, Ibba transferred to China League One side Hebei China Fortune.

On 25 August 2022, he signed for Lyn. On 11 November 2023 he scored his first hat-trick for Lyn, coming off the bench and scoring three goals in 20 minutes in a 10-1 win against Fram Larvik.

== Futsal career ==
Ibba is known as one of the biggest futsal-stars in Norway. In his debut for the Norwegian futsal team, he scored three goals when Norway won 7–2 against Malta on 13 January 2011. The next day he again scored three goals against Malta, before he scored another hat-trick when Norway won against Israel in the qualifying match for the 2012 UEFA Futsal Championship on 20 January, which made a total of nine goals in his first three matches for Norway.

Ahead of the qualifying match against Spain on 15 December 2011, Norway's national team coach Esten O. Sæther called Ibba a "top international futsal player", and that if their chances against Spain was depending on Ibba's performance and that he had to play at his very best. Three days later, Ibba scored the goal that secured a 3–3 draw against Belgium and sent Norway to the playoff round of the 2012 FIFA Futsal World Cup qualifier.

== Style of play ==
Laajab has an athletic physique, temperament, one-on-one skills, and he has a breakthrough force.

== Career statistics ==
As of match played 23 June 2024

Appearances and goals by club, season and competition
Club	Season	League			National Cup		Total	
Club	Season	Division	Apps	Goals	Apps	Goals	Apps	Goals
Skeid	2003	1. divisjon	1	0	0	0	1	0
Skeid	2004	1. divisjon	9	2	0	0	9	2
Skeid	2005	1. divisjon	8	0	0	0	8	0
Skeid	Total		18	2	0	0	18	2
Skeid	2007	1. divisjon	16	1	1	0	17	1
Notodden	2008	1. divisjon	24	8	0	0	24	8
Notodden	2009	1. divisjon	19	2	1	0	20	2
Notodden	Total		43	10	1	0	44	10
Mjøndalen	2010	1. divisjon	27	9	3	1	30	10
Strømmen	2011	1. divisjon	24	7	2	1	26	8
Vålerenga	2012	Eliteserien	6	0	2	1	8	1
Stabæk (loan)	2012	Eliteserien	5	0	0	0	5	0
Bodø/Glimt	2013	1. divisjon	26	17	3	2	29	19
Bodø/Glimt	2014	Eliteserien	30	13	3	0	33	13
Bodø/Glimt	Total		56	30	6	2	62	32
Hebei China Fortune	2015	China League One	30	8	1	0	31	8
Yokohama	2016	J2 League	40	18	1	1	41	19
Yokohama	2017	J2 League	41	25	0	0	41	25
Yokohama	2018	J2 League	40	17	0	0	40	17
Yokohama	2019	J2 League	36	18	0	0	36	18
Yokohama	2020	J1 League	1	0	2	0	3	0
Yokohama	Total		158	78	3	1	161	79
Omiya Ardija	2020	J2 League	13	1	0	0	13	1
Omiya Ardija	2021	J2 League	22	3	0	0	22	3
Omiya Ardija	Total		35	4	0	0	35	4
Lyn	2022	3. divisjon	9	5	0	0	9	5
Lyn	2023	2. divisjon	16	9	2	0	18	9
Lyn	2024	1. divisjon	10	1	2	0	12	1
Lyn	Total		35	15	4	0	39	15
Career total			434	158	21	6	463	164
