= Rana FK =

Norwegian football club

- Full name: Rana Fotballklubb
- Founded: 4 December 2017 (8 years ago)
- Ground: Sagbakken Stadion, Mo i Rana
- Head coach: Stian Theting
- League: 2. divisjon
- 2025: 2. divisjon, group 2, 9th of 14
- Website: http://www.ranafk.no/
Home colours	Away colours

Rana Fotballklubb is a Norwegian association football club located in Mo i Rana, Nordland. The club was founded 4 December 2017 as a merger of Mo IL and the football section of IL Stålkameratene. The team currently plays in 2. divisjon, the third tier of the Norwegian football league system.

== History ==
Although the merger was agreed 29 November 2017, Mo and Stålkameratene would continue to field their own tems in the 2018 season, as the merger would not effect before the 2019 season. Rana therefore played their first season in the 2019 4. divisjon. They won 15 out of their 16 games and were promoted to the 3. divisjon.

=== Recent seasons ===
Season		Pos.	Pl.	W	D	L	GS	GA	P	Cup	Notes
2019	4. divisjon	↑ 1	16	15	1	0	72	15	46	2nd qual. round	Promoted
2020	3. divisjon	Season cancelled									
2021	3. divisjon	8	13	6	1	6	23	30	19	1st round	
2022	3. divisjon	7	26	12	1	13	59	64	37	1st round	
2023	3. divisjon	3	26	20	1	5	79	30	61	1st round	
2024	3. divisjon	↑ 1	26	20	2	4	81	29	62	1st round	Promoted
2025	2. divisjon	9	26	10	3	13	34	42	33	3rd round	
2026	2. divisjon	10	26	10	3	13	40	48	33	1st round	
