= FK Union Carl Berner =

Norwegian sports club

- Full name: Fotballklubben Union Carl Berner
- Founded: 9 November 2008
- Ground: Rommensletta, Oslo
- League: Fourth Division
- 2025: 1st (Oslo II) (promoted)

Fotballklubben Union Carl Berner is an association football club from Grünerløkka, Oslo, Norway.

The club was founded as FK Fremad Famagusta in 2008 as a team for people from the Lillehammer region residing in Oslo. Mirroring the old team FK Fremad from Lillehammer, the "Famagusta" moniker was also added to honour Anorthosis Famagusta. Chess champion Magnus Carlsen notably played for the team as a hobby.

Fremad Famagusta experienced several promotions and managed to reach the Fourth Division, but withered during the COVID-19 pandemic in Norway when, among others, the entire 2020 season was annulled below the Second Division. Contesting the 2021 Fourth Division, the team decided to fold. The club was however resurrected under a new identity, Union Carl Berner. The name is inspired by Union Berlin and the geographical area around Carl Berners plass, but also the pub Carls co-owned by Union Carl Berner chairman, former agent Lars Petter Fosdahl.

Winning repromotion to the 2023 Fourth Division, Union Carl Berner promptly constructed a rivalry with Grüner IL, the respective clubs representing different parts of Grünerløkka borough. The rivalry was dubbed "Bydel Classico". In 2024, Union Carl Berner reached the first round of the Norwegian Football Cup for the first time. Facing Vålerenga, they opted to play at Vålerenga's historical home ground Jordal Idrettspark. In 2025, Union Carl Berner won promotion to the 2026 Third Division for the first time.
