= Halsnøy IL =

Norwegian sports club

- Full name: Halsnøy Idrettslag
- Short name: Halsnøy IL
- Founded: 14 June 1940
- Ground: Nya Myro, Halsnøya
- Capacity: 500
- Coordinates: 59°47′39″N 5°42′22″E
- Coaches: Atle Eide; Ingvar Hølland; Jan Helland
- League: Fifth Division
Home colours	Away colours

Halsnøy IL is a Norwegian sports club from Halsnøya in Kvinnherad Municipality, founded in June 1940. It has sections for football, volleyball and swimming.

The men's football team play their matches at Nya Myro gressbane, and is currently playing in the Fifth Division, the sixth tier of Norwegian football.

== History ==
The club was formed on 14 June 1940 by local football enthusiasts. Prior to 1940, there had been several minor clubs on the island, one for each village, but none of them properly organized. In the mid-60s, the club registered for official league football and have been playing in the Norwegian football league system ever since. The club played in the Third Division (fourth tier) from 2003 to 2005, their highest achievement. The club also participated in the qualifying rounds for the Norwegian Football Cup, where they in 2004 eliminated Follese in the first qualifying round before they were beaten by Solid in the next round. The next year Halsnøy lost against Hald in the first qualifying. After their relegation in 2005, the club has seen hard times, with a lack of players, which eventually led to their relegation to the Sixth Division in 2007. The club later won promotion to the Fifth Division where they are currently playing.

=== Facilities ===
Until the 1980s, Halsnøy played their home games on the local football ground "Myro" (literally: the mire), which was a large field that was used as farmland for sheep during the off-season. After the Football Association of Norway set higher demands for club stadiums, the field was dug up, drained, and replanted with new soil, as well as adding permanent stadium seating and track-and-field sections, making it suitable for several sports. The new stadium, "Nya Myro" (literally:the new mire), was named in honour of the old ground, and opened in 1988.

In addition to their main stadium, Halsnøy IL owns and operates a smaller ground in Eidsvik on Halsnøy, which features a full-size artificial pitch, training facilities, and some seating. It is commonly used for training, as well as home games during the winter, when the "Nya Myro" is frozen or otherwise affected by harsh weather.
