= Flisa IL =

Norwegian sports club

Flisa AIL
- Full name: Flisa Allianseidrettslag
- Founded: 14 December 1913
- Ground: SolørRadioen Arena, Flisa
- League: Fourth Division
- 2025: Fourth Division group IØ, 6th of 14
Home colours

Flisa Allianseidrettslag is a multi-sports club based in the village of Flisa in Åsnes Municipality, Norway.

It has sections for football (soccer) and team handball, and was founded in 1913.

The men's football team played in the Third Division, among others with a lengthy stint from 2005 to 2017. They won their section in both 2008 and 2009, and both times wound up in promotion playoffs. The team lost 2–3 on aggregate both times; first to FF Lillehammer and the second time to Brumunddal.

== Recent seasons ==
Season		Pos.	Pl.	W	D	L	GS	GA	P	Cup	Notes
2016	3. divisjon	2	26	17	5	4	67	31	36	1st round	
2017	3. divisjon	↓ 12	26	6	3	17	32	76	21	1st round	Relegated
2018	4. divisjon	9	22	5	3	14	25	66	18	1st qual. round	
2019	4. divisjon	↓ 12	22	3	3	16	19	61	12		Relegated
2020	5. divisjon	Cancelled									
2021	5. divisjon	1	10	9	0	1	27	10	27		
2022	5. divisjon	↑ 1	20	18	1	1	99	22	55		Promoted
2023	4. divisjon	12	26	7	4	15	36	61	25	1st qual. round	
2024	4. divisjon	11	26	7	6	13	52	68	27	2nd qual. round	
2025	4. divisjon	6	26	10	5	11	59	65	35	1st qual. round	
2026	4. divisjon										
