= Emma Stølen Godø =

Norwegian footballer (born 2000)

Personal information
- Date of birth: 31 May 2000 (age 26)
- Height: 1.78 m (5 ft 10 in)
- Position: Midfielder

Team information
- Current team: Juventus
- Number: 17

Youth career
- Midsund

Senior career*
Years	Team	Apps	(Gls)
2015–2019	Molde	42	(27)
2019–2021	Lyn	44	(8)
2022–2023	LSK Kvinner	48	(17)
2024–2025	Vålerenga	18	(5)
2025–	Juventus	27	(5)

International career^{‡}
2021–2024	Norway U23	18	(4)
2023–	Norway	5	(0)
- * Club domestic league appearances and goals as of 12 November 2026 ‡ National team caps and goals as of 12 November 2026

Emma Stølen Godø (born 31 May 2000) is a Norwegian professional footballer who plays as a midfielder or forward for Serie A club Juventus and the Norway national team.

== Club career ==
After playing youth football in Midsund IL, Godø moved on to Molde in 2015. After several seasons in the Second Division with Molde, she signed in August 2019 for Lyn in the Toppserien.

In November 2021, it was announced that Godø had signed with LSK Kvinner. During her time at LSK, Godø developed into one of the top midfielders in the league. In 2023, LSK secured a third-place finish in the Toppserien, and Godø was named Midfielder of the Year for her outstanding performances that season.

On 11 December 2023, it was announced that Godø had signed a contract with reigning Toppserien champions Vålerenga, lasting until the summer of 2025. In 2024, she contributed to Vålerenga winning both the Toppserien and the Norwegian Women's Cup, as well as helping the club reach the group stage of the UEFA Women's Champions League for the first time in its history.

On 3 February 2025, it was announced that Godø had joined Juventus from Vålerenga for an undisclosed fee. She made her debut with Juventus in the semi-final of the Coppa Italia on 6 March 2025, scoring the winning goal in the match against Fiorentina. Her first Serie A goal came in a match against Roma in round 24 of the 2024–25 season.

== International career ==
Godø has played matches for the U23 and senior team. October 2022, she was called up to the Norwegian senior team for the first time. She made her debut for them against Uruguay on 15 February 2023, where she came on in the 66th minute for Frida Leonhardsen Maanum.

On 19 June 2023, although Godø was not included in the squad for the 2023 World Cup, she was named as a reserve player.

== Career statistics ==
=== Club ===
As of match played 18 October 2026

Appearances and goals by club, season and competition
Club	Season	League	League		National Cup (Note: Includes Norwegian Women's Cup and Coppa Italia.)		League Cup (Note: Includes Serie A Women's Cup.)		Continental (Note: Includes UEFA Women's Champions League.)		Other (Note: Includes Supercoppa Italiana and appearances in Toppserien relegation play-offs.)		Total	
Club	Season	League	Apps	Goals	Apps	Goals	Apps	Goals	Apps	Goals	Apps	Goals	Apps	Goals
Molde	2015	Second Division	2	1	—	—	—	—	—	—	—	—	2	1
Molde	2016	Second Division	3	1	1	0	—	—	—	—	—	—	4	1
Molde	2017	Second Division	13	7	1	0	—	—	—	—	—	—	14	7
Molde	2018	Second Division	15	10	2	0	—	—	—	—	—	—	17	10
Molde	2019	Second Division	9	8	1	0	—	—	—	—	—	—	10	8
Lyn	2019	Toppserien	8	0	—	—	—	—	—	—	2	1	10	1
Lyn	2020	Toppserien	18	4	1	1	—	—	—	—	—	—	19	5
Lyn	2021	Toppserien	18	1	1	1	—	—	—	—	2	0	21	2
LSK Kvinner	2022	Toppserien	24	9	2	1	—	—	—	—	—	—	26	10
LSK Kvinner	2023	Toppserien	24	8	4	2	—	—	—	—	—	—	28	10
Vålerenga	2024	Toppserien	18	5	5	2	—	—	9	0	—	—	32	7
Juventus	2024–25	Serie A	7	2	2	1	—	—	—	—	—	—	9	3
Juventus	2025–26	Serie A	17	2	5	—	5	1	8	1	1	—	38	4
Juventus	2026–27	Serie A	3	1	—	—	5	0	5	1	-	—	13	2
Career total			179	59	25	8	10	1	22	2	5	1	243	71

=== International ===
As of match played 5 June 2026

National team	Year	Apps	Goals
Norway	2023	2	0
Norway	2025	2	0
Norway	2026	1	0
Total	—	5	0

== Honours ==
Vålerenga

- Toppserien: 2024
- Norwegian Women's Cup: 2024

Juventus FC

- Serie A: 2024–25
- Coppa Italia: 2024–25; runner-up: 2025–26
- Serie A Women's Cup: 2025, 2026
- Supercoppa Italiana: 2025

Individual

- Toppserien Midfielder of the Year: 2023
