= Aram Khalili =

Iranian Kurdish footballer (born 1989)

Personal information
- Date of birth: 28 July 1989 (age 37)
- Place of birth: Bukan, Iran
- Height: 1.88 m (6 ft 2 in)
- Position: Striker

Youth career
- 1999–2006: Start

Senior career*
Years	Team	Apps	(Gls)
2006–2011	Start	33	(10)
2009	→ Bryne (loan)	6	(2)
2010	→ GAIS (loan)	20	(2)
2011–2012	Bodø/Glimt	47	(15)
2012	→ Notodden (loan)	10	(3)
2013–2017	Bryne	129	(47)
2018–2019	FK Jerv	27	(8)
2020–2021	Innstranden	4	(0)

International career^{‡}
2007–2009	Norway U21	10	(3)

Managerial career
- 2020–: Innstranden (player-manager)
- * Club domestic league appearances and goals as of 17 August 2019 ‡ National team caps and goals as of 18 September 2008

Aram Khalili (Persian: آرام خلیلی; born 28 July 1989) is a former Iranian professional footballer who plays as a striker. He has represented the Norway U21 team.

== Early life ==
Born in Bukan, Khalili is of Kurdish descent. He and his family emigrated to Kristiansand in 1997.

== Club career ==
Khalili joined the Start youth system in 1999. He made his debut for Start in 2006, and made his breakthrough to the first team in 2008. In January 2011 he signed for Bodø/Glimt. In 2020 Khalili signed a deal with 4. division side Innstranden to become player-manager of the club.

== International career ==
Khalili has also been capped for Norway U21, but later he was not called up to the Norway senior team. He is eligible to play for the Iran national team.

== Career statistics ==
As of 17 August 2019

Appearances and goals by club, season and competition
Season	Club	Division	League		Cup		Total	
Season	Club	Division	Apps	Goals	Apps	Goals	Apps	Goals
Start	2006	Tippeligaen	1	0	0	0	1	0
Start	2007	Tippeligaen	1	0	1	0	2	0
Start	2008	1. divisjon	25	9	1	2	26	11
Start	2009	Tippeligaen	6	1	2	0	8	1
Start	Total		33	10	4	2	37	12
Bryne (loan)	2009	1. divisjon	6	2	3	0	9	2
GAIS (loan)	2010	Allsvenskan	20	2	1	0	21	2
Bodø/Glimt	2011	1. divisjon	30	12	3	1	33	13
Bodø/Glimt	2012	1. divisjon	17	3	4	1	21	4
Bodø/Glimt	Total		47	15	7	2	54	17
Notodden (loan)	2012	1. divisjon	10	3	0	0	10	3
Bryne	2013	1. divisjon	29	17	3	2	32	19
Bryne	2014	1. divisjon	27	10	1	2	28	12
Bryne	2015	1. divisjon	24	3	3	1	27	4
Bryne	2016	1. divisjon	26	6	2	0	28	6
Bryne	2017	2. divisjon	23	11	2	2	25	13
Bryne	Total		129	47	11	7	140	54
Jerv	2018	1. divisjon	23	8	1	0	24	8
Jerv	2019	1. divisjon	4	0	0	0	4	0
Jerv	Total		22	8	1	0	28	8
Innstranden	2020	4. divisjon	0	0	0	0	0	0
Career total			272	87	27	11	299	98
