= Stian Theting =

Norwegian footballer (born 1976)

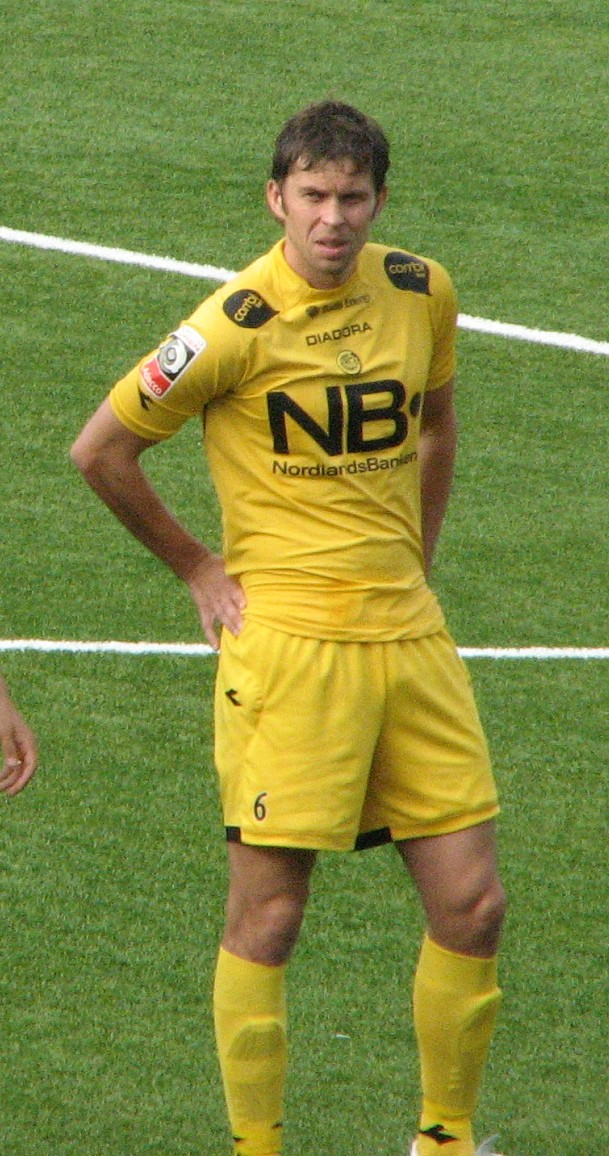

Personal information
- Date of birth: 21 October 1976 (age 50)
- Place of birth: Sandnessjøen, Norway
- Height: 1.85 m (6 ft 1 in)
- Position: Midfielder

Senior career*
Years	Team	Apps	(Gls)
1993–1998	Sandnessjøen	106	(42)
1998–2001	Kjelsås	86	(14)
2002–2004	Skeid	71	(20)
2004–2009	Bodø/Glimt	103	(12)
2010–2018	Sandnessjøen	146	(62)

Managerial career
- 2014–2022: Sandnessjøen
- 2024–2026: Bodø/Glimt (women)
- 2026–: Rana
- * Club domestic league appearances and goals as of 2 May 2017

Stian Lyngheim Theting (born 21 October 1976) is a former Norwegian football defender/midfielder.

He joined FK Bodø/Glimt in 2004 from Skeid, and stayed there even after their relegation from the 2005 Norwegian Premier League. In 2010, he and Bodø/Glimt agreed to quit the contract. He now plays for Sandnessjøen IL.

== Career statistics ==
As of 2 May 2017

Season	Club	Division	League		Cup		Total	
Season	Club	Division	Apps	Goals	Apps	Goals	Apps	Goals
2004	Bodø/Glimt	Tippeligaen	10	0	0	0	10	0
2005	Bodø/Glimt	Tippeligaen	16	2	3	0	19	2
2006	Bodø/Glimt	Adeccoligaen	17	3	0	0	17	3
2007	Bodø/Glimt	Adeccoligaen	25	7	2	0	27	7
2008	Bodø/Glimt	Tippeligaen	14	0	4	0	18	0
2009	Bodø/Glimt	Tippeligaen	21	0	2	0	23	0
2010	Sandnessjøen	3. divisjon	22	8	0	0	22	8
2011	Sandnessjøen	3. divisjon	22	14	0	0	22	14
2012	Sandnessjøen	3. divisjon	22	14	0	0	22	14
2013	Sandnessjøen	3. divisjon	20	6	1	1	21	7
2014	Sandnessjøen	3. divisjon	18	5	3	1	21	6
2015	Sandnessjøen	3. divisjon	19	7	3	1	22	8
2016	Sandnessjøen	3. divisjon	22	7	3	2	25	9
2017	Sandnessjøen	4. Divisjon	1	1	1	0	2	1
Career Total			249	73	22	5	271	78
