= Mobi Okoli =

Nigerian footballer

Personal information
- Full name: Mobi Okoli
- Date of birth: 4 February 1987 (age 39)
- Place of birth: Nigeria
- Height: 1.90 m (6 ft 3 in)
- Position: Right midfielder

Team information
- Current team: Bryne
- Number: 5

Senior career*
Years	Team	Apps	(Gls)
2010–2012	Sandnes Ulf	44	(2)
2012–	Bryne	2	(0)
- * Club domestic league appearances and goals as of 17 October 2012

Mobi Okoli (born 4 February 1987) is a Nigerian footballer playing for Bryne. He has previously played for Sandnes Ulf, and played two matches in Tippeligaen in 2012, the highest division in the Norwegian football league system.

He joined Sandnes Ulf in 2010. He made his debut in Tippeligaen on 28 April 2012, in the match against Fredrikstad, when he replaced Anel Raskaj in the 83rd minute.

Okoli joined Bryne on 31 August 2012.

== Career statistics ==
As of 17 October 2012

Season	Club	Division	League		Cup		Total	
Season	Club	Division	Apps	Goals	Apps	Goals	Apps	Goals
2010	Sandnes Ulf	Adeccoligaen	17	0	1	0	18	0
2011	Sandnes Ulf	Adeccoligaen	25	2	1	0	26	2
2012	Sandnes Ulf	Tippeligaen	2	0	1	0	3	0
2012	Bryne	Adeccoligaen	2	0	0	0	2	0
Career Total			46	2	3	0	49	2
