= Gronlid =

Gronlid or Grønlid may refer to:

== People ==
- Sanna Grønlid (born 1959), Norwegian biathlete

== Places ==
- Gronlid, Saskatchewan, Canada

== See also ==
- Grønli
