= Martin Dimov (footballer, born 1984) =

Bulgarian footballer

Personal information
- Full name: Martin Hristov Dimov
- Date of birth: 5 October 1984 (age 42)
- Place of birth: Varna, Bulgaria
- Height: 1.83 m (6 ft 0 in)
- Positions: Left back; left winger

Team information
- Current team: Sandnessjøen IL
- Number: 5

Youth career
- Cherno More

Senior career*
Years	Team	Apps	(Gls)
2003–2004	FC Beloslav	25	(12)
2004	Chernomorets Balchik	15	(10)
2005	FC Devnya	5	(1)
2005–2007	Chernomorets Sofia	58	(14)
2007	Balkan Botevgrad	16	(0)
2008–2010	Spartak Varna	19	(0)
2010–2011	Etar 1924	18	(0)
2011	Svetkavitsa	1	(0)
2011–2012	Suvorovo	20	(2)
2012–2013	Spartak Varna	11	(0)
2013–	Sandnessjøen IL	93	(19)
Total		282	(57)
- * Club domestic league appearances and goals as of 28 August 2014

Martin Hristov Dimov (Bulgarian: Мартин Димов; born 5 October 1984) is a Bulgarian footballer . In 2013, he moved to northern Norway to play for the amateur team Sandnessjøen IL.
