= Siri Nordeide Grønli =

Norwegian footballer (born 1984)

Personal information
- Full name: Siri Merete Nordeide Grønli
- Date of birth: 17 April 1984 (age 42)
- Place of birth: Høyanger, Norway
- Position: Defender

Team information
- Current team: Stabæk
- Number: 13

Youth career
- Høyang

Senior career*
Years	Team	Apps	(Gls)
2000–2008	Asker		
2009–	Stabæk	242	(5)

International career^{‡}
2009–2010	Norway	4	(0)
- * Club domestic league appearances and goals ‡ National team caps and goals as of 21 September 2014

Siri Merete Nordeide Grønli (born 17 April 1984) is a Norwegian football defender, the daughter of a football trainer. She played for IL Høyang before starting school at NTG Bærum (a specialist sports school near Oslo) and joining Asker SK as a 16-year-old. She was an Asker player from 2000 to 2008 until joining Stabæk Fotball Kvinner (SFK) at the beginning of 2009 with most of Asker's first team. 2012 was her 13th season in the Norwegian elite league, the Toppserien, except for a season in which Asker were demoted (2006).

She played for the Norway Under-23 team in 2007 as a vice-captain. In April 2009 she joined Norway's senior team for a visit to England for a training match. In 2010 Stabæk won the Toppserien title, qualifying to play in the UEFA Women's Champions League in 2011. Stabæk again qualified for the Champions league at the end of 2011. Also in 2011 Stabæk won the Norwegian Cup Final on penalties after extra time, with Nordeide Grønli kicking the winning goal. The match can be seen on NRK web-TV.

She has two younger sisters Line (b. 1988) and Gry (b. 1990) who also play in the Toppserien, for different clubs.
