= FK Arendal =

Norwegian football club

- Full name: Fotballklubben Arendal
- Founded: 29 May 2000
- Dissolved: 2 June 2008
- Ground: Lunderød stadion, Arendal
- Capacity: 3,000
Home colours	Away colours

FK Arendal is a defunct Norwegian football club from Arendal which existed from 2000 to 2008. At its peak it played in the third tier of the Norwegian league system. After its bankruptcy, a new, unrelated club called Arendal Fotball was started.

== History ==
FK Arendal was founded in 2000 as an umbrella team for the local clubs Arendal BK, FK Favør, IK Grane, Rygene IL, IL Sørfjell, IF Trauma, Øyestad IF and Hisøy IL. FK Arendal replaced Øyestad in the league system from the 2001 season. All the founding clubs still existed, however, and played in the league system – although Favør only had a women's section.

FK Arendal won promotion to the Second Division following a victorious 2003 season. Although relegated after one season, it was promoted back up for the 2007 season. The club was again relegated after only one season.

In 2008 it went bankrupt, and ceased to exist.

== Season by season record ==
Season	League									Cup	Top goalscorer	
Season	Division	P	W	D	L	F	A	Pts	Pos	Cup	Name	Goals
2001	3rd Division	22	10	6	6	46	38	36	4th	QR2	Svein Olaf Olsbu	12
2002	3rd Division	22	17	2	3	84	31	53	1st	R1	Kevin Svenningsen	26
2003	3rd Division	22	16	4	2	91	23	52	1st	R1	Svein Olaf Olsbu	34
2004	2nd Division	26	6	3	17	31	67	21	13th	R1	Kevin Svenningsen	10
2005	3rd Division	20	11	3	6	57	31	36	5th	QR1	Thomas Leveraas Johansen	11
2006	3rd Division	22	15	3	4	80	30	48	1st	R1	Kevin Svenningsen	26
2007	2nd Division	26	6	4	16	29	55	22	14th	R2	Armin Sistek	11
2008	3rd Division	7	4	1	2	24	13	13	DQ	R1	Svein Olaf Olsbu	11

Champions	Runners-up	Promoted	Relegated

- P = Played
- W = Games won
- D = Games drawn
- L = Games lost
- F = Goals for
- A = Goals against
- Pts = Points
- Pos = Final position
- DQ = Disqualified
- QR1 = First Qualifying Round
- QR2 = Second Qualifying Round
- R1 = Round 1
- R2 = Round 2
- R3 = Round 3
- R4 = Round 4
- R5 = Round 5
- R6 = Round 6
- QF = Quarter-finals
- SF = Semi-finals
- RU = Runners-up
- W = Winners
