= Midsund IL =

Norwegian football club

- Full name: Midsund Idrettslag
- Founded: 23 June 1946
- Ground: Midsund stadion, Midsund
- League: Fourth Division
- 2023: 3rd

Midsund Idrettslag is a Norwegian multi-sports club from Midsund in Molde Municipality in Møre og Romsdal. It has sections for association football, team handball, road cycling and track and field.

The club was founded on 23 June 1946 with sections for football and handball. However, the initial buildup of sports activities was slow, and the area was dominated by neighboring club Gossen IL. In 1971, however, Midsund IL fielded its first senior team, reaching a heyday in the late 1980s.

The men's football team plays in the Fourth Division, the fifth tier of Norwegian football. The team has had several stints in the Third Division, the longest in recent history being from 2000 to 2003 and 2005 to 2007.

Norway international Emma Stølen Godø started her career in Midsund.
