= Lokomotiv Oslo FK =

Association football club in Norway

- Full name: Lokomotiv Oslo Fotballklubb
- Nickname
- Founded: 1999; 27 years ago
- Ground: Tørteberg Kunstgress
- League: 3. divisjon
- 2024: 3. divisjon group 5; 6th of 14
- Website: https://www.lokomotivoslo.no/index.php?res=820&width=1440

Lokomotiv Oslo Fotballklubb is a Norwegian football club based in Oslo. It currently plays in the Norwegian Third Division, the fourth tier of Norwegian football.

== History ==
The club was founded on 26 September 1998. It has played in the Norwegian Third Division since 2014. In 2021, the club finished as runners-up in group 6 of the Third Division, its highest league finish to date. It plays its home matches at Tørteberg Kunstgress.
