= Elias Valderhaug =

Norwegian footballer (born 1990)

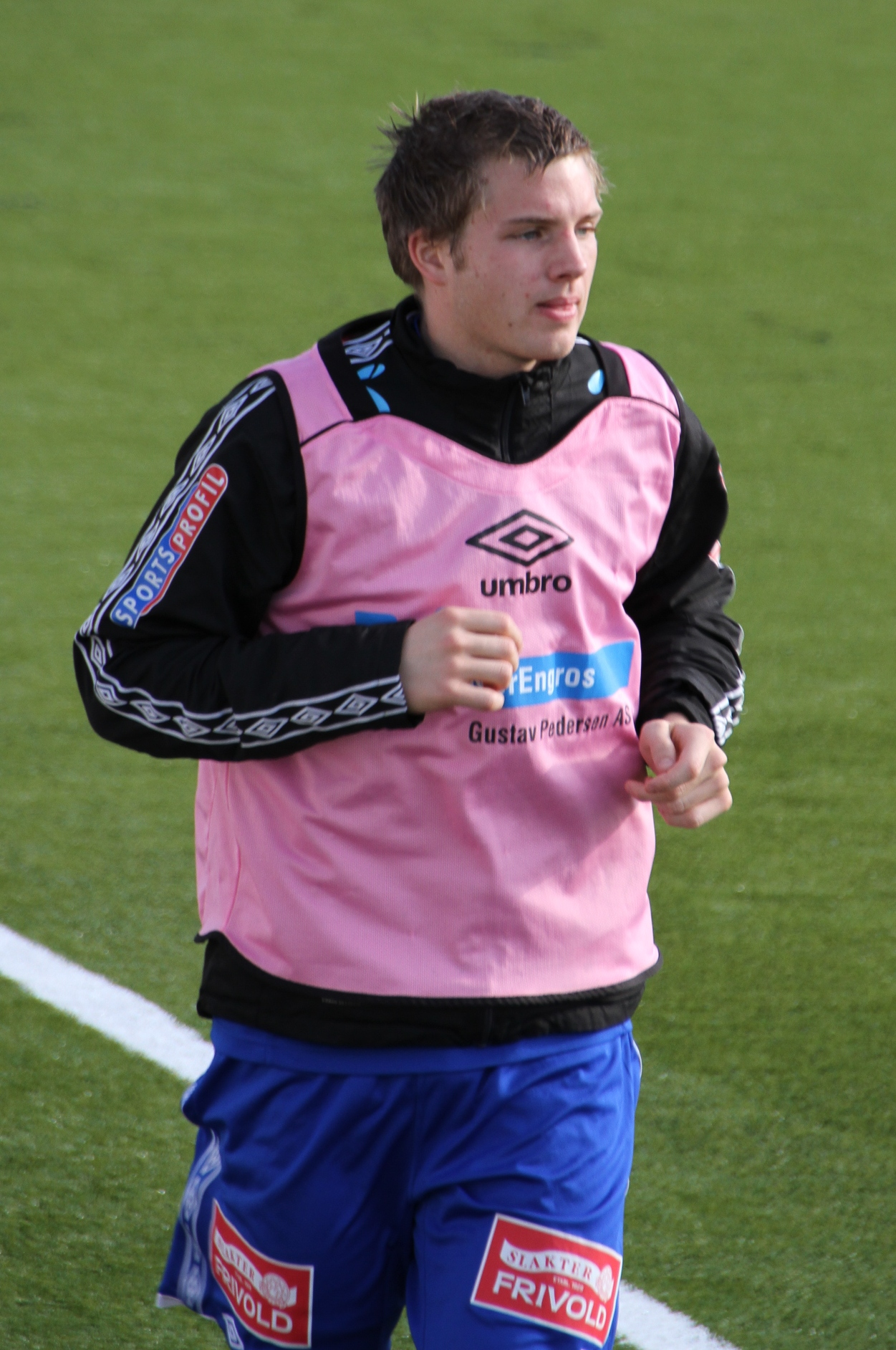
- Valderhaug in 2012

Personal information
- Date of birth: 26 April 1990 (age 36)
- Place of birth: Valderøy, Norway
- Position: Goalkeeper

Team information
- Current team: Åkra
- Number: 1

Youth career
- Valder
- Åkra

Senior career*
Years	Team	Apps	(Gls)
2007–2012	Molde	2	(0)
2010	→ Kristiansund (loan)	9	(0)
2012	→ Start (loan)	1	(0)
2012	Kongsvinger	12	(0)
2013–2014	Kristiansund	9	(0)
2014–	Åkra	1	(0)
- * Club domestic league appearances and goals as of 26 August 2013

Elias Valderhaug (born 26 April 1990) is a Norwegian footballer who plays as a goalkeeper for Åkra in 3. divisjon. He has previously played for Molde in Tippeligaen, and has also had spells with Start and Kongsvinger.

== Career ==
Valderhaug was born in Valderøy and played for IL Valder and Åkra IL before joining Molde in 2007. He made his debut on the first-team, when he replaced Knut Dørum Lillebakk in the 87th minute in the quarter-final of the 2009 Norwegian Football Cup against Rosenborg on 9 August 2009. Valderhaug was sent on loan together with his team-mate Jacob Meidell to the nabour club Kristiansund BK in August 2012, where he played nine matches in the Second Division. Valderhaug made his debut in Tippeligaen against Sarpsborg 08 on 20 November 2011, after Ole Gunnar Solskjær decided to let him play the last two games of the season instead of Espen Bugge Pettersen, since Molde already had won Tippeligaen that year.

Valderhaug joined Start on a short-term loan-deal on 12 April 2012, due to injuries on both their goalkeepers, Alexander Lund Hansen and Johnny Kristiansen. Valderhaug played Start's match against HamKam three days later, but returned to Molde in the middle of June even though the loan lasted to 1 August as both Start's goalkeeper had returned from their injuries.

Valderhaug joined Kongsvinger in August 2012 on a short-term contract to the end of the 2012 season, and played 12 matches for the team in the First Division. After seeing out his short-term contract, Valderhaug moved back to his home-county Møre og Romsdal and signed a two-year contract with the newly promoted First Division side Kristiansund BK.

== Club statistics ==
As of 26 August 2013

Club performance			League		Cup		Total	
Season	Club	League	Apps	Goals	Apps	Goals	Apps	Goals
2009	Molde	Tippeligaen	0	0	1	0	1	0
2010	Molde	Tippeligaen	0	0	0	0	0	0
2011	Molde	Tippeligaen	2	0	4	0	6	0
2010	Kristiansund (loan)	Second Division	9	0	-		9	0
2012	Start (loan)	Adeccoligaen	1	0	2	0	3	0
2012	Kongsvinger	Adeccoligaen	12	0	0	0	12	0
2013	Kristiansund	Adeccoligaen	1	0	0	0	1	0
2014	Kristiansund	1. divisjon	8	0	0	0	8	0
2014	Åkra	3. divisjon	1	0	0	0	1	0
Career total			34	0	7	0	41	0
