= Abdisalam Ibrahim =

Norwegian footballer (born 1991)

Personal information
- Full name: Abdisalam Abdulkadir Ibrahim
- Date of birth: 1 May 1991 (age 35)
- Place of birth: Mogadishu, Somalia
- Height: 1.85 m (6 ft 1 in)
- Position: Midfielder

Youth career
- 1998–2002: Øyer-Tretten
- 2002–2005: Lørenskog
- 2005–2007: Fjellhamar
- 2007–2010: Manchester City

Senior career*
Years	Team	Apps	(Gls)
2006–2007	Fjellhamar	4	(0)
2007–2014	Manchester City	1	(0)
2011	→ Scunthorpe United (loan)	11	(0)
2011–2012	→ NEC (loan)	8	(1)
2012–2013	→ Strømsgodset (loan)	38	(5)
2012–2013	→ Strømsgodset 2 (loan)	4	(1)
2014–2015	Olympiacos	1	(0)
2014	→ Ergotelis (loan)	12	(1)
2015–2016	Veria	7	(0)
2016–2017	Viking	25	(2)
2016	→ Viking 2	1	(1)
2017–2018	Vålerenga	33	(0)
2017–2018	→ Vålerenga 2	14	(3)
2019–2020	Pafos	9	(0)
2019	→ Riga (loan)	2	(0)
2021	Bisceglie	1	(0)
2022	Ullensaker/Kisa	8	(1)

International career^{‡}
2007–2008	Norway U17	6	(1)
2009	Norway U18	5	(0)
2009–2010	Norway U19	5	(0)
2010–2013	Norway U21	11	(0)
2012–2013	Norway U23	3	(0)
2014	Norway	2	(0)
- * Club domestic league appearances and goals as of 17 March 2022 ‡ National team caps and goals as of 18 January 2014

Abdisalam Abdulkadir Ibrahim (born 1 May 1991) is a footballer who last played as a midfielder for Ullensaker/Kisa in the OBOS-ligaen. Born in Somalia, he has represented the Norway national team.

== Club career ==
=== Early career ===
Born in Somalia, Ibrahim moved to Norway in 1998. He began his football career as a youth in Norway with Øyer-Tretten before eventually moving to Lørenskog, where he played for Fjellhamar. He got his debut for Fjellhamar's senior team in 2006.

He transferred to Manchester City effective from 1 July 2007. In the spring of 2008, he was on the winning team in the FA Youth Cup final, as Manchester City beat Chelsea 4–2 on aggregate.

Ibrahim played as a midfielder. At the age of 18, his style of play was compared by some at the club to then teammate Patrick Vieira.

Ibrahim made his senior debut starting on 24 January 2010, in the FA Cup game against Scunthorpe United. He was on the bench in the 3–1 defeat to Manchester United in the League Cup semi-final at Old Trafford, as well as the match against Portsmouth at Eastlands on 31 January. On 21 February 2010, he made his Premier League debut as a substitute for Manchester City in a 0–0 draw against Liverpool. Ibrahim was rewarded with a new contract on 7 April 2010, which tied him to the club until 2014. Ibrahim made his League Cup debut and first starting appearance at West Brom on Wednesday, 22 September 2010.

On 14 January 2011, it was announced that he would join Scunthorpe United on loan for one month, this loan period subsequently being extended in mid-February to the end of the season.

On 31 July 2011, it was announced that he would join Dutch Eredivisie side NEC on a season-long loan deal. Ibrahim featured in two cup matches and had eight Eredivisie spells scoring one goal before the loan deal was terminated on 22 March on mutual consent because Ibrahim had trouble with his role on the bench for most of the season.

Ibrahim spent the second half of the 2012 season on loan with Strømsgodset, before he again was on six-month loan to Godset in January 2013. In the 2013 season, Ibrahim played 17 matches for Strømsgodset when the team won the Tippeligaen, which was his first title as a pro.

On 22 January 2014, Ibrahim's was released from his contract at Manchester City, having resided in the United Kingdom for three and a half years.

=== Greece ===
On 24 January 2014, Ibrahim announced that he is joining Greek champions club Olympiacos for the next 3.5 years. Ibrahim made just one appearance for the Greek champions and he immediately joined Superleague club Ergotelis on loan until the end of the season On the beginning of 2014–15 season he returned to Olympiacos.

After being released on a free transfer from Olympiacos, Ibrahim signed a two-year contract with the Greek club Veria on 24 August 2015. Ibrahim debuted on 29 August 2015 in a 2–0 away win against Panthrakikos. He was sent off against his former club, Olympiacos on the 31 October 2015.

=== Back to Norway ===
On 13 January 2016, Ibrahim signed a contract with Norwegian Tippeligaen club Viking. His contract lasts for three years, until 31 December 2018.

Ibrahim signed with Vålerenga in March 2017, and left the club again at the end of the 2018 season.

=== Cyprus ===
He joined Cypriot team Pafos as a free agent on deadline day, 31 January 2019. On 30 August he was substituted against AEK Larnaca only 36 minutes into Pafos' second Cypriot First Division game of the season, due to an injury. He was later ruled out for six to eight months.

=== Italy ===
On 24 March 2021, he joined Italian third-tier Serie C club Bisceglie.

== International career ==
At international level, Ibrahim has represented Norway at every age group from Under 15 to Under 21. He is still eligible for both his native country Somalia as well as his adopted country, but has stated a desire to represent the Norwegian national team if called up. On 15 January 2014, he made his debut with the national team in a 2–1 away friendly win against Moldova. Having never featured for Norway in a competitive match, Ibrahim remains potentially eligible for Somalia national team.

== Personal life ==
Abdisalam has an older brother, Abdirashid Ibrahim, a semi-professional footballer formerly of FC United of Manchester and Rossendale United. He also has a little brother, Abdijabar Ibrahim, who attends ESSA Academy. Ibrahim was an Arsenal fan when growing up and Patrick Vieira was his hero and more recently Yaya Toure. His nickname is Abdi. Within a few weeks in the late spring of 2013, his younger sister died and Ibrahim became a father for the first time.
