= Modum FK =

Norwegian football club

- Full name: Modum Fotballklubb
- Nickname: MFK
- Founded: 30 May 2007
- Ground: Rolighetsmoen
- Chairman: Eivind Kopland
- Manager: Benny Olsen, Øyvind Kjølstad
- League: Third division
- 2012: Third Division/ 3, 2nd
Home colours	Away colours

Modum Fotballklubb is a Norwegian football club from Modum, founded in 2007 as a merger between the first teams of Åmot IF, IL Moingen, Vikersund IF, Haugfoss IF, Bingen BK and Geithus IL. The merger plans had been ongoing for some time.

It entered the league system for the 2008 season, taking the place of Åmot IF in the Second Division. Åmot started anew in the Fourth Division. However, already in the first season Modum were relegated. In addition, Åmot won promotion, so in 2009 the teams faced each other in the Third Division. However, Åmot was relegated after one season, while Modum have been playing in the Third Division since.
