= Dawda Leigh =

Norwegian footballer (born 1986)

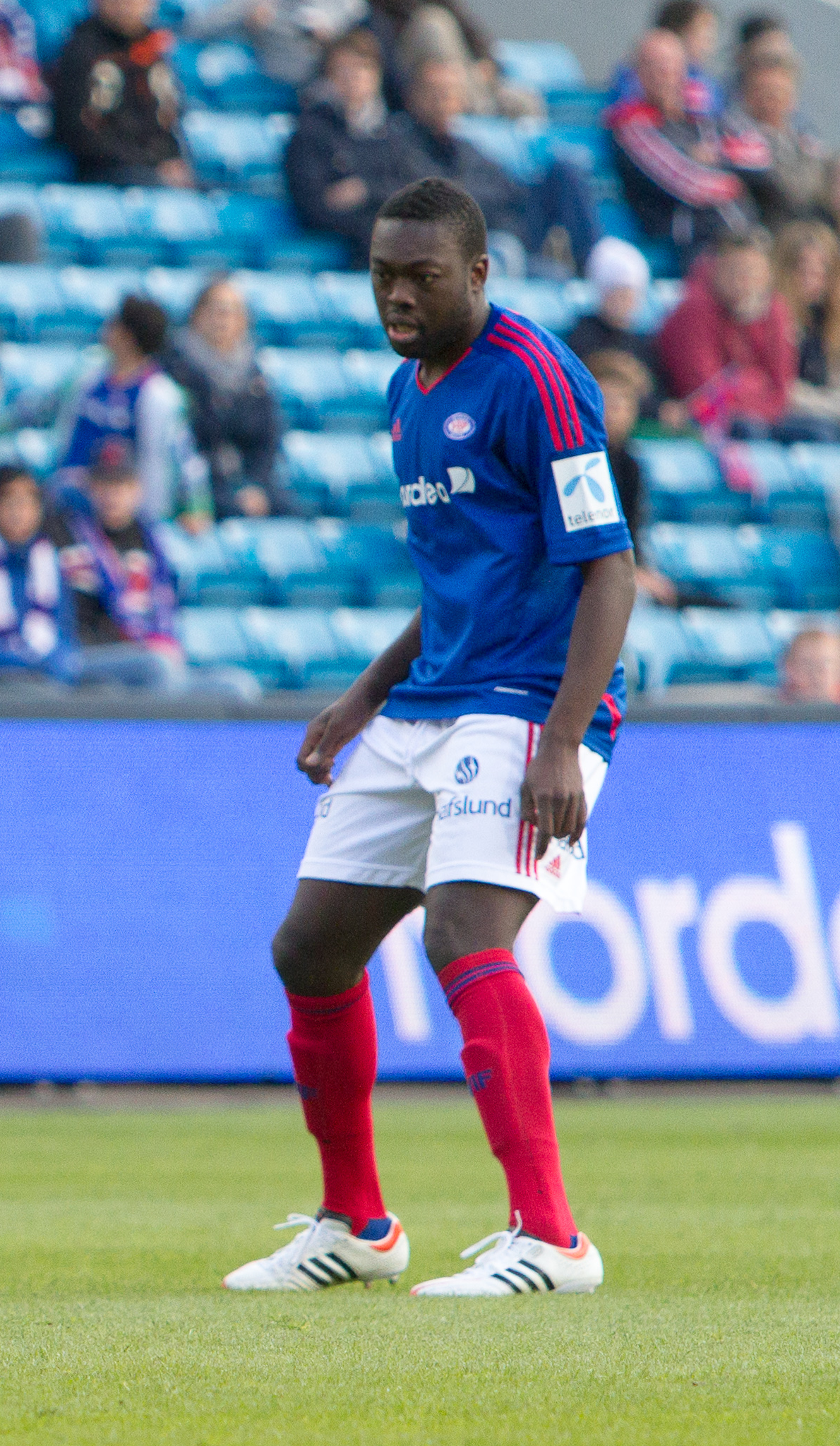
- Leigh in 2012 with Vålerenga

Personal information
- Date of birth: 27 June 1986 (age 40)
- Place of birth: Oslo, Norway
- Height: 1.81 m (5 ft 11 in)
- Position: Winger

Youth career
- –2003: Ellingsrud

Senior career*
Years	Team	Apps	(Gls)
2003–2008	Skeid	78	(6)
2009–2012	Vålerenga	57	(1)
2012	Sandefjord	9	(0)
2015	Kristiansund	3	(0)
2016–2017	Moss	18	(2)

International career
2004	Norway U18	11	(1)
2005	Norway U19	4	(0)
- * Club domestic league appearances and goals

Dawda Leigh (born 27 June 1986) is a Norwegian former professional footballer who played as a winger for Skeid, Vålerenga, Sandefjord and Moss. He is of Gambian descent and represented Norway at youth international level.

== Club career ==
Leigh was born in Oslo and played for Ellingsrud before he joined the First Division side Skeid in 2003. He was invited on a trial with Rosenborg in January 2005, but rejected their offer as he was called up to play for Norway U19. After playing for Skeid for five seasons Leigh signed for the Tippeligaen side Vålerenga together with his teammate Mostafa Abdellaoue in September 2008. They were both free agents and joined the club in January 2009. Leigh made his debut in Tippeligaen against Rosenborg on 15 March 2009. In his debut at Ullevaal Stadion, he assisted Bengt Sæternes' goal in the 1–1 draw against Aalesund.

Despite playing in the Second Division with Skeid the previous season, Leigh instantly became a regular in Vålerenga's starting line-up and started nine of the ten first matches of the season, and played a total of 21 matches scoring one goal in 2009. Leigh struggled in his second season at Vålerenga and played only 152 minutes in Tippeligaen. After another season with limited playtime he wanted to go on loan to Odd Grenland in August 2011, but stayed at Vålerenga for one more year, and played 12 matches for the club until he left the club in August 2012. Leigh played a total of 57 matches and scored one goal for Vålerenga in Tippeligaen.

Leigh signed a contract lasting to the end of the 2012 season with the First Division side Sandefjord in August 2012 He played nine league-matches for Sandefjord, in addition to the promotion play-off match against Ullensaker/Kisa, which Sandefjord lost 4–3. After his contract expired, he was linked to English club Bolton Wanderers.

Leigh signed a contract for the 2015 season with the First Division side Kristiansund in March 2015.

== International career ==
Leigh has represented Norway at youth international level, and played 11 matches and scored one goal for Norway U18 in 2004 before he played four matches for Norway U19 in 2005.

== Personal life ==
Leigh is a supporter of Manchester United and stated in an interview in 2005 that he would reject Liverpool if they wanted to sign him one day.

== Career statistics ==
Appearances and goals by club, season and competition
Club	Season	League			Cup		Total	
Club	Season	Division	Apps	Goals	Apps	Goals	Apps	Goals
Skeid	2003	Adeccoligaen	1	0	0	0	1	0
Skeid	2004	Adeccoligaen	17	1	0	0	17	1
Skeid	2005	Adeccoligaen	14	0	2	1	16	1
Skeid	2007	Adeccoligaen	20	0	1	0	21	0
Skeid	2008	Second Division	26	5	1	0	27	5
Skeid	Total		78	6	4	1	82	7
Vålerenga	2009	Tippeligaen	21	1	2	0	23	1
Vålerenga	2010	Tippeligaen	6	0	1	0	7	0
Vålerenga	2011	Tippeligaen	18	0	2	0	20	0
Vålerenga	2012	Tippeligaen	12	0	2	0	14	0
Vålerenga	Total		57	1	7	0	64	1
Sandefjord	2012	Adeccoligaen	9	0	0	0	9	0
Kristiansund	2015	OBOS-ligaen	3	0	1	0	4	0
Moss	2016	PostNord-ligaen	7	1	0	0	7	1
Moss	2017	Norsk Tipping-ligaen	11	1	0	0	11	1
Moss	Total		18	2	0	0	18	2
Career total			165	9	12	1	177	10
