= Ishavsbyen FK =

Norwegian football club

- Full name: Ishavsbyen Fotballklubb
- Nickname: Byen
- Founded: 1993
- Ground: TUIL Arena, Tromsdalen
- League: 3. divisjon
Home colours

Ishavsbyen Fotballklubb is a Norwegian association football club from Tromsdalen, Troms.

The club was founded in 1993. The men's football team won promotion to the 3. divisjon, the fourth tier of Norwegian football, in 1999. After two seasons the club was relegated in 2001, but returned in 2003 and has played there since.
