= Åmot IF =

Norwegian sports club

- Full name: Åmot Idrettsforening
- Founded: 19 March 1919
- Ground: Åmot stadion, Åmot, Norway
- Manager: Trond Skikstein
- League: 6. divisjon Buskerud avd. 1 (tier 7)
- 2018: 5. divisjon Buskerud (tier 6), 14th
Home colours	Away colours

Åmot Idrettsforening is a Norwegian multisports club located in Åmot, Buskerud. It has sections for boxing, handball, football and cross-country skiing.

The football team being the most prominent, it played in the Second Division as late as 2007, but for the next season its first team merged with others to become Modum FK. Hence, Åmot's second team in the Fourth Division emerged as its new first team. In the 2008 season Åmot was runner up in Fourth Division and was promoted to Third Division. Åmot was relegated in 2009.

== Recent seasons ==
Season	Level	Division	Section	Position	Movements	Note/ source
1999	Tier 4	3. divisjon	Vestfold avd. 6	5th/12		
2000	Tier 4	3. divisjon	Buskerud avd. 5	7th/12		
2001	Tier 4	3. divisjon	Vestfold avd. 9	5th/12		
2002	Tier 4	3. divisjon	Vestfold avd. 9	4th/12		
2003	Tier 4	3. divisjon	Buskerud avd. 8	6th/12		
2004	Tier 4	3. divisjon	Buskerud avd. 4	3rd/12		
2005	Tier 4	3. divisjon	Indre Østland avd. 7	1st/12	Promoted	
2006	Tier 3	2. divisjon	Avd. 1	11th/14		
2007	Tier 3	2. divisjon	Avd. 4	7th/14		
2008	Tier 5	4. divisjon	Buskerud	2nd/12	Promoted	
2009	Tier 4	3. divisjon	Buskerud avd. 8	12th/12	Relegated	
2010	Tier 5	4. divisjon	Buskerud	4th/12		
2011	Tier 5	4. divisjon	Buskerud	12th/14		
2012	Tier 5	4. divisjon	Buskerud	13th/15	Relegated	
2013	Tier 6	5. divisjon	Buskerud avd. 1	4th/12		
2014	Tier 6	5. divisjon	Buskerud avd. 2	5th/12		
2015	Tier 6	5. divisjon	Buskerud avd. 1	6th/12		As Åmot IF/Modum FK 2
2016	Tier 6	5. divisjon	Buskerud avd. 1	2nd/12		As Åmot IF/Modum FK 2
2017	Tier 6	5. divisjon	Buskerud	14th/14		As Åmot IF/Modum FK 2
2018	Tier 6	5. divisjon	Buskerud	14th/14	Relegated	
