= Sandnessjøen IL =

Norwegian sports club

- Full name: Sandnessjøen Idrettslag
- Nickname(s): SIL
- Founded: 1914
- Ground: Stamnes kunstgress, Sandnessjøen
- League: Third Division
- 2012: Third Division / 11, 4th
Home colours

Sandnessjøen Idrettslag is a Norwegian sports club from Sandnessjøen in Alstahaug Municipality, Nordland county. It has sections for association football and team handball.

The men's football team currently plays in the Third Division, the fourth tier of Norwegian football. It last played in the Norwegian Second Division in 1997. Their men's handball team currently plays in the third division and goes by the nickname "Swingers".

== Current squad ==
Updated 9 April 2013

Note: Flags indicate national team as defined under FIFA eligibility rules; some limited exceptions apply. Players may hold more than one non-FIFA nationality.

No.	Pos.	Nation	Player
1	GK	(Norway) NOR	Ronny Pedersen
2	DF	(Bulgaria) BUL	Martin Dimov
3	DF	(Norway) NOR	Mats Krokstrand
4	DF	(Norway) NOR	Stian Nordberg Johansen
6	MF	(Norway) NOR	Stian Theting (captain)
7	MF	(Norway) NOR	Daniel Anfindsen
8	MF	(Norway) NOR	Marius Kirkhus
9	FW	(Norway) NOR	Glenn André Pedersen
10	FW	(Norway) NOR	Amund Olsbyengen
12	GK	(Norway) NOR	Jonas Sjøvoll

No.	Pos.	Nation	Player
14	FW	(Norway) NOR	Espen Øhlen
16	DF	(Norway) NOR	Joakim Mikalsen
18	MF	(Norway) NOR	Christoffer Strøm Jakobsen
19	FW	(Norway) NOR	Vegard Theting
20	DF	(Norway) NOR	Lars Ottestad
21	MF	(Norway) NOR	Vidar Skog Tømmervik
22	MF	(Norway) NOR	Asgeir Angel Salamonsen
23	DF	(Norway) NOR	Leif Henning Welde Grønli
24	MF	(Norway) NOR	Henrik Krokstrand Henriksen
69	DF	(Norway) NOR	Mads Knutsen

For season transfers, see transfers winter 2011–12 and transfers summer 2012.
