= Bjørkelangen SF =

Norwegian football club

- Full name: Bjørkelangen Sportsforening
- Founded: 12 March 1910
- League: Third Division
- 2025: 11th

Bjørkelangen Sportsforening is a Norwegian multi-sports club from Bjørkelangen in Aurskog-Høland municipality. It has sections for association football, team handball, floorball, cross-country skiing, swimming and cycling.

Their men's football team (named Bjørkelangen/Høland Fotball, or simply called Bjørkelangen) is currently playing in the Third Division after earning promotion in 2023. Prior to the 2024 season, this team was named Aurskog-Høland Fotballklubb (AHFK).
