= Bossmo & Ytteren IL =

Norwegian sports club

- Full name: Bossmo & Ytteren Idrettslag
- Founded: 1908
- Ground: Ytteren stadion, Ytteren
- League: Fourth Division
Home colours

Bossmo & Ytteren Idrettslag is a Norwegian sports club from Rana Municipality in Nordland county. It has sections for association football, team handball, biathlon and Nordic skiing.

The club was founded in 1908.

Its best known member is Olympic skier Elin Nilsen. The men's football team currently plays in the Fourth Division, the fifth tier of Norwegian football. They last played in the Third Division in 2008.
