= Fjellhamar FK =

Norwegian football club

Fjellhamar
- Full name: Fjellhamar Fotballklubb
- Founded: 1976
- Ground: Fjellhamar Stadium & Torshov
- League: Fourth Division
- 2023: 6th, Akershus
Home colours	Away colours

Fjellhamar Fotballklubb is a Norwegian association football club from Fjellhamar in Lørenskog.

It was founded in 1976. The men's football team currently plays in the Fourth Division, the fifth tier of Norwegian football. The team had a lengthy stay in the Third Division, continuously from 1998 to 2014. Fjellhamar stadium is their home field and they also have the disposal of Torshov stadion. The team colors are white and red(white shirts, red shorts, red socks).

Its most notable former player is Abdisalam Ibrahim.
