= Eide og Omegn FK =

Norwegian sports club

- Full name: Eide og Omegn Fotballklubb
- Founded: 30 December 1992
- Ground: Eide Kunstgressbane; Hustadvika Municipality
- Manager: Odd Berg
- League: Norwegian Fourth Division
- 2018: 4. divisjon, Nordmøre & Romsdal, 2nd
Home colours

Eide og Omegn FK is a Norwegian association football club from Hustadvika Municipality in Møre og Romsdal.

The club was founded in 1992, as a merge between Eide IL, Lyngstad IL and Frode IL.

The men's football team currently resides in the Norwegian Fourth Division (Tier 5). Its last stint in the Third Division came from 2003 to 2006.
