= IL Høyang =

Norwegian sports club

- Full name: Idrettslaget Høyang
- Founded: 1957
- League: Fourth Division
Home colours

Idrettslaget Høyang is a Norwegian sports club from Høyanger Municipality. It has sections for association football, skiing, team handball, floorball, volleyball, track and field athletics, karate and swimming.

It was founded in 1957. The men's football team currently plays in the Fourth Division, the fifth tier of Norwegian football, after being relegated from the Third Division in 2010. Team colors are red and white. Former players include Vegar Gjermundstad and Even Hovland; female players include Siri Nordeide Grønli.
