= Innstrandens IL =

Norwegian sports club

Innstranden
- Full name: Innstrandens Idrettslag
- Founded: 8 August 1920; 105 years ago
- Ground: Mørkvedlia stadion, Bodø
- Manager: Aram Khalili
- League: –
- 2024: 3. divisjon group 6, 11th of 14
Home colours

Innstrandens Idrettslag is a Norwegian sports club from Bodø, Nordland. It has sections for association football, volleyball, handball, praralympics and Nordic skiing.

The club was founded on 8 August 1920.

The men's football team currently plays in the Third Division, the fourth tier of Norwegian football. It last played in the Norwegian Second Division in 2005. After the 2001, 2003 and 2007 seasons it contested playoffs to win promotion, but failed (it did succeed after the 2004 season, but was relegated straight back).

After yet another stint in the Third Division, surviving relegation in 2024, the club decided in January 2025 to withdraw the men's team from the 2025 Norwegian Third Division.

Innstrandens IL has app. 1.300 members.

== Recent history ==
| Season | | Pos. | Pl. | W | D | L | GS | GA | P | Cup | Notes |
|---|---|---|---|---|---|---|---|---|---|---|---|
| 2005 | D2 | 14 | 26 | 5 | 4 | 17 | 30 | 50 | 19 | 1st round | Relegated to 3. Division |
| 2006 | D3 | 2 | 22 | 15 | 4 | 3 | 107 | 38 | 49 | 1st qualifying round | |
| 2007 | D3 | 1 | 22 | 18 | 2 | 2 | 102 | 22 | 56 | 1st round | |
| 2008 | D3 | 5 | 22 | 12 | 2 | 8 | 62 | 42 | 37 | 1st qualifying round | |
| 2009 | D3 | 2 | 20 | 12 | 5 | 3 | 63 | 33 | 41 | 2nd qualifying round | |
| 2010 | D3 | 3 | 22 | 13 | 2 | 7 | 63 | 45 | 41 | 1st round | |
| 2011 | D3 | 8 | 22 | 6 | 3 | 13 | 33 | 67 | 21 | 1st qualifying round | |
| 2012 | D3 | 10 | 22 | 7 | 5 | 10 | 38 | 51 | 26 | 1st qualifying round | |
| 2013 | D3 | 12 | 22 | 3 | 1 | 18 | 28 | 88 | 10 | 1st qualifying round | |
| 2014 | D3 | 11 | 22 | 4 | 3 | 15 | 38 | 52 | 15 | 1st qualifying round | Relegated to 4. Division |
| 2015 | D4 | 2 | 18 | 12 | 2 | 4 | 62 | 29 | 38 | 1st qualifying round | |
| 2016 | D4 | 2 | 18 | 14 | 2 | 2 | 67 | 15 | 44 | 1st qualifying round | |
| 2017 | D4 | 7 | 20 | 7 | 3 | 10 | 35 | 58 | 24 | 1st qualifying round | |
| 2018 | D4 | 7 | 16 | 5 | 3 | 8 | 28 | 37 | 18 | 1st qualifying round | |
| 2019 | D4 | 6 | 16 | 7 | 0 | 9 | 37 | 25 | 21 | 2nd qualifying round | |
