= 2021 Norwegian Second Division (women) =

Norwegian football season

Norwegian Second Division
- Season: 2021
- Promoted: AaFK Fortuna; Grand Bodø

The 2021 Norwegian Second Division was a third-tier Norwegian women's football league season. The league consisted of 70 teams divided into 8 groups. AaFK Fortuna and Grand Bodø were promoted and no teams were relegated. Reserve teams were not eligible for promotion.

== League tables ==
Group 1

1. Sarpsborg 08 − promotion play-offs
2. Ullensaker/Kisa
3. Røa 2
4. Snøgg
5. Grei 2
6. Kolbotn 2
7. Høybråten og Stovner
8. Hallingdal
9. Gjelleråsen

Group 2

1. Odd − promotion play-offs
2. Nanset
3. Gimletroll
4. Vålerenga 2
5. Øvrevoll Hosle 2
6. Stathelle
7. Arendal/Sørfjell
8. Sandefjord
9. Runar
10. Eik Tønsberg

Group 3

1. LSK Kvinner 2
2. Lyn 2
3. Frigg − promotion play-offs
4. Stabæk 2
5. Kongsvinger
6. Raufoss
7. Storhamar
8. Bærums Verk Hauger
9. Fart 2
10. Ottestad

Group 4

1. Viking − promotion play-offs
2. Bryne
3. Fyllingsdalen
4. Arna-Bjørnar 2
5. Kaupanger
6. Avaldsnes 2
7. Haugar
8. Loddefjord
9. Klepp 2
10. Staal Jørpeland
11. Stord
12. Lura

Group 5

1. AaFK Fortuna − promotion play-offs
2. Molde
3. Rosenborg 2
4. Byåsen
5. Herd
6. Tynset
7. Volda
8. Nardo
9. Hødd
10. Træff

Group 6

1. Grand Bodø − promotion play-offs
2. Grand Bodø 2
3. Halsøy
4. Bossmo & Ytteren
5. Brønnøysund
6. Innstranden
7. Sandnessjøen

Group 7

1. Mjølner − promotion play-offs
2. Medkila 2
3. Sortland
4. Kilkameratene
5. Harstad

Group 8

1. Bossekop − promotion play-offs
2. Tromsdalen
3. Fløya 2
4. Senja/Finnsnes
5. Porsanger
6. Polarstjernen
7. HIF/Stein

== Promotion play-offs ==
AaFK Fortuna, Bossekop and Viking received a bye to the second stage. Two teams were to be promoted, as there was no play-off against the second-to-bottom team of the First Division.

=== First stage ===
Group 1

1. Odd − advance to second stage
2. Frigg − advance to second stage
3. Sarpsborg 08

Group 2

1. Grand Bodø − advance to second stage
2. Mjølner

=== Second stage ===
Group 1

1. AaFK Fortuna − promoted
2. Frigg
3. Bossekop

Group 2

1. Grand Bodø − promoted
2. Viking
3. Odd
