= 2019 Norwegian Second Division (women) =

Norwegian football season

Norwegian Second Division
- Season: 2019
- Promoted: KIL/Hemne

The 2019 Norwegian Second Division was a third-tier Norwegian women's football league season. The league consisted of 68 teams divided into 7 groups. KIL/Hemne were promoted. Reserve teams were not eligible for promotion.

== League tables ==
Group 1

1. Frigg − promotion play-offs
2. Raufoss
3. Lyn 2
4. Sarpsborg 08
5. Kongsvinger
6. Fart 2
7. Stabæk 2
8. Høybråten og Stovner
9. Vålerenga 2
10. Ullensaker/Kisa
11. Ottestad
12. Drøbak-Frogn − relegated

Group 2

1. Sandefjord − promotion play-offs
2. LSK Kvinner 2
3. Gimletroll
4. Øvrevoll Hosle 2
5. Kolbotn 2
6. Røa 2
7. Eik Tønsberg
8. Grei 2
9. Stathelle
10. Hallingdal
11. Urædd/Pors
12. Lier − relegated

Group 3

1. Viking − promotion play-offs
2. Bryne
3. Fyllingsdalen
4. Stord
5. Haugar
6. Klepp 2
7. Staal Jørpeland
8. Avaldsnes 2
9. Arna-Bjørnar 2
10. Voss − relegated
11. Vestsiden-Askøy − relegated
12. Hinna − relegated

Group 4

1. KIL/Hemne − promotion play-offs
2. Fortuna Ålesund (subsequently rebranded AaFK Fortuna)
3. Trondheims-Ørn 2
4. Molde
5. Herd
6. Hødd
7. Træff
8. Nardo
9. Sunndal − relegated

Group 5

1. Innstranden − group 5/6 play-off
2. Bossmo & Ytteren − group 5/6 play-off
3. Grand Bodø 2
4. Halsøy
5. Innstranden 2/Tverlandet
6. Fauske/Sprint
7. Sandnessjøen

Group 6

1. Mjølner − group 5/6 play-off
2. Medkila 2 − group 5/6 play-off
3. Sortland
4. Medkila 3
5. Svolvær/Henningsvær/Kabelvåg
6. Stokmarknes/Morild
7. Ballstad/Leknes
8. Harstad

Group 5/6 play-off

1. Mjølner − promotion play-offs
2. Bossmo & Ytteren
3. Innstranden
4. Medkila 2

Group 7

1. Tromsø − promotion play-offs
2. Bossekop
3. Tromsdalen
4. Fløya 2
5. Porsanger
6. Polarstjernen
7. Senja/Finnsnes
8. Tverrelvdalen

== Promotion play-offs ==
=== First stage ===
Group 1

1. Frigg − advance to second stage
2. Viking
3. Tromsø

Group 2

1. KIL/Hemne − advance to second stage
2. Sandefjord
3. Mjølner

=== Second stage ===
Frigg 1–2 (a.e.t.) KIL/Hemne

=== Third stage ===
KIL/Hemne went on to play Grand Bodø over two legs in the play-off final. KIL/Hemne won 5–4 on aggregate and were promoted to the 2020 Norwegian First Division.
