= 2022 Norwegian Second Division (women) =

Norwegian football season

Norwegian Second Division
- Season: 2022
- Promoted: Fyllingsdalen; Grei

The 2022 Norwegian Second Division was a third-tier Norwegian women's football league season. The league consisted of 71 teams divided into 8 groups. Fyllingsdalen and Grei were promoted. Reserve teams were not eligible for promotion. This was a transitional season; the following season the league consisted of 28 teams divided into two groups.

== League tables ==
Group 1

1. Odd – promotion play-offs
2. Stabæk 2
3. Arendal
4. Nanset
5. Gimletroll – relegation play-offs
6. Røa 2 – relegated
7. Sandefjord – relegated
8. Stathelle – relegated
9. Runar – relegated
10. Randesund/Amazon Grimstad 2 – relegated
11. Eik Tønsberg – relegated

- GØIF/Helgerød – withdrew

Group 2

1. Grei – promotion play-offs
2. Sogndal
3. KFUM Oslo
4. Lyn 2
5. Frigg – relegation play-offs
6. Øvrevoll Hosle 2 – relegated
7. Ullensaker/Kisa – relegated
8. Hønefoss 2 – relegated
9. Snøgg – relegated
10. Bærums Verk Hauger – relegated
11. Høybråten og Stovner – relegated

- Hallingdal – withdrew

Group 3

1. Kongsvinger – promotion play-offs
2. LSK Kvinner 2
3. Vålerenga 2
4. Fart
5. Sarpsborg 08 – relegation play-offs
6. Kolbotn 2 – relegated
7. Storhamar – relegated
8. Raufoss – relegated
9. Fredrikstad – relegated
10. Ottestad – relegated
11. Lillehammer – relegated

- Gjelleråsen – withdrew

Group 4

1. Fyllingsdalen – promotion play-offs
2. Viking
3. Avaldsnes 2
4. Haugesund
5. Bryne
6. Loddefjord – relegated
7. Klepp 2 – relegated
8. Staal Jørpeland – relegated
9. Arna-Bjørnar 2 – relegated
10. Vidar – relegated
11. Os – relegated
12. Stord – relegated

- Lura – withdrew

Group 5

1. Tiller – promotion play-offs
2. Molde
3. Rosenborg 2
4. Tynset
5. Herd
6. Hødd – relegated
7. Volda – relegated
8. Blindheim – relegated
9. Træff – relegated
10. Nardo – relegated

- Byåsen – withdrew

Group 6

1. Grand Bodø 2 – relegated
2. Bossmo & Ytteren – promotion play-offs
3. Halsøy – relegated
4. Innstranden – relegated
5. Sandnessjøen – relegated

- Brønnøysund – withdrew

Group 7

1. Mjølner – promotion play-offs
2. Medkila 2 – relegated
3. Harstad – relegated
4. Sortland – relegated

- Kilkameratene/Medkila 3 – withdrew

Group 8

1. Porsanger – promotion play-offs
2. TIL 2020 2 – relegated
3. Kirkenes/Bjørnevatn/Hesseng
4. Senja/Finnsnes – relegated
5. Skarp – relegated
6. Polarstjernen – relegated
7. Bossekop/Alta – relegated

- Tromsdalen – withdrew
- HIF/Stein – withdrew

== Promotion play-offs ==
The group winners, excluding reserve teams, take part in the promotion play-offs. Fyllingsdalen, Tiller and Porsanger received a bye to the second stage. Two teams were promoted.

=== First stage ===
Group 1

1. Odd – advance to second stage
2. Grei – advance to second stage
3. Kongsvinger

Group 2

1. Bossmo & Ytteren – advance to second stage
2. Mjølner

=== Second stage ===
Group 1

1. Grei – promoted
2. Porsanger
3. Tiller

Group 2

1. Fyllingsdalen – promoted
2. Odd
3. Bossmo & Ytteren

== Relegation play-offs ==
The fifth-placed teams in group 1, 2 and 3 take part in the relegation play-offs. One of them was relegated.

1. Sarpsborg 08
2. Frigg
3. Gimletroll – relegated
