= 2018 Norwegian Second Division (women) =

Norwegian football season

Norwegian Second Division
- Season: 2018
- Promoted: Hønefoss; Snøgg

The 2018 Norwegian Second Division was a third-tier Norwegian women's football league season. The league consisted of 67 teams divided into 7 groups. Hønefoss and Snøgg were promoted. Reserve teams were not eligible for promotion.

== League tables ==
Group 1

1. Hønefoss − promotion play-offs
2. Kongsvinger
3. Røa 2
4. Høybråten og Stovner
5. Frigg
6. Raufoss
7. Øvrevoll Hosle 2
8. Sarpsborg 08
9. Hallingdal
10. Grei 2
11. Fart 2
12. Fjellhamar

Group 2

1. Snøgg − promotion play-offs
2. LSK Kvinner 2
3. Lyn 2
4. Vålerenga 2
5. Kolbotn 2
6. Eik Tønsberg
7. Gimletroll
8. Stabæk 2
9. Donn
10. Lier
11. Pors

Group 3

1. Bryne − promotion play-offs
2. Fyllingsdalen
3. Klepp 2
4. Vestsiden-Askøy
5. Staal Jørpeland
6. Haugar
7. Sandviken 2
8. Voss
9. Arna-Bjørnar 2
10. Avaldsnes 2
11. Hinna
12. Fana

Group 4

1. Fortuna Ålesund − promotion play-offs
2. KIL/Hemne
3. Molde
4. Trondheims-Ørn 2
5. Herd
6. Orkanger
7. Sunndal
8. Surnadal/Søya/Todalen
9. Nardo
10. Byåsen 2

Group 5

1. Innstranden − group 5/6 play-off
2. Bossmo & Ytteren − group 5/6 play-off
3. Sandnessjøen
4. Grand Bodø 2
5. Innstranden 2
6. Gruben/Åga
7. Halsøy

Group 6

1. Sortland − group 5/6 play-off
2. Mjølner − group 5/6 play-off
3. Medkila 2
4. Håkvik
5. Leknes
6. Svolvær/Henningsvær/Kabelvåg

Group 5/6 play-off

1. Innstranden − promotion play-offs
2. Bossmo & Ytteren
3. Mjølner
4. Sortland

Group 7

1. Tromsø − promotion play-offs
2. Tromsdalen
3. Porsanger
4. Polarstjernen
5. Tverrelvdalen
6. Fløya 2
7. Senja/Finnsnes
8. Bossekop 2
9. Furuflaten

== Promotion play-offs ==
Group 1

1. Hønefoss − promoted
2. Bryne
3. Tromsø

Group 2

1. Snøgg − promoted
2. Fortuna Ålesund
3. Innstranden
