= 2023 Norwegian Women's Cup =

Tournament details
- Country: Norway

Final positions
- Champions: Rosenborg
- Runners-up: Vålerenga

The 2023 Norwegian Women's Cup was the 46th season of the Norwegian annual knock-out football tournament. The first round was played in March, April and May 2023. The final was played on 25 November 2023.

== First round ==
Team 1	Score	Team 2
31 March 2023
Molde	5–0	Hødd
10 April 2023
Sogndal	7–0	Volda
19 April 2023
Raufoss	0–1	Kolbotn
26 April 2023
KFUM	3–0	Kongsvinger
3 May 2023
Ullensaker/Kisa	1–10	Hønefoss
Nanset	1–2	Amazon Grimstad
Start	3–0	Bryne
Viking	w/o	Staal Jørpeland
Loddefjord	w/o	Fyllingsdalen
Herd	0–3	AaFK Fortuna
Tynset	1–3	Øvrevoll Hosle
Tiller	2–0	KIL/Hemne
Mjølner	1–3	TIL 2020
Skarp	0–2	Medkila
Porsanger	1–0	Bjørnevatn
Fredrikstad	2–1	Sarpsborg 08
Storhamar	1–6	Grei
Stathelle	0–2	Arendal
Haugesund	0–2	Klepp
Bossmo/Ytteren	0–4	Grand Bodø
HamKam	w/o	Frigg
4 May 2023
Odd	1–0	Sandefjord

== Second round ==
The 10 teams from Toppserien enter in this round.

Team 1	Score	Team 2
11 May 2023
Kolbotn	2–1	KFUM
30 May 2023
Medkila	3–0	TIL 2020
31 May 2023
Viking	0–2	Åsane
Grand Bodø	0–10	Røa
AaFK Fortuna	2–1	Molde
Start	1–2	Avaldsnes
Klepp	1–0	Amazon Grimstad
Fyllingsdalen	0–6	Brann
Sogndal	2–4	Arna-Bjørnar
Tiller	0–1	Rosenborg
Fredrikstad	0–3	LSK Kvinner
Arendal	0–3	Stabæk
Øvrevoll Hosle	2–0	Grei
Hønefoss	4–1	HamKam
Odd	0–1	Lyn
Porsanger	0–6	Vålerenga

== Third round ==
Team 1	Score	Team 2
21 June 2023
Røa	5–3	Hønefoss
Avaldsnes	0–3	Åsane
Brann	8–0	Klepp
Vålerenga	5–2	AaFK Fortuna
LSK Kvinner	4–0	Kolbotn
Arna-Bjørnar	0–5	Rosenborg
Medkila	1–4	Stabæk
Lyn	6–4	Øvrevoll Hosle

== Quarter-finals ==
Team 1	Score	Team 2
29 August 2023
Åsane	0–3	Lyn
LSK Kvinner	3–1	Brann
30 August 2023
Vålerenga	2–0	Røa
Stabæk	3–4	Rosenborg

== Semi-finals ==
30 September 2023	Rosenborg	2–1	LSK Kvinner	Trondheim
14:45 CEST	Magnúsdóttir 57'; Andreassen 64'	Report	Godø 62'	Stadium: Koteng Arena; Attendance: 669; Referee: Sarah Fatemeh Zangeneh

30 September 2023	Vålerenga	3–2 (a.e.t.)	Lyn	Oslo
16:45 CEST	Sævik 64'; Rogic 79'; Thorsnes 92'	Report	Melgård 33'; Mjåset 77'	Stadium: Intility Arena; Attendance: 685; Referee: Marit Buhaug Folstad

== Final ==
25 November 2023
16:15 CET

Rosenborg	1–0	Vålerenga
Andreassen 75'	Report

Ullevaal Stadion, Oslo
Attendance: 2,687
Referee: Karoline Marie Jensen
