= 2007 Norwegian Third Division =

Norwegian football league season

The 2007 season of the 3. divisjon, the fourth highest association football league for men in Norway.

Between 18 and 26 games (depending on group size) were played in 24 groups, with 3 points given for wins and 1 for draws. Twelve teams were promoted to the 2. divisjon through playoff.

== Tables ==
Oslo 1

1. Lyn 2 – won playoff
2. KFUM
3. Grei
4. Skeid 2
5. Grorud
6. Nordstrand
7. Lommedalen
8. Bygdø Monolitten
9. Vestli
10. Lille Tøyen
11. Teisen – relegated
- Andes – pulled team

Oslo 2

1. Frigg – lost playoff
2. St. Hanshaugen – relegated (voluntarily)
3. Oslo City
4. Follo 2
5. Nesodden
6. Heming
7. Sagene
8. Vollen
9. Bærum 2
10. Kolbotn
11. Rommen
12. Hauger – relegated

Oslo 3

1. Grüner – lost playoff
2. Ullern
3. Bøler
4. Årvoll
5. Asker 2
6. Kjelsås 2
7. Fagerborg
8. Kurer
9. Klemetsrud
10. Røa
11. Øvrevoll/Hosle
12. Fossum – relegated

Akershus

1. Skjetten – won playoff
2. Høland
3. Fjellhamar
4. Fet
5. Lørenskog 2
6. Bjerke
7. Eidsvold
8. Lillestrøm 3
9. Skedsmo
10. Funnefoss/Vormsund
11. Ull/Kisa 2
12. Aurskog/Finstadbru
13. Bjørkelangen – relegated
14. Blaker – relegated

Indre Østland 1

1. Raufoss 2
2. Valdres – won playoff
3. Brumunddal
4. Kolbu/KK
5. Ringsaker
6. Vardal
7. Redalen
8. Toten
9. Gjøvik-Lyn 2 – relegated
10. Ringebu/Fåvang – relegated
11. FF Lillehammer 2 – relegated
12. Ihle – relegated

Indre Østland 2

1. Kongsvinger 2
2. Ham-Kam 2 – lost playoff
3. Sander
4. Stange
5. Flisa
6. Elverum
7. Hadeland
8. Løten
9. Hamar
10. Trysil – relegated
11. Grue – relegated
12. Galterud – relegated

Buskerud

1. Strømsgodset 2 – won playoff
2. Birkebeineren
3. Åskollen
4. Åssiden
5. Kongsberg
6. Konnerud
7. Jevnaker
8. Hønefoss BK 2
9. Mjøndalen 2
10. Solberg
11. Svelvik
12. ROS – relegated

Østfold

1. Østsiden – won playoff
2. Kvik/Halden
3. Lisleby
4. Mysen
5. Sparta Sarpsborg 2
6. Hærland
7. Moss 2
8. Sprint-Jeløy 2 – relegated
9. Ås
10. Borgar
11. Greåker
12. Rygge
13. Trøgstad/Båstad
14. Gresvik – relegated

Vestfold

1. Fram Larvik – lost playoff
2. Sandar
3. Sandefjord 2
4. Ørn-Horten
5. Larvik Turn
6. Eik-Tønsberg
7. Flint
8. Falk
9. Svarstad
10. Tønsberg FK
11. Borre – relegated
12. Runar – relegated

Telemark

1. Tollnes – lost playoff
2. Skarphedin
3. Pors Grenland 2
4. Sannidal
5. Herkules
6. Urædd
7. Notodden 2
8. Skotfoss
9. Kjapp
10. Stathelle (-> Langesund/Stathelle)
11. Brevik
12. Gvarv – relegated

Agder

1. Vindbjart – won playoff
2. Trauma
3. Giv Akt
4. Våg
5. Søgne
6. Donn
7. Vigør
8. Tveit
9. Lyngdal
10. Mandalskameratene 2
11. Jerv
12. Flekkefjord/Kvinesdal – relegated
13. Start 3 – relegated
14. Grane – relegated

Rogaland 1

1. Randaberg – won playoff
2. Vardeneset
3. Bryne 2
4. Staal Jørpeland
5. Vaulen
6. Klepp
7. Buøy
8. Ålgård 2
9. Egersund
10. Frøyland
11. Nærbø
12. Ganddal
13. Sola
14. Bjerkreim – relegated

Rogaland 2

1. Kopervik – lost playoff
2. Vidar
3. Åkra
4. Haugesund 2
5. Djerv 1919
6. Skjold
7. Avaldsnes
8. Nord
9. Vard Haugesund 2
10. Sandnes Ulf 2
11. Vedavåg Karmøy
12. Sandved
13. Varhaug – relegated
14. Torvastad – relegated

Hordaland 1

1. Trio – lost playoff
2. Hovding
3. Vadmyra
4. Loddefjord
5. Follese
6. Øygard
7. Stord
8. Austevoll
9. Norheimsund
10. Lyngbø
11. Bremnes – relegated
12. Fitjar – relegated

Hordaland 2

1. Nest-Sotra – won playoff
2. Voss
3. Hald
4. Baune
5. Brann 2
6. Varegg
7. Arna-Bjørnar
8. Bergen Nord
9. Frøya
10. Sandviken
11. Ny-Krohnborg – relegated
12. Radøy/Manger – relegated

Sogn og Fjordane

1. Årdal – lost playoff
2. Sogndal 2
3. Førde
4. Stryn
5. Kaupanger
6. Florø
7. Fjøra
8. Tornado Måløy
9. Høyang
10. Eid
11. Dale – relegated
12. Eikefjord – relegated

Sunnmøre

1. Skarbøvik – won playoff
2. Brattvåg
3. Aalesund 2
4. Hareid
5. Hødd 2
6. Volda
7. Langevåg
8. Sykkylven
9. Spjelkavik
10. Valder
11. Blindheim
12. Ørsta – relegated

Nordmøre og Romsdal

1. Træff – lost playoff
2. Sunndal
3. Elnesvågen/Omegn
4. Molde 2
5. Kristiansund 2
6. Dahle
7. Måndalen
8. Rival
9. Surnadal
10. Vestnes Varfjell – relegated
11. Kristiansund – relegated
12. Midsund – relegated

Trøndelag 1

1. KIL/Hemne – won playoff
2. Ranheim 2
3. Tynset
4. NTNUI
5. Orkla
6. Melhus
7. Rosenborg 3
8. Flå
9. Nidelv
10. Rissa
11. Charlottenlund – relegated
12. Buvik – relegated

Trøndelag 2

1. Strindheim 2
2. Verdal – lost playoff
3. Stjørdals-Blink
4. Kolstad
5. Levanger 2
6. Namsos
7. Tiller
8. Neset
9. Vuku
10. Kattem
11. Rørvik – relegated
12. Malvik – relegated

Nordland

1. Innstranden – lost playoff
2. Steigen
3. Stålkameratene
4. Mosjøen
5. Fauske/Sprint
6. Bodø/Glimt 2
7. Tverlandet
8. Mo 2
9. Bossmo/Ytteren
10. Herøy/Dønna
11. Halsøy – relegated
12. Brønnøysund – relegated

Hålogaland

1. Lofoten – won playoff
2. Sortland
3. Landsås
4. Leknes
5. Harstad 2 – relegated
6. Skånland
7. Grovfjord
8. Medkila
9. Hardhaus
10. Morild – relegated

Troms

1. Senja – won playoff
2. Fløya
3. Skjervøy
4. Lyngen/Karnes
5. Ishavsbyen
6. Kvaløysletta
7. Finnsnes
8. Bardu – relegated (voluntarily)
9. Tromsdalen 2
10. Salangen
11. Skarp 2 – relegated (voluntarily)
12. Ramfjord

Finnmark

1. Kirkenes – lost playoff
2. Bossekop
3. Porsanger
4. Sørøy/Glimt
5. Alta 2
6. Kautokeino
7. Norild
8. Båtsfjord
9. Hammerfest 2 – relegated
10. Nordlys
11. Tverrelvdalen
