= 2019 Norwegian Women's Cup =

Tournament details
- Country: Norway
- Teams: 52

Final positions
- Champions: LSK Kvinner (5th title)
- Runners-up: Vålerenga

Tournament statistics
- Matches played: 51
- Goals scored: 276 (5.41 per match)
- Top goal scorer(s): Natasha Dowie (8 goals)

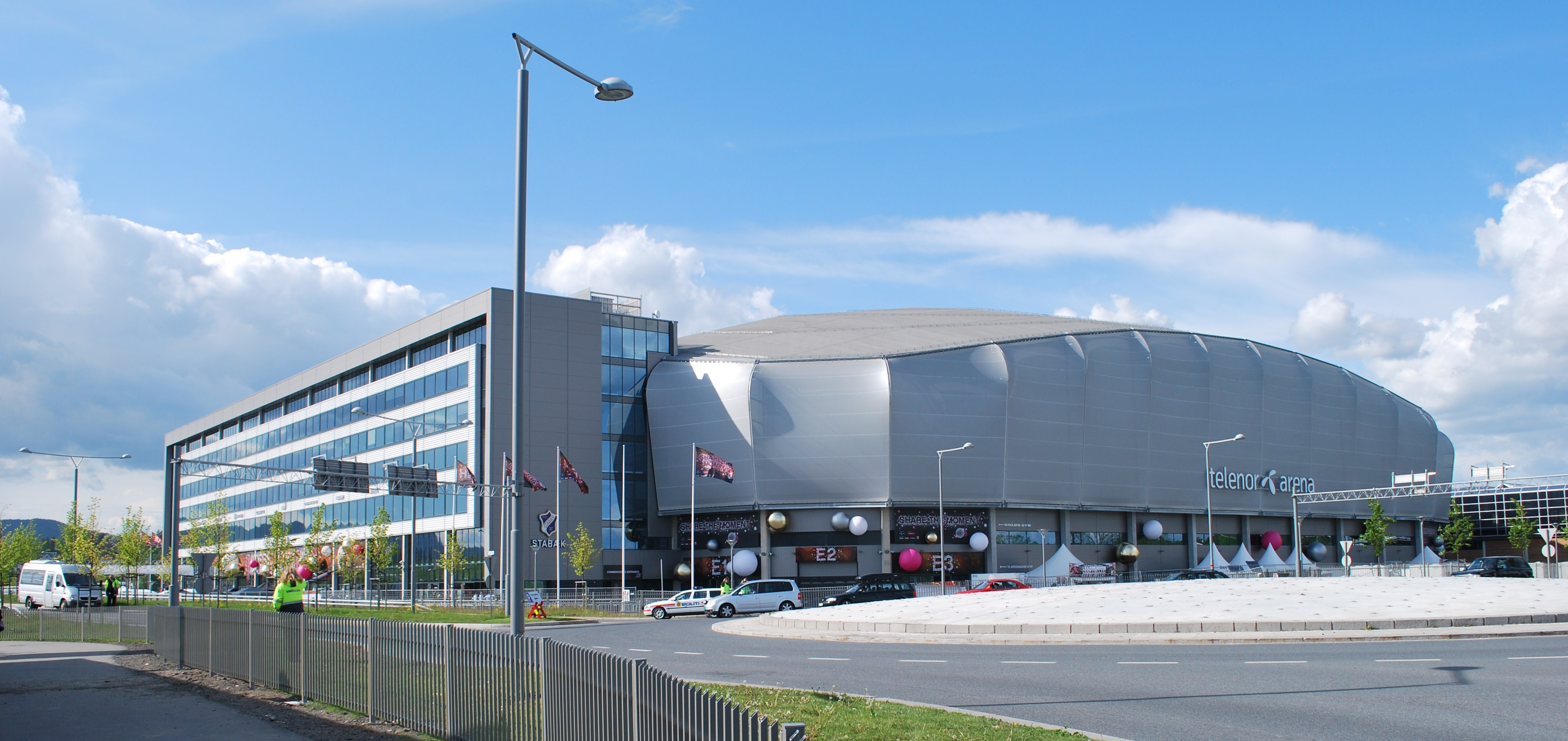
Telenor Arena, Bærum - venue for the Norwegian Women's Cup final

The 2019 Norwegian Women's Cup was the 42nd season of the Norwegian annual knock-out football tournament. It began with first round matches in April and May 2019. The first round was played between 22 April and 1 May and the tournament ended with the final which was held on 23 November 2019.

== Calendar ==
Below are the dates for each round as given by the official schedule:

Round	Main date	Number of fixtures	Clubs
First Round	1 May 2019	20	52 → 32
Second Round	15 May 2019	16	32 → 16
Third Round	31 July 2019	8	16 → 8
Quarter-finals	21 August 2019	4	8 → 4
Semi-finals	26 October 2019	2	4 → 2
Final	23 November 2019	1	2 → 1

== First round ==
Team 1	Score	Team 2
22 April 2019
Bryne	3–0	Gimletroll
25 April 2019
Raufoss	5–0	Lier
30 April 2019
Bossekop	5–0	Porsanger
Hønefoss	10–2	Eik-Tønsberg
1 May 2019
Sunndal	0–0	Herd
Haugar	6–1	Staal Jørpeland
Amazon Grimstad	5–2	Snøgg
Fortuna	2–1	Molde
KIL/Hemne	4–4	Byåsen
Nardo	1–8	Grand Bodø
Vestsiden-Askøy	2–0	Kaupanger
Sortland	1–4	Mjølner
Øvrevoll Hosle	11–0	Hallingdal
Fløya	6–0	Tromsdalen
Grei	7–1	Kongsvinger
Høybråten og Stovner	4–0	Sarpsborg 08
Innstranden	6–2	Bossmo & Ytteren
Medkila	6–1	Tromsø
Åsane	2–1	Fyllingen
Nanset	3–0 (w.o.)	Urædd

== Second round ==
Team 1	Score	Team 2
15 May 2019
Raufoss	0–6	Vålerenga
Amazon Grimstad	3–2	Lyn
Bryne	0–2	Avaldsnes
Fløya	4–0	Bossekop
Grand Bodø	3–1	Innstranden
Grei	4–1	Fart
Haugar	1–5	Klepp
Herd	0–7	Trondheims-Ørn
Høybråten og Stovner	0–5	LSK Kvinner
Mjølner	0–5	Medkila
Øvrevoll Hosle	1–3	Stabæk
Åsane	1–6	Arna-Bjørnar
Nanset	0–5	Røa
Hønefoss	2–7	Kolbotn
Fortuna	4–2	KIL/Hemne
Vestsiden-Askøy	0–5	Sandviken

== Third round ==
Number of teams per tier entering this round
Toppserien (1)	1. divisjon (2)	2. divisjon (3)	Total
10 / 12	5 / 12	1 / 76	16 / 100

31 July 2019	Trondheims-Ørn (1)	3–2	(2) Fløya	Trondheim
15:00	Elin Åhgren Sørum 3', 16'; Emilie Bragstad 90'	Report	Celine Emilie Nergård 20', 41'	Stadium: Koteng Arena; Referee: Marit Buhaug Folstad

31 July 2019	Kolbotn (1)	11–0	(2) Grand Bodø
17:00	Eline Hegg 7', 33'; Ingrid Elvebakken 13'; Julie Klæboe 16'; Karina Sævik 21'; Nora Eide Lie 29'; Isabell Herlovsen 66', 70', 78', 81', 85'	Report		Attendance: 120; Referee: Marit Skurdal

31 July 2019	LSK Kvinner (1)	4–0	(2) Amazon Grimstad	Lillestrøm
18:00	Meryll Abrahamsen 34'; Synne Skinnes Hansen 48'; Elise Thorsnes 76'; Therese Åsland 86'	Report		Stadium: LSK-Hallen; Referee: Malin Frantzen Øiseth

31 July 2019	Arna-Bjørnar (1)	3–2 (a.e.t.)	(1) Stabæk	Myrdal
18:00	Kristin Risnes 15', 74'; Karoline Heimvik Haugland 108'	Report	Thea Loennecken 79'; Iris Omarsdottir 90'	Attendance: 118; Referee: Sondre Brudvik

31 July 2019	Medkila (2)	0–3	(1) Røa	Harstad
19:00		Report	Rebecka Wanvik Holum 72'; Ochelle Anya de Courcy 80'	Stadium: Harstad stadion Attendance: 202; Referee: Ole Ragnar Jansen Knutsen

1 August 2019	Sandviken (1)	9–0	(2) Grei	Bergen
18:00	Maria Dybwad Brochmann 21', 43'; Marina Heggernes Jensen 35', 81', 82'; Camilla Ness Ervik 50'; Lisa Fjeldstad Naalsund 53', 74'; Amalie Vevle Eikeland 70'	Report		Stadium: Stemmemyren kunstgress

7 August 2019	Avaldsnes (1)	2–1	(1) Klepp	Karmøy
18:00	Olaug Tvedten 7', 84'	Report	Marthine Østenstad 43'	Stadium: Avaldsnes Idrettsenter; Attendance: 242; Referee: Cecilie Frøyland

7 August 2019	Fortuna (3)	1–3	(1) Vålerenga	Ålesund
18:30	Kari Erstad Skovly 31'	Report	Natasha Dowie 34' (pen.), 80', 82'	Stadium: Aksla Stadion; Attendance: 839; Referee: Tove Marie Tandstad

== Quarter-finals ==
Number of teams per tier entering this round
Toppserien (1)	1. divisjon (2)	2. divisjon (3)	Total
8 / 12	0 / 12	0 / 76	8 / 100

21 August 2019	Røa (1)	0–1	(1) Arna-Bjørnar	Oslo
17:00		Report	Stenevik 32' (pen.)	Stadium: Røa kunstgress Referee: Marit Buhaug Folstad

21 August 2019	Kolbotn (1)	1–3	(1) LSK Kvinner	Kolbotn
18:00	Lie 90'	Report	Nautnes 4', 67'; Thorsnes 39'	Stadium: Sofiemyr Stadion; Attendance: 237; Referee: Ingvild Langnes Aarland

21 August 2019	Vålerenga (1)	3–0	(1) Avaldsnes	Oslo
18:00	Dowie 24', 29', 79'	Report		Stadium: Intility Arena; Attendance: 279; Referee: Emilie Rodahl Dokset

21 August 2019	Trondheims-Ørn (1)	4–2	(1) Sandviken	Trondheim
18:00	Andreassen 8'; Clausen 19', 21'; Engesvik 45'; Vårhus (red card) 60'	Report	Brochmann 14'; Naalsund 80'	Stadium: Koteng Arena; Attendance: 265; Referee: Henrikke Holm Nervik

== Semi-finals ==
26 October 2019	Trondheims-Ørn (1)	0–2	(1) LSK Kvinner	Trondheim
13:00		Report	Thorsnes 45'; Åsland 90'	Stadium: Koteng Arena; Attendance: 628; Referee: Emilie Rodahl Torkelsen (Bækkelaget)

27 October 2019	Arna-Bjørnar (1)	1–4	(1) Vålerenga	Ytre Arna
13:00	Asom 8'	Report	Pedersen 21'; Njoya 74', 79', 85'	Stadium: Arna Idrettspark; Attendance: 725; Referee: Henrikke Holm Nervik Trygg/Lade)

== Final ==
23 November 2019
16:00

LSK Kvinner	5–1	Vålerenga
Thorsnes 11'; Nautnes 20', 25'; Åsland 45'; Sønstevold 57'	Report	Njoya 51'

Telenor Arena, Bærum
Attendance: 5,142
Referee: Ingvild Langnes Aarland (Malmefjorden)
