= 2024 Norwegian Second Division (women) =

Norwegian football season

Norwegian Second Division
- Season: 2024
- Dates: 20 April – 13 October
- Champions: Start (Group 1); HamKam (Group 2); Molde (Group 3)
- Promoted: Start; HamKam; Molde
- Relegated: Haugesund; Arendal; Nanset; Porsanger; Mjølner; Krokelvdalen
- Matches: 266
- Goals: 988 (3.71 per match)

The 2024 Norwegian Second Division was a third-tier Norwegian women's football league season. The league consisted of 30 teams divided into three groups of 10 teams. The season started on 20 April 2024 and ended on 13 October 2024, not including play-off matches.

== Group 1 ==
=== League table ===
Pos	Team	Pld	W	D	L	GF	GA	GD	Pts	Promotion, qualification or relegation
1	Start (C, P)	16	14	1	1	53	11	+42	43	Promotion to First Division
2	Klepp	16	12	0	4	49	22	+27	36	Qualification for the promotion play-offs
3	Bryne	16	10	1	5	46	18	+28	31	
4	Lyn 2	16	7	2	7	27	38	−11	23	
5	Stabæk 2	16	7	1	8	28	30	−2	22	
6	Amazon Grimstad	16	6	1	9	24	24	0	19	
7	Fana	16	4	5	7	17	31	−14	17	
8	Haugesund (Note: Haugesund merged with First Division club Avaldsnes and were relegated.) (R)	16	2	3	11	14	48	−34	9	Relegation to Third Division
9	Arendal (R)	16	3	0	13	13	49	−36	9	Relegation to Third Division
10	Nanset (Note: Nanset withdrew after round 9.) (R)	0	0	0	0	0	0	0	0	Relegation to Third Division

Source: Norwegian Football Federation (in Norwegian)
Rules for classification: 1) Points; 2) Goal difference; 3) Goals scored; 4) Head-to-head points; 5) Head-to-head goal difference; 6) Head-to-head goals scored.
(C) Champions; (P) Promoted; (R) Relegated

=== Results ===
Home \ Away	AMA	ARE	BRY	FAN	HAU	KLE	LYN	STA	STB
Amazon Grimstad	—	2–0	0–2	1–2	6–1	4–2	1–2	0–3	1–2
Arendal	0–2	—	2–1	1–0	0–1	1–7	5–0	0–3	0–1
Bryne	3–1	9–0	—	0–0	4–1	2–1	6–0	0–1	1–0
Fana	1–1	3–0	0–3	—	3–1	0–1	2–3	1–1	2–2
Haugesund	0–1	2–1	2–7	1–1	—	0–7	1–1	1–3	0–1
Klepp	1–0	4–1	3–2	6–0	4–1	—	1–0	2–1	6–2
Lyn 2	0–3	3–1	3–2	4–0	2–2	3–2	—	2–5	4–0
Start	2–0	6–0	2–1	6–0	4–0	5–1	3–0	—	5–2
Stabæk 2	3–1	5–1	2–3	0–2	3–0	0–1	4–0	1–3	—

Source: Norwegian Football Federation
Legend: Blue = home team win; Yellow = draw; Red = away team win.

== Group 2 ==
=== League table ===
Pos	Team	Pld	W	D	L	GF	GA	GD	Pts	Promotion, qualification or relegation
1	HamKam (C, P)	18	14	3	1	63	14	+49	45	Promotion to First Division
2	Grei	18	11	3	4	58	21	+37	36	Qualification for the promotion play-offs
3	Sogndal	18	8	5	5	34	27	+7	29	
4	Frigg	18	9	1	8	38	45	−7	28	
5	Vålerenga 2	18	6	6	6	32	44	−12	24	
6	Sarpsborg 08	18	6	3	9	37	41	−4	21	
7	Kongsvinger	18	5	5	8	32	38	−6	20	
8	Bjørnevatn	18	5	5	8	24	38	−14	20	
9	Røa 2 (Note: Røa 2 avoided relegation as the second best 9th-placed team.)	18	4	3	11	21	41	−20	15	
10	Porsanger (R)	18	3	4	11	22	52	−30	13	Relegation to Third Division

Source: Norwegian Football Federation (in Norwegian)
Rules for classification: 1) Points; 2) Goal difference; 3) Goals scored; 4) Head-to-head points; 5) Head-to-head goal difference; 6) Head-to-head goals scored.
(C) Champions; (P) Promoted; (R) Relegated

=== Results ===
Home \ Away	BJØ	FRI	GRE	HAM	KON	POR	RØA	SAR	SOG	VÅL
Bjørnevatn	—	1–1	1–2	0–4	1–0	2–1	0–1	5–3	1–1	1–0
Frigg	4–1	—	0–4	1–3	3–2	4–1	4–2	4–2	1–3	5–2
Grei	5–0	1–2	—	3–3	3–0	7–1	4–1	1–4	2–0	6–0
HamKam	2–2	6–1	5–1	—	3–0	8–0	2–1	2–0	2–1	1–2
Kongsvinger	5–0	2–1	1–1	0–2	—	1–1	1–1	3–2	2–1	2–2
Porsanger	2–1	1–2	2–1	0–5	3–3	—	1–2	4–1	1–3	1–1
Røa 2	0–2	1–2	0–3	0–7	2–4	1–1	—	2–0	1–2	1–3
Sarpsborg 08	1–0	6–1	0–6	1–3	5–2	3–1	1–1	—	1–1	2–2
Sogndal	3–3	3–0	1–1	0–4	4–2	3–0	3–2	0–3	—	4–0
Vålerenga 2	3–3	4–2	0–7	1–1	3–2	4–1	1–2	3–2	1–1	—

Source: Norwegian Football Federation
Legend: Blue = home team win; Yellow = draw; Red = away team win.

== Group 3 ==
=== League table ===
Pos	Team	Pld	W	D	L	GF	GA	GD	Pts	Promotion, qualification or relegation
1	Molde (C, P)	18	16	1	1	71	9	+62	49	Promotion to First Division
2	KFUM	18	8	6	4	33	21	+12	30	Qualification for the promotion play-offs
3	Tiller	18	8	6	4	31	29	+2	30	
4	Rosenborg 2	18	8	3	7	42	35	+7	27	
5	LSK Kvinner 2	18	7	4	7	32	36	−4	25	
6	Medkila	18	7	4	7	22	26	−4	25	
7	Mjølner (Note: Mjølner withdrew post-season.) (R)	18	6	3	9	34	42	−8	21	Relegation to Third Division
8	Lillestrøm	18	5	2	11	30	43	−13	17	
9	Steinkjer (Note: Steinkjer avoided relegation as the best 9th-placed team.)	18	5	1	12	26	49	−23	16	
10	Krokelvdalen (R)	18	3	4	11	22	53	−31	13	Relegation to Third Division

Source: Norwegian Football Federation (in Norwegian)
Rules for classification: 1) Points; 2) Goal difference; 3) Goals scored; 4) Head-to-head points; 5) Head-to-head goal difference; 6) Head-to-head goals scored.
(C) Champions; (P) Promoted; (R) Relegated

=== Results ===
Home \ Away	KFU	KRO	LIL	LSK	MED	MJØ	MOL	ROS	STE	TIL
KFUM	—	1–1	3–2	2–1	0–1	2–3	1–2	4–1	6–0	1–1
Krokelvdalen	0–0	—	3–5	3–2	1–1	0–3	0–4	3–1	2–4	1–2
Lillestrøm	2–3	1–1	—	1–2	1–2	4–1	0–4	0–3	1–0	2–2
LSK Kvinner 2	2–2	4–2	1–0	—	0–1	3–3	0–2	2–0	3–2	2–2
Medkila	0–1	3–0	3–0	1–1	—	1–1	0–1	3–6	3–1	0–1
Mjølner	0–0	4–1	1–7	3–2	0–2	—	1–2	3–0	4–1	1–4
Molde	3–0	8–0	7–0	6–2	5–0	1–0	—	6–0	9–0	6–0
Rosenborg 2	2–2	7–0	3–0	2–3	3–0	5–2	2–2	—	3–2	1–1
Steinkjer	0–2	1–4	1–3	3–0	4–1	3–1	0–3	1–0	—	2–2
Tiller	0–3	2–0	3–1	1–2	0–0	4–3	3–0	1–3	2–1	—

Source: Norwegian Football Federation
Legend: Blue = home team win; Yellow = draw; Red = away team win.

== Promotion play-offs ==
Pos	Team	Pld	W	D	L	GF	GA	GD	Pts	Qualification	KFU	KLE	GRE
1	KFUM	2	1	0	1	4	4	0	3	Qualification for the play-off final	—	3–1	—
2	Klepp	2	1	0	1	3	3	0	3		—	—	2–0
3	Grei	2	1	0	1	3	3	0	3		3–1	—	—

Source: Norwegian Football Federation (in Norwegian)
Rules for classification: 1) Points; 2) Goal difference; 3) Goals scored; 4) Head-to-head points; 5) Head-to-head goal difference; 6) Head-to-head goals scored.
