= Meryll Serrano =

Filipino footballer (born 1997)

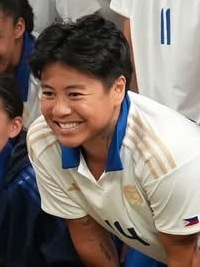
- Serrano in 2025

Personal information
- Full name: Maria Meryll Krysteen Rosales Serrano
- Date of birth: 20 July 1997 (age 29)
- Place of birth: Mangaldan, Pangasinan, Philippines
- Height: 1.68 m (5 ft 6 in)
- Position: Midfielder

Team information
- Current team: Haugesund
- Number: 7

Youth career
- –2012: Haugar

Senior career*
Years	Team	Apps	(Gls)
2012–2014	Haugar	48	(6)
2015–2018	Avaldsnes	55	(8)
2019	LSK Kvinner	13	(3)
2020–2022	Arna-Bjørnar	36	(7)
2023–2024	Stabæk	53	(5)
2025–	Haugesund	40	(10)

International career^{‡}
2012	Norway U15	2	(0)
2019	Norway U23	7	(2)
2022–	Philippines	30	(9)
Medal record
Women's football
Representing the Philippines
Southeast Asian Games
Gold medal – first place	2025 Thailand	Team
- * Club domestic league appearances and goals as of 31 October 2026 ‡ National team caps and goals as of 17 December 2025

Maria Meryll Krysteen Rosales Serrano (born 20 July 1997), known in Norway as Meryll Abrahamsen, is a Filipino professional footballer who plays as a midfielder for Toppserien club Haugesund and the Philippines women's national team.

== Career ==
=== Youth ===
Serrano had her youth career at Haugar.

=== Haugar ===
In 2012, as a 14-year-old, Serrano made her senior debut for Haugar in a 3–0 against Hinna.

=== Avaldsnes ===
After playing for three seasons in the Norwegian Second Division, Serrano joined Toppserien club Avaldsnes. She scored on her debut against Røa a minute and a half after coming in as a substitute. Avaldsnes finished their 2015 season as runners-up in both league and cup.

Avaldsnes ended up finishing as runners-up in the Toppserien for three consecutive seasons. In 2017, Serrano helped Avaldsnes to win the Norwegian Women's Cup, winning her first title in her senior career.

=== LSK Kvinner ===
In 2019, Serrano joined the Toppserien defending champions LSK Kvinner on a one-year deal. LSK Kvinner ended up winning the domestic double in the 2019 season.

=== Arna-Bjørnar ===
After spending a season with LSK, Serrano joined Toppserien club Arna-Bjørnar on a one-year deal. In 2020, Serrano extended her contract for one more season. She was once again offered a contract extension in 2021, signing a deal until the end of the 2022 season.

== International career ==
Serrano was born in the Philippines to Filipino parents and was raised in Norway, where her stepfather (surnamed Abrahamsen) is from, making her eligible to play for either Norway or Philippines at international level.

=== Norway U15 ===
In 2012, Serrano received a call-up from Norway women's under-15 football team. She made her debut for Norway U15 in a 4–3 win against Sweden U15, coming in as a substitute replacing Eline Glamsland in the 41st minute.

=== Norway U23 ===
In 2019 Serrano received a call-up from Norway women's under-23 football team for the friendlies against Italy U23, England U23 and France U23. She made her debut for Norway U23 in a 2–1 win against Italy U23, coming in as a substitute replacing Synne Jensen in the 89th minute. She scored her first goal for Norway U23 in a 3–2 win against England U23. More than a month later, she scored her second goal for Norway U23 in a 1–1 draw against China U23.

=== Philippines ===
Serrano was invited into the Philippines training camp in California. The training camp was part of the national team's preparation for the 2023 FIFA Women's World Cup.

In December 2022, Serrano scored her first senior international goal in a 5–1 friendly win against Papua New Guinea. By early August 2023, she had been capped 10 times for the Philippines, scoring four goals.

== Career statistics ==
=== Club ===
As of 31 October 2026

Appearances and goals by club, season and competition
Club	Season	League			Cup (Note: Includes Norwegian Cup)		Continental (Note: Includes UEFA Women's Champions League)		Other		Total	
Club	Season	Division	Apps	Goals	Apps	Goals	Apps	Goals	Apps	Goals	Apps	Goals
Haugar	2012	2. divisjon	12	1	1	0	—		—		13	1
Haugar	2013	2. divisjon	16	0	2	0	—		—		18	0
Haugar	2014	2. divisjon	20	5	2	0	—		—		22	5
Haugar	Total		48	6	5	0	0	0	0	0	53	6
Avaldsnes	2015	Toppserien	2	1	1	0	—		—		3	1
Avaldsnes	2016	Toppserien	14	1	2	1	1	0	—		17	2
Avaldsnes	2017	Toppserien	17	1	5	0	3	0	—		25	1
Avaldsnes	2018	Toppserien	22	5	2	1	5	1	—		29	7
Avaldsnes	Total		55	8	10	2	9	1	0	0	74	11
LSK Kvinner	2019	Toppserien	13	3	5	1	3	1	—		21	5
Arna-Bjørnar	2020	Toppserien	18	5	2	0	—		—		20	5
Arna-Bjørnar	2021	Toppserien	18	2	2	0	—		—		20	2
Arna-Bjørnar	2022	Toppserien	0	0	0	0	—		2	0	2	0
Arna-Bjørnar	Total		36	7	4	0	0	0	2	0	42	7
Stabæk	2023	Toppserien	26	4	1	0	—		—		27	4
Stabæk	2024	Toppserien	27	1	3	2	—		—		30	3
Stabæk	Total		53	5	4	2	0	0	0	0	57	7
Haugesund	2025	1. divisjon	22	10	0	0	—		—		22	10
Haugesund	2026	Toppserien	18	0	2	0	0	0	0	0	20	0
Haugesund	Total		40	10	2	0	0	0	0	0	42	10
Career total			245	38	30	5	12	2	2	0	289	45

=== International goals ===
Scores and results list the Philippines' goal tally first.

#	Date	Venue	Opponent	Score	Result	Competition
1.	11 December 2022	Wanderers Football Park, Sydney, Australia	Papua New Guinea	5–1	5–1	Friendly
2.	18 February 2023	Pinatar Arena, San Pedro del Pinatar, Spain	Scotland	1–2	1–2	2023 Pinatar Cup
3.	8 April 2023	Hisor Central Stadium, Hisor, Tajikistan	Tajikistan	5–0	8–0	2024 AFC Women's Olympic Qualifying Tournament
4.	11 April 2023	Hisor Central Stadium, Hisor, Tajikistan	Hong Kong	3–0	4–0	2024 AFC Women's Olympic Qualifying Tournament
5.	4 April 2025	Theyab Awana Stadium Dubai, United Arab Emirates	United Arab Emirates	3–0	4–1	Friendly
6.	29 June 2025	Olympic Stadium, Phnom Penh, Cambodia	Saudi Arabia	2–0	3–0	2026 AFC Women's Asian Cup qualification
7.	2 July 2025	Olympic Stadium, Phnom Penh, Cambodia	Cambodia	2–0	6–0	2026 AFC Women's Asian Cup qualification
8.	2 July 2025	Olympic Stadium, Phnom Penh, Cambodia	Cambodia	3–0	6–0	2026 AFC Women's Asian Cup qualification
9.	29 October 2025	Rizal Memorial Stadium, Manila, Philippines	Uzbekistan	2–0	2–2	Friendly

== Honors ==
Avaldsnes

- Toppserien runners-up: 2015, 2016, 2017
- Norwegian Women's Cup: 2017; runner-up: 2015

LSK Kvinner

- Toppserien: 2019
- Norwegian Women's Cup: 2019

Philippines

- Southeast Asian Games: 2025
