= Norwegian Second Division (women) =

- Country: Norway
- Confederation: UEFA
- Number of clubs: 24 (divided into 2 groups of 12)
- Level on pyramid: 3
- Promotion to: Norwegian First Division
- Relegation to: Norwegian Third Division
- Domestic cup: Norwegian Cup
- Current champions: Sarpsborg 08 (Group 1); HamKam (Group 2) (2026)
- Current: 2026 Norwegian Second Division (women)

The Norwegian Second Division (Norwegian: 2. divisjon) is the third highest level of women's football in Norway. It consists of 24 teams divided into two groups of 12 teams. The two group winners are promoted to the Norwegian First Division. The bottom two teams in each group are relegated to the Norwegian Third Division.

Reserve teams of Toppserien clubs can play in the Second Division but are ineligible for promotion to the First Division. Reserve teams of First Division clubs can not play in the Second Division.

== History ==
In June 2021, the Norwegian Football Federation decided to restructure the league. The 2023 season saw a reduction from 80 to 28 teams, and from eight to two groups.

In March 2024, it was decided to restructure the league again. The 2024 season consisted of 30 teams divided into three groups, while the following seasons would consist of 24 teams divided into two groups.

== List of promoted teams ==
Season	Promoted team(s)
2012	Kaupanger, Lyn
2013	Urædd, Øvrevoll Hosle
2014	Byåsen, Haugar
2015	Fløya, Raufoss
2016	Bossekop, KIL/Hemne
2017	Kaupanger, Nanset
2018	Hønefoss, Snøgg
2019	KIL/Hemne
2021	AaFK Fortuna, Grand Bodø
2022	Fyllingsdalen, Grei
2023	Viking, Odd
2024	Start, HamKam, Molde
