= 2025 Norwegian First Division (women) =

Association football season in Norway

Norwegian First Division
- Season: 2025
- Dates: 22 March – 18 October
- Champions: AaFK Fortuna
- Promoted: AaFK Fortuna; Haugesund; Molde
- Relegated: KIL/Hemne; HamKam
- Matches: 132
- Goals: 424 (3.21 per match)

The 2025 Norwegian First Division was a Norwegian second-tier women's football league season. The season started on 22 March 2025 and ended on 18 October 2025, not including play-off matches.

== Teams ==
Locations of teams in the 2025 Norwegian First Division
Locations of teams in the 2025 Norwegian First Division in Vestland

In the 2024 Norwegian First Division, Hønefoss and Bodø/Glimt were promoted to the 2025 Toppserien, while Øvrevoll Hosle were relegated to the 2025 Norwegian Second Division.

Åsane and Arna-Bjørnar were relegated from the 2024 Toppserien, while Start, HamKam and Molde were promoted from the 2024 Norwegian Second Division, expanding the First Division to 12 teams.

TIL 2020 and Avaldsnes both completed mergers with Eliteserien clubs ahead of the season, becoming the women's teams of Tromsø and Haugesund respectively.

=== Stadiums and locations ===
Team	Location	County	Arena	Turf	Capacity
AaFK Fortuna	Ålesund	Møre og Romsdal	Color Line Stadion	Artificial	10,778
Arna-Bjørnar	Bergen	Vestland	Arna Idrettspark	Artificial	1,500
Fyllingsdalen	Bergen	Vestland	Varden Amfi	Artificial	3,500
HamKam	Hamar	Innlandet	Briskeby	Artificial	7,800
Haugesund	Haugesund	Rogaland	Haugesund Sparebank Arena	Natural	8,754
KIL/Hemne	Heim	Trøndelag	Trøndelag Sparebank Arena	Artificial	500
Molde	Molde	Møre og Romsdal	Aker Stadion	Artificial	11,249
Odd	Skien	Telemark	Skagerak Arena	Artificial	11,767
Start	Kristiansand	Agder	Sparebanken Sør Arena	Artificial	14,448
Tromsø	Tromsø	Troms	Romssa Arena	Artificial	6,687
Viking	Stavanger	Rogaland	Lyse Arena	Artificial	15,900
Åsane	Bergen	Vestland	Åsane Arena	Artificial	3,300

=== Personnel and kits ===
Team	Manager(s)	Kit manufacturer	Shirt sponsor
AaFK Fortuna	(Norway) Karl Oskar Fjørtoft	Umbro	Sparebanken Møre
Arna-Bjørnar	(Norway) Erik Mjelde	Nike	Sparebanken Vest
Fyllingsdalen	(Norway) Børge Haugsdal	Umbro	Sparebanken Vest
HamKam	(Scotland) Nathan Flight	Puma	SpareBank 1 Østlandet
Haugesund	(Norway) Per Øyvind Mortveit (Norway) Ole-Petter Pedersen Bremstein	Umbro	Sparebanken Vest
KIL/Hemne	(Norway) Erik Svendsen	Umbro	Trøndelag Sparebank
Molde	(Norway) Kent Rudning	Adidas	Sparebanken Møre
Odd	(Norway) Erik Waage	Hummel	Skagerak Energi
Start	(England) Isabella Hayes Sunde	Macron	Sparebanken Sør
Tromsø	(Norway) Mikael Raimo Johnsen	Select	SpareBank 1 Nord-Norge
Viking	(Norway) Magnus Meling	Diadora	Lyse
Åsane	(Spain) Miki Lladó	Craft	Tertnes Holding

== League table ==
Pos	Team	Pld	W	D	L	GF	GA	GD	Pts	Promotion, qualification or relegation
1	AaFK Fortuna (C, P)	22	15	6	1	54	15	+39	51	Promotion to Toppserien
2	Haugesund (P)	22	14	4	4	53	26	+27	46	Promotion to Toppserien
3	Molde (P)	22	13	5	4	54	32	+22	44	Promotion to Toppserien
4	Åsane	22	11	5	6	40	23	+17	38	Qualification for the promotion play-offs
5	Arna-Bjørnar	22	10	6	6	42	35	+7	36	
6	Tromsø	22	7	5	10	39	45	−6	26	
7	Fyllingsdalen	22	7	5	10	28	38	−10	26	
8	Start	22	6	7	9	23	31	−8	25	
9	Odd	22	7	4	11	29	41	−12	25	
10	Viking	22	7	4	11	30	45	−15	25	
11	KIL/Hemne (R)	22	3	6	13	19	46	−27	15	Qualification for the relegation play-offs
12	HamKam (R)	22	3	1	18	13	47	−34	10	Relegation to Second Division

Source: Norwegian Football Federation (in Norwegian)
Rules for classification: 1) Points; 2) Goal difference; 3) Goals scored; 4) Head-to-head points; 5) Head-to-head goal difference; 6) Head-to-head goals scored.
(C) Champions; (P) Promoted; (R) Relegated

== Positions by round ==
Team ╲ Round	1	2	3	4	5	6	7	8	9	10	11	12	13	14	15	16	17	18	19	20	21	22
AaFK Fortuna	4	4	2	1	2	3	3	3	2	1	1	1	1	1	1	2	2	2	2	2	1	1
Haugesund	8	7	8	4	4	5	7	4	5	4	4	3	2	2	2	1	1	1	1	1	2	2
Molde	2	1	1	5	3	1	1	1	1	2	3	2	3	3	3	3	3	4	3	3	3	3
Åsane	4	4	6	3	6	4	2	2	3	3	2	4	4	4	4	4	4	3	4	4	4	4
Arna-Bjørnar	11	8	4	2	1	2	5	6	4	6	5	5	5	5	5	5	5	5	5	5	5	5
Tromsø	12	12	12	12	12	12	11	11	11	11	9	10	10	10	10	10	10	10	10	10	8	6
Fyllingsdalen	6	3	5	8	9	7	6	7	7	7	7	7	7	7	8	7	6	6	6	6	6	7
Start	1	6	7	7	7	8	8	8	10	9	8	9	9	8	9	9	9	8	9	9	9	8
Odd	3	2	3	6	5	6	4	5	6	5	6	6	6	6	6	6	7	7	7	8	10	9
Viking	9	10	9	9	8	10	10	9	8	8	10	8	8	9	7	8	8	9	8	7	7	10
KIL/Hemne	9	11	11	10	10	9	9	10	9	10	11	11	11	11	12	12	11	11	11	11	11	11
HamKam	6	9	10	11	11	11	12	12	12	12	12	12	12	12	11	11	12	12	12	12	12	12

Promotion to 2026 Toppserien
Promotion play-offs
Relegation play-offs
Relegation to 2026 Second Division

Source: nifs.no

== Results ==
Home \ Away	AAF	ARN	FYL	HAM	HAU	KIL	MOL	ODD	STA	TRO	VIK	ÅSA
AaFK Fortuna		3–1	4–0	4–0	1–1	1–1	2–2	2–1	4–0	4–1	1–0	2–0
Arna-Bjørnar	1–1		1–0	2–0	3–3	4–0	3–2	4–2	1–1	5–5	1–0	0–3
Fyllingsdalen	1–2	2–0		3–2	1–2	0–2	1–1	1–2	1–0	2–0	3–1	0–0
HamKam	0–2	0–4	1–1		0–1	3–0	1–3	0–2	1–0	1–4	0–2	0–3
Haugesund	2–1	4–2	4–1	0–2		2–0	3–1	4–0	2–3	3–1	2–1	2–0
KIL/Hemne	0–3	1–2	4–0	2–1	1–5		1–1	1–1	0–0	0–0	1–1	0–1
Molde	0–3	3–1	2–2	1–0	2–1	4–1		3–1	4–1	4–2	4–1	3–1
Odd	2–5	0–3	1–3	2–0	2–1	4–1	1–1		0–2	1–1	1–2	0–0
Start	2–2	0–1	1–1	1–0	1–1	2–0	3–1	0–1		4–1	0–1	0–3
Tromsø	0–2	2–0	2–4	4–0	1–4	3–0	1–3	3–1	1–1		1–1	5–1
Viking	0–5	1–1	3–1	2–1	0–4	5–1	1–6	2–4	1–1	1–2		2–1
Åsane	0–0	2–2	3–0	4–0	2–2	3–2	1–3	2–0	3–0	3–0	4–1	

Updated to match(es) played on 19 October 2025. Source: (in Norwegian)
Legend: Blue = home team win; Yellow = draw; Red = away team win.

== Relegation play-offs ==
19 November 2025
16:30 CET

Bryne	0–1	KIL/Hemne
	Report	Bjerksæter 6'

Aarbakkebanen, Bryne
Referee: Shahad Emad Al-Rantisi
23 November 2025
13:00 CET

KIL/Hemne	2–3 (a.e.t.)	Bryne
Flaa 7'; Bjerksæter 108'	Report	Øfsteng 26'; Sivertsen 57', 95'
Penalties
	1–4

Sodvinhallen, Kyrksæterøra
Referee: Bendik Haarberg

3–3 on aggregate. Bryne won 4–1 on penalties and were promoted. KIL/Hemne were relegated.

== Top scorers ==
Rank	Player	Club	Goals
1	(Norway) Katarina Dybvik Sunde	AaFK Fortuna	22
2	(Norway) Kristina Svandal	Haugesund	18
3	(Switzerland) Chiara Messerli	Molde	14
4	(South Korea) Jeon Yu-gyeong	Molde	11
5	(Philippines) Meryll Abrahamsen	Haugesund	10
6	(Norway) Marie Myhrvold Seim	Åsane	9
6	(Norway) Maria Brochmann	Åsane	9
6	(Norway) Hannah Aurbekkholen	Odd	9
6	(Norway) Vilde Drange Veglo	Tromsø	9
10	(Norway) Vilde Vedeler	Arna-Bjørnar	8
10	(Finland) Silja Tuominen	Molde	8
