= 2017 Norwegian Third Division =

3. divisjon
- Season: 2017
- Champions: Moss; Stabæk 2; Fløy; Brattvåg; Stjørdals-Blink; Mjølner
- Promoted: Moss; Stabæk 2; Fløy; Brattvåg; Stjørdals-Blink; Mjølner
- Relegated: 24 teams
- Top goalscorer: Tobias Lauritsen (32 goals)

The 2017 season of the 3. divisjon, the fourth highest association football league for men in Norway.

26 games were played in 6 groups, with 3 points given for wins and 1 for draws. 6 group winners were promoted to the 2. divisjon.

== League tables ==
=== Group 1 ===
Pos	Team	Pld	W	D	L	GF	GA	GD	Pts	Promotion or relegation
1	Moss (P)	26	20	3	3	88	22	+66	63	Promotion to Second Division
2	Ørn Horten	26	16	4	6	60	29	+31	52	
3	Kvik Halden	26	15	4	7	77	36	+41	49	
4	Oppsal	26	14	3	9	58	49	+9	45	
5	Kråkerøy	26	12	4	10	35	35	0	40	
6	Vestfossen	26	13	1	12	46	49	−3	40	
7	Ullern	26	11	6	9	40	38	+2	39	
8	Drøbak/Frogn	26	10	6	10	56	53	+3	36	
9	Strømsgodset 2	26	11	3	12	48	56	−8	36	
10	Østsiden	26	10	5	11	54	44	+10	35	
11	Sarpsborg 08 2 (R)	26	10	5	11	55	54	+1	35	Relegation to Fourth Division
12	Sprint-Jeløy (R)	26	8	2	16	36	62	−26	26	Relegation to Fourth Division
13	Holmen (R)	26	4	5	17	22	65	−43	17	Relegation to Fourth Division
14	Odd 3 (R)	26	2	1	23	28	111	−83	7	Relegation to Fourth Division

Source: NIFS (in Norwegian)
Rules for classification: 1) Points; 2) Goal difference; 3) Goals scored; 4) Head-to-head points; 5) Head-to-head goal difference; 6) Head-to-head goals scored.
(P) Promoted; (R) Relegated

=== Group 2 ===
Pos	Team	Pld	W	D	L	GF	GA	GD	Pts	Promotion or relegation
1	Stabæk 2 (P)	26	21	0	5	98	25	+73	63	Promotion to Second Division
2	Lyn	26	20	3	3	71	35	+36	62 (Note: Lyn have been deducted 1 point due to the use of an ineligible player.)	
3	Eidsvold Turn	26	19	1	6	60	24	+36	58	
4	Korsvoll	26	14	4	8	51	38	+13	46	
5	Tynset	26	12	2	12	37	49	−12	38	
6	Frigg	26	11	3	12	55	44	+11	36	
7	Gjøvik-Lyn	26	10	4	12	47	61	−14	34	
8	Valdres	26	10	3	13	39	43	−4	33	
9	Lokomotiv Oslo	26	9	6	11	36	44	−8	33	
10	Ready	26	9	3	14	43	56	−13	30	
11	Lillehammer (R)	26	8	5	13	54	57	−3	29	Relegation to Fourth Division
12	Flisa (R)	26	6	3	17	32	76	−44	21	Relegation to Fourth Division
13	Raufoss 2 (R)	26	5	5	16	32	58	−26	20	Relegation to Fourth Division
14	Redalen (R)	26	4	6	16	34	79	−45	18	Relegation to Fourth Division

Source: NIFS (in Norwegian)
Rules for classification: 1) Points; 2) Goal difference; 3) Goals scored; 4) Head-to-head points; 5) Head-to-head goal difference; 6) Head-to-head goals scored.
(P) Promoted; (R) Relegated

=== Group 3 ===
Pos	Team	Pld	W	D	L	GF	GA	GD	Pts	Promotion or relegation
1	Fløy (P)	26	21	2	3	76	29	+47	65	Promotion to Second Division
2	Pors	26	16	3	7	84	43	+41	51	
3	Madla	26	12	6	8	52	48	+4	42	
4	Tønsberg	26	11	7	8	48	41	+7	40	
5	Sola	26	11	5	10	46	35	+11	38	
6	Viking 2	26	11	4	11	52	53	−1	37	
7	Start 2	26	11	3	12	49	43	+6	36	
8	Halsen	26	11	2	13	61	69	−8	35	
9	Staal Jørpeland	26	10	3	13	59	63	−4	33	
10	Brodd	26	9	6	11	47	53	−6	33	
11	Sandnes Ulf 2 (R)	26	9	4	13	50	59	−9	31	Relegation to Fourth Division
12	Lura (R)	26	8	6	12	36	52	−16	30	Relegation to Fourth Division
13	Bryne 2 (R)	26	8	6	12	41	70	−29	30	Relegation to Fourth Division
14	Express (R)	26	3	5	18	28	71	−43	14	Relegation to Fourth Division

Source: NIFS (in Norwegian)
Rules for classification: 1) Points; 2) Goal difference; 3) Goals scored; 4) Head-to-head points; 5) Head-to-head goal difference; 6) Head-to-head goals scored.
(P) Promoted; (R) Relegated

=== Group 4 ===
Pos	Team	Pld	W	D	L	GF	GA	GD	Pts	Promotion or relegation
1	Brattvåg (P)	26	17	5	4	78	27	+51	56	Promotion to Second Division
2	Lysekloster	26	17	5	4	55	32	+23	56	
3	Herd	26	12	6	8	57	48	+9	42	
4	Fyllingsdalen	26	12	5	9	61	50	+11	41	
5	Sotra	26	12	5	9	52	43	+9	41	
6	Varegg	26	12	4	10	51	54	−3	40	
7	Spjelkavik	26	8	11	7	45	44	+1	35	
8	Førde	26	9	7	10	47	49	−2	34	
9	Brann 2	26	8	6	12	48	47	+1	30	
10	Stord	26	8	6	12	48	58	−10	30	
11	Os (R)	26	8	6	12	45	55	−10	30	Relegation to Fourth Division
12	Haugesund 2 (R)	26	7	6	13	37	60	−23	27	Relegation to Fourth Division
13	Fjøra (R)	26	7	5	14	41	73	−32	26	Relegation to Fourth Division
14	Aalesund 2 (R)	26	4	5	17	35	60	−25	17	Relegation to Fourth Division

Source: NIFS (in Norwegian)
Rules for classification: 1) Points; 2) Goal difference; 3) Goals scored; 4) Head-to-head points; 5) Head-to-head goal difference; 6) Head-to-head goals scored.
(P) Promoted; (R) Relegated

=== Group 5 ===
Pos	Team	Pld	W	D	L	GF	GA	GD	Pts	Promotion or relegation
1	Stjørdals-Blink (P)	26	19	2	5	81	45	+36	59	Promotion to Second Division
2	Kolstad	26	13	4	9	66	53	+13	43	
3	Steinkjer	26	12	4	10	65	61	+4	40	
4	Junkeren	26	11	6	9	61	59	+2	39	
5	Rosenborg 2	26	10	7	9	68	43	+25	37	
6	Orkla	26	10	7	9	54	51	+3	37	
7	Molde 2	26	12	1	13	52	53	−1	37	
8	Verdal	26	9	10	7	43	44	−1	37	
9	Træff	26	10	6	10	45	48	−3	36	
10	Tillerbyen	26	10	5	11	47	50	−3	35	
11	Mo (R)	26	10	4	12	54	63	−9	34	Relegation to Fourth Division
12	Strindheim (R)	26	9	5	12	53	64	−11	32	Relegation to Fourth Division
13	Sverresborg (R)	26	6	5	15	56	78	−22	23	Relegation to Fourth Division
14	Mosjøen (R)	26	6	4	16	41	74	−33	22	Relegation to Fourth Division

Source: NIFS (in Norwegian)
Rules for classification: 1) Points; 2) Goal difference; 3) Goals scored; 4) Head-to-head points; 5) Head-to-head goal difference; 6) Head-to-head goals scored.
(P) Promoted; (R) Relegated

=== Group 6 ===
Pos	Team	Pld	W	D	L	GF	GA	GD	Pts	Promotion or relegation
1	Mjølner (P)	26	20	2	4	72	31	+41	62	Promotion to Second Division
2	Senja	26	17	0	9	63	33	+30	51	
3	Sortland	26	14	3	9	48	42	+6	45	
4	Skjetten	26	13	3	10	46	43	+3	42	
5	Lørenskog	26	12	5	9	54	36	+18	41	
6	Harstad	26	11	6	9	44	39	+5	39	
7	Skjervøy	26	11	4	11	58	65	−7	37	
8	Fløya	26	9	8	9	42	39	+3	35	
9	Lillestrøm 2	26	10	5	11	43	43	0	35	
10	Skedsmo	26	9	8	9	39	41	−2	35	
11	Fu/Vo (R)	26	10	5	11	46	50	−4	35	Relegation to Fourth Division
12	Tromsø 2 (R)	26	6	6	14	42	64	−22	24	Relegation to Fourth Division
13	Alta 2 (R)	26	5	3	18	23	64	−41	18	Relegation to Fourth Division
14	Salangen (R)	26	5	2	19	43	73	−30	17	Relegation to Fourth Division

Source: NIFS (in Norwegian)
Rules for classification: 1) Points; 2) Goal difference; 3) Goals scored; 4) Head-to-head points; 5) Head-to-head goal difference; 6) Head-to-head goals scored.
(P) Promoted; (R) Relegated

== Top scorers ==
Rank	Player	Club	Goals
1	(Norway) Tobias Lauritsen	Pors	32
2	(Norway) Sondre Hopmark Stokke	Stjørdals-Blink	31
3	(Norway) Erik Bjørkli Helgetun	Orkla	26
4	(Sweden) Björn Olof Berglund	Kvik Halden	25
4	(Norway) Øystein Lundblad Næsheim	Kvik Halden	25
4	(Norway) Sebastian Pedersen	Stabæk 2	25
4	(Norway) Ivar Johannes Unhjem	Junkeren	25
8	(Norway) Dardan Dreshaj	Fløy	24
9	(Norway) Jonas Tømmerdal Frøner	Sverresborg	23
9	(Norway) Tobias Hem	Halsen	23
9	(Norway) Even Østensen	Staal Jørpeland	23
