= Aalesunds FK (women) =

Norwegian football club

- Founded: 25 August 1991; 35 years ago, as FK Fortuna Ålesund; 25 June 1914; 112 years ago, as Aalesunds FK
- Ground: Aksla Stadion; Color Line Stadion
- Head coach: Martin Lindmark
- League: Toppserien
- 2026: 2nd
- Website: https://aafkfortuna.no/
| Home colours | Away colours |

Aalesunds FK (formerly known as FK Fortuna Ålesund and AaFK Fortuna) is a Norwegian women's football club from Ålesund that currently competes in Toppserien, the first tier of Norwegian football.

== History ==
Former logo of FK Fortuna Ålesund

The club was founded on 25 August 1991 by outbreakers from SK Guard, and merged with Spjelkavik IL in 1995. They played as Spjelkavik IL/Fortuna in the 1995 season, and was named FK Fortuna Ålesund in 1996. The club's home grounds are Aksla Stadion and (sometimes) Color Line Stadion.

After playing 1995–2008 at the second level, the club was promoted and debuted in the 2009 Toppserien, but finished in last position and was relegated. Fortuna was in the second tier in the period 2010–16 and has played in the third tier since 2017.

Among several coaches, Tone Haugen was playing coach and captain 2000–03 and the ex-Icelandic national team coach Helena Ólafsdóttir was coach for Fortuna 2015–16.

=== Aalesunds FK agreement and subsequent merger ===
Ahead of the 2020 season, Fortuna Ålesund agreed to a three-year cooperation agreement with Aalesunds FK (AaFK). One of the goals are to develop women's football in Ålesund and eventually merge Fortuna with AaFK. As part of the agreement, the team changed its name to AaFK Fortuna and will play with Aalesunds FK's orange and blue kit and use AaFK's logo. Ahead of the 2026 season AaFK Fortuna was fully merged into Aalesunds FK, becoming the club's women's team.

== Current squad ==
As of 15 May 2024

Note: Flags indicate national team as defined under FIFA eligibility rules; some limited exceptions apply. Players may hold more than one non-FIFA nationality.

| No. | Pos. | Nation | Player |
|---|---|---|---|
| 1 | GK | USA | Michaela Moran |
| 2 | DF | NOR | Anna Constance Blindheim |
| 3 | DF | NOR | Mette Muri (captain) |
| 4 | DF | NOR | Madelen Eid |
| 5 | DF | DEN | Sofie Riis |
| 6 | DF | NOR | Ingrid Rame |
| 7 | MF | NOR | Linn Huseby |
| 8 | MF | NOR | Ingeborg Skretting |
| 9 | DF | ISL | Daníela Dögg Guðnadóttir |
| 10 | MF | NOR | Laura Gashi |
| 11 | FW | NOR | Guro Hammer Røn |
| 12 | GK | NOR | Idun Jørgensen |

| No. | Pos. | Nation | Player |
|---|---|---|---|
| 13 | GK | NOR | Lone Vartdal Forberg |
| 15 | DF | NOR | Helle Olsen Rindal |
| 17 | FW | NOR | Amalie Ervik Røys |
| 18 | MF | NOR | Ingrid Jåstad |
| 19 | FW | DEN | Maria Herdel |
| 20 | FW | NOR | Hanna Bråten |
| 21 | FW | NOR | Karna Solskjær |
| 22 | MF | POL | Agata Droździk |
| 24 | GK | NOR | Nathalie Eide |
| 25 | MF | NOR | Serah Senior-Hårvik |
| 30 | GK | NOR | Sara Holte |

== Recent seasons ==
| Season | | Pos. | Pl. | W | D | L | GS | GA | P | Cup | Notes |
|---|---|---|---|---|---|---|---|---|---|---|---|
| 2000 | 1. divisjon | 1 | 18 | 16 | 1 | 1 | 96 | 24 | 49 | Third round | Lost promotion play-offs |
| 2001 | 1. divisjon | 6 | 16 | 6 | 2 | 8 | 34 | 33 | 20 | Third round | |
| 2002 | 1. divisjon | 6 | 16 | 6 | 2 | 8 | 21 | 28 | 20 | Quarter-finals | |
| 2003 | 1. divisjon | 6 | 18 | 7 | 4 | 7 | 32 | 29 | 25 | Third round | |
| 2004 | 1. divisjon | 5 | 18 | 9 | 0 | 9 | 49 | 57 | 27 | Third round | |
| 2005 | 1. divisjon | 5 | 18 | 7 | 4 | 7 | 29 | 29 | 25 | Quarter-finals | |
| 2006 | 1. divisjon | 6 | 18 | 7 | 3 | 8 | 25 | 32 | 24 | Second round | |
| 2007 | 1. divisjon | 4 | 18 | 8 | 3 | 7 | 31 | 23 | 27 | Third round | |
| 2008 | 1. divisjon | ↑ 2 | 18 | 8 | 4 | 6 | 32 | 22 | 28 | Quarter-finals | Promoted |
| 2009 | Toppserien | ↓ 12 | 22 | 0 | 3 | 19 | 18 | 87 | 3 | Third round | Relegated |
| 2010 | 1. divisjon | 4 | 22 | 11 | 4 | 7 | 45 | 32 | 37 | Third round | |
| 2011 | 1. divisjon | 7 | 20 | 7 | 2 | 11 | 42 | 52 | 23 | Third round | |
| 2012 | 1. divisjon | 9 | 22 | 7 | 3 | 12 | 35 | 54 | 24 | Second Round | |
| 2013 | 1. divisjon | 7 | 20 | 8 | 5 | 7 | 38 | 35 | 29 | Third round | |
| 2014 | 1. divisjon | 4 | 22 | 11 | 4 | 7 | 44 | 32 | 37 | Third round | |
| 2015 | 1. divisjon | 9 | 22 | 6 | 4 | 12 | 30 | 51 | 22 | Third round | |
| 2016 | 1. divisjon | ↓ 11 | 22 | 4 | 5 | 13 | 25 | 53 | 17 | First round | Relegated |
| 2017 | 2. divisjon | 1 | 18 | 14 | 3 | 1 | 64 | 20 | 45 | Second round | Lost promotion play-offs |
| 2018 | 2. divisjon | 1 | 18 | 13 | 3 | 2 | 60 | 13 | 42 | Second round | Lost promotion play-offs |
| 2019 | 2. divisjon | 2 | 16 | 12 | 1 | 3 | 73 | 16 | 37 | Third round | |
| 2020 | No season due to Corona Virus Pandemic | | | | | | | | | | |
| 2021 | 2. divisjon | ↑ 1 | 9 | 9 | 0 | 0 | 41 | 2 | 27 | Third round | Promoted |
| 2022 | 1. divisjon | 6 | 18 | 8 | 1 | 9 | 33 | 34 | 25 | Third round | |
| 2023 | 1. divisjon | 2 | 18 | 12 | 1 | 5 | 44 | 27 | 37 | Third round | Lost promotion play-offs |
| 2024 | 1. divisjon | 2 | 18 | 12 | 4 | 2 | 45 | 10 | 40 | Quarter-finals | Lost promotion play-offs |
| 2025 | 1. divisjon | ↑ 1 | 22 | 15 | 6 | 1 | 54 | 15 | 51 | Third round | Promoted |
| 2026 | Toppserien | 2 | 22 | 16 | 2 | 4 | 48 | 21 | 50 | Runners-Up | |

== Coaches ==
Fortuna Ålesund coaches from the 2000 season to present
- (Norway) Tone Haugen (1999 – 2003)
- (Norway) Magne Kvalø (2004 – 2006)
- (Norway) Svein Slinning (2007 – 2009)
- (Norway) Karl Oskar Fjørtoft (2010)
- (Norway) Ronny Ødegård (2011)
- (Norway) Magne Elde (2012 – 2014)
- (Iceland) Helena Ólafsdóttir (2015 – April 2016)
- (Norway) Svein Arne Sunde (April 2016 – November 2016)
- (Norway) Magne Elde (2017 – ?)
- (Norway) Karl Oskar Fjørtoft (? – summer 2025)
- (Norway) Martin Lindmark (November 2025–)
