= 2026 Toppserien =

43rd season of top women's association football league in Norway

Toppserien
- Season: 2026
- Dates: 20 March – 7 November
- Champions: Brann (4th title)
- Relegated: LSK Kvinner; Bodø/Glimt
- Champions League: Brann; Aalesund
- Europa Cup: Rosenborg
- Matches: 132
- Goals: 427 (3.23 per match)
- Best player: Katarina Dybvik Sunde
- Top goalscorer: Katarina Dybvik Sunde (28 goals)
- Best goalkeeper: Sunniva Skoglund (10 clean sheets)
- Biggest home win: Lyn 9–0 Bodø/Glimt (25 April 2026)
- Biggest away win: Haugesund 0–7 Brann (15 May 2026)
- Highest scoring: Lyn 9–0 Bodø/Glimt (25 April 2026) Aalesund 8–1 Bodø/Glimt (20 June 2026) Røa 3–6 Vålerenga (11 September 2026)
- Longest winning run: 9 matches Brann
- Longest unbeaten run: 17 matches Brann
- Longest winless run: 16 matches Bodø/Glimt
- Longest losing run: 11 matches Bodø/Glimt
- Highest attendance: 4,816; Brann 2–0 Molde (7 November 2026)
- Lowest attendance: 209; Røa 0–1 Rosenborg (2 May 2026)
- Total attendance: 102,032
- Average attendance: 779

The 2026 Toppserien was the 43rd season of the highest women's football league in Norway. The season ran from 20 March to 7 November 2026, not including play-off matches. Brann were the defending champions.

Brann clinched their back-to-back championship title in the penultimate round with a 4–1 win against LSK Kvinner, their fourth title overall. Aalesund were the runners-up, securing a spot in the Champions League second qualifying round in their first season after promotion. Rosenborg placed 3rd, which qualifies them for the Europa Cup first qualifying round.

All three of the newly promoted teams – Aalesund, Haugesund and Molde – avoided relegation and will play in the 2027 Toppserien. Placing 12th, Bodø/Glimt were relegated after two seasons. Ending in 11th place, LSK Kvinner suffered their first-ever relegation, having been present in the top flight in some form since the founding of the league in 1984. Røa placed 10th and are facing Arna-Bjørnar from the First Division in the relegation play-off.

== Teams ==
Locations of the teams in the 2026 Toppserien

For the 2026 season, the league was expanded back to 12 teams, from the previous season's 10. The three clubs Aalesund, Haugesund and Molde were promoted from the 2025 First Division, while Kolbotn were the only club relegated from the 2025 Toppserien.

=== Stadiums and locations ===
Team	Ap.	Location	County	Arena	Turf	Capacity
Aalesund	2	Ålesund	Møre og Romsdal	Color Line Stadion	Artificial	10,778
Bodø/Glimt	2	Bodø	Nordland	Aspmyra Stadion	Artificial	8,300
Brann	36	Bergen	Vestland	Brann Stadion	Natural	17,500
Haugesund	12	Haugesund	Rogaland	Haugesund Sparebank Arena	Artificial	8,703
Hønefoss	2	Hønefoss	Buskerud	Aka Arena	Artificial	4,120
LSK Kvinner	43	Lillestrøm	Akershus	Strømmen Stadion	Artificial	2,000
Lyn	9	Oslo	Oslo	Kringsjå Kunstgress	Artificial	450
Molde	2	Molde	Møre og Romsdal	Aker Stadion	Artificial	11,249
Rosenborg	43	Trondheim	Trøndelag	Koteng Arena	Artificial	895
Røa	25	Oslo	Oslo	Røa Kunstgress	Artificial	450
Stabæk	17	Bærum	Akershus	Nadderud Stadion	Artificial	4,938
Vålerenga	15	Oslo	Oslo	Intility Arena	Artificial	16,556

=== Personnel and kits ===
Team	Manager	Captain	Kit manufacturer	Shirt sponsor
Aalesund	(Norway) Martin Lindmark	(Norway) Mette Muri	Umbro	Sparebanken Møre
Bodø/Glimt	(Norway) Øyvind Tjelde Haga	(Norway) Veronika Sæthre	Puma	SpareBank 1 Nord-Norge
Brann	(England) Laura Kaminski	(Norway) Karoline Haugland	Nike	Sparebanken Norge
Haugesund	(Norway) Ole-Petter Bremstein	(Norway) Kristine Nybru	Umbro	Haugaland Kraft
Hønefoss	(Norway) Remi Natvik	(Norway) Silje Nyhagen	Select	Barnekreftforeningen
LSK Kvinner	(Sweden) Martin Broberg (caretaker)	(Norway) Mille Ivi Christensen	Puma	OBOS
Lyn	(Norway) August Nyland	(Norway) Kirvil Odden	Hummel	OBOS
Molde	(Sweden) Per Gidlund (caretaker)	(Norway) Tora Ose	Adidas	Sparebanken Møre
Rosenborg	(Northern Ireland) Robin Shroot	(Norway) Synne Aunehaugen	Adidas	SpareBank 1 SMN
Røa	(Norway) Fredrik Sæland	(Norway) Sarah Suphellen	Diadora	OBOS
Stabæk	(England) Luke Torjussen	(Norway) Eline Hegg	Nike	SpareBank 1 Østlandet
Vålerenga	(Norway) Nils Lexerød	(Sweden) Tove Enblom	Adidas	OBOS

=== Managerial changes ===
Team	Outgoing manager	Manner of departure	Date of vacancy	Position in the table	Incoming manager	Date of appointment
Aalesund	(Norway) Ruben Aalberg (caretaker)	End of caretaker period	4 November 2025	Pre-season	(Norway) Martin Lindmark	4 November 2025
Hønefoss	(Norway) Martin Lindmark	Signed by Aalesund	4 November 2025	Pre-season	(Norway) Remi Natvik	15 December 2025
Stabæk	(Sweden) Jan Jönsson	Mutual consent	15 November 2025	Pre-season	(England) Luke Torjussen	1 January 2026
Røa	(Norway) Geir Nordby	Retired	22 November 2025	Pre-season	(Norway) Fredrik Sæland	8 January 2026
Brann	(Norway) Leif Gunnar Smerud	Sacked	25 November 2025	Pre-season	(England) Laura Kaminski	8 January 2026
LSK Kvinner	(Norway) André Bergdølmo	Mutual consent	21 June 2026	8	(Sweden) Martin Broberg (caretaker)	21 June 2026
Bodø/Glimt	(Norway) Cato André Hansen	Sacked	25 June 2026	12	(Norway) Øyvind Tjelde Haga	16 July 2026
Molde	(Norway) Kent Rudning	Sacked	6 October 2026	7	(Sweden) Per Gidlund (caretaker)	6 October 2026

== League table ==
The league consists of 12 teams who play each other twice, totalling 22 matches per team.

Pos	Team	Pld	W	D	L	GF	GA	GD	Pts	Qualification or relegation
1	Brann (C)	22	18	3	1	62	8	+54	57	Qualification for the Champions League second qualifying round
2	Aalesund	22	16	2	4	48	21	+27	50	Qualification for the Champions League second qualifying round
3	Rosenborg	22	14	6	2	44	21	+23	48	Qualification for the Europa Cup first qualifying round
4	Vålerenga	22	14	2	6	55	26	+29	44	
5	Lyn	22	10	5	7	43	32	+11	35	
6	Stabæk	22	9	3	10	39	26	+13	30	
7	Haugesund	22	8	3	11	30	46	−16	27	
8	Hønefoss	22	6	5	11	19	33	−14	23	
9	Molde	22	6	3	13	27	43	−16	21	
10	Røa	22	4	5	13	20	46	−26	17	Qualification for relegation play-offs
11	LSK Kvinner (R)	22	4	4	14	26	46	−20	16	Relegation to First Division
12	Bodø/Glimt (R)	22	1	3	18	14	79	−65	6	Relegation to First Division

Source: Norwegian Football Federation (in Norwegian)
Rules for classification: 1) Points; 2) Most matches played; 3) Goal difference; 4) Number of goals scored; 5) Head-to-head points; 6) Head-to-head goal difference; 7) Head-to-head away goals scored; 8) Play-off
(C) Champions; (R) Relegated

== Results ==
Home \ Away	AAL	BOD	BRA	HAU	HØN	LSK	LYN	MOL	ROS	RØA	STA	VÅL
Aalesund	—	8–1	1–2	5–1	2–0	3–0	1–0	4–1	1–0	1–0	2–2	0–3
Bodø/Glimt	0–2	—	1–4	1–2	0–0	0–6	1–4	1–2	0–2	2–1	0–4	1–4
Brann	1–2	4–0	—	2–0	6–0	0–0	4–0	2–0	1–1	5–1	1–0	1–0
Haugesund	3–1	2–1	0–7	—	0–1	2–1	0–3	2–0	0–1	2–1	1–1	2–4
Hønefoss	0–1	3–0	0–3	2–3	—	1–1	1–0	3–1	0–2	0–0	1–2	0–3
LSK Kvinner	0–3	1–1	1–4	2–1	3–2	—	2–3	1–3	1–2	1–3	0–3	0–3
Lyn	1–2	9–0	0–3	4–3	1–1	1–1	—	2–1	4–4	0–0	3–1	2–0
Molde	2–3	3–1	0–5	3–3	0–1	1–0	0–0	—	2–3	4–0	0–3	0–4
Rosenborg	1–1	3–0	1–1	1–1	2–0	0–1	3–2	1–0	—	6–0	4–2	3–2
Røa	2–3	1–1	0–2	0–1	1–1	2–1	1–3	1–1	0–1	—	2–1	3–6
Stabæk	1–0	7–1	0–1	3–0	0–1	5–1	0–1	2–1	1–2	0–1	—	0–0
Vålerenga	0–2	7–1	0–3	2–1	2–1	3–2	3–0	1–2	1–1	4–0	3–1	—

Source: Norwegian Football Federation
Legend: Blue = home team win; Yellow = draw; Red = away team win.

== Positions by round ==
Team ╲ Round	1	2	3	4	5	6	7	8	9	10	11	12	13	14	15	16	17	18	19	20	21	22
Brann	1	1	1	1	1	1	1	1	1	1	1	1	1	1	1	1	1	1	1	1	1	1
Aalesund	3	2	7	5	4	3	2	2	2	2	2	2	2	2	2	2	2	2	2	2	2	2
Rosenborg	5	7	3	7	6	5	3	3	3	3	3	3	3	3	3	3	3	3	3	3	3	3
Vålerenga	11	6	2	3	3	2	4	4	4	6	6	4	4	4	4	4	4	4	4	4	4	4
Lyn	4	5	4	2	2	4	5	5	5	5	5	6	7	6	6	6	6	6	5	5	5	5
Stabæk	9	9	5	6	5	6	7	6	6	4	4	5	5	5	5	5	5	5	6	6	6	6
Haugesund	5	10	6	4	7	8	9	9	9	9	9	8	8	9	9	9	8	8	7	7	7	7
Hønefoss	7	4	8	8	10	11	11	11	11	11	11	11	11	11	10	10	10	9	8	8	8	8
Molde	12	12	12	10	9	7	6	8	8	7	7	7	6	7	7	7	7	7	9	9	9	9
Røa	2	2	9	9	8	10	10	10	10	10	10	10	10	10	11	11	11	11	11	10	10	10
LSK Kvinner	10	11	11	12	12	9	8	7	7	8	8	9	9	8	8	8	9	10	10	11	11	11
Bodø/Glimt	7	8	10	11	11	12	12	12	12	12	12	12	12	12	12	12	12	12	12	12	12	12

Qualification for Champions League second qualifying round
Qualification for Europa Cup first qualifying round
Qualification for the relegation play-offs
Relegation to the First Division

== Results by round ==
Team ╲ Round	1	2	3	4	5	6	7	8	9	10	11	12	13	14	15	16	17	18	19	20	21	22
Aalesund	W	D	L	W	W	W	W	W	L	W	W	W	W	W	W	W	D	W	W	W	L	L
Bodø/Glimt	D	D	L	L	L	L	L	L	L	L	L	L	L	D	L	L	W	L	L	L	L	L
Brann	W	D	W	W	W	W	W	W	W	W	W	D	W	W	W	W	W	L	D	W	W	W
Haugesund	D	L	W	W	L	L	L	L	L	W	W	D	D	L	L	L	W	L	W	W	L	W
Hønefoss	D	W	L	L	L	L	L	L	L	D	W	L	L	L	W	D	D	W	W	L	W	D
LSK Kvinner	L	D	L	L	L	W	W	W	W	L	D	L	L	D	L	L	L	L	L	L	L	D
Lyn	W	D	D	W	W	L	D	L	W	D	L	L	L	W	L	W	D	W	W	W	L	W
Molde	L	L	D	W	L	L	W	W	L	L	D	W	D	W	L	L	L	L	L	L	W	L
Rosenborg	D	D	W	L	W	W	W	W	W	L	D	W	W	W	W	W	D	D	D	W	W	W
Røa	W	D	L	L	L	L	D	L	L	D	W	D	L	L	L	D	L	W	L	W	L	L
Stabæk	L	D	W	D	L	W	L	L	W	W	W	L	D	W	W	L	L	W	L	L	W	L
Vålerenga	L	W	W	D	W	W	W	L	W	L	L	L	W	W	W	W	W	D	W	L	W	W

Source: Football Association of Norway (in Norwegian)
W = Win; D = Draw; L = Loss

== Relegation play-offs ==
The 10th-placed team, Røa, are facing Arna-Bjørnar, the winner of the First Division promotion play-off, in a two-legged tie to decide who will play in Toppserien next season.

15 November 2026
13:00 CET

Arna-Bjørnar	7–2	Røa
Skogedal 14', 42'; Garen 22'; Muhić 45'; Andresen 53'; Døskeland 79'; Tilseth 84'	Report	Svastuen 19'; Folland 62'

Arna Idrettspark, Bergen
Attendance: 468
Referee: Maliha Ahmady
22 November 2026
13:00 CET

Røa	v	Arna-Bjørnar
	Report

Røa Kunstgress, Oslo

== Season statistics ==
=== Top scorers ===
Rank	Player	Club	Goals
1	(Norway) Katarina Dybvik Sunde	Aalesund	28
2	(United States) Brenna Lovera	Brann	18
3	(Norway) Ronja Arnesen	Vålerenga	12
4	(Norway) Cille Nilsen	Rosenborg	11
4	(Norway) Joshualyn Reeves	Rosenborg	11
6	(Norway) Kristina Svandal	Haugesund	9
7	(Norway) Anna Malmin	Stabæk	8
7	(Norway) Marie Moen Preus	Vålerenga	8
9	(Norway) Anna Aahjem	Brann	7
9	(Scotland) Lauren Davidson	Brann	7
9	(Norway) Karoline Haugland	Brann	7
9	(Norway) Rebecka Holum	Rosenborg	7
9	(South Korea) Jeon Yu-gyeong	Molde	7

=== Clean sheets ===
Rank	Player	Club	Clean sheets
1	(Norway) Sunniva Skoglund	Brann	10
2	(Norway) Selma Panengstuen	Brann	9
3	(Norway) Thiril Erichsen	Aalesund	7
4	(Norway) Rugile Rulyte	Rosenborg	6
5	(Norway) Kirvil Odden	Lyn	5
6	(Norway) Erla Braathen	Hønefoss	4
7	(Iceland) Fanney Birkisdóttir	Vålerenga	3
7	(United States) Kenna Caldwell	Molde	3
7	(Norway) Tove Enblom	Vålerenga	3
7	(Norway) Siri Ervik	Hønefoss	3
7	(Norway) Una Langkås	Røa	3

=== Hat-tricks ===
Player	For	Against	Result	Date
(Norway) Joshualyn Reeves^{4}	Lyn	Bodø/Glimt	9–0 (H)	25 April 2026
(Iceland) Diljá Zomers	Brann	Hønefoss	6–0 (H)	3 May 2026
(Norway) Katarina Dybvik Sunde^{7}	Aalesund	Bodø/Glimt	8–1 (H)	20 June 2026
(United States) Brenna Lovera	Brann	Røa	5–1 (H)	21 August 2026
(Norway) Katarina Dybvik Sunde	Aalesund	Haugesund	5–1 (H)	22 August 2026
(Norway) Anna Malmin	Stabæk	LSK Kvinner	5–1 (H)	13 September 2026
(Norway) Joshualyn Reeves	Rosenborg	Røa	6–0 (H)	1 November 2026

Notes

^{4} Player scored 4 goals
^{7} Player scored 7 goals
(H) – Home team
(A) – Away team

=== Discipline ===
==== Player ====
- Most yellow cards: 5
  - (Finland) Jasmin Mansaray (LSK Kvinner)
  - (Norway) Nora Nøss (Stabæk)
- Most red cards: 2
  - (Norway) Vilde Aasprang (Lyn)

==== Club ====
- Most yellow cards: 28
  - Stabæk
- Fewest yellow cards: 13
  - Brann
- Most red cards: 2
  - Lyn
  - Røa
- Fewest red cards: 0
  - 8 teams

== Awards ==
Award	Winner	Club
Coach of the Year	(Norway) Martin Lindmark	Aalesund
Player of the Year	(Norway) Katarina Dybvik Sunde	Aalesund
Young Player of the Year	(Norway) Ronja Arnesen	Vålerenga

== League attendances ==
Pos	Team	Total	High	Low	Average	Change
1	Brann	26,642	4,816	1,289	2,422	−21.9%
2	Aalesund	10,674	2,414	561	970	+51.3%^{1}
3	Haugesund	10,150	1,395	737	923	+55.9%^{1}
4	Rosenborg	9,357	1,876	351	851	+12.4%
5	Molde	7,997	1,202	552	727	+44.0%^{1}
6	Hønefoss	7,236	927	586	658	−6.3%
7	Stabæk	6,589	2,865	255	599	+40.0%
8	Vålerenga	6,017	1,336	215	547	−12.9%
9	LSK Kvinner	5,593	1,282	224	508	+3.0%
10	Bodø/Glimt	5,463	880	375	497	+0.4%
11	Røa	3,391	406	209	308	+9.2%
12	Lyn	2,923	490	219	292	+45.3%
	League total	102,032	4,515	209	779	+6.4%

Source: NIFS
Notes:
^{1} Team played last season in the First Division.
