= Norwegian Third Division =

Norsk Tipping-ligaen
- Founded: 1963; 63 years ago 1963–1990 (as 4. divisjon); 1991–2016 (as 3. divisjon); 2017–present (as Norsk Tipping-ligaen)
- Country: Norway
- Confederation: UEFA
- Number of clubs: 84 (in six groups of 14)
- Level on pyramid: 4
- Promotion to: Norwegian Second Division
- Relegation to: Norwegian Fourth Division
- Domestic cup: Norwegian Cup
- Current champions: Group 1: Asker; Group 2: Volda; Group 3: Os; Group 4: Madla; Group 5: Fløya; Group 6: Lillehammer (2026)
- Broadcaster: Direktesport
- Website: norskligafotball.no
- Current: 2026 Norwegian Third Division

The Norwegian Third Division, also called 3. divisjon and Norsk Tipping-ligaen, is the fourth-highest division of the men's football league in Norway. Like the rest of the Norwegian football league system, the season runs from spring to autumn, approximately April to October. After the 2010 season, the league was reorganised, reducing the number of teams to 164 and halving the number of parallel sections from 24 to 12. After the 2016 season, the league was again reorganised, reducing the number of teams from 164 to 84 and halving the number of groups from twelve to six.

All six group winners are promoted to the Second Division, while the bottom three in all groups are relegated to the Fourth Division.

== History ==
=== 1963–2010 ===
The 3. divisjon was known as the 4. divisjon from 1963 until 1990, when the top-tier league changed its name to Tippeligaen, the 2. divisjon became the 1. divisjon and the names of all the lower divisions were adjusted accordingly. Until 2010, there were 24 parallel sections of the 3. divisjon, each consisting of between 10 and 16 teams. The winners paired up and played each other in one home match and one away match in a playoff. Thus, 12 teams were promoted to the 2. divisjon. This system was in place from 2001. The number of teams that were relegated from each section to the 4. divisjon, varied from two to four, depending on the number of teams in each section.

=== 2011–2016 ===
From 2011 to 2016, 3. divisjon consisted of 12 parallel sections of 12 or 14 teams, and the winners of each group was promoted to the 2. divisjon. Ten sections consisted of 14 teams each, from the South of Norway, the last two sections consisted of 12 teams each, from the Northern Norway. In the sections with 14 teams, the bottom three teams were relegated to the 4. divisjon, and in the two sections with 12 teams each, the bottom two teams were relegated.

=== 2017– ===
After changes in the Norwegian football pyramid, no teams were promoted from the 3. divisjon after the 2016 season. The fourth tier was split into six groups which for the 2017 season consisted of the teams finishing from 7th to 14th in the 2016 2. divisjon groups and the top 4 teams from the 3. divisjon groups along with the 8 best 5th-placed teams in the 3. divisjon. The rest of the teams in the 2016 3. divisjon was relegated. As of the 2018 season, the 3. divisjon consist of 6 groups of 14 teams.

Like in the rest of the Norwegian Football league system, all the teams play each other twice, once at home and once away. Three points are awarded for a win, one for a draw, and if two teams are equal on points, the one with the best goal difference is above the other on the table. The teams are placed in the 6 sections according to geographic considerations. Travel times have also been considered occasionally; Bjørnevatn IL in the outskirts of Kirkenes was placed in a group dedicated to the greater Oslo area in the 2017 and 2018 seasons, as commuting by plane between Kirkenes Airport and Gardermoen Airport was deemed easier than travelling westwards through northern Norway by road.

== Current members ==
The following 84 clubs are competing in the 2026 Norwegian Third Division.

Group 1

- Asker
- Bærum
- Frigg
- Gamle Oslo
- Grei
- Heming
- KFUM 2
- Konnerud
- Lokomotiv Oslo
- Nordstrand
- Ready
- Ullern
- Union Carl Berner
- Vålerenga 2

Group 2

- Aalesund 2
- Byåsen
- Herd
- Kvik
- Melhus
- Molde 2
- Nardo
- NTNUI
- Orkla
- Ranheim 2
- Rosenborg 2
- Spjelkavik
- Strindheim
- Volda

Group 3

- Åsane 2
- Askøy
- Austevoll
- Brann 2
- Djerv 1919
- Fana
- Førde
- Fyllingsdalen
- Gneist
- Os
- Sogndal 2
- Stord
- Vard Haugesund
- Varegg

Group 4

- Åkra
- Brodd
- Fløy
- Haugesund 2
- Hinna
- Madla
- Mandalskameratene
- Odd 2
- Staal Jørpeland
- Stabæk 2
- Våg
- Varhaug
- Viking 2
- Vinbjart

Group 5

- Alta
- Bossekop
- Fauske/Sprint
- Finnsnes
- Fløya
- Harstad
- Kongsvinger 2
- Lillestrøm 2
- Skedsmo
- Skjervøy
- Skjetten
- Strømsgodset 2
- Tromsø 2
- Ulfstind

Group 6

- Bjørkelangen
- Brumunddal
- Drøbak-Frogn
- Elverum
- Fram
- Gjøvik-Lyn
- Lillehammer
- Lyn 2
- Oppsal
- Ørn Horten
- Råde
- Rælingen
- Sandefjord 2
- Sarpsborg 08 2

== Reserve teams ==
Reserve teams of clubs from the two top divisions can participate in the 3. divisjon. Reserve teams of clubs from the 1. divisjon can not play in the 2. divisjon, and can therefore not be promoted from the 3. divisjon.

== Sponsorship ==
From 2017, 3. divisjon has its title sponsorship rights sold to Norsk Tipping.

Period	Sponsor	Name
1963–1990	No sponsor	4. divisjon
1991–2016	No sponsor	3. divisjon
2017–	Norsk Tipping	Norsk Tipping-ligaen

== Winners ==
=== 2011–2016 ===
Season	Group 1	Group 2	Group 3	Group 4	Group 5	Group 6	Group 7	Group 8	Group 9	Group 10	Group 11	Group 12
2011	Østsiden	Gjøvik	Grorud	Birkebeineren	Jerv	Start 2^{1}	Brann 2	Fana	Træff	Buvik	Mo	Finnsnes
2012	Drøbak/Frogn	Skedsmo	Lyn	Eidsvold Turn	Arendal	Viking 2	Arna-Bjørnar	Førde	Skarbøvik	Strindheim	Bodø/Glimt 2	Bossekop
2013	Skeid	Stabæk 2	Brumunddal	Holmen	Ørn-Horten	Jerv	Stord	Florø	Herd	Tiller	Medkila	Finnsnes
2014	Sprint-Jeløy	Ullern	Lillestrøm 2	Drammen	Donn	Sola	Odda	Aalesund 2	Strindheim	Stjørdals-Blink	Mjølner	Senja
2015	Oppsal	Asker	Frigg	Tønsberg	Pors	Stord	Lysekloster	Brattvåg	Tynset	Rosenborg 2	Mo	Tromsø 2
2016	Kråkerøy	Lyn	Skedsmo	Vestfossen	Viking 2	Staal	Brann 2	Herd	Eidsvold Turn	Kolstad	Sortland	Fløya

- ^{1} Start 2 were not eligible for promotion, runners-up Egersund promoted.

=== 2017– ===
Season	Group 1	Group 2	Group 3	Group 4	Group 5	Group 6
2017	Moss	Stabæk 2	Fløy	Brattvåg	Stjørdals-Blink	Mjølner
2018	Oppsal	Kvik Halden	Sola	Sotra	Byåsen	Senja
2019	Eidsvold Turn	Vålerenga 2	Fløy	Vard Haugesund	Rosenborg 2	Fløya
2021	Gjøvik-Lyn	Ørn Horten	Staal Jørpeland	Frigg	Træff	Ullern
2022	Lyn	Aalesund 2	Brann 2	Fram Larvik	Junkeren	Strømsgodset 2
2023	Lysekloster	Eidsvold Turn	Viking 2	Eik Tønsberg	Strindheim	Follo
2024	Sandviken	Pors	Asker	Rana	Træff	Hønefoss
2025	Junkeren	Trygg/Lade	Lørenskog	Bjarg	Vidar	Kvik Halden
2026	Asker	Volda	Os	Madla	Fløya	Lillehammer
