= Molde FK (women) =

Norwegian football team

Molde
- Full name: Molde Fotballklubb
- Nicknames: MFK-damene ("The MFK Ladies")
- Short name: MFK
- Founded: 19 June 1911; 115 years ago
- Ground: Aker Stadion; Reknesbanen^{2}
- Capacity: 11,249; 1,500^{2}
- Chairman: Odd Ivar Moen
- Head coach: Kent Rudning
- League: Toppserien
- 2026: Toppserien, 9th of 12
- Website: http://www.moldefk.no/
Home colours	Away colours	Third colours

Molde Fotballklubb (pronounced [ˈmɔ̂ɫdə]) is a Norwegian women's football team based in Molde that currently plays in Toppserien, the Norwegian top flight. Founded on 19 June 1911, Molde was originally known as International. Their first appearance in the highest tier of Norwegian women's football was during the 1994 season. Molde FK Women did not compete in 2003 and 2008 due to a lack of players.

Molde won the 3. divisjon (Sunnmøre) in 2014 and were promoted to the 2015 2. divisjon. Former Molde player Morten Kristiansen was head coach during the 2018 and 2019 seasons. The club was promoted to the 1. divisjon in 2024 and to Toppserien in 2025.

Since the 2025 season, the current head coach is Kent Rudning.

== Stadium ==
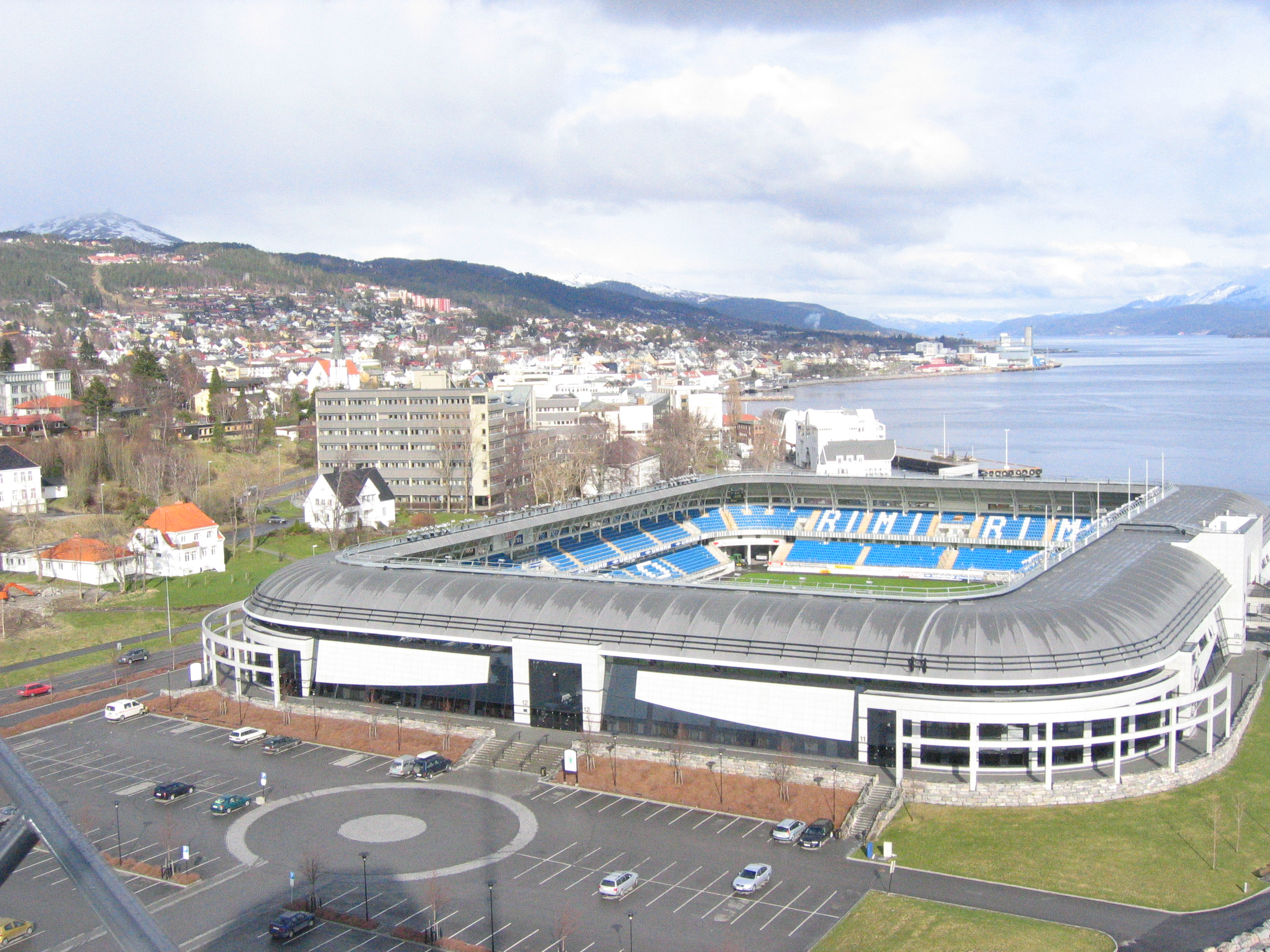
Aker Stadion

Currently, Molde play their home matches at Aker Stadion or Reknesbanen. Molde's main stadium is the Aker Stadion, formerly known as Molde Stadion, located at Reknes, by the seashore of central Molde. The 212 million kr cost was mostly paid for by investor Kjell Inge Røkke, after whom the ground has been nicknamed "Røkkeløkka". The official name of the new stadium was Molde Stadion until 3 May 2006, when the stadium name changed to Aker Stadion following a sponsorship deal with Røkke's company Aker. The stadium was inaugurated on 18 April 1998, when the stadium was officially opened by Prime Minister and Molde fan Kjell Magne Bondevik. Molde FK Women did not play at Aker Stadion until 2014, when the turf was changed from natural grass to an artificial turf. Their first game on Aker Stadion was the 5−0 win against Brattvåg on 30 April 2014.

At dates when Aker Stadion is unavailable, Molde play their home matches at Reknesbanen, located 750 metres north of Aker Stadion, which is the home arena of Træff

== Players ==
=== Current squad ===
As of 18 July 2025

Note: Flags indicate national team as defined under FIFA eligibility rules; some limited exceptions apply. Players may hold more than one non-FIFA nationality.

No.	Pos.	Nation	Player
1	GK	USA	Kenna Caldwell
3	DF	NOR	Marie Johansdottir
4	DF	NOR	Tora Ose
6	MF	NOR	Helena Nygård
7	MF	NOR	Sanna Andersen Mahle
8	FW	DEN	Laura Guldbjerg Pedersen
9	FW	KOR	Jeon Yu-gyeong
10	MF	NOR	Ida Emilie Heggem Warvik
11	MF	SUI	Chiara Messerli
13	MF	GHA	Evelyn Badu
15	DF	NOR	Emma Sæther

No.	Pos.	Nation	Player
17	DF	NOR	Hilde Bjåstad
18	MF	NOR	Emilia Zlotnicka
19	MF	FIN	Silja Tuominen
20	DF	NOR	Mia Settemsdal
22	GK	NOR	Terese Melsæther
23	MF	NOR	Andrine Outzen
25	MF	NOR	Sara Hammer Svendsen
30	MF	NOR	Mia Nygård
32	DF	NOR	Mari Hoås
34	GK	NOR	Ida G. Elshaug
77	MF	NOR	Mille Aune

== Club officials ==
=== Club directors ===
Role	Name
Chairman	Odd Ivar Moen
Managing Director	Øystein Neerland
Finance Manager	Ole Jakob Strandhagen
Marketing Director	Oddvar Talset
Leader Women's Football	Erlend Holmlund

=== Coaching staff ===
Role	Name
Head Coach	(Norway) Kent Rudning
Playing Assistant Coach	(Sweden) Ebba Wieder
First Team Coach	(Norway) Kjell Arne Hestad
First Team Goalkeeping Coach	(Norway) William Fraser
Analyst/Internship	(Norway) Christian Skui Stenseth
Physiotherapist	(Norway) Elin Kortner Lystad
Physical Coach	(Norway) Georgios Pantelidis
First Team Leader	(Norway) Tor Melsæther

== Recent history ==
As of match played December 1, 2023

Level	Season	League										Cup	Europe	Top goalscorer (league)	
Level	Season	Division	Pos	G	W	D	L	GS	GA	Pts	Att	Cup	Europe	Name	Goals
4	2010	3. divisjon, Nordmøre og Romsdal	2	12	7	1	4	30	17	22	—	dnq		—N/a	—N/a
4	2011	3. divisjon, Nordmøre og Romsdal	3	10	6	3	1	36	14	21	—	dnq		—N/a	—N/a
4	2012	3. divisjon, Nordmøre og Romsdal	4	12	5	4	3	45	16	29	—	dnq		—N/a	—N/a
4	2013	3. divisjon, Nordmøre og Romsdal	1	12	12	0	0	79	6	36	—	dnq		Hanna Tveit Lyche	10
4	2014	3. divisjon, Sunnmøre	1 ↑	18	17	0	1	127	9	51	—	dnq		Hanna Tveit Lyche	33
3	2015	2. divisjon, group 6	4	18	10	1	7	32	26	31	—	dnq		Hanna Tveit Lyche	10
3	2016	2. divisjon, group 6	4	18	10	3	5	34	18	33	—	Third round		Julie Belden Rasmussen	7
3	2017	2. divisjon, group 6	2	18	14	2	2	67	20	44	—	Second round		Julie Belden Rasmussen	25
3	2018	2. divisjon, group 6	3	18	12	3	3	61	22	39	—	Second round		Julie Vik	12
3	2019	2. divisjon, group 6	4	16	10	2	4	46	19	32	—	First round		Live Aak	12
3	2020	2. divisjon, group 5	Season cancelled as a result of the COVID-19 pandemic									dnq			
3	2021	2. divisjon, group 5	2	9	8	0	1	50	10	24	—	Second round		Nora Håheim	16
3	2022	2. divisjon, group 5	2	18	13	4	1	65	16	43	—	Second round		Eivor Ulvund	12
3	2023	2. divisjon, group 1	2	26	19	3	4	75	29	60	—	Second round		Eivor Ulvund	24
3	2024	2. divisjon, group 3													

== Coaches ==
- Per Lianes (2002)
- Birgitta Sekkeseter (2004)
- Roald Blakseth (2005)
- Unknown (2006–2011)
- Jørund Svensli (2012–2017)
- Morten Kristiansen (2018–2019)
- August Nyland (2020–2023)
- Jack Majgaard Jensen (2024)
- Kent Rudning (2025-)

== History of league positions ==
	1993	1994	1995–2000	2001–2002	2003	2004–2007	2008	2009–2014	2015–
Toppserien (level 1)					did not compete		did not compete		
1. divisjon (level 2)					did not compete		did not compete		
2. divisjon (level 3)					did not compete		did not compete		
3. divisjon (level 4)					did not compete		did not compete		
