= FK Haugesund (women) =

Norwegian women's football club

Fotballklubben Haugesund
- Full name: Fotballklubben Haugesund
- Nickname: Maakene (The Seagulls)
- Founded: 28 October 1993; 33 years ago
- Ground: Haugesund Stadion; City of Haugesund, Rogaland
- Capacity: 8,754
- Head coach: Ole-Petter Pedersen Bremstein
- League: Toppserien
- 2026: Toppserien, 7th of 12
- Website: www.fkh.no
Home colours	Away colours

Fotballklubben Haugesund Kvinner (lit. 'Football Club Haugesund'), usually referred to as FK Haugesund or FKH, is a Norwegian women's football team based in Haugesund that plays in Norway's top league, Toppserien.

== History ==
Founded in 1993, FK Haugesund established a women's team for the first time in 2021. FKH played their first official women's match in the 2. divisjon on 20 April 2022, winning 5–0 at home against Stord.

=== Merger with Avaldsnes IL ===
In January 2024, FK Haugesund merged with Avaldsnes IL, a club playing in the 1. divisjon, with the agreement that FK Haugesund will fully takeover Avaldsnes in the 2025 season.

Due to Norwegian Football Federation (NFF) regulations, FKH continued playing under the Avaldsnes name and logo during the 2024 season while wearing FK Haugesund kit. Although in practice, the team operated as FK Haugesund while awaiting formal approval from the NFF. The squad included coaches and players from both clubs and FK Haugesund also maintained a separate team in the 2. divisjon, resulting in the club fielding two teams simultaneously in different divisions. This situation occurred due to NFF licensing deadlines, which typically close in October of the previous year.

On 18 September 2024, the NFF officially approved the takeover, allowing FK Haugesund to compete under its own name from the 2025 season onward.

== Stadium ==
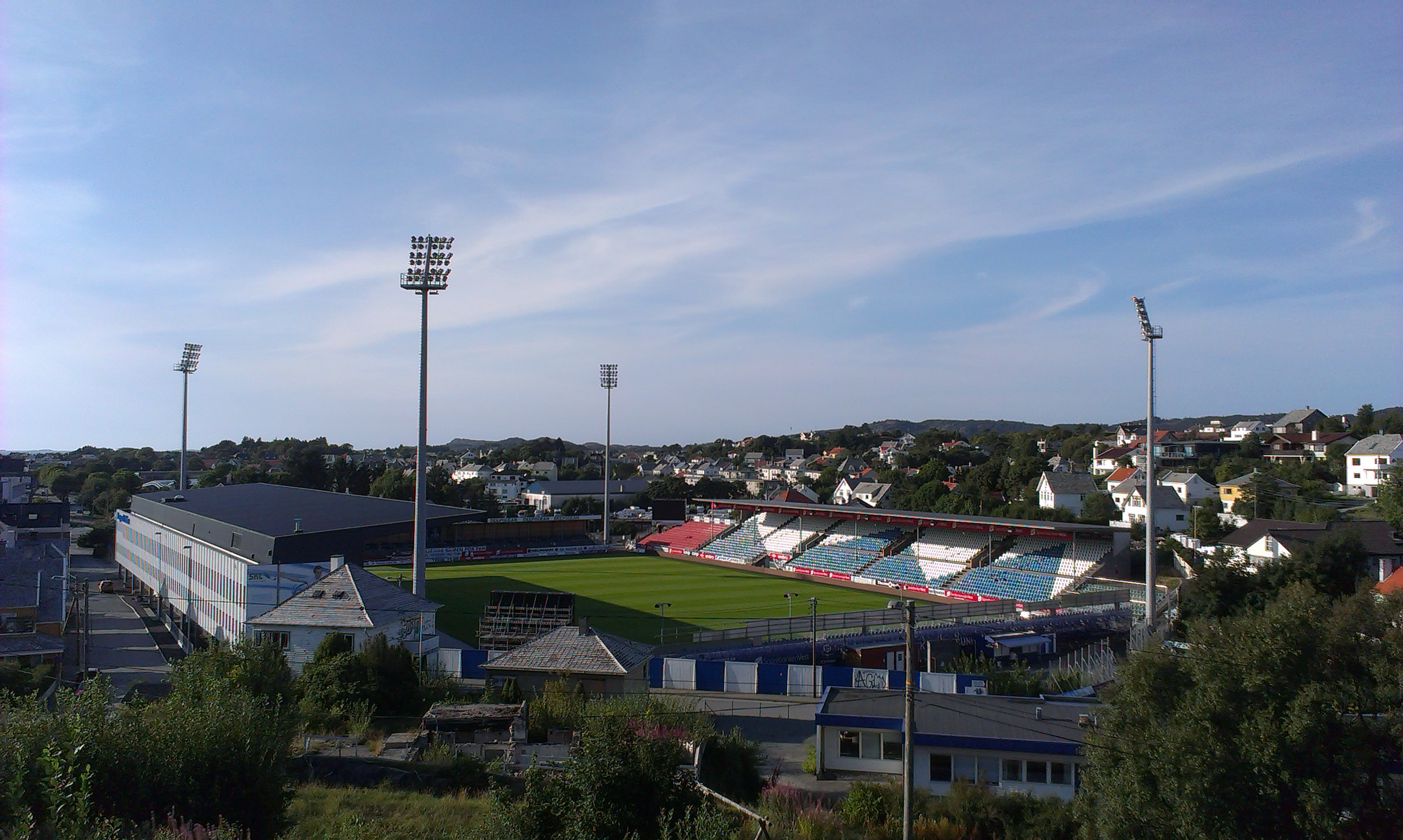
Haugesund Stadion

Currently, FK Haugesund plays their home matches at Haugesund Stadion, also known as Haugesund Sparebank Arena. The stadium has an official capacity of 8,754 and is colloquially referred to as "Gamlå" (the Old One). FK Haugesund women's first game on Haugesund Sparebank Arena was the 2–1 win against Avaldsnes 2 on 16 October 2022.

== Players ==
=== Current squad ===
As of 2 February 2026

Note: Flags indicate national team as defined under FIFA eligibility rules; some limited exceptions apply. Players may hold more than one non-FIFA nationality.

No.	Pos.	Nation	Player
2	MF	USA	Leyah Hall-Robinson
4	DF	NOR	Kaja Olsen
5	DF	NOR	Sunniva Hjertvik
6	MF	NOR	Kristine Nybru (captain)
7	MF	PHI	Meryll Abrahamsen
9	FW	NOR	Kristina Svandal
10	FW	NOR	Solfrid Hetleflåt Bråthen
11	MF	FIN	Daniela Tolonen
12	GK	NOR	Anniken Solstrand

No.	Pos.	Nation	Player
13	DF	NOR	Libe Haftorsen-Brakstad
14	MF	NOR	Sandra Østenstad
17	FW	NOR	Emilie Guddal
18	MF	NOR	Selma Nesheim
22	DF	NOR	Eline Njøsen
23	MF	NOR	Mia Farestad
24	GK	NOR	Frida Kvale Aursland
44	FW	NOR	Cecilie Mjelde
—	DF	USA	Lauren Bruno
—	DF	NOR	Hanna Dahl
—	DF	FIN	Linda Nyman

== Staff ==
Coaching staff
Position	Name
Head coach	(Norway) Ole-Petter Pedersen Bremstein
Assistant coach	(Norway) Johannes Kvammen Kallevik
Assistant coach	(Norway) Martin Sverdrupsen
Sports director	(Norway) Rune Lothe
Goalkeeper coach	(Norway) Espen Skistad
Player developer	(Norway) Per Øyvind Mortveit
Development manager	(Norway) Monica Arnesen
Physiotherapist	(Wales) Aaron Fulton-Brown
Physiotherapist	(Norway) Sigurd Kongsrud Aasmundstad
Team leader	(Norway) Ståle Abrahamsen
Physical trainer	(Norway) Harald Andreassen

== Former and present managers ==
- (Norway) Thomas Dahle (4 November 2021 – 24 August 2024)
- (Norway) Per Øyvind Mortveit (interim) (27 August 2024 – 31 December 2024)
- (Norway) Ole-Petter Pedersen Bremstein (7 September 2024 – )

== Recent seasons ==
Season		Pos.	Pl.	W	D	L	GS	GA	P	Cup	Notes
2024	1. divisjon	8	18	5	3	10	18	32	18	2nd round	
2025	1. divisjon	↑ 2	22	14	4	4	53	26	46	1st round	Promoted to Toppserien
2026	Toppserien	7	22	8	3	11	30	46	27	2nd round	
