= Lura IL =

Norwegian sports club

- Full name: Lura Idrettslag
- Founded: 1963
- Ground: Lura stadion Lura
- League: Third Division
Home colours

Lura Idrettslag is a Norwegian sports club from Sandnes. It has sections for association football, team handball, basketball, floorball and American football.

The club was founded in 1963 and entered the Football Association of Norway in 1965. In addition to the current sports in the club, Lura IL has practiced table tennis and cheerleading.

The men's football team currently plays in the Third Division, the fourth tier of Norwegian football. The team was newly promoted for 2016, and in recent times they only had one other season at this level, in 1999. Youth players from Lura IL who later turned professional include Trond Erik Bertelsen and Zymer Bytyqi.

Their American football team Lura Bulls became Norwegian league champion in 2015.
