= Halsøy IL =

Norwegian sports club

Home colours

Halsøy IL is a Norwegian sports club in Halsøy, Mosjøen, Norway. It has sections for association football and Nordic skiing.

The club was founded in 1920.

The men's team played in the Third Division, the fourth tier of Norwegian football, in 2007. This was the first time ever, and the club was relegated after one season.
