= SK Herd =

Norwegian sports club

Herd
- Full name: Sportsklubben Herd
- Founded: 20 August 1932; 93 years ago
- League: 4. divisjon
- 2022: 4. divisjon (Sunnmøre), 1st
Home colours	Away colours

Sportsklubben Herd is a sports club from Ålesund, Norway. It has sections for association football, handball and swimming, and was founded on 22 August 1932. The men's football team plays in the Fourth Division (fifth tier) having been relegated from Third Division in 2019.

== History ==
Herd was promoted from the Fourth to the Third Division following the 2008 season. Ahead of the 2009 season they signed Lasse Olsen and Karl Oskar Fjørtoft for both playing and non-playing capacities. In 2010 it contested a playoff to win promotion, and succeeded by beating Sunndal 8–2 on aggregate. In their first season in Second Division, they finished last with 17 points in 24 matches and was relegated.

== Recent history ==
Season		Pos.	Pl.	W	D	L	GS	GA	P	Cup	Notes
2010	3. divisjon	↑ 1	22	19	0	3	92	22	57	First qualifying round	Promoted to the 2. divisjon
2011	2. divisjon	↓ 13	24	4	5	15	32	66	17	First round	Relegated to the 3. divisjon
2012	3. divisjon	4	26	15	2	9	76	39	47	First round	
2013	3. divisjon	↑ 1	26	21	2	3	86	30	65	First round	Promoted to the 2. divisjon
2014	2. divisjon	↓ 12	26	6	4	16	28	56	22	First round	Relegated to the 3. divisjon
2015	3. divisjon	3	26	14	4	8	67	42	46	First round	
2016	3. divisjon	1	26	17	5	4	69	28	56	Second round	
2017	3. divisjon	3	26	12	6	8	57	48	42	First round	
2018	3. divisjon	7	26	10	4	12	46	48	34	First round	
2019	3. divisjon	↓ 12	26	7	7	12	34	46	28	First round	Relegated to the 4. divisjon
2020	Season cancelled										
2021	4. divisjon	2	11	8	3	0	32	6	27	First round	
2022	4. divisjon	1	22	18	2	2	59	19	56	First round	Lost playoffs for promotion
