= Sortland IL =

Norwegian football club

- Full name: Sortland Idrettslag
- Founded: 3 March 1901
- Ground: Blåbyhallen, Sortland
- League: Third Division
- 2026: 1st, 4.Div. (promoted)

Sortland Idrettslag is a Norwegian association football club from Sortland, Vesterålen. It was formerly a multi-sports club.

== History ==
The club was founded on 3 March 1901 as SK Fremskridt, practising Nordic skiing. Later, athletics and gymnastics were added and the club name changed to Sortland TIL, later IL Fram and in 1929 Sortland IL. In 1936, Sortland IL absorbed a small football club Varg, meaning that football and swimming were introduced in Sortland IL. After World War II, the club also had sections for speed skating, alpine skiing, orienteering, volleyball and handball. Sortland IL ceased being a multi-sports club in 1988–1989, when the various sections broke out and formed independent clubs, such as Sortland FIK for athletics.

The club colours are black and white.

== Football history ==
The men's football team plays in the Third Division, the fourth tier of Norwegian football. During the 1990s, the club spent several years on the third tier. Being relegated in 1997, the team managed instant re-promotion from the 1998 Third Division to the 1999 Second Division.

As the 1999 season came to a conclusion, the members' convention of Sortland IL voted to merge the men's team with IL Morild and take the name FK Vesterålen. The new club never gained traction throughout the region of Vesterålen, and would revert to Sortland IL after the 2004 season.

The women's football team last played in the Second Division in 2022.

== Domestic Record ==
Season	Division	Pos	Pld	W	D	L	Pts	Norwegian Cup	Note
2017	3. divisjon	3	26	14	3	9	45	Second round	
2018	3. divisjon	↓ 14	26	3	4	19	13	First round	Relegated to the 4. divisjon
2019	4. divisjon	7	20	7	4	9	25	Did not qualify	
Season cancelled
2021	4. divisjon	2	8	5	1	2	16	Did not qualify	
2022	4. divisjon	6	18	9	0	9	27	Did not qualify	
2023	4. divisjon	6	18	8	3	7	27	Did not qualify	
2024	4. divisjon	↑ 1	18	17	0	1	51	First round	Promoted to the 3. divisjon
2025	3. divisjon	↓ 13	13	26	5	4	17	Second round	Relegated to the 4. divisjon
2026	4. divisjon	↑ 1	16	12	2	2	38	Did not qualify	Promoted to the 3. divisjon
