= Bossekop UL =

Norwegian sports club

- Full name: Bossekop Ungdomslag
- Founded: 25 July 1912; 113 years ago
- Ground: Coop Arena Kunstgress, Bossekop
- League: 2018 4. divisjon / 24
- 2018: 2018 4. divisjon / 24, 8th
Home colours

Bossekop Ungdomslag is a Norwegian sports club from Bossekop in Alta Municipality in Finnmark county. It has sections for association football, team handball, speed skating and Nordic skiing.

It was founded on 25 July 1912 as a youth association. A sports team within Bossekop UL (cf IL i BUL) was founded in 1958. The club practiced athletics from 1960, speed skating from 1961, football from 1967, handball from 1973, skiing since 1980 and biathlon since 1991. Some sections later became defunct.

The men's football team plays in the 2. divisjon, the third tier of Norwegian football, after promotion in 2012. The team also played in the Second Division in 2000, 2003 and 2009. The two latter promotions were achieved through playoffs in 2002 and 2008; the club also lost one playoff (to Lyngen/Karnes IL) in 2004. The club has sent players to the Sápmi football team.

The club has had internationally known speed skaters, including Asle T. Johansen and Jarle Pedersen.

== Recent history ==
Season		Pos.	Pl.	W	D	L	GS	GA	P	Cup	Notes
2000	2. divisjon	↓ 12	22	0	3	19	31	95	3	First qualifying round	Relegated to the 3. divisjon
2001	3. divisjon	3	20	13	2	5	67	24	41	First round	
2002	3. divisjon	↑ 1	22	18	1	3	77	16	55	Second qualifying round	Promoted to the 2. divisjon
2003	2. divisjon	↓ 13	26	8	2	16	33	57	26	First round	Relegated to the 3. divisjon
2004	3. divisjon	1	22	18	1	3	128	23	55	First round	
2005	3. divisjon	2	22	16	4	2	105	26	52	First round	
2006	3. divisjon	5	22	13	2	7	66	42	41	First qualifying round	
2007	3. divisjon	2	22	18	2	2	107	18	56	First round	
2008	3. divisjon	↑ 1	22	21	0	1	103	16	63	First round	Promoted to the 2. divisjon
2009	2. divisjon	↓ 14	26	1	5	20	29	84	8	First round	Relegated to the 3. divisjon
2010	3. divisjon	2	22	15	5	2	81	17	47	First qualifying round	
2011	3. divisjon	4	22	12	2	8	67	41	38	First qualifying round	
2012	3. divisjon	↑ 1	22	19	3	0	77	19	60	First qualifying round	Promoted to the 2. divisjon
2013	2. divisjon	↓ 14	26	4	5	17	28	51	17	First round	Relegated to the 3. divisjon
