= KIL/Hemne =

Norwegian football club

- Full name: KIL/Hemne Fotball
- Founded: 1988
- League: Fourth Division (Men); First Division (Women)
- 2022 (Men) 2022 (Women): Fourth Division / 4th First Division / 4th
- Website: https://kilhemne.no/
Home colours

KIL/Hemne is a football club from Kyrksæterøra in Heim Municipality in Trøndelag county, Norway. Top-level players Erik Hoftun, Ardian Gashi, Alex Valencia, Vegard Forren, Pål André Helland and Magnus Stamnestrø began their careers here. As of 2023, the Men's team play in the Fourth Division while the Women's team play in the First Division.

== History ==
KIL/Hemne were formed in 1988 and were promoted to the 2nd Division in the same year. The club played the next four seasons in the Third Division. They stayed there until 2001, when they were relegated. They went back up to the Third Division in 2003 and the Second Division in 2005. In 2006 they again went down to the 3rd division after a season that was full of long-term injuries to almost all key players. On 20 October 2007 KIL/Hemne were again promoted to the Second Division after beating Verdal over two playoff games. They were relegated again right away the following season. They played in the third division until 2016 when they got relegated after a change in the league structure, resulting in 108 of 164 teams in the third division being relegated to the fourth division. They have been in the fourth division since 2017.

=== 2007 Cup run ===
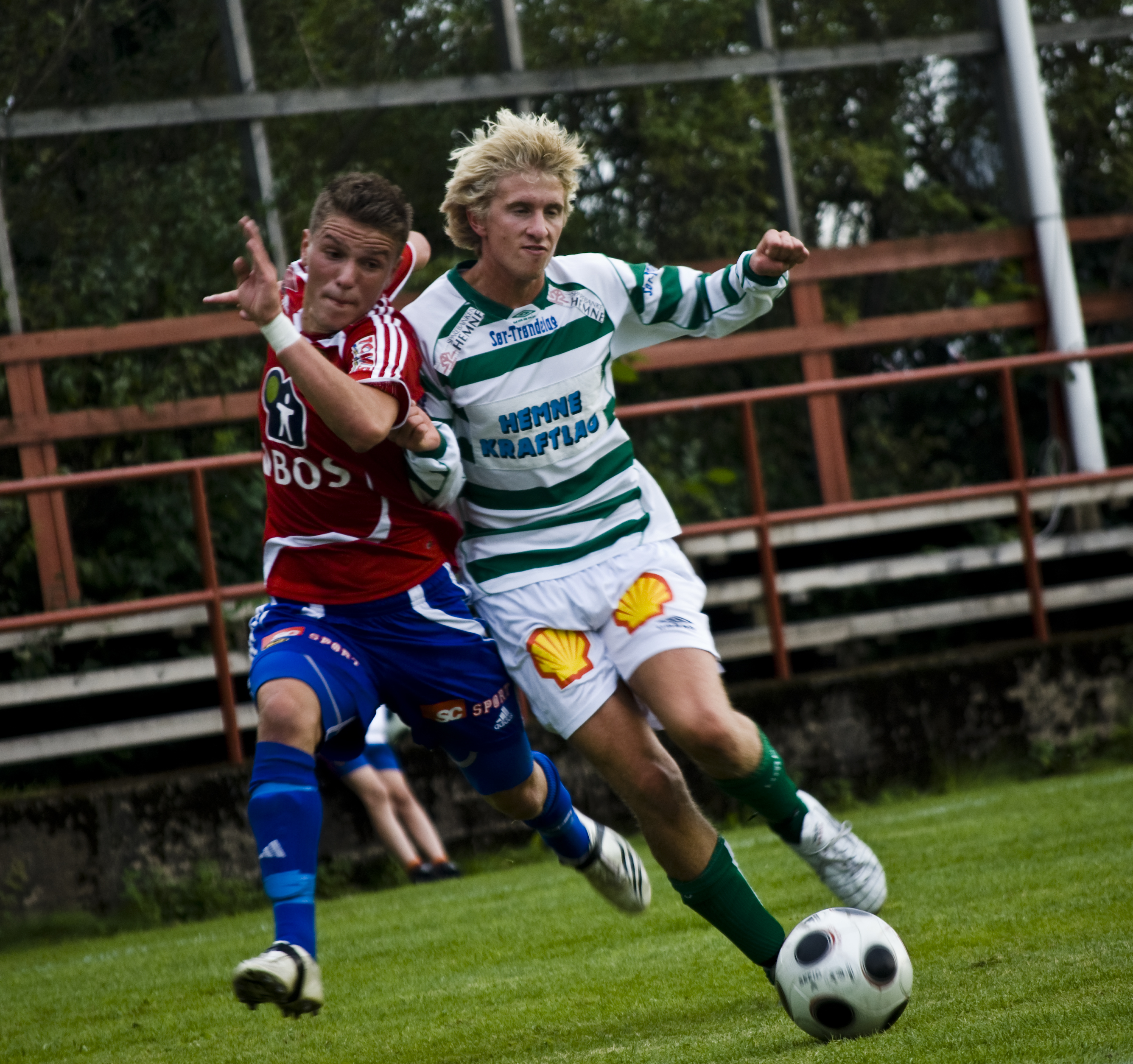
Skeid Fotball - KIL/Hemne Fotball 7–3, Norwegian second division (level 3) group 2, 17 August 2008. Flamur Kastrati, Skeid (left); unknown player, KIL/Hemne (right)

In the 2007 Norwegian Football Cup KIL/Hemne caused one of the biggest shocks when they beat Molde 3–1 at home in the cup first round. The same team had previously beaten KIL/Hemne 11-1 a year earlier.

In the second round, the team were up against Rosenborg. RBK took a 16th-minute lead through Didier Konan Ya. However, just two minutes later, former Rosenborg player Ole Johan Singsdal made it 1-1. KIL/Hemne continued to press and went into the break level. Just after half-time KIL/Hemne shocked Norwegian football by taking a 2–1 lead after Asgeir Snekvik scored in the 46th minute. However, RBK scored 8 minutes later through Roar Strand. In the 83rd minute KIL/Hemne again shocked Norway when Espen Sødahl made it 3–2. However, the goal was disallowed because KIL/Hemne's Ole Johan Singsdal pushed Per Ciljan Skjelbred in the chest. After full-time it stood at 2-and went to extra time. Only five minutes into the first half of extra time, RBK took the lead through Alexander Tettey and most people thought that the game was over. However, after 116 minutes, Asgeir Snekvik scored to make it 3-3 and take it to penalties. One minute later, with one minute remaining of stoppage time, RBK had a free kick in a good position and Didier Konan Ya swung it around the wall and up into the top corner. The drama didn't stop there. In the last second, KIL/Hemne had a corner and sent all of their players up in the home of making it 4-4 and keeping it to penalties. The ball came in from the right, and Morten Klungervik headed the ball against the crossbar and out. The match ended 4–3 to Rosenborg.
