= FK Fyllingsdalen =

Norwegian sports club

Fyllingsdalen
- Full name: FK Fyllingsdalen
- Short name: FYL
- Founded: 20 September 2011; 15 years ago
- Ground: Varden Amfi; Bergen
- Capacity: 3,500
- Chairman: Trond Leganger
- League: Third Division
- 2024: Third Division group 6, 9th of 14
Home colours	Away colours

FK Fyllingsdalen is a football club from Fyllingsdalen, a borough in the Norwegian city of Bergen. The club is a result of a merge between the two football clubs Fyllingen and Løv-Ham.

In 2011, the last season before the merge, Løv-Ham played in 1. divisjon but was relegated, while Fyllingen played in the 3. divisjon. Fyllingsdalen took over Løv-Ham's spot in the 2012 2. divisjon.

== History ==
=== Fyllingen Fotball ===
Fyllingen Fotball was founded on 6 June 1946, and had its heyday in the 1990s. In 1990, Fyllingen won silver in the Norwegian Cup, after losing the final against Rosenborg with 5–1. They played in the top league of Norway in 1990, 1991 and 1993. At the time of the merge, Fyllingen was playing in the Third Division, after being relegated from the Second Division in 2009. Two of Fyllingen's former players, Per-Ove Ludvigsen and Erik Huseklepp, have earned caps playing for Norway.

=== Løv-Ham Fotball ===
Løv-Ham Fotball was founded in December 1975 and was promoted to Adeccoligaen in 2004. After several years in the relegation zone, Løv-Ham achieved a fourth place in 2010 and qualified for the promotion playoff, where they lost 2–0 against Fredrikstad. At the time of the merge, Løv-Ham had been relegated to the Second Division.

== Merge ==
Løv-Ham has in recent years taken over Fyllingen's spot as Fyllingsdalen's best football club, but it was still Fyllingen that received the biggest support and the financial power in the borough. In the end of 2007, the two clubs started negotiations to merge the football departments of the two clubs. The goal was a budget of at least 16 million, 60% more than Løv-Ham's budget in 2007. The aim was to create an organization and a name that create a stable state football team, and which in time also would be able to play up in Tippeligaen. The experiment was stranded when it could not achieve a sufficient majority at the extraordinary annual meeting of Fyllingen.

Four years later, on 28 September 2011, the members of both clubs voted to merge. They replaced Løv-Ham in the 2012 Norwegian Second Division, and the two old clubs will cease to exist. Kjetil Knutsen became the head coach of the new team.

=== Name conflict ===
After the decision to merge the two clubs, there was a conflict regarding the new name of the club. The board had decided that the new name of the club could not be connected to any of the names of the former clubs. After an indicative vote on the new club's website, the board chose the name "Varden Fotballklubb" after the name of the stadium. "Fotballklubben Fyllingsdalen" received most votes, but the board chose the other name owing to sponsorship interests. The choice of colors was purple, with light blue away shirts.

The choice of name spurred great controversy in the borough, and especially among the members of the club, because the name was not related to the part of the city which the club is located. There even arose a Facebook page named "Vi krever at den nye klubben skifter navn og draktfarge!" ("We demand that the new club change its name and colors"), which attracted more than 1,000 members. After a new in-person vote among the club members, there was an overwhelming majority (117 of 160 votes) that voted for the name "Fotballklubben Fyllingsdalen". The club's colors were not changed.

== Results ==
Season		Pos.	Pl.	W	D	L	GS	GA	P	Cup	Notes
2012	2. divisjon	3	26	14	5	7	51	37	47	R1	
2013	2. divisjon	4	26	11	5	10	41	40	38	R2	
2014	2. divisjon	11	26	9	5	12	47	50	32	R3	
2015	2. divisjon	11	26	8	5	13	44	50	29	R3	
2016	2. divisjon	↓ 8	26	9	8	9	46	38	35	R1	Relegated
2017	3. divisjon	4	26	12	5	9	61	50	41	R2	
2018	3. divisjon	2	26	17	3	6	63	31	54	R3	
2019	3. divisjon	4	26	16	2	8	68	41	50	R2	
2020	3. divisjon	Season cancelled									
2021	3. divisjon	3	13	9	0	4	34	22	27	R2	
2022	3. divisjon	8	26	11	2	13	51	55	35	R1	
2023	3. divisjon	12	26	8	3	15	44	63	27	R1	
2024	3. divisjon	9	26	7	4	15	31	68	25	QR1	
2025	3. divisjon	5	26	13	1	12	50	61	40	QR1	
2026	3. divisjon									QR1	
