= Porsanger IL =

Norwegian sports club

- Full name: Porsanger Idrettslag
- Founded: 1922
- Ground: Lakselv kunstgress, Lakselv
- League: 3. divisjon
Home colours

Porsanger Idrettslag is a Norwegian multi-sports club from Lakselv, Finnmark. It has sections for association football, team handball, track and field, Nordic skiing, floorball and table tennis.

The club was founded in 2005 as a merger of the multi-sports club Lakselv IL and the football club Porsanger FK. The latter had been founded in 1995, whereas the former was founded in 1922; the club now counts this as the founding year.

The men's football team currently plays in the 3. divisjon, the fourth tier of Norwegian football, where it has played since its 2005 foundation. In 2006 the team contested a Playoff to the 2. Divisjon, but lost to Tromsø IL 2 on aggregate.

Lakselv IL had been a 3. Divisjon fixture from 1992 to the 1999 season, when the team was relegated. Porsanger FK was more successful, with a stint in the 2. divisjon from 1996 to 1997 and thereafter a steady run in the 3. Divisjon. Porsanger FK also contested a Playoff to the 2. Divisjon in 2001, but lost to Salangen IF on aggregate. The best known player was Lars Iver Strand.
