= Staal Jørpeland IL =

Norwegian sports club

Staal Jørpeland
- Full name: Staal Jørpeland Idrettslag
- Founded: 1919
- Ground: Jørpeland Stadion, Jørpeland
- League: 3. divisjon
- 2024: 3. divisjon group 2, 7th of 14
Home colours

Staal Jørpeland Idrettslag, also known as just Staal, is a Norwegian sports club from Jørpeland, Rogaland. It has sections for association football, team handball and track and field. The club was founded in 1919, and the club colors are green and black. Their home matches are played at Jørpeland Stadion.

The men's football team currently plays in the Norwegian Third Division, the fourth tier of Norwegian football, after being relegated from the 2022 Norwegian Second Division.

== Football ==
The men's football team played in the Norwegian Third Division consecutively from 1999 until 2021. In the 2010 season, they were close to moving up to the Second Division. They finished the season in first place, but lost to Viking 2 in the promotion play-offs. In 2021, the club earned promotion to the Second Division after beating Express 4–0 in the last game of the 2021 season.

=== Recent seasons ===
Season	League									Cup	Notes
Season	Division	Pos.	Pl.	W	D	L	GS	GA	P	Cup	Notes
2011	3. divisjon	3	26	20	3	3	76	24	63	Second round	
2012	3. divisjon	2	26	16	3	7	75	33	51	Second round	
2013	3. divisjon	2	24	15	4	5	64	35	49	First round	
2014	3. divisjon	2	26	16	3	7	69	39	51	First qualifying round	
2015	3. divisjon	9	26	10	7	9	52	53	37	Second qualifying round	
2016	3. divisjon	1	26	16	4	6	59	28	52	First qualifying round	
2017	3. divisjon	9	26	10	3	13	59	63	33	First round	
2018	3. divisjon	8	26	10	7	9	52	46	37	First round	
2019	3. divisjon	8	26	9	7	10	45	40	34	Second qualifying round	
2020	Season cancelled										
2021	3. divisjon	↑ 1	13	8	3	2	30	18	27	First round	Promoted
2022	2. divisjon	↓ 13	24	3	7	14	34	68	16	First round	Relegated

=== Current squad ===
As of 9 April 2022

Note: Flags indicate national team as defined under FIFA eligibility rules; some limited exceptions apply. Players may hold more than one non-FIFA nationality.

No.	Pos.	Nation	Player
1	GK	NOR	Helge Bjørheim
2	DF	NOR	Vidar Harestad
3	DF	NOR	Espen Helland
4	DF	NOR	Daniel Pollen
6	DF	NOR	David Eie
7	MF	NOR	Ørjan Bjørlo
8	MF	NOR	Kristoffer Ramsland
9	FW	NOR	Cairo Lima
10	FW	NOR	Lars Edvard Danielsen
11	MF	NOR	Aleksander Hinna
12	GK	NOR	Magnus Bjørheim Mæland
13	DF	BIH	Jasmin Bogdanovic

No.	Pos.	Nation	Player
14	DF	NOR	Pål Fjelde
15	DF	NOR	Sivert Seljeskog
16	FW	NOR	Even Østensen
17	DF	POL	Daniel Ciach
18	MF	NOR	Georg André Danielsen
19	MF	NOR	Leo Buochentouf
21	DF	NOR	Isak Tobias Asheim
22	DF	NOR	Mats Gresvik Lunde
23	DF	NOR	Josef Abinet Årvik
25	MF	NOR	Jonas Antonio Halsne
29	FW	NOR	Reino Rantasalo
30	GK	POL	Rafal Zygmunt Dobrolinski
