= SF Grei =

Norwegian sports club

- Full name: Sportsforeningen Grei
- Founded: 1 April 1919; 107 years ago
- Ground: Greibanen, Rødtvet
- League: 3. divisjon
- 2024: 4. divisjon / Oslo 2, 1st of 12 (promoted)
Home colours

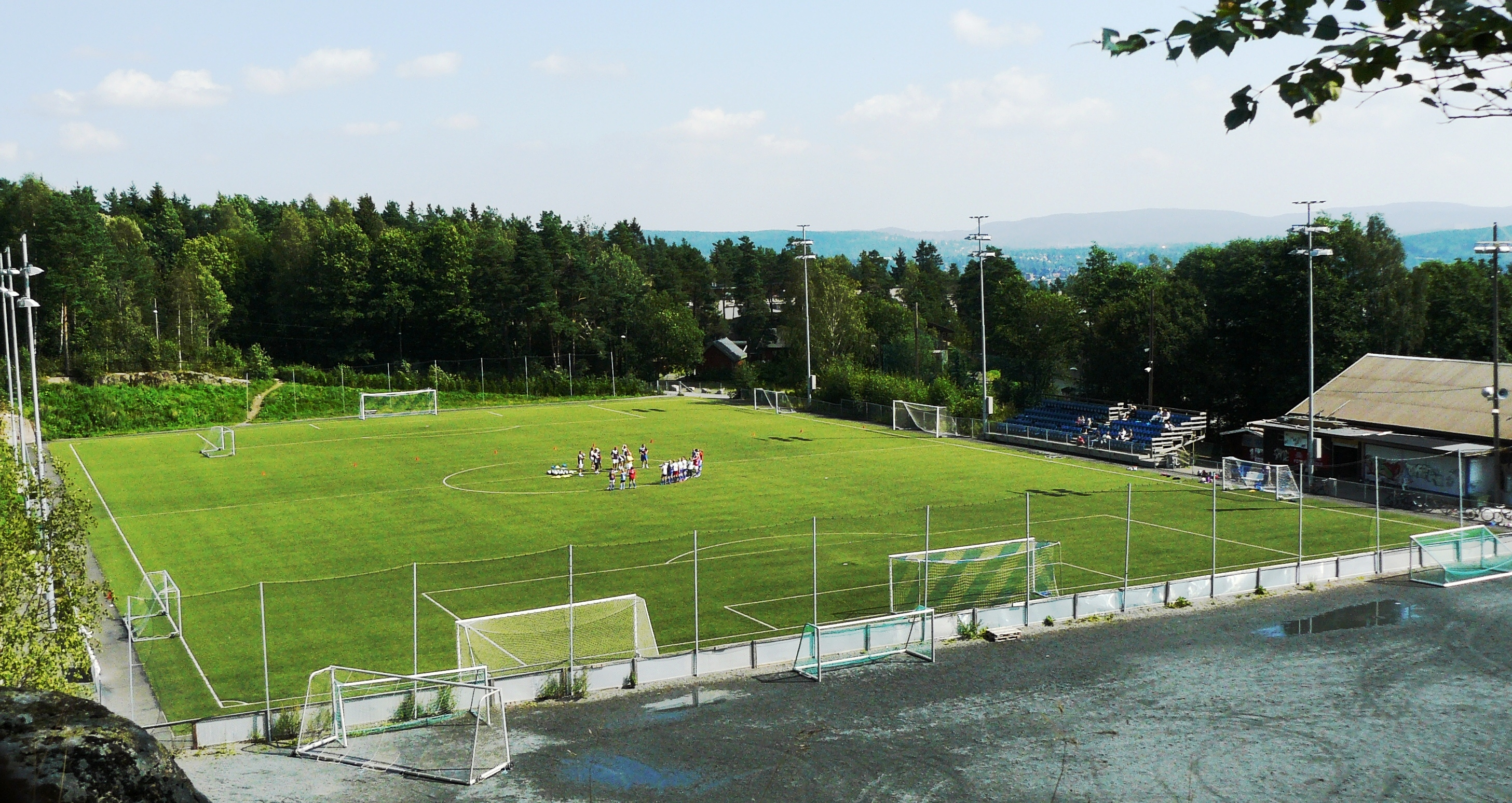
Greibanen

SF Grei is a Norwegian sports club from Rødtvet, Oslo. It currently has sections for association football, floorball and gymnastics.

The women's team cooperated with Linderud IL on the team Linderud-Grei Toppfotball, which played in Toppserien, the highest league, but now exist as Grei Kvinner Elite. The men's team formerly cooperated to form the team Groruddalen BK.

The men's football team currently plays in the 4. divisjon, the fifth tier of Norwegian football. It had a longer stint in the 2. divisjon, and did well with a third place in their group in 1997, before being relegated after the 2000 season. In 2002 they won their 3. divisjon group, but in a play-off they were beaten by Borg Fotball 7–1 on aggregate. It last played in the 3. divisjon in 2009, when it was relegated.
