= 2000 in Norwegian football =

Football in Norway
- Season: 2000

Men's football
- Tippeligaen: Rosenborg
- 1. divisjon: Lyn
- 2. divisjon: Skjetten (Group 1); Lillehammer (Group 2); Ørn Horten (Group 3); Mandalskameratene (Group 4); Hødd (Group 5); Aalesund (Group 6); Stålkameratene (Group 7); Lofoten (Group 8)
- Cupen: Odd Grenland

Women's football
- Toppserien: Trondheims-Ørn
- Cupen: Asker

This article is a summary of 2000 in Norwegian football.

The 2000-season is the 95. season of competitive football in Norway.

== Men's football ==
=== League season ===
==== Tippeligaen ====
Pos	Team	Pld	W	D	L	GF	GA	GD	Pts	Qualification or relegation
1	Rosenborg (C)	26	16	6	4	61	26	+35	54	Qualification for the Champions League third qualifying round
2	Brann	26	14	5	7	53	40	+13	47	Qualification for the Champions League second qualifying round
3	Viking	26	13	6	7	51	39	+12	45	Qualification for the UEFA Cup qualifying round
4	Tromsø	26	13	5	8	51	46	+5	44	
5	Stabæk	26	12	6	8	59	33	+26	42	
6	Lillestrøm	26	11	7	8	42	29	+13	40	
7	Molde	26	11	7	8	46	47	−1	40	
8	Odd Grenland	26	11	5	10	40	31	+9	38	Qualification for the UEFA Cup first round (Note: Odd Grenland qualified as the winner of the 2000 Norwegian Cup.)
9	Moss	26	8	8	10	38	44	−6	32	
10	Bodø/Glimt	26	6	10	10	48	59	−11	28	
11	Bryne	26	7	6	13	32	60	−28	27	
12	Vålerenga (R)	26	5	9	12	32	44	−12	24	Qualification for the relegation play-offs
13	Start (R)	26	5	6	15	40	66	−26	21	Relegation to First Division
14	Haugesund (R)	26	5	4	17	33	62	−29	19	Relegation to First Division

Source: fotball.no
Rules for classification: 1) points; 2) goal difference; 3) number of goals scored.
(C) Champions; (R) Relegated

==== 1. divisjon ====
Pos	Team	Pld	W	D	L	GF	GA	GD	Pts	Promotion or relegation
1	Lyn (C, P)	26	19	4	3	55	24	+31	61	Promotion to Tippeligaen
2	Strømsgodset (P)	26	18	5	3	70	28	+42	59	Promotion to Tippeligaen
3	Sogndal (O, P)	26	15	6	5	73	37	+36	51	Qualification for the promotion play-offs
4	Raufoss	26	11	6	9	50	39	+11	39	
5	Kongsvinger	26	11	6	9	44	38	+6	39	
6	HamKam	26	11	5	10	48	44	+4	38	
7	L/F Hønefoss	26	10	4	12	45	42	+3	34	
8	Kjelsås	26	8	7	11	30	40	−10	31	
9	Tromsdalen	26	9	2	15	37	62	−25	29	
10	Skeid	26	7	7	12	36	52	−16	28	
11	Sandefjord	26	8	4	14	35	53	−18	28	
12	Byåsen	26	9	1	16	33	58	−25	28	
13	Strindheim (R)	26	7	5	14	39	58	−19	26	Relegation to Second Division
14	Eik-Tønsberg (R)	26	6	4	16	28	48	−20	22	Relegation to Second Division

Source: nifs.no
Rules for classification: 1) points; 2) goal difference; 3) number of goals scored.
(C) Champions; (O) Play-off winners; (P) Promoted; (R) Relegated

==== 2. divisjon ====
===== Group 1 =====
Pos	Team	Pld	W	D	L	GF	GA	GD	Pts	Relegation
1	Skjetten	22	14	3	5	61	27	+34	45	
2	Sprint-Jeløy	22	14	3	5	41	22	+19	45	
3	Åsane	22	13	5	4	65	24	+41	44	
4	Pors Grenland	22	11	6	5	47	37	+10	39	
5	Tollnes	22	11	4	7	51	35	+16	37	
6	Lyn 2	22	10	4	8	39	35	+4	34	
7	Ski (Note: Ski did not survive the relegation play-off.) (R)	22	9	5	8	36	37	−1	32	Relegation to Third Division
8	Strømmen (Note: Strømmen was relegated as the third worst eighth-place team.) (R)	22	8	2	12	29	62	−33	26	Relegation to Third Division
9	Mercantile/Lambertseter (R)	22	6	3	13	31	45	−14	21	Relegation to Third Division
10	Drøbak/Frogn (R)	22	5	6	11	32	49	−17	21	Relegation to Third Division
11	Lillestrøm 2 (R)	22	6	0	16	26	51	−25	18	Relegation to Third Division
12	Fossum (R)	22	4	1	17	19	53	−34	13	Relegation to Third Division

Source: rsssf.com
(R) Relegated

===== Group 2 =====
Pos	Team	Pld	W	D	L	GF	GA	GD	Pts	Relegation
1	FF Lillehammer	22	14	4	4	49	27	+22	46	
2	Ullern	22	14	3	5	55	30	+25	45	
3	Fredrikstad	22	13	5	4	57	30	+27	44	
4	Stabæk 2	22	13	3	6	58	28	+30	42	
5	Asker	22	13	3	6	46	24	+22	42	
6	Lørenskog	22	12	4	6	65	37	+28	40	
7	Gjøvik-Lyn (Note: Gjøvik-Lyn survived the relegation play-off.)	22	7	5	10	32	39	−7	26	
8	Elverum (Note: Elverum was relegated as the second worst eighth-place team.) (R)	22	7	4	11	52	50	+2	25	Relegation to Third Division
9	Sarpsborg Fotball (R)	22	6	7	9	33	36	−3	25	Relegation to Third Division
10	Årvoll (R)	22	6	3	13	28	52	−24	21	Relegation to Third Division
11	Vardal (R)	22	4	2	16	25	73	−48	14	Relegation to Third Division
12	Kongsvinger 2 (R)	22	0	3	19	27	101	−74	3	Relegation to Third Division

Source: rsssf.com
(R) Relegated

===== Group 3 =====
Pos	Team	Pld	W	D	L	GF	GA	GD	Pts	Promotion or relegation
1	Ørn-Horten (P)	22	14	4	4	53	30	+23	46	Promotion to First Division
2	Oslo Øst	22	14	2	6	58	37	+21	44	
3	Bærum	22	12	2	8	46	38	+8	38	
4	Odd Grenland 2	22	12	1	9	51	34	+17	37	
5	Ullensaker/Kisa	22	12	0	10	39	36	+3	36	
6	Kvik Halden	22	11	2	9	41	42	−1	35	
7	Vålerenga 2 (Note: Vålerenga 2 was forcibly relegated because their first team was relegated to the First Division.) (R)	22	9	6	7	40	28	+12	33	Relegation to Third Division
8	Eidsvold Turn (Note: Eidsvold Turn survived the relegation play-off.)	22	10	2	10	40	43	−3	32	
9	Skarphedin (R)	22	9	4	9	48	38	+10	31	Relegation to Third Division
10	Grei (R)	22	6	3	13	34	36	−2	21	Relegation to Third Division
11	Rakkestad (R)	22	6	0	16	46	80	−34	18	Relegation to Third Division
12	Eik-Tønsberg 2 (R)	22	3	2	17	24	78	−54	11	Relegation to Third Division

Source: rsssf.com
(P) Promoted; (R) Relegated

===== Group 4 =====
Pos	Team	Pld	W	D	L	GF	GA	GD	Pts	Promotion or relegation
1	Mandalskameratene (P)	22	16	2	4	71	28	+43	50	Promotion to First Division
2	Vidar	22	16	2	4	59	29	+30	50	
3	Viking 2	22	13	5	4	72	37	+35	44	
4	Vard Haugesund	22	11	7	4	56	27	+29	40	
5	Start 2 (Note: Start 2 was forcibly relegated because their first team was relegated to the First Division.) (R)	22	9	6	7	54	41	+13	33	Relegation to Third Division
6	Stord	22	8	6	8	61	53	+8	30	
7	Sandnes (Note: Sandnes and Nord survived the relegation play-off.)	22	8	5	9	34	46	−12	29	
8	Nord	22	9	1	12	51	56	−5	28	
9	Flekkefjord (R)	22	6	4	12	36	64	−28	22	Relegation to Third Division
10	Randaberg (R)	22	6	4	12	27	56	−29	22	Relegation to Third Division
11	Vigør (R)	22	4	3	15	36	58	−22	15	Relegation to Third Division
12	Hundvåg (R)	22	3	1	18	22	84	−62	10	Relegation to Third Division

Source: rsssf.com
(P) Promoted; (R) Relegated

===== Group 5 =====
Pos	Team	Pld	W	D	L	GF	GA	GD	Pts	Promotion or relegation
1	Hødd (P)	22	17	2	3	61	25	+36	53	Promotion to First Division
2	Fyllingen	22	14	3	5	53	30	+23	45	
3	Løv-Ham	22	14	2	6	55	27	+28	44	
4	Fana	22	11	4	7	52	33	+19	37	
5	Førde	22	10	4	8	47	43	+4	34	
6	Tornado	22	10	4	8	29	27	+2	34	
7	Florø	22	10	4	8	40	39	+1	34	
8	Os (Note: Os did not survive the relegation play-off.) (R)	22	8	4	10	46	33	+13	28	Relegation to Third Division
9	Fjøra (R)	22	8	3	11	39	59	−20	27	Relegation to Third Division
10	Ny-Krohnborg (R)	22	7	3	12	47	55	−8	24	Relegation to Third Division
11	Ørsta (R)	22	3	2	17	30	75	−45	11	Relegation to Third Division
12	Jotun (R)	22	2	1	19	24	77	−53	7	Relegation to Third Division

Source: rsssf.com
(P) Promoted; (R) Relegated

===== Group 6 =====
Pos	Team	Pld	W	D	L	GF	GA	GD	Pts	Promotion or relegation
1	Aalesund (P)	22	18	2	2	81	16	+65	56	Promotion to First Division
2	Skarbøvik	22	17	3	2	65	21	+44	54	
3	Clausenengen	22	14	4	4	79	37	+42	46	
4	Molde 2	22	12	4	6	57	43	+14	40	
5	Spjelkavik	22	12	0	10	38	46	−8	36	
6	Rosenborg 2	22	11	1	10	46	40	+6	34	
7	Træff (Note: Træff survived the relegation play-off.)	22	9	4	9	49	35	+14	31	
8	Stranda (Note: Stranda was relegated as the worst eighth-place team.) (R)	22	6	5	11	29	44	−15	23	Relegation to Third Division
9	Orkla (R)	22	5	5	12	30	62	−32	20	Relegation to Third Division
10	Dahle (R)	22	4	3	15	28	70	−42	15	Relegation to Third Division
11	Tiller (R)	22	4	3	15	39	82	−43	15	Relegation to Third Division
12	Sunndal (R)	22	2	2	18	25	70	−45	8	Relegation to Third Division

Source: rsssf.com
(P) Promoted; (R) Relegated

===== Group 7 =====
Pos	Team	Pld	W	D	L	GF	GA	GD	Pts	Relegation
1	Stålkameratene	22	16	2	4	72	34	+38	50	
2	Verdal	22	15	1	6	55	40	+15	46	
3	Ranheim	22	12	5	5	59	34	+25	41	
4	Steinkjer	22	13	2	7	58	38	+20	41	
5	Harstad	22	11	5	6	48	33	+15	38	
6	Mo	22	9	7	6	40	44	−4	34	
7	Fauske/Sprint (Note: Fauske/Sprint survived the relegation play-off.)	22	11	1	10	47	52	−5	34	
8	Kolstad (Note: Kolstad did not survive the relegation play-off.) (R)	22	9	2	11	48	50	−2	29	Relegation to Third Division
9	Mosjøen (R)	22	9	1	12	38	43	−5	28	Relegation to Third Division
10	Levanger (R)	22	7	5	10	29	37	−8	26	Relegation to Third Division
11	Steigen (R)	22	4	0	18	41	69	−28	12	Relegation to Third Division
12	Bodø/Glimt 2 (R)	22	0	1	21	24	85	−61	1	Relegation to Third Division

Source: rsssf.com
(R) Relegated

===== Group 8 =====
Pos	Team	Pld	W	D	L	GF	GA	GD	Pts	Relegation
1	Lofoten	22	20	0	2	90	25	+65	60	
2	Alta	22	19	0	3	99	34	+65	57	
3	Narvik	22	11	4	7	50	43	+7	37	
4	Skjervøy	22	10	5	7	46	42	+4	35	
5	Finnsnes	22	10	3	9	46	48	−2	33	
6	Skarp	22	10	2	10	46	40	+6	32	
7	Grovfjord (Note: Grovfjord and Lyngen/Karnes did not survive the relegation play-off.) (R)	22	9	4	9	43	52	−9	31	Relegation to Third Division
8	Lyngen/Karnes (R)	22	9	3	10	53	53	0	30	Relegation to Third Division
9	Senja (R)	22	9	0	13	48	67	−19	27	Relegation to Third Division
10	Vesterålen (R)	22	6	5	11	49	60	−11	23	Relegation to Third Division
11	Salangen (R)	22	3	3	16	38	80	−42	12	Relegation to Third Division
12	Bossekop (R)	22	0	3	19	31	95	−64	3	Relegation to Third Division

Source: rsssf.com
(R) Relegated

=== Norwegian Cup ===
==== Final ====
29 October 2000
13:15 CET (UTC+1)

Odd Grenland	2–1 (a.e.t.)	Viking
Tihinen 65' (o.g.); Flindt Bjerg 106'	Report	Dahl 43'

Ullevaal Stadion, Oslo
Attendance: 24,864
Referee: Frode Kvam (Strindheim)

== Women's football ==
=== League season ===
==== Toppserien ====
Pos	Team	Pld	W	D	L	GF	GA	GD	Pts	Qualification or relegation
1	Trondheims-Ørn (C)	18	16	0	2	62	14	+48	48	Qualification for the UEFA Women's Cup second qualifying round
2	Asker	18	15	2	1	64	20	+44	47	
3	Kolbotn	18	11	2	5	47	27	+20	35	
4	Bjørnar	18	9	3	6	52	30	+22	30	
5	Athene Moss	18	9	3	6	48	29	+19	30	
6	Klepp	18	8	1	9	27	26	+1	25	
7	Byåsen	18	4	1	13	17	47	−30	13	
8	Setskog/Høland	18	4	0	14	27	78	−51	12	
9	Larvik (R)	18	3	2	13	19	55	−36	11	Relegation to First Division
10	Grand Bodø (R)	18	3	2	13	18	55	−37	11	Relegation to First Division

Source: NIFS
Rules for classification: 1) points; 2) goal difference; 3) number of goals scored.
(C) Champions; (R) Relegated

=== Norwegian Women's Cup ===
==== Final ====
- Asker 4–1 Bjørnar

== National teams ==
=== Norway men's national football team ===
==== UEFA Euro 2000 ====
Team	Pld	W	D	L	GF	GA	GD	Pts
Spain	3	2	0	1	6	5	+1	6
FR Yugoslavia	3	1	1	1	7	7	0	4
Norway	3	1	1	1	1	1	0	4
Slovenia	3	0	2	1	4	5	−1	2

==== 2002 FIFA World Cup qualification (UEFA) ====
===== Group 5 =====
Team	Pld	W	D	L	GF	GA	GD	Pts
Poland	3	2	1	0	6	2	4	7
Belarus	3	2	0	1	5	5	0	6
Ukraine	3	2	0	1	5	5	0	6
Wales	3	0	2	1	2	3	−1	2
Norway	3	0	2	1	1	2	−1	2
Armenia	3	0	1	2	3	5	−2	1

==== Fixtures and results ====
Date	Venue	Opponents	Score	Competition	Norwegian goalscorers
31 January	La Manga Stadium, La Manga (N)	Iceland	0 – 0	Nordic Cup	
2 February	La Manga Stadium, La Manga (N)	Denmark	4 – 2	Nordic Cup	Henning Berg (2); Andreas Lund (2)
4 February	La Manga Stadium, La Manga (N)	Sweden	1 – 1	Nordic Cup	John Carew
23 February	Ali Sami Yen stadium, Istanbul (A)	Turkey	2 – 0	Friendly	John Arne Riise; Roar Strand
29 March	Stadio di Cornaredo, Lugano (A)	Switzerland	2 – 2	Friendly	Ståle Solbakken; Bent Skammelsrud
26 April	Ullevaal Stadion, Oslo (H)	Belgium	0 – 2	Friendly	
27 May	Ullevaal Stadion, Oslo (H)	Slovakia	2 – 0	Friendly	Ole Gunnar Solskjær; Steffen Iversen
3 June	Ullevaal Stadion, Oslo (H)	Italy	1 – 0	Friendly	John Carew
13 Juni	Feijenoord Stadion, Rotterdam (N)	Spain	1 – 0 Report	UEFA Euro 2000	Steffen Iversen
18 Juni	Stade Maurice Dufrasne, Liège (N)	FR Yugoslavia	0 – 1 Report	UEFA Euro 2000	
21 Juni	Gelredome, Arnhem (N)	Slovenia	0 – 0 Report	UEFA Euro 2000	
16 August	Finnair Stadium, Helsinki (A)	Finland	1 – 3	Nordic Cup	Thorstein Helstad
2 September	Ullevaal Stadion, Oslo (H)	Armenia	0 – 0 Report	World Cup Qualifier	
7 October	Millennium Stadium, Cardiff (A)	Wales	1 – 1 Report	World Cup Qualifier	Thorstein Helstad
11 October	Ullevaal Stadion, Oslo (H)	Ukraine	0 – 1 Report	World Cup Qualifier	

Key

- H = Home match
- A = Away match
- N = Neutral ground
