= 2014 Norwegian Third Division =

3. divisjon
- Season: 2014

The 2014 season of the 3. divisjon, the fourth highest association football league for men in Norway.

Between 22 and 26 games (depending on group size) are played in 12 groups, with 3 points given for wins and 1 for draws. Twelve group winners are promoted to the 2. divisjon.

== Tables ==
Group 1

1. Sprint-Jeløy – promoted
2. Kråkerøy
3. Oppsal
4. Fredrikstad 2
5. Trosvik
6. Follo 2
7. Sarpsborg 08 2
8. Grorud 2
9. Nesodden
10. Selbak
11. Østsiden
12. Rustad – relegated
13. Sparta – relegated
14. Kolbotn – relegated

Group 2

1. Ullern – promoted
2. Frigg
3. Hauerseter
4. Strømmen 2
5. Hasle-Løren
6. Lyn 2
7. Korsvoll
8. Røa
9. Oslo City
10. Oldenborg
11. Ull/Kisa IL 2
12. Romsås – relegated
13. Lørenskog 2 – relegated
14. Kjelsås 2 – relegated

Group 3

1. Lillestrøm 2 – promoted
2. Funnefoss/Vormsund
3. Ottestad
4. Lillehammer
5. Flisa
6. Grue
7. Rælingen
8. Ham-Kam 2
9. Moelven
10. Gjøvik-Lyn 2
11. Raufoss 2
12. Gran – relegated
13. Sander – relegated
14. Storhamar – relegated

Group 4

1. Drammen FK – promoted
2. Jevnaker
3. Lommedalen
4. Odd 3
5. Modum
6. Åssiden
7. Bærum 2
8. Vestfossen
9. Lokomotiv Oslo
10. Mjøndalen 2
11. Skarphedin
12. Hønefoss 2 – relegated
13. Asker 2 – relegated:
  Kjapp – pulled team

Group 5

1. Donn – promoted
2. Tønsberg
3. Tollnes
4. Start 2
5. Randesund
6. Vigør
7. Pors 2 – relegated
8. Sandefjord 2
9. Mandalskameratene
10. Lyngdal
11. Larvik Turn
12. Urædd – relegated
13. Runar – relegated
14. Re – relegated

Group 6

1. Sola – promoted
2. Staal
3. Kopervik
4. Viking 2
5. Frøyland
6. Randaberg
7. Vardeneset
8. Bryne 2
9. Åkra
10. Vaulen
11. Sandnes Ulf 2
12. Klepp – relegated
13. Hundvåg – relegated
14. Austrått – relegated

Group 7

1. Odda – promoted
2. Sotra
3. Lysekloster
4. Bjarg
5. Haugesund 2
6. Os
7. Øystese
8. Vard 2
9. Vadmyra
10. Varegg
11. Lyngbø
12. Fyllingsdalen 2
13. Smørås – relegated
14. Frøya – relegated

Group 8

1. Aalesund 2 – promoted
2. Stryn
3. Sogndal 2
4. Tertnes
5. Hødd 2
6. Spjelkavik
7. Skarbøvik
8. Eid
9. Bergsøy
10. Årdal
11. Arna-Bjørnar
12. Tornado Måløy – relegated
13. Norborg – relegated
14. Larsnes/Gursken – relegated

Group 9

1. Strindheim – promoted
2. Brattvåg
3. Orkla
4. Sverresborg
5. Kolstad
6. KIL/Hemne
7. Heimdal
8. Buvik
9. Kristiansund 2
10. Charlottenlund
11. Nardo 2
12. Averøykameratene – relegated
13. Sunndal – relegated
14. Træff 2 – relegated

Group 10

1. Stjørdals-Blink – promoted
2. Tynset
3. Skedsmo
4. Steinkjer
5. Verdal
6. Gjerdrum
7. NTNUI
8. Ranheim 2
9. Alvdal
10. Åfjord
11. Byåsen 2
12. Fet – relegated
13. Rørvik – relegated
14. Fjellhamar – relegated

Group 11

1. Mjølner – promoted
2. Bodø/Glimt 2
3. Junkeren
4. Sandnessjøen
5. Mosjøen
6. Stålkameratene
7. Tverlandet
8. Sortland
9. Grand Bodø
10. Lofoten – relegated
11. Innstranden – relegated
12. Hardhaus – relegated

Group 12

1. Senja – promoted
2. Fløya
3. Kirkenes
4. Tromsø 2
5. Hammerfest
6. Bossekop
7. Skjervøy
8. Ishavsbyen
9. Porsanger
10. Skarp
11. Bjørnevatn
12. Sørøy/Glimt – relegated
