= 2013 Norwegian Third Division =

3. divisjon
- Season: 2013

The 2013 season of the 3. divisjon, the fourth highest association football league for men in Norway.

Between 22 and 26 games (depending on group size) are played in 12 groups, with 3 points given for wins and 1 for draws. Twelve group winners are promoted to the 2. divisjon.

== Tables ==
=== Group 1 ===
Locations of the teams in 3. divisjon group 1, 2013. Akershus county highlighted
Locations of the teams in 3. divisjon group 1, 2013. Østfold county highlighted

1. Skeid – promoted
2. Sprint-Jeløy
3. Kråkerøy
4. Oslo City
5. Follo 2
6. Oppsal
7. Rustad
8. Fredrikstad 2
9. Sarpsborg 08 2
10. Sparta
11. Romsås
12. Askim – relegated
13. Nesodden 2 – relegated
14. Bøler – relegated

=== Group 2 ===
Locations of the teams in 3. divisjon group 2, 2013. Akershus county highlighted

1. Stabæk 2 – promoted
2. Flisa
3. Hasle-Løren
4. Funnefoss/Vormsund
5. Lyn 2
6. Hauerseter
7. Fjellhamar
8. Korsvoll
9. Grorud 2
10. Sander
11. Lørenskog 2
12. Gjerdrum
13. Kongsvinger 2 – relegated
14. Holmlia – relegated

=== Group 3 ===
Locations of the teams in 3. divisjon group 3, 2013. Hedmark county highlighted
Locations of the teams in 3. divisjon group 3, 2013. Sør-Trøndelag county highlighted

1. Brumunddal – promoted
2. Lillestrøm 2
3. Kolstad
4. Lillehammer
5. Ottestad
6. Strømmen 2
7. Ham-Kam 2
8. Storhamar
9. Alvdal
10. Ull/Kisa IL 2
11. Sverresborg
12. Skjetten – relegated
13. Fart – relegated
14. Tangmoen – relegated

=== Group 4 ===
Locations of the teams in 3. divisjon group 4, 2013. Akershus county highlighted
Locations of the teams in 3. divisjon group 4, 2013. Buskerud county highlighted.

1. Holmen – promoted
2. Ullern
3. Modum
4. Jevnaker
5. Lommedalen
6. Mjøndalen 2
7. Bærum 2
8. Gjøvik-Lyn – to be replaced by Gjøvik-Lyn 2
9. Hønefoss 2
10. Asker 2
11. Raufoss 2
12. Nordre Land – relegated
13. Stoppen – relegated
14. Drammens BK – relegated

=== Group 5 ===
Locations of the teams in 3. divisjon group 5, 2013. Buskerud county highlighted
Locations of the teams in 3. divisjon group 5, 2013. Vestfold county highlighted

1. Ørn-Horten – promoted
2. Sandefjord 2
3. Larvik Turn
4. Tollnes
5. Urædd
6. Drammen
7. Tønsberg 2 – relegated
8. Skarphedin
9. Odd 3
10. Runar
11. Pors 2
12. Flint – relegated
13. Notodden 2 – relegated
14. Solberg – relegated

=== Group 6 ===
Locations of the teams in 3. divisjon group 6, 2013. Rogaland county highlighted
Locations of the teams in 3. divisjon group 6, 2013. Aust-Agder county highlighted

1. Jerv – promoted
2. Staal
3. Start 2
4. Vigør
5. Mandalskameratene
6. Frøyland
7. Klepp
8. Donn
9. Bryne 2
10. Sandnes Ulf 2
11. Lyngdal
12. Eiger – relegated
13. Flekkefjord – relegated
- Herkules – pulled team

=== Group 7 ===
Locations of the teams in 3. divisjon group 7, 2013. Hordaland county highlighted
Locations of the teams in 3. divisjon group 7, 2013. Rogaland county highlighted

1. Stord – promoted
2. Lysekloster
3. Vardeneset
4. Øystese
5. Haugesund 2
6. Kopervik
7. Os
8. Randaberg
9. Hundvåg
10. Vaulen
11. Åkra
12. Fyllingsdalen 2
13. Austevoll – relegated
14. Brodd – relegated

=== Group 8 ===
Locations of the teams in 3. divisjon group 8, 2013. Sogn og Fjordane county highlighted
Locations of the teams in 3. divisjon group 8, 2013. Hordaland county highlighted

1. Florø – promoted
2. Lyngbø
3. Bjarg
4. Vadmyra
5. Varegg
6. Sogndal 2
7. Tornado Måløy
8. Tertnes
9. Årdal
10. Sotra
11. Stryn
12. Voss – relegated
13. Vik – relegated
- Radøy/Manger – pulled team

=== Group 9 ===
Locations of the teams in 3. divisjon group 9, 2013. Møre og Romsdal county highlighted

1. Herd – promoted
2. Brattvåg
3. Kristiansund 2
4. Bergsøy
5. Aalesund 2
6. Averøykameratene
7. Hødd 2
8. Sunndal
9. Elnesvågen/Omegn – relegated
10. Larsnes/Gursken
11. Spjelkavik
12. Volda – relegated
13. Surnadal – relegated
14. Stranda – relegated

=== Group 10 ===
Locations of the teams in 3. divisjon group 10, 2013. Sør-Trøndelag county highlighted

1. Tiller – promoted
2. Stjørdals-Blink
3. Verdal
4. Buvik
5. Tynset
6. Orkla
7. Steinkjer
8. KIL/Hemne
9. Byåsen 2
10. NTNUI
11. Ranheim 2
12. Charlottenlund
13. Meldal – relegated
14. Rosenborg 3 – relegated

=== Group 11 ===
Locations of the teams in 3. divisjon group 11, 2013. Nordland county highlighted

1. Medkila – promoted
2. Mjølner
3. Bodø/Glimt 2
4. Lofoten
5. Stålkameratene
6. Tverlandet
7. Mosjøen
8. Sortland
9. Steigen – relegated
10. Sandnessjøen
11. Junkeren
12. Innstranden

=== Group 12 ===
Locations of the teams in 3. divisjon group 12, 2013. Troms county highlighted
Locations of the teams in 3. divisjon group 12, 2013. Finnmark county highlighted

1. Finnsnes – promoted
2. Fløya
3. Porsanger
4. Skarp
5. Hammerfest
6. Kirkenes
7. Senja 2 – relegated
8. Ishavsbyen
9. Bjørnevatn
10. Lyngen/Karnes – relegated
11. Norild – relegated
12. Tverrelvdalen – relegated
