= 2013 Norwegian Second Division =

2. divisjon
- Season: 2013
- Champions: Bærum, Alta, Nest-Sotra, Tromsdalen

The 2013 2. divisjon (often referred to as Oddsen-ligaen for sponsorship reasons) was a Norwegian football league that started on 13 April 2013 and ended on 19 October 2013. The league consisted of 56 teams divided into 4 groups of 14 teams. The four group-winners, Bærum, Alta, Nest-Sotra and Tromsdalen was promoted to the 1. divisjon, while the bottom three teams in each groups was relegated to the 3. divisjon.

== Teams ==
Alta, Notodden, Bærum and Tromsdalen were relegated from the 2012 1. divisjon, while Elverum, Kristiansund, Vard Haugesund and Follo were promoted to the 2013 1. divisjon.

Ørn-Horten, Lillehammer, Brumunddal, Skeid, Buvik, Aalesund 2, Jerv, Mandalskameratene, Randaberg, Mjølner, Finnsnes and Stabæk 2 were relegated from 2012 2. divisjon.

Drøbak/Frogn, Skedsmo, Lyn, Eidsvold Turn, Arendal, Viking 2, Arna-Bjørnar, Førde, Skarbøvik, Strindheim, Harstad (Note: Bodø/Glimt 2 won the group, but as Bodø/Glimt are playing in the 1. divisjon, Harstad were promoted instead) and Bossekop were promoted from 2012 3. divisjon as winners of their groups.

The 4 teams relegated from the 1. divisjon and the 12 teams promoted from the 3. divisjon, will join the 40 teams positioned in 2nd to 11th place in last season's 2. divisjon.

== League tables ==
The league consisted of 56 teams divided into 4 groups:

=== Group 1 ===
Pos	Team	Pld	W	D	L	GF	GA	GD	Pts	Promotion or relegation
1	Bærum (P)	26	19	3	4	84	38	+46	60	Promotion to First Division
2	Asker	26	17	5	4	80	37	+43	56	
3	Førde	26	17	0	9	64	47	+17	51	
4	Træff	26	13	3	10	45	46	−1	42	
5	Kvik Halden	26	12	5	9	34	35	−1	41	
6	Kjelsås	26	12	4	10	39	37	+2	40	
7	Drøbak-Frogn	26	12	4	10	41	47	−6	40	
8	Vålerenga 2	26	12	0	14	47	47	0	36	
9	Moss	26	10	3	13	47	53	−6	33	
10	Birkebeineren	26	10	3	13	38	46	−8	33	
11	Molde 2	26	9	1	16	49	63	−14	28	
12	Skarbøvik (R)	26	7	5	14	45	52	−7	26	Relegation to Third Division
13	Østsiden (R)	26	6	5	15	35	50	−15	23	Relegation to Third Division
14	Nesodden (R)	26	3	5	18	23	73	−50	14	Relegation to Third Division

Source: nifs.no
Rules for classification: 1) points; 2) goal difference; 3) number of goals scored.
(P) Promoted; (R) Relegated

=== Group 2 ===
Pos	Team	Pld	W	D	L	GF	GA	GD	Pts	Promotion or relegation
1	Alta (P)	26	18	3	5	71	35	+36	57	Promotion to First Division
2	Raufoss	26	16	3	7	54	35	+19	51	
3	Fram Larvik	26	14	8	4	62	34	+28	50	
4	Lyn	26	11	8	7	47	32	+15	41	
5	Pors Grenland	26	12	5	9	44	44	0	41	
6	Nybergsund-Trysil	26	11	7	8	50	56	−6	40	
7	Valdres	26	11	4	11	49	46	+3	37	
8	Strømsgodset 2	26	11	1	14	59	77	−18	34	
9	Gjøvik FF	26	9	6	11	39	48	−9	33	
10	Harstad	26	8	8	10	44	44	0	32	
11	Odd 2	26	9	5	12	41	60	−19	32	
12	Frigg (R)	26	7	4	15	42	45	−3	25	Relegation to Third Division
13	FK Tønsberg (R)	26	5	5	16	44	67	−23	20	Relegation to Third Division
14	Bossekop (R)	26	4	5	17	28	51	−23	17	Relegation to Third Division

Source: nifs.no
Rules for classification: 1) points; 2) goal difference; 3) number of goals scored.
(P) Promoted; (R) Relegated

=== Group 3 ===
Pos	Team	Pld	W	D	L	GF	GA	GD	Pts	Promotion or relegation
1	Nest-Sotra (P)	26	20	3	3	74	25	+49	63	Promotion to First Division
2	Vindbjart	26	15	4	7	67	38	+29	49	
3	Notodden	26	13	3	10	48	34	+14	42	
4	Fyllingsdalen	26	11	5	10	42	44	−2	38	
5	Arendal	26	11	4	11	36	42	−6	37	
6	Brann 2	26	11	2	13	54	54	0	35	
7	Egersund	26	10	5	11	41	45	−4	35	
8	Fana	26	10	5	11	40	47	−7	35	
9	Ålgård	26	9	6	11	38	38	0	33	
10	Åsane	26	10	3	13	45	48	−3	33	
11	Vidar	26	10	3	13	49	66	−17	33	
12	Flekkerøy	26	8	6	12	40	45	−5	30	
13	Viking 2 (R)	26	8	6	12	34	43	−9	30	Relegation to Third Division
14	Arna-Bjørnar (R)	26	8	1	17	28	67	−39	25	Relegation to Third Division

Source: nifs.no
Rules for classification: 1) points; 2) goal difference; 3) number of goals scored.
(P) Promoted; (R) Relegated

=== Group 4 ===
Pos	Team	Pld	W	D	L	GF	GA	GD	Pts	Promotion or relegation
1	Tromsdalen (P)	26	19	5	2	70	31	+39	62	Promotion to First Division
2	KFUM Oslo	26	17	6	3	62	26	+36	57	
3	Levanger	26	13	5	8	61	43	+18	44	
4	Grorud	26	11	7	8	60	51	+9	40	
5	Byåsen	26	12	4	10	52	44	+8	40	
6	Mo	26	12	4	10	47	44	+3	40	
7	Eidsvold TF	26	10	6	10	43	51	−8	36	
8	Tromsø 2 (R)	26	11	1	14	51	77	−26	34	Relegation to Third Division
9	Nardo	26	8	8	10	50	49	+1	32	
10	Lørenskog	26	8	7	11	49	56	−7	31	
11	Rosenborg 2	26	8	6	12	52	63	−11	30	
12	Strindheim (R)	26	6	5	15	51	60	−9	23	Relegation to Third Division
13	Skedsmo (R)	26	5	6	15	32	68	−36	21	Relegation to Third Division
14	Senja (R)	26	6	2	18	41	58	−17	20	Relegation to Third Division

Source: nifs.no
Rules for classification: 1) points; 2) goal difference; 3) number of goals scored.
(P) Promoted; (R) Relegated
