= 2011 Norwegian Third Division =

3. divisjon
- Season: 2011

The 2011 season of the 3. divisjon, the fourth highest association football league for men in Norway.

Between 22 and 26 games (depending on group size) are played in 12 groups, with 3 points given for wins and 1 for draws. Twelve group winners are promoted to the 2. divisjon.

The 3. divisjon was streamlined to only 12 groups, compared to 24 groups in 2010.

== Tables ==
=== Group 1 ===
Pos	Team	Pld	W	D	L	GF	GA	GD	Pts	Promotion or relegation
1	Østsiden (P)	24	17	3	4	88	28	+60	54	Promotion to 2. divisjon
2	Oslo City	24	16	3	5	54	32	+22	51	
3	Drøbak/Frogn	24	15	3	6	58	30	+28	48	
4	Sprint-Jeløy	24	14	3	7	64	44	+20	45	
5	Holmlia	24	14	1	9	51	39	+12	43	
6	Nordstrand	24	13	3	8	47	39	+8	42	
7	Fredrikstad 2	24	13	0	11	53	46	+7	39	
8	Frigg 2	24	9	2	13	38	58	−20	29	
9	Bøler	24	8	4	12	30	37	−7	28	
10	Follo 2	24	8	2	14	44	68	−24	26	
11	Trosvik	24	7	1	16	37	51	−14	22	
12	Borgen (R)	24	5	1	18	31	67	−36	16	Relegation to 4. divisjon
13	Lille Tøyen (R)	24	4	0	20	23	85	−62	12	Relegation to 4. divisjon
–	Manglerud Star 2 (Note: Manglerud Star was bankrupted, and withdrew all teams on 4 April 2011.) (R)	0	0	0	0	0	0	0	0	Relegation to 4. divisjon

Source: speaker.no
Rules for classification: 1) points; 2) goal difference; 3) number of goals scored.
(P) Promoted; (R) Relegated

=== Group 2 ===
Pos	Team	Pld	W	D	L	GF	GA	GD	Pts	Promotion or relegation
1	Gjøvik (P)	26	22	3	1	96	23	+73	69	Promotion to 2. divisjon
2	Eidsvold Turn	26	21	1	4	117	34	+83	64	
3	Ottestad	26	16	4	6	85	42	+43	52	
4	Flisa	26	14	2	10	58	44	+14	44	
5	Moelven	26	12	3	11	62	51	+11	39	
6	Kongsvinger 2	26	12	3	11	54	63	−9	39	
7	Ham-Kam 2	26	11	5	10	54	54	0	38	
8	Funnefoss/Vormsund	26	12	2	12	65	69	−4	38	
9	Nordre Land	26	11	3	12	44	65	−21	36	
10	Eidskog	26	9	3	14	48	65	−17	30	
11	Nybergsund 2	26	8	3	15	45	58	−13	27	
12	Kolbu/KK (R)	26	7	4	15	42	67	−25	25	Relegation to 4. divisjon
13	Faaberg (R)	26	5	4	17	37	67	−30	19	Relegation to 4. divisjon
14	Stange (R)	26	2	0	24	25	120	−95	6	Relegation to 4. divisjon

Source: speaker.no
Rules for classification: 1) points; 2) goal difference; 3) number of goals scored.
(P) Promoted; (R) Relegated

=== Group 3 ===
Pos	Team	Pld	W	D	L	GF	GA	GD	Pts	Promotion or relegation
1	Grorud (P)	26	21	1	4	92	26	+66	64	Promotion to 2. divisjon
2	Lillestrøm 2	26	20	3	3	84	31	+53	63	
3	Korsvoll	26	17	3	6	74	42	+32	54	
4	Røa	26	15	4	7	63	45	+18	49	
5	Skedsmo	26	13	6	7	57	40	+17	45	
6	Ullern	26	12	5	9	56	40	+16	41	
7	Fjellhamar	26	12	3	11	62	54	+8	39	
8	Strømmen 2	26	10	3	13	44	67	−23	33	
9	Romsås	26	7	6	13	43	52	−9	27	
10	Vestli	26	6	7	13	47	60	−13	25	
11	Lørenskog 2	26	7	4	15	54	66	−12	25	
12	Høland (R)	26	6	4	16	46	80	−34	22	Relegation to 4. divisjon
13	Kjelsås 2 (R)	26	4	4	18	39	85	−46	16	Relegation to 4. divisjon
14	Flisbyen (R)	26	4	3	19	26	101	−75	15	Relegation to 4. divisjon

Source: speaker.no
Rules for classification: 1) points; 2) goal difference; 3) number of goals scored.
(P) Promoted; (R) Relegated

=== Group 4 ===
Pos	Team	Pld	W	D	L	GF	GA	GD	Pts	Promotion or relegation
1	Birkebeineren	26	22	3	1	94	22	+72	69	Promotion to 2. divisjon
2	Hønefoss 2	26	15	1	10	87	67	+20	46	
3	Asker 2	26	13	5	8	79	47	+32	44	
4	Eik-Tønsberg	26	13	4	9	56	49	+7	43	
5	Modum	26	12	3	11	50	55	−5	39	
6	Flint	26	12	2	12	69	76	−7	38	
7	Bærum 2	26	11	4	11	76	60	+16	37	
8	Lommedalen	26	10	7	9	63	52	+11	37	
9	Mjøndalen 2	26	11	4	11	69	65	+4	37	
10	Sparta/Bragerøen	26	10	4	12	46	59	−13	34	
11	Kongsberg	26	9	3	14	40	55	−15	30	
12	FK Tønsberg 2 (R)	26	8	5	13	47	60	−13	29	Relegation to 4. divisjon
13	Jutul (R)	26	7	1	18	53	110	−57	22	Relegation to 4. divisjon
14	Re (R)	26	5	2	19	33	85	−52	17	Relegation to 4. divisjon

Source: speaker.no
Rules for classification: 1) points; 2) goal difference; 3) number of goals scored.
(R) Relegated

=== Group 5 ===
Pos	Team	Pld	W	D	L	GF	GA	GD	Pts	Promotion or relegation
1	Jerv (P)	24	20	2	2	105	16	+89	62	Promotion to 2. divisjon
2	Skarphedin	24	18	4	2	88	33	+55	58	
3	Arendal	24	15	2	7	82	41	+41	47	
4	Vigør	24	13	4	7	68	38	+30	43	
5	Sandefjord 2	24	11	4	9	94	59	+35	37	
6	Herkules	24	11	2	11	48	61	−13	35	
7	Notodden 2	24	10	2	12	65	70	−5	32	
8	Odd Grenland 3	24	10	2	12	54	62	−8	32	
9	Larvik Turn	23	9	2	12	65	62	+3	29	
10	Tollnes	24	8	4	12	60	86	−26	28	
11	Pors Grenland 2	24	8	0	16	39	74	−35	24	
12	Urædd (R)	24	7	1	16	39	89	−50	22	Relegation to 4. divisjon
13	Skade (R)	24	1	1	22	22	137	−115	4	Relegation to 4. divisjon
–	Tønsberg (Note: Withdrew?) (R)	0	0	0	0	0	0	0	0	Relegation to 4. divisjon

Source: speaker.no
Rules for classification: 1) points; 2) goal difference; 3) number of goals scored.
(P) Promoted; (R) Relegated

=== Group 6 ===
Pos	Team	Pld	W	D	L	GF	GA	GD	Pts	Promotion or relegation
1	Start 2 (Note: Start 2 were not promoted since IK Start was relegated to the First Division.)	26	20	4	2	80	29	+51	64	
2	Egersund (P)	26	15	9	2	83	23	+60	54	Promotion to 2. divisjon
3	Klepp (Note: Klepp were docked six points for using illegal players in 2010.)	26	18	4	4	88	41	+47	52	
4	Brodd	26	12	6	8	60	46	+14	42	
5	Stavanger	23	11	8	4	49	42	+7	41	
6	Bryne 2	26	12	4	10	75	100	−25	40	
7	Sandnes Ulf 2	26	12	1	13	67	81	−14	37	
8	Sola	26	10	5	11	50	58	−8	35	
9	Vardeneset	26	9	7	10	59	66	−7	34	
10	Hinna	26	9	3	14	49	76	−27	30	
11	Flekkefjord	26	7	4	15	40	61	−21	25	
12	Rosseland (R)	26	7	3	16	45	77	−32	24	Relegation to 4. divisjon
13	Lyngdal (R)	26	5	3	18	32	67	−35	18	Relegation to 4. divisjon
14	Søgne (R)	26	3	3	20	38	105	−67	12	Relegation to 4. divisjon

Source: speaker.no
Rules for classification: 1) points; 2) goal difference; 3) number of goals scored.
(P) Promoted; (R) Relegated

=== Group 7 ===
Pos	Team	Pld	W	D	L	GF	GA	GD	Pts	Promotion or relegation
1	Brann 2 (P)	26	22	0	4	104	29	+75	66	Promotion to 2. divisjon
2	Fyllingen (Note: Løv-Ham and Fyllingen merged to FK Fyllingsdalen after the 2011 season.)	26	20	4	2	90	24	+66	64	
3	Staal Jørpeland	26	20	3	3	76	24	+52	63	
4	Stord	26	13	4	9	60	56	+4	43	
5	Kopervik	26	13	2	11	61	51	+10	41	
6	Øystese	26	11	4	11	56	52	+4	37	
7	Os	26	11	2	13	55	53	+2	35	
8	Åkra	26	10	4	12	46	46	0	34	
9	Haugesund 2	26	9	4	13	52	66	−14	31	
10	Sotra	26	8	5	13	58	69	−11	29	
11	Skjold	26	8	4	14	47	79	−32	28	
12	Valestrand Hjellvik (R)	26	6	4	16	34	71	−37	22	Relegation to 4. divisjon
13	Askøy (R)	26	5	3	18	40	89	−49	18	Relegation to 4. divisjon
14	Djerv 1919 (R)	26	3	3	20	25	95	−70	12	Relegation to 4. divisjon

Source: speaker.no
Rules for classification: 1) points; 2) goal difference; 3) number of goals scored.
(P) Promoted; (R) Relegated

=== Group 8 ===
Pos	Team	Pld	W	D	L	GF	GA	GD	Pts	Promotion or relegation
1	Fana (P)	26	18	5	3	79	30	+49	59	Promotion to 2. divisjon
2	Bjarg	26	14	3	9	60	40	+20	45	
3	Voss	26	13	5	8	56	36	+20	44	
4	Årdal	26	13	5	8	44	37	+7	44	
5	Tornado Måløy	26	13	4	9	51	47	+4	43	
6	Arna-Bjørnar	26	12	4	10	52	41	+11	40	
7	Tertnes	26	12	3	11	38	51	−13	39	
8	Stryn	26	12	1	13	47	49	−2	37	
9	Eid	26	10	6	10	68	55	+13	36	
10	Løv-Ham 2 (Note: Løv-Ham and Fyllingen merged to FK Fyllingsdalen after the 2011 season.)	26	10	5	11	60	59	+1	35	
11	Florø	26	10	3	13	51	49	+2	33	
12	Saga (Note: Saga avoided relegation because of the merge)	26	10	2	14	32	60	−28	32	
13	Fjøra (R)	26	10	1	15	53	59	−6	31	Relegation to 4. divisjon
14	Åsane 2 (R)	16	1	1	14	23	101	−78	4	Relegation to 4. divisjon

Source: Speaker.no
Rules for classification: 1) points; 2) goal difference; 3) number of goals scored.
(P) Promoted; (R) Relegated

=== Group 9 ===
Pos	Team	Pld	W	D	L	GF	GA	GD	Pts	Promotion or relegation
1	Træff (P)	36	17	2	17	86	28	+58	53	Promotion to 2. divisjon
2	Skarbøvik	26	16	5	5	74	27	+47	53	
3	Sunndal (Note: Sunndal were docked two points for using illegal players.)	26	16	5	5	83	39	+44	51	
4	Elnesvågen	26	15	1	10	56	45	+11	46	
5	Hødd 2	26	13	5	8	78	55	+23	44	
6	Bergsøy	26	12	4	10	53	46	+7	40	
7	Stranda	26	11	4	11	45	56	−11	37	
8	Surnadal	26	10	4	12	38	50	−12	34	
9	Volda	26	10	3	13	52	49	+3	33	
10	Brattvåg	26	10	3	13	47	66	−19	33	
11	Averøykameratene	26	8	7	11	40	39	+1	31	
12	Larsnes/Gursken (Note: Larsnes/Gursken avoided relegation as the second best 12th placed team.)	26	8	7	11	50	56	−6	31	
13	Midsund (R)	26	8	4	14	61	80	−19	28	Relegation to 4. divisjon
14	Eidsvåg (R)	26	1	0	25	16	107	−91	3	Relegation to 4. divisjon

Source: speaker.no
Rules for classification: 1) points; 2) goal difference; 3) number of goals scored.
(P) Promoted; (R) Relegated

=== Group 10 ===
Pos	Team	Pld	W	D	L	GF	GA	GD	Pts	Promotion or relegation
1	Buvik (P)	26	20	0	6	88	48	+40	60	Promotion to 2. divisjon
2	Stjørdals/Blink	26	17	4	5	103	37	+66	55	
3	Verdal	26	16	5	5	59	25	+34	53	
4	KIL/Hemne	26	15	3	8	63	36	+27	48	
5	Frøya	26	13	6	7	60	37	+23	45	
6	Kolstad	26	12	2	12	50	50	0	38	
7	Charlottenlund	26	11	3	12	55	59	−4	36	
8	Rosenborg 3	26	11	2	13	52	62	−10	35	
9	Kvik	26	10	4	12	47	65	−18	34	
10	Alvdal	26	8	2	16	49	75	−26	26	
11	NTNUI	26	7	4	15	44	68	−24	25	
12	Strindheim 2 (R)	26	7	4	15	38	62	−24	25	Relegation to 4. divisjon
13	Namsos (R)	26	7	4	15	47	83	−36	25	Relegation to 4. divisjon
14	Vuku (R)	26	5	3	18	25	73	−48	18	Relegation to 4. divisjon

Source: speaker.no
Rules for classification: 1) points; 2) goal difference; 3) number of goals scored.
(P) Promoted; (R) Relegated

=== Group 11 ===
Pos	Team	Pld	W	D	L	GF	GA	GD	Pts	Promotion or relegation
1	Mo (P)	22	17	3	2	79	22	+57	54	Promotion to 2. divisjon
2	Sortland	22	14	4	4	77	37	+40	46	
3	Mosjøen	22	13	7	2	45	23	+22	46	
4	Sandnessjøen	22	13	4	5	61	37	+24	43	
5	Bodø/Glimt 2	22	12	6	4	69	27	+42	42	
6	Lofoten	22	11	3	8	64	45	+19	36	
7	Stålkameratene	22	6	4	12	32	52	−20	22	
8	Innstranden	22	6	3	13	33	67	−34	21	
9	Fauske/Sprint (Note: Fauske/Sprint was relegated in 2010, but since Morild withdrew before the season started, Fauske/Sprint was offered their spot.)	22	5	5	12	37	67	−30	20	
10	Harstad 2 (Note: Landsås avoids relegation since Harstad 2 is relegated to the Fourth Division because their Harstad are relegated from Second Division) (R)	22	5	2	15	41	71	−30	17	Relegation to 4. divisjon
11	Landsås	22	4	3	15	30	69	−39	15	
12	Junkeren (R)	22	3	2	17	22	73	−51	11	Relegation to 4. divisjon

Source: Speaker.no
Rules for classification: 1) points; 2) goal difference; 3) number of goals scored.
(P) Promoted; (R) Relegated

=== Group 12 ===
Pos	Team	Pld	W	D	L	GF	GA	GD	Pts	Promotion or relegation
1	Finnsnes (P)	22	18	1	3	86	21	+65	55	Promotion to 2. divisjon
2	Lyngen/Karnes	22	17	2	3	94	36	+58	53	
3	Norild	22	13	3	6	57	52	+5	42	
4	Bossekop	22	12	2	8	67	41	+26	38	
5	Fløya	22	11	2	9	62	58	+4	35	
6	Kirkenes	22	11	1	10	55	47	+8	34	
7	Hammerfest	22	9	3	10	42	45	−3	30	
8	Salangen	22	8	4	10	55	46	+9	28	
9	Porsanger	22	8	1	13	50	68	−18	25	
10	Ishavsbyen	22	5	4	13	46	84	−38	19	
11	Nordkjosbotn (R)	22	5	3	14	38	104	−66	18	Relegation to 4. divisjon
12	Tromsdalen 2 (R)	22	1	2	19	22	72	−50	5	Relegation to 4. divisjon

Source: Speaker.no
Rules for classification: 1) points; 2) goal difference; 3) number of goals scored.
(P) Promoted; (R) Relegated
