= 2015 Norwegian Third Division =

3. divisjon
- Season: 2015

The 2015 season of the 3. divisjon, the fourth highest association football league for men in Norway.

Between 22 and 26 games (depending on group size) are played in 12 groups, with 3 points given for wins and 1 for draws. Twelve group winners are promoted to the 2. divisjon.

== Tables ==
Group 1

1. Oppsal – promoted
2. Kråkerøy
3. Follo 2
4. Sarpsborg 08 2
5. Trosvik
6. Grorud 2
7. Østsiden
8. Drøbak/Frogn
9. Fredrikstad 2
10. Ås
11. Skeid 2
12. Borgar – relegated
13. Nesodden – relegated
14. Selbak – relegated

Group 2

1. Asker – promoted
2. Funnefoss/Vormsund
3. Skedsmo
4. Hauerseter
5. Skjetten
6. Strømmen 2
7. Lokomotiv Oslo
8. Ottestad
9. Kongsvinger 2
10. Ham-Kam 2
11. Ull/Kisa IL 2
12. Gjerdrum – relegated
13. Rælingen – relegated
14. Grue – relegated

Group 3

1. Frigg – promoted
2. Røa
3. Ready
4. Korsvoll
5. Valdres
6. Grei
7. Hallingdal
8. Jevnaker
9. Nordstrand
10. Hasle-Løren
11. Oslo City
12. Oldenborg – relegated
13. Skårer – relegated
14. Lyn 2 – relegated

Group 4

1. Tønsberg – promoted
2. Lommedalen
3. Sandefjord 2
4. Mjøndalen 2
5. Vestfossen
6. Strømsgodset 3
7. Åssiden
8. Bærum 2
9. Larvik Turn – pulled team
10. Eik-Tønsberg
11. Skarphedin
12. Modum – relegated
13. Fagerborg – relegated
14. Birkebeineren – relegated

Group 5

1. Pors – promoted
2. Frøyland
3. Ålgård
4. Start 2
5. Sandnes Ulf 2
6. Randesund
7. Bryne 2
8. Mandalskameratene
9. Vigør
10. Odd 3
11. Express
12. Tollnes – relegated
13. Lyngdal – relegated
14. Hei – relegated

Group 6

1. Stord – promoted
2. Haugesund 2
3. Viking 2
4. Os
5. Riska
6. Åkra
7. Vardeneset
8. Randaberg
9. Staal
10. Vard 2
11. Brodd
12. Madla
13. Vaulen – relegated
14. Kopervik – relegated

Group 7

1. Lysekloster – promoted
2. Sotra
3. Varegg
4. Brann 2
5. Øystese
6. Lyngbø
7. Austevoll
8. Arna-Bjørnar
9. Bjarg
10. Tertnes
11. Nest-Sotra 2
12. Vadmyra – relegated
13. Loddefjord – relegated
14. Fyllingsdalen 2 – relegated

Group 8

1. Brattvåg – promoted
2. Kristiansund FK
3. Herd
4. Sogndal 2
5. Spjelkavik
6. Stryn
7. Volda
8. Årdal
9. Hødd 2
10. Bergsøy
11. Florø 2
12. Kristiansund 2 – relegated
13. Eid – relegated
14. Skarbøvik – relegated

Group 9

1. Tynset – promoted
2. Orkla
3. Lillehammer
4. Flisa
5. KIL/Hemne
6. Ranheim 2
7. Raufoss 2
8. Faaberg
9. Buvik
10. Gjøvik-Lyn 2
11. Alvdal
12. Kolbu/KK – relegated
13. Moelven – relegated
14. Kvik – relegated

Group 10

1. Rosenborg 2 – promoted
2. Kolstad
3. Steinkjer
4. Verdal
5. Sverresborg
6. NTNUI
7. Charlottenlund
8. Byåsen 2
9. Strindheim 2
10. Heimdal
11. Namsos
12. Neset – relegated
13. Nardo – relegated
14. Åfjord – relegated

Group 11

1. Mo – promoted
2. Bodø/Glimt 2
3. Stålkameratene
4. Melbo
5. Sandnessjøen
6. Sortland
7. Junkeren
8. Mosjøen
9. Fauske/Sprint
10. Medkila
11. Grand Bodø – relegated
12. Tverlandet – relegated

Group 12

1. Tromsø 2 – promoted
2. Kirkenes
3. Fløya
4. Skarp
5. Bjørnevatn
6. Skjervøy
7. Ishavsbyen
8. Alta 2
9. Hammerfest
10. Salangen
11. Bossekop – relegated
12. Porsanger – relegated
