= 2012 Norwegian Third Division =

3. divisjon
- Season: 2012

The 2012 season of the 3. divisjon, the fourth highest association football league for men in Norway.

Between 22 and 26 games (depending on group size) are played in 12 groups, with 3 points given for wins and 1 for draws. Twelve group winners are promoted to the 2. divisjon.

The 3. divisjon was streamlined to only 12 groups, compared to 24 groups in 2010.

== Tables ==
Group 1

1. Drøbak/Frogn – promoted
2. Sprint-Jeløy
3. Sarpsborg 08 2
4. Korsvoll
5. Hasle-Løren
6. Fredrikstad 2
7. Askim
8. Oslo City
9. Skeid 2 – relegated
10. Follo 2
11. Nesodden 2
12. Nordstrand – relegated
13. Holmlia
14. Trosvik – relegated

Group 2

1. Skedsmo – promoted
2. Lillestrøm 2
3. Ull/Kisa IL 2
4. Frognerparken – pulled team post-season
5. Jevnaker
6. Hønefoss 2
7. Strømmen 2
8. Lørenskog 2
9. Bøler
10. Eidskog – pulled team post-season
11. Fjellhamar
12. Sparta/Bragerøen – gave way for Stoppen
13. Vestfossen – relegated
14. Grüner – relegated

Group 3

1. Lyn – promoted
2. Modum
3. Ullern
4. Mjøndalen 2
5. Drammen
6. Nordre Land
7. Raufoss 2
8. Asker 2
9. Lommedalen
10. Bærum 2
11. Romsås
12. Røa – relegated
13. Vestli – relegated:
  Frigg 2 – pulled team

Group 4

1. Eidsvold Turn – promoted
2. Stjørdals-Blink
3. Ottestad
4. Tiller
5. Flisa
6. Sander
7. Hauerseter
8. Ham-Kam 2
9. Alvdal
10. Kongsvinger 2
11. Funnefoss/Vormsund
12. Brumunddal 2 – relegated
13. Moelven – relegated:
  Nybergsund 2 – pulled team

Group 5

1. Arendal – promoted
2. Skarphedin
3. Herkules
4. Notodden 2
5. Sandefjord 2
6. Pors 2
7. Runar
8. Larvik Turn
9. Tollnes
10. Flint
11. Odd 3
12. Eik-Tønsberg – relegated
13. Kongsberg – relegated
14. Skotfoss – relegated

Group 6

1. Viking 2 – promoted
2. Staal
3. Start 2
4. Vigør
5. Bryne 2
6. Brodd
7. Frøyland
8. Donn
9. Vardeneset
10. Klepp
11. Flekkefjord
12. Madla – relegated
13. Sola – relegated
14. Hinna – relegated

Group 7

1. Arna-Bjørnar – promoted
2. Haugesund 2
3. Stord
4. Os
5. Åkra
6. Varegg
7. Sandnes Ulf 2
8. Bjarg
9. Austevoll
10. Tertnes
11. Kopervik
12. Stavanger – relegated
13. Avaldsnes – relegated
14. Skjold – relegated

Group 8

1. Førde – promoted
2. Florø
3. Fyllingsdalen 2
4. Voss
5. Øystese
6. Årdal
7. Sotra
8. Stryn
9. Vik
10. Tornado Måløy
11. Radøy/Manger
12. Saga – relegated
13. Eid – relegated
14. Bergen Nord – relegated

Group 9

1. Skarbøvik – promoted
2. Sunndal
3. Brattvåg
4. Herd
5. Bergsøy
6. Hødd 2
7. Averøykameratene
8. Elnesvågen/Omegn
9. Stranda
10. Larsnes/Gursken
11. Volda
12. Surnadal
13. Dahle – relegated
14. Hareid – relegated

Group 10

1. Strindheim – promoted
2. Tynset
3. Verdal
4. KIL/Hemne
5. Steinkjer
6. NTNUI
7. Rosenborg 3
8. Kolstad
9. Kvik – pulled team post-season
10. Charlottenlund
11. Ranheim 2
12. Tangmoen
13. Frøya – relegated
14. Åfjord – relegated

Group 11

1. Bodø/Glimt 2
2. Harstad – promoted
3. Sortland
4. Sandnessjøen
5. Mjølner 2 – relegated
6. Stålkameratene
7. Lofoten
8. Mosjøen
9. Tverlandet
10. Innstranden
11. Junkeren
12. Fauske/Sprint – relegated

Group 12

- Bossekop – promoted
- Fløya
- Lyngen/Karnes
- Kirkenes
- Hammerfest
- Porsanger
- Skarp
- Norild
- Tverrelvdalen
- Ishavsbyen
- Nordreisa – relegated
- Salangen – relegated
