= 2016 Norwegian Third Division =

3. divisjon
- Season: 2016

The 2016 season of the 3. divisjon, the fourth highest association football league for men in Norway.

Between 22 and 26 games (depending on group size) were played in 12 groups, with 3 points given for wins and 1 for draws. No group winners were promoted to the 2. divisjon; instead the number of teams in the 3. divisjon was harshly reduced to make it a new tier of regional groups. Up to 9 teams from groups of 12 were relegated, making the 2017 4. divisjon the new highest tier of locally constituted groups.

On 19 September 2016, Erling Haaland became the youngest hat-trick scorer in the history of Norwegian football after scoring a hat-trick in Bryne's away 5–3 win over Haugesund 2 in the Group 6, at the age of 16 years and 2 months.

== Teams ==
Group 1
Pos	Team
1	Kråkerøy
2	Sarpsborg 08 2
3	Østsiden
4	Sprint-Jeløy
5	Drøbak/Frogn
6	Nordstrand (R)
7	Fredrikstad 2 (R)
8	Ås (R)
9	Sarpsborg (R)
10	Oslojuvelene (R)
11	Trosvik (R)
12	Follo 2 (R)
13	Sparta Sarpsborg (R)
14	Røa (R)

(R) Relegation to Fourth Division

Group 2
Pos	Team
1	Lyn
2	Skjetten
3	Korsvoll
4	Lokomotiv Oslo
5	Kjelsås 2 (R)
6	Rilindja (R)
7	Grorud 2 (R)
8	Grei (R)
9	Lommedalen (R)
10	Strømmen 2 (R)
11	Lørenskog 2 (R)
12	Manglerud Star (R)
13	Skeid 2 (R)
14	Hasle-Løren (R)

(R) Relegation to Fourth Division

Group 3
Pos	Team
1	Skedsmo
2	Flisa
3	Funnefoss/Vormsund
4	Lillestrøm 2
5	Valdres
6	Hauerseter (R)
7	Aurskog-Høland (R)
8	Årdal (R)
9	Gran (R)
10	Kongsvinger 2 (R)
11	Ull/Kisa IL 2 (R)
12	Jevnaker (R)
13	Hallingdal (R)
14	Sander (R)

(R) Relegation to Fourth Division

Group 4
Pos	Team
1	Vestfossen
2	Odd 3
3	Strømsgodset 3 (R)
4	Ready
5	Holmen
6	Halsen
7	Mjøndalen 2 (R)
8	Åssiden (R)
9	Eik-Tønsberg (R)
10	Bærum 2 (R)
11	Kongsberg (R)
12	Asker 2 (R)
13	Svelvik (R)
14	Drammen (R)

(R) Relegation to Fourth Division

Group 5
Pos	Team
1	Viking 2
2	Madla
3	Express
4	Start 2
5	Lura
6	Eiger (R)
7	Jerv 2 (R)
8	Mandalskameratene (R)
9	Vigør (R)
10	Skarphedin (R)
11	Notodden 2 (R)
12	Donn (R)
13	Randesund (R)
–	Sandefjord 2 (E)

(E) Expelled; (R) Relegation to Fourth Division

Group 6
Pos	Team
1	Staal
2	Bryne 2
3	Sandnes Ulf 2
4	Brodd
5	Haugesund 2
6	Ålgård (R)
7	Åkra (R)
8	Vardeneset (R)
9	Randaberg (R)
10	Riska (R)
11	Frøyland (R)
12	Vard 2 (R)
13	Odda (R)
14	Hinna (R)

(R) Relegation to Fourth Division

Group 7
Pos	Team
1	Brann 2
2	Sotra
3	Varegg
4	Os
5	Bjarg (R)
6	Åsane 2 (R)
7	Austevoll (R)
8	Arna-Bjørnar (R)
9	Lyngbø (R)
10	Tertnes (R)
11	Gneist (R)
12	Vestsiden-Askøy (R)
13	Øystese (R)
–	Nest-Sotra 2 (E)

(E) Expelled; (R) Relegation to Fourth Division

Group 8
Pos	Team
1	Herd
2	Spjelkavik
3	Træff
4	Aalesund 2
5	Fjøra
6	Hødd 2 (R)
7	Volda (R)
8	Bergsøy (R)
9	Kristiansund FK (R)
10	Stryn (R)
11	Sogndal 2 (R)
12	Florø 2 (R)
13	Rollon (R)
14	Surnadal (R)

(R) Relegation to Fourth Division

Group 9
Pos	Team
1	Eidsvold Turn
2	Redalen
3	Lillehammer
4	Raufoss 2
5	Sverresborg
6	Trygg/Lade (R)
7	Strindheim 2 (R)
8	Heimdal (R)
9	Faaberg (R)
10	Ham-Kam 2 (R)
11	Gjøvik-Lyn 2 (R)
12	Ottestad (R)
13	Kattem (R)
14	Alvdal (R)

(R) Relegation to Fourth Division

Group 10
Pos	Team
1	Kolstad
2	Orkla
3	Steinkjer
4	Verdal
5	Tillerbyen
6	KIL/Hemne (R)
7	Charlottenlund (R)
8	Stjørdals-Blink 2 (R)
9	Ranheim 2 (R)
10	Byåsen 2 (R)
11	NTNUI (R)
12	Rørvik (R)
13	Namsos (R)
14	Buvik (R)

(R) Relegation to Fourth Division

Group 11
Pos	Team	Pld	W	D	L	GF	GA	GD	Pts	Relegation
1	Sortland	22	13	5	4	47	23	+24	44	
2	Junkeren	22	13	5	4	49	36	+13	44	
3	Mosjøen	22	12	6	4	64	39	+25	42	
4	Mjølner	22	12	6	4	54	31	+23	42	
5	Bodø/Glimt 2 (R)	22	11	3	8	57	41	+16	36	Relegation to Fourth Division
6	Fauske/Sprint (R)	22	9	7	6	52	44	+8	34	Relegation to Fourth Division
7	Sandnessjøen (R)	22	9	3	10	43	42	+1	30	Relegation to Fourth Division
8	Melbo (R)	22	7	6	9	42	45	−3	27	Relegation to Fourth Division
9	Brønnøysund (R)	22	8	1	13	39	50	−11	25	Relegation to Fourth Division
10	Stålkameratene (R)	22	6	4	12	34	47	−13	22	Relegation to Fourth Division
11	Lofoten (R)	22	7	0	15	45	69	−24	21	Relegation to Fourth Division
12	Medkila (R)	22	1	2	19	21	80	−59	5	Relegation to Fourth Division

Updated to match(es) played on 28 October 2016. Source: nifs.no
Rules for classification: 1) points; 2) goal difference; 3) number of goals scored.
(R) Relegated

Group 12
Pos	Team	Pld	W	D	L	GF	GA	GD	Pts	Relegation
1	Fløya	22	18	2	2	82	23	+59	56	
2	Salangen	22	12	5	5	56	19	+37	41	
3	Alta 2	22	12	5	5	53	31	+22	41	
4	Skjervøy	22	12	5	5	53	33	+20	41	
5	Kirkenes (R)	22	12	3	7	46	33	+13	39	Relegation to Fourth Division
6	Skarp (R)	22	11	4	7	51	39	+12	37	Relegation to Fourth Division
7	Bjørnevatn (R)	22	8	6	8	40	38	+2	30	Relegation to Fourth Division
8	Bossekop (R)	22	9	2	11	42	57	−15	29	Relegation to Fourth Division
9	Tromsø 3 (R)	22	7	1	14	38	56	−18	22	Relegation to Fourth Division
10	Ishavsbyen (R)	22	5	4	13	42	78	−36	19	Relegation to Fourth Division
11	Hammerfest (R)	22	4	1	17	26	62	−36	13	Relegation to Fourth Division
12	Tverrelvdalen (R)	22	3	0	19	27	87	−60	9	Relegation to Fourth Division

Updated to match(es) played on 28 October 2016. Source: nifs.no
Rules for classification: 1) points; 2) goal difference; 3) number of goals scored.
(R) Relegated
