= Play-offs to the Norwegian Second Division =

Football competition

The Play-offs to the 2. divisjon in association football took place from 2000 up to and including the 2010 season.

The play-offs were instituted because of the streamlining of the 2. divisjon ahead of the 2001 season. It was reduced from eight to four groups, and thus, not all winners of the 3. divisjon groups could be promoted.

From the 2011 season, the 3. divisjon was streamlined to have twelve groups, where the winners are promoted to the four groups of the 2. divisjon, whence three teams (on average) in each of the four 2. divisjon groups are relegated to the 3. divisjon.

== 2010 ==
- Nesodden beat Korsvoll 3–2 on aggregate
- Hasle-Løren beat Lillestrøm 2 5–2 on aggregate
- Elverum beat Gjøvik 5–2 on aggregate
- Kvik Halden beat Eik Tønsberg 5–1 on aggregate
- Mandalskameratene beat Skarphedin 6–2 on aggregate
- Viking 2 beat Staal Jørpeland 5–4 on aggregate
- Austevoll beat Voss 5–3 on aggregate
- Jevnaker beat Tornado Måløy 5–1 on aggregate
- Herd beat Sunndal 8–2 on aggregate
- Tiller beat Stjørdals-Blink 6–4 on aggregate
- Mjølner beat Stålkameratene 8–2 on aggregate
- Skarp beat Kirkenes 7–4 on aggregate

Reference: Fotballen.eu

== 2009 ==
- Oslo City beat Høland 6–2 on aggregate
- Frigg beat Lommedalen 13–3 on aggregate
- Brumunddal beat Flisa 3–2 on aggregate
- Ørn-Horten beat Kvik Halden on the away goals rule; 3–3 on aggregate
- Odd 2 beat Jerv 9–3 on aggregate
- Vidar beat Viking 2 9–7 on aggregate (after extra time)
- Os beat Austevoll 4–3 on aggregate
- Førde beat Birkebeineren 5–3 on aggregate
- Aalesund 2 beat Træff 5–3 on aggregate
- Kolstad beat Charlottenlund 7–2 on aggregate
- Harstad beat Stålkameratene 3–2 on aggregate
- Senja beat Kirkenes 3–1 on aggregate

Reference: Fotballen.eu

== 2008 ==
- Ullern beat Oslo City 4–2 on aggregate
- KFUM Oslo beat Høland 5–2 on aggregate
- FF Lillehammer beat Flisa 3–2 on aggregate
- Fram Larvik beat Kvik Halden 4–1 on aggregate
- Åskollen beat Førde 8–3 on aggregate
- Start 2 beat Odd 2 9–4 on aggregate
- Kopervik beat Klepp 5–2 on aggregate
- Stord beat Brann 2 3–2 on aggregate
- Molde 2 beat Aalesund 2 3–0 on aggregate
- Nardo beat Tiller 4–2 on aggregate
- Bodø/Glimt 2 beat Harstad 6–5 on aggregate (after extra time)
- Bossekop beat Skjervøy 4–1 on aggregate

Reference: Fotballen.eu

== 2007 ==
- Lyn 2 beat Frigg 7–4 on aggregate
- Skjetten beat Grüner 14–0 on aggregate
- Valdres beat Ham-Kam 2 5–4 on aggregate
- Østsiden beat Fram Larvik 3–1 on aggregate
- Strømsgodset 2 beat Årdal 7–1 on aggregate
- Vindbjart beat Tollnes 9–2 on aggregate
- Randaberg beat Kopervik 7–2 on aggregate
- Nest-Sotra beat Trio 7–4 on aggregate
- Skarbøvik beat Træff 7–2 on aggregate
- KIL/Hemne beat Verdal 2–1 on aggregate
- Lofoten beat Innstranden 4–3 on aggregate
- Senja beat Kirkenes 9–3 on aggregate

Reference: Fotballen.eu

== 2006 ==
- Fredrikstad 2 beat Kvik Halden 3–2 on aggregate
- Strømmen beat Ullern 8–6 on aggregate
- Mjøndalen beat Elverum on the away goals rule, 4–4 on aggregate
- FF Lillehammer beat Stryn on the away goals rule, 1–1 on aggregate
- Asker beat Sandefjord 2 5–4 on aggregate
- FK Arendal beat Urædd 5–1 on aggregate
- Stavanger beat Vidar 6–1 on aggregate
- Os beat Hovding 4–3 on aggregate
- Averøykameratene beat Skarbøvik 5–4 on aggregate
- Nardo beat Verdal 3–1 on aggregate
- Mjølner beat Fauske/Sprint 4–2 on aggregate
- Tromsø 2 beat Porsanger 11–5 on aggregate

Reference: Fotballen.eu

== 2005 ==
- Vålerenga 2 beat Fredrikstad 2 7–4 on aggregate
- Korsvoll beat Elverum 4–3 on aggregate
- Åmot beat Asker 4–3 on aggregate
- Hamkam 2 beat Stryn 6–5 on aggregate
- Stabæk 2 beat Skarphedin 11–1 on aggregate
- Start 2 beat Eik-Tønsberg 4–3 on aggregate
- Kopervik beat Randaberg on the away goals rule; 2–2 on aggregate
- Askøy beat Voss 5–1 on aggregate
- Kristiansund beat Volda 4–2 on aggregate
- KIL/Hemne beat Nardo 3–1 on aggregate
- Steigen beat Mjølner 2–1 on aggregate
- Hammerfest beat Tromsø 2 6–3 on aggregate

== 2004 ==
- Brumunddal beat Strømmen 3–2 on aggregate
- Sarpsborg beat KFUM Oslo 3–0 on aggregate
- FF Lillehammer beat Førde 7–3 on aggregate
- Groruddalen beat Jevnaker 7–2 on aggregate
- Notodden beat Mjøndalen 5–1 on aggregate
- Flekkerøy beat Eik-Tønsberg 6–3 on aggregate
- Egersund beat Randaberg 4–2 on aggregate
- Stord/Moster beat Nest-Sotra 3–2 on aggregate
- Træff beat Skarbøvik 4–2 on aggregate
- Ranheim beat Stjørdals-Blink 7–5 on aggregate
- Innstranden beat Grovfjord 8–1 on aggregate
- Lyngen/Karnes beat Bossekop 4–3 on aggregate

== 2003 ==
- Sparta beat Notodden 8–1 on aggregate
- Drøbak/Frogn beat Groruddalen 1–0 on aggregate
- Elverum beat Jevnaker on the away goals rule; 3–3 on aggregate
- Jotun beat Brumunddal 2–1 on aggregate
- FK Arendal beat Eik-Tønsberg 3–1 on aggregate
- Donn beat Asker 5–4 on aggregate
- Sandnes beat Buøy 5–4 on aggregate
- Norheimsund beat Stord/Moster 4–3 on aggregate
- Volda beat Træff on penalties; 3–3 on aggregate
- Kolstad beat Orkla 6–3 on aggregate
- Harstad beat Innstranden 5–2 on aggregate
- Salangen beat Båtsfjord 6–2 on aggregate

== 2002 ==
- Mercantile beat Mjøndalen 6–1 on aggregate
- Borg Fotball beat Grei 7–1 on aggregate
- Lillestrøm 2 beat Brumunddal 12–1 on aggregate
- Gjøvik-Lyn beat Jotun 8–3 on aggregate
- Odd 2 beat Arendal 5–3 on aggregate
- Runar beat Sarpsborg 4–1 on aggregate
- Ålgård beat Vaulen 8–4 on aggregate
- Hovding beat Trott 7–0 on aggregate
- Averøykameratene beat Bergsøy 6–1 on aggregate
- Nidelv beat Nardo 5–2 on aggregate
- Narvik beat Steigen 6–1 on aggregate
- Bossekop beat Lyngen/Karnes 7–5 on aggregate

== 2001 ==
- Follo beat Lillestrøm 2 2–1 on aggregate
- Grindvoll beat Nittedal 5–2 on aggregate
- Frigg beat Moss 2 2–1 on aggregate
- Elverum beat Stryn 7–4 on aggregate
- Jerv beat Birkebeineren 4–2 on aggregate
- Larvik beat Vindbjart 3–2 on aggregate
- Klepp beat Vedavåg Karmøy 6–3 on aggregate
- Brann 2 beat Radøy on the away goals rule, 3–3 on aggregate
- Langevåg beat Dahle on the away goals rule, 5–5 on aggregate
- Levanger beat Nidelv 3–2 on aggregate
- Vesterålen beat Innstranden 6–4 on aggregate
- Salangen beat Porsanger 5–2 on aggregate

Reference: Speaker.no

== 2000 ==
In 2000, there was a three-way playoff between teams from both the 2. divisjon and the 3. divisjon. One team prevailed (with green background in the table), the other two were either relegated or stayed in the 3. divisjon. All the three-way matches, with one exception, were contested between one 2. divisjon and two 3. divisjon teams.

2. divisjon team	3. divisjon team	3. divisjon team
Lyngen/Karnes	Fløya	Hammerfest
Fauske/Sprint	Gevir Bodø	Flakstad
Grovfjord	Nidelv	Stjørdals-Blink
Træff	Langevåg	Kristiansund
Kolstad	Nest-Sotra	Brann 2
Sandnes	Jerv	Ålgård
Gjøvik-Lyn	Sparta	Mjøndalen
Eidsvold Turn	Østsiden	Runar
Ski	Rygge	Nybergsund
Nord	Os (2. divisjon)	Sogndal 2

- Reference: RSSSF
