= 2014 in Norwegian football =

Football in Norway
- Season: 2014

Men's football
- Tippeligaen: Molde
- 1. divisjon: Sandefjord
- 2. divisjon: Jerv (Group 1); Levanger (Group 2); Åsane (Group 3); Follo (Group 4)
- Cupen: Molde

Women's football
- Toppserien: LSK Kvinner
- 1. divisjon: Sandviken
- Cupen: LSK Kvinner

The 2014 in Norwegian football season was the 109th edition of competitive football in Norway.

The season began in March and ended in November with the 2014 Norwegian Football Cup Final.

== Men's football ==
=== League season ===
==== Tippeligaen ====
Pos	Team	Pld	W	D	L	GF	GA	GD	Pts	Qualification or relegation
1	Molde (C)	30	22	5	3	62	24	+38	71	Qualification for the Champions League second qualifying round
2	Rosenborg	30	18	6	6	64	43	+21	60	Qualification for the Europa League first qualifying round (Note: Since the winners of the 2014 Norwegian Cup (Molde) qualified for European competition based on their league position, the berth (Europa League first qualifying round) was passed down the league to Strømsgodset.)
3	Odd	30	17	7	6	52	32	+20	58	Qualification for the Europa League first qualifying round
4	Strømsgodset	30	15	5	10	48	42	+6	50	Qualification for the Europa League first qualifying round
5	Lillestrøm	30	13	7	10	49	35	+14	46	
6	Vålerenga	30	11	9	10	59	53	+6	42	
7	Aalesund	30	11	8	11	40	39	+1	41	
8	Sarpsborg 08	30	10	10	10	41	48	−7	40	
9	Stabæk	30	11	6	13	44	52	−8	39	
10	Viking	30	8	12	10	42	42	0	36	
11	Haugesund	30	10	6	14	43	49	−6	36	
12	Start	30	10	5	15	47	60	−13	35	
13	Bodø/Glimt	30	10	5	15	45	60	−15	35	
14	Brann (R)	30	8	5	17	41	54	−13	29	Qualification for the relegation play-offs
15	Sogndal (R)	30	6	6	18	31	49	−18	24	Relegation to First Division
16	Sandnes Ulf (R)	30	4	10	16	27	53	−26	22	Relegation to First Division

Source: fotball.no
Rules for classification: 1) points; 2) goal difference; 3) number of goals scored.
(C) Champions; (R) Relegated

==== 1. divisjon ====
Pos	Team	Pld	W	D	L	GF	GA	GD	Pts	Promotion, qualification or relegation
1	Sandefjord (C, P)	30	20	9	1	62	24	+38	69	Promotion to Tippeligaen
2	Tromsø (P)	30	18	5	7	67	27	+40	59	Promotion to Tippeligaen
3	Mjøndalen (O, P)	30	14	9	7	57	36	+21	51	Qualification for the promotion play-offs
4	Kristiansund BK	30	13	10	7	53	39	+14	49	Qualification for the promotion play-offs
5	Bærum	30	15	4	11	51	52	−1	49	Qualification for the promotion play-offs
6	Fredrikstad	30	14	6	10	35	26	+9	48	Qualification for the promotion play-offs
7	Ranheim	30	13	7	10	45	34	+11	46	
8	Hødd	30	12	7	11	48	49	−1	43	
9	Bryne	30	13	3	14	48	55	−7	42	
10	Strømmen	30	11	8	11	59	54	+5	41	
11	Hønefoss	30	12	4	14	39	55	−16	40	
12	Nest-Sotra	30	10	7	13	49	51	−2	37	
13	Alta (R)	30	9	7	14	33	51	−18	34	Relegation to Second Division
14	Tromsdalen (R)	30	8	7	15	44	56	−12	31	Relegation to Second Division
15	Ullensaker/Kisa (R)	30	6	5	19	26	51	−25	23	Relegation to Second Division
16	HamKam (R)	30	1	4	25	22	78	−56	7	Relegation to Second Division

Source: nifs.no
Rules for classification: 1) points; 2) goal difference; 3) number of goals scored.
(C) Champions; (O) Play-off winners; (P) Promoted; (R) Relegated

==== 2. divisjon ====
===== Group 1 =====
Pos	Team	Pld	W	D	L	GF	GA	GD	Pts	Promotion or relegation
1	Jerv (P)	26	17	6	3	71	29	+42	57	Promotion to First Division
2	Vindbjart	26	16	3	7	71	44	+27	51	
3	Fram Larvik	26	15	4	7	52	41	+11	49	
4	Kongsvinger	26	15	3	8	61	42	+19	48	
5	Notodden	26	15	3	8	50	42	+8	48	
6	Flekkerøy	26	11	7	8	56	45	+11	40	
7	Odd 2	26	10	7	9	65	53	+12	37	
8	Arendal	26	10	4	12	47	58	−11	34	
9	Holmen	26	8	8	10	46	72	−26	32	
10	Ørn-Horten	26	10	1	15	50	57	−7	31	
11	Strømsgodset	26	8	5	13	61	68	−7	29	
12	Pors Grenland (R)	26	7	5	14	43	50	−7	26	Relegation to Third Division
13	Asker (R)	26	5	6	15	36	50	−14	21	Relegation to Third Division
14	Birkebeineren (R)	26	2	4	20	34	82	−48	10	Relegation to Third Division

Source: nifs.no
Rules for classification: 1) points; 2) goal difference; 3) number of goals scored.
(P) Promoted; (R) Relegated

===== Group 2 =====
Pos	Team	Pld	W	D	L	GF	GA	GD	Pts	Promotion or relegation
1	Levanger (P)	26	16	6	4	64	29	+35	54	Promotion to First Division
2	Byåsen	26	16	5	5	64	40	+24	53	
3	Elverum	26	15	7	4	55	27	+28	52	
4	Raufoss	26	15	5	6	64	43	+21	50	
5	Nybergsund-Trysil	26	11	8	7	47	35	+12	41	
6	Gjøvik-Lyn	26	11	8	7	39	28	+11	41	
7	Nardo	26	10	8	8	41	42	−1	38	
8	Rødde	26	9	6	11	44	54	−10	33	
9	Brumunddal	26	8	6	12	33	38	−5	30	
10	Træff	26	7	7	12	36	43	−7	28	
11	Molde 2	26	7	5	14	40	64	−24	26	
12	Herd (R)	26	6	4	16	28	56	−28	22	Relegation to Third Division
13	Rosenborg 2 (R)	26	4	7	15	40	56	−16	19	Relegation to Third Division
14	Valders (R)	26	4	4	18	34	74	−40	16	Relegation to Third Division

Source: nifs.no
Rules for classification: 1) points; 2) goal difference; 3) number of goals scored.
(P) Promoted; (R) Relegated

===== Group 3 =====
Pos	Team	Pld	W	D	L	GF	GA	GD	Pts	Promotion or relegation
1	Åsane (P)	26	17	4	5	70	27	+43	55	Promotion to First Division
2	Egersund	26	14	6	6	48	36	+12	48	
3	Vard Haugesund	26	12	5	9	57	38	+19	41	
4	Vidar	26	11	7	8	48	40	+8	40	
5	Førde	26	10	9	7	40	42	−2	39	
6	Florø	26	9	10	7	53	49	+4	37	
7	Grorud	26	9	8	9	49	51	−2	35	
8	Stabæk 2	26	11	1	14	47	57	−10	34	
9	Fana	26	9	6	11	51	56	−5	33	
10	Lyn	26	9	5	12	42	42	0	32	
11	Fyllingsdalen	26	9	5	12	47	50	−3	32	
12	Brann 2 (R)	26	10	2	14	50	64	−14	32	Relegation to Third Division
13	Stord (R)	26	7	6	13	43	62	−19	27	Relegation to Third Division
14	Ålgård (R)	26	7	2	17	32	63	−31	23	Relegation to Third Division

Source: nifs.no
Rules for classification: 1) points; 2) goal difference; 3) number of goals scored.
(P) Promoted; (R) Relegated

===== Group 4 =====
Pos	Team	Pld	W	D	L	GF	GA	GD	Pts	Promotion or relegation
1	Follo (P)	26	21	3	2	97	16	+81	66	Promotion to First Division
2	Kjelsås	26	18	4	4	74	28	+46	58	
3	Moss	26	16	5	5	69	24	+45	53	
4	Eidsvold TF	26	13	6	7	59	34	+25	45	
5	KFUM Oslo	26	13	6	7	44	31	+13	45	
6	Finnsnes	26	14	1	11	45	41	+4	43	
7	Skeid	26	13	3	10	54	41	+13	42	
8	Harstad	26	12	3	11	46	33	+13	39	
9	Vålerenga 2	26	10	6	10	51	51	0	36	
10	Kvik Halden	26	9	4	13	37	51	−14	31	
11	Lørenskog	26	7	5	14	36	64	−28	26	
12	Drøbak-Frogn (R)	26	4	3	19	37	92	−55	15	Relegation to Third Division
13	Mo (R)	26	3	4	19	22	87	−65	13	Relegation to Third Division
14	Medkila (R)	26	2	1	23	13	91	−78	7	Relegation to Third Division

Source: nifs.no
Rules for classification: 1) points; 2) goal difference; 3) number of goals scored.
(P) Promoted; (R) Relegated

=== Norwegian Cup ===
==== Final ====
23 November 2014
13:15 CET (UTC+1)

Odd	0–2	Molde
	Report	Gulbrandsen 73'; Elyounoussi 89'

Ullevaal Stadion, Oslo
Attendance: 26,582
Referee: Dag Vidar Hafsås (Kolstad)

== Women's football ==
=== League season ===
==== Toppserien ====
Pos	Team	Pld	W	D	L	GF	GA	GD	Pts	Qualification or relegation
1	LSK Kvinner (C)	22	18	3	1	64	14	+50	57	Qualification for the Champions League round of 32
2	Stabæk	22	16	4	2	62	19	+43	52	
3	Arna-Bjørnar	22	14	0	8	58	21	+37	42	
4	Kolbotn	22	13	0	9	41	32	+9	39	
5	Avaldsnes	22	12	2	8	56	27	+29	38	
6	Røa	22	9	5	8	36	27	+9	32	
7	Vålerenga	22	9	3	10	27	45	−18	30	
8	Trondheims-Ørn	22	7	6	9	33	37	−4	27	
9	Klepp	22	8	2	12	32	45	−13	26	
10	Medkila	22	4	3	15	18	62	−44	15	
11	Amazon Grimstad (O)	22	4	2	16	18	60	−42	14	Qualification for the relegation play-offs
12	Grand Bodø (R)	22	1	4	17	15	71	−56	7	Relegation to First Division

Source: NIFS
Rules for classification: 1) points; 2) goal difference; 3) number of goals scored.
(C) Champions; (O) Play-off winners; (R) Relegated

=== Norwegian Women's Cup ===
==== Final ====
- LSK Kvinner 3–1 Trondheims-Ørn

== Men's UEFA competitions ==
=== Champions League ===
==== Qualifying phase ====
===== Second qualifying round =====
Team 1	Agg.	Team 2	1st leg	2nd leg
Strømsgodset (Norway)	0–3	(Romania) Steaua București	0–1	0–2

=== UEFA Europa League ===
==== Qualifying phase ====
===== First qualifying round =====
Team 1	Agg.	Team 2	1st leg	2nd leg
Rosenborg (Norway)	6–0	(Latvia) Jelgava	4–0	2–0
Santos Tartu (Estonia)	1–13	(Norway) Tromsø	0–7	1–6
Airbus UK Broughton (Wales)	2–3	(Norway) Haugesund	1–1	1–2

===== Second qualifying round =====
Team 1	Agg.	Team 2	1st leg	2nd leg
Molde (Norway)	5–2	(Slovenia) Gorica	4–1	1–1
Víkingur Gøta (Faroe Islands)	2–1	(Norway) Tromsø	0–0	2–1
Rosenborg (Norway)	4–3	(Republic of Ireland) Sligo Rovers	1–2	3–1
Sarajevo (Bosnia and Herzegovina)	3–2	(Norway) Haugesund	0–1	3–1

===== Third qualifying round =====
Team 1	Agg.	Team 2	1st leg	2nd leg
Karabükspor (Turkey)	1–1 (a)	(Norway) Rosenborg	0–0	1–1
Zorya Luhansk (Ukraine)	3–2	(Norway) Molde	1–1	2–1

== UEFA Women's Champions League ==
=== Knockout phase ===
==== Round of 32 ====
Team 1	Agg.	Team 2	1st leg	2nd leg
Stabæk (Norway)	1–3	(Germany) Wolfsburg	0–1	1–2

== National teams ==
=== Norway men's national football team ===
15 January 2014 Exhibition game	Moldova	1–2	Norway	Abu Dhabi, United Arab Emirates
21:00 (UTC+4)	Posmac 30'	Report	Kamara 45+2'; de Lanlay 67'	Stadium: Zayed Sports City Stadium; Attendance: 100; Referee: Fahad Al Kassar Banihammad (United Arab Emirates)

18 January 2014 Exhibition game	Norway	0–3	Poland	Abu Dhabi, United Arab Emirates
18:00 (UTC+4)		Report	Brzyski 21'; Kucharczyk 47'; Linetty 56'	Stadium: Zayed Sports City Stadium; Attendance: 250; Referee: Rami Alkaabi (Bahrain)

5 March 2014 Exhibition game	Czech Republic	2–2	Norway	Prague, Czech Republic
18:30 (UTC+1)	Rosický 11'; Vydra 39'	Report	Elyounoussi 21'; Pedersen 88'	Stadium: Eden Aréna; Attendance: 17,039; Referee: Cüneyt Çakır (Turkey

27 May 2014 Exhibition game	France	4–0	Norway	Saint-Denis, France
21:00 (UTC+2)	Pogba 15'; Giroud 51', 69'; Rémy 67'	Report		Stadium: Stade de France; Attendance: 75,000; Referee: Pádraig Sutton (Republic of Ireland)

31 May 2014 Exhibition game	Norway	1–1	Russia	Oslo, Norway
16:00 (UTC+2)	Konradsen 77'	Report	Shatov 3'	Stadium: Ullevaal Stadion; Attendance: 11,486; Referee: Stephan Klossner (Switzerland)

27 August 2014 Exhibition game	Norway	0–0	United Arab Emirates	Stavanger, Norway
18:30 (UTC+2)		Report		Stadium: Viking Stadion; Attendance: 7,611; Referee: Mads-Kristoffer Kristoffersen (Denmark)

3 September 2014 Exhibition game	England	1–0	Norway	London, England
20:00 (UTC+1)	Rooney 68' (pen.)	Report		Stadium: Wembley Stadium; Attendance: 40,181; Referee: Jorge Sousa (Portugal)

9 September 2014 UEFA Euro 2016 qualifying	Norway	0–2	Italy	Oslo, Norway
20:45 (UTC+2)		Report	Zaza 16'; Bonucci 62'	Stadium: Ullevaal Stadion; Attendance: 26,265; Referee: Milorad Mažić (Serbia)

10 October 2014 UEFA Euro 2016 qualifying	Malta	0–3	Norway	Attard, Malta
20:45 (UTC+2)		Report	Dæhli 22'; King 26', 49'	Stadium: National Stadium; Attendance: 8,067; Referee: Antony Gautier (France)

13 October 2014 UEFA Euro 2016 qualifying	Norway	2–1	Bulgaria	Oslo, Norway
20:45 (UTC+2)	T. Elyounoussi 13'; Nielsen 72'	Report	Bodurov 43'	Stadium: Ullevaal Stadion; Attendance: 18,990; Referee: Olegário Benquerença (Portugal)

12 November 2014 Exhibition game	Norway	0–1	Estonia	Oslo, Norway
20:00 (UTC+1)		Report	Vassiljev 24'	Stadium: Ullevaal Stadion; Attendance: 9,580; Referee: Martin Hansson (Sweden)

16 November 2014 UEFA Euro 2016 qualifying	Azerbaijan	0–1	Norway	Baku, Azerbaijan
21:00 (UTC+4)		Report	Nordtveit 25'	Stadium: Bakcell Arena; Attendance: 9,200; Referee: Yevhen Aranovskiy (Ukraine)
