= 2000 Norwegian Second Division =

Norwegian football league season

The 2000 2. divisjon was the third highest football (soccer) league for men in Norway.

22 games were played in 8 groups, with 3 points given for wins and 1 for draws. Ørn-Horten, Mandalskameratene, Hødd and Aalesund were promoted to the First Division through playoffs against the other 4 group winners.

Because of the league being streamlined for the next season, more teams than usual—number nine, ten, eleven and twelve—were relegated to the 3. divisjon. The winning teams from each of the 24 groups in the 3. divisjon faced some teams placed seven and eight (except for the three worst eight-place teams) in the 2. divisjon in three-way playoff matches, resulting in 10 playoff winners which stayed or were promoted to the 2. divisjon.

== League tables ==
=== Group 1 ===
Pos	Team	Pld	W	D	L	GF	GA	GD	Pts	Relegation
1	Skjetten	22	14	3	5	61	27	+34	45	
2	Sprint-Jeløy	22	14	3	5	41	22	+19	45	
3	Åsane	22	13	5	4	65	24	+41	44	
4	Pors Grenland	22	11	6	5	47	37	+10	39	
5	Tollnes	22	11	4	7	51	35	+16	37	
6	Lyn 2	22	10	4	8	39	35	+4	34	
7	Ski (Note: Ski did not survive the relegation play-off.) (R)	22	9	5	8	36	37	−1	32	Relegation to Third Division
8	Strømmen (Note: Strømmen was relegated as the third worst eighth-place team.) (R)	22	8	2	12	29	62	−33	26	Relegation to Third Division
9	Mercantile/Lambertseter (R)	22	6	3	13	31	45	−14	21	Relegation to Third Division
10	Drøbak/Frogn (R)	22	5	6	11	32	49	−17	21	Relegation to Third Division
11	Lillestrøm 2 (R)	22	6	0	16	26	51	−25	18	Relegation to Third Division
12	Fossum (R)	22	4	1	17	19	53	−34	13	Relegation to Third Division

Source: rsssf.com
(R) Relegated

=== Group 2 ===
Pos	Team	Pld	W	D	L	GF	GA	GD	Pts	Relegation
1	FF Lillehammer	22	14	4	4	49	27	+22	46	
2	Ullern	22	14	3	5	55	30	+25	45	
3	Fredrikstad	22	13	5	4	57	30	+27	44	
4	Stabæk 2	22	13	3	6	58	28	+30	42	
5	Asker	22	13	3	6	46	24	+22	42	
6	Lørenskog	22	12	4	6	65	37	+28	40	
7	Gjøvik-Lyn (Note: Gjøvik-Lyn survived the relegation play-off.)	22	7	5	10	32	39	−7	26	
8	Elverum (Note: Elverum was relegated as the second worst eighth-place team.) (R)	22	7	4	11	52	50	+2	25	Relegation to Third Division
9	Sarpsborg Fotball (R)	22	6	7	9	33	36	−3	25	Relegation to Third Division
10	Årvoll (R)	22	6	3	13	28	52	−24	21	Relegation to Third Division
11	Vardal (R)	22	4	2	16	25	73	−48	14	Relegation to Third Division
12	Kongsvinger 2 (R)	22	0	3	19	27	101	−74	3	Relegation to Third Division

Source: rsssf.com
(R) Relegated

=== Group 3 ===
Pos	Team	Pld	W	D	L	GF	GA	GD	Pts	Promotion or relegation
1	Ørn-Horten (P)	22	14	4	4	53	30	+23	46	Promotion to First Division
2	Oslo Øst	22	14	2	6	58	37	+21	44	
3	Bærum	22	12	2	8	46	38	+8	38	
4	Odd Grenland 2	22	12	1	9	51	34	+17	37	
5	Ullensaker/Kisa	22	12	0	10	39	36	+3	36	
6	Kvik Halden	22	11	2	9	41	42	−1	35	
7	Vålerenga 2 (Note: Vålerenga 2 was forcibly relegated because their first team was relegated to the First Division.) (R)	22	9	6	7	40	28	+12	33	Relegation to Third Division
8	Eidsvold Turn (Note: Eidsvold Turn survived the relegation play-off.)	22	10	2	10	40	43	−3	32	
9	Skarphedin (R)	22	9	4	9	48	38	+10	31	Relegation to Third Division
10	Grei (R)	22	6	3	13	34	36	−2	21	Relegation to Third Division
11	Rakkestad (R)	22	6	0	16	46	80	−34	18	Relegation to Third Division
12	Eik-Tønsberg 2 (R)	22	3	2	17	24	78	−54	11	Relegation to Third Division

Source: rsssf.com
(P) Promoted; (R) Relegated

=== Group 4 ===
Pos	Team	Pld	W	D	L	GF	GA	GD	Pts	Promotion or relegation
1	Mandalskameratene (P)	22	16	2	4	71	28	+43	50	Promotion to First Division
2	Vidar	22	16	2	4	59	29	+30	50	
3	Viking 2	22	13	5	4	72	37	+35	44	
4	Vard Haugesund	22	11	7	4	56	27	+29	40	
5	Start 2 (Note: Start 2 was forcibly relegated because their first team was relegated to the First Division.) (R)	22	9	6	7	54	41	+13	33	Relegation to Third Division
6	Stord	22	8	6	8	61	53	+8	30	
7	Sandnes (Note: Sandnes and Nord survived the relegation play-off.)	22	8	5	9	34	46	−12	29	
8	Nord	22	9	1	12	51	56	−5	28	
9	Flekkefjord (R)	22	6	4	12	36	64	−28	22	Relegation to Third Division
10	Randaberg (R)	22	6	4	12	27	56	−29	22	Relegation to Third Division
11	Vigør (R)	22	4	3	15	36	58	−22	15	Relegation to Third Division
12	Hundvåg (R)	22	3	1	18	22	84	−62	10	Relegation to Third Division

Source: rsssf.com
(P) Promoted; (R) Relegated

=== Group 5 ===
Pos	Team	Pld	W	D	L	GF	GA	GD	Pts	Promotion or relegation
1	Hødd (P)	22	17	2	3	61	25	+36	53	Promotion to First Division
2	Fyllingen	22	14	3	5	53	30	+23	45	
3	Løv-Ham	22	14	2	6	55	27	+28	44	
4	Fana	22	11	4	7	52	33	+19	37	
5	Førde	22	10	4	8	47	43	+4	34	
6	Tornado	22	10	4	8	29	27	+2	34	
7	Florø	22	10	4	8	40	39	+1	34	
8	Os (Note: Os did not survive the relegation play-off.) (R)	22	8	4	10	46	33	+13	28	Relegation to Third Division
9	Fjøra (R)	22	8	3	11	39	59	−20	27	Relegation to Third Division
10	Ny-Krohnborg (R)	22	7	3	12	47	55	−8	24	Relegation to Third Division
11	Ørsta (R)	22	3	2	17	30	75	−45	11	Relegation to Third Division
12	Jotun (R)	22	2	1	19	24	77	−53	7	Relegation to Third Division

Source: rsssf.com
(P) Promoted; (R) Relegated

=== Group 6 ===
Pos	Team	Pld	W	D	L	GF	GA	GD	Pts	Promotion or relegation
1	Aalesund (P)	22	18	2	2	81	16	+65	56	Promotion to First Division
2	Skarbøvik	22	17	3	2	65	21	+44	54	
3	Clausenengen	22	14	4	4	79	37	+42	46	
4	Molde 2	22	12	4	6	57	43	+14	40	
5	Spjelkavik	22	12	0	10	38	46	−8	36	
6	Rosenborg 2	22	11	1	10	46	40	+6	34	
7	Træff (Note: Træff survived the relegation play-off.)	22	9	4	9	49	35	+14	31	
8	Stranda (Note: Stranda was relegated as the worst eighth-place team.) (R)	22	6	5	11	29	44	−15	23	Relegation to Third Division
9	Orkla (R)	22	5	5	12	30	62	−32	20	Relegation to Third Division
10	Dahle (R)	22	4	3	15	28	70	−42	15	Relegation to Third Division
11	Tiller (R)	22	4	3	15	39	82	−43	15	Relegation to Third Division
12	Sunndal (R)	22	2	2	18	25	70	−45	8	Relegation to Third Division

Source: rsssf.com
(P) Promoted; (R) Relegated

=== Group 7 ===
Pos	Team	Pld	W	D	L	GF	GA	GD	Pts	Relegation
1	Stålkameratene	22	16	2	4	72	34	+38	50	
2	Verdal	22	15	1	6	55	40	+15	46	
3	Ranheim	22	12	5	5	59	34	+25	41	
4	Steinkjer	22	13	2	7	58	38	+20	41	
5	Harstad	22	11	5	6	48	33	+15	38	
6	Mo	22	9	7	6	40	44	−4	34	
7	Fauske/Sprint (Note: Fauske/Sprint survived the relegation play-off.)	22	11	1	10	47	52	−5	34	
8	Kolstad (Note: Kolstad did not survive the relegation play-off.) (R)	22	9	2	11	48	50	−2	29	Relegation to Third Division
9	Mosjøen (R)	22	9	1	12	38	43	−5	28	Relegation to Third Division
10	Levanger (R)	22	7	5	10	29	37	−8	26	Relegation to Third Division
11	Steigen (R)	22	4	0	18	41	69	−28	12	Relegation to Third Division
12	Bodø/Glimt 2 (R)	22	0	1	21	24	85	−61	1	Relegation to Third Division

Source: rsssf.com
(R) Relegated

=== Group 8 ===
Pos	Team	Pld	W	D	L	GF	GA	GD	Pts	Relegation
1	Lofoten	22	20	0	2	90	25	+65	60	
2	Alta	22	19	0	3	99	34	+65	57	
3	Narvik	22	11	4	7	50	43	+7	37	
4	Skjervøy	22	10	5	7	46	42	+4	35	
5	Finnsnes	22	10	3	9	46	48	−2	33	
6	Skarp	22	10	2	10	46	40	+6	32	
7	Grovfjord (Note: Grovfjord and Lyngen/Karnes did not survive the relegation play-off.) (R)	22	9	4	9	43	52	−9	31	Relegation to Third Division
8	Lyngen/Karnes (R)	22	9	3	10	53	53	0	30	Relegation to Third Division
9	Senja (R)	22	9	0	13	48	67	−19	27	Relegation to Third Division
10	Vesterålen (R)	22	6	5	11	49	60	−11	23	Relegation to Third Division
11	Salangen (R)	22	3	3	16	38	80	−42	12	Relegation to Third Division
12	Bossekop (R)	22	0	3	19	31	95	−64	3	Relegation to Third Division

Source: rsssf.com
(R) Relegated

== Promotion playoffs ==
To the First Division from the 2. divisjon

To the 2. divisjon from the 3. divisjon
