= 2006 Norwegian Second Division =

Norwegian football league season

The 2006 2. divisjon season was the third highest football (soccer) league for men in Norway.

26 games were played in 4 groups, with 3 points given for wins and 1 for draws. Notodden, Skeid, Mandalskameratene and Raufoss were promoted to the First Division. Number twelve, thirteen and fourteen were relegated to the 3. divisjon. The winning teams from each of the 24 groups in the 3. divisjon each faced a winning team from another group in a playoff match, resulting in 12 playoff winners which were promoted to the 2. divisjon.

== League tables ==
=== Group 1 ===
Pos	Team	Pld	W	D	L	GF	GA	GD	Pts	Promotion or relegation
1	Notodden (P)	26	16	10	0	66	26	+40	58	Promotion to First Division
2	Bærum	26	17	5	4	60	28	+32	56	
3	Lørenskog	26	17	3	6	78	36	+42	54	
4	FK Tønsberg	26	14	8	4	61	26	+35	50	
5	Sprint/Jeløy	26	12	7	7	50	40	+10	43	
6	Drøbak/Frogn	26	10	6	10	59	47	+12	36	
7	Stabæk 2	26	9	5	12	48	39	+9	32	
8	Sarpsborg	26	9	4	13	45	61	−16	31	
9	Odd Grenland 2	26	9	3	14	46	64	−18	30	
10	Vålerenga 2	26	8	4	14	44	61	−17	28	
11	Åmot	26	8	3	15	33	59	−26	27	
12	Tollnes (R)	26	7	5	14	31	59	−28	26	Relegation to Third Division
13	Ørn-Horten (R)	26	5	6	15	33	77	−44	21	Relegation to Third Division
14	Årdal (R)	26	5	3	18	38	69	−31	18	Relegation to Third Division

(P) Promoted; (R) Relegated

=== Group 2 ===
Pos	Team	Pld	W	D	L	GF	GA	GD	Pts	Promotion or relegation
1	Skeid (P)	26	20	3	3	67	23	+44	63	Promotion to First Division
2	Groruddalen	26	16	7	3	73	39	+34	55	
3	Ranheim	26	13	6	7	63	40	+23	45	
4	Rosenborg 2	26	13	3	10	60	47	+13	42	
5	Strindheim	26	12	4	10	53	48	+5	40	
6	Byåsen	26	12	2	12	65	48	+17	38	
7	Kristiansund	26	11	5	10	44	33	+11	38	
8	Korsvoll	26	11	3	12	58	59	−1	36	
9	Steinkjer	26	11	3	12	56	59	−3	36	
10	Kjelsås	26	10	3	13	36	55	−19	33	
11	Molde 2 (R)	26	10	1	15	42	65	−23	31	Relegation to Third Division
12	Levanger	26	7	8	11	48	50	−2	29	
13	Kolstad (R)	26	6	3	17	47	84	−37	21	Relegation to Third Division
14	KIL/Hemne (R)	26	3	3	20	29	91	−62	12	Relegation to Third Division

(P) Promoted; (R) Relegated

=== Group 3 ===
Pos	Team	Pld	W	D	L	GF	GA	GD	Pts	Promotion or relegation
1	Mandalskameratene (P)	26	20	3	3	75	24	+51	63	Promotion to First Division
2	Sandnes Ulf	26	15	7	4	50	32	+18	52	
3	Vard Haugesund	26	14	4	8	62	39	+23	46	
4	Fyllingen	26	13	6	7	46	38	+8	45	
5	Start 2	26	12	5	9	59	50	+9	41	
6	Ålgård	26	11	5	10	48	51	−3	38	
7	Flekkerøy	26	11	4	11	50	45	+5	37	
8	Fana	26	11	3	12	54	57	−3	36	
9	Viking 2	26	11	2	13	46	54	−8	35	
10	Åsane	26	8	3	15	37	47	−10	27	
11	Askøy	26	8	3	15	36	62	−26	27	
12	Kopervik (R)	26	6	6	14	42	54	−12	24	Relegation to Third Division
13	Stord Sunnhordland (Note: Stord Sunnhordland was docked two points for using two non-eligible players.) (R)	26	7	4	15	33	55	−22	23	Relegation to Third Division
14	Klepp (R)	26	4	7	15	20	50	−30	19	Relegation to Third Division

(P) Promoted; (R) Relegated

=== Group 4 ===
Pos	Team	Pld	W	D	L	GF	GA	GD	Pts	Promotion or relegation
1	Raufoss (P)	26	17	6	3	72	38	+34	57	Promotion to First Division
2	Alta	26	16	6	4	75	36	+39	54	
3	Nybergsund	26	15	8	3	63	30	+33	53	
4	Eidsvold Turn	26	14	6	6	55	33	+22	48	
5	Mo	26	12	3	11	60	48	+12	39	
6	Ullensaker/Kisa	26	10	9	7	45	43	+2	39	
7	Harstad	26	10	3	13	47	54	−7	33	
8	Lillestrøm 2	26	9	5	12	47	48	−1	32	
9	Ham-Kam 2 (R)	26	10	2	14	40	49	−9	32	Relegation to Third Division
10	Gjøvik-Lyn	26	9	4	13	55	69	−14	31	
11	Hammerfest	26	8	5	13	35	50	−15	29	
12	Skarp	26	9	2	15	46	73	−27	29	
13	Brumunddal (R)	26	7	5	14	45	58	−13	26	Relegation to Third Division
14	Steigen (R)	26	3	2	21	33	89	−56	11	Relegation to Third Division

(P) Promoted; (R) Relegated

== Top goalscorers ==
- 27 goals:
  - (Norway) Kenneth Kvalheim, Notodden
- 23 goals:
  - (Norway) Andreas Moen, Lørenskog
  - (Norway) Christian Torbjørnsen, Groruddalen
  - (Sweden) Peter Samuelsson, Nybergsund
- 22 goals:
  - (Norway) Øystein Rogstad, Skeid
- 20 goals:
  - (Norway) Jarle Wee, Vard
- 19 goals:
  - (Norway) Fredrik William Henriksen, Flekkerøy
- 18 goals:
  - (Norway) Vegard Alstad Sunde, Levanger
- 17 goals:
  - (Norway) Kim Holmen, Lørenskog
  - (Norway) Kim Roger Strand, Eidsvold Turn
  - (The Gambia) Foday Scattred, Gjøvik-Lyn
