= 2012 Norwegian Second Division =

2. divisjon
- Season: 2012
- Champions: Elverum, Kristiansund, Vard Haugesund, Follo

The 2012 2. divisjon season began on 14 April 2012 and ended on 27 October 2012. The league consisted of 56 teams divided into 4 groups of 14 teams. The four group-winners, Elverum, Kristiansund, Vard Haugesund and Follo was promoted to the 1. divisjon, while the bottom three teams in each groups was relegated to the 3. divisjon.

== Teams ==
Asker, Løv-Ham (replaced by Fyllingsdalen (Note: Løv-Ham and Fyllingen merged and formed a new club, named FK Fyllingsdalen, which will take Løv-Ham's spot in 2. Divisjon. The club was first named FK Varden, but it was changed on 21 November 2011)), Nybergsund-Trysil and Randaberg were relegated from the 2011 1. divisjon, while Ullensaker/Kisa, Bærum, Notodden and Tromsdalen were promoted to the 2012 1. divisjon.

Tiller, Strindheim, Steinkjer, Herd, Jevnaker, Viking 2, Førde, Austevoll, Harstad, Hasle-Løren, Skarp along with Manglerud Star, who withdrew their team, were relegated from 2011 2. Divisjon.

Østsiden, Gjøvik FF, Grorud, Birkebeineren, Jerv, Egersund, (Note: Start 2 won the group, but since Start was relegated from Tippeligaen, Egersund was promoted) Brann 2, Fana, Træff, Buvik, Mo and Finnsnes were promoted from 2011 3. Divisjon as winners of their groups.

== League tables ==
=== Group 1 ===
2. Divisjon, group 1
- Season: 2012
- Champions: Elverum
- Relegated: Ørn-Horten, Lillehammer, Brumunddal
- Matches played: 182
- Goals scored: 615 (3.38 per match)
- Top goalscorer: Jean Alassane Mendy (25 goals)
- Biggest home win: Raufoss 7-0 Strømsgodset 2
- Biggest away win: Gjøvik 0-5 Raufoss
- Highest scoring: Strømsgodset 2 4-4 Grorud
- Longest winning run: 6 games – Elverum, Raufoss, Strømsgodset 2
- Longest unbeaten run: 10 games – Raufoss, Grorud, Lillehammer
- Longest winless run: 14 games – Brumunddal
- Longest losing run: 6 games – Brumunddal

Pos	Team	Pld	W	D	L	GF	GA	GD	Pts	Promotion or relegation
1	Elverum (P)	26	14	9	3	57	30	+27	51	Promotion to First Division
2	Raufoss	26	13	7	6	54	26	+28	46	
3	Nybergsund-Trysil	26	13	5	8	49	32	+17	44	
4	Birkebeineren	26	13	4	9	50	46	+4	43	
5	Strømsgodset 2	26	11	5	10	57	68	−11	38	
6	Fram Larvik	26	10	6	10	39	37	+2	36	
7	Valdres	26	10	6	10	38	40	−2	36	
8	Gjøvik	26	9	9	8	38	43	−5	36	
9	Vålerenga 2	26	9	6	11	44	43	+1	33	
10	Grorud	26	7	11	8	44	40	+4	32	
11	Tønsberg (Note: Tønsberg were deducted 2 point for using an illegal player. This was reduced to 1 point on appeal.)	26	10	3	13	32	52	−20	32	
12	Ørn-Horten (R)	26	8	4	14	42	50	−8	28	Relegation to Third Division
13	Lillehammer (R)	26	6	10	10	42	54	−12	28	Relegation to Third Division
14	Brumunddal (R)	26	3	7	16	29	54	−25	16	Relegation to Third Division

Source: nifs.no
Rules for classification: 1) points; 2) goal difference; 3) number of goals scored.
(P) Promoted; (R) Relegated

=== Group 2 ===
2. Divisjon, group 2
- Season: 2012
- Champions: Kristiansund
- Relegated: Skeid, Buvik, Aalesund 2
- Matches played: 182
- Goals scored: 743 (4.08 per match)
- Top goalscorer: Karim Aoudia (24 goals)
- Biggest home win: Molde 2 8-0 Rosenborg 2
- Biggest away win: Aalesund 2 1-8 Rosenborg 2
- Highest scoring: Træff 7-3 Aalesund 2
- Longest winning run: 11 games – Kristiansund
- Longest unbeaten run: 21 games – Kristiansund
- Longest winless run: 12 games – Aalesund 2
- Longest losing run: 12 games – Aalesund 2

Pos	Team	Pld	W	D	L	GF	GA	GD	Pts	Promotion or relegation
1	Kristiansund (P)	26	22	2	2	77	18	+59	68	Promotion to First Division
2	Nardo	26	15	5	6	58	42	+16	50	
3	Fyllingsdalen	26	14	5	7	51	37	+14	47	
4	Byåsen	26	14	5	7	57	47	+10	47	
5	Kjelsås	26	14	2	10	58	48	+10	44	
6	Rosenborg 2	26	11	5	10	63	50	+13	38	
7	KFUM Oslo	26	11	5	10	48	49	−1	38	
8	Levanger	26	10	4	12	53	48	+5	34	
9	Træff	26	8	8	10	51	50	+1	32	
10	Molde 2	26	9	5	12	65	67	−2	32	
11	Fana	26	8	6	12	54	52	+2	30	
12	Skeid (R)	26	7	5	14	42	55	−13	26	Relegation to Third Division
13	Buvik (R)	26	4	4	18	41	88	−47	16	Relegation to Third Division
14	Aalesund 2 (R)	26	4	1	21	25	92	−67	13	Relegation to Third Division

Source: nifs.no
Rules for classification: 1) points; 2) goal difference; 3) number of goals scored.
(P) Promoted; (R) Relegated

=== Group 3 ===
2. Divisjon, group 3
- Season: 2012
- Champions: Vard Haugesund
- Relegated: Jerv, Mandalskameratene, Randaberg
- Matches played: 182
- Goals scored: 650 (3.57 per match)
- Top goalscorer: Øyvind Gausdal (23 goals)
- Biggest home win: Brann 2 6-1 Odd Grenland 2
- Biggest away win: Mandalskameratene 2-7 Vindbjart
- Highest scoring: Brann 2 5-4 Nest-Sotra
- Longest winning run: 6 games – Pors Grenland
- Longest unbeaten run: 12 games – Vard Haugesund
- Longest winless run: 12 games – Mandalskameratene
- Longest losing run: 6 games – Brann 2

Pos	Team	Pld	W	D	L	GF	GA	GD	Pts	Promotion or relegation
1	Vard Haugesund (P)	26	15	8	3	60	26	+34	53	Promotion to First Division
2	Flekkerøy	26	14	4	8	53	30	+23	46	
3	Åsane	26	11	7	8	46	44	+2	40	
4	Nest-Sotra	26	12	3	11	50	47	+3	39	
5	Vidar	26	10	8	8	42	42	0	38	
6	Ålgård	26	11	5	10	36	48	−12	38	
7	Brann 2	26	11	4	11	60	63	−3	37	
8	Pors Grenland	26	10	6	10	40	36	+4	36	
9	Vindbjart	26	9	8	9	56	47	+9	35	
10	Egersund	26	9	8	9	46	45	+1	35	
11	Odd Grenland 2	26	10	3	13	39	47	−8	33	
12	Jerv (R)	26	9	5	12	45	53	−8	32	Relegation to Third Division
13	Mandalskameratene (R)	26	6	6	14	46	72	−26	24	Relegation to Third Division
14	Randaberg (R)	26	6	3	17	31	49	−18	21	Relegation to Third Division

Source: nifs.no
Rules for classification: 1) points; 2) goal difference; 3) number of goals scored.
(P) Promoted; (R) Relegated

=== Group 4 ===
2. Divisjon, group 4
- Season: 2012
- Champions: Follo
- Relegated: Mjølner, Finnsnes, Stabæk 2
- Matches played: 182
- Goals scored: 624 (3.43 per match)
- Top goalscorer: Eirik Markegård (19 goals)
- Biggest home win: Frigg 7-1 Asker
- Biggest away win: Østsiden 1-5 Moss
- Highest scoring: Senja 5-3 Moss
- Longest winning run: 8 games – Senja
- Longest unbeaten run: 13 games – Lørenskog
- Longest winless run: 8 games – Frigg
- Longest losing run: 5 games – Tromsø 2, Finnsnes, Stabæk 2

Pos	Team	Pld	W	D	L	GF	GA	GD	Pts	Promotion or relegation
1	Follo (P)	26	18	2	6	58	28	+30	56	Promotion to First Division
2	Lørenskog	26	16	3	7	51	39	+12	51	
3	Senja	26	15	5	6	54	44	+10	50	
4	Asker	26	14	5	7	54	36	+18	47	
5	Kvik Halden	26	11	6	9	53	40	+13	39	
6	Østsiden	26	12	3	11	45	43	+2	39	
7	Nesodden	26	9	7	10	39	47	−8	34	
8	Frigg	26	9	5	12	53	58	−5	32	
9	Mo	26	9	4	13	41	49	−8	31	
10	Moss	26	8	6	12	42	46	−4	30	
11	Tromsø 2	26	8	3	15	35	48	−13	27	
12	Mjølner (R)	26	7	6	13	26	41	−15	27	Relegation to Third Division
13	Finnsnes (R)	26	8	3	15	35	51	−16	27	Relegation to Third Division
14	Stabæk 2 (R)	26	8	2	16	36	52	−16	26	Relegation to Third Division

Source: nifs.no
Rules for classification: 1) points; 2) goal difference; 3) number of goals scored.
(P) Promoted; (R) Relegated
