= IF Birkebeineren =

Norwegian football club

- Full name: Idrettsforeningen Birkebeineren
- Founded: 4 January 1904
- Ground: Årbogen stadion, Krokstadelva
- League: Fourth Division
- 2025: 7th

Idrettsforeningen Birkebeineren is a Norwegian multi-sports club from Krokstadelva, Nedre Eiker. It has sections for association football, team handball, Nordic skiing, cycling and tennis.

The club was founded on 4 January 1904 and named after the Birkebeiner warriors who were associated with skiing. For a period, the club was a member of the Workers' Confederation of Sports. The team colours are blue with yellow details.

In the Workers' Confederation of Sports, Birkebeineren won the cup finals of 1935 and 1939. After the Second World War, the Workers' Confederation of Sports was incorporated into the Norwegian Confederation of Sports, and Birkebeineren was allowed to contest the highest league for men, the 1947–48 League of Norway. Finishing third of eight, they were still relegated because of a streamlining of the league. First, Birkebeineren reached a relegation playout, but lost to Sandaker SFK. In the 1948–49 season, the team finished fourth in its group on the second tier. The team also reached the third round of the cup in 1945 and 1946.

The men's football team reached the first round of the cup in 1980, 1981 and 1982, but failed to progress with their biggest loss being 8–0. In the 1990s, Birkebeineren were relegated from the Third Division in 1992, but returned for a long, continuous spell from 1996 to 2011. During this time, Birkebeineren won their Third Division group several times. This entailed play-offs to the Norwegian Second Division in both 2001 and 2009, but both were lost. In 2011, with the play-offs being discontinued, Birkebeineren finally won promotion to the Second Division. The team enjoyed three seasons here; 2012, 2013 and 2014 before relegation.

The team sporadically reached the first round of the cup in 1998, 2000, 2003 and 2006. During their peak in the 2010s, Birkebeineren reached the first round in 2010, 2012 and 2014, and the second round in 2011 and 2013. After their heyday, Birkebeineren immediately ended last in the 2015 Third Division and spent the following decade between the Fourth and Fifth Division.

The men's football team currently plays in the Fourth Division, the fifth tier of football in Norway. The club currently fields no women's team.

Being located near two of Norway's leading bandy clubs of all time, Solberg and Mjøndalen, Birkebeineren used to have a bandy section as well. It also had a gymnastics section.
