= Vaulen IL =

Norwegian football club

- Full name: Vaulen Idrettslag
- Founded: 15 March 1938; 88 years ago
- Ground: Vaulenbanen; Hinna
- League: Fourth Division
Home colours

Vaulen Idrettslag is a Norwegian association football club from Stavanger.

The men's football team currently plays in the Third Division, the fourth tier of Norwegian football. The team had a long stints in the Third Division from 2001 to 2010 and again from 2013 to 2015. After winning its group in 2002, Vaulen even contested a playoff to the 2. Divisjon, but lost, and was not promoted.

The club colors are orange. Yann-Erik de Lanlay started his career here.
