= Frøya FK =

Norwegian football club

- Full name: Frøya Fotballklubb
- Founded: November 5, 1990
- Ground: Frøya idrettspark, Hammarvika
- League: 5. Divisjon
Home colours

Frøya Fotballklubb is a Norwegian association football club from Frøya Municipality in Trøndelag county.

The club was founded on 5 November 1990 as a cooperation team between the multi-sports clubs Frøya IL, Nabeita IL, and Sistranda IL.

The men's football team currently plays in the Fourth Division, the fourth tier of Norwegian football. It has had stints in the 3. divisjon from 1999 to 2000 and 2010 to 2012.
