= Trosvik IF =

Norwegian sports club

- Full name: Trosvik Idrettsforening
- Founded: 1 April 1946
- Ground: Merkur, Fredrikstad
- Capacity: 2000
- League: 6. divisjon

Trosvik Idrettsforening is a Norwegian sports club.

The men's football team plays in the 6. divisjon, the seventh tier of Norwegian football. The team played in the 3. divisjon from 2010 to 2012 and 2014 to 2016.

Players growing up in Trosvik IF include Tarik Elyounoussi, Lasse Staw and Tore Pedersen.
