= Lillehammer FK =

Norwegian football club

- Full name: Lillehammer Fotballklubb
- Nickname: LFK
- Founded: 1911
- Ground: Stampesletta, Lillehammer
- Chairman: Gudmund Bakken
- Head Coach: Morten Skjærstad
- League: 3. divisjon
- 2026: 3. divisjon / Group 3, 4th of 14
Home colours	Away colours

Lillehammer Fotballklubb is a Norwegian football club from Lillehammer, currently playing in the 3. divisjon, the third tier of the Norwegian football league system. The club colors are white, and the home field is Stampesletta. Players who started their career there include David Hanssen and Caleb Francis.

== History ==
Logo of Faaberg Fotball Lillehammer.

Lillehammer FK was established in 1969 as a result of a merger of Lillehammer clubs SK Mesna and FK Fremad Lillehammer (founded 1911). The club played its first season, the 1969 season, in 4. divisjon. In the following 1970 season, Danish full-time coach Frank Gaba was hired.

The club went through a period as Faaberg Fotball Lillehammer after a merger at the end of the season in 1999 between the senior team of Lillehammer FK and the football department of Faaberg IL; Faaberg Fotball. Ahead of the 2010 season the entire club Lillehammer FK incorporated the senior and junior team of FF Lillehammer, which thus ceased to exist, while Faaberg IL reverted to fielding its own team.

Lillehammer FK played in the 3. divisjon from the 2013 season, after a period in the 2. divisjon since the 2009 season, having avoided relegation after the 2010 season due to the bankruptcy of FC Lyn Oslo. In the 2017 season, Lillehammer was relegated to the fifth tier until the 2021 season when the team was promoted back to the fourth tier. They were relegated again the following season and then missed promotion due to goal difference in 2023. In the 2024 season, Lillehammer was promoted back to the fourth tier.

== Recent history ==
Season		Pos.	Pl.	W	D	L	GS	GA	P	Cup	Notes
2000– 2009	Competed as Faaberg Fotball Lillehammer										
2010	2. divisjon	12	26	9	4	13	45	53	31	Second round	Avoided relegation due to the bankruptcy of FC Lyn Oslo
2011	2. divisjon	9	24	8	5	11	39	56	29	First round	
2012	2. divisjon	↓ 13	25	6	10	10	42	54	28	First round	Relegated
2013	3. divisjon	4	26	16	4	6	75	34	52	Second qualifying round	
2014	3. divisjon	4	26	14	5	7	60	33	47	Second qualifying round	
2015	3. divisjon	3	26	14	6	6	77	27	48	First round	
2016	3. divisjon	3	26	14	7	5	54	26	49	Second round	
2017	3. divisjon	↓ 11	26	8	5	13	54	57	29	First qualifying round	Relegated
2018	4. divisjon	2	22	18	0	4	77	11	54	First round	
2019	4. divisjon	4	22	12	3	7	70	37	39	First round	
2020	4. divisjon	season cancelled									
2021	4. divisjon	↑ 1	12	9	0	3	28	10	27		Promoted
2022	3. divisjon	↓ 13	26	4	7	15	27	55	19	Second qualifying round	Relegated
2023	4. divisjon	2	26	21	4	1	86	19	67	First round	
2024	4. divisjon	↑ 1	26	20	1	5	102	35	61	First qualifying round	Promoted
2025	3. divisjon	4	26	14	6	6	48	44	48	First round	
2026	3. divisjon	↑ 1	26	20	2	4	96	37	62		Promoted
