= Mo IL =

Norwegian football club

Mo
- Full name: Mo Idrettslag
- Founded: 5 May 1904
- Ground: Sagbakken stadion
- Capacity: 1,000
Home colours	Away colours

Mo Idrettslag is a football club from Mo i Rana, Norway.

== History ==
Mo IL was founded in 1904, as the first football club in Nord-Norge. In the first couple of years, Mo only played against teams with Englishmen working in the area, but on 7 June 1907 Ranen Kompani was beaten 2–1 in the first match between two teams from Nord-Norge.

One of the most memorable moments from the 2004-season was the 0–2. loss against Tromsø IL, fielding players such as Morten Gamst Pedersen in their starting eleven, in the third round of the 2004 Norwegian Football Cup. On their way to the third round, they beat the second-tier team Strømsgodset IF 2–0.

Mo IL narrowly missed out on promotion to 1. divisjon in the 2005 season. Having led the table for much of the season, their promotion chances were ruined due to form declination during the season-ending fixtures.

Before the start of 2006 2. divisjon, there was a media-hype around Mo's chances for promotion. Mo IL got off to a horrendous start of the season, going through the eight first matches without one single victory. Media was speculating whether the current manager, Thor André Olsen, was going to be sacked. In an unlikely turn of events, a giant form leap during the autumn of 2006 took Mo from the very bottom of the table to a worthy fifth place at the season's end.

Mo was relegated from the 2. divisjon in 2010, but won their group in the 3. divisjon and won promotion in 2011. Again relegated in 2014, a victory in the 3. divisjon in 2015 led to another spell in the 2016 2. divisjon.

Notable former members include the football coaches Trond Sollied, Thor André Olsen and Charles Berstad, as well as the former football referee Jonny Ditlefsen.

== Recent history ==
Season		Pos.	Pl.	W	D	L	GS	GA	P	Cup	Notes
2004	2. divisjon	4	26	15	5	6	51	30	50	Third round	
2005	2. divisjon	2	26	15	2	9	59	44	47	Second round	
2006	2. divisjon	5	26	12	3	11	60	48	39	First round	
2007	2. divisjon	8	26	11	4	11	38	43	37	Third round	
2008	2. divisjon	8	26	11	3	12	54	45	36	Second round	
2009	2. divisjon	11	26	6	10	10	40	55	28	First round	
2010	2. divisjon	↓ 14	26	3	4	19	26	85	13	First round	Relegated to the 3. divisjon
2011	3. divisjon	↑ 1	22	17	3	2	79	22	54	First round	Promoted to the 2. divisjon
2012	2. divisjon	9	26	9	4	13	41	49	31	Second round	
2013	2. divisjon	6	26	12	4	10	47	44	40	First round	
2014	2. divisjon	↓ 13	26	3	4	19	22	87	13	Second round	Relegated to the 3. divisjon
2015	3. divisjon	↑ 1	22	18	3	1	82	25	57	First round	Promoted to the 2. divisjon
2016	2. divisjon	↓ 14	26	3	1	22	31	94	10	Second round	Relegated to 3. divisjon
2017	3. divisjon	↓ 11	26	10	4	12	54	63	34	First round	Relegated to 4. divisjon
2018	4. divisjon	3	16	10	2	4	58	19	32	First round	

== Other sections ==
In the past, Mo IL has had sections in other sports than football. From their now-defunct athletics section, Marit Hemstad participated in the European Championships. Famous politician Gerd-Liv Valla was a middle-distance runner for Mo IL as a teenager.
