= Dahle IL =

Norwegian sports club

- Full name: Dahle Idrettslag
- Founded: 1938
- Ground: Dahle idrettspark, Kristiansund
- Manager: Julian Vangen
- League: Third Division
Home colours

Dahle Idrettslag is a Norwegian association football club from Kristiansund, Møre og Romsdal.

The men's football team currently plays in the Third Division, the fourth tier of Norwegian football. It last played in the Norwegian Second Division in 2000. In 2001 they won their Third Division group, but in the two-leg playoff they succumbed to Langevåg IL on the away goals rule after 5–5 on aggregate.
