= Kopervik IL =

Norwegian football club

- Full name: Kopervik Idrettslag
- Nickname: Kilane
- Founded: 6 February 1924
- Ground: Åsebøen stadion, Kopervik
- League: Fourth Division
- 2024: 9th

Kopervik Idrettslag is a Norwegian multi-sports club from the town of Kopervik in Karmøy Municipality. The club has sections for association football, team handball, and athletics.

The club was founded on 6 February 1924. Practising athletics, the club was based upon Haugesund IL. Football commenced in 1928, then boxing, and handball formally in 1946. Handball and boxing both went defunct around 1949, but was started again in 1976, followed by an orienteering section in 1979. A section for gymnastics existed from 1938 to 1975, then again from 1980.

The club's first sports field was a 100-metre athletics track, then a multi-sports field at Søyletjødnå. This was bought by the municipality to construct Stangeland lower secondary school, whereupon Kopervik IL built their stadium Åsebøen. The team colours are green and white.

The men's football team currently plays in the Fourth Division, the fifth tier of football in Norway.

After the war, Kopervik got one season on the second tier in 1949–50, but was instantly relegated. After Landsdelsserien was created as the second tier in 1951, Kopervik had spells in that league in 1953–54, 1955–56 and 1959–60, but were again relegated instantly, each season with only one victory. Their next and last spell on the second tier happened from 1980 to 1983. Following these years, however, Kopervik IL found themselves in a financial crisis and had to be salvaged by the municipality.

Before 1980, Kopervik had a notable cup run in 1970, which ended in the third round against Brann. In the 1980s, then, Kopervik was a mainstay in the cup, reaching the first round in 1983, 1984, 1986 and 1989; the second round in 1980, 1982, 1988 and 1990; and the third round in 1981. After a few years' hiatus, Kopervik reached the first round in 1994, 1998 and 1999; and the second round in 1996. Some years passed again before Kopervik reached the first round in 2003, 2005, 2008, 2010, 2011 and 2013; the second round in 2006 and 2009; and the third round in 2007.

Kopervik was promoted from the Third Division to the Second Division, the third tier, in 1993. The team then played in the Second Division from 1994 to 1997, Third Division from 1998 to 1999, Second Division in 2000, and the Third Division from 2001 to 2005. The team then won a playoff to the Second Division, was instantly relegated in 2006, won their Third Division group in 2007 but lost the playoff, before winning it in 2008. Their last stint in the Second Division in 2009 and 2010 was then followed by its last stint in the Third Division ranged from 2011 to 2015.

The women's team currently plays in the Third Division.
