= Steigen SPK =

Norwegian sports club

- Full name: Steigen Sportsklubb
- Founded: 1947
- League: Fourth Division
- 2012: Fourth Division / Nordland, 1st
Home colours

Steigen Sportsklubb is a Norwegian sports club from Steigen, Nordland. It has sections for association football, team handball, floorball, orienteering, archery and Nordic skiing.

The men's football team currently plays in the Fourth Division, the fifth tier of Norwegian football, after being relegated from the Third Division in 2010. It last played in the Second Division in 2006. After the 2002 season it contested a playoff to win promotion, but failed (it did succeed after the 2005 season, but was relegated straight back).

== Recent history ==
Season		Pos.	Pl.	W	D	L	GS	GA	P	Cup	Notes
2005	D2	13	20	16	1	3	97	35	49		Promoted to 2. Division
2006	D2	14	22	3	2	21	33	89	11	1st round	Relegated to 3. Division
2007	D3	2	22	15	2	5	67	34	47		Promoted to 2. Division
2008	D3	3	22	14	4	4	76	37	46	1st qualifying round	
2009	D3	3	20	12	4	4	59	43	40	1st qualifying round	
2010	D3	7	22	6	6	10	41	63	24	2nd qualifying round	Relegated to 4. Division
2011	D4	2	18	14	1	3	66	30	43		
2012	D4	1	18	16	1	1	85	22	49		Promoted to 3. Division
2013	D3	9	22	7	3	12	54	66	24	1st qualifying round	
