= Lyngen/Karnes IL =

Norwegian sports club

- Full name: Lyngen/Karnes Idrettslag
- Founded: 1933
- Ground: Geitnes kunstgress, Karnes or Polleidet
- League: Third Division
- 2011: Third Division / 12, 2nd
Home colours

Lyngen/Karnes Idrettslag is a Norwegian sports club from Lyngen Municipality in Troms county. It has sections for association football and Nordic skiing.

The men's football team currently plays in the Third Division, the fourth tier of Norwegian football. It played in the Second Division for many years up to and including 2000, when it succumbed in a relegation playoff. It contested a promotion playoff in 2001, but lost to Bossekop UL. It succeeded in 2004, but was relegated after the 2005 Norwegian Second Division. Former players include Trond Olsen.
