= Viking FK 2 =

Norwegian football team

Viking 2
- Full name: Viking Fotballklubb 2
- Ground: Viking Stadion, Stavanger
- Capacity: 15,900
- Chair: Stig Christiansen
- Manager: Espen Andersen
- League: Second Division
- 2023: Third Division group 3, 1st of 14 (promoted)
- Website: www.vikingfotball.no
Home colours	Away colours

Viking FK 2, commonly known as just Viking 2, is the reserve team of Viking FK. They currently play in the Norwegian Second Division.

== History ==
Since year 2000, Viking 2 have played in the Norwegian Second Division and the Norwegian Third Division. Their best position is a 1st place finish in the 2005 Second Division. As reserve teams are not allowed to play in the Norwegian First Division, second placed FK Haugesund were promoted instead.

== Recent seasons ==
Season	League									Notes
Season	Division	Pos	Pld	W	D	L	GF	GA	Pts	Notes
2000	2. divisjon	3rd	22	13	5	4	72	37	44	
2001	2. divisjon	7th	26	11	4	11	71	65	37	
2002	2. divisjon	8th	26	9	5	12	59	53	32	
2003	2. divisjon	8th	26	8	9	9	37	37	33	
2004	2. divisjon	4th	26	12	4	10	43	37	40	
2005	2. divisjon	1st	26	17	5	4	46	19	56	
2006	2. divisjon	9th	26	11	2	13	46	54	35	
2007	2. divisjon	8th	26	11	3	12	52	45	36	
2008	2. divisjon	↓ 14th	26	3	7	16	36	81	16	Relegated
2009	3. divisjon	1st	26	20	4	2	141	33	64	
2010	3. divisjon	↑ 1st	26	20	5	1	107	28	65	Promoted
2011	2. divisjon	↓ 12th	26	7	8	11	36	55	29	Relegated
2012	3. divisjon	↑ 1st	26	23	1	2	102	28	70	Promoted
2013	2. divisjon	↓ 13th	26	8	6	12	34	43	30	Relegated
2014	3. divisjon	4th	26	14	4	8	64	57	46	
2015	3. divisjon	3rd	26	13	7	6	69	40	46	
2016	3. divisjon	1st	24	17	3	4	75	28	54	
2017	3. divisjon	6th	26	11	4	11	52	53	37	
2018	3. divisjon	4th	26	14	4	8	77	44	46	
2019	3. divisjon	3rd	26	16	4	6	85	39	52	
2020	Season cancelled									
2021	3. divisjon	6th	13	6	2	5	29	20	20	
2022	3. divisjon	8th	26	10	5	11	57	55	35	
2023	3. divisjon	↑ 1st	26	20	4	2	78	25	64	Promoted
