= Brumunddal Fotball =

Sports club in Norway

Brumunddal
- Full name: Brumunddal Fotball
- Founded: 1895; 131 years ago
- Ground: Sveum Idrettspark, Brumunddal
- Capacity: 4000
- Chairman: Guttorm Tysnes
- Coach: Erik Wettermark
- League: Third Division
- 2025: Fourth Division group IØ, 1st of 14 (promoted)
Home colours	Away colours

Brumunddal Fotball is the football section of the Norwegian alliance sports club Brumunddal IL, located in Brumunddal, Hedmark. The organizational independency of the football section dates from 2003, although its parent club was founded in 1895. The men's football team currently plays in the 3. divisjon, the fourth tier of Norwegian football.

== History ==
The team played in the Third Division, but after being relegated in 1995 it languished in the Fourth Division. Its return to the Third Division in 1998 also became short-lived. The team then had a longer stint from 2001 to 2004, when Strømmen IF was beaten in the playoffs, securing promotion to the 2005 Norwegian Second Division. The team had lost similar playoffs in 2003 and 2002. Brumunddal was instantly relegated to the Third Division again, but won the 2009 playoffs and has since played in the Second Division again.

Its most notable player was Vemund Brekke Skard, who transferred from Brumunddal to Ipswich Town in 2005. Vegard Skogheim has coached the team. Also, Eldar Hadžimehmedović has played for the team.

== Recent history ==
Season		Pos.	Pl.	W	D	L	GS	GA	P	Cup	Notes
2008	3. divisjon	2	22	19	2	1	80	23	59	1st round	
2009	3. divisjon	↑ 1	22	17	3	2	77	19	54	1st qual. round	Promoted
2010	2. divisjon	3	26	14	4	8	62	50	46	2nd round	
2011	2. divisjon	5	24	12	2	10	54	43	38	1st round	
2012	2. divisjon	↓ 14	26	3	7	16	29	54	16	1st round	Relegated
2013	3. divisjon	↑ 1	26	20	3	3	112	29	63	1st round	Promoted
2014	2. divisjon	9	26	8	6	12	33	38	30	1st round	
2015	2. divisjon	8	26	10	7	9	33	36	37	1st round	
2016	2. divisjon	4	26	12	6	8	32	33	42	1st round	
2017	2. divisjon	↓ 13	26	6	4	16	21	46	22	2nd round	Relegated
2018	3. divisjon	4	26	11	10	5	43	32	43	1st round	
2019	3. divisjon	7	26	11	5	10	51	40	38	1st round	
2020	3. divisjon	Season cancelled									
2021	3. divisjon	4	13	7	3	3	33	15	24	1st round	
2022	3. divisjon	8	26	8	6	12	51	48	30	2nd round	
2023	3. divisjon	↓ 7	26	9	8	9	44	59	35	1st round	Withdrawn^{1}
2024	4. divisjon	2	26	17	7	2	97	31	58		
2025	4. divisjon	↑ 1	26	21	3	2	87	26	66	1st round	Promoted
2026	3. divisjon									1st round	

- ^{1} Before the 2024 season, Brumunddal withdrew their team from 3. divisjon in protest of high travel costs as they were placed in a group of teams mostly from northern Norway. Fyllingsdalen took their spot in 3. divisjon while Brumunddal voluntarily relegated themselves to 4. divisjon.
