= FK Mandalskameratene =

Association football club

Mandalskameratene
- Full name: Fotballklubben Mandalskameratene
- Nickname: Gudan (The Boys)
- Short name: MK
- Founded: 1 July 1912; 113 years ago
- Ground: Idrettsparken (Mandal)
- Capacity: 4,500
- Head coach: Per Gunnar Laudal
- League: Fourth Division
- 2024: Third Division group 2, 12th of 14 (relegated)
Home colours	Away colours

FK Mandalskameratene is a Norwegian football club, from the town of Mandal in Agder, currently playing in the 4. divisjon. The club was founded on 1 July 1912, under the name of 'Alladin'. In 1918 the club changed its name to 'Mandalskameratene'.

== History ==
Results have varied over the years. Making it to the 3rd round of the cup in 1964 was until recently the club's greatest achievement. As recently as the late 80s Mandalskameratene played in the 5th level of the Norwegian league system. Then a period of steady advancement started, and in 2000 the team was promoted to the First Division. They have since played several seasons in the First Division, but spent the 2002 and 2006 seasons in the Second Division, and were again relegated in 2007. In 2009, the club was relegated to the Third Division. In the 2010 season, it won all its 26 league matches in the Agder section of the Third Division. It played off against Skarphedin for promotion to the Second Division, and won promotion after losing 2–0 away but winning 6–0 at home.

== Recent history ==
Season		Pos.	Pl.	W	D	L	GS	GA	P	Cup	Notes
2000	2. divisjon	↑ 1	22	16	2	4	71	28	50	2nd round	Promoted
2001	1. divisjon	↓ 13	30	9	5	16	49	62	32	2nd round	Relegated
2002	2. divisjon	↑ 1	26	18	7	1	69	19	61	3rd round	Promoted
2003	1. divisjon	7	30	14	7	9	57	51	49	4th round	
2004	1. divisjon	5	30	13	6	11	51	55	45	4th round	
2005	1. divisjon	↓ 13	30	7	8	15	41	54	29	3rd round	Relegated
2006	2. divisjon	↑ 1	26	20	3	3	75	24	63	4th round	Promoted
2007	1. divisjon	↓ 16	30	4	7	19	43	92	19	2nd round	Relegated
2008	2. divisjon	4	26	12	3	11	60	46	39	2nd round	
2009	2. divisjon	↓ 13	26	6	4	16	33	60	22	1st round	Relegated
2010	3. divisjon	↑ 1	26	26	0	0	106	17	78	2nd round	Promoted
2011	2. divisjon	10	26	8	7	11	45	59	31	2nd round	
2012	2. divisjon	↓ 13	26	6	6	14	46	73	24	1st round	Relegated
2013	3. divisjon	5	26	11	3	10	40	36	36	1st qualifying round	
2014	3. divisjon	9	26	9	5	12	51	46	32	1st qualifying round	
2015	3. divisjon	8	26	8	8	10	52	54	32	1st qualifying round	
2016	3. divisjon	↓ 8	24	11	1	12	50	50	34	2nd qualifying round	Relegated
2017	4. divisjon	6	24	10	7	7	61	41	37	1st qualifying round	
2018	4. divisjon	↑ 1	26	14	7	5	69	43	49	2nd qualifying round	Promoted
2019	3. divisjon	2	26	16	5	5	68	43	53	1st qualifying round	
2020	Season cancelled										
2021	3. divisjon	11	13	4	4	5	27	22	16	1st round	
2022	3. divisjon	11	26	7	6	13	52	59	27	1st qualifying round	
