= Skarbøvik IF =

Norwegian sports club

- Full name: Skarbøvik Idrettsforening
- Founded: 1930
- Ground: Skarbøvik Stadion; Ålesund
- Head Coach: Nils Inge Bjerknes
- League: Third division
- 2013: Second Division / 1, 12th (relegated)
Home colours	Away colours

Skarbøvik Idrettsforening is a Norwegian sports club based in the outermost part of Ålesund, Møre og Romsdal. The club have teams in both football and handball. The first team in football plays in the Third Division. Skarbøvik has in the recent years alternated between the Second Division and the Third Division.

Skarbøvik won promotion to the Second Division in 2007 after beating Træff 7–2 on aggregate in the promotion playoff. Skarbøvik played three seasons in the Second Division, but were relegated in the 2010 season after finishing one point behind Byåsen who kept clear of relegation. Skarbøvik and Træff finished the 2011 season equally on points, but due to the goal-difference Skarbøvik finished second while Træff won promotion. In 2012, Skarbøvik won promotion to the Second Division, which was secured after a 4–2 victory against Elnesvågen/Omegn on 5 October 2012. Skarbøvik was relegated to the Third Division after only one season.
