= Elnesvågen og Omegn IL =

Norwegian sports club

- Full name: Elnesvågen og Omegn Idrettslag
- Founded: 3 September 1922
- Ground: Elnesvågen Stadion; Elnesvågen, Hustadvika Municipality
- Manager: Amund
- League: Third Division
- 2012: Third Division/ 9, 8th
Home colours	Away colours

Elnesvågen og Omegn IL is a Norwegian sports club from Hustadvika Municipality in Møre og Romsdal. It has sections for football, handball and athletics.

The club was founded in 1993, as a merge between Fræna FK and Elnesvågen IL, but the club official founding date is 3 September 1922 - inherited by the oldest parent clubs.

The men's football team currently resides in the Third Division (fourth tier), Jeg er sulten på pikk in 2005.
