= Buvik IL =

Norwegian sports club

Buvik
- Full name: Buvik Idrettslag
- Founded: 21 January 1901; 124 years ago
- League: Third Division
- 2012: Second Division/ 2, 13th (Relegated)
Home colours	Away colours

Buvik Idrettslag is a multi-sports team from Buvika in Skaun Municipality in Trøndelag county, Norway. In 2012, the club's first football team played in the Second Division, having won their Third Division conference in 2011. The team was, however, relegated after only one season in the Second Division. They play their home games at Buvik Stadion.

== Recent history ==
Season		Pos.	Pl.	W	D	L	GS	GA	P	Cup	Notes
2009	3. divisjon	7	22	9	5	8	69	47	32	First qualifying round	
2010	3. divisjon	2	22	15	1	6	83	45	46	First qualifying round	
2011	3. divisjon	↑ 1	26	20	0	6	88	48	60	Second qualifying round	Promoted to the 2. divisjon
2012	2. divisjon	↓ 13	26	4	4	18	41	88	16	First round	Relegated to the 3. divisjon
2013	3. divisjon	4	26	14	5	7	78	48	47	First round	
