= Salangen IF =

Norwegian sports club

- Full name: Salangen Idrettsforening
- Ground: Idrettsheia, Sjøvegan
- League: Third Division
- 2011: Third Division / 12, 8th
Home colours

Salangen Idrettsforening is a Norwegian alliance sports club from Sjøvegan, Troms. It has sections for association football, Nordic skiing and gymnastics.

The men's football team currently plays in the Third Division, the fourth tier of Norwegian football. It played in the Second Division in 2000, won its Third Division group and was re-promoted in 2001, was relegated in 2002, won its Third Division group and was re-promoted in 2003 and was relegated in 2004.
