= Sunndal Fotball =

Norwegian football club

Sunndal
- Full name: Sunndal Fotball
- Founded: 1992
- Ground: Sande stadion, Sunndalsøra
- Manager: Ole Bjørn Sundgot
- League: 4. divisjon
- 2019: 3. divisjon, group 1, 13th of 14; (relegated)
Home colours

Sunndal Fotball is a Norwegian association football club from Sunndalsøra, Møre og Romsdal.

It was separated from the multi-sports club Sunndal IL (founded 1918) in 1992.

== Men's team ==
The men's football team currently plays in the 4. divisjon, the fifth tier of Norwegian football, since their relegation from 3. divisjon in 2019. It last played in the 2. divisjon in 2000. In 2010 it contested a playoff to win promotion, but failed.

=== Recent seasons ===
Season		Pos.	Pl.	W	D	L	GS	GA	P	Cup	Notes
2017	4. divisjon	3	22	15	1	6	80	41	46	First qualifying round	
2018	4. divisjon	↑ 1	22	14	6	2	68	25	48	First round	Promoted to 3. divisjon
2019	3. divisjon	↓ 13	26	5	5	16	36	67	20	Second round	Relegated to 4. divisjon

== Women's team ==
The women's football team currently plays in the Second Division, the third tier of Norwegian football. In 2010 it contested a playoff to win promotion to the First Division, but failed.
