= Kirkenes IF =

Norwegian sports club

- Full name: Kirkenes Idrettsforening
- Founded: 8 February 1908
- Ground: Kirkenes stadion
- Manager: Kjetil Rist
- League: Third Division
- 2012: Third Division / 12, 4th
Home colours

Kirkenes Idrettsforening is a Norwegian sports club from Kirkenes. It has sections for association football, team handball and orienteering.

It was founded on 8 February 1908. Kirkenes stadion is their home field. Their team colors are blue and white. The men's football team currently plays in the Third Division, the fourth tier of Norwegian football. The target of the team this year is the promotion to Norwegian Second Division. It last played in the Second Division in 1999. After the 2007, 2009 and 2010 season it contested a playoff to win re-promotion, but failed all three times.
