= Korsvoll IL =

Norwegian sports club

- Full name: Korsvoll Idrettslag
- Founded: 5 March 1899
- Ground: Korsvollbanen, Oslo, Norway
- Capacity: 2,000 (200 seated)
- Manager: Stig Mathisen
- League: Third Division
- 2012: Third Division/ 1, 4th
Home colours	Away colours	Third colours

Korsvoll IL is a sports club from Korsvoll in the borough of Nordre Aker in Oslo, Norway. It was founded on 5 March 1899 as a skiing club, and today has sections for football, handball, floorball, and cross-country skiing.

== Football ==
The men's football team plays in the Third Division after being relegated from the Second Division in 2009. Their home field is Korsvollbanen. Korsvoll IL's supporter club was founded in 2005, and is named "Gladlaksene".

In 2005 they beat Elverum in a playoff and was promoted to the Second Division, where they played from 2006 to 2009. In 2010, Korsvoll won their Third Division group, but were defeated by Nesodden in the promotion-playoffs.

One of Korsvoll Fotball's most memorable moment came in the 2007 Norwegian Football Cup match against Stabæk. Korsvoll was down by two goals late in the second half. But a late freekick goal and a stoppage time goal scored on a corner by Korsvoll's goalkeeper Stian Straume sent the game into extra time. However Alanzinho scored three goals and Korsvoll lost the game 2-5 after extra time.
