= IL Skarphedin =

Norwegian sports club

- Full name: Idrettslaget Skarphedin
- Founded: 1891
- Ground: Gullbringbanen
- Manager: Øyvind Haugen
- League: Third Division
- 2011: Third Division/ 5, 2nd
Home colours

Idrettslaget Skarphedin is a Norwegian sports club from Bø i Telemark in Midt-Telemark Municipality. It has sections for alpine skiing, association football, track and field, team handball, cross-country skiing, cycling, swimming, and volleyball. It formerly had sections for ski jumping and gymnastics.

The men's football team currently plays in the Third Division, the fourth tier of Norwegian football. It last played in the Second Division in 2000. After the 2005 season it contested a playoff to win re-promotion, but failed. It again unsuccessfully contested playoffs for promotion to the Second Division in 2010, this time losing 6–2 on aggregate against Mandalskameratene, after winning the Telemark section of the Third Division.
