= Kolstad IL =

Norwegian sports club

- Full name: Kolstad idrettslag
- Founded: 5 October 1972
- Based in: Trondheim, Norway
- Stadium: Kolstad idrettspark (football), Kolstad Arena (handball)
- Colours: Red; White

Kolstad Idrettslag is a Norwegian multi-sports club from Kolstad/Saupstad in Trondheim. It is known for the two main departments of football and handball. The handball team has been playing in the top division of REMA 1000-ligaen since 2015.

== Football department ==
Kolstad Fotball is the football department of Kolstad IL. The men's team currently plays in 3. divisjon, the fourth tier of the Norwegian football league system. Their home ground is Kolstad idrettspark. The team is well-known for being the boyhood club of former Rosenborg players, such as Rosenborg legend Harald Brattbakk and Alexander Tettey.

== Handball department ==
Kolstad Håndball is the handball department of Kolstad IL. The men's team competes in the top division of Norwegian handball, REMA 1000-ligaen. Their home grounds is Kolstad Arena and Trondheim Spektrum, which has a seating capacity of 2,500 and 8,900 spectators.
