= List of SK Brann (women) records and statistics =

SK Brann is a Norwegian football club from Bergen, Norway. The club was founded in 1908 and is one of the most popular in Norway. In 2022 IL Sandviken's women's team was renamed to SK Brann Kvinner, and in 2023 the team were fully merged into Brann.

The list includes major honors won by Brann's women's team, as well as records set by the club and its players.

== Honours ==
=== League ===
- Toppserien:
  - Winners (1): 2022
  - Runners-up (1): 2024

=== Cup ===
- Norwegian Cup:
  - Winners (1): 2022

=== Awards ===
- Toppserien Kit of the Year
  - Winners (1): 2024
- Toppserien Pitch of the Year
  - Winners (1): 2024

== Players ==
All current Brann players are in bold.
All stats accurate as of the end of the 2024 season.

=== Appearances ===
- Youngest first-team player: **Heidi Halbmayr** – 15 years, 324 days (against Avaldsnes, Norwegian Cup, 12 June 2024)
- Oldest first-team player: Ingrid Ryland – 33 years, 160 days (against Stabæk, Norwegian Cup, 5 November 2022)
- Most consecutive league appearances: **42** – **Marthine Østenstad**, 3 June 2023 – 9 November 2024

=== Most appearances ===
Competitive matches only, appearances as a substitute in brackets.

Players with most appearances for SK Brann
Rank	Player	Years	League	Cup	Europe	Total
1	(Norway) Rakel Engesvik	2022–2024	72 (26)	10 (5)	14 (2)	**96** (33)
2	(Norway) Aurora Mikalsen	2022–2024	73 (0)	5 (0)	16 (0)	**94** (0)
3	(Norway) **Marthine Østenstad**	2022–present	71 (6)	9 (1)	13 (0)	**93** (7)
4	(Norway) **Ingrid Stenevik**	2022–present	64 (11)	11 (1)	16 (3)	**91** (15)
5	(Norway) **Nora Lie Eghdami**	2022–present	63 (21)	11 (3)	14 (9)	**88** (33)
6	(Norway) Marit Bratberg Lund	2022–2024	61 (14)	9 (0)	16 (0)	**86** (14)
7	(Norway) **Signe Gaupset**	2022–present	54 (11)	10 (5)	13 (1)	**77** (17)
8	(Norway) **Karoline Haugland**	2023–present	51 (9)	6 (1)	12 (1)	**69** (11)
9	(Norway) **Cecilie Redisch Kvamme**	2022–present	49 (2)	6 (1)	12 (2)	**67** (5)
10	(Norway) Maria Brochmann	2022–2023	42 (22)	8 (6)	9 (5)	**59** (33)

=== Goalscorers ===
- Most goals in a season in all competitions: **19** – **Anna Aahjem**, 2024
- Most league goals in a season: **18** – **Anna Aahjem**, 2024 Toppserien
- Top league scorer with fewest goals in a season: **10** – Elisabeth Terland, 2022 Toppserien
- Most goals scored in a match: **4** – Therese Åsland v Loddefjord, 18 May 2022
- Goals in consecutive league matches: **4** consecutive matches – Elisabeth Terland, 15 May 2022 to 29 May 2022
- Most hat-tricks: **2** – Maria Brochmann (18 May 2022 – 6 September 2023)

=== Most goals ===
Competitive matches only. Matches played (including as a substitute) appear in brackets.

Top goalscorers for SK Brann
Rank	Player	Years	League	Cup	Europe	Total
1	(Norway) Maria Brochmann	2022–2023	13 (42)	11 (8)	6 (9)	**30** (59)
2	(Norway) Rakel Engesvik	2022–2024	20 (72)	2 (10)	4 (14)	**26** (96)
3	(Norway) Marit Bratberg Lund	2022–2024	19 (61)	2 (9)	1 (16)	**22** (86)
4	(Norway) **Anna Aahjem**	2024–present	18 (27)	1 (4)	0 (2)	**19** (33)
4	(Norway) **Amalie Eikeland**	2023–present	15 (37)	2 (4)	2 (12)	**19** (51)
6	(Norway) **Nora Lie Eghdami**	2022–present	11 (63)	6 (11)	1 (14)	**18** (88)
7	(Norway) **Signe Gaupset**	2022–present	9 (54)	4 (10)	1 (13)	**14** (77)
8	(Norway) **Karoline Haugland**	2023–present	6 (51)	4 (6)	1 (12)	**11** (69)
8	(Sweden) **Johanna Renmark**	2023–present	9 (35)	1 (5)	1 (11)	**11** (51)
8	(Norway) **Marthine Østenstad**	2022–present	8 (71)	2 (9)	1 (13)	**11** (93)

=== Individual awards ===
Toppserien Player of the Year

- (Norway) Tuva Hansen – 2022

Bataljonen's Brann Player of the Year

- (Norway) Marit Bratberg Lund – 2023
- (Norway) **Anna Aahjem** – 2024

Bataljonen's Young Brann Player of the Year

- (Norway) Justine Kielland – 2023
- (Norway) **Signe Gaupset** – 2024

=== International ===
First international:

- (Australia) Tameka Yallop against Indonesia (21 January 2022)

Most international caps (total):

- (Australia) Tameka Yallop – **130**

Most international caps as a Brann player

- (Norway) Aurora Mikalsen – **21**

== Team records ==
=== Matches ===
- First match: 1–0 v Åsane, 22 January 2022
- First Toppserien match: 5–2 v Røa, 20 March 2022
- First Norwegian Cup match: 12–0 v Loddefjord, 18 May 2022
- First match at Brann Stadion: 1–0 v Vålerenga, 5 June 202
- First European match: 1–0 v ALG Spor, 18 August 2022

==== Record wins ====
- Record win: 12–0 v Loddefjord, Norwegian Cup, 18 May 2022
- Record league win: 10–0
  - v Avaldsnes, Toppserien, 15 May 2022
  - v Arna-Bjørnar, Toppserien, 11 May 2024
- Record European win: 5–0 v Lokomotiv Stara Zagora, Champions League first qualifying round, semi-final, 6 September 2023
- Record home win: 10–0 v Avaldsnes, Toppserien, 15 May 2022
- Record away win: 12–0 v Loddefjord, Norwegian Cup, 18 May 2022

==== Record defeats ====
- Record defeat: 1–4 v Rosenborg, Toppserien, 14 May 2023
- Record Norwegian Football Cup defeat: 1-3

v LSK Kvinner, 29 August 2023
v Vålerenga, 29 September 2024

- Record European defeat: 1-3

v Rosengård, 28 September 2022
v Olympique Lyonnais, 13 December 2023
v Barcelona, 28 March 2024

==== Streaks ====
- Longest winning streak (all competitions): 7 matches, 20 March 2022 to 1 May 2022
- Longest unbeaten streak (all competitions): 14 matches, 20 March 2022 to 5 June 2022
- Longest winless streak (all competitions): 3 matches
  - 17 September 2022 to 28 September 2022
  - 15 April 2023 to 23 April 2023
  - 2 May 2023 to 14 May 2023
  - 3 June 2023 to 10 June 2023
  - 16 March 2024 to 28 March 2024
- Longest losing streak (all competitions): 3 matches
  - 2 May 2023 to 14 May 2023
  - 16 March 2024 to 28 March 2024
- Longest winning streak (league): 8 matches, 24 August 2024 to 19 October 2024
- Longest unbeaten streak (league): 14 matches, 3 August 2022 to 19 April 2023
- Longest drawing streak (league): 2 matches
  - 13 August 2022 to 28 August 2022
  - 15 April 2023 to 19 April 2023
  - 6 June 2023 to 10 June 2023
- Longest winless streak (league): 4 matches, 4 November 2023 to 16 March 2024
- Longest losing streak (league): 3 matches, 2 May 2023 to 14 May 2023
- Longest scoring streak (league): 13 matches
  - 20 March 2022 to 5 June 2022
  - 14 October 2023 to 20 May 2024
- Longest non-scoring streak (league): 2 matches
  - 15 April 2023 to 19 April 2023
  - 3 June 2023 to 6 June 2023
- Longest clean sheet streak (league): 7 matches
  - 26 August 2023 to 22 October 2023
  - 24 August 2024 to 12 October 2024
- Longest goal conceding streak (league): 6 matches, 15 June 2024 to 17 August 2024

==== Wins/draws/defeats in a season ====
- Most wins in a league season: 19 – 2024
- Most draws in a league season: 7 – 2023
- Most defeats in a league season: 7 – 2023, 2024
- Fewest wins in a league season: 13 – 2023
- Fewest draws in a league season: 1 – 2024
- Fewest defeats in a league season: 1 – 2022

=== Goals ===
- Most league goals scored in a season: 70 – 2024
- Fewest league goals scored in a season: 52 – 2023
- Most league goals conceded in a season: 30 – 2023
- Fewest league goals conceded in a season: 17 – 2022

=== Points ===
- Most points in a season: 58 — 2024
- Fewest points in a season: 46 — 2023

=== Attendances ===
- Highest home game attendance: 10,582 v Vålerenga, 5 June 2022
- Highest away game attendance: 11,636 v Rosenborg, 12 June 2022
- Highest season average attendance (league): 2,273 (2024)
- Lowest season average attendance (league): 1,076 (2023)
- Seasons with highest average league attendance in Norway: 3 (2022, 2023, 2024)
