= Marthine Østenstad =

Norwegian footballer (born 2001)

Personal information
- Date of birth: 18 March 2001 (age 25)
- Height: 1.78 m (5 ft 10 in)
- Position: Defender

Team information
- Current team: Eintracht Frankfurt
- Number: 14

Youth career
- 2014: Madla
- 2015–2018: Viking
- 2019: Klepp

Senior career*
| Years | Team | Apps | (Gls) |
| 2017–2018 | Viking | 13 | (8) |
| 2018–2020 | Klepp | 43 | (3) |
| 2018 | Klepp 2 | 4 | (0) |
| 2021–2025 | Brann | 101 | (9) |
| 2025– | Eintracht Frankfurt | 19 | (1) |

International career^{‡}
| 2016 | Norway U15 | 3 | (0) |
| 2017 | Norway U16 | 11 | (2) |
| 2018 | Norway U17 | 7 | (1) |
| 2018–2020 | Norway U19 | 20 | (1) |
| 2021–2023 | Norway U23 | 9 | (0) |
| 2023– | Norway | 8 | (1) |
- * Club domestic league appearances and goals as of 21 November 2026 ‡ National team caps and goals as of 14 October 2026

Marthine Østenstad (born 18 March 2001) is a Norwegian professional footballer who plays as a defender for Bundesliga club Eintracht Frankfurt. She has also been capped for Norway, following in the footsteps of her father Egil Østenstad.

== International career ==
On 25 June 2025, Guro Bergsvand withdrew from the Norwegian squad for the UEFA Women's Euro 2025 due to injury, and was replaced by Østenstad.

== Career statistics ==
=== Club ===
As of 21 November 2026.

| Club | Season | League | | | National Cup (Note: Includes Norwegian Women's Cup, DFB-Pokal Frauen) | | Continental | | Total | |
| Club | Season | Division | Apps | Goals | Apps | Goals | Apps | Goals | Apps | Goals |
|---|---|---|---|---|---|---|---|---|---|---|
| Viking | 2017 | Third Division | 7 | 5 | — | | — | | 7 | 5 |
| Viking | 2018 | Third Division | 6 | 3 | — | | — | | 6 | 3 |
| Viking | Total | | 13 | 8 | — | | — | | 13 | 8 |
| Klepp 2 | 2018 | Second Division | 4 | 0 | — | | — | | 4 | 0 |
| Klepp | 2018 | Toppserien | 4 | 0 | 0 | 0 | — | | 4 | 0 |
| Klepp | 2019 | Toppserien | 21 | 1 | 2 | 1 | — | | 23 | 2 |
| Klepp | 2020 | Toppserien | 18 | 2 | 0 | 0 | — | | 18 | 2 |
| Klepp | Total | | 43 | 3 | 2 | 1 | — | | 45 | 4 |
| Brann | 2021 | Toppserien | 18 | 1 | 5 | 1 | — | | 23 | 2 |
| Brann | 2022 | Toppserien | 19 | 1 | 3 | 0 | 3 | 0 | 25 | 1 |
| Brann | 2023 | Toppserien | 26 | 3 | 2 | 1 | 8 | 1 | 36 | 5 |
| Brann | 2024 | Toppserien | 26 | 4 | 4 | 1 | 2 | 0 | 32 | 5 |
| Brann | 2025 | Toppserien | 12 | 0 | 0 | 0 | 0 | 0 | 12 | 0 |
| Brann | Total | | 101 | 9 | 14 | 3 | 13 | 1 | 128 | 13 |
| Eintracht Frankfurt | 2025–26 | Bundesliga | 8 | 0 | 0 | 0 | 1 | 0 (Note: appearances in UEFA Women's Europa Cup) | 9 | 0 |
| Eintracht Frankfurt | 2026–27 | Bundesliga | 11 | 1 | 2 | 0 | 6 | 0 (Note: Four appearances in UEFA Women's Champions League qualifying rounds and two appearance in the UEFA Women's Europa Cup) | 18 | 1 |
| Eintracht Frankfurt | Total | | 19 | 1 | 2 | 0 | 7 | 0 | 28 | 1 |
| Career total | | | 180 | 21 | 18 | 4 | 20 | 1 | 218 | 26 |

=== International ===
As of match played 13 October 2026

Scores and results list Norway's goal tally first, score column indicates score after each Østenstad goal.

List of international goals scored by Marthine Østenstad
| No. | Date | Venue | Cap | Opponent | Score | Result | Competition |
|---|---|---|---|---|---|---|---|
| 1 | 13 October 2026 | Ullevaal Stadion, Oslo, Norway | 8 | Romania | 5–0 | 6–0 | 2027 FIFA Women's World Cup play-offs |
