= Lisa Naalsund =

Norwegian footballer (born 1995)

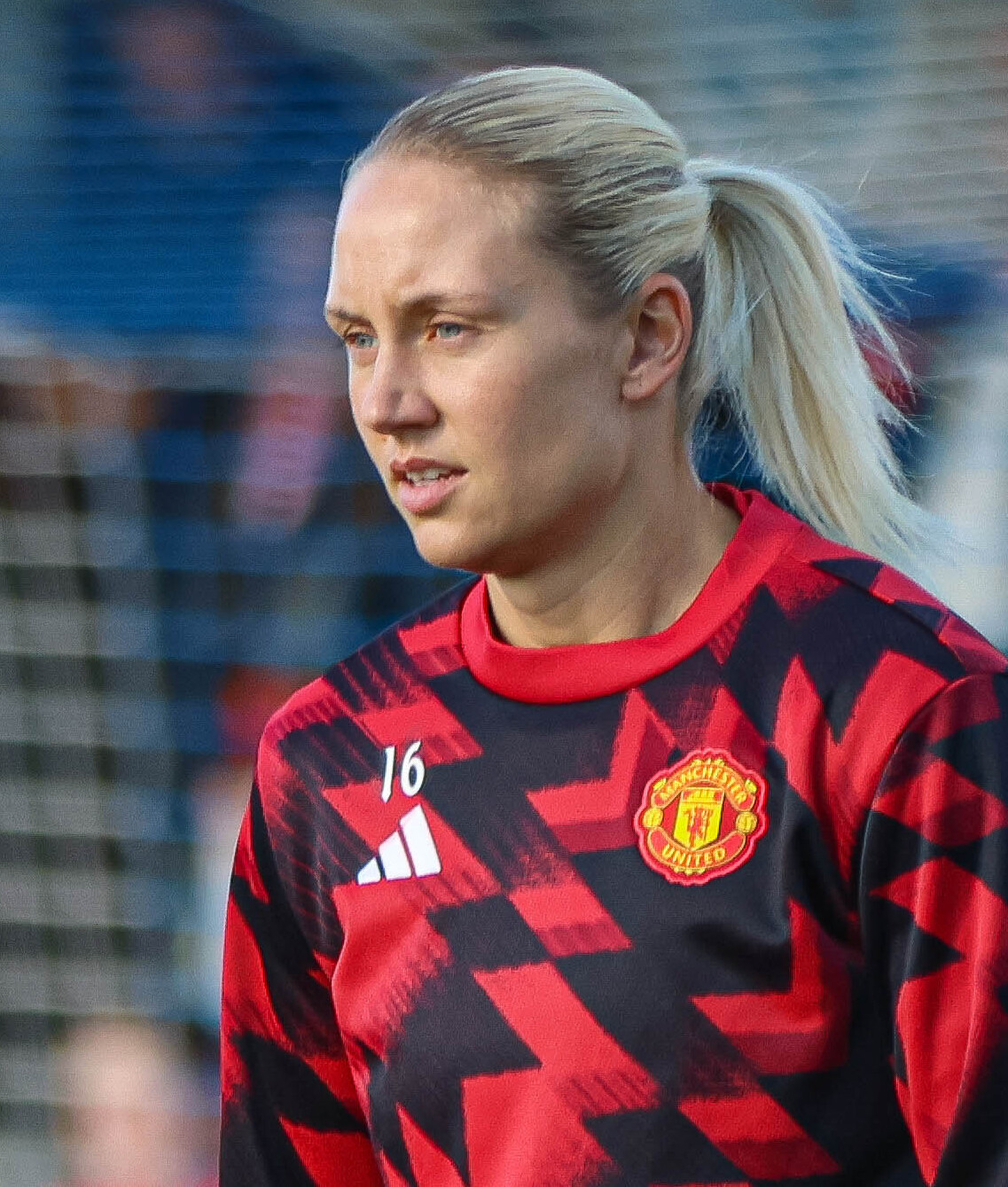
- Naalsund with Manchester United in 2025

Personal information
- Full name: Lisa Fjeldstad Naalsund
- Date of birth: 11 June 1995 (age 31)
- Place of birth: Bergen, Norway
- Height: 1.69 m (5 ft 7 in)
- Position: Midfielder

Team information
- Current team: Birmingham City
- Number: 8

Youth career
- 2002–2011: Tertnes
- 2012: Arna-Bjørnar

Senior career*
Years	Team	Apps	(Gls)
2012–2018	Arna-Bjørnar	139	(33)
2019–2022	Brann	77	(14)
2023–2026	Manchester United	42	(5)
2026–	Birmingham City	5	(0)

International career^{‡}
2010	Norway U15	3	(0)
2011	Norway U16	9	(2)
2011–2012	Norway U17	8	(0)
2012–2014	Norway U19	29	(2)
2015–2019	Norway U23	16	(1)
2021–	Norway	41	(2)
- * Club domestic league appearances and goals as of 4 October 2026 ‡ National team caps and goals as of 14 October 2026

Lisa Fjeldstad Naalsund (Norwegian: [ˈliːsa ˈfjɛlstad ˈnɔːlsʉn]; born 11 June 1995) is a Norwegian professional footballer who plays as a midfielder for English Women's Super League club Birmingham City and the Norway national team.

== Club career ==
=== Arna-Bjørnar ===
Naalsund began playing football at the age of 6 for local club Tertnes. She also played handball until secondary school. Ahead of the 2012 season, she joined Arna-Bjørnar. On 14 April 2012, Naalsund made her senior debut for the club when she started the season opener, a 1–1 draw with Røa IL. She played 67 minutes before being substituted for fellow offseason arrival Vilde Bøe Risa, also making her senior debut. She scored her first senior goal on 9 June 2012 during a 2–0 win over Klepp IL. In her first season with the club, Naalsund played in all 22 Toppserien matches including 18 starts and scored four goals. During her first three seasons, Naalsund played in all but one league match as Arna-Bjørnar finished third in all three seasons, equalling the team's record highest finish position. In seven years, Naalsund was a mainstay of Arna-Bjørnar and made 157 appearances in all competitions.

=== Sandviken/Brann ===
Ahead of the 2019 season, Naalsund signed for Sandviken (rebranded Brann in 2022). In 2020, Naalsund made 18 league appearances as she was named to the Toppserien Team of the Year. Having previously recorded a team-record best 4th-place finish the previous three seasons in a row, Sandviken won the 2021 Toppserien league title for the first time. Naalsund was once again named to the team of the season having made 18 appearances and scored five goals. In 2022, the team defended their league title and also won the Norwegian Women's Cup for the first time.

=== Manchester United ===
On 24 January 2023, Naalsund signed for English Women's Super League club Manchester United on a three-and-a-half-year contract. Having joined while working through fitness issues, Naalsund had to wait until 19 March 2023 to make her debut, starting in an FA Cup quarter-final against second division team Lewes. She started the game but was substituted off after 25 minutes with a hamstring problem. She scored her first goal for the club during a UEFA Women's Champions League qualifying match against Paris Saint-Germain on 18 October 2023.

=== Birmingham City ===
On 15 July 2026, it was announced that Naalsund had signed for newly promoted WSL club Birmingham City on a reported three-year contract.

== International career ==
=== Youth ===
Naalsund first represented Norway at under-15 level in 2010. She continued to progress as a youth international, participating in 2012 UEFA Under-17 Championship qualification and attended her first tournament finals stage at the 2013 UEFA Under-19 Championship. The following year she was recalled to the squad as Norway hosted the 2014 UEFA Under-19 Championship.

=== Senior ===
In November 2017, Naalsund received her first senior international call-up for Norway for a friendly against Canada but was an unused substitute.

Having yet to be capped, Naalsund was named as an injury replacement for Emilie Haavi for the 2019 FIFA World Cup. However, due to squad regulations, Naalsund could not be registered and had to remain a training player ineligible to play in the tournament.

Naalsund made her senior international debut for the Norway on 10 June 2021, coming on as an 80th-minute substitute for Vilde Bøe Risa in a friendly 1–0 loss against Sweden.

On 7 June 2022, Naalsund was named to the squad for UEFA Euro 2022. However, she suffered a leg injury during a pre-tournament friendly against New Zealand on 25 June and was replaced by Thea Bjelde.

On 16 June 2025, Naalsund was called up to the Norway squad for the UEFA Euro 2025.

== Personal life ==
On 18 June 2026, she got engaged to Manchester United and Birmingham City teammate Millie Turner.

== Career statistics ==
=== Club ===
As of match played 4 October 2026

Appearances and goals by club, season and competition
Club	Season	League			National cup (Note: Includes Norwegian Cup and FA Cup)		League cup (Note: Includes FA Women's League Cup)		Continental (Note: UEFA Women's Champions League)		Total	
Club	Season	Division	Apps	Goals	Apps	Goals	Apps	Goals	Apps	Goals	Apps	Goals
Arna-Bjørnar	2012	Toppserien	22	4	4	0	—		—		26	4
Arna-Bjørnar	2013	Toppserien	21	1	3	0	—		—		24	1
Arna-Bjørnar	2014	Toppserien	22	6	2	0	—		—		24	6
Arna-Bjørnar	2015	Toppserien	10	4	1	0	—		—		11	4
Arna-Bjørnar	2016	Toppserien	21	7	2	1	—		—		23	8
Arna-Bjørnar	2017	Toppserien	21	4	3	0	—		—		24	4
Arna-Bjørnar	2018	Toppserien	22	7	3	1	—		—		25	8
Arna-Bjørnar	Total		139	33	18	2	0	0	0	0	157	35
Brann	2019	Toppserien	22	5	2	3	—		—		24	8
Brann	2020	Toppserien	18	3	3	1	—		—		21	4
Brann	2021	Toppserien	18	5	5	0	—		—		23	5
Brann	2022	Toppserien	19	1	5	0	—		4	0	28	1
Brann	Total		77	14	15	4	0	0	4	0	96	18
Manchester United	2022–23	WSL	1	0	1	0	0	0	—		2	0
Manchester United	2023–24	WSL	17	2	4	1	4	1	2	1	27	5
Manchester United	2024–25	WSL	8	0	2	0	1	0	—		11	0
Manchester United	2025–26	WSL	16	3	2	0	3	0	13	0	34	3
Manchester United	Total		42	5	9	1	8	1	15	1	74	8
Birmingham City	2026–27	Women's Super League	5	0	0	0	1	0	—		6	0
Career total			263	52	42	7	9	1	19	1	333	61

=== International ===
As of match played 13 October 2026

Appearances and goals by national team and year
National team	Year	Apps	Goals
Norway	2021	3	0
Norway	2022	6	0
Norway	2023	5	0
Norway	2024	9	1
Norway	2025	10	0
Norway	2026	8	1
Total		41	2

Scores and results list Norway's goal tally first, score column indicates score after each Naalsund goal.

List of international goals scored by Lisa Naalsund
No.	Date	Cap	Venue	Opponent	Score	Result	Competition
1	29 October 2024	23	Ullevaal Stadion, Oslo, Norway	Albania	2–0	9–0	UEFA Women's Euro 2025 qualifying play-offs
2	3 March 2026	34	Datenpol Arena, Maria Enzersdorf, Austria	Austria	1–0	1–0	2027 FIFA World Cup qualification

== Honours ==
Sandviken/Brann

- Toppserien: 2021, 2022
- Norwegian Women's Cup: 2022

Manchester United

- Women's FA Cup: 2023–24; runner-up: 2022–23, 2024–25
- Women's League Cup runner-up: 2025–26

Individual

- Toppserien Team of the Year: 2020, 2021
