= Karoline Haugland =

Norwegian footballer (born 1998)

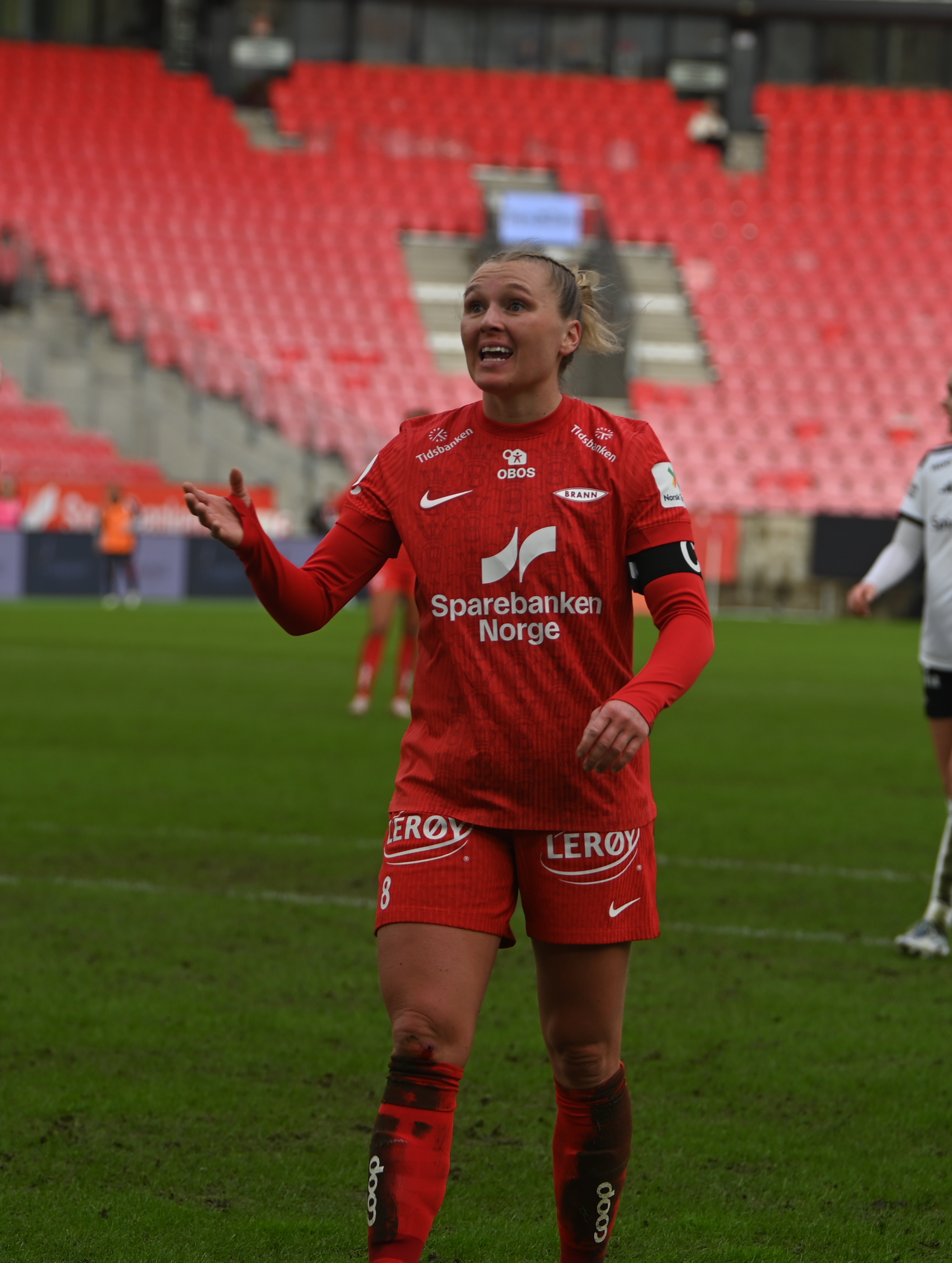

Personal information
- Full name: Karoline Heimvik Haugland
- Date of birth: 28 February 1998 (age 28)
- Place of birth: Norway
- Height: 1.65 m (5 ft 5 in)
- Position: Midfielder

Team information
- Current team: Brann
- Number: 8

Youth career
- 2012–2017: Arna-Bjørnar

Senior career*
Years	Team	Apps	(Gls)
2013	Arna-Bjørnar 3	3	(2)
2013–2019	Arna-Bjørnar 2	31	(10)
2014–2022	Arna-Bjørnar	138	(13)
2023–	Brann	69	(7)

International career^{‡}
2013	Norway U15	2	(0)
2013–2014	Norway U16	15	(2)
2013–2015	Norway U17	4	(3)
2014–2017	Norway U19	31	(2)
2018	Norway U23	4	(0)
- * Club domestic league appearances and goals as of 6 September 2025 ‡ National team caps and goals as of 20 October 2024

Karoline Heimvik Haugland (born 28 February 1998) is a Norwegian professional footballer who plays as a midfielder for Toppserien club Brann.

== Career statistics ==
=== Club ===
As of 19 October 2024.

Club	Season	League			Norwegian Cup		Champions League		Total	
Club	Season	Division	Apps	Goals	Apps	Goals	Apps	Goals	Apps	Goals
Arna-Bjørnar 3	2017	Third Division	3	2	—		—		3	2
Arna-Bjørnar 2	2013	Second Division	14	3	—		—		14	3
Arna-Bjørnar 2	2014	Second Division	6	2	—		—		6	2
Arna-Bjørnar 2	2016	Second Division	1	1	—		—		1	1
Arna-Bjørnar 2	2017	Second Division	4	3	—		—		4	3
Arna-Bjørnar 2	2018	Second Division	3	0	—		—		3	0
Arna-Bjørnar 2	2019	Second Division	3	1	—		—		3	1
Arna-Bjørnar 2	Total		31	10	—		—		31	10
Arna-Bjørnar	2014	Toppserien	19	3	2	0	—		21	3
Arna-Bjørnar	2015	Toppserien	21	1	2	0	—		23	1
Arna-Bjørnar	2016	Toppserien	19	1	2	0	—		21	1
Arna-Bjørnar	2017	Toppserien	18	2	4	0	—		22	2
Arna-Bjørnar	2018	Toppserien	21	1	3	0	—		24	0
Arna-Bjørnar	2019	Toppserien	2	0	1	1	—		3	1
Arna-Bjørnar	2020	Toppserien	2	0	0	0	—		2	0
Arna-Bjørnar	2021	Toppserien	11	1	1	1	—		12	2
Arna-Bjørnar	2022	Toppserien	8	2	2	0	—		10	2
Arna-Bjørnar	Total		121	11	17	2	—		138	13
Brann	2023	Toppserien	25	3	3	2	8	1	36	6
Brann	2024	Toppserien	23	3	3	2	4	0	30	5
Brann	Total		48	6	6	4	12	1	66	11
Career total			203	29	23	6	12	1	238	36
