= Rakel Engesvik =

Norwegian footballer (born 1998)

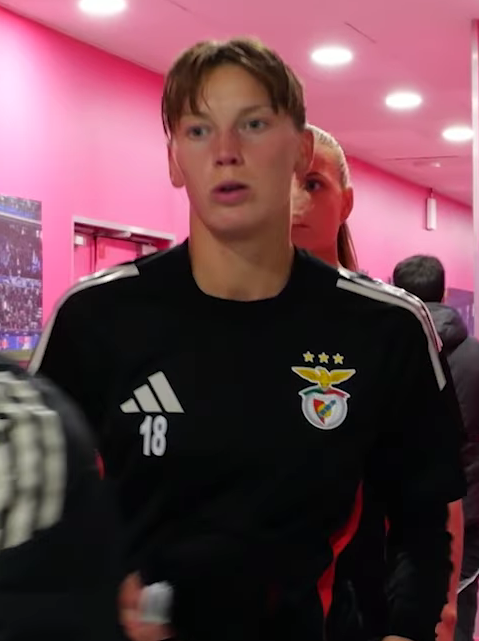
- Engesvik with Benfica in 2025

Personal information
- Full name: Rakel Engesvik
- Date of birth: 23 September 1998 (age 28)
- Place of birth: Verdal, Norway
- Height: 1.75 m (5 ft 9 in)
- Position: Forward

Team information
- Current team: Brøndby
- Number: 19

Youth career
- 2013–2014: Verdal
- 2015–2016: Rosenborg

Senior career*
Years	Team	Apps	(Gls)
2013–2014	Verdal	19	(8)
2015–2018	Rosenborg 2	20	(11)
2016–2020	Rosenborg	75	(14)
2020–2024	Brann	93	(26)
2025–2026	Benfica	0	(0)
2026-	Brøndby	0	(0)

International career^{‡}
2019–2023	Norway U23	13	(0)
- * Club domestic league appearances and goals as of 19 October 2024 ‡ National team caps and goals as of 19 October 2024

Rakel Engesvik (born 23 September 1998) is a Norwegian professional footballer who plays as a forward for A-Liga club Brøndby.

== Career statistics ==
=== Club ===
As of 19 October 2024.

Club	Season	League			Norwegian Cup		Champions League		Total	
Club	Season	Division	Apps	Goals	Apps	Goals	Apps	Goals	Apps	Goals
Verdal	2013	Third Division	2	2	—		—		2	2
Verdal	2014	Second Division	17	6	—		—		17	6
Verdal	Total		19	8	—		—		19	8
Rosenborg 2	2015	Second Division	11	6	—		—		11	6
Rosenborg 2	2016	Second Division	8	5	—		—		8	5
Rosenborg 2	2018	Second Division	1	0	—		—		1	0
Rosenborg 2	Total		20	11	—		—		20	11
Rosenborg	2016	Toppserien	6	1	1	0	—		7	1
Rosenborg	2017	Toppserien	22	8	2	1	—		24	9
Rosenborg	2018	Toppserien	22	1	1	0	—		23	1
Rosenborg	2019	Toppserien	15	2	3	1	—		18	3
Rosenborg	2020	Toppserien	3	0	0	0	—		3	0
Rosenborg	Total		68	12	7	2	—		75	14
Brann	2020	Toppserien	5	2	3	2	—		8	4
Brann	2021	Toppserien	8	1	4	0	—		12	1
Brann	2022	Toppserien	20	5	4	2	2	1	26	8
Brann	2023	Toppserien	26	7	3	0	8	3	37	10
Brann	2024	Toppserien	23	8	3	0	4	0	30	8
Brann	Total		82	23	17	4	14	4	113	31
Career total			189	54	24	6	14	4	227	64
