= 2023 Norwegian Second Division (women) =

Norwegian football season

Norwegian Second Division
- Season: 2023
- Dates: 14 April – 12 November
- Champions: Viking (Group 1); Odd (Group 2)
- Promoted: Viking; Odd
- Relegated: Avaldsnes 2 Herd; Tynset; Bossmo/Ytteren
- Matches: 364
- Goals: 1,257 (3.45 per match)

The 2023 Norwegian Second Division was a third-tier Norwegian women's football league season. The league consisted of 28 teams divided into two groups of 14 teams. The season started on 14 April 2023 and ended on 12 November 2023.

== Group 1 ==
=== League table ===
Pos	Team	Pld	W	D	L	GF	GA	GD	Pts	Promotion or relegation
1	Viking (C, P)	26	23	2	1	83	11	+72	71	Promotion to First Division
2	Molde	26	19	3	4	75	29	+46	60	
3	Tiller	26	14	6	6	50	23	+27	48	
4	Bryne	26	13	7	6	39	30	+9	46	
5	Rosenborg 2	26	13	4	9	48	41	+7	43	
6	Vålerenga 2	26	12	0	14	35	46	−11	36	
7	Frigg	26	10	4	12	52	51	+1	34	
8	Haugesund	26	9	6	11	32	33	−1	33	
9	Arendal	26	9	6	11	28	35	−7	33	
10	Sogndal	26	8	7	11	29	33	−4	31	
11	Avaldsnes 2 (Note: Avaldsnes 2 were relegated due to the relegation of Avaldsnes from the 2023 Toppserien. Sarpsborg 08 were spared from relegation in group 2.) (R)	26	7	5	14	23	49	−26	26	Relegation to Third Division
12	Amazon Grimstad	26	5	6	15	17	40	−23	21	
13	Herd (R)	26	3	7	16	20	58	−38	16	Relegation to Third Division
14	Tynset (R)	26	4	3	19	24	76	−52	15	Relegation to Third Division

Source: NFF (in Norwegian)
Rules for classification: 1) Points; 2) Goal difference; 3) Goals scored; 4) Head-to-head points; 5) Head-to-head goal difference; 6) Head-to-head goals scored.
(C) Champions; (P) Promoted; (R) Relegated

=== Results ===
Home \ Away	AMA	ARE	AVA	BRY	FRI	HAU	HER	MOL	ROS	SOG	TIL	TYN	VIK	VÅL
Amazon Grimstad	—	1–0	1–0	1–0	1–2	1–1	1–1	0–5	4–0	0–0	0–0	0–0	0–1	1–0
Arendal	1–1	—	1–0	1–2	3–4	0–1	0–0	1–0	3–0	1–1	1–0	4–1	1–2	3–0
Avaldsnes 2	2–0	0–1	—	1–0	2–0	0–2	1–1	3–2	1–1	1–0	2–2	0–3	1–4	1–0
Bryne	3–2	3–0	3–0	—	5–2	1–0	4–1	2–2	0–3	1–1	0–0	3–0	0–7	3–0
Frigg	2–1	2–3	5–0	2–4	—	0–0	2–2	1–3	0–1	2–0	1–5	6–1	0–3	0–1
Haugesund	1–0	1–1	1–1	0–0	2–1	—	3–0	0–3	1–2	2–1	0–1	5–2	0–4	1–2
Herd	2–0	1–0	2–0	0–0	1–3	0–0	—	1–5	1–1	1–3	0–5	0–1	1–4	0–1
Molde	4–1	4–0	7–0	4–1	2–1	2–0	5–2	—	4–0	2–1	2–1	5–1	2–0	2–1
Rosenborg 2	1–0	6–1	3–1	0–0	2–3	2–3	3–0	4–2	—	0–2	3–1	4–2	0–1	5–1
Sogndal	2–0	1–2	1–1	0–0	3–3	3–1	2–0	1–1	0–1	—	0–2	2–1	0–5	1–2
Tiller	2–1	0–0	2–0	0–1	1–1	3–1	4–0	3–0	0–4	1–0	—	3–0	0–0	5–0
Tynset	1–0	0–0	1–5	0–1	2–5	0–6	4–1	1–3	1–1	1–2	0–6	—	0–4	1–4
Viking	3–0	3–0	4–0	2–0	2–1	1–0	4–1	2–2	4–1	2–1	6–0	4–0	—	6–0
Vålerenga 2	6–0	1–0	2–0	1–2	1–3	2–0	2–1	1–2	5–0	0–1	0–3	2–0	0–5	—

Source: Norwegian Football Federation
Legend: Blue = home team win; Yellow = draw; Red = away team win.

== Group 2 ==
=== League table ===
Pos	Team	Pld	W	D	L	GF	GA	GD	Pts	Promotion or relegation
1	Odd (C, P)	26	22	3	1	87	15	+72	69	Promotion to First Division
2	HamKam	26	21	2	3	75	17	+58	65	
3	KFUM	26	15	2	9	54	30	+24	47	
4	LSK Kvinner 2	26	13	7	6	63	47	+16	46	
5	Kongsvinger	26	14	1	11	61	38	+23	43	
6	Lyn 2	26	12	5	9	46	34	+12	41	
7	Stabæk 2	26	12	4	10	52	46	+6	40	
8	Bjørnevatn	26	10	3	13	40	49	−9	33	
9	Porsanger	26	9	4	13	44	56	−12	31	
10	Medkila	26	9	3	14	40	51	−11	30	
11	Mjølner	26	7	4	15	44	91	−47	25	
12	Nanset	26	6	3	17	38	65	−27	21	
13	Sarpsborg 08	26	3	6	17	32	81	−49	15	
14	Bossmo/Ytteren (R)	26	4	3	19	26	82	−56	15	Relegation to Third Division

Source: NFF (in Norwegian)
Rules for classification: 1) Points; 2) Goal difference; 3) Goals scored; 4) Head-to-head points; 5) Head-to-head goal difference; 6) Head-to-head goals scored.
(C) Champions; (P) Promoted; (R) Relegated

=== Results ===
Home \ Away	BJØ	BOS	HAM	KFU	KON	LSK	LYN	MED	MJØ	NAN	ODD	POR	SAR	STA
Bjørnevatn	—	5–0	1–3	0–2	2–0	1–2	2–0	1–0	0–4	1–2	0–3	1–0	6–0	2–2
Bossmo/Ytteren	0–3	—	0–6	1–4	1–1	0–2	0–1	2–1	2–3	1–3	1–4	1–4	4–1	3–1
HamKam	6–1	1–1	—	2–1	3–0	8–1	0–0	1–0	6–0	5–0	1–3	4–1	2–0	4–1
KFUM	3–0	3–0	1–3	—	3–2	1–1	0–2	3–1	6–0	5–2	0–1	6–1	1–0	1–2
Kongsvinger	7–1	3–1	1–2	0–1	—	3–2	2–1	7–0	7–0	3–1	0–4	4–0	4–1	1–2
LSK Kvinner 2	1–0	7–0	2–3	1–2	3–1	—	1–4	4–1	4–2	4–0	1–1	3–2	4–2	1–4
Lyn 2	3–0	7–0	0–1	2–1	3–1	2–2	—	1–1	4–1	4–0	0–3	1–0	1–1	1–3
Medkila	0–1	2–2	1–0	0–3	0–1	2–2	3–0	—	7–0	5–0	0–2	1–2	2–1	4–2
Mjølner	2–2	1–2	1–5	1–0	2–5	1–1	3–0	1–2	—	4–2	0–7	3–2	4–1	2–4
Nanset	1–0	3–1	0–1	1–1	0–1	1–3	1–3	1–3	3–3	—	2–5	2–3	4–0	5–1
Odd	5–2	6–0	0–2	5–0	3–0	2–2	2–0	6–0	8–1	2–1	—	3–0	5–0	2–0
Porsanger	1–2	2–0	0–3	1–0	0–3	2–3	3–1	1–3	3–1	4–2	1–1	—	6–3	1–1
Sarpsborg 08	1–5	4–3	0–3	0–4	0–4	2–2	3–3	1–0	3–3	1–1	1–2	2–2	—	4–2
Stabæk 2	1–1	4–0	1–0	1–2	2–0	0–4	0–2	6–1	5–1	1–0	0–2	2–2	4–0	—

Source: Norwegian Football Federation
Legend: Blue = home team win; Yellow = draw; Red = away team win.
