= Karina Sævik =

Norwegian footballer (born 1996)

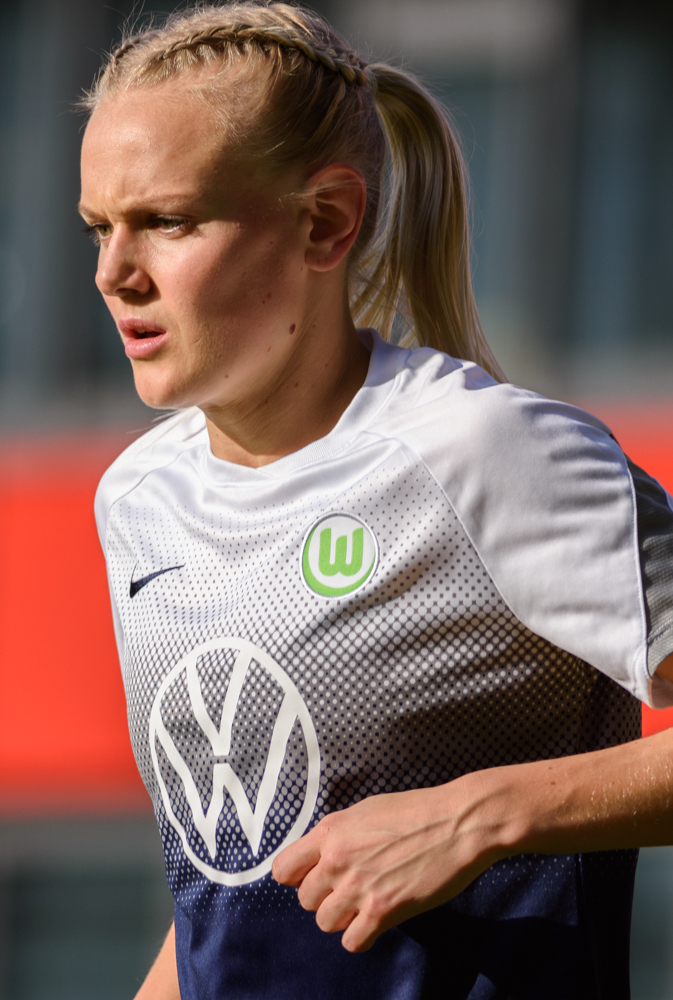
- Sævik with VfL Wolfsburg in 2020

Personal information
- Date of birth: 24 March 1996 (age 30)
- Place of birth: Kopervik, Karmøy Municipality, Norway
- Height: 1.73 m (5 ft 8 in)
- Positions: Attacking midfielder; winger

Team information
- Current team: Vålerenga
- Number: 21

Youth career
- Kopervik
- Haugar

Senior career*
Years	Team	Apps	(Gls)
2011–2012	Haugar		
2013–2015	Avaldsnes	40	(3)
2015–2019	Kolbotn	81	(24)
2019–2020	Paris Saint-Germain	11	(0)
2020–2021	VfL Wolfsburg	14	(2)
2021	VfL Wolfsburg II	2	(5)
2021–2022	Avaldsnes	30	(3)
2022–	Vålerenga	88	(45)

International career^{‡}
2011	Norway U15	3	(0)
2011–2012	Norway U16	8	(2)
2012–2013	Norway U17	7	(0)
2013–2015	Norway U19	26	(4)
2015–2019	Norway U23	14	(1)
2019–	Norway	68	(9)
- * Club domestic league appearances and goals as of 8 November 2025 ‡ National team caps and goals as of 14 April 2026

Karina Sævik (born 24 March 1996) is a Norwegian professional footballer who plays as an attacking midfielder or a winger for Toppserien club Vålerenga and the Norway national team.

== Club career ==
Sævik was born in the town of Kopervik in Karmøy Municipality, on 24 March 1996. She started her career in Kopervik IL

and also played senior football for SK Haugar.

Sævik played for the club Avaldsnes IL from 2013 to 2015. She played for Kolbotn Fotball from 2016 to June 2019 and for Paris Saint-Germain from July 2019.

On 16 September 2020, German club Wolfsburg announced the signing of Sævik on a two-year deal.

== International career ==
She was selected to the team representing Norway at the 2019 FIFA Women's World Cup.

On 19 June 2023, she was included in the 23-player Norwegian squad for the FIFA Women's World Cup 2023.

On 16 June 2025, Sævik was called up to the Norway squad for the UEFA Women's Euro 2025.

== Career statistics ==
=== Club ===
As of 8 November 2025

Appearances and goals by club, season and competition
Club	Season	League			Cup		Continental		Total	
Club	Season	Division	Apps	Goals	Apps	Goals	Apps	Goals	Apps	Goals
Avaldsnes IL	2013	Toppserien	9	0	2	0	–		11	0
Avaldsnes IL	2014	Toppserien	20	2	3	0	–		23	2
Avaldsnes IL	2015	Toppserien	11	1	1	2	–		12	3
Avaldsnes IL	Total		40	3	6	2	0	0	46	5
Kolbotn Fotball	2015	Toppserien	11	1	1	0	–		12	1
Kolbotn Fotball	2016	Toppserien	22	3	4	2	–		26	5
Kolbotn Fotball	2017	Toppserien	22	4	2	2	–		24	6
Kolbotn Fotball	2018	Toppserien	16	9	3	2	–		19	11
Kolbotn Fotball	2019	Toppserien	10	7	1	2	–		11	9
Kolbotn Fotball	Total		81	24	11	8	0	0	92	32
Paris Saint-Germain	2019–20	Division 1 Féminine	11	0	0	0	4	1	15	1
VfL Wolfsburg	2020–21	Frauen-Bundesliga	14	1	2	2	4	0	20	3
Avaldsnes IL	2021	Toppserien	17	2	3	2	–		20	4
Avaldsnes IL	2022	Toppserien	13	1	1	0	–		14	1
Avaldsnes IL	Total		30	3	4	2	0	0	34	5
Vålerenga	2022	Toppserien	9	2	1	0	–		10	2
Vålerenga	2023	Toppserien	27	12	5	4	2	1	34	17
Vålerenga	2024	Toppserien	26	13	5	2	9	3	40	18
Vålerenga	2025	Toppserien	26	18	3	4	5	2	34	24
Vålerenga	Total		88	45	14	10	16	6	118	61
Career total			264	76	37	24	24	7	325	107

=== International ===
As of match played 14 April 2026

Appearances and goals by national team and year
National team	Year	Apps	Goals
Norway	2019	13	2
Norway	2020	5	0
Norway	2021	9	2
Norway	2022	7	0
Norway	2023	13	4
Norway	2024	10	0
Norway	2025	9	0
Norway	2026	2	1
Total		68	9

Scores and results list Norway's goal tally first, score column indicates score after each Sævik goal.

List of international goals scored by Karina Sævik
No.	Date	Venue	Opponent	Score	Result	Competition
1	6 March 2019	Estádio Municipal Bela Vista, Parchal, Portugal	Poland	3–0	3–0	2019 Algarve Cup
2	8 October 2019	Tórsvøllur, Tórshavn, Faroe Islands	Faroe Islands	7–0	13–0	UEFA Women's Euro 2022 qualifying
3	16 September 2021	Ullevaal Stadion, Oslo, Norway	Armenia	3–0	10–0	2023 FIFA Women's World Cup qualification
4	25 November 2021	Arena Kombëtare, Tirana, Albania	Albania	4–0	7–0	2023 FIFA Women's World Cup qualification
5	15 February 2023	Stade Raymond Kopa, Angers, France	Uruguay	1–0	1–0	2023 Tournoi de France
6	11 April 2023	Gamla Ullevi, Gothenburg, Sweden	Sweden	2–1	3–3	Friendly
7	22 September 2023	Ullevaal Stadion, Oslo, Norway	Austria	1–0	1–1	2023–24 UEFA Women's Nations League
8	5 December 2023	NV Arena, Sankt Pölten, Austria	Austria	1–2	1–2	2023–24 UEFA Women's Nations League
53.	14 April 2026	Åråsen Stadion, Lillestrøm, Norway	Slovenia	4–0	5–0	2027 FIFA Women's World Cup qualification

== Honours ==
VfL Wolfsburg

- DFB-Pokal: 2020–21

Vålerenga

- Toppserien: 2023

Norway

- Algarve Cup: 2019

Individual

- Toppserien Player of the Year: 2023
- Toppserien Goal of the Year: 2019
