= 2022 Norwegian Women's Cup =

Tournament details
- Country: Norway
- Teams: 54

Final positions
- Champions: Brann
- Runners-up: Stabæk

Tournament statistics
- Matches played: 49
- Goals scored: 223 (4.55 per match)
- Top goal scorer(s): Maria Brochmann (6 goals)

The 2022 Norwegian Women's Cup was the 45th season of the Norwegian annual knock-out football tournament. The first round was played in April and May 2022. The final was played on 5 November 2022.

== Calendar ==
Below are the dates for each round as given by the official schedule:

Round	Main date	Number of fixtures	Clubs
First round	4 May 2022	22	44 → 22
Second round	18 May 2022	16	32 → 16
Third round	15 June 2022	8	16 → 8
Quarter-finals	24 August 2022	4	8 → 4
Semi-finals	14 September 2022	2	4 → 2
Final	5 November 2022	1	2 → 1

== First round ==
10 teams from 1. divisjon and 34 teams from 2. divisjon entered the first round. All Toppserien teams received a bye in this round.

6 April 2022	Volda	1–6	AaFK Fortuna	Volda
18:30 CEST	Andanes 51'	Report	Drozdzik 43'; Eide 65' (pen.), 85', 87'; Nilsen 68', 90+2'	Stadium: Sparebank 1 Bana; Referee: Daniel Refsnes

18 April 2022	Runar	2–0	Høybråten og Stovner	Sandefjord
19:00 CEST	Nilsen 62', 77'	Report		Stadium: Haukerød Kunstgress A Referee: Marius Tvede Hansen

24 April 2022	Polarstjernen	0–1	Porsanger	Vadsø
10:15 CEST		Report	Somby 73'	Stadium: Polarsletta Stadion; Referee: Kim Rune Lydersen

27 April 2022	Snøgg	0–4	Odd	Notodden
19:00 CEST		Report	Aurbekkholen 38'; Vala 46'; Faane 59' (o.g.); Pedersen 90'	Stadium: Notodden Kunstgress; Referee: Martin Berge Pedersen

4 May 2022	Halsøy	w/o	Grand Bodø	Mosjøen
16:00 CEST		Report

4 May 2022	Fart	w/o	Storhamar	Hamar
18:00 CEST		Report

4 May 2022	Kongsvinger	1–3	Ull/Kisa	Kongsvinger
18:00 CEST	Ihlebekk 82'	Report	Sundby 47' (pen.); Pettersen 72'; Olsen 89'	Stadium: Gjemselund Kunstgress; Referee: Maren Hatletvedt

4 May 2022	Raufoss	0–5	Hønefoss	Raufoss
18:00 CEST		Report	Tryterud 21', 34'; Tyribakken 55'; Finnevolden 66'; Normann 83'	Stadium: Nammo Stadion; Referee: Jenny Hoel Lilleøren

4 May 2022	Stathelle	0–2	Amazon Grimstad	Stathelle (Bamble Municipality)
18:00 CEST		Report	Siegele 7'; Bruhjell 58'	Stadium: Bunes Kunstgress; Referee: Mentor Berisha

4 May 2022	Arendal	3–0	Gimletroll	Arendal
18:00 CEST	Rothschild 49'; Ausland 68'; Wilson 90'	Report		Stadium: Norac Stadion; Referee: Rune Byremo

4 May 2022	Haugesund	0–4	Viking	Haugesund
18:00 CEST		Report	Stålesen 28'; Heggheim 40'; Indrebø 41'; Ødegaard 83'	Stadium: Sakkestad Gras; Referee: Daniel Saltveit

4 May 2022	Bryne	0–7	Klepp	Bryne (Time Municipality)
18:00 CEST		Report	Bakke-Andersen 3'; Vistnes 14', 58'; Jensen 22'; Sørenes 42'; Pedersen 51'; Øfsteng 70' (o.g.)	Stadium: Bryne Stadion; Referee: Cecilie Frøyland

4 May 2022	Fyllingsdalen	0–2	Åsane	Bergen
18:00 CEST		Report	Sangolt 12'; Sørbrøden 39'	Stadium: Varden Amfi; Referee: Victoria Lervik

4 May 2022	Loddefjord	3–2	Sogndal	Bergen
18:00 CEST	Gurvin 14'; Andersen 32'; Forthun 59'	Report	Njøs 19'; Rekkedal 51'	Stadium: Alvøen Kunstgress; Referee: Shahad Emad Al-Rantisi

4 May 2022	Nardo	0–12	KIL/Hemne	Trondheim
18:00 CEST		Report	Bloch-Hansen 5', 35', 38'; Eggen 19'; Halset 24', 32'; Halgunset 30', 40', 62'; Tche 46'; Grindeland 76'; Smevoll 83'	Stadium: Nissekollen Kunstgress; Referee: Anders Husøy

4 May 2022	Byåsen	1–2 (a.e.t.)	Tynset	Trondheim
18:00 CEST	Bye 90'	Report	Skogan 71', 101'	Stadium: Byåsen Arena; Referee: Mathea Havig

4 May 2022	Medkila	9–1	Mjølner	Harstad
18:00 CEST	Frantzen 11'; Cooke 45', 48'; Dahl 65'; Larsen 68', 68', 72', 75'; Grønvold 79'	Report	Horrigmoe 27'	Stadium: Harstad Stadion; Referee: Reidar Grønbeck

4 May 2022	TIL 2020	w/o	Tromsdalen	Tromsø
18:00 CEST		Report

4 May 2022	Sarpsborg 08	1–3	Øvrevoll Hosle	Sarpsborg
19:00 CEST	Voltersvik 25' (pen.)	Report	Vangen 21'; Gumaer 49'; Larsen 85'	Stadium: Sarpsborg Stadion; Referee: Rikke Helene Melby

4 May 2022	Grei	5–0	Nanset	Oslo
19:00 CEST	Smith 25'; Fjeldstad 46'; Solskjær 55', 83'; Dalen 79'	Report		Stadium: Grei Kunstgress; Referee: Christine Andersen

4 May 2022	Herd	0–3	Molde	Ålesund
19:00 CEST		Report	Ulvund 10'; Grønseth 35'; Hoås 54'	Stadium: AMFI Moa Stadion; Referee: Martin Javier Solheim

4 May 2022	Sandefjord	w/o	Frigg	Sandefjord
20:15 CEST		Report

== Second round ==
The pair-ups for the second round were announced on 5 May 2022. The 10 Toppserien teams entered this round.

18 May 2022	Grei	0–2	Kolbotn	Oslo
18:00 CEST		Report	Kvernvolden 45'; Dyrehauge 74'	Stadium: Grei Kunstgress; Attendance: 60; Referee: Marie Green Dahle

18 May 2022	Fart	0–9	Vålerenga	Hamar
18:00 CEST		Report	Tvedten 3', 49'; Thorsnes 39', 51', 89'; Stefanovic 47'; Nielsen 75'; Bjelde 76', 80'	Stadium: Fart Kunstgress; Attendance: 80; Referee: Jon Anders Salberg

18 May 2022	Viking	1–3	Avaldsnes	Stavanger
18:00 CEST	Heggheim 73'	Report	Badu 53'; Haugland 61'; Sørensen 90'	Stadium: Viking Stadion; Referee: Cecilie Frøyland

18 May 2022	Loddefjord	0–12	Brann	Bergen
18:00 CEST		Report	Åsland 4', 30', 72' (pen.), 90'; Lund 6'; Brochmann 11', 40', 54'; Bergsvand 58'; Kvamme 74'; Guðmundsdóttir 76'; Lie 90'	Stadium: Alvøen Kunstgress; Referee: Anders Bjerk Hansen

18 May 2022	Tynset	0–12	LSK Kvinner	Tynset
18:00 CEST		Report	Gashi 7'; Worts 14', 23', 55', 83'; Wilmann 26'; Andersen 28', 53'; Brenn 49'; Jakobsson 50'; Karlöf 67'; Linberg 85'	Stadium: Nytrømoen Gras; Attendance: 442; Referee: Kaspar Austad Kummeneje

18 May 2022	Runar	0–8	Røa	Sandefjord
18:30 CEST		Report	Osnes-Ringen 12'; Pinto 18'; Masdal 26', 30', 68'; Fjelldal 39'; Bjørlykhaug 50'; Huse 84'	Stadium: Haukerød Kunstgress; Referee: Adel Kulanic

18 May 2022	Ull/Kisa	0–4	Lyn	Jessheim (Ullensaker Municipality)
19:00 CEST		Report	Mjåseth 7'; Holmen 25'; Henriksen 75'; Søyland 78'	Stadium: Jessheim Stadion; Attendance: 200; Referee: Mahir Cagatay

18 May 2022	Øvrevoll Hosle	4–3	Hønefoss	Bærum Municipality
19:30 CEST	Edvartsen 37'; Berge 61' (o.g.); Reeves 62', 86'	Report	Berge 39' (pen.); Løfshus 54'; Ness 77'	Stadium: Ferd Arena Hosle; Attendance: 95; Referee: Hicham Barrar

18 May 2022	Odd	0–1	Stabæk	Skien
19:30 CEST		Report	Bjånesøy 64'	Stadium: Skagerak Arena; Referee: Pavel Breivik

19 May 2022	Klepp	5–2	Arendal	Kleppe
19:00 CEST	Sørenes 3'; Flokketveit 9', 55'; Jensen 17'; Måland 45'	Report	Ausland 43'; Storli 60'	Stadium: Klepp Stadion; Attendance: 102; Referee: Preben Løvdahl Hellvik

19 May 2022	Åsane	0–1	Arna-Bjørnar	Bergen
19:00 CEST		Report	Veivåg 73'	Stadium: Åsane Arena; Attendance: 130; Referee: Bjørn Tore Tvedt

19 May 2022	KIL/Hemne	1–4	Rosenborg	Kyrkjesæterøra
19:00 CEST	Bragstad 17' (o.g.)	Report	Fornes 6', 64'; Leine 35'; Andreassen 58'	Stadium: Hemne Sparebank Arena; Attendance: 200; Referee: Marit Buhaug Folstad

25 May 2022	Grand Bodø	1–2	TIL 2020	Bodø
18:00 CEST	Opsahl-Engen 18'	Report	Granlind 7'; Bratland 31'	Stadium: Nordlandshallen; Attendance: 73; Referee: Mathea Havig

25 May 2022	Amazon Grimstad	5–0	Sandefjord	Grimstad
19:00 CEST	Walaunet 18'; Jensen 28'; Francis 34'; Pettersen 46', 60'	Report		Stadium: Levermyr Stadion; Referee: Anne-Katrine Kjebekk Thomsen

25 May 2022	Molde	0–1	AaFK Fortuna	Molde
19:00 CEST		Report	Røn 54'	Stadium: Aker Stadion; Referee: Modolf Holm

25 May 2022	Porsanger	1–4	Medkila	Lakselv
19:15 CEST	Hafnor 49'	Report	Berntsen 21'; Hunstad 27'; Cooke 29'; Hix 68'	Stadium: Lakselv Kunstgress; Referee: Kim Rune Lydersen

== Third round ==
The pair-ups for the third round were announced on 30 May 2022. All the matches were played on 15 June.

15 June 2022	Amazon Grimstad	0–1	Vålerenga	Grimstad
18:00 CEST		Report	Brekken 73'	Stadium: Levermyr Stadion; Referee: Marius Schulz

15 June 2022	Stabæk	1–0	Røa	Bærum Municipality
18:00 CEST	Huseby 44'	Report		Stadium: Nadderud Stadion; Attendance: 111; Referee: Marit Skurdal

15 June 2022	Avaldsnes	7–0	Klepp	Karmøy Municipality
18:00 CEST	Løvås 21', 89'; Badu 24'; Dahl 35'; Pedersen 46' (o.g.); Blomquist 49'; Øritzland 83'	Report		Stadium: Avaldsnes Idrettssenter; Attendance: 185; Referee: Johan Kjellesvik

15 June 2022	AaFK Fortuna	1–2	Rosenborg	Ålesund
18:00 CEST	Røn 25'	Report	Nergård 12'; Olsvik 63'	Stadium: Color Line Stadion; Attendance: 610; Referee: Haakon Tronstad

15 June 2022	Medkila	1–2	Kolbotn	Harstad
18:00 CEST	Hix 73'	Report	Hørte 2'; Pedersen 82'	Stadium: Harstad Stadion; Attendance: 130; Referee: Håkon Hansen

15 June 2022	LSK Kvinner	2–0	Øvrevoll Hosle	Lillestrøm
19:00 CEST	Godø 36'; Luthcke 51'	Report		Stadium: LSK-Hallen; Attendance: 85; Referee: Arion Shaqiri

15 June 2022	TIL 2020	1–3	Lyn	Tromsø
19:00 CEST	Simonsen 18'	Report	Closs 44'; Olsen 68'; Isaksen 75'	Stadium: Alfheim Stadion; Referee: Amalie Salamonsen

15 June 2022	Brann	5–0	Arna-Bjørnar	Bergen
19:00 CEST	Lund 24' (pen.); Bergsvand 31'; Þorvaldsdóttir 37'; Engesvik 43'; Brochmann 49'	Report		Stadium: Brann Stadion; Attendance: 608; Referee: Freek van Herk

== Quarter-finals ==
The draw for the quarter-finals was made on 23 June 2022.

24 August 2022	Kolbotn	1–0	Lyn	Nordre Follo Municipality
18:00 CEST	Klæboe 74'	Report		Stadium: Sofiemyr Stadion; Attendance: 220; Referee: Cecilie Frøyland

24 August 2022	Brann	6–0	LSK Kvinner	Bergen
18:00 CEST	Hansen 2'; Yallop 9'; Stenevik 14'; Guðmundsdóttir 35', 63'; Brochmann 73'	Report		Stadium: Stemmemyren Kunstgress; Referee: Sarah Zangeneh

24 August 2022	Stabæk	1–0	Avaldsnes	Bærum Municipality
18:00 CEST	Sundlöv 88'	Report		Stadium: Nadderud Stadion; Attendance: 132; Referee: Mohammad Hafezi

24 August 2022	Rosenborg	3–2	Vålerenga	Trondheim
18:00 CEST	Nergård 16'; Fornes 22'; Hørte 71'	Report	Thomsen 30'; Bjelde 61'	Stadium: Koteng Arena; Attendance: 302; Referee: Karoline Jensen

== Semi-finals ==
The draw for the semi-finals was made on 24 August 2022.

14 September 2022	Kolbotn	1–6	Brann	Nordre Follo Municipality
17:00 CEST	Andresen 88'	Report	Lie 7'; Bergsvand 38'; Gaupset 51'; Hansen 59'; Brochmann 69'; Engesvik 80'	Stadium: Sofiemyr Stadion; Referee: Marit Buhaug Folstad

14 September 2022	Stabæk	2–1	Rosenborg	Bærum Municipality
20:10 CEST	Vallotto 23'; Omarsdottir 81'	Report	Hansen 43'	Stadium: Nadderud Stadion; Attendance: 290; Referee: Karoline Marie Jensen

== Final ==
5 November 2022
16:00 CET

Brann	3–1	Stabæk
Lie 31'; Gaupset 42', 67'	Report	Omarsdottir 57'

Ullevaal Stadion, Oslo
Attendance: 5,478
Referee: Sarah Fatemeh Zangeneh

== Top scorers ==
Rank	Player	Club	Goals
1	(Norway) Maria Brochmann	Brann	6
2	(Norway) Frida Nordgård Larsen	Medkila	4
2	(England) Fiona Worts	LSK Kvinner	4
2	(Norway) Therese Åsland	Brann	4
