= Emma Braut Brunes =

Norwegian footballer (born 2003)

Personal information
- Date of birth: 16 October 2003 (age 23)
- Position: Defender

Team information
- Current team: Brann
- Number: 4

Youth career
- –2019: Bryne
- 2019: Klepp

Senior career*
Years	Team	Apps	(Gls)
2018	Bryne	1	(0)
2020–2022	Klepp	20	(1)
2023–2024	Kolbotn	49	(4)
2025–2026	Brøndby	13	(0)
2025	→ LSK Kvinner (loan)	13	(1)
2026–	Brann	0	

International career^{‡}
2018	Norway U15	3	(0)
2019	Norway U16	11	(1)
2020	Norway U17	1	(0)
2021	Norway U19	5	(1)
2024–2025	Norway U23	5	(0)
- * Club domestic league appearances and goals as of 1 July 2026 ‡ National team caps and goals as of 1 July 2026

Emma Braut Brunes (born 16 October 2003) is a Norwegian footballer who plays as a defender for Toppserien club SK Brann.

== Career ==
Brunes hails from Bryne and played once for Bryne FK in the 2018 Second Division, as well as a playoff match for the 2019 First Division. She also made her international debut for Norway U15 in 2018. In the summer of 2019 she moved to Jæren's traditional number one women's team Klepp IL as she enrolled in upper secondary school. Her real breakthrough in Toppserien came in 2021, when she played regularly in Klepp's defence. However she missed the entire year of 2022 to a damaged cruciate ligament.

In 2023 Brunes moved to Eastern Norway, to Kolbotn IL, where by the end of the year she had served as team captain. The following year she reentered the Norway national teams, playing for Norway U23. She left Kolbotn in 2025 for Danish club Brøndby IF, being loaned out to LSK Kvinner for the first half of 2025.

== Personal life ==
Brunes is a member of the Braut footballing family. She is a sister of Jonatan Braut Brunes. Her first cousins, Erling Haaland and Albert Braut Tjåland both play as strikers for Manchester City and Rosseland respectively.

She supports Liverpool.
