= Viking FK Kvinner =

Women's association football club in Stavanger, Norway

Viking Kvinner
- Full name: Viking Fotballklubb Kvinner
- Nickname: De mørkeblå (The dark blues)
- Founded: 2011; 15 years ago
- Ground: Viking Stadion, Stavanger
- Capacity: 15,900
- Chair: Rune Bertelsen
- Head coach: Magnus Meling
- League: 1. divisjon
- 2024: 1. divisjon, 4th of 10
- Website: www.vikingfotball.no
Home colours	Away colours

Viking FK Kvinner (English: Viking FK Women) is the women's team of Norwegian football club Viking FK. Based in Stavanger, it plays in the Norwegian First Division, the second tier of women's football in Norway. Founded in 2011, the team first entered the league system ahead of the 2015 season.

== History ==
Viking played in the Norwegian women's top division from 1984 to 1986.

The current team was founded in 2011. In 2015, it entered the league system, participating in the Third Division, the fourth tier of Norwegian women's football. In the 2016 season, the team cooperated with neighbouring Hinna, whose first team was in the Second Division at the time. The cooperation lasted only for one season, before Viking restarted their operations.

The 2017 season resulted in a second place finish in the Third Division, two points behind Staal Jørpeland. In 2018, Viking finished first in their group and subsequently earned promotion to the Second Division. The following season, the team again won their group, which qualified them for the promotion play-offs to the First Division. Viking were eliminated in the play-offs, and were therefore not promoted. The 2020 season was cancelled due to the COVID-19 pandemic in Norway. In October 2020, Viking FK issued a statement to further focus on the women's team, in hope of reaching the Toppserien, the top division, as soon as possible. This meant that the team would be strengthened, gradually professionalized and that home matches would be played at Viking Stadion.

In May 2021, there were negotiations between Viking and Toppserien club Avaldsnes regarding a cooperation, which could have seen Viking take over Avaldsnes' spot in the Toppserien. The negotiations fell through in August 2021 due to financial issues. Viking finished the 2021 season in first place, which again qualified them for the promotion play-offs. In the final game of the play-offs, Viking won 2–1 against Odd, one goal short of promotion. In 2022, Viking finished second behind Fyllingsdalen, In 2023, Viking won promotion to the First Division.

== List of seasons ==
Season	League										Cup	Other	
Season	Division	Pos	Pld	W	D	L	GF	GA	GD	Pts	Cup	Competition	Result
2015	3. divisjon	3rd	20	11	2	7	53	31	+22	35	DNQ		
2016	Cooperation with Hinna												
2017	3. divisjon	2nd	22	17	3	2	94	28	+66	54	DNQ		
2018	3. divisjon	↑ 1st	22	21	0	1	127	12	+115	63	DNQ		
2019	2. divisjon	1st	22	18	2	2	80	26	+54	56	DNQ	Promotion play-offs	2nd (not promoted)
2020	Season cancelled												
2021	2. divisjon	1st	11	10	1	0	40	9	+31	31	Second round	Promotion play-offs	2nd (not promoted)
2022	2. divisjon	2nd	22	18	2	2	114	9	+105	56	Second round		
2023	2. divisjon	↑ 1st	26	23	2	1	83	11	+72	71	Second round		
2024	1. divisjon	4th	24	8	3	13	28	37	−9	27	Quarter-finals		

== Current squad ==
As of 9 September 2026

Note: Flags indicate national team as defined under FIFA eligibility rules; some limited exceptions apply. Players may hold more than one non-FIFA nationality.

No.	Pos.	Nation	Player
2	DF	NOR	Helene Broch
3	DF	NOR	Ida Hetland Pedersen
4	DF	NOR	Helle Aune
5	DF	NOR	Marie Hella Andresen
6	MF	NOR	Sofie Bjørnsen
7	MF	NOR	Mille Aune
8	MF	NOR	Nora Rongved
9	FW	NOR	Vilde Bakke-Andersen
10	DF	NOR	Nora Heggheim (captain)
11	FW	NOR	Martine Kjølholdt
13	DF	FIN	Aura Nyholm
14	FW	NOR	Davis Lundhaug

No.	Pos.	Nation	Player
16	MF	NOR	Hedda Helle Skadal
17	FW	NOR	Frida Skoglund Pedersen
18	FW	NOR	Hanne Sæthre Jakobsen
19	DF	DEN	Frederikke Holmberg
21	DF	NOR	Åsa Bergsrønning
22	FW	NOR	Mathilde Hodne Voll
23	DF	NOR	Selma Løvås
24	GK	NOR	Hannah Markussen
25	GK	NOR	Beate Engeli
30	DF	NOR	Synne Kjølholdt
31	FW	NOR	Eivor Ulvund

=== Out on loan ===
Note: Flags indicate national team as defined under FIFA eligibility rules; some limited exceptions apply. Players may hold more than one non-FIFA nationality.

No.	Pos.	Nation	Player
—	DF	NOR	Hannah Handeland (at Bryne FK until 31 December 2026)
—	MF	NOR	Iben Robertsen (at Bryne FK until 31 December 2026)

== Technical staff ==
Position	Staff
Head coach	(Norway) Magnus Meling
Assistant coach	(Norway) Johnny Furdal
Player developer	(Norway) Preben Stangeland
Goalkeeping coach	(Norway) Erlend Jacobsen
Fitness coach	(Norway) Tarald Sørenes
Medical officer	(Norway) Liisa Maria Iversen
Mental coach	(Norway) Ellen Heggheim

Last updated: 25 March 2026
