= SK Brann (women) =

Norwegian women's football club

Sportsklubben Brann
- Full name: Sportsklubben Brann
- Nicknames: Bergens stolthet (The pride of Bergen); Fotballrepublikken (The football republic)
- Short name: Brann
- Founded: 26 September 1908; 118 years ago, as Ski- og Fotboldklubben Brann; 1978; 48 years ago as IL Sandviken
- Ground: Brann Stadion, Bergen
- Capacity: 17,500
- Chairman: Arild Mjøs Andersen
- Head coach: Laura Kaminski
- League: Toppserien
- 2026: Toppserien, 1st of 10 (champions)
- Website: www.brann.no
| Home colours | Away colours |

SK Brann (previously known as IL Sandviken) is a Norwegian women's football team based in Bergen. The team plays in Norway's top league, Toppserien.

== History ==
The team used to be part of IL Sandviken. Sandviken's women's team were a mainstay in Toppserien since its formation, and won it for the first time in 2021. They also won the Norwegian Women's Cup in 1995. The team was renamed SK Brann Kvinner ahead of the 2022 season as part of a merger process with Bergen's most popular football club, SK Brann. In January 2023 they were fully merged with Brann, becoming the club's women's team. In their first season as Brann, the team were crowned champions of both the 2022 Toppserien and the 2022 Norwegian Women's Cup. Having previously played most of their games at the 1500-capacity Stemmemyren stadium, during the 2024 season the team moved permanently into Brann Stadion, with a capacity of 16 750. The team has by far the highest average attendance in Norwegian women's football. During the 2025 season average home attendance in the league was 3,100, while closest rival Rosenborg on average only attracted 757 spectators.

== Players and staff ==
=== Current squad ===
As of 18 November 2026

Note: Flags indicate national team as defined under FIFA eligibility rules; some limited exceptions apply. Players may hold more than one non-FIFA nationality.

| No. | Pos. | Nation | Player |
|---|---|---|---|
| 1 | GK | NOR | Sunniva Skoglund |
| 3 | DF | NOR | Mia Authen |
| 4 | DF | NOR | Emma Braut Brunes |
| 6 | MF | NOR | Carina Wik Alfredsen |
| 8 | MF | NOR | Karoline Haugland |
| 9 | FW | NOR | Amalie Eikeland |
| 12 | GK | NOR | Maria Flister |
| 13 | FW | USA | Brenna Lovera |
| 16 | FW | ISL | Diljá Ýr Zomers |
| 18 | MF | NOR | Nora Lie Eghdami |

| No. | Pos. | Nation | Player |
|---|---|---|---|
| 19 | FW | NOR | Monica Isaksen |
| 20 | DF | NOR | Josefine Birkelund |
| 21 | GK | NOR | Sandra Stavenes |
| 23 | DF | NOR | Tomine Svendheim |
| 24 | DF | FIN | Nea Lehtola |
| 26 | FW | NOR | Heidi Halbmayr |
| 28 | MF | FIN | Emma Peuhkurinen |
| 30 | DF | FIN | Joanna Tynnilä |
| 32 | MF | NOR | Maren Johnsen |
| 90 | MF | GHA | Stella Nyamekye |

=== Out on loan ===
Note: Flags indicate national team as defined under FIFA eligibility rules; some limited exceptions apply. Players may hold more than one non-FIFA nationality.

| No. | Pos. | Nation | Player |
|---|---|---|---|
| 31 | MF | NOR | Leah Garen (at Åsane until 31 December 2026) |

=== Coaching staff ===
As of 15 July 2026

Sporting director: Lars Johan Myklebust
Head coach: Laura Kaminski
Goalkeeping coach: Daniel Matraszek
Assistant coach: Knut Slatheim
Analyst: Leif Joakim Birkeland Nilsen
Head of performance: Lucas Skoog
Team manager: Hedda Duffy
Physician: Christian Redisch
Physician: Asle Kjellsen
Physical therapist: Kari Fykse Lie
Chiropractor: Jørgen Stein

== Honours ==
- Toppserien

Winners (3): 2022, 2025, 2026
Runners-up (1): 2024

- Norwegian Cup

Winners (2): 2022, 2026

As Sandviken:

- Toppserien

Winners (1): 2021
Runners-up (1): 1996

- Norwegian Cup

Winners (1): 1995

Runners-up (3): 1991, 2018, 2021

== Seasons ==
| Season | League | Pos. | Pl. | W | D | L | GS | GA | P | Cup | Europe | |
|---|---|---|---|---|---|---|---|---|---|---|---|---|
| 2022 | Toppserien | 1 | 18 | 14 | 3 | 1 | 53 | 13 | 45 | Winners | CL | Second qualifying round |
| 2022 | Toppserien | 1 | 6 | 4 | 2 | 0 | 10 | 4 | 20 | Winners | CL | Second qualifying round |
| 2023 | Toppserien | 4 | 27 | 13 | 7 | 7 | 52 | 30 | 46 | Quarter-finals | CL | Quarter-finals |
| 2024 | Toppserien | 2 | 27 | 19 | 1 | 7 | 70 | 24 | 58 | Semi-finals | — | |
| 2025 | Toppserien | 1 | 27 | 24 | 2 | 1 | 90 | 11 | 74 | Semi-finals | CL EC | Third qualifying round Second qualifying round |
| 2026 | Toppserien | 1 | 22 | 18 | 3 | 1 | 62 | 8 | 57 | Winners | CL EC | Third qualifying round Quarter-finals |

== In European football ==
=== Results ===
All results (away, home and aggregate) list the club's goal tally first.

| Season | Competition | Round | Club | Home | Away | Aggregate |
|---|---|---|---|---|---|---|
| 2022–23 | UEFA Women's Champions League | Qualifying round 1 SF | (Turkey) ALG Spor | 1–0 | | |
| 2022–23 | UEFA Women's Champions League | Qualifying round 1 F | (Serbia) Spartak Subotica | 3–1 | | |
| 2022–23 | UEFA Women's Champions League | Qualifying round 2 | (Sweden) Rosengård | 1–1 ^{f} | 1–3 | 1–4 |
| 2023–24 | UEFA Women's Champions League | Qualifying round 1 SF | (Bulgaria) Lokomotiv Stara Zagora | 5–0 | | |
| 2023–24 | UEFA Women's Champions League | Qualifying round 1 F | (Belgium) Anderlecht | 3–0 | | |
| 2023–24 | UEFA Women's Champions League | Qualifying round 2 | (Scotland) Glasgow City | 2–0 | 4–0 ^{f} | 6–0 |
| 2023–24 | UEFA Women's Champions League | Group stage | (France) Lyon | 2–2 | 1–3 ^{f} | 2nd |
| 2023–24 | UEFA Women's Champions League | Group stage | (Czech Republic) Slavia Prague | 1–0 ^{f} | 1–0 | 2nd |
| 2023–24 | UEFA Women's Champions League | Group stage | (Austria) St. Pölten | 2–1 | 2–1 ^{f} | 2nd |
| 2023–24 | UEFA Women's Champions League | Quarter-finals | (Spain) Barcelona | 1–2 ^{f} | 1–3 | 2–5 |
| 2025–26 | UEFA Women's Champions League | Qualifying round 2 SF | (Italy) Inter Milan | 2–1 | | |
| 2025–26 | UEFA Women's Champions League | Qualifying round 2 F | (Portugal) Braga | 1–0 | | |
| 2025–26 | UEFA Women's Champions League | Qualifying round 3 | (England) Manchester United | 1–0 ^{f} | 0–3 | 1–3 |
| 2025–26 | UEFA Women's Europa Cup | Qualifying round 2 | (Sweden) Hammarby | 1–1 | 1–4 ^{f} | 2–5 |
| 2026–27 | UEFA Women's Champions League | Qualifying round 2 SF | (Kosovo) Mitrovica | 5–0 | | |
| 2026–27 | UEFA Women's Champions League | Qualifying round 2 F | (Greece) PAOK | 3–2 | | |
| 2026–27 | UEFA Women's Champions League | Qualifying round 3 | Austria Wien | 2–1 ^{f} | 0–4 | 2–5 |
| 2026–27 | UEFA Women's Europa Cup | Qualifying round 2 | (Finland) HJK | 4–0 | 2–0 ^{f} | 6–0 |
| 2026–27 | UEFA Women's Europa Cup | Round of 16 | (Poland) Czarni Sosnowiec | 3–0 ^{f} | 5–1 | 8–1 |
| 2026–27 | UEFA Women's Europa Cup | Quarter-finals | (Portugal) Torreense | | | |

^{f} First leg. Colour key: Green = Brann win; Yellow = draw; Red = opponents win.

=== UEFA club coefficient ranking ===
As of 11 November 2026

| Rank | Team | Coefficient |
|---|---|---|
| 15 | (Sweden) Hammarby | 32.000 |
| 16 | (England) Manchester City | 31.000 |
| 17 | (Norway) Brann | 30.000 |
| 18 | (Austria) St. Pölten | 28.000 |
| 19 | (Netherlands) Ajax | 27.500 |

== Coaching history ==
SK Brann head coaches
| Dates | Name | Notes |
|---|---|---|
| 2020–2022 | (Norway) Alexander Straus | |
| 2022–2023 | (New Zealand) Olli Harder | Interim manager, later given permanent contract |
| 2023–2025 | (England) Martin Ho | |
| 2025 | (Norway) Leif Gunnar Smerud | |
| 2026– | (England) Laura Kaminski | |

== Player statistics ==
=== Most appearances ===
As of 11 November 2026

Competitive matches only, appearances as a substitute in brackets. Players currently at the club in bold. Sandviken era not counted.

Players with most appearances for SK Brann
| Rank | Player | Years | League | Cup | Europe | Total |
|---|---|---|---|---|---|---|
| 1 | (Norway) **Karoline Haugland** | 2023–present | 96 (9) | 14 (4) | 25 (2) | **135** (15) |
| 2 | (Norway) Ingrid Stenevik | 2022–2026 | 82 (18) | 15 (1) | 22 (3) | **119** (22) |
| 3 | (Norway) **Amalie Eikeland** | 2023–present | 76 (5) | 12 (1) | 24 (4) | **112** (10) |
| 4 | (Norway) Signe Gaupset | 2022–2025 | 80 (12) | 12 (5) | 19 (1) | **111** (18) |
| 4 | (Finland) **Joanna Tynnilä** | 2023–present | 73 (2) | 12 (3) | 26 (0) | **111** (5) |
| 6 | (Norway) Marthine Østenstad | 2022–2025 | 83 (7) | 12 (2) | 13 (0) | **108** (9) |
| 7 | (Norway) Cecilie Redisch Kvamme | 2022–2026 | 71 (12) | 11 (3) | 21 (6) | **103** (21) |
| 8 | (Norway) Rakel Engesvik | 2022–2024 | 72 (26) | 10 (5) | 14 (2) | **96** (33) |
| 9 | (Norway) **Nora Lie Eghdami** | 2022–2025; 2026–present | 70 (22) | 11 (3) | 14 (9) | **95** (34) |
| 10 | (Norway) Aurora Mikalsen | 2022–2024 | 73 (0) | 5 (0) | 16 (0) | **94** (0) |

=== Top goalscorers ===
As of 11 November 2026

Competitive matches only. Matches played (including as a substitute) appear in brackets. Players currently at the club in bold. Sandviken era not counted.

Top goalscorers for SK Brann
| Rank | Player | Years | League | Cup | Europe | Total |
|---|---|---|---|---|---|---|
| 1 | (Norway) **Amalie Eikeland** | 2023–present | 30 (76) | 9 (12) | 3 (24) | **42** (112) |
| 2 | (United States) **Brenna Lovera** | 2025–present | 31 (35) | 2 (4) | 5 (14) | **38** (53) |
| 3 | (Norway) Anna Aahjem | 2024–2026 | 30 (54) | 4 (10) | 3 (9) | **37** (73) |
| 4 | (Norway) Signe Gaupset | 2022–2025 | 24 (80) | 5 (12) | 2 (19) | **31** (111) |
| 5 | (Norway) Maria Brochmann | 2022–2023 | 13 (42) | 11 (8) | 6 (9) | **30** (59) |
| 5 | (Scotland) Lauren Davidson | 2024–2026 | 23 (56) | 4 (7) | 3 (14) | **30** (77) |
| 7 | (Norway) Rakel Engesvik | 2022–2024 | 20 (72) | 2 (10) | 4 (14) | **26** (96) |
| 8 | (Norway) Marit Bratberg Lund | 2022–2024 | 19 (61) | 2 (9) | 1 (16) | **22** (86) |
| 8 | (Norway) **Nora Lie Eghdami** | 2022–2025; 2026–present | 15 (70) | 6 (11) | 1 (14) | **22** (95) |
| 10 | (Norway) **Karoline Haugland** | 2023–present | 15 (96) | 5 (14) | 1 (25) | **21** (135) |

=== Player of the year ===
Brann's official supporters' club, Bataljonen, selects the player of the year at the end of each season.

- 2023: (Norway) Marit Bratberg Lund
- 2024: (Norway) Anna Aahjem
- 2025: (Norway) Signe Gaupset
- 2026: (Scotland) Lauren Davidson

== See also ==
- List of SK Brann (women) records and statistics
- List of SK Brann seasons
