= 2023 Norwegian First Division (women) =

Norwegian women's football season

Norwegian First Division
- Season: 2023
- Dates: 25 March 2023 – 18 November 2023
- Champions: Kolbotn
- Promoted: Kolbotn
- Relegated: Grei; Klepp
- Matches: 117
- Goals: 377 (3.22 per match)
- Top goalscorer: Mali Trøan (13 goals)
- Biggest home win: AaFK Fortuna 6–0 Grei (29 April 2023); TIL 2020 6–0 Grei (3 June 2023)
- Biggest away win: Klepp 0–6 Øvrevoll Hosle (24 June 2023)
- Highest scoring: Grei 6–2 Hønefoss (12 November 2023)

The 2023 Norwegian First Division was the 39th season of the Norwegian First Division, the second-tier Norwegian women's football division, and the 22nd season under the current format. The league consists of 10 teams. The season started on 25 March 2023 and ended on 18 November 2023, not including play-off matches.

== Teams ==
Locations of teams in the 2023 First Division.

The following ten teams compete in the 2023 First Division.

Club	Municipality	Ground
AaFK Fortuna	Ålesund Municipality	Color Line Stadion
Fyllingsdalen	Bergen Municipality	Varden Amfi
Grand Bodø	Bodø Municipality	Nordlandshallen
Grei	Oslo Municipality	Grei Kunstgress
Hønefoss	Ringerike Municipality	Aka Arena
KIL/Hemne	Heim Municipality	Hemne Sparebank Arena
Klepp	Klepp Municipality	Klepp Stadion
Kolbotn	Nordre Follo Municipality	Østre Greverud Kunstgress
TIL 2020	Tromsø Municipality	Alfheim Stadion
Øvrevoll Hosle	Bærum Municipality	Hoslebanen Kunstgress

== Regular season ==
The regular season consists of 10 teams, who play each other twice, totalling 18 matches per team. After 18 matches, the league is split into two groups consisting of the top four teams and the bottom six teams. The teams carry over their points and goal difference from the regular season.

Pos	Team	Pld	W	D	L	GF	GA	GD	Pts	Qualification
1	Kolbotn	18	14	3	1	37	10	+27	45	Qualification for the promotion group
2	AaFK Fortuna	18	12	1	5	44	27	+17	37	Qualification for the promotion group
3	TIL 2020	18	10	4	4	38	18	+20	34	Qualification for the promotion group
4	Øvrevoll Hosle	18	8	2	8	38	35	+3	26	Qualification for the promotion group
5	KIL/Hemne	18	7	3	8	21	26	−5	24	Qualification for the relegation group
6	Fyllingsdalen	18	6	5	7	25	26	−1	23	Qualification for the relegation group
7	Hønefoss	18	6	3	9	24	32	−8	21	Qualification for the relegation group
8	Grand Bodø	18	6	3	9	24	32	−8	21	Qualification for the relegation group
9	Grei	18	3	4	11	19	41	−22	13	Qualification for the relegation group
10	Klepp	18	2	4	12	13	36	−23	10	Qualification for the relegation group

Source: NFF (in Norwegian)
Rules for classification: 1) Points; 2) Goal difference; 3) Goals scored; 4) Head-to-head points; 5) Head-to-head goal difference; 6) Head-to-head goals scored.

=== Results ===
Home \ Away	AFK	FYL	GRA	GRE	HØN	KIL	KLE	KOL	TIL	ØVH
AaFK Fortuna	—	2–2	2–0	6–0	3–1	2–1	3–0	2–3	4–2	4–3
Fyllingsdalen	0–1	—	1–0	2–2	1–2	3–0	2–0	0–3	1–0	3–0
Grand Bodø	3–1	4–2	—	2–3	0–1	2–1	3–0	0–1	1–1	3–2
Grei	1–2	3–0	1–3	—	3–2	1–1	0–2	1–2	0–4	2–3
Hønefoss	1–4	3–3	0–0	1–1	—	4–0	3–2	0–4	2–0	1–2
KIL/Hemne	2–0	1–0	3–0	1–0	3–0	—	2–1	0–0	0–2	1–0
Klepp	0–1	0–1	0–0	1–0	1–2	2–2	—	1–5	0–1	0–6
Kolbotn	4–2	1–1	3–0	2–0	1–0	1–0	2–0	—	0–0	2–1
TIL 2020	2–1	2–2	4–2	6–0	2–0	5–1	1–1	0–2	—	4–1
Øvrevoll Hosle	2–4	2–1	6–1	1–1	2–1	3–2	2–2	2–1	0–2	—

Source: Norwegian Football Federation
Legend: Blue = home team win; Yellow = draw; Red = away team win.

== Promotion group ==
Pos	Team	Pld	W	D	L	GF	GA	GD	Pts	Promotion or qualification
1	Kolbotn (C, P)	6	4	1	1	48	13	+35	58	Promotion to Toppserien
2	TIL 2020	6	5	0	1	49	23	+26	49	Qualification for the promotion play-offs
3	AaFK Fortuna	6	1	1	4	50	37	+13	41	
4	Øvrevoll Hosle	6	1	0	5	46	53	−7	29	

Source: NFF (in Norwegian)
Rules for classification: 1) Points; 2) Goal difference; 3) Goals scored; 4) Head-to-head points; 5) Head-to-head goal difference; 6) Head-to-head goals scored.
(C) Champions; (P) Promoted

=== Results ===
Home \ Away	AFK	KOL	TIL	ØVH
AaFK Fortuna	—	0–0	0–1	3–4
Kolbotn	1–0	—	1–2	4–1
TIL 2020	3–0	0–2	—	2–1
Øvrevoll Hosle	1–3	0–3	1–3	—

Source: Norwegian Football Federation
Legend: Blue = home team win; Yellow = draw; Red = away team win.

== Relegation group ==
Pos	Team	Pld	W	D	L	GF	GA	GD	Pts	Relegation
1	KIL/Hemne	5	3	1	1	35	35	0	34	
2	Grand Bodø	5	3	1	1	33	39	−6	31	
3	Hønefoss	5	2	0	3	33	46	−13	27	
4	Fyllingsdalen	5	1	0	4	32	34	−2	26	
5	Grei (R)	5	3	2	0	32	47	−15	24	Relegation to Second Division
6	Klepp (R)	5	0	2	3	19	50	−31	12	Relegation to Second Division

Source: NFF (in Norwegian)
Rules for classification: 1) Points; 2) Goal difference; 3) Goals scored; 4) Head-to-head points; 5) Head-to-head goal difference; 6) Head-to-head goals scored.
(R) Relegated

=== Results ===
Home \ Away	FYL	GRA	GRE	HØN	KIL	KLE
Fyllingsdalen	—	1–2	0–1	—	—	—
Grand Bodø	—	—	0–2	4–2	—	—
Grei	—	—	—	6–2	1–1	3–3
Hønefoss	1–0	—	—	—	—	3–2
KIL/Hemne	4–3	2–3	—	2–1	—	—
Klepp	0–3	0–0	—	—	1–5	—

Source: Norwegian Football Federation
Legend: Blue = home team win; Yellow = draw; Red = away team win.

== Top scorers ==
Rank	Player	Club	Goals
1	(Norway) Mali Trøan	TIL 2020	13
2	(Norway) Vilde Bratland	TIL 2020	11
3	(Norway) Martine Fenger	Kolbotn	10
3	(Norway) Silje Nyhagen	Hønefoss	10
3	(Norway) Nora Håheim	AaFK Fortuna	10
3	(Norway) Mari Løyland	Øvrevoll Hosle	10

== Awards ==
Award	Winner	Club
Player of the Year	(Norway) Selma Panengstuen	Kolbotn
Breakthrough of the Year	(Norway) Martine Fenger	Kolbotn
Coach of the Year	(Norway) Tresor Egholm	Kolbotn
Coach of the Year	(Norway) Vetle Vangstuen	Kolbotn
