= Loddefjord IL =

Norwegian football club

- Full name: Loddefjord Idrettslag
- Founded: 19 January 1961
- Ground: Alvøen idrettspark, Bergen
- League: Third Division
- 2024: 9th

Loddefjord Idrettslag is a Norwegian multi-sports club from Laksevåg, Bergen. It has sections for association football, basketball, track and field, cheerleading, Nordic skiing and figure skating.

The club was founded on 19 January 1961 at Alvøen. It had a certain predecessor club in Algo, which stood for Alvøen and Godvik. The club introduced gymnastics, football, skiing, athletics and table tennis during the 1960s, and swimming in 1976. The club held mountain running, cross-country running and skiing races.

The men's football team plays in the Third Division, the fourth tier of Norwegian football. During the 1990s and 2000s, the club mostly played below the fourth tier, with exceptions in 1999, 2003, 2006–2008 and 2015.

The highlight during that period was a fourth place in the 2007 Third Division, as well as reaching the first round of the 2008 Norwegian Football Cup. After winning promotion from the 2022 Fourth Division, Loddefjord was back in the Third Division from 2023.

The women's football team played in the 2024 Third Division, whence they withdrew mid-season. They last played in the Second Division in 2022

Among Loddefjord IL's individual athletes are para-skier Mariann Marthinsen and discus thrower Sven Martin Skagestad.
