= 2024 Norwegian First Division (women) =

Norwegian women's football season

Norwegian First Division
- Season: 2024
- Dates: 16 March 2024 – 16 November 2024
- Champions: Hønefoss
- Promoted: Hønefoss; Bodø/Glimt
- Relegated: Øvrevoll Hosle
- Matches: 117
- Goals: 329 (2.81 per match)
- Top goalscorer: Kristin Gumaer (19 goals)
- Biggest home win: Odd 7–0 KIL/Hemne (16 November 2024)
- Biggest away win: Fyllingsdalen 0–7 Hønefoss (23 June 2024)
- Highest scoring: AaFK Fortuna 7–1 Øvrevoll Hosle (7 July 2024)

The 2024 Norwegian First Division was the 40th season of the Norwegian First Division, the second-tier Norwegian women's football division, and the 23rd season under the current format. The league consists of 10 teams.

== Regular season ==
The regular season consists of 10 teams, who play each other twice, totalling 18 matches per team. After 18 matches, the league is split into two groups consisting of the top four teams and the bottom six teams. The teams carry over their points and goal difference from the regular season.

Pos	Team	Pld	W	D	L	GF	GA	GD	Pts	Qualification
1	Hønefoss	18	14	3	1	49	15	+34	45	Qualification for the promotion group
2	AaFK Fortuna	18	12	4	2	45	10	+35	40	Qualification for the promotion group
3	Bodø/Glimt	18	12	1	5	31	16	+15	37	Qualification for the promotion group
4	Viking	18	7	3	8	21	29	−8	24	Qualification for the promotion group
5	Fyllingsdalen	18	6	2	10	20	38	−18	20	Qualification for the relegation group
6	KIL/Hemne	18	5	4	9	22	30	−8	19	Qualification for the relegation group
7	Øvrevoll Hosle	18	4	7	7	21	38	−17	19	Qualification for the relegation group
8	Avaldsnes	18	5	3	10	18	32	−14	18	Qualification for the relegation group
9	Odd	18	5	2	11	20	27	−7	17	Qualification for the relegation group
10	Tromsø	18	4	3	11	18	30	−12	15	Qualification for the relegation group

Source: Norwegian Football Federation (in Norwegian)
Rules for classification: 1) Points; 2) Goal difference; 3) Goals scored; 4) Head-to-head points; 5) Head-to-head goal difference; 6) Head-to-head goals scored.

=== Results ===
Home \ Away	AFK	AVA	BOD	FYL	HØN	KIL	ODD	TRO	VIK	ØVR
AaFK Fortuna	—	1–1	5–0	3–1	1–1	2–0	2–1	6–0	2–0	7–1
Avaldsnes	0–2	—	0–1	2–2	1–4	2–1	0–1	2–1	1–0	2–1
Bodø/Glimt	1–0	2–2	—	4–0	3–0	3–0	4–1	2–0	0–1	3–2
Fyllingsdalen	1–0	2–1	1–3	—	0–7	0–1	1–0	2–0	1–2	0–3
Hønefoss	2–2	3–1	1–0	5–1	—	2–1	2–0	1–0	2–2	6–0
KIL/Hemne	1–1	4–0	0–2	3–2	1–3	—	2–2	0–4	0–3	1–1
Odd	0–1	2–0	0–1	1–2	0–1	2–0	—	2–1	2–3	2–2
Tromsø	0–2	2–1	1–2	2–1	1–2	0–1	1–2	—	2–2	1–1
Viking	0–4	1–2	1–0	0–2	0–3	1–6	1–0	0–1	—	3–0
Øvrevoll Hosle	0–4	2–0	1–0	1–1	1–4	0–0	3–2	1–1	1–1	—

Source: Norwegian Football Federation
Legend: Blue = home team win; Yellow = draw; Red = away team win.

== Promotion group ==
Pos	Team	Pld	W	D	L	GF	GA	GD	Pts	Promotion or qualification
1	Hønefoss (C, P)	6	3	3	0	60	19	+41	57	Promotion to Toppserien
2	Bodø/Glimt (O, P)	6	4	1	1	37	23	+14	50	Qualification for the promotion play-offs
3	AaFK Fortuna	6	1	2	3	49	19	+30	45	
4	Viking	6	1	0	5	28	37	−9	27	

Source: Norwegian Football Federation (in Norwegian)
Rules for classification: 1) Points; 2) Goal difference; 3) Goals scored; 4) Head-to-head points; 5) Head-to-head goal difference; 6) Head-to-head goals scored.
(C) Champions; (O) Play-off winners; (P) Promoted

=== Results ===
Home \ Away	AFK	BOD	HØN	VIK
AaFK Fortuna	—	0–1	1–1	0–4
Bodø/Glimt	1–0	—	0–5	2–1
Hønefoss	2–2	0–0	—	1–0
Viking	0–1	1–2	1–2	—

Source: Norwegian Football Federation
Legend: Blue = home team win; Yellow = draw; Red = away team win.

== Relegation group ==
Pos	Team	Pld	W	D	L	GF	GA	GD	Pts	Qualification or relegation
1	Avaldsnes	5	4	1	0	25	32	−7	31	
2	Odd	5	3	1	1	35	31	+4	27	
3	Fyllingsdalen	5	2	1	2	26	44	−18	27	
4	KIL/Hemne	5	1	1	3	24	41	−17	23	
5	Tromsø (O)	5	2	1	2	23	35	−12	22	Qualification for the relegation play-offs
6	Øvrevoll Hosle (R)	5	0	1	4	22	48	−26	20	Relegation to Second Division

Source: Norwegian Football Federation (in Norwegian)
Rules for classification: 1) Points; 2) Goal difference; 3) Goals scored; 4) Head-to-head points; 5) Head-to-head goal difference; 6) Head-to-head goals scored.
(O) Play-off winners; (R) Relegated

=== Results ===
Home \ Away	AVA	FYL	KIL	ODD	TRO	ØVR
Avaldsnes	—	—	—	0–0	1–0	3–0
Fyllingsdalen	0–1	—	2–0	—	—	—
KIL/Hemne	0–2	—	—	—	2–0	0–0
Odd	—	3–1	7–0	—	—	4–0
Tromsø	—	1–1	—	3–1	—	—
Øvrevoll Hosle	—	1–2	—	—	0–1	—

Source: Norwegian Football Federation
Legend: Blue = home team win; Yellow = draw; Red = away team win.

== Relegation play-offs ==
20 November 2024
17:00 CET

KFUM	0–1	Tromsø
	Report	Hegg 90'

KFUM Arena, Oslo
Attendance: 117
Referee: Abdulhadi Al-Fahad
24 November 2024
13:00 CET

Tromsø	4–0	KFUM
Hegg 9', 34'; Trøan 72'; Lillegård 81'	Report

Romssa Arena, Tromsø
Referee: Markus Rotvold Hammarstrøm

Tromsø won 5–0 on aggregate. Both clubs remained in their respective leagues.

== Top scorers ==
Rank	Player	Club	Goals
1	(Norway) Kristin Gumaer	Hønefoss	19
2	(Norway) Mali Trøan	TIL 2020	14
3	(Norway) Guro Hammer Røn	Kolbotn	13
4	(Norway) Silje Nyhagen	Hønefoss	12
5	(Norway) Anna Johansen	AaFK Fortuna	10
5	(Denmark) Maria Herdel	Øvrevoll Hosle	10

== Awards ==
Award	Winner	Club
Player of the Year	(United States) Aubrei Corder	Bodø/Glimt
Breakthrough of the Year	(Norway) Kristin Gumaer	Hønefoss
Coach of the Year	(Norway) Martin Lindmark	Hønefoss
