= 2024 Toppserien =

41st season of top women's football (soccer) league in Norway

Toppserien
- Season: 2024
- Dates: 16 March – 16 November
- Champions: Vålerenga
- Relegated: Arna-Bjørnar; Åsane
- Champions League: Vålerenga; Brann
- Europa Cup: Rosenborg
- Matches: 135
- Goals: 376 (2.79 per match)
- Top goalscorer: Anna Aahjem (18 goals)
- Biggest home win: Vålerenga 6–0 Arna-Bjørnar (17 August 2024)
- Biggest away win: Arna-Bjørnar 0–10 Brann (11 May 2024)
- Highest scoring: Arna-Bjørnar 0–10 Brann (11 May 2024)
- Longest winning run: 15 matches Vålerenga
- Longest unbeaten run: 16 matches Vålerenga
- Longest winless run: 19 matches Åsane
- Longest losing run: 8 matches Arna-Bjørnar
- Highest attendance: 6,051; Brann - Rosenborg (5 May 2024)
- Lowest attendance: 109; Arna-Bjørnar - Lyn (24 August 2024)
- Average attendance: 569

The 2024 Toppserien was the 41st season of the highest women's football league in Norway. The season started on 16 March 2024 and ended on 16 November 2024, not including play-off matches.

== Teams ==
Locations of teams in the 2024 Toppserien

Kolbotn were promoted from the 2023 First Division. Arna-Bjørnar were originally relegated from the 2023 Toppserien, but were allowed to stay in the league after Avaldsnes had their sporting license revoked for economic mismanagement, resulting in their relegation instead.

=== Stadiums and locations ===
Team	Location	County	Arena	Turf	Capacity
Arna-Bjørnar	Bergen	Vestland	Arna Idrettspark	Artificial	1,500
Brann	Bergen	Vestland	Brann Stadion (Note: Brann played one home game at Stemmemyren.)	Natural	16,750
Kolbotn	Oslo (Note: While Kolbotn are normally based in Nordre Follo, they are playing their home games in Oslo for the 2024 season.)	Oslo	Grorud Match Kunstgress	Artificial	1,700
LSK Kvinner	Lillestrøm	Akershus	LSK-Hallen	Artificial	1,800
Lyn	Oslo	Oslo	Kringsjå Kunstgress	Artificial	450
Rosenborg	Trondheim	Trøndelag	Koteng Arena (Note: Rosenborg played one home game at Lerkendal.)	Artificial	895
Røa	Oslo	Oslo	Røa Kunstgress	Artificial	450
Stabæk	Bærum	Akershus	Nadderud Stadion	Artificial	4,938
Vålerenga	Oslo	Oslo	Intility Arena	Artificial	16,556
Åsane	Bergen	Vestland	Åsane Arena	Artificial	3,300

=== Personnel and kits ===
Team	Manager	Kit manufacturer	Shirt sponsor
Arna-Bjørnar	(Norway) Erik Mjelde	Nike	Sparebanken Vest
Brann	(England) Martin Ho	Nike	Sparebanken Vest
Kolbotn	(England) Luke Torjussen	Hummel	OBOS
LSK Kvinner	(Norway) André Bergdølmo	Puma	DNB
Lyn	(Norway) Joakim Dragsten	Hummel	OBOS
Rosenborg	(Northern Ireland) Robin Shroot	Adidas	SpareBank 1 SMN
Røa	(Norway) Geir Kristian Nordby	Diadora	OBOS
Stabæk	(Sweden) Jan Jönsson	Nike	SpareBank 1 Østlandet
Vålerenga	(Norway) Nils Lexerød	Adidas	Aprila Bank
Åsane	(Spain) Miki Lladó	Craft	Tertnes Holding

== League table ==
The league consists of 10 teams who play each other three times, totalling 27 matches per team.

Pos	Team	Pld	W	D	L	GF	GA	GD	Pts	Qualification or relegation
1	Vålerenga (C)	27	24	1	2	74	17	+57	73	Qualification for Champions League second qualifying round
2	Brann	27	19	1	7	70	24	+46	58	Qualification for Champions League second qualifying round
3	Rosenborg	27	15	1	11	38	32	+6	46	Qualification for Europa Cup first qualifying round
4	LSK Kvinner (Note: LSK Kvinner were deducted 4 points.)	27	14	6	7	43	31	+12	44	
5	Stabæk	27	11	4	12	40	38	+2	37	
6	Lyn	27	9	6	12	25	41	−16	33	
7	Røa	27	9	2	16	22	37	−15	29	
8	Kolbotn	27	7	5	15	28	55	−27	26	
9	Åsane (R)	27	3	9	15	19	39	−20	18	Qualification for relegation play-offs
10	Arna-Bjørnar (R)	27	2	9	16	17	62	−45	15	Relegation to First Division

Source: NFF (in Norwegian)
Rules for classification: 1) Points; 2) Goal difference; 3) Number of goals scored; 4) Head-to-head points; 5) Head-to-head goal difference; 6) Head-to-head away goals scored
(C) Champions; (R) Relegated

== Positions by round ==
Team ╲ Round	1	2	3	4	5	6	7	8	9	10	11	12	13	14	15	16	17	18	19	20	21	22	23	24	25	26	27
Vålerenga	3	1	1	1	1	1	1	1	1	1	2	1	1	1	1	1	1	1	1	1	1	1	1	1	1	1	1
Brann	6	8	5	4	3	4	3	3	3	3	3	3	3	3	3	3	3	2	2	2	2	2	2	2	2	2	2
Rosenborg	1	2	2	2	2	2	2	2	2	2	1	2	2	2	2	2	2	3	3	3	3	3	3	3	3	4	3
LSK Kvinner	10	10	6	7	6	6	6	6	6	5	6	6	5	5	4	4	4	4	4	4	4	4	4	4	4	3	4
Stabæk	8	4	4	5	5	5	4	5	4	4	4	4	6	6	6	6	6	7	5	5	5	5	5	5	5	5	5
Lyn	4	6	8	6	7	7	7	7	7	7	7	7	7	7	7	7	7	6	7	7	7	6	6	6	7	6	6
Røa	2	3	3	3	4	3	5	4	5	6	5	5	4	4	5	5	5	5	6	6	6	7	7	7	6	7	7
Kolbotn	6	8	10	10	8	8	8	8	8	8	8	8	8	8	8	8	8	8	8	8	8	8	8	8	8	8	8
Åsane	4	5	7	8	9	9	9	9	9	9	9	9	9	9	9	9	9	9	9	9	9	9	9	9	9	9	9
Arna-Bjørnar	9	7	9	9	10	10	10	10	10	10	10	10	10	10	10	10	10	10	10	10	10	10	10	10	10	10	10

Qualification for the Champions League second round
Qualification for the Europa Cup first round
Qualification for the relegation play-offs
Relegation to the First Division

== Results ==
=== Round 1–18 ===
Home \ Away	ARN	BRA	KOL	LSK	LYN	ROS	RØA	STA	VÅL	ÅSA
Arna-Bjørnar	—	0–10	0–2	1–1	1–1	1–2	0–1	1–2	1–3	0–0
Brann	5–1	—	6–0	1–0	2–1	2–1	1–1	0–1	0–2	2–1
Kolbotn	4–1	2–6	—	0–0	2–2	0–1	2–4	1–1	0–1	1–0
LSK Kvinner	3–0	4–2	2–1	—	1–0	3–1	2–1	3–2	0–4	3–1
Lyn	1–0	1–5	0–2	1–0	—	0–1	1–0	1–7	2–0	1–0
Rosenborg	3–0	2–0	3–1	3–2	0–1	—	1–0	1–0	1–2	2–1
Røa	4–0	0–2	2–1	1–0	1–2	1–4	—	1–0	0–2	1–0
Stabæk	1–2	0–1	2–0	0–1	0–0	2–0	1–0	—	2–6	3–2
Vålerenga	6–0	2–0	4–0	1–0	3–1	0–1	5–0	3–1	—	4–1
Åsane	1–1	0–3	1–1	0–0	1–1	1–1	0–1	0–0	0–3	—

Source: Norwegian Football Federation
Legend: Blue = home team win; Yellow = draw; Red = away team win.

=== Round 19–27 ===
Home \ Away	ARN	BRA	KOL	LSK	LYN	ROS	RØA	STA	VÅL	ÅSA
Arna-Bjørnar	—	—	1–2	—	1–1	—	0–0	—	1–3	1–1
Brann	0–1	—	—	—	—	—	4–0	3–0	1–2	1–0
Kolbotn	—	0–5	—	1–3	1–1	2–1	—	—	—	0–2
LSK Kvinner	2–2	0–2	—	—	—	—	1–0	—	—	1–1
Lyn	—	1–3	—	2–5	—	—	1–0	0–1	—	—
Rosenborg	3–0	1–3	—	1–2	0–2	—	—	—	—	1–0
Røa	—	—	0–2	—	—	0–1	—	3–1	0–2	—
Stabæk	0–0	—	3–0	1–3	—	3–1	—	—	—	—
Vålerenga	—	—	3–0	1–1	3–0	3–1	—	3–2	—	—
Åsane	—	—	—	—	1–0	—	1–0	2–4	1–3	—

Source: Norwegian Football Federation
Legend: Blue = home team win; Yellow = draw; Red = away team win.

== Relegation play-offs ==
The ninth placed team faced the second placed team of the First Division in a two-legged play-off to decide who would play in the Toppserien next season.

20 November 2024
19:00 CET

Åsane	0–0	Bodø/Glimt
	Report

Åsane Arena, Bergen
Attendance: 596
Referee: Aleksander Skjold Vermundsen
23 November 2024
12:00 CET

Bodø/Glimt	1–1 (a.e.t.)	Åsane
Falch 53'	Report	Sangolt 5'
Penalties
	3–1

Aspmyra Stadion, Bodø
Attendance: 756
Referee: Henrikke Holm Nervik

1–1 on aggregate. Bodø/Glimt won 3–1 on penalties.

== Season statistics ==
=== Top goalscorers ===
Rank	Player	Club	Goals
1	(Norway) Anna Aahjem	Brann	18
2	(Norway) Iris Omarsdottir	Stabæk	14
3	(Norway) Karina Sævik	Vålerenga	13
3	(Norway) Olaug Tvedten	Vålerenga	13
5	(Norway) Amalie Eikeland	Brann	10
5	(Norway) Marie Moen Preus	Kolbotn	10
7	(Norway) Julie Hoff Klæboe	Røa	9
7	(Norway) Thea Kyvåg	LSK Kvinner	9
9	(Norway) Rakel Engesvik	Brann	8
9	(Norway) Elise Thorsnes	Vålerenga	8

=== Clean sheets ===
Rank	Player	Club	Clean sheets
1	(Sweden) Tove Enblom	Vålerenga	12
2	(Norway) Aurora Mikalsen	Brann	11
3	(Norway) Kirvil Odden	Lyn	9
3	(Norway) Sunniva Skoglund	Stabæk	9
3	(Norway) Rugile Rulyte	Rosenborg	9
6	(Sweden) Louise Högrell	Røa	6
6	(Norway) Savanna Duffy	Åsane	6
8	(Norway) Thiril Erichsen	LSK Kvinner	5
8	(Norway) Selma Panengstuen	Kolbotn	5
10	(Norway) Hanne Larsen	Arna-Bjørnar	4

=== Hat-tricks ===
Player	For	Against	Result	Date
(Norway) Stine Brekken	Vålerenga	Stabæk	6–2 (A)	7 July 2024
(Norway) Olaug Tvedten	Vålerenga	Arna-Bjørnar	6–0 (H)	17 August 2024

=== Discipline ===
==== Player ====
- Most yellow cards: 10
  - (Norway) Nora Nøss (Arna-Bjørnar)
- Most red cards: 1
  - (Norway) Savanna Duffy (Åsane)
  - (Norway) Hanna Rake Ellingsen (Røa)
  - (Norway) Camilla Huseby (LSK Kvinner)
  - (Poland) Milena Kokosz (Åsane)
  - (Norway) Andrine Mo (Åsane)
  - (Norway) Ingrid Stenevik (Brann)

==== Club ====
- Most yellow cards: 39
  - Åsane
- Fewest yellow cards: 9
  - Vålerenga
- Most red cards: 3
  - Åsane
- Fewest red cards: 0
  - Arna-Bjørnar
  - Kolbotn
  - Lyn
  - Rosenborg
  - Vålerenga

== League attendances ==
Pos	Team	Total	High	Low	Average	Change
1	Brann	31,820	6,051	1,337	2,273	+111.2%
2	Rosenborg	9,526	2,862	398	680	−32.3%
3	Vålerenga	8,821	1,152	318	630	+9.8%
4	Stabæk	5,369	1,406	112	413	+54.1%
5	LSK Kvinner	5,020	967	177	386	−3.3%
6	Røa	3,437	487	120	264	−7.4%
7	Arna-Bjørnar	3,419	854	109	244	−11.6%
8	Lyn	3,153	376	167	243	−38.6%
9	Åsane	3,038	690	150	234	−8.9%
10	Kolbotn	3,165	347	125	226	+44.9%^{1}
	League total	76,768	6,051	109	569	+17.6%

Source: nifs.no
Notes:
1: Team played last season in 1. divisjon.
