= Marit Bratberg Lund =

Norwegian footballer (born 1997)

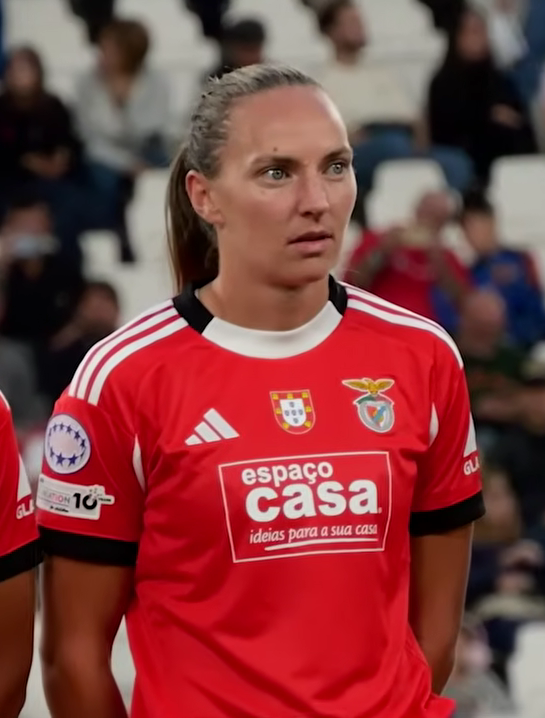
- Lund with Benfica in 2025

Personal information
- Date of birth: 7 November 1997 (age 29)
- Place of birth: Norway
- Height: 1.67 m (5 ft 6 in)
- Position: Defender

Team information
- Current team: Benfica
- Number: 5

Youth career
- Ilseng

Senior career*
Years	Team	Apps	(Gls)
2013–2014	Fart	29	(9)
2014–2020	Kolbotn	98	(15)
2021	Sandviken	11	(4)
2022–2024	Brann	39	(14)
2024–	Benfica	26	(2)

International career^{‡}
2012	Norway U15	3	(0)
2012–2013	Norway U16	10	(4)
2013–2014	Norway U17	7	(4)
2014–2016	Norway U19	25	(6)
2015–2021	Norway U23	15	(4)
2022–	Norway	22	(1)
- * Club domestic league appearances and goals as of 31 August 2024 ‡ National team caps and goals as of 3 July 2025

Marit Bratberg Lund (born 7 November 1997) is a Norwegian footballer who plays for Campeonato Nacional Feminino club Benfica.

== Career ==
She hails from Ilseng and started her youth career in Ilseng IL. She started her senior career in FL Fart. In mid-2014 she moved on to Kolbotn IL in the first division, and ahead of the 2021 season to IL Sandviken. She was also a prolific Norway youth international.

Sandviken, whom she joined in 2021, led the league and eventually became league champions. With 14 assists and 7 goals from her left wing-back position, she was an important contributor to the gold team. She was named player of the year in the 2021 Toppserien both in the official selection, by Norwegian News Agency, and during the NISO Awards. Several football experts and pundits suggested that she be called up to the full national team, and expressed a failure to understand why no call-up came in 2021. Lund was called the best left-footed footballer in Norway. She ranked highest on the score table of the Norwegian News Agency, praising her attacking capabilities.

== International career ==
On 19 June 2023, she was included in the 23-player Norwegian squad for the FIFA Women's World Cup 2023.

On 16 June 2025, Lund was called up to the Norway squad for the UEFA Women's Euro 2025.

== International goals ==
Scores and results list Norway's goal tally first.

No.	Date	Venue	Opponent	Score	Result	Competition
1.	27 October 2023	Ullevaal Stadium, Oslo, Norway	France	1–0	1–2	2023–24 UEFA Nations League A

== Honours ==
Sandviken/Brann

- Toppserien: 2021, 2022
