= 2022 Toppserien =

39th season of top women's football (soccer) league in Norway

Toppserien
- Season: 2022
- Champions: Brann
- Relegated: TIL 2020; Kolbotn
- Champions League: Brann; Vålerenga
- Matches: 130
- Goals: 399 (3.07 per match)
- Top goalscorer: Elise Thorsnes (19 goals)
- Biggest home win: Brann 10–0 Avaldsnes (15 May 2022)
- Biggest away win: Arna-Bjørnar 0–6 Brann (3 August 2022); TIL 2020 0–6 Arna-Bjørnar (16 October 2022)
- Highest scoring: Brann 10–0 Avaldsnes (15 May 2022); Vålerenga 9–1 Arna-Bjørnar (22 May 2022)
- Highest attendance: 11,636; Rosenborg 1–0 Brann (12 June 2022)
- Lowest attendance: 60; Kolbotn 0–1 Åsane (16 October 2022)

The 2022 Toppserien was the 39th season of the highest women's football league in Norway. The season started on 20 March 2022.

== Format ==
This season is the first with a new play-off system. It was set to be introduced in the 2020 season, but it was postponed due to the COVID-19 pandemic.

== Teams ==
Locations of teams in the 2022 Toppserien

The defending champions Sandviken changed their name to Brann. Røa were promoted from the 2021 First Division.

Team	Municipality	Home ground
Arna-Bjørnar	Bergen Municipality	Arna Idrettspark
Avaldsnes	Karmøy Municipality	Avaldsnes Idrettssenter
Brann	Bergen Municipality	Stemmemyren; Brann Stadion
Kolbotn	Nordre Follo Municipality	Sofiemyr Stadion; KFUM Arena
LSK Kvinner	Lillestrøm Municipality	LSK-Hallen
Lyn	Oslo Municipality	Kringsjå Kunstgress; Grorud Match Kunstgress
Rosenborg	Trondheim Municipality	Koteng Arena; Lerkendal Stadion
Røa	Oslo Municipality	Røa Kunstgress
Stabæk	Bærum Municipality	Nadderud Stadion
Vålerenga	Oslo Municipality	Intility Arena

== Regular season ==
In the regular season, the league consists of 10 teams, who play each other twice, totalling 18 matches per team. The top four teams qualify for the championship round, while the bottom six qualify for the relegation round, along with the top two teams from the First Division.

Pos	Team	Pld	W	D	L	GF	GA	GD	Pts	Qualification
1	Brann	18	14	3	1	53	13	+40	45	Qualification for the championship round
2	Rosenborg	18	13	2	3	40	12	+28	41	Qualification for the championship round
3	Vålerenga	18	12	3	3	48	12	+36	39	Qualification for the championship round
4	Stabæk	18	8	3	7	23	22	+1	27	Qualification for the championship round
5	Kolbotn	18	8	2	8	27	22	+5	26	Qualification for the relegation round
6	Lyn	18	7	5	6	22	26	−4	26	Qualification for the relegation round
7	LSK Kvinner	18	6	5	7	23	21	+2	23	Qualification for the relegation round
8	Arna-Bjørnar	18	4	2	12	18	53	−35	14	Qualification for the relegation round
9	Avaldsnes	18	3	2	13	15	50	−35	11	Qualification for the relegation round
10	Røa	18	0	3	15	9	47	−38	3	Qualification for the relegation round

Source: NIFS (in Norwegian)
Rules for classification: 1) Points; 2) Goal difference; 3) Number of goals scored; 4) Head-to-head points; 5) Head-to-head goal difference; 6) Head-to-head away goals scored

=== Results ===
Home \ Away	ARN	AVA	BRA	KOL	LSK	LYN	ROS	RØA	STA	VÅL
Arna-Bjørnar	—	2–1	0–6	0–5	1–0	1–2	2–4	2–1	1–2	0–3
Avaldsnes	0–3	—	1–2	0–3	0–2	2–2	1–3	1–1	0–1	0–3
Brann	7–0	10–0	—	2–1	3–3	4–0	2–1	2–0	1–1	1–0
Kolbotn	2–0	0–3 (Note: The match between Kolbotn and Avaldsnes was first postponed due to the bad condition of the pitch. Avaldsnes were later awarded a 3–0 win on walkover.)	1–2	—	2–1	0–1	0–2	1–0	1–1	3–1
LSK Kvinner	2–0	1–2	0–1	3–2	—	0–0	0–0	1–1	2–0	0–3
Lyn	1–1	3–2	0–2	1–1	1–3	—	2–1	3–1	1–2	1–3
Rosenborg	4–1	6–0	1–0	2–0	1–0	0–1	—	5–0	1–0	2–0
Røa	2–2	0–2	2–5	1–4	0–3	0–2	0–3	—	0–3	0–4
Stabæk	2–1	2–0	1–2	0–1	3–1	1–1	2–3	1–0	—	1–4
Vålerenga	9–1	6–0	1–1	2–0	1–1	2–0	1–1	3–0	2–0	—

Source: Norwegian Football Federation
Legend: Blue = home team win; Yellow = draw; Red = away team win.

== Championship round ==
In the championship round, the four teams started with 6, 4, 2 and 0 points respectively, based on their position in the regular season. They played each other twice, totaling six matches per team. The winners and runners-up qualified for the first qualifying round of the Champions League.

Pos	Team	Pld	W	D	L	GF	GA	GD	Pts	Qualification
1	Brann (C)	6	4	2	0	10	4	+6	20	Qualification for the Champions League first round
2	Vålerenga	6	4	1	1	16	3	+13	15	Qualification for the Champions League first round
3	Rosenborg	6	2	1	3	7	8	−1	11	
4	Stabæk	6	0	0	6	2	20	−18	0	

Source: NIFS (in Norwegian)
Rules for classification: 1) Points; 2) Goal difference; 3) Number of goals scored; 4) Head-to-head points; 5) Head-to-head goal difference; 6) Head-to-head away goals scored
(C) Champions

=== Results ===
Home \ Away	BRA	ROS	STA	VÅL
Brann	—	1–1	3–0	1–1
Rosenborg	1–2	—	3–1	0–1
Stabæk	0–1	1–2	—	0–5
Vålerenga	1–2	2–0	6–0	—

Source: Norwegian Football Federation
Legend: Blue = home team win; Yellow = draw; Red = away team win.

== Relegation round ==
In the relegation round, all eight teams start with 0 points. Each team plays seven matches. A draw decides which teams get three home matches and which teams get four home matches. The bottom two teams are relegated, while the sixth placed team takes part in a relegation play-off against the first placed team of the First Division play-offs.

Pos	Team	Pld	W	D	L	GF	GA	GD	Pts	Qualification or relegation
1	Lyn	7	4	3	0	14	8	+6	15	
2	Arna-Bjørnar	7	4	2	1	17	6	+11	14	
3	LSK Kvinner	7	3	2	2	14	9	+5	11	
4	Åsane	7	3	1	3	4	9	−5	10	
5	Røa	7	2	2	3	12	11	+1	8	
6	Avaldsnes (O)	7	2	1	4	10	11	−1	7	Qualification for the relegation play-offs
7	TIL 2020 (R)	7	2	1	4	7	19	−12	7	Relegation to First Division
8	Kolbotn (R)	7	1	2	4	8	13	−5	5	Relegation to First Division

Source: NIFS (in Norwegian)
Rules for classification: 1) Points; 2) Goal difference; 3) Number of goals scored; 4) Head-to-head points; 5) Head-to-head goal difference; 6) Head-to-head away goals scored
(O) Play-off winners; (R) Relegated

=== Results ===
Home \ Away	ARN	AVA	KOL	LSK	LYN	RØA	TIL	ÅSA
Arna-Bjørnar	—	3–1	—	—	2–2	3–0	—	—
Avaldsnes	—	—	—	0–2	—	2–1	5–1	0–1
Kolbotn	3–1	1–1	—	2–2	—	—	—	0–1
LSK Kvinner	0–2	—	—	—	2–3	—	—	2–0
Lyn	—	2–1	3–1	—	—	1–1	1–1	—
Røa	—	—	2–1	2–2	—	—	1–2	—
TIL 2020	0–6	—	3–0	0–4	—	—	—	0–2
Åsane	0–0	—	—	—	0–2	0–5	—	—

Source: Norwegian Football Federation
Legend: Blue = home team win; Yellow = draw; Red = away team win.

== Relegation play-offs ==
The sixth placed team of the relegation round, Avaldsnes, faced the first placed team of the First Division play-offs, Øvrevoll Hosle, in a two-legged play-off to decide who would play in the 2023 Toppserien.

6 November 2022
14:00 CET

Øvrevoll Hosle	1–1	Avaldsnes
Vassanyi 87'	Report	Ellingsen 8' (o.g.)

Ferd Arena Hosle, Bærum
Attendance: 1,032
Referee: Marit Buhaug Folstad
19 November 2022
13:00 CET

Avaldsnes	2–1 (a.e.t.)	Øvrevoll Hosle
Santos 8'; Olsen 116'	Report	Larsen 60'

Avaldsnes Idrettsenter, Avaldsnes
Attendance: 1,230
Referee: Sondre Brudvik

Avaldsnes won 3–2 on aggregate and both teams remained in their respective leagues.

== Season statistics ==
=== Top scorers ===
As of 28 August 2022

Rank	Player	Club	Goals
1	(Norway) Elise Thorsnes	Vålerenga	15
2	(Norway) Elisabeth Terland	Brann	10
3	(Norway) Anna Aahjem	Lyn	7
3	(Norway) Tonje Pedersen	Kolbotn	7
5	(Norway) Maria Brochmann	Brann	6
5	(Norway) Sara Kanutte Fornes	Rosenborg	6
5	(Norway) Emma Stølen Godø	LSK Kvinner	6
5	(Denmark) Janni Thomsen	Vålerenga	6
5	(Norway) Olaug Tvedten	Vålerenga	6

=== Awards ===
Best XI
Goalkeeper	(Norway) Sunniva Skoglund (Stabæk)			
Defenders	(Denmark) Janni Thomsen (Vålerenga)	(Norway) Tuva Hansen (Brann)	(Norway) Guro Bergsvand (Brann)	(Norway) Marit Bratberg Lund (Brann)
Midfielders	(Norway) Kamilla Melgård (Lyn)	(Norway) Emilie Joramo (Rosenborg)	(Norway) Justine Kielland (Stabæk)	(Norway) Anna Jøsendal (Rosenborg)
Forwards	(Norway) Elisabeth Terland (Brann)		(Norway) Elise Thorsnes (Vålerenga)	
