= 2018 Toppserien =

Toppserien
- Season: 2018
- Champions: LSK Kvinner
- Relegated: Grand Bodø
- Champions League: LSK Kvinner
- Matches: 132
- Goals: 443 (3.36 per match)
- Top goalscorer: Guro Reiten (21 goals)
- Biggest home win: Klepp 6–0 Grand Bodø (22 April)
- Biggest away win: Vålerenga 0–5 LSK Kvinner (24 March)
- Highest scoring: Trondheims-Ørn 2–6 Arna-Bjørnar (13 May); Grand Bodø 3–5 Klepp (16 September)
- Total attendance: 33,641
- Average attendance: 254 ▲6.7%

The 2018 Toppserien was the 35th season of the highest women's football league in Norway. LSK Kvinner entered the season as the defending champions.

LSK Kvinner won their fifth consecutive title with five matchdays to spare.

== Teams ==
Locations of teams in the 2018 Toppserien

Team	Home city	Home ground	In Toppserien since	First appearance	Seasons
Arna-Bjørnar	Ytre Arna (Bergen)	Arna Idrettspark	2006	2001	17
Avaldsnes	Avaldsnes	Avaldsnes Idrettssenter	2013	2013	6
Grand Bodø	Bodø	Aspmyra Stadion	2017	1987	11
Klepp	Kleppe (Stavanger)	Klepp Stadion	1987	1987	32
Kolbotn	Kolbotn (Oslo)	Sofiemyr	1995	1995	24
LSK Kvinner	Lillestrøm (Oslo)	LSK-Hallen	1987	1987	32
Lyn	Oslo	Kringsjå kunstgress	2018	2018	1
Røa	Røa (Oslo)	Røa kunstgress	2000	2000	19
Sandviken	Bergen	Stemmemyren	2015	1987	25
Stabæk	Bærum (Oslo)	Nadderud Stadion	2009	2009	10
Trondheims-Ørn	Trondheim	DnB Nor Arena	1987	1987	32
Vålerenga	Oslo	Vallhall Arena	2012	2012	7

== League table ==
Pos	Team	Pld	W	D	L	GF	GA	GD	Pts	Qualification or relegation
1	LSK Kvinner (C)	22	20	1	1	71	15	+56	61	Qualification for the Champions League qualifying round
2	Klepp	22	15	3	4	39	21	+18	48	
3	Arna-Bjørnar	22	11	6	5	53	26	+27	39	
4	Sandviken	22	11	6	5	42	29	+13	39	
5	Kolbotn	22	11	6	5	34	35	−1	39	
6	Vålerenga	22	10	3	9	37	35	+2	33	
7	Røa	22	10	2	10	42	42	0	31 (Note: Røa was deducted one point.)	
8	Stabæk	22	7	2	13	29	37	−8	23	
9	Avaldsnes	22	5	6	11	24	38	−14	21	
10	Trondheims-Ørn	22	4	6	12	25	48	−23	18	
11	Lyn (O)	22	3	3	16	27	56	−29	12	Qualification for relegation play-offs
12	Grand Bodø (R)	22	2	2	18	20	61	−41	8	Relegation to First Division

Source: Norges Fotballforbund (in Norwegian)
Rules for classification: 1) Points; 2) Goal difference; 3) Number of goals scored; 4) Head-to-head points; 5) Head-to-head goal difference; 6) Head-to-head away goals scored
(C) Champions; (O) Play-off winners; (R) Relegated

== Top scorers ==
Rank	Player	Club	Goals
1	(Norway) Guro Reiten	LSK Kvinner	21
2	(Cameroon) Ajara Nchout	Sandviken	15
3	(Norway) Maria Brochmann	Arna-Bjørnar	14
3	(Iceland) Svava Rós Guðmundsdóttir	Røa	14
3	(Norway) Sophie Haug	LSK Kvinner	14
6	(Norway) Hege Hansen	Klepp	10
6	(Norway) Ingrid Byrøygard Kvernvolden	LSK Kvinner	10
8	(Norway) Julie Skjeflo Adserø	Trondheims-Ørn	9
8	(Norway) Melissa Bjånesøy	Stabæk	9
8	(Norway) Amalie Eikeland	Arna-Bjørnar	9
8	(Norway) Linn Huseby	Lyn	9
8	(Netherlands) Sherida Spitse	Vålerenga	9
8	(Norway) Karina Sævik	Kolbotn	9

== Individual awards ==
At the end of the year Norwegian Football awards Guro Reiten of LSK Kvinner won the 2018 Golden Boot, 2018 Player of the Year and 2018 Goal of the Year awards.
