= 2023 Toppserien =

40th season of top women's football (soccer) league in Norway

Toppserien
- Season: 2023
- Dates: 25 March – 12 November
- Champions: Vålerenga
- Relegated: Avaldsnes
- Champions League: Vålerenga; Rosenborg

The 2023 Toppserien was the 40th season of the highest women's football league in Norway. The season started on 25 March 2023 and ended on 12 November 2023. The season did not include championship and relegation playoffs rounds which were scrapped after only one season. Instead, the league schedule was increased by nine matches per team with each team playing each other three times instead of twice.

== Teams ==
Locations of teams in the 2023 Toppserien

Åsane were promoted from the 2022 First Division.

| Team | Municipality | Home ground |
|---|---|---|
| Arna-Bjørnar | Bergen Municipality | Arna Idrettspark |
| Avaldsnes | Karmøy Municipality | Avaldsnes Idrettssenter |
| Brann | Bergen Municipality | Stemmemyren; Brann Stadion |
| LSK Kvinner | Lillestrøm Municipality | LSK-Hallen |
| Lyn | Oslo Municipality | Kringsjå Kunstgress |
| Rosenborg | Trondheim Municipality | Koteng Arena; Lerkendal Stadion |
| Røa | Oslo Municipality | Røa Kunstgress |
| Stabæk | Bærum Municipality | Nadderud Stadion |
| Vålerenga | Oslo Municipality | Intility Arena |
| Åsane | Bergen Municipality | Åsane Arena |

== League table ==
The league consists of 10 teams who play each other three times, totalling 27 matches per team.

| Pos | Team | Pld | W | D | L | GF | GA | GD | Pts | Qualification or relegation |
|---|---|---|---|---|---|---|---|---|---|---|
| 1 | Vålerenga (C) | 27 | 17 | 8 | 2 | 68 | 28 | +40 | 59 | Qualification for the Champions League first round |
| 2 | Rosenborg | 27 | 18 | 5 | 4 | 57 | 15 | +42 | 58 (Note: Rosenborg were deducted 1 point.) | Qualification for the Champions League first round |
| 3 | LSK Kvinner | 27 | 16 | 7 | 4 | 44 | 21 | +23 | 55 | |
| 4 | Brann | 27 | 13 | 7 | 7 | 52 | 30 | +22 | 46 | |
| 5 | Stabæk | 27 | 10 | 7 | 10 | 41 | 43 | −2 | 37 | |
| 6 | Lyn | 27 | 7 | 7 | 13 | 33 | 44 | −11 | 28 | |
| 7 | Røa | 27 | 6 | 9 | 12 | 33 | 43 | −10 | 27 | |
| 8 | Åsane | 27 | 7 | 4 | 16 | 29 | 50 | −21 | 25 | |
| 9 | Avaldsnes (Note: Avaldsnes did not receive a Toppserien licence for the 2024 season and were relegated to the First Division. The last Toppserien spot was given to Arna-Bjørnar.) (O, R) | 27 | 5 | 6 | 16 | 18 | 63 | −45 | 21 | Qualification for the relegation play-offs |
| 10 | Arna-Bjørnar | 27 | 4 | 4 | 19 | 32 | 70 | −38 | 16 | |

Source: NFF (in Norwegian)
Rules for classification: 1) Points; 2) Goal difference; 3) Number of goals scored; 4) Head-to-head points; 5) Head-to-head goal difference; 6) Head-to-head away goals scored
(C) Champions; (O) Play-off winners; (R) Relegated

== Results ==
=== Round 1–18 ===
| Home \ Away | ARN | AVA | BRA | LSK | LYN | ROS | RØA | STA | VÅL | ÅSA |
|---|---|---|---|---|---|---|---|---|---|---|
| Arna-Bjørnar | — | 2–3 | 2–3 | 0–1 | 1–3 | 0–1 | 1–1 | 4–2 | 1–4 | 1–1 |
| Avaldsnes | 2–4 | — | 0–0 | 1–0 | 2–1 | 1–1 | 0–0 | 0–0 | 1–1 | 0–1 |
| Brann | 1–2 | 3–0 | — | 0–2 | 1–0 | 1–4 | 5–2 | 0–0 | 2–3 | 3–2 |
| LSK Kvinner | 3–0 | 4–0 | 0–0 | — | 2–0 | 1–2 | 1–1 | 3–2 | 2–0 | 3–1 |
| Lyn | 2–2 | 6–0 | 1–2 | 3–1 | — | 2–0 | 1–0 | 0–2 | 0–2 | 1–1 |
| Rosenborg | 4–0 | 6–0 | 2–0 | 0–1 | 3–0 | — | 1–0 | 3–0 | 0–0 | 2–0 |
| Røa | 4–1 | 2–1 | 2–1 | 0–1 | 1–0 | 0–3 | — | 1–1 | 3–3 | 1–3 |
| Stabæk | 5–1 | 1–0 | 1–3 | 0–0 | 2–1 | 1–5 | 2–2 | — | 0–2 | 1–0 |
| Vålerenga | 5–0 | 4–0 | 1–1 | 4–1 | 4–0 | 3–1 | 2–1 | 4–1 | — | 5–1 |
| Åsane | 2–0 | 5–1 | 0–2 | 0–3 | 4–0 | 0–3 | 0–4 | 1–3 | 1–4 | — |

Source: Norwegian Football Federation
Legend: Blue = home team win; Yellow = draw; Red = away team win.

=== Round 19–27 ===
| Home \ Away | ARN | AVA | BRA | LSK | LYN | ROS | RØA | STA | VÅL | ÅSA |
|---|---|---|---|---|---|---|---|---|---|---|
| Arna-Bjørnar | — | — | 0–4 | 0–3 | 2–2 | — | 3–0 | — | — | — |
| Avaldsnes | 3–2 | — | 0–8 | — | — | — | 1–0 | — | — | 1–2 |
| Brann | — | — | — | 2–2 | — | 2–0 | 0–0 | 4–0 | — | — |
| LSK Kvinner | — | 1–0 | — | — | 1–1 | 1–1 | — | — | — | 2–0 |
| Lyn | — | 2–0 | 3–2 | — | — | 0–2 | — | 1–1 | 0–3 | — |
| Rosenborg | 4–0 | 1–1 | — | — | — | — | — | 1–1 | 3–0 | 1–0 |
| Røa | — | — | — | 0–1 | 2–2 | 0–3 | — | — | 2–2 | 2–0 |
| Stabæk | 1–0 | 5–0 | — | 1–2 | — | — | 4–2 | — | — | 3–0 |
| Vålerenga | 4–2 | 1–0 | 1–1 | 2–2 | — | — | — | 3–1 | — | — |
| Åsane | 2–1 | — | 0–1 | — | 1–1 | — | — | — | 1–1 | — |

Source: Norwegian Football Federation
Legend: Blue = home team win; Yellow = draw; Red = away team win.

== Relegation play-offs ==
The ninth placed team faced the second placed team of the First Division in a two-legged play-off to decide who would play in the Toppserien next season.

22 November 2023
18:00 CET

| TIL 2020 | 0–2 | Avaldsnes |
|---|---|---|
| | Report | Olsen 70'; Hovmark 72' |

Romssa Arena, Tromsø
Attendance: 730
Referee: Marit Skurdal
26 November 2023
13:00 CET

| Avaldsnes | 1–2 | TIL 2020 |
|---|---|---|
| Natvik 20' | Report | Tunes 18'; Birkelund 27' |

Åsebøen Stadion, Karmøy
Referee: Jørgen Haga

Avaldsnes won 3–2 on aggregate.

== Awards ==
Best XI
| Goalkeeper | (Norway) Cecilie Fiskerstrand (LSK Kvinner) | | | |
| Defenders | (Denmark) Janni Thomsen (Vålerenga) | (Norway) Mia Authen (LSK Kvinner) | (Norway) Mathilde Harviken (Rosenborg) | (Norway) Marit Bratberg Lund (Brann) |
| Midfielders | (Norway) Thea Bjelde (Vålerenga) | | (Norway) Emma Stølen Godø (LSK Kvinner) | (Norway) Olaug Tvedten (Vålerenga) |
| Forwards | (Norway) Karina Sævik (Vålerenga) | | (Norway) Mimmi Löfwenius (Vålerenga) | (Norway) Anna Aahjem (Lyn) |

== League attendances ==
| Pos | Team | Total | High | Low | Average | Change |
|---|---|---|---|---|---|---|
| 1 | Brann | 13,982 | 3,723 | 450 | 1,076 | −41.6% |
| 2 | Rosenborg | 14,069 | 4,719 | 300 | 1,005 | −38.9% |
| 3 | Vålerenga | 8,036 | 955 | 304 | 574 | −27.0% |
| 4 | LSK Kvinner | 5,188 | 1,461 | 118 | 399 | −5.9% |
| 5 | Lyn | 5,547 | 2,514 | 102 | 396 | +52.3% |
| 6 | Avaldsnes | 3,897 | 570 | 157 | 300 | −28.7% |
| 7 | Røa | 3,995 | 489 | 116 | 285 | +14.5% |
| 8 | Arna-Bjørnar | 3,588 | 823 | 120 | 276 | −8.9% |
| 9 | Stabæk | 3,752 | 367 | 151 | 268 | −27.8% |
| 10 | Åsane | 3,338 | 555 | 100 | 257 | +129.5%^{1} |
| | League total | 65,392 | 4,719 | 100 | 484 | −7.1% |

Updated to games played on 18 November 2023
Notes:
1: Team played last season in 1 Divisjon.
