= Norwegian Women's Cup =

- Founded: 1978
- Region: Norway
- Teams: 54
- Current champions: Vålerenga (4th title)
- Most championships: Rosenborg (9 titles)
- Website: fotball.no/turnering (in Norwegian)
- 2025 Norwegian Women's Cup

The Norwegian Women's Cup (Norwegian: Norgesmesterskapet i fotball for kvinner) is a knockout cup competition in Norwegian women's football. It has been organised annually since 1978. The final is usually played on a Saturday, the day before the men's cup final. The current champions are Vålerenga, who won their fourth title in 2025.

== List of finals ==
The finals so far:

Season	Winner	Score	Runner-up
1978	BUL	1–1 (5–4 pen.)	Trondheims-Ørn
1979	BUL	4–1	Sprint/Jeløy
1980	BUL	1–1 a.e.t. 2–0 Replay	Trondheims-Ørn
1981	Bøler	2–1	BUL
1982	BUL	2–1 (a.e.t)	Sprint/Jeløy
1983	BUL	2–1	Sprint/Jeløy
1984	Asker	2–1	Sprint/Jeløy
1985	Sprint/Jeløy	1–0	Asker
1986	Sprint/Jeløy	3–0	Trondheims-Ørn
1987	Sprint/Jeløy	2–1	Klepp
1988	Sprint/Jeløy	1–0	Asker
1989	Klepp	2–1	Trondheims-Ørn
1990	Asker	5–1	Sprint/Jeløy
1991	Asker	8–0	Sandviken
1992	Setskog/Høland	3–0	Asker
1993	Trondheims-Ørn	3–2	Asker
1994	Trondheims-Ørn	5–1	Donn
1995	Sandviken	3–2 (a.e.t)	Trondheims-Ørn
1996	Trondheims-Ørn	3–0	Klepp
1997	Trondheims-Ørn	6–1	Klepp
1998	Trondheims-Ørn	4–0	Kolbotn
1999	Trondheims-Ørn	1–0	Athene Moss
2000	Asker	4–1	Bjørnar
2001	Trondheims-Ørn	3–2	Asker
2002	Trondheims-Ørn	4–3 (a.e.t)	Arna-Bjørnar
2003	Medkila	2–1	Kolbotn
2004	Røa	2–1	Asker
2005	Asker	4–0 (a.e.t)	Team Strømmen
2006	Røa	3–2	Asker
2007	Kolbotn	4–2	Asker
2008	Røa	3–1	Team Strømmen
2009	Røa	1–0	Team Strømmen
2010	Røa	7–0	Trondheims-Ørn
2011	Stabæk	2–2 a.e.t. (5–4 pen.)	Røa
2012	Stabæk	4–0	Røa
2013	Stabæk	1–0	Avaldsnes
2014	LSK Kvinner	3–1	Trondheims-Ørn
2015	LSK Kvinner	3–2	Avaldsnes
2016	LSK Kvinner	2–0	Røa
2017	Avaldsnes	1–0	Vålerenga
2018	LSK Kvinner	4–0	Sandviken
2019	LSK Kvinner	5–1	Vålerenga
2020	Vålerenga	2–0 a.e.t.	LSK Kvinner
2021	Vålerenga	2–1	Sandviken
2022	Brann	3–1	Stabæk
2023	Rosenborg	1–0	Vålerenga
2024	Vålerenga	1–0	Rosenborg
2025	Vålerenga	2–0	Rosenborg

=== Performance by club ===
Club	Winners	Runners-up	Winning years	Years as runners-up
Rosenborg (formerly Trondheims-Ørn)	9	9	1993, 1994, 1996, 1997, 1998, 1999, 2001, 2002, 2023	1978, 1980, 1986, 1989, 1995, 2010, 2014, 2024, 2025
LSK Kvinner (formerly Setskog/Høland and Team Strømmen)	6	4	1992, 2014, 2015, 2016, 2018, 2019	2005, 2008, 2009, 2020
Asker	5	8	1984, 1990, 1991, 2000, 2005	1985, 1988, 1992, 1993, 2001, 2004, 2006, 2007
Røa	5	3	2004, 2006, 2008, 2009, 2010	2011, 2012, 2016
BUL	5	1	1978, 1979, 1980, 1982, 1983	1981
Sprint/Jeløy	4	5	1985, 1986, 1987, 1988	1979, 1982, 1983, 1984, 1990
Vålerenga	4	3	2020, 2021, 2024, 2025	2017, 2019, 2023
Stabæk	3	1	2011, 2012, 2013	2022
Brann (formerly Sandviken)	2	3	1995, 2022	1991, 2018, 2021
Klepp	1	3	1989	1987, 1996, 1997
Kolbotn	1	2	2007	1998, 2003
Avaldsnes	1	2	2017	2013, 2015
Bøler	1	–	1981	–
Medkila	1	–	2003	–
Arna-Bjørnar (formerly Bjørnar)	–	2	–	2000, 2002
Donn	–	1	–	1994
Athene Moss	–	1	–	1999

== See also ==
- Norwegian Football Cup
