= 2026 Orlando Pride season =

Orlando Pride
2026 season
- Head coach: Seb Hines (until 31 August 2026); Yolanda Thomas (interim; from 31 August 2026)
- Stadium: Inter.co Stadium; Orlando, Florida
- NWSL: 11th
- Playoffs: DNQ
- Top goalscorer: Barbra Banda (17 goals)
- Highest home attendance: 16,320 (Mar 15 vs. SEA)
- Lowest home attendance: 6,004 (Jul 15 vs. BOS)
- Average home league attendance: 8,249
- Biggest win: CHI 0–3 ORL 3/25
- Biggest defeat: ORL 1–3 SD (10/2)
Home colors	Away colors
- All statistics correct as of November 1, 2026.

The 2026 Orlando Pride season was the Orlando Pride's 11th season in the National Women's Soccer League, the top division of women's soccer in the United States.

== Season summary ==
On August 31, 2026, the club announced that they had parted ways with Seb Hines, with Yolanda Thomas taking over as interim manager.

== Roster ==
As of July 11, 2026

No.	Nationality	Name	Position(s)	Date of birth (age)	Previous club	Notes
Goalkeepers
31	(United States)	Cara Martin	GK	February 11, 2004 (age 22)	(United States) Georgetown Hoyas	–
40	(United States)	McKinley Crone	GK	October 20, 1998 (age 28)	(United States) Alabama Crimson Tide	–
77	(United States)	Cosette Morché	GK	June 29, 1997 (age 29)	(United States) Fort Lauderdale United FC	–
	(England)	Anna Moorhouse	GK	March 30, 1995 (age 31)	(France) Bordeaux	–
Defenders
3	(United States)	Kylie Nadaner	DF	March 18, 1992 (age 34)	(Spain) Atlético Madrid	ML
4	(Brazil)	Rafaelle Souza	DF	June 18, 1991 (age 35)	(England) Arsenal	–
5	(United States)	Hailie Mace	DF	March 24, 1997 (age 29)	(United States) Kansas City Current	–
12	(United States)	Cori Dyke	DF	September 20, 2000 (age 26)	(United States) Penn State Nittany Lions	–
16	(Canada)	Zara Chavoshi	DF	December 6, 2002 (age 23)	(United States) Wake Forest Demon Deacons	–
21	(Spain)	Oihane Hernández	DF	May 4, 2000 (age 26)	(Spain) Real Madrid	INT
23	(Nigeria)	Nicole Payne	DF	January 18, 2001 (age 25)	(United States) Portland Thorns	–
25	(United States)	Kerry Abello	DF	September 17, 1999 (age 27)	(United States) Penn State Nittany Lions	–
41	(United States)	Hannah Anderson	DF	April 3, 2001 (age 25)	(United States) Chicago Stars FC	–
Midfielders
2	(United States)	Haley McCutcheon	MF	February 22, 1996 (age 30)	(United States) Houston Dash	–
6	(United States)	Ally Lemos	MF	March 4, 2004 (age 22)	(United States) UCLA Bruins	–
7	(Brazil)	Angelina	MF	January 26, 2000 (age 26)	(United States) Seattle Reign FC	–
8	(Brazil)	Luana	MF	May 2, 1993 (age 33)	(Brazil) Corinthians	INT
14	(United States)	Viviana Villacorta	MF	February 2, 1999 (age 27)	(United States) UCLA Bruins	D-45
Forwards
10	(Brazil)	Marta	FW	February 19, 1986 (age 40)	(Sweden) FC Rosengård	–
11	(Zambia)	Barbra Banda	FW	March 20, 2000 (age 26)	(China) Shanghai Shengli	INT
13	(Mexico)	Jacqueline Ovalle	FW	October 19, 1999 (age 27)	(Mexico) Tigres	–
18	(Brazil)	Gabi Nunes	FW	March 10, 1997 (age 29)	(England) Aston Villa	INT
20	(United States)	Julie Doyle	FW	August 30, 1998 (age 28)	(United States) Santa Clara Broncos	–
28	(United States)	Summer Yates	FW	June 17, 2000 (age 26)	(United States) Washington Huskies	–
29	(Jamaica)	Solai Washington	FW	October 1, 2005 (age 21)	(United States) Florida State Seminoles	–
30	(United States)	Seven Castain	FW	April 26, 2004 (age 22)	(United States) TCU Horned Frogs	–
80	(United States)	Simone Jackson	FW	January 28, 2003 (age 23)	(United States) USC Trojans	–

== Staff ==
As of July 11, 2026.

Executive
Majority owner and chairman	(United States) Mark Wilf
Majority owner and vice-chair	(United States) Zygi Wilf
Majority owner and vice-chair	(United States) Leonard Wilf
President of business operations	(United States) Jarrod Dillon
VP of Soccer Operations & General manager	(United States) Caitlin Carducci
Technical Director	(England) Mark Wilson
Coaching staff
Head coach	(Sweden) Yolanda Thomas
Assistant coach	(Jamaica) Giles Barnes
Goalkeeper coach	(England) Paul Crichton
Player development coach	(England) Scott Sutter
Director of Team Operations & Player Affairs	(United States) Emma Nunan
Director of Medical & Performance	(United States) Nicole Surdyka
Head of Rehabilitation	(United States) Erin Angelini
Head of performance	(United States) Christi Edson

== Transfers and loans ==
=== Transfers in ===
Date	Player	Pos.	Previous club	Fee/notes	Ref.
December 2, 2025	(United States) Hailie Mace	DF	(United States) Kansas City Current	Free agent	
January 8, 2026	(United States) Hannah Anderson	DF	(United States) Chicago Stars FC	$70,000 Interleague transfer funds	
January 16, 2026	(United States) Seven Castain	FW	(United States) TCU	Free agent	
January 16, 2026	(United States) Cara Martin	GK	(United States) Georgetown	Free agent	
January 16, 2026	(Nigeria) Nicole Payne	DF	(United States) Portland Thorns FC	Free agent	
January 19, 2026	(Jamaica) Solai Washington	FW	(United States) Florida State	Free agent	
March 5, 2026	(United States) Reagan Raabe	FW	(United States) Nebraska Cornhuskers	Short Term Agreement	
July 16, 2026	(United States) Zoe Matthews	MF	(United States) Houston Dash	Signed through the end of the 2026 NWSL season	
August 4, 2026	(Brazil) Gabi Nunes	FW	(England) Aston Villa	Signed through the end of the 2026 NWSL season	
August 12, 2026	(Norway) Sanne Lekven	FW	(Sweden) Aalesunds FK	Signed through the end of the 2028 NWSL season	

=== Transfers out ===
Date	Player	Pos.	Destination club	Fee/notes	Ref.
December 1, 2025	(Canada) Amanda Allen	FW	(United States) Boston Legacy FC	Out of contract	
December 1, 2025	(United States) Elyse Bennett	FW	(Canada) Montreal Roses FC	Out of contract	
December 1, 2025	(United States) Simone Charley	FW	(England) Newcastle United	Out of contract	
December 1, 2025	(United States) Morgan Gautrat	MF	(England) Newcastle United	Out of contract	
December 1, 2025	(Argentina) Mariana Larroquette	FW	(Brazil) Santos	Out of contract	
December 1, 2025	(United States) Aryssa Mahrt	DF	(Portugal) Racing Power	Out of contract	
December 1, 2025	(United States) Brianna Martínez	DF	(United States) Carolina Ascent FC	Out of contract	
December 1, 2025	(United States) Carson Pickett	DF	(United States) Denver Summit FC	Out of contract	
December 1, 2025	(United States) Ally Watt	FW	(United States) Denver Summit FC	Out of contract	
January 8, 2026	(Zambia) Grace Chanda	MF	(Mexico) Querétaro	Mutual agreement	
January 9, 2026	(United States) Emily Sams	DF	(United States) Angel City FC	$650,000 Interleague transfer funds	
June 30, 2026	(United States) Reagan Raabe	FW	(United States) Tampa Bay Sun FC	Short Term Agreement Ended	

=== Loans out ===
Date	Player	Pos.	Loaned to	Start	End	Ref.
January 30, 2026	(United States) McKinley Crone	GK	(United States) Fort Lauderdale United FC	January 30, 2026	June 30, 2026	
July 1, 2026	(United States) Kat Asman	GK	(United States) Denver Summit FC	July 1, 2026	End of 2026 NWSL Season	
September 3, 2026	(England) Anna Moorhouse	GK	(England) Manchester City	September 3, 2026	January 30, 2027	

=== New contracts ===
Date	Player	Pos.	Through	Notes	Ref.
July 22, 2026	(United States) Seven Castain	FW	2028 NWSL season		
August 27, 2026	(United States) Cara Martin	GK	2028 NWSL season		
September 14, 2026	(Zambia) Barbara Banda	FW	2029 NWSL season		

== Non-competitive fixtures ==
=== Preseason ===
Win	SOW	SOL	Loss

Date	Opponent	Venue	Location	Result (Note: Orlando Pride's score written first)	Scorers
February 13	Washington Spirit	IMG Academy	Bradenton, Florida		
February 20	Racing Louisville	IMG Academy	Bradenton, Florida		
February 22	Florida	IMG Academy	Bradenton, Florida		
March 1	Gotham FC	IMG Academy	Bradenton, Florida		
March 7	Fort Lauderdale United FC	Beyond Bancard Field	Davie, Florida		

== Match results ==
=== National Women's Soccer League ===
The NWSL regular season will be played on a balanced schedule i.e. each team will play every other team twice; once at home and once away. The top eight teams will qualify for the playoffs.

==== Results summary ====
Overall								Home						Away					
Pld	W	D	L	GF	GA	GD	Pts	W	D	L	GF	GA	GD	W	D	L	GF	GA	GD
29	11	3	15	39	46	−7	36	6	1	8	22	24	−2	5	2	7	17	22	−5

Last updated: October 25, 2026.
Source: NWSLsoccer.com

==== Results by round ====
Round	1	2	3	4	5	6	7	8	9	10	11	12	13	14	15	16	17	18	19	20	21	22	23	24	25	26	27	28	29	30
Stadium	H	H	A	A	H	A	H	H	A	A	A	H	A	H	H	A	H	A	H	A	A	H	H	A	H	A	H	A	H	A
Result	L	D	W	D	W	L	L	W	L	L	W	W	L	W	L	L	W	L	L	L	W	L	W	D	L	W	L	W	L	
Position (Note: ORL's position at the end of the matchweek, not their match.)	9	12	6	7	6	6	12	8	8	9	8	6	8	8	8	9	7	10	11	12	12	12	11	11	11	11	11	11	11	

Updated to match(es) played on October 25, 2026. Source: NWSLsoccer.com
A = Away; H = Home; W = Win; D = Draw; L = Loss

==== Matches ====
Win	Draw	Loss

Matchday	Date	Opponent	Venue	Location	Result (Note: Orlando Pride's score written first)	Scorers	Attendance	Referee	Position
1	March 15	Seattle Reign FC	Inter&Co Stadium	Orlando, Florida	1–2	Banda 51'	16,320	Alexandra Billeter	9th
2	March 20	Denver Summit FC	Inter&Co Stadium	Orlando, Florida	1–1	Banda 61'	7,076	Greg Dopka	12th
3	March 25	Chicago Stars FC	Martin Stadium	Evanston, Illinois	3–0	Banda 13'; Ovalle 22'; Anderson 35'	1,821	Matthew Thompson	6th
4	March 29	Gotham FC	Sports Illustrated Stadium	Harrison, New Jersey	0–0		6,009	Nabil Bensalah	7th
5	April 3	Angel City FC	Inter&Co Stadium	Orlando, Florida	2–1	McCutcheon 84', 90+8'	8,040	Jeremy Scheer	6th
6	April 24	Racing Louisville	Lynn Family Stadium	Louisville, Kentucky	2–3	Banda 45+6', 90+3'	4,928	Alyssa Pennington	6th
7	May 2	Washington Spirit	Inter&Co Stadium	Orlando, Florida	2–4	Banda 33', 39'	7,507	Shawn Tehini	12th
8	May 8	North Carolina Courage	Inter&Co Stadium	Orlando, Florida	1–0	Banda 87'	7,088	Lauren Aldrich	8th
9	May 12	Boston Legacy FC	Gillette Stadium	Foxborough, Massachusetts	1–2	Marta 14' (pen.)	8,182	Ekaterina Koroleva	8th
10	May 16	Denver Summit FC	Dick's Sporting Goods Park	Commerce City, Colorado	1–3	Banda 76'	16,974	Cristian Campo	9th
11	May 24	San Diego Wave FC	Snapdragon Stadium	San Diego, California	1–0	Payne 45+3'	12,149	Calin Radosav	8th
12	May 29	Bay FC	Inter&Co Stadium	Orlando, Florida	3–1	Banda 4', 51'; Dyke 55'	8,140	Jaclyn Metz	6th
13	July 3	Angel City FC	BMO Stadium	Los Angeles, California	0–2		13,900	Mark Verso	8th
14	July 10	Kansas City Current	Inter&Co Stadium	Orlando, Florida	3–0	Marta 49'; Anderson 57'; Banda 85'	8,058	Nabil Bensalah	8th
15	July 15	Boston Legacy FC	Inter&Co Stadium	Orlando, Florida	0–1		6,004	Christian Campo Hernandez	8th
16	July 18	Utah Royals FC	America First Field	Sandy, Utah	0–1		9,591	Servando Berna	9th
17	July 24	Chicago Stars FC	Inter.co Stadium	Orlando, Florida	1–0	Doyle 88'	6,657	John Griggs	7th
18	July 31	North Carolina Courage	WakeMed Soccer Park	Cary, North Carolina	5–0		7,232	Trevor Wiseman	10th
19	August 7	Racing Louisville FC	Inter.co Stadium	Orlando, Florida	1–3	Abello 90+4'	6,214	Muhammad Hassan	11th
20	August 15	Portland Thorns FC	Providence Park	Portland, Oregon	1–2	Ovalle 63'	19,106	Brad Jensen	12th
21	August 23	Washington Spirit	Audi Field	Washington, D.C.		McCutcheon 3'	16,417	Matthew Corrigan	12th
22	August 29	Utah Royals FC	Inter.co Stadium	Orlando, Florida	1–2	Banda 44'	7,660	Matthew Thompson	12th
23	September 6	Houston Dash	Inter.co Stadium	Orlando, Florida	3–1	Klenke 14' (o.g.); Banda 44' (pen.); McCutcheon 64'	7,156	Rodrigo Albuquerque	11th
24	September 11	Kansas City Current	CPKC Stadium	Kansas City, Missouri	2–2	Banda 43', 50'	11,500	Gerald Flores	11th
25	September 19	Portland Thorns FC	Inter.co Stadium	Orlando, Florida	1–4	Lemos 30'	7,602	Elvis Osmanovic	11th
26	September 27	Bay FC	PayPal Park	San Jose, California	3–1	McCutcheon 2', 47'; Ovalle 90+6'	11,393	Corbyn May	11th
27	October 2	San Diego Wave FC	Inter.co Stadium	Orlando, Florida	1–2	Banda 52' (p)	8,672	Alexandra Billeter	11th
28	October 18	Houston Dash	Shell Energy Stadium	Houston, Texas	2–1	Luana 16' (p), Washington 31'	7,248	Shawn Tehini	11th
29	October 25	Gotham FC	Inter.co Stadium	Orlando, Florida	1–2	Washington 65'	11,544	Jaclyn Metz	11th
30	November 1	Seattle Reign FC	Lumen Field	Seattle, Washington	0–1		16,095	Calin Radosav	11th

== Squad statistics ==
=== Appearances ===
As of match played on September 6, 2026

Starting appearances are listed first, followed by substitute appearances after the + symbol where applicable.

No.	Pos	Nat	Player	Total		NWSL	
No.	Pos	Nat	Player	Apps	Goals	Apps	Goals
Goalkeepers
31	GK	(United States) USA	Cara Martin	0	0	0	0
77	GK	(United States) USA	Cosette Morché	7	0	7	0
Defenders
3	DF	(United States) USA	Kylie Nadaner	0	0	0	0
4	DF	(Brazil) BRA	Rafaelle Souza	19	0	15+4	0
5	DF	(United States) USA	Hailie Mace	25	0	22+3	0
12	DF	(United States) USA	Cori Dyke	27	1	27	1
16	DF	(Canada) CAN	Zara Chavoshi	13	0	8+5	0
21	DF	(Spain) ESP	Oihane Hernández	23	0	22+1	0
23	DF	(Nigeria) NGR	Nicole Payne	11	1	4+7	1
25	DF	(United States) USA	Kerry Abello	11	1	4+7	1
33	DF	(United States) USA	Zoe Matthews	4	0	0+4	0
41	DF	(United States) USA	Hannah Anderson	18	2	11+7	2
Midfielders
2	MF	(United States) USA	Haley McCutcheon	26	6	26	6
6	MF	(United States) USA	Ally Lemos	26	2	23+3	2
7	MF	(Brazil) BRA	Angelina	24	0	19+5	0
8	MF	(Brazil) BRA	Luana	39	0	8+31	0
14	MF	(United States) USA	Viviana Villacorta	0	0	0	0
Forwards
10	FW	(Brazil) BRA	Marta	16	2	7+9	2
11	FW	(Zambia) ZAM	Barbra Banda	23	17	20+3	17
13	FW	(Mexico) MEX	Jacqueline Ovalle	21	3	16+5	3
18	FW	(Brazil) BRA	Gabi Nunes	2	0	0+2	0
20	FW	(United States) USA	Julie Doyle	22	1	7+15	1
22	FW	(Norway) NOR	Sanne Lekven	2	0	0+2	0
28	FW	(United States) USA	Summer Yates	20	0	11+9	0
29	FW	(Jamaica) JAM	Solai Washington	21	0	14+7	0
30	FW	(United States) USA	Seven Castain	11	0	4+7	0
38	FW	(United States) USA	Reagan Raabe	2	0	0+2	0
80	FW	(United States) USA	Simone Jackson	9	0	2+7	0
Players away from the club on loan:
1	GK	(England) ENG	Anna Moorhouse	20	0	20	0
36	GK	(United States) USA	Kat Asman	0	0	0	0
40	GK	(United States) USA	McKinley Crone	0	0	0	0
Players transferred after mid-season:
38	FW	(United States) USA	Reagan Raabe	1	0	1	0
