= 2025 Norwegian Women's Cup =

Tournament details
- Country: Norway
- Dates: 4 April - 23 November
- Teams: 54

Final positions
- Champions: Vålerenga
- Runners-up: Rosenborg

Tournament statistics
- Matches played: 53
- Goals scored: 208 (3.92 per match)

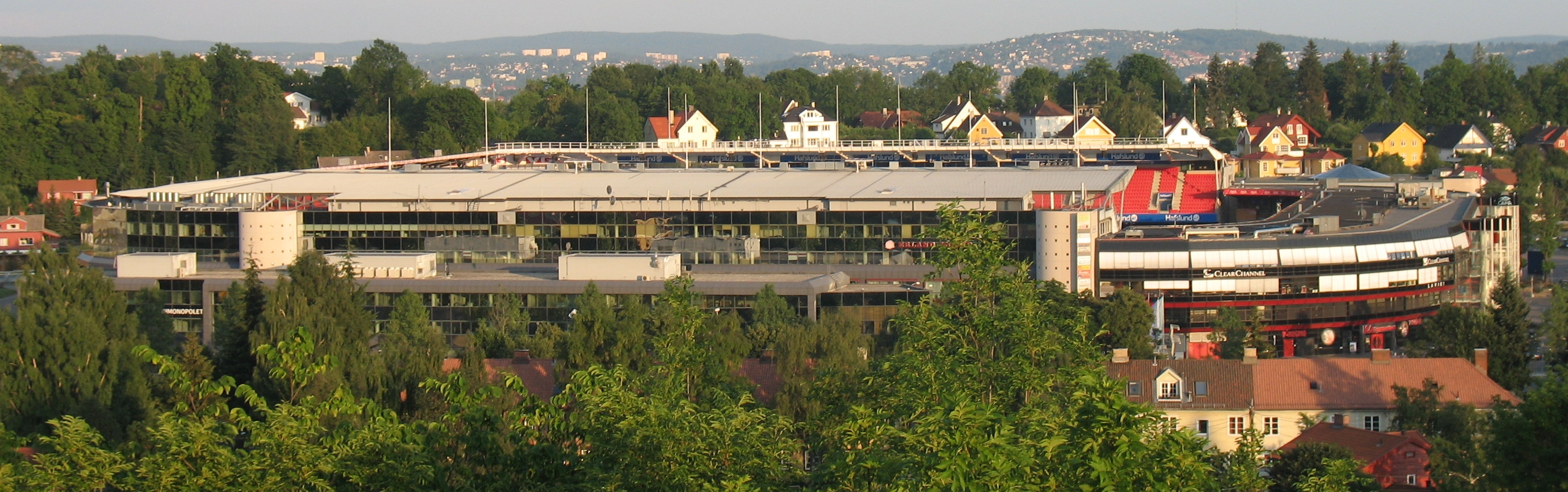
Ullevaal Stadion, Oslo - venue for the Norwegian Women's Cup final

The 2025 Norwegian Women's Cup was the 48th season of the Norwegian annual knock-out football tournament for women. It started on 4 April 2025, and the final was played on 23 November 2025.

== Calendar ==
Below are the dates for each round as given by the official schedule:

Round	Main date	Number of fixtures	Clubs
First round	30 April 2025	22	54 → 32
Second round	7 May 2025	16	32 → 16
Third round	20 May 2025	8	16 → 8
Quarter-finals	11 June 2025	4	8 → 4
Semi-finals	28 September 2025	2	4 → 2
Final	23 November 2025	1	2 → 1

== First round ==
The pair-ups for the first round were announced on 13 March 2025.

Number of teams per tier entering this round
Toppserien (1)	1. divisjon (2)	2. divisjon (3)	3. divisjon (4)	Total
10 / 10	12 / 12	18 / 18	14 / 14	54 / 54

4 April 2025	Amazon Grimstad (3)	0–1	(2) Viking	Grimstad
18:00 CEST (UTC+2)		Report	Ims 58'	Stadium: Levermyr Stadion; Referee: Elida Metveit Beisland

5 April 2025	Sogndal (3)	1–3	(2) Fyllingsdalen	Sogndalsfjøra
18:45 CEST (UTC+2)	Pettersen 61'	Report	Haugland 17'; Vestbøstad 43'; Rasmussen 88'	Stadium: Fosshaugane Campus; Attendance: 80; Referee: Adrian Banasiak

6 April 2025	Rana (4)	0–3	(3) Steinkjer	Mo i Rana
16:00 CEST (UTC+2)		Report	Grøndal 5', 60'; Holmvik 49'	Stadium: Sagbakken; Attendance: 223; Referee: Edvard Antonius Myhre Kaspersen

29 April 2025	Tynset (3)	1–2 (a.e.t.)	(2) HamKam	Tynset
18:00 CEST (UTC+2)	Nystuen 77'	Report	Heggelund 30'; Sjøli 95'	Stadium: Nytrømoen; Referee: Madelen Erika Rønvik

30 April 2025	Klepp (3)	1–0	(2) Haugesund	Kleppe
16:00 CEST (UTC+2)	Haagenrud 84'	Report		Stadium: Klepp Stadion; Referee: Mathea Havig

30 April 2025	Lillestrøm (3)	3–4	(2) Odd	Lillestrøm
18:00 CEST (UTC+2)	Andersen 4'; Bjørndalen 34' (pen.); Rimbault 65'	Report	Wallestad 15'; Aas 17'; Stoltenberg 21'; Mjelde 68'	Stadium: LSK-Hallen; Attendance: 40; Referee: Mikail Celik

30 April 2025	Grei (3)	2–1 (a.e.t.)	(3) Øvrevoll Hosle	Oslo
18:00 CEST (UTC+2)	Tsikalaki 90'; Kvandal 119'	Report	Albretsen 88'	Stadium: Grei Kunstgress; Referee: Cornelia Benneche

30 April 2025	Strømsgodset (4)	5–1	(3) Frigg	Drammen
18:00 CEST (UTC+2)	Røgeberg 13', 74', 80'; Raaen 53', 61'	Report		Stadium: Marienlyst; Referee: Yavuzhan Yel

30 April 2025	Pors (4)	4–3	(2) Start	Porsgrunn
18:00 CEST (UTC+2)	Bentsen 4', 56', 78', 90'	Report	Henriksen 40'; Fedeler 49'; Andresen 65'	Stadium: Pors Stadion; Referee: Regina Sønderland Saga

30 April 2025	Arendal (4)	0–3	(3) Sandefjord	Arendal
18:00 CEST (UTC+2)		Report	Nilsen 26', 63'; Røthe 33'	Stadium: Norac Stadion; Attendance: 160; Referee: Donya Kuhi

30 April 2025	Sola (4)	0–3 (w/o)	(3) Bryne
18:00 CEST (UTC+2)		Report

30 April 2025	Fana (3)	1–3	(2) Arna-Bjørnar	Bergen
18:00 CEST (UTC+2)	Østrem 70'	Report	Fedøy 17'; Stenersen 63'; Lekven 89'	Stadium: Nesttun Kunstgress; Attendance: 196; Referee: Shahad Emad Al-Rantisi

30 April 2025	Lyngbø (4)	5–3	(2) Åsane	Bergen
18:00 CEST (UTC+2)	Aak 18', 37'; Johannesen 30', 33'; Rake 54'	Report	Haaland 5', 9', 62'	Stadium: Lyngbø Idrettspark; Attendance: 64; Referee: Victoria Sipian Slemmen Lervik

30 April 2025	Herd (4)	0–8	(2) AaFK Fortuna	Ålesund
18:00 CEST (UTC+2)		Report	Gudnadottir 11'; Skretting 36'; Muri 41'; Sunde 45'; Nødland 62'; Pedersen 70'; Solskjær 75', 79'	Stadium: AMFI Moa Stadion; Attendance: 40; Referee: Eline Constanse Flem

30 April 2025	Kristiansund (4)	1–2	(2) Molde	Kristiansund
18:00 CEST (UTC+2)	Bugge 58'	Report	Saugen 67'; Bersås 83'	Stadium: Nordmøre Stadion; Attendance: 100; Referee: Eirik Hyldbakk Furu

30 April 2025	Ranheim (4)	4–2 (a.e.t.)	(3) Tiller	Trondheim
18:00 CEST (UTC+2)	Saleem 27'; Johansen 50'; Clausen 108'; Kulvik 118'	Report	Bang 14'; Aune 86'	Stadium: EXTRA Arena; Referee: Tilde Hunsbedt

30 April 2025	Mjølner (4)	0–3 (w/o)	(2) KIL/Hemne
18:00 CEST (UTC+2)		Report

30 April 2025	Krokelvdalen (4)	0–5	(3) Medkila	Tromsø
18:00 CEST (UTC+2)		Report	Klæboe-Solemdal 33', 40', 44'; Håkansson 66'; Ritzen 87'	Stadium: Skarpmarka Kunstgress; Attendance: 55; Referee: Peder Gausdal

30 April 2025	Alta (4)	3–0 (w/o)	(4) Porsanger
18:00 CEST (UTC+2)		Report

30 April 2025	Bjørnevatn (3)	0–3 (w/o)	(2) Tromsø
18:00 CEST (UTC+2)		Report

30 April 2025	Sarpsborg (3)	4–0	(3) KFUM	Sarpsborg
19:30 CEST (UTC+2)	Arnesen 15'; Larsen 21'; Kuqi 68'; Foss 89'	Report		Stadium: Sarpsborg Stadion; Referee: Marit Hamel

30 April 2025	Raufoss (4)	9–0	(3) Kongsvinger	Raufoss
19:30 CEST (UTC+2)	Smerud 7', 59' (pen.); Pettersen 16', 41'; Berntsen 17'; Flatmo 68', 81'; Hoem 79'	Report		Stadium: Nammo Stadion; Referee: Kristoffer Østvold Bekk

== Second round ==
The pair-ups for the second round were announced on 2 May 2025.

Number of teams per tier entering this round
Toppserien (1)	1. divisjon (2)	2. divisjon (3)	3. divisjon (4)	Total
10 / 10	9 / 12	7 / 18	6 / 14	32 / 54

6 May 2025	Strømsgodset (4)	1–6	(1) Hønefoss	Drammen
19:00 CEST (UTC+2)	Røgeberg 3'	Report	Gumaer 14', 77', 86'; Hamborg 24'; Dunsby 49'; Sandland 83'	Stadium: Marienlyst Stadion; Referee: Yavuzhan Yel

7 May 2025	HamKam (2)	0–3	(1) Stabæk	Hamar
18:00 CEST (UTC+2)		Report	Natvik 12', 29'; Høgevold 68'	Stadium: Briskeby Stadion; Attendance: 139; Referee: Christoffer Dalby Bergstuen

7 May 2025	Grei (3)	0-3	(1) Kolbotn	Oslo
18:00 CEST (UTC+2)		Report	Linberg 7'; Matsuhisa 13'; Haga 58'	Stadium: Grei Kunstgress; Referee: Jennifer Wie Rui

7 May 2025	Sandefjord (3)	1–7	(1) Vålerenga	Sandefjord
18:00 CEST (UTC+2)	Olafsen 73'	Report	Sesay 4'; Brekken 13'; Espås 38'; Pettersen 45', 63'; Heidarsdottir 58'; Tvedten 84'	Stadium: Jotun Arena; Attendance: 180; Referee: Lars Bratteli Jacobsen

7 May 2025	Viking (2)	0–1 (a.e.t.)	(1) Røa	Stavanger
18:00 CEST (UTC+2)		Report	Elverum 102'	Stadium: Lyse Arena; Referee: Therese Figved

7 May 2025	Arna-Bjørnar (2)	3–2	(2) Fyllingsdalen	Bergen
18:00 CEST (UTC+2)	Sælen 23'; Vedeler 31'; Nigardsøy 69'	Report	Vestbøstad 5'; Stavrum 43'	Stadium: Arna Idrettspark; Referee: Maren Hatletvedt

7 May 2025	Lyngbø (4)	0–5	(1) Brann	Bergen
18:00 CEST (UTC+2)		Report	Kruse 25'; Svendheim 29', 33'; Bogere 54'; Lyssand 75'	Stadium: Lyngbø Idrettspark; Referee: Shahad Emad Al-Rantisi

7 May 2025	Molde (2)	0–8	(2) AaFK Fortuna	Molde
18:00 CEST (UTC+2)		Report	Gashi 30'; Sunde 32', 34', 43', 80', 88'; Nødland 58'; Gudnadottir 75'	Stadium: Aker Stadion; Referee: Oliver Bjørsnos Bakke

7 May 2025	KIL/Hemne (2)	0–1	(1) Rosenborg	Kyrksæterøra
18:00 CEST (UTC+2)		Report	Ulvund 52'	Stadium: Trøndelag Sparebank Arena; Attendance: 250; Referee: Mathea Havig

7 May 2025	Medkila (3)	0–3	(1) LSK Kvinner	Harstad
18:00 CEST (UTC+2)		Report	Larsen 12' (o.g.); Wenger 37'; Kyvåg 75'	Stadium: Harstad Stadion; Attendance: 350; Referee: Simen Albrigtsen Eilertsen

7 May 2025	Tromsø (2)	3–0	(1) Bodø/Glimt	Tromsø
18:00 CEST (UTC+2)	Birkelund 27', 75'; Trøan 90'	Report		Stadium: Romssa Arena; Referee: Egil Bertheussen

7 May 2025	Raufoss (4)	1–0	(3) Sarpsborg	Raufoss
19:00 CEST (UTC+2)	Berntsen 19'	Report		Stadium: Nammo Stadion; Referee: Jonah Engh

7 May 2025	Alta (4)	0–8	(1) Lyn	Alta
21:00 CEST (UTC+2)		Report	Pettersen 3', 54', 76'; Olsen 14' (pen.); Galteland 25'; Prestegaard 44'; Melgård 49'; Birkelund 82'	Stadium: Finnmarkshallen; Referee: Magnus Henriksen Tjelle

8 May 2025	Pors (4)	0–1	(2) Odd	Porsgrunn
18:00 CEST (UTC+2)		Report	Aas 66'	Stadium: Pors Stadion; Referee: Pavel Breivik

8 May 2025	Ranheim (4)	2–1 (a.e.t.)	(3) Steinkjer	Trondheim
19:00 CEST (UTC+2)	Johansen 28'; Clausen 93'	Report	Sæther 61'	Stadium: EXTRA Arena; Referee: Nathalie Turøy

14 May 2025	Klepp (3)	1–3	(3) Bryne	Kleppe
18:00 CEST (UTC+2)	Berland 54'	Report	Nesse 75', 90'; Nilsen 84'	Stadium: Klepp Stadion; Attendance: 262; Referee: Tomine Espedal Strand

== Third round ==
The pair-ups for the third round were announced on 9 May 2025.

Number of teams per tier entering this round
Toppserien (1)	1. divisjon (2)	2. divisjon (3)	3. divisjon (4)	Total
9 / 10	4 / 12	1 / 18	2 / 14	16 / 54

20 May 2025	Odd (2)	0–1	(1) Røa	Skien
18:00 CEST (UTC+2)		Report	Svastuen 78'	Stadium: Skagerak Arena; Attendance: 288; Referee: Maren Hatletvedt

20 May 2025	Arna-Bjørnar (2)	2–4	(1) Brann	Bergen
18:00 CEST (UTC+2)	Årsæther 16'; Lekven 20'	Report	Eikeland 64'; Isaksen 67', 82'; Davidson 75'	Stadium: Arna Idrettspark; Attendance: 282; Referee: Karoline Marie Jensen

20 May 2025	Ranheim (4)	0–12	(1) Rosenborg	Trondheim
19:30 CEST (UTC+2)		Report	Aunehaugen 3'; Nilsen 11', 42'; Ulvund 22', 61', 70', 74'; Dahl 27', 39'; Leine 45'; Holum 71'; Brønstad 86'	Stadium: EXTRA Arena; Referee: Marit Buhaug Folstad

21 May 2025	Tromsø (2)	1–2	(1) Stabæk	Tromsø
16:00 CEST (UTC+2)	Skall 78'	Report	Omarsdottir 53', 83'	Stadium: Romssa Arena; Referee: Stine Margrete Jensen

21 May 2025	AaFK Fortuna (2)	2–3	(1) Hønefoss	Ålesund
18:00 CEST (UTC+2)	Sunde 37', 52'	Report	Nyhagen 15'; Sandland 36'; Hamborg 55'	Stadium: Color Line Stadion; Referee: Henrikke Holm Nervik

21 May 2025	Lyn (1)	0–5	(1) Vålerenga	Oslo
18:00 CEST (UTC+2)		Report	Tvedten 19'; Sævik 36', 56', 65'; Sesay 90'	Stadium: Kringsjå Kunstgress; Attendance: 290; Referee: Marit Skurdal

21 May 2025	Bryne (3)	2–0	(1) Kolbotn	Bryne
18:00 CEST (UTC+2)	Askedal 15', 26'	Report		Stadium: Aarbakkebanen; Referee: Mathea Havig

22 May 2025	Raufoss (4)	0–5	(1) LSK Kvinner	Raufoss
18:00 CEST (UTC+2)		Report	Herseth 2'; Kyvåg 31'; Bjærkseter 43'; Haahr 88'; Johansen 90'	Stadium: Nammo Stadion; Referee: Maliha Ahmady

== Quarter-finals ==
The pair-ups for the quarter-finals were announced on 22 May 2025.

Number of teams per tier entering this round
Toppserien (1)	1. divisjon (2)	2. divisjon (3)	3. divisjon (4)	Total
7 / 10	0 / 12	1 / 18	0 / 14	8 / 54

11 June 2025	Røa (1)	0–3	(1) Brann	Oslo
18:00 CEST (UTC+2)		Report	Davidson 11'; Eikeland 58'; Gaupset 90'	Stadium: Røa Kunstgress; Attendance: 278; Referee: Karoline Marie Jensen

11 June 2025	Stabæk (1)	1–2	(1) Vålerenga	Bærum
18:00 CEST (UTC+2)	Omarsdottir 24'	Report	Sævik 33'; Vickius 82'	Stadium: Nadderud Stadion; Attendance: 241; Referee: Henrikke Holm Nervik

11 June 2025	Bryne (3)	2–2 (a.e.t.) (1–2 p)	(1) Hønefoss	Bryne
18:00 CEST (UTC+2)	Øfsteng 9'; Haaland 55'	Report	Masdal 74'; Hamborg 89'	Stadium: Bryne Stadion; Attendance: 309; Referee: Maren Hatletvedt

11 June 2025	Rosenborg (1)	2–0	(1) LSK Kvinner	Trondheim
18:00 CEST (UTC+2)	Aunehaugen 23'; Sørum 72' (pen.)	Report		Stadium: Koteng Arena; Attendance: 483; Referee: Marit Skurdal

== Semi-finals ==
The pair-ups for the semi-finals were announced on 22 May 2025.

Number of teams per tier entering this round
Toppserien (1)	1. divisjon (2)	2. divisjon (3)	3. divisjon (4)	Total
4 / 10	0 / 12	0 / 18	0 / 14	4 / 54

27 September 2025	Rosenborg (1)	3–0	(1) Hønefoss	Trondheim
16:00 CEST (UTC+2)	Nilsen 77'; Sørum 89'; Holum 90'	Report		Stadium: Koteng Arena; Attendance: 582; Referee: Maren Hatletvedt

28 September 2025	Vålerenga (1)	2–1	(1) Brann	Oslo
16:00 CEST (UTC+2)	Tvedten 70'; Thorsnes 80'	Report	Zomers 47'	Stadium: Intility Arena; Attendance: 840; Referee: Karoline Marie Jensen

== Final ==
23 November 2025
16:00 CET (UTC+1)

Rosenborg	0–2	Vålerenga
	Report	Vickius 17'; Tvedten 36'

Ullevaal Stadion, Oslo
Attendance: 3,386
Referee: Stine Margrete Jensen

== Top scorers ==
As of 23 November 2025

Rank	Player	Club	Goals
1	(Norway) Katarina Dybvik Sunde	AaFK Fortuna	8
2	(Norway) Eivor Ulvund	Rosenborg	5
3	(Norway) Guro Røgeberg	Strømsgodset	4
3	(Norway) June Bentsen	Pors	4
3	(Norway) Karina Sævik	Vålerenga	4
3	(Norway) Kristin Sandstad Gumaer	Hønefoss	4
3	(Norway) Olaug Tvedten	Vålerenga	4
3	(Norway) Synne Kristine Nilssen Hamborg	Hønefoss	4
9	6 players		3
