= Dois Riachos =

Municipality of Alagoas, Brazil

- Municipality
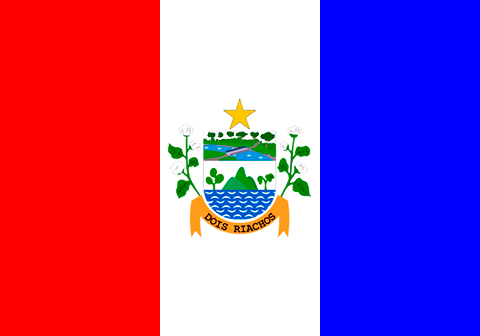
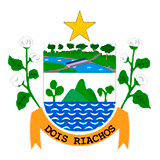
- Flag Coat of arms
- Nickname: Land of the cattle (Portuguese: Terra do Gado)
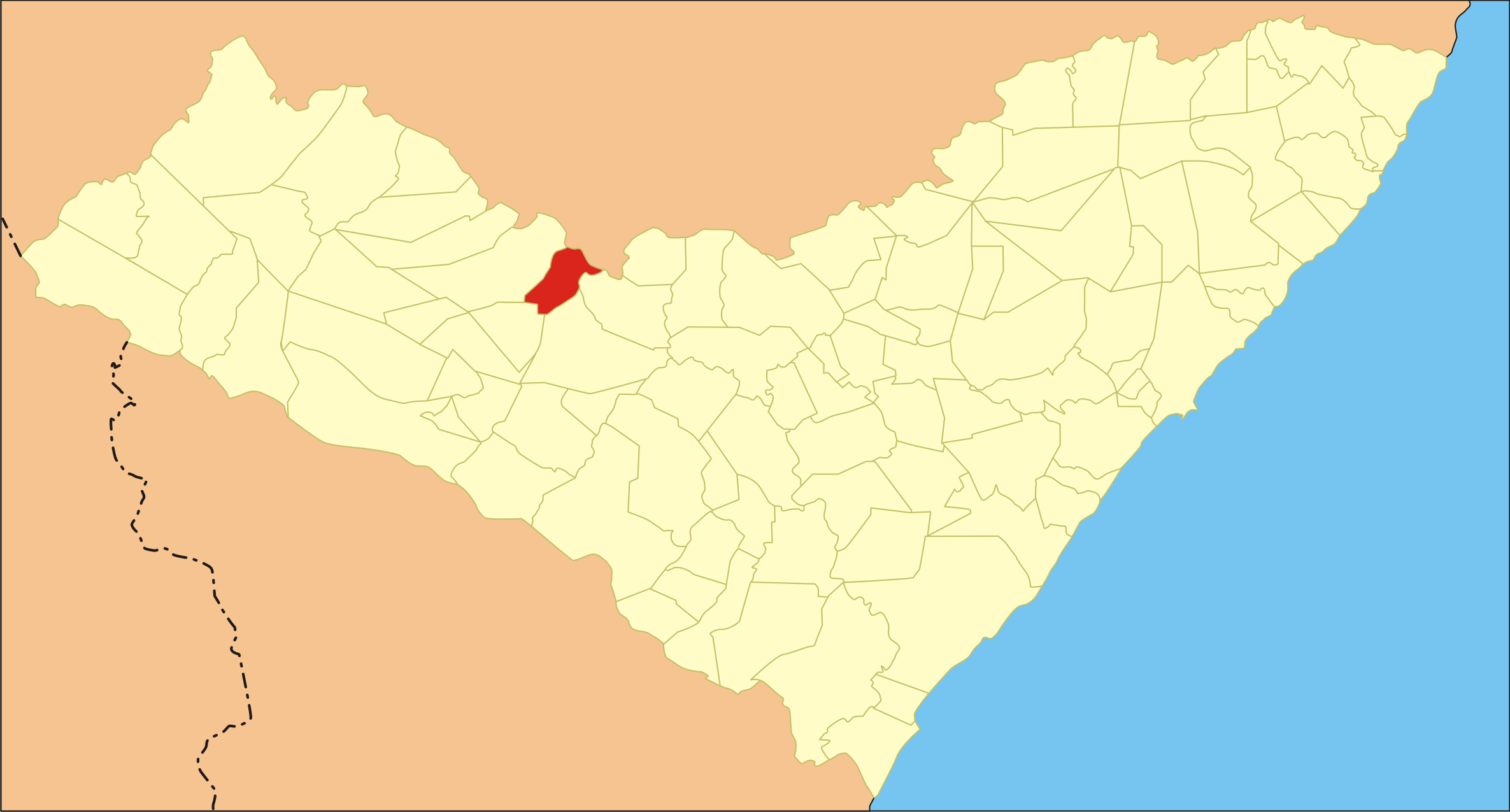
- Location in Alagoas

- Location in Brazil
- Coordinates: 09°23′34″S 37°06′03″W
- Country: Brazil
- Region: Northeast
- State: Alagoas
- Incorporated (municipality): July 8, 1960

Government
  - Mayor: Ramon Camilo

Area
  - Total: 139.850 km^{2} (53.996 sq mi)

Population (2020)
  - Total: 11,067
  - Density: 77.4/km^{2} (200/sq mi)
- Demonym: Riachense
- Time zone: UTC−3 (BRT)
- CEP postal code: 57560-000
- Area code: 82
- HDI (2010): 0,532
- Website: doisriachos.al.gov.br

Dois Riachos (Central northeastern portuguese pronunciation: [ˈdoɪ̆ɦ ɦiˈɐʃʊ]) is a municipality located in the West of the Brazilian state of Alagoas. Its population is 11,067 (2020) and its area is 140 km^{2} (54 sq mi).

Dois Riachos is the birthplace of Marta, among the most notable woman football players in the world.
