= Match Against Poverty =

- Founded: 2003
- Region: Worldwide
- Website: Match Against Poverty

The Match Against Poverty was a friendly football match that took place almost every year from 2003 until 2015 to raise funds to support specific development projects selected by the United Nations Development Programme (UNDP). The UNDP organized the game with the help of UNDP Goodwill Ambassadors Zinedine Zidane and Ronaldo, is supported by both FIFA and UEFA, and raises awareness and mobilizes public opinion for the Millennium Development Goals (MDGs) that were created in 2000.

Since 2003, 12 Matches against Poverty have raised nearly US $4 million to support UNDP's work, including that on post-earthquake reconstruction in Haiti and Pakistan, Typhoon recovery in the Philippines, post-famine relief in the Horn of Africa and anti-poverty projects in Africa, Asia, Eastern Europe and Latin America.

== History ==
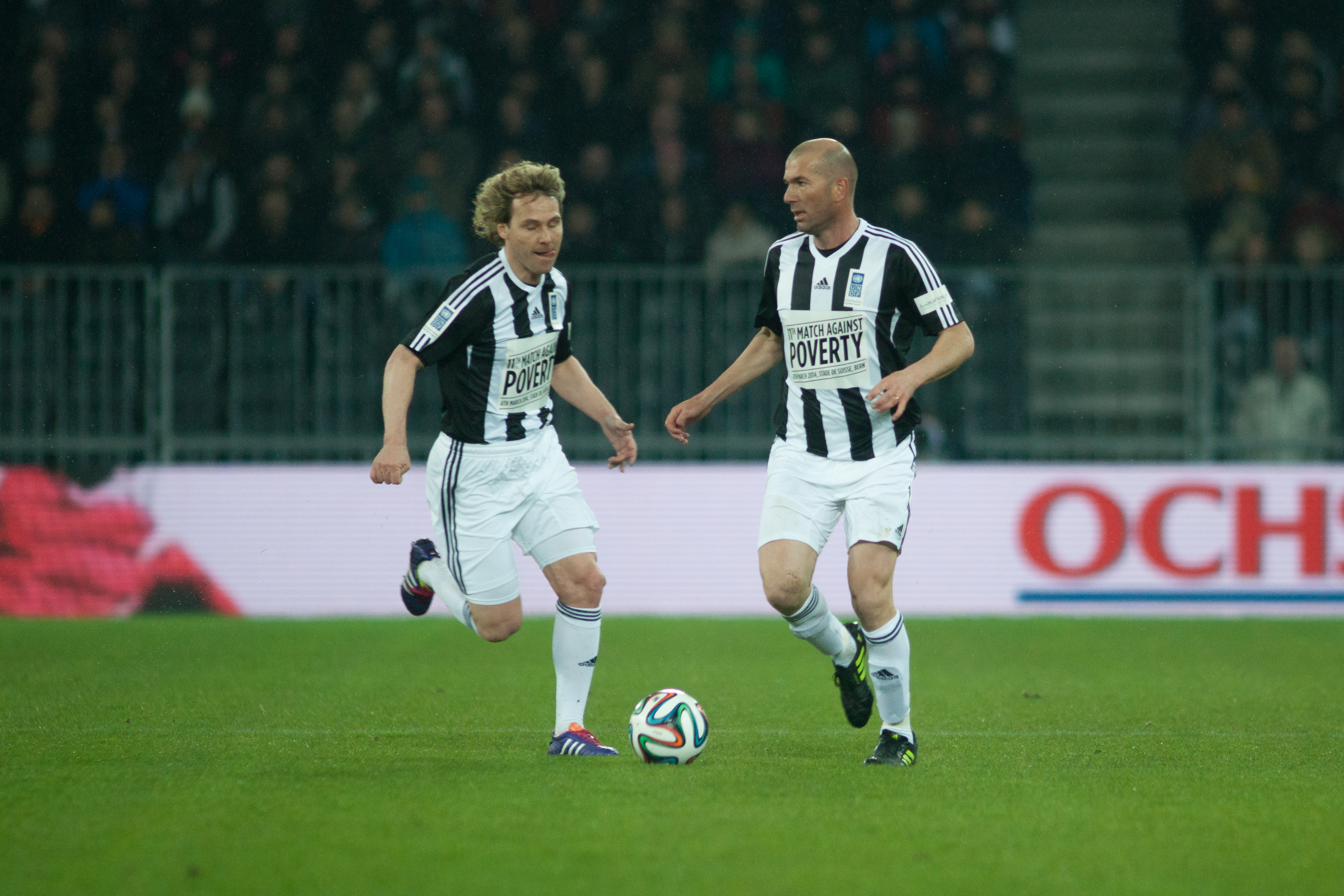
Zinedine Zidane (right) and Pavel Nedvěd playing in the eleventh match in March 2014

Adopted in 2000 and reaffirmed by the leaders of 191 countries at the UN Summit in 2005, the Millennium Development Goals seek to halve world poverty by 2015 by setting targets for rolling back hunger, disease, illiteracy, environmental degradation and discrimination against women. Thus the Match Against Poverty was created in 2003 at the initiative of Zidane and Ronaldo. At the launch of the event, Ronaldo said, "We use this match as a way to raise funds and to make people aware of the fact that the solution to this problem is in our hands. It is by working together that we will all win the Match against Poverty." The first match included the likes of David Beckham, Edwin van der Sar, Samuel Eto'o, Roberto Carlos, Robinho and Rivaldo, with "Ronaldo & Friends" defeating "Zidane & Friends" 4−3 in front of 30,000 people at St. Jakob-Park. The match raised more than $800,000 for anti-poverty projects in developing countries.

In 2008, Ronaldo and Zidane invited Marta to play in UNDP’s Match Against Poverty in Fez, Morocco, where she became the first woman in the history of football to play in an internationally sanctioned men’s football match.

On 19 November 2008, Zidane and Ronaldo took part in the fifth annual Match Against Poverty in Málaga, Spain, which ended in a 2–2 draw. The ambassadors, who collaborated in conceiving the yearly event to benefit the United Nations Development Programme, regularly captain their respective teams consisting of active footballers, other professional athletes and celebrities. Zidane, a UN Goodwill Ambassador since 2001, stated his reason for being part of the event was because "everyone can do something to make the world a better place."

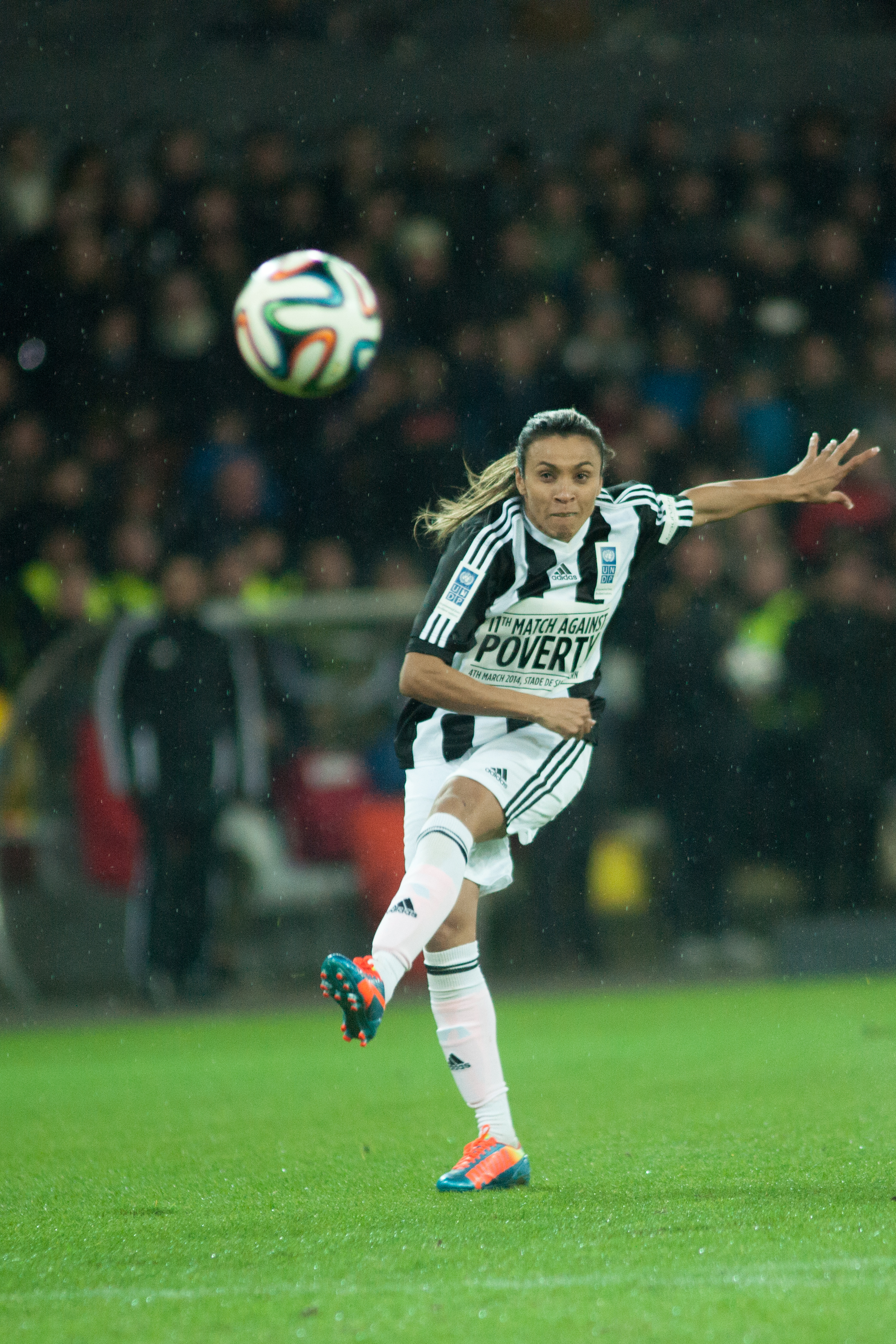
Marta, a five-time FIFA World Player of the Year winner, played in the 2014 match.

The tenth Match Against Poverty was held in Porto Alegre in 2012. It followed nine successful editions that took place in Basel, Madrid, Düsseldorf, Marseille, Málaga, Fez, Lisbon, Athens and Hamburg. Each year funds raised support specific projects in different countries facing difficult challenges. Proceeds from the tenth Match in Brazil were split between two projects – one in Brazil and one in Cape Verde, West Africa, both aimed at re-integrating marginalized youth. In Brazil, proceeds funded the “Rede Esporte para Mudança Social (REMS)” a project that promotes poverty reduction and social inclusion through sports. The match was played in front of more than 50,000 fans at the Arena do Grêmio on 18 December 2012 and raised $360,000 for the two youth-oriented projects.

In 2013, Global Ambassador and football goalkeeper Iker Casillas helped launch a national website on volunteerism and social innovation in Uzbekistan through the UNDP and Match Against Poverty platform to encourage Uzbek youth to volunteer and become active in sport.

The eleventh match was held on 4 March 2014 at the Stade de Suisse in Bern, Switzerland, with the proceeds going to recovery efforts in the Philippines in the wake of Typhoon Haiyan, one of the most devastating storms in history. Participants of the eleventh match included Robert Pires, Claude Makélélé, Paolo Maldini, Freddie Ljungberg, Luís Figo, Pavel Nedvěd, Marta and Ruud Gullit. The match was played against BSC Young Boys, who donated some of the $190,000 profits to the club’s partner charity, the Laureus Foundation Switzerland to support sports-related projects. The eleventh Match Against Poverty also received a donation of $24,000 from Sony through their annual fundraising initiative "the 46th Aino Izumi" at the Sony Building in Ginza, Tokyo, Japan.

The 12th Match against Poverty took place in Saint-Etienne, France on Monday 20 April 2015, where Ronaldo and Zidane teamed up with other football stars against past and present players of French Ligue 1 side AS Saint-Étienne. According to UNDP, "two-thirds of all proceeds will go towards helping the hardest-hit countries of Guinea, Liberia and Sierra Leone build back better from the Ebola epidemic."

== Goodwill Ambassadors ==
UNDP, alongside other UN agencies, has enlisted the voluntary services and support of prominent individuals as Goodwill Ambassadors to highlight these causes. They help amplify the message of human development and international cooperation, helping to accelerate the achievement of the Millennium Development Goals. They articulate the UNDP development philosophy and programmes of self-reliant opportunities and motivate people to act in the interest of improving their own lives and those of their fellow citizens.

=== Global Ambassadors ===
- Ronaldo
- Zinedine Zidane
- Didier Drogba
- Iker Casillas
- Marta

== Matches ==
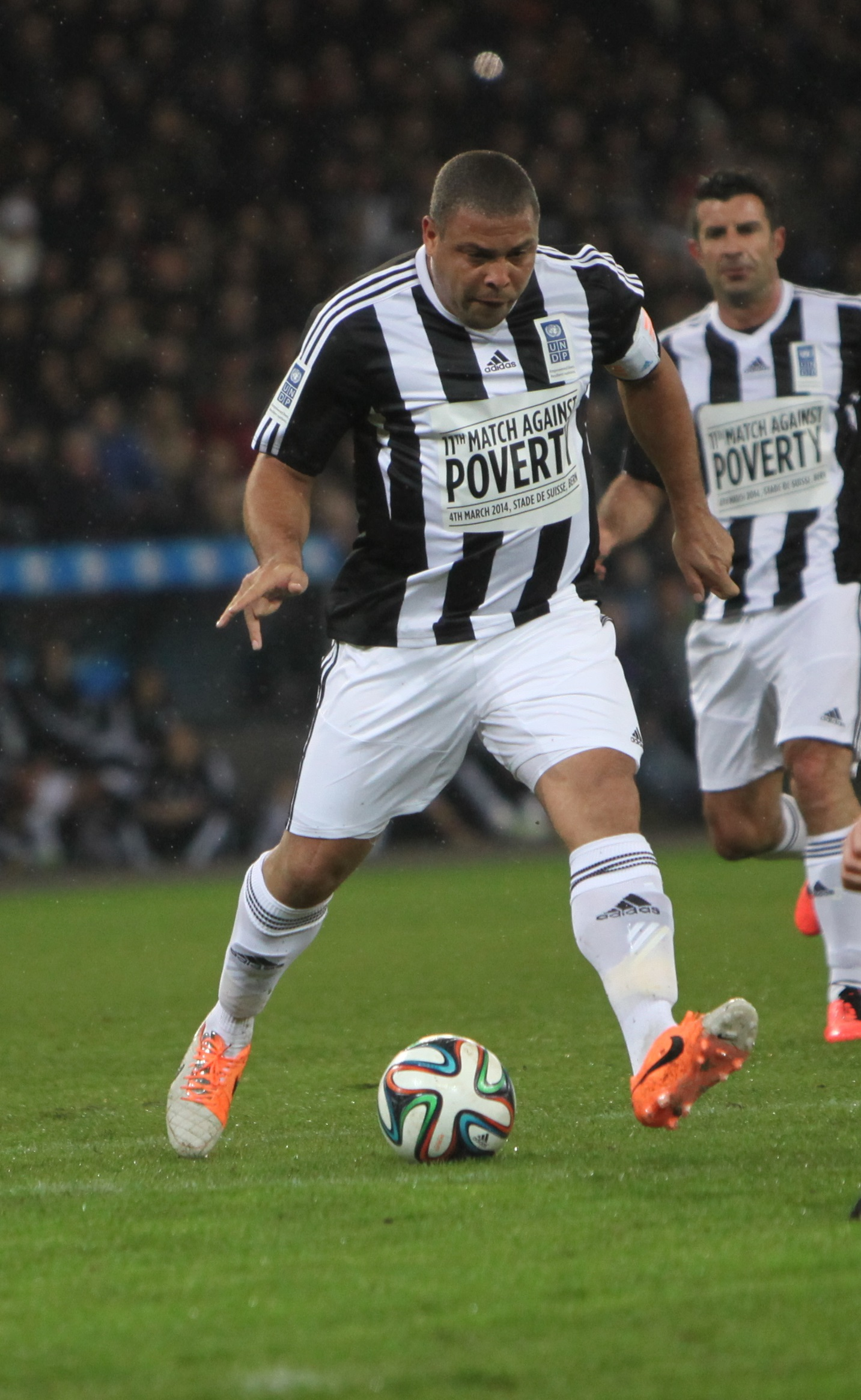
Ronaldo, who helped establish the series in 2003, and Luís Figo (background) playing in the 2014 edition.

- 2003, December 14: St. Jakob-Park, Basel, Switzerland (30,000) : Zidane & Friends vs. Ronaldo & Friends 3-4. The first match against poverty raised approximately $1 million for the UNDP.
- 2004: Madrid, Spain: The 2nd Match Against Poverty was held on 14 December 2004, at the Estadio Santiago Bernabéu, home of Real Madrid, and was attended by 65,000 fans who saw the two sides play out a 4−4 draw. $200,000 was raised for projects in Haiti.
- 2005: Düsseldorf, Germany: The 3rd Match Against Poverty was played at the Esprit Arena on 22 December 2005. The match was attended by over 48,000 fans and broadcast live in over 30 countries. Teenager Freddy Adu became the first American to play in the series, as the two sides played out a 4−2 match in favor of Zidane. $450,000 was raised for projects in Ethiopia, Maldives, Burkina Faso, Colombia, the Democratic Republic of Congo and Cuba.
- 2006: Marseille, France: Zidane and friends prevail in 2006 Match Against Poverty.
- 2007: Málaga, Spain: The 5th Match Against Poverty brought together 30,000 fans.
- 2008: Fez, Morocco: The 6th Match Against Poverty was the first to be played outside of Europe, being held at the Complexe Sportif de Fès in Morocco on 17 November 2008. $180,000 was collected to finance projects in Eastern Europe, Asia, Africa and Latin America.
- 2010: Lisbon, Portugal: The match raised more than $760,000 for earthquake victims in Haiti.
- 2010: Athens, Greece: The match between Zidane & Friends vs. Olympiacos F.C. finished 2−2, with Kostas Mitroglou scoring twice for the Greek side, and was broadcast live in more than 30 countries. The match raised more than $540,000 for recovery efforts in Haiti and for Pakistanis affected by the devastating floods in July 2010.
- 2011: Hamburg, Germany: The 9th Match against Poverty raised more than $100,000 for humanitarian and relief operations in the Horn of Africa. The match was Ronaldo, Zidane, & Friends vs. a Hamburger SV all-time team.
- 2012: Porto Alegre, Brazil: The 10th Match Against Poverty raised $360,000 to support UNDP projects in Brazil and Cape Verde. This match was Ronaldo & Friends vs Zidane & Friends.
- 2014: Bern, Switzerland: The 11th Match Against Poverty raised $190,000 for recovery efforts in the Philippines in the wake of Typhoon Haiyan. This match was either Ronaldo & Friends vs Zidane & Friends. or Ronaldo, Zidane, & Friends vs. a BSC Young Boys all-time team.
- 2015: Saint-Étienne, France: Raised money for African countries most affected by the Ebola epidemic. This match was Ronaldo, Zidane, & Friends vs. a AS St-Étienne all-time team.

== See also ==
- United Nations Development Programme
- International development
- United Nations Millennium Campaign
- United Nations Volunteers
- Development assistance
