= Marta (footballer) =

Brazilian footballer (born 1986)

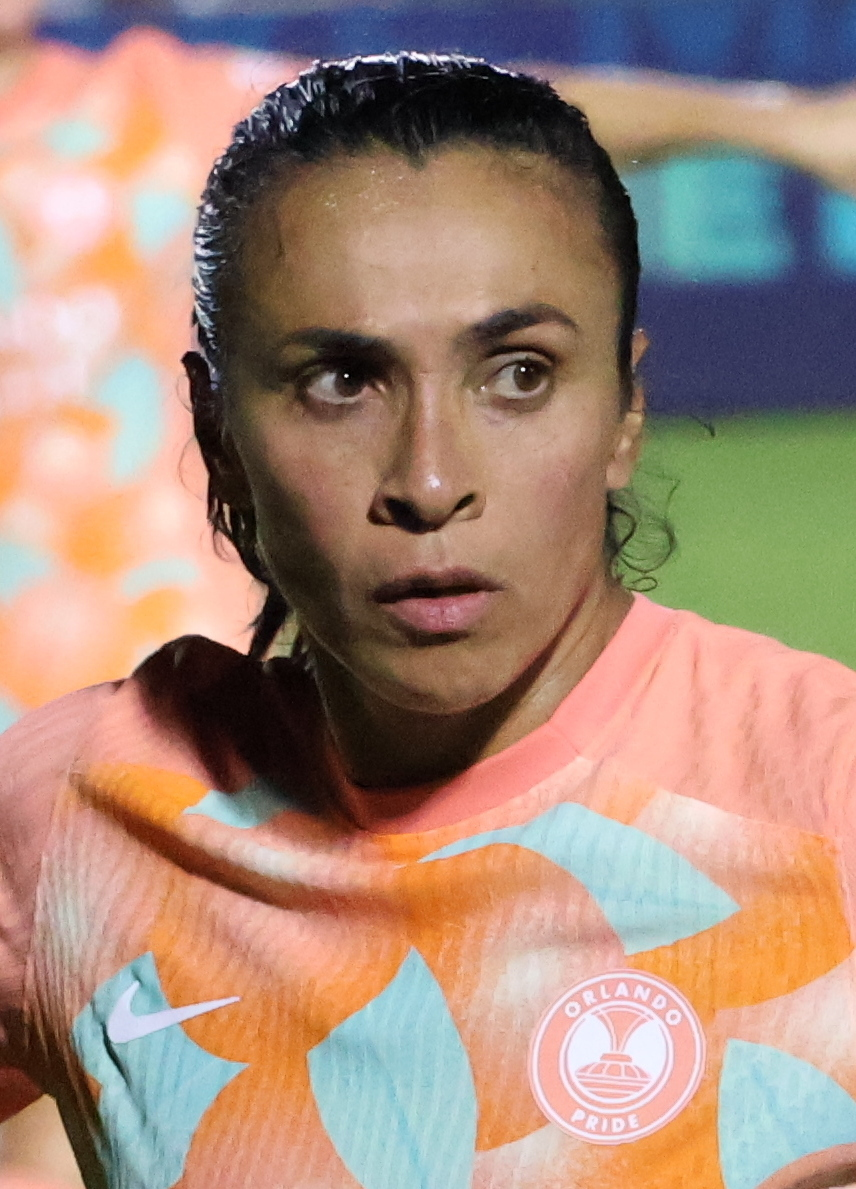
- Marta with the Orlando Pride in 2024

Personal information
- Full name: Marta Vieira da Silva
- Date of birth: 19 February 1986 (age 40)
- Place of birth: Dois Riachos, Alagoas, Brazil
- Height: 1.62 m (5 ft 4 in)
- Position: Forward

Team information
- Current team: Orlando Pride
- Number: 10

Youth career
- 1999: CSA

Senior career*
Years	Team	Apps	(Gls)
2000–2002	Vasco da Gama	16	(4)
2002–2004	Santa Cruz	38	(16)
2004–2008	Umeå IK	103	(111)
2009	Los Angeles Sol	19	(10)
2009–2010	→ Santos (loan)	14	(26)
2010	Gold Pride	24	(19)
2011	Santos	12	(13)
2011	Western New York Flash	14	(10)
2012–2014	Tyresö	38	(27)
2014–2017	Rosengård	43	(23)
2017–	Orlando Pride	155	(46)

International career^{‡}
2002	Brazil U19		
2002–	Brazil	214	(122)
Medal record
Women's football
Representing Brazil
FIFA Women's World Cup
Silver medal – second place	2007 China
Olympic Games
Silver medal – second place	2004 Athens
Silver medal – second place	2008 Beijing
Silver medal – second place	2024 Paris
Copa América Femenina
Gold medal – first place	2003 Argentina/Ecuador/Peru
Gold medal – first place	2010 Ecuador
Gold medal – first place	2018 Chile
Gold medal – first place	2025 Ecuador
Pan American Games
Gold medal – first place	2003 Santo Domingo
Gold medal – first place	2007 Rio de Janeiro
- * Club domestic league appearances and goals as of 03:26, 8 November 2026 (UTC) ‡ National team caps and goals as of 10 August 2024

Marta Vieira da Silva (Note: Portuguese pronunciation: [ˈmaʁtɐ viˈejɾɐ dɐ ˈsiwvɐ]) (born 19 February 1986), is a Brazilian professional footballer who plays as a forward for the National Women's Soccer League club Orlando Pride and captains the Brazil women's national team. Regarded by many as the greatest female footballer of all time, she has been named FIFA World Player of the Year six times.

As of 2025, Marta is Brazil's all-time top scorer with 122 goals. She holds the record for most career goals in the Women's World Cup, with 17. She was the first footballer of any gender to score at five World Cups (Note: This feat has since been matched by Christine Sinclair in 2019, Cristiano Ronaldo in 2022 and Lionel Messi in 2026.) and at five consecutive Olympic Games. She was a member of the Brazilian national teams that won the silver medal at the 2004, 2008 and 2024 Summer Olympics. She won the Golden Ball award at the 2004 FIFA U-19 Women's World Championship, and won both the Golden Ball and the Golden Boot awards at the 2007 Women's World Cup after leading Brazil to the final.

At the club level, Marta won the UEFA Women's Cup with the Swedish club Umeå IK in 2004, and won seven Swedish league championships during her time playing for various teams in the country. In 2014, she was a UEFA Women's Champions League runner-up with Tyresö FF. She won the Women's Professional Soccer championship in 2010 and 2011, and she helped the Orlando Pride win their first National Women's Soccer League championship in 2024.

Marta was an ambassador for the 2014 FIFA World Cup in Brazil. In 2013, she appeared in the Sveriges Television documentary series The Other Sport. She helped carry the Olympic flag into the Maracanã Stadium during the opening ceremony of the 2016 Summer Olympics. In 2019, she was appointed by the Secretary-General of the United Nations as a Sustainable Development Goals advocate. In Brazil she is nicknamed 'Rainha' ('Queen').

== Club career ==
=== Career start ===
Marta was discovered at the age of 14 by Brazilian coach Helena Pacheco. After playing for the Centro Sportivo Alagoano youth team, Marta started her professional career at Vasco da Gama in 2000, but the club folded two years later. She then transferred to Santa Cruz, a small club in the state of Minas Gerais, where she played for two more seasons before joining Umeå IK of Sweden.

=== 2004–2009: Umeå IK ===
Marta joined Umeå IK during the 2004 season. During her first season, the team reached the final of the UEFA Women's Cup, winning 8–0 on aggregate against Frankfurt, with Marta scoring three goals over the two legs. Domestically, Umeå finished second to Djurgården in both the Damallsvenskan and the Swedish Cup. That season, Marta scored 22 goals and was tied with her teammate Laura Kalmari for most goals in the league. Umeå were eliminated in the UEFA Women's Cup quarter-finals by Djurgården, with Marta unable to play due to injury. In the 2005 season, Marta was the top scorer in the Damallsvenskan with 21 goals, and helped Umeå to an undefeated season. During the Swedish Cup finals, Marta punched Helen Fagerström. Minutes later, Malin Nykvist elbowed Marta in the face, resulting in a fractured eye socket. Marta later apologized for her behavior.

In 2006, Umeå was again undefeated in the league, with Marta scoring 21 goals. The team achieved an 11–1 aggregate win over Kolbotn FK in the 2007 UEFA Women's Cup semi-finals, with Marta scoring twice in both matches. They went on to lose the final to Arsenal. For the third time in a row, she was on the losing side in the Swedish cup final when Umeå was defeated 3–2 by Linköpings FC. Umeå won the league in 2007. They also won the Swedish Cup after defeating AIK 4–3 in a match in which Marta scored a hat-trick. Marta scored 25 goals in the league, finishing one goal behind the top scorer Lotta Schelin.

The 2008 season saw Umeå win another league title, with Marta tying with Manon Melis for the top scorer. In January 2009, Marta announced that she would play for the Los Angeles Sol for the next three years. At her request, the Sol also signed Umeå's Johanna Frisk, which led Swedish TV4 sports presenter Patrick Ekwall to report that Marta and Frisk were a lesbian couple. Both players denied this to be true.

=== 2009: Los Angeles Sol and Santos ===
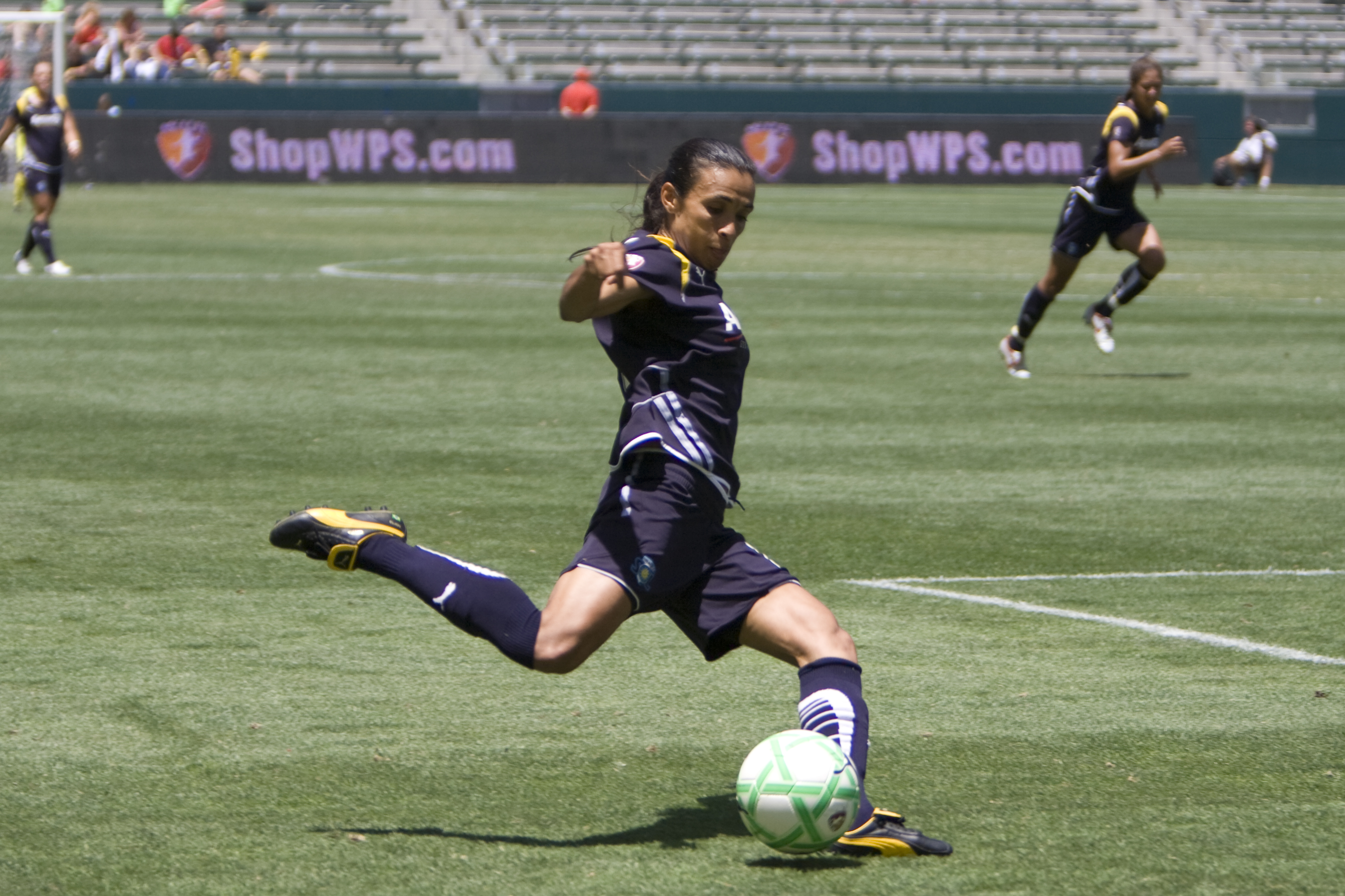
Marta in a 2009 match against Saint Louis Athletica

Marta joined the Women's Professional Soccer (WPS) team Los Angeles Sol for the league's inaugural season on a three-year contract. She said she joined the league because it was considered one of the best in the world, and would allow her to play with the top players in the world. She was the league's top scorer for the 2009 season with ten goals and three assists. She won the Player of the Week Award twice, and she won the WPS MVP. She played in the 2009 WPS All-Star Game against her former club, Umeå IK, and helped the WPS team win. The Sol were regular season champions and reached the WPS Championship Final, where they lost 1–0 to Sky Blue FC.

During the off-season, Marta signed a three-month loan contract with the Brazilian club Santos, which allowed her to play in the Copa Libertadores and the Copa do Brasil. Santos won both competitions, with Marta scoring a goal in the Libertadores final and two in the Copa do Brasil final.

=== 2010: FC Gold Pride and return to Santos ===
The Sol ceased operations in January 2010, and Marta was acquired by FC Gold Pride as their first pick in the 2010 WPS Dispersal Draft. She appeared in all of the Gold Pride's 24 games and scored 19 goals, earning her the WPS MVP and WPS Golden Boot awards for the second year in a row. She captained an international team at the 2010 WPS All-Star Game and led them to victory. She led the Gold Pride to the regular-season championship and had two assists and a goal in the WPS Championship final against the Philadelphia Independence, which earned her MVP honors. Marta became a free agent after the Gold Pride folded in November. The following month, she returned to Santos for another three-month loan. She helped the club win the Women's International Club Football Tournament held in Araraquara, Brazil.

=== 2011: Western New York Flash ===
In January 2011, Marta joined her third WPS team in three years, the expansion team Western New York Flash. She scored ten goals in 14 games during the season to earn her third consecutive WPS Golden Boot, and she was named to the 2011 WPS Best XI. She helped the Flash win the 2011 WPS Championship title in a 5–4 penalty kick shootout after a 1–1 draw in regulation time.

=== 2012–2014: Tyresö FF ===
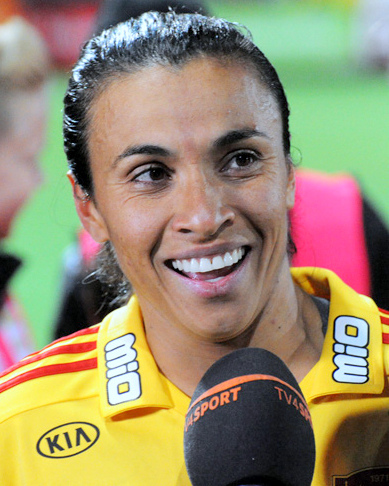
Marta in 2013

When WPS cancelled the 2012 season, Marta decided to return to the Damallsvenskan in Sweden. On 22 February 2012, she signed a two-year contract with Tyresö FF. According to the owners of the club, her salary of about $400,000 per season was paid by external sponsors and not Tyresö. In the 2012 season, Marta helped Tyresö win their first league title.

Marta scored twice in Tyresö's 4–3 loss to Wolfsburg in the 2014 UEFA Women's Champions League Final. They qualified for the 2014–15 UEFA Women's Champions League after finishing second in the 2013 Damallsvenskan, but withdrew due to financial issues. Tyresö also withdrew from the 2014 Damallsvenskan season, erasing all their results and making all their players free agents. As news of Tyresö's financial difficulties spread, Marta was linked with a possible transfer to Avaldsnes IL of the Norwegian Toppserien league, although the club's chairman warned that she would have to take a substantial pay cut. Paris Saint-Germain Féminines also reportedly approached Marta.

=== Rosengård ===
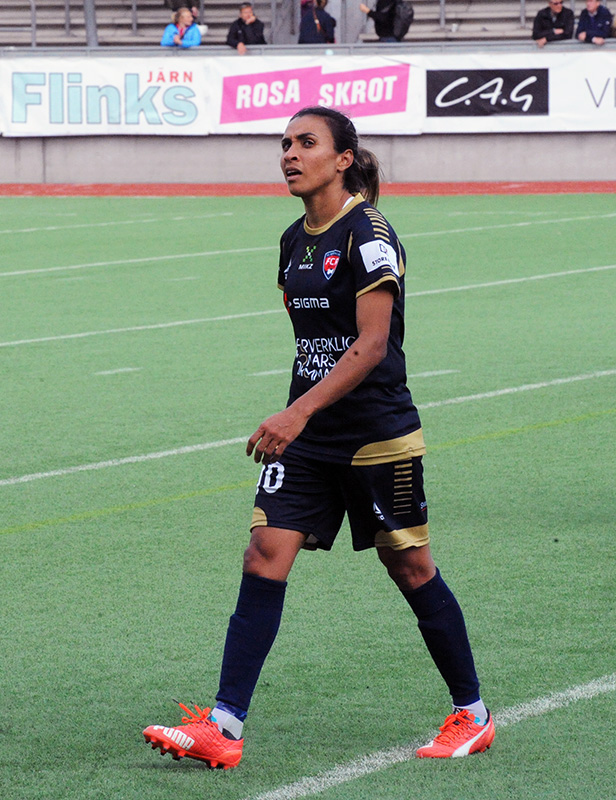
Marta playing for Rosengård in 2015

In July 2014, Marta signed a six-month contract with the Swedish club FC Rosengård, the defending champions in the Damallsvenskan league. She helped them win the league title again in 2014, and in December she signed a three-year contract to stay with the club. She scored in both matches against Wolfsburg in the 2014–15 UEFA Women's Champions League quarter-finals, but Rosengård lost on the away goals tiebreaker. Marta helped the club defend their league title in 2015, and they also won the Svenska Supercupen.

During the 2015–16 UEFA Women's Champions League, Marta scored a hat-trick in the round of 16 to help Rosengård advance, to the quarter-finals, where they lost to Frankfurt in a penalty shoot-out. She helped Rosengård win the 2016 Swedish Cup with a goal and two assists, and also served an assist in the Svenska Supercupen in a 2–1 victory over Linköping FC.

=== Orlando Pride ===
In April 2017, Marta joined Orlando Pride on a free transfer from Rosengård, which agreed to terminate her contract. Her new contract with Orlando was for two years, with the option for a third. In her first season at Orlando, she finished second in the league in both goals and assists, and she was named to the National Women's Soccer League (NWSL) Best XI. The Pride ended the season in third place, earning their first-ever playoff appearance, losing in the semi-finals to the Portland Thorns.

Marta scored four goals and had four assists during the 2018 NWSL season, winning the NWSL Goal of the Week award in week 15. She scored six goals during the 2019 NWSL season and won the NWSL Player of the Week award for week 13. After the 2019 season, Marta signed a contract to stay with the Pride. The 2020 NWSL season was canceled due to the COVID-19 pandemic in the United States, but the Pride were scheduled to compete in the 2020 NWSL Challenge Cup. However, the team had to withdraw due to multiple positive COVID-19 test results. Marta played in every minute of the four games of the 2020 NWSL Fall Series.

Marta signed a one-year contract with the option of a second year heading into the 2021 season. She had four goals and three assists in the 2021 NWSL season, where the Pride placed eighth and did not advance into the playoffs. Ahead of the 2022 season, Marta was named captain following the off-season departure of Ashlyn Harris. She suffered an ACL tear in her left knee on 26 March during the second game of the 2022 NWSL Challenge Cup and was placed on the club's season-ending injury list before surgery. On 21 December, Marta signed a two-year contract to stay with the Pride through the 2024 season.

Marta returned to play 18 games in the 2023 NWSL season and scored four goals. On 2 October 2023, she became the first player to reach 100 appearances for the Pride in a 1–0 win over Angel City FC. In the first home game of the 2024 season, Marta scored the equalizer in the 88th minute of the 1–1 draw with Angel City. In the away game against Utah Royals, she scored in the 68th minute of the 1–0 victory and claimed Orlando Pride's 200th goal. Marta won the first NWSL titles of her career with Orlando Pride in 2024, clinching both the NWSL Shield during the regular season and then the NWSL Championship with a 1–0 victory over Washington Spirit, on 23 November 2024. She was named to the 2024 NWSL Best XI.

Ahead of the 2025 season, Marta signed a new two-year contract with Orlando on 9 January.

== International career ==
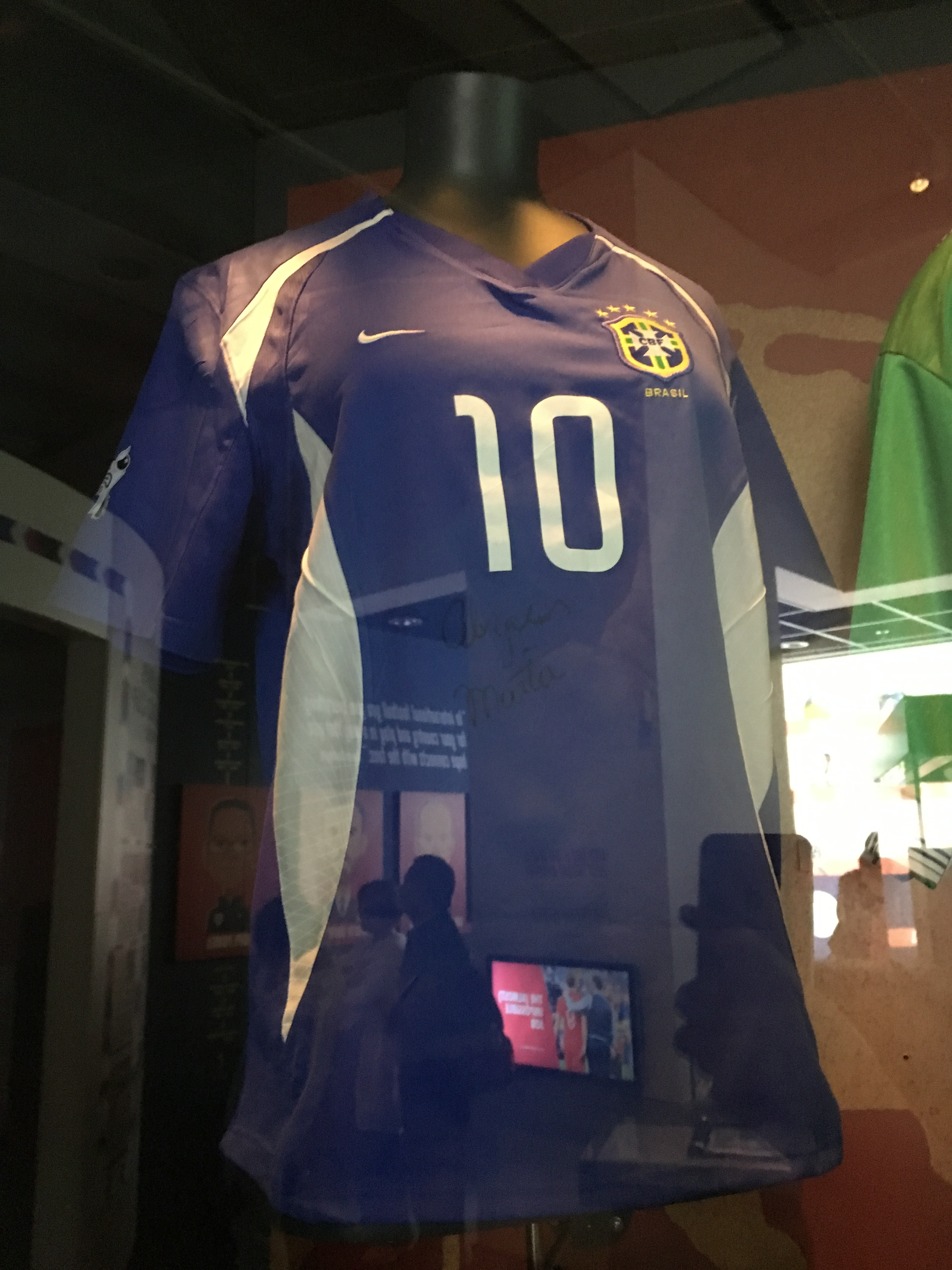
Marta's shirt from the 2003 FIFA Women's World Cup

=== 2002–2006 ===
Marta made her international debut for Brazil at the 2002 U-19 World Championships, where she scored six goals and was awarded the Silver Ball. She scored her first senior international goal at the 2003 Copa América and helped Brazil win the tournament. She then won a gold medal at the 2003 Pan American Games. She made her World Cup debut and scored off a penalty kick against South Korea. She scored another goal in the group stage against Norway to help Brazil win 4–1. In the quarter-finals against Sweden, Marta scored off a penalty kick, but Brazil still lost 1–2.

Marta represented Brazil at the 2004 Summer Olympics and scored three goals in the tournament to win the silver medal behind the United States. After the Olympics, she competed at the 2004 U-19 World Championships and led Brazil to a fourth-place finish and was awarded the Golden Ball.

=== 2007–2010 ===
On 26 July 2007, Marta scored two goals to beat the U.S. U-20 national team to win the Pan American Games at the Estádio do Maracanã in front of a crowd of 68,000. Afterward, the imprint of her feet was recorded in cement at the stadium, making her the first woman to be so honored.

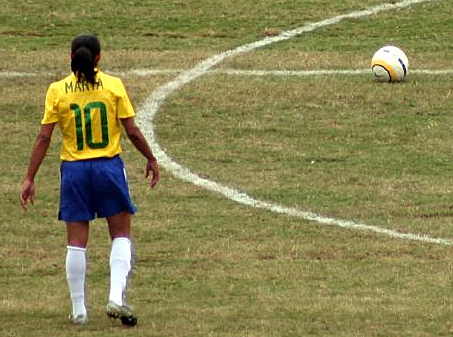
Marta wearing the Brazil number 10 during a match in the 2007 Pan American Games

Marta participated in the 2007 FIFA Women's World Cup with Brazil, who won three games in the group stage with Marta scoring four goals. In the quarter-final, Brazil won 3–2 against Australia, with Marta netting from the penalty spot. In the semi-final, Marta scored twice as Brazil won 4–0 against the United States. In the final, Brazil lost 2–0 to Germany. Marta had a penalty kick saved midway through the second half, which would have tied the match. She finished the 2007 Women's World Cup as the winner of both the Golden Ball as the top individual player and the 'Golden Boot' as the competition's top scorer with seven goals.

Marta played in the 2008 Summer Olympics, earning a silver medal. A 1–0 defeat consigned Marta to her third consecutive runners–up medal in a major international tournament. She scored eight goals in the 2010 Copa América to lead Brazil to the title.

=== 2011–2014 ===
Marta was part of the Brazil team at the 2011 FIFA Women's World Cup, where the United States eliminated Brazil in the quarter-finals. Marta scored both of Brazil's goals in this game, but the team lost the penalty shoot-out. She recorded four goals and two assists in the tournament to move joint top of the all-time women's World Cup goalscorer list alongside Birgit Prinz on 14. It also earned her the Silver Boot as the tournament's second-leading goal scorer. She played at the 2012 Summer Olympics, where Brazil was knocked out by the reigning-World Cup champions Japan in the quarter-finals.

=== 2015–2018 ===
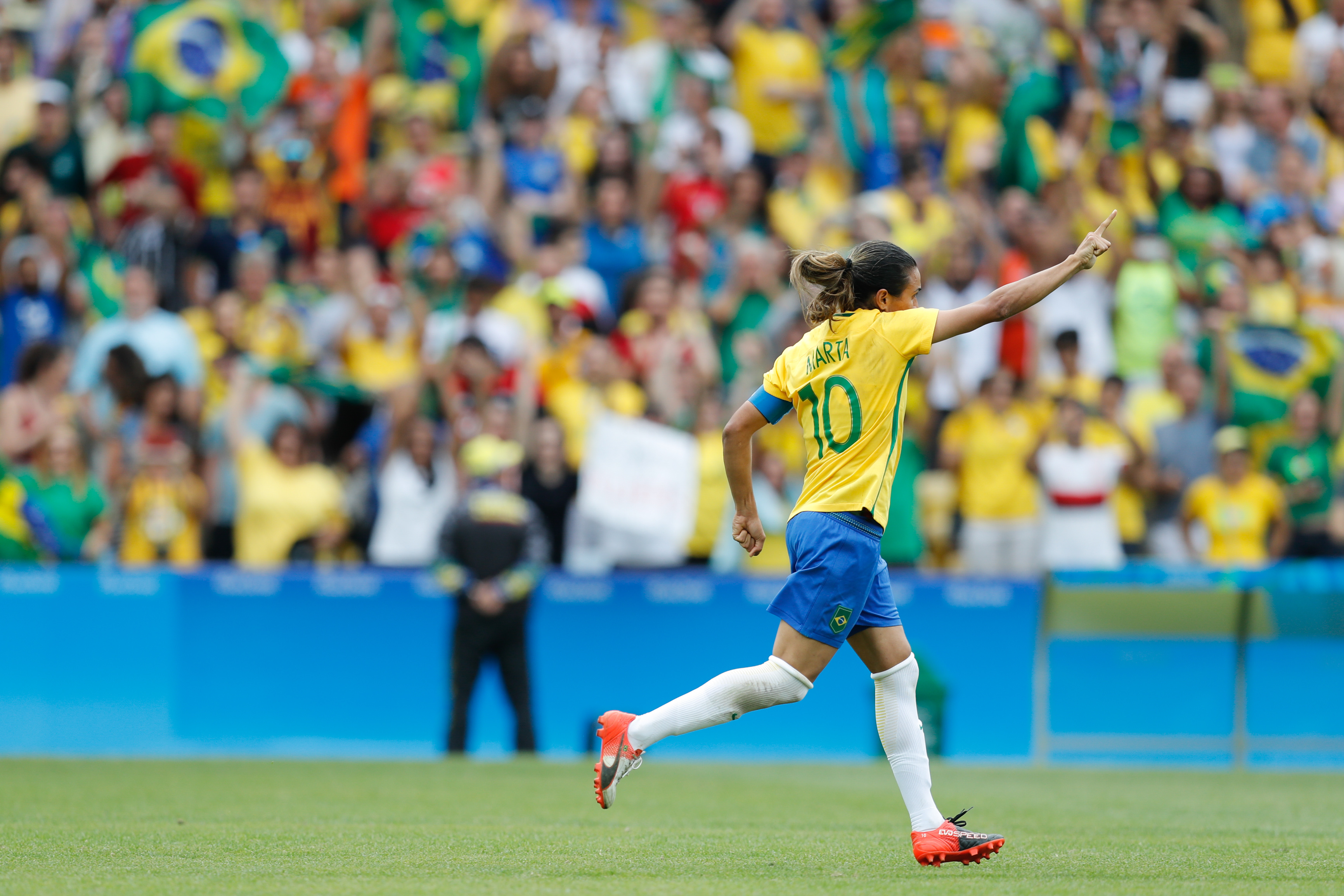
Marta playing at the 2016 Summer Olympics

During her fourth World Cup in 2015, Marta became the all-time top scorer of the women's tournament with 15 goals once she scored the second goal in Brazil's debut against South Korea. Brazil lost to Australia in the round-of-16. She represented Brazil at the 2016 Summer Olympics and scored two goals against Sweden to help Brazil win their group. In the quarter-finals game against Australia, Marta missed her penalty kick during the shoot-out, but Brazil still won. They played Sweden again in the semi-finals but lost a penalty shoot-out. At the 2018 Copa América, Marta helped Brazil defend its title.

=== 2019–2022 ===
During the 2019 FIFA Women's World Cup, she became the first player, male or female, to score at five FIFA World Cup tournaments when she scored a penalty against Australia in Brazil's second group game. In the next match, she scored another penalty, this time against Italy, to become the outright leading goal-scorer, male or female, at the World Cup, with 17 goals in total. After Brazil were knocked out by hosts France in the Round of 16, Marta gave an emotional interview to television cameras where she pleaded with Brazilian girls to continue the legacy of ageing legends such as herself, Formiga, and Cristiane. She implored them to "value [women's football] more" and to "cry at the beginning so you can smile at the end." The interview went viral during the tournament, with videos getting tens of thousands of retweets on Twitter.

Marta played for Brazil at the 2020 Summer Olympics, which were held in 2021 due to the COVID-19 pandemic. On 21 July 2021, she scored twice in a 5–0 win against China to become the first player to score in five straight Olympics. Brazil went on to lose a penalty shoot-out to Canada in the quarter-finals.

=== 2023–present ===
At the 2023 Women's World Cup, Marta entered as a late substitute in Brazil's first two group-stage games and as a starter in the third. She didn't score, and Brazil exited the tournament at the group stage with a 1-1-1 record.

On 26 April 2024, Marta announced her retirement from international football following the 2024 Summer Olympics. In Brazil's final group play match against Spain in those Olympics, Marta accidentally kicked Olga Carmona in the head during first-half stoppage time and received a red card, resulting in a two-game suspension. She returned in the final, and Marta received her third Olympic silver medal following a 1–0 loss to the United States.

After initially retiring from the national team following the 2024 Olympics, Marta came out of retirement to represent Brazil in the 2025 Copa América Femenina. She returned for a pair of friendlies against Japan in May and was subsequently included in the Copa América squad. She played a crucial role in Brazil's victory in the final, scoring a late equalizer and contributing in the penalty shootout.

== Player profile ==
=== Style of play ===
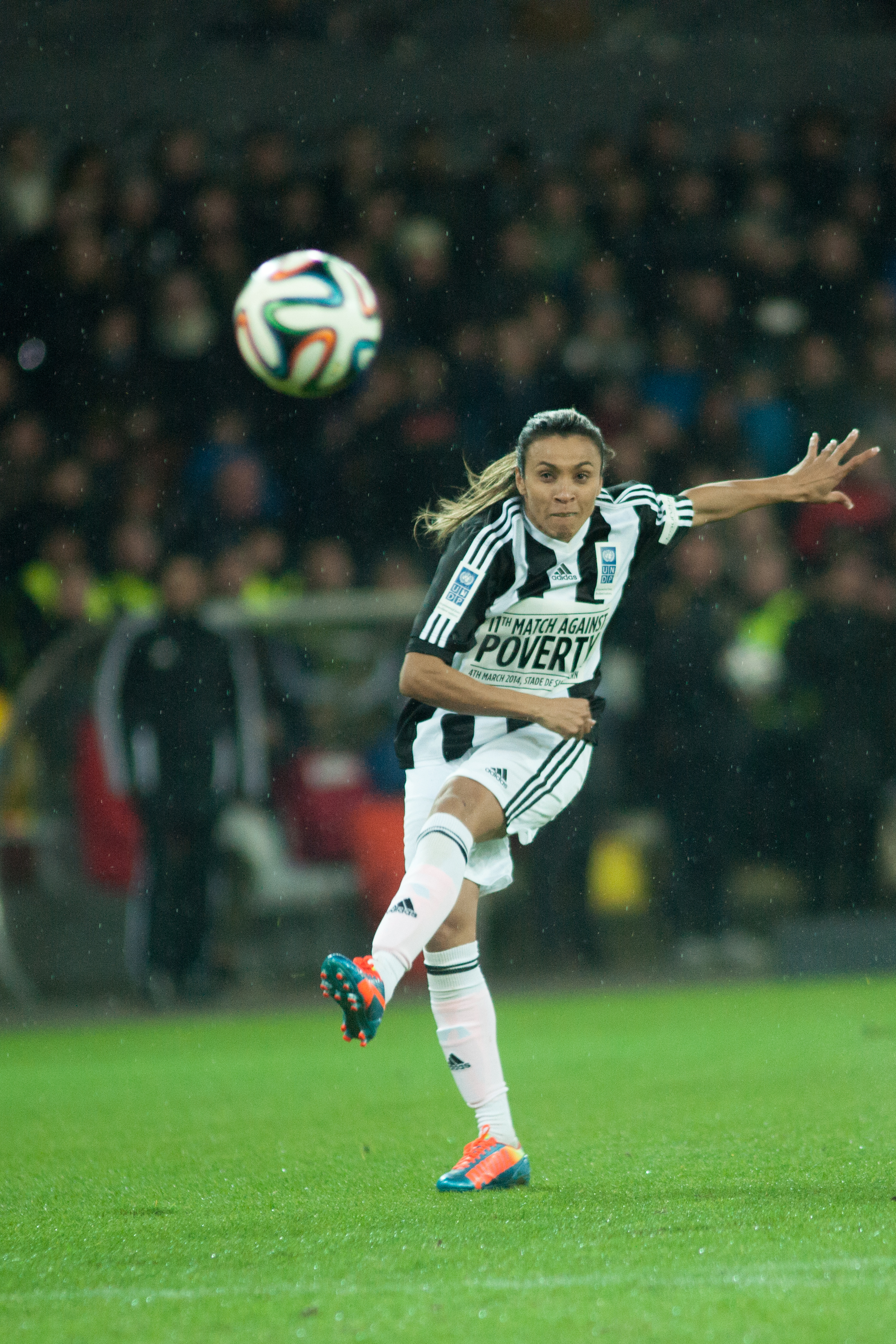
Marta playing in the Match Against Poverty in March 2014

A short yet sturdy player, Marta is known for her quick feet and on-the-ball skills which have earned her comparisons with notable Brazilian players including Ronaldinho, Romário, and also Pelé, who dubbed her Pelé with skirts. In addition to her vision and technical skills, Marta is often praised for her pace when dribbling. She has played in several offensive positions: she began her career in an offensive midfield role (as a classic number 10), although she has since been deployed in more high-pushing roles, both as a supporting forward and as a main striker, or even on the wing, a position which has allowed her to cut into the middle and shoot with her stronger left foot. Although primarily known as a playmaker, Marta is also a prolific goalscorer from both penalties and set-pieces.

=== Public perception and reception ===
Marta has been described by some sports journalists and fellow players as one of the best female footballers of her generation, and of all time, with some pundits, players, and managers regarding her as the greatest female footballer in the history of the game.

In 2024, the FIFA Marta Award was established to be awarded to the women's association football player judged to have scored the most aesthetically significant, or "most beautiful", goal of the calendar year; Marta herself won the inaugural award.

In addition to her footballing abilities, Marta has also been praised for her on-field leadership.

== Outside football ==
Marta's life and football prowess was depicted in the 2005 Sveriges Television (SVT) documentary Marta – Pelés kusin ("Marta – Pelé's cousin"). She also appeared in the 2013 SVT documentary series The Other Sport. In 2017, Swedish sports journalist Anja Gatu released a children's book titled Gå på mål, Marta (Get to goal, Marta) that told the story of Marta's childhood.

In 2010, Marta was named a United Nations (UN) Development Programme Goodwill Ambassador until 2018 when she was named a UN Women Goodwill Ambassador for women in sports. She became the first UN Women Goodwill Ambassador from Latin America. She spoke about equality in women's football in the 2013 CNN documentary An Uneven Playing Field. In 2019, she was appointed by the Secretary-General of the United Nations as a Sustainable Development Goals advocate. LATAM Airlines Brasil named Marta their "Global Leader of Diversity and Inclusion" in 2022 and featured her in television commercials. Marta launched a sportswear brand named Go Equal in 2023 and donated all royalties from product sales to football-related organizations that promote female leadership in the sport.

Marta was named one of the six ambassadors of the 2014 FIFA World Cup in Brazil, alongside Amarildo, Bebeto, Carlos Alberto Torres, Ronaldo and Mario Zagallo. In 2016, she was listed as one of BBC's 100 Women.

== Personal life ==
Marta was born in Dois Riachos, Alagoas, where she first learned to play football in the streets with boys. She has three siblings, José, Valdir, and Angela. Her parents are Aldário and Tereza. Her father left the family while Marta was a baby. She moved away from her family at the age of 14 to pursue a professional football career. She is fluent in Portuguese, Spanish, Swedish and English. She is a Catholic and states that God is very important to her, although she does not go to church often.

In March 2017, Marta received Swedish citizenship. She retained her Brazilian citizenship and, having already been capped by Brazil, it did not make her eligible to represent Sweden. She gained a U.S. green card in February 2021, giving her permanent residency status and also qualifying her as a domestic player for NWSL roster purposes.

In January 2021, after several years of dating, Marta announced she was engaged to Orlando Pride teammate Toni Pressley. The engagement was later called off. Since 2022, Marta has been in a relationship with her Orlando Pride teammate Carrie Lawrence. They announced their engagement in August 2024, and were married in Florida on 2 January, 2026.

== Career statistics ==
=== Club ===
As of 2 October 2026

Appearances and goals by club, season and competition
Club	Season	League			Cup		Continental		Total	
Club	Season	Division	Apps	Goals	Apps	Goals	Apps	Goals	Apps	Goals
Umeå IK	2003	Damallsvenskan	–		–		4	5	4	5
Umeå IK	2004	Damallsvenskan	13	20	2	4	1	0	16	24
Umeå IK	2005	Damallsvenskan	11	20	2	2	–		13	22
Umeå IK	2006	Damallsvenskan	12	18	–		6	6	18	24
Umeå IK	2007	Damallsvenskan	7	14	3	6	6	5	16	25
Umeå IK	2008	Damallsvenskan	18	23	–		5	9	23	32
Los Angeles Sol	2009	WPS	20	10	–		–		20	10
Santos	2009	Série A	–		7	18	6	7	13	25
Gold Pride	2010	WPS	25	20	–		–		25	20
Santos	2011	Série A	–		–		4	2	4	2
Western New York Flash	2011	WPS	15	10	–		–		15	10
Tyresö	2012	Damallsvenskan	21	12	4	4	–		25	16
Tyresö	2013	Damallsvenskan	15	12	1	1	8	7	24	20
Tyresö	2014	Damallsvenskan	2	3	1	1	–		3	4
Rosengård	2014	Damallsvenskan	9	5	5	2	6	4	20	11
Rosengård	2015	Damallsvenskan	21	8	5	5	6	5	32	18
Rosengård	2016	Damallsvenskan	19	13	4	0	6	0	29	13
Orlando Pride	2017	NWSL	23	13	–		–		23	13
Orlando Pride	2018	NWSL	17	4	–		–		17	4
Orlando Pride	2019	NWSL	14	6	–		–		14	6
Orlando Pride	2020	NWSL	4 (Note: Includes the NWSL Fall Series)	0	–		–		4	0
Orlando Pride	2021	NWSL	19	4	4	0	–		23	4
Orlando Pride	2022	NWSL	0	0	2	0	–		2	0
Orlando Pride	2023	NWSL	18	4	0	0	–		18	4
Orlando Pride	2024	NWSL	23	9	–		–		23	9
Orlando Pride	2025	NWSL	22	4	3	0	1	1	26	5
Orlando Pride	2026	NWSL	16	2	–		–		16	2
Career total			364	234	43	43	59	51	462	323

=== International ===
As of 2 August 2025, Marta has scored 122 goals in her 213 appearances for the Brazil women's national football team.

== Honours ==
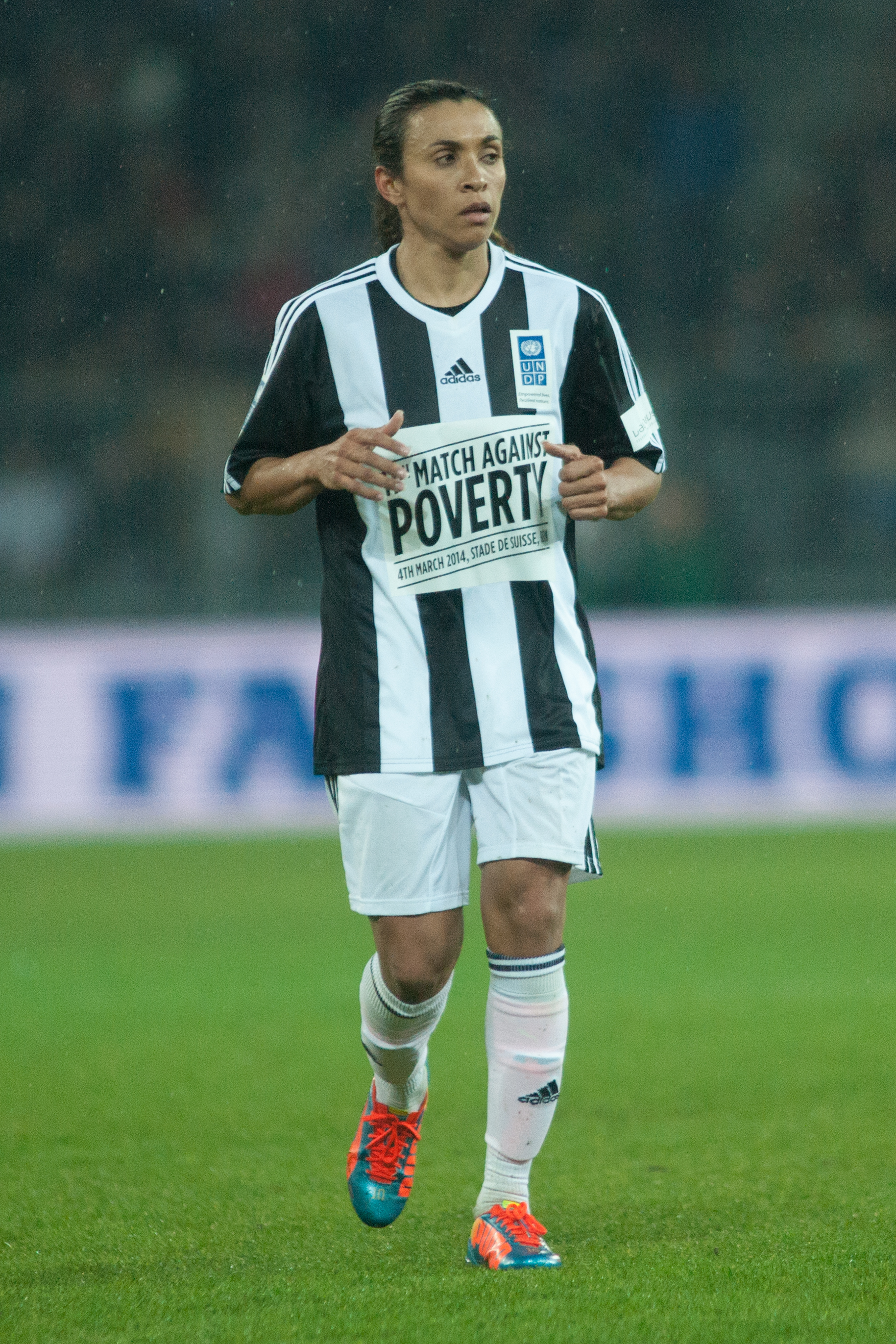
Marta during the 2014 Match Against Poverty in Bern, Switzerland

Umeå IK

- Damallsvenskan: 2005, 2006, 2007, 2008
- Svenska Cupen: 2007
- UEFA Women's Cup: 2003–04; runner-up: 2006–07, 2007–08

Santos

- Copa Libertadores de Fútbol Femenino: 2009
- Copa do Brasil de Futebol Feminino: 2009

FC Gold Pride

- WPS Championship: 2010

Western New York Flash

- WPS Championship: 2011

Tyresö FF

- Damallsvenskan: 2012
- UEFA Women's Champions League runner-up: 2013–14

FC Rosengård

- Damallsvenskan: 2014, 2015

Orlando Pride

- NWSL Championship: 2024
- NWSL Shield: 2024

Brazil

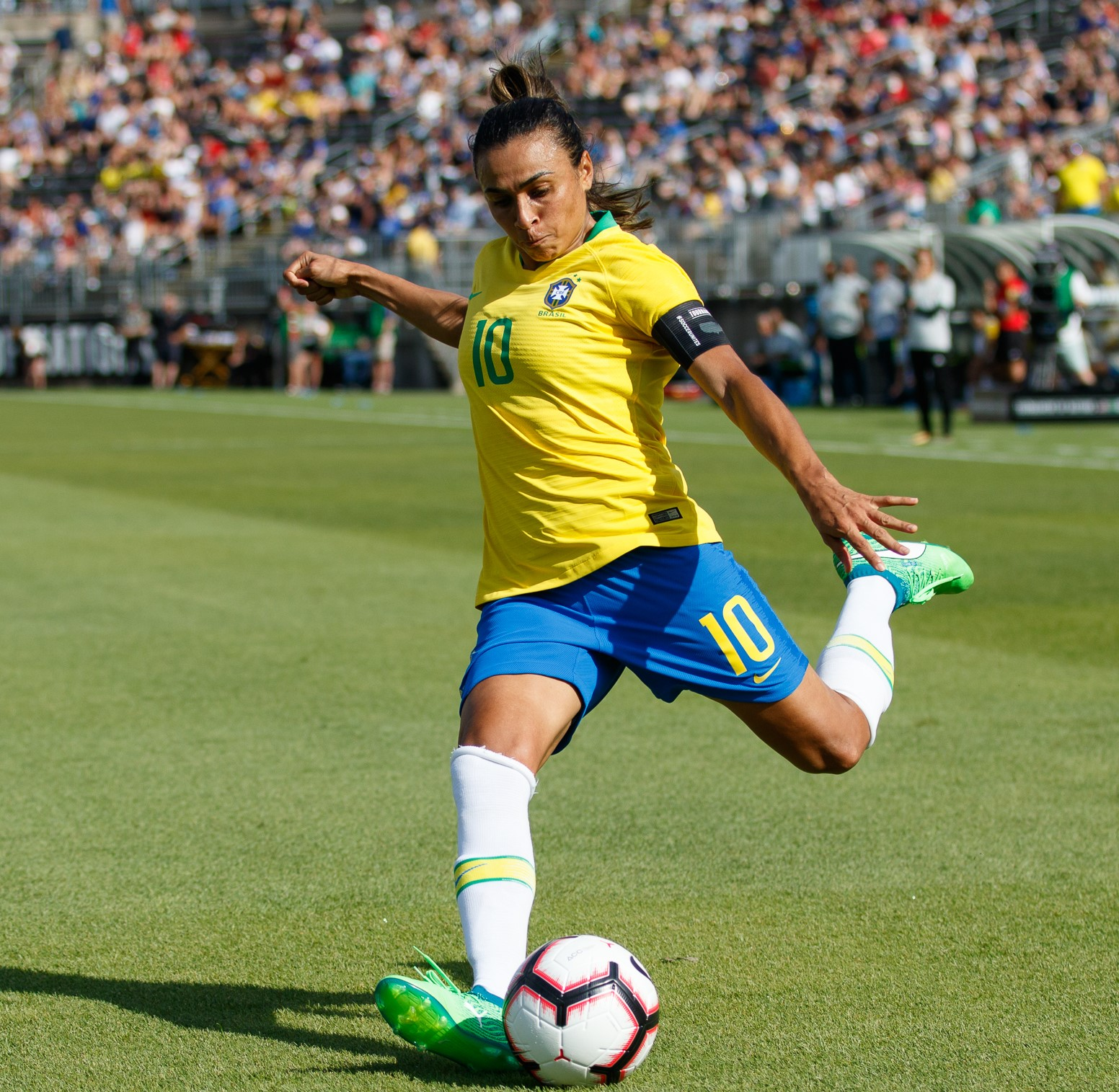
Marta playing for the Brazilian national team in 2018

- Pan American Games: 2003, 2007
- Sudamericano Femenino: 2003, 2010, 2018, 2025
- FIFA Women's World Cup runner-up: 2007
- Summer Olympics Silver Medal: 2004, 2008 2024

Individual

- FIFA World Player of the Year/The Best FIFA Women's Player – Winner (6): 2006, 2007, 2008, 2009, 2010, 2018
- The Best FIFA Women's Player – runner-up: 2016
- FIFPro World XI: 2016, 2017, 2019, 2021, 2024
- Damallsvenskan Top Scorer: 2004, 2005, 2008
- FIFA U-20 Women's World Cup Golden Ball: 2004
- FIFA Women's World Cup Golden Boot: 2007
- FIFA Women's World Cup Golden Ball: 2007
- FIFA Best Special Award: 2023
- WPS Golden Boot: 2009, 2010, 2011
- Michelle Akers Player of the Year Award: 2009, 2010
- Sudamericano Femenino Golden Boot: 2010
- Sports Illustrated Top 20 Female Athletes of the Decade (2000–2009) (#7)
- IFFHS World's Best Woman Playmaker: 2012
- IFFHS Women's World Team: 2018
- IFFHS World's Best Woman Player of the Decade 2011–2020
- IFFHS CONMEBOL Best Woman Player of the Decade 2011–2020
- IFFHS World's Woman Team of the Decade 2011–2020
- IFFHS CONMEBOL Woman Team of the Decade 2011–2020
- NWSL Best XI First Team: 2024
- FIFA Marta Award: 2024

Records

- FIFA Women's World Cup all-time record goalscorer (17)

== See also ==
- List of Olympic medalists in football
- List of women's footballers with 100 or more international caps
- List of women's footballers with 100 or more international goals
- List of top international women's football goal scorers by country
- List of women footballers with 300 or more goals
