= Linn Vickius =

Swedish footballer (born 2000)

Personal information
- Full name: Linn Victoria Vickius
- Date of birth: 3 April 2000 (age 26)
- Place of birth: Sweden
- Position: Midfielder

Team information
- Current team: Vålerenga
- Number: 8

Youth career
- IFK Västerås
- Eskilstuna United

Senior career*
Years	Team	Apps	(Gls)
2018–2022	Eskilstuna United	56	(0)
2019	→ IFK Norrköping (loan)	2	(0)
2021	→ IFK Norrköping (loan)	1	(0)
2023–	Vålerenga	66	(1)

International career^{‡}
2015–2016	Sweden U17	13	(0)
2018–2019	Sweden U19	9	(0)
2022–2023	Sweden U23	12	(2)
- * Club domestic league appearances and goals as of 4 October 2025 ‡ National team caps and goals as of 21 February 2023 (UTC)

Linn Victoria Vickius (born 3 April 2000) is a Swedish professional footballer who plays as a midfielder for Toppserien club Vålerenga.

== Club career ==
Vickius played youth football for IFK Västerås, before joining Eskilstuna United at the age of 16. She made her Damallsvenskan debut as a substitute against Limhamn Bunkeflo 07 on 9 September 2018. In 2020, she was ranked the fourth greatest talent in Damallsvenskan by Swedish newspaper Aftonbladet.

In January 2023 she signed a two-year deal with Norwegian club Vålerenga. She made her league debut against Arna-Bjørnar on 25 March 2023. In the 2025 Cup final she scored the first goal in a 2-0 win over Rosenborg.

== National team career ==
Vickius has international matches for U17, U19, and the U23 national team for Sweden.
