= Katarina Dybvik Sunde =

Norwegian footballer (born 1997)

Personal information
- Date of birth: 14 November 1997 (age 28)
- Position: Striker

Team information
- Current team: Aalesund
- Number: 9

Youth career
- –2013: Langevåg

Senior career*
Years	Team	Apps	(Gls)
2014–2015	Herd	25	(24)
2015–2018	Fortuna Ålesund	45	(29)
2018–2019	Byåsen	23	(11)
2019–2020	Arna-Bjørnar	16	(2)
2021–2024	Åsane	84	(35)
2025–	Aalesund	32	(36)
- * Club domestic league appearances and goals as of 22 June 2026

Katarina Dybvik Sunde (born 14 November 1997) is a Norwegian footballer who plays as a striker for Aalesunds FK.

== Career ==
She hails from Langevåg. Having started her youth career in Langevåg IL, she moved to Ålesund and the club SK Herd where she started here senior career on the fourth tier in 2014. In the summer of 2015 she moved to the larger club in the city, Fortuna Ålesund. Following a spell in Byåsen IL in the latter half of 2018, she moved to Bergen in 2019 and would play for Arna-Bjørnar and Åsane. She made her Toppserien debut for Arna-Bjørnar in September 2019 against Stabæk.

Moving to Åsane in 2021, she helped the club win promotion to the 2022 Toppserien. Sunde was not allowed to continue in Åsane after the 2024 season. Instead, she moved back to Ålesund, where Fortuna Ålesund was now called AaFK Fortuna (and from 2026 was fully integrated into Aalesunds FK).

The 2025 First Division was the best in Sunde's career thus far. She became top goalscorer with 22 goals, AaFK won promotion to the Toppserien, and Sunde was named First Division Player of the Year. Sunde was moreover top goalscorer of the 2025 Cup.

Aalesund immediately made their mark in the 2026 Toppserien, with Katarina Dybvik Sunde scoring both goals as the team beat reigning cup champions Vålerenga in the season opener. Aalesund eventually climbed to second in the league table. On 20 June 2026, Sunde scored an almost unprecedented 7 goals in an 8–1 routing of Bodø/Glimt. Sunde equalled Toppserien's record for most goals in a match, which had been set by Randi Leinan in 1997.

== Personal life ==
Sunde has spoken about a "tough" adolescence with ADHD.

Through her brother Christer, Katarina Dybvik Sunde is a sister-in-law of goalkeeper Cecilie Fiskerstrand.
