= Cara Martin =

American soccer player (born 2004)

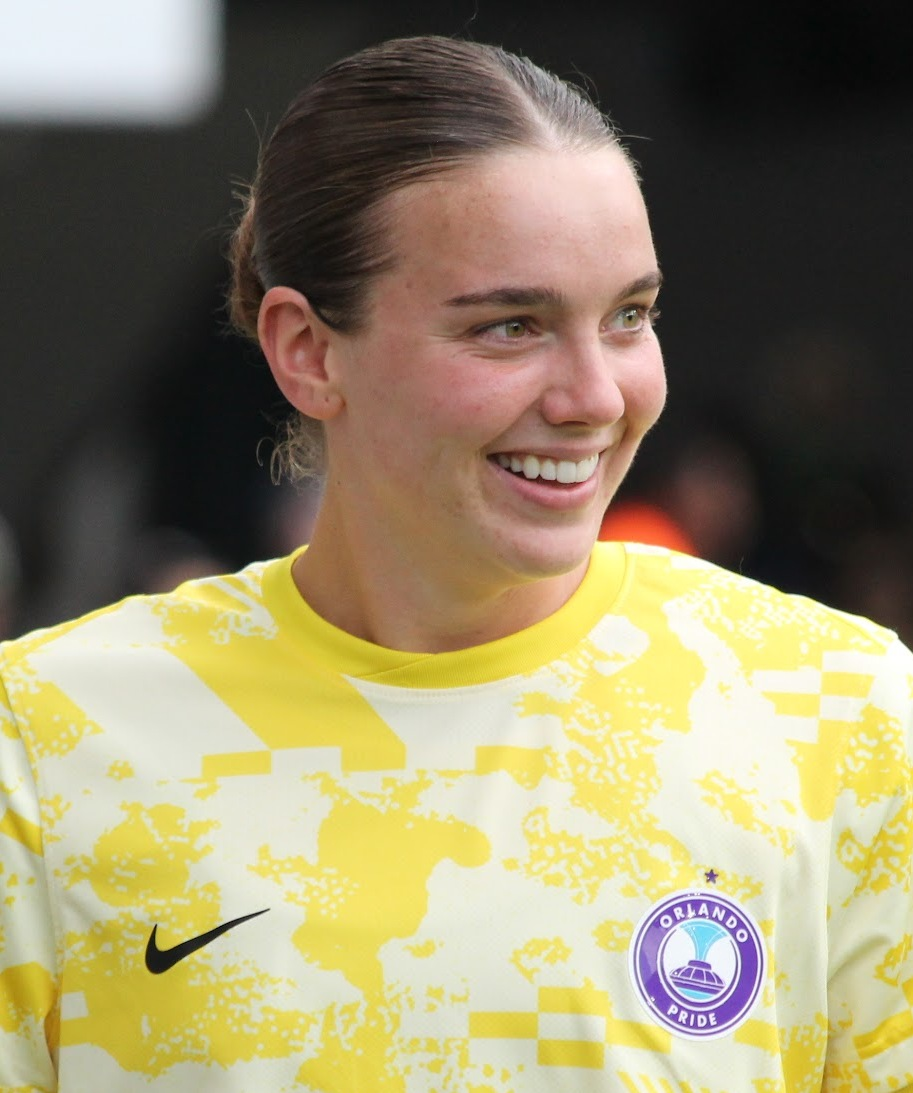
- Martin with the Orlando Pride in 2026

Personal information
- Full name: Cara Elizabeth Martin
- Date of birth: February 11, 2004 (age 22)
- Place of birth: Alexandria, Virginia, United States
- Height: 5 ft 11 in (1.80 m)
- Position: Goalkeeper

Team information
- Current team: Orlando Pride
- Number: 31

College career
Years	Team	Apps	(Gls)
2022-2025	Georgetown Hoyas	57	(0)

Senior career*
Years	Team	Apps	(Gls)
2026-	Orlando Pride	0	(0)
- * Club domestic league appearances and goals as of Jul 31, 2026

Cara Elizabeth Martin (born February 11, 2004) is an American professional soccer player who plays as a goalkeeper for the Orlando Pride of the National Women's Soccer League (NWSL). She played college soccer for the Georgetown Hoyas, where she was a two-time Big East Goalkeeper of the Year. She led NCAA Division I in goals against average in 2024 and earned third-team All-American honors in 2025.

== Early life ==
Martin is from Alexandria, Virginia, where she competed for the Alexandria City High School Titans in pole vault and soccer. In 2022, she earned soccer First Team All-State honors from the Virginia High School League. Martin played youth soccer for several clubs, culminating with the Arlington Soccer Association’s ECNL teams.

== College career ==
Martin played four seasons for the Georgetown Hoyas under head coach Dave Nolan. As a first-year in 2022, Martin started 10 games, recording six clean sheets and a 0.60 goals against average (GAA). After making only three appearances as a sophomore in 2023, she returned to the starting lineup in 2024.

In 2024, Martin led the nation with a 0.261 GAA, allowing only three goals in over 1,000 minutes of play. She helped Georgetown to 14 shutouts and was named the Big East Goalkeeper of the Year, ECAC Defensive Player of the Year, and a member of the United Soccer Coaches All-East Region Second Team.

In her senior season in 2025, Martin led the Hoyas to their first perfect 10–0 Big East regular season in program history. She recorded seven shutouts and a 0.51 GAA during the regular season. She repeated as Big East Goalkeeper of the Year and was named a third-team All-American.

== Club career ==
On January 16, 2026, the Orlando Pride announced they had signed Martin to her first professional contract. On August 27, 2026, the Orlando Pride announced a two-year contract extension for Martin, with a mutual option for 2029.

== Honors and awards ==
Georgetown Hoyas

- BIG EAST regular season champions: 2022, 2023, 2024, 2025
- BIG EAST tournament champions: 2022, 2023

Individual

- All-American Third Team: 2025
- BIG EAST Goalkeeper of the Year: 2024, 2025
- ECAC Defensive Player of the Year: 2024
- All-BIG EAST First Team: 2024, 2025
- All-East Region Second Team: 2024
- CSC Academic All-District: 2024, 2025
