= Nicole Payne =

Nigerian footballer (born 2001)

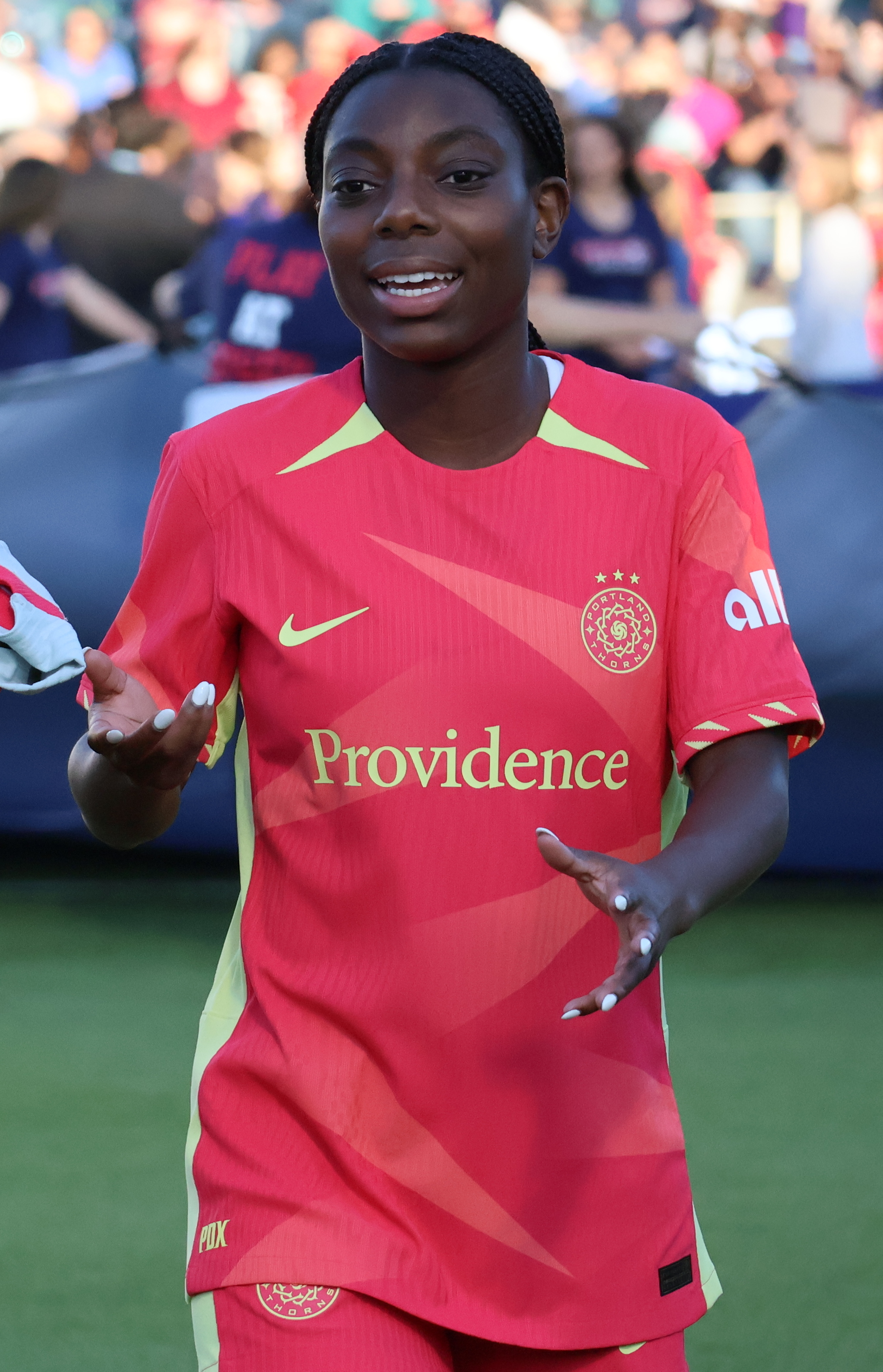
- Payne with the Portland Thorns in 2024

Personal information
- Full name: Nicole Oyeyemisi Payne
- Date of birth: 18 January 2001 (age 25)
- Place of birth: Birmingham, Alabama, U.S.
- Height: 1.65 m (5 ft 5 in)
- Position: Defender

Youth career
- Oak Mountain Eagles
- Concorde Fire

College career
Years	Team	Apps	(Gls)
2019–2021	West Virginia Mountaineers	53	(4)
2022	USC Trojans	16	(3)

Senior career*
Years	Team	Apps	(Gls)
2023–2024	Paris Saint-Germain	2	(0)
2024	→ Portland Thorns (loan)	9	(0)
2024–2025	Portland Thorns	10	(0)
2026	Orlando Pride	12	(1)

International career^{‡}
2017	United States U17	1	(0)
2018	United States U19	1	(0)
2021–	Nigeria	10	(0)
- * Club domestic league appearances and goals as of 03:28, 8 November 2026 (UTC) ‡ National team caps and goals as of 16 June 2021

Nicole Oyeyemisi Payne (born 18 January 2001) is a professional footballer who plays as a defender. Born in the United States, she plays for the Nigeria national team. She has previously played for Division 1 Feminine club Paris Saint-Germain and both the Portland Thorns and the Orlando Pride of the National Women's Soccer League (NWSL).

== Early life ==
Payne was born and raised in Birmingham, Alabama, where she attended Oak Mountain High School.

Payne attended West Virginia University in Morgantown, West Virginia for three years, transferring to the University of Southern California for her fourth and final year.

== Club career ==
Payne signed with Paris Saint-Germain of France's Division 1 Féminine in July 2023. Her first appearance (of four to date) for PSG came as a substitute in a 5–2 win over Dijon FCO on 12 November 2023, with her first start on 20 January 2024 in an 8–1 win over FC Girondins de Bordeaux.

In February 2024, she was loaned to the Portland Thorns of the National Women's Soccer League for the 2024 season. Five months into her loan, Payne was acquired permanently by the Thorns.

On 16 January 2026, the Orlando Pride announced that they had signed Payne to a one-year contract. She made 12 appearances in her lone season with the Pride and scored a goal against the San Diego Wave.

== International career ==
Payne was called up to the United States national under-17 team in 2017.

Payne made her senior debut for Nigeria on 10 June 2021 as a 90th-minute substitute in a 0–1 friendly loss to Jamaica.

Payne was called up to the Nigeria squad for the 2022 Women's Africa Cup of Nations.

Payne was called up to the Nigeria squad for the 2024 Summer Olympics.

== Personal life ==
Born in Birmingham, Alabama, to Nigerian parents, Payne is the younger sister of fellow footballers Toni Payne and Stephen Payne. She and her sister Toni have played together in the Nigeria women's national team.

== Honours ==
Paris Saint-Germain

- Coupe de France: 2023–24
