= Sanne Lekven =

Norwegian footballer (born 2001)

Personal information
- Full name: Sanne Bolette Dale Lekven
- Date of birth: 9 July 2001 (age 25)
- Position: Forward

Team information
- Current team: Orlando Pride
- Number: 22

Youth career
- Stord

Senior career*
Years	Team	Apps	(Gls)
2016–2019	Stord	71	(60)
2020	Sandviken	4	(0)
2021–2024	Viking	70	(33)
2024–2025	Arna-Bjørnar	34	(4)
2026	Aalesund	10	(5)
2026–	Orlando Pride	4	(0)

International career^{‡}
2017	Norway U16	1	(0)
2018	Norway U17	2	(0)
- * Club domestic league appearances and goals as of 03:24, 8 November 2026 (UTC) ‡ National team caps and goals as of 14 August 2026

Sanne Bolette Dale Lekven (born 9 July 2001) is a Norwegian professional footballer who plays as a forward for the Orlando Pride of the National Women's Soccer League (NWSL).

== Career ==
Lekven started her career in Stord IL. She made her senior debut in the 2016 Fourth Division, and then scored 19 goals in 20 matches in the 2017 Third Division. The next year she improved to 24 goals in 21 matches, winning promotion to the 2019 Second Division, where she managed 15 goals in 22 games. Notably in the U19 category, her team won the 2018 Norway Cup as Lekven was named woman of the match in the final.

Ahead of the 2020 season, Lekven made the move to the top level as she signed for IL Sandviken. She made her Toppserien debut in August 2020 against Klepp. She did however fail to break through and moved to Rogaland, choosing up-and-coming Viking FK over Klepp IL. She was reportedly on the radar of John Arne Riise's Avaldsnes IL. In the summer of 2024, she was recruited by Arna-Bjørnar.

As Arna-Bjørnar were relegated, several clubs competed to sign Lekven ahead of the 2026 season, and she chose Aalesunds FK. Aalesund immediately made their mark in the 2026 Toppserien, beating larger clubs with Lekven as one of the "key players". Lekven notably scored from a solo raid against Rosenborg, single-handedly bringing the ball over three fourths of the field. Lekven also scored the one goal in addition to the seven by Katarina Dybvik Sunde, in June's 8–1 routing of Bodø/Glimt. Moreover she helped her team reach the final of the 2026 Norwegian Women's Cup.

On 12 August 2026, it was announced that Lekven had joined the National Women's Soccer League (NWSL)'s Orlando Pride, signing a two-and-a-half-year contract with the club option for another year.
