= WPSL Pro =

Professional women's soccer league in the United States

- Organizing body: Women's Premier Soccer League
- Founded: 2023
- First season: 2027 (proposed)
- Country: United States
- Confederation: CONCACAF
- Number of clubs: 15
- Level on pyramid: Division II (proposed)
- Website: wpslpro.com

WPSL Pro is a planned professional women's soccer league at the second level of the United States league system, setting one level below the National Women's Soccer League and USL Super League.

== History ==
Women's Premier Soccer League (WPSL) announced the formation of the WPSL Pro on February 8, 2023. The league was planned as a Division III Professional League, that would start in 2025. The WPSL announced that WPSL Pro will help provide new avenues of development for players, coaches, and staff. The league plans for ten teams the first year, with a goal of 24 teams by 2030.

In August 2023, WPSL Pro announced they had received their first five letters of intent (LOIs). The teams were Oklahoma City FC, Sioux Falls City FC, SouthStar FC, Austin Rise FC, and The Town FC. In February 2024, Georgia Impact FC signed their LOI, becoming the sixth team to do so. With Georgia Impact FC joining WPSL Pro, it will become the first team with a youth to professional pipeline in the league. In addition, by becoming the sixth team, Georgia Impact FC puts the WPSL Pro in a position to meet the minimal sanctioning guidelines. Later in February 2024, AC Houston Sur signed a LOI with WPSL Pro, becoming the seventh overall team and third team from Texas to commit to the new league. Two days later, WPSL Pro announced the eighth team has signed the LOI, welcoming Dakota Fusion FC to the league. Dakota Fusion FC is the first team to announce they would officially start in the 2026 season. In July 2024, WPSL Pro announced they had received their ninth LOI from a group led by Gina Prodan Kelly to set up a team in Northeast Ohio. In August 2024, WPSL Pro received their tenth LOI from Soda City FC, announcing their intent to bring a professional women's soccer team to South Carolina. In September 2024, WPSL Pro announced three more LOIs, the first from Wichita, Kansas, the second Indios Denver FC from Denver, Colorado, and the third from Southern California. On January 8, 2025 WPSL Pro announced a 14th team had signed a letter of intent. Northern Colorado Rain FC signed the LOI with plans to start in the WPSL Pro league in 2026. On March 12, 2025, WPSL Pro announced Real Central NJ had announced they would join the league for the 2027 season. In April 2025, Cleveland Soccer Group announced that they would join WPSL Pro after not being selected as an expansion city for the National Women's Soccer League. This makes Cleveland the 16th team to announce their intention to join the league.

=== Division II ===
In April 2025 WPSL announced that WPSL Pro would launch in 2026 as a Division II league instead of the originally planned Division III.

In September 2025 it was reported the league will now start in 2027 and is currently seeking sanctioning from US Soccer.

== Teams ==
Teams planned to join the WPSL Pro.

Team	City	Stadium	Capacity	Founded	Joining	Head coach
AC Houston Sur	Houston, Texas	The Village School	250	2021	TBD	(United States) Jonathan Giraldo
Cleveland Astra	Cleveland, Ohio	Gateway South Stadium	10,000	2025	2028	TBA
Dakota Fusion FC	Moorhead, Minnesota	Jim Gotta Stadium	3,000	2016	TBD	(Canada) Chris Andreason
Georgia Impact SC	Atlanta, Georgia	Tommy Baker Field	4,000	2024	TBD	(Scotland) Robert Roddie
Indios Denver FC	Denver, Colorado	Pinnacle Athletic Complex	2,000	2019	TBD	(To be determined) Juan Martinez
Northern Colorado Rain FC	Windsor, Colorado	TicketSocket Park	6,500	2024	TBD	(United States) Kelly Brown
Oklahoma City FC	Oklahoma City, Oklahoma	Mustang High School	600	2007	TBD	(United States) Daniel Gibson
Real Central NJ	Lawrence Township, New Jersey	Ben Cohen Field	1,000	2000	TBD	(United States) Brian Thomsen
Sioux Falls City FC	Sioux Falls, South Dakota	Bob Young Field	5,000	2022	TBD	(United States) Dale Weiler
SoCal WPSL Pro	Southern California			2024	TBD	TBA
Soda City FC	Columbia, South Carolina	WC Hawkins Stadium Irmo	3,000	2018	TBD	(United States) John Collins
SouthStar FC	Addison, Texas	Mean Green Soccer Stadium	1,500	2019	TBD	(United States) Casey Loyd
The Town FC	Moraga, California	Saint Mary's Stadium	5,500	2024	TBD	(United States) Lauren Nadler
FC Wichita	Wichita, Kansas	Stryker Soccer Complex	6,100	2024	TBD	(England) Kieran Laking

=== Location map ===
WPSL Pro Future club

== League leadership ==
Title	Name
President	Sean Jones
CEO	Anne Hoge
Vice president	DeBray Ayala
Vice president	Brad Lund
Commissioner	Kendra Halterman
