= 2025 WPSL season =

Women's Premier Soccer League
- Season: 2025
- Dates: May 9 – July 6 (regular season); July 12 – 13 (regional playoffs); July 18–20 (WPSL Championship)
- Champion: Sporting CT
- Matches: 673
- Goals: 2,343 (3.48 per match)
- Biggest home win: Indios Denver FC 13–0 Colorado Blizzard FC (6/8)
- Biggest away win: Kingston Capitals 0–16 New York Shockers (6/5)
- Highest scoring: Kingston Capitals 0–16 New York Shockers (6/5)
- Longest winning run: Pensacola FC (9 wins)
- Longest unbeaten run: Pensacola FC (9 wins)
- Longest losing run: 3 teams at 10 losses
- All statistics correct as of 23:46, July 21, 2025 (UTC).

The 2025 Women's Premier Soccer League season is the 27th season of the WPSL. This season the WPSL will consist of 152 teams across 16 conferences, throughout 32 states

== Team changes ==
=== New teams ===
- Albany Rush
- Baton Rouge United
- FC Monmouth
- FC PrimeTime
- Florida Roots
- Fort Worth Vaqueras
- Gulf Coast United
- Hattiesburg FC
- Internationals Soccer Club
- Jackson Ignite
- LA Krew Rush
- Milwaukee City AFC
- Mississippi Blues SC
- Northern Colorado Rain FC
- Pensacola FC
- Pensacola FC Academy
- Peoria City
- PHX Heat FC
- San Diego Dons
- Shreveport United
- Sporting CT
- TN Tempo FC
- TLH Reckoning
- Union 10 FC
- Union KC
- WPSL Peoria (AZ)

=== Returning Teams ===
- Corinthians FC of San Antonio
- FC Dallas
- Kingston Capitals
- Soda City FC

=== Departing Teams ===
- Ambassadors Cleveland
- Broomfield Burn
- Cape Coral Cyclones
- Charlotte Eagles
- Classics Elite SA
- Cleveland Ambassadors
- Dade County Football Club
- Dakota Fusion FC
- Dayton Dutch Lions WFC
- FC Nashville Wolves
- FC Spirit
- Houston Aces
- MapleBrook Fury
- Miss Kick FC
- Neuse River Futbol Alliance
- Nevada Futbol Club
- NJ Wizards SC
- Northern Utah United
- Rochester United FC
- RSL Southern Arizona
- San Antonio Runners
- Sioux Falls City FC
- Trinity Fire
- Utah Red Devils
- Washington Dutch Lions FC

== Standings ==
=== Central Region ===
==== Lone Star Conference ====
Pos	Team	Pld	W	L	T	GF	GA	GD	Pts	PPG	Qualification
1	Austin Rise FC (Q)	10	7	2	1	18	8	+10	22	2.20	Conference Playoffs
2	SouthStar FC	10	7	3	0	22	13	+9	21	2.10	
3	FC Dallas	9	6	2	1	30	8	+22	19	2.11	
4	Futbolera Select	9	2	4	3	12	21	−9	9	1.00	
5	Fort Worth Vaqueras	10	1	6	3	8	28	−20	6	0.60	
6	Corinthians FC of San Antonio	8	0	6	2	6	22	−16	2	0.25	

Updated to match(es) played on July 6, 2025. Source: WPSL standings
Rules for classification: 1) Head-to-head based on total points; 2) Total wins; 3) Goal difference all league games; 4) Goals scored in league games
(Q) Qualified for the phase indicated

==== Midwest Conference ====
===== Gateway Division =====
Pos	Team	Pld	W	L	T	GF	GA	GD	Pts	PPG	Qualification
1	Lou Fusz Athletic (Q)	8	7	0	1	24	5	+19	22	2.75	Division Playoffs
2	FC Pride	8	5	2	1	17	11	+6	16	2.00	
3	Peoria City	8	5	3	0	19	8	+11	15	1.88	
4	Missouri Reign	8	2	6	0	8	16	−8	6	0.75	
5	Junction FC	8	0	8	0	2	34	−32	0	0.00	

Updated to match(es) played on July 6, 2025. Source: WPSL standings
Rules for classification: 1) Head-to-head based on total points; 2) Total wins; 3) Goal difference all league games; 4) Goals scored in league games
(Q) Qualified for the phase indicated

===== Heartland Division =====
Pos	Team	Pld	W	L	T	GF	GA	GD	Pts	PPG	Qualification
1	Oklahoma City FC (Q)	10	8	0	2	36	7	+29	26	2.60	Division Playoffs
2	Union KC	10	5	1	4	21	10	+11	19	1.90	
3	Sunflower State FC	10	5	4	1	19	19	0	16	1.60	
4	FC Wichita	10	3	4	3	9	19	−10	12	1.20	
5	Kansas City Current II	10	1	7	2	5	12	−7	5	0.50	
6	Side FC 92	10	1	7	2	5	28	−23	5	0.50	

Updated to match(es) played on July 6, 2025. Source: WPSL standings
Rules for classification: 1) Head-to-head based on total points; 2) Total wins; 3) Goal difference all league games; 4) Goals scored in league games
(Q) Qualified for the phase indicated

==== Mountain Conference ====
===== Rockies Division =====
Pos	Team	Pld	W	L	T	GF	GA	GD	Pts	PPG
1	Northern Colorado Rain FC	8	7	1	0	28	5	+23	21	2.63
2	PSD Academy	8	6	2	0	25	6	+19	18	2.25
3	Colorado Pride	8	5	3	0	14	11	+3	15	1.88
4	Indios Denver FC	8	2	6	0	22	19	+3	6	0.75
5	Colorado Blizzard FC	8	0	8	0	1	79	−78	0	0.00

First match(es) will be played: July 6, 2025. Source: WPSL standings
Rules for classification: 1) Head-to-head based on total points; 2) Total wins; 3) Goal difference all league games; 4) Goals scored in league games

===== Wasatch Division =====
Pos	Team	Pld	W	L	T	GF	GA	GD	Pts	PPG
1	Utah Avalanche	10	7	1	2	30	12	+18	23	2.30
2	Utah Surf	10	6	0	4	34	10	+24	22	2.20
3	La Roca FC	10	6	1	3	27	9	+18	21	2.10
4	MetaSport FC	10	3	5	2	21	19	+2	11	1.10
5	City SC Utah	10	2	7	1	14	34	−20	7	0.70
6	Griffins FC	10	0	10	0	4	60	−56	0	0.00

Updated to match(es) played on July 6, 2025. Source: WPSL standings
Rules for classification: 1) Head-to-head based on total points; 2) Total wins; 3) Goal difference all league games; 4) Goals scored in league games

==== North Lakes Conference ====
===== Lake Michigan Division =====
Pos	Team	Pld	W	L	T	GF	GA	GD	Pts	PPG	Qualification
1	FC Milwaukee Torrent (Q)	10	8	0	2	29	6	+23	26	2.60	Division Playoffs
2	Bavarian United SC	10	7	1	2	32	13	+19	23	2.30	
3	Chicago House AC	10	5	4	1	21	12	+9	16	1.60	
4	Green Bay Glory	10	5	4	1	20	17	+3	16	1.60	
5	Chicago KICS Football Club	10	1	9	0	11	37	−26	3	0.30	
6	Milwaukee City AFC	10	1	9	0	7	45	−38	3	0.30	

Updated to match(es) played on June 29, 2025. Source: WPSL standings
Rules for classification: 1) Head-to-head based on total points; 2) Total wins; 3) Goal difference all league games; 4) Goals scored in league games
(Q) Qualified for the phase indicated

===== Land of Lakes Division =====
Pos	Team	Pld	W	L	T	GF	GA	GD	Pts	PPG	Qualification
1	St. Croix Soccer Club (Q)	8	6	1	1	24	15	+9	19	2.38	Division Playoffs
2	Minnesota Thunder	8	6	1	1	18	10	+8	19	2.38	
3	Salvo SC	8	6	2	0	29	6	+23	18	2.25	
4	MN Bliss FC	8	4	3	1	10	15	−5	13	1.63	
5	Mankato United Soccer Club	8	2	4	2	9	14	−5	8	1.00	
6	Minnesota Dutch Lions FC	8	1	3	4	6	15	−9	7	0.88	
7	Joy AC	8	1	6	1	6	19	−13	4	0.50	
8	Manitou F.C.	8	1	7	0	6	23	−17	3	0.38	

Updated to match(es) played on June 29, 2025. Source: WPSL standings
Rules for classification: 1) Head-to-head based on total points; 2) Total wins; 3) Goal difference all league games; 4) Goals scored in league games
(Q) Qualified for the phase indicated

=== East Region ===
==== Great Lakes Conference ====
===== Great River Division =====
Pos	Team	Pld	W	L	T	GF	GA	GD	Pts	PPG
1	Columbus Eagles FC	8	8	0	0	26	3	+23	24	3.00
2	Greater Toledo FC	8	4	3	1	7	12	−5	13	1.63
3	FC Dayton	8	4	3	1	14	9	+5	13	1.63
4	Corktown WFC	8	1	6	1	5	17	−12	4	0.50
5	Beadling Soccer Club	8	1	6	1	5	16	−11	4	0.50

Updated to match(es) played on June 29, 2025. Source: WPSL standings
Rules for classification: 1) Head-to-head based on total points; 2) Total wins; 3) Goal difference all league games; 4) Goals scored in league games

===== Lake Erie Division =====
Pos	Team	Pld	W	L	T	GF	GA	GD	Pts	PPG
1	Internationals Soccer Club	8	7	0	1	26	1	+25	22	2.75
2	Niagara 1812	8	3	3	2	10	18	−8	11	1.38
3	BC United	7	3	4	0	7	13	−6	9	1.29
4	RNY FC	8	2	4	2	10	13	−3	8	1.00
5	Erie FC	7	0	4	3	7	20	−13	3	0.43

Updated to match(es) played on June 28, 2025. Source: WPSL standings
Rules for classification: 1) Head-to-head based on total points; 2) Total wins; 3) Goal difference all league games; 4) Goals scored in league games

==== Metropolitan Conference ====
Pos	Team	Pld	W	L	T	GF	GA	GD	Pts	PPG	Qualification
1	Clarkstown Soccer Club	8	7	0	1	20	3	+17	22	2.75	
2	Brooklyn City F.C. (Q)	8	5	3	0	20	14	+6	15	1.88	Conference Playoffs
3	Downtown United Soccer Club	8	5	3	0	14	13	+1	15	1.88	
4	SUSA FC	8	4	4	0	11	12	−1	12	1.50	
5	New York Athletic Club	8	3	3	2	16	9	+7	11	1.38	
6	STA	8	3	4	1	12	16	−4	10	1.25	
7	Force FC New York	8	3	5	0	13	12	+1	9	1.13	
8	New York Dutch Lions FC	8	0	8	0	3	30	−27	0	0.00	

Updated to match(es) played on June 29, 2025. Source: WPSL standings
Rules for classification: 1) Head-to-head based on total points; 2) Total wins; 3) Goal difference all league games; 4) Goals scored in league games
(Q) Qualified for the phase indicated

==== Mid-Atlantic Conference ====
===== Colonial Division =====
Pos	Team	Pld	W	L	T	GF	GA	GD	Pts	PPG	Qualification
1	SJEB FC (Q)	10	7	2	1	29	13	+16	22	2.20	Division Playoffs
2	FC Monmouth	10	5	3	2	19	18	+1	17	1.70	
3	Delaware Ospreys	10	5	4	1	15	14	+1	16	1.60	
4	Penn Fusion SA	10	5	5	0	17	18	−1	15	1.50	
5	Philadelphia Ukrainian Nationals - Liberty	10	4	4	2	17	20	−3	14	1.40	
6	Real Central NJ	10	4	5	1	13	16	−3	13	1.30	
7	Fever SC	10	0	7	3	4	20	−16	3	0.30	

Updated to match(es) played on updated. Source: WPSL standings
Rules for classification: 1) Head-to-head based on total points; 2) Total wins; 3) Goal difference all league games; 4) Goals scored in league games
(Q) Qualified for the phase indicated

===== Commonwealth Division =====
Pos	Team	Pld	W	L	T	GF	GA	GD	Pts	PPG	Qualification
1	Reading United A.C.	10	7	0	3	30	9	+21	24	2.40	
2	PA Classics (Q)	10	5	1	4	34	14	+20	19	1.90	Division Playoffs
3	Keystone FC	10	6	2	2	20	9	+11	20	2.00	
4	Hex FC Tempest	10	5	4	1	18	16	+2	16	1.60	
5	LVU Rush	10	3	6	1	12	25	−13	10	1.00	
6	West-Mont United	10	2	6	2	9	29	−20	8	0.80	
7	Hershey FC	10	0	9	1	3	29	−26	1	0.10	

Updated to match(es) played on June 28, 2025. Source: WPSL standings
Rules for classification: 1) Head-to-head based on total points; 2) Total wins; 3) Goal difference all league games; 4) Goals scored in league games
(Q) Qualified for the phase indicated

==== Northeastern Conference ====
Pos	Team	Pld	W	L	T	GF	GA	GD	Pts	PPG	Qualification
1	Sporting CT (Q)	10	9	1	0	37	10	+27	27	2.70	Conference Playoffs
2	Merrimack Valley Hawks FC	9	6	1	2	27	10	+17	20	2.22	
3	Rhode Island Rogues	10	4	3	3	23	15	+8	15	1.50	
4	New York Shockers	9	4	4	1	16	15	+1	13	1.44	
5	Albany Rush	10	2	6	2	15	20	−5	8	0.80	
6	Kingston Capitals	10	0	10	0	1	98	−97	0	0.00	

Updated to match(es) played on July 5, 2025. Source: WPSL standings
Rules for classification: 1) Head-to-head based on total points; 2) Total wins; 3) Goal difference all league games; 4) Goals scored in league games
(Q) Qualified for the phase indicated

=== South Region ===
==== Atlantic Conference ====
===== Carolinas Division =====
Pos	Team	Pld	W	L	T	GF	GA	GD	Pts	PPG	Qualification
1	Port City FC (Q)	7	6	0	1	22	4	+18	19	2.71	Division Playoffs
2	Carolina FC	8	4	2	2	13	9	+4	14	1.75	
3	Women's Football Club of Charlotte	8	4	3	1	17	12	+5	13	1.63	
4	NCFC	7	2	5	0	8	17	−9	6	0.86	
5	Soda City FC	8	1	7	0	4	22	−18	3	0.38	

Updated to match(es) played on July 2, 2025. Source: WPSL standings
Rules for classification: 1) Head-to-head based on total points; 2) Total wins; 3) Goal difference all league games; 4) Goals scored in league games
(Q) Qualified for the phase indicated

===== The District Division =====
Pos	Team	Pld	W	L	T	GF	GA	GD	Pts	PPG	Qualification
1	McLean Soccer (Q)	8	6	1	1	25	9	+16	19	2.38	Division Playoffs
2	Arlington Soccer Blue (Q)	8	4	3	1	13	13	0	13	1.63	Conference Playoffs
3	Arlington Soccer Red	8	3	3	2	16	14	+2	11	1.38	
4	U.K. FC	8	2	4	2	8	18	−10	8	1.00	
5	Alexandria Reds	8	2	6	0	8	28	−20	6	0.75	

Updated to match(es) played on June 29, 2025. Source: WPSL standings
Rules for classification: 1) Head-to-head based on total points; 2) Total wins; 3) Goal difference all league games; 4) Goals scored in league games
(Q) Qualified for the phase indicated

==== Gulf Coast Conference ====
===== Delta Basin Division =====
Pos	Team	Pld	W	L	T	GF	GA	GD	Pts	PPG	Qualification
1	LA Krew Rush (Q)	8	5	1	2	21	9	+12	17	2.13	Division Playoffs
2	Hattiesburg FC	8	4	2	2	22	16	+6	14	1.75	
3	Mississippi Blues SC	8	3	2	3	15	11	+4	12	1.50	
4	Shreveport United	8	3	5	0	16	28	−12	9	1.13	
5	Baton Rouge United	8	1	6	1	8	20	−12	4	0.50	

Updated to match(es) played on June 28, 2025. Source: WPSL standings
Rules for classification: 1) Head-to-head based on total points; 2) Total wins; 3) Goal difference all league games; 4) Goals scored in league games
(Q) Qualified for the phase indicated

===== Third Coast Division =====
Pos	Team	Pld	W	L	T	GF	GA	GD	Pts	PPG	Qualification
1	Pensacola FC (Q)	9	9	0	0	32	2	+30	27	3.00	Division Playoffs
2	Pensacola FC Academy	10	3	4	3	13	23	−10	12	1.20	
3	Union 10 FC	10	4	6	0	9	19	−10	12	1.20	
4	Gulf Coast United	10	3	5	2	13	21	−8	11	1.10	
5	Florida Roots	10	3	5	2	17	19	−2	11	1.10	
6	TLH Reckoning	9	3	5	1	13	16	−3	10	1.11	

Updated to match(es) played on May 31, 2025. Source: WPSL standings
Rules for classification: 1) Head-to-head based on total points; 2) Total wins; 3) Goal difference all league games; 4) Goals scored in league games
(Q) Qualified for the phase indicated

==== Southeast Conference ====
===== Pioneer Division =====
Pos	Team	Pld	W	L	T	GF	GA	GD	Pts	PPG	Qualification
1	865 Alliance	8	7	0	1	24	5	+19	22	2.75	
2	Nashville Rhythm F.C. (Q)	8	5	1	2	24	11	+13	17	2.13	Division Playoffs
3	FC Birmingham Women	8	1	6	1	11	41	−30	4	0.50	
4	TN Tempo FC	8	3	3	2	18	15	+3	11	1.38	
5	Jackson Ignite	8	0	6	2	6	36	−30	2	0.25	

Updated to match(es) played on June 29, 2025. Source: WPSL standings
Rules for classification: 1) Head-to-head based on total points; 2) Total wins; 3) Goal difference all league games; 4) Goals scored in league games
(Q) Qualified for the phase indicated

===== Peachtree Division =====
Pos	Team	Pld	W	L	T	GF	GA	GD	Pts	PPG	Qualification
1	Decatur FC	7	7	0	0	23	7	+16	21	3.00	
2	Chattanooga FC (Q)	7	5	1	1	18	5	+13	16	2.29	Division Playoffs
3	Georgia Impact	8	2	4	2	9	12	−3	8	1.00	
4	UFA Gunners	8	1	5	2	4	12	−8	5	0.63	
5	Atlanta Fire United	8	1	6	1	7	24	−17	4	0.50	

Updated to match(es) played on June 27, 2025. Source: WPSL standings
Rules for classification: 1) Head-to-head based on total points; 2) Total wins; 3) Goal difference all league games; 4) Goals scored in league games
(Q) Qualified for the phase indicated

==== Sunshine Conference ====
Pos	Team	Pld	W	L	T	GF	GA	GD	Pts	PPG
1	West Florida Flames	8	6	0	2	26	7	+19	20	2.50
2	Florida Premier FC	8	6	1	1	20	4	+16	19	2.38
3	Jacksonville Armada FC	8	6	1	1	28	8	+20	19	2.38
4	FC Prime	8	4	4	0	19	13	+6	12	1.50
5	Seminole Ice	7	3	4	0	14	16	−2	9	1.29
6	Florida Gulf Coast Dutch Lions	8	2	5	1	13	17	−4	7	0.88
7	Fusion FC	8	1	6	1	3	38	−35	4	0.50
8	AGC Football	7	0	7	0	2	43	−41	0	0.00

Updated to match(es) played on June 29, 2025. Source: WPSL standings
Rules for classification: 1) Head-to-head based on total points; 2) Total wins; 3) Goal difference all league games; 4) Goals scored in league games

=== West Region ===
==== Desert Conference ====
Pos	Team	Pld	W	L	T	GF	GA	GD	Pts	PPG	Qualification
1	Royals AZ	8	6	1	1	37	14	+23	19	2.38	
2	SC del Sol	8	6	2	0	33	15	+18	18	2.25	
3	Desert Dreams FC	8	5	3	0	26	19	+7	15	1.88	
4	FC Tucson	8	4	3	1	15	15	0	13	1.63	
5	El Paso Surf (Q)	8	3	5	0	15	23	−8	9	1.13	Conference Playoffs
6	Arizona Arsenal Soccer Club	8	3	5	0	12	15	−3	9	1.13	
7	PHX Heat FC	8	0	8	0	6	48	−42	0	0.00	

First match(es) will be played: July 5, 2025. Source: WPSL standings
Rules for classification: 1) Head-to-head based on total points; 2) Total wins; 3) Goal difference all league games; 4) Goals scored in league games
(Q) Qualified for the phase indicated

==== PAC Northwest Conference ====
Pos	Team	Pld	W	L	T	GF	GA	GD	Pts	PPG	Qualification
1	Portland Thorns FC II	8	8	0	0	21	2	+19	24	3.00	
2	Spokane Shadow (Q)	8	5	3	0	22	9	+13	15	1.88	Conference Playoffs
3	Westside Metros FC	8	3	4	1	8	9	−1	10	1.25	
4	Vancouver Victory FC	8	2	5	1	7	16	−9	7	0.88	
5	Seattle Reign FC II	8	1	7	0	4	31	−27	3	0.38	

Updated to match(es) played on June 29, 2025. Source: WPSL standings
Rules for classification: 1) Head-to-head based on total points; 2) Total wins; 3) Goal difference all league games; 4) Goals scored in league games
(Q) Qualified for the phase indicated

==== NorCal Conference ====
Pos	Team	Pld	W	L	T	GF	GA	GD	Pts	PPG	Qualification
1	California Storm (Q)	8	7	1	0	21	5	+16	21	2.63	Conference Playoffs
2	Fresno Freeze	8	5	2	1	12	8	+4	16	2.00	
3	FC Davis	8	4	2	2	22	3	+19	14	1.75	
4	Lamorinda United	8	4	3	1	12	2	+10	13	1.63	
5	San Ramon FC	8	3	4	1	9	17	−8	10	1.25	
6	San Francisco Nighthawks	8	2	3	3	15	13	+2	9	1.13	
7	Iron Rose FC	8	2	3	3	9	12	−3	9	1.13	
8	Napa Valley 1839 FC	8	3	5	0	16	20	−4	9	1.13	
9	San Francisco Elite Soccer Club	8	0	7	1	6	24	−18	1	0.13	

Updated to match(es) played on July 7, 2025. Source: WPSL standings
Rules for classification: 1) Head-to-head based on total points; 2) Total wins; 3) Goal difference all league games; 4) Goals scored in league games
(Q) Qualified for the phase indicated

==== So Cal Conference ====
Pos	Team	Pld	W	L	T	GF	GA	GD	Pts	PPG	Qualification
1	San Diego Don	10	7	1	2	27	18	+9	23	2.30	
2	So Cal Union FC (Q)	10	7	1	2	18	10	+8	23	2.30	Conference Playoffs
3	FC Premier Women	10	7	2	1	33	14	+19	22	2.20	
4	Beach Futbol Club	10	6	2	2	21	12	+9	20	2.00	
5	San Diego Strikers	10	6	3	1	23	15	+8	19	1.90	
6	Rebels Soccer Club	10	6	4	0	22	12	+10	18	1.80	
7	San Diego Parceiro Ladies	10	3	6	1	14	33	−19	10	1.00	
8	ALBION San Diego	10	3	6	1	12	20	−8	10	1.00	
9	Southern California Eagles	10	3	7	0	7	19	−12	9	0.90	
10	SoCal Dutch Lions FC	10	1	7	2	5	22	−17	5	0.50	
11	LA Surf Soccer Club	10	0	10	0	6	24	−18	0	0.00	

Updated to match(es) played on June 29, 2025. Source: WPSL standings
Rules for classification: 1) Head-to-head based on total points; 2) Total wins; 3) Goal difference all league games; 4) Goals scored in league games
(Q) Qualified for the phase indicated

== Playoffs ==
Conference play-offs July 2–3	Region Semifinals; July 12–13
CA	So Cal Union FC (Note: Region hosts)	3
WA	Spokane Shadow	2
West Region
CA	California Storm	7
TX	El Paso Surf	0
TN	Chattanooga FC	1
TN	Nashville Rhythm F.C.	0
TN	Chattanooga FC	3
Southeast Conference
VA	Arlington Soccer Blue	1
South Region
DC	McLean Soccer	3
NC	Port City	0
DC	McLean Soccer	1
Atlantic Conference; Gulf Cost Conference
LA	LA Krewe Rush	3
LA	LA Krewe Rush	2
FL	Pensecola FC	1
WI	FC Milwaukee Torrent	2(5)
MN	St. Croix Soccer Club	2(6)
MN	St. Croix Soccer Club	3
North Lakes Conference
MO	Union KC	1
Central Region
OK	Oklahoma City FC	3
MO	Lou Fusz Athletic	2
OK	Oklahoma City FC	3
Midwest Conference
TX	Austin Rise FC	0
NY	Niagara 1812	0
CT	Sporting CT	9
East Region
NY	Brooklyn City F.C.	2
Mid–Atlantic Conference
PA	PA Classics	3
NJ	SJEB	3
PA	PA Classics	5

Region finals July 13
CA	So Cal Union FC	0
CA	California Storm	2
TN	Chattanooga FC	4
LA	LA Krewe Rush	0
MN	St. Croix Soccer Club	2
OK	Oklahoma City FC	1
CT	Sporting CT	2
PA	PA Classics	1

National Semi–finals; July 18
CA	California Storm	1
TN	Chattanooga FC	0
CT	Sporting CT	4
MN	St. Croix Soccer Club	1

National Final; July 20; Stillwater, OK
CA	California Storm	0
CT	Sporting CT	4

== Awards ==
=== Team of the Week ===
Week	Conference	Club	Facts	Ref.
2	Great Lakes - Great River Division	Columbus Eagles FC	4-1 win over #2 ranked team	
3	Sunshine Conference	Jacksonville Armada FC	Earning 4–3 win with three goals in last 10 minutes	
4	Desert Conference	Royals AZ	Earning 5–3 win with four goals in stoppage time	
5	Mid-Atlantic Conference - Colonial Division	FC Monmouth	2 wins in the week	
6	Sunshine Conference	Florida Premier FC	2 wins in three games, one against the #7 team	
7	Northeastern Conference	Merrimack Valley Hawks FC	2–1 loss to #1 team in the league	
8	Mountain Conference – Rockies Division	Colorado Pride	Fairplay	

=== Player of the Week ===
Week	Offensive player	Club	Stats	Ref.
Week	Defensive player	Club	Stats	Ref.
2	(United States) Nikki Cox, MF	Columbus Eagles FC	Hat Trick	
2	(United States) Maddox Fergus, GK	Sunflower State FC	Clean sheet, 5 saves	
3	(United States) Davy Mokelke, FW	Salvo SC	Hat Trick	
3	(United States) Caroline Ritter, GK	Lou Fusz Athletic	11 Saves, 2 Clean sheets, 2 Wins	
4	(United States) Cherrie Cox, FW	FC Premier Women	2 Games, 4 Goals, 2 Assists	
4	(United States) Elizabeth Ludwig, GK	So Cal Union FC	Clean sheet, 12 saves	
5	(United States) Paige Seitz, MF	FC Monmouth	2 Games, 3 Goals, 1 Assists	
5	(United States) Sierra Sythe, DF	Beach Futbol Club	2 games, 180 minutes, 2 goals allowed	
6	(United States) Brooke Holden, FW	San Diego Dons	3 Games, 6 Goals	
6	(United States) Logan Maszton, DF	Desert Dreams F.C.	1 game, 1 goal, shutout victory	
7	(United States) Farrah Walters, FW	SC del Sol	2 Games, 6 Goals, 4 Assists	
7	(United States) Celeste Sloma, GK	Columbus Eagles FC	1 game, 6 saves, clean–sheet	
8	(United States) Mia Minestrella, FW	Beach Futbol Club	2 Games, 5 Goals, 3 Assists	
8	(United States) Remi Cherkas, DF	SJEB	2 game, 1 goal, 1 assist	

=== All-National team ===
First team
Goalkeeper	Defenders	Midfielders	Forwards
(United States) Abbie Faingold (California Storm)	(United States) Paloma Daubert (California Storm) (United States) Kylee McIntosh (Sporting CT)	(United States) Hannah Tillett (Chattanooga FC) (United States) Cara Jordan (Sporting CT)	(United States) Tiffany Weimer (Sporting CT) (United States) Reese McDermott (Chattanooga FC) (United States) Imani Jenkins (Sporting CT) (United States) Erica Grilione (United States) Brooke Nelson (St. Croix Legacy) (United States) Amara Smith (St. Croix Legacy)

=== All-Region teams ===
Central Region
Goalkeeper	Defenders	Midfielders	Forwards
(United States) Abbie Faingold (California Storm)	(United States) Paloma Daubert (California Storm) (United States) Kylee McIntosh (Sporting CT)	(United States) Hannah Tillett (Chattanooga FC) (United States) Cara Jordan (Sporting CT)	(United States) Tiffany Weimer (Sporting CT) (United States) Reese McDermott (Chattanooga FC) (United States) Imani Jenkins (Sporting CT) (United States) Erica Grilione (United States) Brooke Nelson (St. Croix Legacy) (United States) Amara Smith (St. Croix Legacy)

=== All-Conference Teams ===
- **Bold** denotes the Conference Players of the Year.

All-Conference Teams
Conference	Goalkeeper	Defenders	Midfielders	Forwards	Coach
West Region
Desert	**Erin Gibbs (Arizona Arsenal Soccer Club)**	Zoe Ballard (Arizona Arsenal Soccer Club); Shania Walters (FC Tucson); Kiki Smith (Royals AZ)	Luiza Travossos (FC Tucson); Jaime Black (FC Tucson); Sabrina Guzman (SC del Sol)	**Vivien Villarreal (FC Tucson)**; Tatum Thomason (SC del Sol); Tyra King (Arizona Arsenal Soccer Club); Mollie Baker (Royals AZ)	Mat Evans & Jared Bedard (SC del Sol)
Northwest	Mercedes Cullen (Spokane Shadow)	**Makayla Werner (Spokane Shadow)**; Kolo Suliafu (Seattle Reign FC II); Lucie Rokos (Portland Thorns FC II)	Livvy Moore (Spokane Shadow); Kyah Le (Spokane Shadow); Emilia Warta (Portland Thorns FC II)	**Merissa Garcia (Spokane Shadow)**; Cally Togaia (Portland Thorns FC II); Hailey Still (Seattle Reign FC II); Juju Harris (Seattle Reign FC II)	Drew Williams (Spokane Shadow)
Pac North	Abbie Faingold (California Storm)	**Elise Ziem (Lamorinda United)**; Amelia Villa (California Storm); Emma Scott (Iron Rose FC)	Alex Klos (California Storm); Mia Castillo (Lamorinda United); Karissa Ruble (Lamorinda United); Fatima Waldo Garcia (San Francisco Nighthawks)	**Camryn Lancaster (California Storm)**; Kim Garcia (Napa Valley 1839 FC); Sam Tristan (Iron Rose FC)	Zac Sullivan & Pip Harrigan (FC Davis)
So Cal - Coastal	**Zora Standifer (LA Surf Soccer Club)**	Kala McDaniel (MISS KICK FC); Ella Freebury (Beach Futbol Club); Skye Johnson (FC Premier Women); Liberty Ortiz (Southern California Eagles)	**Shannon Simon (Beach Futbol Club)**; Hope Paredes (MISS KICK FC); Kailey Park (FC Premier Women)	Megan Chelf (MISS KICK FC); Maile Hayes (Beach Futbol Club); Cherri Cox (FC Premier Women)	Aaron Rodriquez (FC Premier Women)
So Cal - Plymouth	Glo Hinojosa (Rebels Soccer Club)	**Edra Bello (San Diego Surf)**; Sarah Melcher (Rebels Soccer Club); Aleah Minnach (SoCal Dutch Lions FC)	Ines Derrien (San Diego Surf); Marissa LeVine (So Cal Union FC); Anya Van Den Einde (San Diego Surf)	**Brooke Miller (San Diego Surf)**; Kiera Bocchino (San Diego Strikers); Leah Kunde (ALBION San Diego); Morgan Witz (So Cal Union FC)	Rudy Canales (So Cal Union FC)
Central Region
Heartland	**Callie Sullivan (Oklahoma City FC)**	Addison Roberts (Oklahoma City FC); Reece Walrod (Union KC); Grace Winegar (Missouri Reign); Abby Small (Kansas City Courage II)	**Aya Saiki (Kansas City Courage II)**; Thayline Teixeira (Sunflower State FC); Courtney Claassen (Kansas City Courage II)	Kate Gibson (Union KC); Kaira Houser (Kansas City Courage II); Emma Rice (Oklahoma City FC)	Dan Naidu (Union KC)
Midwest - Gateway	**Abby Jenkins (FC Pride)**	Maddie Swingle (FC Pride); Ella Raimondi (FC Dayton); Carli Stinson (FC Dayton)	Summer Fishel (FC Pride); Gracie Dunaway (FC Pride); Leah Selm (Lou Fusz Athletic); Sarah Hiestand (Junction FC)	**Peyton Kohls (FC Dayton)**; Kayla Budish (FC Pride); Sarah Foley (Junction FC)	Kip McDaniel & Josh Stebbins (Junction FC)
Midwest - Lake Michigan	**Kate Hopma (Chicago House AC)**	Greta Hanson (FC Milwaukee Torrent); Ailyn Gallardo (Chicago House AC); Alyssa Mericle (Green Bay Glory)	Lainey Higgins (FC Milwaukee Torrent); McKayla Legois (Green Bay Glory); Maggie Schmidt (Chicago House AC); Madison Ferris (Chicago KICS Football Club)	**Josie Bieda (FC Milwaukee Torrent)**; Addison Stanciak (FC Milwaukee Torrent); Kayla Shebar (Chicago House AC)	Kerry Geocaris & Patrick Birder (Green Bay Glory)
Mountain - Rockies	Harlee Head (PSD Academy)	**Rachel Gerrie (Indios Denver FC)**; Sarah Dunn (Colorado Pride); Eva Bleam (PSD Academy)	Ava Amsden (Colorado Pride); Miriam Caberello (Indios Denver FC); Taylor Evans (PSD Academy)	**Bello (Colorado Pride)**; Cate Sheahan; Ariah Velasquez (Indios Denver FC); Abby Stassi (Colorado Pride)	Juan Martinez (Indios Denver FC)
Mountain - Wasatch	**Lauren Rodriguez (Utah Surf)**	Kylie Olsen (La Roca FC); Hope Munson (Utah Avalanche); Carlie Dare (Utah Surf)	Bella Devey (Utah Avalanche); Danika Serassio (Utah Surf); Emma Carver (Griffins FC)	**Seven Castain (Utah Avalanche)**; Hailey North (Griffins FC); Bizzy Arevalo (La Roca FC); Lily Boyden (La Roca FC)	Brad Silvey & Izzy Gines (Utah Surf)
Northern	**Cambell Fischer (Sioux Falls City FC)**	Jordan Tenpas (Sioux Falls City FC); Olivia Bohl (Minnesota Thunder); Jordan Jeffers (St. Croix Legacy)	Paige Kalal (Minnesota Thunder); Avery Murdzek (St. Croix Legacy); Molly Fiedler (Salvo SC)	Khyah Harper (Salvo SC); **Mia Mullenmeister (Sioux Falls City FC)**; Katharina Oelschlaeger (Sioux Falls City FC); Izzy Engle (Minnesota Thunder)	Joe DeMay (Sioux Falls City FC)
South Region
Atlantic - Carolinas	Blair Barefoot (Port City FC)	**Sallie Garner (Charlotte Eagles)**; Kaylee Risher (Port City FC); Joryn Hall (Port City FC)	Bri Myers (Charlotte Eagles); Ellie Farrell (Port City FC); Ava Myers (Charlotte Eagles)	**Corine Gregory (Port City FC)**; Meredith King (Charlotte Eagles); Katie Paulakonis (Trinity Fire); Zoei Kempf (Women's Football Club of Charlotte)	Chad Medcalfe (Port City FC)
Atlantic - The District	Phoebe Carber (Arlington Soccer)	**Savannah Taylor (UK F.C.)**; Amelia Warren (Washington Dutch Lions FC); Chesney Robinson (Arlington Soccer)	**Eliza Turner (McLean Soccer)**; Maddie Hurowitz (Alexandria Reds); Avery Hallum (Arlington Soccer)	Olivia Stafford (Arlington Soccer); Olivia Woodson (UK F.C.); Ava Nucci (UK F.C.); Jessica Robbert (Arlington Soccer)	George Hales (Arlington Soccer)
Lone Star	Peyton Urban (Austin Rise FC)	**Kameron Kloza (Classics Elite SA)**; Ryann Jergovich (Austin Rise FC); Miljana Smiljkovic (Houston Aces); Hali Hartman (SouthStar FC)	**Lily Erb (Austin Rise FC)**; Kendall Kloza (Classics Elite SA); Wakana Ose (Futbolera Select)	Mikayla Cunningham (Classics Elite SA); Hailey Sapinoro (Austin Rise FC); Taylor Jernigan (Classics Elite SA)	Tom Morrill & Owen Collie (Classics Elite SA)
Southeast	Cayden Norris (865 Alliance)	**Naomi Moleka (UFA Gunners)**; Lawson Renie (865 Alliance); Sylvie Keck (Nashville Rhythm F.C.)	**Alivia Stott (865 Alliance)**; Ashlyn Koutsos (UFA Gunners); Sachiko Gamo (Nashville Rhythm F.C.); Grace Eatz (Georgia Impact)	Jordynn Dudley (UFA Gunners); Alexis Washington (865 Alliance); Maddie Padelski (Nashville Rhythm F.C.)	Scott Davidson (Nashville Rhythm F.C.)
Sunshine	Acelya Aydogmus (Cape Coral Cyclones)	**Catarina Bastos (FC Prime)**; Savannah Larsen (West Florida Flames); D'Yolanda Pineda (Dade County Football Club)	Lola Ressler (Seminole Ice); Deborah Bien-Aime (FC Prime); Hayden Leplay (West Florida Flames)	**Emily Thompson (FC Prime)**; Jasmine Perez-Acosta (Cape Coral Cyclones); Mary Raymond (West Florida Flames); Ava Kooker (Seminole Ice)	Jaime McGuinness (West Florida Flames)
East Region
Great Lakes - Great River	Maddy Neundorfer (Beadling Soccer Club)	**Emma Rigone (Beadling Soccer Club)**; Ella Deevers (Ambassadors Cleveland); Norah Roush (Columbus Eagles FC)	Samantha Wiehe (Ambassadors Cleveland); Kelsey Salopek (Beadling Soccer Club); Rayann Pruss (Greater Toledo FC)	**Taylor Huff (Ambassadors Cleveland)**; Nikki Cox (Columbus Eagles FC); Taylor Hamlett (Ambassadors Cleveland); AAilyah Faddoul (Corktown WFC)	Caleb Fortune (Ambassadors Cleveland)
Great Lakes - Lake Erie	**Riley Morningstar (Erie FC)**	Madi Snyder (Cleveland Ambassadors); Thea Juul (Erie FC); Mia DiPasquale (Niagara 1812)	Ashley Townsend (Cleveland Ambassadors); Maia MacLean (Niagara 1812); Alina Garcia (Erie FC); Macy Hellwig (Niagara 1812)	**Margey Brown (Cleveland Ambassadors)**; Arianna Zumpano (Niagara 1812); Emily Marco (BC United)	Javier Iriart (Cleveland Ambassadors)
Metropolitan	**Annabelle Adams (New York Athletic Club)**	Brook Herber (SUSA FC); Claire Pinnie (Downtown United Soccer Club); Una McCorry (New York Athletic Club); Nicole Wilson (STA)	**Emily Riggins (SUSA FC)**; Syndey Masur (STA); Dylan Jovanovic (Downtown United Soccer Club)	Ashley Bell (SUSA FC); Monica Viveros (Downtown United Soccer Club); Jaiden Schultz (STA)	JR Balzarini (SUSA FC)
Mid-Atlantic - Colonial	Grace Keen (Delaware Ospreys)	**Sydni Wright (Delaware Ospreys)**; Eden Veenema (Penn Fusion SA); Allison Gilbert (Real Central NJ)	Ava Curtis (Real Central NJ); Adrianna Pepe (SJEB FC); Susanna Soderman (Penn Fusion SA); Ashlee Brentlinger (Delaware Ospreys)	**Bella Miller (Real Central NJ)**; Delaney Lappin (SJEB FC); Madison Shumate (Penn Fusion SA)	Brian Thomsen (Real Central NJ)
Mid-Atlantic - Commonwealth	Autum Monty (Reading United A.C.)	**Lauren Costello (Keystone FC)**; Emily Banashefski (Hex FC Tempest); Leah Buch (PA Classics)	**Jailene DeJesus (PA Classics)**; Ashley Lavrich (Reading United A.C.); Mia Libby (Keystone FC); Haleigh Wintersteen (Hex FC Tempest)	Courtney Andruczk (Keystone FC); Halle Engle (Keystone FC); Elizabeth Estrada (PA Classics)	Tom Gosselin (Reading United A.C.)
Northeastern	Maddie Bulens (Merrimack Valley Hawks FC)	**Maddy DeCola (Clarkstown Soccer Club)**; Emanuelley Ferreira (Merrimack Valley Hawks FC); Parker Roberts (Rhode Island Rogues); Stella Tapia (Clarkstown Soccer Club)	Ciera Lundy (New York Shockers); Ashley Moon (Clarkstown Soccer Club); Marissa Sage (Merrimack Valley Hawks FC)	**Kelly Brady (Clarkstown Soccer Club)**; Meredith McDermott (Merrimack Valley Hawks FC); Hannah McNulty (Rhode Island Rogues)	Danny Samimi (Clarkstown Soccer Club)

== Franchises of the Year ==
Region	Conference	Team	Ref.
West Region	Desert	SC del Sol	
West Region	Northwest	Spokane Shadow	
West Region	Pac North	California Storm	
West Region	So Cal - Coastal	MISS KICK FC	
West Region	So Cal - Plymouth	So Cal Union FC	
Central Region	Heartland	Oklahoma City FC	
Central Region	Midwest - Gateway	FC Pride	
Central Region	Midwest - Lake Michigan	Chicago House	
Central Region	Mountain - Rockies	Colorado Pride	
Central Region	Mountain - Wasatch	Utah Surf	
Central Region	Northern	Sioux Falls City FC	
South Region	Atlantic - Carolinas	Charlotte Eagles	
South Region	Atlantic - The District	Arlington Soccer	
South Region	Lone Star	Austin Rise FC	
South Region	Southeast	Decatur FC	
South Region	Sunshine	AGC Football	
East Region	Great Lakes - Great Rivers	Columbus Eagles FC	
East Region	Great Lakes - Lake Erie	Cleveland Ambassadors	
East Region	Metropolitan	STA	
East Region	Mid-Atlantic - Colonial	Real Central NJ	
East Region	Mid-Atlantic - Commonwealth	Reading United A.C.	
East Region	Northeastern	Clarkstown Soccer Club	
