= 2015 Real Salt Lake Women season =

Real Salt Lake Women
2015 season
- Owner: Dell Loy Hansen
- Coach: Jeff Ginn
- Stadium: Ute Field
- Women's Premier Soccer League: Conference: 3rd
- WPSL Playoffs: TBD
Home colors	Away colors

The 2015 Real Salt Lake Women season was the team's fourth year of existence in its current incarnation and their ninth consecutive season in the Women's Premier Soccer League, the second division of the American soccer pyramid.

== Competitions ==
=== WPSL regular season ===
==== Results summary ====
Overall								Home						Away					
Pld	Pts	W	L	T	GF	GA	GD	W	L	T	GF	GA	GD	W	L	T	GF	GA	GD
9	19	6	2	1	29	11	+18	3	0	0	18	3	+15	3	2	1	11	8	+3

Last updated: July 6, 2015
Pld = Matches played; Pts = Points; W = Matches won; T = Matches tied; L = Matches lost; GF = Goals for; GA = Goals against; GD = Goal difference

==== Results by round ====
Round	1	2	3	4	5	6	7	8	9	10	11	12	13	14	15	16
Stadium	A	A	A	A	H	H	A	A	H	H	H	A				
Result	L	W	W	L	W	D	W	W	L							
Big Sky	9	5	5	5	4	3	2									

Updated to match(es) played on July 10, 2015. Source: wpsl.info
A = Away; H = Home; W = Win; D = Draw; L = Loss

==== Match results ====
As of July 10, 2015

May 29, 2015 1	Houston Aces	2–1	Real Salt Lake Women	Houston, TX
7:30 p.m. CDT	Payetta 68'; Payetta 70'		Sharp 27'	Stadium: Houston Sports Park; Attendance: n/a Referee: n/a

May 31, 2015 2	Texas Titans	1 - 2	Real Salt Lake Women	Houston, TX
2:00 p.m. CDT			Sharp 5'; Vanderveur 22'	Stadium: San Jacinto College; Attendance: n/a Referee: n/a

June 12, 2015 3	FC Tulsa Spirit	1 - 3	Real Salt Lake Women	Broken Arrow, OK
5:00 p.m. CDT	20'		Smith 12'; Viernes 40' 71'	Stadium: Union 8th Grade Center

June 14, 2015 4	Oklahoma City FC	2 - 0	Real Salt Lake Women	Oklahoma City, OK
2:00 p.m. CDT	25'; 39'			Stadium: Casady School

June 19, 2015 5	Real Salt Lake Women	11 - 0	Texas Spurs FC	Salt Lake City, UT
7:30 p.m. MDT	Smith 1', 20', 61'; Viernes 13'; Crump 46', 56'; Ritchie 50' (pen.); Swensen 74'; Tebbs 77'; Grainger 81'; Bair 82'			Stadium: Ute Field

June 21, 2015 6	Real Salt Lake Women	v	Fort Worth Panthers	Salt Lake City, UT
7:30 p.m. MDT	Olave (yellow card) 41' (yellow-red card) 89'; Saucedo (red card) 76'; Beckerman (yellow card) 95+'		Teibert (yellow card) 6'; Mattocks 80'; Adekugbe (yellow card) 83'	Stadium: Ute Field

June 26, 2015 7	Texas Spurs FC	1 - 1	Real Salt Lake Women	Dallas, TX
7:30 p.m. EDT	Djahanbani		Parry

June 28, 2015 8	Fort Worth Panthers	1 - 4	Real Salt Lake Women	Fort Worth, TX
8:00 p.m. MDT	pen.'		Moberly; Smith; Hawkins

July 1, 2015 9	Real Salt Lake Women	5 - 2	Texas Titans	Salt Lake City, UT
7:30 p.m. MDT	Smith; Green; Swensen; Bair		Goal	Stadium: Ute Field

July 3, 2015 10	Real Salt Lake Women	2 - 1	Oklahoma City FC	Salt Lake City, UT
7:30 p.m. MDT				Stadium: Ute Field

July 5, 2015 11	Real Salt Lake Women	v	FC Tulsa Spirit	Salt Lake City, UT
2:00 p.m. CDT		[]		Stadium: Ute Field; Referee: Drew Fischer

July 9, 2015 12	Real Salt Lake Women	1 - 2	Houston Aces	Salt Lake City, UT
4:00 p.m. EDT	Smith 31'	[]	Payetta 14'; Payetta 68'	Stadium: Ute Field

July 11, 2015 13	Austin Aces	v	Real Salt Lake Women	Austin, TX
8:00 p.m. MDT		[]

== Club ==
=== Roster ===
As of June 14, 2015.

No.	Position	Player
1	GK	Becca Ritchie
3	FW	Aurora Moberly
5	DF	Maddy Grainger
6	MF	Kira Sharp
8	FW	Alyssa Amano
10	MF	Annie Hawkins (C)
12	DF	Alyssa Lowry
13	FW	Brittney Krump
14	DF	Jenny Chiu
16	DF	Carla Remigi
17	DF	Roxy Tebbs
18	FW	Jeni Viernes
22	FW	Collette Smith (C)
