= 2024 WPSL season =

Women's Premier Soccer League
- Season: 2024
- Dates: May 10 – July 21
- Champion: California Storm
- Matches: 614
- Goals: 2,335 (3.8 per match)
- Best Player: Camryn Lancaster (California Storm)
- Top goalscorer: Khyah Harper (Salvo SC)
- Biggest home win: Colorado Pride 13–0 Colorado Blizzard FC (5/25); Royals AZ 14–1 El Paso Surf (6/28)
- Biggest away win: Colorado Blizzard FC 1–12 Colorado Pride (7/2)
- Highest scoring: Royals AZ 14–1 El Paso Surf (6/28)
- Longest winning run: Sioux Falls City FC & Charlotte Lady Eagles (9 wins)
- Longest unbeaten run: Charlotte Lady Eagles (12 games)
- Longest losing run: San Antonio Runners (10 games)
- All statistics correct as of 13:45, April 8, 2025 (UTC).

The 2024 Women's Premier Soccer League season is the 26th season of the WPSL. This season the WPSL will consist of 142 teams across 16 conferences, throughout 32 states, including 41 expansion teams.

== Team changes ==
=== New teams ===
- AGC Football
- Alexandria Reds
- BC United
- Beach Futbol Club
- Chicago House AC
- Corktown WFC
- Dade County Football Club
- Decatur FC
- Futbolera Select
- Greater Toledo FC
- Iron Rose FC
- Jacksonville Armada FC
- Junction FC
- Keystone FC
- McLean Soccer
- Merrimack Valley Hawks FC
- Niagara 1812
- Northern Utah United
- Port City FC
- Portland Thorns FC II
- PSD Academy
- Rebels Soccer Club
- RSL Southern Arizona
- San Antonio Runners
- Seattle Reign FC II
- Side FC 92
- Southern California Eagles
- Trinity Fire
- UFA Gunners
- UK F.C.
- Vancouver Victory FC
- West-Mont United

=== Departing Teams ===
- AFC Columbia (Missouri) (Merged with Missouri Reign)
- AHFC Royals (Texas)
- Bat Country FC (Texas)
- Boulder County United (Colorado)
- Challenge Red Devils (Texas)
- Colorado Rapids Women (Colorado)
- Corinthians FC of San Antonio (Texas)
- Cultures United Football Club (Washington)
- Diablo Valley Wolves (California)
- Elite Development Academy (California)
- FC Surge (Florida)
- Flatirons Rush SC (Colorado)
- Florida Krush (Florida)
- Houston Aces (Texas)
- Iowa Raptors FC (Iowa)
- Kingston Capitals (New York)
- FC Lehigh Valley Lady Sonic (Pennsylvania)
- Lonestar SC (Texas)
- ODFC Cesena
- OSA XF (Washington)
- San Antonio Blossoms (Texas)
- St. Louis Scott Gallagher Elite (Missouri)
- SoCal Reds FC (California)
- Soda City FC (South Carolina)
- Team Boca Blast (Florida)
- Torch FC (Pennsylvania)
- Tulsa Soccer Club (Oklahoma)
- United Soccer Alliance (Florida)

== Standings ==
=== Central Region ===
==== Heartland Conference ====
| Pos | Team | Pld | W | L | T | GF | GA | GD | Pts | PPG | Qualification |
|---|---|---|---|---|---|---|---|---|---|---|---|
| 1 | Union KC (Q) | 10 | 8 | 1 | 1 | 23 | 9 | +14 | 25 | 2.50 | Conference Playoffs |
| 2 | Kansas City Courage II | 10 | 6 | 2 | 2 | 24 | 10 | +14 | 20 | 2.00 | |
| 3 | Oklahoma City FC | 10 | 5 | 1 | 4 | 21 | 11 | +10 | 19 | 1.90 | |
| 4 | Sunflower State FC | 10 | 4 | 3 | 3 | 22 | 20 | +2 | 15 | 1.50 | |
| 5 | FC Wichita | 10 | 4 | 6 | 0 | 15 | 17 | −2 | 12 | 1.20 | |
| 6 | Missouri Reign | 10 | 1 | 7 | 2 | 7 | 18 | −11 | 5 | 0.50 | |
| 7 | Side FC 92 | 10 | 1 | 9 | 0 | 5 | 34 | −29 | 3 | 0.30 | |

Source: WPSL standings
Rules for classification: 1) Head-to-head based on total points; 2) Total wins; 3) Goal difference all league games; 4) Goals scored in league games
(Q) Qualified for the phase indicated

==== Midwest Conference ====
===== Gateway Division =====
| Pos | Team | Pld | W | L | T | GF | GA | GD | Pts | PPG | Qualification |
|---|---|---|---|---|---|---|---|---|---|---|---|
| 1 | FC Dayton | 10 | 9 | 0 | 1 | 30 | 5 | +25 | 28 | 2.80 | |
| 2 | Junction FC | 10 | 5 | 2 | 3 | 19 | 11 | +8 | 18 | 1.80 | |
| 3 | FC Pride (Q) | 10 | 5 | 4 | 1 | 26 | 10 | +16 | 16 | 1.60 | Division Playoffs |
| 4 | Lou Fusz Athletic | 10 | 5 | 4 | 1 | 21 | 14 | +7 | 16 | 1.60 | |
| 5 | Dayton Dutch Lions WFC | 10 | 1 | 8 | 1 | 2 | 31 | −29 | 4 | 0.40 | |
| 6 | FC Spirit | 10 | 1 | 8 | 1 | 5 | 41 | −36 | 4 | 0.40 | |

Source: WPSL standings
Rules for classification: 1) Head-to-head based on total points; 2) Total wins; 3) Goal difference all league games; 4) Goals scored in league games
(Q) Qualified for the phase indicated

===== Lake Michigan Division =====
| Pos | Team | Pld | W | L | T | GF | GA | GD | Pts | PPG | Qualification |
|---|---|---|---|---|---|---|---|---|---|---|---|
| 1 | FC Milwaukee Torrent (Q) | 8 | 8 | 0 | 0 | 31 | 3 | +28 | 24 | 3.00 | Division Playoffs |
| 2 | Green Bay Glory | 8 | 5 | 3 | 0 | 15 | 9 | +6 | 15 | 1.88 | |
| 3 | Chicago KICS Football Club | 8 | 3 | 3 | 2 | 14 | 13 | +1 | 11 | 1.38 | |
| 4 | Chicago House AC | 8 | 2 | 5 | 1 | 8 | 21 | −13 | 7 | 0.88 | |
| 5 | Quad Cities Rush | 8 | 0 | 7 | 1 | 2 | 30 | −28 | 1 | 0.13 | |

Source: WPSL standings
Rules for classification: 1) Head-to-head based on total points; 2) Total wins; 3) Goal difference all league games; 4) Goals scored in league games
(Q) Qualified for the phase indicated

==== Mountain Conference ====
===== Rockies Division =====
| Pos | Team | Pld | W | L | T | GF | GA | GD | Pts | PPG | Qualification |
|---|---|---|---|---|---|---|---|---|---|---|---|
| 1 | Colorado Pride (Q) | 8 | 7 | 1 | 0 | 38 | 4 | +34 | 21 | 2.63 | Division Playoffs |
| 2 | PSD Academy | 8 | 5 | 2 | 1 | 22 | 10 | +12 | 16 | 2.00 | |
| 3 | Indios Denver FC | 8 | 5 | 2 | 1 | 14 | 10 | +4 | 16 | 2.00 | |
| 4 | Broomfield Burn | 8 | 2 | 6 | 0 | 7 | 21 | −14 | 6 | 0.75 | |
| 5 | Colorado Blizzard FC | 8 | 0 | 8 | 0 | 4 | 55 | −51 | 0 | 0.00 | |

Source: WPSL standings
Rules for classification: 1) Head-to-head based on total points; 2) Total wins; 3) Goal difference all league games; 4) Goals scored in league games
(Q) Qualified for the phase indicated

===== Wasatch Division =====
| Pos | Team | Pld | W | L | T | GF | GA | GD | Pts | PPG |
|---|---|---|---|---|---|---|---|---|---|---|
| 1 | Utah Surf | 10 | 8 | 1 | 1 | 34 | 9 | +25 | 25 | 2.50 |
| 2 | La Roca FC | 10 | 6 | 1 | 3 | 35 | 17 | +18 | 21 | 2.10 |
| 3 | Utah Avalanche | 10 | 6 | 2 | 2 | 32 | 21 | +11 | 20 | 2.00 |
| 4 | Griffins FC | 10 | 3 | 6 | 1 | 12 | 25 | −13 | 10 | 1.00 |
| 5 | Utah Red Devils | 10 | 2 | 7 | 1 | 16 | 33 | −17 | 7 | 0.70 |
| 6 | Northern Utah United | 10 | 1 | 9 | 0 | 7 | 39 | −32 | 3 | 0.30 |

Source: WPSL standings
Rules for classification: 1) Head-to-head based on total points; 2) Total wins; 3) Goal difference all league games; 4) Goals scored in league games

==== Northern Conference ====
| Pos | Team | Pld | W | L | T | GF | GA | GD | Pts | PPG | Qualification |
|---|---|---|---|---|---|---|---|---|---|---|---|
| 1 | Sioux Falls City FC (Q) | 9 | 9 | 0 | 0 | 32 | 1 | +31 | 27 | 3.00 | Conference Playoffs |
| 2 | Salvo SC | 9 | 8 | 1 | 0 | 28 | 2 | +26 | 24 | 2.67 | |
| 3 | Minnesota Thunder | 9 | 6 | 3 | 0 | 29 | 8 | +21 | 18 | 2.00 | |
| 4 | Mankato United Soccer Club | 9 | 5 | 4 | 0 | 15 | 14 | +1 | 15 | 1.67 | |
| 5 | St. Croix Legacy | 8 | 4 | 3 | 1 | 11 | 10 | +1 | 13 | 1.63 | |
| 6 | Joy AC | 9 | 3 | 5 | 1 | 13 | 17 | −4 | 10 | 1.11 | |
| 7 | Rochester United FC | 9 | 3 | 5 | 1 | 14 | 30 | −16 | 10 | 1.11 | |
| 8 | MapleBrook Fury | 9 | 2 | 5 | 2 | 12 | 18 | −6 | 8 | 0.89 | |
| 9 | Dakota Fusion FC | 9 | 1 | 8 | 0 | 3 | 41 | −38 | 3 | 0.33 | |
| 10 | Manitou F.C. | 9 | 0 | 8 | 1 | 4 | 39 | −35 | 1 | 0.11 | |

Source: WPSL standings
Rules for classification: 1) Head-to-head based on total points; 2) Total wins; 3) Goal difference all league games; 4) Goals scored in league games
(Q) Qualified for the phase indicated

=== East Region ===
==== Great Lakes Conference ====
===== Great River Division =====
| Pos | Team | Pld | W | L | T | GF | GA | GD | Pts | PPG |
|---|---|---|---|---|---|---|---|---|---|---|
| 1 | Ambassadors Cleveland | 8 | 7 | 0 | 1 | 25 | 9 | +16 | 22 | 2.75 |
| 2 | Columbus Eagles FC | 8 | 5 | 1 | 2 | 22 | 12 | +10 | 17 | 2.13 |
| 3 | Beadling Soccer Club | 8 | 3 | 4 | 1 | 9 | 15 | −6 | 10 | 1.25 |
| 4 | Corktown WFC | 8 | 1 | 5 | 2 | 14 | 19 | −5 | 5 | 0.63 |
| 5 | Greater Toledo FC | 8 | 1 | 7 | 0 | 6 | 21 | −15 | 3 | 0.38 |

Source: WPSL standings
Rules for classification: 1) Head-to-head based on total points; 2) Total wins; 3) Goal difference all league games; 4) Goals scored in league games

===== Lake Erie Division =====
| Pos | Team | Pld | W | L | T | GF | GA | GD | Pts | PPG | Qualification |
|---|---|---|---|---|---|---|---|---|---|---|---|
| 1 | Niagara 1812 (Q) | 8 | 4 | 2 | 2 | 13 | 8 | +5 | 14 | 1.75 | Division Playoffs |
| 2 | RNY FC | 8 | 4 | 2 | 2 | 7 | 10 | −3 | 14 | 1.75 | |
| 3 | Cleveland Ambassadors | 8 | 4 | 4 | 0 | 21 | 11 | +10 | 12 | 1.50 | |
| 4 | BC United | 7 | 3 | 3 | 1 | 11 | 9 | +2 | 10 | 1.43 | |
| 5 | Erie FC | 7 | 1 | 5 | 1 | 2 | 18 | −16 | 4 | 0.57 | |

Source: WPSL standings
Rules for classification: 1) Head-to-head based on total points; 2) Total wins; 3) Goal difference all league games; 4) Goals scored in league games
(Q) Qualified for the phase indicated

==== Metropolitan Conference ====
| Pos | Team | Pld | W | L | T | GF | GA | GD | Pts | PPG | Qualification |
|---|---|---|---|---|---|---|---|---|---|---|---|
| 1 | SUSA FC (Q) | 8 | 7 | 1 | 0 | 23 | 7 | +16 | 21 | 2.63 | Conference Playoffs |
| 2 | Downtown United Soccer Club | 8 | 6 | 1 | 1 | 24 | 4 | +20 | 19 | 2.38 | |
| 3 | STA | 8 | 6 | 1 | 1 | 18 | 7 | +11 | 19 | 2.38 | |
| 4 | New York Athletic Club | 8 | 3 | 4 | 1 | 13 | 14 | −1 | 10 | 1.25 | |
| 5 | Brooklyn City F.C. | 8 | 3 | 4 | 1 | 6 | 11 | −5 | 10 | 1.25 | |
| 6 | NJ Wizards SC | 7 | 0 | 7 | 0 | 7 | 29 | −22 | 0 | 0.00 | |
| 7 | New York Dutch Lions FC | 7 | 0 | 7 | 0 | 3 | 29 | −26 | 0 | 0.00 | |

Source: WPSL standings
Rules for classification: 1) Head-to-head based on total points; 2) Total wins; 3) Goal difference all league games; 4) Goals scored in league games
(Q) Qualified for the phase indicated

==== Mid-Atlantic Conference ====
===== Colonial Division =====
| Pos | Team | Pld | W | L | T | GF | GA | GD | Pts | PPG | Qualification |
|---|---|---|---|---|---|---|---|---|---|---|---|
| 1 | Penn Fusion SA | 10 | 6 | 1 | 3 | 30 | 16 | +14 | 21 | 2.10 | |
| 2 | SJEB FC (Q) | 10 | 5 | 2 | 3 | 15 | 16 | −1 | 18 | 1.80 | Division Playoffs |
| 3 | Real Central NJ | 10 | 5 | 4 | 1 | 25 | 14 | +11 | 16 | 1.60 | |
| 4 | Delaware Ospreys | 9 | 5 | 3 | 1 | 24 | 14 | +10 | 16 | 1.78 | |
| 5 | Philadelphia Ukrainian Nationals - Liberty | 9 | 3 | 5 | 1 | 14 | 20 | −6 | 10 | 1.11 | |
| 6 | Fever SC | 10 | 2 | 6 | 2 | 9 | 19 | −10 | 8 | 0.80 | |
| 7 | West-Mont United | 9 | 1 | 7 | 1 | 10 | 38 | −28 | 4 | 0.44 | |

Source: WPSL standings
Rules for classification: 1) Head-to-head based on total points; 2) Total wins; 3) Goal difference all league games; 4) Goals scored in league games
(Q) Qualified for the phase indicated

===== Commonwealth Division =====
| Pos | Team | Pld | W | L | T | GF | GA | GD | Pts | PPG | Qualification |
|---|---|---|---|---|---|---|---|---|---|---|---|
| 1 | Keystone FC | 10 | 8 | 2 | 0 | 31 | 9 | +22 | 24 | 2.40 | |
| 2 | Reading United A.C. (Q) | 10 | 6 | 2 | 2 | 25 | 14 | +11 | 20 | 2.00 | Division Playoffs |
| 3 | PA Classics | 10 | 6 | 3 | 1 | 25 | 16 | +9 | 19 | 1.90 | |
| 4 | Hex FC Tempest | 10 | 6 | 4 | 0 | 21 | 16 | +5 | 18 | 1.80 | |
| 5 | Hershey FC | 10 | 1 | 8 | 1 | 7 | 29 | −22 | 4 | 0.40 | |
| 6 | LVU Rush | 10 | 0 | 8 | 2 | 5 | 31 | −26 | 2 | 0.20 | |

Source: WPSL standings
Rules for classification: 1) Head-to-head based on total points; 2) Total wins; 3) Goal difference all league games; 4) Goals scored in league games
(Q) Qualified for the phase indicated

==== Northeastern Conference ====
| Pos | Team | Pld | W | L | T | GF | GA | GD | Pts | PPG | Qualification |
|---|---|---|---|---|---|---|---|---|---|---|---|
| 1 | Clarkstown Soccer Club (Q) | 8 | 8 | 0 | 0 | 27 | 5 | +22 | 24 | 3.00 | Conference Playoffs |
| 2 | Rhode Island Rogues | 8 | 5 | 2 | 1 | 28 | 13 | +15 | 16 | 2.00 | |
| 3 | Merrimack Valley Hawks FC | 8 | 3 | 4 | 1 | 13 | 19 | −6 | 10 | 1.25 | |
| 4 | New York Shockers | 8 | 1 | 6 | 1 | 12 | 27 | −15 | 4 | 0.50 | |
| 5 | Force FC New York | 8 | 1 | 6 | 1 | 5 | 23 | −18 | 4 | 0.50 | |

Source: WPSL standings
Rules for classification: 1) Head-to-head based on total points; 2) Total wins; 3) Goal difference all league games; 4) Goals scored in league games
(Q) Qualified for the phase indicated

=== South Region ===
==== Atlantic Conference ====
===== Carolinas Division =====
| Pos | Team | Pld | W | L | T | GF | GA | GD | Pts | PPG | Qualification |
|---|---|---|---|---|---|---|---|---|---|---|---|
| 1 | Charlotte Eagles (Q) | 8 | 7 | 1 | 0 | 23 | 4 | +19 | 21 | 2.63 | Division Playoffs |
| 2 | Port City FC | 8 | 6 | 2 | 0 | 17 | 7 | +10 | 18 | 2.25 | |
| 3 | Women's Football Club of Charlotte | 8 | 4 | 4 | 0 | 15 | 12 | +3 | 12 | 1.50 | |
| 4 | Trinity Fire | 8 | 2 | 6 | 0 | 5 | 21 | −16 | 6 | 0.75 | |
| 5 | Neuse River Futbol Alliance | 8 | 1 | 7 | 0 | 5 | 26 | −21 | 3 | 0.38 | |

Source: WPSL standings
Rules for classification: 1) Head-to-head based on total points; 2) Total wins; 3) Goal difference all league games; 4) Goals scored in league games
(Q) Qualified for the phase indicated

===== The District Division =====
| Pos | Team | Pld | W | L | T | GF | GA | GD | Pts | PPG | Qualification |
|---|---|---|---|---|---|---|---|---|---|---|---|
| 1 | Arlington Soccer (Q) | 8 | 7 | 0 | 1 | 29 | 4 | +25 | 22 | 2.75 | Division Playoffs |
| 2 | McLean Soccer | 8 | 6 | 1 | 1 | 30 | 12 | +18 | 19 | 2.38 | |
| 3 | U.K. FC | 8 | 4 | 4 | 0 | 19 | 23 | −4 | 12 | 1.50 | |
| 4 | Alexandria Reds | 8 | 1 | 6 | 1 | 13 | 24 | −11 | 4 | 0.50 | |
| 5 | Washington Dutch Lions FC | 8 | 0 | 7 | 1 | 7 | 36 | −29 | 1 | 0.13 | |

Source: WPSL standings
Rules for classification: 1) Head-to-head based on total points; 2) Total wins; 3) Goal difference all league games; 4) Goals scored in league games
(Q) Qualified for the phase indicated

==== Lone Star Conference ====
| Pos | Team | Pld | W | L | T | GF | GA | GD | Pts | PPG | Qualification |
|---|---|---|---|---|---|---|---|---|---|---|---|
| 1 | Austin Rise FC (Q) | 10 | 6 | 1 | 3 | 23 | 9 | +14 | 21 | 2.10 | Conference Playoffs |
| 2 | Classics Elite SA | 10 | 5 | 1 | 4 | 24 | 13 | +11 | 19 | 1.90 | |
| 3 | Futbolera Select | 10 | 4 | 3 | 3 | 23 | 14 | +9 | 15 | 1.50 | |
| 4 | Houston Aces | 10 | 4 | 3 | 3 | 20 | 12 | +8 | 15 | 1.50 | |
| 5 | SouthStar FC | 10 | 3 | 4 | 3 | 19 | 16 | +3 | 12 | 1.20 | |
| 6 | San Antonio Runners | 10 | 0 | 10 | 0 | 0 | 64 | −64 | 0 | 0.00 | |

Source: WPSL standings
Rules for classification: 1) Head-to-head based on total points; 2) Total wins; 3) Goal difference all league games; 4) Goals scored in league games
(Q) Qualified for the phase indicated

==== Southeast Conference ====
| Pos | Team | Pld | W | L | T | GF | GA | GD | Pts | PPG |
|---|---|---|---|---|---|---|---|---|---|---|
| 1 | 865 Alliance | 8 | 6 | 0 | 2 | 26 | 7 | +19 | 20 | 2.50 |
| 2 | Decatur FC | 8 | 6 | 1 | 1 | 23 | 3 | +20 | 19 | 2.38 |
| 3 | UFA Gunners | 8 | 5 | 1 | 2 | 27 | 7 | +20 | 17 | 2.13 |
| 4 | Nashville Rhythm F.C. | 8 | 5 | 2 | 1 | 22 | 9 | +13 | 16 | 2.00 |
| 5 | Georgia Impact | 8 | 4 | 2 | 2 | 12 | 8 | +4 | 14 | 1.75 |
| 6 | Chattanooga FC | 8 | 3 | 5 | 0 | 19 | 26 | −7 | 9 | 1.13 |
| 7 | Atlanta Fire United | 8 | 2 | 6 | 0 | 10 | 28 | −18 | 6 | 0.75 |
| 8 | FC Birmingham Women | 8 | 1 | 7 | 0 | 5 | 41 | −36 | 3 | 0.38 |
| 9 | FC Nashville Wolves | 8 | 0 | 8 | 0 | 2 | 51 | −49 | 0 | 0.00 |

Source: WPSL standings
Rules for classification: 1) Head-to-head based on total points; 2) Total wins; 3) Goal difference all league games; 4) Goals scored in league games

==== Sunshine Conference ====
| Pos | Team | Pld | W | L | T | GF | GA | GD | Pts | PPG | Qualification |
|---|---|---|---|---|---|---|---|---|---|---|---|
| 1 | West Florida Flames | 8 | 5 | 0 | 3 | 19 | 4 | +15 | 18 | 2.25 | |
| 2 | FC Prime (Q) | 8 | 5 | 2 | 1 | 16 | 8 | +8 | 16 | 2.00 | Conference Playoffs |
| 3 | Seminole Ice | 8 | 5 | 2 | 1 | 21 | 14 | +7 | 16 | 2.00 | |
| 4 | Cape Coral Cyclones | 8 | 5 | 3 | 0 | 16 | 10 | +6 | 15 | 1.88 | |
| 5 | Jacksonville Armada FC | 8 | 4 | 2 | 2 | 16 | 5 | +11 | 14 | 1.75 | |
| 6 | Dade County Football Club | 7 | 2 | 3 | 2 | 11 | 11 | 0 | 8 | 1.14 | |
| 7 | Florida Gulf Coast Dutch Lions FC | 7 | 2 | 5 | 0 | 11 | 18 | −7 | 6 | 0.86 | |
| 8 | Fusion FC | 8 | 1 | 6 | 1 | 5 | 33 | −28 | 4 | 0.50 | |
| 9 | AGC Football | 8 | 1 | 7 | 0 | 9 | 23 | −14 | 3 | 0.38 | |

Source: WPSL standings
Rules for classification: 1) Head-to-head based on total points; 2) Total wins; 3) Goal difference all league games; 4) Goals scored in league games
(Q) Qualified for the phase indicated

=== West Region ===
==== Desert Conference ====
| Pos | Team | Pld | W | L | T | GF | GA | GD | Pts | PPG |
|---|---|---|---|---|---|---|---|---|---|---|
| 1 | SC del Sol | 10 | 9 | 0 | 1 | 34 | 7 | +27 | 28 | 2.80 |
| 2 | FC Tucson | 10 | 5 | 2 | 3 | 25 | 11 | +14 | 18 | 1.80 |
| 3 | Arizona Arsenal Soccer Club | 10 | 4 | 3 | 3 | 26 | 18 | +8 | 15 | 1.50 |
| 4 | Royals AZ | 10 | 4 | 4 | 2 | 23 | 12 | +11 | 14 | 1.40 |
| 5 | El Paso Surf | 10 | 2 | 6 | 2 | 11 | 52 | −41 | 8 | 0.80 |
| 6 | RSL Southern Arizona | 10 | 0 | 9 | 1 | 4 | 62 | −58 | 1 | 0.10 |

Source: WPSL standings
Rules for classification: 1) Head-to-head based on total points; 2) Total wins; 3) Goal difference all league games; 4) Goals scored in league games

==== Northwest Conference ====
| Pos | Team | Pld | W | L | T | GF | GA | GD | Pts | PPG | Qualification |
|---|---|---|---|---|---|---|---|---|---|---|---|
| 1 | Spokane Shadow (Q) | 8 | 6 | 1 | 1 | 28 | 11 | +17 | 19 | 2.38 | Conference Playoffs |
| 2 | Portland Thorns FC II | 8 | 4 | 2 | 2 | 21 | 13 | +8 | 14 | 1.75 | |
| 3 | Seattle Reign FC II | 8 | 4 | 3 | 1 | 17 | 12 | +5 | 13 | 1.63 | |
| 4 | Westside Metros FC | 8 | 2 | 3 | 3 | 6 | 14 | −8 | 9 | 1.13 | |
| 5 | Vancouver Victory FC | 8 | 0 | 7 | 1 | 2 | 32 | −30 | 1 | 0.13 | |

Source: WPSL standings
Rules for classification: 1) Head-to-head based on total points; 2) Total wins; 3) Goal difference all league games; 4) Goals scored in league games
(Q) Qualified for the phase indicated

==== Pac North Conference ====
| Pos | Team | Pld | W | L | T | GF | GA | GD | Pts | PPG | Qualification |
|---|---|---|---|---|---|---|---|---|---|---|---|
| 1 | California Storm (Q) | 9 | 6 | 0 | 3 | 24 | 6 | +18 | 21 | 2.33 | Conference Playoffs |
| 2 | FC Davis | 9 | 6 | 0 | 3 | 30 | 8 | +22 | 21 | 2.33 | |
| 3 | San Francisco Nighthawks (Q) | 9 | 6 | 1 | 2 | 25 | 12 | +13 | 20 | 2.22 | Conference Playoffs |
| 4 | Iron Rose FC | 9 | 4 | 0 | 5 | 23 | 10 | +13 | 17 | 1.89 | |
| 5 | Lamorinda United | 9 | 5 | 4 | 0 | 30 | 17 | +13 | 15 | 1.67 | |
| 6 | Napa Valley 1839 FC | 9 | 2 | 5 | 2 | 22 | 29 | −7 | 8 | 0.89 | |
| 7 | San Francisco Elite Soccer Club | 9 | 1 | 5 | 3 | 9 | 23 | −14 | 6 | 0.67 | |
| 8 | Fresno Freeze | 9 | 1 | 5 | 3 | 5 | 28 | −23 | 6 | 0.67 | |
| 9 | San Ramon FC | 9 | 1 | 6 | 2 | 10 | 25 | −15 | 5 | 0.56 | |
| 10 | Nevada Futbol Club | 9 | 1 | 7 | 1 | 13 | 36 | −23 | 4 | 0.44 | |

Source: WPSL standings
Rules for classification: 1) Head-to-head based on total points; 2) Total wins; 3) Goal difference all league games; 4) Goals scored in league games
(Q) Qualified for the phase indicated

==== So Cal Conference ====
===== Coastal Division =====
| Pos | Team | Pld | W | L | T | GF | GA | GD | Pts | PPG | Qualification |
|---|---|---|---|---|---|---|---|---|---|---|---|
| 1 | Beach Futbol Club | 8 | 5 | 1 | 2 | 21 | 11 | +10 | 17 | 2.13 | |
| 2 | FC Premier Women (Q) | 8 | 4 | 1 | 3 | 20 | 10 | +10 | 15 | 1.88 | Division Playoffs |
| 3 | Miss Kick FC | 8 | 3 | 1 | 4 | 19 | 11 | +8 | 13 | 1.63 | |
| 4 | Southern California Eagles | 8 | 1 | 5 | 2 | 4 | 19 | −15 | 5 | 0.63 | |
| 5 | LA Surf Soccer Club | 8 | 1 | 6 | 1 | 8 | 21 | −13 | 4 | 0.50 | |

Source: WPSL standings
Rules for classification: 1) Head-to-head based on total points; 2) Total wins; 3) Goal difference all league games; 4) Goals scored in league games
(Q) Qualified for the phase indicated

===== Plymouth Division =====
| Pos | Team | Pld | W | L | T | GF | GA | GD | Pts | PPG | Qualification |
|---|---|---|---|---|---|---|---|---|---|---|---|
| 1 | San Diego Surf | 8 | 5 | 1 | 2 | 22 | 9 | +13 | 17 | 2.13 | |
| 2 | San Diego Strikers (Q) | 8 | 4 | 3 | 1 | 18 | 9 | +9 | 13 | 1.63 | Division Playoffs |
| 3 | So Cal Union FC | 8 | 4 | 3 | 1 | 19 | 17 | +2 | 13 | 1.63 | |
| 4 | SoCal Dutch Lions FC | 8 | 4 | 4 | 0 | 18 | 23 | −5 | 12 | 1.50 | |
| 5 | Rebels Soccer Club | 8 | 3 | 3 | 2 | 13 | 17 | −4 | 11 | 1.38 | |
| 6 | San Diego Parceiro Ladies | 8 | 2 | 3 | 3 | 7 | 10 | −3 | 9 | 1.13 | |
| 7 | ALBION San Diego | 8 | 1 | 6 | 1 | 8 | 22 | −14 | 4 | 0.50 | |

Source: WPSL standings
Rules for classification: 1) Head-to-head based on total points; 2) Total wins; 3) Goal difference all league games; 4) Goals scored in league games
(Q) Qualified for the phase indicated

== Playoffs ==
Conference play-offs July 6 | Region Semifinals (Note: Matchup may change based on draw); July 13
NC | Charlotte Lady Eagles | 1
DC | McLean Soccer | 0
NC | Charlotte Lady Eagles | 5
Atlantic Conference
FL | West Florida Flames | 0
South Region
TX | Austin Rise FC | 1
TN | 865 Alliance | 0
CO | Colorado Pride | 2
MO | Union KC | 3
Central Region
SD | Sioux Falls City FC | 3(4)
Midwest Conference
IN | FC Pride | 3(5)
IN | FC Pride | 4
WI | FC Milwaukee Torrent | 1
CA | California Storm | 8
So Cal Conference
CA | FC Premier Women | 0
CA | San Diego Strikers | 1
CA | FC Premier Women | 2
West Region
WA | Spokane Shadow | 2
CA | San Francisco Nighthawks | 0
NY | Clarkstown Soccer Club | 4
NY | Niagara 1812 | 1
East Region
NY | SUSA FC | 1
Mid–Atlantic Conference
PA | Reading United A.C. | 2
PA | Reading United A.C. | 6
NJ | SJEB FC | 1

Region finals July 14
NC | Charlotte Lady Eagles | 4
TX | Austin Rise FC (Note: Regional Host) | 0
MO | Union KC | 1
IN | FC Pride | 2
CA | California Storm | 2(6)
WA | Spokane Shadow | 2(5)
NY | Clarkstown Soccer Club | 4
PA | Reading United A.C. | 2

National Semi–finals; July 20; Stillwater, OK
NC | Charlotte Lady Eagles | 2
IN | FC Pride | 0
CA | California Storm | 5
NY | Clarkstown Soccer Club | 0

National Finals; July 21; Stillwater, OK
NC | Charlotte Lady Eagles | 0
CA | California Storm | 1

== Awards ==
=== Player of the Week ===
| Week | Player | Club | Stats | Ref. |
|---|---|---|---|---|
| 2 | (United States) Lauren Rodriguez, GK | Utah Surf | Clean Sheet | |
| 3 | (United States) Hannah McNulty, FW | Rhode Island Rogues | 4 goals | |
| 4 | (United States) Corine Gregory, FW | Port City FC | 2 goals | |
| 5 | (United States) Savannah Taylor, DF | UK F.C. | 3 goals | |
| 6 | (United States) Tia Saade, FW | New York Athletic Club | Hat Trick | |
| 7 | (United States) Khyah Harper, FW | Salvo SC | 8 goals in two games | |
| 8 | (United States) Jordan Tenpas, DF | Sioux Falls City FC | Defensive Leader in undefeated season | |

=== Individual awards ===
| Award | Winner | Team | Reason | Ref. |
|---|---|---|---|---|
| Golden Boot | (United States) Khyah Harper | Salvo SC | 16 goals | |
| Defender of the Year | (United States) Chentay Warnes | Charlotte Lady Eagles | | |
| Player of the Year | (United States) Camryn Lancaster | California Storm | | |

=== All-Conference Teams ===
- **Bold** denotes the Conference Players of the Year.

All-Conference Teams
| Conference | Goalkeeper | Defenders | Midfielders | Forwards | Coach |
West Region
| Desert | **Erin Gibbs (Arizona Arsenal Soccer Club)** | Zoe Ballard (Arizona Arsenal Soccer Club); Shania Walters (FC Tucson); Kiki Smith (Royals AZ) | Luiza Travossos (FC Tucson); Jaime Black (FC Tucson); Sabrina Guzman (SC del Sol) | **Vivien Villarreal (FC Tucson)**; Tatum Thomason (SC del Sol); Tyra King (Arizona Arsenal Soccer Club); Mollie Baker (Royals AZ) | Mat Evans & Jared Bedard (SC del Sol) |
| Northwest | Mercedes Cullen (Spokane Shadow) | **Makayla Werner (Spokane Shadow)**; Kolo Suliafu (Seattle Reign FC II); Lucie Rokos (Portland Thorns FC II) | Livvy Moore (Spokane Shadow); Kyah Le (Spokane Shadow); Emilia Warta (Portland Thorns FC II) | **Merissa Garcia (Spokane Shadow)**; Cally Togaia (Portland Thorns FC II); Hailey Still (Seattle Reign FC II); Juju Harris (Seattle Reign FC II) | Drew Williams (Spokane Shadow) |
| Pac North | Abbie Faingold (California Storm) | **Elise Ziem (Lamorinda United)**; Amelia Villa (California Storm); Emma Scott (Iron Rose FC) | Alex Klos (California Storm); Mia Castillo (Lamorinda United); Karissa Ruble (Lamorinda United); Fatima Waldo Garcia (San Francisco Nighthawks) | **Camryn Lancaster (California Storm)**; Kim Garcia (Napa Valley 1839 FC); Sam Tristan (Iron Rose FC) | Zac Sullivan & Pip Harrigan (FC Davis) |
| So Cal - Coastal | **Zora Standifer (LA Surf Soccer Club)** | Kala McDaniel (MISS KICK FC); Ella Freebury (Beach Futbol Club); Skye Johnson (FC Premier Women); Liberty Ortiz (Southern California Eagles) | **Shannon Simon (Beach Futbol Club)**; Hope Paredes (MISS KICK FC); Kailey Park (FC Premier Women) | Megan Chelf (MISS KICK FC); Maile Hayes (Beach Futbol Club); Cherri Cox (FC Premier Women) | Aaron Rodriquez (FC Premier Women) |
| So Cal - Plymouth | Glo Hinojosa (Rebels Soccer Club) | **Edra Bello (San Diego Surf)**; Sarah Melcher (Rebels Soccer Club); Aleah Minnach (SoCal Dutch Lions FC) | Ines Derrien (San Diego Surf); Marissa LeVine (So Cal Union FC); Anya Van Den Einde (San Diego Surf) | **Brooke Miller (San Diego Surf)**; Kiera Bocchino (San Diego Strikers); Leah Kunde (ALBION San Diego); Morgan Witz (So Cal Union FC) | Rudy Canales (So Cal Union FC) |
Central Region
| Heartland | **Callie Sullivan (Oklahoma City FC)** | Addison Roberts (Oklahoma City FC); Reece Walrod (Union KC); Grace Winegar (Missouri Reign); Abby Small (Kansas City Courage II) | **Aya Saiki (Kansas City Courage II)**; Thayline Teixeira (Sunflower State FC); Courtney Claassen (Kansas City Courage II) | Kate Gibson (Union KC); Kaira Houser (Kansas City Courage II); Emma Rice (Oklahoma City FC) | Dan Naidu (Union KC) |
| Midwest - Gateway | **Abby Jenkins (FC Pride)** | Maddie Swingle (FC Pride); Ella Raimondi (FC Dayton); Carli Stinson (FC Dayton) | Summer Fishel (FC Pride); Gracie Dunaway (FC Pride); Leah Selm (Lou Fusz Athletic); Sarah Hiestand (Junction FC) | **Peyton Kohls (FC Dayton)**; Kayla Budish (FC Pride); Sarah Foley (Junction FC) | Kip McDaniel & Josh Stebbins (Junction FC) |
| Midwest - Lake Michigan | **Kate Hopma (Chicago House AC)** | Greta Hanson (FC Milwaukee Torrent); Ailyn Gallardo (Chicago House AC); Alyssa Mericle (Green Bay Glory) | Lainey Higgins (FC Milwaukee Torrent); McKayla Legois (Green Bay Glory); Maggie Schmidt (Chicago House AC); Madison Ferris (Chicago KICS Football Club) | **Josie Bieda (FC Milwaukee Torrent)**; Addison Stanciak (FC Milwaukee Torrent); Kayla Shebar (Chicago House AC) | Kerry Geocaris & Patrick Birder (Green Bay Glory) |
| Mountain - Rockies | Harlee Head (PSD Academy) | **Rachel Gerrie (Indios Denver FC)**; Sarah Dunn (Colorado Pride); Eva Bleam (PSD Academy) | Ava Amsden (Colorado Pride); Miriam Caberello (Indios Denver FC); Taylor Evans (PSD Academy) | **Bello (Colorado Pride)**; Cate Sheahan; Ariah Velasquez (Indios Denver FC); Abby Stassi (Colorado Pride) | Juan Martinez (Indios Denver FC) |
| Mountain - Wasatch | **Lauren Rodriguez (Utah Surf)** | Kylie Olsen (La Roca FC); Hope Munson (Utah Avalanche); Carlie Dare (Utah Surf) | Bella Devey (Utah Avalanche); Danika Serassio (Utah Surf); Emma Carver (Griffins FC) | **Seven Castain (Utah Avalanche)**; Hailey North (Griffins FC); Bizzy Arevalo (La Roca FC); Lily Boyden (La Roca FC) | Brad Silvey & Izzy Gines (Utah Surf) |
| Northern | **Cambell Fischer (Sioux Falls City FC)** | Jordan Tenpas (Sioux Falls City FC); Olivia Bohl (Minnesota Thunder); Jordan Jeffers (St. Croix Legacy) | Paige Kalal (Minnesota Thunder); Avery Murdzek (St. Croix Legacy); Molly Fiedler (Salvo SC) | Khyah Harper (Salvo SC); **Mia Mullenmeister (Sioux Falls City FC)**; Katharina Oelschlaeger (Sioux Falls City FC); Izzy Engle (Minnesota Thunder) | Joe DeMay (Sioux Falls City FC) |
South Region
| Atlantic - Carolinas | Blair Barefoot (Port City FC) | **Sallie Garner (Charlotte Eagles)**; Kaylee Risher (Port City FC); Joryn Hall (Port City FC) | Bri Myers (Charlotte Eagles); Ellie Farrell (Port City FC); Ava Myers (Charlotte Eagles) | **Corine Gregory (Port City FC)**; Meredith King (Charlotte Eagles); Katie Paulakonis (Trinity Fire); Zoei Kempf (Women's Football Club of Charlotte) | Chad Medcalfe (Port City FC) |
| Atlantic - The District | Phoebe Carber (Arlington Soccer) | **Savannah Taylor (UK F.C.)**; Amelia Warren (Washington Dutch Lions FC); Chesney Robinson (Arlington Soccer) | **Eliza Turner (McLean Soccer)**; Maddie Hurowitz (Alexandria Reds); Avery Hallum (Arlington Soccer) | Olivia Stafford (Arlington Soccer); Olivia Woodson (UK F.C.); Ava Nucci (UK F.C.); Jessica Robbert (Arlington Soccer) | George Hales (Arlington Soccer) |
| Lone Star | Peyton Urban (Austin Rise FC) | **Kameron Kloza (Classics Elite SA)**; Ryann Jergovich (Austin Rise FC); Miljana Smiljkovic (Houston Aces); Hali Hartman (SouthStar FC) | **Lily Erb (Austin Rise FC)**; Kendall Kloza (Classics Elite SA); Wakana Ose (Futbolera Select) | Mikayla Cunningham (Classics Elite SA); Hailey Sapinoro (Austin Rise FC); Taylor Jernigan (Classics Elite SA) | Tom Morrill & Owen Collie (Classics Elite SA) |
| Southeast | Cayden Norris (865 Alliance) | **Naomi Moleka (UFA Gunners)**; Lawson Renie (865 Alliance); Sylvie Keck (Nashville Rhythm F.C.) | **Alivia Stott (865 Alliance)**; Ashlyn Koutsos (UFA Gunners); Sachiko Gamo (Nashville Rhythm F.C.); Grace Eatz (Georgia Impact) | Jordynn Dudley (UFA Gunners); Alexis Washington (865 Alliance); Maddie Padelski (Nashville Rhythm F.C.) | Scott Davidson (Nashville Rhythm F.C.) |
| Sunshine | Acelya Aydogmus (Cape Coral Cyclones) | **Catarina Bastos (FC Prime)**; Savannah Larsen (West Florida Flames); D'Yolanda Pineda (Dade County Football Club) | Lola Ressler (Seminole Ice); Deborah Bien-Aime (FC Prime); Hayden Leplay (West Florida Flames) | **Emily Thompson (FC Prime)**; Jasmine Perez-Acosta (Cape Coral Cyclones); Mary Raymond (West Florida Flames); Ava Kooker (Seminole Ice) | Jaime McGuinness (West Florida Flames) |
East Region
| Great Lakes - Great River | Maddy Neundorfer (Beadling Soccer Club) | **Emma Rigone (Beadling Soccer Club)**; Ella Deevers (Ambassadors Cleveland); Norah Roush (Columbus Eagles FC) | Samantha Wiehe (Ambassadors Cleveland); Kelsey Salopek (Beadling Soccer Club); Rayann Pruss (Greater Toledo FC) | **Taylor Huff (Ambassadors Cleveland)**; Nikki Cox (Columbus Eagles FC); Taylor Hamlett (Ambassadors Cleveland); AAilyah Faddoul (Corktown WFC) | Caleb Fortune (Ambassadors Cleveland) |
| Great Lakes - Lake Erie | **Riley Morningstar (Erie FC)** | Madi Snyder (Cleveland Ambassadors); Thea Juul (Erie FC); Mia DiPasquale (Niagara 1812) | Ashley Townsend (Cleveland Ambassadors); Maia MacLean (Niagara 1812); Alina Garcia (Erie FC); Macy Hellwig (Niagara 1812) | **Margey Brown (Cleveland Ambassadors)**; Arianna Zumpano (Niagara 1812); Emily Marco (BC United) | Javier Iriart (Cleveland Ambassadors) |
| Metropolitan | **Annabelle Adams (New York Athletic Club)** | Brook Herber (SUSA FC); Claire Pinnie (Downtown United Soccer Club); Una McCorry (New York Athletic Club); Nicole Wilson (STA) | **Emily Riggins (SUSA FC)**; Syndey Masur (STA); Dylan Jovanovic (Downtown United Soccer Club) | Ashley Bell (SUSA FC); Monica Viveros (Downtown United Soccer Club); Jaiden Schultz (STA) | JR Balzarini (SUSA FC) |
| Mid-Atlantic - Colonial | Grace Keen (Delaware Ospreys) | **Sydni Wright (Delaware Ospreys)**; Eden Veenema (Penn Fusion SA); Allison Gilbert (Real Central NJ) | Ava Curtis (Real Central NJ); Adrianna Pepe (SJEB FC); Susanna Soderman (Penn Fusion SA); Ashlee Brentlinger (Delaware Ospreys) | **Bella Miller (Real Central NJ)**; Delaney Lappin (SJEB FC); Madison Shumate (Penn Fusion SA) | Brian Thomsen (Real Central NJ) |
| Mid-Atlantic - Commonwealth | Autum Monty (Reading United A.C.) | **Lauren Costello (Keystone FC)**; Emily Banashefski (Hex FC Tempest); Leah Buch (PA Classics) | **Jailene DeJesus (PA Classics)**; Ashley Lavrich (Reading United A.C.); Mia Libby (Keystone FC); Haleigh Wintersteen (Hex FC Tempest) | Courtney Andruczk (Keystone FC); Halle Engle (Keystone FC); Elizabeth Estrada (PA Classics) | Tom Gosselin (Reading United A.C.) |
| Northeastern | Maddie Bulens (Merrimack Valley Hawks FC) | **Maddy DeCola (Clarkstown Soccer Club)**; Emanuelley Ferreira (Merrimack Valley Hawks FC); Parker Roberts (Rhode Island Rogues); Stella Tapia (Clarkstown Soccer Club) | Ciera Lundy (New York Shockers); Ashley Moon (Clarkstown Soccer Club); Marissa Sage (Merrimack Valley Hawks FC) | **Kelly Brady (Clarkstown Soccer Club)**; Meredith McDermott (Merrimack Valley Hawks FC); Hannah McNulty (Rhode Island Rogues) | Danny Samimi (Clarkstown Soccer Club) |

== Franchises of the Year ==
| Region | Conference | Team | Ref. |
|---|---|---|---|
| West Region | Desert | SC del Sol | |
| West Region | Northwest | Spokane Shadow | |
| West Region | Pac North | California Storm | |
| West Region | So Cal - Coastal | MISS KICK FC | |
| West Region | So Cal - Plymouth | So Cal Union FC | |
| Central Region | Heartland | Oklahoma City FC | |
| Central Region | Midwest - Gateway | FC Pride | |
| Central Region | Midwest - Lake Michigan | Chicago House | |
| Central Region | Mountain - Rockies | Colorado Pride | |
| Central Region | Mountain - Wasatch | Utah Surf | |
| Central Region | Northern | Sioux Falls City FC | |
| South Region | Atlantic - Carolinas | Charlotte Eagles | |
| South Region | Atlantic - The District | Arlington Soccer | |
| South Region | Lone Star | Austin Rise FC | |
| South Region | Southeast | Decatur FC | |
| South Region | Sunshine | AGC Football | |
| East Region | Great Lakes - Great Rivers | Columbus Eagles FC | |
| East Region | Great Lakes - Lake Erie | Cleveland Ambassadors | |
| East Region | Metropolitan | STA | |
| East Region | Mid-Atlantic - Colonial | Real Central NJ | |
| East Region | Mid-Atlantic - Commonwealth | Reading United A.C. | |
| East Region | Northeastern | Clarkstown Soccer Club | |
