= Columbus FC =

Columbus FC might refer to:

- Columbus Crew SC, American soccer team based in Columbus, Ohio
- FC Columbus, American soccer team based in Columbus, Ohio
- Columbus Eagles FC, American soccer team based in Columbus, Ohio
- ICSF Columbus FC, Canadian soccer team based in Vancouver
