= Fresno Freeze FC =

Association football team

- Full name: Fresno Freeze Futbol Club
- Founded: November 3, 2014; 11 years ago
- Stadium: Keith Tice Park
- Head coach: Ivan Janssens
- League: Women's Premier Soccer League
- 2018: Regular season: 1st, Pacific-North Playoffs: West Regional semifinal
- Website: https://fresnofreeze.com/
Home colors	Away colors

Fresno Freeze Futbol Club is an amateur women's soccer team based in Fresno, California.

== History ==
Fresno Freeze FC is an American professional soccer team based in Fresno, California. The team was founded in 2014 and played its inaugural season in 2015. The team competes in Women's Premier Soccer League (WPSL), the second tier of the US women's soccer league system.

== Colors and crest ==
Freeze colors are ice blue and black. The club's logo is based on a shield shaped like the head of a spade with the background being black. Across the top of this shield is the name of the team name in white outlined in blue, while below are two vertical blue lines. At base of the crest is a frozen soccer ball representing the team's name.

== Stadium ==
The Fresno Freeze hosts its games at Keith Tice Park.

== Year-by-year ==
Season-by-season records
Year	Division	League	Regular season	Playoffs
2015	2	WPSL	2nd, Pacific-North	did not qualify
2016	2	WPSL	2nd, Pacific-North	did not qualify
2017	2	WPSL	2nd, Pacific-North	did not qualify
2018	2	WPSL	1st, Pacific-North	West Regional semifinal
2019	Did not play			
2020	season cancelled due to COVID-19 pandemic			
2021	4	WPSL	6th, Group F	did not qualify
2022	4	WPSL	2nd, Group V	Pac North Conference semi-finals
2023	4	WPSL	2nd, Pac North	did not qualify
2024	4	WPSL	8th, Pac North	did not qualify
2025	4	WPSL	2nd, NorCal	did not qualify
2026	4	WPSL	7th, Central Valley	did not qualify
