= Colorado Pride =

American women's soccer club

- Founded: 1994
- Stadium: UCCS Mtn Lion Stadium; Colorado Springs, Colorado
- Capacity: 1,100
- Head Coach: Andi Waterhouse
- League: WPSL Rockies Division
- 2022 WPSL: 2nd, Rockies Division; Playoffs: DNQ
- Website: http://www.pridesoccer.com/programs/wpsl-colorado-pride/

Colorado Pride is an American women's soccer club that was founded in 1994. The team is a 2016 inaugural member of United Women's Soccer. They played in the W-League in 2014 and 2015.

== Year-by-year ==
Year	League	Reg. season	Playoffs
2014	W-League	2nd, Western Conference	Championship Game
2015	W-League	2nd, Western Conference	Championship Game
2016	UWS	4th, Western Division	Did not qualify
2017	Hiatus		
2018	UWS	5th, West Conference	Did not qualify
2019	UWS	5th, West Conference	Did not qualify
2020	Season cancelled due to COVID-19		
2021	WPSL	4th, Group G	Did not qualify
2022	WPSL	2nd, Rockies Division	Did not qualify
2023	WPSL	2nd, Rockies Division	Did not qualify
2024	WPSL	1st, Rockies Division	Regional Semifinals
2025	WPSL	3rd, Rockies Division	did not qualify

== Head coaches ==
(Australia) Daniel Clitnovici (2014)
(Wales) Sian Hudson (2015)

== Awards ==
Chloe Logarzo - 2014 W-League Rookie of the Year
Daniel Clitnovici - 2014 W-League Coach of the Year

Tara Andrews - 2015 USL W-League MVP and Golden Boot Award

Britt Eckerstrom -2015 W-League Goalkeeper of the Year
