= Austin Rise FC =

- Founded: 2022
- Ground: House Park Stadium, Austin, Texas
- Capacity: 6,500
- Manager: Bethany Cyrtmus-Davaul
- Coach: Rogerio Celaya
- League: WPSL
- 2024: 1st, Lonestar Conference, 2nd South Region
- Website: https://www.austinrisefc.com/

Austin Rise FC is an American semi-professional women's soccer club based in Austin, Texas. The club was established in 2022 and is fully women-owned. They compete in the Women's Premier Soccer League as a member of the Texas Triangle Conference. Austin Rise's home matches are played at House Park Stadium in Austin, Texas.

== History ==
In July 2022, a group of six women developed the idea for a women's soccer club based on cultivating a positive experience for their players, staff, fans, and partners. This idea was born out of their own experience which included the collapse of a previous club they were involved with. The founders are Amanda Lisberger, Rachelle D'Amico, Erin Webb, Bethany Cyrtmus-Davaul, Katie Reed, and Christiane Lessa. On August 22, 2023, WPSL announced that Austin Rise FC had signed a letter of intent to be one of the founding clubs for the WPSL PRO.

=== First seasons ===
Austin Rise FC participated in the 2023 WPSL season as their first season as a club. Austin Rise FC was aligned in the Texas Triangle Conference of the WPSL. The team will play their first match on May 27, 2023 against the Challenge Red Devils. Their first home match coming on Jun 11, 2023 against the San Antonio Blossom.

Austin Rise FC's first official game, also resulted in their first points earned in WPSL play, by earning a 0–0 draw against the Challenge Red Devils. On June 2, 2023, Beth Ann Davis became Austin Rise FC's first goal scorer, getting one against Lonestar SC in a 4–1 loss on the road. Two days later, Amanda Lisberger, both a founder and player, scored the team's first brace against the Houston Aces, but the team still fell in that match 4–2. Austin Rise FC earned their first win of the season on June 17, 2023 with a 2–1 win over the Houston Aces at House Park, on goals by Alexis Lawrence and Cristina Diaz Cerda. Two weeks later, Austin Rise FC earned their first clean sheet defeating Bat Country FC in their first meeting, on goals from Grace Starr, Bethany Cyrtmus-Davaul, and Brigid McElderry. Austin Rise FC ended the season in 4th Place in the Texas Triangle Conference with a 4W–3D–3L record and a +2 goal differential. Bethany Cyrtmus-Davaul was their leading scoring with 4 goals on the season.

For the 2024 season, Austin Rise was aligned in the Lonestar Conference in the South Region, with five other teams. The conference consisted of Austin Rise, Classic Elite SA out of San Antonio, expansion side Futbolero Select out of Houston, expansion side San Antonio Runners, SouthStar out of DFW, and the Houston Aces. The conference was set up to play a balanced home and away schedule with the season kicking off on May 18 and the winners qualifying as host for the South Region playoffs on July 13–14. Austin Rise clinched the regular season title after their week 8 win against Fubolera Select, with one game left to play in the season. Austin Rise was selected to host the South Region play-offs as the Lone Star Conference Champions. Austin was drawn against FC Primetime in their first ever playoff match, winning 1–0 to advance to the regional finals. Austin Rise faced Charlotte Eagles, the 2023 WPSL Champions, in the regional final, losing 4–0, ending their season.

== Fully professional ==
Austin Rise FC announced their intent to become a fully professional women's soccer team on August 22, 2023. WPSL Pro will be a Division III professional league, below the National Women's Soccer League and USL Super League. The league will run a spring to fall season to coincide with the NWSL's fall to spring season. Austin Rise FC is planned as one of the ten teams planned when the league start in 2025.

== Sponsorship ==
Period	Kit manufacturer	Shirt sponsor	Sleeve sponsor	Ref.
2023–present	Diaza	Ally Medical Emergency Room	Juiceland	

== Management team ==
Position	Name
Manager	(United States) Bethany Cyrtmus-Davaul
Coach	(Mexico) Rogerio Celaya

=== Coaching History ===
As of June 1, 2025

Name	Years	Matches	Won	Drawn	Lost	Win %
(United States) Tom Krall	2023	10	4	3	3	.550
(Mexico) Rogerio Celaya	2024–	16	10	4	2	.708

== Roster ==
As of June 26, 2024

No.	Pos.	Nation	Player
00	GK	USA	Emma Payton
0	GK	USA	Peyton Urban
2	DF	USA	Ryann Jergovich
3	DF	USA	Hanna Sanderson
4	MF	USA	Tatiana Leggiero
5	FW	USA	Amanda Lisberger (Captain)
7	MF	USA	Lily Erb
8	MF	USA	Vanessa Adams
9	FW	USA	Hailey Sapinoro
10	FW	DOM	Emma Torres
11	DF	USA	Gabrielle Criscione
12	DF	USA	Sky Gardner
15		USA	JP Medina
16	MF	USA	Brigid McElderry
17	MF	USA	Audrey Castaneda
18	MF		Sara Asbeck
19	MF	USA	Beth Ann Davis
20	FW	USA	Addison Bray
21	FW	USA	Annika Freddell
24	FW	USA	Alexis Lawrence
26	MF	USA	Bella Cruz
29	FW	USA	Alyssa Aguilar
31	FW	USA	Lourdes Sankar
32	MF	USA	Sarah Hauck
34	FW	USA	Cam Patton
99	DF	USA	Grace Starr
—		USA	Casey Mendoza
—	DF	USA	Emily Rangel
—	FW	USA	Pamela Lasprilla
—	GK	USA	Mckenzie Hunninghake

== Year-by-year ==
As of July 13, 2026

Season	League												Position	Playoffs
Season	Div	League	Conference	Pld	W	D	L	GF	GA	GD	Pts	PPG	Conf.	Playoffs
2023	4	WPSL	Texas Triangle	10	4	3	3	17	15	+2	15	1.50	4th	DNQ
2024	4	WPSL	Lone Star	10	6	3	1	23	9	+14	21	2.10	1st	Conference Finals
2025	4	WPSL	Lone Star	10	7	1	2	18	8	+10	22	2.20	1st	Region Semifinals
2026	4	WPSL	Lone Star	8	6	1	1	23	5	+18	19	2.38	1st	Region Semifinals
Total				30	17	7	6	58	32	+26	58	1.93	–	

== Awards and honors ==
=== Team ===
==== WPSL ====
- Lone Star Conference – Regular Season Champions: 2024, 2025, 2026

=== Individual ===
==== Best XI ====
Year	Award	Awardee	Position	Ref
2023	Texas Triangle Conference Best XI	(United States) Natalie Green	DF	
2023	Texas Triangle Conference Best XI	(Spain) Cristina Diaz Cerda	MF	
2024	Lone Star All-Conference	(United States) Peyton Urban	GK	
2024	Lone Star All-Conference	(United States) Ryann Jergovich	DF	
2024	Lone Star All-Conference	(United States) Lily Erb	MF	
2024	Lone Star All-Conference	(United States) Hailey Sapinoro	FW	
2025	Lone Star All-Conference	(Puerto Rico) Alondra Iriarte	GK	
2025	Lone Star All-Conference	(England) Lauren Westwood	DF	
2025	Lone Star All-Conference	(United States) Tori Lucksinger	MF	
2025	Lone Star All-Conference	(United States) Maya Ramirez	FW	

==== South Region - Players of the Year ====
Year	Name	Position	Reference
2024	(United States) Lily Erb	MF	
2025	(Puerto Rico) Alondra Iriarte	GK	
2025	(England) Lauren Westwood	MF	

==== South Region - Organization of the Year ====
Year	Organization	Reference
2024	Austin Rise FC	
2025	Austin Rise FC (2)	

==== Austin Rise Player Awards ====
Year	Player of the Year	Rising Star	Defender of the Year	Goal of the Year
2023	Cristina Diaz	Sara Navarro	Natalee Geren	Angela Fuster Sendra
