= 2015 WPSL season =

Women's Premier Soccer League
- Season: 2015
- Champions: Red Stars Reserves

The 2015 Women's Premier Soccer League season is the 18th season of the WPSL.

== Standings ==
=== Northwest ===
Pos	Team	Pld	W	L	T	GF	GA	GD	Pts
1	Issaquah Soccer Club	12	8	1	3	39	9	+30	27
2	FC Tacoma 253	10	6	3	1	25	9	+16	19
3	Eugene Timbers FC Azul	10	4	3	3	16	10	+6	15
4	Portland Spartans	10	4	5	1	10	15	−5	13
5	Olympic Force	10	2	5	3	7	22	−15	9
6	Fuerza FC	10	1	8	1	7	38	−31	4

Source: wpslsoccer.com
Rules for classification: 1) Points; 2) Head to head record between teams; 3) Goal difference between teams; 4) Goal difference within the division; 5) Most goals scored within the league; 6) Fewest goals scored against within league; 7) coin toss.

=== Pacific-North ===
Pos	Team	Pld	W	L	T	GF	GA	GD	Pts
1	California Storm	12	9	3	0	46	19	+27	27
2	Fresno Freeze FC	12	8	3	1	45	17	+28	25
3	Tottenham Hotspur Eastbay Ladies	13	7	6	0	23	25	−2	21
4	San Francisco Nighthawks	13	5	6	2	33	31	+2	17
5	North Bay FC Wave	12	4	5	3	32	26	+6	15
6	West Coast Wildkatz	12	4	6	2	22	25	−3	14
7	Primero de Mayo	12	0	12	0	2	79	−77	0

Source: wpslsoccer.com
Rules for classification: 1) Points; 2) Head to head record between teams; 3) Goal difference between teams; 4) Goal difference within the division; 5) Most goals scored within the league; 6) Fewest goals scored against within league; 7) coin toss.

=== Pacific-South ===
Pos	Team	Pld	W	L	T	GF	GA	GD	Pts
1	SoCal FC	13	10	1	2	37	12	+25	32
2	San Diego SeaLions	10	6	3	1	17	10	+7	19
3	Beach Futbol Club	9	6	2	1	29	7	+22	19
4	FC Tucson Women	9	6	2	1	17	9	+8	19
5	Legends FC	9	3	4	2	17	18	−1	11
6	Tijuana Xolos USA	9	3	4	2	15	23	−8	11
7	Pateadores	9	3	6	0	10	21	−11	9
8	Phoenix Del Sol	9	2	4	3	11	12	−1	9
9	L.A. Premier FC	9	2	5	2	7	14	−7	8
10	L.A. Villa F.C.	9	0	9	0	9	38	−29	0

Source: wpslsoccer.com
Rules for classification: 1) Points; 2) Head to head record between teams; 3) Goal difference between teams; 4) Goal difference within the division; 5) Most goals scored within the league; 6) Fewest goals scored against within league; 7) coin toss.

=== Big Sky ===
Pos	Team	Pld	W	L	T	GF	GA	GD	Pts	Qualification
1	Oklahoma City FC	16	12	3	1	37	12	+25	37	WPSL playoffs
2	Real Salt Lake Women	15	11	3	1	47	13	+34	34	
3	Houston Aces	14	10	2	2	29	9	+20	32	
4	Texas Spurs FC	15	8	5	2	23	25	−2	26	
5	Austin Aces	14	5	5	4	24	17	+7	19	
6	Texas Titans	14	3	9	2	14	36	−22	11	
7	Fort Worth Panthers	14	2	9	3	9	30	−21	9	
8	FC Tulsa Spirit	15	0	14	1	6	45	−39	1	
9	Houston Aces South Select	0	0	0	0	0	0	0	0	

Source: wpslsoccer.com
Rules for classification: 1) Points; 2) Head to head record between teams; 3) Goal difference between teams; 4) Goal difference within the division; 5) Most goals scored within the league; 6) Fewest goals scored against within league; 7) coin toss.

=== Midwest - Central ===
Pos	Team	Pld	W	L	T	GF	GA	GD	Pts
1	Chicago Red Stars Reserves	14	13	0	1	47	7	+40	40
2	Fire and Ice Soccer Club	10	8	1	1	29	6	+23	25
3	Quad City Eagles	10	4	6	0	16	28	−12	12
4	Des Moines Menace	10	3	5	2	13	16	−3	11
5	KC Courage	10	1	6	3	7	29	−22	6
6	Minnesota TwinStars	10	1	8	1	8	28	−20	4

Source: wpslsoccer.com
Rules for classification: 1) Points; 2) Head to head record between teams; 3) Goal difference between teams; 4) Goal difference within the division; 5) Most goals scored within the league; 6) Fewest goals scored against within league; 7) coin toss.

=== Midwest - Great Lakes ===
Pos	Team	Pld	W	L	T	GF	GA	GD	Pts
1	Motor City FC	11	9	1	1	28	7	+21	28
2	FC Indiana	10	3	3	4	25	8	+17	13
3	FC Pride	10	3	4	3	11	15	−4	12
4	Cincinnati Lady Saints	10	3	5	2	15	21	−6	11
5	Michigan Lions	10	3	5	2	22	25	−3	11
6	Columbus Eagles	10	2	6	2	8	30	−22	8

Source: wpslsoccer.com
Rules for classification: 1) Points; 2) Head to head record between teams; 3) Goal difference between teams; 4) Goal difference within the division; 5) Most goals scored within the league; 6) Fewest goals scored against within league; 7) coin toss.

=== Northeast ===
Pos	Team	Pld	W	L	T	GF	GA	GD	Pts
1	Boston Breakers Reserves	13	11	1	1	41	11	+30	34
2	Seacoast United Phantoms	10	7	2	1	24	17	+7	22
3	Boston Breakers College	10	5	2	3	25	9	+16	18
4	Boston Aztec	10	4	5	1	13	16	−3	13
5	Seacoast United Mariners	10	2	8	0	20	27	−7	6
6	Rhode Island Reds FC	10	0	10	0	10	49	−39	0

Source: wpslsoccer.com
Rules for classification: 1) Points; 2) Head to head record between teams; 3) Goal difference between teams; 4) Goal difference within the division; 5) Most goals scored within the league; 6) Fewest goals scored against within league; 7) coin toss.

=== Can Am ===
Pos	Team	Pld	W	L	T	GF	GA	GD	Pts
1	Empire Revs WNY	9	7	1	1	33	8	+25	22
2	Steel City FC	7	5	1	1	25	4	+21	16
3	Syracuse Lady Knights	7	1	6	0	7	20	−13	3
4	Tkaronto Justice	8	1	7	0	2	42	−40	3

Source: wpslsoccer.com
Rules for classification: 1) Points; 2) Head to head record between teams; 3) Goal difference between teams; 4) Goal difference within the division; 5) Most goals scored within the league; 6) Fewest goals scored against within league; 7) coin toss.

=== Power 5 ===
Pos	Team	Pld	W	L	T	GF	GA	GD	Pts
1	New England Mutiny	10	8	2	0	22	7	+15	24
2	New York Athletic Club	8	5	1	2	20	4	+16	17
3	BuxMont Torch FC	8	3	5	0	12	20	−8	9
4	Jersey Blues FC	8	1	4	3	10	22	−12	6
5	Lancaster Inferno	8	1	6	1	12	23	−11	4

Source: wpslsoccer.com
Rules for classification: 1) Points; 2) Head to head record between teams; 3) Goal difference between teams; 4) Goal difference within the division; 5) Most goals scored within the league; 6) Fewest goals scored against within league; 7) coin toss.

=== Mid Atlantic ===
Pos	Team	Pld	W	L	T	GF	GA	GD	Pts
1	Yankee Lady FC	9	6	2	1	25	11	+14	19
2	Hershey Soccer Club	9	5	2	2	18	15	+3	17
3	Long Island Fury	8	3	2	3	16	13	+3	12
4	FC Bucks	8	1	5	2	3	11	−8	5
5	FC Westchester	8	0	7	1	7	26	−19	1

Source: wpslsoccer.com
Rules for classification: 1) Points; 2) Head to head record between teams; 3) Goal difference between teams; 4) Goal difference within the division; 5) Most goals scored within the league; 6) Fewest goals scored against within league; 7) coin toss.

=== South Atlantic ===
Pos	Team	Pld	W	L	T	GF	GA	GD	Pts
1	ASA Charge FC	8	7	0	1	34	8	+26	22
2	Fredericksburg FC	8	6	2	0	21	12	+9	18
3	Virginia Beach City FC	8	4	3	1	17	21	−4	13
4	Chesterfield United	8	1	6	1	6	25	−19	4
5	ACF Torino USA	8	0	5	3	7	19	−12	3

Source: wpslsoccer.com
Rules for classification: 1) Points; 2) Head to head record between teams; 3) Goal difference between teams; 4) Goal difference within the division; 5) Most goals scored within the league; 6) Fewest goals scored against within league; 7) coin toss.

=== Sunshine ===
Pos	Team	Pld	W	L	T	GF	GA	GD	Pts
1	Tampa Bay Hellenic	8	8	0	0	27	3	+24	24
2	Pinellas County United SC	8	5	3	0	11	7	+4	15
3	Florida Krush	8	4	2	2	20	16	+4	14
4	Florida Sol FC	8	3	3	2	14	14	0	11
5	Palm City	8	3	3	2	13	13	0	11
6	FC Surge	8	3	3	2	18	17	+1	11
7	Team Boca Blast	8	1	3	4	7	11	−4	7
8	NTC Rush	7	1	5	1	5	13	−8	4
9	Treasure Coast Dynamites	8	1	6	1	9	28	−19	4

Source: wpslsoccer.com
Rules for classification: 1) Points; 2) Head to head record between teams; 3) Goal difference between teams; 4) Goal difference within the division; 5) Most goals scored within the league; 6) Fewest goals scored against within league; 7) coin toss.

=== Southeast ===
Pos	Team	Pld	W	L	T	GF	GA	GD	Pts
1	Knoxville Lady Force	8	6	1	1	23	6	+17	19
2	FC Nashville Wolves	7	3	1	3	13	7	+6	12
3	Alabama F.C.	7	1	5	1	1	15	−14	4
4	Chattanooga FC	7	0	4	3	3	15	−12	3

Source: wpslsoccer.com
Rules for classification: 1) Points; 2) Head to head record between teams; 3) Goal difference between teams; 4) Goal difference within the division; 5) Most goals scored within the league; 6) Fewest goals scored against within league; 7) coin toss.

== Playoffs ==
Regional semi-finals
(California) SoCal FC
(California) Tottenham East Bay Ladies
(Pennsylvania) Hershey FC	1
(Massachusetts) Boston Breakers Reserves	6

Regional finals
Oklahoma City FC	2
(Tennessee) Knoxville	0
(Michigan) Motor City	0
(Illinois) Red Stars Reserves	2
(Washington (state)) Issaquah Soccer Club
(California) SoCal FC
(Massachusetts) New England Mutiny	0
(Massachusetts) Boston Breakers Reserves	2

National semi-finals
Oklahoma City FC
(Illinois) Red Stars Reserves
(California) SoCal FC
(Massachusetts) Boston Breakers Reserves

National finals
(Illinois) Red Stars Reserves
(California) SoCal FC
