= Columbus Eagles FC =

American women's soccer club

- Full name: Columbus Eagles Football Club
- Nickname: The Eagles
- Short name: CEFC
- Founded: 2014
- Ground: Historic Crew Stadium
- Capacity: 2,500
- President: Mark Wise
- Manager: Matt Ogden
- League: Women's Premier Soccer League
- Website: https://www.columbuseaglesfc.com

Columbus Eagles Football Club is a women's soccer club based in Columbus, Ohio. The Eagles have been a member of the Women's Premier Soccer League (WPSL) since the club's inception in 2014. The team plays its home matches at Historic Crew Stadium on the Ohio fairgrounds.

In 2018, the team's fifth season, the Eagles finished second in the Valley Division of the WPSL and set club records for league wins (5) and points (16) in a season. The team was founded by its current CEO Mark Wise. The head coach is Matt Ogden, who's also the head women's soccer coach at Capital University in Columbus, Ohio.

== History ==
The Eagles were founded in 2014 and started WPSL play shortly after. The club has had three managers in its history – Mark Wise, Daniel Seiffert, and Matt Ogden – and is 15-28-9 in six seasons in the WPSL. The Eagles' best league finish was in 2018 when they finished 2nd in a 9-team division.

Mark Wise founded the Eagles and managed the team from 2014-16. The team's first win came against FC Indiana (1-0) in June 2015. The team struggled through its first three seasons, amassing just four wins in 26 matches, but Sydney Blomquist led the way that season and went on to play professionally overseas.

Daniel Seiffert took over the team in 2017 and the tide began to turn. Former NCAA Division I players Kelly DeNiro (University of Akron) and Lisa Nouanesengsy (Indiana University) joined the squad along with Dani Gunderson (Christopher Newport University) and the Eagles finished 3-4-1 (good for third place) in the WPSL's Valley division. Seiffert talked to Midfield Press about the team's evolution and progress during the early months of 2018.

The 2018 version of the Eagles was another record-breaking one. Midfielder Ashley Gogolin (Wright State University and Chicago Red Stars), defender Megan Minnix (University of Charlotte), and midfielder Micaela Powers (University of Wisconsin) joined the roster and helped the Eagles to a 5-1-2 record and 16 points. The club finished second in the Valley division behind eventual-East regional winners Cleveland Ambassadors. Columbus was the only team to take points from Cleveland in the season, after coming back from 3-0 down to draw 3-3 with the Ambassadors.

Seiffert and his wife Mary Seiffert (who was the Eagles' club captain) left to take over Indiana Wesleyan University's women's soccer program in late 2018, and the Eagles hired Matt Ogden as head coach. Ogden is the head women's soccer coach at Capital University and won an Ohio Athletic Conference title with the Crusaders in 2015. Under Ogden, the Eagles found a new, attacking style and brought in a new crop of talented college players from Ohio University and Bowling Green State University, among others. Columbus finished 3-5-2 (fourth place) in the Valley division in 2019, but scored the most goals in a single-season in club history (18) and set a record for single-match goals (6) in a win over Dayton Dutch Lions in May.

== Club colors, crest and kits ==
The Eagles announced a new crest and logo in October 2018. The crest was designed in-house by former Eagles midfielder Larissa Najjar (Ohio University) and received much public praise, making it to MLS Reddit and UniWatch. The club began selling new merchandise shortly after.

The team's primary colors are black (#101010) and gold (#fecd08), with accent colors of purple (#50384f), gray (#787878), and white (#ffffff). The team's colors closely align with that of the Columbus Crew, which helps unify the soccer colors in central Ohio.

In March 2019, the Eagles announced that they would play in custom matchday kits for the first time in their history. Najjar (now the lead designer of the Eagles) designed the home, away, and goalkeeper kits along with Eagles COO Grant Burkhardt. The Eagles' home kit is black with gold dots, and the away kit is gold and white with diagonal stripes. The designs were thoughtful ones, constructed with female soccer players in mind.

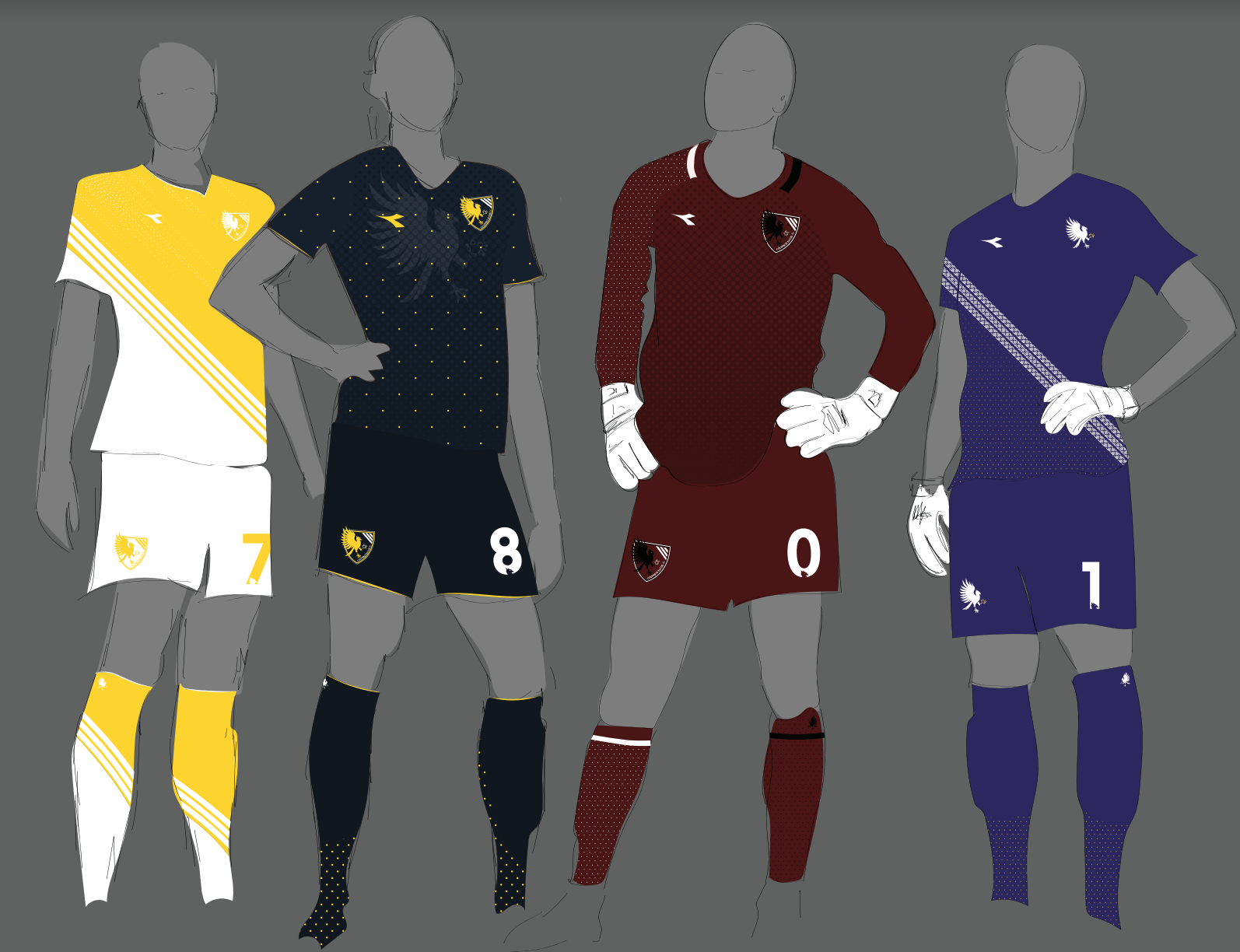
Home, away, and goalkeeper kits

=== Apparel sponsors and primary sponsors ===
Period	Kit supplier	Shirt sponsor
2014-17	Adidas	Comprehensive Wealth Partners
2017–Present	Diadora	None
2019-2022	Errea	TBD

== Matches at MAPFRE Stadium ==
The Eagles are the only WPSL side ever to host a match at a Major League Soccer stadium. The club has twice played at Historic Crew Stadium, formerly known as MAPFRE Stadium and the former home of the Columbus Crew.

In 2016 at MAPFRE, Eagles forward Molly Cornwell scored twice in the final 10 minutes of the match to beat Cincinnati Sirens FC, 2-1. In 2017, the Eagles and Sirens played again at MAPFRE and Columbus won 4-2 on the back of two goals from Gunderson, one from defender Corie Moore, and one from forward Erin Brockway.

Beginning in 2023, the Eagles reached an agreement with the Columbus Crew to use Historic Crew Stadium for their home matches.

== Player accolades ==
2019:

Four Eagles were named to the WPSL's All-Conference team in 2019 – Gogolin made it back-to-back appearances on the team, and Micaela Powers, Madison Costner, and top-scorer Alivia Milesky also made the team.

2018:

Gogolin, Minnix, and captain Amber Kern (University of Akron) were named WPSL All-Conference players in 2018 after leading the Eagles to a record season. Eagles fans voted goalkeeper Hannah Sargent (Western Michigan University) as the club's "Player of the Year" for her performance throughout the season. Sargent started all 8 WPSL matches and allowed just seven goals in more than 650 minutes played. She recorded four shutouts.

2017:

Four members of the 2017 Eagles earned WPSL All Star status: Midfielders Kelly DeNiro, Dani Gunderson, and Lisa Nouanesengsy earned the honor, as did defender Amber Kern.

== Club records and accolades ==
2019:

In 2019, the Eagles set their season membership record for the second straight year and broke its single-season attendance record. The club won social media and marketing awards for best Instagram, Twitter, and Facebook pages, as well as best social media graphics and video work.

In a July match at Cleveland, the Eagles set a club record for most-watched live match at over 1,700 viewers.

2018:

Weeks before the start of the 2018 season, the Eagles surpassed a record number of season ticket holders. The Eagles have once again broke that record in 2019, more than a month before their WPSL season begins.

In 2018, the WPSL named the Eagles the "Social Media Team of the Year" for its marketing efforts across Twitter, Instagram, Facebook, and YouTube. The club also won awards for its in-match updates, video content, and graphic design.

The club set its single-match attendance record on June 16, 2018 against Empire United. That match was played in front of a record crowd of more than 400 people at Columbus's home field at Otterbein University. Columbus also set its single-season attendance record in 2018.

== Previous seasons/results ==
=== Season-by-season ===
As of July 13, 2026

Season	Women's Premier Soccer League								Playoffs
Season	P	W	D	L	GF	GA	Pts	Position	Playoffs
2026	8	6	0	2	28	6	18	2nd, Great River	Conference Semifinals
2025	8	8	0	0	26	3	24	1st, Great River	DNQ
2024	8	5	1	2	22	12	16	2nd, Great River	DNQ
2023	8	6	1	1	39	12	19	1st, National Road	DNQ
2022	3	1	0	2	2	8	3	3rd, Group E	DNQ
2021	12	2	1	9	12	39	7	7th, Group K	DNQ
2020	Season canceled due to COVID-19								
2019	11	3	2	6	19	21	11	4th, Ohio Valley	DNQ
2018	8	5	2	1	21	7	17	2nd, Ohio Valley	DNQ
2017	8	3	1	4	10	24	10	3rd, Valley	DNQ
