= Real Central New Jersey =

American soccer team

- Full name: Real Central New Jersey Soccer
- Founded: 2020; 6 years ago
- Stadium: Ben Cohen Field at Rider University; Lawrence Township, New Jersey
- Owners: Ben Chrnelich, Ira Jersey, Jeremy Ryan
- Head Coaches: USL2 - Brian Woods, WPSL Brian Thomsen, EPSL - Ira Jersey
- League: USL League Two; Women's Premier Soccer League; Eastern Premier Soccer League
- Website: realcentralnj.soccer
| Home colors | Away colors |

Real Central New Jersey is a soccer club from Trenton, New Jersey, United States, founded in 2020. The club's men's First Team competes in the Mid-Atlantic Division of USL League Two, and began playing in the 2021 season. The women's team participates in the Women's Premier Soccer League.

The club marks the first soccer team to play in Mercer County since the Penn-Jersey Spirit of the now-disbanded American Professional Soccer League last played in 1991 and the New Jersey Wildcats which folded in 2012. Like the Spirit, RCNJ intended to play out of The College of New Jersey's Lions Stadium. Due to COVID-19 related issues, the club played its first two seasons at Mercer County Community College. The USL2 team kicked off the season against in-state rivals the Ocean City Nor'easters, losing 3–0.

In its inaugural campaign, Real Central NJ's WPSL team placed second in the Metropolitan Conference South. After besting MatchFit Academy in the semi-finals, the team lost to the NJ/NY Gotham FC Reserve team in the conference finals.

The club's women's program is coached by Brian Thomsen, the Technical Director of Next Level Soccer Academy in Pennington, NJ. The men's first team inaugural coach was Patrick Snyder, former college and PDA Soccer staff coach. Following the 2021 season, retiring William Patterson men's head coach Brian Woods was named to the clubs USL team top job.

In 2022, the RCNJ WPSL team topped the Mid-Atlantic Conference with a record of 6-1-1. The team secured the title on the last matchday of the season with a 3-2 home victory against Lehigh Valley Tempest, earning the club the duty of hosting the Eastern Region Playoffs. The team lost to VT Fusion in the regional semi-final in kicks from the penalty mark after 120 minutes of scoreless play.

In 2023, the club's USL2 side placed 3rd in the Mid-Atlantic Conference with a 6-6-2 record. Among the season highlights was attacker Stas Korzeniowski's 18 minute hat-trick against Philadelphia Lone Star in the opening match of the season. The club believes this to be the fastest hat-trick in league history.

The RCNJ men's program also participates in the Delaware River Conference of the Eastern Premier Soccer League and fields a team in the Garden State Soccer League.

== Professional Expansion ==
In November 2022 RCNJ and the United Soccer Leagues announced the club would explore professional expansion efforts. According to a joint press release, "The USL League Two side is aiming to bring men's and women's professional soccer to Central Jersey." No additional details have been publicly released. In April 2024, League One Updater stated a reliable source stated "while the project is active and progressing, it is still in the early stages, indicating a jump in 2026 at the very earliest."

== Year-by-year ==
=== Men's team ===
| Year | Level | League | Reg. season | Playoffs | U.S. Open Cup |
|---|---|---|---|---|---|
| 2021 | 4 | USL League Two | 7th, Mid Atlantic Div. | did not qualify | did not qualify |
| 2021-2022 | 5 | Eastern Premier Soccer League | 3rd, Delaware River Conf | qualified | |
| 2022 | 4 | USL League Two | 3rd, Mid Atlantic Div. | did not qualify | did not qualify |
| 2022-2023 | 5 | Eastern Premier Soccer League | 5th, Delaware River Conf | | Lost to Jackson Lions in first qualifying round |
| 2023 | 4 | USL League Two | 3rd, Mid Atlantic Div. | did not qualify | did not qualify |
| 2023-2024 | 5 | Eastern Premier Soccer League | 6th, Delaware River Conf | | Lost to United German Hungarians in first qualifying round |
| 2024 | 4 | USL League Two | 4th, Mid Atlantic Div. | did not qualify | did not qualify |
| 2024-2025 | 5 | Eastern Premier Soccer League | 9th, Delaware River Conf | | did not participate |
| 2025 | 4 | USL League Two | 4th, Mid Atlantic Div. | did not qualify | did not qualify |
| 2024-2025 | 5 | Eastern Premier Soccer League | 9th, Delaware River Conf | | Lost to Scots-American Athletic Club in 1st Qualifying Round |
| 2026 | 4 | USL League Two | 5th, Mid Atlantic Div. | did not qualify | did not qualify |
| 2027 | 4 | | | | Lost to FC Monmouth in 2nd Qualifying Round |

=== Women's team ===
| Year | Level | League | Reg. season | Playoffs |
|---|---|---|---|---|
| 2021 | 4 | Women's Premier Soccer League | 2nd, Metro Conf. South | Conf. Finalist |
| 2022 | 4 | Women's Premier Soccer League | 1st, Mid-Atlantic Conference | Lost in first round PKs |
| 2023 | 4 | Women's Premier Soccer League | 3rd, Keystone Div. | did not qualify |
| 2024 | 4 | Women's Premier Soccer League | 3rd, Colonial Div. | did not qualify |
| 2025 | 4 | Women's Premier Soccer League | 6th, Colonial Div. | did not qualify |
| 2026 | 4 | Women's Premier Soccer League | 4th, Colonial Div. | did not qualify |
