= Khyah Harper =

American soccer player (born 2002)

- Harper with the Houston Dash in 2026

Personal information
- Full name: Khyah Lynn Harper
- Date of birth: August 15, 2002 (age 24)
- Place of birth: Lino Lakes, Minnesota, U.S.
- Height: 5 ft 5 in (1.65 m)
- Position: Forward

Team information
- Current team: Houston Dash
- Number: 34

Youth career
- 2015–2020: Minnesota Thunder
- 2016–2017: North Branch Vikings
- 2018–2020: Centennial Cougars

College career
Years	Team	Apps	(Gls)
2021–2024	Minnesota Golden Gophers	68	(20)

Senior career*
Years	Team	Apps	(Gls)
2023–2024	Salvo FC	–	(16)
2025–	Gotham FC	17	(1)
2026–	Houston Dash	14	(0)
- * Club domestic league appearances and goals as of 03:13, November 8, 2026 (UTC)

Khyah Lynn Harper (born August 15, 2002) is an American professional soccer player who plays as a forward for the Houston Dash of the National Women's Soccer League (NWSL). She played college soccer for the Minnesota Golden Gophers and was named the Big Ten Forward of the Year in 2024. She began her professional career with Gotham FC in 2025, winning the NWSL Championship in her rookie season.

== Early life ==
Harper was born and raised in Lino Lakes, Minnesota. She played multiple sports growing up, including softball, baseball, track, and dance, but she had the most passion for soccer. She committed to play college soccer for Minnesota before her freshman year. After two years at North Branch Area High School, she transferred to Centennial High School, helping the soccer team reach the state championship game in her junior year. In her senior year, she scored 26 goals with 10 assists and was named the Minnesota Star Tribune Metro Player of the Year and the Minnesota Gatorade Player of the Year. She finished her high school career with 134 goals and 71 assists across five seasons. She played club soccer at the Minnesota Thunder Academy, earning ECNL All-American honors in 2018.

== College career ==
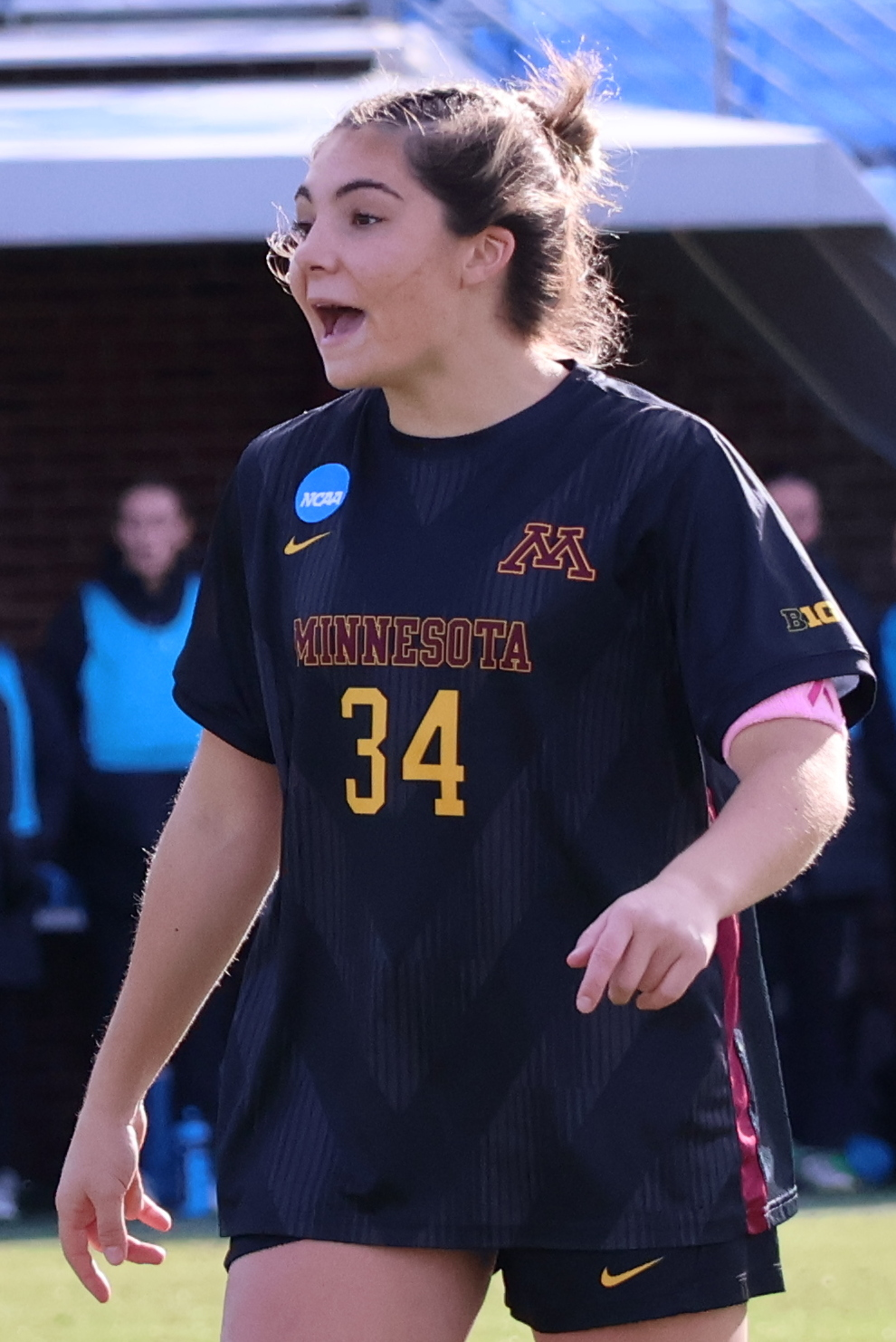
Harper playing for Minnesota in 2024

Harper battled injuries during her first three seasons with the Minnesota Golden Gophers, going through surgeries for both ankles and the meniscus of one of her knees. Leading up to her senior year in 2024, she spent the summer with Women's Premier Soccer League (WPSL) club Salvo SC and won the Golden Boot after leading the league with 16 goals. She had a strong start to her senior season with the Golden Gophers, scoring two hat tricks within the first three games. She finished her breakout season with 17 goals in 22 games (ranking second in the nation in the regular season). Minnesota earned their first NCAA tournament berth in six years and reached the third round, losing to eventual champions North Carolina. Harper was named the Big Ten Forward of the Year, first-team All-Big Ten, and second-team All-American by United Soccer Coaches.

== Club career ==
=== Gotham FC ===
Gotham FC announced on January 8, 2025, that they had signed Harper to her first professional contract on a one-year deal. She made her professional debut on March 23, coming on as a second-half substitute for Sarah Schupansky in a 2–0 loss against the Orlando Pride in the home opener. On August 1, in her first start, she scored her first professional goal with a diving header from Sarah Schupansky's cross in a 1–1 draw with the Chicago Stars. In the CONCACAF W Champions Cup, she started every match in the group stage as Gotham progressed to the semifinals, scoring in a 2–1 win over Monterrey.

On September 19, 2025, Harper signed a one-year contract extension with Gotham through 2026. She finished her rookie season as an unused substitute in the playoffs as Gotham won their second NWSL Championship over the Washington Spirit. On February 1, 2026, she scored Gotham's first goal of the year in the 4–0 win over AS FAR for third place at the inaugural FIFA Women's Champions Cup. During a year and a half with the club, she made 25 appearances and scored 3 goals in all competitions.

=== Houston Dash ===
On July 28, 2026, Harper was traded to the Houston Dash on a free transfer from Gotham.

== Personal life ==
Harper is the daughter of Desiree and Brett Harper. Her father played college football at Wisconsin–La Crosse, and her older sister Sadie played soccer alongside Harper throughout high school and college. She is a cousin of ice hockey player Hunter Miska.

== Honors and awards ==
Gotham FC

- NWSL Championship: 2025
- NWSL Challenge Cup: 2026
- CONCACAF W Champions Cup: 2024–25

Individual

- Second-team All-American: 2024
- First-team All-Big Ten: 2024
- Big Ten Forward of the Year: 2024
- WPSL Golden Boot: 2024
