= Oklahoma City FC (WPSL) =

- Full name: Oklahoma City Football Club
- Founded: 2007
- Stadium: Mustang High School
- Owner: Sean Jones and Sold Out Strategies
- Co-Head Coaches: Niall Crick, Danny Gibson
- League: Women's Premier Soccer League

Oklahoma City FC is an American women's soccer team, founded in 2007. The team is a member of the Women's Premier Soccer League.

The team plays its home games at Mustang High School in Mustang, Oklahoma.

== Seasons ==
As of July 3, 2026

Year	League	Reg. season	Playoffs
2013	WPSL	4th, South Division	DNQ
2014	WPSL		Regional Finals
2015	WPSL	1st, Big Sky	National Semifinals
2016	WPSL		
2017	WPSL		
2018	WPSL	2nd, Red River	
2019	WPSL	4th, Red River - North	DNQ
2020	WPSL	Season cancelled due to COVID-19	
2021	WPSL	2nd, Group I	DNQ
2022	WPSL	4th, Group J	DNQ
2023	WPSL	4th, Red River	DNQ
2024	WPSL	3rd, Heartland	DNQ
2025	WPSL	1st, Heartland	Region Finals
2026	WPSL	2nd, Heartland	DNQ
