= Sioux Falls City FC =

Sioux Falls City F.C.
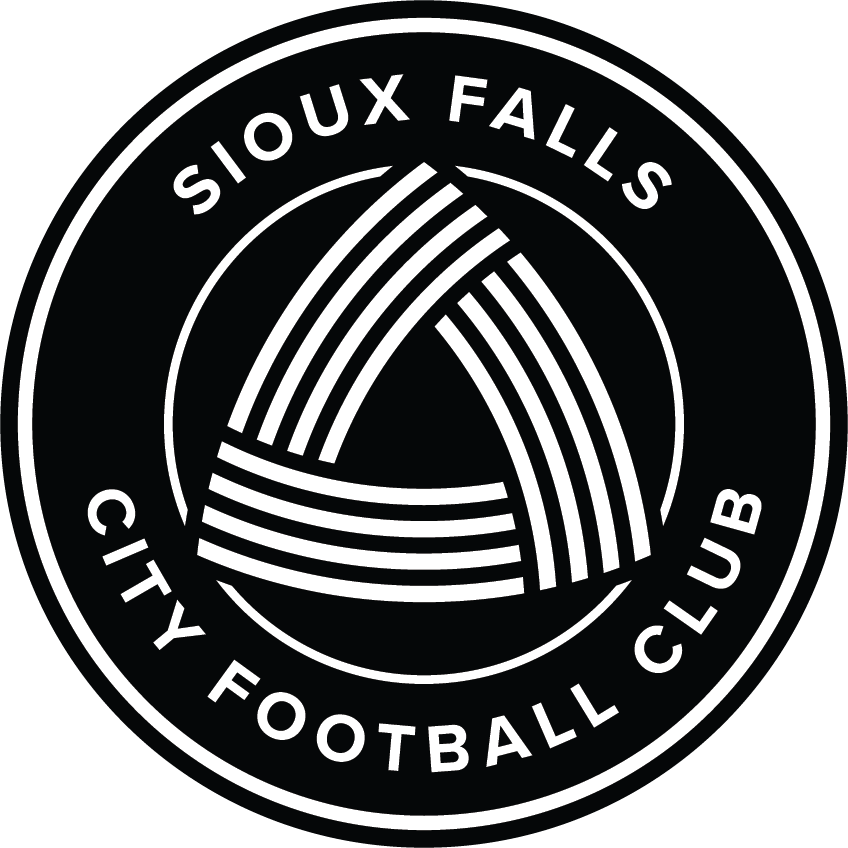
- Full name: Sioux Falls City Football Club
- Founded: January 27, 2022; 4 years ago
- Ground: Bob Young Field, Sioux Falls
- Capacity: 5,000
- Coordinates: 43°29′15″N 96°42′20″W
- Owner(s): Eric & Emily Thomas
- CEO: Sherri Meyers
- Coach: Joe DeMay, Dale Weiler, Taylor Machacek, Hailee Fischer
- League: Women's Premier Soccer League
- 2023: Northern Conference, 3rd of 10
- Website: http://www.siouxfallscityfc.com
Home colors	Away colors

Sioux Falls City Football Club is an American women's soccer team, founded in 2022. The team is a member of the Women's Premier Soccer League, the second tier of women's soccer in the United States and Canada.

== History ==
=== Season-by-Season Record ===
Year	Regular season								Position			Postseason
Year	Division	P	W	L	T	GF	GA	Pts	Div.	Conf.	Leag.	WPSL
2022	Women's Premier Soccer League	8	4	3	1	15	13	13	4th	T-14th	T-55st	Did not qualify
2023	Women's Premier Soccer League	9	6	1	2	15	5	20	3rd	9th	26th	Did not qualify
2024	Women's Premier Soccer League	9	9	0	0	32	1	27	1st	1st	3rd	Region Semifinals
2025	USL W League	12	8	1	3	32	12	25	2nd	–	–	did not qualify
2026	USL W League	12	5	2	5	20	16	17	4th	–	–	did not qualify

== Team ==
=== Current roster ===
Note: Flags indicate national team as defined under FIFA eligibility rules; some limited exceptions apply. Players may hold more than one non-FIFA nationality.

No.	Pos.	Nation	Player
0	GK	COL	Michelle Granja
2	DF	USA	Mo Malone
3	FW	USA	Avery Clark
4	DF	NED	Megan Lampe
5	MF	USA	Aftyn Murray
6	MF	CAN	Mia Bosch
7	MF	USA	Taylor Thomas
9	MF	USA	Lindsey DeHaven
10	MF	GER	Katharina Oelschlaeger
11	FW	USA	Hailee Christensen
12	FW	USA	Lulu Moreno
13	FW	USA	Stella Spitzer
14	FW	USA	Keyera Harmon
15	DF	BRA	Isabella Boccia

No.	Pos.	Nation	Player
16	MF	USA	McKenna Lehman
17	FW	USA	Kaydence Ramirez
18	GK	USA	Cambell Fischer
19	MF	JPN	Yui Fujii
20	DF	USA	Tyreese Zacher
21	FW	USA	Mia Mullenmeister
22	DF	USA	Eli Olsen
24	FW	USA	Ellie Schock
25	DF	SUI	Rebecca Storr
26	FW	USA	Erin Flurey
27	DF	USA	Jordan Tenpas
30	DF	USA	Morgan Rhodes
31	MF	USA	Mali Van Meeteren
32	GK	USA	Cassidy Jennings

== Player records ==
=== Top Points Leaders ===
Leading Career Point Scorers
#	Name	Career	Goals	Assists	Total
1	(Germany) Katharina Oelschlaeger	2024	8	1	17
2	(United States) Mia Mullenmeister	2024	7	2	16
3	(United States) Hailee Christensen	2024	5	2	12
T4	(Japan) Yui Fujii	2024	4	0	8
T4	(United States) Kaylie Rock	2023	4	0	8
T4	(United States) Kirsten Wetterstrom	2022–23	4	0	8
7	(United States) Jozy Bardsley	2022-23	2	3	7
T8	(United States) Kaydence Ramirez	2024	3	0	6
T8	(United States) Anna Bondy	2022	2	2	6
T8	(United States) Rylee Haldeman	2023	2	2	6

Bold Signifies a Current City Player

== Honors ==
- WPSL Franchise of the Year (Northern Conference)
  - 2022
  - 2023
  - 2024
- WPSL Coach of the Year (Northern Conference)
  - 2024; Joe DeMay
- WPSL Offensive Player of the Year (Northern Conference)
  - 2024; Mia Mullenmeister
- WPSL Defensive Player of the Year (Northern Conference)
  - 2024; Cambell Fischer
- WPSL All-Conference Best XI (Northern Conference)
  - 2022; Hailee Fischer, Hattie Giblin, Shyanne Reid
  - 2023; Taylor Thomas
  - 2024; Cambell Fischer, Mia Mullenseister, Katharina Oelschlaeger, Jordan Tenpas
- WPSL Postseason All-Region Best XI (Central Region)
  - 2024; Mail Van Meeteren, Rebecca Storr
- WPSL Photography of the Year (Central Region)
  - 2022
