= Jalen Tompkins =

American soccer player (born 1997)

Personal information
- Full name: Jalen Justine Tompkins
- Date of birth: December 14, 1997 (age 28)
- Place of birth: Phoenix, Arizona, U.S.
- Height: 5 ft 7 in (1.70 m)
- Position: Goalkeeper

Team information
- Current team: Brøndby
- Number: 32

Youth career
- Sereno SC
- 2013–2015: Pinnacle Pioneers

College career
Years	Team	Apps	(Gls)
2015–2019	Colorado Buffaloes	85	(0)

Senior career*
Years	Team	Apps	(Gls)
2020–2024	Vålerenga	44	(0)
2025–	Brøndby	42	(0)

International career
2012	United States U-15		
2013	United States U-16		
2014	United States U-17		
- * Club domestic league appearances and goals as of September 26, 2026

Jalen Justine "JJ" Tompkins (born December 14, 1997) is an American professional soccer player who plays as a goalkeeper for Danish A-Liga club Brøndby. She played college soccer for the Colorado Buffaloes. She began her professional career with Norwegian club Vålerenga in 2020, winning three league championships in five seasons.

== Early life ==
Tompkins was born in Phoenix, Arizona, to James Tompkins and Kelly Johnson. She began playing soccer at age four in the footsteps of her older brother. She played club soccer for Sereno SC, winning the ECNL under-16 national title and being named in the tournament's Best XI in 2013. She helped lead Pinnacle High School to the AIA Division I state championship in her junior year in 2014, allowing zero goals during the state playoffs and earning all-state honors. She committed to play college soccer for the Colorado Buffaloes during her sophomore year.

== College career ==
Tompkins redshirted her freshman season with the Colorado Buffaloes in 2015, serving as the third-stringer behind starter Kate Scheele and backup Scout Watson. In 2016, after an injury to Watson, Tompkins gained the starting job and had a strong redshirt freshman season. She started 20 matches and kept 7 solo clean sheets, receiving Pac-12 Conference all-freshman and TopDrawerSoccer second-team Freshman Best XI honors, while helping the Buffaloes place second in the Pac-12. She was named co-captain alongside Watson as a sophomore in 2017. She started all 22 games and kept 9 solo clean sheets, setting multiple program single-season records including 0.58 goals against average and .882 save percentage, and was named third-team All-Pac-12. She contributed to 7 shutouts from 18 starts as a junior in 2018, again earning third-team All-Pac-12 honors. She started all 22 games and kept 8 clean sheets in her senior year in 2019, receiving second-team All-Pac-12 honors and helping the Buffaloes to their third NCAA tournament appearance in four seasons. She left Colorado as the program leader in career saves, save percentage, and goalkeeper wins, appearances, and starts, and ranked second in goals against average.

== Club career ==
=== Vålerenga ===
Tompkins was eligible for the 2020 NWSL College Draft but was ultimately not selected. On February 18, 2020, after impressing on trial, she signed her first professional contract with Norwegian club Vålerenga. She competed for the starting job with compatriot Hannah Seabert, serving as backup for the first seven games before taking over for the rest of the season. She made her professional debut in a 0–0 draw with Rosenborg on August 16. The following week, she helped Vålerenga win 3–1 against defending champions LSK, their first league victory over the Lillestrøm side. She kept six clean sheets in her first seven appearances. On November 19, she made her continental debut in the Champions League qualifying match against Lithuanian side Gintra, which Vålerenga won 7–0 to reach the round of 32. She finished her rookie season leading Vålerenga to their first league championship, ending a six-year reign by LSK. She also helped Vålerenga claim their first national cup, winning 2–0 against LSK in the final in extra time. She was named in the Toppserien Team of the Year by her fellow players.

On September 9, 2021, Tompkins signed a two-year contract extension with Vålerenga. She missed the last few months of the year due to a shoulder injury. Working her way back, she began the next season as the backup to Guro Pettersen. On May 18, 2022, she returned from the injury in Vålerenga's opening cup game, her first appearance in almost eight months. On June 12, she made her league return in a 4–0 win against Røa. Starting on August 20, she regained the starting job for the rest of the season and kept four clean sheets in her last five games as Vålerenga were league runners-up.

On May 27, 2023, Tompkins sustained a knee injury during the game against Rosenborg and was ruled out indefinitely with suspected damage to her posterior cruciate ligament (PCL). On September 13, after three and a half months out, she returned from the injury in a 2–2 draw with LSK, and she remained first-choice for the rest of the year. The next month, she started both Champions League qualifying matches against Real Madrid, but Vålerenga were eliminated by the Spanish side. She finished the season helping Vålerenga win their second league championship, clinching the title after a 3–1 win over Stabæk as challengers LSK and Rosenborg drew 1–1. At the end of the season, she signed a two-year contract extension with the club.

Tompkins spent the next season as the backup to new signing Tove Enblom. On April 27, 2024, she made her first appearance of the year, starting in a 3–1 win over Lyn. On August 19, she suffered a forearm tendon injury in training and was ruled out for three months. She did not make any more appearances for Vålerenga after the injury, but she made the bench for the cup final as the league champions completed their second domestic double. During five years at Vålerenga, she made 58 appearances in all competitions and won six trophies – three league titles and three cup titles.

=== Brøndby ===
On January 9, 2025, Tompkins transferred to Danish club Brøndby after five years in Norway. She debuted for the club on March 8, starting in a 1–0 victory over AGF in the Danish Women's Cup. She made her league debut the following week in a 3–1 defeat to HB Køge and started every remaining match as Brøndby placed fourth in the league.

On October 19, 2025, Tompkins recorded her first professional assist in a 3–0 win over AGF, setting up the final goal by Emilie Fink. Over the winter break, she signed a contract extension with Brøndby. Starting all 24 league fixtures, she led the league with 14 clean sheets as she helped Brøndby finish runner-up to HB Køge.

On August 5, 2026, Tompkins made her continental debut for Brøndby in a 2–0 defeat to Dutch side Ajax in Champions League qualifying. Three days later, she stopped a penalty from Czech side Slavia Prague in a 5–3 shootout victory after a 1–1 draw, starting Brøndby's successful Europa Cup qualifying campaign.

== Honors and awards ==
Vålerenga

- Toppserien: 2020, 2023, 2024
- Norwegian Women's Cup: 2020, 2021, 2024

Individual

- NISO Toppserien Team of the Year: 2020
- Second-team All-Pac-12: 2019
- Third-team All-Pac-12: 2017, 2018
- Pac-12 all-freshman team: 2016
