= 2021 Norwegian Women's Cup =

Tournament details
- Country: Norway
- Teams: 54

Final positions
- Champions: Vålerenga
- Runners-up: Sandviken

Tournament statistics
- Matches played: 51
- Goals scored: 243 (4.76 per match)
- Top goal scorer(s): Camilla Linberg (7 goals)

The 2021 Norwegian Women's Cup was the 44th season of the Norwegian annual knock-out football tournament. It began on 3 August 2021 and ended with the final on 31 October 2021.

Vålerenga won the competition for the second year in a row after beating Sandviken in the final.

== First round ==
10 teams from 1. divisjon and 34 teams from 2. divisjon entered the first round. All Toppserien teams received a bye in this round.

Team 1	Score	Team 2
3 August 2021
Træff	0–8	KIL/Hemne
4 August 2021
Grand Bodø	w/o	Bossmo/Ytt.
Frigg	1–0	Grei
Høybråten og Stovner	0–7	Røa
Raufoss	2–3	Kongsvinger
Hallingdal	2–6	Hønefoss
Eik Tønsberg	1–6	Fart
Stathelle	1–2	Snøgg
Bryne	3–1	Staal Jørpeland
Viking	2–0	Haugar
Fyllingsdalen	6–0	Stord
Kaupanger	1–4	Åsane
Hødd	1–5	AaFK Fortuna
Innstranda	w/o	Øvrevoll Hosle
Sarpsborg 08	0–2	Ull/Kisa
Nanset	5–2	Sandefjord
Gimletroll	1–4	Amazon Grimstad
Molde	6–2	Herd
Mjølner	1–7	Medkila
Tromsdalen	0–3	Fløya
Porsanger	1–3	Bossekop
5 August 2021
Nardo	0–3	Byåsen

== Second round ==
The second round consists of 10 teams from Toppserien, 9 teams from 1. divisjon and 13 teams from 2. divisjon.

Team 1	Score	Team 2
10 August 2021
Nanset	0–12	Stabæk
11 August 2021
Frigg	0–4	Røa
Ull/Kisa	0–6	Vålerenga
Fart	2–5	Hønefoss
Kongsvinger	0–9	LSK Kvinner
Snøgg	0–8	Kolbotn
Amazon Grimstad	1–0	Øvrevoll Hosle
Bryne	1–4	Avaldsnes
Viking	0–3	Klepp
Fyllingsdalen	0–3	Arna-Bjørnar
Åsane	0–2	Sandviken
KIL/Hemne	3–1	Molde
Byåsen	0–7	Rosenborg
Medkila	0–2	Grand Bodø
AaFK Fortuna	4–1	Lyn
17 August 2021
Bossekop	0–3	Fløya

== Third round ==
The draw for the third round was made on 13 August 2021.

24 August 2021	Hønefoss	0–12	Vålerenga	Hønefoss
18:00 CEST (UTC+2)		Report	Nielsen 9', 41'; Markussen 14'; Thomsen 46'; Stengel 54', 59'; Jensen 69', 78', 81'; Thorsnes 76', 84', 90+1'	Stadium: Aka Arena; Attendance: 326; Referee: Sarah Fatemeh Zangeneh

24 August 2021	AaFK Fortuna	0–3	Sandviken	Ålesund
18:00 CEST (UTC+2)		Report	Hasund 17', 90+3'; Cordner 90+1'	Stadium: Aksla Stadion; Attendance: 440; Referee: Even Myrheim

25 August 2021	Fløya	2–0	Stabæk	Tromsø
15:00 CEST (UTC+2)	Trøan 12' (pen.); Bergvoll 28'	Report		Stadium: Fløya Arena; Referee: Stine Margrete Jensen

25 August 2021	Røa	0–1	Kolbotn	Oslo
18:00 CEST (UTC+2)		Report	Nelhage 78'	Stadium: Røabanen; Attendance: 153; Referee: Martin Bolstad

25 August 2021	Avaldsnes	4–0	Arna-Bjørnar	Avaldsnes
18:00 CEST (UTC+2)	Jøsendal 29', 39'; Sævik 33'; Tvedten 71'	Report		Stadium: Avaldsnes Idrettssenter; Attendance: 140; Referee: Karoline Marie Jensen

25 August 2021	KIL/Hemne	0–4	Rosenborg	Kyrksæterøra
18:00 CEST (UTC+2)		Report	Blakstad 21', 24'; Leine 62'; Brønstad 71'	Stadium: Hemne Sparebank Arena; Attendance: 150; Referee: Veronika Fjeldvær

25 August 2021	Grand Bodø	2–9	LSK Kvinner	Bodø
19:00 CEST (UTC+2)	T. Jensen 24'; S. Jensen 72'	Report	Authen 7'; Lie 17'; Kyvåg 22'; Haavi 29', 59'; Linberg 41', 55', 61'; Löfwenius 61'	Stadium: Nordlandshallen; Attendance: 142; Referee: Cecilie Frøyland

8 September 2021	Klepp	2–0	Amazon Grimstad	Kleppe
18:00 CEST (UTC+2)	Aspenes 46' (o.g.); Maksuti 75'	Report		Stadium: Klepp Stadion; Attendance: 80; Referee: Amir Ajjour
Note: The match was scheduled to be played on 25 August, but was postponed due to COVID-19 infection in one of the teams.

== Quarter-finals ==
The draw for the quarter-finals was made on 26 August 2021.

11 September 2021	Sandviken	1–0	Fløya	Bergen
13:00 CEST (UTC+2)	Lund 6'	Report		Stadium: Stemmemyren Kunstgress; Attendance: 150; Referee: Karoline Marie Jensen

11 September 2021	LSK Kvinner	3–0	Klepp	Lillestrøm
15:00 CEST (UTC+2)	Löfwenius 16', 34'; Woldvik 28'	Report		Stadium: LSK-Hallen; Attendance: 120; Referee: Sarah Fatemeh Zangeneh

11 September 2021	Kolbotn	1–3	Vålerenga	Kolbotn
17:00 CEST (UTC+2)	Pirisi 52'	Report	Stefanović 10', 79'; Tomter 44'	Stadium: Sofiemyr Stadion; Attendance: 104; Referee: Abdulhadi Al-Fahad

12 September 2021	Rosenborg	4–0	Avaldsnes	Trondheim
12:00 CEST (UTC+2)	Olsvik 17'; Utland 79', 86'; Blakstad 83'	Report		Stadium: Koteng Arena; Attendance: 250; Referee: Emilie Rodahl Torkelsen

== Semi-finals ==
The draw for the semi-finals was made on 13 September 2021. The semi-finals were played between the top four teams in the 2021 Toppserien.

2 October 2021	Vålerenga	4–0	Rosenborg	Oslo
15:00 CEST (UTC+2)	Nielsen 3'; Bjelde 21'; Madsen 82'; Markussen 86'	Report		Stadium: Intility Arena; Attendance: 421; Referee: Ingvild Langnes Aarland

3 October 2021	LSK Kvinner	0–2	Sandviken	Lillestrøm
15:15 CEST (UTC+2)		Report	Østenstad 18'; Terland 26'	Stadium: LSK-Hallen; Attendance: 267; Referee: Henrikke Holm Nervik

== Final ==
31 October 2021
15:00 CEST (UTC+2)

Sandviken	1–2	Vålerenga
Lund 50'	Report	Markussen 13'; Stefanović 45+1'

Ullevaal Stadion, Oslo
Attendance: 3,183
Referee: Karoline Marie Jensen

== Top scorers ==
Rank	Player	Club	Goals
1	(Norway) Camilla Linberg	LSK Kvinner	7
2	(Norway) Elise Thorsnes	Vålerenga	5
3	(Norway) Thea Bjelde	Vålerenga	4
3	(Norway) Maiken Bjørndalen	Stabæk	4
3	(Trinidad and Tobago) Anya de Courcy	Røa	4
3	(Netherlands) Kim Dolstra	Medkila	4
3	(Norway) Thea Kyvåg	LSK Kvinner	4
3	(Sweden) Mimmi Löfwenius	LSK Kvinner	4
3	(Norway) Silje Nyhagen	Hønefoss	4
