= Ingrid Engen =

Norwegian footballer (born 1998)

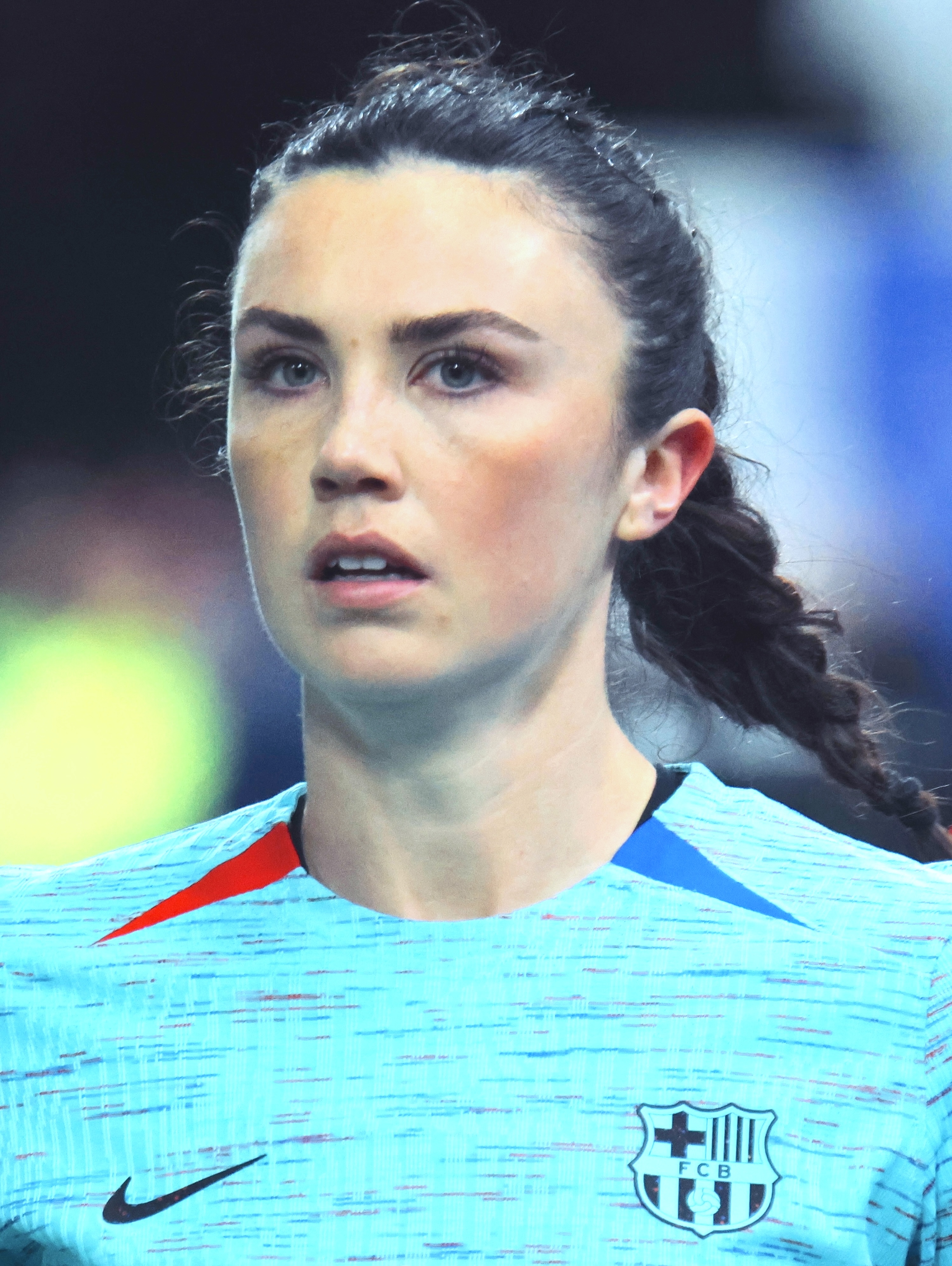
- Syrstad Engen with Barcelona in 2024

Personal information
- Full name: Ingrid Syrstad Engen
- Date of birth: April 29, 1998 (age 28)
- Place of birth: Melhus Municipality, Norway
- Height: 1.77 m (5 ft 10 in)
- Positions: Midfielder; centre-back

Team information
- Current team: OL Lyonnes
- Number: 15

Youth career
- Melhus
- Gimse

Senior career*
Years	Team	Apps	(Gls)
2014–2017	Trondheims-Ørn	62	(2)
2018	LSK Kvinner	22	(2)
2019–2021	VfL Wolfsburg	42	(5)
2019	→ LSK Kvinner (loan)	9	(2)
2021–2025	Barcelona	152	(8)
2025–	OL Lyonnes	11	(1)

International career^{‡}
2013	Norway U15	4	(0)
2014	Norway U16	3	(1)
2014–2015	Norway U17	10	(0)
2015–2017	Norway U19	24	(1)
2017	Norway U23	4	(0)
2018–	Norway	100	(6)
- * Club domestic league appearances and goals as of 7 June 2025 ‡ National team caps and goals as of 14 October 2026

Ingrid Syrstad Engen (born 29 April 1998) is a Norwegian professional footballer who plays as a defensive midfielder for French Première Ligue club OL Lyonnes and the Norway national team. She previously played for Trondheims-Ørn and LSK Kvinner in Norway, Wolfsburg in Germany and Barcelona in Spain before joining OL Lyonnes in 2025.

== Club career ==
Engen began her senior career with Trondheims-Ørn. Initially on the under-19 team in the second division, she joined the first team in the Toppserien in June 2014. After the 2016 Toppserien she rejected approaches from other clubs to extend her contract with Trondheims-Ørn.

After moving to LSK Kvinner and helping them secure a League and Cup double, she signed for German champions VfL Wolfsburg in December 2018. As part of the deal she agreed a return to LSK on loan for the first half of the 2019 season. She also played for Lillestrøm for the first time in the 2018–19 Champions League. With Wolfsburg, she won the double in her debut season and reached the Champions League final, but lost to defending champions Lyon. She scored her first two Champions League goals in a 9–1 quarter-final win over Glasgow City F.C.

On 6 July 2021, she signed a two-year deal with Barcelona, keeping her for the club until 30 June 2023. On 25 September, she made her debut for the club in a 8–0 win over Valencia. In January 2023, Engen extended her contract with Barcelona until June 2025. She had not had much prominence in her first two seasons with the club, taking time to adapt to Barcelona's particular number 6 role; in the 2023–24 season, she was moved to the central defense when ball-playing centre-back Mapi León suffered a season-ending injury in December. Having only sporadically played in the back line for Norway before, she quickly thrived in this new role and became a fundamental piece of Barcelona's formation there.

On 20 June 2025, Engen signed a two-year contract with Première Ligue club OL Lyonnes.

== International career ==
Engen took part in the U-17 European Championship in June 2015, but was eliminated in the group stage. A year later, she took part in the U-19 European Championship in Slovakia in 2016, but was eliminated there as third in the group. She then took part in the two qualifying rounds for the 2017 U-19 European Championship, but the Norwegians were unable to qualify. After that she played four more games with the U-23 team

Engen was included in the Norway team in its debut for the 2018 Algarve Cup. She got her debut cap when Australia defeated Norway in its opening match, in Albufeira, 4–3. She was substituted on in the second half when the score was 1:3. Two days later, she started the 2–0 win against China and scored the first goal. She was then in the game for 7th place in the starting XI. After that she played in five qualifiers for the 2019 World Cup. She scored the first goal in the 2–1 victory in the last and crucial game to win the group against European champions Netherlands. She was praised by team coach Martin Sjögren: "She is only 20 years old but appears to have played international football for 10 years".

She was used in the next games and achieved her first tournament success at the 2019 Algarve Cup. On 2 May, she was nominated for the 2019 World Cup. At the World Cup, she played in Norway's five games. A 3–0 defeat by England in the quarter-finals saw her and her team eliminated, also missing out on the 2020 Olympics.

In qualifying for the Euro 2022 Engen was used in all six games of the Norwegians and scored three goals. She appeared in the first six matches of 2023 World Cup qualifying, scoring one goal and captaining the two games in November 2021.

On 7 June 2022, she was nominated for the European Championship finals. She was used in the three group games that began with a 4–1 win against Euro newcomers Northern Ireland. They then suffered the heaviest defeat in their international history against England, 8–0. Third in their group, they missed out on the knockout rounds with a 1–0 defeat, their first ever against Austria.

Engen played in the first game after the Euro, the crucial match to win the qualifying group for the 2023 World Cup, against Belgium, which they won 1–0 to qualify Norway for the World Cup.

On 19 June 2023, she was included in the 23-player Norwegian squad for the FIFA World Cup 2023.

On 16 June 2025, Engen was called up to the Norway squad for the UEFA Euro 2025.

== Style of play ==
Engen's play is characterised as a possession-based, defensive-focused midfielder who operates in deeper areas of the pitch. She has good passing skills, but her play is best when stopping counter-attacks and holding possession. She can also play as a centre-back and is reliable for aerial duels.

== Personal life ==
Engen was previously in a relationship with fellow Norway international player Marie Dølvik Markussen.

As of May 2026, she is in a relationship, which began in 2021, with former Barcelona teammate and Spanish international Mapi León.

== Career statistics ==
=== Club ===
As of 15 March 2026

Appearances and goals by club, season and competition
Club	Season	League			Cup		Other		UWCL		Total	
Club	Season	Division	Apps	Goals	Apps	Goals	Apps	Goals	Apps	Goals	Apps	Goals
Trondheims-Ørn	2014	Toppserien	3	0	1 (Note: Appearances in Norwegian Women's Cup)	0	–		–		4	0
Trondheims-Ørn	2015	Toppserien	16	1	3	0	–		–		19	1
Trondheims-Ørn	2016	Toppserien	21	1	3	1	–		–		24	2
Trondheims-Ørn	2017	Toppserien	22	0	2	1	–		–		24	1
Trondheims-Ørn	Total		62	2	9	2	–		–		71	4
LSK Kvinner	2018	Toppserien	22	2	4	1	–		4	0	30	3
LSK Kvinner (loan)	2019	Toppserien	9	2	1	0	–		2	0	12	2
LSK Kvinner (loan)	Total		31	4	5	1	–		6	0	42	5
VfL Wolfsburg	2019–20	Frauen-Bundesliga	21	3	4 (Note: Appearances in DFB-Pokal)	0	–		7	2	32	5
VfL Wolfsburg	2020–21	Frauen-Bundesliga	21	2	5	0	–		6	1	32	3
VfL Wolfsburg	Total		42	5	9	0	–		13	3	64	8
Barcelona	2021–22	Primera División	23	2	4 (Note: Appearances in Copa de la Reina)	0	2 (Note: Appearances in Supercopa de España)	1	9	1	38	4
Barcelona	2022–23	Primera División	21	2	0	0	0	0	11	0	32	2
Barcelona	2023–24	Primera División	22	0	5	0	2	0	11	0	40	0
Barcelona	2024–25	Primera División	25	1	5	0	0	0	10	0	40	1
Barcelona	Total		91	5	14	0	4	1	41	1	150	7
Lyon	2025–26	D1F	11	1	0 (Note: Appearances in Coupe de France Féminine)	0	0 (Note: Appearances in Trophée des Championnes)	0	5	0	5	0
Career total			237	17	37	3	4	1	70	4	348	25

=== International ===
As of match played 2 July 2025

Appearances and goals by national team and year
National team	Year	Apps	Goals
Norway	2018	9	2
Norway	2019	17	3
Norway	2020	5	0
Norway	2021	10	1
Norway	2022	16	0
Norway	2023	12	0
Norway	2024	11	0
Norway	2025	7	0
Total		87	6

Scores and results list Norway's goal tally first, score column indicates score after each Engen goal.

List of international goals scored by Ingrid Syrstad Engen
No.	Date	Venue	Opponent	Score	Result	Competition
1	2 March 2018	VRSA Sports Complex, Vila Real de Santo António, Portugal	China	1–0	2–0	2018 Algarve Cup
2	4 September 2018	Intility Arena, Oslo, Norway	Netherlands	1–0	2–1	2019 FIFA Women's World Cup qualification
3	8 October 2019	Tórsvøllur, Tórshavn, Faroe Islands	Faroe Islands	8–0	13–0	2022 UEFA Women's Euro qualification
4	8 October 2019	Tórsvøllur, Tórshavn, Faroe Islands	Faroe Islands	11–0	13–0	2022 UEFA Women's Euro qualification
5	8 November 2019	Viking Stadion, Stavanger, Norway	Northern Ireland	4–0	6–0	2022 UEFA Women's Euro qualification
6	30 November 2021	Yerevan Football Academy Stadium, Yerevan, Armenia	Armenia	10–0	10–0	2023 FIFA Women's World Cup qualification

== Honours ==
LSK Kvinner

- Toppserien: 2018
- Norwegian Women's Cup: 2018

VfL Wolfsburg

- Frauen-Bundesliga: 2019–20
- DFB-Pokal Frauen: 2019–20, 2020–21

FC Barcelona

- Primera División: 2021–22, 2022–23, 2023–24, 2024–25
- Copa de la Reina: 2021–22, 2023–24, 2024–25
- Supercopa de España Femenina: 2021–22, 2023–24
- UEFA Women's Champions League: 2022–23, 2023–24

Lyon

- Première Ligue: 2025–26
- Coupe de France Féminine: 2025–26
- Coupe LFFP: 2025–26

Norway

- Algarve Cup: 2019
