= 2014 UEFA Women's Under-19 Championship =

U19-EM i fotball for kvinner 2014

Tournament details
- Host country: Norway
- Dates: 15–27 July
- Teams: 8
- Venue: 6 (in 6 host cities)

Final positions
- Champions: Netherlands (1st title)
- Runners-up: Spain

Tournament statistics
- Matches played: 15
- Goals scored: 36 (2.4 per match)
- Top scorer(s): (Netherlands) Vivianne Miedema (6 goals)
- Best player: (Netherlands) Vivianne Miedema

The UEFA Women's Under-19 Championship 2014 Final Tournament was held in Norway from 15 to 27 July 2014. The first qualification matches were played on 21 September 2013.

A competition record of 48 participating nations was set. For the first time Albania, Malta and Montenegro enter the competition.

The Netherlands won the final over Spain 1–0.

== Tournament structure ==
The regulations make up for the following tournament structure:

	Teams entering in this round	Teams advancing from previous round	Competition format
First qualifying round (44 teams)	44 teams from associations ranked 4–53		11 groups of 4 teams, hosted by one nation, seeded into four pots by UEFA coefficient
Second qualifying round (24 teams)	Germany; England; Spain	11 group winners from 1st qualifying round; 10 best runners-up from 1st qualifying round	6 groups of 4 teams, hosted by one nation, seeded into four pots by UEFA coefficient
Final tournament (8 teams)	Norway (hosts)	6 group winners from 2nd qualifying round; best group runners-up from 2nd qualifying round	2 groups of 4 teams, semi-finals, final

== Venues ==
The matches were played in six cities, Ullevaal National Stadium was the final venue.

- Ullevaal Stadion, Oslo (28,000)
- Sarpsborg Stadion, Sarpsborg (4,700)
- Tønsberg Gressbane, Tønsberg (3,600)
- Mjøndalen Arena, Mjøndalen (2,100)
- Strømmen Stadion, Strømmen (1,800)
- UKI Arena, Jessheim (1,200)

== Squads ==
Each national team have to submit a squad of 18 players.

== Qualification ==
There were two separate rounds of qualifications held before the final tournament.

=== Qualifying round ===
In the qualifying round 44 teams were drawn into 11 groups. The group winners and ten best runners-up of each group advance. The draw was held on 20 November 2012.

=== Elite round ===
In the elite round the 21 teams from the first qualifying round were joined by top seeds Germany, England and Spain. The 24 teams of this round were drawn into six groups of four teams. The group winners and the runners-up team with the best record against the sides first and third in their group advanced to the final tournament.

=== Qualified teams ===
The following teams qualified for the final tournament.

Team	Method of qualification	Appearance	Last appearance	Previous best performance
Norway	Hosts	11th	2013 (Group stage)	Runners-up (2001, 2003, 2008, 2011)
Spain	Elite round Group 1 winners	11th	2012 (Runners-up)	Champions (2004)
Scotland	Elite round Group 2 winners	4th	2010 (Group stage)	Group stage (2005, 2008, 2010)
Sweden	Elite round Group 3 winners	10th	2013 (Group stage)	Champions (1999, 2012)
Belgium	Elite round Group 4 winners	3rd	2011 (Group stage)	Group stage (2006, 2011)
Netherlands	Elite round Group 5 winners	5th	2011 (Group stage)	Semi-finals (2010)
England	Elite round Group 6 winners	9th	2013 (Runners-up)	Champions (2009)
Republic of Ireland	Highest ranked 2nd place team	1st	Debut	

== Group stage ==
The seven teams advancing from the second qualifying round joined host nation Norway. Ireland qualified as best runners-up. The draw of groups was held on 29 April in Oslo.

The top two teams of each group advance to the semi-finals.

Tie-breaking

If two or more teams were equal on points on completion of the group matches, the following tie-breaking criteria were applied:

1. Higher number of points obtained in the matches played between the teams in question;
2. Superior goal difference resulting from the matches played between the teams in question;
3. Higher number of goals scored in the matches played between the teams in question;

If, after having applied criteria 1 to 3, teams still had an equal ranking, criteria 1 to 3 were reapplied exclusively to the matches between the teams in question to determine their final rankings. If this procedure did not lead to a decision, criteria 4 to 7 were applied.

4. Superior goal difference in all group matches;
5. Higher number of goals scored in all group matches;
6. Respect Fair play ranking of the teams in question (final tournament);
7. Drawing of lots.

If only two teams were tied (according to criteria 1–7) after having met in the last match of the group stage, their ranking would be determined by a penalty shoot-out.

Key to colours in group tables
Group winners and runners-up advanced to the semi-finals

All times are in Central European Summer Time (UTC+02:00).

=== Group A ===
Team	Pld	W	D	L	GF	GA	GD	Pts
Norway	3	2	1	0	7	1	+6	7
Netherlands	3	2	1	0	4	2	+2	7
Scotland	3	1	0	2	4	8	−4	3
Belgium	3	0	0	3	1	5	−4	0

15 July 2014
19:00

Norway	0–0	Netherlands
	Report

Sarpsborg Stadion, Sarpsborg
Referee: Zuzana Kováčová (Slovakia)
15 July 2014
19:00

Belgium	0–2	Scotland
	Report	Weir 10'; Ness 40'

Strømmen Stadion, Strømmen
Referee: Séverine Zinck (France)

18 July 2014
19:00

Norway	2–1	Belgium
Markussen 18'; Hansen 58'	Report	Michez 64'

Tønsberg Gressbane, Tønsberg
Referee: Sofia Karagiorgi (Cyprus)
18 July 2014
19:00

Netherlands	3–2	Scotland
Miedema 9', 24'; O'Neill 19' (o.g.)	Report	Janssen 65' (o.g.); Richardson 70'

UKI Arena, Jessheim
Referee: Karolina Radzik-Johan (Poland)

21 July 2014
19:00

Scotland	0–5	Norway
	Report	Clausen 10'; Naalsund 15'; Skinnes Hansen 34'; Markussen 72'; Jensen 89'

Sarpsborg Stadion, Sarpsborg
Referee: Anastasia Pustovoitova (Russia)
21 July 2014
19:00

Netherlands	1–0	Belgium
Kaagman 41'	Report

Mjøndalen Arena, Mjøndalen
Referee: Marija Kurtes (Germany)

=== Group B ===
Team	Pld	W	D	L	GF	GA	GD	Pts
Republic of Ireland	3	3	0	0	5	2	+3	9
Spain	3	2	0	1	4	1	+3	6
Sweden	3	1	0	2	3	4	−1	3
England	3	0	0	3	1	6	−5	0

15 July 2014
19:00

England	0–2	Sweden
	Report	Bartrip 60' (o.g.); Blackstenius 75'

Tønsberg Gressbane, Tønsberg
Referee: Sofia Karagiorgi (Cyprus)
15 July 2014
19:00

Republic of Ireland	1–0	Spain
Shine 54'	Report

UKI Arena, Jessheim
Referee: Karolina Radzik-Johan (Poland)

18 July 2014
19:00

England	1–2	Republic of Ireland
Walker 36'	Report	McCarthy 57'; Keenan 86'

Mjøndalen Arena, Mjøndalen
Referee: Anastasia Pustovoitova (Russia)
18 July 2014
19:00

Sweden	0–2	Spain
	Report	García 42'; Redondo 79'

Strømmen Stadion, Strømmen
Referee: Marija Kurtes (Germany)

21 July 2014
19:00

Spain	2–0	England
Fraile 58'; García 79'	Report

Strømmen Stadion, Strömmen
Referee: Séverine Zinck (France)
21 July 2014
19:00

Sweden	1–2	Republic of Ireland
Blackstenius 8'	Report	McCarthy 21'; Connolly 80'

UKI Arena, Jessheim
Referee: Zuzana Kovacova (Slovakia)

== Knockout stage ==
In the knockout stage, extra time and penalty shoot-out are used to decide the winner if necessary.

For the first time in the competition history Ireland has reached the semi-finals. Their semi-final against the Netherlands was a rematch of the pairing in the second qualifying round, which ended in a goalless draw. With a 4–0 win the Netherlands reached the final for the first time.

Semi-finals
24 July
Norway	0
Spain	2
24 July
Republic of Ireland	0
Netherlands	4

Final
27 July
Spain	0
Netherlands	1

=== Semifinals ===
24 July 2014
18:00

Norway	0–2	Spain
	Report	Caldentey 71'; Turmo 90+4'

UKI Arena, Jessheim
Referee: Zuzana Kováčová (Slovakia)

24 July 2014
19:00

Republic of Ireland	0–4	Netherlands
	Report	Miedema 5', 48', 55'; Kuijpers 34'

Mjøndalen Arena, Mjøndalen
Referee: Marija Kurtes (Germany)

=== Final ===
27 July 2014
18:00

Spain	0–1	Netherlands
	Report	Miedema 21'

Ullevaal Stadion, Oslo
Referee: Zuzana Kováčová (Slovakia)

Spain	Netherlands

SPAIN:
GK	13	Sara Serrat
DF	2	Celia Jiménez (c)
DF	3	Marta Turmo
DF	4	Garazi Murua
DF	5	Núria Garrote
MF	9	Maitane López
MF	6	Leire Baños	(substituted off) 66'
MF	14	Sonia Fraile
MF	16	Andrea Falcón
FW	8	María Caldentey
FW	12	Nahikari García
Substitutes:
GK	1	Paula Canals
DF	10	Núria Mendoza
DF	18	Paola Soldevila
MF	15	Ainoa Campo
FW	7	María Díaz
FW	11	Sheila Guijarro
FW	17	Alba Redondo	(substituted on) 66'
Manager:
Jorge Vilda

NETHERLANDS:
GK	1	Jennifer Vreugdenhil
DF	3	Dominique Janssen
DF	4	Danique Kerkdijk
DF	5	Danielle Kuikstra	(substituted off) 78'
DF	12	Lucie Akkerman
MF	6	Kim Mourmans
MF	8	Inessa Kaagman (c)
MF	10	Jill Roord	(substituted off) 46'
FW	7	Jeslynn Kuijpers
FW	9	Vivianne Miedema
FW	14	Laura Strik	(substituted off) 61'
Substitutes:
GK	16	Nienke Olthof
DF	2	Cornelia Peels	(substituted on) 78'
DF	15	Lauren Delleman
MF	17	Sharon Bruinenberg	(substituted on) 46'
FW	11	Lineth Beerensteyn
FW	13	Simone Kets	(substituted on) 61'
FW	18	Sisca Folkertsma
Manager:
Andre Koolhof

MATCH OFFICIALS

- Assistant referees:
  - Petra Simmerová (Czech Republic)
  - May Moalem (Israel)
- Fourth official: Marija Kurtes (Germany)

2014 UEFA Women's U-19 European champions

Netherlands
First title

== Goalscorers ==
6 goals

- (Netherlands) Vivianne Miedema

2 goals

- (Norway) Synne Skinnes Hansen
- (Norway) Marie Dølvik Markussen
- (Republic of Ireland) Savannah McCarthy
- (Spain) Nahikari García
- (Sweden) Stina Blackstenius

1 goal

- (Belgium) Lucinda Michez
- (England) Claudia Walker
- (Netherlands) Inessa Kaagman
- (Netherlands) Jeslynn Kuijpers
- (Norway) Marit Clausen
- (Norway) Synne Jensen
- (Norway) Lisa Naalsund
- (Republic of Ireland) Megan Connolly
- (Republic of Ireland) Keeva Keenan
- (Republic of Ireland) Clare Shine
- (Scotland) Zoe Ness
- (Scotland) Carolina Richardson
- (Scotland) Caroline Weir
- (Spain) Mariona Caldentey
- (Spain) Sonia Fraile
- (Spain) Alba Redondo
- (Spain) Marta Turmo

Own goals

- (England) Molly Bartrip (playing against Sweden)
- (Netherlands) Dominique Janssen (playing against Scotland)
- (Scotland) Rachael O'Neill (playing against Netherlands)
