= Joakim Klæboe =

Norwegian football manager

Personal information
- Full name: Joakim Gunnar Klæboe
- Date of birth: 12 December 1975 (age 50)

Senior career*
| Years | Team | Apps | (Gls) |
- Trøgstad/Båstad
- Askim

Managerial career
- 2004–2006: Moss (youth)
- 2007–2008: Moss (developer)
- 2008: Moss (caretaker)
- 2009–2010: Moss (assistant)
- 2011–2013: Sarpsborg 08 (assistant)
- 2014–2016: Sarpsborg 08 (developer)
- 2017–2019: Kristiansund (assistant)
- 2020–2022: Fredrikstad (assistant)
- 2022: Fredrikstad (caretaker)
- 2023–2024: Vålerenga women (assistant)
- 2024–2025: Sarpsborg 08 (assistant)
- 2025–: Bryne (assistant)
- * Club domestic league appearances and goals

Joakim Klæboe (born 12 December 1975) is a Norwegian football manager.

== Career ==
As a footballer, he had an unassuming career in Østfold for clubs such as Trøgstad/Båstad and Askim.

Klæboe was a U20 coach of Moss FK from 2004. Ahead of the 2007 season he was received a new position of player developer. In September 2008, however, he replaced Geir Bakke as manager, serving on an interim basis for the rest of the 2008 1. divisjon campaign. Moving to the position as assistant manager ahead of the 2009 season, Klæboe left Moss in August 2010.

In October 2010 he was announced as assistant manager of Sarpsborg 08, changing role to head of player development ahead of the 2014 season, and leaving the club after the 2016 season.

In December 2016, Klæboe was hired as the new assistant manager of Kristiansund BK, whom he left after three seasons in 2019. He instead moved back to Østfold as assistant manager of Fredrikstad FK. Klæboe served as such until September 2022, when manager Bjørn Johansen was sacked, and Klæboe took over as caretaker manager. Instead of continuing after the 2022 season, however, Klæboe left Fredrikstad by mutual consent.

In January 2023, Klæboe moved to the women's team Vålerenga Fotball Damer as a coach serving under Nils Lexerød. Klæboe then rejoined Sarpsborg 08 as assistant manager in July 2024, as that club had taken on Klæboe's boss from Kristiansund, Christian Michelsen, as manager. They were both sacked in August 2025 following unsatisfactory results. He was promptly picked up by Bryne FK as assistant manager, to help calm internal turmoil between certain players and the manager Kevin Knappen. Knappen was sacked after the 2025 season, and Klæboe left as well.

== Personal life ==
Joakim Klæboe is the father of footballer Julie Hoff Klæboe.
