= Lena Tyriberget =

Norwegian football coach

Personal information
- Date of birth: 26 July 1973 (age 53)
- Place of birth: Norway

Team information
- Current team: Norway U19 (manager)

Managerial career
- Years: Team
- 2004-2005: Liungen IF
- 2006-2007: Norway U15
- 2008: Kaiserslautern (analyst)
- 2011: Norway U19 (assistant)
- 2015-2017: Norway U16 and U17
- 2017: Norway (analyst)
- 2018-2020: Avaldsnes IL (sporting director)
- 2020-2021: Norway U16
- 2021: Norway U19
- 2021-2022: Norway (assistant)
- 2022-: Norway U19

Lena Tyriberget (born 26 July 1973) is a Norwegian football coach and teacher. Since 5 August 2022, she has been the head coach of Norway women's national Under-19 team. From 2021 until July 2022, she was one of two assistant coaches for the Norway women's national football team. Previously, she has also worked as head of youth development, member of board, assistant coach, manager, taken care of the field, and with analysis.

== Career ==
Tyriberget has herself been a football player, but due to injuries, she rather aimed to be a coach. Since 2002, she has amongst others coached several Norway national youth football teams. She has also studied to become a high school teacher in courses related to sports. With the help of the tool Interplay-sports, she has analysed football via video.

In the period 2004–2006, she worked as a teacher at Bjerke Upper Secondary School in Oslo. At the same time, she coached the football team Liungen IF in Toppserien. After a poor season, she resigned as a coach the autumn of 2005.

After the school year 2005-2006, she quit as a teacher and became the coach of Norway women's national under-15 team and worked for the Norwegian Football Federation, region East.

Autumn 2007, it became official that Kjetil Rekdal wanted Tyriberget as video analyst for the German club Kaiserslautern, which he was the manager of. She accepted the offer, but got a short stay since Rekdal got sacked in February 2008. Tyriberget got to continue in her role, but ended the cooperation with Kaiserslautern shortly after. She continued as a coach for the national team and working for the Norwegian Football Federation's region East.

In 2011, Tyriberget was the assistant coach for the Norway national under-19 team who won silver medal in the UEFA Under-19 Championship.

During the three year period 2015-2017, Tyriberget worked fulltime in the Norwegian Football Federation, mostly as a coach for the national under-16 and under-17 teams. Both in the UEFA Under-17 Championship 2015 and 2016, the team got through to the knockout stage, and they reached the semi-finals once. In addition, Tyriberget was the analyst during the UEFA Euro 2017 for the Norway national team.

In January 2018 in Norway, she finished the education she needed to get the UEFA PRO-licence, together with 19 others, among them were Monica Knudsen and Margunn Haugenes.

In the period 2018-2020, she was sporting director for Avaldsnes Idrettslag. Early in the summer of 2020, she returned to the Norwegian Football Federation in a challenging time. There she cooperated with Elise Brotangen about coaching the U15, U16 and U17 teams. In 2017, she was the coach of the U19 team temporarily, until Hege Riise became the coach, after she was done being the caretaker manager for the England national team.

In September 2021, it became official that Tyriberget would be assistant coach for the Norway women's national team. After the Euro 2022, she became the head coach of Norway U19, after Hege Riise became the head coach of Norway.
