= Michaela Kovacs =

American soccer player (born 1997)

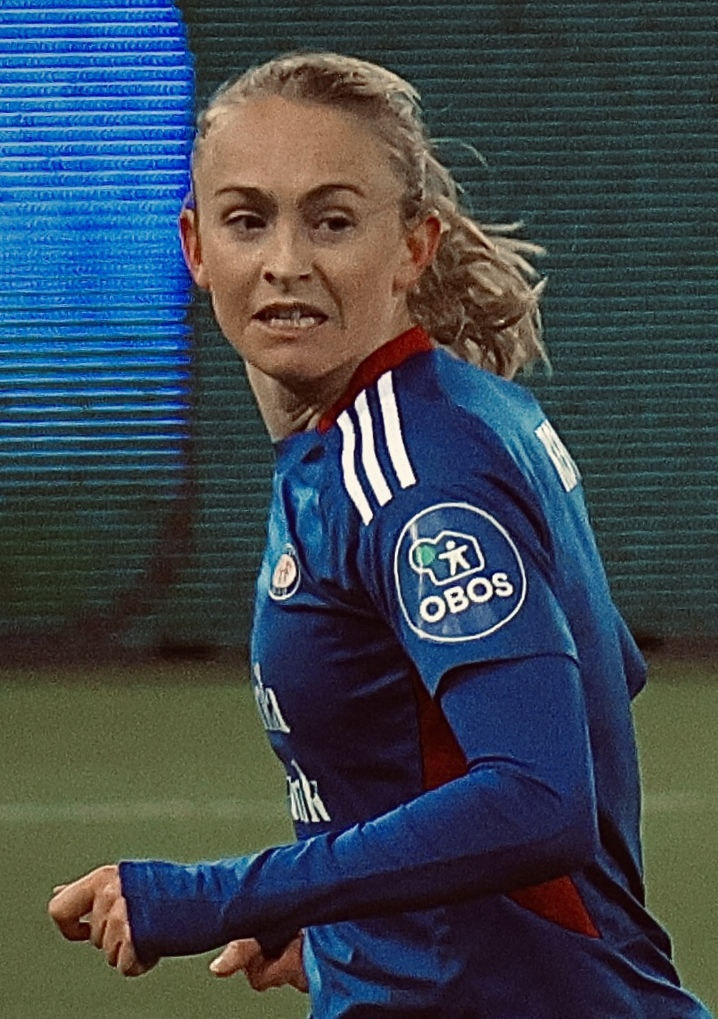
- Kovacs with Vålerenga in 2024

Personal information
- Full name: Michaela Dominique Kovacs
- Date of birth: March 9, 1997 (age 29)
- Height: 5 ft 6 in (1.68 m)
- Positions: Center back; defensive midfielder

Team information
- Current team: Brøndby
- Number: 3

College career
Years	Team	Apps	(Gls)
2015–2019	Michigan State Spartans	72	(7)

Senior career*
Years	Team	Apps	(Gls)
2020	Boavista	6	(1)
2021	Morön	24	(1)
2022–2023	KIF Örebro	42	(6)
2023–2025	Vålerenga	57	(8)
2026	Birmingham City	0	(0)
2026–	Brøndby	0	(0)

International career^{‡}
2016	United States U-19	1	(0)
- * Club domestic league appearances and goals as of July 12, 2026 ‡ National team caps and goals as of June 19, 2016

Michaela Dominique Kovacs (born March 9, 1997) is an American professional soccer player who plays as a center back for A-Liga club Brøndby in Denmark. She played college soccer for the Michigan State Spartans and made her breakthrough with Damallsvenskan club KIF Örebro, being named the club's Player of the Year in 2022. She was then sold to Norwegian club Vålerenga in 2023, winning two league titles and two national cups.

== Early life ==
Kovacs grew up in Hudsonville, Michigan, a suburb of Grand Rapids. She attended Hudsonville High School and earned first-team all-state honors as a junior in 2014. Her high school coach credited her with raising the team's level. She played club soccer for Grand Rapids Crew Juniors and captained the regional Olympic Development Program team. She also trained with the Grand Rapids Crew boys' team for several years. She committed to Michigan State during her sophomore year.

== College career ==
Kovacs played for the Michigan State Spartans between 2015 and 2019, appearing and starting in 72 games and scoring 7 goals. She started every game in her freshman and sophomore seasons and was named co-captain before her junior season. Just three games into her junior season, she suffered an anterior cruciate ligament injury while warming up and missed the rest of the year. She returned to the field and missed just four games in her redshirt junior and senior seasons.

During college, Kovacs also played for United Women's Soccer club Grand Rapids FC, training with the men's side the summer before joining the inaugural women's team in 2017. She helped lead GRFC to the UWS championship, scoring a late equalizer in the semifinals, and was named championship MVP after the final victory.

== Club career ==
=== Boavista ===
After going unselected in the 2020 NWSL College Draft, Kovacs signed with National Premier Leagues Queensland Women's club Logan Lightning in February 2020, but did not go on to the final roster. Later in the year, she began her professional career in earnest with Portuguese top-flight club Boavista. She made her professional debut and played the full 90 minutes in a 7–0 loss to Braga on October 10. On December 19, she scored her first professional goal in her sixth and final appearance for Boavista, a 1–0 win over Gil Vicente.

=== Morön ===
Kovacs joined Swedish club Morön in the second-tier Elitettan for the 2021 season. She made her Elitettan debut in a 4–1 win over Alingsås on the opening matchday on April 18. She became a key player for the club operating as a center back or defensive midfielder. On August 7, she scored her first and only Elitettan goal to conclude a 3–0 win over Sundsvall. Her performances helped Morön record the joint-second-best defense in the league as the club placed sixth of fourteen teams.

=== KIF Örebro ===
In November 2021, Kovacs signed a two-year contract with Swedish top-flight club KIF Örebro. She scored her first goal for the club in an 8–0 win over Jitex in the Svenska Cupen on March 13, 2022. On March 27, she made her Damallsvenskan debut in a 2–0 opening matchday loss to AIK. She scored her first Damallsvenskan goal three minutes into a 4–2 win over Kalmar on May 8. Toward the end of the season, she scored in three consecutive games as KIF Örebro won 4–0 vs. Kalmar, 5–1 vs. AIK, and 3–1 vs. Umeå. She ended the season with the joint-most league minutes for KIF Örebro (missing just one game and playing the entirety of the rest) and was their leading scorer with 6 goals in 25 games. For her contributions, she was named the club's Player of the Year for the 2022 season.

=== Vålerenga ===
In July 2023, after a lackluster start to the season, KIF Örebro sold Kovacs to Norwegian club Vålerenga, where she signed a two-and-a-half-year contract. She made her club – and Toppserien – debut in a 5–1 win over Åsane on August 26. Four days later, she scored her first goal for the club in a 2–0 win over Røa in the Norwegian Women's Cup. On September 6, she made her continental debut in a 3–1 win over Belarusian club FC Minsk in the first qualifying round of the UEFA Women's Champions League. Real Madrid eliminated Vålerenga from the competition in the final qualifying round. On October 22, she scored her first Toppserien goal in a 3–0 win over Lyn. She raised her first professional trophy at the end of the season when Vålerenga won their second league championship.

On May 25, 2024, Kovacs scored her first professional brace in a 4–1 league win over Åsane. On September 18, she scored her first continental goal – and was handed her first career red card – in a 2–1 win over Anderlecht in Belgium in the Champions League second qualifying round. Another win in the return leg sent Vålerenga to the Champions League group stage for the first time in club history. She made her full Champions League debut against Arsenal on October 16, playing the entirety of the 4–1 loss. On November 24, she appeared as a substitute in the Norwegian Women's Cup final as Vålerenga completed the domestic double by winning 1–0 over Rosenborg. Vålerenga retained the league title in dominant fashion with 24 wins from 27 games.

On September 11, 2025, Kovacs scored her tenth career goal for Vålerenga in a 3–0 win over Hungarian club Ferencváros in the Champions League third qualifying round; a 5–1 aggregate win put the club into the tournament proper for the second year in a row. On November 11, she helped Vålerenga to their first-ever Champions League league phase win, a 1–0 victory over Roma. Vålerenga finished the league season as runners-up to Brann but won their second consecutive Norwegian Women's Cup, with Kovacs playing the entire 2–0 win over Rosenborg again in the final.

=== Birmingham City ===
In January 2026, Kovacs signed with Women's Super League 2 club Birmingham City for the rest of the season.

=== Brøndby ===
In July 2026, it was announced that Kovacs had moved to A-Liga club Brøndby on a 1.5-year deal until the end of the 2027 season.

== International career ==
Kovacs was first called into training camp with the United States under-19 team in May 2015. In June 2016, she played in a friendly for the under-19s against the New Zealand women's team.

== Personal life ==
Kovacs is nicknamed "Mouse". She has been open about her experiences with depression.

== Honors and awards ==
Grand Rapids FC

- United Women's Soccer: 2017

Vålerenga

- Toppserien: 2023, 2024
- Norwegian Women's Cup: 2024, 2025

Birmingham City

- Women's Super League 2: 2025–26

Individual

- KIF Örebro Player of the Year: 2022
- United Women's Soccer Championship MVP: 2017
