= Synne Skinnes Hansen =

Norwegian football player (born 1995)

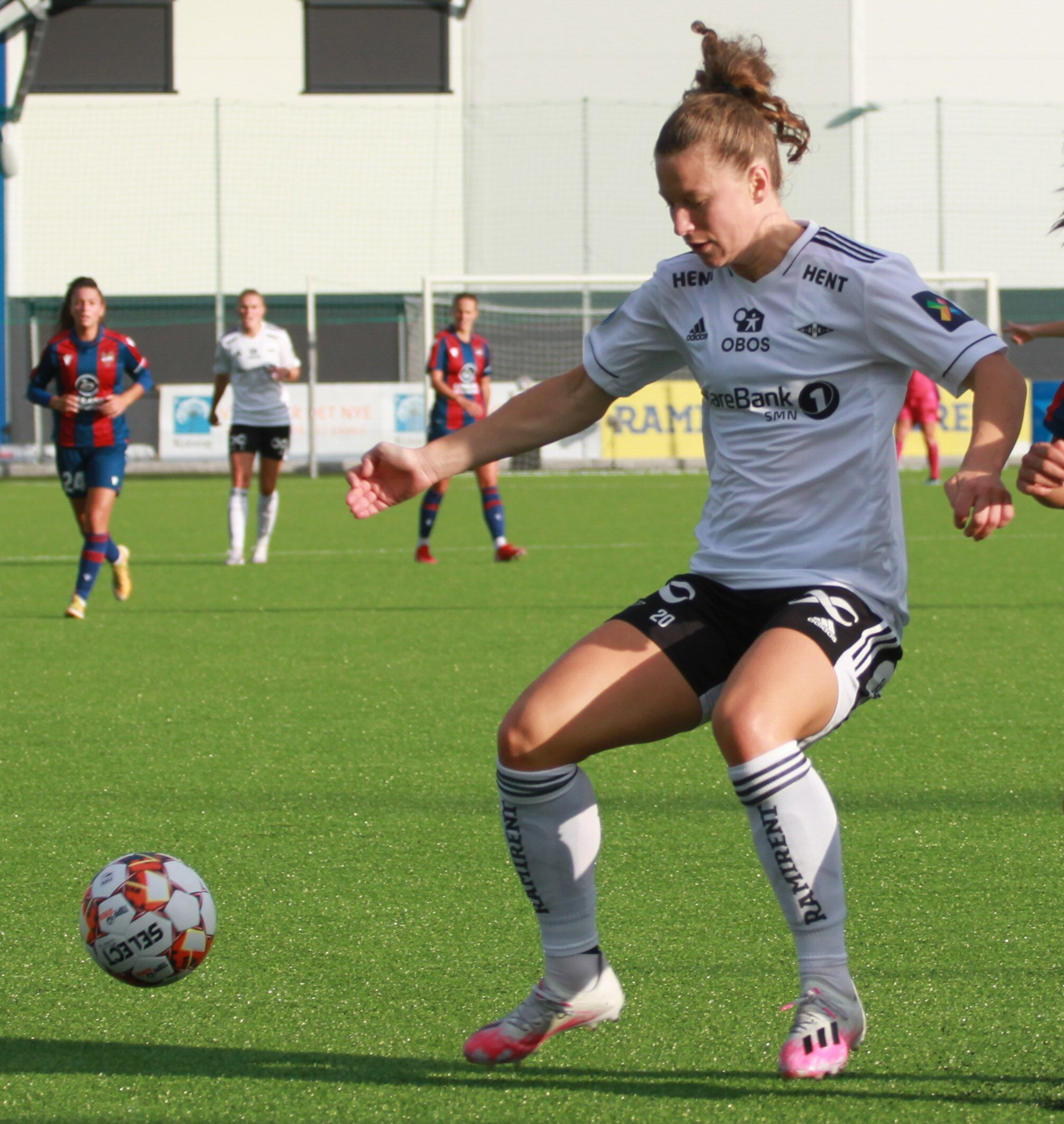

Personal information
- Full name: Synne Skinnes Hansen
- Date of birth: 12 August 1995 (age 31)
- Place of birth: Hvittingfoss, Norway
- Height: 1.71 m (5 ft 7 in)
- Position: Midfielder

Team information
- Current team: Vålerenga
- Number: 25

Senior career*
Years	Team	Apps	(Gls)
–2012	Eik-Tønsberg		
2012–2016	Røa	84	(27)
2017–2019	LSK Kvinner	59	(18)
2020–2021	Linköping	14	(0)
2021–2023	Rosenborg	45	(9)
2023–2025	Bayer Leverkusen	28	(2)
2025–	Vålerenga	5	(0)

International career^{‡}
2011	Norway U16	4	(0)
2012	Norway U17	2	(0)
2013–2014	Norway U19	23	(6)
2014–2024	Norway U23	17	(4)
2016–	Norway	27	(0)
- * Club domestic league appearances and goals as of 4 October 2025 ‡ National team caps and goals as of 27 February 2024

Synne Skinnes Hansen (born 12 August 1995) is a Norwegian professional footballer who plays as a midfielder and defender for Toppserien club Vålerenga and the Norway national team.

== Club career ==
Until 2012 she played for Eik-Tønsberg. Skinnes Hansen played in the top series for the Norway first division team Røa IL, who had won Toppserien the year before, starting in 2012. The title could not be defended and Røa was only fourth. In the following years, Røa commuted between 3rd and 8th place. She also played for Røa for the first time in the 2012–13 UEFA Women's Champions League, where Røa was eliminated against the later winner VfL Wolfsburg in the round of 16 after a 4–1 away defeat and a 1–1 home win. After five years with Røa, in 2017, she moved to new champions, Lillestrøm SK Kvinner. With Lillestrøm she won the Norwegian Championship in 2017 and 2018 and the Norwegian Football Cup in 2018. She played for Lillestrøm in the 2017–18 UEFA Women's Champions League, where Lillestrøm lost twice to Manchester City W.F.C. in the round of 16. In the 2018–19 UEFA Women's Champions League FC Barcelona Femení were stronger in the quarter-finals. She scored her first CL goal in the Round of 16 in a 2–0 away win over Brøndby IF.

== International career ==
Skinnes Hansen was part of Norway junior teams and took part in the 2013 UEFA Women's Under-19 Championship in Wales in August, but Norway was eliminated in the group stage. A year later, she and her team reached the semi-finals of the 2014 UEFA Women's Under-19 Championship in their home country, but lost 2–0 to Spain. Her time in the U-19 ended with eight matches with the U-23 team.

On 15 September 2016, she was substituted for captain Maren Mjelde in the 10–0 UEFA Women's Euro 2017 qualifying match against Kazakhstan for her first A international at 7–0 in the 68th minute. She had to wait a year for her next match. She was therefore not nominated for the European Championship 2017, when Norway was eliminated for the first time without scoring a goal. Also in the following games she was only substituted and also played again for the U-23. On 8 June 2018 she was then in the qualification game against Ireland for the first time in the starting eleven and was allowed to play 90 minutes. In 2019, she was in the starting eleven in all games until the nomination of the World Cup squad, but was almost always replaced, and achieved her first tournament success in the Algarve Cup 2019. On 2 May, she was nominated for the 2019 World Cup.

== Career statistics ==
As of 9 November 2019

Club	Season	Division	League		Cup		Continental		Total	
Club	Season	Division	Apps	Goals	Apps	Goals	Apps	Goals	Apps	Goals
Røa	2012	Toppserien	2	0	1	0	-		3	0
Røa	2013	Toppserien	20	7	3	0	2	0	25	7
Røa	2014	Toppserien	20	6	2	0	-		22	6
Røa	2015	Toppserien	21	9	3	2	-		24	11
Røa	2016	Toppserien	21	5	5	2	-		26	7
Røa	Total		84	27	14	4	2	0	100	31
LSK Kvinner	2017	Toppserien	19	3	3	2	-		22	5
LSK Kvinner	2018	Toppserien	20	6	5	1	3	0	28	7
LSK Kvinner	2019	Toppserien	20	9	2	1	5	1	27	11
LSK Kvinner	Total		59	18	10	4	8	1	77	23
LSK Kvinner	2020	Damallsvenskan	0	0	0	0	-		0	0
LSK Kvinner	Total		0	0	0	0	-	-	0	0
Career total			143	45	24	8	10	1	177	54
