= Stine Brekken =

Norwegian footballer (born 2004)

Stine Nybø Brekken
Personal information
- Date of birth: 19 December 2004 (age 21)
- Place of birth: Norway
- Position: Midfielder

Team information
- Current team: Vålerenga
- Number: 30

Youth career
- Åndalsnes
- Molde

Senior career*
Years	Team	Apps	(Gls)
2019–2021	Molde	6	(0)
2021–	Vålerenga	93	(9)

International career^{‡}
2019	Norway U15	4	(0)
2020	Norway U16	2	(1)
2021–2023	Norway U19	25	(1)
- * Club domestic league appearances and goals as of 4 October 2025 ‡ National team caps and goals as of 11 April 2023

Stine Nybø Brekken (born 19 December 2004) is a Norwegian professional footballer who plays as a midfielder for Toppserien club Vålerenga.

== Club career ==
=== Early career ===
Brekken started playing football for local club Åndalsnes IF, before joining Molde FK at the age of 14. She was considered so good that she was moved to the club's team for boys aged 16, to get a tougher training routine.

=== Vålerenga (2021–) ===
In January 2021 she signed a two-year deal with Vålerenga, starting from the summer of 2021. She made her league debut against Arna-Bjørnar on 21 March 2021.

In 2022 she was included in Aftenposten's list of the biggest talents in Norwegian football.

In 2025 she scored Vålerenga's first away goal in UEFA Women's Champions League competition helping seal a historic victory, claiming their first-ever win in the group stage or league phase of this competition.

== National team career ==
Brekken has international matches for U15, U16, and the U19 national team for Norway.

She was a part of the Norwegian squad who made it to the final of the 2022 UEFA Women's Under-19 Championship.
