= Lisa-Marie Karlseng Utland =

Norwegian footballer (born 1992)

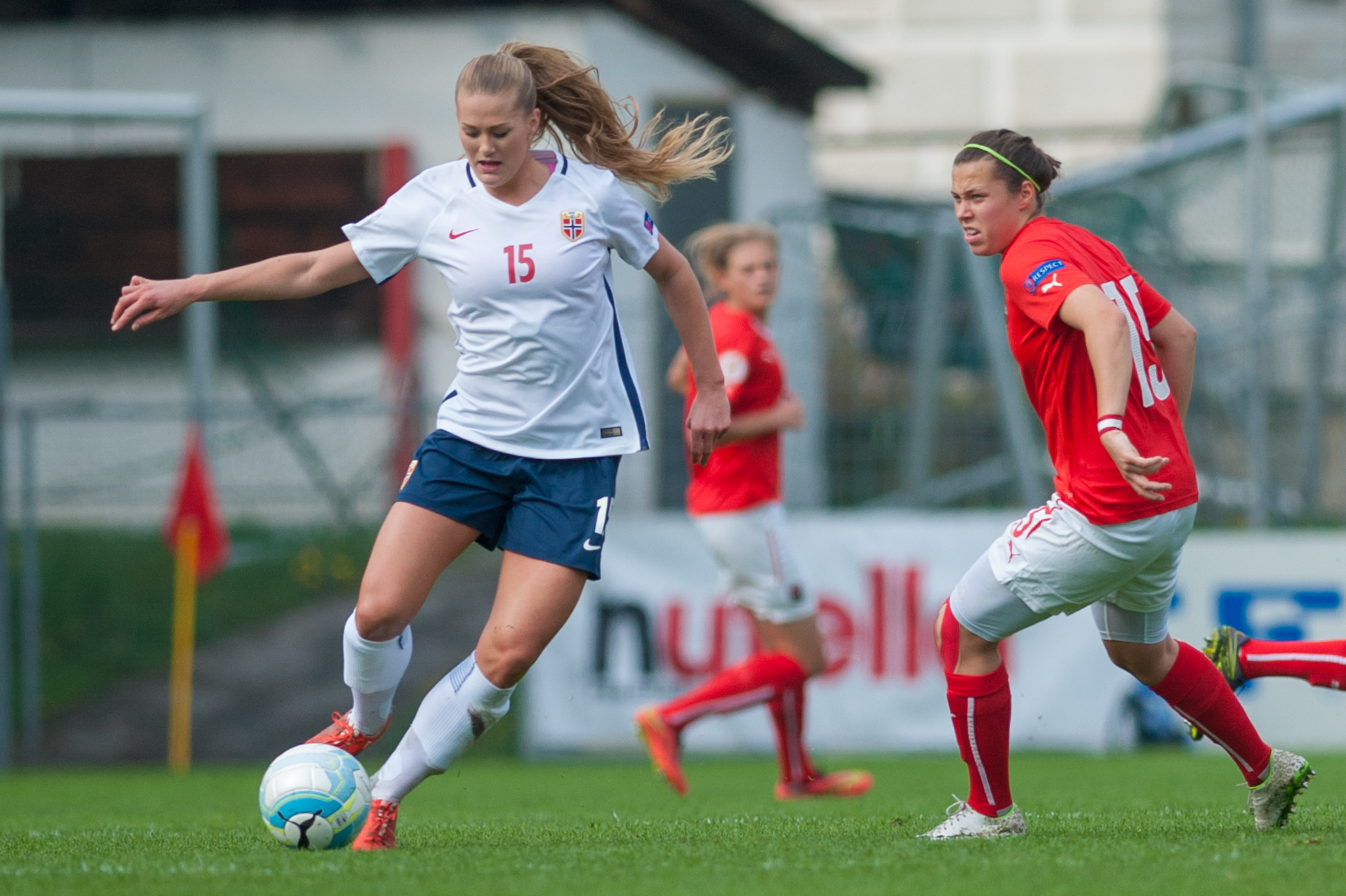

Personal information
- Full name: Lisa-Marie Karlseng Utland
- Date of birth: 19 September 1992 (age 34)
- Place of birth: Mo i Rana, Norway
- Height: 1.71 m (5 ft 7 in)
- Position: Forward

Youth career
- Gruben
- Bossmo & Ytteren

Senior career*
Years	Team	Apps	(Gls)
2009–2011	Fløya	29	(8)
2012	Amazon Grimstad	22	(7)
2013–2016	Trondheims-Ørn	82	(30)
2017	Røa	20	(17)
2018–2019	Rosengård	34	(15)
2019–2020	Reading	10	(1)
2020–2021	Rosenborg	36	(17)

International career^{‡}
2008	Norway U16	9	(6)
2009	Norway U17	6	(5)
2009–2010	Norway U19	15	(5)
2012	Norway U20	1	(0)
2014	Norway U23	7	(0)
2015–2021	Norway	65	(26)
- * Club domestic league appearances and goals as of 8 December 2021 ‡ National team caps and goals as of 8 December 2021

Lisa-Marie Karlseng Utland (born 19 September 1992) is a Norwegian former footballer who played as a forward.

== Career ==
Utland played 2010 season for the first division side IF Fløya which was eventually relegated at the end of the season. In 2012, she moved to Amazon Grimstad and scored seven goals in 23 games, helping the club narrowly avoid relegation. In 2013, she joined SK Trondheims-Ørn in Toppserien, for which she mainly played in the first team, but also appeared intermittently for the second team in the 2nd Division.

On 9 September 2019, Reading announced the signing of Utland.

In June 2020, Utland returned home to Norway and to her former team Trøndheims-Ørn who had just changed their name to Rosenborg Kvinner.

== International career ==
Utland underwent several Norwegian youth teams. In September 2008, she participated with the U-16 team at the qualifying tournament in Estonia for the 2009 UEFA Under-17 European Championship where they qualified for the second qualifying round, that was held in Macedonia in April 2009. They reached the final round in Nyon, when Norway was fourth. In September of the same year she was part of the U-19 team that participated in the qualifying for the 2010 UEFA Under-19 European Championship and lost to Germany in second round, falling to qualify for the tournament. In 2012, she played a match for the U-20 team and in 2014 she played for the U-23 team. On 8 April 2015 she was called for a friendly match against Netherlands, but she did not play. On 14 May 2015 she was nominated for the final squad for the 2015 FIFA World Cup, the only Norwegian player, in the roster, without any senior cap. She then played on 23 May in a friendly against Belgium.

== Personal life ==
Her mother Monica was a footballer, as was her aunt Lisbeth Karlseng who was capped 7 times for Norway between 1984 and 1986. Furthermore, Lisa-Marie is a twin sister of Marlene Karlseng Utland. Marlene was also capped as a Norway youth international (U16, U17, U19) and played for Fløya in Toppserien.

== Career statistics ==
As of match played 13 November 2021

Club	Season	Division	League		Cup		League Cup		Continental		Total	
Club	Season	Division	Apps	Goals	Apps	Goals	Apps	Goals	Apps	Goals	Apps	Goals
Fløya	2009	Toppserien	2	1	0	0	—		—		2	1
Fløya	2010	Toppserien	22	5	0	0	—		—		22	5
Fløya	2011	1. divisjon	5	2	0	0	—		—		5	2
Fløya	Total		29	8	0	0	-	-	-	-	29	8
Amazon Grimstad	2012	Toppserien	22	7	3	0	—		—		25	7
Amazon Grimstad	Total		22	7	3	0	-	-	-	-	25	7
Trondheims-Ørn	2013	Toppserien	20	7	2	2	—		—		22	9
Trondheims-Ørn	2014	Toppserien	21	6	4	6	—		—		25	12
Trondheims-Ørn	2015	Toppserien	20	10	3	7	—		—		23	17
Trondheims-Ørn	2016	Toppserien	21	7	4	9	—		—		25	16
Trondheims-Ørn	Total		82	30	13	24	-	-	-	-	95	54
Røa	2017	Toppserien	20	17	1	0	—		—		21	17
Røa	Total		20	17	1	0	-	-	-	-	21	17
Rosengård	2018	Damallsvenskan	20	6	4	0	—		—		24	6
Rosengård	2019	Damallsvenskan	14	9	4	3	—		4	1	22	13
Rosengård	Total		34	15	8	3	-	-	4	1	46	19
Reading	2019–20	FA WSL	10	1	0	0	5	5	—		15	6
Reading	Total		10	1	0	0	5	5	0	0	15	6
Rosenborg	2020	Toppserien	18	6	1	0	—		—		19	6
Rosenborg	2021	Toppserien	18	11	2	2	—		—		20	13
Rosenborg	Total		36	17	3	2	-	-	-	-	39	19
Career total			233	95	28	29	5	5	4	1	270	130

=== International goals ===
Goal	Date	Venue	Opponent	Score	Result	Competition
1	22 January 2016	Pinatar Arena Football Center, San Pedro del Pinatar, Spain	Romania	6–0	6–0	Friendly
2	19 January 2017	Pinatar Arena Football Center, San Pedro del Pinatar, Spain	Sweden	1–1	2–1	Friendly
3	15 September 2017	Nye Fredrikstad Stadion, Fredrikstad, Norway	Northern Ireland	3–0	4–1	2019 World Cup qualification
4	19 September 2017	Sarpsborg Stadion, Sarpsborg, Norway	Slovakia	1–0	6–1	2019 World Cup qualification
5	28 February 2018	Estádio Municipal de Albufeira, Albufeira, Portugal	Australia	2–3	3–4	2018 Algarve Cup
6	8 June 2018	Tallaght Stadium, Dublin, Ireland	Republic of Ireland	1–0	2–0	2019 World Cup qualification
7	8 June 2018	Tallaght Stadium, Dublin, Ireland	Republic of Ireland	2–0	2–0	2019 World Cup qualification
8	31 August 2018	NTC Senec, Senec, Slovakia	Slovakia	1–0	4–0	2019 World Cup qualification
9	31 August 2018	NTC Senec, Senec, Slovakia	Slovakia	3–0	4–0	2019 World Cup qualification
10	31 August 2018	NTC Senec, Senec, Slovakia	Slovakia	4–0	4–0	2019 World Cup qualification
11	17 January 2019	La Manga Football Centre A, La Manga, Spain	Scotland	2–0	3–1	Friendly
12	27 February 2019	Estádio Algarve, São João da Venda, Portugal	Denmark	2–1	2–1	2019 Algarve Cup
13	2 June 2019	Stade Moulonguet, Amiens, France	South Africa	2–0	7–2	Friendly
14	2 June 2019	Stade Moulonguet, Amiens, France	South Africa	3–0	7–2	Friendly
15	9 June 2019	Stade Auguste-Delaune, Reims, France	Nigeria	2–0	3–0	2019 FIFA Women's World Cup
16	4 October 2019	Borisov Arena, Barysaw, Belarus	Belarus	6–1	7–1	UEFA Women's Euro 2021 qualifying
17	8 October 2019	Tórsvøllur, Tórshavn, Faroe Islands	Faroe Islands	1–0	13–0	UEFA Women's Euro 2021 qualifying
18	8 November 2019	Viking Stadion, Stavanger, Norway	Northern Ireland	1–0	6–0	UEFA Women's Euro 2021 qualifying
19	8 November 2019	Viking Stadion, Stavanger, Norway	Northern Ireland	2–0	6–0	UEFA Women's Euro 2021 qualifying
20	8 April 2021	King Baudouin Stadium, Brussels, Belgium	Belgium	2–0	2–0	Friendly
21	16 September 2021	Ullevaal Stadion, Stavanger, Norway	Armenia	4–0	10–0	2023 FIFA Women's World Cup qualification
22	16 September 2021	Ullevaal Stadion, Stavanger, Norway	Armenia	7–0	10–0	2023 FIFA Women's World Cup qualification
23	16 September 2021	Ullevaal Stadion, Stavanger, Norway	Armenia	8–0	10–0	2023 FIFA Women's World Cup qualification
24	21 September 2021	Fadil Vokrri Stadium, Pristina, Kosovo	Kosovo	3–0	3–0	2023 FIFA Women's World Cup qualification
25	30 November 2021	Yerevan Football Academy Stadium, Yerevan, Armenia	Armenia	3–0	10–0	2023 FIFA Women's World Cup qualification
26	30 November 2021	Yerevan Football Academy Stadium, Yerevan, Armenia	Armenia	4–0	10–0	2023 FIFA Women's World Cup qualification
