= Andrine Tomter =

Norwegian footballer (born 1995)

Personal information
- Date of birth: 5 February 1995 (age 31)
- Place of birth: Drøbak, Norway
- Height: 1.74 m (5 ft 9 in)
- Position: Defender

Team information
- Current team: Rosenborg
- Number: 25

Youth career
- Drøbak-Frogn
- 2008–2010: Kolbotn Fotball

Senior career*
Years	Team	Apps	(Gls)
2011–2015	Kolbotn Fotball	80	(6)
2016–2017	Avaldsnes	35	(4)
2017–2018	FC Twente	23	(0)
2018–2023	Vålerenga	83	(1)
2023–2024	Inter Milan	18	(0)
2024–	Rosenborg	16	(0)

International career^{‡}
2010	Norway U15	3	(0)
2010–2011	Norway U16	12	(4)
2012	Norway U17	5	(0)
2012–2014	Norway U19	19	(0)
2017–2018	Norway U23	9	(0)
2014–2017	Norway	16	(0)
- * Club domestic league appearances and goals as of 06:36, 15 December 2025 (UTC) ‡ National team caps and goals as of 8 November 2018

Andrine Tomter (born 5 February 1995) is a Norwegian football defender who plays for Rosenborg and the Norway national team.

== Club career ==
Tomter began playing in the boys' teams at her local club Drøbak-Frogn, then joined Kolbotn aged 13. She progressed into Kolbotn's Toppserien team before signing a three-year contract with Avaldsnes in December 2015.

In August 2017, she signed a year contract with Dutch Eredivisie club FC Twente. In August 2018 she went back to Norway and Vålerenga.

== International career ==
Tomter won 39 caps for Norway from under-15 to under-19 level. She made her senior debut in January 2014, a 2–1 friendly win over Spain at La Manga Stadium. A serious knee injury meant Tomter could not play at the 2015 FIFA Women's World Cup, but she returned to the national team for the UEFA Women's Euro 2017 qualifying series.
