= Selma Pettersen =

Norwegian footballer (born 2003)

Personal information
- Date of birth: 21 February 2003 (age 23)
- Place of birth: Norway
- Position: Defender

Team information
- Current team: Vålerenga
- Number: 5

Youth career
- Kjelsås
- Lyn

Senior career*
Years	Team	Apps	(Gls)
2020–2021	Kolbotn	7	(0)
2021	→ Øvrevoll Hosle (loan)	6	(0)
2022–2023	Stabæk	35	(1)
2023–	Vålerenga	24	(0)

International career^{‡}
2018	Norway U15	2	(0)
2021–2022	Norway U19	10	(0)
2022–	Norway U23	7	(0)
- * Club domestic league appearances and goals as of 4 October 2025 ‡ National team caps and goals as of 30 November 2023

Selma Pettersen (born 21 February 2003) is a Norwegian professional footballer who plays as a defender for Toppserien club Vålerenga.

== Club career ==
=== Kolbotn (2020–2021) ===
Pettersen had trouble with injuries at the start of her career. She went through several surgeries before signing for Toppserien side Kolbotn in 2020. She made her toppserien debut in May 2020. In the second half of the 2021 season, she was loaned out to second-tier side Øvrevoll Hosle.

=== Stabæk (2022–2023) ===
In December 2021 she signed a two-year deal with Stabæk. She made her league debut against Vålerenga on 21 March 2022. Pettersen scored her first league goal against Lillestrøm SK on 18 June 2022, scoring in the 70th minute.

In 2022 she was included in Aftenposten's list of the biggest talents in Norwegian football.

=== Vålerenga (2023–) ===
In July 2023 she signed a two-year deal with Vålerenga. She described it as a dream came true to sign for the club she was supporting as a child. She made her league debut against Åsane on 26 August 2023.

== National team career ==
Pettersen has international matches for U15, U19, and the U23 national team for Norway.

She was a part of the Norwegian squad who made it to the final of the 2022 UEFA Women's Under-19 Championship.
