= 2015 Toppserien =

2015 season of the Norwegian Women's Super League

Toppserien
- Season: 2015
- Champions: LSK Kvinner
- Relegated: Amazon Grimstad
- Matches: 114
- Goals: 388 (3.4 per match)
- Top goalscorer: Isabell Herlovsen (19 goals)
- Biggest home win: Kolbotn 10–0 Medkila
- Biggest away win: Medkila 0–7 Avaldsnes
- Highest scoring: Kolbotn 10–0 Medkila
- Longest winning run: 6 games - LSK Kvinner
- Longest unbeaten run: 15 games - LSK Kvinner
- Longest winless run: 10 games - Medkila
- Longest losing run: 10 games - Medkila
- Total attendance: 29,726
- Average attendance: 225

The 2015 Toppserien was the 32nd season of top-tier women's football in Norway. A total of 12 teams contested for the league, eleven returning from the 2014 season and the one teams promoted from the First Division, Sandviken.

The season started on 28 March 2015 and ended on 7 November 2015.

Locations of the teams in the 2013 Toppserien

== Teams ==
Team	Location	Arena	Manager
Amazon Grimstad	Grimstad	Levermyr Stadion	Margunn Haugenes
Arna-Bjørnar	Bergen	Arna Stadion	Morten Røssland
Avaldsnes	Avaldsnes	Avaldsnes Idrettssenter	Colin Bell
Kolbotn	Kolbotn	Sofiemyr Stadion	Cecilie Berg-Hansen
Klepp	Kleppe	Klepp Stadion	Jon Pall Palmason
Lillestrøm	Lillestrøm	LSK-Hallen	Monica Knudsen
Medkila	Harstad	Harstad Stadion	Roy Berntsen
Røa	Oslo	Røa Kunstgress	Geir Nordby
Grand Bodø	Sandviken	Stemmemyren idrettsplass	Øystein Nordtveit
Stabæk	Bærum	Nadderud Stadion	Øyvind Eide
Trondheims-Ørn	Trondheim	Ranheim Arena	Trond Nordsteien
Vålerenga	Oslo	Vallhall Arena	David Brocken

== League table ==
Pos	Team	Pld	W	D	L	GF	GA	GD	Pts	Qualification or relegation
1	LSK Kvinner (C)	22	18	2	2	58	16	+42	56	Qualification for the Champions League round of 32
2	Avaldsnes	22	16	3	3	60	15	+45	51	Qualification for the Champions League qualifying round
3	Røa	22	10	8	4	32	24	+8	38	
4	Stabæk	22	10	7	5	32	17	+15	37	
5	Kolbotn	22	9	5	8	45	28	+17	32	
6	Klepp	22	8	6	8	36	46	−10	30	
7	Arna-Bjørnar	22	7	5	10	35	45	−10	26	
8	Trondheims-Ørn	22	7	3	12	27	38	−11	24	
9	Sandviken	22	5	6	11	23	36	−13	21	
10	Vålerenga	22	6	3	13	22	42	−20	21	
11	Medkila (O)	22	5	2	15	28	63	−35	17	Qualification for the relegation play-offs
12	Amazon Grimstad (R)	22	4	4	14	22	50	−28	15 (Note: Amazon Grimstad were deducted 1 point for lack of financial control.)	Relegation to First Division

Source: NIFS
Rules for classification: 1) points; 2) goal difference; 3) number of goals scored.
(C) Champions; (O) Play-off winners; (R) Relegated

== Relegation play-offs ==
Medkila won the relegation-playoff 3–0 and 5–0 against Grand Bodø and remained in the league.

== Top goalscorers ==
Rank	Player	Club	Goals
1	(Norway) Isabell Herlovsen	LSK Kvinner	19
2	(Norway) Cecilie Pedersen	Avaldsnes	18
3	(Norway) Hege Hansen	Klepp	13
4	(Norway) Lene Mykjåland	LSK Kvinner	11
5	(Norway) Lise-Marie Utland	Trondheims-Ørn	10
5	(Norway) Elise Thorsnes	Avaldsnes	10
7	(Iceland) Hólmfríður Magnúsdóttir	Avaldsnes	9
7	(Norway) Synne Skinnes Hansen	Røa	9
7	(Norway) Emilie Haavi	LSK Kvinner	9
10	(United States) Rosie Malone-Povolny	Medkila	8
10	(Norway) Gry Tofte Ims	Klepp	8
