= 2020 Norwegian Women's Cup =

Tournament details
- Country: Norway
- Teams: 20

Final positions
- Champions: Vålerenga (1st title)
- Runners-up: LSK Kvinner

The 2020 Norwegian Women's Cup was the 43rd season of the Norwegian annual knock-out football tournament. It began on 30 September 2020, severely belated due to the COVID-19 pandemic in Norway. Also, the cup was open to clubs in the first two tiers only. The clubs of the 2020 Toppserien entered in the first round, whereas the rest of the clubs in the 2020 1. divisjon contested a preliminary round.

== Preliminary round ==
Team 1	Score	Team 2
30 September 2020
Grei	1–2	KIL/Hemne
Øvrevoll Hosle	2–3	Amazon Grimstad
Åsane	1–2	Hønefoss
Fløya	3–1	Medkila

== First round ==
Team 1	Score	Team 2
6 October 2020
Hønefoss	0–5	Sandviken
7 October 2020
Rosenborg	1–0	Kolbotn
Røa	4–0	Fart
Klepp	1–3	Vålerenga
Fløya	1–2	Stabæk
Amazon Grimstad	0–5	Avaldsnes
Arna-Bjørnar	2–0	KIL/Hemne
LSK Kvinner	1–1 (5–3 on penalties)	Lyn

== Quarter-finals ==
Team 1	Score	Team 2
10 November 2020
Avaldsnes	1–0	Arna-Bjørnar
LSK Kvinner	1–0	Rosenborg
11 November 2020
Sandviken	2–1	Røa
Stabæk	1–2	Vålerenga

== Semi-finals ==
Team 1	Score	Team 2
21 November 2020
LSK Kvinner	2–1	Sandviken
22 November 2020
Vålerenga	4–0	Avaldsnes

== Final ==
13 December 2020
15:30 CET

LSK Kvinner	0–2 (a.e.t.)	Vålerenga
	Report	Njoya 102'; Markussen 105'

Ullevaal Stadion, Oslo
Attendance: 200
Referee: Henrikke Holm Nervik (Trygg/Lade)
