= Leif Tsolis =

Norwegian association football coach (born 1976)

Personal information
- Date of birth: 7 December 1976 (age 49)

Senior career*
Years	Team	Apps	(Gls)
- Liungen
- Åssiden
- Mercantile

Managerial career
- 2001–2006: Vålerenga (youth teams)
- 2007: Finnsnes (assistant)
- 2008: Røa
- 2010: Mjøndalen (assistant)
- 2011–2012: Flekkefjord
- 2013: Skarphedin
- 2013: Sandnes Ulf (junior team)
- 2014: Valdres
- 2015: Vålerenga Damer
- 2016–: F.C. Mallorca Toppfotball Femenina
- * Club domestic league appearances and goals as of 11 April 2015

Leif Tsolis (born December 7, 1976) is a Norwegian association football coach.

== Early career ==
From 2001-2006 Tsolis was the head coach for the U-group 2 in Vålerenga Fotball youth department on the men's side and a coach coordinator at the same time. He was also J16 coach for the inter-region team during this period.

In 2005 he started Scandinavian Football School, which was a 2 and 6 month football academy at Mallorca in Spain, for players of the age 16–23 years of age with ambitions to become top players. The football academy swapped name to Mallorca Toppfotball in 2016 and became a 9-month football academy, which offers students to play in Spanish league systems. Leif Tsolis founded at the same time a Spanish football club named F.C. Mallorca Toppfotball, which is affiliated with the academy. Tsolis has built up both the club and the academy, and is the owner of the projects. As a football coach, Tsolis has 8 promotions as head coach with his football teams, and the promotions has taken place both in Norway and Spain. He has none relegate as a football coach.

In 2008 and 2009 he was the head coach for Oslo Allianse FK, combined with being the head coach for Røa IL in the 2008 season. In 2007 he was full-time employed in Finnsnes IL as administrative manager, Project Manager for Sports City center and coach coordinator, combined with minor coach work at the A-team, B-team and J16-team.

In 2010 he was assistant trainer and top player developer in the 1. division club Mjøndalen IF, where he also was the in game coach for the 2nd team and had analysis tasks for the A team. In Mjøndalen he was a contact person against Norsk Toppfotball, Buskerud Top Coach Network and representative on national gatherings and international gatherings.

== Full-time coaching ==
In 2011 and 2012 he was a full-time A-team coach in Flekkefjord FK in the 3rd division, combined with the role of player developer and coach developer.

In 2014 he was head coach and development manager in the Norwegian 2nd division for Valdres FK. In 2013, junior elite coach for the junior team at the Eliteserie club Sandnes Ulf and also worked at Wang Toppidrett Stavanger.

By 2015, Tsolis was the head coach in the Norwegian Toppserien for Vålerenga Fotball Damer, one of Norway's biggest and most famous football clubs. He was also a coach in Vålerenga's youth department for 6 years during the period 2001–2007, and this was where he started his coaching career.

Since the autumn of 2015, Tsolis has been the main trainer for the A-team and Top Player Developer at F.C. Mallorca Toppfotball Femenina (a club in Spain). He has been Sports Manager at Mallorca Toppfotball (Full-time Academy in Spain) during the same period. At this time he has built a professional football academy for women and men, and Tsolis is the owner of both the academy and the club. He has two promotion on season in Spain.
