= Maria Olsvik =

Norwegian footballer (born 1994)

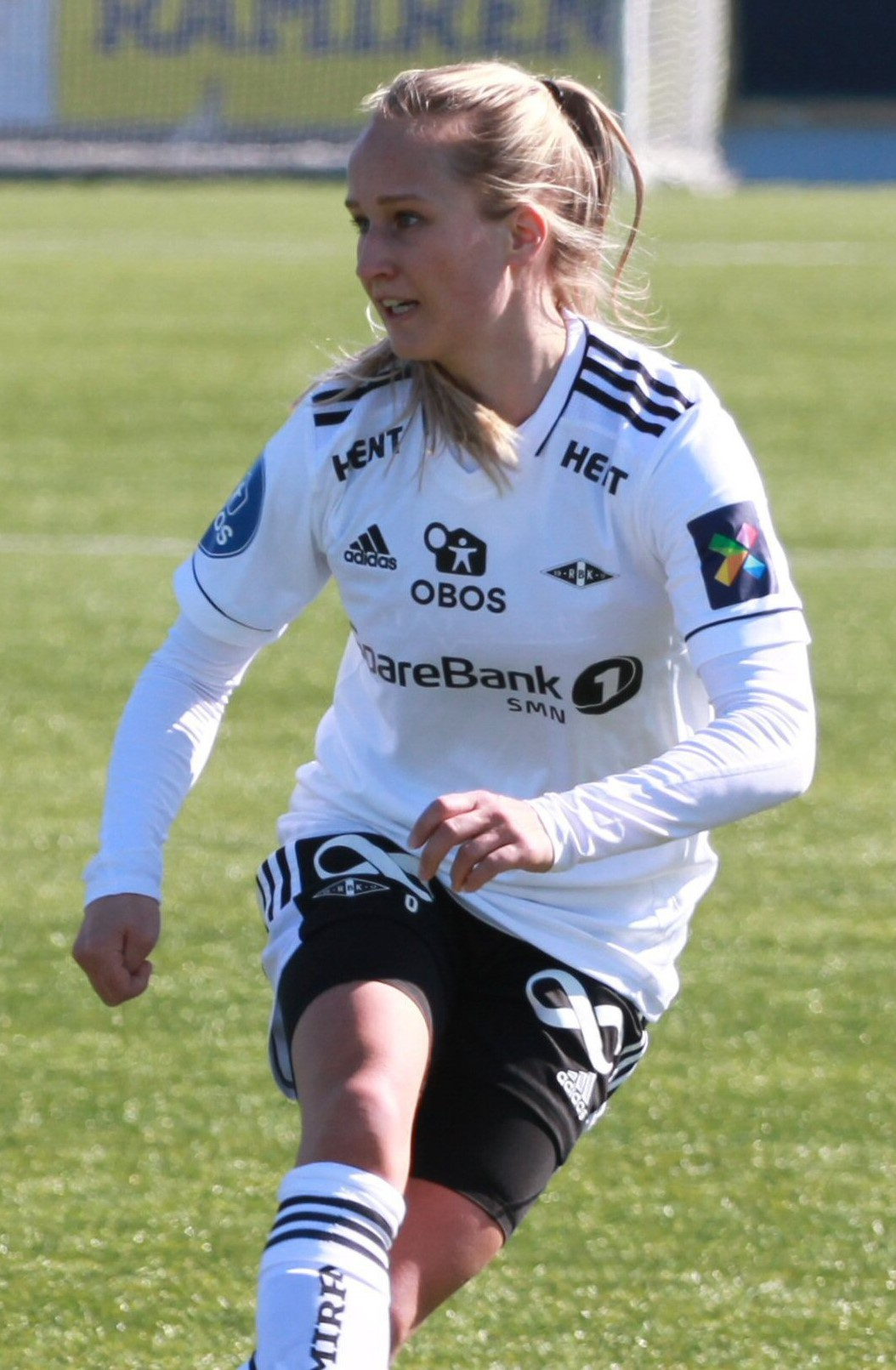

Personal information
- Date of birth: 23 September 1994 (age 32)
- Place of birth: Norway,
- Height: 1.75 m (5 ft 9 in)
- Positions: Full back; winger

Team information
- Current team: Rosenborg
- Number: 8

Senior career*
Years	Team	Apps	(Gls)
2010–2012	Kattem	49	(2)
2013–	Rosenborg	156	(11)

International career^{‡}
2010	Norway U16	4	(0)
2011	Norway U17	2	(0)
2012–2013	Norway U19	4	(1)
- * Club domestic league appearances and goals as of 9 May 2022 ‡ National team caps and goals as of 9 May 2022

Maria Olsvik (born 23 September 1994) is a Norwegian footballer who plays for Rosenborg. In 2021, she was called up for the Norway national team for the first time.

== Club career ==
Olsvik started her professional career in Kattem, a team in that used to play in Toppserien, but after the club had to withdraw from the league, she decided to change club. Like several other players, including Guro Reiten, she moved to at the time Trondheims-Ørn (now Rosenborg) in 2013.

In 2020 she missed the first season after Trondheims-Ørn became Rosenborg, since she was pregnant. Rosenborg came second in Toppserien that year, after Trondheims-Ørn had been a mid-table team for the last eight years Olsvik had played for the club. However, she had a strong comeback in 2021 and took a part when Rosenborg came second in Toppserien that season as well. Martin Sjögren, among others, said he hasn't experienced many players coming back at the level that she did after giving birth, and that she shows that a career doesn't have to be over after getting a child.

== International career ==
Olsvik has played ten matches and scored one goal for Norway youth national teams. She scored the goal one minute after being substituted when she debuted on the U19 national team in an away match against Sweden, one week before she turned 18.

In October 2021, she was called up for the Norway national team for the first time, 14 months after giving birth and at the age of 27. She had then played 11 years in Toppserien, the top level in football in Norway, without being called up. After selecting Olsvik, the coach of the national team, Martin Sjögren, said that it shows that there are several different paths to get a place on the national team. Some players, like Julie Blakstad and Elisabeth Terland, come directly from the youth national teams. Others, like Guro Bergsvand and Olsvik, were called up at an older age.

== Style of play ==
In Rosenborg, she plays left back, and at the national team she was called up to play either back or winger. The author of the round 11 dual in Toppserien in 2021, concluded that her best abilities are in defence. She is especially good in one vs one situations. Martin Sjögren adds that her speed on the field is also a skill with international quality.

== Personal life ==
She has studied the integrated master in Chemical Engineering and Biotechnology at NTNU.

During the COVID-19 pandemic, she spoke about how strict UEFA's COVID rules were. They made it impossible for her to meet her one-year-old son for ten days, during her first call up to the national team.
