= Guro Pettersen =

Norwegian footballer (born 1991)

Personal information
- Date of birth: 22 August 1991 (age 35)
- Place of birth: Tromsø, Norway
- Height: 1.75 m (5 ft 9 in)
- Position: Goalkeeper

Team information
- Current team: Stabæk
- Number: 25

Youth career
- Fløya

Senior career*
Years	Team	Apps	(Gls)
2008–2012	Fløya	30	(0)
2012–2013	Stabæk	4	(0)
2014–2015	Vålerenga	34	(0)
2016–2017	Stabæk	2	(0)
2017	→ Fortuna Hjørring (loan)	0	(0)
2017	→ Arna-Bjørnar (loan)	1	(0)
2018–2019	Vålerenga	20	(0)
2020–2021	Piteå	28	(1)
2022–2024	Vålerenga	25	(0)
2024	Werder Bremen	0	(0)
2024–2025	Damaiense		
2025–	Stabæk	0	(0)

International career^{‡}
2007–2008	Norway U17	11	(0)
2008–2010	Norway U19	11	(0)
2011–2014	Norway U23	8	(0)
2022–	Norway	7	(0)
- * Club domestic league appearances and goals as of 23:27, 18 July 2024 (UTC) ‡ National team caps and goals as of 9 July 2023 (UTC)

Guro Pettersen (born 22 August 1991) is a Norwegian professional footballer who most recently played as a goalkeeper for Toppserien club Stabæk. She has represented Norway internationally in youth teams and made her debut for the Norway national team on 7 April 2022 at the age of 30.

== Club career ==
Pettersen started her career in Fløya in 2008, moving south in 2012 to Stabæk and Vålerenga (two periods in each). Between 2007 and 2014 she also played for Norwegian age-specific national teams.

She first got national media attention, when tweeting that she should show the Stabæk manager "some of my other qualities", in order to dethrone Ingrid Hjelmseth as first-choice goalkeeper. The tweet alluded to the Stabæk manager allegedly having a romantic affair with one of the other players. According to the reports, Pettersen got this attention unwillingly because she was hacked. She was immediately approached by men's magazines to do photo shoots. She later alleged that the hosts of a football podcast she was guesting, asked her if she had ever slept with a male professional footballer. The podcast was never aired. Pettersen participated in debates on the gender inequality in football.

In the winter of 2017, during the Norwegian off-season, she was loaned out to Danish club Fortuna Hjørring for the remainder of the 2016–17 Elitedivisionen. She was benched twice in the 2016–17 UEFA Women's Champions League, but did not make a mark in Hjørring and was loaned out to Arna-Bjørnar for the remainder of 2017.

Ahead of the 2020 season, she joined Swedish club Piteå. She decided on the move in order to fight her way onto the Norway national team. She was called up several times in the 2010s, but last in 2015, before Martin Sjögren took over as head coach. She was eventually called up to the national team in September 2020. In 2010 and 2021 she was benched club times for the national team.

In May 2021 Pettersen scored a goal for Piteå in open play, clearing the ball from the midfield. At the end of the season she was given the Goal of the Year award in the 2021 Damallsvenskan. At the time, the Twitter video of the goal had been watched 100,000 times. She did however leave Piteå after the season, to commence her third spell in Vålerenga.

On 1 February 2024, Pettersen joined Frauen-Bundesliga club Werder Bremen. Werder Bremen signed her as a replacement for Catalina Pérez who had sustained a long-term injury.

== International career ==
Pettersen made her senior team debut on 7 April 2022.

Pettersen was part of the squad that was called up to the UEFA Women's Euro 2022.

On 19 June 2023, she was included in the 23-player Norwegian squad for the FIFA Women's World Cup 2023.

== See also ==
- List of goalscoring goalkeepers
