= Susan Ama Duah =

Ghanaian footballer

Susan Ama Duah (born 3 February 2002) is a Ghanaian professional footballer who plays as a centre-back and defensive midfielder for Mexican club Liga Femenil side Tigres UANL and the Ghana national team.

== Career ==
Duah was born in Begoro. She has played for the Ghana U20 and for Norwegian side Avaldsnes IL. In 2021, she represented Gokulam Kerala in the AFC Women's Club Championship.
