= Mimmi Löfwenius =

Swedish footballer (born 1994)

Personal information
- Full name: Mimmi Matilda Löfwenius Veum
- Date of birth: 16 February 1994 (age 32)
- Place of birth: Alingsås, Sweden
- Height: 1.69 m (5 ft 7 in)
- Position: Forward

Youth career
- Holmalunds IF

Senior career*
Years	Team	Apps	(Gls)
2010–2011	Dalsjöfors	20	(4)
2012	Göteborg	7	(0)
2012–2013	Jitex BK	28	(9)
2014–2017	LSK Kvinner	46	(6)
2018–2020	Lyn	26	(5)
2020	→ LSK Kvinner (loan)	11	(4)
2021–2023	LSK Kvinner	27	(11)
2023–2025	Vålerenga	8	(2)

International career^{‡}
2010–2011	Sweden U17	6	(0)
2011–2013	Sweden U19	11	(0)
2023	Norway	2	(0)
- * Club domestic league appearances and goals as of 30 March 2025 ‡ National team caps and goals as of 31 October 2023

Mimmi Löfwenius Veum (born 16 February 1994) is a Swedish-Norwegian former football forward.

She won the 2012 UEFA Women's Under-19 Championship in Turkey with Sweden U19 national team.

In 2009 Löfwenius collapsed during a match and was diagnosed with cardiac dysrhythmia. Although doctors advised her to quit football, she carried on and signed for Dalsjöfors GoIF in 2010. After impressing in the 2011 Damallsvenskan season Löfwenius joined Kopparbergs/Göteborg FC ahead of 2012. She left part way through the season, for Jitex BK, hoping to get more playing time.

Löfwenius was born and grew up in Sweden. She gained Norwegian citizenship through marriage, and in 2023 she won her first cap for Norway.
