= 2024 Norwegian Women's Cup =

Tournament details
- Country: Norway

Final positions
- Champions: Vålerenga
- Runners-up: Rosenborg

The 2024 Norwegian Women's Cup was the 47th season of the Norwegian annual knock-out football tournament. The first round was played in April and May 2024. The final was played on 24 November 2024.

== First round ==
| Team 1 | Score | Team 2 |
|---|---|---|
7 April 2024
| Medkila | 0–4 | Bodø/Glimt |
24 April 2024
| Blindheim | 1–1 (2–4 p) | AaFK Fortuna |
30 April 2024
| Molde | 3–0 | KIL/Hemne |
2 May 2024
| Bryne | 3–0 | Haugesund |
8 May 2024
| Mjølner | 0–1 | Hønefoss |
| Grei | 1–2 | KFUM |
| Lillestrøm | 0–2 | HamKam |
| Kongsvinger | 1–2 | Frigg |
| Strømsgodset | 1–2 | Odd |
| Sandefjord | 0–2 | Øvrevoll Hosle |
| Snøgg | 1–3 | Start |
| Amazon Grimstad | 4–0 | Arendal |
| Klepp | w/o | Viking |
| Fana | 0–1 | Fyllingsdalen |
| Volda | 5–3 | Herd |
| Tynset | 1–3 | Tiller |
| Krokelvdalen | 0–6 | TIL 2020 |
| Bjørnevatn | w/o | Porsanger |
| Sarpsborg 08 | 4–1 | Nanset |
| Sola | 0–2 | Avaldsnes |
9 May 2024
| Steinkjer | 4–1 | Bossmo/Ytteren |
| Raufoss | 1–1 (3–4 p) | Sogndal |

== Second round ==
The 10 teams from Toppserien enter in this round.

| Team 1 | Score | Team 2 |
|---|---|---|
30 May 2024
| Hønefoss | 4–1 | Odd |
2 June 2024
| Volda | 1–5 | AaFK Fortuna |
5 June 2024
| Sogndal | 0–6 | Åsane |
| KFUM | 0–4 | Lyn |
11 June 2024
| Øvrevoll Hosle | 0–7 | Stabæk |
| HamKam | 1–5 | Røa |
12 June 2024
| Molde | 1–0 (a.e.t.) | Kolbotn |
| Bodø/Glimt | 3–0 | Tiller |
| Frigg | 0–4 | Vålerenga |
| Start | 4–0 | Amazon Grimstad |
| Viking | 2–0 | Bryne |
| Avaldsnes | 0–3 | Brann |
| Fyllingsdalen | 1–2 | Arna-Bjørnar |
| Steinkjer | 0–7 | Rosenborg |
| TIL 2020 | w/o | Bjørnevatn |
| Sarpsborg 08 | 1–5 | LSK Kvinner |

== Third round ==
| Team 1 | Score | Team 2 |
|---|---|---|
25 June 2024
| Start | 2–4 | Vålerenga |
26 June 2024
| Stabæk | 2–1 | Hønefoss |
| Røa | 2–1 | TIL 2020 |
| Åsane | 0–4 | Brann |
| Arna-Bjørnar | 2–4 | Viking |
| AaFK Fortuna | 2–1 | LSK Kvinner |
| Molde | 0–4 | Rosenborg |
| Lyn | 2–1 | Bodø/Glimt |

== Quarter-finals ==
| Team 1 | Score | Team 2 |
|---|---|---|
20 August 2024
| Stabæk | 1–5 | Vålerenga |
21 August 2024
| Viking | 0–2 | Rosenborg |
| AaFK Fortuna | 0–4 | Brann |
| Lyn | 1–2 | Røa |

== Semi-finals ==
The pairings for the semi-finals were drawn on 21 August 2024, after the completion of the last quarter-final match.

| 28 September 2024 | Røa | 1–3 | Rosenborg | Oslo |
| 16:00 CEST | Klæboe 78' | Report | Sørum 17' (pen.); Sødahl 37'; Nautnes 45+2' | Stadium: Røa kunstgress Attendance: 443; Referee: Karoline Marie Jensen |

| 29 September 2024 | Vålerenga | 3–1 | Brann | Oslo |
| 16:00 CEST | Bjelde 24'; Godø 45+2'; Sævik 55' | Report | Haugland 19' | Stadium: Intility Arena; Attendance: 886; Referee: Jørgen Haugen |

== Final ==
24 November 2024
15:00 CET

| Rosenborg | 0–1 | Vålerenga |
|---|---|---|
| | Report | Hørte 60' |

Ullevaal Stadion, Oslo
Attendance: 3,017
Referee: Sarah Fatemeh Zangeneh
