= Tove Enblom =

Swedish footballer (born 1994)

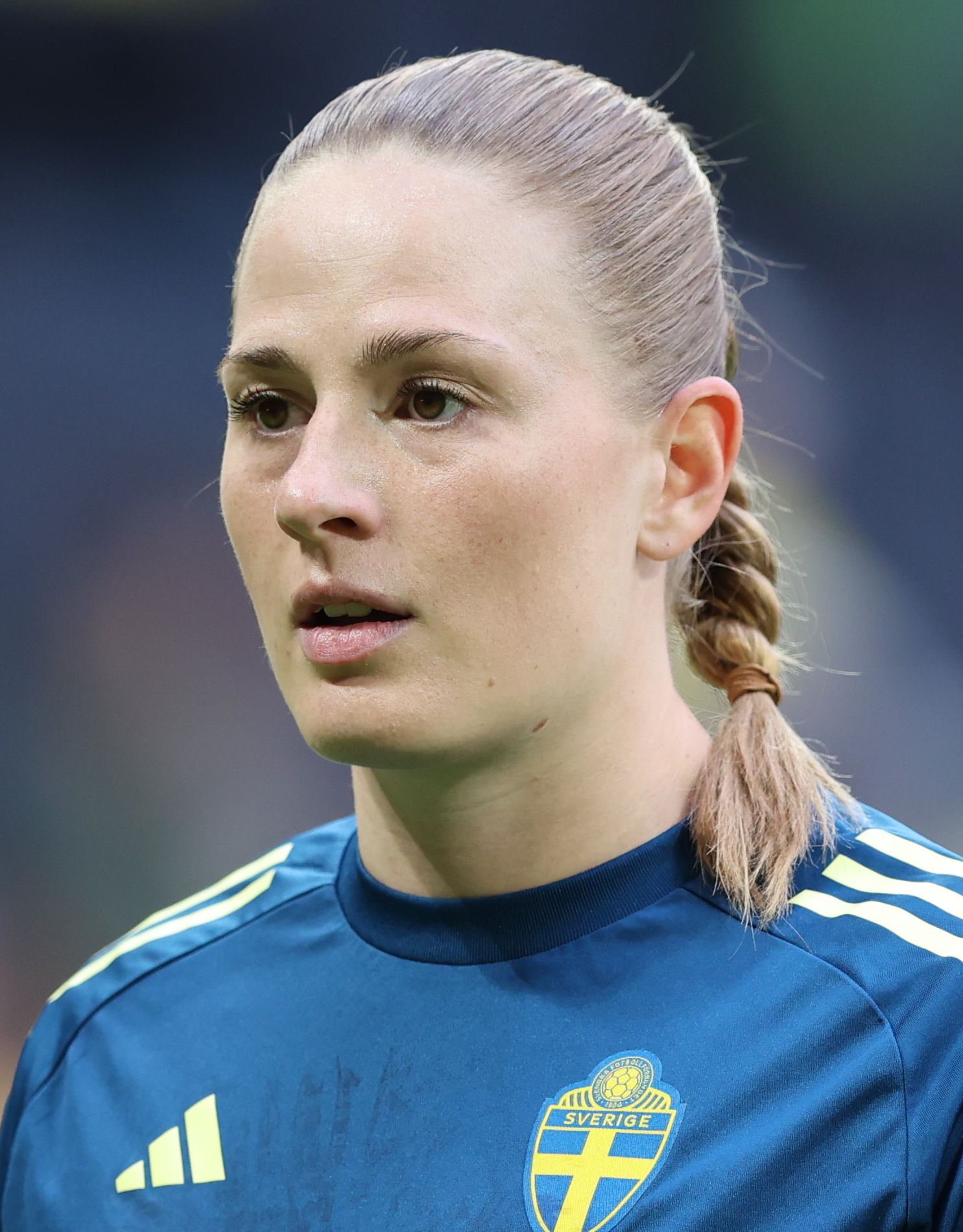
- Enblom with Sweden in 2026

Personal information
- Full name: Tove Evelina Enblom
- Date of birth: 20 November 1994 (age 31)
- Place of birth: Stockholm, Sweden
- Height: 1.78 m (5 ft 10 in)
- Position: Goalkeeper

Team information
- Current team: Vålerenga
- Number: 1

Senior career*
Years	Team	Apps	(Gls)
2012–2013	Djurgårdens IF	27	(0)
2014–2017	Umeå IK	51	(0)
2018	IFK Kalmar	18	(0)
2019–2020	Umeå IK	23	(0)
2021–2023	KIF Örebro	64	(0)
2024–	Vålerenga	38	(0)

International career^{‡}
2015	Sweden U23	1	(0)
2025–	Sweden	1	(0)
- * Club domestic league appearances and goals as of 11:40, 4 October 2025 (UTC) ‡ National team caps and goals as of 26 June 2025

Tove Evelina Enblom (born 20 November 1994) is a Swedish professional footballer who plays as a goalkeeper for Toppserien club Vålerenga and the Sweden national team.

== Club career ==
Enblom made her league debut against Linköping FC on 10 June 2012.

On 25 May 2014, Enblom made her league debut against Kristianstads on 25 May 2014.

In 2018, Enblom was announced at IFK Kalmar. She made her league debut against Piteå IF on 15 April 2018. On October 26, 2018, it was announced that Enblom would miss the final game of the season due to injury.

In 2019, Enblom was announced at Umeå IK. She made her league debut against Kvarnsvedens IK on 17 August 2019. On 27 September 2021, Enblom extended her contract. On 18 October 2022, she extended her contract.

On 17 December 2020, Enblom was announced at KIF Örebro. She made her league debut against Djurgårdens on 17 April 2021.

In 2024, Enblom was announced at Vålerenga. She made her league debut against Stabæk on 18 March 2024.

== International career ==
On 13 June 2023, Enblom was included in the 23-player squad for the 2023 FIFA Women's World Cup. On 26 June 2025, she made her senior team debut for Sweden in a 2–0 win against Norway.

== Career statistics ==
=== International ===
As of match played 26 June 2025

Appearances and goals by national team and year
National team	Year	Apps	Goals
Sweden	2025	1	0
Sweden	2026	0	0
Total		1	0
