= Marie Dølvik Markussen =

Norwegian footballer (born 1997)

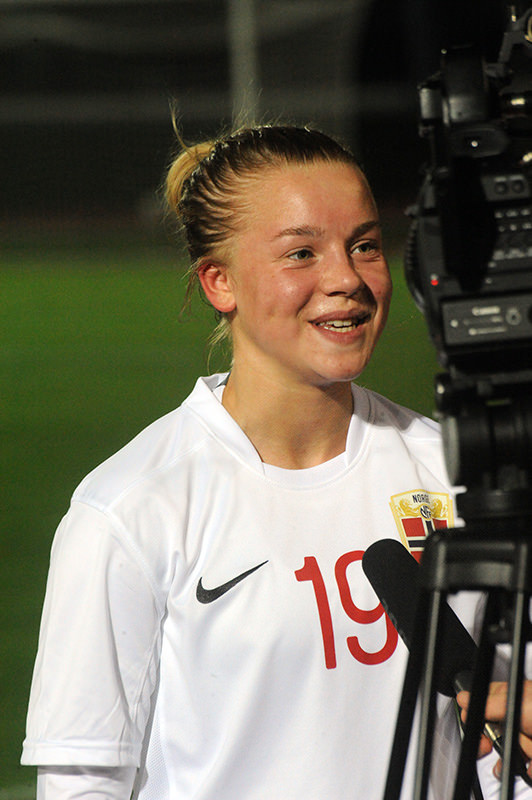
- Dølvik Markussen with Norway's national team in 2015

Personal information
- Date of birth: 15 February 1997 (age 29)
- Place of birth: Tromsø, Norway
- Height: 1.70 m (5 ft 7 in)
- Position: Forward

Team information
- Current team: Rosenborg

Youth career
- Stakkevollan IF

Senior career*
Years	Team	Apps	(Gls)
2012–2013	Stakkevollan IF	12	(15)
2014–2016	Stabæk	49	(17)
2017–2018	VfL Wolfsburg II	1	(0)
2018–2021	Vålerenga	69	(15)
2021–2022	Newcastle Jets	9	(2)
2022–2024	Rosenborg	2	(0)
2024	FK Bodø/Glimt Kvinner	0	(0)

International career^{‡}
2015	Norway	3	(0)
- * Club domestic league appearances and goals as of 4 April 2022 ‡ National team caps and goals as of 28 December 2016

Marie Dølvik Markussen (born 15 February 1997) is a Norwegian footballer who plays as a forward for Toppserien club Rosenborg. She made her debut for the Norway women's national football team in 2015.

== Club career ==
After breaking through at her local lower division club Stakkevollan IF, she signed for Oslo-based Toppserien club Stabæk in November 2013 for a compensation payment of around 10.000 NOK. In December 2016, she moved on to VfL Wolfsburg, who simultaneously allowed another Norwegian Synne Jensen to return to Stabæk on a permanent basis.

She went back to playing in Toppserien after joining Vålerenga in 2018. In November 2021, Dølvik Markussen joined Australian club Newcastle Jets for the 2021–22 A-League Women season.

== International career ==
Following appearances for Norway at the youth international level, Dølvik Markussen made her senior debut for Norway at the 2015 Algarve Cup.

== Personal life ==
In November 2012, 15-year-old Dølvik Markussen and her older brother Henning foiled an attempted burglary at their family home in Tromsø. She has over one hundred tattoos. She was in a romantic relationship with Ingrid Engen.

== Honours ==
=== VfL Wolfsburg ===
- Frauen-Bundesliga: 2016–17
- DFB-Pokal Frauen: 2016–17

=== Vålerenga ===
- Toppserien
  - Winner: 2020
  - Runner-up: 2019
- Norwegian Women's Cup
  - Winner: 2020, 2021
  - Runner-up: 2017, 2019
