= Nils Lexerød =

Norwegian footballer and manager (born 1976)

Personal information
- Full name: Nils Unneberg Lexerød
- Date of birth: 7 March 1976 (age 50)
- Positions: Right back; defensive midfielder

Team information
- Current team: Vålerenga women (manager)

Youth career
- Halden
- Kvik Halden

Senior career*
Years	Team	Apps	(Gls)
1992–1997	Kvik Halden		
1998–1999	Kolbotn		
2000	Rakkestad		
2001–2003	Borg		

Managerial career
- 2004–2006: Sparta Sarpsborg (assistant)
- 2006–2010: Sparta/Sarpsborg 08 (developer)
- 2011–2012: Kvik Halden (sports director)
- 2013–2014: Kvik Halden
- 2014–2019: Norway women U19
- 2019–2021: Norway women U23
- 2022–: Vålerenga women
- * Club domestic league appearances and goals

Nils Unneberg Lexerød (born 7 March 1976) is a Norwegian footballer and manager. Working several years as a youth national team coach, his main accolades as a manager are two Toppserien titles with Vålerenga.

== Playing career ==
Lexerød grew up in Halden with family ties to Aremark. He was the captain of Halden FK's boys' team before moving to Kvik Halden. He made his senior debut for Kvik Halden in a 1992 pre-season friendly.

Ahead of the 1998 season he moved to Kolbotn. He studied nearby, at the Norwegian College of Agriculture. He took the cand.agric. degree before being employed as a research fellow for a period. After spending the 2000 season playing for Rakkestad IF he moved to the new cooperation team in Sarpsborg, which eventually was named Borg Fotball.

== Managing career ==
Lexerød gave up his playing career when offered the position as assistant manager of Sparta Sarpsborg, which the cooperation club was now called. After the 2005 season he assumed a position as player developer, while also being in charge of the B team. Lexerød left as assistant manager after the 2006 season. The club assumed yet another identity in Sarpsborg 08 FF, where Lexerød continued until announcing his resignation in 2010. In this season, Sarpsborg 08 won promotion to the highest league, with Lexerød being among the people credited for developing several players to their first team as well as youth national teams. In November 2010 Lexerød was announced as the new director of sports in Kvik Halden. Two years later he was announced as their new manager, succeeding Ørjan Christiansen.

On 1 August 2014, before Kvik Halden's season was over, Lexerød was announced as the new head coach of the Norwegian women's national U19 team, succeeding Jarl Torske. After contesting the 2019 UEFA Women's Under-19 Championship, he left to take over the Norwegian women's national U23 team.

Lexwerød was also mentioned in discussions to take over the Norwegian women's national team in both 2016, 2022 and 2023. However, he went straight from Norway U23 to being announced as the new manager of Vålerenga Fotball Damer in January 2022. He led the team to back-to-back Toppserien titles in 2023 and 2024. In 2024 he was awarded as Coach of the Year in Toppserien. Moreover, he led Vålerenga to the 2024–25 UEFA Women's Champions League group stage.
