= 2011 Norwegian First Division (women) =

1. divisjon
- Season: 2011
- Champions: Vålerenga
- Promoted: Vålerenga; Fart
- Relegated: Haugar; Manglerud Star
- Matches played: 110
- Goals scored: 396 (3.6 per match)

The 2011 1. divisjon (women) season kicked off on 25 April 2011, and the final round was played on 23 October 2011.

Vålerenga were promoted to the 2011 Toppserien as 1. divisjon winners, along with Fart who finished second. This was the first time Vålerenga were playing in Toppserien, while Fart returned to the top division for the first time since 2008.

Before the season started, Orkla withdrew their team, and was replaced by Alta. Manglerud Star were bankrupted 4 April 2011, and didn't play any matches.

== League table ==
Pos	Team	Pld	W	D	L	GF	GA	GD	Pts	Promotion or relegation
1	Vålerenga (C, P)	20	14	3	3	52	22	+30	45	Promotion to Toppserien
2	Fart (P)	20	13	3	4	53	25	+28	42	Promotion to Toppserien
3	Fløya	20	10	5	5	43	26	+17	35	
4	Grand Bodø	20	9	6	5	44	31	+13	33	
5	Sarpsborg 08	20	8	7	5	42	32	+10	31	
6	Avaldsnes	20	8	5	7	35	37	−2	29	
7	Fortuna	20	7	2	11	42	52	−10	23	
8	Voss	20	4	7	9	16	34	−18	19	
9	Sola	20	3	7	10	24	44	−20	16	
10	Alta	20	3	6	11	25	47	−22	15	
11	Haugar (R)	20	4	3	13	20	46	−26	15	Relegation to Second Division
12	Manglerud Star (R)	0	0	0	0	0	0	0	0 (Note: Bankrupted and didn't play any matches)	Relegation to Second Division

Source: nifs.no
Rules for classification: 1) points; 2) goal difference; 3) number of goals scored.
(C) Champions; (P) Promoted; (R) Relegated

== See also ==
- 2011 in Norwegian football
- 2011 Toppserien
