= Synne Jensen =

Norwegian footballer (born 1996)

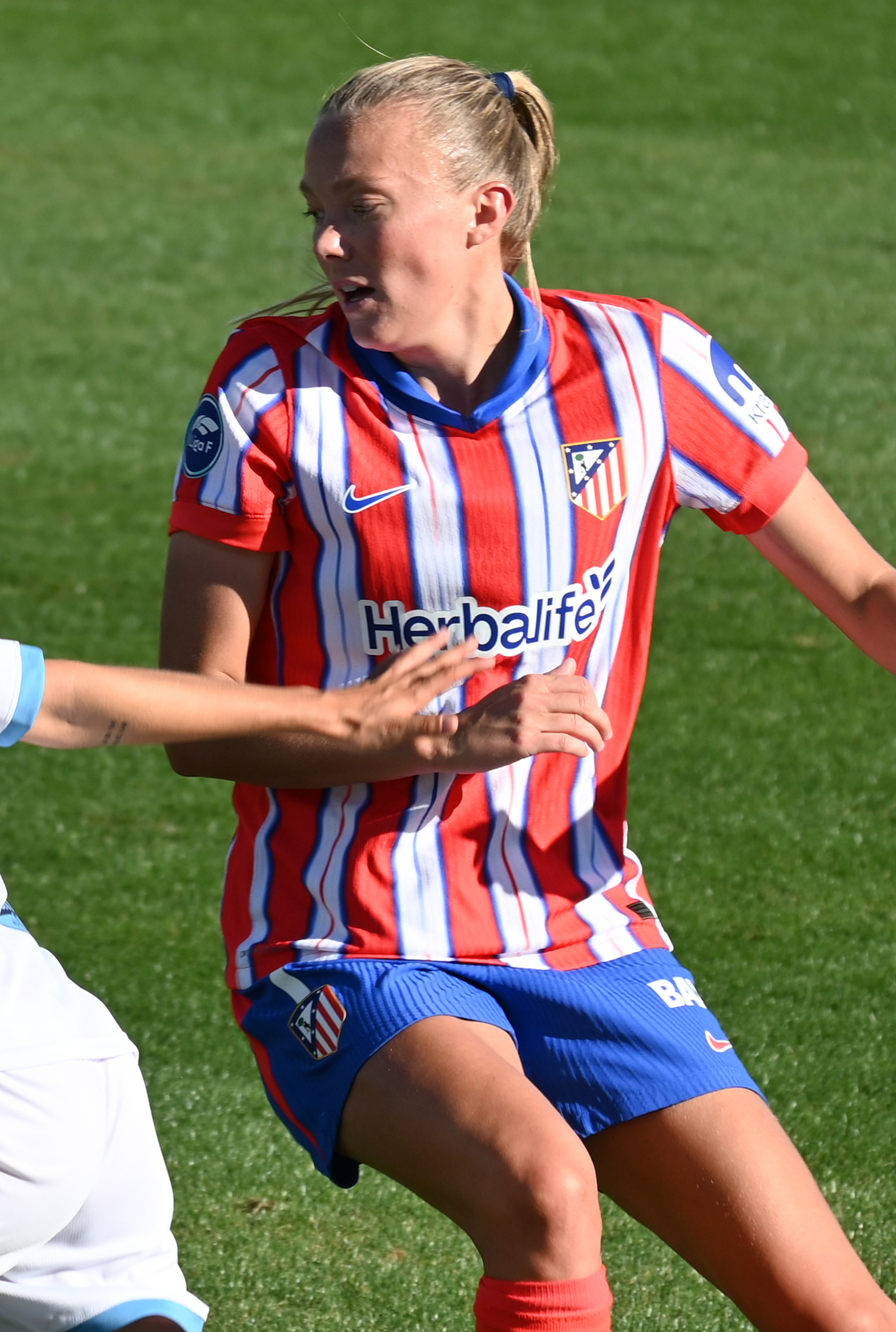
- Jensen with Atlético Madrid in 2024

Personal information
- Full name: Synne Sofie Kinden Jensen
- Date of birth: 15 February 1996 (age 30)
- Place of birth: Oslo, Norway
- Height: 1.73 m (5 ft 8 in)
- Position: Forward

Team information
- Current team: Atlético Madrid
- Number: 7

Youth career
- Gjelleråsen IF
- 2011–2012: LSK Kvinner FK

Senior career*
Years	Team	Apps	(Gls)
2012–2013	LSK Kvinner FK	21	(0)
2012	→ Linderud-Grei (loan)	10	(11)
2013–2015	Kolbotn	42	(24)
2015–2016	VfL Wolfsburg	3	(1)
2016	→ Stabæk (loan)	8	(0)
2017–2018	Stabæk	44	(9)
2019	Røa	22	(16)
2020–2022	Vålerenga	36	(13)
2022–2024	Real Sociedad	57	(24)
2024–2026	Atlético Madrid	38	(9)

International career^{‡}
2010–2011	Norway U15	5	(1)
2011–2012	Norway U16	16	(11)
2012–2013	Norway U17	10	(5)
2013–2014	Norway U19	22	(11)
2014–	Norway	38	(7)
- * Club domestic league appearances and goals as of 18:46, 28 December 2025 (UTC) ‡ National team caps and goals as of 14 October 2026

Synne Sofie Kinden Jensen (born 15 February 1996) is a Norwegian professional footballer who plays as a forward for Atlético Madrid. She made her debut for the Norway women's national team in 2014.

== Club career ==
=== Norwegian leagues, 2011–2015 ===
Jensen played for Gjelleråsen IF as a young teenager. In January 2011 at age 16, she signed with LSK Kvinner FK. She debuted for the club on 14 April 2012 during the club's 6–0 win over SK Trondheims-Ørn in the Toppserien.

In August 2012, she joined Linderud-Grei in the Norwegian First Division. Jensen made 10 appearances for the club and scored 11 goals. She returned to Lillestrøm for the 2013 season where she made eight appearances before committing to league rival Kolbotn IL. Jensen played three seasons for the club. In 2013, she scored five goals in 12 appearances. The following season, she scored 13 goals in 21 appearances. In 2015, she scored six goals in eight appearances.

=== VfL Wolfsburg, 2015–2016 ===
At the age of 19, Jensen signed a three-year contract with German club VfL Wolfsburg for the 2015–16 season of the Frauen-Bundesliga. Coach Ralf Kellermann praised her "enormous potential to develop further." On 29 August 2015 she made her competitive debut for Wolfsburg and scored a brace against Jena during the club's season opener, resulting in an 8–0 win.

In June 2016, Wolfsburg sent Jensen on loan to Stabæk for one year, to aid her development with regular first team football. At the end of the season she was allowed to return to Stabæk on a permanent basis, as part of Wolfsburg's transfer deal for Marie Dølvik Markussen.

== International career ==
After representing Norway at the youth international level, Jensen made her senior debut for Norway against New Zealand on 25 November 2014.

On 16 June 2025, Jensen was called up to the Norway squad for the UEFA Women's Euro 2025.

== International goals ==
List of international goals scored by Synne Jensen
No.	Date	Venue	Opponent	Score	Result	Competition
1.	23 January 2018	La Manga Stadium, Los Belenos, Spain	Iceland	1–1	2–1	Friendly
2.	23 January 2018	La Manga Stadium, Los Belenos, Spain	Iceland	2–1	2–1	Friendly
3.	4 March 2020	Vista Municipal Stadium, Parchal, Portugal	Denmark	2–1	2–1	2020 Algarve Cup
4.	10 March 2020	Estádio Algarve, Faro/Loulé, Portugal	New Zealand	1–1	2–1	2020 Algarve Cup
5.	3 December 2024	Ullevaal Stadion, Oslo, Norway	Northern Ireland	3–0	3–0	UEFA Women's Euro 2025 qualifying play-offs
6.	18 April 2026	Ptuj City Stadium, Ptuj, Slovenia	Slovenia	2–1	3–2	2027 FIFA Women's World Cup qualification
7.	13 October 2026	Ullevaal Stadion, Oslo, Norway	Romania	1–0	6–0	2027 FIFA Women's World Cup play-offs

== Honours ==
DFB-Pokal: Winner 2016
