= 2017 Toppserien =

Toppserien
- Season: 2017
- Champions: LSK Kvinner
- Relegated: Medkila
- Champions League: LSK Kvinner; Avaldsnes
- Matches: 132
- Goals: 433 (3.28 per match)
- Top goalscorer: Guro Reiten (18 goals)
- Biggest home win: 8 goals: LSK 9–1 GBO (7 May)
- Biggest away win: 6 goals: GBO 0–6 LSK (26 Aug)
- Highest scoring: 10 goals: LSK 9–1 GBO (7 May)
- Total attendance: 31,498
- Average attendance: 238 ▲25.3%

The 2017 Toppserien was the 34th season of the highest women's football league in Norway. LSK Kvinner entered the season as the defending champions, and claimed their fourth consecutive title, securing the crown with two rounds to spare.

== League table ==
Pos	Team	Pld	W	D	L	GF	GA	GD	Pts	Qualification or relegation
1	LSK Kvinner (C)	22	19	2	1	68	18	+50	59	Qualification for the Champions League round of 32
2	Avaldsnes	22	15	3	4	51	17	+34	48	Qualification for the Champions League qualifying round
3	Stabæk	22	13	4	5	46	23	+23	43	
4	Klepp	22	12	4	6	34	24	+10	40	
5	Røa	22	11	4	7	42	28	+14	37	
6	Arna-Bjørnar	22	9	8	5	39	28	+11	35	
7	Vålerenga	22	10	4	8	38	33	+5	34	
8	Trondheims-Ørn	22	8	6	8	36	36	0	30	
9	Sandviken	22	4	6	12	23	34	−11	18	
10	Kolbotn	22	4	3	15	17	43	−26	15	
11	Grand Bodø (O)	22	2	2	18	30	80	−50	8	Qualification for the relegation play-offs
12	Medkila (R)	22	1	2	19	9	69	−60	5	Relegation to First Division

Source: Norges Fotballforbund
Rules for classification: 1) Points; 2) Goal difference; 3) Number of goals scored; 4) Head-to-head points; 5) Head-to-head goal difference; 6) Head-to-head away goals scored
(C) Champions; (O) Play-off winners; (R) Relegated

== Top scorers ==
Rank	Player	Club	Goals
1	(Norway) Guro Reiten	LSK Kvinner	18
2	(Norway) Lisa-Marie Karlseng Utland	Røa	17
3	(Norway) Sophie Haug	LSK Kvinner	15
4	(Australia) Tameka Butt	Klepp	14
5	(Norway) Anne Birkeland	Grand Bodø	11
5	(Norway) Melissa Bjånesøy	Stabæk	11
5	(Norway) Cecilie Pedersen	Avaldsnes	11
5	(Norway) Elise Thorsnes	Avaldsnes	11
9	(Norway) Marte Berget	LSK Kvinner	10
10	(Norway) Rakel Engesvik	Trondheims-Ørn	8
10	(Australia) Emily Gielnik	Avaldsnes	8
10	(Norway) Andrea Wilmann	Stabæk	8
