= Monica Knudsen =

Norwegian football coach (born 1975)

Personal information
- Full name: Monica Knudsen
- Date of birth: 25 March 1975 (age 51)
- Place of birth: Arendal, Norway
- Height: 5 ft 6 in (1.68 m)
- Position: Midfielder

Youth career
- 1985–1991: Express

Senior career*
Years	Team	Apps	(Gls)
1992	Favør		
1993–1994	FK Donn		
1995–2003	Asker		
2004	Fortuna Hjørring		
2005–2006	Team Strømmen		

International career^{‡}
1996–2003	Norway	87	(6)

Managerial career
- 2009–2016: LSK Kvinner
- 2018–2019: Vålerenga
- 2022–2023: Norway Women (assistant)
Medal record
Women's football
Representing Norway
Olympic Games
Gold medal – first place	2000 Sydney	Team
- * Club domestic league appearances and goals as of 14:16, 6 October 2014 (UTC) ‡ National team caps and goals as of 14:16, 6 October 2014 (UTC)

Monica Knudsen (born 25 March 1975) is a Norwegian football coach and former player who managed Toppserien club LSK Kvinner. As a player, Knudsen was a midfielder who won 87 caps for the Norway women's national football team between 1996 and 2003.

== Career ==
Knudsen was on the Norwegian teams that hosted UEFA Women's Euro 1997 and then finished fourth at the 1999 FIFA Women's World Cup in the United States. Knudsen won the Toppserien league with her club Asker in 1998 and 1999.

Knudsen was with the Norway team that won gold at the 2000 Summer Olympics in Sydney. She played as a substitute in the semifinal and was one of the starting eleven in Norway's 3–2 final win over the United States, being substituted after 90 minutes, before the start of extra time.

At the end of 2009 Knudsen was appointed chief trainer for LSK Kvinner FK football club.

== Personal life ==
Knudsen was born in Arendal on 25 March 1975.
