= Vålerenga Fotball Damer =

Norwegian women's football club

Vålerenga Fotball
- Full name: Vålerenga Fotball Damer
- Ground: Intility Arena; Oslo
- Capacity: 16,555
- Head coach: Nils Lexerød
- League: Toppserien
- 2026: Toppserien, 4th
- Website: www.vif-damefotball.no
Home colours	Away colours	Third colours

Vålerenga Fotball Damer is the women's football branch of Vålerenga Fotball. Based in Oslo, the Toppserien, the top division of women's football in Norway.

The team first won promotion to Toppserien in 2011 after earning promotion from the First Division. This made Vålerenga the third Norwegian club with both a men's team and a women's team in the top-tier league, and the first club to have its own women's team win promotion to Toppserien, as the two other clubs, Stabæk Fotball and Lillestrøm SK, inherited another club's women's team.

In 2020, the club made history by winning the Toppserien and the NM Kvinner, their first major titles after finishing runners-up at the previous editions.

== History ==
Founded in 1913, Vålerenga established a women's team for the first time in 1982. After several seasons in lower divisions, Vålerenga decided to make a restart in 1991. They temporarily put down their women's first team, and focused on building youth teams for the next five years. Based on the players coming through their youth teams, they restarted their women's first team in 1996 at the fifth tier of Norwegian football. They were promoted several times the following years, and played at the second tier in the 2000 season.

After spending years at the second and third tier, The team won promotion from the First Division to Toppserien in 2011. This made Vålerenga the third Norwegian club with both a men's team and a women's team in the top-tier league, and the first club to have its own women's team win promotion to Toppserien, as the two other clubs, Stabæk Fotball and Lillestrøm SK, inherited another club's women's team.

In the following years, Vålerenga established itself at the top tier of Norwegian football. In 2015, the board of Vålerenga Fotball stated that by 2020 the club should be a leading club in women's football.

After playing indoors in Vallhall Arena for several years, Vålerenga moved into the newly built Intility Arena in 2017. The first match played at the stadium was the Toppserien game against Kolbotn, which Vålerenga won 2–0. In 2017 they also reached the Norwegian Cup Final for the first time, which they lost 0–1 to Avaldsnes.

In 2020, the club won the Double, winning both the Toppserien and the NM Kvinner for the first time in the club's history. They won 2–0 against LSK Kvinner in the Cup Final, and were also ending LSK Kvinner's streak of six consecutive league titles. In 2023, Vålerenga won their second league title.

Vålerenga qualified for the UEFA Women's Champions League group stage for the first time in the 2024–25 season.

== Players ==
=== Current squad ===
As of 24 June 2026

Note: Flags indicate national team as defined under FIFA eligibility rules; some limited exceptions apply. Players may hold more than one non-FIFA nationality.

No.	Pos.	Nation	Player
1	GK	SWE	Tove Enblom (captain)
2	DF	NOR	Sara Hørte
4	DF	NOR	Iselin Sandnes Olsen
5	DF	NOR	Selma Pettersen
6	MF	NOR	Noor Eckhoff
7	MF	SUI	Naina Inauen
8	MF	SWE	Linn Vickius
10	MF	AUS	Hana Lowry
11	FW	NOR	Marie Moen Preus
17	MF	SWE	Ronja Aronsson
18	MF	DEN	Matilde Lundorf
20	FW	NOR	Tuva Espås
21	FW	NOR	Karina Sævik
22	MF	NOR	Tomine Enger

No.	Pos.	Nation	Player
23	MF	NOR	Eline Hegg
24	GK	NOR	Pia Grinde-Hansen
25	DF	NOR	Synne Skinnes Hansen
27	DF	NOR	Lina Klech
28	DF	ISL	Arna Eiríksdóttir
30	MF	NOR	Stine Brekken
31	GK	DEN	Liva Petersson
32	MF	NOR	Linnea Wang
—	GK	ISL	Fanney Birkisdóttir
—	MF	FIN	Katariina Kosola
—	DF	AUS	Tijan McKenna
—	GK	NOR	Selma Myra Pettersen
—	FW	NOR	Live Kristine Onsrud Balmforth

=== Coaching staff ===
Position	Name
Director of football	Steinar Pedersen
Head coach	Nils Lexerød
Assistant coach	Aleksander Olsen
Goalkeeper coach	Andreas Thorsen Schoute
Player developer	Tove Tuntland
Fitness coach	Luciano Arias
Head of medical	Helene Moa
Physio	Siri Nesheim
Equipment manager	Henning Aamodt
Equipment manager	Jon-Anders Schyberg
Equipment manager	Heidi Øverland

=== Notable former players ===
- (Norway) Hanne Mellingsæter
- (Norway) Solveig Gulbrandsen
- (Norway) Tina Wulf
- (Norway) Johanne Fridlund
- (Norway) Ingrid Søndenå
- (Norway) Maren Hauge
- (Denmark) Theresa Eslund
- (Finland) Tinja-Riikka Korpela
- (England) Jenna Dear
- (England) Natasha Dowie
- (Norway) Ingrid Schjelderup
- (Norway) Isabell Herlovsen
- (Cameroon) Ajara Njoya
- (Netherlands) Sherida Spitse
- (Norway) Sigrid Heien Hansen
- (Norway) Celin Bizet Ildhusøy
- (Norway) Marie Dølvik Markussen
- (Denmark) Rikke Marie Madsen
- (Norway) Synne Jensen
- (Serbia) Dejana Stefanović
- (Norway) Andrine Tomter
- (Denmark) Stine Ballisager Pedersen
- (Iceland) Ingibjörg Sigurðardóttir
- (Norway) Guro Pettersen
- (United States) Jalen Tompkins
- (Norway) Mimmi Löfwenius
- (Denmark) Janni Thomsen
- (Norway) Thea Bjelde

== Managers ==
Period	Manager
2005–2007	(Norway) Kjell Gustad
2008	(Norway) Arne Berger
2009–2013	(Norway) Cecilie Berg-Hansen
2014	(Norway) Glenn Rostad
2015	(Norway) Leif Tsolis
2016	(Belgium) David Brocken
2016–2017	(Norway) Kjell Gustad
2018–2019	(Norway) Monica Knudsen
2020–2021	(Denmark) Jack Majgaard Jensen
2022–present	(Norway) Nils Lexerød

== Recent seasons ==
Season		Pos.	Pl.	W	D	L	GS	GA	P	Cup	Notes
2010	1. divisjon	3	22	11	6	5	38	24	39	Second round	
2011	1. divisjon	↑ 1	20	14	3	3	52	22	45	Third round	Promoted to Toppserien
2012	Toppserien	8	22	6	5	11	27	47	23	Third round	
2013	Toppserien	5	22	8	8	6	41	37	32	Semi-final	
2014	Toppserien	7	22	9	3	10	27	45	30	Third round	
2015	Toppserien	10	22	6	3	13	22	42	21	Third round	
2016	Toppserien	9	22	6	5	11	25	48	23	Third round	
2017	Toppserien	7	22	10	4	8	38	33	34	Final	
2018	Toppserien	6	22	10	3	9	37	35	33	Quarter-final	
2019	Toppserien	2	22	14	4	4	41	24	46	Final	
2020	Toppserien	1	18	11	5	2	39	14	38	Winners	
2021	Toppserien	4	18	11	2	5	46	17	35	Winners	
2022	Toppserien	2	18	12	3	3	48	12	39	Quarter-final	
2022	Toppserien	2	6	4	1	1	16	3	15	Quarter-final	
2023	Toppserien	1	27	17	8	2	68	28	59	Final	
2024	Toppserien	1	27	24	1	2	74	17	73	Winners	
2025	Toppserien	2	27	22	1	4	73	19	67	Winners	
2026	Toppserien	4	22	14	2	6	55	26	44	Quarter-final	

== Honours ==
- Toppserien:
  - Winners: 2020, 2023, 2024
  - Runners-up: 2019, 2022, 2025
- 1. divisjon:
  - Winners: 2011
- Norwegian Women's Cup:
  - Winners: 2020, 2021, 2024, 2025
  - Runners-up: 2017, 2019, 2023
