= Avaldsnes IL =

Norwegian sports club

- Full name: Avaldsnes Idrettslag
- Founded: 16 June 1937; 88 years ago
- Ground: Avaldsnes Idrettssenter
- Capacity: 1,000
- League: Toppserien (women); Fourth Division (men)
- 2023: Toppserien, 9th of 10 (relegated)
Home colours	Away colours

Avaldsnes Idrettslag is a Norwegian sports club from Avaldsnes, Karmøy, Rogaland. It was founded on 16 June 1937. The club has sections for football and handball.

== Women's football ==
The women's team began play in 1989, winning the 1st Division of West Norway in 1997, before the team was dissolved in 1999 and then resurrected in 2002. The women's football team currently plays in the Toppserien, the first tier of Norwegian women's football, after promotion from the First Division in 2012, becoming the first club from Karmøy to play in the top league of any sport in Norway. They reached the final of the Norwegian Women's Cup in 2013 and 2015 but lost in the final both times.

The footballer Cecilie Pedersen has previously represented Norway while playing for Avaldsnes.

They finished the 2015 season in second place, their highest finish in the Toppserien to date, and qualified to the 2016–17 UEFA Women's Champions League.

=== Women's football squad ===
As of 8 December 2021

Note: Flags indicate national team as defined under FIFA eligibility rules; some limited exceptions apply. Players may hold more than one non-FIFA nationality.

No.	Pos.	Nation	Player
1	GK	NOR	Siri Ervik
3	DF	BRA	Giovanna Santos
5	DF	GHA	Susan Ama Duah
6	MF	NOR	Cille Nilsen
7	FW	USA	Sydney Blomquist
10	MF	GHA	Evelyn Badu
12	GK	NOR	Synne Danielsen
14	MF	NOR	Sandra Østenstad
15	MF	NOR	Ida Mortensen Natvik

No.	Pos.	Nation	Player
16	MF	CAN	Maya Ladhani
17	DF	NOR	Hanna Dahl
18	FW	NOR	Kristina Svandal
19	DF	NOR	Selma Løvås
20	DF	NOR	Kaja Olsen
23	MF	NOR	Malin Johannesen
25	MF	NOR	Marion Haugland
27	DF	NOR	Emma Endresen

=== Honours ===
- Toppserien
  - Runners-up (3): 2015, 2016, 2017
- Norwegian Women's Cup
  - Winners (1): 2017
  - Runners-up (2): 2013, 2015

=== Recent women's seasons ===
Season		Pos.	Pl.	W	D	L	GS	GA	P	Cup	Notes
2009	D2	5	18	7	3	8	43	54	24	Not Qualified	
2010	D2	↑ 1	22	17	2	3	116	42	53	Not Qualified	Promoted to Division 1
2011	D1	6	20	8	5	7	35	37	29	2nd round	
2012	D1	↑ 1	22	20	1	1	73	20	61	3rd round	Promoted to Toppserien
2013	TS	4	22	10	3	9	39	33	33	Runners-up	Lost Cup final to Stabæk 1–0
2014	TS	5	22	12	2	8	56	27	38	Semi-final	
2015	TS	2	22	16	3	3	60	15	51	Runners-up	Lost Cup final to LSK Kvinner 3–2
2016	TS	2	22	18	2	2	50	17	56	Quarter-final	
2017	TS	2	22	15	3	4	51	17	48	Winners	Beat Vålerenga 1–0 in the final to win the Cup
2018	TS	9	22	5	6	11	24	38	21	3rd round	
2019	TS	5	22	9	7	6	40	33	34	Quarter-final	
2020	TS	3	18	10	4	4	31	21	34	Semi-final	
2021	TS	8	18	3	3	12	25	35	12	Quarter-final	
2022	Toppserien	9	18	3	2	13	15	50	11	Quarter-final	
2022	Toppserien	6	7	2	1	4	7	19	7	Quarter-final	
2023	TS	9	27	5	6	16	18	63	21	3rd round	

=== UEFA Competition Record ===
Competition	Round	Club	Away	Home	Aggregate
2016-2017	Qualifying round	(Northern Ireland) Newry City	11–0	–	–
2016-2017	Qualifying round	(Portugal) CF Benfica	6–1	–	–
2016-2017	Qualifying round	(Finland) PK-35 Vantaa (Host)	2–0	–	–
2016-2017	Round of 32	(France) Lyon	0–5	2–5 ^{a}	2–10
2017–2018	Qualifying round	(Montenegro) Breznica Pljevlja (Host)	2–1	–	–
2017–2018	Qualifying round	(Israel) Kiryat Gat	6–2	–	–
2017–2018	Qualifying round	(Serbia) Spartak Subotica	2–0	–	–
2017–2018	Round of 32	(Spain) Barcelona	0–2	0–4 ^{a}	0–6
2018-2019	Qualifying round	(Portugal) Sporting CP	3–2	–	–
2018-2019	Qualifying round	(North Macedonia) Dragon 2014	3–0	–	–
2018-2019	Qualifying round	(Croatia) Osijek (Host)	2–2	–	–
2018-2019	Round of 32	(France) Lyon	0–5	0–2 ^{a}	0–7

^{a} First leg.

== Men's football ==
The men's football team currently plays in the Fourth Division, the fifth tier of Norwegian football, after relegation in 2012. The men's team also played in the Third Division between 2005 and 2010.
