= Norway women's national under-19 football team =

Youth football team representing Norway

Norway Women's U-19
- Association: Football Association of Norway (Norges Fotballforbund)
- Confederation: UEFA (Europe)
- Head coach: Lena Tyriberget
- Most caps: Kristine Minde (40)
- Top scorer: Melissa Bjånesøy (28)
- FIFA code: NOR
First colours	Second colours

UEFA Women's Under-19 Championship
- Appearances: 12 (first in 1998)
- Best result: Runners-up (2001, 2003, 2008, 2011)

FIFA U-20 Women's World Cup
- Appearances: 2 (first in 2008)
- Best result: Quarter-final 2012

The Norway women's national under-19 football team represents Norway at the UEFA Women's Under-19 Championship and the FIFA U-20 Women's World Cup.

== History ==
=== UEFA Women's Under-19 Championship ===
The Norwegian team has qualified for the UEFA Women's Under-19 Championship finals on 16 occasions, reaching the final four times.

Year	Result	Matches	Wins	Draws*	Losses	GF	GA
Two-legged final 1998	Quarter-finals	2	0	0	2	3	5
(Sweden) 1999	Fourth place	3	0	1	2	2	4
(France) 2000	did not qualify						
(Norway) 2001	Runners-up	2	1	0	1	3	3
(Sweden) 2002	Group stage	3	1	0	2	4	7
(Germany) 2003	Runners-up	5	2	2	1	8	8
(Finland) 2004	Group stage	3	1	1	1	2	3
(Hungary) 2005	did not qualify						
(Switzerland) 2006	did not qualify						
(Iceland) 2007	Semi-finals	4	2	0	2	7	6
(France) 2008	Runners-up	5	1	2	2	4	5
(Belarus) 2009	Group stage	3	0	2	1	1	2
(North Macedonia) 2010	did not qualify						
(Italy) 2011	Runners-up	5	3	0	2	13	14
(Turkey) 2012	did not qualify						
(Wales) 2013	Group stage	3	1	0	2	5	6
(Norway) 2014	Semi-finals	4	2	1	1	7	3
(Israel) 2015	Group stage	3	1	1	1	2	4
(Slovakia) 2016	Group stage	3	1	1	1	1	1
(Northern Ireland) 2017	did not qualify						
(Switzerland) 2018	Semi-finals	4	2	0	2	4	5
(Scotland) 2019	Group stage	3	1	1	1	7	8
(Georgia (country)) ~~2020~~	Cancelled due to the COVID-19 pandemic						
(Belarus) ~~2021~~	Cancelled due to the COVID-19 pandemic						
(Czech Republic) 2022	Runners-up	5	3	0	2	6	7
(Belgium) 2023	did not qualify						
(Lithuania) 2024	did not qualify						
(Poland) 2025	did not qualify						
(Bosnia and Herzegovina) 2026	did not qualify						
(Hungary) 2027	TBD						
Total	17/26	60	22	12	26	79	91

=== FIFA U-20 Women's World Cup ===
Year	Result	Matches	Wins	Draws*	Losses	GF	GA
(Canada) 2002	did not qualify						
(Thailand) 2004	did not qualify						
(Russia) 2006	did not qualify						
(Chile) 2008	Group stage	3	1	0	2	4	7
(Germany) 2010	did not qualify						
(Japan) 2012	Quarter final	4	2	0	2	8	10
(Canada) 2014	did not qualify						
(Papua New Guinea) 2016	did not qualify						
(France) 2018	did not qualify						
(Costa Rica) 2022	did not qualify						
(Colombia) 2024	did not qualify						
(Poland) 2026	did not qualify						
Total	2/12	7	3	0	4	12	17

== Current squad ==
The following 20 players were named to the squad to take part in the 2022 UEFA Women's Under-19 Championship qualification section in October 2021.

Head coach: Hege Riise

No.	Pos.	Player	Date of birth (age)	Club
1	GK	Selma Panengstuen	5 March 2003 (age 23)	(Norwegian Football Federation) Stabæk
12	GK	Benedicte Lund Berge	5 March 2003 (age 23)	(Norwegian Football Federation) AaFK Fortuna
2	DF	Thea Helene Gammelgaard Sørbo	28 March 2003 (age 23)	(Norwegian Football Federation) Kolbotn
3	DF	Helle Olsen Rindal	6 June 2004 (age 22)	(Norwegian Football Federation) AaFK Fortuna
4	DF	Tora Ose	10 May 2003 (age 23)	(Norwegian Football Federation) Arna-Bjørnar
5	DF	Selma Løvås	4 November 2003 (age 23)	(Norwegian Football Federation) Avaldsnes IL
13	DF	Emma Braut Brunes	16 October 2003 (age 23)	(Norwegian Football Federation) Klepp IL
18	DF	Casandra Lüthcke	8 January 2003 (age 23)	(Norwegian Football Federation) LSK Kvinner FK
6	MF	Ingeborg Lye Skretting	9 January 2003 (age 23)	(Norwegian Football Federation) Klepp IL
7	MF	Stine Nybø Brekken	19 December 2004 (age 21)	(Norwegian Football Federation) Vålerenga
8	MF	Julie Aune Jorde	16 April 2004 (age 22)	(Norwegian Football Federation) Lyn
14	MF	Irene Dirdal	22 September 2003 (age 23)	(Norwegian Football Federation) Avaldsnes IL
16	MF	Oda Mathilde Johansen	28 July 2004 (age 22)	(Norwegian Football Federation) LSK Kvinner FK
20	MF	Cathinka Friis Tandberg	18 June 2004 (age 22)	(Norwegian Football Federation) Lyn
9	FW	Iris Omarsdottir	12 July 2003 (age 23)	(Norwegian Football Federation) Stabæk
10	FW	Linnéa Solvoll Laupstad	10 July 2003 (age 23)	(Norwegian Football Federation) Arna-Bjørnar
11	FW	Thea Kyvåg	9 January 2004 (age 22)	(Norwegian Football Federation) LSK Kvinner FK
15	FW	Ina Birkelund	31 May 2004 (age 22)	(Norwegian Football Federation) IF Fløya
17	FW	Kristina Svandal	3 April 2004 (age 22)	(Norwegian Football Federation) Avaldsnes IL
19	FW	Synne Amdahl Brønstad	21 June 2003 (age 23)	(Norwegian Football Federation) Rosenborg

=== Coaches ===
- Terje Liknes (1997–1999)
- Trine Lise Andersen (1999–2000)
- Jarl Torske (2001–2014)
- Nils Lexerød (2014–2019)
- Alexander Straus (2019–2021)
- Hege Riise (2021–2022)
- Lena Tyriberget (2022–present)

== See also ==
- Norway women's national football team
- Norway women's national under-17 football team
- FIFA U-20 Women's World Cup
- UEFA Women's Under-19 Championship
