= 2026–27 UEFA Women's Europa Cup qualifying rounds =

Football tournament qualification stage

The 2026–27 UEFA Women's Europa Cup qualifying rounds began on 26 August and ended on 30 September 2026.

A total of 44 teams competed in the qualifying rounds of the 2026–27 UEFA Women's Europa Cup, which included two rounds. The 16 winners in the second qualifying round advanced to the knockout phase.

Times are CEST (UTC+2), as listed by UEFA (local times, if different, are in parentheses).

== Teams ==
The qualifying stage consisted of the following rounds:

- First qualifying round (24 teams): 13 teams which entered in this round, seven third-placed teams from the Women's Champions League second qualifying round (Champions Path) mini-tournaments, and four third-placed teams from the Women's Champions League second qualifying round (League Path) mini-tournaments.
- Second qualifying round (32 teams): 12 winners of the first qualifying round, seven runners-up from the Women's Champions League second qualifying round (Champions Path) mini-tournaments, four runners-up from the Women's Champions League second qualifying round (League Path) mini-tournaments, four losers from the Women's Champions League third qualifying round (Champions Path) and five losers from the Women's Champions League third qualifying round (League Path).

Below are the participating teams (with their 2026 UEFA club coefficients), grouped by the starting rounds.

Key to colours
Winners of the second qualifying round will advance to knockout phase

Second qualifying round
Team	Coeff.
(Germany) VfL Wolfsburg	73.000
(Germany) Eintracht Frankfurt	28.000
(Austria) St. Pölten	26.000
(Sweden) Hammarby IF	23.500
(Czech Republic) Sparta Prague	21.000
(Norway) Brann	21.000
(Netherlands) Ajax	20.500
(Spain) Real Sociedad	14.999
(Portugal) Sporting CP	13.000
(Greece) PAOK	8.000
(Slovakia) Spartak Myjava	6.000
(Sweden) Malmö FF	5.933
(Netherlands) PSV Eindhoven	5.500
(Romania) Farul Constanța	4.500
(Scotland) Rangers	4.000
(Scotland) Heart of Midlothian	2.550
(Turkey) Fenerbahçe	2.500
(Finland) HJK	2.000
(Kazakhstan) Aktobe	2.000
(Poland) Czarni Sosnowiec	1.600

First qualifying round
Team	Coeff.
(Norway) Vålerenga	21.000
(Iceland) Breiðablik	15.000
(Cyprus) Apollon Ladies	12.000
(Belgium) Anderlecht	11.500
(Bosnia and Herzegovina) SFK 2000	11.000
(Lithuania) Gintra	10.500
(Belarus) FC Minsk	9.000
(Serbia) Spartak Subotica	9.000
(Ukraine) Metalist 1925 Kharkiv	9.000
(Norway) Rosenborg	8.500
(Denmark) Fortuna Hjørring	7.500
(Portugal) Torreense	7.400
(Netherlands) Feyenoord	5.333
(Denmark) Brøndby	4.500
(Austria) Sturm Graz	4.000
(Kosovo) Mitrovica	4.000
(Czech Republic) Slovan Liberec	3.299
(Ukraine) Kolos Kovalivka	3.000
(Ukraine) SeaSters Odesa	3.000
(Iceland) FH	2.700
(Slovenia) Radomlje	2.500
(Croatia) Agram	1.900
(Croatia) Hajduk Split	1.900
(Romania) Csíkszereda	1.800

Notes

1. ^{CH Q3} Losers of Champions League third qualifying round (Champions Path).
2. ^{CH Q2 RU} Runners-up of Champions League second qualifying round (Champions Path).
3. ^{CH Q2 TP} Third place of Champions League second qualifying round (Champions Path).
4. ^{LP Q3} Losers of Champions League third qualifying round (League Path).
5. ^{LP Q2 RU} Runners-up of Champions League second qualifying round (League Path).
6. ^{LP Q2 TP} Third place of Champions League second qualifying round (League Path).

== Schedule ==
The schedule of the competition was as follows.

Schedule for 2026–27 UEFA Women's Europa Cup qualifying rounds
Round	Draw date	First leg	Second leg
First qualifying round	11 August 2026	26 and 29 August 2026	1–2 September 2026
Second qualifying round	4 September 2026	23 September 2026	30 September 2026

== First qualifying round ==
=== Seeding ===
The draw for the first qualifying round was held on 11 August 2026.

A total of 24 teams competed in the first qualifying round. Seeding of teams was based on their 2026 UEFA club coefficients. Before the draw, UEFA divided the teams into one group of six seeded and six unseeded teams and one another group of six seeded and six unseeded teams per the principles set by the UEFA Women's Football Committee. Teams were drawn into two-legged-ties, where the first drawn team played the first leg at home. Teams from the same association could not be drawn against each other. Due to political reasons, teams from the following associations could not be drawn into the same group: Kosovo / Bosnia and Herzegovina; Kosovo / Serbia; Ukraine / Belarus.

Group 1		Group 2	
Seeded	Unseeded	Seeded	Unseeded
(Norway) Vålerenga; (Cyprus) Apollon Ladies; (Lithuania) Gintra; (Belarus) FC Minsk; (Ukraine) Metalist 1925 Kharkiv; (Denmark) Fortuna Hjørring	(Austria) Sturm Graz; (Kosovo) Mitrovica; (Iceland) FH; (Slovenia) Radomlje; (Croatia) Agram; (Croatia) Hajduk Split	(Iceland) Breiðablik; (Belgium) Anderlecht; (Bosnia and Herzegovina) SFK 2000; (Serbia) Spartak Subotica; (Norway) Rosenborg; (Portugal) Torreense	(Netherlands) Feyenoord; (Denmark) Brøndby; (Czech Republic) Slovan Liberec; (Ukraine) Kolos Kovalivka; (Ukraine) SeaSters Odesa; (Romania) Csíkszereda

=== Summary ===
The first legs were played on 26 and 29 August, and the second legs on 1 and 2 September 2026. The winners of the ties advanced to the second qualifying round.

First qualifying round
Team 1	Agg.	Team 2	1st leg	2nd leg
FC Minsk (Belarus)	1–0	(Croatia) Agram	0–0	1–0
Hajduk Split (Croatia)	1–3	(Denmark) Fortuna Hjørring	0–2	1–1
Radomlje (Slovenia)	1–9	(Norway) Vålerenga	0–2	1–7
Apollon Ladies (Cyprus)	1–2	(Iceland) FH	0–2	1–0
Mitrovica (Kosovo)	0–5	(Ukraine) Metalist 1925 Kharkiv	0–0	0–5
Sturm Graz (Austria)	7–4	(Lithuania) Gintra	2–1	5–3
Torreense (Portugal)	9–2	(Ukraine) Kolos Kovalivka	6–1	3–1
SFK 2000 (Bosnia and Herzegovina)	3–4	(Czech Republic) Slovan Liberec	2–3	1–1
Breiðablik (Iceland)	9–1	(Romania) Csíkszereda	8–1	1–0
SeaSters Odesa (Ukraine)	1–3	(Norway) Rosenborg	1–0	0–3
Anderlecht (Belgium)	3–4	(Netherlands) Feyenoord	2–1	1–3
Spartak Subotica (Serbia)	1–9	(Denmark) Brøndby	0–5	1–4

=== Matches ===
29 August 2026
17:00

FC Minsk (Belarus)	0–0	(Croatia) Agram
	Report

Municipal Stadium, Mosonmagyaróvár, Hungary (Note: Due to the country's involvement in the Russian invasion of Ukraine, Belarusian teams were required to play their home matches at neutral venues and behind closed doors until further notice.)
Attendance: 20
Referee: Nanna Løf Andersen (Denmark)
2 September 2026
17:00

Agram (Croatia)	0–1	(Belarus) FC Minsk
	Report	Vlasenko 51'

Sport Centre Rudes, Zagreb
Attendance: 300
Referee: Alexandra Collin (France)

FC Minsk won 1–0 on aggregate.

26 August 2026
17:30

Hajduk Split (Croatia)	0–2	(Denmark) Fortuna Hjørring
	Report	Valvik 28', 66'

Pokraj Jadra Solin, Solin
Attendance: 410
Referee: Emily Heaslip (England)
2 September 2026
18:00

Fortuna Hjørring (Denmark)	1–1	(Croatia) Hajduk Split
Valvik 70'	Report	Vlajčević 84'

Hjørring Stadion, Hjørring
Attendance: 407
Referee: Michaela Pachtová (Czech Republic)

Fortuna Hjørring won 3–1 on aggregate.

26 August 2026
17:00

Radomlje (Slovenia)	0–2	(Norway) Vålerenga
	Report	Hegg 64'; Inauen 90+5'

Športni park Radomlje, Radomlje
Attendance: 311
Referee: Olivia Tschon (Austria)
2 September 2026
18:45

Vålerenga (Norway)	7–1	(Slovenia) Radomlje
Arnesen 21', 25'; Lowry 39'; Preus 51', 87'; Klech 73'; Brekken 79'	Report	Kastelec 45+3'

Vålerenga Stadion, Oslo
Attendance: 526
Referee: Miriama Bočková (Slovakia)

Vålerenga won 9–1 on aggregate.

26 August 2026
17:00 (18:00 UTC+3)

Apollon Ladies (Cyprus)	0–2	(Iceland) FH
	Report	Errington 37'; Hauksdóttir 43'

Stelios Kyriakides Stadium, Paphos
Attendance: 170
Referee: Jelena Medjedović (Serbia)
2 September 2026
18:00 (16:00 UTC)

FH (Iceland)	0–1	(Cyprus) Apollon Ladies
	Report	Freda 10'

Kaplakrikavöllur, Hafnarfjörður
Attendance: 537
Referee: Rasa Grigonė (Lithuania)

FH won 2–1 on aggregate.

26 August 2026
17:00

Mitrovica (Kosovo)	0–0	(Ukraine) Metalist 1925 Kharkiv
	Report

Zahir Pajaziti Stadium, Podujevë
Attendance: 202
Referee: Aleksandra Česen (Slovenia)
1 September 2026
13:00

Metalist 1925 Kharkiv (Ukraine)	5–0	(Kosovo) Mitrovica
Apanashchenko 8'; Hiryn 18', 69'; Basanska 47'; Khimych 59'	Report

FFM Training Centre, Skopje, North Macedonia (Note: Due to the Russian invasion of Ukraine, Ukrainian teams were required to play their home matches at neutral venues until further notice.)
Attendance: 48
Referee: Eugenia Gil Soriano (Spain)

Metalist 1925 Kharkiv won 5–0 on aggregate.

26 August 2026
19:00

Sturm Graz (Austria)	2–1	(Lithuania) Gintra
Breznik 81', 90+4'	Report	Pereviznyk 20'

Stadion Graz-Liebenau, Graz
Attendance: 1,044
Referee: Maika Vanderstichel (France)
2 September 2026
11:00 (12:00 UTC+3)

Gintra (Lithuania)	3–5	(Austria) Sturm Graz
Pereviznyk 6', 14'; Mideva 8'	Report	Pulins 3', 53' (pen.); Sipos 26'; Yancey 33' (o.g.); Gerasymchuk 45+1' (o.g.)

Šiauliai Central Stadium, Šiauliai
Attendance: 350
Referee: Anastasia Mylopoulou (Greece)

Sturm Graz won 7–4 on aggregate.

26 August 2026
21:00 (20:00 UTC+1)

Torreense (Portugal)	6–1	(Ukraine) Kolos Kovalivka
Hayes 8'; Mendoza 24'; Konst 35', 54', 90+1'; Semkiv 86' (o.g.)	Report	Konovalova 58'

SC Uniao Torreense sporting complex, Torres Vedras
Attendance: 1,073
Referee: Lotta Vuorio (Finland)
2 September 2026
17:00

Kolos Kovalivka (Ukraine)	1–3	(Portugal) Torreense
Semkiv 67'	Report	Weimer 9', 46'; Bruna Ramos 80'

Stal Stalowa Wola Stadium, Stalowa Wola, Poland
Attendance: 50
Referee: Kristina Georgieva (Bulgaria)

Torreense won 9–2 on aggregate.

26 August 2026
17:00

SFK 2000 (Bosnia and Herzegovina)	2–3	(Czech Republic) Slovan Liberec
Spasojević 65'; Kamerić 82'	Report	Krejčířová 13'; Vithová 47'; Skálová 57'

Bosnia and Herzegovina FA Training Centre, Zenica
Attendance: 300
Referee: Shona Shukrula (Netherlands)
2 September 2026
17:00

Slovan Liberec (Czech Republic)	1–1	(Bosnia and Herzegovina) SFK 2000
Ferencová 79'	Report	Jusufović 58'

Stadion u Nisy, Liberec
Attendance: 1,480
Referee: Hristiyana Guteva (Bulgaria)

Slovan Liberec won 4–3 on aggregate.

26 August 2026
19:30 (17:30 UTC)

Breiðablik (Iceland)	8–1	(Romania) Csíkszereda
Úlfarsdóttir 6', 9'; Sigurðardóttir 25', 47', 52'; Van Bemmel 26'; Árnadóttir 42'; Halldórsdóttir 54'	Report	Balázs 79'

Kópavogsvöllur, Kópavogur
Attendance: 268
Referee: Sofia Prychyna (Ukraine)
2 September 2026
18:00 (19:00 UTC+3)

Csíkszereda (Romania)	0–1	(Iceland) Breiðablik
	Report	Duong 55'

Stadion Municipal Miercurea Ciuc, Miercurea Ciuc
Attendance: 650
Referee: Franziska Wildfeuer (Germany)

Breiðablik won 9–1 on aggregate.

26 August 2026
17:00 (18:00 UTC+3)

SeaSters Odesa (Ukraine)	1–0	(Norway) Rosenborg
Kalinina 57'	Report

Nisporeni Central, Nisporeni, Moldova
Attendance: 124
Referee: Déborah Anex (Switzerland)
2 September 2026
18:00

Rosenborg (Norway)	3–0	(Ukraine) SeaSters Odesa
Dirdal 48'; Revees 77'; Nergård 86'	Report

Koteng Arena, Trondheim
Attendance: 484
Referee: Kirsty Dowle (England)

Rosenborg won 3–1 on aggregate.

26 August 2026
19:00

Anderlecht (Belgium)	2–1	(Netherlands) Feyenoord
Wijnants 3'; Jonušaitė 69'	Report	Van de Lavoir 55'

Burgemeester Van De Wiele stadion, Deinze
Attendance: 601
Referee: Volha Blotskaya (Belarus)
2 September 2026
19:00

Feyenoord (Netherlands)	3–1	(Belgium) Anderlecht
Van de Lavoir 5'; Kroezen 10'; DellaPeruta 37' (pen.)	Report	Minnaert 23'

Sportcomplex Varkenoord, Rotterdam
Attendance: 989
Referee: Abigail Byrne (England)

Feyenoord won 4–3 on aggregate.

26 August 2026
20:00

Spartak Subotica (Serbia)	0–5	(Denmark) Brøndby
	Report	Nejmann 10'; Karlsen 20'; Pelkowski 21'; Halldórsdóttir 58'; Rasmussen 82'

Gradski Stadion, Subotica
Attendance: 300
Referee: Karoline Marie Jensen (Norway)
2 September 2026
18:00

Brøndby (Denmark)	4–1	(Serbia) Spartak Subotica
Bischoff 9'; Andersson 41', 76'; Fink 90+3'	Report	Zbiljić 81'

Brøndby Stadion, Bane 2, Brøndby
Attendance: 192
Referee: Caroline Lanssens (Belgium)

Brøndby won 9–1 on aggregate.

== Second qualifying round ==
=== Seeding ===
The draw for the second qualifying round was held on 4 September 2026.

A total of 32 teams competed in the second qualifying round. Seeding of teams was based on their 2026 UEFA club coefficients.

Teams were drawn into two-legged-ties, where the first drawn team played the first leg at home. Teams from the same association could not be drawn against each other. Prior to the draw, UEFA divided the teams into three groups of seeded and unseeded teams, in accordance with the principles set by the Club Competitions Committee. The team or pairing represented by the ball drawn first was designated as the home team for the first leg.

Group 1		Group 2		Group 3	
Seeded	Unseeded	Seeded	Unseeded	Seeded	Unseeded
(Germany) VfL Wolfsburg; (Czech Republic) Sparta Prague; (Netherlands) Ajax; (Belarus) FC Minsk; (Ukraine) Metalist 1925 Kharkiv	(Portugal) Torreense; (Romania) Farul Constanța; (Austria) Sturm Graz; (Turkey) Fenerbahçe; (Kazakhstan) Aktobe	(Austria) St. Pölten; (Norway) Vålerenga; (Iceland) Breiðablik; (Portugal) Sporting CP; (Norway) Rosenborg	(Sweden) Malmö FF; (Netherlands) Feyenoord; (Denmark) Brøndby; (Czech Republic) Slovan Liberec; (Poland) Czarni Sosnowiec	(Germany) Eintracht Frankfurt; (Sweden) Hammarby IF; (Norway) Brann; (Spain) Real Sociedad; (Greece) PAOK; (Denmark) Fortuna Hjørring	(Slovakia) Spartak Myjava; (Netherlands) PSV Eindhoven; (Scotland) Rangers; (Iceland) FH; (Scotland) Heart of Midlothian; (Finland) HJK

=== Summary ===
The first legs were played on 23 September, and the second legs on 30 September 2026. The winners of the ties advanced to the round of 16.

Second qualifying round
Team 1	Agg.	Team 2	1st leg	2nd leg
FC Minsk (Belarus)	1–5	(Turkey) Fenerbahçe	1–4	0–1
Metalist 1925 Kharkiv (Ukraine)	2–6	(Portugal) Torreense	1–2	1–4
Ajax (Netherlands)	8–1	(Kazakhstan) Aktobe	8–0	0–1
VfL Wolfsburg (Germany)	8–1	(Austria) Sturm Graz	6–1	2–0
Sparta Prague (Czech Republic)	8–1	(Romania) Farul Constanța	4–1	4–0
Brøndby (Denmark)	6–3	(Portugal) Sporting CP	4–1	2–2
St. Pölten (Austria)	0–5	(Sweden) Malmö FF	0–2	0–3
Breiðablik (Iceland)	2–7	(Poland) Czarni Sosnowiec	2–6	0–1
Feyenoord (Netherlands)	5–3	(Norway) Vålerenga	4–1	1–2
Slovan Liberec (Czech Republic)	4–5	(Norway) Rosenborg	3–1	1–4
HJK (Finland)	0–6	(Norway) Brann	0–2	0–4
Heart of Midlothian (Scotland)	0–4	(Spain) Real Sociedad	0–0	0–4
FH (Iceland)	1–5 (Note: The order of the legs was reversed after the original draw.)	(Germany) Eintracht Frankfurt	0–1	1–4
PAOK (Greece)	3–4	(Slovakia) Spartak Myjava	2–3	1–1
Hammarby IF (Sweden)	5–0	(Scotland) Rangers	2–0	3–0
PSV Eindhoven (Netherlands)	1–0	(Denmark) Fortuna Hjørring	1–0	0–0

=== Matches ===
26 September 2026
16:00

FC Minsk (Belarus)	1–4	(Turkey) Fenerbahçe
Valiuk 14'	Report	Ngah 41', 43'; Stašková 63'; Kaján 69'

Wittmann Antal park, Mosonmagyaróvár, Hungary
Referee: Tatyana Sorokopudova (Kazakhstan)
30 September 2026
19:00

Fenerbahçe (Turkey)	1–0	(Belarus) FC Minsk
Şeker 34'	Report

Yusuf Ziya Öniş Stadium, Istanbul
Attendance: 620
Referee: Olivia Tschon (Austria)

Fenerbahçe won 5–1 on aggregate.

23 September 2026
12:00

Metalist 1925 Kharkiv (Ukraine)	1–2	(Portugal) Torreense
Molodiuk 78'	Report	Lakip 37', 50'

Zimbru-2 Stadium, Chișinău, Moldova
Attendance: 65
Referee: Merima Čelik (Bosnia and Herzegovina)
30 September 2026
21:00

Torreense (Portugal)	4–1	(Ukraine) Metalist 1925 Kharkiv
Lakip 25'; Hayes 49'; Weimer 75'; Rodríguez 84'	Report	Hiryn 54'

Estádio Manuel Marques, Torres Vedras
Attendance: 643
Referee: Nanna Løf Andersen (Denmark)

Torreense won 6–2 on aggregate.

23 September 2026
19:30

Ajax (Netherlands)	8–0	(Kazakhstan) Aktobe
Spitse 11' (pen.); Snoeijs 12', 22'; Touon 33', 43', 52'; Noordermeer 74'; Van Hensbergen 81' (pen.)	Report

Sportpark De Toekomst, Ouder-Amstel
Attendance: 718
Referee: Alexandra Collin (France)
30 September 2026
16:00

Aktobe (Kazakhstan)	1–0	(Netherlands) Ajax
Rees 83'	Report

Central Stadium, Aktobe
Attendance: 4,200
Referee: Aleksandra Česen (Slovenia)

Ajax won 8–1 on aggregate.

23 September 2026
19:00

VfL Wolfsburg (Germany)	6–1	(Austria) Sturm Graz
Peddemors 10'; Prašnikar 13'; Vallotto 30'; Huth 37'; Piljić 83'; Lattwein 86'	Report	Pulins 53'

AOK Stadion, Wolfsburg
Attendance: 1,307
Referee: Frederikke Lydia Søkjær (Denmark)
30 September 2026
18:30

Sturm Graz (Austria)	0–2	(Germany) VfL Wolfsburg
	Report	Bogaert 32'; Kerim-Lindland 84'

Liebenauer Stadium, Graz
Attendance: 1,649
Referee: Emily Heaslip (England)

VfL Wolfsburg won 8–1 on aggregate.

23 September 2026
18:00

Sparta Prague (Czech Republic)	4–1	(Romania) Farul Constanța
Ospeck 26'; Bartoňová 52' (pen.); Hansen 70'; Khýrová 83'	Report	Stancu 42'

Stadion Letná, Prague
Attendance: 522
Referee: Marina Živković (Serbia)
30 September 2026
16:00

Farul Constanța (Romania)	0–4	(Czech Republic) Sparta Prague
	Report	Bergford 28'; Ospeck 48'; Rancová 69'; Huvarová 90'

Central Stadium, Ovidiu
Attendance: 328
Referee: Maika Vanderstichel (France)

Sparta Prague won 8–1 on aggregate.

23 September 2026
18:00

Brøndby (Denmark)	4–1	(Portugal) Sporting CP
Barron 12' (o.g.); Buchberg 41'; Pelkowski 66'; Brenn 70'	Report	Encarnação 61'

Brøndby Stadion, Brøndbyvester
Attendance: 347
Referee: Milica Milovanović (Serbia)
30 September 2026
20:45

Sporting CP (Portugal)	2–2	(Denmark) Brøndby
Armengol 20'; Ramírez 61'	Report	Bischoff 42'; Engesvik 85'

Estádio Aurélio Pereira, Alcochete
Attendance: 196
Referee: Fabienne Michel (Germany)

Brøndby won 6–3 on aggregate.

23 September 2026
18:45

St. Pölten (Austria)	0–2	(Sweden) Malmö FF
	Report	Skoog 20'; Milivojević 80'

NV Arena, Sankt Pölten
Attendance: 510
Referee: Filipa Pereira Cunha (Portugal)
30 September 2026
19:00

Malmö FF (Sweden)	3–0	(Austria) St. Pölten
Löfqvist 8'; Skoog 27'; D'Aquila 58'	Report

Stadion, Malmö
Attendance: 458
Referee: Rasa Grigonė (Lithuania)

Malmö FF won 5–0 on aggregate.

23 September 2026
16:00

Breiðablik (Iceland)	2–6	(Poland) Czarni Sosnowiec
Úlfarsdóttir 45+3'; Tómasdóttir 69'	Report	Miłek 21', 43', 50', 71'; Miksone 36'; Buszewska 42'

Kópavogsvöllur, Kópavogur
Attendance: 200
Referee: Karoline Wacker (Germany)
30 September 2026
19:00

Czarni Sosnowiec (Poland)	1–0	(Iceland) Breiðablik
Sarapata 58'	Report

Zagłębie Sports Park, Sosnowiec
Attendance: 2,305
Referee: Ana Maria Terteleac (Romania)

Czarni Sosnowiec won 7–2 on aggregate.

23 September 2026
19:00

Feyenoord (Netherlands)	4–1	(Norway) Vålerenga
Della Peruta 45+1', 50'; Van de Westeringh 59'; Stoit 88'	Report	Arnesen 5'

Sportcomplex Varkenoord, Rotterdam
Attendance: 828
Referee: Angelika Söder (Germany)
30 September 2026
18:00

Vålerenga (Norway)	2–1	(Netherlands) Feyenoord
Pettersen 73'; Arnesen 90+3'	Report	Stoit 87'

Intility Arena, Oslo
Attendance: 1,042
Referee: Hristiyana Guteva (Bulgaria)

Feyenoord won 5–3 on aggregate.

23 September 2026
17:00

Slovan Liberec (Czech Republic)	3–1	(Norway) Rosenborg
Truxová 33', 45+1'; Vithová 46'	Report	Revees 30'

Městský stadion, Ústí nad Labem
Attendance: 576
Referee: Gamze Durmuş (Turkey)
30 September 2026
18:00

Rosenborg (Norway)	4–1	(Czech Republic) Slovan Liberec
Nilsen 6', 14'; Fuglum 21'; Aunehaugen 85'	Report	Vithová 24'

Koteng Arena, Trondheim
Attendance: 422
Referee: Sofiya Prychyna (Ukraine)

Rosenborg won 5–4 on aggregate.

23 September 2026
17:30

HJK (Finland)	0–2	(Norway) Brann
	Report	Isaksen 63'; Lovera 70'

Töölö Football Stadium, Helsinki
Attendance: 898
Referee: Abigail Byrne (England)
30 September 2026
18:00

Brann (Norway)	4–0	(Finland) HJK
Davidson 10'; Zomers 52'; Aahjem 67', 71'	Report

Brann Stadion, Bergen
Attendance: 1,122
Referee: Eugenia Gil Soriano (Spain)

Brann won 6–0 on aggregate.

23 September 2026
20:00

Heart of Midlothian (Scotland)	0–0	(Spain) Real Sociedad
	Report

Ainslie Park, Edinburgh
Attendance: 402
Referee: Henrikke Nervik (Norway)
30 September 2026
19:00

Real Sociedad (Spain)	4–0	(Scotland) Heart of Midlothian
Camino 19'; Fernández 42' (pen.); Campo 45'; Marín 70'	Report

Estadio Zubieta, San Sebastian
Attendance: 950
Referee: Lotta Vuorio (Finland)

Real Sociedad won 4–0 on aggregate.

23 September 2026
18:00

FH (Iceland)	0–1	(Germany) Eintracht Frankfurt
	Report	Blomqvist 60' (pen.)

Kaplakriki, Hafnarfjörður
Attendance: 557
Referee: Karoline Marie Jensen (Norway)
30 September 2026
18:30

Eintracht Frankfurt (Germany)	4–1	(Iceland) FH
Mühlhaus 46'; Freigang 56'; Bennison 62'; Raso 79'	Report	Christopher 12'

Stadion am Brentanobad, Frankfurt
Attendance: 2,459
Referee: Déborah Anex (Switzerland)

Eintracht Frankfurt won 5–1 on aggregate.

23 September 2026
16:00

PAOK (Greece)	2–3	(Slovakia) Spartak Myjava
Gkouni 53'; Llopis 57'	Report	Semanová 20', 35'; Dougherty 90+2'

Makedonikos Stadium, Thessaloniki
Attendance: 250
Referee: Lizzy van der Helm (Netherlands)
30 September 2026
18:00

Spartak Myjava (Slovakia)	1–1	(Greece) PAOK
Stanović 33' (pen.)	Report	Argyriou 59'

Stadium Myjava, Myjava
Attendance: 1,670
Referee: Olga Blotskaya (Belarus)

Spartak Myjava 4–3 on aggregate.

23 September 2026
19:00

Hammarby IF (Sweden)	2–0	(Scotland) Rangers
Sørum 29'; Peterson 87'	Report

Hammarby IP, Stockholm
Attendance: 1,978
Referee: Ewa Augustyn (Poland)
30 September 2026
20:00

Rangers (Scotland)	0–3	(Sweden) Hammarby IF
	Report	Walter 14'; Hermannsdóttir 62'; Peterson 79'

Broadwood Stadium, Cumbernauld
Attendance: 410
Referee: Kristina Georgieva (Bulgaria)

Hammarby IF won 5–0 on aggregate.

23 September 2026
19:00

PSV Eindhoven (Netherlands)	1–0	(Denmark) Fortuna Hjørring
Rijsbergen 38'	Report

De Herdgang, Eindhoven
Attendance: 650
Referee: Martina Molinaro (Italy)
30 September 2026
18:00

Fortuna Hjørring (Denmark)	0–0	(Netherlands) PSV Eindhoven
	Report

Hjørring Stadium, Hjørring
Attendance: 501
Referee: Emanuela Rusta (Albania)

PSV Eindhoven 1–0 on aggregate.
