= 2026–27 UEFA Women's Europa Cup knockout phase =

The 2026–27 UEFA Women's Europa Cup knockout phase began on 28 October 2026 with the first leg of the round of 16 and end with the second leg of the final on 8 or 9 May 2027 to decide the winners of the 2026–27 UEFA Women's Europa Cup.

== Qualified teams ==
The knockout phase involved the 16 teams that qualified from the second qualifying round. The top eight teams formed four pairs while the remaining teams were placed in a single pot in the round of 16.

Entered as seeded teams
Pos	Team
1	(Germany) VfL Wolfsburg
2	(Germany) Eintracht Frankfurt
3	(Sweden) Hammarby IF
4	(Czech Republic) Sparta Prague
5	(Norway) Brann
6	(Netherlands) Ajax
7	(Spain) Real Sociedad
8	(Norway) Rosenborg

Entered as unseeded teams
Pos	Team
9	(Portugal) Torreense
10	(Slovakia) Spartak Myjava
11	(Sweden) Malmö FF
12	(Netherlands) PSV Eindhoven
13	(Netherlands) Feyenoord
14	(Denmark) Brøndby
15	(Turkey) Fenerbahçe
16	(Poland) Czarni Sosnowiec

== Format ==
Each tie in the knockout phase will be played over two legs, with each team playing one leg at home. The team that scores more goals on aggregate over the two legs advanced to the next round. If the aggregate score is level, then 30 minutes of extra time will be played (the away goals rule is not applied). If the score is still level at the end of extra time, the winners are decided by a penalty shoot-out.

== Schedule ==
The schedule of the competition is as follows.

Schedule for 2026–27 UEFA Women's Europa Cup
Round	Draw date	First leg	Second leg
Round of 16	2 October 2026	28–29 October 2026	10–11 November 2026
Quarter-finals	2 October 2026	3–4 February 2027	10–11 February 2027
Semi-finals	2 October 2026	23–24 March 2027	31 March–1 April 2027
Final	2 October 2026	1–2 May 2027	8–9 May 2027

== Bracket ==
Round of 16
(Netherlands) PSV Eindhoven	0	1	1
(Germany) Eintracht Frankfurt	2	2	4
(Spain) Real Sociedad	2	2	4
(Turkey) Fenerbahçe	0	0	0
(Norway) Brann	3	5	8
(Poland) Czarni Sosnowiec	0	1	1
(Czech Republic) Sparta Prague	2	0	2
(Portugal) Torreense	2	3	5
(Slovakia) Spartak Myjava	1	0	1
(Sweden) Hammarby IF	3	4	7
(Netherlands) Ajax	1	2	3
(Sweden) Malmö FF	2	0	2
(Norway) Rosenborg	1	0	1
(Denmark) Brøndby	1	2	3
(Germany) VfL Wolfsburg	7	3	10
(Netherlands) Feyenoord	0	0	0

Quarter-finals
(Germany) Eintracht Frankfurt
(Spain) Real Sociedad
(Norway) Brann
(Portugal) Torreense
(Sweden) Hammarby IF
(Netherlands) Ajax
(Denmark) Brøndby
(Germany) VfL Wolfsburg

Semi-finals

Final

== Round of 16 ==
The draw for the round of 16 was held on 2 October 2026.

=== Seeding ===
Seeded				Unseeded
1/2	3/4	5/6	7/8	Unseeded
(Germany) VfL Wolfsburg; (Germany) Eintracht Frankfurt	(Sweden) Hammarby IF; (Czech Republic) Sparta Prague	(Norway) Brann; (Netherlands) Ajax	(Spain) Real Sociedad; (Norway) Rosenborg	(Portugal) Torreense; (Slovakia) Spartak Myjava; (Sweden) Malmö FF; (Netherlands) PSV Eindhoven; (Netherlands) Feyenoord; (Denmark) Brøndby; (Turkey) Fenerbahçe; (Poland) Czarni Sosnowiec

=== Summary ===
The first legs were played on 28 and 29 October, and the second legs between 10 and 12 November 2026.

Round of 16
Team 1	Agg.	Team 2	1st leg	2nd leg
PSV Eindhoven (Netherlands)	1–4	(Germany) Eintracht Frankfurt	0–2	1–2
Real Sociedad (Spain)	4–0	(Turkey) Fenerbahçe	2–0	2–0
Brann (Norway)	8–1	(Poland) Czarni Sosnowiec	3–0	5–1
Sparta Prague (Czech Republic)	2–5	(Portugal) Torreense	2–2	0–3
Spartak Myjava (Slovakia)	1–7	(Sweden) Hammarby IF	1–3	0–4
Ajax (Netherlands)	3–2	(Sweden) Malmö FF	1–2	2–0
Rosenborg (Norway)	1–3	(Denmark) Brøndby	1–1	0–2
VfL Wolfsburg (Germany)	10–0	(Netherlands) Feyenoord	7–0	3–0

=== Matches ===
28 October 2026
19:00

PSV Eindhoven (Netherlands)	0–2	(Germany) Eintracht Frankfurt
	Report	Raso 2'; Freigang 14'

De Herdgang, Eindhoven
Attendance: 787
Referee: Katalin Kulcsár (Hungary)
11 November 2026
18:30

Eintracht Frankfurt (Germany)	2–1	(Netherlands) PSV Eindhoven
Ilestedt 26'; Blomqvist 59'	Report	Rijsbergen 58'

Stadion am Brentanobad, Frankfurt
Attendance: 2,665
Referee: Jelena Cvetković

Eintracht Frankfurt won 4–1 on aggregate.

28 October 2026
19:00

Real Sociedad (Spain)	2–0	(Turkey) Fenerbahçe
Maren 58'; Marín 64'	Report

Estadio Zubieta, San Sebastian
Attendance: 805
Referee: Martina Molinaro (Italy)
11 November 2026
18:00

Fenerbahçe (Turkey)	0–2	(Spain) Real Sociedad
	Report	Ndzana 2' (o.g.); Keefe 34'

Şükrü Saracoğlu Stadium, Istanbul
Attendance: 7,313
Referee: Michaela Pachtová (Czech Republic)

Real Sociedad won 4–0 on aggregate.

28 October 2026
18:00

Brann (Norway)	3–0	(Poland) Czarni Sosnowiec
Lovera 5', 17'; Zomers 11'	Report

Brann Stadion, Bergen
Attendance: 825
Referee: Maika Vanderstichel (France)
11 November 2026
17:00

Czarni Sosnowiec (Poland)	1–5	(Norway) Brann
Katowicz 90+1'	Report	Birkelund 11'; Sarapata 18' (o.g.); Authen 41'; Lovera 45+1'; Brunes 90'

Zagłębie Sports Park, Sosnowiec
Attendance: 747
Referee: Olivia Tschon (Austria)

Brann won 8–1 on aggregate.

29 October 2026
18:00

Sparta Prague (Czech Republic)	2–2	(Portugal) Torreense
Bergford 34'; Paulenová 90+3'	Report	Konst 57'; Hayes 70'

Stadion Letná, Prague
Attendance: 527
Referee: Sofiya Prychyna (Ukraine)
12 November 2026
19:00

Torreense (Portugal)	3–0	(Czech Republic) Sparta Prague
Weimer 11' (pen.); Pereira 66'; Konst 87'	Report

SC Uniao Torreense sporting complex, Torres Vedras
Attendance: 391
Referee: Abigail Byrne (England)

Torreense won 5–2 on aggregate.

28 October 2026
18:00

Spartak Myjava (Slovakia)	1–3	(Sweden) Hammarby IF
Vredíková 71'	Report	Sørum 5' (pen.); Nyhagen 78'; Rehnberg 86'

Stadium Myjava, Myjava
Attendance: 800
Referee: Eugenia Gil Soriano (Spain)
11 November 2026
19:00

Hammarby IF (Sweden)	4–0	(Slovakia) Spartak Myjava
Sørum 73', 80'; Hermannsdóttir 75'; Maiquez 84'	Report

Hammarby IP, Stockholm
Attendance: 1,180
Referee: Aleksandra Česen (Slovenia)

Hammarby IF won 7–1 on aggregate.

28 October 2026
19:30

Ajax (Netherlands)	1–2	(Sweden) Malmö FF
Visscher 62'	Report	D'Aquila 2'; Skoog 57'

Sportpark De Toekomst, Ouder-Amstel
Attendance: 899
Referee: Milica Milovanović (Serbia)
11 November 2026
19:00

Malmö FF (Sweden)	0–2	(Netherlands) Ajax
	Report	Van Egmond 86'; Spitse 90'

Stadion, Malmö
Attendance: 893
Referee: Nanna Løf Andersen (Denmark)

Ajax won 3–2 on aggregate.

29 October 2026
18:00

Rosenborg (Norway)	1–1	(Denmark) Brøndby
Revees 36'	Report	Bischoff 24'

Koteng Arena, Trondheim
Attendance: 477
Referee: Shona Shukrula (Netherlands)
11 November 2026
18:00

Brøndby (Denmark)	2–0	(Norway) Rosenborg
Engesvik 10'; Brenn 90'	Report

Brøndby Stadion, Brøndbyvester
Attendance: 627
Referee: Merima Čelik (Bosnia and Herzegovina)

Brøndby won 3–1 on aggregate.

28 October 2026
19:00

VfL Wolfsburg (Germany)	7–0	(Netherlands) Feyenoord
Prašnikar 2' (pen.), 49'; Zicai 28', 31', 36'; Fløe 65' (pen.); Paliama 67' (o.g.)	Report

AOK Stadion, Wolfsburg
Attendance: 1,207
Referee: Karoline Marie Jensen (Norway)
10 November 2026
19:00

Feyenoord (Netherlands)	0–3	(Germany) VfL Wolfsburg
	Report	Piljić 73'; Kerim-Lindland 83'; Bussy 87'

Sportcomplex Varkenoord, Rotterdam
Attendance: 493
Referee: Déborah Anex (Switzerland)

VfL Wolfsburg won 10–0 on aggregate.

== Quarter-finals ==
The draw for the quarter-finals was held on 2 October 2026.

=== Summary ===
The first legs will be played on 3 and 4 February, and the second legs on 10 and 11 February 2027.

Quarter-finals
Team 1	Agg.	Team 2	1st leg	2nd leg
Eintracht Frankfurt (Germany)	Match 1	(Spain) Real Sociedad	3–4 Feb	10–11 Feb
Brann (Norway)	Match 2	(Portugal) Torreense	3–4 Feb	10–11 Feb
Hammarby IF (Sweden)	Match 3	(Netherlands) Ajax	3–4 Feb	10–11 Feb
Brøndby (Denmark)	Match 4	(Germany) VfL Wolfsburg	3–4 Feb	10–11 Feb

=== Matches ===
February 2027

Eintracht Frankfurt (Germany)	v	(Spain) Real Sociedad

February 2027

Real Sociedad (Spain)	v	(Germany) Eintracht Frankfurt

February 2027

Brann (Norway)	v	(Portugal) Torreense

February 2027

Torreense (Portugal)	v	(Norway) Brann

February 2027

Hammarby IF (Sweden)	v	(Netherlands) Ajax

February 2027

Ajax (Netherlands)	v	(Sweden) Hammarby IF

February 2027

Brøndby (Denmark)	v	(Germany) VfL Wolfsburg

February 2027

VfL Wolfsburg (Germany)	v	(Denmark) Brøndby

== Semi-finals ==
The draw for the semi-finals was held on 2 October 2026.

=== Summary ===
The first legs will be played on 23 and 24 March, and the second legs on 31 March and 1 April 2027.

Semi-finals
Team 1	Agg.	Team 2	1st leg	2nd leg
Winner QF Match 1	Match 1	Winner QF Match 2	23–24 Mar	31 Mar – 1 Apr
Winner QF Match 3	Match 2	Winner QF Match 4	23–24 Mar	31 Mar – 1 Apr

=== Matches ===
March 2027

Winner QF Match 1	v	Winner QF Match 2

March 2027

Winner QF Match 2	v	Winner QF Match 1

March 2027

Winner QF Match 3	v	Winner QF Match 4

March 2027

Winner QF Match 4	v	Winner QF Match 3

== Final ==
The draw for the final was held on 2 October 2026.

=== Summary ===
The first leg will be played on 1 or 2 May, and the second leg on 8 or 9 May 2027.

Semi-finals
Team 1	Agg.	Team 2	1st leg	2nd leg
Winner SF Match 1	F	Winner SF Match 2	1–2 May	8–9 May

=== Matches ===
May 2027

Winner SF Match 1	v	Winner SF Match 2

May 2027

Winner SF Match 2	v	Winner SF Match 1
