= 2026–27 Eredivisie (women) =

Professional football season in the Netherlands

Vrouwen Eredivisie
- Season: 2026–27
- Dates: 16 August 2026-May 2027
- Country: Netherlands
- Teams: 10
- Matches: 55
- Goals: 183 (3.33 per match)

The 2026–27 Vrouwen Eredivisie, known as the 2026–27 Eurojackpot Vrouwen Eredivisie for sponsorship reasons, is the 17th season of the Vrouwen Eredivisie, the top division of women's football in the Netherlands. The season started on 16 August 2026 and ends in May 2027.

PSV Eindhoven entered the season as the defending champion after winning their first league title. In August 2026, PSV won the Super Cup for the first time. PSV and second-place finisher Ajax competed in the UEFA Women's Champions League, both losing in the third qualifying round in September. Feyenoord is competing in the UEFA Women's Europa Cup.

De Graafschap was promoted from the Vrouwen Eerste Divisie as three teams were relegated as the league contracted from 12 to 10 teams.

== Format ==
The 10 teams in the league play in a triple round-robin format: each team plays all other teams twice over the first 18 rounds of play, once at home and once away, with the location of the third match decided in February 2027.

== Teams ==
Location of teams in the Vrouwen Eredivisie in 2026–27

Ten teams are competing in the 2026–27 season. New to the league this season is De Graafschap, which was promoted from the Vrouwen Eerste Divisie.

Team	City / Town	Venue	Debut season
ADO Den Haag	Den Haag	ADO Den Haag Stadium	2007–08
AFC Ajax	Amsterdam	Sportpark De Toekomst, Johan Cruyff Stadium	2015–16
AZ Alkmaar	Alkmaar	AFAS Trainingcomplex, AFAS Stadion	2023–24*
De Graafschap	Doetinchem	Sportpark Dichteren, De Vijverberg	2026–27
Feyenoord	Rotterdam	Varkenoord, De Kuip	2021–22
SC Heerenveen	Heerenveen	Sportpark Skoatterwâld	2007–08
PSV	Eindhoven	De Herdgang, Philips Stadion	2015–16
FC Twente	Enschede	Sportpark Schreurserve, De Grolsch Veste, Sportpark Het Diekman	2007–08
FC Utrecht	Utrecht	Sportcomplex Zoudenbalch, Stadion Galgenwaard	2023–24*
PEC Zwolle	Zwolle	MAC³PARK Stadion, Sportpark De Vegtlust	2010–11

*=return after previously playing in the Eredivisie

== Standings ==
Pos	Team	Pld	W	D	L	GF	GA	GD	Pts	Qualification
1	Twente	11	8	1	2	31	7	+24	25	Qualification to Champions League second qualifying round
2	Ajax	11	8	1	2	29	11	+18	25	Qualification to Champions League second qualifying round
3	PSV	11	7	2	2	27	11	+16	23	Qualification to Europa Cup first qualifying round
4	De Graafschap	11	6	0	5	15	18	−3	18	
5	AZ	11	5	1	5	13	21	−8	16	
6	PEC Zwolle	11	3	4	4	17	19	−2	13	
7	Heerenveen	11	3	3	5	17	22	−5	12	
8	Feyenoord	11	4	0	7	13	24	−11	12	
9	ADO Den Haag	11	2	2	7	13	30	−17	8	
10	Utrecht	11	1	2	8	8	20	−12	5	Possible relegation to the Vrouwen Eerste Divisie

Updated to match(es) played on 22 November 2026. Source: Vrouwen Eredivisie (in Dutch)
Rules for classification: Season in progress: 1) Most points won; 2) Less points lost; 3) Goal difference; 4) Goals scored; 5) Head-to-head points; 6) Head-to-head goal difference; 7) Head-to-head away goals scored; 8) Alphabetical order; End of season: 1) Points; 2) Goal difference; 3) Goals scored; 4) Head-to-head points; 5) Head-to-head goal difference; 6) Head-to-head away goals scored; 7) Play-off match, including extra time and a penalty shoot-out, if necessary.

== Results ==
Home \ Away	ADO	AJA	AZ	GRA	FEY	HEE	PEC	PSV	TWE	UTR
ADO Den Haag	—			0–2	0–1	2–2		0–3	1–7	
Ajax	7–1	—	5–1	1–0			1–0	1–4	2–0	
AZ	2–1	1–1	—				0–2	3–1	0–5	1–0
De Graafschap	2–3	0–5	3–0	—	1–0	1–0				
Feyenoord		1–4	1–2		—	3–2	2–3	0–6	0–1	
Heerenveen	1–1	3–1	1–0		1–2	—				2–0
PEC Zwolle	2–4			2–3		2–2	—	0–2	1–1	1–1
PSV				4–0		5–2	0–0	—	0–4	1–1
Twente				2–1	4–0	5–1		0–1	—	2–0
Utrecht	1–0	0–1	1–3	1–2	0–3		3–4			—

Updated to match(es) played on 22 November 2026. Source: FBref.com
Legend: Blue = home team win; Yellow = draw; Red = away team win.

== Season statistics ==
=== Top scorers ===
As of 22 November 2026

Rank	Player	Club	Goals
1	(Netherlands) Jill Roord	Twente	8
2	(Netherlands) Jaimy Ravensbergen	Twente	8
3	(Netherlands) Eva Oude Elberink	Twente	8
4	(Netherlands) Liz Rijsbergen	PSV	8

== Broadcasting ==
All league matches are broadcast on ESPN in the Netherlands.
