= 2025 Toppserien =

42nd season of top women's football (soccer) league in Norway

Toppserien
- Season: 2025
- Dates: 21 March – 15 November
- Champions: Brann (2nd title)
- Relegated: Kolbotn
- Champions League: Brann; Vålerenga
- Europa Cup: Rosenborg
- Matches: 135
- Goals: 431 (3.19 per match)
- Top goalscorer: Olaug Tvedten (19 goals)
- Biggest home win: Brann 9–0 Lyn (3 October 2025)
- Biggest away win: Kolbotn 1–6 Vålerenga (24 May 2025)
- Highest scoring: Brann 9–0 Lyn (3 October 2025)
- Longest winning run: 15 matches Brann
- Longest unbeaten run: 15 matches Brann
- Longest winless run: 11 matches Kolbotn
- Longest losing run: 10 matches Kolbotn
- Highest attendance: 7,014; Brann - Vålerenga (16 August 2025)
- Lowest attendance: 48; Kolbotn - Rosenborg (15 November 2025)
- Average attendance: 732

The 2025 Toppserien was the 42nd season of the highest women's football league in Norway. The season started 21 March 2025 and ended 15 November 2025, not including play-off matches.

== Teams ==
Locations of the teams in the 2025 Toppserien

Hønefoss and Bodø/Glimt were promoted from the 2024 First Division. They replaced Arna-Bjørnar and Åsane, who were relegated from the 2024 Toppserien.

=== Stadiums and locations ===
Team	Ap.	Location	County	Arena	Turf	Capacity
Bodø/Glimt	1	Bodø	Nordland	Aspmyra	Artificial	8,300
Brann	35	Bergen	Vestland	Brann Stadion	Natural	17,500
Hønefoss	1	Ringerike	Buskerud	Aka Arena	Artificial	4,120
Kolbotn	30	Oslo (Note: While Kolbotn are normally based in Nordre Follo, they played their home games in Oslo for the 2025 season.)	Oslo	Grorud Match Kunstgress (Note: Kolbotn played two home games at Consto Arena and one each at KFUM Arena and Jessheim.)	Artificial	1,700
LSK Kvinner	42	Lillestrøm	Akershus	LSK-Hallen (Note: LSK Kvinner played three home games at Rolvsrud and one each at Åråsen and Jessheim.)	Artificial	1,800
Lyn	8	Oslo	Oslo	Kringsjå Kunstgress (Note: Lyn played one home game at KFUM Arena.)	Artificial	450
Rosenborg	42	Trondheim	Trøndelag	Koteng Arena (Note: Rosenborg played two home games at Lerkendal.)	Artificial	895
Røa	24	Oslo	Oslo	Røa Kunstgress	Artificial	450
Stabæk	16	Bærum	Akershus	Nadderud	Artificial	4,938
Vålerenga	14	Oslo	Oslo	Intility Arena	Artificial	16,556

=== Personnel and kits ===
Team	Manager	Captain	Kit manufacturer	Shirt sponsor
Bodø/Glimt	(Norway) Cato André Hansen	(Norway) Cecilie Falch	Puma	SpareBank 1 Nord-Norge
Brann	(Norway) Leif Gunnar Smerud	(Norway) Karoline Haugland	Nike	Sparebanken Norge
Hønefoss	(Norway) Martin Klemetsrud Lindmark	(Norway) Silje Bekkåsen Nyhagen	Select	Barnekreftforeningen
Kolbotn	(Norway) Martin Dolvik (caretaker)	(Norway) Camilla Huseby	Hummel	OBOS
LSK Kvinner	(Norway) André Bergdølmo	(Norway) Marte Hjelmhaug	Puma	OBOS
Lyn	(Norway) August Nyland	(Norway) Kirvil Odden Sundsfjord	Hummel	OBOS
Rosenborg	(Northern Ireland) Robin Shroot	(Norway) Mali Næss	Adidas	SpareBank 1 SMN
Røa	(Norway) Geir Kristian Nordby	(Norway) Sarah Suphellen	Diadora	OBOS
Stabæk	(Sweden) Jan Jönsson	(Norway) Emilie Bølviken	Nike	SpareBank 1 Østlandet
Vålerenga	(Norway) Nils Lexerød	(Sweden) Tove Enblom	Adidas	OBOS

=== Managerial changes ===
Team	Outgoing manager	Manner of departure	Date of vacancy	Position in the table	Incoming manager	Date of appointment
Kolbotn	(England) Luke Torjussen	Mutual consent	23 December 2024	Pre-season	(Norway) Arild Sundgot	1 January 2025
Brann	(England) Martin Ho	Signed by Tottenham	4 July 2025	2nd	(Norway) Leif Gunnar Smerud	1 August 2025
Lyn	(Norway) Joakim Dragsten	Mutual consent	7 October 2025	6th	(Norway) August Nyland	7 October 2025
Kolbotn	(Norway) Arild Sundgot	Mutual consent	28 October 2025	10th	(Norway) Martin Dolvik (caretaker)	28 October 2025

== League table ==
The league consists of 10 teams who play each other three times, totalling 27 matches per team.

Pos	Team	Pld	W	D	L	GF	GA	GD	Pts	Qualification or relegation
1	Brann (C)	27	24	2	1	90	11	+79	74	Qualification for Champions League second qualifying round
2	Vålerenga	27	22	1	4	73	19	+54	67	Qualification for Champions League second qualifying round
3	Rosenborg	27	18	4	5	63	26	+37	58	Qualification for Europa Cup first qualifying round
4	LSK Kvinner	27	12	4	11	48	47	+1	40	
5	Stabæk	27	12	4	11	31	37	−6	40	
6	Hønefoss	27	7	5	15	23	56	−33	26	
7	Lyn	27	6	7	14	31	52	−21	25	
8	Bodø/Glimt	27	6	2	19	22	63	−41	20	
9	Røa (O)	27	4	7	16	23	52	−29	19	Qualification for relegation play-offs
10	Kolbotn (R)	27	5	2	20	27	68	−41	17	Relegation to First Division

Source: Norwegian Football Federation (in Norwegian)
Rules for classification: 1) Points; 2) Most matches played; 3) Goal difference; 4) Number of goals scored; 5) Head-to-head points; 6) Head-to-head goal difference; 7) Head-to-head away goals scored; 8) Playoff
(C) Champions; (O) Play-off winners; (R) Relegated

== Results ==
=== Rounds 1–18 ===
Home \ Away	BOD	BRA	HØN	KOL	LSK	LYN	ROS	RØA	STA	VÅL
Bodø/Glimt	—	0–3	1–2	3–1	0–4	2–1	0–4	1–0	0–4	0–3
Brann	4–0	—	2–0	7–0	1–1	0–1	3–0	5–0	3–0	2–1
Hønefoss	0–1	0–3	—	2–0	2–1	1–0	2–3	2–1	0–1	0–4
Kolbotn	1–2	0–2	3–1	—	0–2	1–0	2–5	2–0	0–1	1–6
LSK Kvinner	4–0	0–3	5–1	1–1	—	2–0	1–2	1–2	1–1	0–2
Lyn	0–0	0–0	1–1	2–1	2–3	—	1–1	1–0	6–0	1–1
Rosenborg	2–1	0–2	0–0	1–0	5–0	3–0	—	4–1	3–0	2–0
Røa	1–1	2–5	0–0	2–1	1–1	2–1	1–1	—	0–0	0–1
Stabæk	2–0	0–1	1–0	1–0	2–3	4–1	0–3	2–1	—	0–2
Vålerenga	4–0	0–3	7–0	6–0	3–1	3–2	2–0	3–0	2–0	—

Source: Norwegian Football Federation
Legend: Blue = home team win; Yellow = draw; Red = away team win.

=== Round 19–27 ===
Home \ Away	BOD	BRA	HØN	KOL	LSK	LYN	ROS	RØA	STA	VÅL
Bodø/Glimt	—	—	—	1–2	—	1–2	0–1	—	—	1–4
Brann	8–0	—	2–0	—	—	9–0	2–1	3–0	—	—
Hønefoss	3–2	—	—	—	1–3	2–2	—	—	0–2	0–1
Kolbotn	—	1–5	1–2	—	—	—	2–4	1–2	1–0	—
LSK Kvinner	1–0	1–5	—	4–3	—	4–0	—	—	—	—
Lyn	—	—	—	2–2	—	—	0–2	4–2	0–3	—
Rosenborg	—	—	8–0	—	4–1	—	—	2–1	1–1	1–3
Røa	0–4	—	1–1	—	2–3	—	—	—	1–1	—
Stabæk	2–1	1–3	—	—	2–0	—	—	—	—	0–4
Vålerenga	—	2–4	—	4–0	2–0	2–1	—	1–0	—	—

Source: Norwegian Football Federation
Legend: Blue = home team win; Yellow = draw; Red = away team win.

== Positions by round ==
Team ╲ Round	1	2	3	4	5	6	7	8	9	10	11	12	13	14	15	16	17	18	19	20	21	22	23	24	25	26	27
Brann	2	2	2	1	1	1	1	1	1	1	1	2	2	2	1	1	1	1	1	1	1	1	1	1	1	1	1
Vålerenga	1	1	1	3	2	3	3	3	3	2	2	1	1	1	2	2	2	2	2	2	2	2	2	2	2	2	2
Rosenborg	9	6	5	4	3	2	2	2	2	3	3	3	3	3	3	3	3	3	3	3	3	3	3	3	3	3	3
LSK Kvinner	3	3	3	2	4	4	5	5	5	5	4	4	4	4	4	4	4	5	4	5	5	5	5	5	5	4	4
Stabæk	4	5	4	5	5	5	4	4	4	4	5	5	5	5	5	5	5	4	5	4	4	4	4	4	4	5	5
Hønefoss	6	7	8	10	7	6	6	7	6	6	7	9	9	9	6	6	6	6	7	7	8	6	7	7	7	6	6
Lyn	8	8	9	6	6	8	8	10	9	10	8	7	7	7	7	8	7	7	6	6	6	7	6	6	6	7	7
Bodø/Glimt	4	4	7	9	9	10	10	8	8	7	6	6	6	6	8	7	8	8	8	9	7	8	8	8	8	8	8
Røa	6	9	6	7	8	9	9	6	7	8	9	8	8	8	9	9	9	9	9	8	9	9	9	9	9	9	9
Kolbotn	10	10	10	8	10	7	7	9	10	9	10	10	10	10	10	10	10	10	10	10	10	10	10	10	10	10	10

Qualification for Champions League second qualifying round
Qualification for Europa Cup first qualifying round
Qualification for the relegation play-offs
Relegation to the First Division

== Results by round ==
Team ╲ Round	1	2	3	4	5	6	7	8	9	10	11	12	13	14	15	16	17	18	19	20	21	22	23	24	25	26	27
Bodø/Glimt	W	L	L	L	L	L	D	W	L	W	W	L	L	L	L	W	L	D	L	L	W	L	L	L	L	L	L
Brann	W	W	W	W	W	W	D	W	D	W	W	L	W	W	W	W	W	W	W	W	W	W	W	W	W	W	W
Hønefoss	L	D	L	L	W	W	L	L	W	D	L	L	L	L	W	W	D	L	L	L	L	W	L	D	W	D	L
Kolbotn	L	L	L	W	L	W	L	L	W	D	L	L	L	L	L	L	L	L	L	L	L	L	D	L	W	W	L
LSK Kvinner	W	W	L	W	L	D	D	L	L	D	W	W	W	W	L	L	D	L	W	L	L	L	W	W	L	W	W
Lyn	L	D	L	W	L	L	D	L	D	L	W	W	L	L	D	L	W	D	W	L	L	L	D	D	W	L	L
Rosenborg	L	W	W	W	W	D	W	W	W	L	L	W	W	W	W	W	D	D	D	W	W	W	W	W	L	L	W
Røa	L	L	W	L	L	D	L	W	L	D	L	W	L	L	D	L	D	D	L	W	L	L	D	L	L	D	L
Stabæk	W	L	W	L	W	D	W	L	L	L	L	L	W	W	D	L	W	W	D	W	W	W	D	L	L	L	W
Vålerenga	W	W	W	L	W	L	W	W	W	W	W	W	W	W	D	W	L	W	W	W	W	W	L	W	W	W	W

Source: Football Association of Norway (in Norwegian)
W = Win; D = Draw; L = Loss

== Relegation play-offs ==
The ninth placed team will face the fourth placed team of the First Division in a two-legged play-off to decide who will play in the Toppserien next season.

19 November 2025
18:00 CET

Åsane	0–1	Røa
	Report	58' Sofia Susnic Krossøy

Åsane Arena, Bergen
Attendance: Karoline Marie Jensen
Referee: 429
22 November 2025
13:00 CET

Røa	1–1	Åsane
Elle Ulstein 5'	Report	82' Marina Heggernes Jensen

Røa Kunstgress, Oslo
Attendance: Marit Buhaug Folstad
Referee: 252
- Røa won 2–1 on aggregate.

== Season statistics ==
=== Top goalscorers ===
Rank	Player	Club	Goals
1	(Norway) Olaug Tvedten	Vålerenga	19
2	(Norway) Karina Sævik	Vålerenga	17
3	(Norway) Signe Gaupset	Brann	15
3	(Scotland) Lauren Davidson	Brann	15
5	(United States) Brenna Lovera	Brann	13
6	(Norway) Celine Nergård	Rosenborg	11
6	(Norway) Amalie Eikeland	Brann	11
6	(Norway) Jenny Røsholm Olsen	Lyn	11
9	(Norway) Monica Isaksen	Brann	10
10	(Norway) Camilla Linberg	Kolbotn	9

=== Clean sheets ===
Rank	Player	Club	Clean sheets
1	(Norway) Selma Panengstuen	Brann	18
2	(Sweden) Tove Enblom	Vålerenga	11
3	(Norway) Sunniva Skoglund	Stabæk	10
4	(Norway) Rugile Rulyte	Rosenborg	9
5	(Norway) Klara Sporsem	LSK Kvinner	5
5	(Norway) Thiril Erichsen	Vålerenga	5
7	(Norway) Siri Ervik	Hønefoss	4
7	(United States) Aubrei Corder	Bodø/Glimt	4
9	(Norway) Una Langkås	Lyn	3
9	(Republic of Ireland) Savanna Duffy	Kolbotn	3

=== Hat-tricks ===
Player	For	Against	Result	Date
(Norway) Anna Aahjem	Brann	Bodø/Glimt	4–0 (H)	12 April 2025
(Norway) Amalie Eikeland	Brann	Røa	5–2 (A)	16 April 2025
(Norway) Olaug Tvedten	Vålerenga	Bodø/Glimt	4–0 (H)	10 May 2025
(Norway) Celine Nergård	Rosenborg	Bodø/Glimt	4–0 (A)	6 June 2025
(Norway) Karina Sævik	Vålerenga	Hønefoss	7–0 (H)	19 June 2025
(Denmark) Lise Dissing	Bodø/Glimt	Røa	4–0 (A)	20 September 2025
(Norway) Elise Thorsnes	Vålerenga	Bodø/Glimt	4–1 (A)	3 October 2025
(Scotland) Lauren Davidson	Brann	Lyn	9–0 (H)	3 October 2025
(Norway) Celine Nergård	Rosenborg	Hønefoss	8–0 (H)	12 October 2025

=== Discipline ===
==== Player ====
- Most yellow cards: 5
  - (Japan) Kanna Matsuhisa (Kolbotn)
  - (Norway) Sarah Suphellen (Røa)
- Most red cards: 1
  - (Norway) Sigrid Bloch-Hansen (Røa)
  - (Norway) Kristin Gumaer (Hønefoss)
  - (Norway) Nora Harnes Håheim (Lyn)
  - (Sweden) Agnes Nyberg (Rosenborg)
  - (Norway) Amie Sannes (Bodø/Glimt)

==== Club ====
- Most yellow cards: 34
  - Røa
- Fewest yellow cards: 9
  - Vålerenga
- Most red cards: 1
  - Bodø/Glimt
  - Hønefoss
  - Lyn
  - Rosenborg
  - Røa
- Fewest red cards: 0
  - Brann
  - Kolbotn
  - LSK Kvinner
  - Stabæk
  - Vålerenga

== League attendances ==
Pos	Team	Total	High	Low	Average	Change
1	Brann	43,396	7,014	1,281	3,100	+36.4%
2	Rosenborg	10,599	3,521	313	757	+11.3%
3	Hønefoss	9,834	1,098	555	702	+14.0%^{1}
4	Vålerenga	8,790	1,390	213	628	−0.3%
5	Bodø/Glimt	6,433	1,417	157	495	+15.1%^{1}
6	LSK Kvinner	6,415	1,928	182	493	+27.7%
7	Stabæk	5,558	1,612	132	428	+3.6%
8	Røa	3,663	468	148	282	+6.8%
9	Lyn	2,612	359	109	201	−17.3%
10	Kolbotn	1,486	489	48	106	−53.1%
	League total	98,786	7,014	48	732	+28.6%

Notes:
1: Team played last season in 1. divisjon.
