= Waver =

Waver may refer to:

- Waver, Belgium, Dutch name of the Belgian city of Wavre
- Waver, England, a location in Cumbria, England
  - River Waver in Cumbria
- Waver, Netherlands, a village in the Dutch municipality of Ouder-Amstel

== See also ==
- Waiver
