= Claudia Cagnina =

Peruvian footballer (born 1997)

Personal information
- Full name: Claudia Nicole Cagnina Berenguel
- Date of birth: 10 September 1997 (age 29)
- Place of birth: Valley Stream, New York, U.S.
- Height: 1.70 m (5 ft 7 in)
- Position: Midfielder

Team information
- Current team: FK Bodø/Glimt
- Number: 13

College career
| Years | Team | Apps | (Gls) |
| 2015–2018 | St. John's Red Storm | 67 | (2) |

Senior career*
| Years | Team | Apps | (Gls) |
| 2018–2019 | SUSA FC | 4 | (0) |
| 2019–2020 | Lugano | 0 | (0) |
| 2020 | Tavagnacco | 1 | (0) |
| 2020 | Keflavík | 2 | (0) |
| 2021–202? | Zaragoza CFF | 1 | (0) |
| 202? | Sandvikens IF | | |
| 202?– | FK Bodø/Glimt | | |

International career^{‡}
| 2018– | Peru | 4 | (0) |
- * Club domestic league appearances and goals as of 27 August 2020 ‡ National team caps and goals as of 12 April 2018

Claudia Nicole Cagnina Berenguel (born 10 September 1997) is a footballer who plays as a midfielder for Toppserien club FK Bodø/Glimt. Born in the United States, she represents Peru at international level. She also holds Italian citizenship.

Cagnina's mother was born and raised in Peru, while her paternal grandparents were born in Rome, Italy and moved to New York.
