= FK Bodø/Glimt (women) =

Bodø/Glimt
- Full name: Fotballklubben Bodø/Glimt
- Founded: 1 January 2024; 2 years ago
- Ground: Aspmyra Stadion, Bodø
- Capacity: 8,270
- President: Inge Henning Andersen
- Manager: Øyvind Tjelde Haga
- League: Toppserien
- 2025: Toppserien, 8th of 16
- Website: glimt.no
Home colours	Away colours	Third colours

FK Bodø/Glimt is a Norwegian professional football club from the city of Bodø in Bodø Municipality, Nordland county, Norway. It is part of the FK Bodø/Glimt club.

== History ==
In October 2017, FK Bodø/Glimt began exploring the creation of a girls' and women's football program. After several years of discussions with IK Grand Bodø, the clubs agreed that Bodø/Glimt would lead the city’s top-level women’s football initiative.

The clubs later signed a cooperation agreement under which Bodø/Glimt would take over IK Grand Bodø's league license and position in the Norwegian women's league system from 1 January 2024. The 2023 season was used as a transition period ahead of the takeover.

FK Bodø/Glimt played their first season in the 2024 Norwegian First Division. They finished second in the promotion group and subsequently defeated Åsane in a promotion play-off, winning on penalties after a 1–1 aggregate draw to secure promotion to the Toppserien.

== Squad ==
As of 20 May 2026

Note: Flags indicate national team as defined under FIFA eligibility rules; some limited exceptions apply. Players may hold more than one non-FIFA nationality.

No.	Pos.	Nation	Player
2	DF	NOR	Amie Sannes
4	DF	USA	Rachel Kutella
6	MF	NOR	Kristina Brudvik
7	MF	JPN	Yuuka Kurosaki
8	MF	NOR	Mathea Theting
9	FW	DEN	Lise Dissing
10	FW	NOR	Gerd Anine Johansen
11	MF	NOR	Ida Holm Neset
12	GK	USA	Michaela Moran
13	MF	PER	Claudia Cagnina
14	DF	NOR	Jenny Storsletten

No.	Pos.	Nation	Player
15	DF	NOR	Carolina Wold
16	MF	SWE	Sofia Hagman
17	DF	NOR	Cecilie Falch (captain)
18	FW	NOR	Anna Isabella Johansen
21	FW	USA	Sarah Foley
23	FW	NOR	Emma Christensen
25	GK	NOR	Emma Behrns
26	MF	NOR	Katja Rengard
27	MF	NOR	Signe Tømmerås
29	FW	NOR	Marie Handberg
35	MF	NOR	Hedda Haukland
