= De Graafschap (women) =

Women's football club in Doetinchem (founded in 2024)

- Full name: Betaald Voetbal De Graafschap Vrouwen
- Nickname: Superboerinnen
- Founded: 1 July 2024
- Ground: Sportpark Dichteren
- Manager: Timo Kleinhesselink
- League: Vrouwen Eredivisie

De Graafschap Vrouwen is a Dutch women's football team from Doetinchem, Gelderland, affiliated with De Graafschap, that competes in the Vrouwen Eredivisie. The women's club was founded on 1 July 2024 and initially competed in the Vrouwen Eerste Divisie before being promoted to the Eredivisie ahead of the 2026–2027 season. The club plays most of its home matches at Sportpark Dichteren, with some matches held at the larger De Vijverberg. The club is nicknamed the Superboerinnen (transl. Super Farmers), which is similar to the mens' club nickname, the Superboeren.

De Graafschap began planning a women's team in 2020, with the club debuting its top team in the Eerste Divisie in 2024. By 2026, the club had eight women's teams, including several youth teams. The club earned promotion to the Eredivisie at the end of its second season by defeating the reserve team of AFC Ajax in a playoff. The club won its second Eredivisie match, defeating SC Heerenveen 1–0 on 23 August 2026.

Midfielder Sam Roddenhof led the team in scoring during its first two years, leading the Eerste Divisie with 27 goals in 2025–2026. The club is managed by Timo Kleinhesselink.
