= 2026–27 UEFA Women's Europa Cup =

Association football tournament

Tournament details
- Dates: Qualifying rounds: 26 August – 1 October 2026; Competition proper: 28 October 2026 – 8 or 9 May 2027
- Teams: Competition proper: 16; Total: 44 (from 11 associations)

Tournament statistics
- Matches played: 16
- Goals scored: 52 (3.25 per match)
- Attendance: 20,636 (1,290 per match)
- Top scorer(s): Brenna Lovera (Brann); Elin Sørum (Hammarby IF); Cora Zicai (VfL Wolfsburg) (3 goals each)
- All statistics correct as of 12 November 2026.

The 2026–27 UEFA Women's Europa Cup is the second season of the UEFA Women's Europa Cup, Europe's secondary women's club football tournament organised by UEFA. The competition features a straight knockout format, with every round (including the final) played as a two-legged home-and-away tie.

The winners will automatically qualify for the third qualifying round (Champions Path) of the 2027–28 UEFA Women's Champions League.

As the title holders, BK Häcken qualified for the Champions League league phase and are unable to defend their title.

== Association team allocation ==
The association ranking based on the UEFA women's country coefficients is used to determine the number of participating teams for each association:

- Associations 8–13 and 18–24 each have one team qualify directly.
- 31 teams eliminated from the 2026–27 Women's Champions League qualifying rounds will be transferred to the Europa Cup.

An association must have an eleven-a-side women's domestic league to enter a team. As of 2026–27, 52 of the 55 UEFA member associations organize a women's domestic league, with the exceptions being Andorra (1 club in Spain), Liechtenstein (3 clubs in Switzerland) and San Marino (1 club in Italy).

=== Association ranking ===
For the 2026–27 UEFA Women's Europa Cup, the associations are allocated places according to their 2025 UEFA women's Association coefficients, which takes into account their performance in European competitions from 2020–21 to 2024–25.

Apart from the allocation based on the association coefficients, associations may have additional teams participating in the Europa Cup, as noted below:

- (UCL) – Additional teams transferred from the UEFA Women's Champions League

Association ranking for 2026–27 UEFA Women's Europa Cup

Rank	Association	Coeff.	Teams	Notes
1	England	68.499	0	
2	France	68.333	0	
3	Spain	66.999	0	+1 (UCL)
4	Germany	61.332	0	+2 (UCL)
5	Italy	38.000	0	
6	Portugal	33.000	0	+2 (UCL)
7	Sweden	24.665	0	+2 (UCL)
8	Norway	23.000	1	+2 (UCL)
9	Netherlands	21.000	1	+2 (UCL)
10	Austria	20.750	1	+1 (UCL)
11	Czech Republic	19.332	1	+1 (UCL)
12	Ukraine	19.000	1	+2 (UCL)
13	Denmark	14.750	1	+1 (UCL)
14	Switzerland	14.250	0	
15	Albania	13.000	0	
16	Scotland	12.000	0	+2 (UCL)
17	Cyprus	12.000	0	+1 (UCL)
18	Iceland	11.750	1	+1 (UCL)
19	Serbia	11.500	1	

Rank	Association	Coeff.	Teams	Notes
20	Belarus	11.250	1	
21	Belgium	11.000	1	
22	Slovenia	11.000	1	
23	Croatia	10.500	1	+1 (UCL)
24	Romania	10.000	1	+1 (UCL)
25	Bosnia and Herzegovina	10.000	0	+1 (UCL)
26	Kazakhstan	9.750	0	+1 (UCL)
27	Turkey	9.500	0	+1 (UCL)
28	Finland	9.500	0	+1 (UCL)
29	Greece	9.000	0	+1 (UCL)
30	Lithuania	9.000	0	+1 (UCL)
31	Hungary	9.000	0	
32	Russia	9.000	0	
33	Poland	9.000	0	+1 (UCL)
34	Georgia	8.500	0	
35	Republic of Ireland	8.000	0	
36	Malta	7.500	0	
37	Luxembourg	7.500	0	

Rank	Association	Coeff.	Teams	Notes
38	Israel	7.000	0	
39	Bulgaria	7.000	0	
40	Kosovo	6.500	0	+1 (UCL)
41	Latvia	6.500	0	
42	Montenegro	6.500	0	
43	Slovakia	6.500	0	+1 (UCL)
44	Estonia	6.000	0	
45	Northern Ireland	6.000	0	
46	North Macedonia	5.500	0	
47	Moldova	5.500	0	
48	Wales	5.000	0	
49	Faroe Islands	5.000	0	
50	Armenia	4.000	0	
51	Azerbaijan	1.000	0	
NR	Gibraltar	—	0	DNE
NR	Andorra	—	0	NL
NR	Liechtenstein	—	0	NL
NR	San Marino	—	0	NL

=== Distribution ===
	Teams entering in this round	Teams advancing from the previous round	Teams entering from the Champions League qualifying rounds
First qualifying round (24 teams)	7 runners-up from associations 18–24; 6 third-placed teams from associations 8–13		7 third-placed teams from the second qualifying round (Champions Path) mini-tournaments; 4 third-placed teams from the second qualifying round (League Path) mini-tournaments
Second qualifying round (32 teams)		12 winners from the first qualifying round	7 runners-up from the second qualifying round (Champions Path) mini-tournaments; 4 runners-up from the second qualifying round (League Path) mini-tournaments; 4 losers from the third qualifying round (Champions Path); 5 losers from the third qualifying round (League Path)
Round of 16 (16 teams)		16 winners from the second qualifying round	

=== Teams ===
The labels in the parentheses show how each team qualified for the place of its starting round:

- 2nd, 3rd, 4th: League position of the previous season
- CL: Transferred from the Women's Champions League
  - CH/LP Q3: Transferred from the third qualifying round (Champions/League Path)
  - CH/LP Q2: Transferred from the second qualifying round mini-tournaments (Champions/League Path)
    - RU: Runner-up of the mini-tournament
    - TP: Third place of the mini-tournament

Qualified teams for 2026–27 UEFA Women's Europa Cup
Entry round	Teams			
Second qualifying round	(Norway) Brann (CL CH Q3)	(Netherlands) PSV Eindhoven (CL CH Q3)	(Czech Republic) Sparta Prague (CL CH Q3)	(Poland) Czarni Sosnowiec (CL CH Q3)
Second qualifying round	(Spain) Real Sociedad (CL LP Q3)	(Germany) VfL Wolfsburg (CL LP Q3)	(Germany) Eintracht Frankfurt (CL LP Q3)	(Netherlands) Ajax (CL LP Q3)
Second qualifying round	(Austria) St. Pölten (CL LP Q3)	(Scotland) Heart of Midlothian (CL CH Q2 RU)	(Romania) Farul Constanța (CL CH Q2 RU)	(Kazakhstan) Aktobe (CL CH Q2 RU)
Second qualifying round	(Turkey) Fenerbahçe (CL CH Q2 RU)	(Finland) HJK (CL CH Q2 RU)	(Greece) PAOK (CL CH Q2 RU)	(Slovakia) Spartak Myjava (CL CH Q2 RU)
Second qualifying round	(Portugal) Sporting CP (CL LP Q2 RU)	(Sweden) Hammarby IF (CL LP Q2 RU)	(Sweden) Malmö FF (CL LP Q2 RU)	(Scotland) Rangers (CL LP Q2 RU)
First qualifying round	(Norway) Rosenborg (3rd)	(Netherlands) Feyenoord (3rd)	(Austria) Sturm Graz (3rd)	(Czech Republic) Slovan Liberec (3rd)
First qualifying round	(Ukraine) Kolos Kovalivka (4th)	(Denmark) Fortuna Hjørring (3rd)	(Iceland) FH (2nd)	(Serbia) Spartak Subotica (3rd)
First qualifying round	(Belarus) FC Minsk (2nd)	(Belgium) Anderlecht (2nd)	(Slovenia) Radomlje (2nd)	(Croatia) Agram (2nd)
First qualifying round	(Romania) Csíkszereda (2nd)	(Ukraine) Metalist 1925 Kharkiv (CL CH Q2 TP)	(Cyprus) Apollon Ladies (CL CH Q2 TP)	(Iceland) Breiðablik (CL CH Q2 TP)
First qualifying round	(Croatia) Hajduk Split (CL CH Q2 TP)	(Bosnia and Herzegovina) SFK 2000 (CL CH Q2 TP)	(Lithuania) Gintra (CL CH Q2 TP)	(Kosovo) Mitrovica (CL CH Q2 TP)
First qualifying round	(Portugal) Torreense (CL LP Q2 TP)	(Norway) Vålerenga (CL LP Q2 TP)	(Ukraine) SeaSters Odesa (CL LP Q2 TP)	(Denmark) Brøndby (CL LP Q2 TP)

Notes

1. Russia (RUS): On 28 February 2022, Russian football clubs and national teams were suspended from FIFA and UEFA competitions. The tables reflect Russia's ongoing suspension from UEFA competitions.
2. Serbia (SRB): Red Star Belgrade finished first and champions of the 2025–26 Serbian Women's Super League and qualified for the second qualifying round (Champions Path) of the 2026–27 UEFA Women's Champions League but failed to obtain a UEFA licence. As a result, their place in the competition was passed on to the second-placed team, TSC Bačka Topola, and the place that was entitled to TSC Bačka Topola in the first qualifying round of the 2026–27 UEFA Women's Europa Cup was passed on to the third-placed team, Spartak Subotica.
3. Ukraine (UKR): Vorskla Poltava finished third in the 2025–26 Ukrainian Women's Higher League and qualified for the first qualifying round but failed to obtain a UEFA licence and because of their financial difficulties. As a result, their place in the competition was passed on to the fourth-placed team, Kolos Kovalivka.

== Schedule ==
The schedule of the competition is as follows.

Schedule for 2026–27 UEFA Women's Europa Cup
Round	Draw date	First leg	Second leg
First qualifying round	11 August 2026	26 and 29 August 2026	1–2 September 2026
Second qualifying round	4 September 2026	23 September 2026	30 September 2026
Round of 16	2 October 2026	28–29 October 2026	10–11 November 2026
Quarter-finals	2 October 2026	3–4 February 2027	10–11 February 2027
Semi-finals	2 October 2026	23–24 March 2027	31 March–1 April 2027
Final	2 October 2026	1 or 2 May 2027	8 or 9 May 2027

== Qualifying rounds ==
=== First qualifying round ===
The first legs were played on 26 and 29 August, and the second legs on 1 and 2 September 2026. The winners of the ties advanced to the second qualifying round.

First qualifying round
Team 1	Agg.	Team 2	1st leg	2nd leg
FC Minsk (Belarus)	1–0	(Croatia) Agram	0–0	1–0
Hajduk Split (Croatia)	1–3	(Denmark) Fortuna Hjørring	0–2	1–1
Radomlje (Slovenia)	1–9	(Norway) Vålerenga	0–2	1–7
Apollon Ladies (Cyprus)	1–2	(Iceland) FH	0–2	1–0
Mitrovica (Kosovo)	0–5	(Ukraine) Metalist 1925 Kharkiv	0–0	0–5
Sturm Graz (Austria)	7–4	(Lithuania) Gintra	2–1	5–3
Torreense (Portugal)	9–2	(Ukraine) Kolos Kovalivka	6–1	3–1
SFK 2000 (Bosnia and Herzegovina)	3–4	(Czech Republic) Slovan Liberec	2–3	1–1
Breiðablik (Iceland)	9–1	(Romania) Csíkszereda	8–1	1–0
SeaSters Odesa (Ukraine)	1–3	(Norway) Rosenborg	1–0	0–3
Anderlecht (Belgium)	3–4	(Netherlands) Feyenoord	2–1	1–3
Spartak Subotica (Serbia)	1–9	(Denmark) Brøndby	0–5	1–4

=== Second qualifying round ===
The first legs were played on 23 September, and the second legs on 30 September 2026. The winners of the ties advanced to the round of 16.

Second qualifying round
Team 1	Agg.	Team 2	1st leg	2nd leg
FC Minsk (Belarus)	1–5	(Turkey) Fenerbahçe	1–4	0–1
Metalist 1925 Kharkiv (Ukraine)	2–6	(Portugal) Torreense	1–2	1–4
Ajax (Netherlands)	8–1	(Kazakhstan) Aktobe	8–0	0–1
VfL Wolfsburg (Germany)	8–1	(Austria) Sturm Graz	6–1	2–0
Sparta Prague (Czech Republic)	8–1	(Romania) Farul Constanța	4–1	4–0
Brøndby (Denmark)	6–3	(Portugal) Sporting CP	4–1	2–2
St. Pölten (Austria)	0–5	(Sweden) Malmö FF	0–2	0–3
Breiðablik (Iceland)	2–7	(Poland) Czarni Sosnowiec	2–6	0–1
Feyenoord (Netherlands)	5–3	(Norway) Vålerenga	4–1	1–2
Slovan Liberec (Czech Republic)	4–5	(Norway) Rosenborg	3–1	1–4
HJK (Finland)	0–6	(Norway) Brann	0–2	0–4
Heart of Midlothian (Scotland)	0–4	(Spain) Real Sociedad	0–0	0–4
FH (Iceland)	1–5 (Note: The order of the legs was reversed after the original draw.)	(Germany) Eintracht Frankfurt	0–1	1–4
PAOK (Greece)	3–4	(Slovakia) Spartak Myjava	2–3	1–1
Hammarby IF (Sweden)	5–0	(Scotland) Rangers	2–0	3–0
PSV Eindhoven (Netherlands)	1–0	(Denmark) Fortuna Hjørring	1–0	0–0

== Knockout phase ==
Location of teams of the 2026–27 UEFA Women's Europa Cup knockout phase

In the knockout phase, teams play against each other over two legs on a home-and-away basis. The bracket was predetermined by a draw held on 2 October 2026 to place the 16 teams into positions in the bracket. Eight teams were seeded according to club coefficients and drawn to face the unseeded teams in the round of 16. Which club played the first leg at home for each tie of every round was also decided.

=== Bracket ===
Round of 16
(Netherlands) PSV Eindhoven	0	1	1
(Germany) Eintracht Frankfurt	2	2	4
(Spain) Real Sociedad	2	2	4
(Turkey) Fenerbahçe	0	0	0
(Norway) Brann	3	5	8
(Poland) Czarni Sosnowiec	0	1	1
(Czech Republic) Sparta Prague	2	0	2
(Portugal) Torreense	2	3	5
(Slovakia) Spartak Myjava	1	0	1
(Sweden) Hammarby IF	3	4	7
(Netherlands) Ajax	1	2	3
(Sweden) Malmö FF	2	0	2
(Norway) Rosenborg	1	0	1
(Denmark) Brøndby	1	2	3
(Germany) VfL Wolfsburg	7	3	10
(Netherlands) Feyenoord	0	0	0

Quarter-finals
(Germany) Eintracht Frankfurt
(Spain) Real Sociedad
(Norway) Brann
(Portugal) Torreense
(Sweden) Hammarby IF
(Netherlands) Ajax
(Denmark) Brøndby
(Germany) VfL Wolfsburg

Semi-finals

Final

=== Round of 16 ===
The first legs were played on 28 and 29 October, and the second legs between 10 and 12 November 2026.

Round of 16
Team 1	Agg.	Team 2	1st leg	2nd leg
PSV Eindhoven (Netherlands)	1–4	(Germany) Eintracht Frankfurt	0–2	1–2
Real Sociedad (Spain)	4–0	(Turkey) Fenerbahçe	2–0	2–0
Brann (Norway)	8–1	(Poland) Czarni Sosnowiec	3–0	5–1
Sparta Prague (Czech Republic)	2–5	(Portugal) Torreense	2–2	0–3
Spartak Myjava (Slovakia)	1–7	(Sweden) Hammarby IF	1–3	0–4
Ajax (Netherlands)	3–2	(Sweden) Malmö FF	1–2	2–0
Rosenborg (Norway)	1–3	(Denmark) Brøndby	1–1	0–2
VfL Wolfsburg (Germany)	10–0	(Netherlands) Feyenoord	7–0	3–0

=== Quarter-finals ===
The first legs will be played on 3 and 4 February, and the second legs on 10 and 11 February 2027.

Quarter-finals
Team 1	Agg.	Team 2	1st leg	2nd leg
Eintracht Frankfurt (Germany)	Match 1	(Spain) Real Sociedad	3–4 Feb	10–11 Feb
Brann (Norway)	Match 2	(Portugal) Torreense	3–4 Feb	10–11 Feb
Hammarby IF (Sweden)	Match 3	(Netherlands) Ajax	3–4 Feb	10–11 Feb
Brøndby (Denmark)	Match 4	(Germany) VfL Wolfsburg	3–4 Feb	10–11 Feb

=== Semi-finals ===
The first legs will be played on 23 and 24 March, and the second legs on 31 March and 1 April 2027.

Semi-finals
Team 1	Agg.	Team 2	1st leg	2nd leg
Winner QF Match 1	Match 1	Winner QF Match 2	23–24 Mar	31 Mar – 1 Apr
Winner QF Match 3	Match 2	Winner QF Match 4	23–24 Mar	31 Mar – 1 Apr

=== Final ===
The first leg will be played on 1 or 2 May, and the second leg on 8 or 9 May 2027.

Semi-finals
Team 1	Agg.	Team 2	1st leg	2nd leg
Winner SF Match 1	F	Winner SF Match 2	1–2 May	8–9 May

== Statistics ==
As of 12 November 2026.

Statistics exclude qualifying rounds and play-off round.

=== Top goalscorers ===
Rank	Player	Team	Goals
1	(United States) Brenna Lovera	(Norway) Brann	3
1	(Norway) Elin Sørum	(Sweden) Hammarby IF	3
1	(Germany) Cora Zicai	(Germany) VfL Wolfsburg	3
4	(Netherlands) Gerda Konst	(Portugal) Torreense	2
4	(Slovenia) Lara Prašnikar	(Germany) VfL Wolfsburg	2
6	37 players		1

== See also ==
- 2026–27 UEFA Women's Champions League
- 2026–27 UEFA Champions League
- 2026–27 UEFA Europa League
- 2026–27 UEFA Conference League
- 2026 UEFA Super Cup
- 2026–27 UEFA Youth League
