= Sarah Foley =

American soccer player (born 2003)

Personal information
- Full name: Sarah Marie Foley
- Date of birth: September 23, 2003 (age 23)
- Height: 5 ft 5 in (1.65 m)
- Position: Forward

Team information
- Current team: Bodø/Glimt
- Number: 21

Youth career
- Lou Fusz
- 2019–2022: Belleville West Maroons

College career
Years	Team	Apps	(Gls)
2022–2025	Illinois Fighting Illini	69	(22)

Senior career*
Years	Team	Apps	(Gls)
2026–	Bodø/Glimt	21	(3)
- * Club domestic league appearances and goals as of November 7, 2026

Sarah Marie Foley (born September 23, 2003) is an American professional soccer player who plays as a forward for Norwegian First Division club Bodø/Glimt. She played college soccer for the Illinois Fighting Illini.

== Early life ==
Foley grew up in the St. Louis suburb of Belleville, Illinois. She played club soccer for Lou Fusz Athletic, winning the USYS under-16 national title in 2019. She committed to play college soccer for Illinois in her junior year at Belleville High School-West.

== College career ==
Foley scored 2 goals in 13 games for the Illinois Fighting Illini as a freshman in 2022. She almost quit the sport after her freshman season but soon rediscovered her love for the game. She became a starter as a sophomore in 2023, scoring 2 goals in 17 games. In her junior year in 2024, she scored a career-high 11 goals in 18 games, the most by an Illinois player since Jannelle Flaws in 2015, and earned second-team All-Big Ten honors. After longtime head coach Janet Rayfield retired, she led Illinois to an impressive start in her senior year under Katie Hultin in 2025, with her first goal of the season making SportsCenter's top 10 plays. She started all 21 games, co-led the team with 7 goals, and had a career-high 3 assists, being named second-team All-Big Ten for the second time. She helped lead the Fighting Illini to their first Big Ten tournament berth since 2020, their first NCAA tournament berth since 2013, and their highest win total since 2011.

== Club career ==
Foley trained with the National Women's Soccer League (NWSL)'s Houston Dash as a non-roster invitee in the 2026 preseason. In March 2026, she signed her first professional contract with Norwegian club Bodø/Glimt in the far north of the country. She made her professional debut in a season-opening 1–1 draw away to Røa. On May 26, she scored her first professional goal, just the club's third of the season, as they were beaten 7–1 by Vålerenga. On September 25, she assisted the winning goal against Røa in a 2–1 victory, Bodø's only win of the season. She ended the season with 3 goals and 3 assists as Bodø were relegated after two years in the top flight.

== Honors and awards ==
Individual

- Second-team All-Big Ten: 2024, 2025
