= Csilla Balázs =

Hungarian–Romanian footballer (born 1996)

Csilla Balasz
Personal information
- Full name: Csilla Balázs
- Date of birth: 23 July 1996 (age 30)
- Position: Defender

Team information
- Current team: Diósgyőr
- Number: 16

Senior career*
Years	Team	Apps	(Gls)
2018–	Diósgyőr	33	(0)

International career^{‡}
2013–2015	Romania U19	5	(0)
2019–	Romania	1	(0)
- * Club domestic league appearances and goals ‡ National team caps and goals as of 12 November 2019

Csilla Balázs (born 23 July 1996), misspelled as Csilla Balasz, is a Hungarian–Romanian footballer who plays as a defender for Diósgyőri VTK and the Romania women's national team.
