= Thiril Erichsen =

Norwegian footballer (born 2004)

Personal information
- Full name: Thiril Rækstad Erichsen
- Date of birth: 26 March 2004 (age 22)
- Position: Goalkeeper

Team information
- Current team: Aalesund
- Number: 1

Youth career
- Hakadal
- –2017: Varpe
- 2018–2019: Nittedal
- 2020: Fjellhamar

Senior career*
Years	Team	Apps	(Gls)
2021–2024	LSK Kvinner	13	(0)
2024–2025	Vålerenga	11	(0)
2026–	Aalesund	15	(0)

International career^{‡}
2019	Norway U15	2	(0)
2020	Norway U16	2	(0)
2021	Norway U18	1	(0)
2022	Norway U19	1	(0)
2025	Norway U23	5	(0)
- * Club domestic league appearances and goals as of 14 September 2026 ‡ National team caps and goals as of 14 September 2026

Thiril Erichsen (born 26 March 2004) is a Norwegian footballer who plays as a goalkeeper for Aalesunds FK.

== Career ==
Erichsen hails from Nittedal and started her career in minnows Hakadal IL and Varpe BK. Via Nittedal IL she joined Fjellhamar FK in 2020. She also made appearances for most Norway youth national teams. In 2021 she was signed by one of Norway's largest clubs, LSK Kvinner FK. She made her LSK debut in the 2021 cup followed by her Toppserien debut in October 2021 against Stabæk.

In 2023, Erichsen helped LSK win the Youth Cup, being named Woman of the Match in the cup final. In 2024 Erichsen became LSK's first-choice goalkeeper after Cecilie Fiskerstrand moved abroad. However, LSK Kvinner was on the verge of bankruptcy and had to offload Erichsen to competitors Vålerenga.

Having won the 2024 and 2025 cups with Vålerenga, Erichsen pursued even more playing time and transferred to Aalesunds FK. Following a hiatus from the youth national teams, Erichsen returned to Norway U23. Among others, she helped the team beat Germany U23. With Aalesund she reached the 2026 cup final, but lost to Brann.
