= Waver, Netherlands =

Waver
- Hamlet
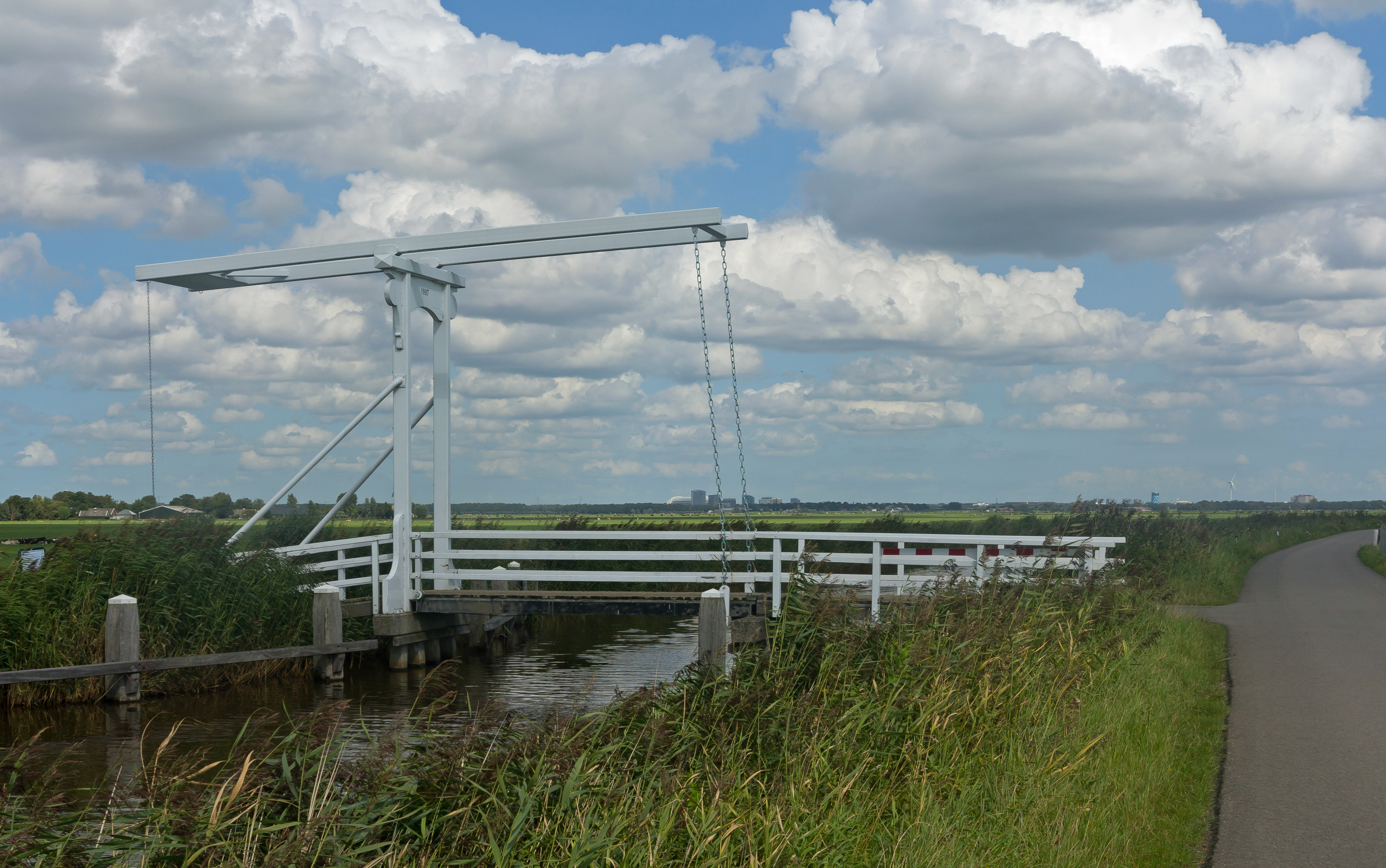
- Bridge between Waver and Uithoorn

- Location in the Netherlands Location in the province of North Holland in the Netherlands
- Coordinates: 52°15′10″N 4°54′28″E
- Country: Netherlands
- Province: North Holland
- Municipality: Ouder-Amstel
- Time zone: UTC+1 (CET)
  - Summer (DST): UTC+2 (CEST)

Waver is a hamlet in the Dutch province of North Holland. It is a part of the municipality of Ouder-Amstel, and lies about 13 km south of Amsterdam.

Waver is not a statistical entity, and is considered part of Ouderkerk aan de Amstel. Waver has place name signs and consists of about 40 houses.

== Radio stations (local) ==
The local radio station for Duivendrecht is Jamm FM 104.9 'Smooth & Funky'.
