= Anna Aahjem =

Norwegian footballer (born 2000)

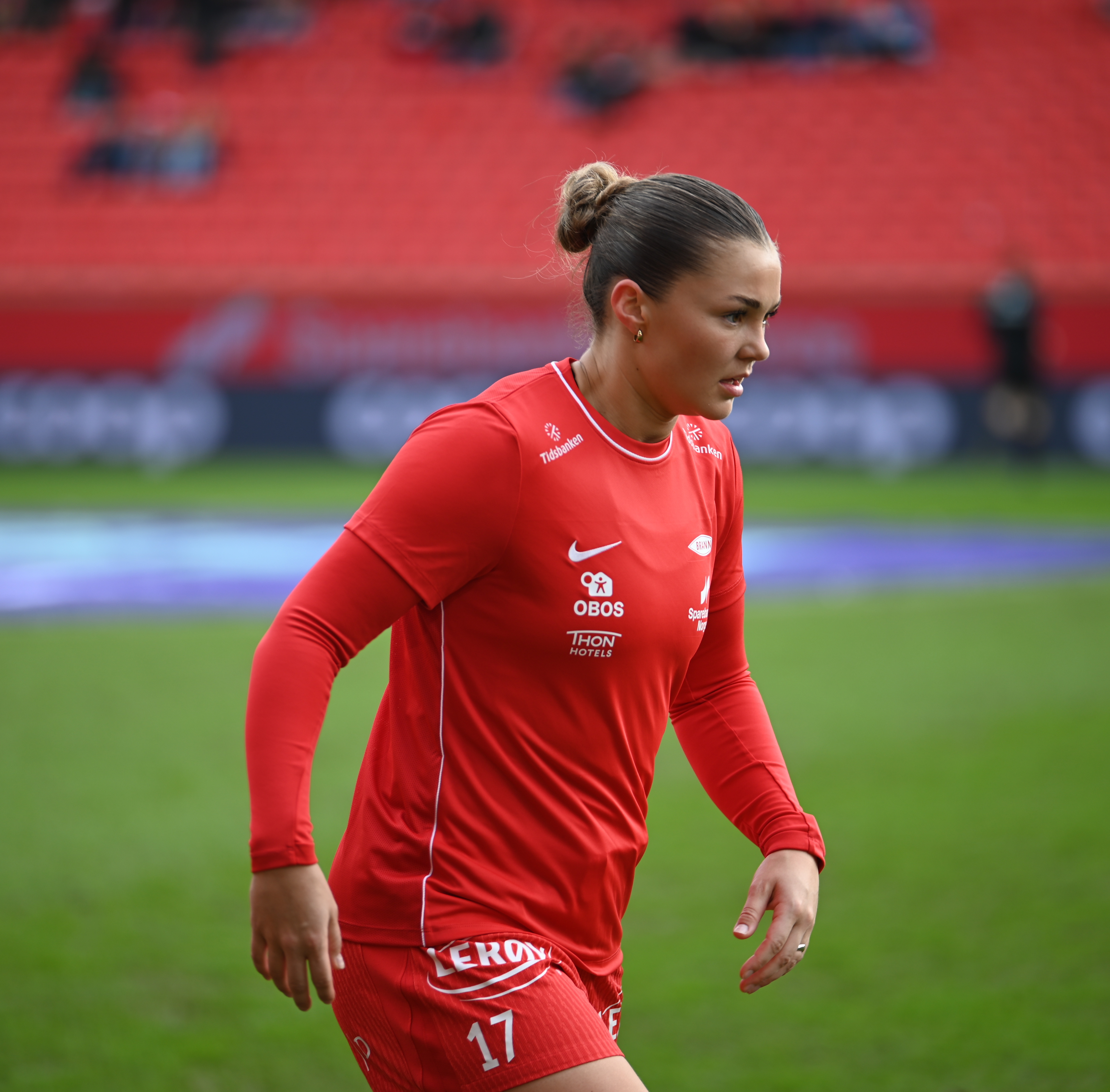
- Anna Aahjem in 2026

Personal information
- Full name: Anna Nerland Aahjem
- Date of birth: 19 January 2000 (age 26)
- Place of birth: Norway
- Position: Forward

Team information
- Current team: Brann
- Number: 17

Youth career
- 2014–2016: Åheim
- 2016–2019: Hødd

Senior career*
| Years | Team | Apps | (Gls) |
| 2015 | Åheim/Selje | 2 | (0) |
| 2016–2019 | Hødd | 41 | (35) |
| 2017 | Hødd 2 | 1 | (2) |
| 2019–2023 | Lyn | 84 | (31) |
| 2019–2021 | Lyn 2 | 16 | (18) |
| 2023– | Brann | 32 | (23) |

International career^{‡}
| 2024 | Norway U23 | 2 | (0) |
- * Club domestic league appearances and goals as of 25 April 2025 ‡ National team caps and goals as of 20 October 2024

Anna Nerland Aahjem (born 19 January 2000) is a Norwegian professional footballer who plays as a forward for Toppserien club Brann.

== Career statistics ==
=== Club ===
As of 25 April 2025.

| Club | Season | League | | | Norwegian Cup | | Champions League | | Other | | Total | |
| Club | Season | Division | Apps | Goals | Apps | Goals | Apps | Goals | Apps | Goals | Apps | Goals |
|---|---|---|---|---|---|---|---|---|---|---|---|---|
| Åheim/Selje | 2015 | Third Division | 2 | 0 | — | | — | | 0 | 0 | 2 | 0 |
| Hødd 2 | 2017 | Fourth Division | 1 | 2 | — | | — | | 0 | 0 | 1 | 2 |
| Hødd | 2016 | Second Division | 8 | 4 | — | | — | | 0 | 0 | 8 | 4 |
| Hødd | 2017 | Third Division | 6 | 6 | — | | — | | 0 | 0 | 6 | 6 |
| Hødd | 2018 | Third Division | 16 | 17 | — | | — | | 2 (Note: Appearances in Second Division play-offs) | 0 | 18 | 17 |
| Hødd | 2019 | Second Division | 9 | 8 | — | | — | | 0 | 0 | 9 | 8 |
| Hødd | Total | | 39 | 35 | — | | — | | 2 | 0 | 41 | 35 |
| Lyn 2 | 2019 | Second Division | 8 | 7 | — | | — | | 0 | 0 | 8 | 7 |
| Lyn 2 | 2021 | Second Division | 8 | 11 | — | | — | | 0 | 0 | 8 | 11 |
| Lyn 2 | Total | | 16 | 18 | — | | — | | 0 | 0 | 16 | 18 |
| Lyn | 2019 | Toppserien | 2 | 0 | 0 | 0 | — | | 2 (Note: Appearances in Toppserien play-offs) | 0 | 4 | 0 |
| Lyn | 2020 | Toppserien | 10 | 0 | 1 | 1 | — | | 0 | 0 | 11 | 1 |
| Lyn | 2021 | Toppserien | 15 | 4 | 0 | 0 | — | | 2 | 1 | 17 | 5 |
| Lyn | 2022 | Toppserien | 25 | 9 | 2 | 0 | — | | 0 | 0 | 27 | 9 |
| Lyn | 2023 | Toppserien | 22 | 13 | 3 | 3 | — | | 0 | 0 | 25 | 16 |
| Lyn | Total | | 74 | 26 | 6 | 4 | — | | 4 | 1 | 84 | 31 |
| Brann | 2024 | Toppserien | 27 | 18 | 4 | 1 | 2 | 0 | 0 | 0 | 33 | 19 |
| Brann | 2025 | Toppserien | 5 | 5 | 0 | 0 | 0 | 0 | 0 | 0 | 5 | 5 |
| Brann | Total | | 32 | 23 | 4 | 1 | 2 | 0 | — | | 36 | 24 |
| Career total | | | 164 | 104 | 10 | 5 | 2 | 0 | 6 | 1 | 182 | 110 |
