= Sarah Suphellen =

Norwegian footballer (born 1998)

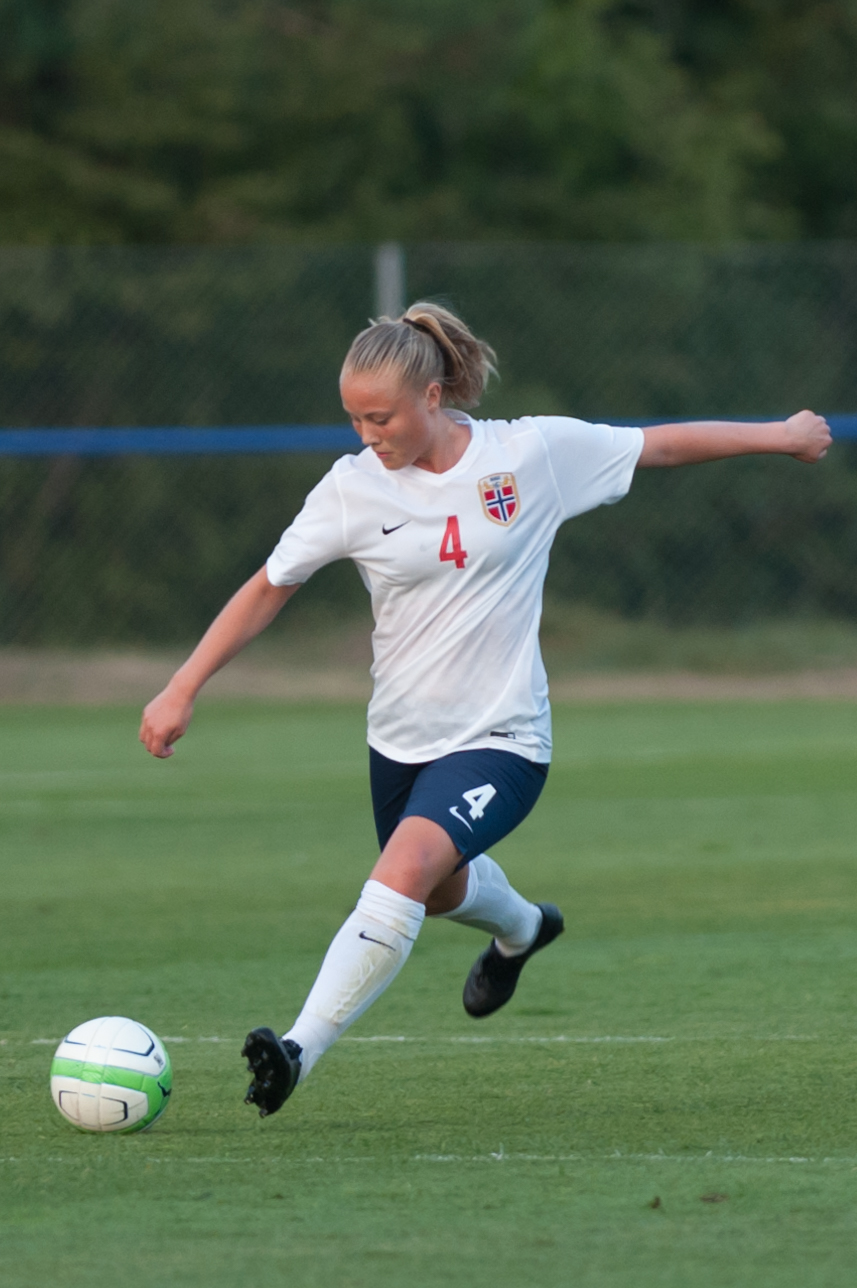

Personal information
- Full name: Sarah Alexandra Lilleberg Suphellen
- Date of birth: 10 July 1998 (age 28)
- Positions: Centre-back; left-back

Team information
- Current team: Røa
- Number: 3

Youth career
- –2014: Nardo
- 2014: Trondheims-Ørn

Senior career*
Years	Team	Apps	(Gls)
2015–2018	Trondheims-Ørn	59	(1)
2018–2019	LSK Kvinner	14	(0)
2019–	Røa	144	(3)

International career
2014	Norway U16	7	(1)
2014–2015	Norway U17	9	(0)
2015–2017	Norway U19	21	(3)
2018–2019	Norway U23	6	(0)
- * Club domestic league appearances and goals as of 20 June 2026

Sarah Suphellen (born 10 July 1998) is a Norwegian footballer who plays as a centre-back for Røa IL.

== Career ==
Hailing from Trondheim and starting her youth career in Nardo FK, she moved to the dominant team in the city, SK Trondheims-Ørn, in the summer of 2014. She made her first-team debut in March 2015 against Sandviken. She also represented Norway internationally from the U16 category up to the U23 team.

At a time when Trondheims-Ørn struggled against relegation from the 2018 Toppserien, Suphellen was recruited to reigning Norwegian league champions LSK Kvinner FK. Suphellen and LSK Kvinner also competed in Europe, reaching the quarter-finals of the 2018–19 UEFA Women's Champions League.

Halfway into 2019, Suphellen moved to Røa IL. She was not able to play due to a knee injury, but was finally cleared to play her first Røa match in August 2020. Røa were relegated to the 2021 First Division, but gained re-promotion after that single season. Suphellen now served as the team captain. In mid-2024 she extended her contract to the end of 2027. She played her 200th Toppserien game on 15 August 2026.

== Personal life ==
Outside of football, Suphellen studied medicine.
