= Ouder-Amstel =

- Municipality
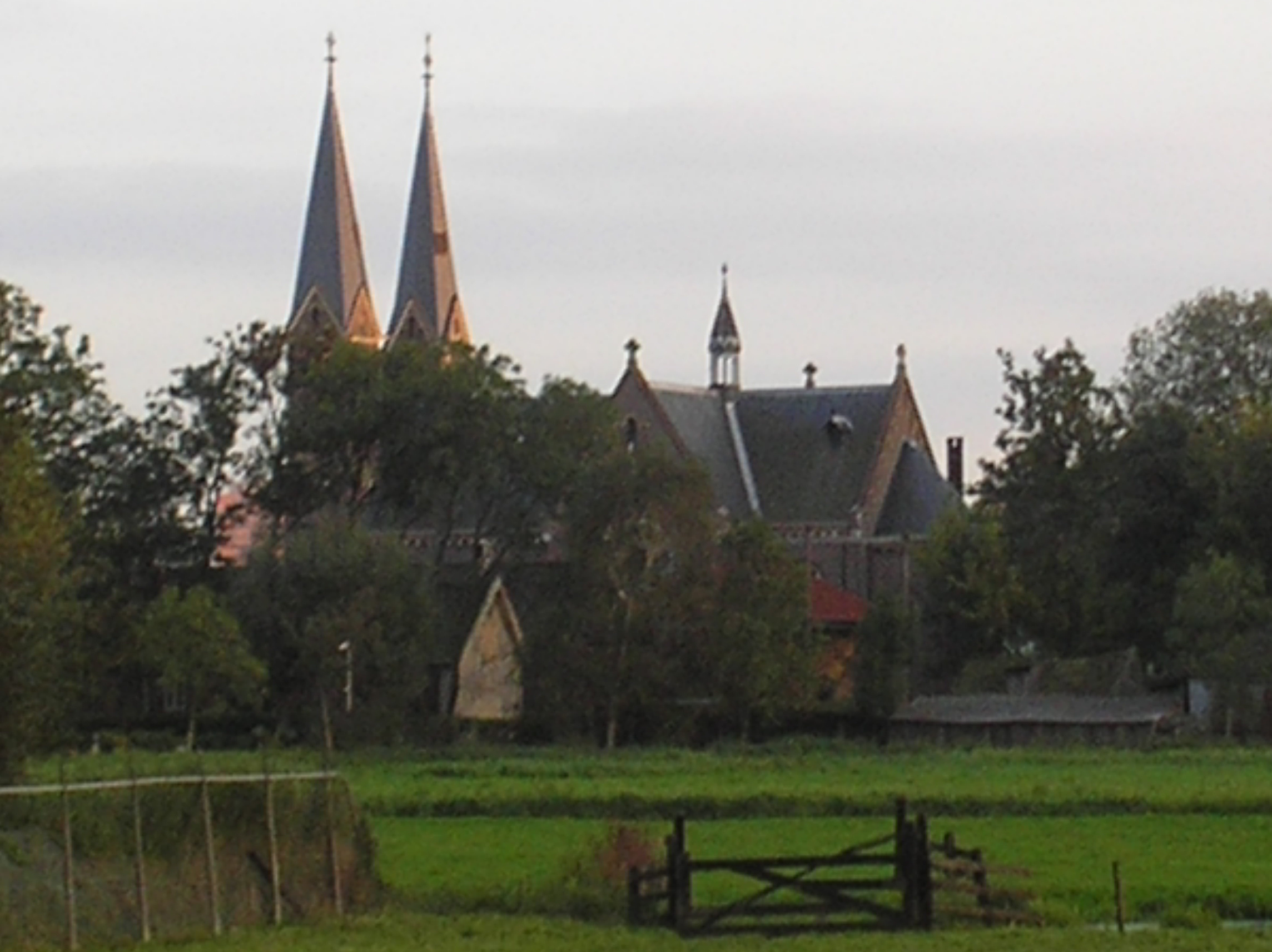
- Church in Duivendrecht

- Flag Coat of arms

- Location in North Holland
- Coordinates: 52°18′N 4°54′E
- Country: Netherlands
- Province: North Holland

Government
  - Body: Municipal council
  - Mayor: Joke Geldhof (D66)

Area
  - Total: 25.78 km^{2} (9.95 sq mi)
  - Land: 24.08 km^{2} (9.30 sq mi)
  - Water: 1.70 km^{2} (0.66 sq mi)
- Elevation: −1 m (−3.3 ft)

Population (January 2021)
  - Total: 14,125
  - Density: 587/km^{2} (1,520/sq mi)
- Time zone: UTC+1 (CET)
  - Summer (DST): UTC+2 (CEST)
- Postcode: 1115, 1190–1191
- Area code: 020
- Website: www.ouder-amstel.nl

Ouder-Amstel (Dutch pronunciation: [ˌʌudər ˈɑmstəl]) is a municipality in the Netherlands on the river Amstel, in the province of North Holland. It is 5 km (3.1 mi) south of the centre of Amsterdam.

== Population centres ==
The municipality of Ouder-Amstel consists of the towns and villages of Duivendrecht, Ouderkerk aan de Amstel and Waver and the cadastral populated place of Amsterdam-Duivendrecht.

=== Topography ===
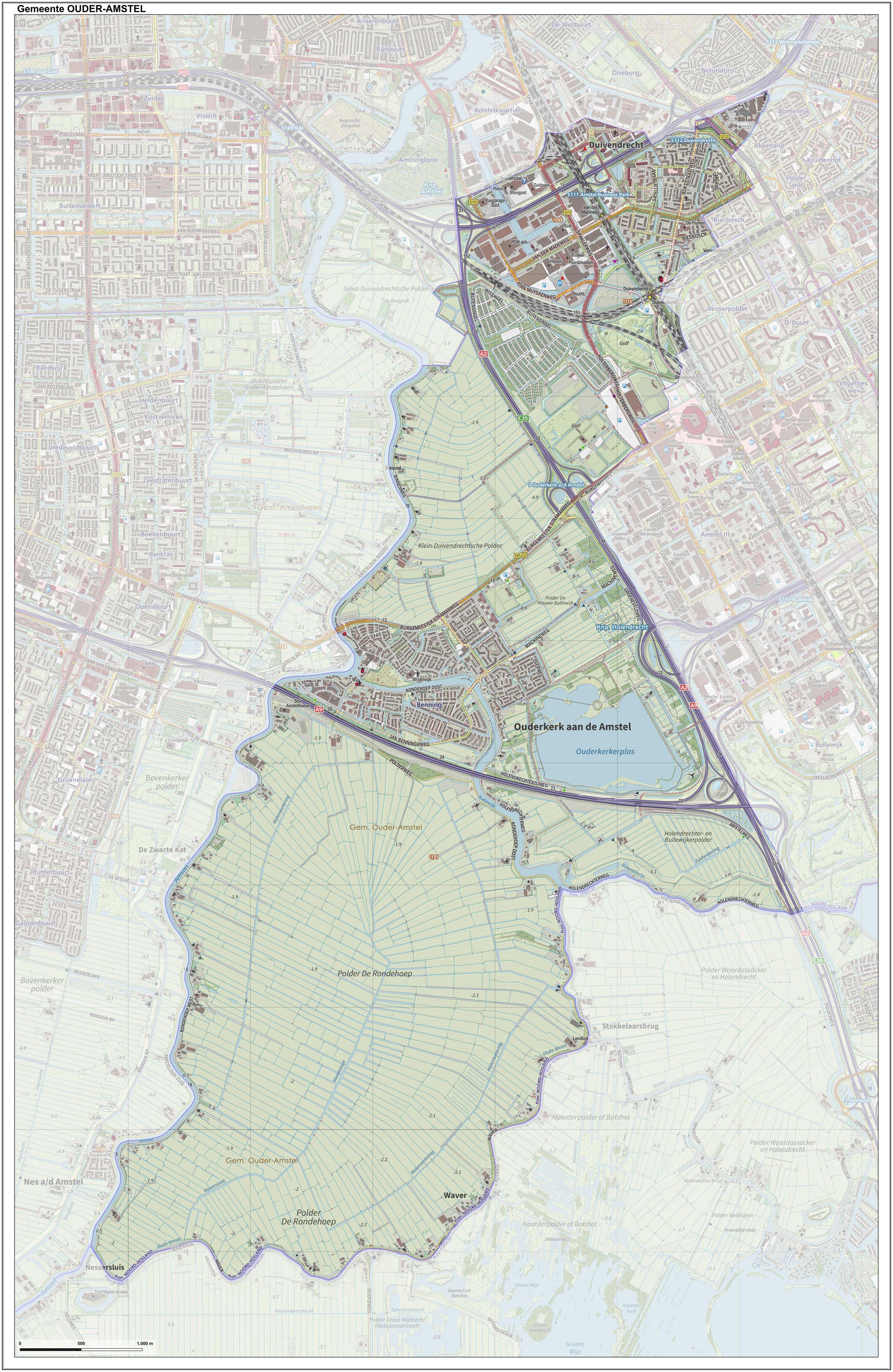
Map of the municipality of Ouder-Amstel, June 2015

== Local government ==
The municipal council of Ouder-Amstel consists of 15 seats, which at the 2026 municipal election divided as follows:

- GroenLinks / PvdA - 4 seats
- VVD - 3 seats
- D66 - 3 seats
- Natuurlijk Belang - 2 seats
- Ouder-Amstel Anders - 1 seat
- CDA - 1 seat
- Amstelland Lokaal - 1 seat

== Radio station ==
The local radio station for Duivendrecht is Jamm fm 104.9 Smooth & Funky.

== Notable people ==
- Gijsbrecht IV of Amstel (ca.1235–ca.1303) a powerful lord and member of the Van Aemstel family.
- Wim Eijk (born 1953 in Duivendrecht) a Dutch prelate of the Catholic Church, a cardinal and Archbishop of Utrecht
- Femke Wolting (born 1970 in Ouder-Amstel) a Dutch independent new media producer
- Meindert Klem (born 1987 in Ouderkerk aan de Amstel) a rower, competed in the 2008 and 2012 Summer Olympics

== Gallery ==
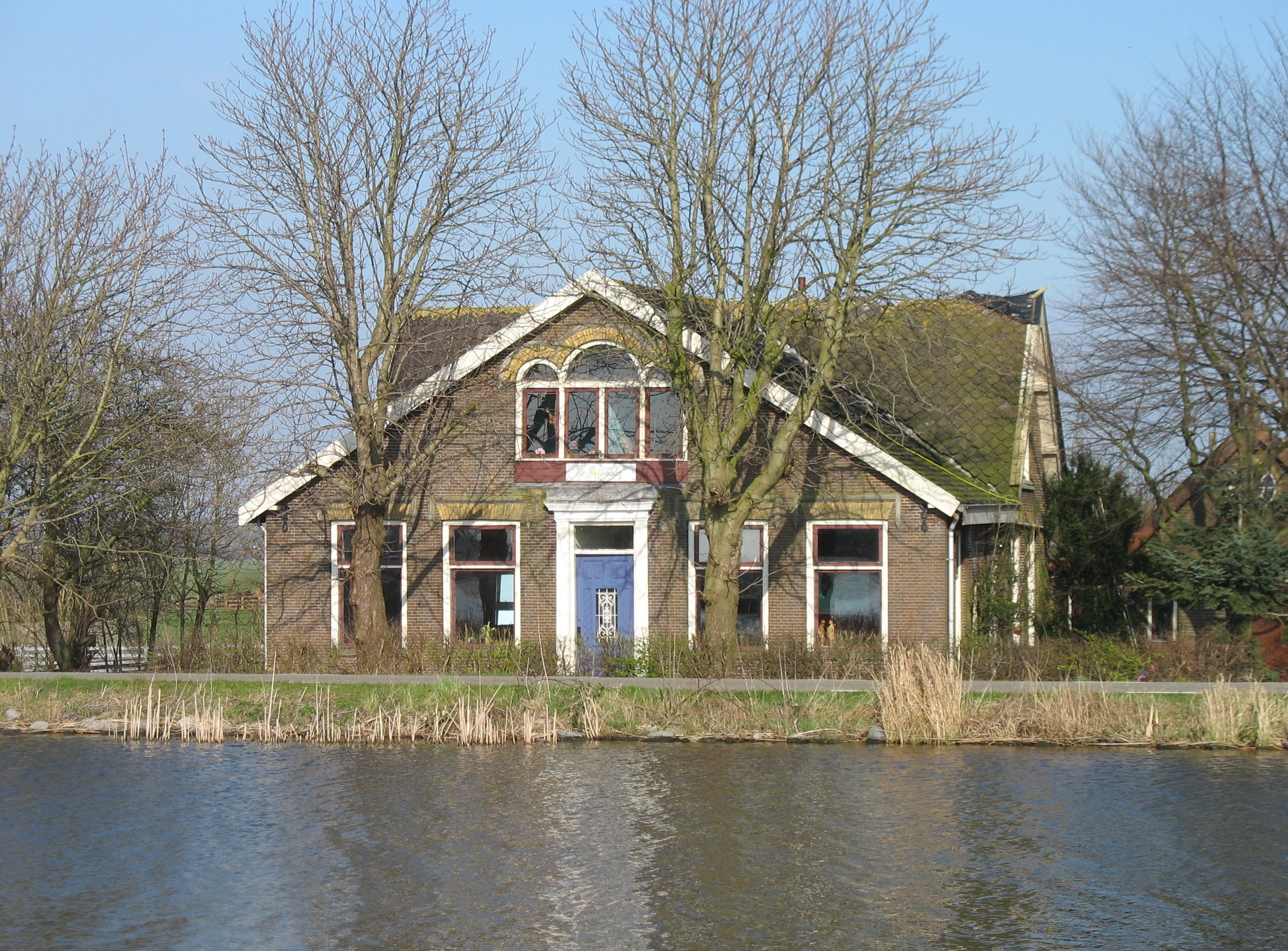
"De Sollenburg" Ronde Hoep west 49

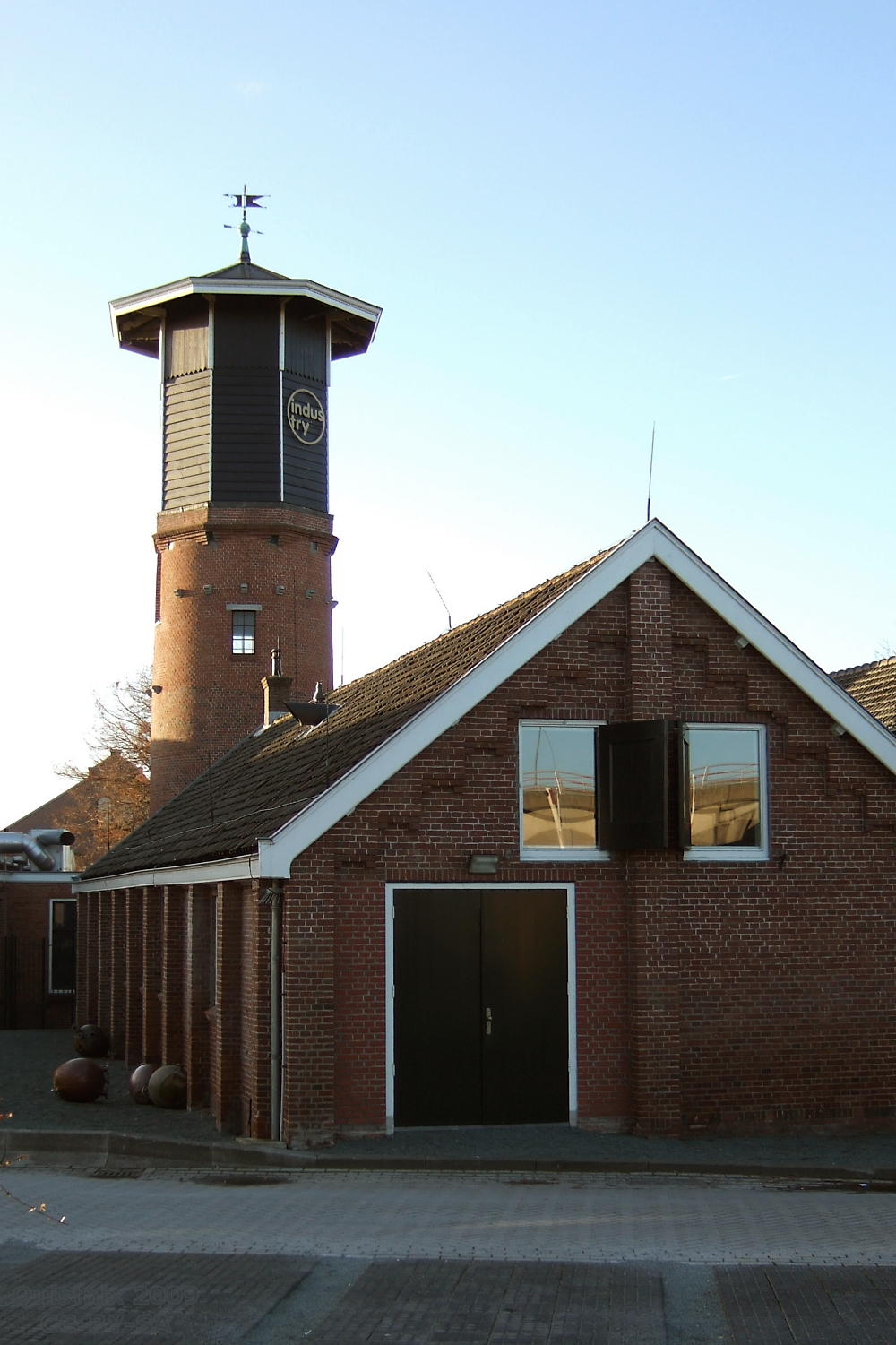
Water tower, De Oude Molen gunpowder factory

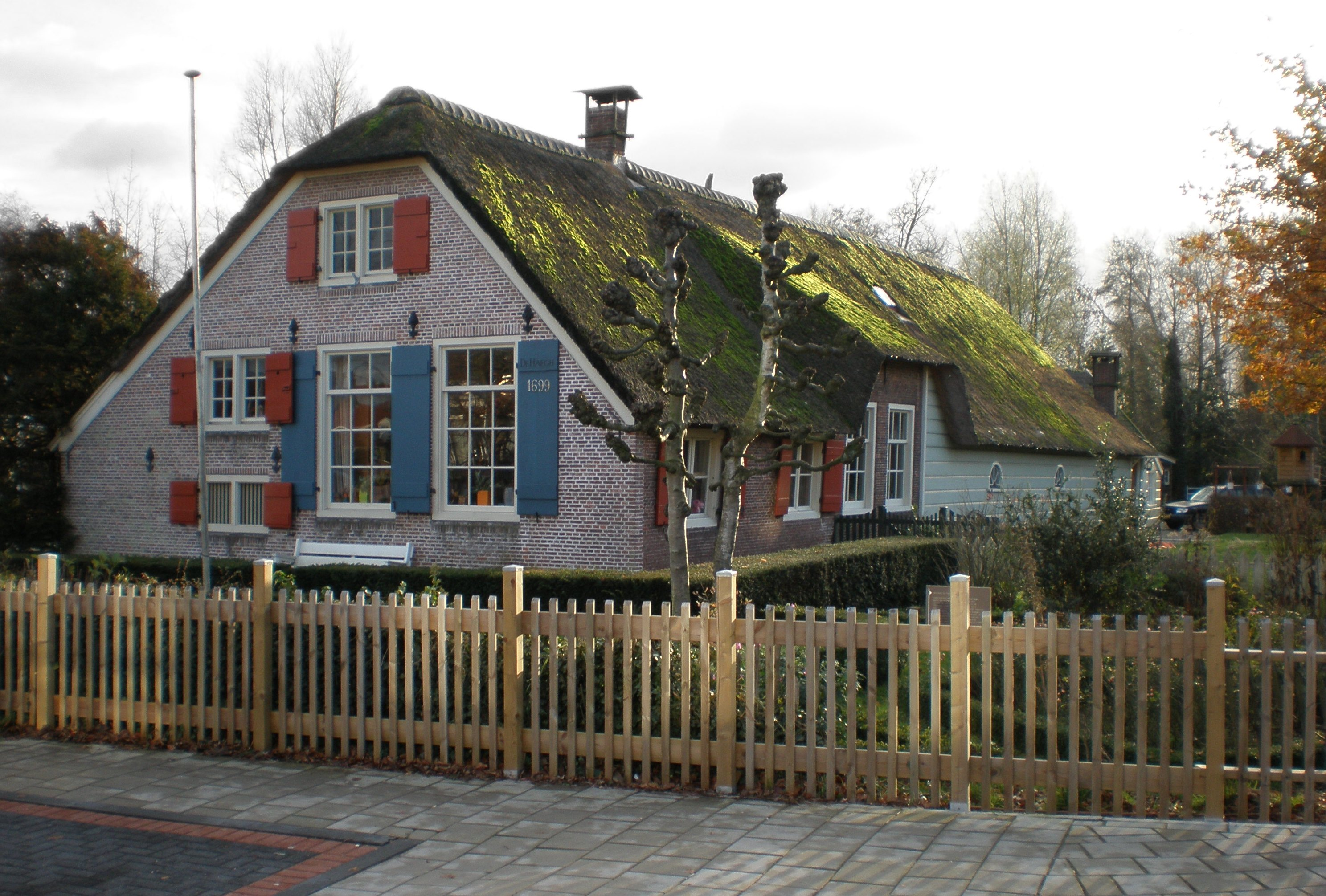
Ouderkerk aan de Amstel De Haegh Farm

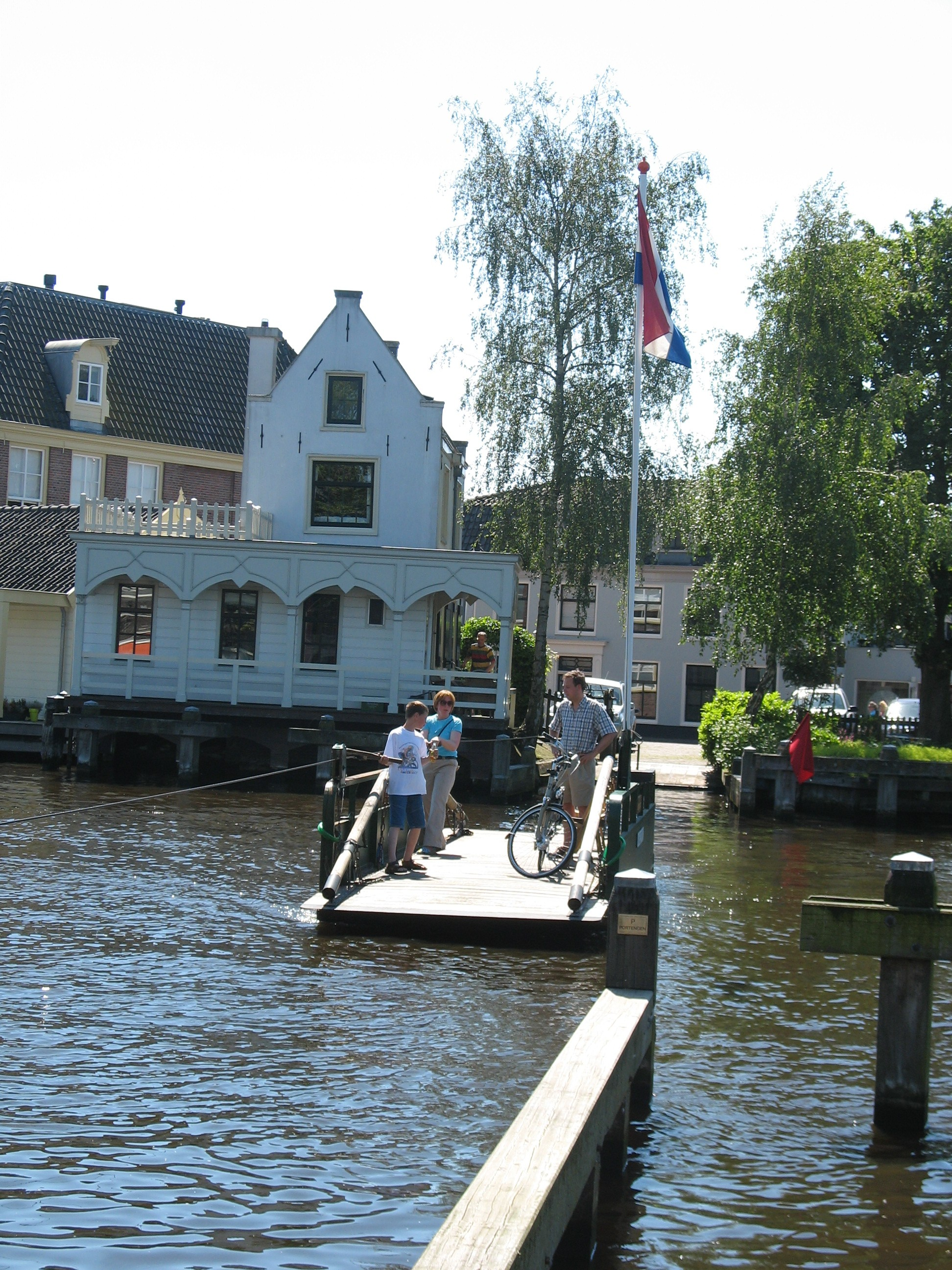
Pontveer Ouderkerk on the Amstel

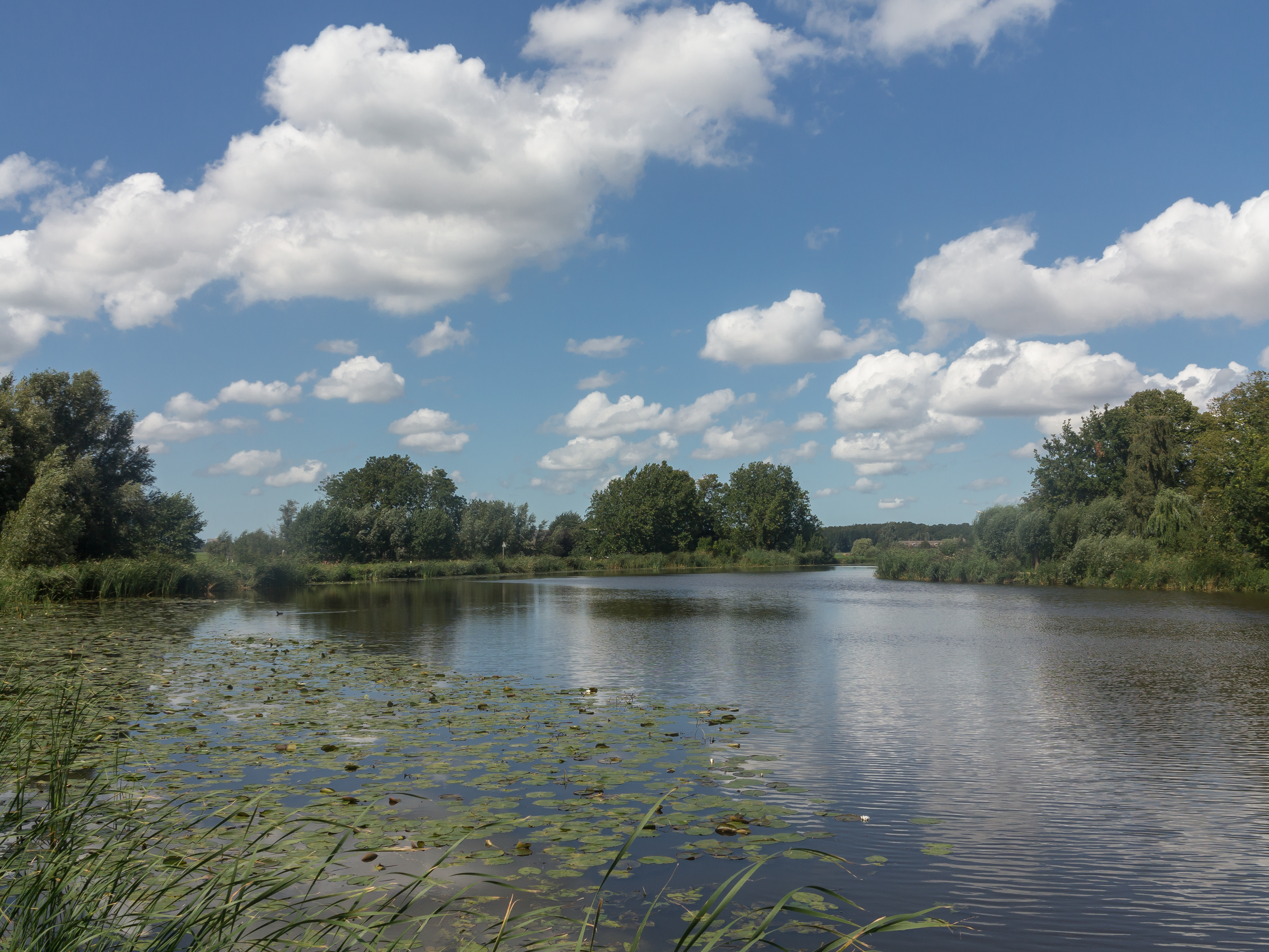
Ouderkerk ad Amstel, view of the Ronde Hoep
