= Eugenia Gil Soriano =

Spanish football referee (born 1996)

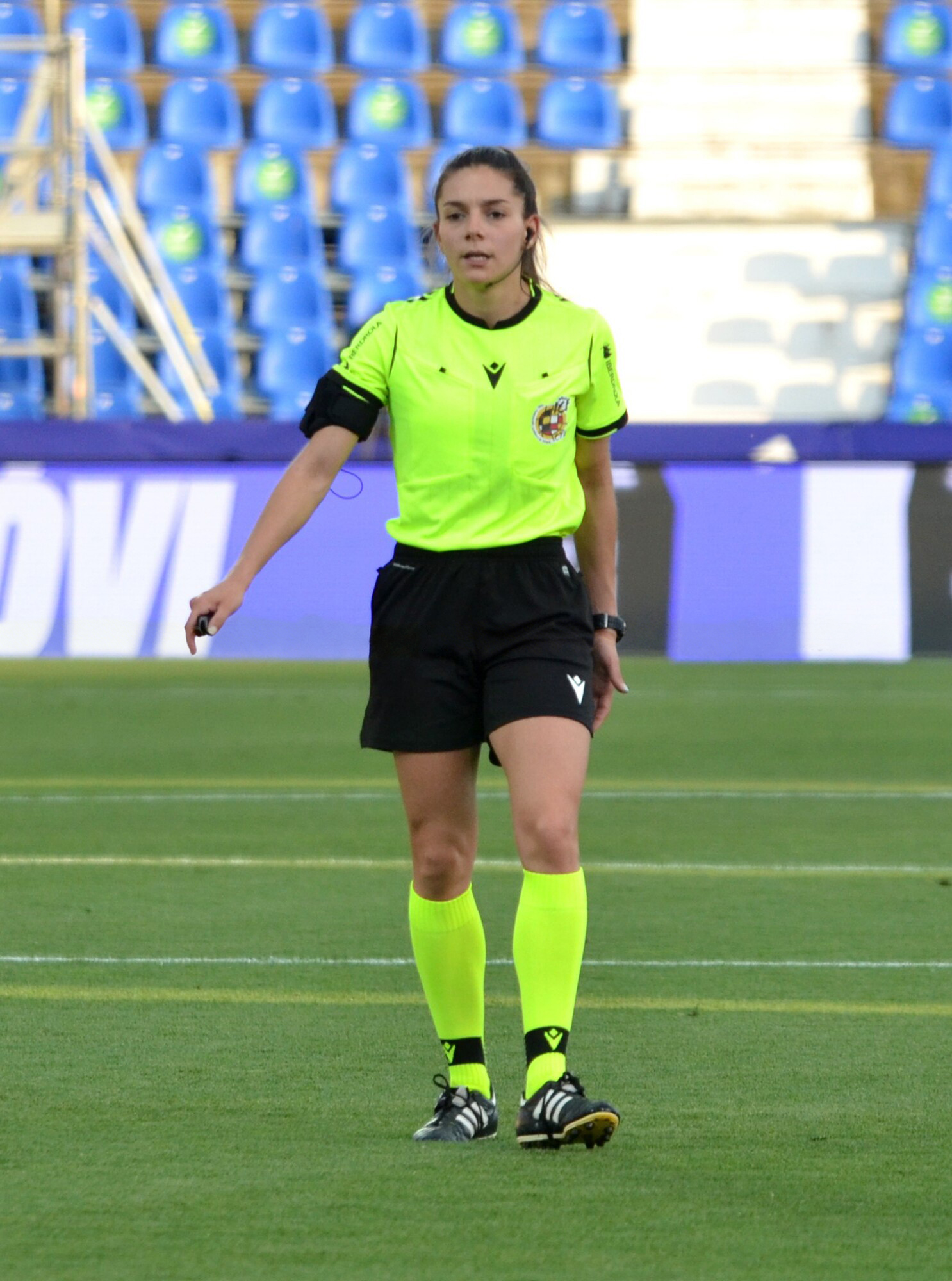
- Full name: María Eugenia Gil Soriano
- Born: 15 January 1996 (age 30); Mérida, Spain
- Other occupation: Sprinter

Domestic
Years	League	Role
2019–present	Liga F	Referee
2024–present	Primera Federación	Referee

International
Years	League	Role
2024–present	FIFA	Referee

María Eugenia Gil Soriano (born 15 January 1996) is a Spanish football referee who has also competed as a sprinter. Born in Mérida, she officiates in Liga F and the men's Primera Federación, and belongs to the Galician referees' committee. She was the principal referee for the final of the 2024 Copa de la Reina and for the 2026 Supercopa de España Femenina final.

== Athletics ==
Alongside her refereeing, Gil Soriano has competed as a sprinter, specialising in the 400 metres. She was a Spanish under-23 runner-up in the event and a multiple-time champion of Galicia. She ran for the Sociedad Gimnástica de Pontevedra, having earlier competed for Robert Morris University in Pittsburgh, in the United States.

== Refereeing career ==
Gil Soriano made her debut in Liga F, the top division of Spanish women's football, in the 2019–20 season, alongside Xiomara Díaz García. For the 2020–21 season she was named the best referee in the women's first division at the MARCA women's sport awards, becoming the first member of the Galician committee to receive the distinction. She had earlier served as an assistant referee at the 2019 junior Copa de Campeones, refereed a women's Supercopa de España semi-final in 2022, and moved into men's football in Segunda Federación in 2023. In 2024 she was promoted to the men's Primera Federación and was included on FIFA's list of international referees.

The 2024 Copa de la Reina final, played at La Romareda in Zaragoza between Barcelona and Real Sociedad, was directed by an all-female refereeing team. The 2026 Supercopa de España Femenina final, her second Clásico, was held at the Estadio Castalia in Castellón, where Barcelona faced Real Madrid.
