= Brenna Lovera =

American soccer player (born 1997)

- Lovera with Brann in 2026

Personal information
- Full name: Brenna Marie Lovera
- Date of birth: March 12, 1997 (age 29)
- Place of birth: Milford, Michigan, U.S.
- Height: 5 ft 8 in (1.73 m)
- Position: Forward

Team information
- Current team: Brann

College career
Years	Team	Apps	(Gls)
2015–2018	Northwestern Wildcats	74	(19)

Senior career*
Years	Team	Apps	(Gls)
2019	ÍBV	9	(6)
2020	Boavista	5	(2)
2021–2022	Selfoss	34	(21)
2023	Chicago Red Stars	0	(0)
2023–2025	Glasgow City	49	(28)
2025–	Brann	34	(30)
- * Club domestic league appearances and goals as of November 1, 2026

Brenna Marie Lovera (born March 12, 1997) is an American professional soccer player who plays as a forward for Toppserien club Brann. She played college soccer for the Northwestern Wildcats. She has also previously played for ÍBV and Selfoss in Iceland, Boavista in Portugal, the Chicago Red Stars of the National Women's Soccer League (NWSL), and Glasgow City in Scotland. She won the Icelandic league's Golden Boot with Selfoss in 2021.

== Career ==
She played college soccer for the Northwestern Wildcats and was named to the All-Big Ten Second Team in 2018.

Lovera joined ÍBV in July 2019. In 9 matches for ÍBV, she scored 6 goals.

After playing for Boavista in Portugal in 2020, Lovera returned to Iceland and signed with Selfoss in March 2021. She had a standout season for Selfoss, winning the Golden Boot with 13 goals in 16 matches.

She signed a two-year contract extension with Selfoss in September 2021. On June 10, 2022, she scored a hat-trick in a 4–1 win against Þór/KA in the Icelandic Cup.

Chicago Red Stars signed Lovera to an injury replacement player contract in March 2023. She made one appearance in the NWSL Challenge Cup on May 3 against Houston Dash before being released on June 28, 2023.

Following her release from Chicago, Lovera signed for Scottish Women's Premier League champions Glasgow City, agreeing a two-year deal with the Scottish club, becoming the club's fourth signing of the summer, she was given the club's number nine jersey ahead of the new campaign. Lovera would score her first goal for Glasgow City on August 27, 2023, in a match against Rangers at Broadwood Stadium. The goal came in the 52nd minute, levelling the score at 1-1 after a 50-yard run and assist from Lauren Davidson. Lovera would go on to score two goals in the UEFA Women's Champions League qualifying stages, before an Achilles injury prematurely ended her campaign.

She would return in September 2024, and played a crucial role in Glasgow City's season, scoring a number of goals against title rivals Rangers, Celtic and Hibs, and ended the campaign the club's top goal scorer with 18 league goals. Lovera would turn down a new contract with Glasgow City in May 2025, however, and departed Petershill the following month.

Lovera would agree a two-and-half-year deal with Norwegian outfit Brann in July 2025. On November 1, 2026, she scored twice in a 4–1 victory over LSK as Brann clinched their second consecutive league title.

== Honors and awards ==
Brann

- Toppserien: 2025, 2026

Individual

- Besta deild kvenna top scorer: 2021
- Second-team All-Big Ten: 2018
