= Leïla Maknoun =

Association football player (born 1992)

Personal information
- Date of birth: 19 January 1992 (age 34)
- Place of birth: Paris, France
- Height: 1.76 m (5 ft 9 in)
- Position: Forward

Team information
- Current team: Apulia Trani

Youth career
- 2007–2008: Paris FC 2000
- 2010–2011: Paris Saint-Germain

Senior career*
Years	Team	Apps	(Gls)
2008–2009	Saint-Maur B		
2009–2010	Blanc-Mesnil	16	(4)
2011–2012	Paris Saint-Germain B	1	(2)
2012–2013	Paris Saint-Germain	1	(1)
2013–2014	Guingamp	11	(0)
2015–2016	Issy	9	(7)
2016–2017	Rouen	10	(5)
2017–2018	Aurillac Arpajon	3	(1)
2018–2019	OSNY		
2019–2022	Paris UC		
2022–	Apulia Trani		

International career^{‡}
2007	France U16	1	(0)
2010	Tunisia U19		
2012	Tunisia U20	3	(4)
2014–	Tunisia	4	(2)
- * Club domestic league appearances and goals ‡ National team caps and goals as of 9 July 2015

Leïla Maknoun (Arabic: ليلى مكنون; born 19 January 1992) is a footballer who plays as a forward for Italian Serie B club Apulia Trani.

Born in France, she represented her native country internationally at under-16 level, before switching allegiance to Tunisia in 2010, making her senior debut in 2014.

== Club career ==
Maknoun played for Paris FC, Saint-Maur B, Blanc-Mesnil and then PSG U19, PSG B and the first team of PSG. She later played mostly in the second division. In January 2022, she moved to Apulia Trani in Italy.

== Career statistics ==
=== International ===
Scores and results list Tunisia's goal tally first

No.	Date	Venue	Opponent	Score	Result	Competition	Ref.
1	16 February 2014	Al Ahly Training Centre, 6th October City, Egypt	Egypt	1	3–0	2016 Africa Women Cup of Nations qualification	
2	27 August 2021	Police Academy Stadium, Cairo, Egypt	Sudan	1	12–1	2021 Arab Women's Cup	
3	20 October 2021	Petro Sport Stadium, Cairo, Egypt	Egypt	1	6–2	2022 Africa Women Cup of Nations qualification	

== See also ==
- List of Tunisia women's international footballers
