= Per Inge Jacobsen =

Norwegian football manager (born 1981)

Personal information
- Date of birth: 25 August 1981 (age 45)
- Place of birth: Haugesund, Norway

Team information
- Current team: Norway U23 women (manager)

Senior career*
Years	Team	Apps	(Gls)
- Stegaberg

Managerial career
- 2002–2005: Randaberg (youth)
- 2005–2012: Vålerenga (developer)
- 2013–2016: Nordstrand
- 2017: Avaldsnes women
- 2018–2019: India (assistant)
- 2019–2022: Stabæk women
- 2023–: Norway U23 women
- * Club domestic league appearances and goals

Per Inge Jacobsen (born 25 August 1981) is a Norwegian football manager.

Jacobsen spent his short playing career in Stegaberg, until it was cut short by injury. He instead started as a youth coach, and when moving to Stavanger for his higher education, he coached in Randaberg IL. He moved east in 2005 to become player developer in one of Norway's biggest clubs, Vålerenga IF. Following several years there, and working with the likes of Joshua King, Håvard Nielsen and Ghayas Zahid, Jacobsen wanted a head coach role and did so at fourth-tier club Nordstrand IF. He took them up from Norwegian 4. division to 3. division in 2014 an manage to get the team to a 6. place in the league (of 14). Jacobsen took over the women's team of Avaldsnes IL after the 2016 season.

With Jacobsen at the helm, Avaldsnes reached the Champions League, won the 2017 Norwegian Women's Cup and finished runners-up in the 2017 Toppserien. Still, there were disagreements with the club leadership, and Jacobsen left Avaldsnes shortly after star player Ingrid Ryland. Through a contact, he was able to get an in with Stephen Constantine, and was hired as assistant manager of India's national team.

In 2019, he was hired as manager of Stabæk Fotball Kvinner. Vanja Stefanovic had been sacked due to the club's poor standing in the 2019 Toppserien, and Jacobsen could not avoid relegation. However, he led the club to instant re-promotion and eventually finished runner-up in the 2022 Norwegian Women's Cup and fourth in the 2022 Toppserien. He resigned after the 2022 season only to be hired by the Football Association of Norway as head coach of the Norway U23 women's national team.
