= Léa Rubio =

French footballer (born 1991)

Personal information
- Full name: Léa Rubio
- Date of birth: 6 May 1991 (age 35)
- Place of birth: Avignon, France
- Height: 5 ft 5 in (1.65 m)
- Position: Midfielder

Team information
- Current team: Olympique de Marseille

Youth career
- 1998–2001: ASPTT Avignon
- 2001–2003: MJC Avignon
- 2003–2005: Le Pontet
- 2005–2006: Monteux

Senior career*
Years	Team	Apps	(Gls)
2006–2008	Monteux	30	(3)
2008–2010	Montpellier	28	(3)
2010–2013	Paris Saint-Germain	27	(2)
2013–	Olympique de Marseille	5	(5)

International career^{‡}
2006–2008	France U17	20	(6)
2009–2010	France U19	22	(6)
2010	France U20	2	(0)
2011–	France	1	(1)
- * Club domestic league appearances and goals as of 16 August 2013 (UTC) ‡ National team caps and goals as of 16 August 2013 (UTC)

Léa Rubio (born 6 May 1991 in Avignon) is a French football player who currently plays for French club Olympique de Marseille. Rubio plays as a midfielder and has been active with the France women's national football team on the youth circuit.

== Career ==
Rubio began her career at her hometown club in Football Club Féminin Monteux in the commune of Monteux. In 2006, at the age of 15, she made her league debut with the club, who were playing in the second division of French women's football. For the 2006–07 season, Rubio started 13 matches scoring no goals. The following season, her matches played increased to 15. She also scored three goals, including one in cup play and even captained the team on several occasions. For the 2008–09 season, Rubio was selected to train at CNFE Clairefontaine, the women's section of the prestigious Clairefontaine academy. However, she eventually signed with Montpellier. With Montpellier, Rubio was designated the first team number 8 and made 11 league appearances in her first season with the team. She appeared in three cup matches scoring one goal helping Montpellier win the 2008–09 edition of the Challenge de France.

Rubio got off to a fast start for the 2009–10 season scoring three goals in her first six league matches. She has also starred for the club in the newly created UEFA Women's Champions League appearing in four matches helping the club reach the main round.

== International career ==
Rubio has been active with the women's section of the national team. She has earned caps with the women's under-17, under-18, and under-19 teams. With the under-17 team, she participated in both the 2008 UEFA Women's Under-17 Championship and the inaugural 2008 FIFA U-17 Women's World Cup, where France were eliminated in the group stage. Rubio scored her lone goal in the tournament against the United States in the final group stage match. With the under-19s, Rubio played in the La Manga Cup international tournament and the 2009 UEFA Women's Under-19 Championship reached the semi-finals before bowing out to Sweden in extra time.

== International goals ==
No.	Date	Venue	Opponent	Score	Result	Competition
1.	26 October 2011	Stade de l'Aube, Troyes, France	Israel	5–0	5–0	UEFA Women's Euro 2013 qualifying
