= Fanny Lång =

Swedish footballer (born 1996)

Personal information
- Full name: Fanny Alicé Tess Lång
- Date of birth: 11 September 1996 (age 30)
- Place of birth: Borlänge, Sweden
- Position: Defender

Team information
- Current team: Stabæk

Senior career*
Years	Team	Apps	(Gls)
2012–2013	Gustafs GoIF	36	(2)
2014	Kvarnsvedens IK	2	(0)
2015	Gustafs GoIF	21	(2)
2016	IK Sirius	20	(2)
2017	IK Uppsala	22	(0)
2018	AIK	13	(1)
2019–2021	Djurgårdens IF	49	(3)
2022	Kolbotn	14	(1)
2023	Inter Milan	1	(0)
2023–	Stabæk	1	(0)
- * Club domestic league appearances and goals

Fanny Alicé Tess Lång (born 11 September 1996) is a Swedish footballer who plays as a defender for Stabæk. Lång previously played for AIK.
