= Camillo Vaz =

French football manager

Personal information
- Date of birth: 26 September 1975 (age 51)
- Place of birth: Suresnes, Hauts-de-Seine, France

Youth career
- Years: Team
- Racing Club de France

Managerial career
- 2009–2012: Paris Saint-Germain Féminine
- 2021–2022: GPSO 92 Issy

Camillo Vaz (born 26 September 1975) is a French football coach who was most recently the manager of Division 2 Féminine side GPSO 92 Issy from 2021 to 2022. From 2009 to 2012, he was the manager of Paris Saint-Germain Féminine.

== Personal life ==
Vaz is from Suresnes, Hauts-de-Seine, France. He is of Portuguese origin, and is married, with two children. As a youngster, Vaz played football for Racing Club de France. He has also worked as a sports teacher.

== Career ==
From 2009 to 2012, Vaz managed Paris Saint-Germain Féminine. During that time, PSG won the 2009–10 Challenge de France, after beating Montpellier HSC 5–0 in the final. PSG also came second in the 2010–11 Division 1 Féminine, finishing behind Olympique Lyonnais Féminin. PSG qualified for the 2011–12 UEFA Women's Champions League, the first time in their history that they had qualified for the tournament. They reached the round of 16 before being eliminated by Eintracht Frankfurt. Whilst Vaz was manager of PSG, the club was taken over by Qatar Sports Investments. Vaz signed Brazilian footballer Kátia Cilene Teixeira from Division 1 Féminine champions Lyon. Vaz was supportive of more women managing Division 1 Féminine clubs; in the 2011–12 season, only three of the 12 Division 1 Féminine teams were managed by women. Vaz left PSG in 2012, after the club failed to qualify for the 2012–13 UEFA Women's Champions League, and were knocked out in the semi-finals of the 2011–12 Coupe de France Féminine. He was replaced by Farid Benstiti, who had been managing the Russia women's national football team.

In 2014, Vaz released a book Football Féminin about his experience of coaching women's football teams. He later worked as a coach at Sciences Po in Paris.

In February 2021, Vaz was announced as the manager of Division 1 Féminine side GPSO 92 Issy, replacing Yacine Guesmia. Vaz had to deal with players' discontent at the dismissal of Yacine Guesmia after five years in charge, and general unhappiness with the club's management. Many players boycotted Vaz's first training session in protest; some players considered refusing to play in GPSO 92 Issy's next match, but all players then agreed to play. His first match in charge of GPSO 92 Issy was against PSG. Issy were 11th out of 12 teams in Division 1 Féminine when Vaz arrived. Issy were initially relegated to Division 2 Féminine at the end of the 2020–21 season, but the French Football Federation later reprieved Issy, meaning that they would compete in the 2021–22 Division 1 Féminine. Issy were relegated to Division 2 Féminine for the 2022–2023 season, and Vaz left the team in July 2022.
