= Sunniva Skoglund =

Norwegian football player (born 2002)

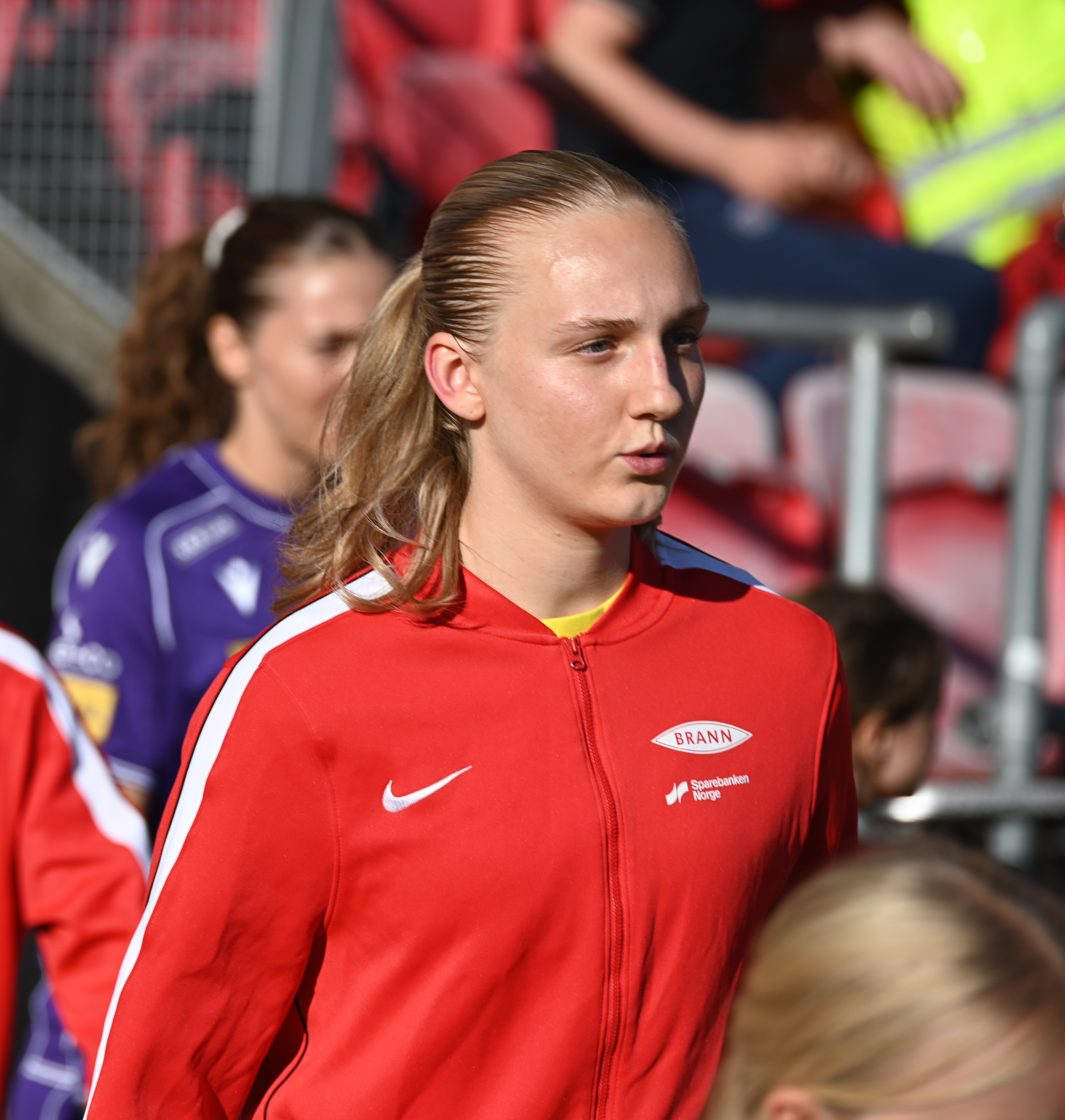

Personal information
- Date of birth: 22 May 2002 (age 24)
- Place of birth: Porsgrunn, Norway
- Position: Goalkeeper

Team information
- Current team: SK Brann
- Number: 1

Youth career
- Eidanger

Senior career*
Years	Team	Apps	(Gls)
2017–2018	Urædd	13	(0)
2017	→ Nanset (loan)	9	(0)
2019	Snøgg	21	(0)
2020–2026	Stabæk	123	(0)
2026–	SK Brann	0	(0)

International career^{‡}
2017	Norway U15	1	(0)
2018	Norway U16	6	(0)
2020	Norway U18	1	(0)
2019	Norway U19	2	(0)
2021–	Norway U23	10	(0)
2022–	Norway	2	(0)
- * Club domestic league appearances and goals as of 6 September 2025 ‡ National team caps and goals as of 7 April 2025

Sunniva Skoglund (born 22 May 2002) is a Norwegian professional footballer who plays as a goalkeeper for SK Brann and the Norway national team. She was part of the team that represented Norway at the UEFA Women's Euro 2022.

== Club career ==
Already at the age of 16, she stood out as a good goalkeeper for Urædd in the First Division. Before the 2019 season she changed club to Snøgg where she kept playing almost every match in first division.

In December 2019, it got official that she just had signed for Stabæk, which was just relegated from Toppserien to the First Division. She then became the successor to the keeper legend Ingrid Hjelmseth who retired after the 2019 season. Skoglund was a part when Stabæk got promoted back to Toppserien, and she had her debut in that league in May 2021.

== International career ==
Skoglund has played matches for the U15, U16, U18, U19 and U23 Norwegian national football teams. In February 2022, she was picked for the first time for the Norwegian national team to be part of the team that participated in Algarve Cup. She was also selected in March 2022 to be part of the team for the qualification for the next World Cup.

She was called up to represent Norway in the Euro 2022 as one of three goalkeepers, and as the youngest player on the team. She made her debut in October 2022, in a private international match against Brazil at Ullevaal Stadion, where she was voted best on the field.
