= Emilie Østerås =

Norwegian footballer (born 2002)

Emilie Libakken Østerås
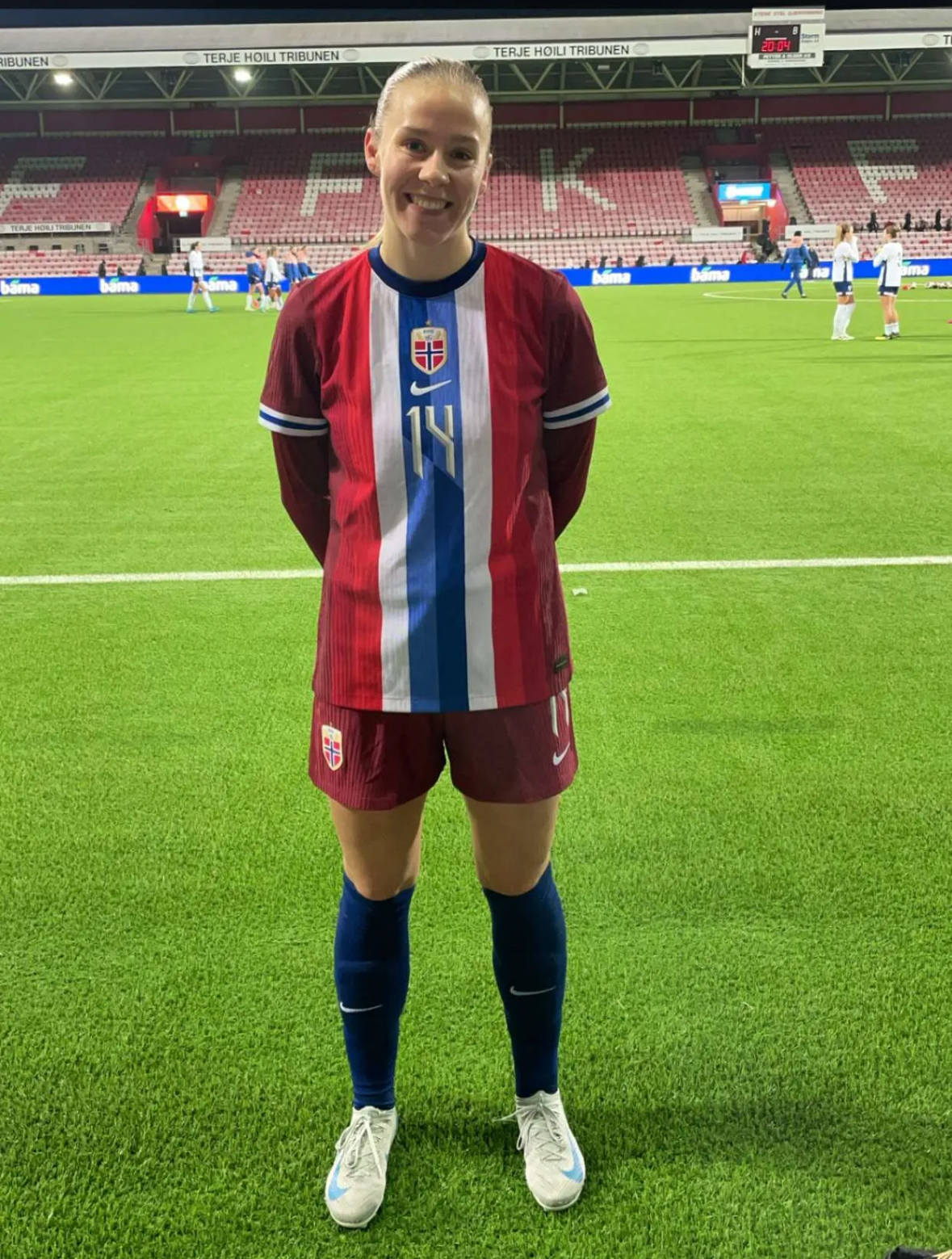
- Østerås with Norway U23 in November 2024

Personal information
- Full name: Emilie Libakken Østerås
- Date of birth: 27 March 2002 (age 24)
- Place of birth: Norway
- Position: Midfielder

Team information
- Current team: Paris Saint-Germain
- Number: 30

Youth career
- Vålerenga

Senior career*
Years	Team	Apps	(Gls)
2017–2021	Vålerenga	15	(2)
2021	→ Kolbotn (loan)	11	(0)
2022–2023	Kolbotn	27	(2)
2024–2025	Stabæk	51	(9)
2026	AIK	5	(0)
2026–	Paris Saint-Germain	0	(0)

International career^{‡}
2017	Norway U15	3	(1)
2018	Norway U16	7	(1)
2019	Norway U19	4	(0)
2024–2026	Norway U23	12	(2)
- * Club domestic league appearances and goals as of 15 August 2026 ‡ National team caps and goals as of 17 April 2026

Emilie Libakken Østerås (born 27 March 2002) is a Norwegian professional footballer who plays as a midfielder for Première Ligue club Paris Saint-Germain.

== Early life ==
Growing up, she attended Skøyenåsen skole in Norway. After that, she attended Valle Hovin videregående skole in Norway.

== Club career ==
As a youth player, Østerås joined the youth academy of Vålerenga at the age of ten and was promoted to the club's senior team in 2017, where she made fifteen league appearances and scored two goals. In 2021, she made eleven league appearances on loan at Kolbotn.

One year later, she returned to Kolbotn, where she made twenty-seven league appearances and scored two goals and helped the club achieve promotion from the second tier to the top flight.

Following her stint there, she signed for Stabæk in 2024, where she made fifty-one league appearances and scored nine goals. Ahead of the 2026 Damallsvenskan season, she signed for Swedish side AIK, where she was limited to five league appearances due to injuries. During the summer of 2026, she signed for French side PSG.

== International career ==
Østerås is a Norway youth international and has represented the country internationally at under-15, under-16, under-19, and under-23 levels.

Altogether, she made four appearances and scored zero goals while playing for the Norway women's national under-19 football team and made twelve appearances and scored two goals while playing for the Norway women's national under-23 football team.

== Style of play ==
Østerås plays as a midfielder. Swedish newspaper Expressen wrote in 2026 that she "was described as a strong and versatile midfielder, skilled in both defensive and offensive play".
