= Paris Saint-Germain FC (women) =

Women's department of Paris Saint-Germain

Paris Saint-Germain women's
- Full name: Paris Saint-Germain Football Club
- Nicknames: Les Parisiennes (The Parisians); Les Rouge-et-Bleu (The Red and Blues)
- Short name: PSG, Paris, Paris SG
- Founded: 1971; 55 years ago
- Ground: Campus PSG
- Capacity: 1,100
- President: Nasser Al-Khelaifi
- Coach: Paulo César
- League: Première Ligue
- 2025–26: Première Ligue, 3rd of 12
- Website: psg.fr/football-feminin
Home colours	Away colours

Paris Saint-Germain Football Club, commonly referred to as Paris Saint-Germain, PSG, Paris, or Paris SG, are a French professional women's football club based in Paris, France. It operates as the women's football department of Paris Saint-Germain FC. Founded in 1971, the club competes in the Première Ligue, the top tier of women's football in France, and plays its home matches at Campus PSG. PSG have been a top-flight club since 2001, when they won the Seconde Ligue title and secured promotion.

PSG spent its early decades moving between divisions before stabilising in the top flight. Their first major success came with victory in the Coupe de France Féminine in 2010, marking a turning point in the club's development. Following the takeover by Qatar Sports Investments (QSI) in 2012, PSG significantly increased investment in the women's team, professionalizing the squad and establishing themselves as one of the leading clubs in French women's football.

The club progressed from a mid-table side to one of the strongest teams in European women's football. PSG won their first Première Ligue title in 2021, ending OL Lyonnes' prolonged domestic dominance, and have since added further Coupe de France Féminine titles in 2018, 2022, and 2024. The team has also enjoyed consistent participation in the UEFA Women's Champions League, reaching the final on two occasions, and contests prominent rivalries with Lyon—often referred to as Le Classique—as well as the Paris derby against Paris FC.

Off the pitch, PSG's women's team has undergone several venue changes, moving from historic grounds such as Stade Georges Lefèvre to Campus PSG, while continuing to use larger stadiums, including the Parc des Princes for high-profile fixtures. The club continues to develop its sporting infrastructure and squad as it competes at both domestic and European levels.

== History ==
=== Foundation and rise to the top flight ===
A year after the foundation of the club, Paris Saint-Germain created their women's section in the summer of 1971 after the French Football Federation (FFF) gave the green light to female football. PSG signed 33 women for the 1971–72 season and the newly formed team began life in the Ligue de Paris, the lowest level of the football pyramid. They finished second that campaign, their best result ever, and continued life in the Parisian championship for seven more years, albeit with less success.

Ahead of the 1979–80 season, PSG were promoted to the top flight of French football, the Première Ligue, after it went from 20 to 48 teams. Their inaugural stint, however, only lasted three seasons, and PSG were relegated back to Seconde Ligue in 1982. The Red and Blues bounced between the two top divisions over the next 19 years. Following a dramatic 1999–2000 season in which they missed promotion to the elite by losing their last match against promotion contenders Schiltigheim, PSG finally steadied the ship in 2001. Led by coach Sébastien Thierry and young defender Laura Georges, the team won 16 out of 18 games played in Group A to claim back their place amongst the best in France. PSG would then clinch the 2000–01 Seconde Ligue title by defeating Group C leader Tours in the final. Since then, Paris SG have never been relegated from the Première Ligue.

=== From mid-table team to first major title ===
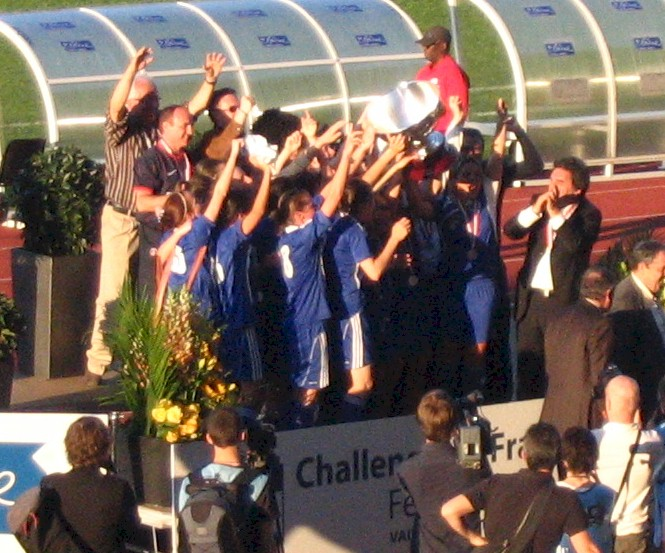
PSG won the Coupe de France Féminine in 2010.

Under incoming manager Cyril Combettes, Paris Saint-Germain remained without major problems in the Première Ligue but nowhere near the top teams. In the summer of 2005, starlets Sabrina Delannoy and Laure Boulleau signed from CNFE Clairefontaine. Together, they played more than 400 matches with PSG, being their two most capped players. The defending duo experienced everything with the capital side: relegation battles, mid-table finishes, title races and the club's first major trophy. Men and women combined, Delannoy is PSG's sixth most capped player ever, only behind male counterparts Jean-Marc Pilorget, Sylvain Armand, Safet Sušić, Paul Le Guen, and Marco Verratti.

At the end of March 2007, Cyril Combettes resigned due to relationship problems with the players. He was replaced by Eric Leroy for the 2007–08 season. Despite a difficult start, including a heavy defeat to Montpellier in the first match, the season was a success. Under Leroy's direction, the team finished in fifth place and reached their maiden Challenge de France final. Having crashed out at the same stage in 2005, the Red and Blues learned their lesson and defeated Parisian Derby rivals Paris FC (at the time called Juvisy) in the semi-finals. OL Lyonnes, however, proved too strong for PSG in the title-decider at the Stade de France, easily taking home the cup with three unanswered strikes.

Following a disappointing 2008–09 season, Camillo Vaz replaced Éric Leroy in June 2009. PSG recruited French internationals Élise Bussaglia, Julie Soyer, and Jessica Houara during that summer. The women's team then celebrated their 38th birthday by making their debut at the Parc des Princes. Usually reserved for the men's side, PSG hosted city rivals Paris FC at the stadium on October 18, 2009. In front of 5,892 spectators, they defeated their guests thanks to an early goal from Camille Abily. The 2009–10 campaign ended with a third place, a first for them on the podium. Better yet, the Parisians also reached their second Challenge de France final after eliminating juggernauts Lyon in the semi-finals.

Noilhan had left the club shortly before the final, leaving Vaz as the sole coach. This, however, did not stop PSG from crushing defending champions Montpellier at the Stade Robert Bobin to claim their first major title as well as their second trophy ever and their first since 2001. Emblematic club striker Ingrid Boyeldieu, who would retire at the end of the season, opened the scoring in the first half. After the break, PSG added four more goals for a brutal 5–0 scoreline, the largest victory in the history of cup finals.

=== European debut and Qatari takeover ===
The 2010–11 season marked a turning point for Paris. In the summer, Brazilian star Kátia joined on a free signing from Lyon. PSG finished league runners-up behind heavyweights OL Lyonnes and qualified to the UEFA Women's Champions League for the first time in their history. The Parisians dramatically defeated second-placed Montpellier in the final game of the season, with team captain Sabrina Delannoy scoring the winning penalty in stoppage time. Élise Bussaglia was named Première Ligue Féminine Player of the Season.

Exempted from the group stage, PSG made their European debut by comfortably eliminating Irish side Peamount in the Round of 16, before being themselves ousted by German giants and future finalists 1. FFC Frankfurt. The rest of the 2011–12 campaign, however, was not as successful. Undermined by the injuries of key players Léa Rubio, Laure Lepailleur, and Caroline Pizzala, the team lost its grip and finished in fourth place after suffering a heavy defeat at home to Île-de-France rivals Paris FC. As a result, coach Camillo Vaz left the club at the end of the season.

PSG bounced back immediately with the professionalisation of the team by new club owners Qatar Sports Investments (QSI) ahead of the 2012–13 campaign. They spent big to build a team capable of competing with the best clubs in France and Europe, including Lyon, and signed its 21 players to a federal contract, something unprecedented in women's football. Renowned international players Shirley Cruz, Kosovare Asllani, Annike Krahn, and Linda Bresonik were the first to arrive, as well as Farid Benstiti, the coach who guided Lyon to four consecutive league titles. A season later, PSG recruited Marie-Laure Delie, the first women's football transfer in France, for €50k. As part of this revolution, PSG also moved to the Stade Sébastien Charléty in 2012 and then to the Stade Jean-Bouin in 2018, abandoning the smaller Stade Georges Lefèvre, which had been their home stadium since 1971.

=== Lyon rivalry and second cup title ===
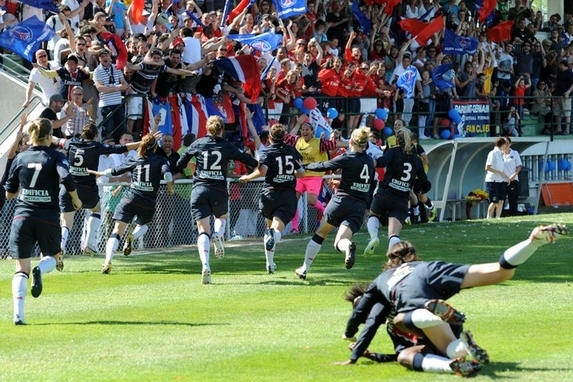
PSG celebrating their first qualification for the Champions League in 2011.

These investments allowed PSG to challenge OL Lyonnes, with the duo developing a heated rivalry dubbed as Le Classique. Lyon still kept a head start over Paris during the 2010s, clinching a record 14 consecutive league titles between 2007 and 2020. PSG managed a few important victories during that time, though. League and cup runners-up behind Lyon in 2013–14, they recorded their first ever win over the champions in January 2014, with a solitary goal from Laura Georges at the Stade de Gerland. It was Lyon's first league defeat at home since March 2010, an unbeaten streak spanning 87 matches.

PSG repeated the feat in 2014–15, this time in the Champions League, as Fatmire Alushi scored the only goal at Gerland to eliminate Lyon in the last 16. Nonetheless, the season ended in disappointment; Paris finished second to Lyon and lost the 2015 UEFA Women's Champions League final to Frankfurt at the last second. Lyon retaliated in 2015–16 by claiming the championship and then crushing PSG in the Champions League semi-finals. They scored seven times without response, inflicting PSG's biggest defeat in the continental competition and one of their biggest ever. Even worse, Paris finished third in the league and missed qualification to the Champions League. The club did not renew Farid Benstiti's contract and was replaced by Patrice Lair, another former Lyon coach.

The two sides were back at it again in 2016–17. PSG first beat their rivals, also by a 1–0 margin, in December 2016 despite Lyon still managing to retain the league title. Then, they crossed paths in the Coupe de France Féminine final, won by Lyon after an endless penalty shoot-out, and in the 2017 UEFA Women's Champions League final, which also had to be decided on penalties. The teams could not be separated after seven kicks each until PSG goalkeeper Katarzyna Kiedrzynek stepped up and missed. Her counterpart Sarah Bouhaddi converted her effort and handed Lyon the European victory. With Bernard Mendy on the bench, filling in after the surprise departure of Lair, the capital outfit exacted revenge on Lyon in the 2017–18 season by defeating them in the Coupe de France final in May 2018, with a solitary goal from French international striker Marie-Antoinette Katoto.

=== First league championship and decline ===
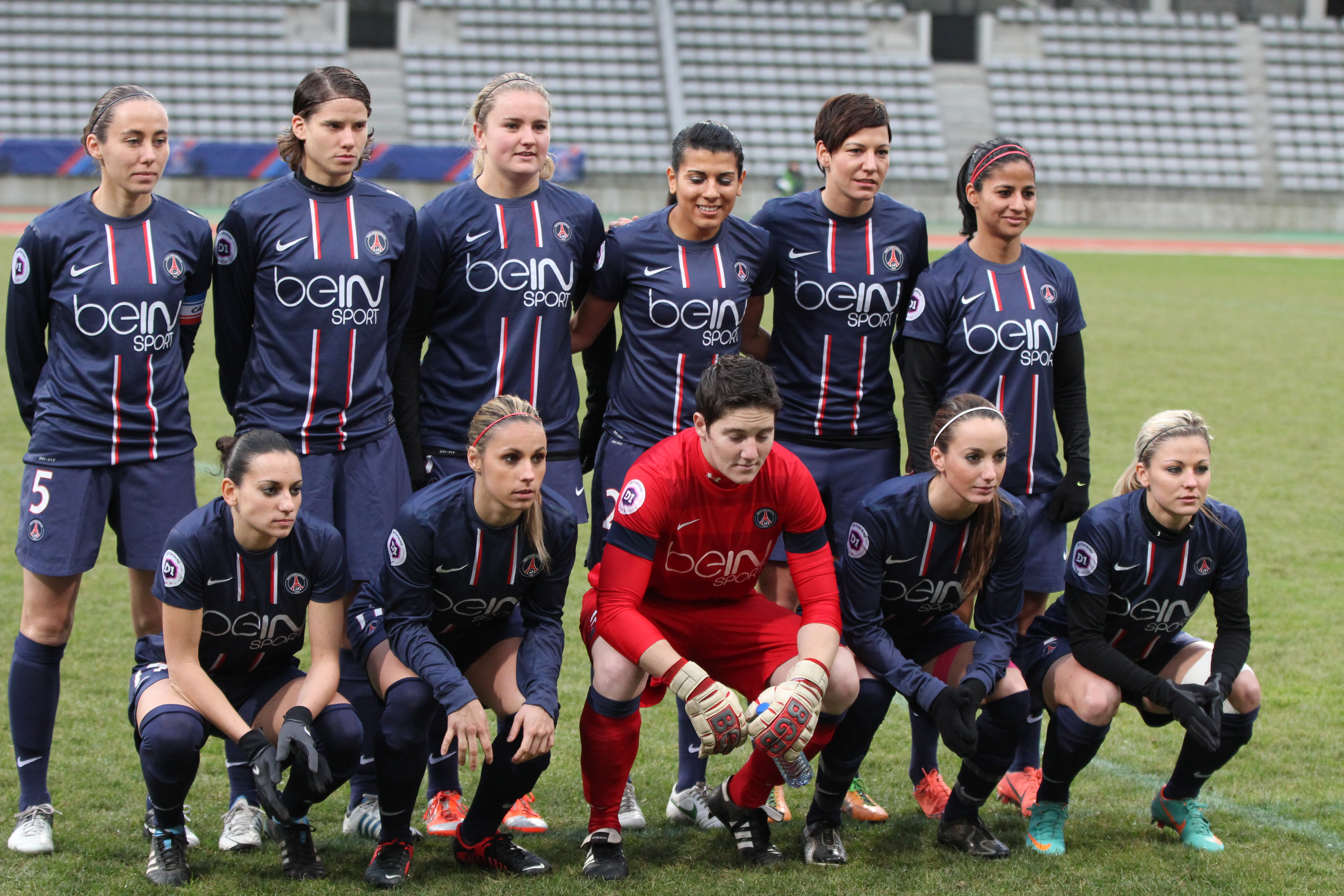
PSG ahead of their home league match against Paris FC in December 2012.

Olivier Echouafni was named manager in June 2018, while Mendy stayed on as his assistant. Paris finished league runners-up in 2018–19 and 2019–20, while losing the Coupe de France and Trophée des Championnes to Lyon as well. In Echouafni's third season in charge, PSG ended Lyon's 80-game unbeaten league streak in November 2020 to leapfrog them and go top of the table. Once more, Katoto scored the lone goal of a game played behind closed doors at the Parc des Princes.

PSG subsequently secured a crucial goalless draw away to Lyon before defeating Dijon on the final matchday to claim their first Première Ligue title, ending their rivals' run of 14 consecutive league championships. They also brought an end to Lyon's dominance in the UEFA Women's Champions League by staging a notable comeback to deny them a sixth consecutive European title, although PSG were later eliminated by Barcelona in the semifinals.

However, PSG subsequently struggled, reflecting years of transfer mismanagement and strategic inconsistency. The club's only notable successes were two additional Coupe de France titles, both achieved after eliminating Lyon, first with an 8–0 victory over second-tier Yzeure in 2022 and later with a 1–0 win against Fleury in the 2024 final, decided by a goal from Lieke Martens.

Despite a substantial budget, PSG allowed several core French players to leave for Lyon or abroad and failed to establish a coherent long-term sporting strategy. The club also experienced significant managerial instability, appointing a different manager each season since Olivier Echouafni's departure in 2021, including Didier Ollé-Nicolle (2021–22), Gérard Prêcheur (2022–23), Jocelyn Prêcheur (2023–24), Fabrice Abriel (2024–25), and Paulo César (2025–26), who launched a youth-focused project.

Under sporting director Angelo Castelazzi, recruitment remained inconsistent, with Sakina Karchaoui and Griedge Mbock Bathy among the few notable signings. Numerous leading French players—such as Marie-Antoinette Katoto, Kadidiatou Diani, Sandy Baltimore, Constance Picaud, and Grace Geyoro—alongside prominent foreign players including Christiane Endler, Lieke Martens, Tabitha Chawinga, Ashley Lawrence, and Sara Däbritz, departed in successive seasons. This period of stagnation, and at times regression, culminated in PSG's elimination from the 2025–26 UEFA Women's Champions League after finishing 17th out of 18 in the league phase, following a shock qualifying-round exit to Juventus the previous year. Domestically, PSG also fell behind Paris FC, who defeated them in the 2025 Coupe de France Féminine final.

== Grounds ==
=== Stadiums ===
Between 1971 and 2012, Paris Saint-Germain played their home matches at the Stade Georges Lefèvre, the main stadium of Camp des Loges, the club's training ground. PSG relocated to the Stade Sébastien Charléty in 2012, when the team turned professional. They returned to the Georges Lefèvre in 2017, before moving to the Stade Jean-Bouin in 2018. PSG continued to use the Georges Lefèvre whenever the Jean-Bouin wasn't available until January 2024, when they moved to Campus PSG, the club's new training facility in Poissy. The main stadium of Campus PSG, with a capacity of 1,100 spectators, is now their home ground as well, except for matches relocated to the Parc des Princes or Jean-Bouin. They played their first game at Campus PSG on January 9, 2024, cruising to a 6–0 win over Lille OSC in Première Ligue. This was also the very first official match played there.

Usually reserved for the men's side, the Parc des Princes serves as the women's home ground for big domestic and European matches. After 38 years of existence, PSG made their debut at the stadium in a league game against Parisian rivals Paris FC on October 18, 2009. Camille Abily scored the only goal of the match to hand PSG the win. Their European debut, and second game overall, came on March 28, 2015, against Glasgow City for the quarterfinals of the 2014–15 UEFA Women's Champions League. PSG won 5–0. Another big night at the arena was the club's 1–0 league victory – courtesy of Marie-Antoinette Katoto's lone goal – over arch-rivals OL Lyonnes in November 2020. PSG also broke the national home attendance record when they hosted Lyon at the Parc des Princes on April 30, 2022. The UEFA Champions League clash attracted 43,254 spectators, who saw the Parisians fell to a 1–2 defeat.

=== Training facilities ===
Campus PSG, located in Poissy, has been the club's training ground since January 2024. Camp des Loges was previously the club's training facility from 1971 until 2012, when it moved to Bougival. PSG briefly returned to Camp des Loges in June 2023, before definitely moving into Campus PSG. Owned and funded by the club, it houses the men's football team, the women's football team, and the football academy, as well as the handball and judo teams and their academies. Campus PSG will feature a stadium that will complement the club's stadium, the Parc des Princes, which will be built during the second phase of the project, after 2024. With a capacity of 5,000 spectators, including more than 3,000 seats, the stadium will host PSG's academy and women's team matches in the UEFA Youth League and the UEFA Women's Champions League.

== Records ==
=== Club ===
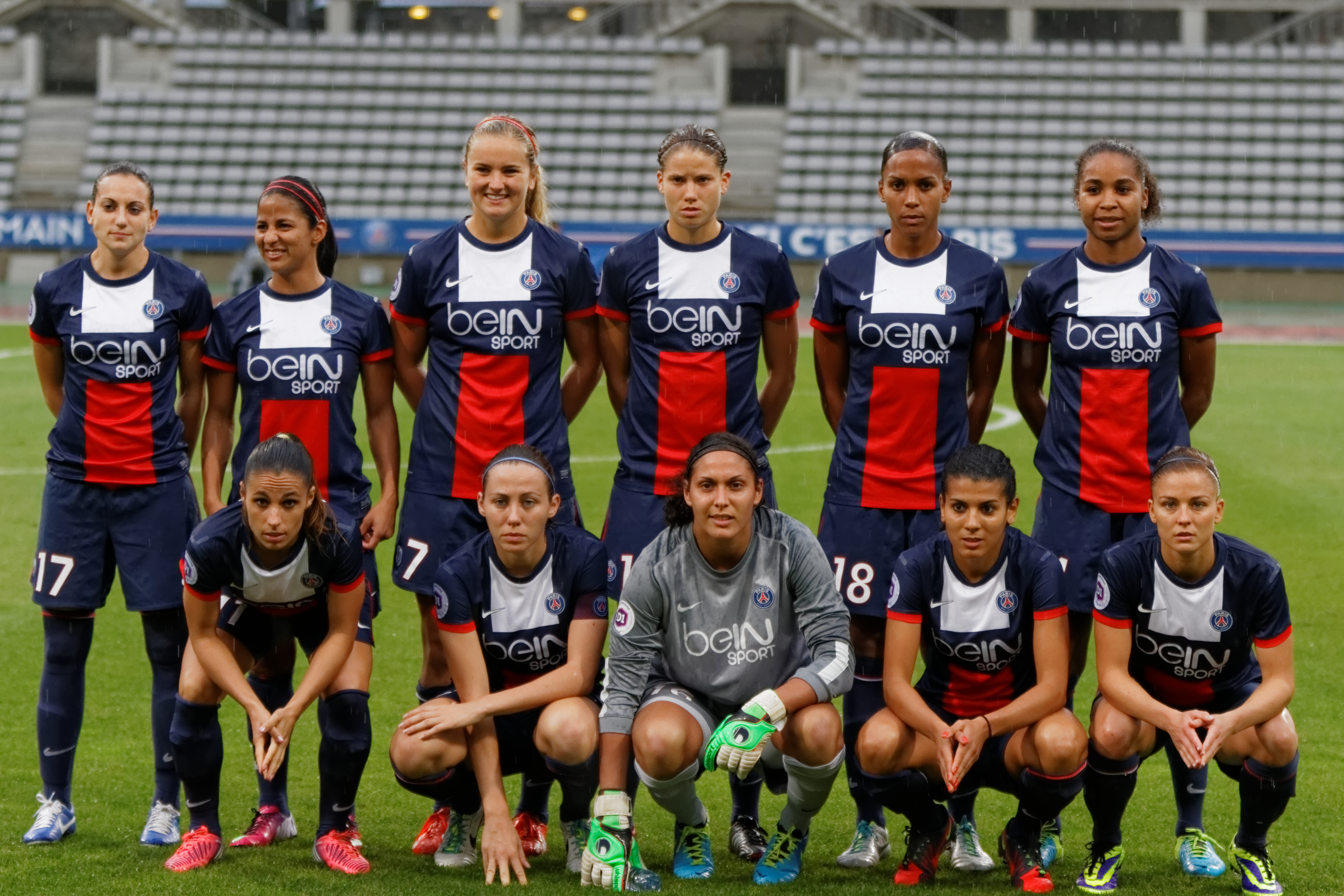
PSG at home to Lyon in 2013.

- All-time record win: 19–0 away to Bourges 18, Coupe de France Féminine, 8 January 2017.
- All-time record defeat: 1–9 away to Hénin-Beaumont, Première Ligue, 18 September 1994.
- Record win in Première Ligue: 14–0 away to Issy, 14 November 2020.
- Record defeat in Première Ligue: 0–7 home to Montpellier, 8 June 2008.
- Record win in Coupe de France Féminine: 19–0 away to Bourges 18, 8 January 2017.
- Record defeat in Coupe de France Féminine: 0–7 home to Paris FC, 5 May 2005.
- Record win in UEFA Women's Champions League: 9–0 home to Olimpia Cluj, 14 October 2015.
- Record defeat in UEFA Women's Champions League: 0–7 away to Lyon, 23 April 2016.
- Highest home attendance: 43,254 vs. Lyon, UEFA Women's Champions League, 30 April 2022 (National Record).
- First match at the Parc des Princes: 1–0 vs. Paris FC, Première Ligue, 18 October 2009.

=== Individual ===
- Most goals in a match: 7 – Nadia Nadim (vs. Issy, Première Ligue, 14 November 2020).
- Most goals in a season: 32 – Marie-Antoinette Katoto in 2021–22.
- Most expensive arrival: €150k – Jackie Groenen from Manchester United in 2022.
- Most expensive departure: €1.15m – Grace Geyoro to London City Lionesses in 2025.

== Statistics ==
=== Seasons ===
As of 2025–26 season.

From the 1979–80 season onwards.

List of seasons

Winners Runners-up Promoted Relegated

Season	League		CdF	CdL	TdC	UEFA		FIFA		MP	W	D	L	GF	GA	GD	WP%	Attendance	Top goalscorers																				
Season	1979–80	PL	CdF	CdL	TdC	UEFA		FIFA		MP	W	D	L	GF	GA	GD	WP%	Attendance	Top goalscorers		3rd	—N/a	—N/a	—N/a	—N/a	—N/a	—N/a	—N/a	14	8	2	4	40	11	+29	57.14	—N/a	—N/a	—N/a
1980–81	PL	3rd	—N/a	—N/a	—N/a	—N/a	—N/a	—N/a	—N/a	14	7	3	4	22	12	+10	50.00	—N/a	—N/a	—N/a																			
1981–82	PL	5th	—N/a	—N/a	—N/a	—N/a	—N/a	—N/a	—N/a	14	4	3	7	17	21	−4	28.57	—N/a	—N/a	—N/a																			
1982–83	SL	RU	—N/a	—N/a	—N/a	—N/a	—N/a	—N/a	—N/a	21	11	5	5	31	11	+20	52.38	—N/a	—N/a	—N/a																			
1983–84	SL	4th	—N/a	—N/a	—N/a	—N/a	—N/a	—N/a	—N/a	20	8	3	9	50	27	+23	40.00	—N/a	(France) Sabrina Meknassi	19																			
1984–85	SL	RU	—N/a	—N/a	—N/a	—N/a	—N/a	—N/a	—N/a	23	11	3	9	50	33	+17	47.83	—N/a	(France) Dana Denisse	22																			
1985–86	SL	3rd	—N/a	—N/a	—N/a	—N/a	—N/a	—N/a	—N/a	20	9	5	6	43	31	+12	45.00	—N/a	(France) Corinne Ernoult	15																			
1986–87	PL	3rd	—N/a	—N/a	—N/a	—N/a	—N/a	—N/a	—N/a	14	8	1	5	29	22	+7	57.14	—N/a	—N/a	—N/a																			
1987–88	PL	7th	—N/a	—N/a	—N/a	—N/a	—N/a	—N/a	—N/a	18	6	1	11	25	37	−12	33.33	—N/a	—N/a	—N/a																			
1988–89	PL	3rd	—N/a	—N/a	—N/a	—N/a	—N/a	—N/a	—N/a	18	10	2	6	33	29	+4	55.56	—N/a	—N/a	—N/a																			
1989–90	PL	7th	—N/a	—N/a	—N/a	—N/a	—N/a	—N/a	—N/a	18	7	4	7	27	24	+3	38.89	—N/a	—N/a	—N/a																			
1990–91	PL	5th	—N/a	—N/a	—N/a	—N/a	—N/a	—N/a	—N/a	18	7	6	5	28	27	+1	38.89	—N/a	—N/a	—N/a																			
1991–92	PL	5th	—N/a	—N/a	—N/a	—N/a	—N/a	—N/a	—N/a	18	9	4	5	36	20	+16	50.00	—N/a	(France) Patricia Chambonnet	14																			
1992–93	SL	5th	—N/a	—N/a	—N/a	—N/a	—N/a	—N/a	—N/a	18	8	3	7	20	19	+1	44.44	—N/a	—N/a	—N/a																			
1993–94	SL	3rd	—N/a	—N/a	—N/a	—N/a	—N/a	—N/a	—N/a	17	11	2	4	44	29	+15	64.71	—N/a	—N/a	—N/a																			
1994–95	PL	11th	—N/a	—N/a	—N/a	—N/a	—N/a	—N/a	—N/a	22	2	2	18	16	78	−62	9.09	—N/a	—N/a	—N/a																			
1995–96	SL	4th	—N/a	—N/a	—N/a	—N/a	—N/a	—N/a	—N/a	18	9	3	6	34	31	+3	50.00	—N/a	—N/a	—N/a																			
1996–97	SL	7th	—N/a	—N/a	—N/a	—N/a	—N/a	—N/a	—N/a	4	0	1	3	5	19	−14	0.00	—N/a	—N/a	—N/a																			
1997–98	SL	5th	—N/a	—N/a	—N/a	—N/a	—N/a	—N/a	—N/a	4	2	1	1	11	9	+2	50.00	—N/a	—N/a	—N/a																			
1998–99	SL	3rd	—N/a	—N/a	—N/a	—N/a	—N/a	—N/a	—N/a	18	11	2	5	48	20	+28	61.11	—N/a	—N/a	—N/a																			
1999–00	SL	2nd	—N/a	—N/a	—N/a	—N/a	—N/a	—N/a	—N/a	18	14	1	3	49	13	+36	77.78	—N/a	—N/a	—N/a																			
2000–01	SL	1st	—N/a	—N/a	—N/a	—N/a	—N/a	—N/a	—N/a	20	18	0	2	83	11	+72	90.00	—N/a	—N/a	—N/a																			
2001–02	PL	6th	QF	—N/a	—N/a	—N/a	—N/a	—N/a	—N/a	25	12	6	7	45	34	+11	48.00	—N/a	(France) Ingrid Boyeldieu	17																			
2002–03	PL	7th	R16	—N/a	—N/a	—N/a	—N/a	—N/a	—N/a	24	7	8	9	36	51	−15	29.17	—N/a	(France) Ingrid Boyeldieu	13																			
2003–04	PL	8th	QF	—N/a	—N/a	—N/a	—N/a	—N/a	—N/a	25	7	8	10	27	37	−10	28.00	—N/a	(France) Ingrid Boyeldieu	5																			
2004–05	PL	10th	SF	—N/a	—N/a	—N/a	—N/a	—N/a	—N/a	26	6	5	15	36	59	−23	23.08	—N/a	(France) Ingrid Boyeldieu	12																			
2005–06	PL	8th	R16	—N/a	—N/a	—N/a	—N/a	—N/a	—N/a	24	9	4	11	32	37	−5	37.50	—N/a	(France) Sarah Hamraoui	5																			
2006–07	PL	7th	R32	—N/a	—N/a	—N/a	—N/a	—N/a	—N/a	23	6	8	9	38	37	+1	26.09	—N/a	(France) Aurélie Mula	9																			
2007–08	PL	5th	RU	—N/a	—N/a	—N/a	—N/a	—N/a	—N/a	27	13	4	10	36	39	−3	48.15	—N/a	(France) Marie-Laure Delie	21																			
2008–09	PL	8th	R32	—N/a	—N/a	—N/a	—N/a	—N/a	—N/a	23	7	7	9	30	31	−1	30.43	—N/a	(France) Candice Prévost	7																			
2009–10	PL	3rd	W	—N/a	—N/a	—N/a	—N/a	—N/a	—N/a	27	19	6	2	74	12	+62	70.37	—N/a	(France) Camille Abily	12																			
2010–11	PL	2nd	R32	—N/a	—N/a	—N/a	—N/a	—N/a	—N/a	24	18	1	5	53	17	+36	75.00	—N/a	(Brazil) Kátia	12																			
2011–12	PL	4th	SF	—N/a	—N/a	UWCL	R16	—N/a	—N/a	31	19	6	6	77	28	+49	61.29	—N/a	(France) Kenza Dali	13																			
2012–13	PL	2nd	SF	—N/a	—N/a	—N/a	—N/a	—N/a	—N/a	27	22	2	3	94	12	+82	81.48	—N/a	(Sweden) Kosovare Asllani	22																			
2013–14	PL	2nd	RU	—N/a	—N/a	UWCL	R32	—N/a	—N/a	29	22	3	4	104	14	+90	75.86	—N/a	(France) Marie-Laure Delie	30																			
2014–15	PL	2nd	R16	—N/a	—N/a	UWCL	RU	—N/a	—N/a	34	27	3	4	111	16	+95	79.41	—N/a	(France) Marie-Laure Delie	20																			
2015–16	PL	2nd	SF	—N/a	—N/a	UWCL	SF	—N/a	—N/a	35	25	7	3	108	24	+84	71.43	—N/a	(Brazil) Cristiane	23																			
2016–17	PL	3rd	RU	—N/a	—N/a	UWCL	RU	—N/a	—N/a	37	26	5	6	116	26	+90	70.27	—N/a	(France) Marie-Laure Delie	28																			
2017–18	PL	2nd	W	—N/a	—N/a	—N/a	—N/a	—N/a	—N/a	28	24	2	2	74	14	+60	85.71	—N/a	(France) Marie-Antoinette Katoto	26																			
2018–19	PL	2nd	QF	—N/a	—N/a	UWCL	QF	—N/a	—N/a	31	25	3	3	84	23	+61	80.65	—N/a	(France) Marie-Antoinette Katoto	30																			
2019–20	PL	2nd	RU	—N/a	RU	UWCL	SF	—N/a	—N/a	28	21	5	2	97	13	+84	75.00	—N/a	(France) Marie-Antoinette Katoto	24																			
2020–21	PL	1st	R32	—N/a	—N/a	UWCL	SF	—N/a	—N/a	31	25	3	3	102	13	+89	80.65	—N/a	(France) Marie-Antoinette Katoto	25																			
2021–22	PL	2nd	W	—N/a	—N/a	UWCL	SF	—N/a	—N/a	37	28	4	5	118	23	+95	75.68	—N/a	(France) Marie-Antoinette Katoto	32																			
2022–23	PL	2nd	RU	—N/a	RU	UWCL	QF	—N/a	—N/a	38	25	7	6	68	24	+44	65.79	—N/a	(France) Kadidiatou Diani	26																			
2023–24	PL	RU	W	—N/a	RU	UWCL	SF	—N/a	—N/a	42	25	9	8	106	43	+63	59.52	—N/a	(Malawi) Tabitha Chawinga	29																			
2024–25	PL	RU	RU	—N/a	—N/a	UWCL	R2	—N/a	—N/a	31	21	5	5	77	24	+53	67.74	—N/a	(Netherlands) Romée Leuchter	14																			
2025–26	PL	3rd	RU	RU	—N/a	UWCL	LP	—N/a	—N/a	36	21	4	11	70	45	+25	58.33	—N/a	(Netherlands) Romée Leuchter	23																			
2026–27	PL	TBD	TBD	TBD	—N/a	UWCL	TBD	—N/a	—N/a	0	0	0	0	0	0	+0	—	—N/a	TBD	TBD																			

=== Competitive record ===
As of 21 November 2026.

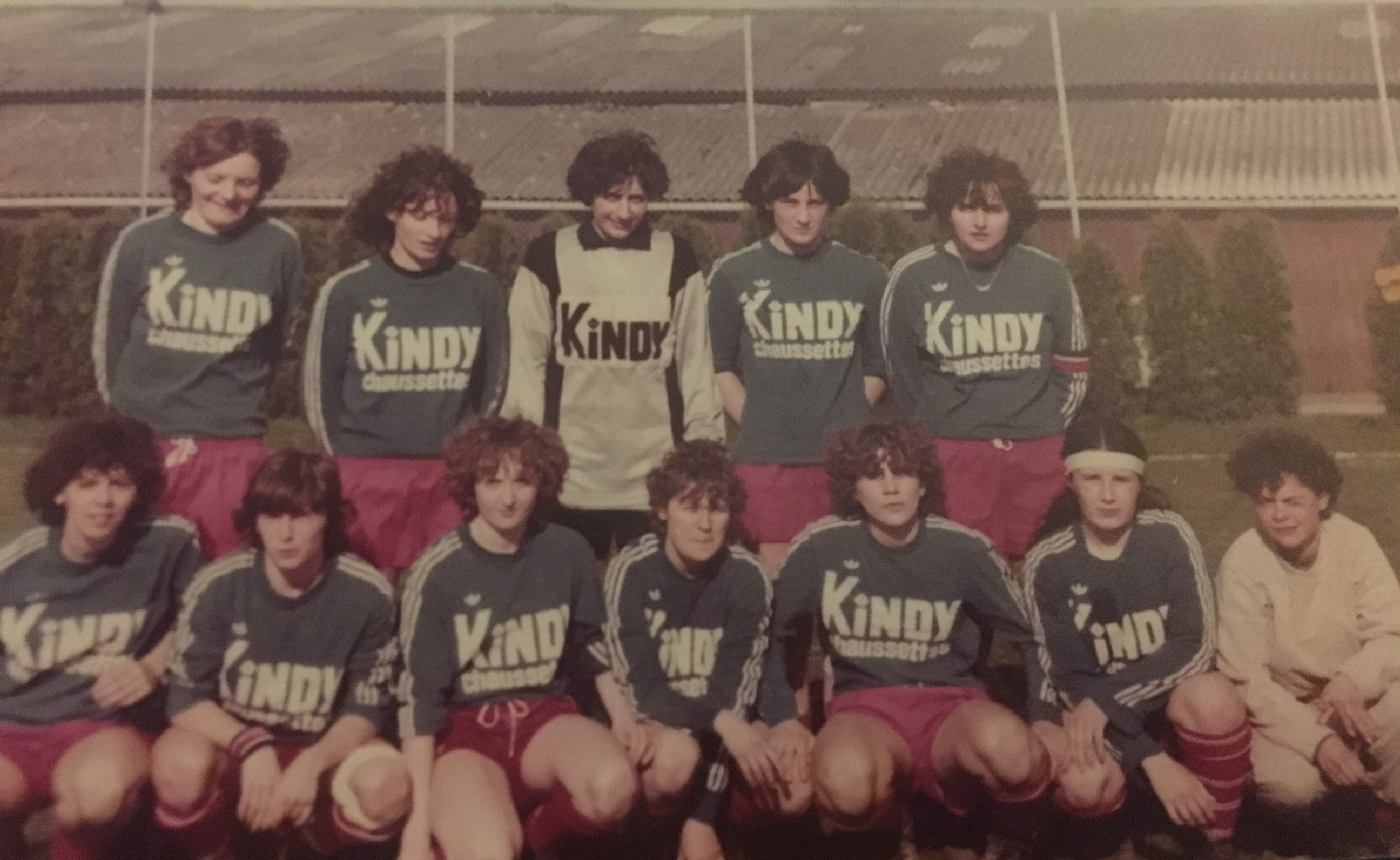
PSG's starting lineup in June 1988.

Competition	MP	W	D	L	GF	GA	GD	WP%
League
Première Ligue	727	417	121	189	1,605	809	+796	57.36
Seconde Ligue	201	112	29	60	468	253	+215	55.72
National cups
Coupe de France Féminine	97	68	17	12	307	75	+232	70.10
Coupe LFFP	3	2	0	1	6	1	+5	66.67
Trophée des Championnes	3	0	1	2	1	4	−3	0.00
International cups
UEFA Women's Champions League	100	51	19	30	195	91	+104	51.00
Total	1,131	650	187	294	2,582	1,233	+1349	57.47

== Supporters ==
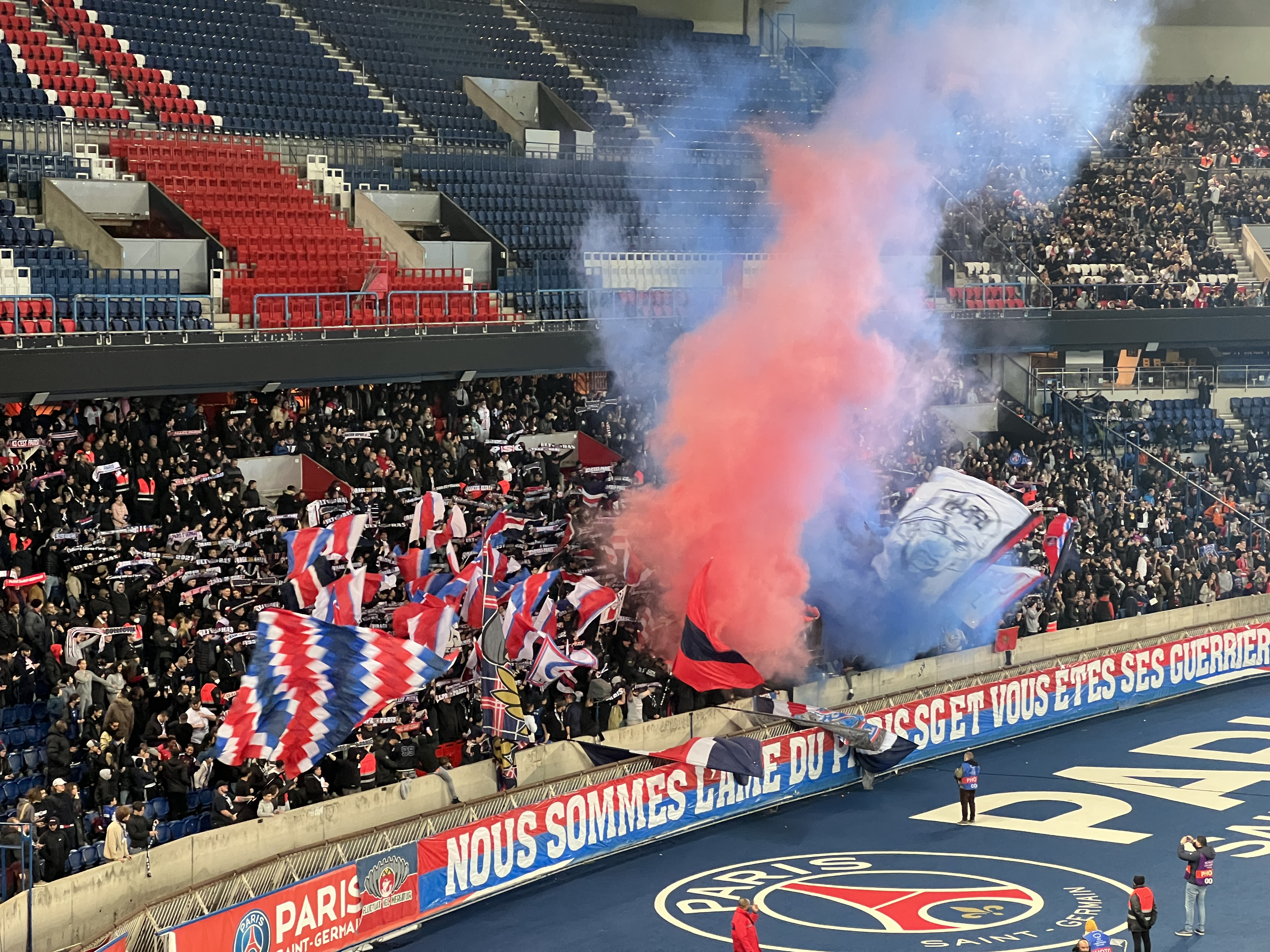
The CUP versus the women's team of Bayern Munich in March 2022.

Between 2010 and 2016, unable to support the men's team, the ultras focused on other PSG teams and they began attending their games, especially the women's team, but also the youth and handball teams. Unlike some fans who decided to cheer on other Parisian clubs such as Paris FC or Créteil, the ultras noticed that there was not much enthusiasm surrounding the women and decided to stick with PSG, supporting them in France and abroad, from league clashes against rivals OL Lyonnes to the 2014–15 UEFA Women's Champions League (UWCL) semi-finals against Wolfsburg and the 2015 final in Berlin, where they lost to Eintracht Frankfurt.

A marriage of convenience at first, the ultras began to greatly enjoy supporting the women for three main reasons: their proximity compared to the men, allowing them to easily approach the players; their appreciation for the fans, always thanking them after each match; and their solidarity with the ultra movement, publicly supporting the return to the Parc des Princes for the men's team's matches in interviews and on social media, in contrast to the male players, whose communication was more controlled by the club. The ultras have continued to support the women's side since their return to the stadium in May 2016; they were at the Parc for the 2016–17 UEFA Women's Champions League matches against Bayern Munich and Barcelona. 300 ultras travelled to Cardiff to cheer on the team in the 2017 final.

Despite their protests against the management and the attitude of male players in 2022, the CUP were still behind the "exemplary" women's team. They went en masse to the Parc des Princes for the 2021–22 UEFA Women's Champions League quarterfinals against Bayern Munich in March, and then for the semifinals versus OL Lyonnes in April. In the latter match, the ultras were part of the club record 43,254 spectators in attendance. Before kick-off, they unfurled a banner reading: "Proud of our colors and proud of our female players."

Among the women's team's fan favorites are Sabrina Delannoy, Grace Geyoro and Laure Boulleau, all of whom have set appearance records; the club's all-time top scorers, Marie-Antoinette Katoto, Marie-Laure Delie and Kadidiatou Diani; PSG Academy alumna Sandy Baltimore; and Polish goalkeeper Katarzyna Kiedrzynek. The ultras forged a particularly strong relationship with the latter. When Kiedrzynek left PSG in 2020 after seven years, they unfurled two huge banners reading: "Thank you, Kasia. Our home will always be open for you."

== Rivalries ==
=== Le Classique ===
Le Classique (women), also referred to as Le Classico, is a French football rivalry contested between PSG and OL Lyonnes (Lyon), the two most successful clubs in French women's football. First played in 1994, the fixture has grown in prominence to become one of the marquee matchups in the Première Ligue, France's top women's league. Over the years, the rivalry has featured closely contested league games, cup finals, and European encounters, drawing increased attention as both clubs have competed for national and continental honours.

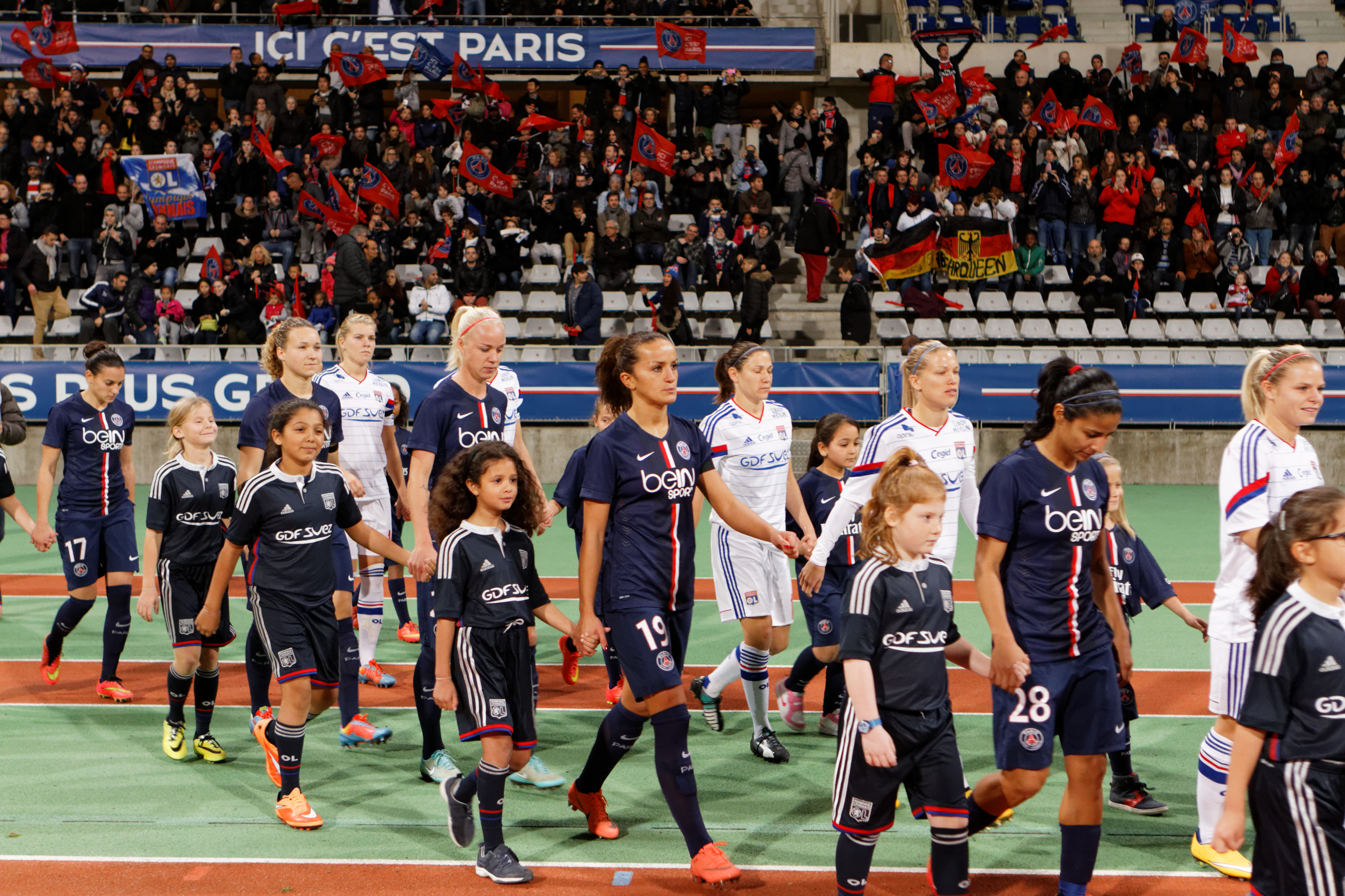
Players of PSG and Lyon walk onto the pitch ahead of their 2014 encounter.

By the end of the 2000s, Lyon had established overwhelming dominance in French and European women's football. PSG gradually emerged as a credible challenger in the 2010s following its acquisition by Qatar Sports Investments (QSI) in 2012. From the mid-2010s onward, the two sides regularly finished in the top two positions of the Première Ligue and faced each other repeatedly in the Coupe de France Féminine and the UEFA Women's Champions League. Although Lyon largely maintained the upper hand, PSG recorded notable milestones, including their first league victory over Lyon in 2014 and a landmark European success in 2015. Intense competition for elite players in the transfer market has further heightened tensions between two of the best-resourced clubs in women's football.

Public interest in the fixture grew steadily, leading it to be widely known as the women's Le Classique or Le Classico. A key turning point occurred in 2018, when PSG won their first trophy against Lyon by lifting the Coupe de France, symbolizing a narrowing of the competitive gap despite Lyon's continued domestic and European dominance. The rivalry intensified through a series of high-profile encounters in the 2020s, notably PSG ending Lyon's 80-match unbeaten league run and securing their first Première Ligue title in 2021. Lyon, however, retained the upper hand in decisive Champions League knockout ties and domestic finals between 2022 and 2026.

The women's rivalry mirrors the prominence of the men's Le Classique, contested between Paris Saint-Germain FC (PSG) and Olympique de Marseille (OM), which is regarded as the biggest fixture in French men's football. PSG and OM are the two most successful clubs in France and widely supported clubs in France. The rivalry emerged in the 1980s following PSG's first league title and OM's ascent under Bernard Tapie, as sustained competition for titles and a series of off-field controversies intensified tensions. Media involvement and increased financial backing in the 1990s further amplified the antagonism, which has endured despite fluctuating periods of sporting success for both clubs.

=== Paris derby ===
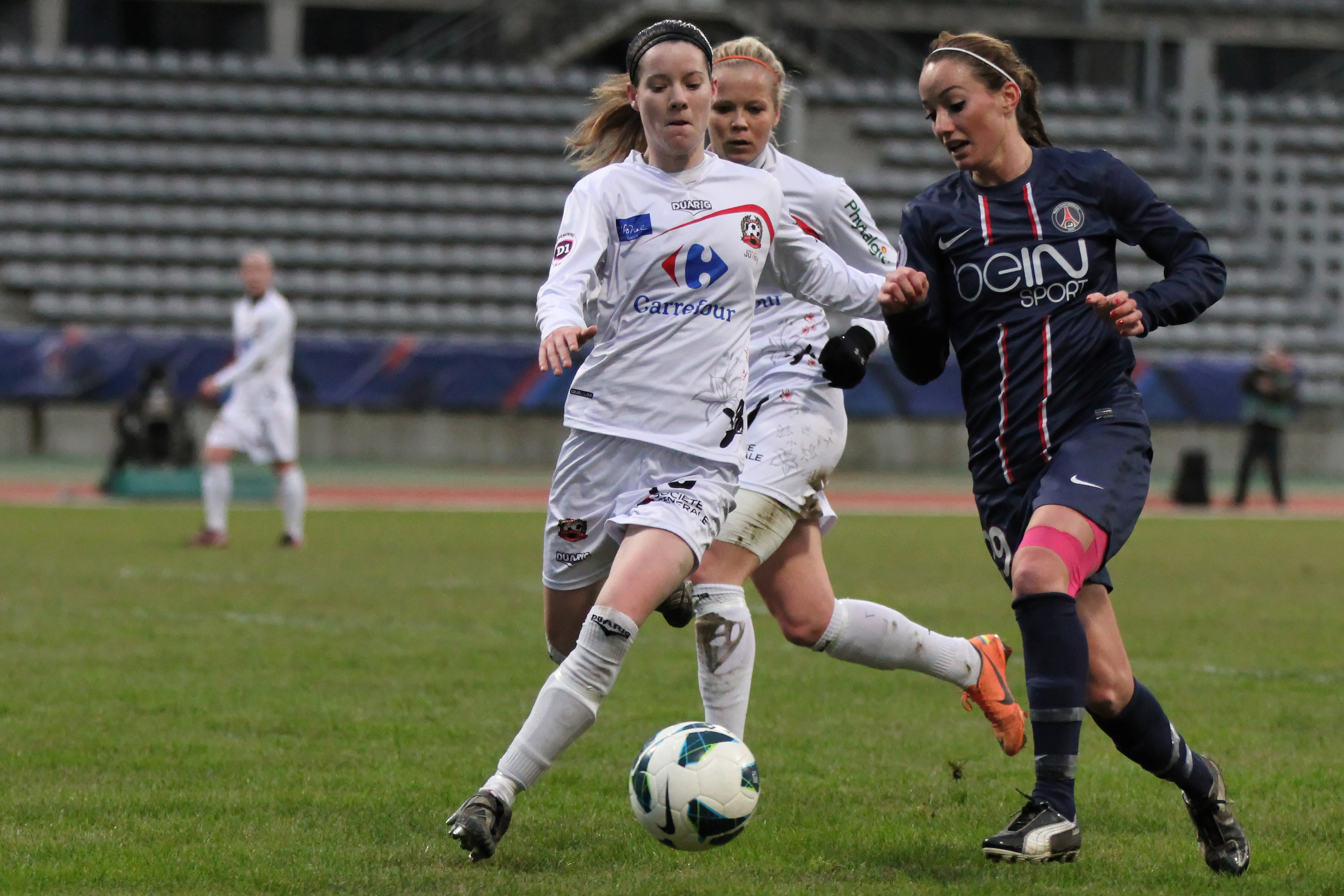
League match between PSG and Paris FC in 2012.

The Paris derby (women), also referred to as Le Derby Francilien, is a French football rivalry contested between PSG and Paris FC (women) (PFC), the two largest professional women's clubs based in Paris, France. Both PFC (formerly Juvisy) and PSG were founded in 1971, making them among the oldest clubs in French women's football.

During the 1990s and 2000s, Juvisy established itself as the dominant Parisian side, regularly competing for national championships alongside OL Lyonnes and benefiting from consistent support from the Essonne departmental council. PSG, in contrast, remained a mid-table club for much of this period, undergoing a squad overhaul in 2005 to promote young talent and restructure the team. Juvisy's sustained strength was highlighted by decisive victories over PSG, illustrating the club's superior resources and squad depth.

PSG gradually closed the gap after 2009, strengthened by key signings and the 2012 takeover by Qatar Sports Investments (QSI), which bolstered the squad and allowed the club to challenge Lyon and assert dominance in the Paris derby. Juvisy's absorption into Paris FC in 2017 created a new dynamic, with PFC seeking to compete with the top teams despite initial difficulties. Throughout the 2010s, PSG largely dominated the derby, while Paris FC emerged as a third force in French women's football during the 2020s.

The Paris derby also extends to men's football, where Paris Saint-Germain FC and Paris FC compete at the highest level. PSG was founded in 1970 and quickly became the leading professional club in the capital, while Paris FC, which split from PSG in 1972, spent decades outside the top flight. Following Paris FC's promotion to Ligue 1 in 2025, the men's derby returned to the French top division for the first time in decades, further intensifying the historical rivalry between the two clubs.

== Honours ==
As of 2023–24 Coupe de France Féminine.

Type	Competitions	Titles	Seasons
National	Première Ligue	1	2020–21
National	Seconde Ligue	1	2000–01
National	Coupe de France Féminine	4	2009–10, 2017–18, 2021–22, 2023–24

== Players ==
=== Current squad ===
As of 4 October 2026.

Note: Flags indicate national team as defined under FIFA eligibility rules; some limited exceptions apply. Players may hold more than one non-FIFA nationality.

No.	Pos.	Nation	Player
1	GK	POL	Katarzyna Kiedrzynek
2	DF	FRA	Thiniba Samoura
3	DF	SRB	Anđela Krstić
4	DF	POL	Paulina Dudek
6	MF	NGR	Jennifer Echegini
7	MF	FRA	Sakina Karchaoui (captain)
8	MF	BRA	Vitória Yaya
10	FW	NGR	Rasheedat Ajibade
11	MF	CAN	Florianne Jourde
12	DF	BRA	Isabela Chagas
14	MF	NED	Jackie Groenen
15	MF	NGR	Oluchi Basil
16	GK	POL	Oliwia Szperkowska
17	FW	NED	Romée Leuchter
18	FW	FRA	Naomie Feller

No.	Pos.	Nation	Player
19	FW	COD	Merveille Kanjinga
20	DF	FRA	Tara Elimbi Gilbert
23	DF	FRA	Noémie Fatier
25	GK	NED	Maren Groothoff
26	MF	FRA	Anaïs Ebayilin
27	MF	FRA	Gabrielle Le Roux
28	DF	FRA	Jade Le Guilly
29	DF	FRA	Griedge Mbock
30	MF	NOR	Emilie Østerås
33	GK	HAI	Océane Toussaint
40	GK	FRA	Camille Masson
47	FW	FRA	Marie Estella Lafontaine
57	FW	FRA	Léa Morissaint
77	DF	ESP	Olga Carmona

=== Out on loan ===
Note: Flags indicate national team as defined under FIFA eligibility rules; some limited exceptions apply. Players may hold more than one non-FIFA nationality.

No.	Pos.	Nation	Player
—	GK	FRA	Alyssa Fernandes (at Toulouse until 30 June 2027)
—	DF	FRA	Eden Le Guilly (at Le Havre until 30 June 2027)
—	MF	FRA	Tanté Diakité (at Nantes until 30 June 2027)

No.	Pos.	Nation	Player
—	FW	NOR	Frøya Dorsin (at Benfica until 30 June 2027)
—	FW	FRA	Ornella Graziani (at Juventus until 30 June 2027)

=== Other players under contract ===
Note: Flags indicate national team as defined under FIFA eligibility rules; some limited exceptions apply. Players may hold more than one non-FIFA nationality.

No.	Pos.	Nation	Player
—	DF	FRA	Mélia Bourdoncle
—	MF	FRA	Lina Grève Chaïb

No.	Pos.	Nation	Player
—	MF	FRA	Katia Imarazene

== Notable players ==
=== Most goals ===
As of 22 September 2026.

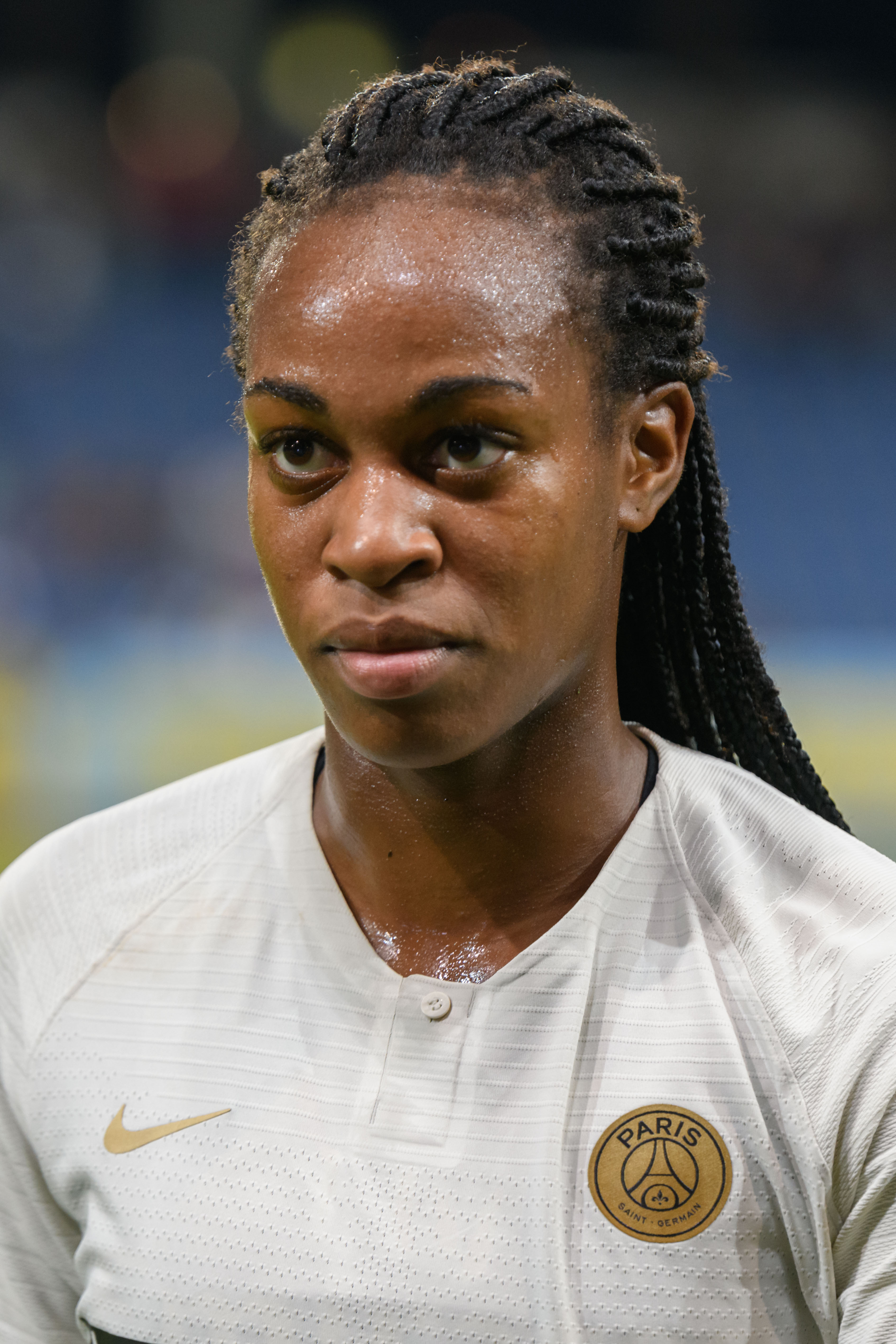
Marie-Antoinette Katoto

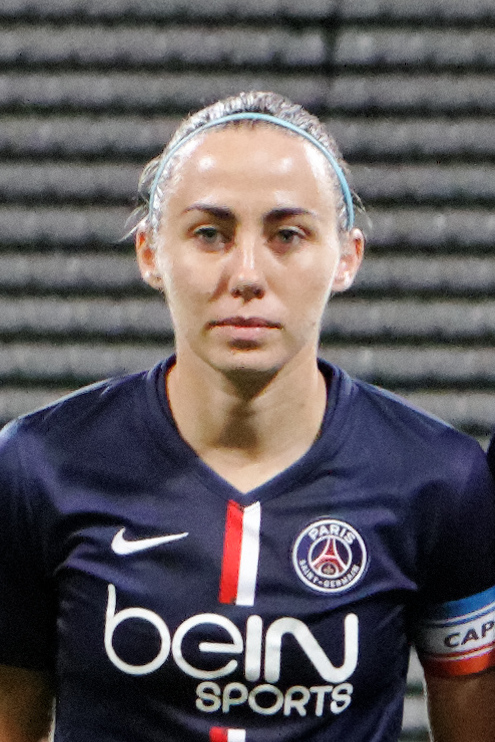
Sabrina Delannoy

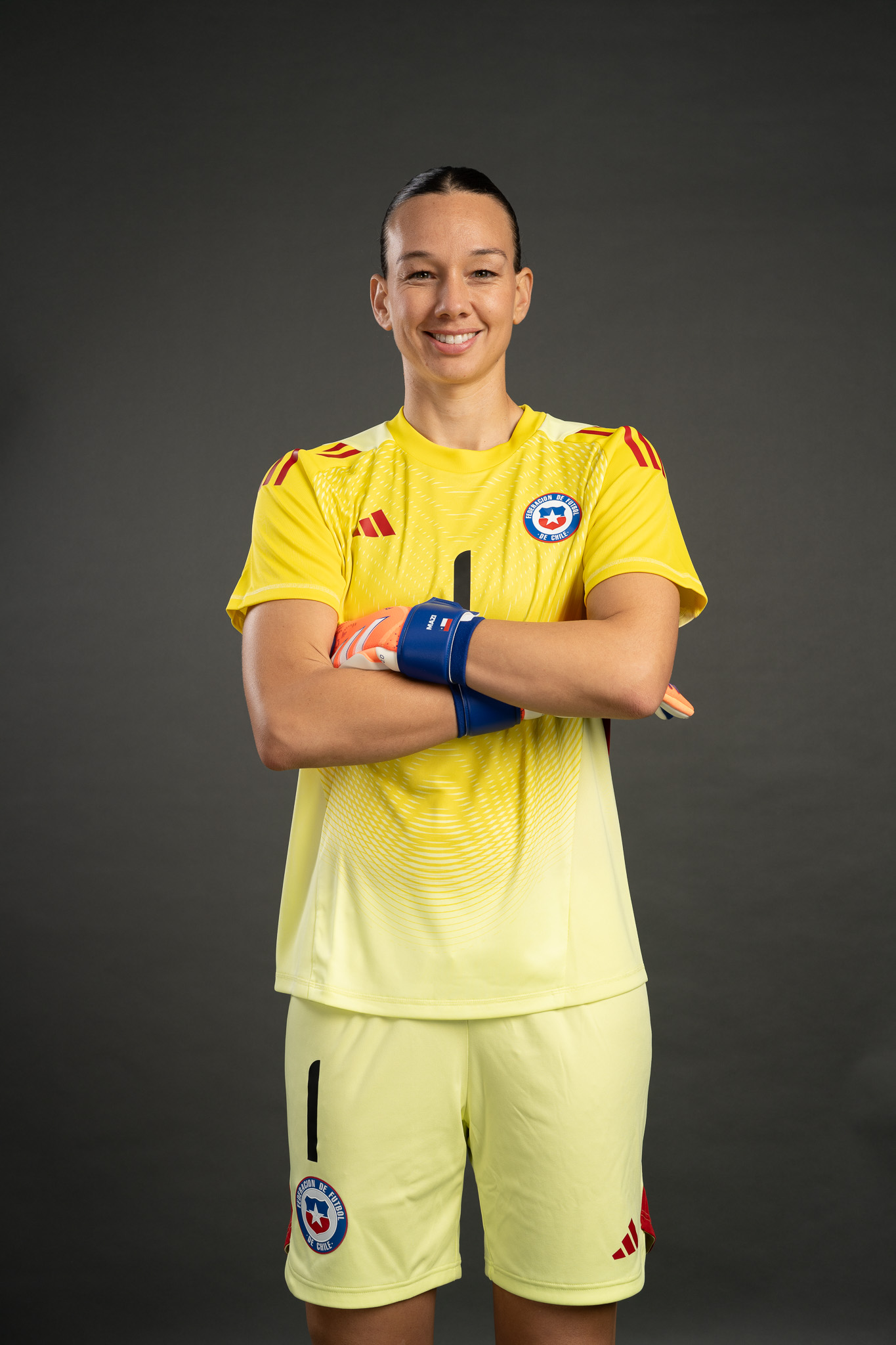
Christiane Endler

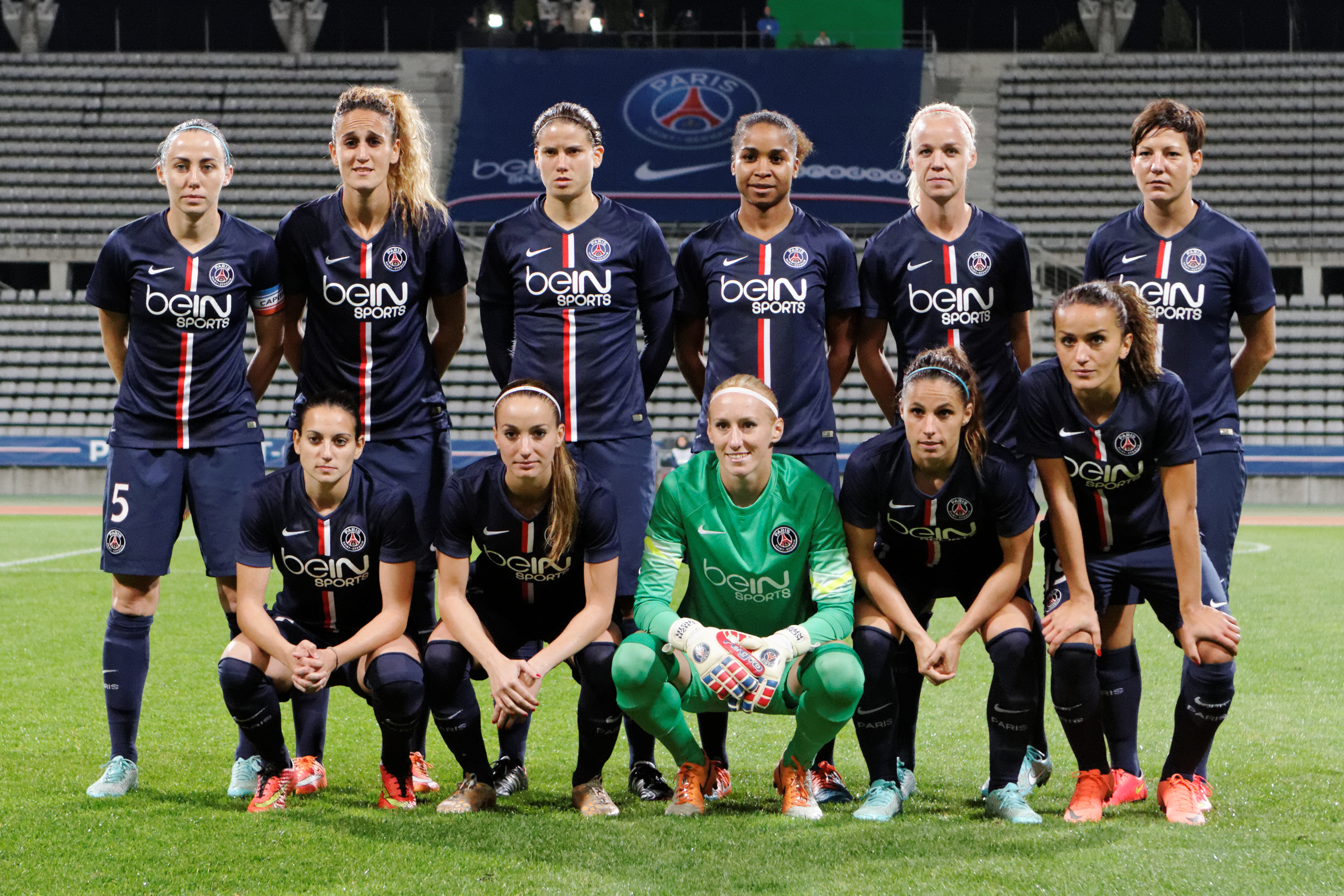
PSG at home to Twente in 2014.

Rank	Player	Position	Paris Saint-Germain	PL	CdF	CdL	TdC	UWCL	Total
1	(France) Marie-Antoinette Katoto	FW	2015–2025	132	20	0	0	28	180
2	(France) Marie-Laure Delie	FW	2007–2008, 2013–2018	93	35	0	0	6	134
3	(France) Kadidiatou Diani	FW	2017–2023	74	6	0	0	11	91
4	(France) Ingrid Boyeldieu	FW	2001–2005, 2008–2010	55	4	0	0	0	59
5	(France) Grace Geyoro	MF	2014–2025	41	7	0	0	6	54
6	(United States) Lindsey Heaps	FW	2012–2016	46	5	0	0	3	54
7	(Brazil) Cristiane	FW	2015–2017	26	12	0	0	12	50
8	(Sweden) Kosovare Asllani	FW	2012–2016	39	5	0	0	1	45
9	(France) Kenza Dali	MF	2011–2016	36	6	0	0	2	44
10	(France) Sandy Baltimore	FW	2016–2024	30	6	0	0	6	42
11	(Netherlands) Romée Leuchter	FW	2024–	27	8	1	0	1	37

=== Most appearances ===
As of 21 November 2026.

Rank	Player	Position	Paris Saint-Germain	PL	CdF	CdL	TdC	UWCL	Total
1	(France) Sabrina Delannoy	DF	2005–2017	244	45	0	0	32	321
2	(France) Grace Geyoro	MF	2014–2025	179	35	0	3	53	270
3	(France) Laure Boulleau	DF	2005–2018	181	36	0	0	15	232
4	(France) Marie-Antoinette Katoto	FW	2015–2025	155	26	0	1	41	223
5	(France) Nonna Debonne	DF	2004–2014	164	27	0	0	4	195
6	(France) Sandy Baltimore	FW	2016–2024	113	26	0	2	43	184
7	(France) Candice Prévost	FW	2003–2012	159	20	0	0	3	182
8	(Canada) Ashley Lawrence	DF	2017–2023	112	27	0	2	37	178
9	(France) Jessica Houara	DF	2009–2016	130	25	0	0	19	174
10	(France) Kadidiatou Diani	FW	2017–2023	114	21	0	2	31	168
11	(Poland) Katarzyna Kiedrzynek	GK	2013–2020, 2023–	104	19	0	1	38	162
12	(Poland) Paulina Dudek	DF	2018–	106	22	0	2	31	161
13	(France) Sakina Karchaoui	MF	2021–	94	20	3	2	42	161

=== Captains ===
No.	Player	Captaincy	Source
1	(France) Florence Freyermuth	2000–2004	
2	(France) Laetitia Duffour	2004–2006	
3	(France) Sabrina Delannoy	2006–2015	
4	(Sweden) Caroline Seger	2015–2016	
5	(Costa Rica) Shirley Cruz	2016–2018	
6	(Brazil) Formiga	2018–2019	
7	(Spain) Irene Paredes	2019–2021	
8	(France) Grace Geyoro	2021–2024	
9	(Poland) Paulina Dudek	2024–2025	
10	(France) Sakina Karchaoui	2025–Present	

=== Awards ===
- The Best FIFA Goalkeeper (1)
  - (Chile) Christiane Endler – 2021.
- IFFHS World's Best Goalkeeper (1)
  - (Chile) Christiane Endler – 2021.

== Personnel ==
=== Current staff ===
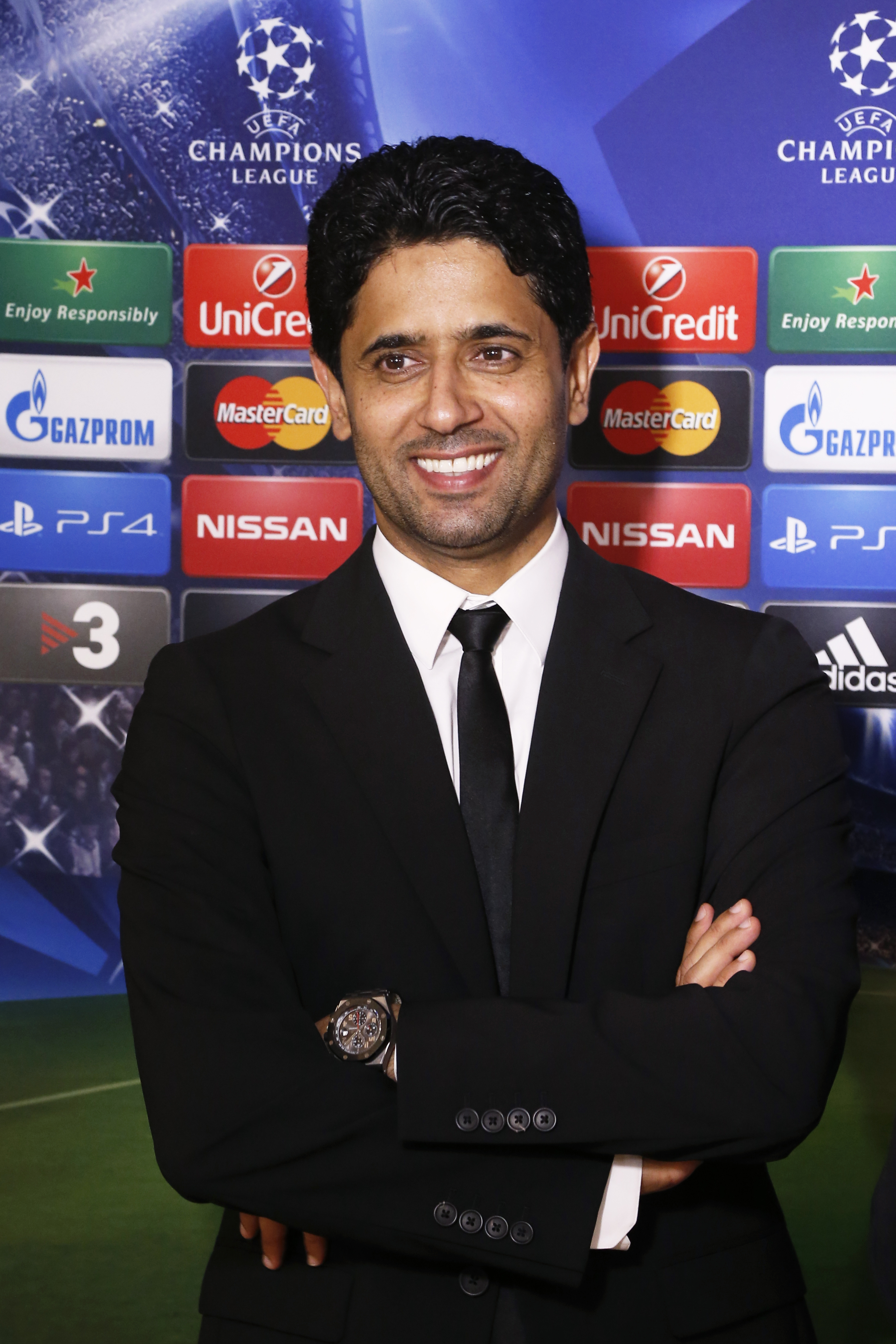
Nasser Al-Khelaïfi

Position	Name	Source
President	(Qatar) Nasser Al-Khelaifi	
Head sporting director	(Italy) Angelo Castellazzi	
Assistant sporting director	(France) Sabrina Delannoy	
First-team head coach	(Brazil) Paulo César	
Assistant coach	(France) Grégory Benarib	
Assistant coach	(France) Noémie Luce	
Assistant coach	(France) Élise Bussaglia	
Goalkeeping coach	(France) Sébastien Moncé	
Fitness coach	(France) Nicolas Colard	
Video analyst	(France) Julien Roger	

=== Managers ===
As of 21 November 2026.

Managers listed from 1999 onwards.

No.	Manager	Tenure	M	W	D	L	GF	GA	GD	Win %	PL	SL	CdF	CdL	TdC	UWCL	Total
1	(France) Sébastien Thierry	Jun. 1999 – Jun. 2004	112	58	23	31	240	146	+94	51.79		1					1
2	(France) Cyril Combettes	Jun. 2004 – Apr. 2007	68	20	15	33	111	135	−24	29.41							
3	(France) Robert Lévêque	Apr. 2007 – Jun. 2007	3	0	1	2	3	5	−2	0.00							
4	(France) Éric Leroy	Jun. 2007 – Jun. 2009	52	21	12	19	70	72	−2	40.38							
5	(France) Camillo Vaz	Jun. 2009 – Jun. 2012	82	56	13	13	205	57	+148	68.29			1				1
6	(France) Farid Benstiti	Jun. 2012 – Jun. 2016	126	97	15	14	420	66	+354	76.98							
7	(France) Patrice Lair	Jun. 2016 – May 2018	64	49	7	8	189	40	+149	76.56							
8	(France) Bernard Mendy	May 2018 – Jun. 2018; May 2022 – Jun. 2022	3	1	0	2	1	2	−1	33.33			1				1
9	(France) Olivier Echouafni	Jun. 2018 – Jun. 2021	90	71	11	8	283	49	+234	78.89	1						1
10	(France) Didier Ollé-Nicolle	Jul. 2021 – May 2022	35	28	4	3	118	21	+97	80.00			1				
11	(France) Gérard Prêcheur	Aug. 2022 – Sep. 2023	40	26	7	7	71	26	+45	65.00							
12	(France) Jocelyn Prêcheur	Sep. 2023 – Jun. 2024	40	24	9	7	103	41	+62	60.00			1				1
13	(France) Fabrice Abriel	Jul. 2024 – May 2025	27	18	5	4	71	20	+51	66.67							
14	(Brazil) Paulo César	May 2025 – Present	58	33	9	16	106	63	+43	56.90							

=== Presidents ===
As of 2023–24 Coupe de France Féminine.

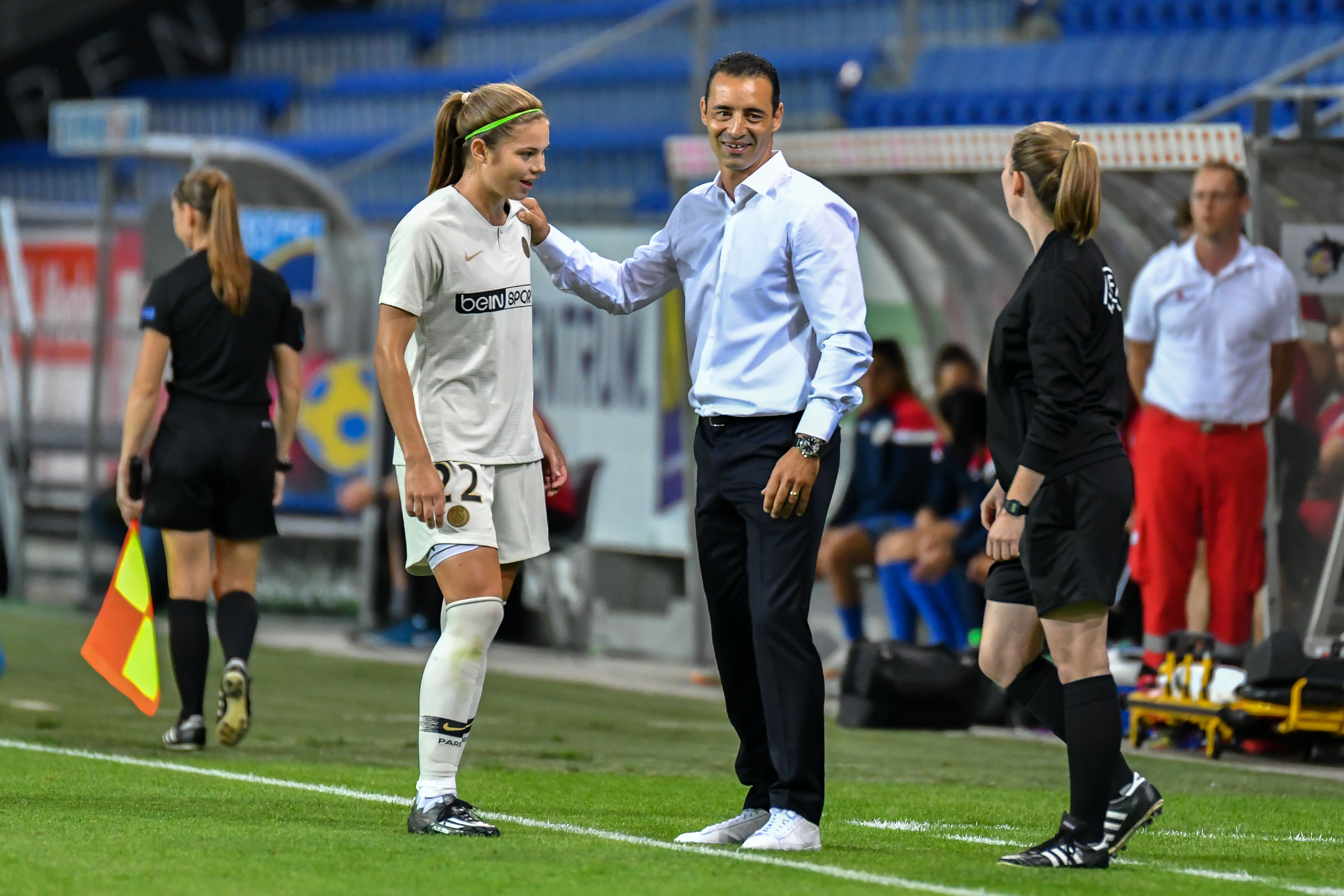
Former PSG manager Olivier Echouafni in 2019.

No.	President	Tenure	PL	SL	CdF	CdL	TdC	UWCL	Total
1	(France) Guy Crescent	Jun. 1971 – Dec. 1971							
2	(France) Henri Patrelle	Dec. 1971 – Jun. 1974							
3	(France) Daniel Hechter	Jun. 1974 – Jan. 1978							
4	(France) Francis Borelli	Jan. 1978 – May 1991							
5	(France) Bernard Brochand	May 1991 – Jun. 2001		1					1
6	(France) Alain Cayzac	Jun. 2001 – Jun. 2006							
7	(France) Simon Tahar	Jun. 2006 – Sep. 2012			1				1
8	(Qatar) Nasser Al-Khelaifi	Sep. 2012 – Present	1		3				4
