= 2022 Norwegian Fourth Division =

4. divisjon
- Season: 2022
- Promoted: 18 teams

The 2022 season of the 4. divisjon, the fifth highest association football league for men in Norway.

Due to the receding COVID-19 pandemic in Norway, some changes from the previous years were reverted. Indre Østland, Agder, Sogn og Fjordane changed from two groups to one; Hordaland and Trøndelag from four groups to two.

Finnmark introduced a regular/playoff format. The 8 teams played a round-robin tournament, whereafter the top 4 would play each other off and the bottom 4 do the same, retaining all points from the regular season. The playoffs were similar to championship rounds and relegation rounds from other leagues, but were named playoff A and playoff B, respectively.

== Teams ==
Østfold

1. Råde – lost playoff
2. Kråkerøy
3. Drøbak-Frogn
4. Sarpsborg
5. Østsiden
6. Kvik Halden 2
7. Borgen
8. Sparta Sarpsborg
9. Moss 2
10. Lisleby
11. Ås
12. Tistedalen
13. Rakkestad – relegated
14. Greåker – relegated

Oslo 1

1. KFUM 2 − promoted
2. Gamle Oslo
3. Holmen
4. Lommedalen
5. Oldenborg
6. Bærum 2
7. Oppsal 2
8. Asker 2
9. Manglerud Star
10. Oslojuvelene
11. Hasle-Løren − relegated
12. Gui − relegated

Oslo 2

1. Ullern 2 – promoted
2. Årvoll
3. Holmlia
4. Heming
5. Stovner
6. Fagerborg
7. Lyn 2
8. Christiania
9. Kolbotn
10. Rilindja − relegated
11. Veitvet − relegated
12. Nesodden − relegated

Akershus

1. Skedsmo – promoted
2. Ull/Kisa 2
3. Raumnes & Årnes
4. Eidsvold
5. Gjelleråsen 2
6. Kløfta
7. Lørenskog 2
8. Sørumsand
9. Hauerseter
10. Aurskog-Høland
11. Eidsvold Turn 2
12. Rælingen
13. Strømmen 2
14. Gjerdrum − relegated

Indre Østland

1. Ham-Kam 2 – promoted
2. Kolbukameratene
3. Nybergsund
4. Faaberg
5. Ottestad
6. Gjøvik-Lyn 2
7. Gran
8. Brumunddal 2
9. Furnes
10. Løten
11. Engerdal − relegated
12. Elverum 2 − relegated
13. Reinsvoll − relegated
14. Sander − relegated

Buskerud

1. Åskollen – won playoff
2. Åssiden
3. Drammens BK
4. Vestfossen
5. Hallingdal
6. Modum
7. Eiker/Kvikk
8. Svelvik
9. Jevnaker
10. Konnerud
11. Sande
12. ROS
13. Kongsberg
14. Huringen − relegated

Vestfold

1. Sandefjord 2 − won playoff
2. Flint
3. Sandefjord BK
4. Eik Tønsberg 2
5. Ørn-Horten 2
6. Teie
7. Re
8. Nøtterøy
9. Stag/Fram 2
10. Stokke
11. Husøy & Foynland
12. Larvik Turn − relegated

Telemark

1. Hei – lost playoff
2. Stathelle og Omegn
3. Tollnes
4. Odd 3
5. Storm
6. Pors 2
7. Eidanger
8. Notodden 2
9. Skarphedin
10. Gulset − relegated
11. Nome − relegated

- Snøgg – pulled team

Agder

1. Donn − promoted
2. Trauma
3. Våg
4. Vigør
5. Jerv 2
6. Lyngdal
7. Søgne
8. Fløy 2
9. Torridal
10. Vindbjart 2
11. Froland
12. Hisøy
13. Rygene − relegated

- Kvinesdal – pulled team

Rogaland 1

1. Eiger − promoted
2. Hinna
3. Riska
4. Forus og Gausel
5. Ålgård
6. Bryne 2
7. Randaberg
8. Hana
9. Stavanger
10. Hundvåg
11. Sola 2 − relegated
12. Egersund 2
13. Sunde − relegated
14. Sokndal − relegated

Rogaland 2

1. Madla − promoted
2. Varhaug
3. Rosseland
4. Frøyland
5. Vardeneset
6. Nord
7. Vard Haugesund 2
8. Vidar 2
9. Kopervik
10. Klepp
11. Djerv 1919 2
12. Skjold
13. Tasta − relegated

- Lura – pulled team

Hordaland 1

1. Loddefjord − promoted
2. Askøy
3. Varegg
4. Nymark
5. Austevoll
6. Sund
7. Lyngbø
8. Sotra 2
9. NHHI
10. Trott
11. Østsiden Askøy − relegated
12. Fyllingsdalen 2 − relegated

Hordaland 2

1. Gneist − promoted
2. Voss
3. Åsane 2
4. Arna-Bjørnar
5. Osterøy
6. Tertnes
7. Nordhordland
8. Flaktveit
9. Fana 2
10. Øystese
11. Os 2 − relegated
12. Bergen Nord − relegated

Sogn og Fjordane

1. Sogndal 2 − promoted
2. Årdal
3. Fjøra
4. Eid
5. Stryn
6. Høyang
7. Førde 2
8. Studentspretten
9. Måløy
10. Vik
11. Bremanger
12. Jølster

Sunnmøre

1. Herd – lost playoff
2. Bergsøy
3. Rollon
4. SIF/Hessa
5. Norborg/Brattvåg 2
6. Hovdebygda
7. Ørsta
8. Hareid
9. Blindheim
10. Langevåg
11. Emblem − relegated
12. Larsnes/Gursken/Gjerdsvika − relegated

Nordmøre og Romsdal

1. Kristiansund 2 − won playoff
2. Surnadal
3. Tomrefjord
4. Sunndal
5. Dahle
6. Træff 2
7. Eide og Omegn
8. Vestnes Varfjell
9. Midsund
10. Åndalsnes
11. Malmefjorden
12. Kristiansund FK/Clausenengen − relegated

Trøndelag 1

1. Verdal − promoted
2. NTNUI
3. Vuku
4. Stjørdals-Blink 2
5. Levanger 2
6. Sverresborg
7. Kvik
8. Rørvik
9. Flatanger
10. Namsos
11. Byåsen 2 − relegated

- Kolstad 2 – pulled team

Trøndelag 2

1. Trønder-Lyn − promoted
2. Ranheim 2
3. Heimdal
4. KIL/Hemne
5. Orkla 2
6. Strindheim 2
7. Hitra
8. Nardo 2
9. Tynset
10. Charlottenlund
11. Buvik − relegated
12. Svorkmo − relegated

Nordland

1. Mosjøen − won playoff
2. Grand Bodø
3. Fauske/Sprint
4. Sandnessjøen
5. Bodø/Glimt 3 – withdrew after season
6. Rana 2
7. Meløy – withdrew after season
8. Bossmo & Ytteren
9. Junkeren 2 – relegated

- Mo – pulled team

Hålogaland

1. Skånland − won playoff
2. Landsås
3. Medkila
4. Melbo
5. Lofoten
6. Sortland
7. Morild
8. Andenes
9. Leknes
10. Ballstad

Troms

1. Hamna – lost playoff
2. Skarp
3. Finnsnes
4. Ishavsbyen
5. Tromsdalen 2
6. Krokelvdalen
7. Storelva
8. Salangen
9. Ulfstind
10. Lyngen/Karnes – relegated
11. Valhall – relegated
12. Kvaløya – relegated

Finnmark

1. HIF/Stein
2. Alta 2
3. Nordlys
4. Porsanger
5. Kirkenes
6. Norild
7. Sørøy Glimt
8. Honningsvåg

Finnmark playoff A

1. HIF/Stein − won playoff
2. Alta 2
3. Nordlys
4. Porsanger

Finnmark playoff B

1. Kirkenes
2. Norild
3. Sørøy Glimt
4. Honningsvåg

== Playoffs ==
- Sandefjord 2 beat Råde.
- Åskollen beat Hei.
- Kristiansund 2 beat Herd.
- Mosjøen beat Skånland.
- HIF/Stein beat Hamna.
- Skånland beat Hamna.
