= 2017 Norwegian Fourth Division =

4. divisjon
- Season: 2017

The 2017 season of the 4. divisjon, the fifth highest association football league for men in Norway.

Between 22 and 26 games (depending on group size) were played in 24 groups, with 3 points given for wins and 1 for draws. Group winners were promoted to the 3. divisjon.

== Teams ==
Group 1

1. Selbak – promoted
2. Råde
3. Ås
4. Fredrikstad 2
5. Borgen
6. Tistedalen
7. Kråkerøy 2
8. Borgar
9. Rakkestad
10. Sparta Sarpsborg
11. Sarpsborg
12. Moss 2 – relegated
13. Kvik Halden 2 – relegated
14. Trosvik – relegated

Group 2

1. Grei – promoted
2. Holmlia
3. Lommedalen
4. Skeid 2
5. Bærum 2
6. Rommen
7. Lyn 2
8. Oppsal 2
9. Vollen
10. Vestli
11. Romsås
12. Røa

Group 3

1. Rilindja – promoted
2. Heming
3. Kjelsås 2
4. Fortuna Oslo
5. Årvoll
6. Follo 2
7. Ullern 2
8. Oslojuvelene
9. Majorstuen
10. Fremad Famagusta
11. Frigg 2
12. Hasle-Løren

Group 4

1. KFUM Oslo 2 – promoted
2. Nordstrand
3. Asker 2
4. Grorud 2
5. Kolbotn
6. Manglerud Star
7. Ski
8. Nesodden
9. Fagerborg
10. Gøy-Nor (changed name to Christiania)
11. Lille Tøyen – relegated
12. Oslo City

Group 5

1. Gjelleråsen – promoted
2. Kløfta
3. Aurskog-Høland
4. Raumnes & Årnes
5. Strømmen 2
6. Ull/Kisa IL 2
7. Skedsmo 2
8. Hauerseter
9. Blaker
10. Eidsvold Turn 2
11. Eidsvold
12. Fet
13. Lørenskog 2 – relegated
14. Gjerdrum – relegated

Group 6

1. Løten – promoted
2. Gran
3. Kolbukameratene
4. Faaberg
5. Follebu
6. Brumunddal 2
7. Toten
8. Gjøvik-Lyn 2
9. Ridabu
10. Snertingdal/Redalen 2 – relegated
11. Nordre Land
12. Fron – relegated

Group 7

1. Ottestad – promoted
2. Kongsvinger 2
3. Ham-Kam 2
4. Storhamar
5. Moelven
6. Engerdal
7. Sander
8. Trysil
9. MBK Domkirkeodden
10. Eidskog
11. Fart – relegated

- Nybergsund 2 – pulled team

Group 8

1. Åssiden – promoted
2. Mjøndalen 2
3. Hallingdal
4. Modum
5. Strømsgodset 3 – relegated
6. Kongsberg
7. Solberg
8. Svelvik
9. Drammens BK
10. Steinberg
11. Hønefoss 2 – relegated
12. Jevnaker
13. Konnerud
14. Slemmestad

Group 9

1. Sandefjord 2 – promoted
2. Flint
3. Eik Tønsberg
4. Runar
5. Tønsberg FK
6. Husøy & Foynland
7. Larvik Turn
8. FK Tønsberg 2
9. Re
10. Nanset

- Nesjar - pulled team
- Skoppum - pulled team

Group 10

1. Urædd – promoted
2. Hei
3. Skarphedin
4. Tollnes
5. Pors 2
6. Herkules
7. FK Grenland – relegated
8. Notodden 2
9. Ulefoss
10. Stathelle og Omegn
11. Skade

- Skotfoss – pulled team

Group 11

1. Donn – promoted
2. Lyngdal
3. Jerv 2
4. Vindbjart 2
5. Vigør
6. Mandalskameratene
7. Arendal 2
8. Søgne
9. Flekkefjord
10. Våg
11. Randesund
12. Hægebostad – relegated
13. Giv Akt – relegated
14. Gimletroll – relegated

Group 12

1. Egersund 2 – promoted
2. Randaberg
3. Klepp
4. Eiger
5. Hundvåg
6. Hinna
7. Sola 2
8. Midtbygden
9. Hana
10. Rosseland
11. Voll
12. Sunde – relegated
13. Buøy – relegated
14. Havørn – relegated

Group 13

1. Vardeneset – promoted
2. Åkra
3. Riska
4. Kopervik
5. Skjold
6. Frøyland
7. Ålgård
8. Djerv 1919
9. Nærbø
10. Vaulen
11. Varhaug
12. Vard 2 – relegated
13. Austrått – relegated
14. Avaldsnes – relegated

Group 14

1. Tertnes – promoted
2. Trott
3. NHH
4. Bjarg
5. Fyllingsdalen 2
6. Gneist
7. Vestsiden-Askøy
8. Lyngbø
9. Fana 2
10. Austevoll
11. Djerv – relegated
12. Bremnes – relegated

Group 15

1. Øystese – promoted
2. Arna-Bjørnar
3. Sund
4. Loddefjord
5. Ny-Krohnborg
6. Åsane 2
7. Sandviken
8. Odda
9. Nordhordland
10. Vadmyra – relegated
11. Voss – relegated
12. Nest-Sotra 2 – relegated

Group 16

1. Sogndal 2 – promoted
2. Stryn
3. Florø 2
4. Årdal
5. Eid
6. Vik
7. Dale
8. Tornado Måløy
9. Skavøypoll
10. Bremanger
11. Førde 2 – relegated
12. Høyang – relegated

Group 17

1. Hødd 2 – promoted
2. Bergsøy
3. Volda
4. Skarbøvik (changed name to SIF/Hessa)
5. Rollon
6. Emblem
7. Hareid
8. Godøy
9. Sykkylven
10. Larsnes/Gursken
11. Langevåg – relegated
12. Norborg – relegated

Group 18

1. Kristiansund 2 – promoted
2. Kristiansund FK
3. Sunndal
4. Surnadal
5. Tomrefjord
6. Averøykameratene
7. Eide og Omegn
8. Vestnes Varfjell
9. Træff 2
10. Frei – relegated
11. Elnesvågen og Omegn
12. Eidsvåg – relegated

Group 19

1. Levanger 2 – promoted
2. Kvik
3. Namsos
4. Trygg/Lade
5. NTNUI
6. Rørvik
7. Charlottenlund
8. Strindheim 2 – relegated
9. Vuku
10. Nardo 2
11. Vestbyen
12. Stjørdals-Blink 2

Group 20

1. Melhus – promoted
2. KIL/Hemne
3. Ranheim 2
4. Heimdal
5. Orkla 2
6. Kattem (merged with Heimdal post-season)
7. Tydal
8. Byåsen 2
9. Røros
10. Meldal
11. Alvdal – relegated
12. Buvik – relegated

Group 21

1. Stålkameratene – promoted
2. Bodø/Glimt 2
3. Fauske/Sprint
4. Sandnessjøen
5. Brønnøysund
6. Grand Bodø
7. Innstranden
8. Junkeren 2 – relegated
9. Mo 2 – relegated
10. Åga
11. Meløy – relegated

- Saltdalkameratene – pulled team

Group 22

1. Melbo – promoted
2. Lofoten
3. Leknes
4. Grovfjord
5. Skånland
6. Stålbrott/Sortland 2
7. Morild
8. Medkila
9. Ballstad
10. Landsås
11. Høken – relegated
12. Harstad 2 (merged with Grovfjord post-season)

Group 23

1. Skarp – promoted
2. Lyngen/Karnes
3. Tromsø 3 – relegated
4. Tromsdalen 2
5. Nordkjosbotn
6. Krokelvdalen
7. Storelva
8. Stakkevollan
9. Finnsnes 2
10. Ishavsbyen
11. Senja 2 – relegated
12. Burfjord – relegated

Group 24

1. Bjørnevatn – promoted
2. Norild
3. Nordlys
4. Hammerfest (merged with HIF/Stein post-season)
5. Kirkenes
6. Tverrelvdalen
7. Sørøy Glimt
8. Porsanger
9. Honningsvåg
10. Bossekop
11. Kautokeino
12. Indrefjord
