= 2009 Norwegian Third Division =

Norwegian football league season

The 2009 season of the 3. divisjon, the fourth highest association football league for men in Norway.

Between 22 and 26 games (depending on group size) were played in 24 groups, with 3 points given for wins and 1 for draws. Twelve teams were promoted to the 2. divisjon through playoff.

== Tables ==
Oslo 1

1. Lommedalen – lost playoff
2. Kjelsås 2
3. KFUM 2
4. Grüner
5. Asker 2
6. Bygdø Monolitten
7. Sagene
8. Oldenborg
9. Vestli
10. Jutul
11. Rommen
12. Kurer – relegated

Oslo 2

1. Frigg – won playoff
2. Hasle-Løren
3. Grorud
4. Bærum 2
5. Røa
6. Bøler
7. Årvoll
8. Øvrevoll Hosle
9. Ullern 2 – relegated
10. Frognerparken
11. Vollen – relegated
12. Holmen – relegated

Oslo 3

1. Oslo City – won playoff
2. Nesodden
3. Nordstrand
4. Kolbotn
5. Follo 2
6. Langhus
7. Holmlia
8. Skeid 2
9. Korsvoll 2 – relegated
10. Oppsal
11. Grei – relegated
12. Lille Tøyen – relegated

Akershus

1. Høland – lost playoff
2. Lørenskog 2
3. Hauerseter
4. Skedsmo
5. Fjellhamar
6. Sørumsand
7. Strømmen 2
8. Funnefoss/Vormsund
9. Gjerdrum
10. Ull/Kisa 2 – relegated
11. Eidsvold – relegated
12. Aurskog/Finstadbru – relegated
13. Skjetten 2 – relegated
14. Fet – relegated

Indre Østland 1

1. Brumunddal – won playoff
2. Gjøvik FF
3. Ham-Kam 2
4. Follebu
5. Nordre Land
6. Ringsaker
7. Moelven
8. Redalen
9. Søndre Land
10. Vind
11. Fart – relegated
12. Lom – relegated

Indre Østland 2

1. Flisa – lost playoff
2. Sander
3. Ottestad
4. Kongsvinger 2
5. Raufoss 2
6. Elverum
7. Løten
8. Kolbu/KK
9. Eidskog
10. Hadeland – relegated
11. Toten – relegated
12. Trysil – relegated

Buskerud

1. Birkebeineren – lost playoff
2. Jevnaker
3. Mjøndalen 2
4. Kongsberg
5. Vestfossen
6. Åssiden
7. Modum
8. Konnerud
9. Svelvik
10. Solberg – relegated
11. Hokksund – relegated
12. Åmot – relegated

Østfold

1. Kvik/Halden – lost playoff
2. Østsiden
3. Sprint-Jeløy
4. Sarpsborg 2
5. Mysen
6. Moss 2
7. Rakkestad
8. Selbak
9. Askim
10. Drøbak/Frogn 2 – relegated
11. Trøgstad/Båstad
12. Ås – relegated
13. Rygge – relegated
14. Lisleby – relegated

Vestfold

1. Ørn-Horten – won playoff
2. Sandefjord 2
3. FK Tønsberg 2
4. Eik-Tønsberg
5. Husøy & Foynland
6. Tønsberg FK
7. Flint
8. Runar
9. Larvik Turn
10. Falk
11. Sandar
- Svarstad – pulled team

Telemark

1. Odd 2 – won playoff
2. Skarphedin
3. Notodden 2
4. Urædd
5. Tollnes
6. Skotfoss
7. Herkules
8. Pors Grenland 2
9. Kjapp
10. Ulefoss
11. Stathelle og Omegn
12. Brevik
13. Sannidal
14. Klyve – relegated

Agder

1. Jerv – lost playoff
2. Lyngdal
3. Søgne
4. Trauma
5. Grane
6. Gimletroll
7. Våg
8. Giv Akt
9. Donn
10. Birkenes
11. Farsund
12. Vigør – relegated
13. Tveit – relegated
14. Mandalskameratene 2 – relegated

Rogaland 1

1. Vidar – won playoff
2. Staal Jørpeland
3. Egersund
4. Vardeneset
5. Havørn
6. Bryne 2
7. Stavanger 2
8. Brodd
9. Sandnes Ulf 2
10. Sandved
11. Randaberg 2
12. Buøy
13. Hundvåg – relegated
14. Austrått – relegated

Rogaland 2

1. Viking 2 – lost playoff
2. Haugesund 2
3. Hinna
4. Klepp
5. Skjold
6. Vaulen
7. Vedavåg Karmøy
8. Nord
9. Ålgård 2
10. Frøyland
11. Hana
12. Åkra
13. Avaldsnes
14. Djerv 1919 – relegated

Hordaland 1

1. Austevoll – lost playoff
2. Brann 2
3. Vadmyra
4. Arna-Bjørnar
5. Askøy
6. Baune
7. Vestsiden-Askøy
8. Smørås
9. Hald
10. Bergen Nord
11. Follese – relegated
12. Sandviken – relegated

Hordaland 2

1. Os – won playoff
2. Tertnes
3. Lyngbø
4. Løv-Ham 2
5. Voss
6. Norheimsund
7. Bjarg
8. Nordhordland
9. Odda
10. Hovding
11. Djerv – relegated
12. Trio – relegated

Sogn og Fjordane

1. Førde – won playoff
2. Tornado Måløy
3. Årdal
4. Sogndal 2
5. Stryn
6. Høyang
7. Eid
8. Jølster
9. Fjøra
10. Florø
11. Vik
12. Kaupanger – relegated

Sunnmøre

1. Aalesund 2 – won playoff
2. Herd
3. Spjelkavik
4. Rollon
5. Hødd 2
6. Valder
7. Volda
8. Brattvåg
9. Norborg
10. Godøy
11. Hareid
12. Langevåg – relegated

Nordmøre og Romsdal

1. Kristiansund 2
2. Træff – lost playoff
3. Sunndal
4. Elnesvågen/Omegn
5. Dahle
6. Rival
7. Surnadal
8. Åndalsnes
9. Eidsvåg
10. Averøykameratene
11. Vestnes Varfjell – relegated
12. Måndalen – relegated

Trøndelag 1

1. Kolstad – won playoff
2. KIL/Hemne
3. Strindheim 2
4. Stjørdals-Blink
5. Rosenborg 3
6. NTNUI
7. Buvik
8. Tangmoen
9. Tynset
10. Orkla
11. Melhus – relegated
12. Nidelv – relegated

Trøndelag 2

1. Charlottenlund – lost playoff
2. Verdal
3. Tiller
4. Namsos
5. Kattem
6. Malvik
7. Steinkjer 2
8. Vuku
9. Byåsen 2
10. Neset
11. Heimdal
12. Ranheim 2 – relegated

Nordland

1. Stålkameratene – lost playoff
2. Innstranden
3. Steigen
4. Mosjøen
5. Brønnøysund
6. Meløy
7. Herøy/Dønna
8. Sandnessjøen
9. Tverlandet
10. Fauske/Sprint
11. Saltdalkameratene – relegated

Hålogaland

1. Harstad – won playoff
2. Mjølner
3. Sortland
4. Landsås
5. Lofoten
6. Skånland
7. Hardhaus
8. Grovfjord
9. Medkila
10. Leknes
11. Melbo

Troms

1. Senja – won playoff
2. Skarp
3. Fløya
4. Bardufoss og Omegn
5. Skjervøy
6. Finnsnes
7. Ishavsbyen
8. Tromsdalen 2
9. Lyngen/Karnes
10. Salangen
11. Tromsø 3
12. Nordreisa – relegated

Finnmark

1. Kirkenes – lost playoff
2. Hammerfest
3. Sørøy/Glimt
4. Bjørnevatn
5. Porsanger
6. Kautokeino
7. Tverrelvdalen
8. Norild
9. Alta 2
10. Bossekop 2 – relegated
11. Nordkinn
