= 2021 Norwegian Fourth Division =

4. divisjon
- Season: 2021
- Promoted: 18 teams

The 2021 season of the 4. divisjon, the fifth highest association football league for men in Norway.

The league was consolidated: Oslo went from three to two groups, and Indre Østland's two groups were reduced in size.

Teams did not necessarily play each other home and away, because the first matchday was severely delayed due to the COVID-19 pandemic in Norway. In some districts, groups were made smaller to facilitate both home and away matches, whereas in larger groups the teams met only once.

Hordaland, Sogn og Fjordane and Trøndelag split their groups, doubling their respective number of groups, but with no more teams than before.

Sogn og Fjordane's two groups were unique in that every single team advanced to a playoff, where #1 from the two groups faced each other home and away, #2 from the two groups faced each other and so on.

== Teams ==
Østfold

1. Sprint-Jeløy − promoted
2. Råde
3. Lisleby
4. Drøbak-Frogn
5. Østsiden
6. Kvik Halden 2
7. Moss 2
8. Rakkestad
9. Tistedalen
10. Ås
11. Sarpsborg
12. Borgen
13. Kråkerøy 2 – relegated
14. Selbak

Oslo 1

1. Grei − promoted
2. Gamle Oslo
3. Manglerud Star
4. Nesodden
5. Oslojuvelene
6. Ullern 2
7. Kolbotn
8. KFUM 2
9. Oppsal 2
10. Fagerborg
11. Follo 2 − relegated
12. Holmlia
13. Ready 2 − relegated
14. Fremad Famagusta − relegated

Oslo 2

1. Kjelsås 2 – promoted
2. Heming
3. Holmen
4. Årvoll
5. Bærum 2
6. Lommedalen
7. Lyn 2
8. Rilindja
9. Christiania
10. Asker 2
11. Gui
12. Majorstuen − relegated
13. Sagene − relegated
14. Stabæk 3 − relegated

Akershus

1. Skjetten – promoted
2. Eidsvold
3. Kløfta
4. Skedsmo
5. Gjelleråsen 2
6. Raumnes & Årnes
7. Strømmen 2
8. Aurskog-Høland
9. Lørenskog 2
10. Eidsvold Turn 2
11. Gjerdrum
12. Sørumsand
13. Blaker – relegated
14. Fjellhamar – relegated

Indre Østland 1

1. Lillehammer – promoted
2. Ham-Kam 2
3. Kolbukameratene
4. Gran
5. Faaberg
6. Reinsvoll
7. Valdres – relegated

Indre Østland 2

1. Engerdal – lost playoff
2. Ottestad
3. Elverum 2
4. Løten
5. Furnes
6. Sander
7. Trysil − relegated

Buskerud

1. Vestfossen – lost playoff
2. Modum
3. Drammens BK
4. Sande/Berger
5. Hallingdal
6. Åskollen
7. Svelvik
8. Kongsberg
9. Huringen
10. Jevnaker
11. Konnerud
12. Stoppen – relegated
13. Solberg – relegated
14. Birkebeineren – relegated

Vestfold

1. Sandefjord 2 – lost playoff
2. Eik Tønsberg 2
3. Flint 2 – relegated
4. Stag/Fram 2
5. Sandefjord BK
6. Ørn-Horten 2
7. Re
8. Teie
9. Borre – pulled team after season
10. Stokke
11. Larvik Turn
12. Runar – relegated

Telemark

1. Urædd – promoted
2. Stathelle og Omegn
3. Hei
4. Odd 3
5. Notodden 2
6. Storm
7. Gulset
8. Pors 2
9. Skarphedin
10. Snøgg
11. Nome
12. Langesund – relegated

Agder 1

1. Søgne – lost playoff
2. Vigør
3. Lyngdal
4. Fløy 2
5. Kvinesdal
6. Giv Akt/Mandalskameratene 2 – relegated

Agder 2

1. Randesund – promoted
2. Jerv 2
3. Trauma
4. Froland
5. Våg
6. Hisøy

Rogaland 1

1. Sandnes Ulf 2 – promoted
2. Eiger
3. Varhaug
4. Sola 2
5. Rosseland
6. Ålgård
7. Klepp
8. Frøyland
9. Vardeneset
10. Vidar 2
11. Lura
12. Egersund 2
13. Nærbø – relegated
14. Vaulen – relegated

Rogaland 2

1. Haugesund 2 – promoted
2. Kopervik
3. Bryne 2
4. Djerv 1919 2
5. Riska
6. Vard Haugesund 2
7. Hana
8. Randaberg
9. Hundvåg
10. Skjold
11. Stavanger
12. Sunde
13. Havdur – relegated
14. Austrått – relegated

Hordaland 1A

1. Bremnes – promoted
2. Sund
3. Åsane 2
4. Austevoll
5. Trott
6. Nordre Fjell – relegated

Hordaland 1B

1. Bergen Nord – lost playoff
2. Askøy
3. Gneist
4. Tertnes
5. Fyllingsdalen 2
6. Smørås – relegated

Hordaland 2A

1. Lyngbø – lost playoff
2. Arna-Bjørnar
3. Voss
4. NHHI
5. Os 2
6. Djerv – relegated

Hordaland 2B

1. Frøya – promoted
2. Nordhordland
3. Loddefjord
4. Osterøy
5. Varegg
6. Mathopen – relegated

Sogn og Fjordane 1 and 2

1. Eid
2. Måløy
3. Studentspretten
4. Vik
5. Dale
6. Syril
1. Førde
2. Stryn
3. Høyang
4. Jølster
5. Bremanger
6. Kaupanger

Sogn og Fjordane after playoffs

1. Førde – promoted
2. Eid
3. Stryn
4. Måløy
5. Studentspretten
6. Høyang
7. Jølster
8. Vik
9. Bremanger
10. Dale – relegated
11. Kaupanger – relegated
12. Syril – relegated

Sunnmøre

1. Hødd 2 – promoted
2. Herd
3. Rollon
4. Hovdebygda
5. SIF/Hessa
6. Bergsøy
7. Larsnes/Gursken
8. Langevåg
9. Emblem
10. Norborg/Brattvåg 2
11. Hareid
12. Valder – relegated

Nordmøre og Romsdal

1. Tomrefjord – lost playoff
2. Kristiansund 2
3. Sunndal
4. Surnadal
5. Åndalsnes
6. Dahle
7. Malmefjorden
8. Eide og Omegn
9. Vestnes Varfjell
10. Kristiansund FK/Clausenengen
11. Midsund
12. Smøla – relegated

Trøndelag 1

1. Levanger 2 – lost playoff
2. Verdal
3. Byåsen 2
4. Sverresborg
5. Namsos
6. Åfjord – relegated

Trøndelag 2

1. Steinkjer – promoted
2. Vuku
3. Rørvik
4. Charlottenlund
5. Heimdal/Kattem
6. Ranheim 3 – relegated

Trøndelag 3

1. Trygg/Lade – promoted
2. Nardo 2
3. NTNUI 2 – relegated
4. KIL/Hemne
5. Svorkmo
6. Fram – relegated

Trøndelag 4

1. Kvik – lost playoff
2. Buvik
3. Stjørdals-Blink 2
4. Hitra
5. Orkla 2
6. Rennebu – relegated

Nordland

1. Innstranda – promoted
2. Mosjøen
3. Grand Bodø
4. Sandnessjøen
5. Fauske/Sprint
6. Junkeren 2/Bodø/Glimt 3 – split after season
7. Saltdalkameratene – relegated
8. Rana 2
9. Røst – relegated
10. Bossmo & Ytteren

Hålogaland

1. Harstad – promoted
2. Sortland
3. Landsås
4. Ballstad
5. Lofoten
6. Medkila
7. Andenes
8. Melbo 2 – relegated
9. Leknes

Troms

1. Krokelvdalen – lost playoff
2. Skarp
3. Tromsdalen 2
4. Valhall
5. Ishavsbyen
6. Storelva
7. Salangen
8. Kvaløya
9. Bardufoss og Omegn – relegated
10. Lyngen/Karnes
11. Stakkevollan – relegated
12. Finnsnes 2 – relegated

Finnmark

1. Bossekop – promoted
2. HIF/Stein
3. Alta 2
4. Porsanger
5. Norild
6. Kirkenes
7. Sørøy Glimt
8. Nordlys
9. Bjørnevatn – relegated

- Rafsbotn – pulled team

== Playoffs ==
- Sprint-Jeløy beat Sandefjord 2.
- Lillehammer beat Engerdal.
- Urædd beat Vestfossen.
- Randesund beat Søgne.
- Frøya and Bremnes beat Bergen Nord and Lyngbø.
- Hødd 2 beat Tomrefjord.
- Trygg/Lade and Steinkjer beat Levanger 2 and Kvik.
- Harstad beat Innstranda.
- Bossekop beat Krokelvdalen.
- Innstranda beat Krokelvdalen.
