= 2010 Norwegian Third Division =

Norwegian football league season

The 2010 season of the 3. divisjon, the fourth highest association football league for men in Norway.

Between 22 and 26 games (depending on group size) were played in 24 groups, with 3 points given for wins and 1 for draws. Twelve teams were promoted to the 2. divisjon through playoffs.

Unusually many teams were relegated this season, since the 3. divisjon was streamlined to only 12 groups beginning in 2011.

== Tables ==
Oslo 1

1. Nesodden – won playoff
2. Bærum 2
3. Jutul
4. Asker 2
5. Holmlia
6. Lommedalen
7. Hauger – relegated
8. Sagene – relegated
9. Frognerparken – relegated
10. Langhus – relegated
11. Klemetsrud – relegated
- Lyn 2 – pulled team

Oslo 2

1. Korsvoll – lost playoff
2. Bøler
3. Røa
4. Kjelsås 2
5. Nordstrand
6. Manglerud Star 2
7. Fagerborg – relegated
8. Oldenborg – relegated
9. KFUM 2 – relegated
10. Bygdø Monolitten – relegated
11. Oppsal – relegated
- Øvrevoll Hosle – pulled team

Oslo 3

1. Hasle-Løren – won playoff
2. Grorud
3. Ullern
4. Vestli
5. Follo 2
6. Frigg 2
7. Skeid 2 – relegated
8. Grüner – relegated
9. Årvoll – relegated
10. Rommen – relegated
11. Huk – relegated
12. Kolbotn – relegated

Akershus

1. Lillestrøm 2 – lost playoff
2. Lørenskog 2
3. Strømmen 2
4. Høland
5. Fjellhamar
6. Skedsmo
7. Funnefoss/Vormsund
8. Skjetten – relegated
9. Hauerseter – relegated
10. Sørumsand – relegated
11. Gjelleråsen – relegated
12. Åkrene – relegated
13. Gjerdrum – relegated
14. Rælingen – relegated

Indre Østland 1

1. Gjøvik FF – lost playoff
2. Ottestad
3. Ham-Kam 2
4. Kolbu/KK
5. Nordre Land
6. Stange
7. Raufoss 2 – relegated
8. Redalen – relegated
9. Gran – relegated
10. Valdres 2 – relegated
11. Søndre Land – relegated
12. Vind – relegated

Indre Østland 2

1. Elverum – won playoff
2. Flisa
3. Moelven
4. Nybergsund 2
5. Kongsvinger 2
6. Eidskog
7. Lillehammer 2 – relegated
8. Sander – relegated
9. Follebu – relegated
10. Hamar – relegated
11. Ringsaker – relegated
12. Løten – relegated

Buskerud

1. Jevnaker – won playoff
2. Birkebeineren
3. Hønefoss 2
4. Kongsberg
5. Mjøndalen 2
6. Modum
7. Drammen – relegated
8. Vestfossen – relegated
9. Åssiden – relegated
10. Konnerud – relegated
11. Svelvik – relegated
12. ROS – relegated

Østfold

1. Kvik Halden – won playoff
2. Sprint-Jeløy
3. Drøbak/Frogn
4. Fredrikstad 2
5. Østsiden
6. Trosvik
7. Askim – relegated
8. Mysen – relegated
9. Moss 2 – relegated
10. Sarpsborg 2 – relegated
11. Rakkestad – relegated
12. Borgar – relegated
13. Trøgstad/Båstad – relegated
14. Selbak – relegated

Vestfold

1. Sandefjord 2
2. Eik-Tønsberg – lost playoff
3. Larvik Turn
4. Tønsberg FK
5. Flint
6. FK Tønsberg 2
7. Runar – relegated
8. Husøy & Foynland – relegated
9. Fram Larvik 2 – relegated
10. Falk – relegated
11. Nøtterøy – relegated
- Sandar – pulled team

Telemark

1. Skarphedin – lost playoff
2. Herkules
3. Notodden 2
4. Tollnes
5. Pors Grenland 2
6. Urædd
7. Odd 3
8. Ulefoss – relegated
9. Kjapp – relegated
10. Gvarv – relegated
11. Stathelle og Omegn – relegated
12. Sannidal – relegated
13. Brevik – relegated
14. Skotfoss – relegated

Agder

1. Mandalskameratene – won playoff
2. Jerv
3. Trauma (-> Arendal Fotball)
4. Lyngdal
5. Flekkefjord
6. Søgne
7. Grane (-> Arendal Fotball)
8. Giv Akt – relegated
9. Våg – relegated
10. Gimletroll – relegated
11. Birkenes – relegated
12. Donn – relegated
13. Randesund – relegated
14. Farsund – relegated

Rogaland 1

1. Viking 2 – won playoff
2. Egersund
3. Klepp
4. Bryne 2
5. Hinna
6. Vardeneset
7. Vaulen – relegated
8. Hana – relegated
9. Frøyland – relegated
10. Eiger – relegated
11. Havørn – relegated
12. Ålgård 2 – relegated
13. Varhaug – relegated
14. Riska – relegated

Rogaland 2

1. Staal Jørpeland – lost playoff
2. Sola
3. Haugesund 2
4. Sandnes Ulf 2
5. Brodd
6. Åkra
7. Skjold
8. Vedavåg Karmøy – relegated
9. Randaberg 2 – relegated
10. Avaldsnes – relegated
11. Stavanger 2 – relegated
12. Sandved – relegated
13. Buøy – relegated
- Nord – pulled team

Hordaland 1

1. Austevoll – won playoff
2. Sotra
3. Tertnes
4. Løv-Ham 2
5. Bjarg
6. Askøy
7. Varegg – relegated
8. Hovding – relegated
9. Vestsiden-Askøy – relegated
10. Nordhordland – relegated
11. Lyngbø – relegated
12. Hald – relegated

Hordaland 2

1. Voss – lost playoff
2. Fyllingen
3. Arna-Bjørnar
4. Brann 2
5. Øystese
6. Os 2 – relegated
7. Odda – relegated
8. Baune – relegated
9. Vadmyra – relegated
10. Smørås – relegated
11. Norheimsund – relegated
12. Bergen Nord – relegated

Sogn og Fjordane

1. Tornado Måløy – lost playoff
2. Stryn
3. Eid
4. Årdal
5. Fjøra
6. Florø
7. Dale – relegated
8. Sogndal 2 – relegated
9. Sandane – relegated
10. Vik – relegated
11. Jølster – relegated
12. Høyang – relegated

Sunnmøre

1. Herd – won playoff
2. Bergsøy
3. Volda
4. Hødd 2
5. Brattvåg
6. Stranda
7. Hareid – relegated
8. Valder – relegated
9. Rollon – relegated
10. Norborg – relegated
11. Spjelkavik – relegated
12. Godøy – relegated

Nordmøre og Romsdal

1. Sunndal – lost playoff
2. Træff
3. Averøykameratene
4. Elnesvågen/Omegn
5. Surnadal
6. Eidsvåg
7. Kristiansund FK – relegated
8. Dahle – relegated
9. Kristiansund 2 – relegated
10. Rival – relegated
11. Molde 3 – relegated
12. Åndalsnes – relegated

Trøndelag 1

1. Tiller – won playoff
2. Buvik
3. KIL/Hemne
4. Frøya
5. Strindheim 2
6. Charlottenlund
7. Tynset – relegated
8. Kattem – relegated
9. Heimdal – relegated
10. Røros – relegated
11. Byåsen 2 – relegated
12. Orkla – relegated

Trøndelag 2

1. Stjørdals-Blink – lost playoff
2. NTNUI
3. Rosenborg 3
4. Vuku
5. Namsos
6. Verdal
7. Tangmoen – relegated
8. Malvik – relegated
9. Remyra – relegated
10. Neset – relegated
11. Steinkjer 2 – relegated
12. Selbu – relegated

Nordland

1. Stålkameratene – lost playoff
2. Bodø/Glimt 2
3. Innstranden
4. Sandnessjøen
5. Mosjøen
6. Fauske/Sprint – relegated
7. Steigen – relegated
8. Tverlandet – relegated
9. Brønnøysund – relegated
10. Herøy/Dønna – relegated
11. Meløy – relegated
12. Grand Bodø – relegated

Hålogaland

1. Mjølner – won playoff
2. Sortland
3. Morild
4. Lofoten
5. Landsås
6. Skånland – relegated
7. Medkila – relegated
8. Grovfjord – relegated
9. Hardhaus – relegated
10. Melbo – relegated
11. Ballstad – relegated
12. Leknes – relegated

Troms

1. Skarp – won playoff
2. Lyngen/Karnes
3. Fløya
4. Salangen
5. Finnsnes
6. Tromsdalen 2
7. Ishavsbyen
8. Senja 2 – relegated
9. Skjervøy – relegated
10. Tromsø 3 – relegated
11. Bardufoss og Omegn – relegated
12. Laksvatn – relegated

Finnmark

1. Kirkenes – lost playoff
2. Bossekop
3. Porsanger
4. Hammerfest
5. Norild
6. Tverrelvdalen – relegated
7. Sørøy/Glimt – relegated
8. Alta 2 – relegated
9. Nordkinn – relegated
10. Honningsvåg – relegated
11. Kautokeino – relegated
12. Bjørnevatn – relegated
