= 2008 Norwegian Third Division =

Norwegian football league season

The 2008 season of the 3. divisjon, the fourth highest association football league for men in Norway.

Between 18 and 26 games (depending on group size) were played in 24 groups, with 3 points given for wins and 1 for draws. Twelve teams were promoted to the 2. divisjon through playoff.

== Tables ==
Oslo 1

1. Oslo City – lost playoff
2. Skeid 2
3. Årvoll
4. Grei
5. Sagene
6. Bærum 2
7. Grüner
8. Jutul
9. Røa
10. Lille Tøyen
11. Fagerborg – relegated
12. Manglerud Star 2 – relegated

Oslo 2

1. Ullern – won playoff
2. Frigg
3. Hasle-Løren
4. Nordstrand
5. Vestli
6. Asker 2
7. Kolbotn
8. Follo 2
9. Langhus
10. Kurer
11. Lommedalen
12. Heming – relegated

Oslo 3

1. KFUM – won playoff
2. Nesodden
3. Bygdø Monolitten
4. Grorud
5. Kjelsås 2
6. Bøler
7. Øvrevoll Hosle
8. Korsvoll 2
9. Holmen
10. Vollen
11. Rommen
12. Klemetsrud – relegated

Akershus

1. Høland – lost playoff
2. Skedsmo
3. Aurskog/Finstadbru
4. Funnefoss/Vormsund
5. Lørenskog 2
6. Fet
7. Eidsvold
8. Ull/Kisa 2
9. Sørumsand
10. Fjellhamar
11. Strømmen 2
12. Eidsvold Turn 2 – relegated
13. Bjerke – relegated
14. Lillestrøm 3 – relegated

Indre Østland 1

1. FF Lillehammer – won playoff
2. Brumunddal
3. Redalen
4. Moelven
5. Ringsaker
6. Toten
7. Follebu
8. Hadeland
9. Raufoss 2
10. Kolbu/KK
11. Otta – relegated
12. Hamar – relegated

Indre Østland 2

1. Flisa – lost playoff
2. Ham-Kam 2
3. Elverum
4. Sander
5. Nordre Land
6. Gjøvik-Lyn (-> Gjøvik FF)
7. Vardal (-> Gjøvik FF)
8. Kongsvinger 2
9. Løten
10. Fart
11. Stange – relegated
12. Østre Trysil – relegated

Buskerud

1. Åskollen – won playoff
2. Kongsberg
3. Konnerud
4. Birkebeineren
5. Åssiden
6. Mjøndalen 2
7. Svelvik
8. Jevnaker
9. Vestfossen
10. Solberg
11. Hønefoss BK 2 – relegated
12. Slemmestad – relegated

Østfold

1. Kvik/Halden – lost playoff
2. Mysen
3. Sarpsborg 2
4. Lisleby
5. Askim
6. Moss 2
7. Ås
8. Selbak
9. Sprint-Jeløy
10. Rygge
11. Trøgstad/Båstad
12. Borgar – relegated
13. Greåker – relegated
14. Hærland – relegated

Vestfold

1. Fram Larvik – won playoff
2. Larvik Turn
3. Ørn-Horten
4. Eik-Tønsberg
5. FK Tønsberg 2
6. Sandefjord 2
7. Tønsberg FK
8. Sandar
9. Flint
10. Falk
11. Svarstad
12. Sem – relegated

Telemark

1. Odd Grenland 2 – lost playoff
2. Skarphedin
3. Herkules
4. Urædd
5. Ulefoss
6. Notodden 2
7. Tollnes
8. Langesund/Stathelle (-> Stathelle o. Om.)
9. Brevik
10. Sannidal
11. Pors Grenland 2
12. Skotfoss
13. Kjapp
14. Gulset – relegated

Agder

1. Start 2 – won playoff
2. Jerv
3. Trauma
4. Lyngdal
5. Søgne
6. Donn
7. Birkenes
8. Giv Akt
9. Farsund
10. Vigør
11. Tveit
12. Våg
13. Mandalskameratene 2
- FK Arendal – pulled team

Rogaland 1

1. Klepp – lost playoff
2. Vidar
3. Randaberg 2
4. Sandnes Ulf 2
5. Staal Jørpeland
6. Egersund
7. Vaulen
8. Frøyland
9. Buøy
10. Ålgård 2
11. Brodd
12. Sandved
13. Sola – relegated
14. Nærbø – relegated

Rogaland 2

1. Kopervik – won playoff
2. Skjold
3. Haugesund 2
4. Havørn
5. Avaldsnes
6. Bryne 2
7. Åkra
8. Vedavåg Karmøy
9. Vardeneset
10. Nord
11. Djerv 1919
12. Austrått
13. Ganddal – relegated
14. Vard Haugesund 2 – relegated

Hordaland 1

1. Brann 2 – lost playoff
2. Austevoll
3. Hovding
4. Vadmyra
5. Lyngbø
6. Tertnes
7. Askøy
8. Follese
9. Djerv
10. Norheimsund
11. Øygard – relegated
12. Loddefjord – relegated

Hordaland 2

1. Stord – won playoff
2. Voss
3. Baune
4. Odda
5. Hald
6. Trio
7. Bergen Nord
8. Sandviken
9. Nordhordland
10. Arna-Bjørnar
11. Varegg – relegated
12. Frøya – relegated

Sogn og Fjordane

1. Førde – lost playoff
2. Årdal
3. Sogndal 2
4. Fjøra
5. Tornado Måløy
6. Stryn
7. Florø
8. Kaupanger
9. Høyang
10. Eid
11. Skavøypoll – relegated
12. Selje – relegated

Sunnmøre

1. Aalesund 2 – lost playoff
2. Hødd 2
3. Brattvåg
4. Volda
5. Godøy
6. Hareid
7. Valder
8. Langevåg
9. Rollon
10. Spjelkavik
11. Blindheim – relegated
12. Sykkylven – relegated

Nordmøre og Romsdal

1. Molde 2 – won playoff
2. Træff
3. Elnesvågen/Omegn
4. Sunndal
5. Dahle
6. Surnadal
7. Eidsvåg
8. Rival
9. Kristiansund 2
10. Averøykameratene
11. Måndalen
12. Bryn – relegated

Trøndelag 1

1. Tiller – lost playoff
2. Kattem
3. Kolstad
4. Ranheim 2
5. Heimdal
6. Tynset
7. Byåsen 2
8. Melhus
9. Strindheim 2
10. Orkla
11. Nationalkameratene – relegated
12. Flå – relegated

Trøndelag 2

1. Nardo – won playoff
2. Verdal
3. NTNUI
4. Namsos
5. Rosenborg 3
6. Nidelv
7. Steinkjer 2
8. Neset
9. Vuku
10. Stjørdals-Blink
11. Levanger 2 – relegated
12. Rissa – relegated

Nordland

1. Bodø/Glimt 2 – won playoff
2. Stålkameratene
3. Steigen
4. Fauske/Sprint
5. Innstranden
6. Mosjøen
7. Tverlandet
8. Herøy/Dønna
9. Sandnessjøen
10. Mo 2 – relegated
11. Meløy
12. Bossmo/Ytteren – relegated

Hålogaland

1. Harstad – lost playoff
2. Mjølner
3. Grovfjord
4. Sortland
5. Landsås
6. Skånland
7. Medkila
8. Leknes
9. Hardhaus
10. Svolvær – relegated

Troms

1. Skjervøy – lost playoff
2. Finnsnes
3. Lyngen/Karnes
4. Fløya
5. Tromsdalen 2
6. Salangen
7. Ishavsbyen
8. Nordreisa
9. Kvaløysletta – relegated
10. Skognes – relegated
11. Ramfjord – relegated

Finnmark

1. Bossekop – won playoff
2. Porsanger
3. Alta 2
4. Hammerfest
5. Sørøy/Glimt
6. Kirkenes
7. Bjørnevatn
8. Båtsfjord – relegated
9. Tverrelvdalen
10. Kautokeino
11. Norild
12. Nordlys – relegated
