= 2024 Norwegian Fourth Division =

4. divisjon
- Season: 2024
- Promoted: 18 teams

The 2024 season of the 4. divisjon, the fifth highest association football league for men in Norway.

For the first time since COVID-19 interrupted the league, all districts employed a regular round-robin tournament, with Nordland being the last to revert from a regular/playoff format.

== Teams ==
Østfold

1. Drøbak-Frogn – won playoff
2. Råde
3. Sarpsborg
4. Kråkerøy
5. Sparta Sarpsborg
6. Moss 2
7. Lisleby
8. Ås
9. Østsiden
10. Selbak
11. Askim
12. Borgen
13. Greåker – relegated
14. Sprint-Jeløy 2 – relegated

Oslo 1

1. Lyn 2 – promoted
2. Holmlia
3. Christiania
4. Union Carl Berner
5. Bærum 2
6. Manglerud Star
7. Grüner
8. Oppsal 2
9. Ullern 2
10. Nordstrand 2
11. Bærums Verk Hauger – relegated
12. Oslojuvelene – relegated

Oslo 2

1. Grei – promoted
2. Heming
3. Grorud 2
4. Kjelsås 2
5. Follo 2
6. Asker 2
7. Lokomotiv Oslo 2
8. Årvoll
9. Bøler
10. Lambertseter
11. Stovner
12. Lommedalen – relegated

Akershus

1. Ull/Kisa 2 – promoted
2. Hauerseter
3. Eidsvold
4. Strømmen 2
5. Kløfta
6. Raumnes & Årnes
7. Rælingen
8. Eidsvold Turn 2
9. Sørumsand
10. Lørenskog 2
11. Fjellhamar
12. Løvenstad
13. Skjetten 2 – relegated
14. Blaker – relegated

Indre Østland

1. Lillehammer - promoted
2. Brumunddal
3. Kolbukameratene
4. Raufoss 2
5. Skreia
6. Nybergsund
7. Ridabu
8. Toten
9. Gran – withdrew post-season
10. Ottestad
11. Flisa
12. Gjøvik-Lyn 2
13. Valdres – withdrew post-season
14. Faaberg – relegated

Buskerud

1. Vestfossen – lost playoff
2. Hallingdal
3. Konnerud
4. Drammens BK
5. Graabein
6. Modum
7. Jevnaker
8. Stoppen
9. Eiker/Kvikk
10. Hokksund
11. Sande – relegated
12. Kongsberg – relegated
13. Slemmestad – relegated

- Svelvik – pulled team

Vestfold

1. Åsgårdstrand – lost playoff
2. Halsen – withdrew post-season
3. Teie
4. Eik Tønsberg 2
5. Store Bergan
6. Ørn-Horten 2
7. Nøtterøy
8. Runar
9. Sandefjord BK
10. Sandar
11. Stag – relegated
12. Re

Telemark

1. Pors 2 – won playoff
2. Urædd
3. Hei
4. Odd 3
5. Eidanger
6. Storm
7. Notodden 2
8. Stathelle/Langesund
9. Gulset
10. Skarphedin
11. Tollnes

- Herkules – pulled team

Agder

1. Våg – promoted
2. Donn
3. Randesund
4. Flekkefjord
5. Søgne
6. Express
7. Trauma
8. Jerv 2
9. Giv Akt
10. Vindbjart 2
11. Tigerberget – relegated
12. Lyngdal – relegated
13. Froland – relegated
14. Birkenes – relegated

Rogaland 1

1. Hinna - promoted
2. Vardeneset
3. Ålgård
4. Forus og Gausel
5. Eiger
6. Hana
7. Vidar 2
8. Randaberg
9. Ganddal
10. Sandved
11. Vaulen

- Egersund 2 – pulled team

Rogaland 2

1. Torvastad – promoted
2. Åkra
3. Rosseland
4. Frøyland
5. Varhaug
6. Nord
7. Bryne 2
8. Vard Haugesund 2
9. Kopervik
10. Avaldsnes
11. Stavanger
12. Kåsen – relegated

Hordaland 1

1. Gneist − promoted
2. Arna-Bjørnar
3. Austevoll
4. NHHI
5. Flaktveit
6. Osterøy
7. Voss
8. Sund
9. Nordhordland
10. Askøy 2
11. Tertnes – relegated
12. Bergen Nord – relegated

Hordaland 2

1. Lyngbø – promoted
2. Varegg
3. Djerv
4. Bremnes
5. Trane – merged into Bergensdalen
6. Nymark
7. Mathopen
8. Smørås
9. Os 2
10. Fana 2
11. Trio – relegated
12. Odda – relegated

Sogn og Fjordane

1. Fjøra − promoted
2. Sogndal 2
3. Eid
4. Høyang
5. Førde 2
6. Dale
7. Sandane
8. Jølster
9. Stryn
10. Vik – relegated
11. Måløy – relegated

- Studentspretten – pulled team

Sunnmøre

1. Volda – won playoff
2. Rollon
3. Herd
4. Stordal/Ørskog
5. Ørsta
6. Bergsøy
7. Hareid
8. Hovdebygda
9. SIF/Hessa
10. Langevåg
11. Aksla – relegated
12. Stranda – relegated

Nordmøre og Romsdal

1. Åndalsnes – lost playoff
2. Træff 2
3. Midsund
4. Elnesvågen og Omegn
5. Dahle
6. Eide og Omegn
7. Clausenengen
8. Sunndal
9. Malmefjorden
10. Averøykameratene
11. Vestnes Varfjell
12. Tomrefjord – relegated

Trøndelag 1

1. Kvik − promoted
2. Sverresborg
3. Vuku
4. Stjørdals-Blink 2
5. Rørvik
6. Steinkjer
7. Strindheim 2
8. Levanger 2
9. Nationalkameratene
10. Lånke
11. Flatanger – relegated
12. Tangmoen – relegated

Trøndelag 2

1. Ranheim 2 − promoted
2. NTNUI
3. Tynset
4. Hitra
5. KIL/Hemne
6. Rindal
7. Trønder-Lyn
8. Alvdal – withdrew post-season
9. Kolstad
10. Heimdal
11. Tiller 2
12. Nidelv – relegated

Nordland

1. Rana 2
2. Fauske/Sprint − lost playoff
3. Sandnessjøen
4. Grand Bodø
5. Brønnøysund
6. Bossmo & Ytteren
7. Junkeren 2
8. Mosjøen 2 – relegated

- Hulløy Bodø – pulled team

Hålogaland

1. Sortland − won playoff
2. Melbo
3. Skånland
4. Landsås
5. Lofoten
6. Morild – withdrew post-season
7. Harstad 2
8. Leknes
9. Svolvær
10. Medkila

- Stokmarknes – pulled team

Troms

1. Tromsø 2 − won playoff
2. Finnsnes
3. Skarp
4. Hamna
5. Tromsdalen 2
6. Senja
7. Nordreisa
8. Krokelvdalen
9. Kvaløya
10. Lyngen/Karnes
11. Salangen

- Storelva – pulled team

Finnmark

1. Alta 2 − won playoff
2. Bossekop
3. Kirkenes
4. Bjørnevatn
5. Norild
6. Indrefjord
7. Nordlys
8. HIF/Stein
9. Porsanger

== Playoffs ==
- Drøbak-Frogn beat Åsgårdstrand.
- Pors 2 beat Vestfossen
- Volda beat Åndalsnes.
- Sortland beat Fauske/Sprint.
- Tromsø 2 beat Alta 2.
- Alta 2 beat Fauske/Sprint.
