= 1993 Norwegian Third Division =

Norwegian football league season

The 1993 season of the 3. divisjon, the fourth highest association football league for men in Norway.

Between 22 and 24 games (depending on group size) were played in 19 groups, with 3 points given for wins and 1 for draws. All group winners were promoted to the 2. divisjon, as well as some of the best runners-up.

== Tables ==
Group 1

1. Holter – promoted
2. Torp
3. Lisleby
4. Nes
5. Kvik Halden
6. Østsiden
7. Ull-Kisa
8. Trøgstad/Båstad
9. Eidskog
10. Kjellmyra – relegated
11. Askim – relegated
12. Flisa – relegated

Group 2

1. Sarpsborg – promoted
2. Rælingen
3. Nordstrand
4. Greåker
5. Rakkestad
6. Stovnerkameratene
7. Tune
8. Kløfta
9. Hafslund
10. Borgen – relegated
11. KFUM Oslo – relegated
12. Manglerud Star – relegated

Group 3

1. Aurskog-Finstadbru – promoted
2. Raufoss
3. Høland
4. Gjøvik-Lyn
5. Skjetten
6. Nordre Land
7. Bjørkelangen
8. Gjelleråsen
9. Gran
10. Skreia – relegated
11. Kapp – relegated
12. Oppsal – relegated

Group 4

1. Faaberg – promoted
2. Lillehammer FK
3. Ham-Kam 2
4. Biri
5. Brumunddal
6. Sel
7. Ottestad
8. Stange
9. Vang
10. Lom – relegated
11. Kvam – relegated
12. Moelven – relegated

Group 5

1. Fossum – promoted
2. Årvoll
3. Liv/Fossekallen
4. Drafn
5. Snøgg
6. Teie
7. Urædd
8. Solberg
9. Drammens BK – relegated
10. Tollnes – relegated
11. Tønsberg FK – relegated
12. Slagen – relegated

Group 6

1. Holmen – promoted
2. Tjølling
3. Mjøndalen 2 – relegated
4. Holmestrand
5. Slemmestad
6. Steinberg
7. Skotfoss
8. Gulset
9. Bygdø
10. Asker – relegated
11. Storm – relegated
12. ROS – relegated

Group 7

1. Mandalskameratene – promoted
2. Kvinesdal
3. Larvik Turn
4. Øyestad
5. Gjekstad & Østerøya
6. Vigør
7. Langesund
8. Vindbjart
9. Sørfjell
10. Hei – relegated
11. Grane – relegated
12. Greipstad – relegated

Group 8

1. Hana – promoted
2. Randaberg
3. Figgjo
4. Eiger
5. Sola
6. Staal
7. Varhaug
8. Nærbø
9. Vardeneset
10. Voll – relegated
11. Sunde – relegated
12. Bjerkreim – relegated

Group 9

1. Kopervik – promoted
2. Åkra
3. Nord
4. Skjold
5. Nest
6. Solid
7. Bremnes
8. Hardy
9. Trott
10. Øygard – relegated
11. Trio – relegated
12. Avaldsnes – relegated

Group 10

1. Bjørnar – promoted
2. Lyngbø
3. Nymark
4. Telavåg
5. Hovding
6. Radøy
7. Varegg
8. Follese
9. Vadmyra
10. Voss – relegated
11. Bergen Nord – relegated
12. Fyllingen – relegated

Group 11

1. Florø – promoted
2. Eikefjord
3. Stryn
4. Høyang
5. Førde
6. Eid
7. Tempo
8. Fjøra
9. Tornado
10. Jotun
11. Sandane – relegated
12. Vikane – relegated

Group 12

1. Langevåg – promoted
2. Skarbøvik
3. Brattvåg
4. Sykkylven
5. Hessa
6. Åram
7. Stranda
8. Stordal
9. Valder
10. Skodje
11. Hareid
12. Hovdebygda – relegated

Group 13

1. Clausenengen – promoted
2. Kristiansund
3. Molde 2
4. Bryn
5. Rival
6. Tomrefjord
7. Isfjorden
8. Moldekameratene
9. Træff
10. Batnfjord – relegated
11. Gossen – relegated
12. Kvass – relegated

Group 14

1. Tynset – promoted
2. NTHI
3. Fosen
4. Orkanger
5. Ørland
6. Alvdal
7. Sverresborg
8. KIL/Hemne
9. Rissa
10. Vanvik – relegated
11. Kvik – relegated
12. Fevåg – relegated

Group 15

1. Verdal – promoted
2. Ranheim
3. Vinne
4. Freidig
5. Vuku
6. Nationalkameratene
7. Fram
8. Henning
9. Sverre
10. Utleira – relegated
11. Skogn – relegated
12. Sparbu – relegated

Group 16

1. Mo/Bossmo – promoted
2. Grand Bodø
3. Mosjøen
4. Åga
5. Olderskog
6. Saltdalkameratene
7. Brønnøysund
8. Sandnesssjøen
9. Halsakameratene
10. Sørfold
11. Korgen – relegated
12. Meløy – relegated

Group 17

1. Narvik/Nor – promoted
2. Kvæfjord
3. Vågakameratene
4. Lofoten
5. Ajaks
6. Landsås
7. Morild
8. Stokmarknes
9. Andenes
10. Luna
11. Beisfjord
12. Kabelvåg – relegated

Group 18

1. Silsand – promoted
2. Finnsnes
3. Skjervøy
4. Salangen
5. Tromsdalen 2
6. Ramfjord
7. Ulfstind
8. Fløya
9. Kåfjord
10. Ullsfjord
11. Kvaløysletta
12. Ringvassøy
13. Storsteinnes – relegated

Group 19

1. Norild – promoted
2. Bjørnevatn
3. Nordlys
4. Lakselv
5. HIF/Stein
6. Nordkinn
7. Bølgen
8. Indrefjord
9. Vardø
10. Kautokeino – relegated
11. Tverrelvdalen – relegated
12. Øksfjord – relegated
