= 2006 Norwegian Third Division =

2006 season of Norwegian football league

The 2006 season of the 3. divisjon, the fourth-highest association football league for men in Norway.

Between 20 and 22 games (depending on group size) were played in 24 groups, with 3 points given for wins and 1 for draws. Twelve teams were promoted to the 2. divisjon through playoff.

There was a redesigning of the 3. divisjon to better fit geographical boundaries next season. Fewer teams than usual were relegated; purposely none from the Oslo district and none from Agder.

== Tables ==
Group 1

1. Fredrikstad 2 – won playoff
2. Lisleby
3. KFUM
4. Follo 2
5. Klemetsrud
6. Sparta Sarpsborg 2
7. St. Hanshaugen
8. Østsiden
9. Greåker
10. Trøgstad/Båstad
11. Gresvik
12. Selbak – relegated

Group 2

1. Kvik/Halden – lost playoff
2. Moss 2
3. Kolbotn
4. Ås
5. Årvoll
6. Rygge
7. Hærland
8. Sprint-Jeløy 2
9. Grei
10. Nesodden
11. Råde – relegated
12. Andes

Group 3

1. Ullern – lost playoff
2. Skjetten
3. Lyn 2
4. Frigg
5. Fagerborg
6. Bygdø Monolitten
7. Fjellhamar
8. Bjørkelangen
9. Høland
10. Bærum 2
11. Røa
12. Bøler

Group 4

1. Strømmen – won playoff
2. Kongsvinger 2
3. Aurskog/Finstadbru
4. Grorud
5. Blaker
6. Nordstrand
7. Sander
8. Vestli
9. Galterud
10. Funnefoss/Vormsund
11. Lillestrøm 3
12. Fet

Group 5

1. Elverum – lost playoff
2. Skeid 2
3. Hamar
4. Eidsvold
5. Flisa
6. Trysil
7. Bjerke
8. Løten
9. Rommen
10. Kjelsås 2
11. Fart – relegated
12. Vang – relegated

Group 6

1. FF Lillehammer – won playoff
2. Vardal
3. Ringebu/Fåvang
4. Ringsaker
5. Furnes – relegated (voluntarily)
6. SAFK Fagernes (-> Valdres)
7. Gjøvik-Lyn 2
8. Redalen
9. Stange
10. Ottestad – relegated
11. Lom – relegated
12. Vågå – relegated

Group 7

1. Mjøndalen – won playoff
2. Kongsberg
3. Jevnaker
4. Hønefoss BK 2
5. Birkebeineren
6. Raufoss 2
7. Ihle
8. Kolbu/KK
9. Toten
10. Hadeland
11. Hønefoss SK – relegated
- Norderhov – relegated

Group 8

1. Asker – won playoff
2. Åssiden
3. Konnerud
4. Åskollen
5. Strømsgodset 2
6. Hauger
7. Solberg
8. Svelvik
9. Vollen
10. Øvrevoll/Hosle
11. Holmestrand – relegated
12. Fossum

Group 9

1. Sandefjord 2 – lost playoff
2. Eik-Tønsberg
3. Runar
4. Larvik Turn
5. Sandar
6. Tønsberg FK
7. Flint
8. Fram Larvik
9. Borre
10. Sem – relegated
11. Ivrig – relegated
12. Tjølling – relegated

Group 10

1. Pors Grenland 2
2. Urædd – lost playoff
3. Grane
4. Stathelle
5. Tollnes
6. Notodden 2
7. Skarphedin
8. Skotfoss
9. Herkules
10. Brevik
11. Gvarv
12. Odd Grenland 3 – relegated

Group 11

1. FK Arendal – won playoff
2. Vigør
3. Vindbjart
4. Trauma
5. Søgne
6. Lyngdal
7. Tveit
8. Flekkefjord
9. Donn
10. Jerv
11. Mandalskameratene 2
12. Våg

Group 12

1. Vidar – lost playoff
2. Vardeneset
3. Egersund
4. Sandnes Ulf 2
5. Varhaug
6. Staal Jørpeland
7. Sandved
8. Frøyland
9. Bryne 2
10. Ganddal
11. Bjerkreim
12. Havørn – relegated

Group 13

1. Stavanger – won playoff
2. Randaberg
3. Buøy
4. Haugesund 2
5. Skjold
6. Ålgård 2
7. Avaldsnes
8. Nord
9. Vaulen
10. Åkra
11. Vard Haugesund 2
12. Vedavåg Karmøy

Group 14

1. Os – won playoff
2. Arna-Bjørnar
3. Radøy/Manger
4. Frøya
5. Trio
6. Sandviken
7. Brann 2
8. Bergen Nord
9. Ny-Krohnborg
10. Hald
11. Stord Sunnhordland 2 – relegated
12. Solid – relegated

Group 15

1. Hovding – lost playoff
2. Nest-Sotra
3. Voss
4. Follese
5. Austevoll
6. Lyngbø
7. Norheimsund
8. Loddefjord
9. Vadmyra
10. Øygard
11. Løv-Ham 2 – relegated
12. Gneist – relegated

Group 16

1. Stryn – lost playoff
2. Førde
3. Sogndal 2
4. Tornado Måløy
5. Fjøra
6. Høyang
7. Kaupanger
8. Dale
9. Eid
10. Skavøypoll – relegated
11. Selje – relegated
12. Sandane – relegated

Group 17

1. Skarbøvik – lost playoff
2. Sykkylven
3. Hareid
4. Langevåg
5. Hødd 2
6. Spjelkavik
7. Aalesund 2
8. Volda
9. Ørsta
10. Valder
11. Rollon – relegated
12. Bergsøy – relegated

Group 18

1. Averøykameratene – won playoff
2. Træff
3. Elnesvågen/Omegn
4. Surnadal
5. Sunndal
6. Gossen – relegated (voluntarily)
7. Dahle
8. Kristiansund 2
9. Midsund
10. Rival
11. Eide og Omegn – relegated
12. Bryn – relegated

Group 19

1. Nardo – won playoff
2. Orkla
3. Tynset
4. Buvik
5. Tiller
6. Nidelv
7. Strindheim 2
8. Malvik
9. Flå
10. Selbu – relegated
11. Kvik – relegated
12. Meldal – relegated

Group 20

1. Verdal – lost playoff
2. Stjørdals-Blink
3. Rørvik
4. Vuku
5. NTNUI
6. Rosenborg 3
7. Charlottenlund
8. Namsos
9. Rissa
10. Levanger 2
11. Bjørgan – relegated
12. Fram – relegated

Group 21

1. Fauske/Sprint – lost playoff
2. Innstranden
3. Mosjøen
4. Bodø/Glimt 2
5. Herøy/Dønna
6. Mo 2
7. Stålkameratene
8. Bossmo/Ytteren
9. Brønnøysund
10. Meløy – relegated
11. Junkeren – relegated
12. Drag – relegated

Group 22

1. Mjølner – won playoff
2. Lofoten
3. Grovfjord
4. Landsås
5. Ballangen – relegated (voluntarily)
6. Harstad 2
7. Skånland
8. Morild
9. Sortland
10. Medkila
11. Andenes – relegated (voluntarily)
12. Leknes

Group 23

1. Tromsø 2 – won playoff
2. Fløya
3. Lyngen/Karnes
4. Senja
5. Skjervøy
6. Ishavsbyen
7. Bardu
8. Finnsnes
9. Tromsdalen 2
10. Skarp 2
11. Salangen
12. Nordreisa – relegated

Group 24

1. Porsanger – lost playoff
2. Kirkenes
3. Alta 2
4. Norild
5. Bossekop
6. Sørøy/Glimt
7. Kautokeino
8. Båtsfjord
9. Nordlys
10. Tverrelvdalen
11. Tana Varanger Polar – relegated
12. Rafsbotn – relegated
