= 1995 Norwegian Third Division =

Norwegian football league season

The 1995 season of the 3. divisjon was the fourth-highest association football league for men in Norway.

Between 22 and 24 games (depending on the group size) were played in 19 groups, with 3 points awarded for a win and 1 point for a draw. All group winners were promoted to the 2. divisjon, along with some of the best runners-up.

== Tables ==
Group 1

1. Selbak – promoted
2. Østsiden
3. Kvik Halden
4. Lisleby
5. Rygge
6. Tune
7. Askim
8. Trøgstad/Båstad
9. Greåker
10. Torp – relegated
11. Kråkerøy – relegated
12. Tistedalen – relegated

Group 2

1. Grei – promoted
2. Grorud
3. Rælingen
4. Aurskog/Finstadbru
5. Sel
6. Hammerseng
7. Gjelleråsen
8. Lillehammer FK
9. Vinstra
10. Stovnerkameratene – relegated
11. Lom – relegated
12. Fjellhamar – relegated

Group 3

1. Frigg – promoted
2. Grue
3. Årvoll
4. Kongsvinger 2
5. Galterud
6. KFUM
7. Nes
8. Bjerke
9. Fagerborg
10. Kjellmyra – relegated
11. Eidsvold IF – relegated
12. Vålerenga 2 – relegated

Group 4

1. Abildsø – promoted
2. Mercantile
3. Kolbotn
4. Holmen
5. Bækkelaget
6. Fart
7. Stabæk
8. Nordstrand
9. Oppegård
10. Ottestad – relegated
11. Vang – relegated
12. Brumunddal – relegated

Group 5

1. Raufoss – promoted
2. Gjøvik-Lyn
3. Biri
4. Drafn
5. Kolbu/KK
6. Vardal
7. Åmot
8. Skiold
9. Skreia – relegated
10. Strømsgodset 2 – relegated
11. Vikersund – relegated
12. Slemmestad – relegated

Group 6

1. Teie – promoted
2. Larvik Turn
3. Skotfoss
4. Snøgg
5. Stokke
6. Tjølling
7. Flint
8. Storm
9. Holmestrand
10. Nøtterøy – relegated
11. Gulset – relegated
12. Gjekstad & Østerøya – relegated

Group 7

1. Vindbjart – promoted, won all games
2. Jerv
3. Langesund
4. Mandalskameratene
5. Lyngdal
6. Urædd
7. Sørfjell
8. Stathelle
9. Kvinesdal
10. Donn – relegated
11. Drangedal – relegated
12. Tveit – relegated

Group 8

1. Eiger – promoted
2. Varhaug
3. Ulf-Sandnes
4. Stavanger
5. Nærbø
6. Figgjo
7. Ganddal
8. Buøy
9. Riska
10. Staal
11. Sunde – relegated
12. Mosterøy – relegated

Group 9

1. Stord – promoted
2. Sola
3. Vadmyra
4. Åkra
5. Florvåg
6. Odda
7. Trott
8. Skjold
9. Nymark
10. Skjergard – relegated
11. Rosseland – relegated
12. Sandviken – relegated

Group 10

1. Løv-Ham – promoted
2. Ny-Krohnborg
3. Lyngbø
4. Follese
5. Telavåg
6. Brann 2
7. Voss
8. Bjarg
9. Hovding
10. Bergen Sparta – relegated
11. Årstad – relegated
12. Varegg – relegated

Group 11

1. Stryn – promoted
2. Jotun
3. Førde
4. Tornado
5. Sandane
6. Høyang
7. Måløy
8. Jølster
9. Fjøra
10. Eid
11. Kaupanger – relegated
12. Eikefjord – relegated

Group 12

1. Brattvåg – promoted
2. Velledalen og Ringen
3. Hødd 2
4. Hareid
5. Åram
6. Volda
7. Aksla
8. Valder
9. Langevåg
10. Spjelkavik
11. Sykkylven – relegated
12. Stordal – relegated
13. Vigra – relegated

Group 13

1. Molde 2 – promoted
2. Averøykameratene
3. Sunndal
4. Tomrefjord
5. Surnadal
6. Træff
7. Bryn
8. Isfjorden
9. Moldekameratene – relegated
10. Måndalen – relegated
11. Gossen – relegated
12. Eide og Omegn – relegated

Group 14

1. Nationalkameratene – promoted
2. Ranheim
3. Tynset
4. KIL/Hemne
5. Røros
6. Strindheim 2
7. Heimdal
8. Hitra
9. Brekken
10. Gimse – relegated
11. Charlottenlund – relegated
12. Oppdal – relegated

Group 15

1. Namsos – promoted
2. Sverre
3. Kvamskameratene
4. Nidelv
5. Tranabakkan
6. Nessegutten
7. Bangsund
8. Vuku
9. Fosen
10. Rissa
11. Vikingan – relegated
12. Sørlia – relegated

Group 16

1. Sandnesssjøen – promoted
2. Grand Bodø
3. Mosjøen
4. Brønnøysund
5. Åga
6. Bodøkameratene
7. Sørfold
8. Saltdalkameratene
9. Sømna
10. Nesna
11. Tverlandet – relegated
12. Halsakameratene – relegated

Group 17

1. Morild – promoted
2. Narvik/Nor
3. Leknes
4. Medkila
5. Flakstad
6. Vågakameratene
7. Landsås
8. Beisfjord
9. Stokmarknes
10. Skånland
11. Kvæfjord – relegated
12. Ajaks – relegated

Group 18

1. Finnsnes – promoted
2. Ulfstind
3. Nordreisa
4. Salangen
5. Balsfjord
6. Tromsdalen 2
7. Tromsø 2
8. Ramfjord
9. Ringvassøy
10. Mellembygd
11. Fløya – relegated
12. Kåfjord – relegated
13. Vannøy – relegated

Group 19

1. Porsanger – promoted
2. Bjørnevatn
3. Hammerfest
4. Kirkenes
5. Bossekop
6. Polarstjernen
7. Norild
8. Alta 2
9. Nordkinn
10. Nordlys
11. Sørøy Glimt
12. Lakselv – relegated
13. Bølgen – relegated
