= 2001 Norwegian Third Division =

Norwegian football league season

The 2001 season of the 3. divisjon, the fourth highest association football league for men in Norway.

Between 18 and 24 games (depending on group size) were played in 24 groups, with 3 points given for wins and 1 for draws. Twelve teams were promoted to the 2. divisjon through playoff.

== Tables ==
Group 1

1. Lillestrøm 2 – lost playoff
2. Grorud
3. Vålerenga 2
4. Lisleby
5. Råde
6. Rygge
7. Rælingen
8. Rolvsøy
9. Volla (-> FK Focus)
10. Vestli
11. Oppsal – relegated

Group 2

1. Follo – won playoff
2. Østsiden
3. Årvoll
4. KFUM
5. Navestad – relegated
6. Fredrikstad 2
7. Oslo Øst 2
8. Borgen
9. Torp
10. Bjerke
11. Leirsund – relegated
12. Lommedalen – relegated

Group 3

1. Kongsvinger 2
2. Nittedal – lost playoff
3. Brumunddal
4. Skjetten 2
5. Grue
6. Ringsaker
7. Høland
8. Aurskog/Finstadbru
9. Sørumsand
10. Eidskog
11. Kjellmyra – relegated
12. Flisa – relegated

Group 4

1. Moss 2
2. Sparta
3. Strømmen
4. Nordstrand
5. Haugerud
6. Skeid 2
7. Selbak
8. Drøbak/Frogn
9. Fjellhamar
10. Bækkelaget
11. Tistedalen – relegated
12. Korsvoll – relegated

Group 5

1. Frigg – won playoff
2. Trøgstad/Båstad
3. Kjelsås 2
4. Sarpsborg
5. Rakkestad
6. Fagerborg
7. Greåker
8. Spydeberg
9. Sander
10. Galterud
11. Bygdø – relegated
12. Nesodden – relegated

Group 6

1. Elverum – won playoff
2. Raufoss 2
3. Vardal
4. Ringebu/Fåvang
5. Ham-Kam 2
6. Trysil
7. Toten
8. Kolbu/KK
9. FF Lillehammer 2
10. Kvam
11. Lom
12. Sel/Otta – relegated

Group 7

1. Grindvoll – won playoff
2. Mercantile
3. Grei
4. L/F Hønefoss 2
5. Jevnaker
6. Holmen
7. Vang
8. Sør-Aurdal (-> SAFK Fagernes)
9. Lunner
10. Fart
11. Gjøvik-Lyn 2 – relegated
12. Rommen – relegated

Group 8

1. Strømsgodset 2
2. Birkebeineren – lost playoff
3. Fossum
4. Runar
5. Teie
6. Stokke
7. Åssiden
8. Falk
9. Slemmestad
10. Halsen – relegated
11. Drafn – relegated
12. Sandefjord – relegated

Group 9

1. Larvik Fotball – won playoff
2. Flint
3. Larvik Turn
4. Mjøndalen
5. Åmot
6. Vestfossen
7. Eik-Tønsberg 2 (-> Eik-Tønsberg 1)
8. Kongsberg
9. Tønsberg FK
10. Borre
11. Konnerud – relegated
12. Rjukan – relegated

Group 10

1. Jerv – won playoff
2. Langesund/Stathelle
3. Urædd
4. FK Arendal
5. Notodden
6. Skotfoss
7. Skarphedin – relegated
8. Herkules
9. Siljan
10. Brevik
11. Seljord
12. Langangen – relegated

Group 11

1. Vindbjart – lost playoff
2. Lyngdal
3. Start 2
4. Flekkerøy
5. Våg
6. Flekkefjord
7. Vigør
8. Søgne
9. Rygene
10. Kvinesdal
11. Giv Akt – relegated
12. Randesund – relegated

Group 12

1. Klepp – won playoff
2. Bryne 2
3. Eiger
4. Randaberg
5. Vardeneset
6. Vaulen
7. Tasta
8. Ulf-Sandnes
9. Egersund
10. Staal
11. Rosseland – relegated
12. Nærbø – relegated

Group 13

1. Vedavåg Karmøy – lost playoff
2. Ålgård
3. Åkra
4. Hundvåg
5. Hana
6. Torvastad
7. Haugesund 2
8. Figgjo
9. Sola
10. Kopervik
11. Skjold – relegated
12. Ganddal – relegated

Group 14

1. Radøy – lost playoff (-> Radøy/Manger)
2. Hald
3. Ny-Krohnborg
4. Gneist
5. Austevoll
6. Lyngbø
7. Arna-Bjørnar
8. Osterøy
9. Trane
10. Bergen Nord
11. Nordhordland – relegated
12. Frøya – relegated

Group 15

1. Brann 2 – won playoff
2. Askøy
3. Hovding
4. Vadmyra
5. Os
6. Trott
7. Follese
8. Bremnes
9. Varegg
10. Trio
11. Kjøkkelvik – relegated
12. Bjarg – relegated

Group 16

1. Stryn – lost playoff
2. Jotun
3. Fjøra
4. Sogndal 2
5. Sandane
6. Høyang
7. Saga
8. Dale
9. Eid
10. Kaupanger – relegated
11. Askvoll og Holmedal – relegated
12. Eikefjord – relegated

Group 17

1. Langevåg – lost playoff
2. Ørsta
3. Aalesund 2
4. Stranda
5. Velledalen og Ringen
6. Bergsøy
7. Vigra
8. Hareid
9. Volda
10. Brattvåg
11. Ha/No
12. Hovdebygda – relegated
13. Åram/Vankam – relegated

Group 18

1. Dahle – lost playoff
2. Kristiansund
3. Åndalsnes
4. Midsund
5. Sunndal
6. Gossen
7. Surnadal
8. Averøykameratene
9. Ekko/Aureosen
10. Bryn
11. Kvass/Ulvungen – relegated
12. Vestnes Varfjell – relegated

Group 19

1. Nidelv – lost playoff
2. Kolstad
3. Løkken
4. Orkla
5. Tynset
6. Buvik
7. Nardo
8. Malvik
9. Melhus
10. NTNUI
11. KIL/Hemne – relegated
12. Røros – relegated

Group 20

1. Levanger – won playoff
2. Tiller
3. Bangsund
4. Rørvik
5. Rissa
6. Varden – relegated
7. Selbu
8. Vinne
9. Namsos
10. Kvik
11. Bogen – relegated
12. Fosen – relegated

Group 21

1. Innstranden – lost playoff
2. Bodø/Glimt 2
3. Steigen
4. Mosjøen
5. Tverlandet
6. Brønnøysund
7. Sandnessjøen
8. Nesna
9. Leirfjord
10. Mo 2

Group 22

1. Vesterålen – won playoff
2. Skånland
3. Grovfjord
4. Flakstad – relegated
5. Medkila
6. Morild
7. Ballangen
8. Beisfjord
9. Høken
10. Melbo
11. Harstad 2 – relegated

Group 23

1. Salangen – lost playoff
2. Tromsø 2
3. Lyngen/Karnes
4. Senja
5. Fløya
6. Ramfjord
7. Ringvassøy
8. Tromsdalen 2
9. Kvaløysletta
10. Nordreisa
11. Ishavsbyen – relegated
12. Finnsnes 2 – relegated

Group 24

1. Porsanger – lost playoff
2. Kautokeino
3. Bossekop
4. Nordlys
5. Polarstjernen
6. Tverrelvdalen
7. Kirkenes
8. Honningsvåg
9. Nerskogen
10. Nordkinn
11. Sørøy Glimt – relegated
