= 1998 Norwegian Third Division =

Norwegian football league season

The 1998 season of the 3. divisjon, the fourth highest association football league for men in Norway.

Between 20 and 22 games (depending on group size) were played in 19 groups, with 3 points given for wins and 1 for draws. All group winners were promoted to the 2. divisjon, as well as some of the best runners-up.

== Tables ==
Group 1

1. Manglerud Star – promoted
2. Kvik Halden – promoted
3. Sparta
4. Kolbotn
5. Oppegård
6. Borre
7. Mercantile
8. Greåker
9. Lisleby
10. Tune – relegated
11. Bækkelaget – relegated
12. Hafslund – relegated

Group 2

1. Ullensaker/Kisa – promoted
2. Rælingen
3. Raufoss 2
4. Vardal
5. Skeid 2
6. Torp
7. Selbak
8. Toten
9. Røa
10. Kolbu/KK – relegated
11. Gjelleråsen – relegated
12. Lunner – relegated

Group 3

1. Trøgstad/Båstad – promoted
2. Moss 2
3. Grue
4. Rygge
5. Kongsvinger 2
6. Fjellhamar
7. Askim
8. Brandval
9. Holter
10. Sander – relegated
11. Kjellmyra – relegated
12. Nordby – relegated

Group 4

1. Eidsvold Turn – promoted
2. Lom
3. Trysil
4. Vang
5. Skjetten 2
6. Lillehammer FK
7. Vinstra
8. Fart
9. Eidsvold
10. Brumunddal – relegated
11. Follebu – relegated
12. Sel – relegated

Group 5

1. Asker – promoted
2. Rjukan
3. Snøgg
4. Åmot
5. Holmen
6. Strømsgodset 2
7. Birkebeineren
8. Fagerborg
9. Frigg
10. Kongsberg – relegated
11. Bygdø – relegated
12. Slemmestad/Bødalen – relegated

Group 6

1. Skarphedin – promoted
2. Fram
3. Falk
4. Eik-Tønsberg 2
5. Teie
6. Halsen
7. Flint
8. Stathelle
9. Langesund
10. Skotfoss – relegated
11. Storm – relegated
12. Stokke – relegated

Group 7

1. Tollnes – promoted
2. Grim/Start 2 – promoted
3. Kvinesdal
4. Odd/Pors
5. Lyngdal
6. Våg
7. Vindbjart
8. Vigør
9. Sørfjell
10. Randesund – relegated
11. Birkenes – relegated
12. Rygene – relegated

Group 8

1. Viking 2 – promoted
2. Figgjo
3. Skjold
4. Rosseland
5. Ganddal
6. Hundvåg
7. Bryne 2
8. Hana
9. Madla – relegated
10. Egersund – relegated
11. Nærbø – relegated
12. Varhaug – relegated

Group 9

1. Ny-Krohnborg – promoted
2. Kleppestø
3. Åkra
4. Hald
5. Kopervik
6. Odda
7. Nord
8. Trott
9. Bremnes
10. Torvastad – relegated
11. Grannekameratene – relegated
12. Sauda – relegated

Group 10

1. Radøy – promoted
2. Follese
3. Vadmyra
4. Lyngbø
5. Florvåg
6. Løv-Ham
7. Kjøkkelvik
8. Nordhordland
9. Bjørnar
10. Voss – relegated
11. Austevoll – relegated
12. Nymark – relegated

Group 11

1. Florø – promoted
2. Tornado – promoted
3. Eid/Haugen
4. Fjøra
5. Dale
6. Svelgen
7. Sandane
8. Høyang
9. Jølster
10. Stryn 2 – relegated
11. Eikefjord
12. Anga – relegated

Group 12

1. Ørsta – promoted
2. Spjelkavik
3. Brattvåg
4. Hødd 2
5. Bergsøy
6. Stranda
7. Åram/Vankam
8. Velledalen og Ringen
9. Langevåg
10. Skodje
11. Valder – relegated
12. Hareid – relegated

Group 13

1. Sunndal – promoted
2. Vestnes Varfjell
3. Surnadal
4. Søya
5. Bøfjord
6. Ekko/Aureosen
7. Bud
8. Grykameratene
9. Gossen
10. Isfjorden/Langfjorden – relegated
11. Kvass/Ulvungen – relegated
12. Bryn – relegated

Group 14

1. Tynset – promoted
2. Tiller
3. Varden
4. Singsås
5. Løkken
6. Melhus
7. Fram
8. OIL/OIF 2 – relegated
9. Selbu
10. KIL/Hemne
11. Røros – relegated
12. Buvik – relegated

Group 15

1. Namsos – promoted
2. Levanger
3. Nidelv
4. NTHI
5. Malvik
6. Vinne
7. Verdal 2 – relegated
8. Freidig
9. Heimdal
10. Rørvik – relegated
11. Tranabakkan – relegated
12. Kvamskameratene – relegated

Group 16

1. Stålkameratene – promoted
2. Brønnøysund – promoted
3. Saltdalkameratene
4. Fauske/Sprint
5. Sandnessjøen
6. Tverlandet
7. Mo 2
8. Sørfold
9. Nesna
10. Korgen
11. Nordre Meløy
12. Sømna/Tjalg – relegated

Group 17

1. Sortland – promoted
2. Leknes
3. Grovfjord
4. Flakstad
5. Vågakameratene
6. Skånland
7. Medkila
8. Landsås
9. Harstad 2
10. Beisfjord – relegated
11. Lofoten 2/Kabelvåg – relegated

Group 18

1. Skarp – promoted
2. Nordreisa – promoted
3. Tromsø 2
4. Ramfjord
5. Salangen
6. Bardu
7. Tromsdalen 2
8. Mellembygd/Målselvrelegated
9. Fløya
10. Lyngstuva
11. Storsteinnes
12. Nordkjosbotn/Balsfjord – relegated

Group 19

1. Kirkenes – promoted
2. Honningsvåg
3. Porsanger (-> Lakselv/Porsanger)
4. Kautokeino
5. Nordkinn
6. Bossekop
7. Nordlys
8. Tverrelvdalen
9. Bjørnevatn – relegated
10. Sørøy Glimt
11. Lakselv (-> Lakselv/Porsanger)
