= 1992 in Norwegian football =

Football in Norway
- Season: 1992

Men's football
- Tippeligaen: Rosenborg
- 1. divisjon: Bodø/Glimt (Group A); Fyllingen (Group B)
- 2. divisjon: Lillestrøm 2 (Group 1); Skeid (Group 2); Åssiden (Group 3); Åsane (Group 4); Nardo (Group 5); Mjølner (Group 6)
- Cupen: Rosenborg

Women's football
- 1. divisjon: Asker
- Cupen: Setskog/Høland

The 1992 season was the 87th season of competitive football in Norway.

== Men's football ==
=== League season ===
==== Promotion and relegation ====
League	Promoted to league	Relegated from league
Tippeligaen	Mjøndalen; HamKam	Fyllingen; Strømsgodset
1. divisjon	Bodø/Glimt; Bærum; Odd; Os; Vard; Stjørdals-Blink	Kristiansund; Frigg; Surnadal; Mjølner; Råde; Sandefjord BK

==== Tippeligaen ====
Pos	Team	Pld	W	D	L	GF	GA	GD	Pts	Qualification or relegation
1	Rosenborg (C)	22	14	4	4	58	19	+39	46	Qualification for the Champions League preliminary round
2	Kongsvinger	22	12	4	6	43	27	+16	40	Qualification for the UEFA Cup first round
3	Start	22	11	6	5	38	28	+10	39	
4	Lillestrøm	22	11	5	6	48	28	+20	38	Qualification for the Cup Winners' Cup qualifying round
5	Lyn	22	11	4	7	33	29	+4	37	
6	Molde	22	11	3	8	30	30	0	36	
7	Brann	22	4	12	6	26	30	−4	24	
8	Tromsø	22	6	6	10	22	37	−15	24	
9	Viking	22	4	9	9	25	34	−9	21	
10	Ham-Kam (O)	22	5	5	12	30	46	−16	20	Qualification for the relegation play-offs
11	Sogndal (R)	22	5	5	12	30	53	−23	20	Relegation to First Division
12	Mjøndalen (R)	22	5	3	14	20	42	−22	18	Relegation to First Division

Source: fotball.no
Rules for classification: 1) points; 2) goal difference; 3) number of goals scored.
(C) Champions; (O) Play-off winners; (R) Relegated

==== 1. divisjon ====
===== Group A =====
Pos	Team	Pld	W	D	L	GF	GA	GD	Pts	Promotion, qualification or relegation
1	Bodø/Glimt (C, P)	22	16	4	2	69	21	+48	52	Promotion to Tippeligaen
2	Drøbak/Frogn	22	12	2	8	44	36	+8	38	Qualification for the promotion play-offs
3	Strømsgodset	22	11	4	7	48	35	+13	37	
4	Eik-Tønsberg	22	10	4	8	40	38	+2	34	
5	Elverum	22	9	4	9	42	33	+9	31	
6	Tromsdalen	22	9	4	9	30	34	−4	31	
7	Moss	22	9	3	10	35	37	−2	30	
8	Bærum	22	8	5	9	30	34	−4	29	
9	VIF Fotball	22	9	2	11	30	39	−9	29	
10	Odd (R)	22	8	4	10	33	44	−11	28	Relegation to Second Division
11	Pors (R)	22	5	5	12	26	51	−25	20	Relegation to Second Division
12	Fredrikstad (R)	22	3	5	14	18	43	−25	14	Relegation to Second Division

Source: nifs.no
Rules for classification: 1) points; 2) goal difference; 3) number of goals scored.
(C) Champions; (P) Promoted; (R) Relegated

===== Group B =====
Pos	Team	Pld	W	D	L	GF	GA	GD	Pts	Promotion, qualification or relegation
1	Fyllingen (C, P)	22	16	3	3	54	20	+34	51	Promotion to Tippeligaen
2	Strømmen	22	13	4	5	52	20	+32	43	Qualification for the promotion play-offs
3	Fana	22	12	4	6	41	30	+11	40	
4	Bryne	22	12	3	7	47	32	+15	39	
5	Strindheim	22	9	4	9	34	28	+6	31	
6	Djerv 1919	22	8	5	9	47	40	+7	29	
7	Hødd	22	8	4	10	52	46	+6	28	
8	Vard	22	7	6	9	21	32	−11	27	
9	Aalesund	22	6	8	8	31	28	+3	26	
10	Os (R)	22	7	5	10	27	37	−10	26	Relegation to Second Division
11	Stjørdals-Blink (R)	22	5	6	11	34	56	−22	21	Relegation to Second Division
12	Haugar (R)	22	3	0	19	26	97	−71	9	Relegation to Second Division

Source: nifs.no
Rules for classification: 1) points; 2) goal difference; 3) number of goals scored.
(C) Champions; (P) Promoted; (R) Relegated

==== 2. divisjon ====
===== Group 1 =====
Pos	Team	Pld	W	D	L	GF	GA	GD	Pts	Promotion or relegation
1	Lillestrøm 2	22	14	5	3	63	27	+36	47	
2	Ski (P)	22	13	4	5	34	18	+16	43	Promotion to First Division
3	Nybergsund	22	12	6	4	43	18	+25	42	
4	Grue	22	12	5	5	44	24	+20	41	
5	Sørumsand	22	10	3	9	39	30	+9	33	
6	Kolbotn	22	9	2	11	41	48	−7	29	
7	Lørenskog	22	8	4	10	35	39	−4	28	
8	Råde	22	8	3	11	33	43	−10	27	
9	Sprint-Jeløy	22	7	5	10	27	40	−13	26	
10	Sarpsborg (R)	22	7	2	13	33	43	−10	23	Relegation to Third Division
11	Kapp (R)	22	6	2	14	36	76	−40	20	Relegation to Third Division
12	Faaberg (R)	22	2	7	13	17	39	−22	13	Relegation to Third Division

(P) Promoted; (R) Relegated

===== Group 2 =====
Pos	Team	Pld	W	D	L	GF	GA	GD	Pts	Promotion or relegation
1	Skeid (P)	22	15	2	5	74	27	+47	47	Promotion to First Division
2	Kjelsås	22	13	5	4	48	26	+22	44	
3	Stabæk	22	12	7	3	60	23	+37	43	
4	Grei	22	11	4	7	39	26	+13	37	
5	Volda	22	11	4	7	33	27	+6	37	
6	Ullern	22	10	4	8	36	25	+11	34	
7	Frigg	22	7	6	9	33	42	−9	27	
8	Åndalsnes	22	6	4	12	32	46	−14	22	
9	Tornado	22	5	7	10	27	49	−22	22	Relegation to Third Division
10	Skarbøvik (R)	22	5	5	12	24	57	−33	20	Relegation to Third Division
11	Hareid (R)	22	5	4	13	14	37	−23	19	Relegation to Third Division
12	Stranda (R)	22	4	4	14	14	49	−35	16	Relegation to Third Division

(P) Promoted; (R) Relegated

===== Group 3 =====
Pos	Team	Pld	W	D	L	GF	GA	GD	Pts	Promotion or relegation
1	Åssiden (P)	22	12	9	1	42	15	+27	45	Promotion to First Division
2	Ørn-Horten	22	11	6	5	43	23	+20	39	
3	Falk	22	11	4	7	47	29	+18	37	
4	Fram Larvik	22	10	5	7	41	32	+9	35	
5	Jerv	22	9	5	8	37	26	+11	32	
6	Sandefjord	22	9	5	8	39	35	+4	32	
7	Donn	22	7	10	5	41	38	+3	31	
8	Mercantile	22	9	4	9	37	36	+1	31	
9	Start 2	22	6	10	6	32	32	0	28	
10	Øyestad (R)	22	7	6	9	45	46	−1	27	Relegation to Third Division
11	Fossum (R)	22	5	3	14	32	60	−28	18	Relegation to Third Division
12	Asker (R)	22	1	3	18	13	77	−64	6	Relegation to Third Division

(P) Promoted; (R) Relegated

===== Group 4 =====
Pos	Team	Pld	W	D	L	GF	GA	GD	Pts	Promotion or relegation
1	Åsane (P)	22	17	2	3	61	32	+29	53	Promotion to First Division
2	Ålgård	22	14	2	6	52	35	+17	44	
3	Løv-Ham	22	12	2	8	50	35	+15	38	
4	Viking 2	22	11	3	8	38	32	+6	36	
5	Ulf-Sandnes	22	11	2	9	36	31	+5	35	
6	Brann 2	22	11	1	10	50	41	+9	34	
7	Vidar	22	10	4	8	42	40	+2	34	
8	Stord	22	9	5	8	49	41	+8	32	
9	Klepp	22	7	4	11	36	44	−8	25	
10	Vadmyra (R)	22	6	4	12	35	54	−19	22	Relegation to Third Division
11	Fyllingen 2 (R)	22	4	2	16	28	53	−25	14	Relegation to Third Division
12	Lyngbø (R)	22	3	3	16	19	58	−39	12	Relegation to Third Division

(P) Promoted; (R) Relegated

===== Group 5 =====
Pos	Team	Pld	W	D	L	GF	GA	GD	Pts	Promotion or relegation
1	Nardo (P)	22	13	6	3	68	30	+38	45	Promotion to First Division
2	Melhus	22	14	3	5	54	26	+28	45	
3	Rosenborg 2	22	12	5	5	56	29	+27	41	
4	Orkdal	22	11	3	8	47	38	+9	36	
5	Averøykameratene	22	10	5	7	44	38	+6	35	
6	Steinkjer	22	9	5	8	34	45	−11	32	
7	Byåsen	22	9	4	9	38	33	+5	31	
8	Surnadal	22	9	2	11	37	46	−9	29	
9	Namsos	22	8	3	11	41	50	−9	27	
10	Alvdal (R)	22	5	7	10	29	47	−18	22	Relegation to Third Division
11	Kristiansund (R)	22	5	5	12	30	51	−21	20	Relegation to Third Division
12	KIL/Hemne (R)	22	1	4	17	22	67	−45	7	Relegation to Third Division

(P) Promoted; (R) Relegated

===== Group 6 =====
Pos	Team	Pld	W	D	L	GF	GA	GD	Pts	Promotion or relegation
1	Mjølner (P)	22	20	0	2	76	14	+62	60	Promotion to First Division
2	Grovfjord	22	13	3	6	56	25	+31	42	
3	Lyngen/Karnes	22	12	3	7	48	31	+17	39	
4	Skarp	22	11	3	8	42	34	+8	36	
5	Honningsvåg	22	9	3	10	39	40	−1	30	
6	Alta	22	9	2	11	46	39	+7	29	
7	Gevir/Vinkelen	22	8	4	10	47	54	−7	28	
8	Sortland	22	8	3	11	27	41	−14	27	
9	Stålkameratene	22	7	6	9	32	51	−19	27	
10	Narvik/Nor (R)	22	7	5	10	32	41	−9	26	Relegation to Third Division
11	Sandnessjøen (R)	22	6	7	9	37	51	−14	25	Relegation to Third Division
12	Indrefjord (R)	22	1	3	18	18	79	−61	6	Relegation to Third Division

(P) Promoted; (R) Relegated

=== Norwegian Cup ===
==== Final ====
25 October 1992
13:15 CET (UTC+1)

Rosenborg	3–2	Lillestrøm
Dahlum 29'; Sørloth 50'; Bjørnebye 90'	Report	Mjelde 31', 60'

Ullevaal Stadion, Oslo
Attendance: 28,217
Referee: Rune Pedersen (Sprint/Jeløy)

== Women's football ==
=== League season ===
==== 1. divisjon ====
Pos	Team	Pld	W	D	L	GF	GA	GD	Pts	Relegation
1	Asker (C)	18	14	3	1	73	17	+56	45	
2	Setskog/Høland	18	12	3	3	51	34	+17	39	
3	Sprint/Jeløy	18	11	3	4	47	27	+20	36	
4	Sandviken	18	10	4	4	56	27	+29	34	
5	Trondheims-Ørn	18	9	4	5	49	31	+18	31	
6	Klepp	18	6	4	8	38	52	−14	22	
7	Grand Bodø	18	5	4	9	28	40	−12	19	
8	Jardar	18	2	5	11	32	55	−23	11	
9	Bøler (R)	18	2	4	12	23	72	−49	10	Relegation to Second Division
10	Spjelkavik (R)	18	1	2	15	23	65	−42	5	Relegation to Second Division

(C) Champions; (R) Relegated

=== Norwegian Women's Cup ===
==== Final ====
- Setskog/Høland 3–0 Asker

== UEFA competitions ==
=== UEFA Champions League ===
==== First round ====
Team 1	Agg.	Team 2	1st leg	2nd leg
Barcelona (Spain)	1–0	(Norway) Viking	1–0	0–0

=== European Cup Winners' Cup ===
==== Qualifying round ====
Team 1	Agg.	Team 2	1st leg	2nd leg
Strømsgodset (Norway)	0–4	(Israel) Hapoel Petah Tikva	0–2	0–2

=== UEFA Cup ===
==== First round ====
Team 1	Agg.	Team 2	1st leg	2nd leg
Dynamo Moscow (Commonwealth of Independent States)	5–3	(Norway) Rosenborg BK	5–1	0–2

== National teams ==
=== Norway men's national football team ===
==== Results ====
7 January 1992 Friendly	Egypt	0–0 (a.e.t.) (5–4 p)	Norway	Cairo, Egypt
CET (UTC+1)		Report		Stadium: Cairo International Stadium; Attendance: 11,872; Referee: Jamal Al Sharif (Syria)
