= 1992 Norwegian Second Division =

Norwegian football league season

The 1992 2. divisjon, the third highest association football league for men in Norway.

22 games were played in 6 groups, with 3 points given for wins and 1 for draws. Ski, Skeid, Åssiden, Åsane, Nardo and Mjølner were promoted to the First Division. Number ten, eleven and twelve were relegated to the 3. divisjon. The winning teams from each of the 19 groups in the 3. divisjon were promoted to the 2. divisjon.

== League tables ==
=== Group 1 ===
Pos	Team	Pld	W	D	L	GF	GA	GD	Pts	Promotion or relegation
1	Lillestrøm 2	22	14	5	3	63	27	+36	47	
2	Ski (P)	22	13	4	5	34	18	+16	43	Promotion to First Division
3	Nybergsund	22	12	6	4	43	18	+25	42	
4	Grue	22	12	5	5	44	24	+20	41	
5	Sørumsand	22	10	3	9	39	30	+9	33	
6	Kolbotn	22	9	2	11	41	48	−7	29	
7	Lørenskog	22	8	4	10	35	39	−4	28	
8	Råde	22	8	3	11	33	43	−10	27	
9	Sprint-Jeløy	22	7	5	10	27	40	−13	26	
10	Sarpsborg (R)	22	7	2	13	33	43	−10	23	Relegation to Third Division
11	Kapp (R)	22	6	2	14	36	76	−40	20	Relegation to Third Division
12	Faaberg (R)	22	2	7	13	17	39	−22	13	Relegation to Third Division

(P) Promoted; (R) Relegated

=== Group 2 ===
Pos	Team	Pld	W	D	L	GF	GA	GD	Pts	Promotion or relegation
1	Skeid (P)	22	15	2	5	74	27	+47	47	Promotion to First Division
2	Kjelsås	22	13	5	4	48	26	+22	44	
3	Stabæk	22	12	7	3	60	23	+37	43	
4	Grei	22	11	4	7	39	26	+13	37	
5	Volda	22	11	4	7	33	27	+6	37	
6	Ullern	22	10	4	8	36	25	+11	34	
7	Frigg	22	7	6	9	33	42	−9	27	
8	Åndalsnes	22	6	4	12	32	46	−14	22	
9	Tornado	22	5	7	10	27	49	−22	22	Relegation to Third Division
10	Skarbøvik (R)	22	5	5	12	24	57	−33	20	Relegation to Third Division
11	Hareid (R)	22	5	4	13	14	37	−23	19	Relegation to Third Division
12	Stranda (R)	22	4	4	14	14	49	−35	16	Relegation to Third Division

(P) Promoted; (R) Relegated

=== Group 3 ===
Pos	Team	Pld	W	D	L	GF	GA	GD	Pts	Promotion or relegation
1	Åssiden (P)	22	12	9	1	42	15	+27	45	Promotion to First Division
2	Ørn-Horten	22	11	6	5	43	23	+20	39	
3	Falk	22	11	4	7	47	29	+18	37	
4	Fram Larvik	22	10	5	7	41	32	+9	35	
5	Jerv	22	9	5	8	37	26	+11	32	
6	Sandefjord	22	9	5	8	39	35	+4	32	
7	Donn	22	7	10	5	41	38	+3	31	
8	Mercantile	22	9	4	9	37	36	+1	31	
9	Start 2	22	6	10	6	32	32	0	28	
10	Øyestad (R)	22	7	6	9	45	46	−1	27	Relegation to Third Division
11	Fossum (R)	22	5	3	14	32	60	−28	18	Relegation to Third Division
12	Asker (R)	22	1	3	18	13	77	−64	6	Relegation to Third Division

(P) Promoted; (R) Relegated

=== Group 4 ===
Pos	Team	Pld	W	D	L	GF	GA	GD	Pts	Promotion or relegation
1	Åsane (P)	22	17	2	3	61	32	+29	53	Promotion to First Division
2	Ålgård	22	14	2	6	52	35	+17	44	
3	Løv-Ham	22	12	2	8	50	35	+15	38	
4	Viking 2	22	11	3	8	38	32	+6	36	
5	Ulf-Sandnes	22	11	2	9	36	31	+5	35	
6	Brann 2	22	11	1	10	50	41	+9	34	
7	Vidar	22	10	4	8	42	40	+2	34	
8	Stord	22	9	5	8	49	41	+8	32	
9	Klepp	22	7	4	11	36	44	−8	25	
10	Vadmyra (R)	22	6	4	12	35	54	−19	22	Relegation to Third Division
11	Fyllingen 2 (R)	22	4	2	16	28	53	−25	14	Relegation to Third Division
12	Lyngbø (R)	22	3	3	16	19	58	−39	12	Relegation to Third Division

(P) Promoted; (R) Relegated

=== Group 5 ===
Pos	Team	Pld	W	D	L	GF	GA	GD	Pts	Promotion or relegation
1	Nardo (P)	22	13	6	3	68	30	+38	45	Promotion to First Division
2	Melhus	22	14	3	5	54	26	+28	45	
3	Rosenborg 2	22	12	5	5	56	29	+27	41	
4	Orkdal	22	11	3	8	47	38	+9	36	
5	Averøykameratene	22	10	5	7	44	38	+6	35	
6	Steinkjer	22	9	5	8	34	45	−11	32	
7	Byåsen	22	9	4	9	38	33	+5	31	
8	Surnadal	22	9	2	11	37	46	−9	29	
9	Namsos	22	8	3	11	41	50	−9	27	
10	Alvdal (R)	22	5	7	10	29	47	−18	22	Relegation to Third Division
11	Kristiansund (R)	22	5	5	12	30	51	−21	20	Relegation to Third Division
12	KIL/Hemne (R)	22	1	4	17	22	67	−45	7	Relegation to Third Division

(P) Promoted; (R) Relegated

=== Group 6 ===
Pos	Team	Pld	W	D	L	GF	GA	GD	Pts	Promotion or relegation
1	Mjølner (P)	22	20	0	2	76	14	+62	60	Promotion to First Division
2	Grovfjord	22	13	3	6	56	25	+31	42	
3	Lyngen/Karnes	22	12	3	7	48	31	+17	39	
4	Skarp	22	11	3	8	42	34	+8	36	
5	Honningsvåg	22	9	3	10	39	40	−1	30	
6	Alta	22	9	2	11	46	39	+7	29	
7	Gevir/Vinkelen	22	8	4	10	47	54	−7	28	
8	Sortland	22	8	3	11	27	41	−14	27	
9	Stålkameratene	22	7	6	9	32	51	−19	27	
10	Narvik/Nor (R)	22	7	5	10	32	41	−9	26	Relegation to Third Division
11	Sandnessjøen (R)	22	6	7	9	37	51	−14	25	Relegation to Third Division
12	Indrefjord (R)	22	1	3	18	18	79	−61	6	Relegation to Third Division

(P) Promoted; (R) Relegated
