= Osterøy =

Osterøy may refer to:

== Places ==
- Osterøy Municipality, a municipality in Vestland county, Norway
- Osterøy (island), an island in Vestland county, Norway

== Other ==
- Osterøy prosti, a former deanery in the Church of Norway
- Osterøy Bridge, a road bridge in Osterøy Municipality in Vestland county, Norway
- Osterøy IL, a sports club based in Osterøy Municipality in Vestland county, Norway

== See also ==
- Østerøya
