= Tverrelvdalen =

Village in Alta Municipality, Norway

Tverrelvdalen (Norwegian); Fállejohka (Northern Sami); Fallijoki (Kven)
- Village
- Interactive map of: Tverrelvdalen (Norwegian); Fállejohka (Northern Sami); Fallijoki (Kven)
- Location within Finnmark Location within Norway
- Coordinates: 69°56′41″N 23°23′30″E
- Country: Norway
- Region: Northern Norway
- County: Finnmark
- District: Vest-Finnmark
- Municipality: Alta Municipality

Area
  - Total: 0.37 km^{2} (0.14 sq mi)
- Elevation: 103 m (338 ft)

Population (2023)
  - Total: 457
  - Density: 1,235/km^{2} (3,200/sq mi)
- Time zone: UTC+01:00 (CET)
  - Summer (DST): UTC+02:00 (CEST)
- Post Code: 9517 Alta

Tverrelvdalen (Norwegian), Fállejohka (Northern Sami), or Fallijoki (Kven) is a village area in the Tverrelvdalen valley in Alta Municipality in Finnmark county, Norway. It is a suburb to the southeast of the town of Alta. The river Tverrelva runs through the valley and village area.

The 0.37-square-kilometre (91-acre) village has a population (2023) of 457 and a population density of 1,235 inhabitants per square kilometre (3,200/sq mi).

The Tverrelvdalen IL sports club is based here.
