= Odd-Karl Stangnes =

Norwegian footballer and coach (born 1968)

Odd-Karl Stangnes (born 28 October 1968) is a Norwegian football coach and former player, who was most recently the manager for Stjørdals-Blink. He has previously managed Swedish sides IFK Luleå and Kiruna FF. A defender during his active career, Stangnes played for two clubs in the Norwegian Premier League.

== Playing career ==
Hailing from Skjervøy Municipality, his career began in Skjervøy IK, where he played from 1985 to 1996 except for the season 1991 when he played in Strømmen IF and the seasons 1994–95 in Nordreisa. He then played in the Norwegian Premier League with Bodø/Glimt and Lyn, and in the First Division (second tier) with Lyn, FK Lofoten (on loan) and Skeid. His last club was Ull/Kisa, which he left midway through the 2007 season.
