= Hauger FK =

Norwegian football club

- Full name: Hauger Fotballklubb
- Founded: 14 October 1969
- Ground: Rudbanen
- League: Norwegian Fourth Division
- 2008: 4th
Home colours

Hauger Fotballklubb was an association football club from Bærum, Norway.

It was founded on 14 October 1969, and plays at Rudbanen, which got astroturf in 2004. Hauger played in the Third Division in the seasons 2005, 2006, 2007 and 2010.

In 2014 Hauger FK joined Bærums Verk Idrettsforening and established a new sports club, Bærums Verk og Hauger Idrettsforening.
