= Stoppen SK =

Norwegian football club

- Full name: Stoppen Sportsklubb
- Founded: 12 April 2012
- Ground: Stoppen kunstgress, Nøste, Lier
- League: Fourth Division
- 2024: 8th

Stoppen Sportsklubb is a Norwegian association football club from Lier, Buskerud.

Stoppen SK was founded on 12 April 2012 as a merger of Sparta/Bragerøen and Liungen IF. As Sparta/Bragerøen played in the Third Division, Stoppen directly succeeded that team.

The club debuted in the 2013 Norwegian Third Division, but was relegated. Said head coach Thomas Røed; "We understood quite early that this could well end relegation". Following another relegation to the Fifth Division, the men's team won promotion to the 2019 Fourth Division. Another relegation in 2021 was followed by instant re-promotion.

The women's team plays in the Fourth Division as of 2025.
