= Birkenes IL =

Norwegian sports club

- Full name: Birkenes Idrettslag
- Founded: 18 November 1924; 100 years ago
- Ground: Birkenesparken, Birkeland
- League: Fifth Division
- 2015: Fifth Division / Agder, 3rd
Home colours

Birkenes Idrettslag is a Norwegian sports club from Birkeland, Agder. It has sections for association football, team handball, volleyball, cycling, track and field, orienteering, biathlon, and Nordic skiing.

It is known for its biathletes. Gunn Margit Andreassen represented the club, so does Lars Helge Birkeland. Cyclist Dag Erik Pedersen also represented the club.

The men's football team played in the Third Division, the fourth tier of Norwegian football, in 1998. It currently resides in the Fifith Division.
