= Ridabu IL =

Norwegian football club

- Full name: Ridabu Idrettslag
- Founded: 1965
- Ground: Black River Park, Ridabu
- League: 4. divisjon
- 2024: 4. divisjon group IØ, 7th of 14
- Website: https://ridabu-il.spoortz.no

Ridabu Idrettslag is a Norwegian association football from Ridabu, Hamar, Innlandet.

The men's football team plays in the 4. divisjon, the fifth tier of Norwegian football.

In 2023, the team won promotion to the 2024 Norwegian Fourth Division. They subsequently signed Aleksander Melgalvis, then-captain of the largest team in the city, Hamarkameratene. Ridabu then started 2024 by progressing to the first round of the Norwegian Football Cup for the first time in its history. In the first round, Ridabu was drawn against Hamarkameratene.
