= Tangmoen IL =

Norwegian football club

- Full name: Tangmoen Idrettslag
- Founded: 1978
- Ground: Tangmoen kunstgress, Stjørdalshalsen
- League: 3. divisjon
Home colours

Tangmoen Idrettslag is a Norwegian association football club from Stjørdal Municipality in Trøndelag county.

The club was founded in 1978. The men's football team currently plays in the 3. divisjon, the third tier of Norwegian football, since 2012. It also had a previous stint from 2009 to 2010.
