= Vinne IL =

Norwegian football club

- Full name: Vinne Idrettslag
- Founded: 15 October 1937
- Ground: Vinne stadion, Vinne
- League: Fifth Division
- 2025: 7th

Vinne Idrettslag is a Norwegian association football club from Vinne, Verdal.

The club was founded in 1937 as Vinne og Ness Turn. Originally a gymnastics club, football was added in 1967 and volleyball in 1976.

The men's football team currently plays in the Fifth Division, the sixth tier of Norwegian football. The team played in the Third Division from 1992 to 1994, 1996 to 1999, and 2001 to 2003.

The team appeared in the 1999 Norwegian Football Cup, losing 0–4 to Bodø/Glimt in the first round.

The women's team currently plays in the Fourth Division.
