= Austrått IL =

Norwegian sports club

Austrått
- Full name: Austrått Idrettslag
- Founded: 1977
- Ground: Iglemyr gras Sandnes
- League: Fourth Division
Home colours

Austrått Idrettslag is a Norwegian sports club from Sandnes. It has sections for association football, team handball, volleyball and inline skating.

It was founded in 1977 as a borough club for Austrått in Sandnes.

The men's football team currently plays in the Fourth Division, the fifth tier of Norwegian football. The team played in the Third Division as late as in 2014, and also during a short stint from 2008 to 2009. Their team colors are dark blue and white.

The club has also contested the higher leagues in volleyball.
