= Furnes Fotball =

Norwegian football club

Furnes
- Full name: Furnes Fotball
- Founded: 4 August 1932
- Ground: Gaalaasbana, Ringsaker Municipality
- League: 4. divisjon
- 2019: 6th

Furnes Fotball is a Norwegian association football club from Ringsaker Municipality Innlandet county.

The Nordic skiing club Furnes SF was founded on 24 January 1892. A football section was added to that club on 4 August 1932. In 1945 Furnes SF merged with the AIF club Furnes AIL to form Furnes IL. Handball was added as a sport in 1946, and at that time the club also had sections for athletics and orienteering. Later, the different sport codes were demerged, forming Furnes Fotball, Furnes Håndball and reinvigorating Furnes SF. Furnes Fotball counts 1932 as its foundation year. The three clubs' logos are variations of the old Furnes SF logo.

The men's football team plays in the 4. divisjon, the fifth tier of Norwegian football. It had stints in the 3. divisjon from 2003, 2004 and 2006.
