= Rygene IL =

Norwegian sports club

- Full name: Rygene Idrettslag
- Founded: 23 November 1933
- Ground: Rygene stadion, Rykene
- League: Fifth Division
Home colours

Rygene Idrettslag is a Norwegian sports club from Rykene, Aust-Agder. It has sections for association football, team handball and Nordic skiing.

It was founded on 23 November 1933 as Rygene AIL, and was a member of the Workers' Confederation of Sports. In 1953 it had no handball section, but since then it has lost its section for track and field.

The men's football team last played in the Third Division, the fourth tier of Norwegian football from 2001 to 2002. The team now plays in the Fifth Division.
