= Stranda IL =

Norwegian football club

- Full name: Stranda Idrottslag
- Founded: 15 August 1914
- Ground: Stranda stadion, Stranda
- League: Fifth Division
- 2024 4. div.: 12th

Stranda Idrottslag is a Norwegian multi-sports club based in the village of Stranda which is located in Stranda Municipality in Møre og Romsdal county. It has sections for association football, team handball, basketball, alpine skiing, Nordic skiing, table tennis and climbing.

The club was founded on 15 August 1914.

The men's football team plays in the Fifth Division, the sixth tier of Norwegian football. After playing on the third tier, Stranda was relegated from the Second Division in 1992 and had stints in the Third Division from 1993 to 1994 and 1996 to 1999. Winning promotion to the 2000 Norwegian Second Division, they faced relegation after the season. Several stints in the Third Division followed, with the longest—and final—taking place from 2010 to 2013

The women's football team plays in the Fifth Division.

Its most accomplished sportspeople are alpine skier Bjarne Solbakken and handballer Ragnhild Fausa.
