= Riska FK =

Norwegian football club

- Full name: Riska Fotballklubb
- Founded: 10 June 1945
- Ground: Riska stadion Riska
- League: Third Division
Home colours

Riska Fotballklubb is a Norwegian association football club from the borough of Riska in the city of Sandnes.

The men's football team currently plays in the Third Division, the fourth tier of Norwegian football. The team was newly promoted for 2015, and in recent times they had sporadic Third Division seasons in 1995, 1996, 2004 and 2010. The team colours are yellow and black.
