= Sandved IL =

Norwegian sports club

- Full name: Sandved Idrettslag
- Founded: 27 May 1980
- Ground: Sandved kunstgress Sandved
- League: Fourth Division
Home colours

Sandved Idrettslag is a Norwegian sports club located in Sandnes, in Rogaland county, Norway. It has sections for association football and volleyball.

The men's football team currently plays in the Fourth Division, the fifth tier of Norwegian football. The team last contested the Third Division from 2006 to 2010. The team colours are white and green.

The club formerly (from 1980) had a section for speed skating, but it broke away in 1990 to form Sandnes SK.
