= IL Jutul =

Norwegian sports club

- Full name: Idrettslaget Jutul
- Founded: 1930
- Ground: Football: Skuisletta, Skui, Bærum; Ice hockey: Bærum Ishall, Rud, Bærum

IL Jutul Fotball
Home colours

Idrettslaget Jutul is a Norwegian sports club from Bærum, Akershus. It covers the areas Skui and Vøyenenga.

== History ==
It was founded in 1930 as AIL Viking, a Workers' Sport Confederation club. It has sections for association football, ice hockey, volleyball and Nordic skiing/athletics. It is named after a Norwegian word for the Jötunn in Norse mythology.

== Sports divisions ==
=== Ice hockey ===
The men's ice hockey team currently plays in the First Division, the second tier of Norwegian ice hockey. It won promotion after the 2008–09 Second Division season. Well-known players include Michael Smithurst, Tom Erik Olsen and Halvor Hårstad-Evjen. Eirik Hansen is an ice hockey referee of merit. The team's home arena is Bærum Ishall.

=== Football ===
The men's football team currently plays in the Fourth Division, the fifth tier of Norwegian football, after being relegated from the Third Division in the 2011 Norwegian Third Division. Jotul had been playing in the Third Division since it won promotion after the 2007 Fourth Division season. Jotul was Thomas Finstad's youth club. The women's team plays in the Fourth Division, the fifth tier, but as a cooperation team between northern neighbor Bærums Verk IF. Its home field is Skuisletta.

=== Volleyball ===
The volleyball section had a heyday in the post-war period. The women's team won eight national titles in the first ten years that a Norwegian championship was arranged (the first, which Jutul did not win, was in 1946). The club sent three players to the first Norwegian national team in 1953; three women were chosen to fill the spots by an internal sortition.

=== Athletics ===
Its athletics section is largely defunct now, but has been more active before. The club has five medals in Norwegian championships, all won by Kristian Johansen in the discus throw. He won bronze medals in 1949, 1951 and 1956, a silver medal in 1953 and a gold medal in 1955 with 47.36 metres. His rivals were Stein Johnson, Per Stavem, Ivar Ramstad, Stein Haugen and Reidar Hagen. The athletics section does arrange a fell running competition named "Opp Kantebakk".
