= IL ROS =

Norwegian sports club

- Full name: Idrettslaget Røyken og Spikkestad
- Founded: 6 November 1919; 20 March 1963 (merger)
- Ground: Spikkestad stadion Spikkestad
Home colours

Idrettslaget Røyken og Spikkestad is a Norwegian sports club from Røyken municipality. It has sections for athletics, football, handball, cycling, tennis, gymnastics, volleyball, and skiing.

Its history goes back to Spikkestad IF, which was founded in 1919. On 20 March 1963 it merged with neighboring club Røyken IF, founded on 16 March 1932. Originally called Røyken og Spikkestad IF, the name was soon decided to be IL ROS.

Its men's football team currently resides in the Norwegian Fourth Division, the fifth tier. It played in the Third Division as late as in the 2007 season. Christer Basma started his career in the club.

In the fall of 2008 its women's football team started a collaboration with a neighbouring team, "Nærsnes og Åros IF", in order to maintain the opportunity for female players in both clubs to play football. Both teams were struggling with having enough players to form a full team. (Players from other clubs were also invited to join as many clubs in the area were struggling with the same problem). This collaboration has, so far, resulted in gathering enough young women to form a third division women's team and a U19 team.
