= IL Hei =

Norwegian football club

- Full name: Idrettslaget Hei
- Founded: 13 May 1931
- Ground: Mortens plass, Porsgrunn
- League: Fourth Division
- 2025: 1st

Idrettslaget Hei is a Norwegian multi-sports club from Heistad, Porsgrunn. It has sections for association football, team handball, Nordic skiing and E-sports.

The club was founded on 13 May 1931. Their first sports facility was a ski jumping hill, which had to be rebuilt elsewhere after Norsk Hydro demanded the area for industrial purposes. The club also built sports fields at Heisletta. During their first decades, the club also had sections for athletics and gymnastics. The club colours are green and black.

The men's football team currently plays in the Fourth Division, the fifth tier of football in Norway. The women's team currently plays in the Third Division.

The men's football team had short spells in the Third Division in 1993 and 2015. The latter season ended badly, conceding 103 goals in 26 games. The team also reached the first round of the cup in 2017 and 2022-23. Losing both matches to Odd, the deficit in 2017 was 0–10. In 2024 Hei reached the first round again, only losing 0–1 to Pors. The men's team also dominated the Fourth Division group in Telemark in much of the 2020s, winning the group in 2022, 2023 and 2025. However, on every occasion the team lost the playoff to the Third Division, to a string of different opponents.
