= Tverlandet IL =

Norwegian sports club

- Full name: Tverlandet Idrettslag
- Founded: 1928
- Ground: Tverlandet kunstgress, Løding
- League: 3. divisjon
Home colours

Tverlandet Idrettslag is a Norwegian multi-sports club from Løding, Nordland. It has sections for association football, team handball, human swimming, Nordic skiing and orienteering. The club was founded in 1928.

The men's football team currently plays in the 3. divisjon, the fourth tier of Norwegian football, since 2012. It also had stints in the 3. Divisjon from 1998 to 2002 and 2007 to 2010
