= Osterøy IL =

Norwegian sports club

- Full name: Osterøy Idrettslag
- Founded: 15 February 1918
- Ground: Osterøy stadion, Lonevåg
- League: Fifth Division
Home colours

Osterøy Idrettslag is a Norwegian sports club from Osterøy Municipality in Vestland county. It has sections for football, handball, track and field, gymnastics and Nordic skiing.

The club was founded on 15 February 1918 as TIL Skarphedin. On 12 April 1946 it merged with Mjeldalen SL and Skarpodder and took the name Osterøy IL.

The men's football team currently resides in the Fifth Division (sixth tier). It last played in the Third Division from 2001 to 2002.

The track and field section is vigorous.
