= Ottestad IL =

Norwegian sports club

- Full name: Ottestad Idrettslag
- Founded: 28 May 1918
- Ground: Ottestad Idrettspark; Ottestad
- League: Fourth Division
- 2024: Fourth Division group IØ, 10th of 14
Home colours	Away colours

Ottestad Idrettslag is a Norwegian sports club from Ottestad in Stange Municipality, founded on 28 May 1918. It has sections for association football, team handball, cross-country skiing and cycling.

The men's football team played in the Third Division in the years 1993–1995, 2004–2006, 2009–2016 as well as 2018, and plays its home matches at Ottestad Idrettspark.

The team reached the Second Round of the Norwegian Football Cup for the first time in 2012 Norwegian Football Cup, after beating Brumunddal 4–3 in the First Round. In the Second Round, Ottestad was beaten 2–0 by the Tippeligaen club Lillestrøm, the same result as in 1993, the last time Ottestad met Lillestrøm.
