= Kvaløya SK =

Norwegian sports club

- Full name: Kvaløya Sportsklubb
- Founded: 29 April 2010
- Ground: Storelva kunstgress, Tromsø
- League: 4. divisjon
- 2021: 8th

Kvaløya Sportsklubb is a Norwegian sports club from Kvaløya, Tromsø. It has sections for association football and team handball.

It was established on 29 April 2010 as a merger of Kvaløysletta IL (founded 1970) and the smaller Slettaelva SK (founded 1992).

The men's football team currently plays in the Fourth Division, the fifth tier of Norwegian football. Kvaløysletta played in the Third Division in 1992–1994, 2000–2002, 2005 and 2007–2008.
