= Gran IL =

Norwegian sports club

- Full name: Gran Idrettslag
- Founded: 10 June 1945
- Ground: Sparebank1-banen, Gran
- League: 4. divisjon
- 2024: 4. divisjon group IØ, 9th of 14

Gran Idrettslag is a Norwegian multi-sports club from Gran Municipality in Innlandet county. It has sections for association football, volleyball, basketball, badminton, tennis, gymnastics, swimming, climbing, and Nordic skiing.

The club was founded on 10 June 1945. There had been two previous clubs, Gran UIL from 1933 and the AIF club Gran AIL, but Gran IL regards both of these as having gone defunct before the foundation of Gran IL.

The men's football team plays in the 4. divisjon, the fifth tier of Norwegian football. It had stints in the 3. divisjon as late as 2010, 2014 and 2016, but were relegated on every occasion.
