= Nordkinn FK =

Norwegian football club

- Full name: Nordkinn Fotballklubb
- Founded: 22 November 1992
- Ground: Mehamn gress, Mehamn
- Owner: Lars Erik Aassved
- Chairman: Benedikte Krogh
- League: Norwegian Fourth Division (2012)
- Website: https://nordkinnfk.no/
Home colours

Nordkinn Fotballklubb is a Norwegian association football club from Mehamn, Finnmark.

It was founded on 22 November 1992 as a merger of the football sections of the clubs IL Nordkyn from Kjøllefjord and Mehamn IL. The club colors are red.

The men's football team currently plays in the Fourth Division, the fifth tier of Norwegian football. Their current run on the Third Division stretches from 2009; they previously had a run from 2001 to 2003.
