= IL Norborg =

Norwegian sports club

Home colours

Idrettslaget Norborg is a Norwegian sports club based in the villages of Grytastranda, Søvik and Gamlem in Haram Municipality in Sunnmøre. It was founded on Sunday 21 January 1962, and takes its name from the old Borgund; Norborg after "Nordre Borgund" (lit. 'northern Borgund').

Their activities include football, badminton and gymnastics. They also previously had sections for volleyball and handball (merged with Brattvåg IL – handball to form Haram Handballklubb on 16 March 1989).

Football is by far the main activity with around 200 active members. The A Team joined the league system in 1968 and played the 2016 season in the 4. divisjon.

The team has orange shirts and socks, and black shorts. They play their home games at the Uggedal stadion on grass (opened 5 June 2005). In winter 2008, they decided to open an artificial turf pitch on the gravel track at Uggedalen. This work started on 12 June 2009 and was finished in October 2009, with the pitch officially opened on 31 October with a match between the villages of Grytastranda and Søvik.

In the 2014 season, Norborg achieved their best ever finish of 13th in the 3rd division. They also achieved 9th and 10th-place finishes in the 3rd division in 2009 and 2010, but at that time, the 3rd division had twice as many teams. In 2014, they were also ranked as the tenth best team in Sunnmøre.

On 27 November 2014, the club announced Stig Jacob Johansen as the new head coach.

== Football ==
Through the majority of its existence, the sports club's football team has played in the amateur regional divisions (4. divisjon and lower) of the Norwegian football league system, with the occasional brief promotions to 3. divisjon.

Year	Division	Placing	Points
1968	5th Division	7th	3
1969	6th Division	5th	11
1970	6th Division	3rd	18
1971	6th Division	3rd	17
1972	5th Division	4th	15
1973	5th Division	4th	15
1974	5th Division	5th	13
1975	5th Division	5th	19
1976	5th Division	4th	20
1977	5th Division	5th	19
1978	5th Division	9th	11
1979	5th Division	3rd	22
1980	5th Division	1st	26
1981	4th Division	8th	18
1982	4th Division	8th	20
1983	4th Division	12th	10
1984	5th Division	3rd	21
1985	5th Division	8th	13
1986	5th Division	10th	6
1987	6th Division	3rd	38
1988	6th Division	4th	29
1989	6th Division	8th	21
1990	6th Division	9th	11
1991	6th Division	7th	18
1992	6th Division	3rd	40
1993	6th Division	6th	24
1994	6th Division	8th	23
1995	6th Division	7th	24
1996	6th Division	1st	41
1997	5th Division	8th	3
1998	6th Division	7th	11
1999	6th Division	7th	8
2000	6th Division	2nd	34
2001	5th Division	3rd	40
2002	5th Division	1st	43
2003	4th Division	5th	36
2004	4th Division	5th	33
2005	4th Division	7th	25
2006	4th Division	5th	38
2007	4th Division	7th	27
2008	4th Division	1st	44
2009	3rd Division	9th	26
2010	3rd Division	10th	22
2011	4th Division	10th	24
2012	4th Division	5th	30
2013	4th Division	1st	46
2014	3rd Division	13th	21
2015	4th Division	2nd	42

Coaches: Robert V. Iversen and Sigmund Gjerset 1968, Sigmund Gjerset 1969, xx 1970, Sverre Sørgård 1971, Sigmund Gjerset 1972, Kåre Dalhaug 1973, Sigmund Gjerset 1974, Per Indrestrand 1975, Oddvar Aarø 1976, Per Giske 1977, Sigmund Gjerset, Arild Vegsund and John Tellefsen 1978, Per Skotte 1979–81, Steinar Hildremyr 1982, Per Skotte 1983, Sigmund Gjerset and Arild Vegsund 1984, Ole Petter Aarsund 1985, Hans Magnar Engeset and Kåre Nogva 1986, Sigmund Gjerset, Svein Gjerset, Helge Uggedal and Arild Vegsund 1987, Helge Uggedal 1988–89, Per Skotte 1990, Øyvind Grytten 1991, Arne Rønstad 1992, Øystein Haugan and Malvin Alstadsæter 1993, Hans Magnar Engeset, Frode Urke and Malvin Alstadsæter 1994, Ivar Roald 1995–96, Bjarte Steinsbu and Ivar Roald 1997, Øyvind Grytten 1998, Sindre Hildre 1999–03, Øystein Haugan 2004–05, Jan Egil Alstadsæter 2006–07, Ivar Roald 2008–10; Kristian Søviknes 2011; Roger Grytten 2012; Oddmund Davik Otterlei 2013–14; Stig Jacob Johansen 2015–
