= Gjerdrum IL =

Norwegian sports club

- Full name: Gjerdrum Idrettslag
- Founded: 25 January 1920
- Ground: Gjerdrum stadion, Gjerdrum
- Manager: Kjell Alkvist
- League: Third Division
Home colours

Gjerdrum Idrettslag is a Norwegian sports club from Gjerdrum, Akershus. It has sections for association football, team handball, alpine skiing, Nordic skiing, biathlon, floorball and volleyball.

It was founded as Gjerdrum IF on 25 January 1920. In August 1940 it merged with the AIF club Gjerdrum AIL to form Gjerdrum IL.

The men's football team currently plays in the Third Division, the fourth tier of football in Norway. Its only stint at the third tier came in 1988.

Members of the skiing section include the 2014 Olympic cross-country sprint champion Maiken Caspersen Falla.
