= Sandar IL =

Norwegian sports club

- Full name: Sandar Idrettslag
- Founded: 24 September 1931
- Ground: Vesterøya Idrettspark; Sandefjord
- League: Fifth Division
- 2011: Fourth Division / Vestfold, 11th (relegated)
Home colours	Away colours

Sandar Idrettslag is a sports club from Sandefjord Municipality, Norway (it was historically located in Sandar Municipality).

It was founded on 24 September 1931 as Framnes IL, but the name Sandar IL was taken already on 13 October 1931. The club has sections for association football and handball, and the team colors are red, black and white.

Footballer Jon Midttun Lie played for Sandar IL from age 13 to age 16. In 2008 Lie's then-team Lillestrøm SK faced Sandar in the first round of the Norwegian Cup. Sandar also met another team from Tippeligaen in the first round of the cup in 2007, but lost 5–0 against Sandefjord Fotball.

The men's team played in the Third Division, the fourth tier of Norwegian football, but controversially forfeited after three games of the 2010 season. In 2011, Sandar played in the Fourth Division, but was relegated to the Fifth Division.

Terese Pedersen has played handball for Sandar.
