= Stokke IL =

Norwegian sports club

- Full name: Stokke Idrettslag
- Founded: 15 January 1931
- Ground: Stokke stadion, Stokke
- League: Fourth Division
Home colours

Stokke Idrettslag is a Norwegian sports club from Stokke, Vestfold. It has sections for association football, team handball, orienteering, gymnastics and Nordic skiing.

It was founded on 15 January 1931 as the skiing club Stokke SK. Known skiers from Stokke IL include Kristian Horntvedt., Kristoffer R. Moslet, and Sindre Stokke. The Stokke IL ski team finished third in the Norwegian national championship in 2007, held in Meråker. The squad included Sindre Stokke, Espen Harald Bjerke and Kristian Horntvedt.

The men's football team currently plays in the Fourth Division, the fifth tier of Norwegian football. It last played in the Norwegian Second Division in 1997.
