= Hauerseter SK =

Norwegian sports club

Hauerseter
- Full name: Hauerseter Sportsklubb
- Founded: 1929
- Ground: Nordkisa idrettspark Nordkisa
- League: Third Division
Home colours

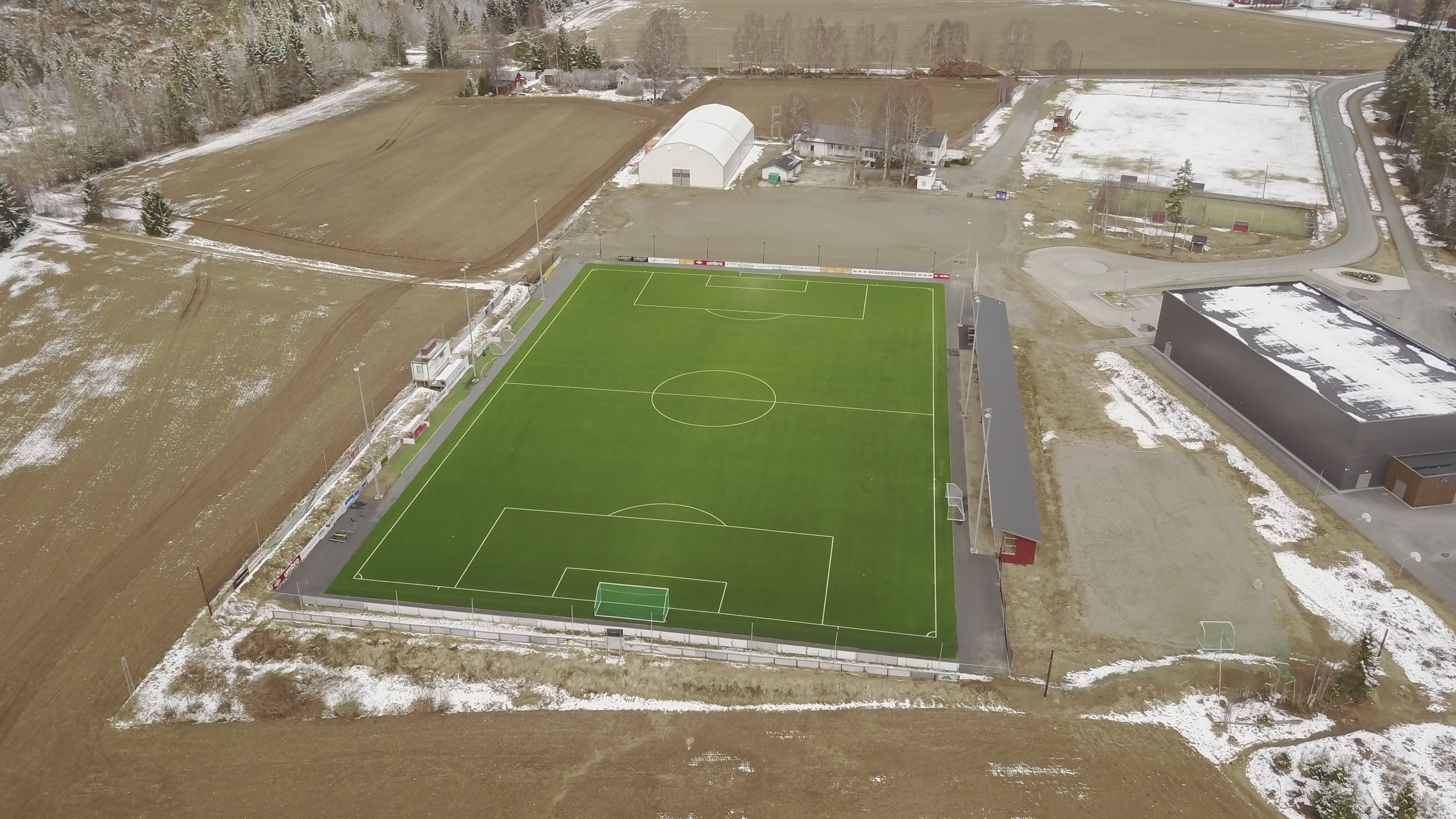
Nordkisa idrettspark

Hauerseter Sportsklubb is a Norwegian sports club from Nordkisa, Akershus. It has sections for association football, team handball, floorball, table tennis and cycling.

A club named Hauerseter SBK existed from 1922 to 1924. The current club was founded in 1929. Originally covering Hauerseter, the club also covered more of Nordkisa after the sports club there, Kisa SK, became a part of Ullensaker/Kisa IL. The club colors are red.

The men's football team currently plays in the Third Division, the fourth tier of Norwegian football. Its current stint stretches from 2012, with a highlight being the third place in 2014.
