= Rissa IL =

Rissa Idrettslag is a Norwegian sports club from Rissa

- Full name: Rissa Idrettslag
- Founded: 1920
- Ground: Langsand Stadion, Rissa, Norway
- League: 5. Divisjon
Home colours

Rissa Idrettslag is a Norwegian sports club from Rissa in Indre Fosen Municipality in Trøndelag county. It has sections for association football, team handball, gymnastics and track and field. The club was founded in 1920.
