= Bjørnevatn IL =

Norwegian sports club

- Full name: Bjørnevatn Idrettslag
- Nickname(s): B.I.L; 9910
- Founded: 1917
- Ground: Bjørneparken, Bjørnevatn
- League: Third division
- 2014: 3. Division Troms/Finnmark, 11th
Home colours

Bjørnevatn Idrettslag is a Norwegian sports club from Bjørnevatn, Finnmark. It has sections for association football and Nordic skiing.

The men's football team currently plays in the Fourth Division, having had a run from 2008 to 2010 and another single season in 2014. Before 2008 they had been absent since 1998.

== Recent history ==
Season		Pos.	Pl.	W	D	L	GS	GA	P	Cup	Notes
2007	D4	1	15	11	3	1	79	20	36	Not Qualified	
2008	D3	7	22	10	2	8	54	51	34		
2009	D3	4	20	10	2	8	43	40	32		
2010	D3	12	22	2	2	18	24	88	8	1st qualifying round	1st qualifying round
2011	D4	2	18	13	1	4	93	24	40	Not Qualified	
2012	D4	1	18	13	2	3	58	24	41	Not Qualified	Promoted
2013	D3	9	22	7	5	10	41	66	26	1st qualifying round	
2014	D3	11	22	4	2	16	28	78	14	2nd qualifying round	
2015 (in progress)	D3	5	16	6	4	6	32	30	22	2nd qualifying round	
