= Tomrefjord IL =

Norwegian sports club

Tomrefjord
- Full name: Tomrefjord Idrettslag
- Founded: 1921
- Ground: Tomrefjord stadion Tomrefjord
Home colours

Tomrefjord Idrettslag is a Norwegian sports club from Tomrefjord, founded in 1921. It has sections for association football, volleyball, cycling, gymnastics, climbing, and Nordic skiing.

The men's football team currently plays in the Fourth Division, the fifth tier of Norwegian football, having won promotion in 2015. The team formerly had a stint in the Third Division, ending in 1997. Notable former players include Bernt Hulsker.
