= Nordreisa IL =

Norwegian sports club

- Full name: Nordreisa Idrettslag
- Founded: 16 September 1946
- Ground: Storslett kunstgress, Storslett
- League: Fifth Division
Home colours

Nordreisa Idrettslag is a Norwegian sports club from Storslett, Troms, founded on 16 September 1946. It has sections for association football, team handball, orienteering, cycling, Nordic skiing, and biathlon.

The men's football team currently plays in the Fifth Division, the sixth tier of Norwegian football. It last played in the Norwegian Second Division in 1999. Former players include Odd-Karl Stangnes, Vegard Braaten and Ruben Kristiansen.
