= Tverrelvdalen IL =

Norwegian sports club

- Full name: Tverrelvdalen Idrettslag
- Founded: 22 January 1922
- Ground: Tverrelvdalen stadion, Tverrelvdalen
- League: 3. divisjon
- 2012: 3. divisjon/12, 9th
Home colours

Tverrelvdalen Idrettslag is a Norwegian sports club from Tverrelvdalen in Alta Municipality in Finnmark county. It has sections for association football, team handball and Nordic skiing.

It was founded on 22 January 1922.

The men's football team currently plays in the Third Division, the fourth tier of Norwegian football. Its current run stretches from 1998 to present.
