= Tønsberg FK =

Norwegian football club

- Full name: Tønsberg Fotballklubb
- Founded: 1985; 41 years ago
- Ground: Tønsberg Gressbane; Tønsberg
- Capacity: 3,600
- League: Fifth Division
- 2022: Fifth Division (Vestfold), 7th of 10
Home colours	Away colours

Tønsberg Fotballklubb is a Norwegian association football club from Tønsberg, Vestfold.

It was founded in 1985 as a merger between the football sections of Tønsbergs TF and IF Tønsberg-Kameratene. The team has played on the fourth or fifth tier of Norwegian football for the duration of its existence. The men's football team currently plays in the Fifth Division, the sixth tier of Norwegian football. In 2011 they withdrew their team, and was relegated from the Third Division.

On 10 October 2001, it cooperated with 19 other teams in the region to form an elite umbrella team, FK Tønsberg.
