= Kolbu KK =

Norwegian football club

- Founded: 14 December 1906
- Ground: Kolbu idrettsplass, or Kolbukameratene idrettspark, Kolbu
- League: Fourth Division
- 2024: 3rd

Kolbu KK is a Norwegian multi-sports club from Kolbu in Østre Toten Municipality. The club has sections for association football, team handball and Nordic skiing.

The club was founded in 2020 as a merger of three local clubs. Kolbu IL was founded as a skiing club on 14 December 1906, which Kolbu KK also counts as its foundation date. IL Kolbukameratene (KK) was founded to serve the upper part of Kolbu on 1 December 1935. The two clubs eventually found cooperation to be necessary. Kolbu/KK Fotball was founded as a separate club for football in 1992. In 2020, these three clubs were formally merged.

The club is best known for its ski jumpers. Their first world champion was Kenneth Gangnes, who won a gold medal in the team competition at the 2016 Ski Flying World Championships. Maren Lundby then became Olympic champion in 2018, and is considered one of Norway's greatest female ski jumpers of all time. Fredrik Bjerkeengen also raced in the World Cup on six occasions, collecting World Cup points in two of them, with his best placement being 24th from Harrachov in February 2013. Bjerkeengen was also on the podium nine times in the Continental Cup.

The men's football team currently plays in the Fourth Division, the fifth tier of football in Norway. The team was a mainstay in the Third Division from 1995 to 1998 and 2001 to 2011, followed by a singular season in 2015. The team also reached the first cup round in 2003, losing 1–5 to Lyn; and 2022, losing 1–5 to Vålerenga.

The women's football team currently plays in the Fifth Division.
