= Vuku IL =

Norwegian football club

- Full name: Vuku Idrettslag
- Founded: 1893
- Ground: Elman stadion, Vuku
- League: Fourth Division
- 2024: 3rd

Vuku Idrettslag is a Norwegian association football club from Vuku, Verdal.

The men's team currently plays in the Fourth Division, the fifth tier of Norwegian football. The team played in the Third Division from 1993 to 1996, then for a single season in 2000, before another stint from 2006 to 2011.

The team is known for its appearances in the Norwegian Cup. In 1993, the team faced reigning league champions Rosenborg BK and lost 0–15. The official attendance was 1,950. The player Jon Olav Hjelde was brought from Vuku to Rosenborg. In the 2015 Norwegian Cup, Vuku again faced Rosenborg and only lost 0–3.

The women's team currently plays in the Fourth Division.
