= Stathelle og Omegn IL =

Stathelle
- Full name: Stathelle og Omegn Idrettslag
- Founded: 1929
- Ground: Bunes Stadion
- Capacity: 3500
- Chairman: John Arne Nilsen
- Coach: Fredrik Arnulf
- League: 4. divisjon
colors	colors

Stathelle og Omegn Idrettslag (founded in 1929) is a sports club from the town of Stathelle in Bamble Municipality, Norway. The men's senior football team plays in the 4th Division, after being relegated from the 3rd Division at the end of the 2010 season.
