= Lyngbø SK =

Norwegian football club

- Full name: Lyngbø Sportsklubb
- Founded: 4 May 1932
- Ground: Lyngbø idrettspark, Bergen
- League: Third Division
- 2024, 4.div.: 1st

Lyngbø Sportsklubb is a Norwegian multi-sports club from Laksevåg, Bergen. It has sections for association football and team handball, and has formerly had sections for volleyball, orienteering and athletics.

The men's football team plays in the Third Division, the fourth tier of Norwegian football. After playing on the third tier, Lyngbø was relegated in 1992 and had stints in the Third Division from 1993–1996, 1998–2010 and 2014–2016. Winning their Fourth Division group in 2021, they contested a playoff for promotion, but succumbed to their opposition. In 2023, they finished second in their group, and after winning their group in the 2024 Fourth Division, Lyngbø were promoted without needing to go through playoff.

The women's football team plays in the Third Division, finishing second in their group in 2024.
