= Trøgstad/Båstad FK =

Norwegian football club

Trøgstad/Båstad
- Full name: Trøgstad/Båstad Fotballklubb
- Founded: 2001
- Ground: Trøgstad stadion, Skjønhaug
Home colours

Trøgstad/Båstad Fotballklubb is a Norwegian association football club from Trøgstad, Østfold.

The men's football team currently plays in the Third Division, the fourth tier of Norwegian football. It last played in the Norwegian Second Division in 1999. Players in the 2000s include Toomas Tohver and Andrei Mazurkevitš.

It was originally a cooperation between the football departments of Trøgstad IL and Båstad IL, and they were merged to form their own club on 11 June 2001. Its home field is Trøgstad stadion, and its team colors are yellow and blue.
