= SK Nord =

Norwegian sports club

- Full name: Sportsklubben Nord
- Founded: 1932
- Ground: Nord stadion
- Manager: Simon Balm (2021)
- League: Fourth Division
Home colours

Sportsklubben Nord is a Norwegian sports club from Karmøy Municipality. Founded in 1932, it has sections for association football and team handball.

The men's football team currently plays in the Fourth Division, the fifth tier of Norwegian football. It is coached by Simon Balm.
