= Kautokeino IL =

Norwegian sports club

- Full name: Kautokeino Idrettslag
- Founded: 1938
- Ground: Baktevarre, Kautokeino
- League: First Division
Home colours

Kautokeino Idrettslag is a Norwegian sports club from Kautokeino Municipality in Finnmark county. It has sections for association football, team handball, floorball and Nordic skiing.

The men's football team currently plays in the Third Division, the fourth tier of Norwegian football. Their current run stretches from 1996 to present. The club has also sent players to the Sápmi football team.

The floorball team is currently heading the 2nd Division.
