= Hareid IL =

Norwegian football club

- Full name: Hareid Idrettslag
- Founded: 28 December 1922
- Ground: Hareid stadion, Hareid
- League: Fourth Division
- 2024: 7th

Hareid Idrettslag is a Norwegian multi-sports club from Hareid Municipality in Møre og Romsdal county. It has sections for association football, team handball, gymnastics and track and field.

The club was founded as Hareid Turnlag on 28 December 1922, only practicing gymnastics. Sections for football, handball and athletics were added after World War II, and the club name changed to reflect its multi-sport status. The club saw the most success in both football and athletics in the 1980s.

The men's football team plays in the Fourth Division, the fifth tier of Norwegian football. After playing on the third tier, Hareid was relegated in 1992 and had lengthy stints in the Third Division (the fourth tier) from 1993 to 1998 and 2001 to 2010.

The women's football team plays in the Fifth Division.

Among its most accomplished footballers are Fredrik Aursnes. Within athletics, middle-distance runner Trine Pilskog represented Hareid IL. She competed at the European Championships, Olympic Games and World Championships.
