= Nordhordland BK =

Norwegian football club

- Full name: Nordhordland Ballklubb
- Nickname: NBK
- Founded: 10 December 1979
- Ground: Knarvik stadion, Knarvik
- Capacity: Over 1,000
- Chairman: Thomas Rønn Aar
- Manager: Arild Helland
- League: Fifth division (men) / Third division (women)
- 2019: MEN: Fifth Division/ Hordaland 12th Women: Third division Hordaland, 4th
Home colours	Away colours

Nordhordland Ballklubb is a Norwegian football club.

It was created in 1979 as a merger of the football sections of three local clubs, Knarvik IL, Seim IL and IL Alvidra. The team is located in Knarvik about 25 minutes' drive from Bergen.

The men's part of the club plays in the 4th Division, the fifth-highest tier of football in Norway. It last played in the 3rd Division in 2010. It is the second best club in Vestland behind Brann.
