= Varhaug IL =

Norwegian sports club

Home colours

Varhaug Idrettslag (Varhaug IL or VIL) is the main sports club for people living in the village of Varhaug, Norway, and was established on 1 August 1932. The club caters for a wide range of sports and activities with the most popular being football and handball.

Varhaug IL owns an area in the eastern part of Varhaug, called Varhaug Idrettspark, which is the venue for most of the sports. It was decided, in October 2007, not to proceed with the construction of a municipal swimming pool. At the club's AGM in 2007, it was agreed that the sports facilities would be developed including a multi-purpose hall. This was reaffirmed at an EGM in 2008. However, because of dissatisfaction with the way that Chairman Paul Skretting was handling negotiations with the municipality, six of the seven board members resigned, and were replaced, shortly before Christmas 2009.

The Varhaug football team will in the 2011 season play at tier five after being relegated in 2010, though in the past it has played at tier two. It qualified for the Norwegian Cup in 1982 and 1997. The woman's handball team, though presently playing in tier 3, competed in Division 1 (tier 2) in season 2007–08. They did, though, have a difficult time in their sole season in that division, losing their first eight matches. Likewise, the men's handball team also plays in tier 3.
