= Sørumsand IF =

Norwegian sports club

- Full name: Sørumsand Idrettsforening
- Founded: 21 November 1917
- Ground: Idrettsparken, Sørumsand
- Manager: Jørn Harethon
- League: Third Division
Home colours

Sørumsand Idrettsforening is a Norwegian sports club from Sørumsand, founded on 21 November 1917. It has sections for association football, team handball and skiing.

The men's football team currently plays in the Third Division, the fourth tier of football in Norway.
