= Vardeneset BK =

Norwegian football club

- Full name: Vardeneset Ballklubb
- Founded: 22 November 1990
- Ground: Vardeneset kunstgress Tasta
- League: Third Division
Home colours

Vardeneset Ballklubb is a Norwegian association football club from Stavanger.

The club was founded on 22 November 1990 when it split from the multi-sports club Vardeneset IF, founded in 1975. The club colours are white and red.

The men's football team currently plays in the Third Division, the fourth tier of Norwegian football. The team has had a long stint in the Third Division, running since 2001.
