= 2002 Norwegian Third Division =

Norwegian football league season

The 2002 season of the 3. divisjon, the fourth highest association football league for men in Norway.

22 games were played in 24 groups, with three points given for a win and one point for a draw. Twelve teams were promoted to the 2. divisjon through playoff.

== Tables ==
Group 1

1. Sarpsborg – lost playoff
2. Sparta
3. Årvoll (-> Groruddalen BK)
4. Hellerud
5. Fredrikstad 2
6. Råde
7. Skeid 2
8. Kvik Halden 2
9. Grüner
10. Ullern
11. Borgen – relegated
12. Vestli – relegated

Group 2

1. Borg Fotball – won playoff
2. Østsiden
3. Fagerborg
4. Rakkestad
5. Vålerenga 2
6. Kolbotn
7. Oppegård
8. Selbak
9. Oslo Øst 2
10. Lisleby
11. Torp
12. Rolvsøy – relegated

Group 3

1. Mercantile – won playoff
2. Trøgstad/Båstad
3. KFUM
4. Moss 2
5. Drøbak/Frogn
6. Follo 2
7. Spydeberg
8. Greåker
9. Bækkelaget
10. Nordstrand
11. Rygge – relegated
12. Skjeberg – relegated

Group 4

1. Grei – lost playoff
2. Fossum
3. Grorud
4. Bjerke
5. Lørenskog 2
6. Nittedal
7. Røa
8. Focus
9. Fjellhamar
10. Kjelsås 2
11. Rælingen
12. Holmen – relegated

Group 5

1. Lillestrøm 2 – won playoff
2. Sander
3. Strømmen
4. Funnefoss/Vormsund
5. Galterud
6. Grue
7. Sørumsand
8. Aurskog/Finstadbru
9. Skjetten 2
10. Kongsvinger 2
11. Høland
12. Eidskog – relegated

Group 6

1. Brumunddal – lost playoff
2. Lom
3. Ham-Kam 2
4. Vang
5. Trysil
6. Follebu
7. Fart
8. Hamar
9. Ringebu/Fåvang
10. Ringsaker
11. Elverum 2 – relegated
12. Kvam – relegated

Group 7

1. Gjøvik-Lyn – won playoff
2. Vardal
3. Hønefoss BK 2
4. Raufoss 2
5. Jevnaker
6. SAFK Fagernes
7. Toten
8. Kolbu/KK
9. Vind
10. Søndre Land
11. FF Lillehammer 2 – relegated
12. Lunner – relegated

Group 8

1. Mjøndalen – lost playoff
2. Asker
3. Birkebeineren
4. Eik-Tønsberg
5. Flint
6. Åssiden
7. Falk
8. Ørn-Horten 2
9. Borre
10. Skiold
11. Tønsberg FK – relegated
12. Slemmestad – relegated

Group 9

1. Strømsgodset 2
2. Runar – won playoff
3. Larvik Turn
4. Åmot
5. Stokke
6. Teie
7. Vestfossen
8. Tjølling
9. Hønefoss SK
10. Larvik Fotball 2
11. Siljan – relegated
12. Kongsberg – relegated

Group 10

1. Odd Grenland 2 – won playoff
2. Pors Grenland 2
3. Trauma
4. Skotfoss
5. Notodden
6. Urædd
7. Langesund/Stathelle
8. Brevik
9. Seljord
10. Drangedal
11. Herkules – relegated

Group 11

1. FK Arendal – lost playoff
2. Lyngdal
3. Vindbjart
4. Vigør
5. Flekkerøy
6. Våg
7. Donn
8. Flekkefjord
9. Start 2
10. Søgne
11. Rygene – relegated
12. Kvinesdal – relegated

Group 12

1. Ålgård – won playoff
2. Sandnes FK
3. Eiger
4. Hundvåg
5. Bryne 2
6. Egersund
7. Hana
8. Staal
9. Figgjo
10. Sola
11. Havørn – relegated
12. Orre – relegated

Group 13

1. Vaulen – lost playoff
2. Åkra
3. Haugesund 2
4. Vardeneset
5. Kopervik
6. Ulf-Sandnes
7. Buøy
8. Torvastad
9. Vedavåg Karmøy
10. Randaberg
11. Grannekameratene – relegated
12. Tasta – relegated

Group 14

1. Trott – lost playoff
2. Lyngbø
3. Stord/Moster
4. Os
5. Trio
6. Ny-Krohnborg
7. Gneist
8. Hald
9. Sandviken
10. Bremnes
11. Bergen Nord
12. Djerv – relegated

Group 15

1. Hovding – won playoff
2. Askøy
3. Follese
4. Radøy/Manger
5. Vadmyra
6. Varegg
7. Voss
8. Austevoll
9. Arna-Bjørnar
10. Trane
11. Osterøy – relegated
12. Nymark – relegated

Group 16

1. Jotun – lost playoff
2. Stryn
3. Sogndal 2
4. Høyang
5. Sandane
6. Saga
7. Fjøra
8. Florø
9. Dale – relegated
10. Eid – relegated
11. Årdalstangen/Lærdal – relegated
12. Jølster – relegated

Group 17

1. Bergsøy – lost playoff
2. Volda
3. Aalesund 2
4. Ørsta
5. Brattvåg
6. Ha/No
7. Hareid
8. Velledalen og Ringen – relegated
9. Stordal
10. Stranda – relegated
11. Vigra – relegated
12. Ellingsøy – relegated

Group 18

1. Averøykameratene – won playoff
2. Sunndal
3. Bryn
4. Gossen
5. Midsund
6. Surnadal
7. Molde 3
8. Kristiansund
9. Åndalsnes
10. Ekko/Aureosen – relegated
11. Bud
12. Dahle/Clausenengen 2

Group 19

1. Nardo – lost playoff
2. Kolstad
3. Ranheim
4. Tynset
5. Orkla
6. Rissa
7. Flå
8. Løkken – relegated
9. Buvik
10. Melhus
11. Byåsen 2 – relegated
12. Tiller – relegated

Group 20

1. Nidelv – won playoff
2. Namsos
3. Stjørdals-Blink
4. NTNUI
5. Selbu
6. Malvik
7. Strindheim 2
8. Beitstad
9. Rørvik
10. Vinne
11. Bangsund – relegated
12. Kvik – relegated

Group 21

1. Steigen – lost playoff
2. Innstranden
3. Fauske/Sprint
4. Mosjøen
5. Bodø/Glimt 2
6. Stålkameratene
7. Brønnøysund
8. Tverlandet – relegated
9. Nesna
10. Sandnessjøen
11. Nordre Meløy
12. Leirfjord – relegated

Group 22

1. Narvik – won playoff
2. Grovfjord
3. Melbo
4. Morild
5. Ballstad
6. Skånland
7. Leknes
8. Bjerkvik
9. Ballangen
10. Medkila
11. Beisfjord – relegated
12. Høken – relegated

Group 23

1. Lyngen/Karnes – lost playoff
2. Ramfjord
3. Finnsnes
4. Senja
5. Tromsø 2
6. Fløya
7. Tromsdalen 2
8. Nordreisa
9. Bardu
10. Ringvassøy – relegated
11. Kvaløysletta – relegated
12. Nordkjosbotn – relegated

Group 24

1. Bossekop – won playoff
2. Porsanger
3. Kautokeino
4. Kirkenes
5. Tverrelvdalen
6. Honningsvåg
7. Båtsfjord
8. Nordkinn
9. Polarstjernen
10. Rafsbotn
11. Nordlys
12. Nerskogen – relegated
