= 2004 Norwegian Third Division =

Norwegian football league season

The 2004 season of the 3. divisjon, the fourth highest association football league for men in Norway.

22 games were played in 24 groups, with 3 points given for wins and 1 for draws. Twelve teams were promoted to the 2. divisjon through playoff.

== Tables ==
Group 1

1. Sarpsborg – won playoff
2. Fredrikstad 2
3. Østsiden
4. Sparta Sarpsborg 2
5. Lisleby
6. Moss 2
7. Kvik Halden 2
8. Greåker
9. Kolbotn
10. Klemetsrud
11. Navestad – relegated
12. Oppegård – relegated

Group 2

1. KFUM – lost playoff
2. Årvoll
3. Rygge
4. Sprint-Jeløy 2
5. Follo 2
6. Råde
7. Trøgstad/Båstad
8. Selbak
9. Rakkestad
10. Fagerborg
11. Askim – relegated
12. Spydeberg – relegated

Group 3

1. Strømmen – lost playoff
2. Grei
3. Lyn 2
4. Fet
5. Bygdø
6. Kjelsås 2
7. Grorud
8. Fjellhamar
9. Nittedal
10. Focus – relegated
11. Grüner
12. Kurland – relegated

Group 4

1. Jevnaker – lost playoff
2. Korsvoll
3. Åmot
4. Hønefoss SK
5. St. Hanshaugen
6. Konnerud
7. Åskollen
8. Hadeland
9. Mercantile 2
10. Hønefoss BK 2
11. Røa
12. Nordstrand – relegated

Group 5

1. Groruddalen – won playoff
2. Kongsvinger 2
3. Sander
4. Skeid 2
5. Høland
6. Galterud
7. Sørumsand
8. Grue
9. Rælingen
10. Funnefoss/Vormsund
11. Rasta – relegated
12. Leirsund – relegated

Group 6

1. Brumunddal – won playoff
2. Ham-Kam 2
3. Hamar
4. Ringsaker
5. Bjerke
6. Fart
7. Eidsvold
8. Skjetten 2 – relegated
9. Trysil
10. Vang
11. Ottestad
12. Furnes – relegated

Group 7

1. Raufoss 2
2. FF Lillehammer – won playoff
3. Kolbu/KK
4. Vardal
5. Lom
6. SAFK Fagernes
7. Ringebu/Fåvang
8. Ihle
9. Vind
10. Toten
11. Vågå – relegated
12. Follebu – relegated

Group 8

1. Mjøndalen – lost playoff
2. Vålerenga 2
3. Asker
4. Fossum
5. Ullern
6. Drafn
7. Birkebeineren
8. Åssiden
9. Strømsgodset 2
10. Solberg
11. Øvrevoll/Hosle
12. Bækkelaget – relegated

Group 9

1. Eik-Tønsberg – lost playoff
2. Larvik Turn
3. Runar
4. Holmestrand
5. Flint
6. Ivrig
7. Borre
8. Stokke
9. Sandar
10. Larvik Fotball 2
11. Ørn-Horten 2 – relegated
12. Falk – relegated

Group 10

1. Notodden – won playoff
2. Langesund/Stathelle
3. Skarphedin
4. Pors Grenland 2
5. Herkules
6. Odd Grenland 3
7. Urædd
8. Brevik
9. Skotfoss
10. Fyresdal
11. Drangedal – relegated
12. Seljord – relegated

Group 11

1. Flekkerøy – won playoff
2. Lyngdal
3. Jerv
4. Vindbjart
5. Start 2
6. Våg
7. Søgne
8. Grane
9. Mandalskameratene 2
10. Vigør
11. Randesund – relegated
12. Trauma – relegated

Group 12

1. Bryne 2
2. Randaberg – lost playoff
3. Vaulen
4. Buøy
5. Sola
6. Vardeneset
7. Varhaug
8. Staal Jørpeland
9. Frøyland
10. Figgjo
11. Madla – relegated
12. Riska – relegated

Group 13

1. Egersund – won playoff
2. Kopervik
3. Haugesund 2
4. Åkra
5. Nord
6. Skjold
7. Eiger
8. Havørn
9. Bjerkreim
10. Hundvåg
11. Hana – relegated
12. Torvastad – relegated

Group 14

1. Stord/Moster – won playoff
2. Os
3. Gneist
4. Lyngbø
5. Bremnes
6. Austevoll
7. Trio
8. Solid
9. Halsnøy
10. Trott
11. Fitjar – relegated
12. Tertnes – relegated

Group 15

1. Nest-Sotra – lost playoff
2. Askøy
3. Radøy/Manger
4. Varegg
5. Vadmyra
6. Arna-Bjørnar
7. Voss
8. Follese
9. Frøya
10. Hald
11. Bergen Nord – relegated
12. Bergen Sparta – relegated

Group 16

1. Førde – lost playoff
2. Stryn
3. Fjøra
4. Tornado Måløy
5. Sogndal 2
6. Saga – relegated (voluntarily)
7. Skavøypoll
8. Høyang
9. Florø
10. Sandane
11. Dale
12. Eid – relegated

Group 17

1. Skarbøvik – lost playoff
2. Valder
3. Bergsøy
4. Langevåg
5. Sykkylven
6. Hareid
7. Aalesund 2
8. Spjelkavik
9. Ørsta
10. Godøy – relegated
11. Brattvåg – relegated
12. Hødd 2 – relegated

Group 18

1. Træff – won playoff
2. Kristiansund
3. Averøykameratene
4. Surnadal
5. Sunndal
6. Gossen
7. Dahle
8. Bud
9. Bryn
10. Eide og Omegn
11. Åndalsnes
12. Halsa/Valsøyfjord – relegated

Group 19

1. Ranheim – won playoff
2. Nardo
3. Orkla
4. Tynset
5. KIL/Hemne
6. Flå
7. Nidelv 2 – relegated
8. Melhus
9. Kvik
10. Buvik
11. Røros – relegated
12. Sokna – relegated

Group 20

1. Stjørdals-Blink – lost playoff
2. Rørvik
3. Verdal
4. Namsos
5. Strindheim 2
6. Fram
7. Bjørgan
8. Malvik
9. Beitstad – relegated
10. NTNUI
11. Selbu
12. Rissa

Group 21

1. Innstranden – won playoff
2. Steigen
3. Stålkameratene
4. Mo 2
5. Fauske/Sprint
6. Mosjøen
7. Bodø/Glimt 2
8. Saltdalkameratene
9. Brønnøysund
10. Junkeren
11. Nordre Meløy
12. Herøy/Dønna

Group 22

1. Grovfjord – lost playoff
2. Leknes
3. Ballstad
4. Skånland
5. Hadsel
6. Morild
7. Ballangen
8. Medkila
9. Landsås – relegated
10. Sandtorg – relegated
11. Vesterålen 2 – relegated
12. Bjerkvik – relegated

Group 23

1. Lyngen/Karnes – won playoff
2. Tromsø 2
3. Tromsdalen 2
4. Ishavsbyen
5. Ramfjord
6. Fløya
7. Senja
8. Nordreisa
9. Skjervøy
10. Storsteinnes
11. Finnsnes – relegated
12. Nordkjosbotn – relegated

Group 24

1. Bossekop – lost playoff
2. Kirkenes
3. Hammerfest
4. Kautokeino
5. Tverrelvdalen
6. Båtsfjord
7. Sørøy/Glimt
8. Porsanger
9. Alta 2
10. Norild
11. Polarstjernen – relegated
12. Rafsbotn – relegated
