= 1998 in Norwegian football =

Football in Norway
- Season: 1998

Men's football
- Tippeligaen: Rosenborg
- 1. divisjon: Odd Grenland
- 2. divisjon: L/F Hønefoss FB (Group 1); Skjetten (Group 2); Ørn-Horten (Group 3); Vidar (Group 4); Fyllingen (Group 5); Clausenengen (Group 6); Rosenborg 2 (Group 7); Lofoten (Group 8)
- Cupen: Stabæk

Women's football
- Toppserien: Asker
- Cupen: Trondheims-Ørn

Results from Norwegian football in 1998.

== Men's football ==
=== League season ===
==== Tippeligaen ====
Pos	Team	Pld	W	D	L	GF	GA	GD	Pts	Qualification or relegation
1	Rosenborg (C)	26	20	3	3	79	23	+56	63	Qualification for the Champions League group stage
2	Molde	26	16	6	4	70	34	+36	54	Qualification for the Champions League second qualifying round
3	Stabæk	26	16	5	5	63	29	+34	53	Qualification for the UEFA Cup first round (Note: Stabæk qualified for the UEFA Cup as Norwegian Cup winners.)
4	Viking	26	14	4	8	66	44	+22	46	Qualification for the UEFA Cup qualifying round (Note: Bodø/Glimt qualified for the UEFA Cup qualifying round through their Fair play ranking.)
5	Bodø/Glimt	26	9	9	8	47	47	0	36	Qualification for the UEFA Cup qualifying round
6	Brann	26	9	8	9	44	39	+5	35	Qualification for the Intertoto Cup second round
7	Vålerenga	26	10	3	13	44	48	−4	33	Qualification for the Intertoto Cup first round
8	Lillestrøm	26	9	6	11	41	49	−8	33	
9	Moss	26	10	2	14	36	55	−19	32	
10	Strømsgodset	26	9	5	12	40	61	−21	32	
11	Tromsø	26	7	7	12	39	48	−9	28	
12	Kongsvinger (O)	26	7	5	14	35	59	−24	26	Qualification for the relegation play-offs
13	Haugesund (R)	26	6	5	15	41	55	−14	23	Relegation to First Division
14	Sogndal (R)	26	4	4	18	26	80	−54	16	Relegation to First Division

Source: fotball.no
Rules for classification: 1) points; 2) goal difference; 3) number of goals scored.
(C) Champions; (O) Play-off winners; (R) Relegated

===== Top scorers =====
27 goals:

- Sigurd Rushfeldt, Rosenborg

20 goals:

- Rune Lange, Tromsø

19 goals:

- Petter Belsvik, Stabæk
- Jostein Flo, Strømsgodset

16 goals:

- Andreas Lund, Molde

15 goals:

- Rikhardur Dadason, Viking

14 goals:

- Jahn Ivar Jakobsen, Rosenborg

12 goals:

- Kjetil Løvvik, Brann
- Raymond Kvisvik, Brann/Moss
- Roar Strand, Rosenborg

11 goals:

- Odd Inge Olsen, Molde
- Christian Flindt Bjerg, Viking

===== Average attendance =====
- Rosenborg: 13 164
- Brann: 8 976
- Molde: 8 516
- Vålerenga: 7 865
- Viking: 5 692
- Strømsgodset: 4 363
- Haugesund: 3 950
- Lillestrøm: 3 871
- Bodø/Glimt: 3 491
- Stabæk: 3 397
- Tromsø: 3 394
- Moss: 2 884
- Kongsvinger: 2 505
- Sogndal: 1 482
- Total average: 5 254 (Total: 956 151)

==== 1. divisjon ====
Pos	Team	Pld	W	D	L	GF	GA	GD	Pts	Promotion, qualification or relegation
1	Odd Grenland (C, P)	26	16	7	3	55	18	+37	55	Promotion to Tippeligaen
2	Skeid (P)	26	13	5	8	40	37	+3	44	Promotion to Tippeligaen
3	Kjelsås	26	11	8	7	43	34	+9	41	Qualification for the promotion play-offs
4	Byåsen	26	12	4	10	38	30	+8	40	
5	Start	26	11	6	9	37	29	+8	39	
6	Bryne	26	12	3	11	46	42	+4	39	
7	Hødd	26	12	2	12	40	45	−5	38	
8	Raufoss	26	11	4	11	35	43	−8	37	
9	Lyn	26	9	9	8	44	26	+18	36	
10	Eik-Tønsberg	26	9	8	9	39	35	+4	35	
11	Aalesund (R)	26	10	4	12	26	41	−15	34	Relegation to Second Division
12	Strindheim (R)	26	8	8	10	37	37	0	32	Relegation to Second Division
13	Ullern (R)	26	6	3	17	26	55	−29	21	Relegation to Second Division
14	HamKam (R)	26	6	1	19	30	64	−34	19	Relegation to Second Division

Source: nifs.no
Rules for classification: 1) points; 2) goal difference; 3) number of goals scored.
(C) Champions; (P) Promoted; (R) Relegated

==== 2. divisjon ====
===== Group 1 =====
Pos	Team	Pld	W	D	L	GF	GA	GD	Pts	Promotion or relegation
1	Liv/Fossekallen (P)	22	16	4	2	51	14	+37	52	Promotion to First Division
2	Årvoll	22	12	4	6	60	39	+21	40	
3	Lyn 2	22	11	4	7	47	35	+12	37	
4	Faaberg	22	11	3	8	46	37	+9	36	
5	Lillestrøm 2	22	10	5	7	46	35	+11	35	
6	Sprint-Jeløy	22	10	5	7	46	42	+4	35	
7	Drøbak/Frogn	22	10	1	11	38	40	−2	31	
8	Jevnaker	22	7	7	8	31	35	−4	28	
9	Gjøvik-Lyn	22	7	7	8	36	41	−5	28	
10	Strømmen (R)	22	6	3	13	34	52	−18	21	Relegation to Third Division
11	Jotun (R)	22	5	3	14	30	61	−31	18	Relegation to Third Division
12	Bjerke (R)	22	1	6	15	24	58	−34	9	Relegation to Third Division

(P) Promoted; (R) Relegated

===== Group 2 =====
Pos	Team	Pld	W	D	L	GF	GA	GD	Pts	Promotion or relegation
1	Skjetten (P)	22	16	2	4	58	20	+38	50	Promotion to First Division
2	Sarpsborg	22	16	2	4	57	26	+31	50	
3	Stabæk 2	22	13	1	8	52	43	+9	40	
4	Grei	22	10	4	8	33	32	+1	34	
5	Bærum	22	11	0	11	57	49	+8	33	
6	Lørenskog	22	10	3	9	35	35	0	33	
7	Abildsø	22	10	1	11	43	52	−9	31	
8	Elverum	22	9	2	11	43	46	−3	29	
9	Nybergsund	22	8	4	10	33	31	+2	28	
10	Fossum (R)	22	7	4	11	39	41	−2	25	Relegation to Third Division
11	Rakkestad (R)	22	7	4	11	39	49	−10	25	Relegation to Third Division
12	Ham-Kam 2 (R)	22	1	1	20	15	80	−65	4	Relegation to Third Division

(P) Promoted; (R) Relegated

===== Group 3 =====
Pos	Team	Pld	W	D	L	GF	GA	GD	Pts	Relegation
1	Ørn-Horten	22	14	5	3	67	34	+33	47	
2	Fredrikstad	22	14	5	3	47	17	+30	47	
3	Sandefjord	22	11	7	4	41	29	+12	40	
4	Runar	22	8	10	4	45	29	+16	34	
5	Vålerenga 2	22	9	6	7	58	46	+12	33	
6	Ski	22	9	6	7	39	37	+2	33	
7	Råde	22	10	2	10	47	50	−3	32	
8	Drafn	22	6	8	8	42	56	−14	26	
9	Østsiden	22	7	4	11	41	47	−6	25	
10	Mjøndalen (R)	22	6	6	10	38	42	−4	24	Relegation to Third Division
11	Larvik Turn (R)	22	3	4	15	26	56	−30	13	Relegation to Third Division
12	Åssiden (R)	22	1	5	16	25	73	−48	8	Relegation to Third Division

(R) Relegated

===== Group 4 =====
Pos	Team	Pld	W	D	L	GF	GA	GD	Pts	Relegation
1	Vidar	22	13	7	2	65	30	+35	46	
2	Pors Grenland	22	11	4	7	48	30	+18	37	
3	Mandalskameratene	22	9	9	4	41	26	+15	36	
4	Haugesund 2	22	10	4	8	59	48	+11	34	
5	Sandnes	22	8	8	6	31	29	+2	32	
6	Sola	22	9	5	8	30	39	−9	32	
7	Ålgård	22	8	7	7	35	44	−9	31	
8	Flekkefjord	22	6	11	5	38	33	+5	29	
9	Randaberg	22	7	8	7	45	41	+4	29	
10	Eiger (R)	22	6	5	11	22	42	−20	23	Relegation to Third Division
11	Jerv (R)	22	5	6	11	34	47	−13	21	Relegation to Third Division
12	Klepp (R)	22	1	4	17	31	70	−39	7	Relegation to Third Division

(R) Relegated

===== Group 5 =====
Pos	Team	Pld	W	D	L	GF	GA	GD	Pts	Relegation
1	Fyllingen	22	17	4	1	69	23	+46	55	
2	Åsane	22	17	2	3	59	27	+32	53	
3	Stord	22	10	5	7	46	35	+11	35	
4	Fana	22	10	4	8	42	33	+9	34	
5	Brann 2	22	9	5	8	40	36	+4	32	
6	Vard Haugesund	22	9	4	9	42	41	+1	31	
7	Os	22	8	5	9	44	49	−5	29	
8	Førde	22	9	2	11	36	41	−5	29	
9	Sogndal 2	22	7	2	13	33	61	−28	23	
10	Stryn (R)	22	6	3	13	34	47	−13	21	Relegation to Third Division
11	Nest-Sotra (R)	22	4	5	13	29	52	−23	17	Relegation to Third Division
12	Vedavåg (R)	22	4	3	15	39	68	−29	15	Relegation to Third Division

(R) Relegated

===== Group 6 =====
Pos	Team	Pld	W	D	L	GF	GA	GD	Pts	Promotion or relegation
1	Clausenengen (P)	22	15	5	2	69	20	+49	50	Promotion to First Division
2	Molde 2	22	12	2	8	58	31	+27	38	
3	Skarbøvik	22	10	7	5	39	29	+10	37	
4	Verdal	22	11	3	8	49	41	+8	36	
5	Steinkjer	22	9	5	8	40	39	+1	32	
6	Averøykameratene	22	8	8	6	34	40	−6	32	
7	Orkdal/Orkanger	22	7	7	8	33	42	−9	28	
8	Volda	22	8	2	12	41	47	−6	26	
9	Træff	22	7	4	11	28	45	−17	25	
10	Kristiansund (R)	22	7	2	13	30	44	−14	23	Relegation to Third Division
11	Åndalsnes (R)	22	6	5	11	30	50	−20	23	Relegation to Third Division
12	Aalesund 2 (R)	45	8	11	26	49	–23	—	35	Relegation to Third Division

(P) Promoted; (R) Relegated

===== Group 7 =====
Pos	Team	Pld	W	D	L	GF	GA	GD	Pts	Relegation
1	Rosenborg 2	22	15	4	3	71	24	+47	49	
2	Mo	22	15	3	4	47	33	+14	48	
3	Narvik	22	12	6	4	38	23	+15	42	
4	Kolstad	22	12	2	8	54	47	+7	38	
5	Bodø/Glimt 2	22	11	4	7	48	39	+9	37	
6	Ranheim	22	9	7	6	52	42	+10	34	
7	Nardo	22	9	3	10	39	40	−1	30	
8	Gevir Bodø	22	5	9	8	45	48	−3	24	
9	Mosjøen	22	6	5	11	35	46	−11	23	
10	Bangsund (R)	22	5	4	13	22	47	−25	19	Relegation to Third Division
11	Nationalkam (R)	22	3	5	14	37	63	−26	14	Relegation to Third Division
12	Stjørdals/Blink (R)	22	4	0	18	36	72	−36	12	Relegation to Third Division

(R) Relegated

===== Group 8 =====
Pos	Team	Pld	W	D	L	GF	GA	GD	Pts	Promotion or relegation
1	Lofoten (P)	22	19	2	1	82	36	+46	59	Promotion to First Division
2	Tromsdalen	22	15	3	4	60	24	+36	48	
3	Harstad	22	14	5	3	63	24	+39	47	
4	Alta	22	13	3	6	92	40	+52	42	
5	Hammerfest	22	9	6	7	53	53	0	33	
6	Skjervøy	22	10	2	10	52	52	0	32	
7	Finnsnes	22	9	3	10	40	39	+1	30	
8	Lyngen/Karnes	22	7	5	10	45	65	−20	26	
9	Silsand/Omegn	22	6	1	15	41	65	−24	19	
10	Ulfstind (R)	22	5	3	14	35	64	−29	18	Relegation to Third Division
11	Morild (R)	22	4	5	13	30	64	−34	17	Relegation to Third Division
12	Polarstjernen (R)	22	1	2	19	28	95	−67	5	Relegation to Third Division

(P) Promoted; (R) Relegated

===== Play-offs =====
1st leg

- October 3: Skjetten – Ørn-Horten 4–1
- October 4: Clausenengen – Mo 5–1
- Liv/Fossekallen – Fyllingen 2–1
- Vidar – Lofoten 2–1

2nd leg

- October 10: Fyllingen – Liv/Fossekallen 1–4 (agg. 2–6)
- Ørn-Horten – Skjetten 3–1 (agg. 4–5)
- October 11: Lofoten – Vidar 3–1 (agg. 4–3)
- Mo – Clausenengen 1–1 (agg. 2–6)

Clausenengen, Liv/Fossekallen, Lofoten and Skjetten promoted.

=== Norwegian Cup ===
==== Final ====
1 November 1998
13:15 CET (UTC+1)

Stabæk	3–1 (a.e.t.)	Rosenborg
Sigurðsson 6', 106'; Finstad 98'	Report	Rushfeldt 65' (pen.)

Ullevaal Stadion, Oslo
Attendance: 23,251
Referee: Rune Pedersen (Sprint/Jeløy)

== Women's football ==
=== League season ===
==== Toppserien ====
Pos	Team	Pld	W	D	L	GF	GA	GD	Pts	Relegation
1	Asker (C)	18	18	0	0	79	14	+65	54	
2	Trondheims-Ørn	18	12	4	2	58	24	+34	40	
3	Athene Moss	18	9	3	6	47	34	+13	30	
4	Kolbotn	18	9	2	7	40	32	+8	29	
5	Sandviken	18	8	4	6	27	25	+2	28	
6	Klepp	18	8	3	7	36	31	+5	27	
7	Setskog/Høland	18	6	3	9	51	57	−6	21	
8	Bjørnar	18	5	5	8	31	38	−7	20	
9	Fløya (R)	18	1	3	14	14	72	−58	6	Relegation to First Division
10	Byåsen (R)	18	0	1	17	14	70	−56	1	Relegation to First Division

Source: nifs.no
(C) Champions; (R) Relegated

==== 1. divisjon ====
===== Group 1 =====
1. Liungen 18 12 4 2 63–27 40 Play-off 
– - – - – - – - – - – - – - – - – - – - – 
2. Kolbotn 2 18 10 2 6 52–53 32 
3. Røa 18 7 8 3 33–19 29 
4. Skjetten 18 8 5 5 48–37 29 
5. KFUM Oslo 18 7 7 4 42–31 28 
6. Bækkelaget 18 7 3 8 27–45 24 
7. Holeværingen/JIF 18 6 2 10 30–42 20 
8. Vallset 18 5 2 11 35–44 17 
----------------------------------------- 
9. Gjøvik FK 18 4 5 9 24–39 17 Relegated 
10. Rødenes/Askim 18 2 6 10 21–38 12 Relegated

===== Group 2 =====
1. FK Larvik          18  18 0  0  84–15  54  Play-off
– - – - – - – - – - – - – - – - – - – - –
2. Linderud           18  10 2  6  48–30  32
3. Gjelleråsen        18  10 2  6  43–40  32
4. Jardar             18   9 1  8  35–30  28
5. Donn               18   8 1  9  39–36  25
6. Bøler              18   7 2  9  39–49  23  Relegated
7. Snøgg              18   6 4  8  24–25  22
8. Eik-Tønsberg       18   7 1 10  36–49  22
-----------------------------------------
9. Fossum (Skien)     18   5 3 10  25–46  18
10. Langesund          18   1 2 15  13–66   5  Relegated

===== Group 3 =====
1. Solid              14  11 2  1  61–16  35  Play-off
– - – - – - – - – - – - – - – - – - – - –
2. Ulf-Sandnes        14   7 6  1  43–31  27
3. Haugar             14   7 3  4  43–19  24
4. Vard/Avaldsnes     14   7 2  5  34–35  23
5. Bjerkreim          14   5 6  3  34–24  21  Relegated
6. Lyngdal            14   3 3  8  36–51  12
7. Vidar              14   3 1 10  10–53  10
8. -----------------------------------------
9. Havørn             14   1 1 12  25–57   4

===== Group 4 =====
1. Kaupanger 18 14 4 0 98–15 46 Play-off 
– - – - – - – - – - – - – - – - – - – - – 
2. Øygard 18 11 4 3 41–24 37 
3. Sandviken 2 18 9 4 5 44–34 31 
4. Follese 18 8 2 8 42–26 26 
5. Voss 18 7 5 6 30–27 26 
6. Nymark 18 8 2 8 29–42 26 
7. Sandane 18 8 1 9 50–37 25 
8. Førde 18 6 7 5 25–27 25 
----------------------------------------- 
9. Hald 18 3 1 14 24–62 10 
10. Os 18 1 0 17 7–96 3 Relegated

===== Group 5 =====
1. Verdal 14 12 1 1 81–17 37 Play-off 
– - – - – - – - – - – - – - – - – - – - – 
2. Fortuna Ålesund 14 12 0 2 57–13 36 
3. Rindals/Troll 14 7 1 6 44–37 22 
4. Frei 14 6 1 7 34–39 19 
5. Ranheim 14 6 0 8 33–40 18 
6. Molde 14 6 0 8 31–39 18 
7. Os/Nansen/RIL 14 5 0 9 37–67 15 Relegated 
----------------------------------------- 
8. Trondheims/Ørn 2 14 0 1 13 15–80 1

Herd (before season) and Overhalla withdrew

===== Group 6 =====
1. Grand Bodø 16 16 0 0 152- 6 48 Play-off 
– - – - – - – - – - – - – - – - – - – - – 
2. Medkila 16 13 0 3 88–43 39 
3. Innstranden 16 12 1 3 70–21 37 
4. Alta 16 7 1 8 56–44 22 (*) 
5. Salangen 16 7 0 9 41–55 21 
6. Furuflaten 16 6 0 10 21–44 18 
7. Halsøy 16 5 1 10 48–80 16 
8. Bossekop 16 3 1 12 16–54 10 (*) 
----------------------------------------- 
9. Hardhaus 16 1 0 15 5–150 3 Relegated

Kvaløysletta withdrew. (*) Alta and Bossekop merged to form Alta/BUL.

===== Play-off group 1 =====
- October 3: Grand Bodø – Solid 9–0
- October 10: Solid – Liungen 4–5
- October 17: Liungen – Grand Bodø 0–3

1. Grand Bodø 2 2 0 0 12- 0 6 Promoted 
------------------------------------ 
2. Liungen 2 1 0 1 5- 7 3 
3. Solid 2 0 0 2 4–14 0

===== Play-off group 2 =====
- October 4: Verdal – Kaupanger 3–3
- October 10: Kaupanger – Larvik 2–1
- October 17: Larvik – Verdal 5–4

1. Kaupanger 2 1 1 0 5- 4 4 Promoted 
----------------------------------- 
2. Larvik 2 1 0 1 6- 6 3 
3. Verdal 2 0 1 1 7- 8 1

===== Promoted to first division =====
Kvam, Lørenskog, Jerv, Skjetten, Bryne, Eiger, Flekkefjord, Bjørnar 2, Eid, Buvik/Gimse, Herd, Bossmo/Ytteren, Tromsdalen.

== UEFA competitions ==
=== Norwegian representatives ===
- Rosenborg (UEFA Champions League)
- Vålerenga (Cup Winners Cup)
- Brann (UEFA Cup)
- Strømsgodset (UEFA Cup)
- Molde (UEFA Cup)
- Stabæk (Intertoto Cup)
- Kongsvinger (Intertoto Cup)

=== UEFA Champions League ===
==== Qualifying rounds ====
===== Second qualifying round =====
Team 1	Agg.	Team 2	1st leg	2nd leg
Rosenborg (Norway)	4–4 (a)	(Belgium) Club Brugge	2–0	2–4

==== Group stage ====
===== Group B =====
- September 16: Athletic Bilbao (Spain) – Rosenborg 1–1
- September 30: Rosenborg – Juventus (Italy) 1–1
- October 21: Rosenborg – Galatasaray (Turkey) 3–0
- November 4: Galatasaray – Rosenborg 3–0
- November 25: Rosenborg – Athletic Bilbao 2–1
- December 19: Juventus – Rosenborg 2–0

Pos	Team	Pld	W	D	L	GF	GA	GD	Pts	Qualification	JUV	GAL	ROS	ATH
1	(Italy) Juventus	6	1	5	0	7	5	+2	8	Advance to knockout stage	—	2–2	2–0	1–1
2	(Turkey) Galatasaray	6	2	2	2	8	8	0	8		1–1	—	3–0	2–1
3	(Norway) Rosenborg	6	2	2	2	7	8	−1	8		1–1	3–0	—	2–1
4	(Spain) Athletic Bilbao	6	1	3	2	5	6	−1	6		0–0	1–0	1–1	—

Source: UEFA

=== UEFA Cup Winners' Cup ===
==== First round ====
- September 17: Rapid București (Romania) – Vålerenga 2–2
- October 1: Vålerenga – Rapid București 0–0 (agg. 2–2, Vålerenga on away goals)

==== Second round ====
- October 22: Vålerenga – Besiktas (Turkey) 1–0
- November 5: Besiktas – Vålerenga 3–3 (agg. 3–4)

==== Quarter-finals ====
- March 4: Chelsea (Eng) – Vålerenga 3–0
- March 18: Vålerenga – Chelsea 2–3 (agg. 2–6)

=== UEFA Cup ===
==== Second preliminary round ====
1st leg

- August 11: Brann – Zalgiris Vilnius (Lithuania) 1–0
- Hapoel Tel Aviv (Israel) – Strømsgodset 1–0
- Molde – CSKA Sofia (Bulgaria) 0–0

2nd leg

- August 25: CSKA Sofia – Molde 2–0 (agg. 2–0)
- Strømsgodset – Hapoel Tel Aviv 1–0 (extra time) (agg. 1–1, 4–2 on penalties)
- Zalgiris Vilnius – Brann 0–0 (agg. 0–1)

==== First round ====
1st leg

- September 15: Aston Villa (England) – Strømsgodset 3–2
- Brann – Werder Bremen (Germany) 2–0

2nd leg

- September 29: Strømsgodset – Aston Villa 0–3 (agg. 2–6)
- Werder Bremen – Brann 4–0 aet (agg. 4–2)

=== Intertoto Cup ===
==== First round ====
1st leg

- June 20: Ebbw Vale (Wales) – Kongsvinger 1–6
- Stabæk – Vojvodina (Yugoslavia) 1–2

2nd leg

- June 27: Vojvodina – Stabæk 3–2 (agg. 5–3)
- June 28: Kongsvinger – Ebbw Vale 3–0 (agg. 9–1)

==== Second round ====
1st leg

- July 5: Twente (Net) – Kongsvinger 2–0

2nd leg

- July 11: Kongsvinger – Twente 0–0 (agg. 0–2)

== Scandinavian masters ==
=== Group 1 ===
- February 20: Rosenborg – Vejle 4–1
- February 22: Malmö FF – Vejle 0–2
- February 24: Rosenborg – Malmö FF 0–0

1.Rosenborg 2 1 1 0 4- 1 4 
2.Vejle B 2 1 0 1 3- 4 3 
3.Malmö FF 2 0 1 1 0- 2 1

=== Group 2 ===
- February 20: Halmstad – Strømsgodset 1–1
- February 22: København – Strømsgodset 2–1
- February 24: Halmstad – København 0–1

1.FC København 2 2 0 0 3- 1 6 
2.Strømsgodset IF (Drammen) 2 0 1 1 2- 3 1 
3. Halmstad IF 2 0 1 1 1- 2 1

=== Group 3 ===
- February 21: Brann – AIK 1–1
- February 23: Brøndby – Brann 4–2
- February 25: AIK – Brøndby 3–1

1.AIK 2 1 1 0 4- 2 4 
2.Brøndby IF 2 1 0 1 5- 5 3 
3.SK Brann (Bergen) 2 0 1 1 3- 5 1

=== Group 4 ===
- February 21: AGF – Vålerenga 1–2
- February 23: IFK Göteborg – AGF 2–1
- February 25: Vålerenga – IFK Göteborg 2–5

1.IFK Göteborg 2 2 0 0 7- 3 6 
2.Vålerenga IF (Oslo) 2 1 0 1 4- 6 3 
3.AGF (Århus) 2 0 0 2 2- 4 0

=== Consolation matches ===
- February 27: Brøndby – Vålerenga 3–2
- Brann – Vejle 4–1
- AGF – Halmstad 2–0
- Malmö – Strømsgodset 1–0

=== Semi-finals ===
- February 27: Rosenborg – IFK Göteborg 2–0
- AIK – København 0–1

=== Final ===
- February 28: Rosenborg – København 2–0

== National teams ==
=== Norway men's national football team ===
Date	Venue	Opponent	Res.*	Competition	Norwegian goalscorers
February 25	Marseille	France	3–3	Friendly	Frank Strandli, Tore André Flo, Vegard Heggem
March 25	Brussels	Belgium	2–2	Friendly	Vidar Riseth, Ole Gunnar Solskjær
April 22	Copenhagen	Denmark	2–0	Friendly	Øyvind Leonhardsen, Tore André Flo
May 20	Oslo	Mexico	5–2	Friendly	Roar Strand, Håvard Flo, Ronny Johnsen, Henning Berg, Vidar Riseth
May 27	Molde	Saudi Arabia	6–0	Friendly	Kjetil Rekdal, Ole Gunnar Solskjær (2), Egil Østenstad, Tore André Flo, Vidar Riseth
June 10	Montpellier	Morocco	2–2	WC98 Group stage	Youssef Chippo (Own goal), Dan Eggen
June 16	Bordeaux	Scotland	1–1	WC98 Group stage	Håvard Flo
June 23	Marseille	Brazil	2–1	WC98 Group stage	Tore André Flo, Kjetil Rekdal
June 27	Marseille	Italy	0–1	WC98 1/8 final
August 19	Oslo	Romania	0–0	Friendly
September 6	Oslo	Latvia	1–3	ECQ	Ståle Solbakken
October 10	Ljubljana	Slovenia	2–1	ECQ	Tore André Flo, Kjetil Rekdal
October 14	Oslo	Albania	2–2	ECQ	Kjetil Rekdal, Henning Berg
November 18	Cairo	Egypt	1–1	Friendly	Tore André Flo

Note: Norway's goals first
Explanation:

- WC98 = 1998 World Cup
- ECQ = European Championship qualifier

=== Norway women's national football team ===
Date	Venue	Opponent	Res.*	Comp.	Norwegian goalscorers
January 18	Guangzhou	China	2–1	F	Margunn Haugenes, Marianne Pettersen
January 21	Guangzhou	Sweden	2–1	F	Marianne Pettersen, Hege Riise
January 24	Guangzhou	United States	0–3	F
March 15	Olhao	China	0–1	F
March 17	Loulé	Finland	1–0	F	Hege Riise
March 19	Lagoa	United States	4–1	F	Marianne Pettersen (2), Hege Riise, Unni Lehn
March 21	Quarteira	Denmark	4–1	F	Margunn Haugenes, Unni Lehn, Linda Ørmen, Linda Medalen
April 18	Sittard	Netherlands	0–0	WCQ
May 14	Oldham	England	2–1	WCQ	Monica Knudsen, Margunn Haugenes
June 17	Ulefoss	Germany	3–2	WCQ	Ragnhild Gulbrandsen (2), Hege Riise
July 25	Uniondale	China	1–1, 2–4 on penalties	F	Marianne Pettersen
July 27	New York City	Denmark	1–1, 4–2 on penalties	F	Unni Lehn
August 15	Lillestrøm	England	2–0	WCQ	Marianne Pettersen, Brit Sandaune
September 24	Moss	France	6–0	F	Ragnhild Gulbrandsen, Marianne Pettersen (3), Unni Lehn (2)
October 10	Gothenburg	Sweden	2–0	F	Margunn Haugenes, Unni Lehn

- F = Friendly
- WCQ = World Cup Qualification
