= 2000 Norwegian Third Division =

Norwegian football league season

The 2000 season of the 3. divisjon, the fourth highest association football league for men in Norway.

Between 20 and 22 games (depending on group size) were played in 19 groups, with 3 points given for wins and 1 for draws. Unusually few teams were relegated, as the league was expanded to 24 groups in 2001; several extra groups in Eastern Norway and one extra in the Southwest. All group winners had the chance to be promoted to the 2. divisjon through playoff, but as the playoff contained teams from the 2. divisjon as well, those teams usually prevailed. Only four teams—Nybergsund, Nest-Sotra, Stjørdals-Blink and Hammerfest— won promotion.

== Tables ==
Group 1

1. Sparta – lost playoff
2. Aurskog/Finstadbru
3. Sørumsand
4. Råde
5. Kjelsås 2
6. Greåker
7. Skeid 2
8. Holmen
9. Høland
10. Tune – relegated
11. Bækkelaget
12. Navestad

Group 2

1. Rygge – lost playoff
2. Moss 2
3. Fredrikstad 2
4. Grorud
5. Trøgstad/Båstad
6. Vestli
7. Kjellmyra
8. Galterud
9. Grue
10. Frigg
11. Spydeberg
12. Flisa

Group 3

1. Østsiden – lost playoff
2. KFUM
3. Selbak
4. Skjetten 2
5. Fagerborg
6. Bjerke
7. Volla
8. Oslo Øst 2
9. Fjellhamar
10. Lisleby
11. Korsvoll
12. Torp

Group 4

1. Nybergsund – won playoff
2. Toten
3. Ham-Kam 2
4. Vang
5. Fart
6. Lom
7. Ringsaker
8. Trysil
9. Kvam
10. FF Lillehammer 2
11. Sel/Otta
12. Gjøvik-Lyn 2

Group 5

1. Runar – lost playoff
2. Vestfossen
3. Jevnaker
4. Raufoss 2
5. Teie
6. Grindvoll
7. Åmot
8. Falk
9. Borre
10. Sør-Aurdal
11. L/F Hønefoss 2
12. Bygdø

Group 6

1. Mjøndalen – lost playoff
2. Larvik Turn
3. Flint
4. Drafn
5. Birkebeineren
6. Siljan
7. Seljord
8. Notodden
9. Åssiden
10. Slemmestad
11. Tønsberg FK
12. Rjukan

Group 7

1. Jerv – lost playoff
2. Vindbjart
3. Øyestad
4. Lyngdal
5. Langesund/Stathelle
6. Flekkerøy
7. Våg
8. Giv Akt
9. Kvinesdal
10. Sandefjord BKSandefjord 2
11. Herkules
12. Langangen

Group 8

1. Ålgård – lost playoff
2. Klepp
3. Egersund
4. Bryne 2
5. Figgjo
6. Eiger
7. Sola
8. Rosseland
9. Hana
10. Staal
11. Ganddal
12. Tasta

Group 9

1. Nest-Sotra – won playoff
2. Vedavåg
3. Skjold
4. Haugesund 2
5. Nordhordland
6. Torvastad
7. Trott
8. Gneist
9. Trio
10. Nærbø
11. Bremnes
12. Trane

Group 10

1. Brann 2 – lost playoff
2. Radøy
3. Hald
4. Askøy
5. Lyngbø
6. Follese
7. Hovding
8. Austevoll
9. Bergen Nord
10. Vadmyra
11. Bjarg
12. Frøya

Group 11

1. Sogndal 2 – lost playoff
2. Stryn
3. Eid
4. Dale
5. Saga
6. Sandane
7. Høyang
8. Eikefjord
9. Vik – relegated
10. Jølster – relegated
11. Årdalstangen/Lærdal – relegated
12. Svelgen – relegated

Group 12

1. Langevåg – lost playoff
2. Velledalen og Ringen
3. Brattvåg
4. Åram/Vankam
5. Aalesund 2
6. Ha/No
7. Vigra
8. Bergsøy
9. Volda
10. Ellingsøy – relegated
11. Hødd 2 – relegated
12. Sunnylven – relegated

Group 13

1. Kristiansund – lost playoff
2. Gossen
3. Surnadal
4. Åndalsnes
5. Averøykameratene
6. Bryn
7. Midsund
8. Ekko/Aureosen
9. Vestnes Varfjell
10. Bøfjord – relegated
11. Grykameratene – relegated
12. Rival – relegated

Group 14

1. Nidelv – lost playoff
2. Løkken
3. Tynset
4. Nardo
5. Buvik
6. Melhus
7. NTNUI
8. Kvik
9. Røros
10. KIL/Hemne
11. Brekken – relegated
12. Frøya – relegated

Group 15

1. Stjørdals-Blink – won playoff
2. Bangsund
3. Rissa
4. Varden
5. Bogen
6. Namsos
7. Malvik/Hommelvik
8. Rørvik
9. Selbu
10. Freidig – relegated
11. Fram – relegated
12. Vuku – relegated

Group 16

1. Gevir Bodø – lost playoff, then defunct
2. Brønnøysund
3. Sandnessjøen
4. Sørfold – relegated
5. Tverlandet
6. Korgen/Hemnes – relegated
7. Strandkameratene – relegated
8. Nesna
9. Leirfjord
10. Mosjøen 2 – relegated
11. Saltdalkameratene – relegated

Group 17

1. Flakstad – lost playoff
2. Skånland
3. Lofoten 2 – relegated
4. Melbo
5. Beisfjord
6. Medkila
7. Morild
8. Kvæfjord – relegated
9. Harstad 2
10. Leknes – relegated
11. Landsås – relegated
12. Vågakameratene – relegated

Group 18

1. Fløya – lost playoff
2. Ramfjord
3. Tromsø 2
4. Tromsdalen 2
5. Ishavsbyen
6. Nordreisa
7. Pioner – relegated
8. Kvaløysletta
9. Ulfstind – relegated
10. Bardu – relegated
11. Målselv/Mellembygd – relegated
12. Lyngstuva – relegated

Group 19

1. Hammerfest – won playoff
2. Nordlys
3. Kautokeino
4. Honningsvåg
5. Polarstjernen
6. Porsanger
7. Kirkenes
8. Tverrelvdalen
9. Sørøy Glimt
10. Nerskogen
11. Norild – relegated
12. Vardø/Domen – relegated
