= 1997 Norwegian Third Division =

Norwegian football league season

The 1997 season of the 3. divisjon, the fourth highest association football league for men in Norway.

Between 20 and 24 games (depending on group size) were played in 19 groups, with 3 points given for wins and 1 for draws. All group winners were promoted to the 2. divisjon, as well as some of the best runners-up.

== Tables ==
Group 1

1. Bjerke – promoted
2. Rælingen
3. Hafslund
4. Torp
5. Lisleby
6. Ullensaker/Kisa
7. Greåker
8. Drøbak/Frogn 2 – relegated
9. Skjetten 2
10. Sørumsand – relegated
11. Aurskog/Finstadbru – relegated
12. Nittedal – relegated

Group 2

1. Rakkestad – promoted
2. Skeid 2
3. Kvik Halden
4. Trøgstad/Båstad
5. Moss 2
6. Nordby
7. Kolbotn
8. Rygge
9. Tune
10. Vestby – relegated
11. Nesodden – relegated
12. Hærland – relegated

Group 3

1. Vålerenga 2 – promoted
2. Brandval
3. Grue
4. Fart
5. Kongsvinger 2
6. Vang
7. Kjellmyra
8. Manglerud Star
9. Gjelleråsen
10. Grorud – relegated
11. Oppsal – relegated
12. Stange – relegated

Group 4

1. Nybergsund – promoted
2. Vardal
3. Vinstra
4. Trysil
5. Kolbu/KK
6. Lillehammer FK
7. Toten
8. Sel
9. Follebu
10. Nordre Land – relegated
11. Vind – relegated
12. Ringsaker – relegated

Group 5

1. Stabæk 2 – promoted
2. Lyn 2 – promoted
3. Asker
4. Flint
5. Teie
6. Holmen
7. Fram
8. Fagerborg
9. Borre
10. Fevang – relegated
11. KFUM – relegated
12. Tjølling – relegated

Group 6

1. Drafn – promoted
2. Skarphedin
3. Birkebeineren
4. Slemmestad (-> Slemmestad/Bødalen)
5. Storm
6. Snøgg
7. Skotfoss
8. Åmot
9. Rjukan
10. Tønsberg FK – relegated
11. Urædd – relegated
12. Solberg – relegated

Group 7

1. Mandalskameratene – promoted
2. Tollnes
3. Lyngdal
4. Kvinesdal
5. Randesund
6. Grim/Start 2
7. Våg
8. Langesund
9. Sørfjell
10. Donn – relegated
11. Øyestad – relegated
12. Kragerø – relegated

Group 8

1. Klepp – promoted
2. Bryne 2
3. Rosseland
4. Hana
5. Hundvåg
6. Figgjo
7. Varhaug
8. Egersund
9. Nærbø
10. Buøy – relegated
11. Staal – relegated
12. Sokndal – relegated
13. Stavanger – relegated

Group 9

1. Haugesund 2 – promoted
2. Sandnes – promoted
3. Nord
4. Åkra
5. Odda
6. Grannekameratene
7. Bremnes
8. Skjold
9. Kjøkkelvik
10. Djerv 1919 – relegated
11. Solid – relegated
12. Avaldsnes – relegated

Group 10

1. Os – promoted
2. Ny-Krohnborg
3. Kleppestø
4. Vadmyra
5. Follese
6. Radøy
7. Florvåg
8. Bjørnar
9. Nymark
10. Hovding – relegated
11. Bergen Sparta – relegated
12. Kalandseid – relegated
13. Austrheim – relegated

Group 11

1. Jotun – promoted
2. Sogndal 2 – promoted
3. Tornado
4. Sandane
5. Florø
6. Dale
7. Fjøra
8. Eid
9. Eikefjord
10. Høyang
11. Jølster
12. Anga

Group 12

1. Aalesund 2 – promoted
2. Velledalen og Ringen
3. Spjelkavik
4. Hødd 2
5. Langevåg
6. Bergsøy
7. Brattvåg
8. Stranda
9. Hareid
10. Valder
11. Aksla – relegated
12. Herd – relegated

Group 13

1. Clausenengen – promoted
2. Kristiansund – promoted
3. Bryn
4. Ekko/Aureosen
5. Søya
6. Kvass/Ulvungen
7. Sunndal
8. Tomrefjord – relegated
9. Bøfjord
10. Surnadal
11. Isfjorden
12. Bud

Group 14

1. Orkdal – promoted
2. Singsås
3. Tynset
4. NTHI
5. Løkken
6. Røros
7. KIL/Hemne
8. Heimdal
9. Strindheim 2 – relegated
10. Hitra – relegated
11. Leinstrand – relegated
12. Brekken – relegated

Group 15

1. Bangsund – promoted
2. Tiller
3. Melhus
4. Kvamskameratene
5. Fram
6. Levanger
7. Tranabakkan
8. Verdal 2
9. Vinne
10. Vanvik – relegated
11. Steinkjer 2 – relegated
12. Fosen – relegated

Group 16

1. Bodø/Glimt 2 – promoted
2. Saltdalkameratene
3. Brønnøysund
4. Nesna
5. Sørfold
6. Stålkameratene 2 – relegated
7. Korgen
8. Nedre Beiarn – relegated
9. Nordre Meløy
10. Sømna (-> Sømna/Tjalg)
11. Grand Bodø – relegated

Group 17

1. Morild – promoted
2. Landsås
3. Flakstad
4. Vågakameratene
5. Medkila
6. Leknes
7. Skånland
8. Grovfjord
9. Stokmarknes – relegated
10. Beisfjord
11. Andenes – relegated
12. Kvæfjord – relegated

Group 18

1. Lyngen/Karnes – promoted
2. Ulfstind – promoted
3. Nordreisa
4. Skarp
5. Salangen
6. Balsfjord (-> Nordkjosbotn/Balsfjord)
7. Ramfjord
8. Bardu
9. Tromsdalen 2
10. Sørreisa – relegated
11. Pioner – relegated
12. Storfjord – relegated

Group 19

1. Hammerfest – promoted
2. Kirkenes
3. Kautokeino
4. Honningsvåg
5. Sørøy Glimt
6. Nordkinn
7. Bossekop
8. Alta 2 – relegated
9. Golnes – relegated
10. Bjørnevatn
11. Lakselv
12. Nordlys
