= 1999 Norwegian Third Division =

Norwegian football league season

The 1999 season of the 3. divisjon, the fourth highest association football league for men in Norway.

Between 20 and 24 games (depending on group size) were played in 19 groups, with 3 points given for wins and 1 for draws. All group winners were promoted to the 2. divisjon, as well as some of the best runners-up.

== Tables ==
Group 1

1. Strømmen – promoted
2. Spydeberg
3. Fjellhamar
4. Skeid 2
5. Lisleby
6. Grorud
7. Frigg
8. Korsvoll
9. Skjetten 2
10. Røa – relegated
11. Rælingen – relegated
12. Askim – relegated

Group 2

1. Fossum – promoted
2. Rygge
3. Moss 2
4. Kjelsås 2
5. Bjerke
6. Høland
7. Greåker
8. Torp
9. Sørumsand
10. Kolbotn – relegated
11. Eidsvold – relegated
12. Holter – relegated

Group 3

1. Kongsvinger 2 – promoted
2. Rakkestad – promoted
3. Sparta
4. Trysil
5. Fagerborg
6. Selbak
7. Navestad
8. Grue
9. Galterud
10. Oppegård – relegated
11. Bøler – relegated
12. Brandval – relegated

Group 4

1. Vardal – promoted
2. Lom
3. Lillehammer FK (-> FF Lillehammer 2)
4. Vang
5. Sør-Aurdal
6. Kvam
7. Ham-Kam 2
8. Toten
9. Raufoss 2
10. Fart
11. Nordre Land – relegated
12. Vinstra – relegated

Group 5

1. Mercantile – promoted
2. Birkebeineren
3. Vestfossen
4. Mjøndalen
5. Teie
6. Holmen
7. Borre
8. Grindvoll
9. Falk
10. Fram – relegated
11. Svelvik – relegated
12. Strømsgodset 2 – relegated

Group 6

1. Odd Grenland 2 – promoted
2. Eik-Tønsberg 2 – promoted
3. Larvik Turn
4. Rjukan
5. Åmot
6. Snøgg (-> Notodden FK)
7. Åssiden
8. Flint
9. Langangen
10. Halsen – relegated
11. Stag – relegated
12. Tjølling – relegated

Group 7

1. Vigør – promoted
2. Vindbjart
3. Jerv
4. Våg
5. Kvinesdal
6. Øyestad
7. Lyngdal
8. Seljord
9. Langesund (-> Langesund/Stathelle)
10. Søgne – relegated
11. Sørfjell – relegated
12. Stathelle – relegated (-> Langesund/Stathelle)

Group 8

1. Hundvåg – promoted
2. Klepp
3. Bryne 2
4. Eiger
5. Figgjo
6. Staal
7. Rosseland
8. Hana
9. Ganddal
10. Kåsen – relegated
11. Havørn – relegated
12. Lura – relegated

Group 9

1. Nord – promoted
2. Trott
3. Vedavåg
4. Hovding
5. Lyngbø
6. Bremnes
7. Skjold
8. Trio
9. Kopervik – relegated
10. Åkra – relegated
11. Bjørnar – relegated
12. Odda – relegated

Group 10

1. Løv-Ham – promoted
2. Nest-Sotra
3. Kleppestø (-> Askøy FK)
4. Vadmyra
5. Hald
6. Nordhordland
7. Florvåg (-> Askøy FK)
8. Follese
9. Bjarg
10. Loddefjord – relegated
11. Kjøkkelvik – relegated
12. Norheimsund – relegated

Group 11

1. Fjøra – promoted
2. Jotun – promoted
3. Stryn
4. Sandane
5. Dale
6. Svelgen
7. Årdalstangen/Lærdal
8. Jølster
9. Høyang
10. Eikefjord
11. Eid
12. Måløy – relegated

Group 12

1. Spjelkavik – promoted
2. Stranda – promoted
3. Velledalen og Ringen
4. Langevåg
5. Hødd 2
6. Bergsøy
7. Aalesund 2
8. Brattvåg
9. Ellingsøy
10. Åram/Vankam
11. Ha/No
12. Hasundgot – relegated
13. Skodje – relegated

Group 13

1. Dahle – promoted
2. Surnadal
3. Åndalsnes
4. Vestnes Varfjell
5. Kristiansund
6. Bøfjord
7. Ekko/Aureosen
8. Gossen
9. Rival
10. Grykameratene
11. Søya – relegated
12. Bud – relegated

Group 14

1. Tiller – promoted
2. Melhus
3. Nidelv
4. NTNUI
5. Løkken
6. Rissa
7. KIL/Hemne
8. Freidig
9. Frøya
10. Singsås – relegated
11. Orkla 2 – relegated
12. Glimt – relegated

Group 15

1. Levanger – promoted
2. Stjørdals-Blink
3. Bangsund
4. Varden
5. Kvik
6. Malvik
7. Fram
8. Selbu
9. Bogen
10. Vinne – relegated
11. Sandvollan – relegated
12. Heimdal – relegated

Group 16

1. Steigen – promoted
2. Fauske/Sprint – promoted
3. Tverlandet
4. Sandnessjøen
5. Sørfold
6. Saltdalkameratene
7. Bossmo & Ytteren – relegated
8. Korgen
9. Nesna
10. Mosjøen 2
11. Mo 2 – relegated

Group 17

1. Harstad 2
2. Grovfjord – promoted
3. Skånland
4. Morild
5. Vågakameratene
6. Flakstad
7. Leknes
8. Kvæfjord
9. Landsås
10. Medkila
11. Ajaks – relegated
12. Narvik 2 – relegated

Group 18

1. Salangen – promoted
2. Ramfjord
3. Fløya
4. Tromsø 2
5. Tromsdalen 2
6. Ulfstind
7. Bardu
8. Pioner
9. Mellembygd/Målselv
10. Søndre Torsken – relegated
11. Lyngstuva
12. Storsteinnes – relegated

Group 19

1. Bossekop – promoted
2. Kautokeino
3. Nordlys
4. Norild
5. Sørøy Glimt
6. Polarstjernen
7. Lakselv/Porsanger (-> Porsanger)
8. Tverrelvdalen
9. Honningsvåg
10. Nordkinn – relegated
11. Hammerfest 2 – relegated
