= 1996 in Norwegian football =

Football in Norway
- Season: 1996

Men's football
- Tippeligaen: Rosenborg
- 1. divisjon: Lyn (Group 1); Haugesund (Group 2)
- 2. divisjon: Sarpsborg (Group 1); Skjetten (Group 2); Runar (Group 3); Vigør (Group 4); Rosenborg 2 (Group 5); Finnsnes (Group 6)
- Cupen: Tromsø

Women's football
- Toppserien: Trondheims-Ørn
- Cupen: Trondheims-Ørn

The 1996 season was the 91st season of competitive football in Norway.

== Men's football ==
=== League season ===
==== Promotion and relegation ====
League	Promoted to league	Relegated from league
Tippeligaen	Moss; Skeid; Strømsgodset	Hødd; HamKam; Strindheim
1. divisjon	Byåsen; Elverum; Harstad; Mjøndalen; Ullern; Vidar	Alta; Åndalsnes; Mjølner; Sandefjord BK; Sarpsborg; Vard Haugesund

==== Tippeligaen ====
Pos	Team	Pld	W	D	L	GF	GA	GD	Pts	Qualification or relegation
1	Rosenborg (C)	26	18	5	3	82	26	+56	59	Qualification for the Champions League second qualifying round
2	Lillestrøm	26	13	7	6	54	36	+18	46	Qualification for the UEFA Cup second qualifying round
3	Viking	26	12	7	7	50	32	+18	43	Qualification for the UEFA Cup first qualifying round
4	Brann	26	11	9	6	64	50	+14	42	Qualification for the UEFA Cup first qualifying round
5	Tromsø	26	11	8	7	46	41	+5	41	Qualification for the Cup Winners' Cup first round
6	Stabæk	26	9	9	8	47	45	+2	36	Qualification for the Intertoto Cup group stage
7	Kongsvinger	26	9	7	10	38	48	−10	34	Qualification for the Intertoto Cup group stage
8	Molde	26	9	6	11	45	38	+7	33	
9	Skeid	26	10	2	14	33	59	−26	32	
10	Bodø/Glimt	26	9	4	13	44	49	−5	31	
11	Strømsgodset	26	8	5	13	40	59	−19	29	
12	Moss (R)	26	7	8	11	28	47	−19	29	Relegation to First Division
13	Vålerenga (R)	26	6	10	10	30	40	−10	28	Relegation to First Division
14	Start (R)	26	5	3	18	37	71	−34	18	Relegation to First Division

Source: fotball.no
Rules for classification: 1) points; 2) goal difference; 3) number of goals scored.
(C) Champions; (R) Relegated

==== 1. divisjon ====
===== Group 1 =====
Pos	Team	Pld	W	D	L	GF	GA	GD	Pts	Promotion, qualification or relegation
1	Lyn (C, P)	22	15	4	3	53	17	+36	49	Promotion to Tippeligaen
2	Odd Grenland	22	16	1	5	49	23	+26	49	Qualification for the promotion play-offs
3	HamKam	22	13	2	7	45	26	+19	41	
4	Drøbak/Frogn	22	12	5	5	47	29	+18	41	
5	Eik-Tønsberg	22	10	4	8	48	30	+18	34	
6	Harstad (O)	22	9	3	10	29	47	−18	30	Qualification for the relegation play-offs
7	Jevnaker (R)	22	8	5	9	40	46	−6	29	Relegation to Second Division
8	Tromsdalen (R)	22	8	4	10	46	49	−3	28	Relegation to Second Division
9	Ullern (R)	22	5	7	10	29	42	−13	22	Relegation to Second Division
10	Elverum (R)	22	6	2	14	30	53	−23	20	Relegation to Second Division
11	Stålkameratene (R)	22	4	5	13	28	49	−21	17	Relegation to Second Division
12	Mjøndalen (R)	22	4	2	16	24	57	−33	14	Relegation to Second Division

Source: nifs.no
Rules for classification: 1) points; 2) goal difference; 3) number of goals scored.
(C) Champions; (O) Play-off winners; (P) Promoted; (R) Relegated

===== Group 2 =====
Pos	Team	Pld	W	D	L	GF	GA	GD	Pts	Promotion, qualification or relegation
1	Haugesund (C, P)	22	14	5	3	44	21	+23	47	Promotion to Tippeligaen
2	Sogndal (O, P)	22	13	3	6	49	24	+25	42	Qualification for the promotion play-offs
3	Bryne	22	10	5	7	45	41	+4	35	
4	Aalesund	22	9	6	7	32	24	+8	33	
5	Hødd	22	10	2	10	37	38	−1	32	
6	Byåsen (O)	22	9	5	8	34	37	−3	32	Qualification for the relegation play-offs
7	Fana (R)	22	8	7	7	33	31	+2	31	Relegation to Second Division
8	Strindheim (R)	22	9	4	9	36	35	+1	31	Relegation to Second Division
9	Nardo (R)	22	8	4	10	32	36	−4	28	Relegation to Second Division
10	Vidar (R)	22	6	5	11	36	42	−6	23	Relegation to Second Division
11	Åsane (R)	22	5	5	12	33	50	−17	20	Relegation to Second Division
12	Fyllingen (R)	22	3	5	14	28	60	−32	14	Relegation to Second Division

Source: nifs.no
Rules for classification: 1) points; 2) goal difference; 3) number of goals scored.
(C) Champions; (O) Play-off winners; (P) Promoted; (R) Relegated

==== 2. divisjon ====
===== Group 1 =====
Pos	Team	Pld	W	D	L	GF	GA	GD	Pts	Promotion or relegation
1	Sarpsborg (P)	22	15	2	5	51	35	+16	47	Promotion to First Division
2	Bærum	22	12	5	5	52	29	+23	41	
3	Fredrikstad	22	10	6	6	35	23	+12	36	
4	Ski	22	9	8	5	47	25	+22	35	
5	Frigg	22	10	2	10	39	45	−6	32	
6	Ham-Kam 2	22	9	3	10	42	41	+1	30	
7	Faaberg	22	9	3	10	32	43	−11	30	
8	Selbak	22	7	6	9	27	43	−16	27	
9	Raufoss	22	6	7	9	33	35	−2	25	
10	Fossum	22	6	7	9	33	35	−2	25	
11	Nybergsund (R)	22	4	7	11	29	40	−11	19	Relegation to Third Division
12	Rakkestad (R)	22	5	4	13	29	45	−16	19	Relegation to Third Division

(P) Promoted; (R) Relegated

Pos	Team	Pld	W	D	L	GF	GA	GD	Pts	Relegation
1	Finnsnes	22	16	2	4	68	27	+41	50	
2	Gevir Bodø	22	15	3	4	71	23	+48	48	
3	Skjervøy	22	13	5	4	56	24	+32	44	
4	Silsand/Omegn	22	12	4	6	56	32	+24	40	
5	Mjølner-Narvik	22	12	3	7	50	27	+23	39	
6	Alta	22	11	5	6	41	36	+5	38	
7	Sandnessjøen	22	9	2	11	45	53	−8	29	
8	Fauske/Sprint	22	8	4	10	43	51	−8	28	
9	Porsanger	22	7	6	9	33	42	−9	27	
10	Sortland	22	4	3	15	31	71	−40	15	
11	Morild (R)	22	4	2	16	23	59	−36	14	Relegation to Third Division
12	Grovfjord (R)	22	1	1	20	21	93	−72	4	Relegation to Third Division

(R) Relegated

===== Group 2 =====
Pos	Team	Pld	W	D	L	GF	GA	GD	Pts	Relegation
1	Skjetten	22	11	6	5	47	34	+13	39	
2	Ørsta	22	11	5	6	34	26	+8	38	
3	Stryn	22	12	2	8	37	34	+3	38	
4	Løv-Ham	22	9	5	8	34	36	−2	32	
5	Skarbøvik	22	9	5	8	33	36	−3	32	
6	Lillestrøm 2	22	9	4	9	42	38	+4	31	
7	Nest-Sotra	22	9	4	9	31	37	−6	31	
8	Stord	22	8	6	8	36	34	+2	30	
9	Åssiden	22	8	6	8	34	32	+2	30	
10	Liv/Fossekallen	22	8	4	10	36	32	+4	28	
11	Os (R)	22	8	3	11	27	31	−4	27	Relegation to Third Division
12	Brattvåg (R)	22	4	2	16	27	48	−21	14	Relegation to Third Division

(R) Relegated

===== Group 3 =====
Pos	Team	Pld	W	D	L	GF	GA	GD	Pts	Promotion or relegation
1	Runar (P)	22	14	4	4	60	29	+31	46	Promotion to First Division
2	Ørn-Horten	22	12	6	4	38	24	+14	42	
3	Strømmen	22	10	7	5	40	27	+13	37	
4	Abildsø	22	9	6	7	41	41	0	33	
5	Holter	22	10	2	10	56	44	+12	32	
6	Kjelsås	22	9	3	10	34	34	0	30	
7	Sandefjord	22	9	3	10	30	37	−7	30	
8	Pors Grenland	22	8	5	9	40	50	−10	29	
9	Falk	22	6	8	8	44	42	+2	26	
10	Grei	22	8	2	12	30	43	−13	26	
11	Teie (R)	22	5	5	12	27	52	−25	20	Relegation to Third Division
12	Start 2 (R)	22	5	3	14	35	52	−17	18	Relegation to Third Division

(P) Promoted; (R) Relegated

===== Group 4 =====
Pos	Team	Pld	W	D	L	GF	GA	GD	Pts	Relegation
1	Vigør	22	15	3	4	48	24	+24	48	
2	Eiger	22	13	6	3	41	24	+17	45	
3	Vard Haugesund	22	13	4	5	42	26	+16	43	
4	Vedavåg	22	9	6	7	48	36	+12	33	
5	Flekkefjord	22	7	9	6	36	32	+4	30	
6	Randaberg	22	8	4	10	33	41	−8	28	
7	Viking 2	22	7	6	9	45	35	+10	27	
8	Ålgård	22	8	3	11	36	43	−7	27	
9	Kopervik	22	6	8	8	27	41	−14	26	
10	Vindbjart	22	7	4	11	34	36	−2	25	
11	Hana (R)	22	5	6	11	19	37	−18	21	Relegation to Third Division
12	Klepp (R)	22	2	5	15	25	59	−34	11	Relegation to Third Division

(R) Relegated

===== Group 5 =====
Pos	Team	Pld	W	D	L	GF	GA	GD	Pts	Relegation
1	Rosenborg 2	22	13	5	4	53	24	+29	44	
2	Verdal	22	12	2	8	39	21	+18	38	
3	Stjørdals-Blink	22	12	2	8	45	33	+12	38	
4	Steinkjer	22	12	2	8	44	34	+10	38	
5	Orkanger	22	10	3	9	42	51	−9	33	
6	Kolstad	22	9	4	9	41	36	+5	31	
7	Molde 2	22	8	3	11	35	29	+6	27	
8	Nationalkam	22	6	9	7	32	32	0	27	
9	Åndalsnes	22	7	4	11	32	40	−8	25	
10	Namsos	22	7	4	11	32	55	−23	25	
11	Orkdal (R)	22	7	3	12	28	53	−25	24	Relegation to Third Division
12	Melhus (R)	22	6	5	11	27	42	−15	23	Relegation to Third Division

(R) Relegated

=== Norwegian Cup ===
==== Final ====
27 October 1996
13:15 CET (UTC+1)

Tromsø	2–1	Bodø/Glimt
Årst 79'; Rushfeldt 90'	Report	R. Berg 55'

Ullevaal Stadion, Oslo
Attendance: 22,683
Referee: Terje Hauge (Lyngbø)

== Women's football ==
=== League season ===
==== Toppserien ====
Pos	Team	Pld	W	D	L	GF	GA	GD	Pts	Relegation
1	Trondheims-Ørn (C)	18	16	1	1	85	20	+65	49	
2	Sandviken	18	12	2	4	43	19	+24	38	
3	Asker	18	10	1	7	41	27	+14	31	
4	Kolbotn	18	8	4	6	41	40	+1	28	
5	Klepp	18	7	6	5	30	31	−1	27	
6	Sprint/Jeløy	18	6	5	7	26	31	−5	23	
7	Bøler	18	4	5	9	23	42	−19	17	
8	Setskog/Høland	18	5	2	11	35	57	−22	17	
9	Haugar (R)	18	4	4	10	18	36	−18	16	Relegation to First Division
10	Gjelleråsen (R)	18	0	6	12	22	61	−39	6	Relegation to First Division

(C) Champions; (R) Relegated

=== Norwegian Women's Cup ===
==== Final ====
- Trondheims-Ørn 3–0 Klepp

== UEFA competitions ==
=== UEFA Champions League ===
==== Qualifying round ====
Team 1	Agg.	Team 2	1st leg	2nd leg
Panathinaikos (Greece)	1–3	(Norway) Rosenborg	1–0	0–3 (aet)

==== Group stage ====
===== Group D =====
Team	Pld	W	D	L	GF	GA	GD	Pts	POR	ROS	MIL	GÖT
(Portugal) Porto	6	5	1	0	12	4	+8	16		3–0	1–1	2–1
(Norway) Rosenborg	6	3	0	3	7	11	−4	9	0–1		1–4	1–0
(Italy) Milan	6	2	1	3	13	11	+2	7	2–3	1–2		4–2
(Sweden) IFK Göteborg	6	1	0	5	7	13	−6	3	0–2	2–3	2–1	

=== UEFA Cup Winners' Cup ===
==== Qualifying round ====
Team 1	Agg.	Team 2	1st leg	2nd leg
Shelbourne (Republic of Ireland)	2–5	(Norway) Brann	1–3	1–2

==== First round ====
Team 1	Agg.	Team 2	1st leg	2nd leg
Cercle Brugge (Belgium)	3–6	(Norway) Brann	3–2	0–4

==== Second round ====
Team 1	Agg.	Team 2	1st leg	2nd leg
Brann (Norway)	4–3	(Netherlands) PSV	2–1	2–2

==== Quarter-finals ====
Team 1	Agg.	Team 2	1st leg	2nd leg
Brann (Norway)	1–4	(England) Liverpool	1–1	0–3

=== UEFA Cup ===
==== Qualifying round ====
Team 1	Agg.	Team 2	1st leg	2nd leg
Beitar Jerusalem (Israel)	2–7	(Norway) Bodø/Glimt	1–5	1–2
Dinamo Tbilisi (Georgia (country))	2–1	(Norway) Molde	2–1	0–0

==== First round ====
Team 1	Agg.	Team 2	1st leg	2nd leg
Bodø/Glimt (Norway)	2–5	(Turkey) Trabzonspor	1–2	1–3

=== Intertoto Cup ===
==== Group stage ====
===== Group 5 =====
Pos	Team	Pld	W	D	L	GF	GA	GD	Pts
1	(France) Nantes	4	3	1	0	12	7	+5	10
2	(Norway) Lillestrøm	4	3	0	1	11	4	+7	9
3	(Netherlands) Heerenveen	4	1	1	2	4	5	−1	4
4	(Lithuania) Kaunas	4	1	0	3	4	10	−6	3
5	(Republic of Ireland) Sligo Rovers	4	0	2	2	3	8	−5	2

== National teams ==
=== Norway men's national football team ===
==== Results ====
7 February 1996 Friendly	Spain	1–0	Norway	Las Palmas, Spain
CET (UTC+1)	Kiko 44'	Report		Stadium: Estadio Insular; Attendance: 18,500; Referee: Marcello Nicchi (Italy)
