= 2001 in Norwegian football =

Football in Norway
- Season: 2001

Men's football
- Tippeligaen: Rosenborg
- 1. divisjon: Vålerenga
- 2. divisjon: Tollnes (Group 1); Åsane (Group 2); Oslo Øst (Group 3); Lørenskog (Group 4)
- Cupen: Viking

Women's football
- Toppserien: Trondheims-Ørn
- 1. divisjon: Sandviken
- Cupen: Trondheims-Ørn

Results from Norwegian football in 2001.

== Men's football ==
=== League season ===
==== Tippeligaen ====
Pos	Team	Pld	W	D	L	GF	GA	GD	Pts	Qualification or relegation
1	Rosenborg (C)	26	17	6	3	71	30	+41	57	Qualification for the Champions League third qualifying round
2	Lillestrøm	26	17	5	4	64	33	+31	56	Qualification for the Champions League second qualifying round
3	Viking	26	14	7	5	43	29	+14	49	Qualification for the UEFA Cup first round (Note: Since Viking qualified to the UEFA Cup first round as Norwegian Cup winners, their place in the UEFA Cup as third-placed team passed down and was awarded to Stabæk as the highest-placed team not already qualified for European competitions.)
4	Stabæk	26	14	3	9	45	39	+6	45	Qualification for the UEFA Cup qualifying round
5	Molde	26	13	5	8	54	41	+13	44	
6	Odd Grenland	26	12	6	8	50	40	+10	42	
7	Brann	26	12	5	9	63	48	+15	41	Qualification for the UEFA Cup qualifying round (Note: Brann qualified to the UEFA Cup through the UEFA Fair Play ranking award.)
8	Sogndal	26	9	5	12	45	61	−16	32	
9	Bodø/Glimt	26	7	8	11	45	47	−2	29	
10	Moss	26	9	2	15	35	48	−13	29	
11	Lyn	26	6	8	12	40	49	−9	26	
12	Bryne (O)	26	6	4	16	33	61	−28	22	Qualification for the relegation play-offs
13	Strømsgodset (R)	26	3	10	13	40	73	−33	19	Relegation to First Division
14	Tromsø (R)	26	4	4	18	23	52	−29	16	Relegation to First Division

Source: fotball.no
Rules for classification: 1) points; 2) goal difference; 3) number of goals scored.
(C) Champions; (O) Play-off winners; (R) Relegated

===== Play-off =====
November 7: Bryne – Hamarkameratene 3–0

Bryne stadion
Att: 4030
1–0 (25) Marcus Andreasson 
2–0 (84) Trond Bjørnsen 
3–0 (86) Trond Bjørnsen 
Yellow card: Stian Thomassen, Hamarkameratene.

November 10: Hamarkameratene – Bryne 0–0 (agg. 0–3)

Briskeby Gressbane
Att: 2552
Yellow card: Marcus Andreasson, Geir Atle Undheim, Anders Friberg,
Bryne.

Bryne stayed up.

==== First division ====
Pos	Team	Pld	W	D	L	GF	GA	GD	Pts	Promotion or relegation
1	Vålerenga (Note: Vålerenga was deducted 3 points due to use of ineligible players.) (C, P)	30	19	8	3	71	29	+42	62	Promotion to Tippeligaen
2	Start (P)	30	18	8	4	59	33	+26	62	Promotion to Tippeligaen
3	HamKam	30	18	6	6	59	38	+21	60	Qualification for the promotion play-offs
4	Haugesund	30	17	5	8	76	44	+32	56	
5	Raufoss	30	15	5	10	61	43	+18	50	
6	Aalesund	30	13	8	9	65	51	+14	47	
7	Sandefjord	30	13	5	12	59	54	+5	44	
8	Skeid	30	12	5	13	50	41	+9	41	
9	L/F Hønefoss (Note: L/F Hønefoss changed its name to Hønefoss BK after the 2001 season.)	30	10	10	10	45	54	−9	40	
10	Tromsdalen	30	10	9	11	40	56	−16	39	
11	Hødd	30	9	8	13	50	51	−1	35	
12	Ørn-Horten	30	10	4	16	41	72	−31	34	
13	Mandalskameratene (R)	30	9	5	16	49	62	−13	32	Relegation to Second Division
14	Kongsvinger (R)	30	8	5	17	33	57	−24	29	Relegation to Second Division
15	Kjelsås (R)	30	6	6	18	26	50	−24	24	Relegation to Second Division
16	Byåsen (R)	30	3	3	24	29	78	−49	12	Relegation to Second Division

Source: nifs.no
Rules for classification: 1) points; 2) goal difference; 3) number of goals scored.
(C) Champions; (P) Promoted; (R) Relegated

==== Second division ====
===== Group 1 =====
Pos	Team	Pld	W	D	L	GF	GA	GD	Pts	Promotion or relegation
1	Tollnes (P)	26	14	8	4	73	47	+26	50	Promotion to First Division
2	FF Lillehammer	26	15	5	6	44	31	+13	50	
3	Eik-Tønsberg	26	15	4	7	63	44	+19	49	
4	Fredrikstad	26	15	2	9	52	42	+10	47	
5	Bærum	26	12	5	9	60	44	+16	41	
6	Nybergsund	26	12	3	11	43	37	+6	39	
7	Ullensaker/Kisa	26	10	6	10	58	58	0	36	
8	Pors Grenland	26	11	3	12	46	52	−6	36	
9	Kvik Halden	26	11	1	14	41	38	+3	34	
10	Sprint-Jeløy	26	10	4	12	42	54	−12	34	
11	Stabæk 2	26	10	3	13	46	43	+3	33	
12	Asker (R)	26	8	5	13	42	56	−14	29	Relegation to Third Division
13	Ullern (R)	26	5	5	16	36	68	−32	20	Relegation to Third Division
14	Odd Grenland 2 (R)	26	5	4	17	47	79	−32	19	Relegation to Third Division

(P) Promoted; (R) Relegated

===== Group 2 =====
Pos	Team	Pld	W	D	L	GF	GA	GD	Pts	Promotion or relegation
1	Åsane (P)	26	19	4	3	57	17	+40	61	Promotion to First Division
2	Fana	26	17	4	5	66	36	+30	55	
3	Vard Haugesund	26	16	4	6	71	40	+31	52	
4	Fyllingen	26	14	6	6	63	48	+15	48	
5	Løv-Ham	26	14	1	11	59	36	+23	43	
6	Nord	26	13	2	11	54	50	+4	41	
7	Viking 2	26	11	4	11	71	65	+6	37	
8	Vidar	26	11	3	12	60	62	−2	36	
9	Førde	26	9	6	11	60	70	−10	33	
10	Tornado	26	9	5	12	56	63	−7	32	
11	Nest-Sotra	26	9	4	13	49	51	−2	31	
12	Sandnes (R)	26	9	4	13	47	56	−9	31	Relegation to Third Division
13	Florø (R)	26	4	5	17	32	69	−37	17	Relegation to Third Division
14	Stord (R)	26	1	0	25	31	113	−82	3	Relegation to Third Division

Source: RSSSF
(P) Promoted; (R) Relegated

===== Group 3 =====
Pos	Team	Pld	W	D	L	GF	GA	GD	Pts	Promotion or relegation
1	Oslo Øst (P)	26	18	4	4	74	36	+38	58	Promotion to First Division
2	Strindheim	26	15	5	6	70	45	+25	50	
3	Rosenborg 2	26	15	4	7	58	37	+21	49	
4	Romerike Fotball	26	14	5	7	66	34	+32	47	
5	Træff	26	11	5	10	55	50	+5	38	
6	Skarbøvik	26	10	6	10	47	58	−11	36	
7	Steinkjer	26	10	5	11	44	48	−4	35	
8	Clausenengen	26	10	5	11	55	63	−8	35	
9	Molde 2	26	9	6	11	60	50	+10	33	
10	Spjelkavik	26	8	6	12	49	66	−17	30	
11	Verdal	26	8	5	13	42	51	−9	29	
12	Gjøvik-Lyn (R)	26	7	6	13	34	48	−14	27	Relegation to Third Division
13	Stjørdals-Blink (R)	26	9	0	17	37	74	−37	27	Relegation to Third Division
14	Ranheim (R)	26	6	2	18	37	68	−31	20	Relegation to Third Division

Source: RSSSF
(P) Promoted; (R) Relegated

===== Group 4 =====
Pos	Team	Pld	W	D	L	GF	GA	GD	Pts	Promotion or relegation
1	Lørenskog (P)	26	18	5	3	69	23	+46	59	Promotion to First Division
2	Skarp	26	17	2	7	85	45	+40	53	
3	Lofoten	26	15	6	5	65	43	+22	51	
4	Lyn 2	26	13	4	9	57	41	+16	43	
5	Alta	26	13	1	12	60	57	+3	40	
6	Stålkameratene	26	11	5	10	60	67	−7	38	
7	Harstad	26	10	5	11	58	49	+9	35	
8	Skjervøy	26	8	10	8	50	50	0	34	
9	Eidsvold Turn	26	10	3	13	52	53	−1	33	
10	Mo	26	9	6	11	55	61	−6	33	
11	Hammerfest	26	8	4	14	44	58	−14	28	
12	Fauske/Sprint (R)	26	8	2	16	46	79	−33	26	Relegation to Third Division
13	Narvik (R)	26	6	6	14	43	58	−15	24	Relegation to Third Division
14	Finnsnes (R)	26	5	3	18	32	92	−60	18	Relegation to Third Division

Source: RSSSF
(P) Promoted; (R) Relegated

==== Third Division ====
===== Group 1 =====
1. Lillestrøm 2 20 17 2 1 99–17 53 Play-off
– - – - – - – - – - – - – - – - – - – -
2. Grorud 20 14 2 4 52–28 44
3. Vålerenga 2 20 12 2 6 59–40 38
4. Lisleby 20 10 3 7 37–38 33
5. Råde 20 9 2 9 42–37 29
6. Rygge 20 7 4 9 40–44 25
7. Rælingen 20 7 2 11 34–53 23
8. Rolvsøy 20 6 3 11 28–57 21
9. Volla 20 5 3 12 34–50 18 (1
---------------------------------------
10.Vestli 20 5 2 13 28–59 17 Relegated
11.Oppsal 20 4 3 13 28–58 15 Relegated
Tune withdrew

(1: Volla changed their name to Focus

===== Group 2 =====
1. Follo 22 18 1 3 79–22 55 Play-off
– - – - – - – - – - – - – - – - – - – -
2. Østsiden 22 16 2 4 60–22 50
3. Årvoll 22 15 3 4 77–40 48
4. KFUM Oslo 22 13 6 3 48–19 45
5. Navestad 22 12 2 8 47–33 38 (1
6. Fredrikstad 2 22 8 3 11 44–51 27
7. Oslo Øst 2 22 7 4 11 37–48 25
8. Borgen 22 6 6 10 46–52 24
9. Torp 22 7 3 12 41–60 24
---------------------------------------
10.Bjerke 22 5 3 14 36–61 18 Relegated
11.Leirsund 22 5 3 14 38–79 18 Relegated
12.Lommedalen 22 1 2 19 35–101 5 Relegated

(1: Navestad changed their name to Borg Fotball (superstructure).

===== Group 3 =====
1. Kongsvinger 2 22 13 3 6 63–28 42
– - – - – - – - – - – - – - – - – - – -
2. Nittedal 22 13 3 6 67–42 42 Play-off
3. Brumunddal 22 12 6 4 53–29 42 
4. Romerike 2 22 12 4 6 60–43 40
5. Grue 22 12 3 7 62–39 39 
6. Ringsaker 22 8 8 6 38–33 32
7. Høland 22 9 3 10 56–57 30
8. Aurskog/Finstadbru 22 7 7 8 44–37 28
9. Sørumsand 22 8 3 11 44–57 27
---------------------------------------
10.Eidskog 22 7 4 11 36–56 25 Relegated
11.Kjellmyra 22 4 2 16 21–59 14 Relegated
12.Flisa 22 3 2 17 27–91 11 Relegated

===== Group 4 =====
1. Moss 2 22 17 5 0 72–28 56 Play-off
– - – - – - – - – - – - – - – - – - – -
2. Sparta 22 11 4 7 49–28 37
3. Strømmen 22 10 5 7 46–37 35 
4. Nordstrand 22 11 2 9 45–37 35
5. Haugerud 22 10 5 7 47–42 35 (1
6. Skeid 2 22 9 4 9 53–50 31
7. Selbak 22 8 5 9 43–43 29
8. Drøbak/Frogn 22 8 5 9 37–42 29
9. Fjellhamar 22 7 5 10 42–44 26
---------------------------------------
10.Bækkelaget 22 4 10 8 31–44 22 Relegated
12. Tistedalen 22 3 8 11 26–52 17 Relegated
13.Korsvoll 22 2 6 14 23–67 12 Relegated

(1: Haugerud merged with Tveita and Trosterud to form Hellerud.

===== Group 5 =====
1. Frigg Oslo 22 14 5 3 57–29 47 Play-off
– - – - – - – - – - – - – - – - – - – -
2. Trøgstad/Båstad 22 14 3 5 56–24 45
3. Kjelsås 2 22 12 6 4 47–20 42
4. Sarpsborg 22 12 4 6 66–43 40
5. Rakkestad 22 11 3 8 45–37 36
6. Fagerborg 22 11 2 9 53–33 35
7. Greåker 22 8 8 6 32–31 32
8. Spydeberg 22 7 5 10 39–53 26
9. Sander 22 7 5 10 32–52 26
---------------------------------------
10.Galterud 22 4 7 11 41–50 19 Relegated
11.Bygdø 22 5 3 14 30–68 18 Relegated
12.Nesodden 22 0 3 19 26–84 3 Relegated

===== Group 6 =====
1. Elverum 22 17 1 4 95–25 52 Play-off
– - – - – - – - – - – - – - – - – - – -
2. Raufoss 2 22 17 1 4 89–29 52
3. Vardal 22 11 5 6 63–43 38
4. Ringebu/Fåvang 22 10 3 9 53–59 33
5. Hamarkameratene 2 22 8 6 8 54–39 30
6. Trysil 22 9 3 10 45–48 30
7. Toten 22 8 5 9 48–55 29
8. Kolbu/KK 22 8 5 9 48–56 29
9. FF Lillehammer 2 22 7 3 12 43–69 24
---------------------------------------
10.Kvam 22 7 2 13 38–70 23 Relegated
11.Lom 22 7 2 13 38–72 23 Relegated
12.Sel/Otta 22 3 4 15 26–75 13 Relegated

===== Group 7 =====
1. Grindvoll 22 17 3 2 65–26 54 Play-off
– - – - – - – - – - – - – - – - – - – -
2. Mercantile/Lamb. 22 16 3 3 54–15 51 (1
3. Grei 22 14 5 3 61–23 47
4. L/F Hønefoss 2 22 13 3 6 58–39 42
5. Jevnaker 22 10 1 11 50–43 31
6. Holmen 22 7 5 10 32–48 26 
7. Vang 22 7 3 12 35–52 24
8. Sør-Aurdal 22 6 5 11 32–51 23 (2
9. Lunner 22 6 4 12 42–60 22
---------------------------------------
10.Fart 22 6 4 12 35–58 22 Relegated
11.Gjøvik/Lyn 2 22 5 3 14 35–58 18 Relegated
12.Rommen 22 4 3 15 29–55 15 Relegated

(1 Mercantile/Lambertseter changed their name (back) to Mercantile. (2 Sør-Aurdal merged with Fagernes to form SAFK Fagernes.

===== Group 8 =====
1. Strømsgodset 2 22 18 1 3 72–17 55
– - – - – - – - – - – - – - – - – - – -
2. Birkebeineren 22 16 2 4 80–24 50 Play-off
3. Fossum (Bærum) 22 15 3 4 63–24 48
4. Runar 22 15 3 4 63–27 48
5. Teie 22 15 1 6 44–38 46
6. Stokke 22 8 3 11 46–50 27
7. Åssiden 22 8 3 11 45–52 27
8. Falk 22 8 1 13 39–64 25
9. Slemmestad 22 5 1 16 26–64 16
---------------------------------------
10. Halsen-Larvik 22 4 3 15 23–72 15 Relegated
11.Drafn 22 3 4 15 47–67 13 Relegated
12.Sandefjord BK 22 2 5 15 32–81 11 Relegated

===== Group 9 =====
1. Larvik Fotball 22 18 2 2 95–19 56 Play-off
– - – - – - – - – - – - – - – - – - – -
2. Flint 22 16 3 3 92–31 51
3. Larvik Turn 22 16 3 3 67–25 51
4. Mjøndalen 22 14 1 7 60–34 43
5. Åmot 22 13 3 6 50–37 42
6. Vestfossen 22 11 2 9 60–50 35
7. Eik-Tønsberg 2 22 11 1 10 40–53 34
8. Kongsberg 22 10 2 10 40–32 32
9. Tønsberg FK 22 7 0 15 28–62 21
---------------------------------------
10.Borre 22 4 1 17 32–79 13 Relegated
11.Konnerud 22 1 2 19 23–77 5 Relegated
12.Rjukan 22 0 2 20 25–113 2 Relegated

===== Group 10 =====
1. Jerv 22 15 2 5 60–23 47 Play-off 
– - – - – - – - – - – - – - – - – - – - 
2. Langesund/Stath. 22 14 2 6 49–34 44
3. Urædd 22 10 6 6 48–36 36
4. FK Arendal 22 10 6 6 46–38 36
5. Notodden 22 10 2 10 50–43 32
6. Skotfoss 22 9 4 9 50–41 31
7. Skarphedin 22 9 4 9 39–30 31 
8. Herkules 22 8 3 11 35–53 27
9. Siljan 22 7 5 10 39–49 26
---------------------------------------
10.Brevik 22 6 5 11 37–51 23 Relegated
11.Seljord 22 6 5 11 37–54 23 Relegated
12.Langangen 22 4 4 14 25–63 16 Relegated

===== Group 11 =====
1. Vindbjart 22 17 1 4 70–29 52 Play-off
– - – - – - – - – - – - – - – - – - – -
2. Lyngdal 22 16 3 3 53–20 51
3. Start 2 22 15 2 5 75–28 47
4. Flekkerøy 22 14 1 7 47–33 43
5. Våg 22 12 3 7 59–33 39
6. Flekkefjord 22 11 4 7 46–51 37
7. Vigør 22 9 4 9 48–43 31
8. Søgne 22 8 3 11 46–50 27
9. Rygene 22 5 3 14 27–49 18
---------------------------------------
10.Kvinesdal 22 3 5 14 21–65 14 Relegated
11. Giv Akt 22 3 2 17 23–66 11 Relegated
12.Randesund 22 3 1 18 29–77 10 Relegated

===== Group 12 =====
1. Klepp 22 16 1 5 78–33 49 Play-off
– - – - – - – - – - – - – - – - – - – -
2. Bryne 2 22 16 1 5 63–24 49
3. Eiger 22 13 2 7 53–44 41
4. Randaberg 22 12 3 7 47–40 39
5. Vardeneset 22 11 2 9 68–48 35
6. Vaulen 22 9 3 10 61–61 30
7. Tasta 22 9 3 10 55–55 30
8. Ulf-Sandnes 22 8 4 10 43–47 28
9. Egersund 22 8 4 10 35–41 28
---------------------------------------
10.Staal 22 8 3 11 54–58 27 Relegated
11.Rosseland 22 7 1 14 44–57 22 Relegated
12.Nærbø 22 0 3 19 12–105 3 Relegated

===== Group 13 =====
1. Vedavåg Karmøy 22 15 4 3 57–27 49 Play-off
– - – - – - – - – - – - – - – - – - – -
2. Ålgård 22 13 4 5 53–35 43
3. Åkra 22 13 2 7 64–42 41
4. Hundvåg 22 10 5 7 44–35 35
5. Hana 22 11 2 9 48–43 35
6. Torvastad 22 10 1 11 42–46 31
7. Haugesund 2 22 8 5 9 50–44 29
8. Figgjo 22 8 3 11 46–48 27
9. Sola 22 7 4 11 34–54 25
---------------------------------------
10.Kopervik 22 6 6 10 30–38 24 Relegated
11.Skjold 22 6 4 12 31–51 22 Relegated
12.Ganddal 22 3 4 15 23–59 13 Relegated

===== Group 14 =====
1. Radøy 22 17 5 0 87–29 56 Play-off (1
– - – - – - – - – - – - – - – - – - – -
2. Hald 22 12 6 4 46–25 42
3. Ny-Krohnborg 22 12 4 6 65–42 40
4. Gneist 22 11 3 8 56–40 36
5. Austevoll 22 9 5 8 59–51 32
6. Lyngbø 22 10 2 10 38–40 32
7. Arna-Bjørnar 22 8 3 11 37–50 27
8. Osterøy 22 8 2 12 26–61 26
9. Trane 22 7 4 11 49–58 25
---------------------------------------
10.Bergen Nord 22 7 2 13 39–59 23 Relegated
11.Nordhordland 22 4 5 13 29–49 17 Relegated
12.Frøya 22 4 5 13 26–53 17 Relegated

(1 Radøy merged with Manger to form Radøy/Manger.

===== Group 15 =====
1. Brann 2 22 15 5 2 84–23 50 Play-off
– - – - – - – - – - – - – - – - – - – -
2. Askøy 22 15 2 5 81–42 47
3. Hovding 22 13 6 3 54–27 45
4. Vadmyra 22 11 3 8 47–44 36
5. Os 22 11 2 9 45–42 35
6. Trott 22 9 5 8 43–30 32
7. Follese 22 8 5 9 37–44 29
8. Bremnes 22 8 4 10 44–48 28
9. Varegg 22 6 7 9 43–44 25
---------------------------------------
10.Trio 22 7 4 11 41–44 25 Relegated
11.Kjøkkelvik 22 5 1 16 23–74 16 Relegated
12.Bjarg 22 1 2 19 24–104 5 Relegated

===== Group 16 =====
1. Stryn 22 16 2 4 82–33 50 Play-off
– - – - – - – - – - – - – - – - – - – -
2. Jotun 22 15 3 4 86–21 48
3. Fjøra 22 14 5 3 76–31 47
4. Sogndal 2 22 14 3 5 82–40 45
5. Sandane 22 10 1 11 75–55 31
6. Høyang 22 9 4 9 61–67 31
7. Saga 22 9 3 10 32–53 30
8. Dale (Sunnfjord) 22 8 4 10 38–47 28
9. Eid 22 7 6 9 37–43 27
---------------------------------------
10.Kaupanger 22 7 1 14 28–78 22 Relegated
11.Askvoll/Holmedal 22 3 2 17 28–93 11 Relegated
12.Eikefjord 22 3 0 19 30–94 9 Relegated

===== Group 17 =====
1. Langevåg 24 18 3 3 83–33 57 Play-off
– - – - – - – - – - – - – - – - – - – -
2. Ørsta 24 17 4 3 80–33 55
3. Aalesund 2 24 12 4 8 71–43 40
4. Stranda 24 12 4 8 61–49 40
5. Velledalen/Ringen 24 9 10 5 51–39 37
6. Bergsøy 24 11 4 9 53–62 37
7. Vigra 24 9 5 10 43–44 32
8. Hareid 24 9 4 11 44–48 31
9. Volda 24 8 7 9 48–58 31
---------------------------------------
10.Brattvåg 24 8 3 13 38–56 27 Relegated
11.Haramsøy/Nordøy 24 8 1 15 44–73 25 Relegated
12.Hovdebygda 24 3 5 16 32–68 14 Relegated
13.Åram/Vanylvskam. 24 2 6 16 34–76 12 Relegated

===== Group 18 =====
1. Dahle 22 15 2 5 70–38 47 Play-off
– - – - – - – - – - – - – - – - – - – -
2. Kristiansund 22 14 3 5 74–40 45
3. Åndalsnes 22 12 3 7 69–44 39
4. Midsund 22 10 6 6 57–45 36
5. Sunndal 22 11 3 8 46–40 36
6. Gossen 22 11 1 10 51–46 34
7. Surnadal 22 11 1 10 49–48 34
8. Averøykameratene 22 10 1 11 49–48 31
9. Ekko/Aureosen 22 9 3 10 42–56 30
---------------------------------------
10.Bryn 22 6 1 15 26–64 19 Relegated
11.Kvass/Ulvungen 22 5 2 15 36–57 17 Relegated
12.Vestnes Varfjell 22 4 2 16 33–76 14 Relegated

===== Group 19 =====
1. Nidelv 22 16 5 1 67–23 53 Play-off
– - – - – - – - – - – - – - – - – - – -
2. Kolstad 22 14 2 6 65–41 44
3. Løkken 22 13 4 5 69–36 43 (1
4. Orkla 22 13 4 5 42–27 43
5. Tynset 22 11 7 4 70–41 40
6. Buvik 22 10 2 10 60–59 32
7. Nardo 22 9 3 10 36–43 30
8. Malvik FK 22 7 5 10 40–46 26
9. Melhus 22 5 5 12 34–45 20
---------------------------------------
10.NTNUI 22 6 2 14 37–68 20 Relegated
11.KIL/Hemne 22 3 5 14 36–67 14 Relegated
12.Røros 22 2 2 18 27–87 8 Relegated

(1 Løkken merged with Dalguten to form Løkken/Dalguten.

===== Group 20 =====
1. Levanger 22 15 3 4 67–23 48 Play-off
– - – - – - – - – - – - – - – - – - – -
2. Tiller 22 14 3 5 73–40 45
3. Bangsund 22 12 6 4 45–28 42 
4. Rørvik 22 12 4 6 56–38 40
5. Rissa 22 11 6 5 62–31 39
6. Varden (Meråker) 22 10 4 8 64–51 34 (1
7. Selbu 22 9 3 10 38–47 30
8. Vinne/Verdal 2 22 7 2 13 34–57 23
9. Namsos 22 6 3 13 51–68 21
---------------------------------------
10.Kvik (Trondheim) 22 5 4 13 47–55 19 Relegated
11.Bogen 22 5 4 13 28–69 19 Relegated
12.Fosen 22 3 4 15 25–83 13 Relegated

(1: Varden withdrew before the 2002 season.

===== Group 21 =====
1. Innstranden 18 13 4 1 88–22 43 Play-off
– - – - – - – - – - – - – - – - – - – -
2. Bodø/Glimt 2 18 11 4 3 69–30 37
3. Steigen 18 11 4 3 60–24 37
4. Mosjøen 18 10 3 5 38–38 33
5. Tverlandet 18 9 3 6 48–35 30
6. Brønnøysund 18 7 5 6 31–40 26
7. Sandnessjøen 18 6 4 8 17–32 22
8. Nesna 18 3 1 14 34–70 10
9. Leirfjord 18 2 2 14 17–51 8 
---------------------------------------
10.Mo 2 18 2 2 14 21–81 8 Relegated
Gevir Bodø withdrew.

===== Group 22 =====
1. Vesterålen 20 19 0 1 99–25 57 Play-off
– - – - – - – - – - – - – - – - – - – -
2. Skånland/Omegn 20 13 5 2 54–29 44
3. Grovfjord 20 12 1 7 43–30 37
4. Flakstad 20 10 3 7 49–33 33
5. Medkila 20 9 2 9 57–51 29
6. Morild 20 7 7 6 32–42 28
7. Ballangen 20 8 1 11 38–58 25
8. Beisfjord 20 6 3 11 38–58 21
9. Høken 20 3 7 10 43–55 16
---------------------------------------
10.Melbo 20 5 1 14 44–75 16 Relegated
11. Harstad 2 20 2 2 16 33–74 8 Relegated
Lofoten 2 withdrew.

===== Group 23 =====
1. Salangen 22 17 1 4 84–44 52 Play-off
– - – - – - – - – - – - – - – - – - – -
2. Tromsø 2 22 13 3 6 87–48 42
3. Lyngen/Karnes 22 13 3 6 80–41 42
4. Senja 22 12 4 6 86–54 40
5. Fløya 22 11 3 8 60–55 36
6. Ramfjord 22 10 3 9 61–48 33
7. Ringvassøy 22 10 1 11 58–51 31
8. Tromsdalen 2 22 9 2 11 67–69 29
9. Kvaløysletta 22 7 3 12 46–66 24
---------------------------------------
10.Nordreisa 22 7 2 13 28–62 23 Relegated
11.Ishavsbyen 22 6 4 12 41–63 22 Relegated
12.Finnsnes 2 22 2 1 19 31–128 7 (ex Pioner) Relegated

===== Group 24 =====
1. Porsanger 20 16 3 1 73–19 51 Play-off
– - – - – - – - – - – - – - – - – - – -
2. Kautokeino 20 16 2 2 77–28 50
3. Bossekop 20 13 2 5 67–24 41
4. Nordlys 20 10 2 8 65–39 32
5. Polarstjernen 20 8 4 8 37–53 28
6. Tverrelvdalen 20 8 1 11 36–68 25
7. Kirkenes 20 6 4 10 39–43 22
8. Honningsvåg 20 6 2 12 25–60 20
9. Nerskogen 20 5 3 12 34–59 18
---------------------------------------
10.Nordkinn 20 5 2 13 26–53 17 Relegated
11.Sørøy/Glimt 20 3 3 14 32–65 12 Relegated

=== First round ===
September 29: Lillestrøm 2 – Follo 1–0
Larvik Fotball – Vindbjart 3–1
Salangen – Porsanger 2–1
September 30: Grindvoll – Nittedal 2–0
Stryn – Elverum 4–3
Vedavåg Karmøy – Klepp 1–2
Brann 2 – Radøy 1–1
Dahle – Langevåg 5–2
Nidelv – Levanger 2–0
Vesterålen – Innstranden 1–2
October 16: Moss 2 – Frigg Oslo 1–1
November 3: Birkebeineren – Jerv 2–1

=== Second round ===
October 6: Follo – Lillestrøm 2 2–0 (agg. 2–1)
Nittedal – Grindvoll 2–3 (agg. 2–5)
Elverum – Stryn 4–0 (agg. 7–4)
Vindbjart – Larvik Fotball 1–0 (agg. 2–3)
Porsanger – Salangen 1–3 (agg. 2–5)
October 7: Klepp – Vedavåg Karmøy 4–2 (agg. 6–3)
Langevåg – Dahle 3–0 (agg. 5–5, Langevåg on away goals)
Levanger – Nidelv 3–0 (agg. 3–2)
Innstranden – Vesterålen 2–5 (agg. 4–6)
October 14: Radøy – Brann 2 2–2 (agg. 3–3, Brann 2 on away goals)
October 19: Frigg Oslo – Moss 2 1–0 (agg. 2–1)
November 10: Jerv – Birkebeineren 3–0 (agg. 4–2)

=== Promoted to Second Division 2002 ===
Brann 2, Elverum, Follo, Frigg Oslo, Grindvoll, Jerv, Klepp, Langevåg, Larvik, Levanger, Salangen and Vesterålen

=== Norwegian Cup ===
==== Final ====
4 November 2001
13:15 CET (UTC+1)

Bryne	0–3	Viking
	Report	Eskeland 5' (o.g.); Berre 56'; Tihinen 71'

Ullevaal Stadion, Oslo
Attendance: 25,823
Referee: Kjell Alseth (Stjørdals/Blink)

== UEFA competitions ==
=== Norwegian representatives ===
- Rosenborg (UEFA Champions League)
- Brann (UEFA Champions League)
- Odd Grenland (UEFA Cup, cup winner)
- Viking (UEFA Cup)

=== Champions League ===
==== Qualifying rounds ====
===== Second qualifying round =====
Team 1	Agg.	Team 2	1st leg	2nd leg
Levski Sofia (Bulgaria)	1–1 (a)	(Norway) Brann	0–0	1–1

===== Third qualifying round =====
Team 1	Agg.	Team 2	1st leg	2nd leg
Inter Bratislava (Slovakia)	3–7	(Norway) Rosenborg	3–3	0–4

==== Champions League, Phase 1 ====
===== Group E =====
Pos	Team	Pld	W	D	L	GF	GA	GD	Pts	Qualification	JUV	POR	CEL	ROS
1	(Italy) Juventus	6	3	2	1	11	8	+3	11	Advance to second group stage	—	3–1	3–2	1–0
2	(Portugal) Porto	6	3	1	2	7	5	+2	10	Advance to second group stage	0–0	—	3–0	1–0
3	(Scotland) Celtic	6	3	0	3	8	11	−3	9	Transfer to UEFA Cup	4–3	1–0	—	1–0
4	(Norway) Rosenborg	6	1	1	4	4	6	−2	4		1–1	1–2	2–0	—

Source: RSSSF

Matches

- September 18: Rosenborg – Porto (Portugal) 1–2
- September 25: Rosenborg – Juventus (Italy) 1–1
- October 10: Celtic (Scotland) – Rosenborg 1–0
- October 17: Juventus – Rosenborg 1–0
- October 23: Rosenborg – Celtic 2–0
- October 31: Porto – Rosenborg 1–0

=== UEFA Cup ===
==== Preliminary round ====
August 9: Viking – Brotnjo (Bosnia) 1–0
Stavanger stadion
Att: 2900
1–0 (83) Erik Fuglestad (penalty)
Referee: John Underhill, Scotland.
Red card: Sablic Nino, Brotnjo (90).
Yellow card: Dragan Blathjak, Sablic Nino, Miljenko Sedelj, Brotnjo.

August 23: Brotnjo – Viking 1–1 (agg. 1–2)
Citluk
Att: 5000
0–1 (26) Hannu Tihinen 
1–1 (31) Danijel Krivic 
Referee: Rene Rogala, Switzerland.
Red card: Denis Milos (76), Brotnjo.
Yellow card: Jancevski, Raguz, Jerkovic, Brotnjo.

==== First round ====
September 20: Kilmarnock (Scotland) – Viking 1–1
Rugby Park
Att: 6322
0–1 (45) Tom Sanne 
1–1 (73) Craig Dargo 
Referee: Ivan Dobrinov, Bulgaria.
Yellow card: Hannu Tihinen, Viking.

September 20: Odd Grenland – Helsingborg (Sweden) 2–2
Odd Stadion
Att: 3012
1–0 (9) Morten Fevang
1–1 (23) Mikael Hansson 
2–1 (32) Edwin van Ankeren 
2–2 (56) Alvaro Santos 
Referee: Sten Kaldma, Estonia.
Yellow card: Morten Fevang, Odd Grenland, Bjørn Johansen, Jesper Jansson, 
Helsingborg.

September 27: Helsingborg – Odd Grenland 1–1 (agg. 3–3, Helsingborg on away goals)
Olympia
Att: 4034
1–0 (3) Alvaro Santos
1–1 (43) Morten Fevang 
Referee: Sergiy Shebek, Ukraine.

September 27: Viking – Kilmarnock 2–0 (agg. 3–1)
Stavanger stadion
Att: 4335
1–0 (1) Tom Sanne 
2–0 (18) Erik Nevland 
Referee: Eric Romain, Belgium.
Yellow card: Ally Mitchell, Kilmarnock.

==== Second round ====
October 16: Viking – Hertha BSC Berlin (Germany) 0–1
Stavanger stadion
Att: 3750
0–1 (5) Michael Preetz 
Referee: Miroslav Liba, Czech Republic.
Yellow card: Morten Berre, Hannu Tihinen, Viking, Rob Maas, Bart Goor, Hertha Berlin.

November 1: Hertha BSC Berlin – Viking 2–0 (agg. 3–0)
Olympiastadion
Att: 19.864
1–0 (17) Alex Alves 
2–0 (28) Eijölfur Sverrisson 
Referee: Paul Allaerts, Belgium

== Women's football ==
=== League season ===
==== Toppserien ====
Pos	Team	Pld	W	D	L	GF	GA	GD	Pts	Qualification or relegation
1	Trondheims-Ørn (C)	18	17	1	0	90	13	+77	52	Qualification for the UEFA Women's Cup second qualifying round
2	Kolbotn	18	15	0	3	55	20	+35	45	
3	Arna-Bjørnar	18	13	2	3	41	27	+14	41	
4	Asker	18	11	2	5	59	26	+33	35	
5	Klepp	18	8	2	8	32	38	−6	26	
6	Team Strømmen	18	6	0	12	31	50	−19	18	
7	Røa	18	3	3	12	18	51	−33	12	
8	Byåsen	18	3	3	12	15	64	−49	12	
9	Liungen (R)	18	2	4	12	25	57	−32	10	Relegation to First Division
10	Athene Moss (R)	18	1	5	12	13	33	−20	8	Relegation to First Division

Source: NIFS
Rules for classification: 1) points; 2) goal difference; 3) number of goals scored.
(C) Champions; (R) Relegated

==== 1. divisjon ====
1. Sandviken 16 11 2 3 54- 22 35 Promoted
2. FK Larvik 16 11 2 3 63- 35 32 Promoted
-------------------------------------
3. Follese 16 7 3 6 21- 27 24
4. Fløya 16 6 4 6 28- 31 22
5. Haugar 16 6 3 7 26- 33 21
6. Fortuna 16 6 2 8 34- 33 20
7. Vålerenga 16 4 5 7 30- 27 17
8. Medkila 16 4 5 7 31- 32 17
-------------------------------------
9. Verdal 16 3 2 11 17- 64 11 Relegated
Grand Bodø withdrew before the season because of financial problems.

==== 2. divisjon ====
===== Group 1 =====
1. Skeid 22 22 0 0 145- 11 66 Play-off
2. Kolbotn 2 22 16 2 4 103- 33 50
– - – - – - – - – - – - – - – - – - – -
3. Gjelleråsen 22 13 2 7 64- 55 41 Play-off
4. Bækkelaget 22 11 4 7 75- 40 37
5. Storhamar 22 12 1 9 60- 49 37
6. Asker 2 22 11 2 9 77- 72 35
7. Vallset 22 9 2 11 43- 61 29
8. Team Strømmen 2 22 9 1 12 51- 70 28
9. Skjetten 22 9 0 13 59- 86 27
10. Gjøvik FK 22 4 3 15 36- 78 15
---------------------------------------
11.Kvik Halden 22 3 2 17 30- 91 11 Relegated
12.Kurland 22 3 1 18 16–113 10 Relegated

===== Group 2 =====
1. Fossum (Skien) 16 13 0 3 57–22 39 Play-off
– - – - – - – - – - – - – - – - – - – -
2. Donn 16 12 1 3 53–15 37
3. Amazon Grimstad 16 11 3 2 56–17 36
4. Søgne 16 5 3 8 28–35 18
5. Runar 16 5 3 8 20–40 18
6. Notodden 16 4 4 8 20–40 16 
7. Bingen 16 4 3 9 25–61 15
8. Eik-Tønsberg 16 3 3 10 24–36 12
---------------------------------------
9. Horten FK 16 2 6 8 27–44 12 Relegated

===== Group 3 =====
1. Bryne 7 6 1 0 27- 6 19 Play-off Vestland
2. Hinna 7 4 3 0 15- 3 15 Play-off Vestland
3. Havørn 7 5 0 2 16–12 15 Play-off Vestland
4. Randaberg 7 4 1 2 19–18 13 Play-off Vestland
– - – - – - – - – - – - – - – - – - – -
5. Flekkefjord 7 2 1 4 14–14 7 
6. Austrått 7 2 0 5 14–11 6
7. Vard Haugesund 7 1 0 6 6–25 3
8. Eiger 7 1 0 6 6–28 3

===== Group 4 =====
1. Øygard 9 8 1 0 32- 4 25 Play-off Vestland
2. Sandane 9 6 1 2 39- 8 19 Play-off Vestland
3. Kaupanger 9 6 1 2 31–12 19 Play-off Vestland
4. Nymark 9 5 2 2 30–19 17 Play-off Vestland
5. Arna-Bjørnar 2 9 5 2 2 23–14 17 Play-off Vestland
– - – - – - – - – - – - – - – - – - – -
6. Fyllingen 9 3 2 4 14–26 11
7. Voss 9 3 0 6 17–13 9
8. Bremnes 9 2 1 6 12–29 7
9. Åsane 9 0 3 6 8–36 3
10.Djerv 9 0 1 8 4–49 1

===== Group 5 =====
1. Herd 15 11 3 1 66–20 36 Play-off Møre/Trøndelag
– - – - – - – - – - – - – - – - – - – -
2. Molde 15 9 2 4 50–33 29
3. Stranda 15 7 4 4 33–25 25
4. Træff 15 5 3 7 22–29 18
5. Velledalen/Ringen 15 2 4 9 16–43 10
6. Haramsøy/Nordøy 15 2 2 11 16–53 8

===== Group 6 =====
1. Trondheims/Ørn 2 16 14 1 1 62–12 43
– - – - – - – - – - – - – - – - – - – -
2. Orkla 16 13 0 3 72–32 39 Play-off Møre/Trøndelag
3. Kattem/Leinstrand 16 12 1 3 72–32 37
4. Ranheim 16 7 1 8 73–57 22
5. Rindals/Troll 16 5 2 9 34–44 17
6. Singsås 16 5 1 10 34–63 16
7. Byåsen 2 16 4 3 9 35–41 15
8. Tolga/Tynset 16 3 2 11 26–72 11
---------------------------------------
9. Stadsbygd 16 3 1 12 21–76 10 Relegated

===== Group 7 =====
1. Innstranden 12 12 0 0 77- 5 36 Play-off Nord-Norge
– - – - – - – - – - – - – - – - – - – -
2. Fauske/Sprint 12 6 4 2 42–22 22
3. Grand Bodø 2 12 6 3 3 37–25 21
4. Olderskog 12 5 0 7 24–36 15
5. Sandsnessjøen 12 3 3 6 26–27 12
6. Bossmo/Ytteren 12 2 4 6 14–37 10
---------------------------------------
7. Drevvatn 12 0 2 10 10–78 2 Relegated

===== Group 8 =====
1. Håkvik 12 9 2 1 60–21 29 Play-off Nord-Norge
– - – - – - – - – - – - – - – - – - – -
2. Leknes 12 8 1 3 72–27 25 
3. Stålbrott 12 8 0 4 50–36 24
4. Narvik FK 12 6 0 6 29–30 18
5. Morild 12 4 1 7 27–41 13
6. Kvæfjord 12 3 0 9 11–44 9 
---------------------------------------
7. Medkila 2/Brage/Trondenes 2 12 2 0 10 16–66 6 Relegated

===== Group 9 =====
1. Alta 14 13 0 1 69–12 39 Play-off Nord-Norge
– - – - – - – - – - – - – - – - – - – -
2. Tromsdalen 14 12 1 1 77–11 37
3. Pioner 14 9 0 5 58–22 27
4. Fløya 2 14 7 3 4 61–32 24
5. Salangen 14 6 2 6 39–47 20
6. Kvaløysletta 14 4 0 10 24–63 12
---------------------------------------
7. HIF/Stein 14 2 0 12 25–52 6 Relegated
8. Sørreisa 14 0 0 14 7–121 0 Relegated

=== Play-off Vestland ===
1. Nymark 8 6 1 1 32- 8 19 Play-off
– - – - – - – - – - – - – - – - – - – -
2. Bryne 8 5 1 2 23–13 16
3. Sandane 8 4 2 2 22–11 14
4. Kaupanger 8 4 2 2 21–15 14
5. Øygard 8 4 1 3 23–14 13
6. Hinna 8 3 2 3 19–13 11
7. Arna-Bjørnar 2 8 3 1 4 12–23 10
8. Havørn 8 1 1 6 10–20 4
9. Randaberg 8 0 1 7 9–54 1

=== Play-out Group 3 ===
1. Flekkefjord 6 4 0 2 19–10 12
2. Vard Haugesund 6 4 0 2 13- 8 12
---------------------------------------
3. Austrått 6 2 1 3 11–14 7
4. Eiger 6 1 1 4 8–19 4

=== Play-out Group 4 ===
1. Voss 8 6 1 1 25–10 19
2. Bremnes 8 5 2 1 23–13 17 
3. Fyllingen 8 3 3 2 18–17 12
---------------------------------------
4. Djerv 8 1 3 4 7–13 6
5. Åsane 8 0 1 7 4–24 1

=== Play-off Møre/Trøndelag ===
September 23: Herd – Orkla 1–0

Herd to play-off. (Match in Sunndalsøra)

=== Play-off Nord-Norge ===
September 21: Innstranden – Håkvik 1–0
September 22: Innstranden – Alta 5–0
September 23: Håkvik – Alta

(Tournament in Narvik)

1. Innstranden 2 2 0 0 6- 0 6 Play-off
– - – - – - – - – - – - – - – - – - – -
2. Håkvik 1 0 0 1 0- 1 0
3. Alta 1 0 0 2 0- 5 0

=== Play-off Group A ===
September 29: Skeid – Herd 5–0
October 7: Innstranden – Skeid 0–0
October 14: Herd – Innstranden 0–4

1. Skeid 2 1 1 0 5- 0 4 Promoted
---------------------------------------
2. Innstranden 2 1 1 0 4- 0 4
3. Herd 2 0 0 2 0- 9 0

=== Play-off Group B ===
1. Gjelleråsen 2 2 0 0 6- 1 6 Promoted
---------------------------------------
2. Nymark 2 1 0 1 2- 5 3
3. Fossum (Skien) 2 0 0 2 2- 4 0

== Women's European Cup ==
=== Norwegian representatives ===
- Trondheims/Ørn (UEFA Cup)

=== UEFA Cup ===
==== Group 1 ====
- In Trondheim

September 20: Trondheims/Ørn – KR Reykjavik (Iceland) 9–0
September 22: Trondheims/Ørn – Babruyshanka (Bulgaria) 6–1
September 24: Eendracht Aalst (Belgium) – Trondheims/Ørn 0–8

1.Trondheims-Ørn 3 3 0 0 23- 1 9
2.FC Babruyshanka 3 2 0 1 8- 8 6
3.KSC Eendracht Aalst 3 1 0 2 5–15 3
4.KR (Reykjavík) 3 0 0 3 4–16 0

==== Quarter-finals ====
March 16: Trondheims/Ørn – HJK Helsinki (Finland) 2–1
March 28: HJK Helsinki – Trondheims/Ørn 2–0 (agg. 3–2)

== National teams ==
=== Norway men's national football team ===
Date	Venue	Opponent	Res.*	Comp.	Norwegian goalscorers
January 24	Hong Kong	South Korea	3–2	F	Frode Johnsen (2), Thorstein Helstad
February 28	Belfast	Northern Ireland	4–0	F	Thorstein Helstad (2), John Carew, Ståle Stensaas
March 24	Oslo	Poland	2–3	WCQ	John Carew, Ole Gunnar Solskjær
March 28	Minsk	Belarus	1–2	WCQ	Ole Gunnar Solskjær
April 25	Oslo	Bulgaria	2–1	F	Øyvind Leonhardsen (2)
June 2	Kyiv	Ukraine	0–0	WCQ
June 6	Oslo	Belarus	1–1	WCQ	John Carew
August 15	Oslo	Turkey	1–1	WCQ	Ole Gunnar Solskjær
September 1	Chorzów	Poland	0–3	WCQ
September 5	Oslo	Wales	3–2	WCQ	Ronny Johnsen, John Carew, Frode Johnsen
October 6	Yerevan	Armenia	4–1	WCQ	Bård Borgersen (2), John Carew (2)

Note: Norway's goals first
Explanation:

- F = Friendly
- WCQ = FIFA World Cup 2002 Qualifier

=== Norway women's national football team ===
January 12: Norway – Sweden 2–1, friendly 
February 17: France – Norway 0–0, friendly 
March 11: Norway – Finland 5–1, friendly 
March 13: Norway – China 0–2, friendly 
March 15: Norway – Denmark 1–0, friendly 
March 17: Norway – United States 4–3, friendly 
May 13: Norway – Sweden 3–1, friendly 
June 19: Norway – Canada 9–1, friendly 
June 25: Norway – France 3–0, European Championship 
1.round 
June 28: Norway – Italy 1–1, European Championship
1.round 
July 1: Denmark – Norway 1–0, European Championship 
1.round 
July 4: Germany – Norway 1–0, European Championship semifinal 
September 8: Norway – Ukraine 4–0, World Cup qualifier 
September 11: Norway – Czech Republic 5–0, World Cup qualifier 
October 13: France – Norway 0–3, World Cup qualifier
