= Jørgen Neumann =

Norwegian footballer and manager (born 1966)

Personal information
- Date of birth: 2 January 1966 (age 60)
- Position: Defender

Youth career
- Eidsvold Turn

Senior career*
Years	Team	Apps	(Gls)
1983–1994	Eidsvold Turn		
1995	Kongsvinger	22	(0)
1996	Eidsvold Turn		
1997–	Bjerke		

Managerial career
- 1997–2000: Bjerke
- 2001−2002: Grindvoll
- −2008: Eidsvold Turn (coach)
- 2009: Ull/Kisa (assistant coach)
- * Club domestic league appearances and goals

Jørgen Neumann (born 2 January 1966) is a Norwegian football manager and former defender.

Hailing from Råholt, he made his debut for Eidsvold Turn as a teenager. Spending almost his entire career in Eidsvold Turn, he achieved the club record of 295 appearances across all competitions. The record stood until 2007. In 1995 he took one season in Kongsvinger, playing 22 Eliteserien games.

After a period as player-manager of Bjerke, which he led to promotion to the 1998 2. Divisjon, he took over Grindvoll IL in 2001 and guided them to promotion to the 2002 2. Divisjon. Following the immediate relegation he resigned. He eventually rejoined Eidsvold Turn as a part of the coaching team. In 2009 he joined Ullensaker/Kisa IL as assistant coach, staying for one season. He was also a sports teacher at Eidsvoll Upper Secondary School.
