= Vestby IL =

Norwegian sports club

- Full name: Vestby Idrettslag
- Founded: 4 June 1917
- Ground: Risil kunstgress, Pepperstad skog
- League: Seventh Division (but HSV Fotball in Fourth Division)

Vestby Idrettslag is a Norwegian sports club from Vestby, Akershus. It has sections for association football, track and field, Nordic skiing and amateur boxing.

It was founded on 4 June 1917. In 1940 Vestby IF merged with the AIF club Vestby AIL to form Vestby IL.

The men's football team currently plays in the Third Division, the fourth tier of football in Norway. It last played in the Third Division (fourth tier) in 1997. However, the club also contributed to the umbrella team HSV Fotball (Hølen, Son og Vestby Fotball) which plays in the Fourth Division.
