= Kalandseid IL =

Norwegian sports club

- Full name: Kalandseid Idrettslag
- Founded: 1962
- Ground: Kalandseid idrettsplass, Kaland, Bergen
- League: 6. Divisjon
Home colours

Kalandseid Idrettslag is a Norwegian sports club from Bergen. It has sections for football, team handball, track and field and gymnastics.

The club was founded in 1962. The men's football team currently resides in the Fifth Division (sixth tier). It last played in the Third Division in 1997. Henrik moe and Ole petter Birkenes was The star players, with Rolf Moe as the manager.
