= IF Herkules =

Norwegian sports club from Skien, Telemark

- Full name: Idrettsforeningen Herkules
- Founded: 4 May 1920
- Ground: Herkules idrettspark, Skien

Idrettsforeningen Herkules is a Norwegian multi-sports club from Skien, Telemark. It is organized as an alliance club with independent sections for association football, team handball, track and field athletics, gymnastics, Nordic skiing and speed skating.

The club was founded on 4 May 1920 and used a moor next to Skiensfjorden Skofabrikk. The club colours are yellow and green.

The men's football team ended last in the 2019 4. divisjon. It was formerly a staple in the 3. divisjon, with a presence from 2000 to 2002 and 2004 to 2013. Earlier, after World War II, the club had spells on Norway's second tier in 1952–53 and 1955–56. It is also known as the childhood club of Rune Almenning Jarstein.
