= Drangedal IL =

Norwegian sports club

- Full name: Drangedal Idrettslag
- Founded: 1907
- Ground: Drangedal stadion, Prestestranda
- League: Fifth Division
Home colours

Drangedal Idrettslag is a Norwegian sports club from Drangedal Municipality in Telemark county. It has sections for association football, team handball, Nordic skiing and gymnastics.

It was founded under the name Drang in 1907. In 1945 it changed its name as it incorporated the workers' sports club Drangedal AIL. In 1953 it lacked a sections for gymnastics, but had a section for track and field.

The men's football team played in the Third Division, the fourth tier of Norwegian football from 1994 to 1995 and 2002 to 2004. The men's team now plays in the Fifth Division and the women's team in the Third Division. Kjell Roar Kaasa has played for the club.
