= Tasta IL =

Norwegian football club

- Full name: Tasta Idrettslag
- Founded: 1963
- Ground: Stemmen kunstgress, Stavanger
- League: Fourth Division
Home colours

Tasta Idrettslag is a Norwegian association football club from Tasta, Stavanger, Rogaland.

It was established in 1963. The men's football team currently plays in the Fourth Division, the fifth tier of Norwegian football. The team played in the Third Division from 2000 to 2002.
