= Singsås IL =

Norwegian sports club

- Full name: Singsås Idrettslag
- Founded: 1920
- Ground: Singsås gras, Singsås
- League: 6. Divisjon
Home colours

Singsås Idrettslag is a Norwegian multi-sports club from Singsås, Sør-Trøndelag. It has sections for football, handball, Nordic skiing and athletics.

The club was founded in 1920. The men's football team currently plays in the 6. Divisjon, the seventh tier of Norwegian football. It had a stint in the 3. divisjon from 1996 to 1999.
