= Buøy IL =

Norwegian sports club

- Full name: Buøy Idrettslag
- Founded: 1909
- Ground: Buøy kunstgras, Stavanger
- League: Fourth Division
Home colours

Buøy Idrettslag is a Norwegian sports club from Buøy, Stavanger, Rogaland. It has sections for association football and gymnastics.

The men's football team plays in the Fourth Division, the fifth tier of Norwegian football. It formerly had a long stint in the Third Division from 2002 to 2010. It even contested a Playoff to the 2. Divisjon in 2003, but narrowly lost to Sandnes FK.
