= SK Trane =

Norwegian football club

- Full name: Sportsklubben Trane
- Founded: 7 October 1934
- Ground: Krohnsminde, Årstad, Bergen
- League: sixth Division
Home colours

Sportsklubben Trane is a Norwegian football club from Årstad, Bergen.

The club was founded on 15 December 1918. The club colors are green and white. The men's football team currently resides in the Fifth Division (sixth tier). It last played in the Third Division from 2000 to 2003.

Famous Players:

Bård Finne

Eirik Birkelund

Agami Hando

Knut Walde
