= SK Nationalkameratene =

Norwegian sports club

Nationalkameratene
- Full name: Sportsklubben Nationalkameratene
- Founded: 21 May 1920
- Ground: Hallset kunstgress, Trondheim
- League: Fifth Division
Home colours

Sportsklubben Nationalkameratene is a Norwegian sports club from Trondheim, Sør-Trøndelag. It has sections for association football and team handball.

It was established on 21 May 1920.

The men's football team currently plays in the Fifth Division, the sixth tier of Norwegian football. It last played in the Second Division in 1998, and last in the Third Division in 2008.
