= Seljord IL =

Norwegian sports club

- Full name: Seljord Idrettslag
- Founded: 1902
- Ground: Eventyrøy, Seljord Municipality
- League: Sixth Division
Home colours

Seljord Idrettslag is a Norwegian sports club from Seljord Municipality in Telemark county. It has sections for association football, team handball, Nordic skiing and equestrianism.

It was founded in 1902 and is thus among the oldest sports clubs in Norway. In 1953 it lacked a section for equestrianism, but had a section for track and field.

The men's football team played in the Third Division, the fourth tier of Norwegian football, from 1999 to 2004. The men's team played in the Fifth Division in 2010, but pulled the team mid-season. From 2013 the team plays in the Sixth Division.
