= Rælingen FK =

Norwegian football club

- Full name: Rælingen Fotballklubb
- Founded: 31 March 1930
- Ground: Marikollen kunstgress
- League: Fourth Division
- 2023: 3rd, Akershus
Home colours

Rælingen Fotballklubb is a Norwegian association football club from Rælingen.

It was founded on 31 March 1930 as Rælingen SK. In 1938 it was merged with the local skiing club, but the entities were demerged again in 1948. Not long after, the club built a new football stadium. Rælingen SK were members of the Workers' Sports Confederation while it existed. In 1946 it also incorporated another AIF club AIL Fremad.

The men's football team last played in the Third Division (fourth tier) in 2014 and 2015. The team was a mainstay in the Third Division throughout the 90s until 1999 and quickly returned for another stint from 2001 to 2005. The team also had a single-season stint in 2010.
