= Leknes FK =

Norwegian football club

- Full name: Leknes Fotballklubb
- Founded: 2 February 1989
- Ground: Leknes kunstgress, Leknes
- League: Fourth Division
- 2024: 8th

Leknes Fotballklubb is a Norwegian association football club from Leknes, Lofoten.

The club was founded on 2 February 1989 as a breakaway club from Leknes OIF. The club had certain ambitions on becoming the leading club in Lofoten which would gather talents from the region.

The men's football team currently plays in the Fourth Division, the fifth tier of football in Norway. The team enjoyed spells in the Third Division from 1994 to 2000, 2002 to 2010, and finally a one-off season in 2019.

The women's football team currently plays in the Third Division.

The women's football team was fairly competitive in Northern Norway, spending many years in the Second Division. In 2002, the team won its local group and participated in a playoff against other group winners in Northern Norway, Innstranden and Tromsdalen, which Leknes lost. This repeated itself in 2003 and 2004, with Leknes both times losing the playoff to Grand Bodø and Tromsdalen. In 2006, Tromsdalen and Innstranden proved too difficult. Their last stint in the Second Division happened from 2017 to 2019, the last year as a cooperation team with Ballstad.
