= 1998 Norwegian Second Division =

Football season in Norway 2nd division

In the 1998 2. divisjon, the third highest football league for men in Norway, 22 games were played in eight groups, with three points given for wins and one for draws. Liv/Fossekallen, Skjetten, Clausenengen and Lofoten were promoted to the First Division through playoffs against the other 4 group winners. Number twelve, thirteen and fourteen were relegated to the 3. divisjon. The winning teams from each of the 19 groups in the 3. divisjon, plus some number-two teams, were promoted to the 2. divisjon.

== League tables ==
=== Group 1 ===
Pos	Team	Pld	W	D	L	GF	GA	GD	Pts	Promotion or relegation
1	Liv/Fossekallen (P)	22	16	4	2	51	14	+37	52	Promotion to First Division
2	Årvoll	22	12	4	6	60	39	+21	40	
3	Lyn 2	22	11	4	7	47	35	+12	37	
4	Faaberg	22	11	3	8	46	37	+9	36	
5	Lillestrøm 2	22	10	5	7	46	35	+11	35	
6	Sprint-Jeløy	22	10	5	7	46	42	+4	35	
7	Drøbak/Frogn	22	10	1	11	38	40	−2	31	
8	Jevnaker	22	7	7	8	31	35	−4	28	
9	Gjøvik-Lyn	22	7	7	8	36	41	−5	28	
10	Strømmen (R)	22	6	3	13	34	52	−18	21	Relegation to Third Division
11	Jotun (R)	22	5	3	14	30	61	−31	18	Relegation to Third Division
12	Bjerke (R)	22	1	6	15	24	58	−34	9	Relegation to Third Division

(P) Promoted; (R) Relegated

=== Group 2 ===
Pos	Team	Pld	W	D	L	GF	GA	GD	Pts	Promotion or relegation
1	Skjetten (P)	22	16	2	4	58	20	+38	50	Promotion to First Division
2	Sarpsborg	22	16	2	4	57	26	+31	50	
3	Stabæk 2	22	13	1	8	52	43	+9	40	
4	Grei	22	10	4	8	33	32	+1	34	
5	Bærum	22	11	0	11	57	49	+8	33	
6	Lørenskog	22	10	3	9	35	35	0	33	
7	Abildsø	22	10	1	11	43	52	−9	31	
8	Elverum	22	9	2	11	43	46	−3	29	
9	Nybergsund	22	8	4	10	33	31	+2	28	
10	Fossum (R)	22	7	4	11	39	41	−2	25	Relegation to Third Division
11	Rakkestad (R)	22	7	4	11	39	49	−10	25	Relegation to Third Division
12	Ham-Kam 2 (R)	22	1	1	20	15	80	−65	4	Relegation to Third Division

(P) Promoted; (R) Relegated

=== Group 3 ===
Pos	Team	Pld	W	D	L	GF	GA	GD	Pts	Relegation
1	Ørn-Horten	22	14	5	3	67	34	+33	47	
2	Fredrikstad	22	14	5	3	47	17	+30	47	
3	Sandefjord	22	11	7	4	41	29	+12	40	
4	Runar	22	8	10	4	45	29	+16	34	
5	Vålerenga 2	22	9	6	7	58	46	+12	33	
6	Ski	22	9	6	7	39	37	+2	33	
7	Råde	22	10	2	10	47	50	−3	32	
8	Drafn	22	6	8	8	42	56	−14	26	
9	Østsiden	22	7	4	11	41	47	−6	25	
10	Mjøndalen (R)	22	6	6	10	38	42	−4	24	Relegation to Third Division
11	Larvik Turn (R)	22	3	4	15	26	56	−30	13	Relegation to Third Division
12	Åssiden (R)	22	1	5	16	25	73	−48	8	Relegation to Third Division

(R) Relegated

=== Group 4 ===
Pos	Team	Pld	W	D	L	GF	GA	GD	Pts	Relegation
1	Vidar	22	13	7	2	65	30	+35	46	
2	Pors Grenland	22	11	4	7	48	30	+18	37	
3	Mandalskameratene	22	9	9	4	41	26	+15	36	
4	Haugesund 2	22	10	4	8	59	48	+11	34	
5	Sandnes	22	8	8	6	31	29	+2	32	
6	Sola	22	9	5	8	30	39	−9	32	
7	Ålgård	22	8	7	7	35	44	−9	31	
8	Flekkefjord	22	6	11	5	38	33	+5	29	
9	Randaberg	22	7	8	7	45	41	+4	29	
10	Eiger (R)	22	6	5	11	22	42	−20	23	Relegation to Third Division
11	Jerv (R)	22	5	6	11	34	47	−13	21	Relegation to Third Division
12	Klepp (R)	22	1	4	17	31	70	−39	7	Relegation to Third Division

(R) Relegated

=== Group 5 ===
Pos	Team	Pld	W	D	L	GF	GA	GD	Pts	Relegation
1	Fyllingen	22	17	4	1	69	23	+46	55	
2	Åsane	22	17	2	3	59	27	+32	53	
3	Stord	22	10	5	7	46	35	+11	35	
4	Fana	22	10	4	8	42	33	+9	34	
5	Brann 2	22	9	5	8	40	36	+4	32	
6	Vard Haugesund	22	9	4	9	42	41	+1	31	
7	Os	22	8	5	9	44	49	−5	29	
8	Førde	22	9	2	11	36	41	−5	29	
9	Sogndal 2	22	7	2	13	33	61	−28	23	
10	Stryn (R)	22	6	3	13	34	47	−13	21	Relegation to Third Division
11	Nest-Sotra (R)	22	4	5	13	29	52	−23	17	Relegation to Third Division
12	Vedavåg (R)	22	4	3	15	39	68	−29	15	Relegation to Third Division

(R) Relegated

=== Group 6 ===
Pos	Team	Pld	W	D	L	GF	GA	GD	Pts	Promotion or relegation
1	Clausenengen (P)	22	15	5	2	69	20	+49	50	Promotion to First Division
2	Molde 2	22	12	2	8	58	31	+27	38	
3	Skarbøvik	22	10	7	5	39	29	+10	37	
4	Verdal	22	11	3	8	49	41	+8	36	
5	Steinkjer	22	9	5	8	40	39	+1	32	
6	Averøykameratene	22	8	8	6	34	40	−6	32	
7	Orkdal/Orkanger	22	7	7	8	33	42	−9	28	
8	Volda	22	8	2	12	41	47	−6	26	
9	Træff	22	7	4	11	28	45	−17	25	
10	Kristiansund (R)	22	7	2	13	30	44	−14	23	Relegation to Third Division
11	Åndalsnes (R)	22	6	5	11	30	50	−20	23	Relegation to Third Division
12	Aalesund 2 (R)	45	8	11	26	49	–23	—	35	Relegation to Third Division

(P) Promoted; (R) Relegated

=== Group 7 ===
Pos	Team	Pld	W	D	L	GF	GA	GD	Pts	Relegation
1	Rosenborg 2	22	15	4	3	71	24	+47	49	
2	Mo	22	15	3	4	47	33	+14	48	
3	Narvik	22	12	6	4	38	23	+15	42	
4	Kolstad	22	12	2	8	54	47	+7	38	
5	Bodø/Glimt 2	22	11	4	7	48	39	+9	37	
6	Ranheim	22	9	7	6	52	42	+10	34	
7	Nardo	22	9	3	10	39	40	−1	30	
8	Gevir Bodø	22	5	9	8	45	48	−3	24	
9	Mosjøen	22	6	5	11	35	46	−11	23	
10	Bangsund (R)	22	5	4	13	22	47	−25	19	Relegation to Third Division
11	Nationalkam (R)	22	3	5	14	37	63	−26	14	Relegation to Third Division
12	Stjørdals/Blink (R)	22	4	0	18	36	72	−36	12	Relegation to Third Division

(R) Relegated

=== Group 8 ===
Pos	Team	Pld	W	D	L	GF	GA	GD	Pts	Promotion or relegation
1	Lofoten (P)	22	19	2	1	82	36	+46	59	Promotion to First Division
2	Tromsdalen	22	15	3	4	60	24	+36	48	
3	Harstad	22	14	5	3	63	24	+39	47	
4	Alta	22	13	3	6	92	40	+52	42	
5	Hammerfest	22	9	6	7	53	53	0	33	
6	Skjervøy	22	10	2	10	52	52	0	32	
7	Finnsnes	22	9	3	10	40	39	+1	30	
8	Lyngen/Karnes	22	7	5	10	45	65	−20	26	
9	Silsand/Omegn	22	6	1	15	41	65	−24	19	
10	Ulfstind (R)	22	5	3	14	35	64	−29	18	Relegation to Third Division
11	Morild (R)	22	4	5	13	30	64	−34	17	Relegation to Third Division
12	Polarstjernen (R)	22	1	2	19	28	95	−67	5	Relegation to Third Division

(P) Promoted; (R) Relegated
