= IL Ulfstind =

Norwegian sports club

- Full name: Idrettslaget Ulfstind
- Founded: 2 April 1966
- Ground: Tønsnes kunstgressbane, Tønsnes, Tromsø
- League: 3. divisjon
- 2024: 3. divisjon group 6, 10th of 14
Home colours

Idrettslaget Ulfstind is a Norwegian sports club from Tromsø, Troms. It has sections for association football and skiing

It was founded as a sports section of UL Ulfstind on 2 April 1966, and IL Ulfstind became a separate entity on 10 January 1981. In 1992 it incorporated the club UL Samhug.

The men's football team currently plays in the Third Division, the fourth tier of Norwegian football. It last played in the Norwegian Second Division in 1998.
