= IL Trott =

Norwegian football club

- Full name: Idrettslaget Trott
- Founded: 1948
- Ground: Prestegardsskogen gras
- League: Fourth Division
Home colours

Idrettslaget Trott is a Norwegian association football club from Rommetveit in Stord Municipality in Vestland county.

The men's football team currently plays in the Fourth Division, the fifth tier of Norwegian football. It last played in the Norwegian Second Division in 1997.
