= Figgjo IL =

Norwegian sports club

- Full name: Figgjo Idrettslag
- Founded: 1 August 1927
- Ground: Figgjo stadion Figgjo
- League: Fourth Division
Home colours

Figgjo Idrettslag is a Norwegian sports club from Sandnes. It has sections for association football, team handball, Nordic skiing, biathlon and gymnastics.

The men's football team currently plays in the Fourth Division, the fifth tier of Norwegian football. The team had a long stint in the Third Division from 1992 and until 2005; before that they played in the 1991 2. Divisjon. Their team colors are blue with yellow away colours.

Biathletes from Figgjo IL include Åse Idland and Annette Sikveland.
