= Rakkestad IF =

Norwegian sports club

- Full name: Rakkestad Idrettsforening
- Nickname(s): RIF
- Founded: 11 November 1914
- Ground: Rakkestad stadion, Rakkestad
- Manager: Lars-Jørgen Myrvold
- League: 4. divisjon
- 2019: 12th
Home colours

Rakkestad Idrettsforening is a Norwegian sports club from Rakkestad, Østfold. It has sections for association football, team handball, floorball, volleyball, track and field, gymnastics, skiing and speed skating.

It was founded on 11 November 1914. Home field is Rakkestad Stadium, and club colors are blue and white.

The men's football team currently plays in the 4. divisjon, the fifth tier of Norwegian football. It last played in the 2. divisjon in 1998, and after that had three spells in the 3. division: 1999, 2001–2005 and 2009–2010. Its best player ever is Bent Skammelsrud.
