= IL Polarstjernen =

Norwegian sports club

- Full name: Idrettslaget Polarstjernen
- Founded: 1917
- Ground: Polarsletta stadion, Vestre Jakobselv
- League: Second Division (women)
Home colours

Idrettslaget Polarstjernen is a Norwegian sports club from the village of Vestre Jakobselv in Vadsø Municipality in Finnmark county. It has sections for association football, cycling, biathlon, and skiing.

In 2026, one local website, said that the women's football team is currently defunct.

The men's football team is currently defunct. It last played in the Norwegian Second Division in 1998 and the Norwegian Third Division in 2004.
