= Hana IL =

Norwegian sports club

- Full name: Hana Idrettslag
- Founded: 1976
- Ground: Hanabanen, Sandnes
- League: Fourth Division
Home colours

Hana Idrettslag is a Norwegian sports club from Sandnes, Rogaland. It has sections for association football, team handball and volleyball.

It was established in 1976, and the club colors are yellow and blue.

The men's football team currently plays in the Fourth Division, the fifth tier of Norwegian football. It last played in the Second Division in 1996. The women's football team plays in the Third Division.
