= Bjerke IL =

Norwegian sports club

- Full name: Bjerke Idrettslag
- Founded: 15 March 1936
- League: none
Home colours

Bjerke Idrettslag is a Norwegian sports club from Nannestad, Akershus. It has sections for association football, skiing and biathlon.

It was founded on 15 March 1936 as Bjerke AIL, a team in Arbeidernes Idrettsforbund. It had a certain predecessor in Bjerke SK, which existed from 1896 to 1935.

The men's football team is now a part of Nannestad FK, founded in 2009. Bjerke IL last played in the Norwegian Second Division in 1998.

== Coach ==
- 1997-2000 Jørgen Neumann, as player-manager
