= Åndalsnes IF =

Norwegian sports club

- Full name: Åndalsnes Idrettsforening
- Founded: 25 May 1917
- Ground: Øran stadion, Åndalsnes
- League: Men: 4. divisjon Nordmøre og Romsdal (tier 5)
- 2018: Men: 4. divisjon Nordmøre og Romsdal (tier 5), 5th
Home colours

Åndalsnes Idrettsforening is a Norwegian sports club from Åndalsnes, Møre og Romsdal. It has sections for association football, team handball, floorball, gymnastics, track and field and skiing.

It was founded on 25 May 1917.

The men's football team currently plays in the Third Division, the fourth tier of Norwegian football. It last played in the Norwegian Second Division in 1998. It last played in the Norwegian First Division in 1995.

== Recent seasons ==
=== Men ===
Season	Level	Division	Section	Position	Movements	Note/ source
1999	Tier 4	3. divisjon	Nordmøre og Romsdal avd. 13	3rd/12		
2000	Tier 4	3. divisjon	Nordmøre og Romsdal avd. 13	4th/12		
2001	Tier 4	3. divisjon	Nordmøre og Romsdal avd. 18	3rd/12		
2002	Tier 4	3. divisjon	Nordmøre og Romsdal avd. 18	9th/12		
2003	Tier 4	3. divisjon	Nordmøre og Romsdal avd. 18	8th/12		
2004	Tier 4	3. divisjon	Nordmøre og Romsdal avd. 18	11th/12		
2005	Tier 4	3. divisjon	Nordmøre og Romsdal avd. 18	12th/12	Relegated	
2006	Tier 5	4. divisjon	Nordmøre og Romsdal	6th/12		
2007	Tier 5	4. divisjon	Nordmøre og Romsdal	6th/12		
2008	Tier 5	4. divisjon	Nordmøre og Romsdal	1st/11	Promoted	
2009	Tier 4	3. divisjon	Nordmøre og Romsdal avd. 18	8th/12		
2010	Tier 4	3. divisjon	Nordmøre og Romsdal avd. 18	12th/12	Relegated	
2011	Tier 5	4. divisjon	Nordmøre og Romsdal	4th/12		
2012	Tier 5	4. divisjon	Nordmøre og Romsdal	7th/12		
2013	Tier 5	4. divisjon	Nordmøre og Romsdal	4th/12		
2014	Tier 5	4. divisjon	Nordmøre og Romsdal	6th/12		
2015	Tier 5	4. divisjon	Nordmøre og Romsdal	10th/12		
2016	Tier 5	4. divisjon	Nordmøre og Romsdal	11th/12	Relegated	
2017	Tier 6	5. divisjon	Nordmøre og Romsdal	3rd/12	Promoted	
2018	Tier 5	4. divisjon	Nordmøre og Romsdal	5th/12		

=== Women ===
Season	Level	Division	Section	Position	Movements	Note/ source
2005	Tier 4	3. divisjon	Nordmøre og Romsdal	9th/11		
2006	did not participate					
2007	did not participate					
2008	did not participate					
2009	Tier 4	3. divisjon	Nordmøre og Romsdal	8th/8		
