= Eiger FK =

Norwegian sports club

- Full name: Eiger Fotballklubb
- Founded: 19 March 1961
- Ground: Hålå kunstgras, Eigerøy
- League: Fourth Division
- 2023: Third Division group 3, 13th of 14 (relegated)
Home colours

Eiger Fotballklubb, formerly Eiger Idrettslag, is a Norwegian association football club from Eigerøy, Rogaland.

It was founded on 19 March 1961.

The men's football team will in 2011 play in the Fourth Division, the fifth tier of Norwegian football. It last played in the Norwegian Second Division in 1998.
