= Sandnes FK =

Norwegian football club

- Full name: Sandnes Fotballklubb
- Founded: 1997, disestablished 2004
- Ground: Sandnes stadion

Sandnes Fotballklubb was a Norwegian association football club from Sandnes. It existed from late 1997 to early 2004, and was in the end incorporated by Ulf-Sandnes to form Sandnes Ulf. A cooperation between several Sandnes-based clubs, it played some time in the Norwegian Second Division, and had won promotion to the Second Division when it ceased to exist, but struggled with bad economy.

== History ==
Sandnes FK was founded in January 1997 as an umbrella club for eleven teams in the Sandnes district. FK Haugesund was an inspiration.

It played in the 2001 Norwegian Second Division, but was relegated to the Third Division after that season. As a result, the other clubs stopped backing Sandnes FK. Sandnes FK tried their luck on their own in the 2002 season.

In early 2003 many started advocating a new merger in the city. In February 2003 people came forward with a wish to merge Sandnes FK and Ulf-Sandnes, with support from Sandved IL, and to hire Benny Lennartsson as head coach. In March an "intensjonsavtale" was signed between the two clubs. The plan received a blow in April, when Benny Lennartsson declared himself unavailable, as his wife had unfortunately not been hired at Stavanger University College. The plan was not scrapped, but it was said that the plan depended on either Sandnes FK or Ulf-Sandnes winning promotion. Sandnes FK won their Third Division group, whereas Ulf-Sandnes was relegated. This increased the keenness of both parts to cooperate. Talks started after the season. In late 2003 the mayor of Sandnes stood forward in advertisements, donning the Sandnes FK jersey, to gather popular and commercial support for a new club.

By early 2004, plans had been made, and approved by the board of directors in both clubs as well as the Football Association of Norway. First, the annual convention in Sandnes FK would take place on 9 February, and agree to discontinue the club and grant Ulf-Sandnes its spot in the league system. On 10 February, Ulf-Sandnes would change its name to "Sandnes Ulf" to carry on a certain legacy from Sandnes FK. This was agreed to, and Sandnes FK ceased to exist.

The economy of Sandnes FK was never in the best of shapes. In July 2003 the club barely escaped bankruptcy. The economy improved after the merger.
