= Åssiden IF =

Norwegian sports club

- Full name: Åssiden Idrettsforening
- Nickname: Åssia
- Founded: 10 September 1937
- Ground: Åssiden stadion, Drammen
- League: 4. divisjon
- 2025: 13th (relegated)
Home colours

Åssiden Idrettsforening (nicknamed "Åssia") is a Norwegian sports club from Drammen, Buskerud. It has sections for association football and handball, and skiing, previously also bandy.

It was founded on 10 September 1937 as Åssiden AIF, being a part of the Workers' Confederation of Sports. Åssiden was initially a part of Lier but was subsequently incorporated into the Drammen municipality.

The men's football team currently plays in 3. divisjon, the fourth tier of the Norwegian football league system, since their promotion from the 2019 4. divisjon. The club last played in 2. divisjon in 1998, and in the 1. divisjon as late as in 1993.
