= IL Morild =

Norwegian football club

- Full name: Idrettslaget Morild
- Founded: 26 July 1937
- Ground: Øksnes idrettspark, Myre
- League: Fifth Division
Home colours

Idrettslaget Morild is a Norwegian association football club from Myre, Øksnes, Nordland.

It is named after Noctilucales. It was founded on 26 July 1937 as IL Bjørn ("Bear"), but seeing as another team with this name existed, they had to change to IL Morild. It formerly had sections for track and field and skiing.

The men's football team currently plays in the Fifth Division, the sixth tier of Norwegian football. It last played in the Norwegian Second Division in 1998 and the Norwegian Third Division in 2010.
