= 1993 Norwegian Football Cup =

Norgesmesterskapet i fotball for herrer

Tournament details
- Country: Norway
- Teams: 128 (main competition)

Final positions
- Champions: Bodø/Glimt (2nd title)
- Runners-up: Strømsgodset

Tournament statistics
- Top goal scorer: Mons Ivar Mjelde (7)

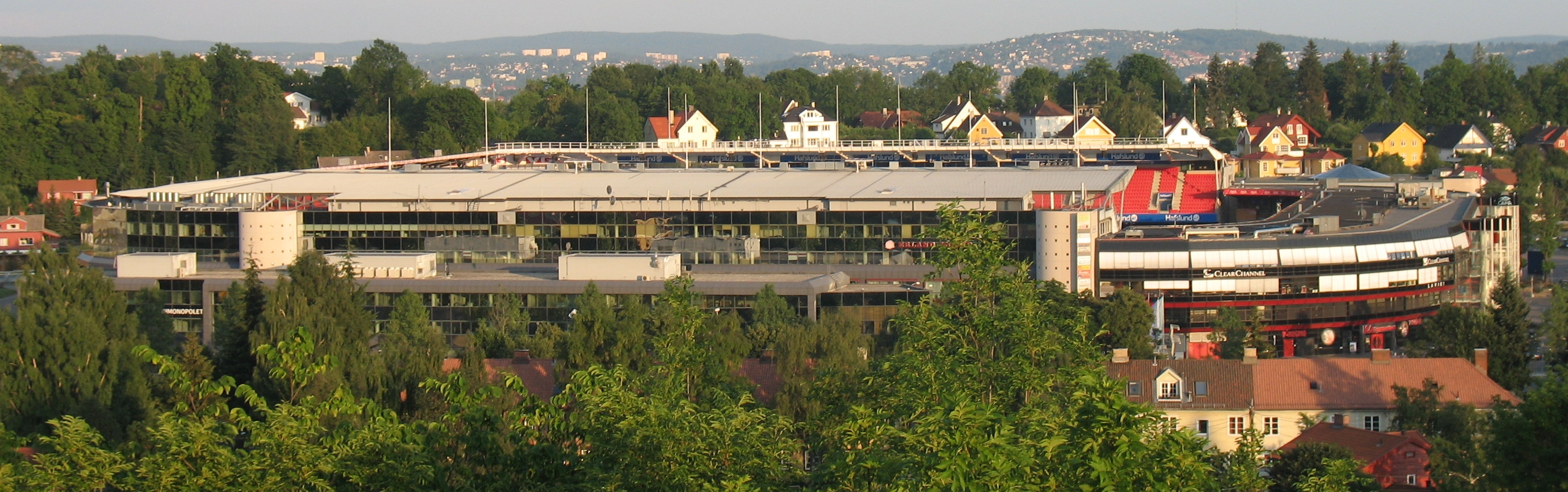
Ullevaal Stadion, Oslo - venue for the Norwegian Cup final

The 1993 Norwegian Football Cup was the 88th edition of the Norwegian Football Cup. The 1993 Norwegian Football Cup was won by Bodø/Glimt after they defeated Strømsgodset in the final on 24 October 1993.

Norwegian Cup Winners 1993: Bodø/Glimt
Rohnny Westad, Ola Haldorsen, Trond Sollied, Charles Berstad, Andreas Evjen, Runar Berg, Tom Kåre Staurvik, Tommy Hansen, Aasmund Bjørkan, Bent Inge Johnsen, Harald Martin Brattbakk, Tor Arne "Totte" Aga, Petter Solli, Thor Mikalsen, Ivar Morten Normark.

== Calendar ==
Below are the dates for each round as given by the official schedule:

Round	Date(s)	Number of fixtures	Clubs
First round	11–12 May 1993	64	128 → 64
Second round	25–27 May 1993	32	64 → 32
Third round	22–24 June 1993	16	32 → 16
Fourth round	21 July 1993	9	16 → 8
Quarter-finals	18 August 1993	4	8 → 4
Semi-finals	18–19 September 1993	2	4 → 2
Final	24 October 1993	1	2 → 1

== First round ==
Team 1	Score	Team 2
11 May 1993
Vedavåg	1–2	Haugar
Stord	1–5	Fana
Stabæk	2–0	Bærum
Volda	2–1 (a.e.t.)	Skarbøvik
Vålerenga	7–2	Galterud
Ørn-Horten	0–3	Strømsgodset
Norild	0–2	Honningsvåg
12 May 1993
Lyngbø	0–1	Os
Voss	0–1	Brann
Åndalsnes	3–1	Lom
Steinkjer	2–1	Nardo
Hana	2–2 (4–1 p)	Vidar
Djerv 1919	4–3	Åkra
Ålgård	0–4	Viking
Ulf-Sandnes	1–0	Figgjo
Kvinesdal	0–4	Start
Jerv	3–1	Vindbjart
Byåsen	5–0	Melhus
Clausenengen	1–6	Molde
Orkdal	3–0	Kolstad
Strindheim	7–0	Nessegutten
NTHI	0–2	Stjørdals/Blink
Eidsvold Turn	0–1	Elverum
Stålkameratene	3–4	Bodø/Glimt
Gevir Bodø	5–2	Sortland
Selbak	1–2	Sarpsborg FK
Drøbak/Frogn	3–1	Runar
Ørsta	0–5	Hødd
Averøykameratene	7–2	KIL/Hemne
Ramfjord	3–5	Lyngen/Karnes
Alta	0–7	Tromsø
Salangen	0–7	Mjølner
Grovfjord	4–2	Finnsnes
Frigg	2–0	Stovnerkameratene
Sandefjord BK	5–3 (a.e.t.)	Fredrikstad
Grue	0–3 (a.e.t.)	Kongsvinger
Aalesund	2–0	Kristiansund
Høland	3–1	Sprint-Jeløy
Pors	0–1	Øyestad
Eiger	1–4	Bryne
Kjelsås	5–2	Holmen
Liv/Fossekallen	1–0	Grei
Holmestrand	1–7	Eik-Tønsberg
Skjold	1–0	Vard Haugesund
Åsane	1–0	Bjørnar
Nybergsund	3–0	Raufoss
Lillehammer	0–3	HamKam
Åssiden	0–2	Fram Larvik
Solberg	0–1	Mjøndalen
Larvik Turn	1–6	Odd
Moss	3–0	Falk
Stryn	0–4	Sogndal
Ullern	3–1	Skeid
Sørumsand	2–1	Strømmen
Jevnaker	2–1	Lyn
Nest	0–2	Fyllingen
Løv-Ham	2–1	Vadmyra
Rælingen	1–4	Lørenskog
Ottestad	0–2	Lillestrøm
Råde	1–2	Torp
Ski	2–0	Kolbotn
Mosjøen	1–4	Namsos
Vuku	0–15	Rosenborg
Tromsdalen	5–1	Skarp

== Second round ==
Team 1	Score	Team 2
25 May 1993
Viking	2–1	Ulf-Sandnes
Haugar	1–3	Fana
Lørenskog	0–7	Lillestrøm
Namsos	1–4	Rosenborg
26 May 1993
Os	1–3	Brann
Åndalsnes	1–0	Steinkjer
Hana	1–0	Djerv 1919
Start	9–4	Jerv
Byåsen	0–3	Molde
Orkdal	0–2	Strindheim
Bodø/Glimt	8–0	Gevir Bodø
Sarpsborg FK	0–2	Drøbak/Frogn
Hødd	3–0	Averøykameratene
Lyngen/Karnes	0–3	Tromsø
Mjølner	5–2	Grovfjord
Frigg	2–3	Sandefjord BK
Kongsvinger	7–0	Stabæk
Volda	2–4	Aalesund
Høland	0–9	Vålerenga
Øyestad	1–1 (9–8 p)	Bryne
Liv/Fossekallen	2–3 (a.e.t.)	Eik-Tønsberg
Skjold	1–2	Åsane
Nybergsund	2–3 (a.e.t.)	HamKam
Fram Larvik	4–3 (a.e.t.)	Mjøndalen
Odd	5–3 (a.e.t.)	Moss
Sogndal	2–1	Ullern
Sørumsand	1–3	Jevnaker
Fyllingen	2–1	Løv-Ham
Torp	0–2	Ski
Honningsvåg	0–4	Tromsdalen
27 May 1993
Stjørdals/Blink	1–0	Elverum
Strømsgodset	5–0	Kjelsås

== Third round ==
Team 1	Score	Team 2
22 June 1993
Molde	1–0	Strindheim
Sandefjord BK	1–0	Kongsvinger
Aalesund	1–4	Vålerenga
Øyestad	0–5	Strømsgodset
Eik-Tønsberg	5–4	Åsane
23 June 1993
Brann	2–0	Åndalsnes
Hana	0–2	Viking
Stjørdals/Blink	1–2	Bodø/Glimt
Drøbak/Frogn	2–1	Hødd
Tromsø	5–1	Mjølner
HamKam	1–0	Fram Larvik
Odd	1–3	Sogndal
Jevnaker	2–4	Fyllingen
Lillestrøm	3–0	Ski
Rosenborg	6–0	Tromsdalen
24 June 1993
Fana	2–1 (a.e.t.)	Start

== Fourth round ==
21 July 1993

Viking	2–2 (a.e.t.)	Brann
Østenstad 89'; Hasund 120'		Nordeide 52'; Håberg 116'

Stavanger Stadion, Stavanger
Attendance: 9,544
Referee: Terje Singsaas

21 July 1993

Fana	0–6	Molde
		Hestad 29'; S. Rekdal 44'; Strande 50'; Rudi 62' (pen.); Neerland 63'; Ildhusøy 81'

Varden Amfi, Bergen
Attendance: 1,000
Referee: Per Arne Larsgård

21 July 1993

Bodø/Glimt	2–1	Drøbak/Frogn
Sollied 42'; Berg 76'		Amundsen 31'

Aspmyra Stadion, Bodø
Attendance: 3,702
Referee: Johnny Ditlefsen

21 July 1993

Tromsø	2–1 (a.e.t.)	Sandefjord BK
Rushfeldt 63'; Nilsen 95' (pen.)		Hem 75'

Alfheim Stadion, Tromsø
Attendance: 2,175
Referee: Frode Kvam

21 July 1993

Vålerenga	1–3	Strømsgodset
Solheim 38'		Bakke 22'; Kuvicek 73'; Johnsen 80'

Bislett Stadion, Oslo
Attendance: 3,078
Referee: Jon Skjervold

21 July 1993

Eik-Tønsberg	0–2	HamKam
		Sætre 12'; Hovi 60'

Tønsberg Gressbane, Tønsberg
Attendance: 2,950
Referee: Tore Aaland

21 July 1993

Sogndal	3–4 (a.e.t.)	Fyllingen
T. A. Flo 13'; Hillestad 89' (pen.); J. Flo 108'		Ludvigsen 14'; Sten 80', 116'; Farstad 95'

Fosshaugane, Sogndalsfjøra
Attendance: 2,503
Referee: Arild Haugstad

29 July 1993

Lillestrøm	3–1	Rosenborg
Mjelde 57', 72', 83'		Sørloth 56'

Åråsen Stadion, Lillestrøm
Attendance: 13,595
Referee: Tore Hollung

=== Replay ===
28 July 1993

Brann	1–0	Viking
Eskelinen 76'

Brann Stadion, Bergen
Attendance: 11,333
Referee: Rune Pedersen

== Quarter-finals ==
18 August 1993

Bodø/Glimt	3–0	Tromsø
Brattbakk 20'; Johnsen 44'; Staurvik 45'

Aspmyra Stadion, Bodø
Attendance: 5,665
Referee: Sven Kjelbrott

18 August 1993

Brann	2–0	Molde
A. Stavrum 25'; O. Stavrum 40'

Brann Stadion, Bergen
Attendance: 12,320
Referee: Arlid Thorp

18 August 1993

Strømsgodset	2–1	HamKam
Horsrud 10'; Gustavsen 86'		Solbakken 34'

Marienlyst Stadion, Drammen
Attendance: 6,440
Referee: Terje Hauge

25 August 1993

Fyllingen	1–0	Lillestrøm
Berntsen 86'

Varden Amfi, Bergen
Attendance: 2,172
Referee: Roy Helge Olsen

== Semi-finals ==
18 September 1993

Brann	2–4	Bodø/Glimt
A. Stavrum 31'; Johnsen 34' (o.g.)		Bjørkan 3', 89'; Brattbakk 26'; Berg 90'

Brann Stadion, Bergen
Attendance: 13,013
Referee: Einar Halle

19 September 1993

Strømsgodset	2–1	Fyllingen
Isaksen 12'; Strøm 89'		Bergset 25'

Marienlyst Stadion, Drammen
Attendance: 9,777
Referee: Rune Pedersen

== Final ==
24 October 1993
13:15 CET (UTC+1)

Bodø/Glimt	2–0	Strømsgodset
Johnsen 65'; Staurvik 82'	Report

Ullevaal Stadion, Oslo
Attendance: 26,315
Referee: Sven Kjellbrott (Haugerud)
