= 1993 Norwegian Football Cup final =

- Event: 1993 Norwegian Football Cup
Bodø/Glimt	Strømsgodset
2	0
- Date: 24 October 1993
- Venue: Ullevaal Stadion, Oslo
- Referee: Sven Kjellbrott
- Attendance: 26,315

The 1993 Norwegian Football Cup final was the final match of the 1993 Norwegian Football Cup, the 88th season of the Norwegian Football Cup, the premier Norwegian football cup competition organized by the Football Association of Norway (NFF). The match was played on 24 October 1993 at the Ullevaal Stadion in Oslo, and was contested between the Tippeligaen side Bodø/Glimt and the First Division side Strømsgodset. Bodø/Glimt defeated Strømsgodset 2–0 to claim the Norwegian Cup for a second time in their history.

== Route to the final ==
Bodø/Glimt			Round	Strømsgodset		
Stålkameratene	A	4–3	Round 1	Ørn-Horten	A	3–0
Gevir Bodø	H	8–0	Round 2	Kjelsås	H	5–0
Stjørdals/Blink	A	2–1	Round 3	Øyestad	A	5–0
Drøbak/Frogn	H	2–1	Round 4	Vålerenga	A	3–1
Tromsø	H	3–0	Quarterfinal	HamKam	H	2–1
Brann	A	4–2	Semifinal	Fyllingen	H	2–1

== Match ==
=== Details ===
24 October 1993
13:15 CET (UTC+1)

Bodø/Glimt	2–0	Strømsgodset
Johnsen 65'; Staurvik 82'	Report

Ullevaal Stadion, Oslo
Attendance: 26,315
Referee: Sven Kjellbrott (Haugerud)

Bodø/Glimt	Strømsgodset

Bodø/Glimt:
GK	(Norway) Rohnny Westad	(substituted off) 86'
DF	(Norway) Ola Haldorsen
DF	(Norway) Trond Sollied
DF	(Norway) Charles Berstad
DF	(Norway) Andreas Evjen
MF	(Norway) Runar Berg
MF	(Norway) Tom Kåre Staurvik
MF	(Norway) Tommy Hansen
FW	(Norway) Aasmund Bjørkan	(substituted off) 73'
FW	(Norway) Bent Inge Johnsen
FW	(Norway) Harald Martin Brattbakk
Substitutions:
GK	(Norway) Tor-Arne Aga	(substituted in) 86'
DF	(Norway) Thor Mikalsen	(substituted in) 73'
DF	(Norway) Petter Solli
FW	(Norway) Ivar Morten Normark
Coach:
(Norway) Trond Sollied

Strømsgodset:
GK	(Norway) Thomas Ødegaard
DF	(Norway) Espen Horsrud
DF	(Norway) Frode Johannessen
DF	(Norway) Vegard Hansen	Booked
DF	(Norway) Ståle Skau
MF	(Norway) Geir Andersen
MF	(Norway) Odd Johnsen
MF	(Norway) Krister Isaksen	(substituted off) 78'
MF	(Norway) Ruben Bakke
MF	(Norway) Lars Kåre Gustavsen	(substituted off) 74'
FW	(Norway) Juro Kuvicek
Substitutions:
MF	(Norway) Ståle Brandsrud	(substituted in) 78'
MF	(Norway) Hans Erik Ødegaard	(substituted in) 74'
Coach:
(Norway) Dag Vidar Kristoffersen
