= 1992 Norwegian Football Cup =

Norgesmesterskapet i fotball for herrer

Tournament details
- Country: Norway
- Teams: 128 (main competition)

Final positions
- Champions: Rosenborg (6th title)
- Runners-up: Lillestrøm

Tournament statistics
- Top goal scorer: Mons Ivar Mjelde (6)

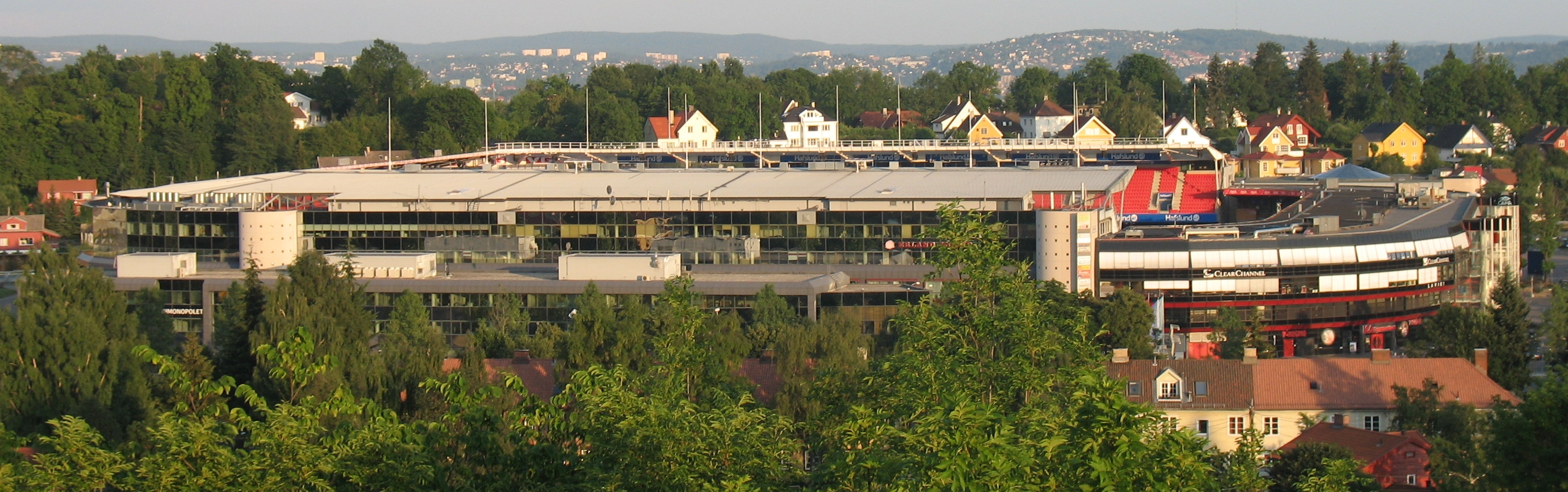
Ullevaal Stadion, Oslo - venue for the Norwegian Cup final

The 1992 Norwegian Football Cup was the 87th edition of the Norwegian Football Cup. The 1992 Norwegian Football Cup was won by Rosenborg after they defeated Lillestrøm in the final on 25 October 1992.

== Calendar ==
Below are the dates for each round as given by the official schedule:

Round	Date(s)	Number of fixtures	Clubs
First round	26–28 May 1992	64	128 → 64
Second round	10–11 June 1992	32	64 → 32
Third round	24–25 June 1992	16	32 → 16
Fourth round	22 July 1992	9	16 → 8
Quarter-finals	12 August 1992	4	8 → 4
Semi-finals	5–6 September 1992	2	4 → 2
Final	25 October 1992	1	2 → 1

== First round ==
Team 1	Score	Team 2
26 May 1992
Østsiden	1–1 (6–7 p)	Råde
27 May 1992
Averøykameratene	0–5	Molde
Fjøra	1–3	Sogndal
Flekkefjord	0–1	Start
Fossum	0–5	Stabæk
Galterud	2–4	Kongsvinger
Honningsvåg	3–4	Lakselv
Klepp	0–3	Viking
Melhus	3–1 (a.e.t.)	Verdal
Namsos	4–3 (a.e.t.)	Nessegutten
Nybergsund	1–0	Elverum
Orkanger	0–5	Rosenborg
Runar	1–3	Gulset
Skarp	2–5	Lyngen/Karnes
Skeid	1–2	Ski
Sortland	1–0	Narvik/Nor
Stjørdals-Blink	5–1	Sparbu
Teie	0–2	Sandefjord BK
Tune	0–1	Fredrikstad
28 May 1992
Alta	0–2	Tromsdalen
Åndalsnes	3–2	Surnadal
Asker	3–0	Frigg
Åssiden	0–2	Strømsgodset
Bodø/Glimt	7–0	Gevir/Vinkelen
Donn	0–2	Øyestad
Eik-Tønsberg	4–1	Tollnes
Falk	1–2	Mjøndalen
Figgjo	1–3	Bryne
Finnsnes	0–2	Tromsø
Florvåg	3–2	Åsane
Gjøvik–Lyn	1–6	HamKam
Grei	4–0	Lørenskog
Hareid	2–0	Valder
Harstad	0–1 (a.e.t.)	Grovfjord
Høland	1–6	Lillestrøm
Jerv	0–1	Pors
Jevnaker	1–4	Faaberg
Kjelsås	2–0	Liv/Fossekallen
Kristiansund	7–2	Brattvåg
Lom	2–1	Alvdal
Mjølner	12–2	Saltdalkameratene
Moss	7–1	Sarpsborg FK
Nordre Land	1–3	Vålerenga
Nordstrand	2–4	Lyn
Odd	3–1	Fram Larvik
Os	5–0	Løv-Ham
Rakkestad	3–2	Drøbak/Frogn
Skarbøvik	0–1	Aalesund
Skjold	3–1	Djerv 1919
Steinkjer	1–2	Stålkameratene
Stord	3–2	Follese
Stryn	0–1	Stranda
Strømmen	2–1	Eidsvold Turn
Sørumsand	2–0	Holter
Telavåg	0–6	Fana
Ulf-Sandnes	6–0	Madla
Ullern	1–2	Bærum
Vard Haugesund	1–0	Ålgård
Volda	1–3	Hødd
11 June 1992
Lyngbø	1–3	Brann
14 June 1992
Vidar	3–1	Haugar
17 June 1992
Fyllingen	5–1	Vadmyra
Nardo	2–0	Ranheim
Strindheim	2–1	Byåsen

== Second round ==
Team 1	Score	Team 2
10 June 1992
Kristiansund	2–0	Hareid
Lom	2–5	Sogndal
Mjølner	5–2	Sortland
Namsos	1–5	Stjørdals-Blink
Odd	7–0	Gulset
Ski	0–1	Strømmen
Stabæk	1–3	Strømsgodset
Stranda	1–5	Molde
Stålkameratene	0–8	Rosenborg
11 June 1992
Aalesund	1–3	Melhus
Bryne	3–1	Ulf-Sandnes
Bærum	0–1	Nybergsund
Fredrikstad	3–1	Råde
Faaberg	0–2	HamKam
Grei	0–1	Vålerenga
Grovfjord	0–1	Bodø/Glimt
Hødd	4–0	Åndalsnes
Kongsvinger	7–0	Kjelsås
Lillestrøm	1–0	Sørumsand
Lakselv	2–8	Tromsø
Lyn	9–1	Asker
Lyngen/Karnes	0–1	Tromsdalen
Øyestad	0–6	Start
Pors	2–7	Mjøndalen
Rakkestad	0–6	Moss
Sandefjord BK	0–1	Eik-Tønsberg
Skjold	0–4	Fana
Stord	1–1 (1–4 p)	Os
16 June 1992
Vard Haugesund	0–4	Viking
17 June 1992
Vidar	1–3 (a.e.t.)	Brann
23 June 1992
Florvåg	1–5	Fyllingen
Strindheim	1–1 (2–4 p)	Nardo

== Third round ==
Team 1	Score	Team 2
24 June 1992
Bodø/Glimt	4–1	Mjølner
HamKam	2–3	Fredrikstad
Mjøndalen	4–1	Eik-Tønsberg
Molde	1–2	Melhus
Moss	0–0 (3–5 p)	Lyn
Nybergsund	0–3	Lillestrøm
Rosenborg	5–1	Kristiansund
Start	1–1 (4–3 p)	Odd
Strømmen	0–0 (1–3 p)	Kongsvinger
Strømsgodset	2–0	Bryne
Tromsø	1–1 (5–4 p)	Tromsdalen
Vålerenga	1–1 (4–2 p)	Hødd
Viking	1–0	Os
25 June 1992
Fana	1–0	Brann
Sogndal	3–4 (a.e.t.)	Fyllingen
Stjørdals-Blink	4–2	Nardo

== Fourth round ==
21 July 1992

Lillestrøm	3–2	Lyn
Berg 8'; Osvold 29'; Schiller 82'		Bergersen 45', 85'

Åråsen Stadion, Lillestrøm
Attendance: 5,721
Referee: Rune Pedersen

22 July 1992

Fredrikstad	0–4	Strømsgodset
		Johnsen 5'; Johannesen 30'; Knutsen 44'; Kuvicek 61'

Fredrikstad Stadion, Fredrikstad
Attendance: 2,209
Referee: Arild Haugstad

22 July 1992

Fyllingen	2–2 (a.e.t.)	Tromsø
Ludvigsen 29'; Knudsen 36'		Espejord 15'; T. Johansen 45'

Varden Amfi, Bergen
Attendance: 1,724
Referee: Einar Halle

22 July 1992

Kongsvinger	5–2	Fana
Francis 1'; Kaasa 34'; Riisnæs 62'; Bergman 85'; Sunde 90'		Jensen 58'; Nilsen 70'

Gjemselund Stadion, Kongsvinger
Attendance: 2,103
Referee: Roy Helge Olsen

22 July 1992

Melhus	1–2	Bodø/Glimt
Olsen 90'		Staurvik 47' (pen.); Brattbakk 52'

Gruva Stadion, Melhus
Attendance: 2,500
Referee: Frode Kvam

22 July 1992

Mjøndalen	1–0	Stjørdals-Blink
Engan 62'

Nedre Eiker Stadion, Mjøndalen
Attendance: 1,513
Referee: Tom Henning Øvrebø

22 July 1992

Start	0–1 (a.e.t.)	Rosenborg
		Dahlum 120'

Kristiansand Stadion, Kristiansand
Attendance: 12,104
Referee: Tore Hollung

22 July 1992

Vålerenga	1–3	Viking
Solheim 86'		Tveit 15'; Meinseth 35'; Gjerde 68'

Bislett Stadion, Oslo
Attendance: 2,570
Referee: Håkon Bondal

=== Replay ===
29 July 1992

Tromsø	2–1	Fyllingen
Espejord 22'; T. H. Pedersen 30'		Knudsen 19' (pen.)

Alfheim Stadion, Tromsø
Attendance: 2,501
Referee: Egil Nervik

== Quarter-finals ==
12 August 1992

Kongsvinger	4–2	Bodø/Glimt
Kaasa 58', 90'; Bergmann 66'; Sanderud 73' (pen.)		Sollied 35'; Staurvik 82'

Gjemselund Stadion, Kongsvinger
Attendance: 4,372
Referee: Svein Kjellbrott

12 August 1992

Rosenborg	7–0	Strømsgodset
Sørloth 33'; Henriksen 38'; Tangen 45' (pen.); Ingebrigtsen 56', 75'; Strand 68'; By Rise 80' (pen.)

Lerkendal Stadion, Trondheim
Attendance: 14,790
Referee: Svein G. Hermansen

12 August 1992

Tromsø	1–2	Lillestrøm
S. Nilsen 78'		Mjelde 18'; Nysæther 25'

Alfheim Stadion, Tromsø
Attendance: 3,987
Referee: Terje Hauge

12 August 1992

Viking	2–0	Mjøndalen
I. Bøe 76' (pen.); Fjetland 77'

Stavanger Stadion, Stavanger
Attendance: 5,431
Referee: Arild Thorp

== Semi-finals ==
5 September 1992

Lillestrøm	1–0	Kongsvinger
Gulbrandsen 87'

Åråsen Stadion, Lillestrøm
Attendance: 6,200
Referee: Roy Helge Olsen

6 September 1992

Rosenborg	2–1 (a.e.t.)	Viking
Sørloth 15'; Strand 116'		Solberg 68'

Lerkendal Stadion, Trondheim
Attendance: 18,909
Referee: Kjell Nordby

== Final ==
25 October 1992
13:15 CET (UTC+1)

Rosenborg	3–2	Lillestrøm
Dahlum 29'; Sørloth 50'; Bjørnebye 90'	Report	Mjelde 31', 60'

Ullevaal Stadion, Oslo
Attendance: 28,217
Referee: Rune Pedersen (Sprint/Jeløy)
