= 1987 Norwegian Football Cup =

Norgesmesterskapet i fotball for herrer

Tournament details
- Country: Norway
- Teams: 128 (main competition)

Final positions
- Champions: Bryne (1st title)
- Runners-up: Brann

The 1987 Norwegian Football Cup was the 82nd edition of the Norwegian annual knockout football tournament. The Cup was won by Bryne after they beat Brann in the cup final with the score 1–0. This was Bryne's first Norwegian Cup title.

From this season, the penalty shoot-outs were replaced the replays in the first three rounds.

== First round ==
Team 1	Score	Team 2
30 May 1987
Andenes	3–1	Svolvær
Asker	0–2	Kolbotn
Aurskog/Finstadbru	0–5	Lillestrøm
Brattvåg	1–2	Aalesund
Bækkelaget	1–2	Råde
Bærum	2–0	Strømsgodset
Donn	3–2	Kvinesdal
Eidsvold Turn	0–1	Bjørkelangen
Fauske/Sprint	1–0	Mjølner
Figgjo	2–1 (a.e.t.)	Staal
Fram Larvik	0–1	Odd
Fyllingen	1–0	Os
Geilo	0–7	Mjøndalen
Grei	1–5	Frigg
Grovfjord	0–1	Grand Bodø
Gulset	0–2	Tjølling
Hareid	1–1 (3–4 p)	Hødd
Haugar	0–4	Bryne
Hof (Solør)	1–7	HamKam
Kapp	2–1	Lyn
Kautokeino	4–3	Skjervøy
Kjelsås	3–1	Gjerdrum
Klepp	0–2	Vidar
Kongsvinger	8–1	Fremad
Kristiansund	1–3 (a.e.t.)	Molde
Kvik Halden	0–2 (a.e.t.)	Moss
Langevåg	4–0	Skarbøvik
Lisleby	1–3 (a.e.t.)	Fredrikstad
Lyngen	0–7	Tromsø
Malvik	0–2	Freidig
Namsos	2–1	Nidelv/Falken
Nessegutten	0–2	Rosenborg
Nybergsund	2–1	Elverum
Ny-Krohnborg	1–2	Stord
Oppdal	1–1 (5–4 p)	Alvdal
Radøy	0–3	Varegg
Randaberg	2–0	Viking
Ranheim	2–3	Strindheim
Raufoss	2–0	Gjøvik SK
Redalen	0–3 (a.e.t.)	Faaberg
Sandefjord BK	2–2 (9–8 p)	Eik-Tønsberg
Sarpsborg	4–0	Slemmestad
Skjold	0–4	Djerv 1919
Sogndal	5–1	Stryn
Spjelkavik	1–3 (a.e.t.)	Clausenengen
Sprint/Jeløy	1–1 (2–4 p)	Ørn-Horten
Steinkjer	2–1	Ekne
Strømmen	5–0	Drafn
Sunndal	5–1	Bud
Surnadal	4–4 (4–5 p)	Orkanger
Teie	0–2	Drøbak/Frogn
Ull/Kisa	0–1	Vålerengen
Øksfjord	0–5	Skarp
Ålgård	2–0	Vard Haugesund
Åssiden	1–0 (a.e.t.)	Skeid
31 May 1987
Charlottenlund	5–1	Verdal
Eid	3–1	Førde
Fana	0–1	Brann
Florvåg	1–2	Åsane
Grane (Arendal)	1–2	Pors
Saltdalkameratene	3–5	Bodø/Glimt
Sandnessjøen	0–1	Mo
Vigør	0–3	Start
1 June 1987
Drangedal	1–4 (a.e.t.)	Jerv

== Second round ==
Team 1	Score	Team 2
23 June 1987
Bryne	2–0	Ålgård
Mjøndalen	12–0	Tjølling
24 June 1987
Bjørkelangen	0–2	Strømmen
Brann	4–0	Fyllingen
Charlottenlund	1–2	Namsos
Clausenengen	0–1	Sunndal
Djerv 1919	2–0	Figgjo
Drøbak/Frogn	2–2 (7–6 p)	Åssiden
Faaberg	2–3	Kapp
HamKam	3–1	Nybergsund
Jerv	1–5	Odd
Kolbotn	1–2 (a.e.t.)	Raufoss
Kongsvinger	3–0	Bærum
Lillestrøm	6–3 (a.e.t.)	Sandefjord BK
Mo	1–6 (a.e.t.)	Bodø/Glimt
Molde	11–0	Langevåg
Moss	4–0	Sarpsborg
Orkanger	1–3	Strindheim
Pors	1–0	Start
Rosenborg	4–0	Oppdal
Råde	3–2 (a.e.t.)	Frigg
Sogndal	2–0	Eid
Steinkjer	4–0	Freidig
Stord	0–1	Åsane
Tromsø	5–0	Kautokeino
Varegg	1–2 (a.e.t.)	Randaberg
Vidar	4–2 (a.e.t.)	Donn
Vålerengen	0–2	Kjelsås
Ørn-Horten	1–2 (a.e.t.)	Fredrikstad
Aalesund	4–1	Hødd
25 June 1987
Grand Bodø	1–0	Andenes
Skarp	1–1 (4–3 p)	Fauske/Sprint

== Third round ==
Team 1	Score	Team 2
7 July 1987
Strømmen	1–1 (4–2 p)	Pors
Kapp	0–1 (a.e.t.)	HamKam
Fredrikstad	2–1	Kongsvinger
Djerv 1919	0–2	Bryne
8 July 1987
Kjelsås	2–1	Drøbak/Frogn
Raufoss	0–4	Lillestrøm
Moss	0–0 (4–5 p)	Råde
Sunndal	2–0	Molde
Randaberg	0–1	Brann
Strindheim	4–1	Steinkjer
Åsane	0–2	Vidar
Bodø/Glimt	3–1	Skarp
Tromsø	2–0	Grand
Namsos	0–3	Rosenborg
Odd	0–1	Mjøndalen
Aalesund	2–0	Sogndal

== Fourth round ==
2 August 1987

Sunndal	0–1	Strømmen
		Kallstad 29'

Sande Stadion, Sunndalsøra
Attendance: 1,870
Referee: Rolf Haugen

2 August 1987

Brann	2–1 (a.e.t.)	Strindheim
Storskogen 10', 104'		Stokke 1'

Brann Stadion, Bergen
Attendance: 5,576
Referee: Einar Halle

2 August 1987

Vidar	0–1 (a.e.t.)	HamKam
		Skogheim 120'

Stavanger Stadion, Stavanger
Attendance: 5,576
Referee: Torodd Pressberg

2 August 1987

Bodø/Glimt	5–3	Kjelsås
Berg 49'; Haldorsen 50', 81'; Hansen 56'; Solli 69'		Pettersen 57', 70'; Rønning 83' (pen.)

Aspmyra Stadion, Bodø
Attendance: 3,025
Referee: Torbjørn Aass

2 August 1987

Lillestrøm	0–1	Tromsø
		Espejord 53'

Åråsen Stadion, Lillestrøm
Attendance: 5,759
Referee: Per Arne Larsgård

2 August 1987

Rosenborg	7–0	Råde
Sørloth 10', 87'; Nieuwlaat 17'; Hansen 33'; Wiggen 44'; Henriksen 66'; Eggen 73'

Lerkendal Stadion, Trondheim
Attendance: 4,162
Referee: Rolf Madsen

2 August 1987

Mjøndalen	2–2 (a.e.t.)	Bryne
Andersen 48'; Joelsen 78'		Ekker 19'; Fosse 31'

Nedre Eiker Stadion, Mjøndalen
Attendance: 3,611
Referee: Tore Hollung

2 August 1987

Fredrikstad	1–2	Aalesund
Thomassen 33' (pen.)		Ytterland 8'; Halkjelsvik 77'

Fredrikstad Stadion, Fredrikstad
Attendance: 2,166
Referee: Harald Hansen

=== Replay ===
5 August 1987

Bryne	5–2	Mjøndalen
Folkvord 20', 63'; Lodden 39'; Pedersen 80'; Meinseth 87' (pen.)		Ørbeck 48'; Nilsen 59'

Bryne Stadion, Bryne
Attendance: 4,120
Referee: Roy Helge Olsen

== Quarter-finals ==
19 August 1987

Strømmen	0–1 (a.e.t.)	Brann
		Wilborn 117'

Strømmen Stadion, Strømmen
Attendance: 5,112
Referee: Bjørn Kronborg

19 August 1987

HamKam	5–2	Bodø/Glimt
Fjørtoft 42'; Skogheim 45', 74'; Kollshaugen 48'; Kristiansen 70'		Hansen 12'; Jakobsen 32'

Briskeby gressbane, Hamar
Attendance: 5,428
Referee: Lars Kåre Rogne

19 August 1987

Tromsø	0–0 (a.e.t.)	Rosenborg

Alfheim Stadion, Tromsø
Attendance: 9,246
Referee: Kjell Nordby

19 August 1987

Bryne	3–0	Aalesund
Ekker 16'; Folkvord 58'; Meinseth 77' (pen.)

Bryne Stadion, Bryne
Attendance: 4,102
Referee: Arild Haugstad

=== Replay ===
1 September 1987

Rosenborg	0–0 (a.e.t.)	Tromsø

Lerkendal Stadion, Trondheim
Attendance: 15,193
Referee: Erling Haugen

=== Second replay ===
3 September 1987

Tromsø	2–4	Rosenborg
Rismo 39'; Jenssen 71'		Henriksen 23'; Brandhaug 58'; Nieuwlaat 69'; Lilleberg 84'

Ullevaal Stadion, Oslo
Attendance: 5,803
Referee: Per Arne Larsgård

== Semi-finals ==
19 September 1987

Brann	2–1	HamKam
Johnsen 14'; Wilborn 57'		Kollshaugen 28'

Brann Stadion, Bergen
Attendance: 9,043
Referee: Egil Nervik

20 September 1987

Rosenborg	2–3	Bryne
Nieuwlaat 11'; Brandhaug 33'		Madsen 46', 81'; Meinseth 55'

Lerkendal Stadion, Trondheim
Attendance: 17,081
Referee: Einar Halle

== Final ==
25 October 1987
13:15 CEST (UTC+2)

Bryne	1–0 (a.e.t.)	Brann
Ekker 102'	Report

Ullevaal Stadion, Oslo
Attendance: 23,080
Referee: Kjell Nordby (Rygge)
