= Krister Isaksen =

Norwegian footballer (born 1970)

Personal information
- Full name: Krister Are Isaksen
- Date of birth: 15 May 1970 (age 56)
- Position: Forward

Youth career
- Skrim
- 1984–1988: Start

Senior career*
Years	Team	Apps	(Gls)
1988–1990	Start	23	(2)
1991–1996	Strømsgodset		
1997–1999	Start	45	(17)
2000	Grim		
2002–2004	Våg		

International career
1985	Norway U15	7	(3)
1986	Norway U16	3	(0)
1988	Norway U18	2	(1)
1987	Norway U19	7	(3)
1989	Norway U20	4	(0)
- * Club domestic league appearances and goals

Krister Are Isaksen (born 15 April 1970) is a retired Norwegian football striker. Growing up in three different cities, he joined IK Start as a youth player and represented Norwegian youth national teams throughout the 1980s. During his elite career from 1989 to 1999 he represented Start and Strømsgodset, being best known for saving the latter club from relegation the last minutes of the 1996 Eliteserien.

== Early life and career ==
Isaksen grew up at Hesseng in Sør-Varanger before his family moved to Kongsberg while he was still a child. He played youth football for Skrim. His stepfather serving in the military, the family uprooted again in 1984, this time to Kristiansand. Isaksen subsequently joined the youth system of IK Start.

Isaksen was a prolific youth international for Norway. He made his debut in 1985, winning a Nordic Championship. In that tournament, Dagbladet praised Isaksen as man of the match against guest competitor England U15. He was then a squad member of the 1986 UEFA European Under-16 Championship in Greece and the 1988 UEFA European Under-18 Championship. In the latter tournament, Norway qualified for the 1989 FIFA World Youth Championship, where Isaksen again participated.

He scored his first senior goals for Start in June 1988, with two goals in a cup thrashing of Gulset. His first league goal came in May 1989 against Molde. In 1990, he scored a cup hattrick against Jerv.

== Strømsgodset ==
Isaksen broke his leg in 1991 and did not return until the fall of 1992, missing the 1991 Norwegian Football Cup final.

He was not a regular at the start of the 1993 season, but played well during the cup and for Strømsgodset's B team. For the latter, he scored 8 goals in one match. In the 1993 Norwegian Football Cup, Isaksen scored the first goal in Strømsgodset's semi-final against Fyllingen, which they eventually won 2–1 after Vegard Strøm's late goal. Isaksen played the 1993 Norwegian Football Cup final, which Strømsgodset lost to Bodø/Glimt.

In 1994, Strømsgodset had an abysmal season, being relegated from 1994 Eliteserien with Isaksen only scoring twice. He was approached by neighboring team Mjøndalen, but chose to commence his fifth Strømsgodset season.

As Strømsgodset finished second in the 1995 1. divisjon, Group 2, the team reached a promotion playoff against Sogndal. Krister Isaksen became the central player. In the first leg, he scored twice in Strømsgodset's 3–1 victory, but also received a red card. He was a nervous onlooker in the second leg, but Strømsgodset held Sogndal to 0–0 and were promoted to the 1996 Eliteserien. Strømsgodset waited to renew Isaksen's outgoing contract, looking for a possibility to sign someone else, but Isaksen could finally put pen to paper in December 1995.

=== Playing style ===
Isaksen was known for a fierce and temperamental playing style, which led him to be a powerful duel player, but also pick up a lot of yellow cards. He was called a "hothead" and nicknamed "Tigergutt", the Norwegian name of Tigger. Another nickname that stuck while he played for Strømsgodset was "Bikkja" ("the mutt").

In 1997, Isaksen vowed to pay each of his teammates 100 kr for every time he was booked. As the season concluded, Isaksen had collected 9 yellow cards, the highest number of any player in the two highest leagues for men.

In 1998, Isaksen was reported by Lyn for verbal abuse towards their player Hassan El Fakiri at the La Manga friendly tournament. Isaksen admitted to using the word "pakkis" ("Paki") towards the Moroccan-born El Fakiri. Said Isaksen; "Of 1000 stupid words, 'pakkis' was the stupidest I could have chosen". For his transgression he was issued a two-match ban.

=== Start v Strømsgodset 2–6 ===
In the last round of 1996 Eliteserien, Strømsgodset faced Isaksen's former club Start away. Ahead of the match, Strømsgodset found themselves in the relegation spot. Above them were Moss and Vålerenga. At the same time as neither of these teams could win, Strømsgodset had to beat Start who languished in the bottom spot. In addition, Strømsgodset would have to overcome a goal difference that was four goals weaker than that of Moss.

At half time, Strømsgodset led by one goal, incidentally scored by Isaksen to put the score at 2–1. Moss and Vålerenga were both in the lead, however, thwarting Strømsgodset's chances to bypass them in the table. In the second half, Vålerenga proceeded to lose their game whereas Moss was held to a draw.

When Isaksen scored in the 75th minute, he put Strømsgodset ahead 5 to 2. Winning by three goals still was not enough to avoid relegation. Two minutes into stoppage time, Isaksen sent the ball past Frode Olsen to increase the lead to 6–2. Strømsgodset's goal difference was now equal to that of Moss, moving ahead in the table due to having scored more goals.

Isaksen had also missed a major goalscoring opportunity before scoring his last goal. Isaksen also had a goal disallowed in the penultimate match against Moss (with Strømsgodset having two additional disallowed goals in the same match), which he vividly claimed to have been legal. National newspapers described the difference between 5–2 and 6–2 as "going from hell to heaven in three minutes". In the Drammen press, the performance was dubbed "football bombshell of the century" and "miracle". Strømsgodset's avoidance of relegation was worth several million kr.

== Return to Kristiansand ==
Ahead of the 1997 season, Isaksen had concrete offers from Strømsgodset, Start, Hødd and Aalesund, should he choose to move to Sunnmøre where his wife was from. Ultimately, he chose Start, where he described the "total package" as the superior offer. Though Start was now relegated, Isaksen would play an important role in their attempt at re-promotion, and would also be close to family in Kristiansand. The transfer fee was set to 240,000 kr. Isaksen also tried to activate a clause in one of his former contracts, which stated that he was personally entitled to 15% of the transfer fee received by Strømsgodset.

With 9 goals in the 1997 1. divisjon and 8 goals in the 1998 1. divisjon, Isaksen became Start's top goalscorer two consecutive seasons.

Isaksen's career came to a halt in 1999. After the 1998 season, Isaksen was not willing to accept a pay cut, and Start wanted to terminate his contract. An attempt to find another club in Norway or England, aided by the Norwegian Players' Association, was fruitless. At the same time, labour laws made a contract termination impossible. Despite an offer from Aalesunds FK, Isaksen remained in Start, ultimately accepting the purported pay cut.

It soon became apparent that Isaksen was not a starting choice for the new Start manager Jan Halvor Halvorsen, who brought striker Trond Nordseth along from his previous club. Isaksen rarely played during the pre-season friendlies. After playing four games in May, it became clear that Isaksen would lose most of the remaining season. Complications from the broken leg surgery in 1991 had become painful. The public hospitals had long queues for surgery, and Start could not afford a private hospital. As Start were promoted to the 2000 Eliteserien, they had no intentions of retaining Isaksen.

After the 1999 season, Isaksen retired from professional fotball. He first joined the seventh-tier club FK Grim together with another former Start player Tore Løvland to play football as a hobby. The team trained once a week and had no coach. Isaksen later moved a bit further up the divisions to FK Våg. He retired ahead of the 2004 season.

== Personal life ==
Isaksen had a daughter who lived in Kristiansand while he was playing for Strømsgodset. He later married Grete Grimstad. They had a son together.

He settled in Tveit in Kristiansand. Here, he worked as a sales director in a power company and coached the youth team of his son. Hunting was his main hobby.
