= Tommy Hansen (footballer, born 1967) =

Norwegian footballer

Personal information
- Date of birth: 13 February 1967 (age 59)
- Place of birth: Bodø, Norway
- Position: Midfielder

Senior career*
Years	Team	Apps	(Gls)
1986	Grand Bodø		
1987–1989	Bodø/Glimt		
1990–1991	Mjøndalen		
1992–1997	Bodø/Glimt		
1998–1999	Gevir Bodø		

Managerial career
- 1998–1999: Gevir Bodø (player-manager)
- * Club domestic league appearances and goals

Tommy Hansen (born 13 February 1967) is a retired Norwegian football midfielder. He spent most of his career in Bodø, representing FK Bodø/Glimt as well as two lesser teams in the city, except for two seasons in Mjøndalen IF. His main honour with Bodø/Glimt was the victory in the 1993 Norwegian Football Cup Final.

== Early career ==
He started his youth and senior career in IK Grand Bodø, playing on the second tier. He was converted from midfielder to forward, but despite 7 league goals in 1986, the team was relegated Hansen therefore moved on to FK Bodø/Glimt in 1987, turning down an offer from Fauske/Sprint.

Hansen had a slow start to the 1987 season because he carried out the compulsory military service. Nordlands Framtid also referred doubts as to his diet. Hansen gradually found his form, playing in attack alongside Mini Jakobsen and Petter Solli.

== Elite career ==
In 1990 Hansen was pursued to move south and join Mjøndalen IF, a promotion contender in the 1990 Norwegian Second Division. The transfer fee was 90,000 kr. In the 1990 season he was slightly maladjusted, but found his form in 1991. By 1991 he had been converted to attacking midfielder. He showcased playmaker qualities, ranking higher in assists than in goals. With Mjøndalen reaching the semi-final of the 1991 Norwegian Football Cup, Hansen scored once and recorded the assist to the goal that put them through to the quarter-final, as well as scoring in the quarter-final.

After the 1991 season Hansen moved back north to rejoin Bodø/Glimt, despite Mjøndalen winning promotion from the 1991 Norwegian First Division. According to the previous transfer deal between Bodø/Glimt and Mjøndalen, the Bodø club was entitled to purchase Hansen back for a discounted price. Mjøndalen would rather have retained Hansen, or sold him to a third party without the discount. The transfer fee was reported as 60,000 kr. Bodø/Glimt won promotion from the 1992 Norwegian First Division, which was Hansen's second in a row. Hansen lost most of the season due to back pains, and increased his dorsal workouts.

The 1993 pre-season looked promising, with Hansen among others scoring twice against Paralimni in a pre-season camp. Bodø/Glimt emerged as a contender to win the 1993 Eliteserien, finishing as runners-up, and progressed steadily in the 1993 Norwegian Football Cup. As Bodø/Glimt progressed to their first cup semi-final since 1977, beating North Norwegian rivals Tromsø in the quarter-final, Hansen was designated man of the match. According to local press, Hansen had become a fan favourite (attendants' hero in local parlance). Hansen played the whole 1993 Norwegian Football Cup final which Bodø/Glimt won.

As Bodø/Glimt subsequently entered the 1994-95 UEFA Cup Winners' Cup, Hansen played as a substitute during their long-remembered 3–2 victory against Sampdoria at home. Hansen played well during the spring of 1995, before being injured against Kongsvinger on 30 July. His leg was in a cast for several weeks. Returning in a friendly match on 3 February 1996, his start to the 1996 Eliteserien season was met with "harsh criticism" from the Aspmyra audience as well as low grades in the local press (which graded players after every game). Hansen vowed that he and the team would find the "rhythm", and explained his increased amount of failed plays with "playing on small margins".

In 1997, Hansen was omitted from the squad that travelled to Cyprus for a pre-season training camp. By July, he had still not featured in any league matches, and was rumoured to join Ivar Morten Normark's Gevir. By October, his total playing time in the league was only 300 seconds, according to Nordlandsposten, which all came during a single match against Sogndal. He was not even benched for most games, watching home games from the stands and not travelling to away games. His contract was also due to expire. In 1998, Hansen was the player-manager of Gevir, which Normark had left. The team struggled against relegation, but ultimately survived the 1998 2. divisjon. Hansen stated his wish to continue as a player only.

== Honours ==
- Norwegian First Division: 1991, 1992
- Norwegian Football Cup: 1993
