= 1992 Norwegian Football Cup final =

- Event: 1992 Norwegian Football Cup
Rosenborg	Lillestrøm
3	2
- Date: 25 October 1992
- Venue: Ullevaal Stadion, Oslo
- Referee: Rune Pedersen
- Attendance: 28,217

The 1992 Norwegian Football Cup final was the final match of the 1992 Norwegian Football Cup, the 87th season of the Norwegian Football Cup, the premier Norwegian football cup competition organized by the Football Association of Norway (NFF). The match was played on 25 October 1992 at the Ullevaal Stadion in Oslo, and opposed two Tippeligaen sides Rosenborg and Lillestrøm. Rosenborg defeated Lillestrøm 3–2 to claim the Norwegian Cup for a sixth time in their history.

== Route to the final ==
Rosenborg			Round	Lillestrøm		
Orkanger	A	5–0	Round 1	Høland	A	6–1
Stålkameratene	A	8–0	Round 2	Sørumsand	H	1–0
Kristiansund	H	5–1	Round 3	Nybergsund	A	3–0
Start	A	1–0 aet	Round 4	Lyn	H	3–2
Strømsgodset	H	7–0	Quarterfinal	Tromsø	A	2–1
Viking	H	2–1 aet	Semifinal	Kongsvinger	H	1–0

== Match ==
=== Details ===
25 October 1992
13:15 CET (UTC+1)

Rosenborg	3–2	Lillestrøm
Dahlum 29'; Sørloth 50'; Bjørnebye 90'	Report	Mjelde 31', 60'

Ullevaal Stadion, Oslo
Attendance: 28,217
Referee: Rune Pedersen (Sprint/Jeløy)

Rosenborg	Lillestrøm

Rosenborg:
GK	(Norway) Ola By Rise
DF	(Norway) Trond Henriksen	(yellow card)	(substituted off) 61'
DF	(Norway) Rune Tangen
DF	(Norway) Bjørn Otto Bragstad
DF	(Norway) Stig Inge Bjørnebye
MF	(Norway) Kåre Ingebrigtsen
MF	(Norway) Øyvind Leonhardsen
MF	(Norway) Bent Skammelsrud
FW	(Norway) Karl Petter Løken
FW	(Norway) Gøran Sørloth
FW	(Norway) Tore André Dahlum
Substitutions:
DF	(Norway) Øivind Husby	(substituted in) 61'
MF	(Norway) Roar Strand
Coach:
(Norway) Nils Arne Eggen

Lillestrøm:
GK	(Norway) Frode Grodås
DF	(Sweden) Dennis Schiller
DF	(Norway) Arne Erlandsen
DF	(Norway) Torgeir Bjarmann
DF	(Norway) Henning Berg	(substituted off) 75'
MF	(Norway) Jan Ove Pedersen
MF	(Norway) Tom Gulbrandsen
MF	(Norway) Kjetil Osvold
MF	(Norway) Tom Buer
FW	(Scotland) Stuart McManus
FW	(Norway) Mons Ivar Mjelde
Substitution:
DF	(Norway) Dag Eidsvik	(substituted in) 75'
Coach:
(Norway) Ivar Hoff
