= Eventyret Drillos =

1998 non-fiction book

- Author: Jan Holm, Sjur Natvig, Øyvind Larsen, Einar Sigmundstad, Egil Olsen
- Language: Norwegian
- Subject: Norway's national football team from 1990 to 1998
- Publisher: Schibsted
- Pages: 224
- ISBN: 82-516-1734-0

Eventyret Drillos is a 1998 non-fiction book about association football published in 1998 by Schibsted in Norway. The book specifically details the era when Egil "Drillo" Olsen served as manager of the Norway national football team, from 1990 to 1998, analyzing the team's exploits and portraying it as an adventure or fairytale.

== Contents ==
The book was written by journalists Sjur Natvig and Jan Holm together with football analysts Øyvind Larsen and Einar Sigmundstad, and finally Egil Olsen himself. Most photographs were by Verdens Gang's Bjørn Delebekk. The purpose was to explain why Norway managed to qualify for two FIFA World Cups in 1994 and 1998, having been absent from the tournament since the 1930s and not considered a serious contender during the intermittent decades. The emphasis was put on the "Drillo style" of football, as well as Egil Olsen's personality and leadership and various choices in composing and training the squad. The book contained facts and analyses of all 88 matches with Olsen in charge, as well as excerpts from diaries written by Olsen during the 1998 World Cup.

== Reception ==
Writing for Aftenposten, Dag Vidar Hanstad called Eventyret Drillo "the best book" on the topic. While the story about Norway's national team had been told continuously in the media, the book offered something in terms of analyses and facts. The photography and editing were good too, with "great shot after great shot". Bergens Tidende noted the same positive criticisms in their review, calling Eventyret Drillo a standing stone and a splendid work—though "some of the chapters do not hold up to World Cup standard".

Tønsbergs Blad called it "a masterpiece" and echoed the verdict as "the best book about the Drillo era". Fredriksstad Blad also opined that this was among the better books on this topic, "guaranteedly a bestseller among the football crowd". FB gave a dice throw of 5 (out of 6), adding that the book was "exquisite".

Gudbrandsdølen Dagningen called it a complete work of reference, but noted that the product had an officious air to it, being made by "Drillo's own people". Asker og Bærums Budstikke echoed this sentiment, calling Olsen's own participation "both a strength and a weakness". The book could "probably not" have been written without Olsen, but the reviewer had doubts and concerns regarding the independence of the four other co-authors. At the same time, the book was both well-written and impressive, reaching a level of popular science about football.
