= Sigmundstad =

Sigmundstad is a Norwegian surname. Notable people with the surname include:

- Einar Sigmundstad (born 1952), Norwegian football manager and educator
- Lars Sigmundstad (born 1943), Norwegian politician
