= Terje Nilsen =

Norwegian singer-songwriter (1951–2019)

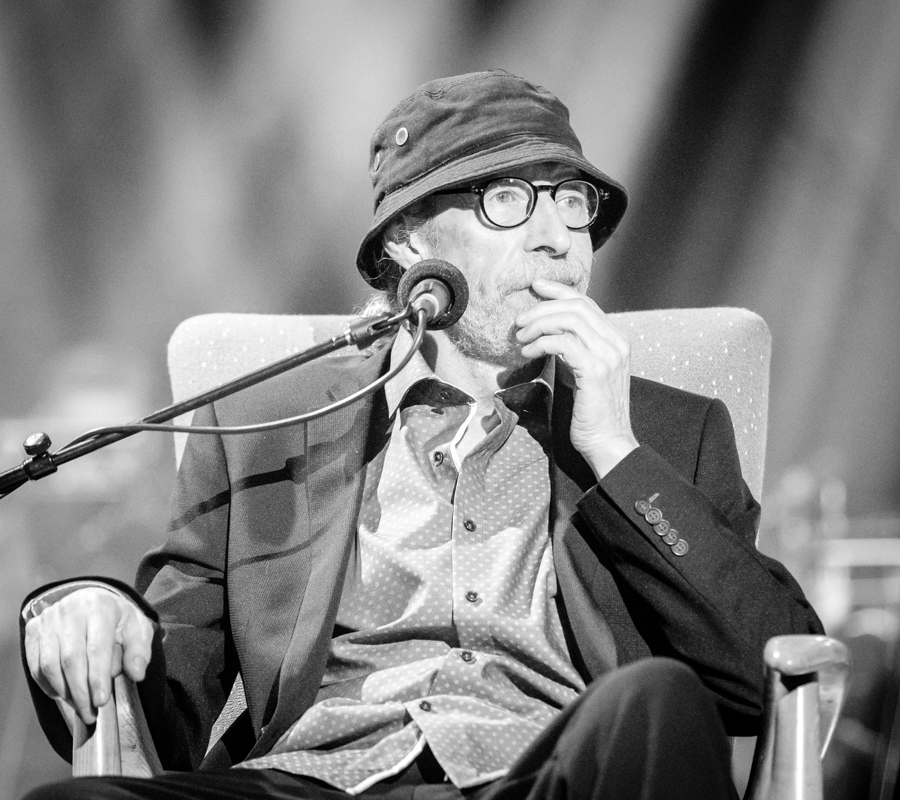
- Nilsen at the stage in 2018

Background information
- Born: 26 November 1951; Svolvær, Lofoten, Norway
- Died: 20 March 2019 (aged 67)
- Occupations: Singer, songwriter

Terje Nilsen (26 November 1951 – 20 March 2019) was a Norwegian singer and songwriter. Nilsen's greatest hit is the song "Mjelle", written in 1974, and appearing on the album "Æ" released in 1977. It later appeared on the album "Kanskje", released in 1990, and had a spell on Norsktoppen.

In addition to his own recordings, Nilsen has collaborated with several well-known Norwegian artists. For instance, he has performed together with Halvdan Sivertsen on numerous occasions. He also sings the chorus on "Pøbla" by north Norwegian hip-hop group Tungtvann, which was a big hit in Norway around 2002.

He was the profile of the year in Nordland Musikkfestuke in 2003.

Nilsen was the uncle of former professional footballers Runar Berg, Ørjan Berg and Arild Berg.

He died on 20 March 2019, aged 67.

== Discography ==
=== Solo ===
- Jean/Nytt og mitt (Jean/New and mine, 7" vinyl single 1973)
- Æ (Me, 1977)
- Pop (1983)
- Sørpolnissen (Only on Music Cassette, for Norsk Rikskringkasting) (South pole Santa, 1987)
- Kanskje (Maybe, 1990)
- Frie fugler... (for Nord-Norsk Lederutvikling) (Free birds..., 1995)
- Sånn (Like that, 1996)
- N'te gang (Nth time, 2005)
- Sommernatt promotionsingle (Summers night, 2006)
- Vi gjør det promotionsingle (Lets do it, 2006)
- Portrett (portrait, 2006)
- Møte med Bodø Symfonietta (Meeting, 2010)
- Gledeståra (Tears of joy, 2012)
- Nye låta (New songs, 2016)

=== With others ===
- Lille Bille (Small beetle, 2003), performed by Eva Trones, written by Terje Nilsen. Won Spellemannsprisen 2004.
- Tango for en (Tango for one, 2011), performed by Eva Trones, written by Terje Nilsen.

== Honors ==
- Blixprisen 1997
- Bodø Municipality culture award 2002
- Gammlengprisen 2002
