= Kyrre Nilsen =

Norwegian footballer (born 1970)

Personal information
- Date of birth: 22 January 1970 (age 56)
- Position: Forward

Senior career*
Years	Team	Apps	(Gls)
1987–1991	Ballstad		
1992	Gevir Bodø		
1993	Bodø/Glimt	0	(0)
1993	Gevir Bodø		
1994–1995	Bodø/Glimt	8	(1)
1996–1997	Gevir Bodø		
1998–2000	Mercantile		
- * Club domestic league appearances and goals

Kyrre Nilsen (born 22 January 1970) is a retired Norwegian football striker.

Starting his career in Ballstad, he joined Gevir Bodø in 1992. He then went on to second-tier Bodø/Glimt in 1993, returned to Gevir after only a few months, but in 1994 he commenced a second spell in Bodø/Glimt, now in Eliteserien. After 8 league games in 1994 and 0 in 1995 he returned to Gevir ahead of the 1996 season. He moved south after the 1997 season to pursue an administrative job at the University of Oslo and play part-time for Mercantile.
