= Westad =

Westad is a surname. Notable people with the surname include:

- Odd Arne Westad (born 1960), Norwegian historian
- Rohnny Westad (born 1972), Norwegian footballer
