= 1991 Norwegian Football Cup =

Norgesmesterskapet i fotball for herrer

Tournament details
- Country: Norway
- Teams: 128 (main competition)

Final positions
- Champions: Strømsgodset (4th title)
- Runners-up: Rosenborg

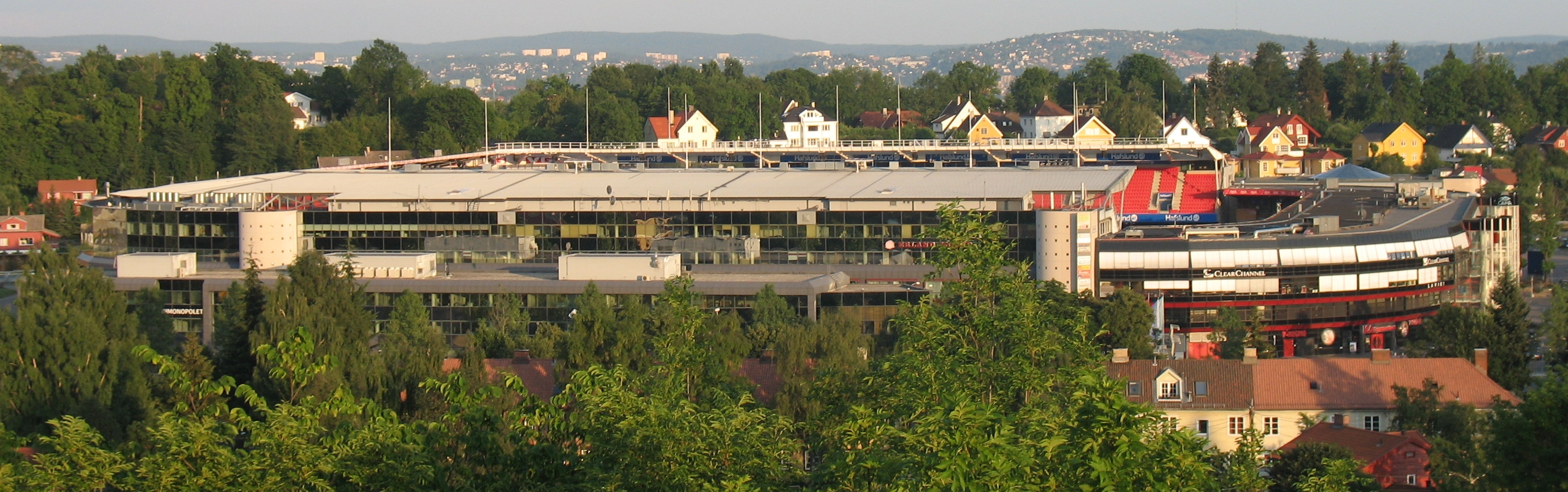
Ullevaal Stadion, Oslo - venue for the Norwegian Cup final

The 1991 Norwegian Football Cup was the 86th edition of the Norwegian Football Cup. The final took place at Ullevaal Stadion in Oslo on 20 October 1991. Strømsgodset were won the Norwegian Cup after they defeated Rosenborg with the score 3–2. This was Strømsgodset's fourth Norwegian Cup title.

== Calendar ==
Below are the dates for each round as given by the official schedule:

| Round | Date(s) | Number of fixtures | Clubs |
|---|---|---|---|
| First Round | 29–30 May 1991 | 64 | 128 → 64 |
| Second Round | 11–12 June 1991 | 32 | 64 → 32 |
| Third Round | 26 June 1991 | 16 | 32 → 16 |
| Fourth Round | 24 July 1991 | 9 | 16 → 8 |
| Quarter-finals | 14 August 1991 | 5 | 8 → 4 |
| Semi-finals | 14–15 September 1991 | 2 | 4 → 2 |
| Final | 20 October 1991 | 1 | 2 → 1 |

== First round ==
| Team 1 | Score | Team 2 |
|---|---|---|
29 May 1991
| Alvdal | 2–3 | Elverum |
| Strømmen | 6–1 (a.e.t.) | Skotterud |
| Nybergsund | 0–2 | Kongsvinger |
| Faaberg | 3–0 | Gjøvik-Lyn |
| Ranheim | 1–1 (2–4 p) | Melhus |
| KIL/Hemne | 0–5 | Rosenborg |
| Heimdal | 1–2 (a.e.t.) | Stjørdals/Blink |
| Clausenengen | 2–1 | Kristiansund |
| Randaberg | 0–3 | Viking |
| Flekkefjord | 0–3 | Ålgård |
| Bryne | 3–0 | Klepp |
| Lyngbø | 1–4 | Stord |
| Brann | 4–0 | Åsane |
| Figgjo | 1–2 | Ulf-Sandnes |
| Haugar | 4–1 | Skjold |
| Skjervøy | 1–4 | Tromsdalen |
| Grovfjord | 3–2 | Bodø/Glimt |
| Grue | 0–1 | Lillestrøm |
| Rakkestad | 1–0 | Fredrikstad |
| Jerv | 1–2 | Vindbjart |
| Kvinesdal | 2–6 (a.e.t.) | Start |
| Tønsberg FK | 1–4 (a.e.t.) | Pors |
| Fram Larvik | 1–0 | Drafn |
| Alta | 2–1 | Honningsvåg |
| Lyngen/Karnes | 0–1 | Tromsø |
| Skarp | 0–2 | Mjølner |
| Luna | 4–2 (a.e.t.) | Harstad |
| Florø | 1–6 | Sogndal |
| Løv-Ham | 3–1 | Vadmyra |
| Hareid | 1–3 (a.e.t.) | Hødd |
| Sunndal | 5–1 | Surnadal |
| Narvik/Nor | 0–0 (2–3 p) | Svolvær |
| Sandnessjøen | 1–2 | Fauske/Sprint |
| Liv/Fossekallen | 1–3 | Strømsgodset |
| Fram Skatval | 1–2 | Steinkjer |
| Nessegutten | 2–0 | Nardo |
| Eidsvold Turn | 0–4 | HamKam |
| Lørenskog | 2–1 | Bærum |
| Sprint/Jeløy | 2–4 | Eik-Tønsberg |
| Langesund | 2–1 | Ørn-Horten |
| Strindheim | 3–3 (3–4 p) | Namsos |
| Stålkameratene | 2–1 | Brønnøysund |
| Selbak | 0–4 | Moss |
| Ullern | 2–1 | Sørumsand |
| Sarpsborg FK | 3–1 | Bjørkelangen |
| Riska | 0–1 | Vard Haugesund |
| Odda | 0–3 | Djerv 1919 |
| Voss | 0–4 | Fyllingen |
| Ny-Krohnborg | 1–3 | Fana |
| Stryn | 2–3 (a.e.t.) | Volda |
| Stranda | 0–1 (a.e.t.) | Aalesund |
| Isfjorden | 0–8 | Molde |
| Skarbøvik | 0–3 | Åndalsnes |
| Stabæk | 0–2 | Skeid |
| Mjøndalen | 5–1 | Odd |
| Torp | 2–4 | Drøbak/Frogn |
| Åssiden | 0–1 | Kjelsås |
| Lyn | 6–1 | Furuset |
| Asker | 1–4 | Grei |
| Sandefjord BK | 3–1 | Teie |
30 May 1991
| Bjarg | 0–2 | Os |
| Mercantile | 0–4 | Råde |
2 June 1991
| Slemmestad | 1–2 | Vålerenga |
3 June 1991
| Frigg | 2–2 (5–3 p) | Ski |

== Second round ==
| Team 1 | Score | Team 2 |
|---|---|---|
11 June 1991
| Ulf-Sandnes | 2–4 | Haugar |
| Namsos | 2–1 | Stålkameratene |
12 June 1991
| Elverum | 1–0 (a.e.t.) | Strømmen |
| Kongsvinger | 7–1 | Faaberg |
| Melhus | 0–6 | Rosenborg |
| Stjørdals/Blink | 2–0 | Clausenengen |
| Os | 0–1 | Viking |
| Ålgård | 0–2 | Bryne |
| Stord | 0–1 | Brann |
| Tromsdalen | 0–0 (3–5 p) | Grovfjord |
| Lillestrøm | 2–0 | Rakkestad |
| Vindbjart | 0–8 | Start |
| Pors | 2–0 | Fram Larvik |
| Alta | 2–2 (11–12 p) | Tromsø |
| Mjølner | 2–0 | Luna |
| Sogndal | 4–0 | Løv-Ham |
| Hødd | 5–1 | Sunndal |
| Svolvær | 2–1 (a.e.t.) | Fauske/Sprint |
| Strømsgodset | 1–1 (4–2 p) | Råde |
| Steinkjer | 2–0 | Nessegutten |
| HamKam | 5–0 | Lørenskog |
| Eik-Tønsberg | 7–0 | Langesund |
| Moss | 3–0 | Ullern |
| Vålerenga | 2–1 | Sarpsborg FK |
| Vard Haugesund | 0–1 | Djerv 1919 |
| Fyllingen | 4–0 | Fana |
| Volda | 0–2 | Aalesund |
| Molde | 3–1 | Åndalsnes |
| Skeid | 0–1 | Mjøndalen |
| Drøbak/Frogn | 4–2 | Frigg |
| Kjelsås | 0–3 | Lyn |
| Grei | 5–0 | Sandefjord BK |

== Third round ==
| Team 1 | Score | Team 2 |
|---|---|---|
25 June 1991
| Moss | 4–1 | Vålerenga |
26 June 1991
| Elverum | 0–3 | Kongsvinger |
| Rosenborg | 5–1 | Stjørdals/Blink |
| Brann | 6–2 | Haugar |
| Grovfjord | 1–4 | Lillestrøm |
| Start | 3–1 | Pors |
| Tromsø | 1–0 | Mjølner |
| Sogndal | 5–1 | Hødd |
| Svolvær | 0–4 | Strømsgodset |
| Steinkjer | 1–5 | HamKam |
| Eik-Tønsberg | 5–0 | Namsos |
| Djerv 1919 | 0–1 | Fyllingen |
| Aalesund | 1–2 | Molde |
| Mjøndalen | 1–1 (4–2 p) | Drøbak/Frogn |
| Lyn | 5–1 | Grei |
27 June 1991
| Viking | 3–1 | Bryne |

== Fourth round ==
23 July 1991

| Mjøndalen | 3–2 | Lyn |
|---|---|---|
| Hansen 58'; Fornes 66'; Markussen 74' | | Haugen 42'; Sundby 70' |

Nedre Eiker Stadion, Mjøndalen
Attendance: 3,317
Referee: Kjell Nordby

24 July 1991

| Kongsvinger | 4–4 (a.e.t.) | Rosenborg |
|---|---|---|
| Francis 5'; Riisnæs 32'; Sanderud 66'; Husby 84' (o.g.) | | Skammelsrud 7', 14', 79'; Ingebrigtsen 25' |

Gjemselund Stadion, Kongsvinger
Attendance: 4,996
Referee: Tore Hollung

24 July 1991

| Viking | 2–1 | Brann |
|---|---|---|
| Tveit 29', 89' | | Filipczak 50' |

Stavanger Stadion, Stavanger
Attendance: 7,479
Referee: Svein Kjellbrott

24 July 1991

| Lillestrøm | 1–0 (a.e.t.) | Start |
|---|---|---|
| Bjarmann 102' |

Åråsen Stadion, Lillestrøm
Attendance: 4,509
Referee: Bjørn Kronborg

24 July 1991

| Tromsø | 3–2 (a.e.t.) | Sogndal |
|---|---|---|
| Espejord 11'; T. Johansen 48'; Angvik 119' | | Fylling 75'; Førde 89' |

Alfheim Stadion, Tromsø
Attendance: 3,687
Referee: Egil Nervik

24 July 1991

| Strømsgodset | 4–3 | HamKam |
|---|---|---|
| Johannessen 5'; Nordeide 35'; Storskogen 58'; Andersen 77' | | Svorkmo 9', 53'; Ingelstad 15' |

Marienlyst Stadion, Drammen
Attendance: 4,560
Referee: Terje Singsaas

24 July 1991

| Eik-Tønsberg | 2–1 | Moss |
|---|---|---|
| Sundby 62'; Fagernes 89' | | Pedersen 26' |

Tønsberg Gressbane, Tønsberg
Attendance: 3,237
Referee: Roy Helge Olsen

24 July 1991

| Fyllingen | 3–0 | Molde |
|---|---|---|
| Ludvigsen 3', 45'; Vikenes 41' (pen.) |

Krohnsminde, Bergen
Attendance: 1,943
Referee: Svein G. Hermansen

=== Replay ===
6 August 1991

| Rosenborg | 1–0 | Kongsvinger |
|---|---|---|
| Løken 43' |

Lerkendal Stadion, Trondheim
Attendance: 19,131
Referee: Einar Halle

== Quarter-finals ==
14 August 1991

| Rosenborg | 3–2 | Viking |
|---|---|---|
| Sørloth 34'; Tangen 45' (pen.); Skammelsrud 80' | | Aase 11'; Tveit 43' |

Lerkendal Stadion, Trondheim
Attendance: 21,261
Referee: Per Arne Larsgård

14 August 1991

| Lillestrøm | 2–1 | Tromsø |
|---|---|---|
| Nilsen 17' (o.g.); Gulbrandsen 80' (pen.) | | B. Johansen 10' |

Åråsen Stadion, Lillestrøm
Attendance: 5,391
Referee: Rune Pedersen

14 August 1991

| Strømsgodset | 2–1 | Eik-Tønsberg |
|---|---|---|
| Knutsen 5'; Storskogen 45' (pen.) | | G. Johansen 90+2' |

Marienlyst Stadion, Drammen
Attendance: 9,430
Referee: Terje Hauge

14 August 1991

| Fyllingen | 2–2 (a.e.t.) | Mjøndalen |
|---|---|---|
| Ludvigsen 16'; Hellesø 80' | | Hansen 9'; Fornes 52' |

Varden Amfi, Bergen
Attendance: 2,605
Referee: Arild Thorp

=== Replay ===
21 August 1991

| Mjøndalen | 4–2 (a.e.t.) | Fyllingen |
|---|---|---|
| Fornes 4'; Markussen 45'; Ludvigsen 106' (o.g.); Jensen 116' | | Jørgensen 6'; Vikenes 69' |

Nedre Eiker Stadion, Mjøndalen
Attendance: 5,745
Referee: Roy Helge Olsen

== Semi-finals ==
14 September 1991

| Rosenborg | 3–1 (a.e.t.) | Lillestrøm |
|---|---|---|
| Skammelsrud 26'; Brandhaug 114'; Brattbakk 120' | | Amundsen 51' |

Lerkendal Stadion, Trondheim
Attendance: 12,749
Referee: Einar Halle

15 September 1991

| Strømsgodset | 2–0 | Mjøndalen |
|---|---|---|
| Johnsen 35', 67' |

Marienlyst Stadion, Drammen
Attendance: 14,254
Referee: Arild Haugstad

== Final ==
20 October 1991
13:15 CET (UTC+1)

| Strømsgodset | 3–2 | Rosenborg |
|---|---|---|
| Johnsen 14', 28'; Nordeide 70' | Report | Løken 3'; Sørloth 71' |

Ullevaal Stadion, Oslo
Attendance: 27,240
Referee: Roy Helge Olsen (Frigg)
