= 1991 Norwegian Football Cup final =

- Event: 1991 Norwegian Football Cup
Strømsgodset	Rosenborg
3	2
- Date: 20 October 1991
- Venue: Ullevaal Stadion, Oslo
- Referee: Roy Helge Olsen
- Attendance: 27,240

The 1991 Norwegian Football Cup final was the final match of the 1991 Norwegian Football Cup, the 86th season of the Norwegian Football Cup, the premier Norwegian football cup competition organized by the Football Association of Norway (NFF). The match was played on 20 October 1991 at the Ullevaal Stadion in Oslo, and opposed two Tippeligaen sides Strømsgodset and Rosenborg. Strømsgodset defeated Rosenborg 3–2 to claim the Norwegian Cup for a fourth time in their history.

== Route to the final ==
Strømsgodset		Round	Rosenborg		
Liv/Fossekallen	3–1 (A)	Round 1	KIL/Hemne	5–0 (A)	
Råde	1–1 (4–2 p) (H)	Round 2	Melhus	6–0 (A)	
Svolvær	4–0 (A)	Round 3	Stjørdals/Blink	5–1 (H)	
HamKam	4–3 (H)	Round 4	Kongsvinger	4–4 aet (A)	1–0 (H)
Eik-Tønsberg	2–1 (H)	Quarterfinal	Viking	3–2 (H)	
Mjøndalen	2–0 (H)	Semifinal	Lillestrøm	3–1 aet (H)	

== Match ==
=== Details ===
20 October 1991
13:15 CET (UTC+1)

Strømsgodset	3–2	Rosenborg
Johnsen 14', 28'; Nordeide 70'	Report	Løken 3'; Sørloth 71'

Ullevaal Stadion, Oslo
Attendance: 27,240
Referee: Roy Helge Olsen (Frigg)

Strømsgodset	Rosenborg

Strømsgodset:
GK	(Norway) Frode Olsen
RB	(Norway) Vegard Hansen
CB	(Norway) Frode Johannessen
CB	(Norway) Arne Erlandsen
LB	(Norway) Jan Wendelborg
RM	(Norway) Glenn Knutsen
CM	(Norway) Trond Nordeide
CM	(Norway) Geir Andersen
CM	(Norway) Halvor Storskogen
LM	(Norway) Odd Johnsen
CF	(Norway) Kenneth Nysæther
Substitutions:
DF	(Norway) Arne Gustavsen
FW	(Norway) Juro Kuvicek
Coach:
(Norway) Tor Røste Fossen

Rosenborg:
GK	(Norway) Ola By Rise
RB	(Norway) Øivind Husby
CB	(Norway) Bjørn Otto Bragstad
CB	(Norway) Rune Tangen
LB	(Norway) Trond Henriksen
RM	(Norway) Kåre Ingebrigtsen
CM	(Norway) Stig-Are Enlid
LM	(Norway) Bent Skammelsrud
RW	(Norway) Karl Petter Løken
CF	(Norway) Gøran Sørloth
LW	(Norway) Roar Strand
Coach:
(Norway) Nils Arne Eggen
