= Tor Fosse =

Norwegian footballer (1966–2024)

Personal information
- Date of birth: 8 February 1966
- Place of birth: Bryne, Norway
- Date of death: 27 November 2024 (aged 58)
- Place of death: Klepp, Norway
- Position: Central defender

Youth career
- Bryne FK

Senior career*
Years	Team	Apps	(Gls)
1983–1991	Bryne FK	141	(5)

International career
1984–1986	Norway U21	3	(0)
- * Club domestic league appearances and goals

Tor Fosse (8 February 1966 – 27 November 2024) was a Norwegian footballer who played for Bryne FK, mostly as a central defender.

Fosse made his debut for Bryne as a 17-year-old in 1983, and played a total of 277 first-team matches for the club, including 141 appearances and five goals in league competition. In 1987, he was a member of the Bryne side that won the Norwegian Cup, and was the only home-grown player in Bryne's starting lineup. He was also capped three times for Norway Under-21.

He retired from top-level football in 1991, at the relatively young age of 25. Outside football, he worked as an air traffic controller at Stavanger Airport. Fosse died in Klepp Municipality on 27 November 2024, at the age of 58, following a two-year battle against cancer.
