= Tom Buer =

Norwegian footballer (born 1970)

Personal information
- Full name: Tom Wedde Buer
- Date of birth: 15 March 1970 (age 56)
- Position: Midfielder

Youth career
- –1988: Lillestrøm

Senior career*
Years	Team	Apps	(Gls)
1989–1993	Lillestrøm	72	(3)
1994–1995	Lyn	22	(1)
1996–1997	Skjetten		
- Volla
- Flisbyen
- * Club domestic league appearances and goals

Tom Buer (born 15 March 1970) is a retired Norwegian football midfielder.

Hailed as the man of the match in the 1988 Norwegian Junior Cup final, which Lillestrøm however lost to Ørn, Buer was drafted into Lillestrøm's senior team in 1989 and amassed 72 league games. Buer was bought by ambitious Lyn Fotball in 1994. Failing to secure promotion to Eliteserien, he stayed two seasons, playing fewer than half the games. He subsequently climbed down the football ladder in Romerike, with Skjetten, Volla and Flisbyen.

Buer played both the 1992 Norwegian Football Cup Final, which Lillestrøm lost, and played the 1994 Norwegian Football Cup Final, which Lyn lost.
