= Tor Røste Fossen =

Norwegian footballer and manager (1940–2017)

Personal information
- Full name: Tor Røste Fossen
- Date of birth: 19 June 1940
- Place of birth: Kolbu, Norway
- Date of death: 7 August 2017 (aged 77)
- Position: Goalkeeper

Senior career*
Years	Team	Apps	(Gls)
1962	Rosenborg	1(?)	(0)
1963–1966	Rosenborg	28	(0)
1967–1971	Rosenborg	54	(0)

Managerial career
- 1970–1971: Rosenborg (assistant)
- 1972–1974: Rosenborg
- 1972–1976: Norway Junior
- 1975–1977: Start
- 1978–1987: Norway
- 1988–1989: Frigg
- 1990: Faaberg
- 1991: Strømsgodset
- 1992–2001: Frigg
- * Club domestic league appearances and goals

Tor Røste Fossen (19 June 1940 – 7 August 2017) was a Norwegian football player and coach. He played for Rosenborg from 1964 to 1971, earning two Norwegian Premier League titles and one Norwegian Cup championship. He coached several Norwegian clubs besides coaching the Norway national football team during ten years 1978–1987.

== Biography ==
Fossen grew up in Engerdal Municipality and Vågå Municipality. He came to Trondheim in 1962 where he played as goalkeeper in Rosenborg. Until 1969 Fossen played 55 matches in the top division. In 1970 a new goalkeeper, Geir Karlsen, arrived at Rosenborg, and Fossen was benched. He then became assistant coach under George Curtis, and in 1972 head coach together with Nils Arne Eggen coaching Rosenborg to the double, winning both the league and the cup titles. Fossen continued without Eggen 1973–1974, and the team became second both in the league and in the cup 1973. Fossen coached Start 1975–1977 to bronze medal in the league 1975. Besides this Fossen also coached Norway national team for juniors 1972–1976.

From 1978 to 1987 Fossen coached the Norway national football team. One of the victories in Fossen's time as Norway manager was the 2–1 win against England in the 1982 World cup qualification. This victory is eternalized by radio reporter Bjørge Lillelien. Fossen coached Norway in the 1984 Olympics.

Later Fossen coached Frigg Oslo, together with Hallvar Thoresen, Faaberg, and Strømsgodset, together with Einar Sigmundstad, winning the 1991 Norwegian Football Cup, beating Rosenborg 3–1 in the final. His last post as a coach was in Frigg Oslo before taking over other managerial tasks in the club. Fossen retired 2007.

== Honours ==
=== Player ===
Rosenborg

- Norwegian top division: 1967, 1969
- Norwegian Cup: 1971

=== Coach ===
Strømsgodset

- Norwegian Cup: 1991
