= Arild Berg =

Norwegian footballer (1975–2019)

Personal information
- Date of birth: 17 July 1975
- Place of birth: Bodø, Norway
- Date of death: 22 June 2019 (aged 43)
- Place of death: Bodø, Norway
- Position: Midfielder

Youth career
- –1993: Bodø/Glimt

Senior career*
Years	Team	Apps	(Gls)
1993–1995	Bodø/Glimt	44	(7)
1997	Gevir Bodø		
1998–2000	Bodø/Glimt	66	(16)
2002–2004	Lyn	0	(0)
- * Club domestic league appearances and goals

Arild Berg (17 July 1975 – 22 June 2019) was a Norwegian footballer who played as a midfielder.

== Career ==
A member of a noted footballing family, he was a son of Harald Berg and younger brother of Ørjan and Runar Berg, all Norway internationals who played in foreign leagues. Making his Bodø/Glimt league debut in 1993, Arild Berg was officially drafted into the first team in 1994; regarded as one of Norway's greatest talents and perhaps more so than his older brothers, he chose to never represent Norway as a youth or under-21 international. After the 1995 season he retired, citing a desire to structure his everyday activities more freely. Ahead of the 1997 season he rejected an offer from Rosenborg BK and signed for lowly FK Gevir Bodø.

In 1998, 1999 and 2000, Berg enjoyed a second spell with Bodø/Glimt. Amassing 110 league games, he fell ill and chose to leave Bodø/Glimt. A complicated process ended in a 2002 transfer to Lyn, though he was not able to train much. Lyn sponsor Atle Brynestad paid for various treatments. Mercury poisoning was believed to be Berg's diagnosis, with chronic fatigue syndrome later being stated as the cause. Berg stayed with Lyn for the remainder of his contract, throughout the 2004 season, without ever playing a game and barely training. Due to his condition he was advised to cut all ties with football, and he later stated that even watching matches on television would cause him great stress. On 22 June 2019, Berg died at the age of 43. According to a statement from his family, "Arild chose to leave us", indicating that he committed suicide.
