= Arild Thorp =

Norwegian football referee

Arild Rudolf Thorp (born 23 June 1954) is a Norwegian association football referee and director.

== Career ==
He grew up at Bekkestua and played football in lower divisions as a goalkeeper for Stabæk and Øvrevoll. He quit his playing career to start refereeing, officiating district matches from 1976.

Thorp made his referee debut in Norway's highest league in 1985, in the match Moss–Mjøndalen. In the same year, he was an assistant referee in the 1985–86 UEFA Cup. He continued in the highest league over the next years, but lost much of 1987 and the entire 1988 season from knee and calf injuries. He returned in 1990 and officiated in Eliteserien until 1995. In the 1992 season, Thorp was noted for issuing 3.6 yellow cards per match on average, by far the highest number in Eliteserien. The veteran referee Svein-Inge Thime suggested to retire the trio of Thorp, Arild Haugstad and Einar Halle (more precisely to "chuck out" the trio) and use them as tutors to develop a new generation of referees. Thime, who referred to them as "too old", opined that the quality of Norwegian referees in general had stagnated. In the same year, Thorp was an assistant referee in the 1992 Norwegian Football Cup final.

Outside of football, Thorp was store manager for the sports retailer Anton Sport at Bekkestua. After Stabæk were promoted to the 1994 Norwegian First Division, they hired Arild Thorp as managing director. Stabæk proceeded with a back-to-back promotion to the 1995 Eliteserien, and hired Tom Schelvan as director of sports, alleviating some of the work burden for Thorp. The tasks were soon differentiated further, with Thorp continuing as director of marketing, sponsors and events.

== Personal life ==
He married in 1978. He settled at Bærums Verk with his family. He is the father of professional golfer Marius Thorp. Arild Thorp also enjoyed bandy, horse racing and harness racing.
