= Einar Sigmundstad =

Norwegian football manager

Personal information
- Date of birth: 6 September 1952 (age 74)

Youth career
- –1970: Midtbygden
- 1970–1971: Viking

Senior career*
Years	Team	Apps	(Gls)
1971–1973	Viking	1	(0)
1974–1976	Lyn		
1977	Ready		

Managerial career
- 1977–1978: Norway U18 (team manager)
- 1978–1982: Norway U18
- 1978–1981: Bærum
- 1982: Sørumsand
- 1982: Frigg (youth coordinator)
- 1983–1984: Strømsgodset
- 1985: Fossum
- 1986–1987: Steinkjer
- 1988: Opphaug (men)
- 1988: Opphaug (women)
- 1989–1991: Strømsgodset
- 1992–1995: Sandefjord
- 1992–1993: Norway U16 women
- 1996: Frigg
- 1997: Ørn
- 1998–2000: Bærum
- 2001: Mercantile
- 2002: Strømsgodset (assistant)
- 2003–2004: Åssiden
- 2007–?: Heming
- * Club domestic league appearances and goals

Einar Sigmundstad (born 6 September 1952) is a Norwegian football manager and educator.

== Playing career ==
Hailing from Tau, he played for Midtbygdens IL before joining regional greats Viking FK. At the same time, he attended Stavanger Cathedral School, followed by a time as a naval officer at Madla naval camp. Viking was the dominant team in Norway from 1972, and Sigmundstad only managed to play a single game. After that he moved to Oslo where he played for SFK Lyn from 1973 to 1976. In 1977 he joined IF Ready on a lower tier, but prioritized coaching over playing.

== Managing career ==
Sigmundstad enrolled at the Norwegian School of Sport Sciences in 1973, graduated in 1975 and was subsequently employed. In 1976 he took over for Andreas Morisbak as co-head of the school's football education together with Egil Olsen. He was also a volleyball coach for the school team.

In 1977 he was also team manager of Norway U-18 with players such as Ola By Rise, Knut Torbjørn Eggen and Øivind Husby. The team took part in the 1978 UEFA European Under-18 Championship in Poland.

Ahead of the 1978 season he became head coach for Bærum SK. From mid-1978 he doubled as head coach of Norway U-18. He took the team to the 1979 UEFA European Under-18 Championship in Austria and the 1980 UEFA European Under-18 Championship in East Germany. In May 1980, his team achieved the best result in several years, beating the Netherlands U-18 5 to 1.

Bærum SK were relative newcomers at the third tier. In the 1980 3. divisjon they experienced a particularly good start, and eventually managed to secure promotion to the second tier, following a 2–0 victory against rivals Stabæk. Sigmundstad led Bærum through the 1981 2. divisjon before leaving the club. He took a job as head coach of Sørumsand IF. In late 1981 he was also supposed to take the job as youth coordinator of Lyn/Frigg, a rumoured merger of Lyn and Frigg. When the merger fell through, he nonetheless became youth coordinator of Frigg while Egil Olsen was the head coach. Sigmundstad left Frigg after the 1982 season. In addition, he finally left Norway U-18 after five years in charge, leaving Anders Fægri to take over the reins.

For the time being, Sigmundstad would concentrate on one coaching job, after he was hired as head coach of Strømsgodset IF. The decision was announced in September 1982, effective from 1983. Toward the end of the 1984 season, disagreements between Sigmundstad and Strømsgodset's board were brewing. Sigmundstad voiced his concerns to the press and in a letter to the leaders of Strømsgodset. Sigmundstad stated that his sentiments were of "pure desperation", and that the letter was sent a "a last resort to wake the club up". The board of directors interpreted his letter as a letter of resignation and discontinued Sigmundstad's tenure. The decision was announced right after New Year's Day 1985.

Sigmundstad did not remain idle. In February 1985 he agreed to take over fourth-tier team Fossum IF following the death of their previous coach. Ahead of the 1986 season, Sigmundstad was signed by Steinkjer I&FK to take them back to the first tier. The board of directors had vowed to acquire a coach from another part of Norway, but Sigmundstad was reportedly the fourth or fifth candidate on the shortlist. Sigmundstad was re-signed for the 1987 season, but received growing criticism from Steinkjer fans and press. The local newspaper lambasted him for inadequate physical exercise, "endless theory and tactics chat" and lacking "particular strength in getting the players "sufficiently ignited". A few days after losing to Nidelv/Falken, Sigmundstad was sacked with immediate effect and replaced with former coach Bill Foulkes. After considering legal action, he was given full pay throughout his contract period.

Ahead of the 1988 season, he travelled to Haugesund to discuss a possible contract with SK Haugar. This move did not materialize, and Sigmundstad stayed in Trøndelag, coaching both the men's and women's team of lowly Opphaug IL. He moved back to Oslo in the summer of 1988, vowing to commute to Ørland Municipality during the weekends to finish the 1988 season at Opphaug.

In October 1988 his return to Strømsgodset was announced. This time, he would be co-coach together with Harald Ramsfjell. After working alongside Harald Ramsfjell in 1989 and 1990, Tor Røste Fossen was brought in as Sigmundstad's partner in 1991. Strømsgodset were relegated from the 1991 Eliteserien, and it became clear that co-coach Fossen would leave at the end of the 1991 season. Sigmundstad expressed his desire to remain at Strømsgodset's sole coach in 1992. However, the board worked with another option, trying to hire Tom Lund. After being declared unwanted, Sigmundstad and Fossen coached Strømsgodset to victory in the 1991 Norwegian Football Cup final, qualifying the now-relegated team for the 1992–93 European Cup Winners' Cup.

Wanted by Tromsdalen UIL as their head coach, Sigmundstad was not able to leave Eastern Norway at the time and rejected the job offer. Instead, he signed for Sandefjord BK. Sandefjord was in a lower tier at the time, and as such was possible to combine with Sigmundstad's work as a coordinator and lecturer at the Norwegian School of Sport Sciences. He also part-timed as head coach of Norway women's national under-16 football team.

Sigmundstad led Sandefjord to promotion from the 1994 2. divisjon, but as the 1995 1. divisjon progressed, wear and tear in the working relation became apparent. Already in July 1995 his departure from Sandefjord due to mutual consent was announced. Despite this, he continued throughout the season. Sigmundstad criticized several fans and "know-it-alls" around the club, and started that "we have been experiencing the Sandefjord culture at its worst".

In January and February 1996, the media reported extensively on negotiations between Sigmundstad and IK Start to take over the vacant manager position there. Start's chairman Helge Henriksen reportedly offered Sigmundstad the job over the phone, but a few days later, Start retracted this offer. Instead he partnered up with Tor Røste Fossen again to manage Frigg, whereas FK Ørn Horten managed to acquire Sigmundstad's signature ahead of the 1997 season.

Despite a decent 1997 season, Sigmundstad made the announcement in September 1997 that he would not continue in Ørn, opting to return to his former club Bærum. In 2000, the squad expressed a desire for renewal, and Sigmundstad's contract was not prolonged. Sigmundstad spent 2001 as head coach of Mercantile, eliminating Bærum from the 2001 Norwegian Football Cup, but failing to win promotion from the 2001 3. divisjon. He was brought back to Strømsgodset once again, this time as the assistant manager under Arne Dokken, but was sacked after the 2002 season.

He remained in Drammen, taking over city minnows Åssiden IF. In 2006 he reportedly made the shortlist for new Aalesunds FK manager, but was not hired, and instead joined minnows IL Heming.

Sigmundstad has two children. He resided at Hosle. At the Norwegian School of Sport Sciences, Egil Olsen was mostly on leave from 1990, and left in 2008, leaving Sigmundstad as the sole head of the school's football education. In 2016 he got Mathias Haugaasen on board as co-head, before Sigmundstad left the position in 2018, having served for 40 years.
