= IL Bølgen =

Norwegian sports club

- Full name: Idrettslaget Bølgen
- Founded: 21 July 1946
- Ground: Mosedalen stadion, Bugøynes
- League: none
Home colours

Idrettslaget Bølgen ("The Wave") is a Norwegian sports club from Bugøynes, Finnmark.

The men's football team played in the Third Division, the fourth tier of Norwegian football, from 1992 to 1995. Their best player was Ola Haldorsen.

The club currently does not field any football team.

== Recent seasons ==
Season	Level	Division	Section	Position	Movements	Source
1999	Tier 5	4. divisjon	Finnmark avd. 1 øst	6th/7		
2000	Tier 5	4. divisjon	Finnmark avd. 1 øst	6th/6		
2001	Tier 5	4. divisjon	Finnmark avd. 1 øst	2nd/8		
2002	Tier 5	4. divisjon	Finnmark avd. 1 øst	3rd/6		
2003	Tier 5	4. divisjon	Finnmark avd. 1 øst	3rd/6		
2004	Tier 5	4. divisjon	Finnmark avd. 1 øst	1st/8		
2005	Tier 5	4. divisjon	Finnmark avd. 1 øst	2nd/9		
2006	Tier 5	4. divisjon	Finnmark avd. 1 øst	6th/9		
2007	did not participate					
2008	Tier 5	4. divisjon	Finnmark avd. 1 øst	8th/10		
