= Ruben Bakke =

Norwegian footballer (born 1972)

Personal information
- Date of birth: 13 March 1972 (age 54)
- Height: 1.82 m (6 ft 0 in)
- Position: Midfielder

Senior career*
Years	Team	Apps	(Gls)
1991–1992	Tromsø	10	(0)
1993–1994	Strømsgodset		
1995	Stålkameratene		
1996	Skjetten		
1997–1998	Drøbak-Frogn		
1999	Manglerud Star		
- * Club domestic league appearances and goals

Ruben Bakke (born 13 March 1972) is a retired Norwegian football midfielder.

Hailing from Håpet in Tromsø, Bakke broke through in Tromsø IL's first team in 1991. After the 1992 season he took two seasons in Strømsgodset IF, losing the 1993 Norwegian Football Cup Final. He continued as a journeyman in IL Stålkameratene, Skjetten SK, Drøbak-Frogn IL and Manglerud Star.

After retiring he tried his hand in various professions, relocating to Fosnavåg.
