= Jan Tore Amundsen (footballer, born 1968) =

Norwegian footballer (born 1968)

Personal information
- Date of birth: 30 August 1968 (age 58)
- Height: 1.76 m (5 ft 9 in)
- Position: Midfielder

Youth career
- Rælingen
- –1986: Lillestrøm

Senior career*
Years	Team	Apps	(Gls)
1987–1988	Lillestrøm	5	(0)
1989–1992	Lyn		
1993	Drøbak-Frogn		
1994	Skjetten		

International career
1985	Norway U16	5	(1)
1986	Norway U17	5	(0)
- * Club domestic league appearances and goals

Jan Tore Amundsen (born 30 August 1968) is a retired Norwegian football midfielder.

From Rælingen, he joined Lillestrøm's junior setup and represented Norway as a youth international. On the road to Lillestrøm's 1986 Junior Norwegian Championship win, Amundsen scored three goals in Lillestrøm's 4-1 quarter-final victory over Start. Ahead of the 1987 season he was drafted into the senior squad, among others together with Jan Ove Pedersen and Roar Øien.

Amundsen was unable to earn a regular spot in Lillestrøm's line-up and he quietly left the club. Along with Stein Amundsen, Bård Bjerkeland and Tom Sundby, he was one of four players who transferred to Lyn. From 1989 through 1992 he played for Lyn in Eliteserien and 1. divisjon. He went on to Drøbak-Frogn IL and Skjetten SK.
