= Runar Berg =

Norwegian footballer (born 1970)

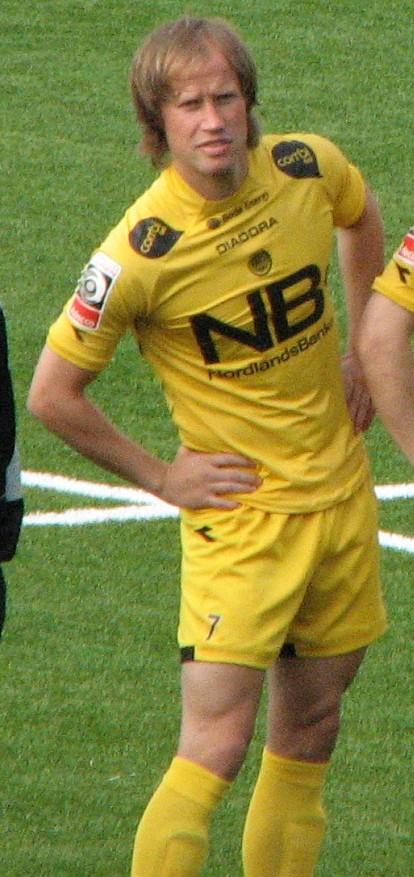

Personal information
- Date of birth: 7 October 1970 (age 56)
- Place of birth: The Hague, Netherlands
- Height: 1.79 m (5 ft 10 in)
- Position: Midfielder

Youth career
- 1989: Bodø/Glimt

Senior career*
Years	Team	Apps	(Gls)
1989	Bodø/Glimt		
1990	Rosenborg	10	(0)
1991	Tromsø	18	(2)
1992–1996	Bodø/Glimt	111	(29)
1997–1999	Rosenborg	69	(13)
1999–2001	Venezia	30	(2)
2001	→ Lyn (loan)	23	(3)
2002–2010	Bodø/Glimt	204	(41)

International career
1986	Norway U15	9	(0)
1987	Norway U16	6	(0)
1988	Norway U18	1	(0)
1994–2003	Norway	5	(0)
- * Club domestic league appearances and goals

Runar Berg (born 7 October 1970) is a Norwegian former professional footballer who played as a midfielder. He played for Bodø/Glimt, Rosenborg, Tromsø, Lyn, and Venezia. Berg is brother of former Bodø/Glimt and Rosenborg player Ørjan Berg, and son of former Bodø/Glimt midfielder and playmaker Harald Berg.

== Personal life ==
Berg was born in The Hague, Netherlands, when his father Harald Berg played for ADO Den Haag. He is the brother of footballers Ørjan Berg and Arild Berg, as well as musician Terje Berg. Berg is also the nephew of Norwegian folk-singer Terje Nilsen.

== Club career ==
At the start of his adult football life, Runar Berg played – as his father – at Bodø/Glimt, then playing in the 1st division. The 1988 season Bodø/Glimt got relegated to the 2nd division. Runar Berg was bought by Nils Arne Eggen to Rosenborg to play with his brother Ørjan in the 1989 season.

In 1992, Berg returned to his mother club Bodø/Glimt then again playing in the 1st division. Bodø/Glimt won the first division and gained promotion for the Norwegian top division. In 1997, Berg returned to Rosenborg. In 1999, Berg made a move to Venezia, playing in the Serie A. The club had financial problems, however, and was relegated. Berg moved back to Norway on loan to Lyn, before returning "home" to Bodø/Glimt in 2001. He announced his retirement in September 2010.

Berg is considered a club legend at Bodø/Glimt. In the 2009 season, when the club had financial problems, Berg played for free. Being the best paid player at the club, Berg did not only give up his ~100,000 euro/year salary, but also started a fund-raiser among local businesses to help save the club. Berg has also earlier donated money to the club, as well as other sport clubs in the area.

In 2012, Berg made a comeback for local amateur side Junkeren.

== International career ==
Berg made his debut for Norway in a January 1994 friendly match against the United States, coming on as a late substitute for Kjetil Rekdal and earned 5 caps, scoring no goals. His final international match was a November 2003 European Championship qualifying match against Spain, again coming on as a late substitute, for Martin Andresen.

== Career statistics ==
As of 17 May 2013

Appearances and goals by club, season and competition
Season	Club	League			Cup		Total	
Season	Club	Division	Apps	Goals	Apps	Goals	Apps	Goals
Rosenborg	1990	Tippeligaen	10	0	0	0	10	0
Tromsø	1991	Tippeligaen	18	2	0	0	18	2
Bodø/Glimt	1992	Adeccoligaen	0	0	0	0	0	0
Bodø/Glimt	1993	Tippeligaen	22	11	0	0	22	11
Bodø/Glimt	1994	Tippeligaen	21	5	0	0	21	5
Bodø/Glimt	1995	Tippeligaen	24	2	0	0	24	2
Bodø/Glimt	1996	Tippeligaen	24	5	0	0	24	5
Rosenborg	1997	Tippeligaen	25	6	0	0	25	6
Rosenborg	1998	Tippeligaen	26	4	3	2	27	4
Rosenborg	1999	Tippeligaen	18	3	4	0	22	3
Venezia	1999–2000	Serie A	28	2	0	0	28	2
Venezia	2000–01	Serie B	2	0	0	0	2	0
Lyn	2001	Tippeligaen	23	3	2	0	25	3
Bodø/Glimt	2002	Tippeligaen	23	5	2	1	25	6
Bodø/Glimt	2003	Tippeligaen	21	8	5	3	26	11
Bodø/Glimt	2004	Tippeligaen	20	4	4	4	24	8
Bodø/Glimt	2005	Tippeligaen	22	6	4	1	26	7
Bodø/Glimt	2006	Adeccoligaen	22	8	2	0	24	8
Bodø/Glimt	2007	Adeccoligaen	29	4	2	0	31	4
Bodø/Glimt	2008	Tippeligaen	25	1	2	0	27	1
Bodø/Glimt	2009	Tippeligaen	24	0	3	0	27	0
Bodø/Glimt	2010	Adeccoligaen	18	5	0	0	18	5
Career total			445	84	33	11	478	95

== Honours ==
Rosenborg

- Norwegian top division: 1990, 1997, 1998, 1999
- Norwegian Cup: 1990, 1999

Bodø/Glimt

- Norwegian Cup: 1993
