= Charles Berstad =

Norwegian footballer and coach (born 1964)

Personal information
- Full name: Einar Charles Berstad
- Date of birth: 29 November 1964 (age 61)
- Height: 1.83 m (6 ft 0 in)
- Position: Defender

Senior career*
Years	Team	Apps	(Gls)
- Disenå
- Skarnes
1983–1992	Kongsvinger	191	(6)
1993–1994	Bodø/Glimt	31	(?)
1995–1998	Kongsvinger	81	(3)
1998–1999	Ikast/Midtjylland		
1999–2000	Ham-Kam	9	(0)
2002	Hamar		

Managerial career
- 2001: Ham-Kam
- 2002: Hamar (playing coach)
- 2003–2004: Fauske/Sprint
- 2007: Nybergsund
- 2008–2009: Mo
- * Club domestic league appearances and goals

Charles Berstad (born 29 November 1964) is a retired Norwegian football player and current coach.

He played for Disenå, Skarnes before playing for Kongsvinger from 1983 to 1992. He then played for Bodø/Glimt from 1993 to 1994, then Kongsvinger again from 1995 to 1998. Berstad has played 303 matches in Tippeligaen, the highest level of football in Norway, and is currently ranked 21st amongst players with the most games played.

He left Kongsvinger and joined Danish club Ikast FS, which in 1999 became FC Midtjylland. He played for Ham-Kam from the summer of 1999 to 2000. He coached Ham-Kam in 2001 before being playing coach of Hamar in 2002. He coached the northern team Fauske/Sprint, then Nybergsund not far from Hamar before signing for another northern team Mo ahead of the 2008 season. He resigned from Mo in July 2009.

== Honours ==
- Norwegian Football Cup: Winner 1993
