= Vegard Strøm =

Norwegian footballer (born 1972)

Personal information
- Date of birth: 30 August 1972 (age 54)
- Height: 1.86 m (6 ft 1 in)
- Position: Defender

Youth career
- –1988: ROS

Senior career*
Years	Team	Apps	(Gls)
1989–1992	ROS		
1993–2003	Strømsgodset		
2004–2006	Mjøndalen		
- * Club domestic league appearances and goals

Vegard Strøm (born 30 August 1972) is a retired Norwegian football defender.

He grew up in the club IL ROS and was drafted into their senior team in 1989. Together with teammate Christer Basma, he trained with Norway U16 and was considered for the 1989 UEFA European Under-16 Championship.

In 1993 he was bought by Strømsgodset for a minor fee, between 20,000 kr and 40,000 kr. In the 1993 Norwegian Football Cup, Strøm scored the second goal in Strømsgodset's semi-final against Fyllingen, which they eventually won 2–1.

In his last Strømsgodset match, in the 2003 1. divisjon, Strøm was substituted off at halftime. The next day, he retired with immediate effect, to the complete surprise of his teammates. Strøm cited a lack of motivation. He played 202 matches for Strømsgodset across all competitions, among those 95 matches in Eliteserien.

In 2004, Strøm joined 3. divisjon side Mjøndalen together with another former Strømsgodset player Thomas Wæhler. Mjøndalen almost immediately faced Strømsgodset in the first round of the 2004 Norwegian Football Cup. Strøm retired in 2007, causing Mjøndalen to look for new defenders.

After retiring he started working in ISS, then Creuna where he became executive of the Denmark branch and CFO. In 2014 he became financial director of Rema 1000.
