= Espen Horsrud =

Norwegian footballer (born 1978)

Personal information
- Date of birth: 27 August 1972 (age 54)
- Position: Right back

Youth career
- Bakke
- Åmot
- 1991: Strømsgodset

Senior career*
Years	Team	Apps	(Gls)
1987–1989	Åmot		
1991–1998	Strømsgodset		
1999–2001	L/F Hønefoss	51	(3)
2002	Mjøndalen		

Managerial career
- 2002–2005: Mjøndalen
- * Club domestic league appearances and goals

Espen Horsrud (born 27 August 1972) is a Norwegian former footballer who played as a right back.

He hails from Knivedalen in Skotselv and started his career in the local club Bakke IF. Horsrud then moved to Åmot IF as a junior player. He also made his senior debut in the lower leagues. He left Åmot after the 1990 season to join the junior team of Strømsgodset. He attended St. Hallvard Upper Secondary School, graduating in 1991.

Horsrud also made his league debut in 1991 against Molde, and was drafted into the senior squad ahead of the 1992 season, as Hallvar Thoresen took over as Strømsgodset manager. In Strømsgodset, he became known for long throw-ins that often became assists to goals. He was a part of the teams that lost both the 1993 Norwegian Football Cup final and the 1997 Norwegian Football Cup final, At the same time, Strømsgodset managed to finish third in the Eliteserien, qualifying for the 1998–99 UEFA Cup. Horsrud started against Hapoel Tel Aviv as Strømsgodset eliminated the Israelis from the second qualifying round.

As the 1998 season was coming to an end, Horsrud's contract was about to expire. He declared himself disappointed with the way Strømsgodset had handled the situation, as well as the club not having valued him enough over the years. Horsrud first travelled to England and trained with Manchester City and Blackpool, both languishing in the Second Division at the time, but ended up joining newly promoted Norwegian First Division team L/F Hønefoss.

In 2001, he underwent groin surgery in the spring. Returning in August, he scored in his first game of the season, but suffered a concussion the next week and therefore only got that one game. In October 2001 he announced that he left Hønefoss to become manager of Mjøndalen. He spent several years here before resigning after the 2005 season, wanting to spend more time with his family. He would contribute as director of sports. In 2006 he also worked briefly as a club developed in Buskerud District of the Football Association.
