= Tom Henning Hovi =

Norwegian footballer (born 1972)

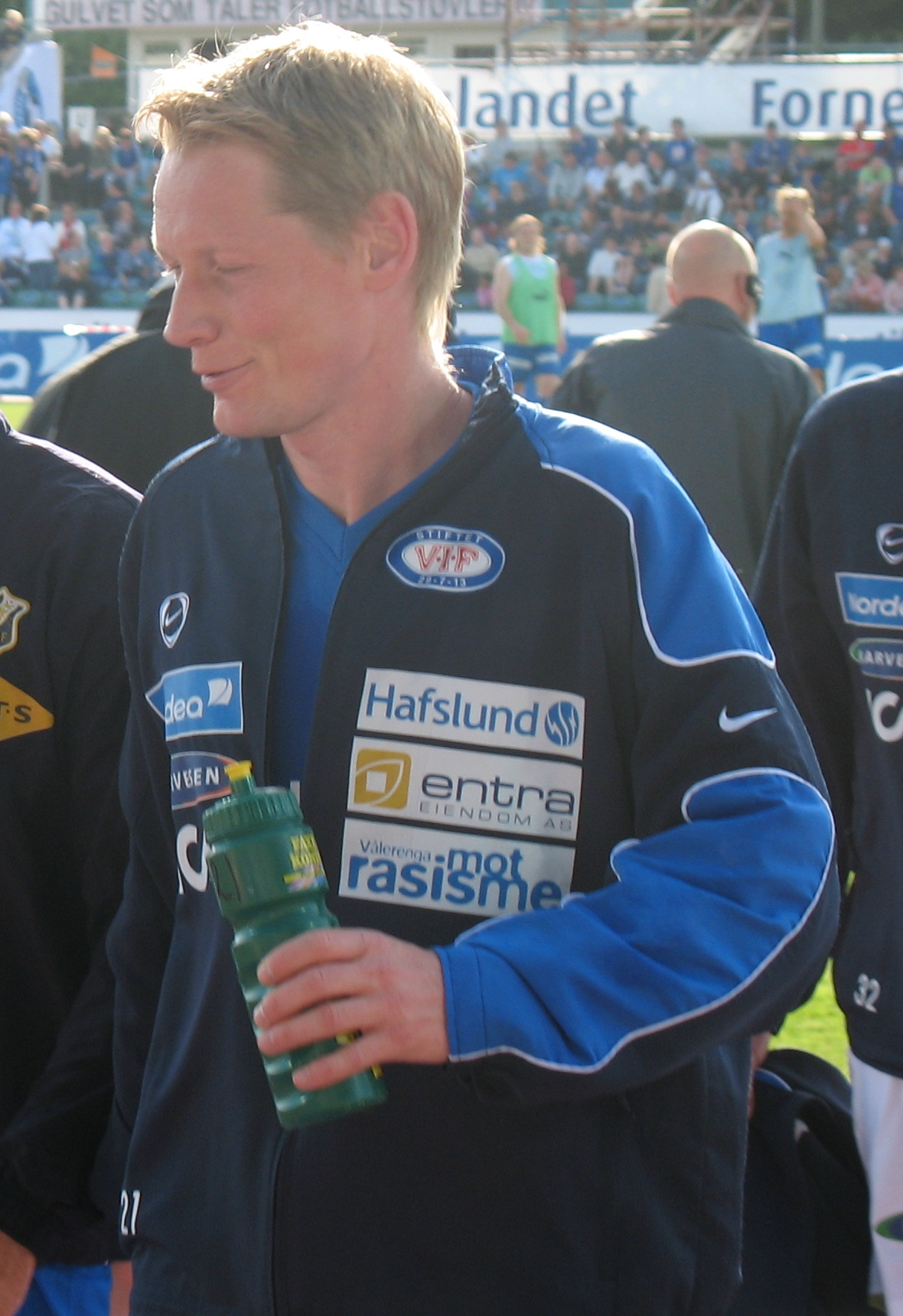
Tom Henning Hovi

Tom Henning Hovi (born 15 January 1972 in Gjøvik) is a Norwegian former football who played as a left back in the club Vålerenga.

His former clubs are Skeid and Ham-Kam. He also had a short stay in Charlton Athletic in 1995.

He retired after the 2006 season.

== Career as a football player ==
(Last updated on 3 May 2007)

Period	Club	Caps	Goals
1992–1995	(Norway) Ham-Kam	72	5
1995	(England) Charlton	2	0
1996–1997	(Norway) Skeid	49	5
1998–2006	(Norway) Vålerenga	197	10
