= Per Terje Markussen =

Norwegian footballer (born 1959)

Personal information
- Date of birth: 1 April 1959 (age 67)
- Position: Forward

Senior career*
| Years | Team | Apps | (Gls) |
| 1977–1992 | Mjøndalen | | |
| 1994 | Mjøndalen | | |

International career
| 1979–1981 | Norway U21 | 8 | (0) |
| 1986–1987 | Norway | 2 | (0) |
- * Club domestic league appearances and goals

Per Terje Markussen (born 1 April 1959) is a retired Norwegian football striker.

He spent his entire career in Mjøndalen, starting in 1977. He retired after Mjøndalen's relegation from the 1992 Eliteserien, but made a comeback in the 1994 1. divisjon. After Mjøndalen dropped yet another tier, he retired. Markussen also represented Norway as an U21 and senior international. He was also capped in bandy.
