= André Nieuwlaat =

Norwegian footballer (born 1965)

Personal information
- Full name: André Leonard Nieuwlaat
- Date of birth: 24 December 1965 (age 60)
- Place of birth: Moss, Norway
- Position: Forward

Senior career*
Years	Team	Apps	(Gls)
- Råde
1982–85	Moss		
1986	Drøbak-Frogn		
1987	Rosenborg	22	(9)
1988	Drøbak-Frogn		
1989	Frigg		
1990	Vålerenga		
1991	Sprint-Jeløy		
1992	Fredrikstad	5	
- Ekholt
- Vansjø/Svinndal
- * Club domestic league appearances and goals

André Leonard Nieuwlaat (born 24 December 1965) is a Norwegian former footballer who played for Råde, Moss (1982–85), Drøbak-Frogn (1986), Rosenborg (1987), Drøbak-Frogn (1988), Frigg (1989), Vålerenga (1990), Sprint-Jeløy (1991), Fredrikstad (1992), Ekholt and Vansjø/Svinndal. Nieuwlaat became top-scorer with nine goals in Rosenborg's 1987 season.
