= Tore André Dahlum =

Norwegian footballer (born 1968)

Totto Dahlum
Personal information
- Full name: Tore André Dahlum
- Date of birth: 21 June 1968 (age 58)
- Place of birth: Kristiansand, Norway
- Height: 1.87 m (6 ft 2 in)
- Position: Forward

Team information
- Current team: Jerv (head coach)

Senior career*
| Years | Team | Apps | (Gls) |
| 1987–1991 | Start | 66 | (33) |
| 1992–1993 | Rosenborg | 42 | (18) |
| 1994–1996 | Start | 66 | (20) |
| 1996–1997 | Skoda Xanthi | 9 | (1) |
| 1997–1999 | Rosenborg | 49 | (19) |
| 1999–2000 | Gent | 13 | (5) |
| 2000–2001 | Aalborg BK | 10 | (2) |
| 2002 | Start | 12 | (5) |
| 2004 | Flekkerøy | 20 | (17) |
| Total | | 287 | (120) |

International career
| 1990–1999 | Norway | 15 | (6) |
- * Club domestic league appearances and goals

Tore André "Totto" Dahlum (born 21 June 1968) is a Norwegian former professional footballer who played as a forward. During his playing career, he had three spells at Start and two spells at Rosenborg. He also played briefly in Denmark, Greece and Belgium.

== Club career ==
Born in Kristiansand, Dahlum's career started with FK Vigør. In 1992, he went on a two-week trial at Manchester United. Dahlum had his best years in the early 1990s. As a member of Start, he became the top goalscorer in the Norwegian top division in 1990, with 20 goals. He also made his international debut the same year.

In 1992, Dahlum was signed by Rosenborg, where he failed to live up to expectations, and was subsequently dropped by both the club and the national team, although he scored the first goal in the 3–2 Norwegian Cup final win against Lillestrøm. After two seasons at the Trondheim club, he returned to Start. Following Start's relegation in 1996, he had a short spell at Greek side Skoda Xanthi, before returning home the following year for a second spell at Rosenborg.

He later played briefly at Belgian club K.A.A. Gent and Danish club AaB, before finishing his professional career in 2001 where it began, for his hometown club Start. He later played a few games in the lower leagues with local Kristiansand club Flekkerøy IL.

After retiring he worked as a commentator for TV 2 before moving into management.

== International career ==
Dahlum made his international debut for the Norway national team in 1990. Overall, he played 15 internationals and scored six goals for Norway. His finest moment at international level was probably the European Championship qualifier against Italy in 1991, where Dahlum scored Norway's first goal in a 2–1 win.

After playing 12 international games from 1990 to 1992, he did not feature again for Norway until 1999, when he made three additional appearances (all as substitute), scoring one goal.

== Managerial career ==
In November 2007 he was announced as the new coach of fourth-tier club FK Jerv.

== Personal life ==
Dahlum is married to Kirsti and has two children, Henrik and Karine. He currently lives in Kristiansand.

== Career statistics ==
Appearances and goals by club, season and competition
| Club | Season | League | | | National Cup | | League Cup | | Europe | | Total | |
| Club | Season | Division | Apps | Goals | Apps | Goals | Apps | Goals | Apps | Goals | Apps | Goals |
|---|---|---|---|---|---|---|---|---|---|---|---|---|
| Start | 1987 | 1. divisjon | 1 | 0 | 0 | 0 | — | | — | | 1 | 0 |
| Start | 1989 | 1. divisjon | 22 | 5 | 0 | 0 | — | | — | | 22 | 5 |
| Start | 1990 | Tippeligaen | 19 | 20 | 0 | 0 | — | | — | | 19 | 20 |
| Start | 1991 | Tippeligaen | 22 | 8 | 0 | 0 | — | | — | | 22 | 8 |
| Start | Total | | 64 | 33 | 0 | 0 | 0 | 0 | 0 | 0 | 64 | 33 |
| Rosenborg | 1992 | Tippeligaen | 22 | 13 | 4 | 5 | — | | — | | 26 | 18 |
| Rosenborg | 1993 | Tippeligaen | 20 | 5 | 2 | 4 | — | | — | | 22 | 9 |
| Rosenborg | Total | | 42 | 18 | 6 | 9 | 0 | 0 | 0 | 0 | 48 | 27 |
| Start | 1994 | Tippeligaen | 17 | 10 | 1 | 1 | — | | — | | 18 | 11 |
| Start | 1995 | Tippeligaen | 26 | 4 | 0 | 0 | — | | — | | 26 | 4 |
| Start | 1996 | Tippeligaen | 23 | 5 | 0 | 0 | — | | — | | 23 | 5 |
| Start | Total | | 66 | 19 | 1 | 1 | 0 | 0 | 0 | 0 | 67 | 20 |
| Skoda Xanthi | 1996–97 | Alpha Ethniki | 9 | 1 | 0 | 0 | — | | — | | 9 | 1 |
| Rosenborg | 1997 | Tippeligaen | 6 | 0 | 0 | 0 | — | | — | | 6 | 0 |
| Rosenborg | 1998 | Tippeligaen | 19 | 5 | 0 | 0 | — | | — | | 19 | 5 |
| Rosenborg | 1999 | Tippeligaen | 24 | 14 | 4 | 2 | — | | — | | 28 | 16 |
| Rosenborg | Total | | 49 | 19 | 4 | 2 | 0 | 0 | 0 | 0 | 53 | 21 |
| Gent | 1999–2000 | Belgian League | 13 | 5 | 0 | 0 | — | | — | | 13 | 5 |
| AaB | 2000–01 | Danish Superliga | 10 | 2 | 0 | 0 | — | | — | | 10 | 2 |
| Start | 2001 | 1. divisjon | 12 | 5 | 2 | 1 | — | | — | | 14 | 6 |
| Career total | | | 265 | 102 | 13 | 13 | 0 | 0 | 0 | 0 | 278 | 115 |

== Honours ==
Rosenborg

- Norwegian top division: 1992, 1993, 1997, 1998, 1999
- Norwegian Cup: 1992, 1999

Individual

- Tippeligaen top scorer: 1990
- Kniksen award: Attacker of the year 1990
