= Kjell Sture Jensen =

Norwegian footballer (born 1968)

Personal information
- Date of birth: 18 June 1968 (age 58)
- Place of birth: Norway
- Height: 1.80 m (5 ft 11 in)
- Position: Striker

Senior career*
Years	Team	Apps	(Gls)
- Årstad
- Fana
- Lillehammer
- Fana
- Bærum
1994	Vålerenga		
- Eik Tønsberg
1996–1998	Haugesund		
1999–2004	Vard		
2005–2008	Vard 2		

Managerial career
- Vard (player-assistant coach)
- 2009–present: Haugesund (coach)
- * Club domestic league appearances and goals

Kjell Sture Jensen (born 18 June 1968) is a Norwegian football coach, football player, and teacher. He is well known for his career in the Norwegian Premier League.

Hailing from Minde in Bergen, he started his career in Årstad IL, and went on to Fana IL. Instead of wages, he received free bus tickets and a discount at the local potato stand, next to the training ground. After a tough and testing year in the Norwegian Armed Forces at Jørstadmoen, during which he played for Lillehammer FK, he returned to Fana. The team notably beat SK Brann in the Norwegian Cup. Jensen later made a decision to leave Bergen for good, and traveled to Sognsvann to study at the Norwegian School of Sport Sciences. During this period he played at Bærum SK, and also got nine games for Vålerenga in the Norwegian Premier League 1994. After a stint in Eik Tønsberg, he joined FK Haugesund in 1996, and enjoyed an amazing spell in the Norwegian Premier League in the seasons 1997 and 1998.

He later joined SK Vard Haugesund, where he doubled as player and assistant coach. He retired as an active player after the 2004 season. However, he remained in the club as market director, and played a couple of games for the clubs B team. In 2009, he was hired as a physical coach in FK Haugesund, and has since played a vital role in their development into a top elite team in the Norwegian Premier League.
