= Thor Mikalsen =

Norwegian footballer (born 1973)

Personal information
- Date of birth: 12 July 1973 (age 53)
- Position: Midfielder

Senior career*
Years	Team	Apps	(Gls)
1989–2000	Bodø/Glimt		
2001	Bryne		
2002–2003	Fauske/Sprint		
2006–2010	Steigen		

International career
1990	Norway u-18	2	(0)
1994–1995	Norway u-21	23	(2)

Managerial career
- 2006–2010: Steigen (player-manager)
- 2024: Junkeren (assistant)
- 2025–: Junkeren
- * Club domestic league appearances and goals

Thor Mikalsen (born 12 July 1973) is a retired Norwegian football midfielder.

He played second-tier football for Bodø/Glimt in 1989, helped win promotion and the 1993 Norwegian Football Cup Final, remaining in Bodø/Glimt throughout 2000. He played the 2001 season in Bryne and then returned north with two seasons in Fauske/Sprint. From 2006 to the summer of 2010 he was player-manager of Steigen.
