= Aasmund Bjørkan =

Norwegian footballer (born 1973)

Personal information
- Full name: Aasmund Karl Bjørkan
- Date of birth: 3 July 1973 (age 53)
- Place of birth: Bodø, Norway
- Height: 1.80 m (5 ft 11 in)
- Position: Midfielder

Senior career*
Years	Team	Apps	(Gls)
1991–2000	Bodø/Glimt	174	(40)
2000–2002	Vålerenga	39	(9)
2002–2005	Bodø/Glimt	69	(10)
Total		282	(59)

Managerial career
- 2009–2010: Alta
- 2011–2012: Ranheim
- 2013–2015: Bodø/Glimt (assistant)
- 2015–2017: Bodø/Glimt
- 2021–2023: Bodø/Glimt (assistant)
- 2026–: Malmö (assistant)
- * Club domestic league appearances and goals

Aasmund Bjørkan (born 3 July 1973) is a Norwegian former professional footballer who was appointed manager at Bodø/Glimt after the 2015 season. He had been the assistant of former manager Jan Halvor Halvorsen since 2013. He has previously been head coach of the First Division sides Alta and Ranheim. As a player, he played as a winger for Bodø/Glimt and Vålerenga, and won the Norwegian Cup in 1993 and 2002.

== Playing career ==
Bjørkan made his debut for Bodø/Glimt in 1991, and helped win promotion ahead of the 1993 season. In his first Norwegian top division season in 1993, he played all 22 league games. He remained a steadfast first-team player at Bodø/Glimt until changing club to Vålerenga in the middle of the 2000 season. After some meagre seasons he returned to Bodø/Glimt in August 2002. He started off well, playing all 26 league games in 2003, but was eventually struck by problems with jumper's knee. He retired as an active player after the 2005 season.

== Post-playing career ==
Ahead of the 2006 season he was offered the job as head coach of Steigen SK. This did not happen; instead he was hired at Bodø/Glimt as a player developer. Ahead of the 2009 season, he was hired as the new head coach for second-tier club Alta IF. After two seasons there Bjørkan moved to become the new head coach for Ranheim from 1 January 2011, where he replaced Per Joar Hansen who took over the Norwegian under-21 team. Bjørkan led the team to a fourth and a seventh place in the First Division, and left the club after the 2012 season when his contract expired.

Bjørkan was linked to the vacant position as head coach of Bodø/Glimt ahead of the 2013 season, but after the club hired Jan Halvor Halvorsen as head coach, he was hired as his assistant coach. When Jan Halvor Halvorsen left Bodø/Glimt after the 2015 season, Bjørkan was appointed head coach. In his first season in charge, Bodø/Glimt was relegated to the 1. divisjon. Bjørkan stayed at the club, Bodø/Glimt won the 2017 1. divisjon with a 16-point margin, and Bjørkan was named the 1. divisjon manager of the year.

== Personal life ==
Bjørkan's son Fredrik André is also a professional footballer, currently playing for Bodø/Glimt as a left-back.

== Career statistics ==
Appearances and goals by club, season and competition
Club	Season	League			Cup		Total	
Club	Season	Division	Apps	Goals	Apps	Goals	Apps	Goals
Bodø/Glimt	1993	Tippeligaen	22	4	0	0	22	4
Bodø/Glimt	1994	Tippeligaen	12	2	0	0	12	2
Bodø/Glimt	1995	Tippeligaen	24	8	0	0	24	8
Bodø/Glimt	1996	Tippeligaen	26	6	0	0	26	6
Bodø/Glimt	1997	Tippeligaen	22	1	0	0	22	1
Bodø/Glimt	1998	Tippeligaen	26	9	0	0	26	9
Bodø/Glimt	1999	Tippeligaen	26	8	3	1	29	9
Bodø/Glimt	2000	Tippeligaen	16	2	1	1	17	3
Bodø/Glimt	Total		174	40	4	2	178	42
Vålerenga	2000	Tippeligaen	5	1	1	1	6	2
Vålerenga	2001	1. divisjon	30	8	1	0	31	8
Vålerenga	2002	Tippeligaen	4	0	0	0	4	0
Vålerenga	Total		39	9	2	1	41	10
Bodø/Glimt	2002	Tippeligaen	5	2	0	0	5	2
Bodø/Glimt	2003	Tippeligaen	26	4	7	2	33	6
Bodø/Glimt	2004	Tippeligaen	23	4	3	1	26	5
Bodø/Glimt	2005	Tippeligaen	15	0	4	2	19	2
Bodø/Glimt	Total		69	10	14	5	83	15
Career total			282	59	20	8	302	67

=== Managerial statistics ===
As of 2 September 2017

Team	From	To	Record					
Team	From	To	G	W	D	L	Win %	Ref.
Alta	1 January 2009	31 December 2010	58	22	12	24	37.93	
Ranheim	1 January 2011	31 December 2012	60	26	17	17	43.33	
Bodø/Glimt	1 January 2016	31 December 2017	51	24	9	18	47.06	
Total			169	72	38	59	42.60	—

== Honours ==
=== As a player ===
Bodø/Glimt

- Norwegian Cup: 1993

Vålerenga

- Norwegian Cup: 2002

=== As a manager ===
Bodø/Glimt

- 1. divisjon: 2017

=== Individual ===
- 1. divisjon Manager of the Year: 2017
