= Bent Inge Johnsen =

Norwegian footballer and manager (born 1972)

Personal information
- Full name: Bent Inge Johnsen
- Date of birth: 28 January 1972 (age 54)
- Place of birth: Mosjøen, Norway
- Height: 1.88 m (6 ft 2 in)
- Positions: Defender; midfielder; forward

Team information
- Current team: Gjelleråsen (manager)

Senior career*
Years	Team	Apps	(Gls)
- Mosjøen
1993–1998	Bodø/Glimt	126	(24)
1998–2002	Rosenborg	65	(8)
2002–2006	Odd	93	(3)
2006	Urædd		

Managerial career
- 2006–2007: Urædd (player-manager)
- 2008–2010: Bodø/Glimt (assistant)
- 2011–2015: Eidsvold Turn
- 2016–2018: Gjelleråsen
- 2019–2021: Lyn
- 2022–: Gjelleråsen
- * Club domestic league appearances and goals

Bent Inge Johnsen (born 28 January 1972) is a Norwegian football player and current coach.

Johnsen was versatile and could play as defender, midfielder and forward.

He started his career with local Mosjøen IL, then joined top-flight team Bodø/Glimt. After 5 years with the club he moved to Norway's top club Rosenborg and made 65 league appearances in 3 years. He then moved to his final club, Odd Grenland and left professional football aged 34.

Johnsen was never capped on any age level, but was an unused substitute for Norway against Trinidad and Tobago in 1995. During his younger days he also played handball for Mosjøen HK and Øyestad IF.

Johnsen took up coaching, first as player-coach of Urædd FK. In 2008 he became assistant manager of Bodø/Glimt, staying for three seasons. He moved to Nittedal and was hired as manager of Eidsvold Turn. After five seasons he took over lowly Gjelleråsen, whom he guided to promotion to the 2018 Norwegian Third Division. He was subsequently hired by ambitious club Lyn, but failed to fulfil the goals of the club. In 2022 he returned to Gjelleråsen.
