= Børre Meinseth =

Norwegian footballer (born 1966)

Personal information
- Date of birth: 24 November 1966 (age 59)
- Place of birth: Ulsteinvik
- Positions: Defender; midfielder

Senior career*
Years	Team	Apps	(Gls)
1984–1986	Hødd		
1987–1990	Bryne		
1991–1996	Viking	123	(24)
1996–1998	Heerenveen		

International career
1984	Norway u-19	6	(0)
1986–1987	Norway u-21	4	(0)
1987–1988	Norway	8	(0)

Managerial career
- 2003: Sola (assistant)
- 2006: Sola
- Sola (youth)
- * Club domestic league appearances and goals

Børre Meinseth (born 24 November 1966) is a retired Norwegian football defender.

He is the uncle of athletes Even Meinseth (1996) and Ingvild Meinseth (1999).

He played for Hødd, Bryne, Viking and Heerenveen and was capped 8 times for Norway.

He settled in Sola Municipality to work as a schoolteacher, and in 2003 he was the assistant coach of Sola FK under Gunnar Aase, in 2006 he was the head coach, then a youth coach.
