= Rohnny Westad =

Norwegian footballer (born 1972)

Personal information
- Full name: Rohnny André Westad
- Date of birth: 12 February 1972 (age 54)
- Place of birth: Trondheim, Norway
- Position: Goalkeeper

Youth career
- Malvik

Senior career*
| Years | Team | Apps | (Gls) |
| 1992 | Rosenborg | | |
| 1993–1997 | Bodø/Glimt | | |
| 1998–1999 | Brann | | |
| 2000–2002 | Bodø/Glimt | | |
- * Club domestic league appearances and goals

Rohnny André Westad (born 12 February 1972) is a Norwegian retired football goalkeeper.

He started his career in Malvik IL, where he started playing goalkeeper by chance. He had one season in the Rosenborg BK squad before going to FK Bodø/Glimt ahead of the 1993 season. He was on the winning team in the Norwegian Football Cup 1993, and on the runner-up team in the Norwegian Football Cup 1996.

Before the 1998 season, he joined SK Brann, but he did not play much in 1999. He returned to Bodø/Glimt after the 1999 season.

He retired after the 2002 season.
