= Tom Kåre Staurvik =

Norwegian football coach (born 1970)

Personal information
- Full name: Tom Kåre Staurvik
- Date of birth: 13 February 1970 (age 56)
- Place of birth: Bodø, Norway
- Height: 1.86 m (6 ft 1 in)
- Position: Centre midfielder

Senior career*
Years	Team	Apps	(Gls)
1993–1994	Bodø/Glimt	44	(14)
1995–1996	Rosenborg	44	(7)
1996–1997	NAC Breda	17	(2)
1997–2002	Bodø/Glimt	89	(18)
2002	Shanghai Shenhua F.C.	4	(0)
2002–2003	GIF Sundsvall	24	(2)
2004	Fauske/Sprint	1	(0)

International career
1993–1994	Norway	2	(0)

Managerial career
- Harstad
- 2012: Bodø/Glimt (assistant coach)
- * Club domestic league appearances and goals

Tom Kåre Staurvik (born 13 February 1970) is a Norwegian football coach, who is working as a player developer for the women's team Grand Bodø. As a player, he won the Norwegian Premier League and the Norwegian Cup several times, in addition to gaining 2 national team caps.

== Career ==
Staurvik had a long active playing career behind him, as a defender and central midfielder, where he played for Bodø/Glimt, Rosenborg, NAC Breda, Shanghai Shenhua F.C., GIF Sundsvall and Fauske/Sprint, before he retired in 2004. After his retirement he had a short spell as playing coach at Harstad in Norwegian Second Division.

Tom Kåre Staurvik was capped two times. He made his debut for Norway in the 7–0 win away against Faroe Islands, when he replaced Erik Mykland at half time.

== Coaching career ==
Staurvik was assistant coach of Bodø/Glimt in the 2012 season. In 2013, he was hired as player developer for the women's team Grand Bodø.

== Honours ==
Bodø/Glimt

- Tippeligaen: Runner-up 1993
- Norwegian Football Cup: Winner 1993

Rosenborg

- Tippeligaen: Winner 1995, Winner 1996
- Norwegian Football Cup: Winner 1995
