= Juro Kuvicek =

Norwegian footballer (born 1967)

Personal information
- Date of birth: 15 December 1967 (age 58)
- Place of birth: Czechoslovakia
- Position: Forward

Senior career*
Years	Team	Apps	(Gls)
- Kongsberg
–1988	Mjøndalen		
1989–1995	Strømsgodset		
1996–1999	Vålerenga		
2000–2002	Oslo Øst		
–2008	Manglerud Star		
2008–?	Kongsberg		
- Sagene
- * Club domestic league appearances and goals

Juro Kuvicek (born 15 December 1967) is a retired Norwegian football striker.

He migrated with his family from Czechoslovakia to Norway in 1974. Settling in Kongsberg, he went via Mjøndalen IF to Strømsgodset IF. In his Strømsgodset career from 1989 throughout 1995 he won the 1991 Norwegian Football Cup Final and lost the 1993 Norwegian Football Cup Final.

From 1996 to 1999 he played for Vålerenga. In 1996 Vålerenga was deducted three points for fielding Kuvicek while ineligible, and were relegated. The next season they were re-promoted and won the 1997 Norwegian Football Cup Final. Kuvicek was an unused substitute, but became cup champion anyway because of outings in prior rounds.

From 2000 through 2002 he played for FK Oslo Øst. He was later player-manager of the club, now playing under the old name Manglerud Star. In 2008 he was released and joined his childhood club Kongsberg IF. Well past his 40th birthday, in the 2010s he featured for Sagene IF.
