= Ola Haldorsen =

Norwegian footballer and manager (born 1965)

Personal information
- Date of birth: 29 April 1965 (age 61)
- Position: Defender

Youth career
- Bølgen

Senior career*
Years	Team	Apps	(Gls)
1983–1988	Bodø/Glimt		
1989–1990	Moss		
1991–1998	Bodø/Glimt		
- Bølgen

International career
1981	Norway u-17	1	(0)

Managerial career
- 2005: Bodø/Glimt
- * Club domestic league appearances and goals

Ola Haldorsen (born 29 April 1965) is a retired Norwegian football defender.

He came through the ranks of IL Bølgen and representer Norway once as a youth international. In 1988 he moved to Halden to study at Østfold District College, and played football for Moss FK from 1989. He returned to Bodø/Glimt in 1991, remaining there throughout 1998 and winning the 1993 Norwegian Football Cup Final.

He was appointed head coach in 2005 on a two-year contract, but was sacked after the 2005 season.
