= Tom Gulbrandsen =

Norwegian footballer and manager (born 1964)

Personal information
- Date of birth: 5 May 1964 (age 62)
- Height: 1.75 m (5 ft 9 in)
- Position: Midfielder

Senior career*
Years	Team	Apps	(Gls)
–1984	Geithus		
1985–1987	Mjøndalen	65	(13)
1988–1997	Lillestrøm	221	(46)
1996	→ SV Ried (loan)		
1998–2003	Hønefoss		
2004–2007	Mjøndalen		

International career
1985–1987	Norway U21	8	(2)
1987–1990	Norway	17	(0)

Managerial career
- 2007–2010: Lillestrøm (developer)
- 2010: Hønefoss
- 2016–: Hønefoss (managing director)
- 2019–: Skjetten
- * Club domestic league appearances and goals

Tom Gulbrandsen (born 5 May 1964) is a retired Norwegian football midfielder and later manager.

He is the father of Fredrik Gulbrandsen.
