= Øivind Husby =

Norwegian footballer (born 1960)

Personal information
- Date of birth: 3 August 1960 (age 66)
- Position: Forward

Senior career*
| Years | Team | Apps | (Gls) |
- Rosenborg
| 1984–1985 | Granada | | |
| 1985 | Moss | 10 | (5) |
| 1986–1988 | Vålerenga | 56 | (9) |
| 1989–1992 | Rosenborg | 65 | (1) |

International career
| 1977 | Norway U16 | 2 | (0) |
| 1978–1979 | Norway U19 | 6 | (0) |
| 1980–1981 | Norway U21 | 15 | (1) |
| 1987 | Norway | 2 | (0) |
- * Club domestic league appearances and goals

Øivind Husby (born 3 August 1960) is a Norwegian footballer. He played in two matches for the Norway national football team in 1987. He played in Spain for Granada CF.
