= Petter Solli =

Norwegian footballer (born 1966)

Personal information
- Full name: Petter Rikard Solli
- Date of birth: 22 April 1966 (age 60)
- Position: Defender

Senior career*
Years	Team	Apps	(Gls)
1986–1995	Bodø/Glimt		
1996–1997	Moss	52	(2)
1998–1999	Trelleborg		
2000–2005	Lofoten		
2006–	Svolvær		

Managerial career
- 2000–2005: Lofoten
- 2006–: Svolvær
- * Club domestic league appearances and goals

Petter Solli (born 22 April 1966) is a retired Norwegian football defender.

Hailing from Ørnes, he played ten seasons for FK Bodø/Glimt and became cup champion in 1993.

He spent the years 1996 and 1997 in Moss FK, then 1998 and 1999 in Sweden's Trelleborgs FF. In 2000 he became player-manager of FK Lofoten, continuing as such in Svolvær IL from 2006.
