= FK Gevir Bodø =

Norwegian football club

- Full name: Fotballklubben Gevir Bodø
- Founded: 1977
- League: none

Fotballklubben Gevir Bodø ("Gevir" means antler) was a Norwegian association football club from Bodø, Nordland.

The men's football team last played in the Norwegian Second Division in 1999. After the 2000 season it contested playoffs to win re-promotion, but failed. Ten years later the club did not field any senior team, only one veteran's team.
