= 2001 Norwegian Football Cup final =

- Event: 2001 Norwegian Football Cup
Bryne	Viking
0	3
- Date: 4 November 2001
- Venue: Ullevaal Stadion, Oslo
- Referee: Kjell Alseth
- Attendance: 25,823

The 2001 Norwegian Football Cup final was the final match of the 2001 Norwegian Football Cup, the 96th season of the Norwegian Football Cup, the premier Norwegian football cup competition organized by the Football Association of Norway (NFF). The match was played on 4 November 2001 at the Ullevaal Stadion in Oslo, and opposed two Tippeligaen sides Bryne and Viking. Viking defeated Bryne 3–0 to claim the Norwegian Cup for a fifth time in their history. Despite the victory, the Viking's players reported for training at 2 p.m. the next day.

== Route to the final ==
Bryne			Round	Viking		
Rosseland	A	3–0	Round 1	Staal	A	6–0
Fyllingen	A	4–3	Round 2	Vindbjart	A	6–1
Skeid	A	2–1	Round 3	Vidar	H	5–0
Molde	H	3–2	Round 4	Bodø/Glimt	A	3–1
Vålerenga	H	3–2	Quarterfinal	Tromsø	H	1–0
Lillestrøm	H	4–0	Semifinal	Odd Grenland	H	2–0

== Match ==
=== Details ===
4 November 2001
13:15 CET (UTC+1)

Bryne	0–3	Viking
	Report	Eskeland 5' (o.g.); Berre 56'; Tihinen 71'

Ullevaal Stadion, Oslo
Attendance: 25,823
Referee: Kjell Alseth (Stjørdals/Blink)

Bryne	Viking

Bryne:
GK	1	(Norway) Roger Eskeland (c)
DF	17	(Sweden) Anders Friberg	(yellow card) 62'	(substituted off) 72'
DF	3	(Sweden) Marcus Andreasson
DF	19	(Norway) Knut Henry Haraldsen
DF	5	(Norway) Ole Hjelmhaug
MF	18	(Norway) Pål Håpnes
MF	7	(Sweden) Jonas Jonsson
MF	10	(Norway) Lasse Strand		(substituted off) 64'
FW	16	(Norway) Kai-Ove Stokkeland		(substituted off) 58'
FW	11	(Sweden) Pierre Gallo
FW	26	(Sweden) Dejan Pavlovic
Substitutions:
GK	12	(Norway) Svein Bø
FW	6	(Norway) Geir Atle Undheim		(substituted in) 64'
FW	8	(Norway) Rune Medalen
DF	15	(Norway) Einar Braut
MF	19	(Norway) Trond Bjørnsen
MF	20	(Norway) Kenneth Giske		(substituted in) 58'
MF	23	(Sweden) Peter Olofsson		(substituted in) 72'
Coach:
(Sweden) Reine Almqvist

Viking:
GK	1	(Denmark) Bo Andersen
DF	3	(Norway) Bjørn Dahl
DF	4	(Finland) Hannu Tihinen
DF	20	(Finland) Toni Kuivasto
DF	5	(Norway) Thomas Pereira (c)
MF	18	(Norway) Tom Sanne	(substituted off) 82'
MF	15	(Norway) Trygve Nygaard
MF	19	(Norway) Brede Hangeland
MF	11	(Norway) Morten Berre
FW	10	(Norway) Jørgen Tengesdal	(substituted off) 84'
FW	16	(Norway) Erik Nevland	(substituted off) 79'
Substitutions:
GK	1	(Norway) Tore Snørteland
MF	6	(Norway) Bjarte Lunde Aarsheim	(substituted in) 84'
FW	8	(Norway) Bjørn Berland	(substituted in) 79'
FW	9	(England) Ben Wright
MF	14	(Norway) Leif Gunnar Smerud
DF	17	(Norway) Kristian Sørli	(substituted in) 82'
FW	21	(Norway) Trond Heggestad
Coach:
(Sweden) Benny Lennartsson
