= 1998 Norwegian Football Cup final =

- Event: 1998 Norwegian Football Cup
Stabæk	Rosenborg
3	1
- After extra time
- Date: 1 November 1998
- Venue: Ullevaal Stadion, Oslo
- Referee: Rune Pedersen
- Attendance: 23,251

The 1998 Norwegian Football Cup final was the final match of the 1998 Norwegian Football Cup, the 93rd season of the Norwegian Football Cup, the premier Norwegian football cup competition organized by the Football Association of Norway (NFF). The match was played on 1 November 1998 at the Ullevaal Stadion in Oslo, and opposed two Tippeligaen sides Stabæk and Rosenborg. Stabæk defeated Rosenborg 3–1 after extra time to claim the Norwegian Cup for a first time in their history.

== Route to the final ==
Stabæk			Round	Rosenborg		
Aalesund	H	1–0	Round 3	Sarpsborg	A	5–0
Kongsvinger	A	3–1 aet	Round 4	Strømsgodset	A	4–1
Skeid	H	3–1	Quarterfinal	Bryne	H	5–0
Moss	H	0–0 (3–1 p)	Semifinal	Brann	A	3–2

== Match ==
=== Details ===
1 November 1998
13:15 CET (UTC+1)

Stabæk	3–1 (a.e.t.)	Rosenborg
Sigurðsson 6', 106'; Finstad 98'	Report	Rushfeldt 65' (pen.)

Ullevaal Stadion, Oslo
Attendance: 23,251
Referee: Rune Pedersen (Sprint/Jeløy)

Stabæk	Rosenborg

Stabæk:
GK	(Norway) Frode Olsen
DF	(Norway) André Flem	(yellow card) 104'
DF	(Norway) Inge André Olsen		(substituted off) 116'
DF	(Norway) John Arvid Skistad
DF	(Norway) Christian Holter
MF	(Sweden) Jesper Jansson	(yellow card) 83'
MF	(Norway) Martin Andresen
MF	(Norway) Tommy Svindal Larsen		(substituted off) 119'
MF	(Norway) Tommy Stenersen	(yellow card) 49'	(substituted off) 91'
FW	(Norway) Petter Belsvik
FW	(Iceland) Helgi Sigurðsson
Substitutions:
DF	(Sweden) Niclas Svensson		(substituted in) 116'
MF	(Norway) Andreas Hauger		(substituted in) 119'
MF	(Ghana) Richard Ackon
MF	(Norway) Axel Kolle
FW	(Norway) Thomas Finstad		(substituted in) 91'
Coach:
(Sweden) Anders Linderoth

Rosenborg:
GK	(Norway) Jørn Jamtfall
DF	(Norway) Erik Hoftun
DF	(Norway) Christer Basma	(yellow card) 20'
DF	(Norway) Bjørn Otto Bragstad
DF	(Norway) André Bergdølmo
MF	(Norway) Roar Strand		(substituted off) 82'
MF	(Norway) Bent Skammelsrud
MF	(Norway) Runar Berg
FW	(Norway) Børge Hernes		(substituted off) 60'
FW	(Norway) Sigurd Rushfeldt
FW	(Norway) Mini Jakobsen		(substituted off) 102'
Substitutions:
MF	(Norway) Fredrik Winsnes		(substituted in) 82'
MF	(Norway) Jan-Derek Sørensen		(substituted in) 102'
FW	(Norway) Tore André Dahlum		(substituted in) 60'
Coach:
(Norway) Trond Sollied
