= Stord IL =

Sports club in Norway

Stord Idrettslag
- Founded: 30 March 1914; 112 years ago
- Based in: Stord, Norway
- Stadium: Stord Stadion (association football); Stordhallen (basketball, handball, volleyball); Stord Svømmehall (swimming); Vikahaugane kunstisbane (speed skating)
- Colours: White; Black
- Website: http://www.stordil.no/

Stord Idrettslag is a sports club located in Stord Municipality, Norway. The club was founded as Stord Turn og idrettslag (Stord T&IL) on 30 March 1914, and today it has sections for athletics, basketball, gymnastics, handball, football, orienteering, volleyball, skiing, speed skating and swimming. The club formerly had a section for wrestling.

== History ==
The club was founded on 30 March 1914 as Stord Turn og idrettslag. In 2001, this name was changed to the current name, Stord Idrettslag.

== Football ==
Stord Fotball
- Full name: Stord Idrettslag
- Founded: 30 March 1914; 112 years ago
- Ground: Stord Stadion
- Capacity: 200
- Chairman: Nina Sleen
- Head coach: Robin Øvrevik
- League: 3. divisjon, group 3
- 2025: 3. divisjon, group 5, 7th of 14
- Website: http://www.stordfotball.no/
Home colours	Away colours

=== History ===
The men's football team currently plays in 3. divisjon, the fourth tier of the Norwegian football league system. They played in the second tier for two consecutive seasons in 1989 and 1990.

==== Stord/Moster and Stord Sunnhordland FK (2002–2006) ====
In 2002, Stord's senior team merged with Moster IL and created Stord/Moster. The goal for the merger was to create a new elite team which could have wider support inn the Sunnhordland region. Stord/Moster won the 2003 3. divisjon, but lost to Norheimsund IL in the playoff to the 2. divisjon.

In 2006, the club got new owners and changed its name from Stord/Moster to Stord Sunnhordland on 15 March 2006. In December 2006, it was decided to discontinue the club. Its spot in the league system and its squad was transferred back to Stord IL. The chairman of the new limited company Sunnhordland Toppfotball, which now supported the club, said that Stord Sunnhordland had "been a club without soul".

==== Recent years (2007–present) ====
In the 2013 season, Stord Fotball promoted to the third tier, but were relegated back to the fourth tier in the following season. They repeated this feat in 2015 through winning their group in the 2015 3. divisjon, but a twelfth-place finish in the 2016 2. divisjon saw Stord relegate back to the 3. divisjon, where they currently plays.

==== Recent men's football seasons ====
Season		Pos.	Pl.	W	D	L	GS	GA	P	Cup	Notes	Ref.
2013	3. divisjon	↑ 1	26	16	6	4	80	33	54	Second qualifying round	Promoted to 2. divisjon	
2014	2. divisjon	↓ 13	26	7	6	13	43	62	27	Second round	Relegated to 3. divisjon	
2015	3. divisjon	↑ 1	26	16	5	5	76	37	53	First round	Promoted to 2. divisjon	
2016	2. divisjon	↓ 12	26	6	6	14	36	65	24	First round	Relegated to 3. divisjon	
2017	3. divisjon	10	26	8	6	12	48	58	30	First round		
2018	3. divisjon	10	26	8	6	12	51	62	30	First qualifying round		
2019	3. divisjon	6	26	12	4	10	70	48	40	Second qualifying round		
2020	Season cancelled											
2021	3. divisjon	11	13	4	3	6	30	35	15	Second round		
2022	3. divisjon	9	26	11	2	13	62	70	35	Second qualifying round		
2023	3. divisjon	6	26	11	6	9	48	46	39	Second round		
2024	3. divisjon	10	26	8	4	14	59	74	28	Second round		
2025	3. divisjon	7	26	12	6	8	58	54	42	First qualifying round		

=== Current squad ===
As of 28 January 2026

Note: Flags indicate national team as defined under FIFA eligibility rules; some limited exceptions apply. Players may hold more than one non-FIFA nationality.

No.	Pos.	Nation	Player
1	GK	NOR	Levent Smakiqi
3	FW	NOR	Jonas Lindeflaten Zanetti
4	DF	NOR	Stian Habbestad Ytrøy
5	DF	NOR	Lennart Andal
6	FW	NOR	Kristian Magnussen
7	MF	NOR	Eirik Træet
8	MF	NOR	Mathias Løtveit Jørgensen
9	MF	NOR	Oliver Huse
10	FW	NOR	Lars Vidar Dale Valvatne
11	FW	NOR	Jonas Hilt Stoknes
12	GK	NOR	Tord Nøtland Belt
13	DF	NOR	Jonas Habbestad Gjerde
14	DF	NOR	Albert Sjo Hystad
15	FW	NOR	Odin Andre Lunde Stensletten
16	MF	NOR	Sverre Skjold Olsen

No.	Pos.	Nation	Player
17	DF	NOR	Timian Bjergby Lønning
18	FW	NOR	Nicklas Brady-Vikene
19	FW	NOR	Håvard Handeland
20	FW	NOR	Sondre Soma Ersland
21	DF	NOR	Leander Wilhelmsen Reigstad
22	MF	NOR	Jonas Rikstad Halvorsen
23	MF	NOR	Halvor Livastøl Aga
24	DF	NOR	Jonas Våmartveit Børtveit
25	DF	NOR	Johannes Kyvik Skard
26	GK	NOR	John Andre Njåstad
27	FW	NOR	Roger Blokhus Ekeland
28	DF	NOR	Brage Røtnes Nielsen
30	FW	NOR	Heine Nysæther Storevik
33	GK	NOR	Eskil Sælevik Fjose

=== Notable former players ===
- (Norway) Torbjørn Agdestein
- (Norway) Christian Brink
- (Norway) Øyvind Mellemstrand
- (Canada) Kevin De Serpa
- (Norway) Vegard Hansen
- (Norway) Kjetil Løvvik
- (Sweden) Jonas Jonsson

== Handball ==
The men's team in Stord Handball currently plays in the third tier of Norwegian handball. The team played twelve consecutive seasons in the top flight before they were relegated from the 2010–11 season.
