= 1998 Norwegian Football Cup =

Norgesmesterskapet i fotball for herrer

Tournament details
- Country: Norway
- Teams: 85 (main competition)

Final positions
- Champions: Stabæk (1st title)
- Runners-up: Rosenborg

Tournament statistics
- Top goal scorer: Sigurd Rushfeldt (5)

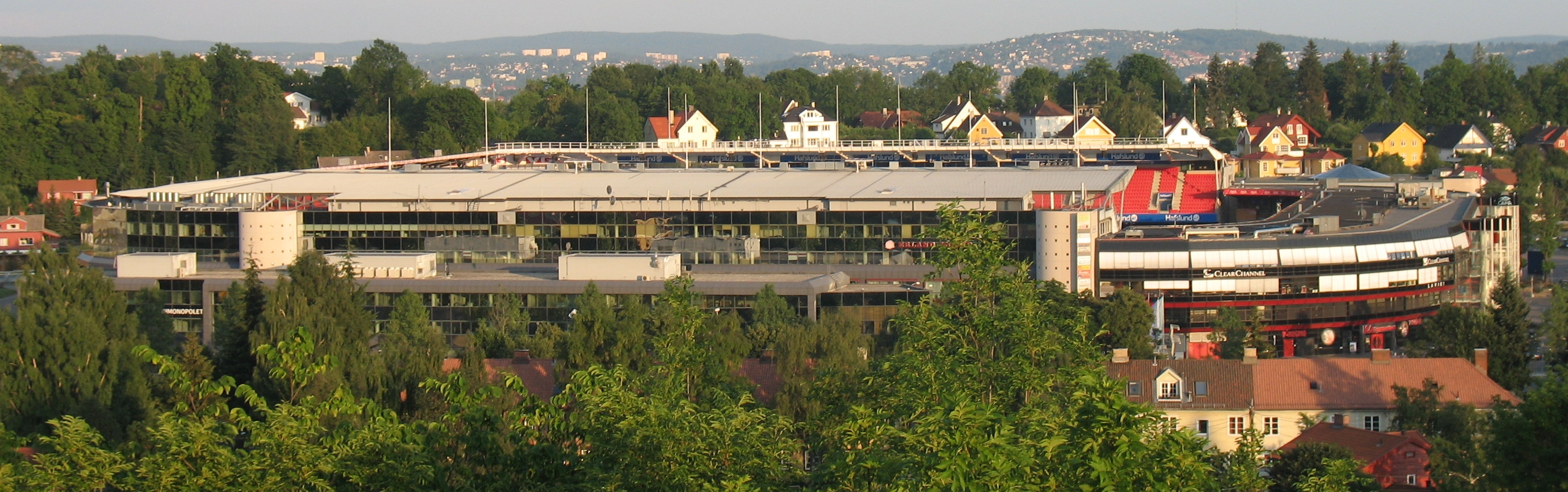
Ullevaal Stadion, Oslo - venue for the Norwegian Cup final

The 1998 Norwegian Football Cup was the 93rd edition of the Norwegian Football Cup and was won by Stabæk after defeating Rosenborg in the final at Ullevaal Stadion on 1 November.

Because of Norway's participation in the 1998 FIFA World Cup, the clubs playing in Tippeligaen entered the competition in the third round.

== Calendar ==
Below are the dates for each round as given by the official schedule:

Round	Date(s)	Number of fixtures	Clubs	New entries this round
First Round	21–23 April 1998	35	85 → 50	70: 16th–85th
Second Round	13 May 1998	18	50 → 32	1: 15th
Third Round	3–4 June 1998	16	32 → 16	14: 1st–14th
Fourth Round	15–16 July 1998	8	16 → 8	none
Quarter-finals	5 August 1998	4	8 → 4	none
Semi-finals	23 September 1998	2	4 → 2	none
Final	1 November 1998	1	2 → 1	none

== First round ==
Team 1	Score	Team 2
21 April 1998
Vidar	2–0 (a.e.t.)	Sandnes FK
Førde	4–3	Jotun
Steinkjer	2–3	Nardo
22 April 1998
Sarpsborg FK	3–2	Råde
Drøbak/Frogn	0–4	Fredrikstad
Eidsvold Turn	2–3	Raufoss
Fossum	1–1 (3–1 p)	Jevnake
Ski	1–3	Strømmen
Birkebeineren	0–2	Skeid
Storm	0–4	Eik-Tønsberg
Lyngdal	1–2	Start
Kopervik	0–3	Bryne
Ny-Krohnborg	1–3	Fana
Os	1–1 (3–4 p)	Vard Haugesund
Åsane	3–1	Fyllingen
Stryn	2–2 (7–6 p)	Hødd
Velledalen/Ringen	0–5	Aalesund
Clausenengen	5–0	Træff
Tromsdalen	4–3 (a.e.t.)	Finnsnes
Skjervøy	1–4	Alta
23 April 1998
Holter	0–3	Ullern
Abildsø	3–5	Lyn
Grei	0–2	Kjelsås
Bærum	5–1	Mjøndalen
Tynset	1–2 (a.e.t.)	HamKam
Faaberg	3–1	Elverum
Liv/Fossekallen	0–1	Runar
Ørn-Horten	0–1	Pors Grenland
Tollnes	1–2	Odd Grenland
Mandalskameratene	2–1	Jerv
Ålgård	1–0	Sola
Ranheim	0–1	Stjørdals-Blink
Namsos	1–4	Strindheim
Lofoten	4–2	Gevir Bodø
Harstad	1–0	Stålkameratene

- Byåsen had a walkover.

== Second round ==
Team 1	Score	Team 2
13 May 1998
Fredrikstad	0–1	Kjelsås
Strømmen	1–4	HamKam
Ullern	1–4	Sarpsborg FK
Lyn	6–0	Bærum
Raufoss	2–0	Faaberg
Eik-Tønsberg	9–1	Fossum
Runar	1–2	Skeid
Pors Grenland	1–2	Start
Mandalskameratene	0–0 (6–7 p)	Odd Grenland
Vard Haugesund	2–3	Vidar
Bryne	3–0	Ålgård
Fana	2–2 (17–16 p)	Åsane
Stryn	2–2 (5–4 p)	Førde
Aalesund	4–1	Clausenengen
Nardo	0–1	Byåsen
Stjørdals-Blink	0–6	Strindheim
Lofoten	0–2	Tromsdalen
Alta	1–2	Harstad

== Third round ==
Team 1	Score	Team 2
3 June 1998
Sarpsborg FK	0–5	Rosenborg
Vålerenga	1–3	Skeid
Start	1–3	Strømsgodset
Fana	2–4	Molde
Stryn	0–1	Brann
Harstad	1–4	Bodø/Glimt
4 June 1998
Moss	2–0	Eik-Tønsberg
Kjelsås	0–2	Haugesund
Stabæk	1–0	Aalesund
HamKam	4–3 (a.e.t.)	Sogndal
Kongsvinger	2–1	Raufoss
Odd Grenland	1–2	Bryne
Vidar	0–1	Viking
Strindheim	3–3 (4–3 p)	Lillestrøm
Byåsen	2–1	Lyn
Tromsdalen	0–10	Tromsø

== Fourth round ==
15 July 1998

HamKam	0–1 (a.e.t.)	Moss
		Ramberg 98'

Briskeby gressbane, Hamar
Attendance: 1,181
Referee: Frode Kvam

15 July 1998

Bryne	4–2	Tromsø
Medalen 21', 23', 32'; Mörk 44'		Guðmundsson 38'; Lange 40'

Bryne Stadion, Bryne
Attendance: 1,084
Referee: Tommy Skjerven

15 July 1998

Bodø/Glimt	1–0	Strindheim
Bergersen 68'

Aspmyra Stadion, Bodø
Attendance: 1,181
Referee: Johnny Ditlefsen

15 July 1998

Skeid	4–1 (a.e.t.)	Haugesund
Steffensen 83'; Grinna 96'; Halvorsen 99', 115'		Jacobsen 25'

Voldsløkka Stadion, Oslo
Attendance: 385
Referee: Arlid Haugstad

15 July 1998

Brann	3–1	Byåsen
Løvvik 7', 85'; Bakkerud 89'		Sørum 83'

Brann Stadion, Bergen
Attendance: 2,057
Referee: Jon Skjervold

15 July 1998

Kongsvinger	1–3 (a.e.t.)	Stabæk
Ernstsson 17' (pen.)		Belsvik 77'; Kolle 107', 112' (pen.)

Gjemselund Stadion, Kongsvinger
Attendance: 1,046
Referee: Terje Hauge

16 July 1998

Molde	2–1	Viking
Hestad 3' (pen.), 29' (pen.)		Kristensen 11'

Molde Stadion, Molde
Attendance: 6,488
Referee: Roy Helge Olsen

16 July 1998

Strømsgodset	1–4	Rosenborg
Hagen 27'		Sørensen 22', 90'; Berg 72'; Bergdølmo 83' (pen.)

Marienlyst Stadion, Drammen
Attendance: 5,691
Referee: Tom Henning Øvrebø

== Quarter-finals ==
5 August 1998

Rosenborg	5–0	Bryne
Strand 7'; Jakobsen 21'; Dahlum 75', 76'; Johnsen 86'

Lerkendal Stadion, Trondheim
Attendance: 8,646
Referee: Jon Skjervold

5 August 1998

Moss	2–1	Bodø/Glimt
Enerly 2'; Løvlien 3'		Berg 76'

Melløs Stadion, Moss
Attendance: 1,951
Referee: Tom Henning Øvrebø

5 August 1998

Stabæk	3–1	Skeid
Belsvik 24'; Olsen 43'; Kolle 76'		Halvorsen 84'

Bislett Stadion, Oslo
Attendance: 2,029
Referee: Johnny Ditlefsen

8 September 1998

Brann	4–0	Molde
Helstad 6', 75'; Ludvigsen 70'; Løvvik 73'

Brann Stadion, Bergen
Attendance: 6,504
Referee: Rune Pedersen

== Semi-finals ==
23 September 1998

Brann	2–3	Rosenborg
Løvvik 44' (pen.); Jamtfall 74' (o.g.)		Rushfeldt 38', 59'; Skammelsrud 85'

Brann Stadion, Bergen
Attendance: 14,071
Referee: Roy Helge Olsen

23 September 1998

Moss	0–0 (a.e.t.)	Stabæk
Penalties
Månsson (penalty missed); Sylte (penalty scored); Andersen (penalty missed); Hansen (penalty missed)	1–3	(penalty missed) Belsvik; (penalty scored) Larsen; (penalty scored) Holter; (penalty scored) Andresen

Melløs Stadion, Moss
Attendance: 3,160
Referee: Terje Hauge

== Final ==
1 November 1998
13:15 CET (UTC+1)

Stabæk	3–1 (a.e.t.)	Rosenborg
Sigurðsson 6', 106'; Finstad 98'	Report	Rushfeldt 65' (pen.)

Ullevaal Stadion, Oslo
Attendance: 23,251
Referee: Rune Pedersen (Sprint/Jeløy)
