= Stord Sunnhordland FK =

Norwegian football club

Stord Sunnhordland
- Full name: Stord Sunnhordland Fotballklubb
- Founded: 18 December 2002
- Dissolved: 2006
- Ground: Stord stadion, Stord
Home colours	Away colours

Stord Sunnhordland Fotballklubb (formerly known as Stord/Moster Fotballklubb) was an association football club located in Leirvik, Stord Municipality, Norway. It was founded in late 2002 as a cooperation between the football sections of Leirvik's local multi-sports club Stord IL and lower-division Moster IL. The club was named Stord/Moster FK until 2006. Two investors, football agent Terje Simonsen and professional footballer Kjetil Løvvik, were behind the merger. It was founded to create one large club in the Sunnhordland region, to attract support behind the club. Critics claimed that the investors were mainly looking to develop players to sell for cash. Top goalscorer the first season was Kjetil Løvvik himself, who quit a professional career to play for the club. Stord/Moster fared well on the football field; they won their Third Division group twice in a row, and on the second occasion they gained promotion through the playoff. They then played two seasons in the Second Division. Their biggest talent was Christian Brink who went on to higher levels of football.

From the start, the club witnessed instability in the coaching situation. In its third attempt to get a long-serving coach the club succeeded, but Kristinn Atlason was swapped for player-coach Vegard Hansen ahead of the 2004 season. He left in 2005 after the club failed to pay him; the same thing happened to his successor Jonas Jonsson. The club then went through two more coaches and had just hired another when becoming defunct. The financial situation was dire throughout the club's existence, despite investments from Simonsen and Løvvik, and culminated in the lack of pay in 2005 and early 2006. Especially the sponsor attraction was lower than some had predicted. An attempt in 2006 to change ownership and club name did not help enough, and the club was even relegated. After this it was decided to give up, and to revert to the mother club Stord IL; the chairman of the club owners explained that Stord Sunnhordland had "been a club without soul".

== History ==
=== Stord/Moster ===
It was initiated by football agent Terje Simonsen (from Moster) and professional footballer Kjetil Løvvik. They invested 1,000,000 kr in a new club, with Simonsen owning 51% and Løvvik 49%. The merger between the senior teams of Stord IL (Third Division) and Moster IL (Fourth Division) was a five-year plan to relegate to 1. divisjon, and farm out players to other clubs. Stord was to be designated the league playing team, and Moster the reserve team to play at the Moster home field. The goal had a failed conceptual predecessor with Stord IL, IL Trott and IL Solid. Simonsen was criticized for focusing too much on profit. In November 2002 the extraordinary annual convention of Stord's football section approved the plans, The club was founded on 18 December 2002. The chairman of the board was Kristian Innvær, and the head coach was Magnar Aaland. He resigned in pre-season in February 2003. Assistants Eivind Egeland and Øystein Djuve were the replacements. Egeland soon resigned to pursue a non-football career in Hommersåk. Soon after the Icelander Kristinn Atlason was hired as head coach. When both Djuve, the physical coach Tore Hammer and the two junior team coaches Jørgen Hammersland and Tore Atle Sørheim resigned in April, Simonsen himself took over as junior team coach.

On the other hand, Kjetil Løvvik ceased his professional career to play for Stord/Moster. He lived in Oslo, but flew to Stord to play matches and became a prolific goalscorer. Stord/Moster won the league, but lost to Norheimsund IL in the playoff to the Second Division. In the 2003 Norwegian Football Cup they were defeated in the first preliminary round by SK Nord. Financially, the club witnessed a deficit in 2003 (while the club Stord IL actually profited from losing its senior team). Kristinn Atlason wanted to continue as coach, but was replaced by Vegard Hansen. The former Bristol City and Strømsgodset defender also played matches.

The 2004 season went well in that Stord/Moster won the league again, despite that 2003's top goalscorer Kjetil Løvvik played less. In the playoff to the Second Division it beat Nest-Sotra 3–2 on aggregate, and won promotion. This was a revenge after Nest-Sotra eliminated Stord/Moster in the first preliminary round of the 2004 Norwegian Football Cup. The new goal of the club, according to majority owner Simonsen, was to reach the upper echelon of the Second Division within 2007. The club's reserves team also won promotion, to the Third Division. However, the club still had financial issues. The running expenses showed a deficit of NOK 477,000 in 2003 and NOK 819,000 in 2004. In 2005, the new chairman Geir Ove Sele pondered that the club's goals for 2005, among others an average attendance of 1000 on home matches, as well as the perceived willingness of sponsors to support the team, might be unrealistic.

Ahead of the 2005 season Kjetil Løvvik had retired. The biggest signing was Jonas Jonsson from SK Brann. Tips for the 2005 league outcome came from newspapers such as Fædrelandsvennen and Bergens Tidende. Fædrelandsvennen tipped a fourteenth place (and relegation) for Stord/Moster, and Bergens Tidende tipped a thirteenth place. The first match ended with 1–1 against Klepp IL, the goal scored by 2004's top goalscorer Alfred Berge. In the 2005 Norwegian Football Cup Stord/Moster advanced from the first round on the expense of Askøy FK, but was stopped in the second round by Løv-Ham. The second-tier team won 1–0 after extra time.

After the spring season Stord/Moster was placed sixth on the table, but lost Alfred Berge to Flora Tallinn. Christian Brink moved away from Stord, but was not given a contract with any new club and commuted to play Stord/Moster matches. The financial situation also started becoming acute, with prospects that Simonsen and Løvvik's entire investment would be lost. In the summer the club stopped paying wages to six or seven players with contracts, and compensations to the rest of the players. When the club could not longer pay Vegard Hansen, he resigned as coach. Jonas Jonsson became acting coach. Despite all the setbacks, the club finished eighth and survived in its first Second Division season.

However, the turbulence continued. In October the players publicly demanded wages and a vacation. On 2 January 2006 the team collectively skipped the training session. Jonas Jonsson had not been paid at all for coaching the team. He went to Mandalskameratene. In January 2006 the sporting directors of Stord/Moster FK confronted the club owners with the hopeless economy. Right after this Simonsen's company ceased its commitments to the club.

More coaching problems also ensued. Bengt Førland from Haugesund had been hired as head coach from New Years'. His coaching position would account for 45% of his job; he would also be general manager and responsible for marketing. In early 2006 the non-coaching jobs were cut from the budget. As a result, Førland backed out in March 2006, citing unwillingness to commute from Haugesund just for a 45% job.

=== Stord Sunnhordland ===
At the same time, the club got new owners and changed its name from Stord/Moster to Stord Sunnhordland on 15 March 2006. The club was also supported by a new limited company named Sunnhordland Toppfotball AS. The new chairman of the board was Tjerand Espeland. A new coach, Morten Tislevoll, was soon hired. Ahead of the 2006 season the squad was strengthened with two players including Kevin De Serpa, but they lost five players, including Christian Brink to Sogndal.

Tips for the 2006 season outcome came from newspapers such as Stavanger Aftenblad, Fædrelandsvennen and Bergens Tidende. Fædrelandsvennen tipped a tenth place for Stord Sunnhordland, Stavanger Aftenblad tipped a thirteenth place (and relegation), and Bergens Tidende also tipped a thirteenth place. Stord Sunnhordland was eliminated by Fyllingen in the first round of the 2006 Norwegian Football Cup, In the 2006 Norwegian Second Division, Stord Sunnhordland struggled, and was even deducted two points for fielding players that were judged as non-eligible. After a loss to Flekkerøy in October the relegation was clear. A thirteenth place became the result.

A new head coach Petter Fossmark was hired before, in December 2006, it was decided to discontinue the club. Its spot in the league system and its squad was transferred back to Stord IL. The chairman of the new limited company Sunnhordland Toppfotball, which now supported the club, said that Stord Sunnhordland had "been a club without soul".

== League and cup statistics ==
League

League	Pos	P	W	D	L	F	A	GD	Pts	Result
Third Division, group 4, 2003	1	22	14	6	2	86	37	+49	48	Lost playoff
Third Division, group 4, 2004	1	22	18	1	3	73	32	+41	55	Won playoff
Second Division, group 3, 2005	8	26	9	6	11	39	47	−8	33	
Second Division, group 3, 2006	13	26	7	4	15	33	55	−22	23	Relegated

Cup

Cup	1st prem round	2nd prem round	1st round	2nd round
Norwegian Cup, 2003	Lost			
Norwegian Cup, 2004	Lost			
Norwegian Cup, 2005	—	—	Won	Lost
Norwegian Cup, 2006	—	—	Lost	
