= Børge Hernes =

Norwegian footballer (born 1976)

Personal information
- Date of birth: 11 December 1976 (age 49)
- Place of birth: Trondheim, Norway
- Height: 1.80 m (5 ft 11 in)
- Positions: Right-back; right winger

Youth career
- National
- Astor
- Rosenborg

Senior career*
Years	Team	Apps	(Gls)
1997–2000	Rosenborg	46	(4)
1999	→ Vålerenga (loan)	10	(1)
2001–2002	Skeid		
- * Club domestic league appearances and goals

Børge Hernes (born 11 December 1976) is a retired Norwegian footballer who played as a full-back or winger. He made his debut for Rosenborg BK in 1997 and played in the Eliteserien and in the UEFA Champions League. However, when Nils Arne Eggen resumed the managerial position at Rosenborg in 1999, Hernes fell out of favour and was loaned to Vålerenga before spending his final football years in Skeid.

== Career ==
Hernes played youth football for SK Nationalkameratene, on the team for boys born in 1975 together with Steffen Iversen (both as underage players). Following an internal disagreement, in 1989 the entire team moved over to another local club Astor FK. Hernes (and Iversen) then played on the junior teams of Rosenborg BK. In the summer of 1995, Rosenborg U20 won the Copenhagen Cup as Hernes scored the decisive goal against Brøndby U20. Rosenborg has compared Børge Hernes to Vegard Heggem, ranking Hernes as "perhaps a little faster".

Aspiring for Rosenborg's senior team, Hernes was allowed to sit on the bench against Bodø/Glimt in June 1997, before making his Eliteserien debut in July 1997 against Tromsø. His European debut came in the 1997-98 UEFA Champions League group stage against FC Porto.

In January 1998, Hernes scored two goals as a substitute in a friendly match against Rosenborg's rivals Molde, before scoring in another friendly, this time in South Africa against Grasshopper Club. As Hernes entered as a substitute and scored against Lillestrøm in August 1998, Adresseavisen opined that Hernes was better than Jan Derek Sørensen at the moment and should be starting as Rosenborg's winger. Hernes remained a Rosenborg regular throughout 1998, including starting the 1998 Norwegian Football Cup final, which Rosenborg lost.

In the 1998–99 UEFA Champions League qualifying rounds and group stage, Hernes played seven matches. Then, in 1999 Nils Arne Eggen returned to the helm as Rosenborg manager following a one-year sabbatical. Hernes later stated that he "clashed as a person" with Eggen. In the fall of 1999, Hernes was loaned out to first-tier competitors Vålerenga as a part-exchange in Rosenborg's purchase of John Carew. Rosenborg would pay Hernes' wages during the loan spell. Hernes made his Vålerenga debut on 29 July in a friendly match against Liverpool. Hernes was used both as a right back and striker in the 1–4 loss. His league debut came on 1 August and his only goal for Vålerenga came later in the same month against Viking.

Hernes did not favour the formation used by Vålerenga at the time, stating: "It says something about Rosenborg when it is far more fun to enter as a substitute winger than to play full matches for Vålerenga". Returning to Rosenborg in July 2000, Hernes was especially noted for scoring two goals against Stabæk, again as a substitute. Two weeks later, Hernes started as a right back against Lillestrøm, but following an own goal and a yellow card, he was substituted off at the 38 minute mark. While he admitted his performance came "as a blow", he would rather have played until half-time. Hernes therefore flung his jersey as he walked off.

His only European game during this spell, and his last overall, came in December 2000 against Alavés in the 2000–01 UEFA Cup. The 4–2 loss to Club Brugge away in the 1998–99 UEFA Champions League second qualifying round, which saw Rosenborg eliminate Club Brugge on the away goals rule, was considered the best European match by Hernes himself.

After the Norwegian 2000 season, Hernes was deemed surplus by Rosenborg. Hamarkameratene made an official inquiry as to Hernes' availability. Another club Moss FK had been interested during the summer of 2000, but some months later they bolstered a complete squad. Ahead of the 2001 season he then joined another Oslo-based club, Skeid, but amid a financial meltdown in Skeid and his own injury problems, he retired in 2002. In 2002 he had two surgeries to his meniscus. Having played a single match for Skeid that year, Hernes went on a sick leave in the summer of 2002. He asked the Norwegian Players' Association to help him find a new club.

== Life after football ==
After retiring, he studied finance. Before completing his master's degree, he was employed by KLP. For some time Hernes also joined an amateur football team Stort FK, playing on the seventh tier in Oslo. He moved to Bærum.
