= Jonas Jonsson (footballer) =

Swedish footballer (born 1975)

Personal information
- Date of birth: 10 November 1976 (age 49)
- Place of birth: Stockholm, Sweden
- Height: 1.84 m (6 ft 0 in)
- Position: Midfielder

Senior career*
Years	Team	Apps	(Gls)
- Assyriska FF
2000–2001	Bryne		
2002	Brann		
- * Club domestic league appearances and goals

Jonas Jonsson (born 10 November 1975) is a Swedish former professional footballer who played as a midfielder.

== Career ==
Jonsson joined Bryne FK from Assyriska FF ahead of the 2000 Norwegian Premier League season. He played in the 2001 Norwegian Football Cup Final. Ahead of the 2002 season he joined SK Brann. He struggled with a serious injury, and was released after his contract expired in late 2003. He did not play in 2004, but joined Stord Sunnhordland FK ahead of the 2005 Norwegian Second Division season.

In the summer of 2005 the club stopped paying wages to six or seven players with contracts, and compensations to the rest of the players. When the head coach, Vegard Hansen, resigned because the club could not longer pay his wages, Jonsson became acting head coach. However, he was not paid at all for coaching the team, and left for Mandalskameratene. He was playing assistant coach. Despite this he went on loan to Stord in the latter half of 2006. After the season Jonsson revealed that there had been cooperation problems with head coach Svein Hansen. He retired from football. In December 2006 he won a Supreme Court of Norway case, and was entitled to compensation for his injury sustained in 2001.
