= 2005 Norwegian Second Division =

Norwegian football league season

The 2005 2. divisjon season was the third highest association football league for men in Norway.

26 games were played in 4 groups, with 3 points given for wins and 1 for draws. Sarpsborg Sparta, Manglerud Star, Haugesund and Tromsdalen were promoted to the First Division. Number twelve, thirteen and fourteen were relegated to the 3. divisjon. The winning teams from each of the 24 groups in the 3. divisjon each faced a winning team from another group in a playoff match, resulting in 12 playoff winners which were promoted to the 2. divisjon.

== League tables ==
=== Group 1 ===
Pos	Team	Pld	W	D	L	GF	GA	GD	Pts	Promotion or relegation
1	Sarpsborg Sparta (P)	26	21	1	4	90	28	+62	64	Promotion to First Division
2	Vard Haugesund	26	19	3	4	88	27	+61	60	
3	Notodden	26	16	1	9	74	36	+38	49	
4	Bærum	26	14	6	6	66	42	+24	48	
5	Drøbak/Frogn	26	13	0	13	64	41	+23	39	
6	Groruddalen	26	11	6	9	61	49	+12	39	
7	Tollnes	26	11	4	11	49	46	+3	37	
8	Ørn-Horten	26	12	1	13	34	67	−33	37	
9	Sprint-Jeløy	26	9	4	13	45	61	−16	31	
10	Sarpsborg	26	9	1	16	45	60	−15	28	
11	Odd Grenland 2	26	8	4	14	35	55	−20	28	
12	Mercantile (R)	26	8	1	17	31	91	−60	25	Relegation to Third Division
13	Kvik Halden (R)	26	6	5	15	38	52	−14	23	Relegation to Third Division
14	Fram Larvik (R)	26	4	5	17	25	90	−65	17	Relegation to Third Division

Source: RSSSF
(P) Promoted; (R) Relegated

=== Group 2 ===
Pos	Team	Pld	W	D	L	GF	GA	GD	Pts	Promotion or relegation
1	Manglerud Star (P)	26	19	3	4	82	29	+53	60	Promotion to First Division
2	Raufoss	26	18	4	4	68	34	+34	58	
3	Nybergsund	26	16	5	5	57	26	+31	53	
4	Lørenskog	26	13	6	7	67	38	+29	45	
5	Ullensaker/Kisa	26	11	6	9	41	40	+1	39	
6	Molde 2	26	10	5	11	58	59	−1	35	
7	Eidsvold Turn	26	9	7	10	45	49	−4	34	
8	Gjøvik-Lyn	26	10	4	12	36	44	−8	34	
9	Kjelsås	26	10	4	12	41	53	−12	34	
10	Lillestrøm 2	26	9	6	11	42	53	−11	33	
11	Brumunddal	26	9	3	14	48	58	−10	30	
12	Træff (R)	26	7	4	15	40	57	−17	25	Relegation to Third Division
13	Frigg (R)	26	6	3	17	44	77	−33	21	Relegation to Third Division
14	FF Lillehammer (R)	26	4	2	20	26	78	−52	14	Relegation to Third Division

Source: RSSSF
(P) Promoted; (R) Relegated

=== Group 3 ===
Pos	Team	Pld	W	D	L	GF	GA	GD	Pts	Promotion or relegation
1	Viking 2	26	17	5	4	46	19	+27	56	
2	Haugesund (Note: Haugesund was promoted because Viking 2, being a B team, was ineligible for promotion.) (P)	26	14	9	3	65	31	+34	51	Promotion to First Division
3	Flekkerøy	26	15	5	6	49	32	+17	50	
4	Sandnes Ulf	26	11	9	6	57	43	+14	42	
5	Fyllingen	26	11	7	8	45	33	+12	40	
6	Ålgård	26	10	5	11	48	40	+8	35	
7	Årdal	26	10	4	12	34	44	−10	34	
8	Stord/Moster	26	9	6	11	39	47	−8	33	
9	Åsane	26	10	3	13	36	47	−11	33	
10	Fana	26	10	3	13	37	50	−13	33	
11	Klepp	26	7	8	11	32	43	−11	29	
12	Egersund (R)	26	5	8	13	34	51	−17	23	Relegation to Third Division
13	Hovding (R)	26	6	5	15	39	64	−25	23	Relegation to Third Division
14	Brann 2 (R)	26	5	7	14	45	62	−17	22	Relegation to Third Division

Source: RSSSF
(P) Promoted; (R) Relegated

=== Group 4 ===
Pos	Team	Pld	W	D	L	GF	GA	GD	Pts	Promotion or relegation
1	Tromsdalen (P)	26	17	4	5	64	34	+30	55	Promotion to First Division
2	Mo	26	15	2	9	59	44	+15	47	
3	Levanger	26	14	4	8	68	45	+23	46	
4	Strindheim	26	13	6	7	65	39	+26	45	
5	Steinkjer	26	14	1	11	64	62	+2	43	
6	Skarp	26	13	4	9	61	60	+1	43	
7	Byåsen	26	13	3	10	69	44	+25	42	
8	Ranheim	26	11	5	10	63	54	+9	38	
9	Harstad	26	9	8	9	46	47	−1	35	
10	Rosenborg 2	26	10	2	14	51	59	−8	32	
11	Kolstad	26	8	4	14	43	62	−19	28	
12	Lyngen/Karnes (R)	26	8	1	17	55	89	−34	25	Relegation to Third Division
13	Lofoten (R)	26	7	2	17	40	89	−49	23	Relegation to Third Division
14	Innstranden (R)	26	5	4	17	30	50	−20	19	Relegation to Third Division

Source: RSSSF
(P) Promoted; (R) Relegated

== Top goalscorers ==
- 30 goals:
  - (Norway) Kenneth Kvalheim, Notodden
- 24 goals:
  - (Norway) Vegard Alstad Sunde, Levanger
- 23 goals:
  - (France) Marc Antoine-Curier, Vard Haugesund
- 20 goals:
  - (Norway) Andreas Hauger, Bærum
- 19 goals:
  - (Norway) Sami Sakka, Vard Haugesund
  - (Norway) Espen Skogland, Haugesund
- 17 goals:
  - (Norway) Robert Stene, Ranheim
- 16 goals:
  - (Norway) Andreas Moen, Lørenskog
  - (Norway) Ronald Turner, Sarpsborg Sparta
- 15 goals:
  - (Norway) Dag Halvorsen, Kjelsås
  - (Norway) Kim Nysted, Bærum
  - (Norway) Trygve Velten, Drøbak/Frogn
  - (Norway) Fredrik William Henriksen, Flekkerøy
  - (Norway) Rune Ertsås, Steinkjer
  - (Norway) Kenneth Torstveit, Sandnes Ulf
