= Christian Brink =

Norwegian footballer (born 1983)

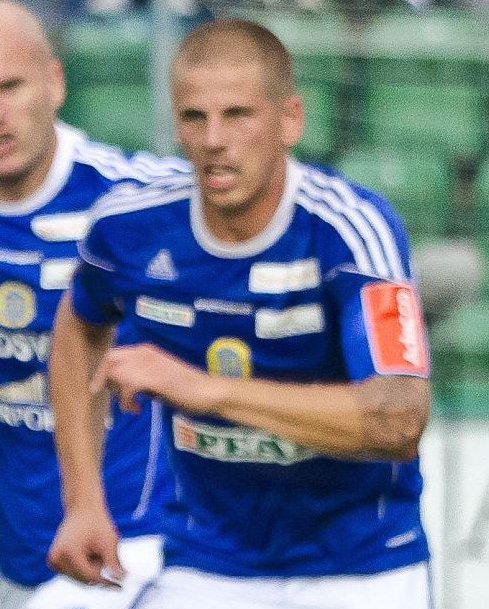

Personal information
- Date of birth: 17 March 1983 (age 43)
- Place of birth: Stord, Norway
- Height: 1.89 m (6 ft 2 in)
- Position: Defender

Youth career
- Stord

Senior career*
Years	Team	Apps	(Gls)
–2005	Stord/Moster		
2006	Sogndal	19	(0)
2006–2009	Lyn	33	(1)
2009–2012	GIF Sundsvall	70	(12)
2012–2014	Sarpsborg 08	34	(2)
2014–2015	Stord	15	(2)
2014–2018	Stord 2	20	(13)
- * Club domestic league appearances and goals

Christian Brink (born 17 March 1983) is a Norwegian retired footballer who played as a central defender. After playing for Stord/Moster in the lower leagues, Brink has played for Sogndal, Lyn, GIF Sundsvall and Sarpsborg 08.

== Career ==
Brink made his senior debut at the age of 17, and played for the local club Stord/Moster at the third and the fourth tier. He started socionom-studies in Sogndal in the summer of 2005, and travelled home to Stord to play matches in the Second Division while he was training with the First Division side Sogndal IL's first-team. Brink signed a two-year contract with Sogndal ahead of the 2006-season, and was bought by the Tippeligaen side Lyn a half-year later. With a transfer-fee of 4,4 million NOK, he became the then most expensive player at Lyn. He made his debut on 27 August 2006 against Sandefjord. He played all but three league games in 2007, but no games in 2008 and only two games in 2009. His last league game was on 24 May 2009.

Brink then signed for GIF Sundsvall in the summer of 2009, where he was a regular starter for the team in Superettan. Following GIF Sundsvall promotion, Brink played 10 matches in Allsvenskan before he joined the Norwegian First Division side Sarpsborg 08 in August 2012. In mid-2014 he returned to Stord. (Note: Christian Brink at the Norwegian Football Federation (in Norwegian))

== Career statistics ==
As of 11 November 2013

Season	Club	Division	League		Cup		Total	
Season	Club	Division	Apps	Goals	Apps	Goals	Apps	Goals
2006	Sogndal	Adeccoligaen	19	0	1	0	20	0
2006	Lyn	Tippeligaen	8	0	0	0	8	0
2007	Lyn	Tippeligaen	23	1	5	0	28	1
2008	Lyn	Tippeligaen	0	0	1	0	1	0
2009	Lyn	Tippeligaen	2	0	1	0	3	0
2009	GIF Sundsvall	Superettan	14	0	0	0	14	0
2010	GIF Sundsvall	Superettan	22	7	0	0	22	7
2011	GIF Sundsvall	Superettan	24	4	0	0	24	4
2012	GIF Sundsvall	Allsvenskan	10	1	0	0	10	1
2012	Sarpsborg 08	Adeccoligaen	11	0	0	0	11	0
2013	Sarpsborg 08	Tippeligaen	22	2	1	0	23	2
Career Total			155	15	9	0	164	15
