= Henning Hauger =

Norwegian footballer (born 1985)

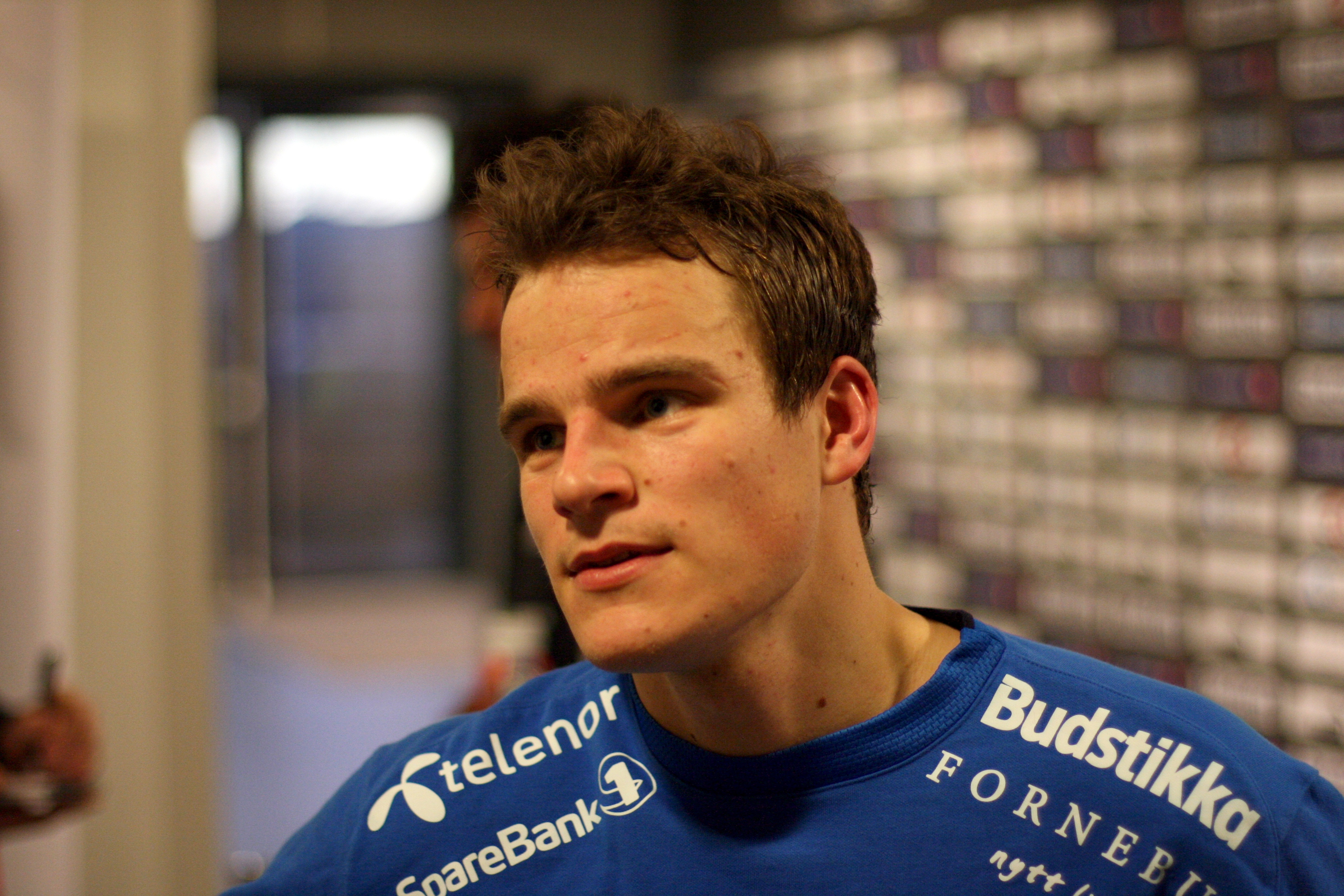

Personal information
- Date of birth: 17 July 1985 (age 41)
- Place of birth: Bærum, Norway
- Height: 1.79 m (5 ft 10 1/2 in)
- Position: Midfielder

Youth career
- Stabæk

Senior career*
Years	Team	Apps	(Gls)
2003–2011	Stabæk	184	(7)
2011–2013	Hannover 96	3	(0)
2012	Hannover 96 II	7	(0)
2012	→ Lillestrøm (loan)	9	(0)
2013–2016	Elfsborg	88	(2)
2017–2019	Strømsgodset	63	(0)
2021–2024	Bærum	74	(3)

International career^{‡}
2001	Norway U-16	6	(0)
2002	Norway U-17	8	(1)
2003	Norway U-18	5	(0)
2003	Norway U-19	12	(1)
2005	Norway U-21	14	(0)
2006–2011	Norway	23	(0)
- * Club domestic league appearances and goals as of 17 October 2026 ‡ National team caps and goals as of 24 June 2011

Henning Hauger (born 17 July 1985) is a Norwegian former professional footballer who played as a midfielder. He has previously played for Stabæk, Hannover 96, Lillestrøm, Strømsgodset, IF Elfsborg and Bærum and has been capped 23 times while playing for Norway.

Hauger represented Norway from under-16 to Norway U-21 before he made his senior debut in 2006, and was playing regularly as a holding midfielder in Egil "Drillo" Olsen's team between 2008 and 2011.

== Personal life ==
Hauger was born in Bærum into a family of sportspeople; his father Børre, his uncle Lars and his brother Andreas played both bandy and football for Stabæk IF. Børre and Lars played for the Norwegian national bandy team, and Andreas won the 1998 Norwegian Football Cup with Stabæk Fotball, when he came on as a substitute in the final. Andreas also played football and bandy in other local clubs, including several years in Bærum SK.

As Henning Hauger grew up, he was often attending Stabæk Fotball's home-matches in Tippeligaen supporting the team.

== Club career ==
Hauger made his debut for Stabæk's first-team against Odd Grenland on 21 April 2003, when he replaced Tryggvi Guðmundsson as a substitute in the 78th minute. The next season, Hauger made 16 appearances for Stabæk, and when the team was relegated from Tippeligaen other Norwegian clubs contacted Stabæk's director of sports, Jan-Erik Aalbu and wanted to sign the youngster. Hauger stayed with Stabæk in the First Division and was one of the best players at the second tier when the club won promotion back to Tippeligaen in the 2005 season.

Hauger was not playing regularly for Stabæk in the first half of the 2008 season, and when Espen Hoff joined the club from Lyn mid-season, the two clubs were talking about transferring Hauger the other way. However, Hauger became a regular in Stabæk's starting line-up in the second half of the season when Stabæk won Tippeligaen, and played the 2008 Norwegian Football Cup Final, which Vålerenga won 4–1.

After Stabæk's coach Jan Jönsson moved to Rosenborg ahead of the 2011 season, he stated that he wanted to sign Hauger, whose contract expired after the season, and dubbed Hauger as one of the best footballers in Norway. Stabæk was unwilling to sell Hauger to another Norwegian club, and Hauger played for Stabæk until August 2011, when he was sold to German side Hannover 96. He had been wearing the number 7 shirt for many years in Stabæk, but as this was already taken by Sérgio Pinto, Hauger got the shirt-number 15. Hauger made his debut for Hannover 96 on 6 August 2011, when he played the last 21 minutes as a substitute for Pinto in the opening match of the 2011–12 Bundesliga against TSG 1899 Hoffenheim. Hauger got limited playing time in Hannover and joined Lillestrøm on loan in August 2012. He made his debut for the club against Fredrikstad on 1 September 2012 when he replaced Espen Søgård at half time.

Hauger joined the Swedish champions IF Elfsborg on a free transfer in January 2013, after breaking his contract with Hannover 96, and signed a three-year contract with the club. Elfsborg's head coach Jörgen Lennartsson, whom also coached Hauger in Stabæk in 2012, was pleased with the signing and praised Hauger's passing abilities.

On 26 January 2017, Hauger signed a three-year deal with Strømsgodset. He was released at the end of the 2019 season. He joined Bærum SK ahead of the 2021 season. In December 2023, Hauger announced that he would be retiring and start in a new role as sporting director for Bærum SK.

== International career ==
Hauger was a regular in Norwegian youth teams and became a part of the under-21 team in 2005. He played 14 matches for Norway U21 between 2005 and 2006, and a total of 45 matches for different Norwegian youth teams.

When Kristofer Hæstad and Christian Grindheim was made unavailable for the friendly matches against Mexico and the United States in January 2006, Norwegian national team coach Åge Hareide decided to call up Hauger as replacement. This was Hauger's first call-up for the senior team, and he made his debut for Norway when he replaced Magne Hoseth at half time in the 2–1 loss against Mexico.

Hauger was again called up for the national team after impressing play for Stabæk in 2008, and played the 2010 World Cup qualifier against Netherlands on 15 October 2008, almost three years after he was last capped for Norway. Hauger soon became a regular as a holding midfielder in Egil "Drillo" Olsen's team, and started 18 consecutive national team matches until Håvard Nordtveit was chosen ahead of Hauger for the UEFA Euro 2012 qualifying match against Denmark on 6 September 2011.

After some time in Germany, Hauger was left out of the national team squad, as he was not playing regularly in Hannover. After he joined Lillestrøm on loan, he was again called up for the 2014 World Cup qualification matches against Cyprus and Slovenia in October 2012, but did not play any matches. Hauger has as of January 2013 gained 23 caps but has yet to score an international goal.

== Career statistics ==
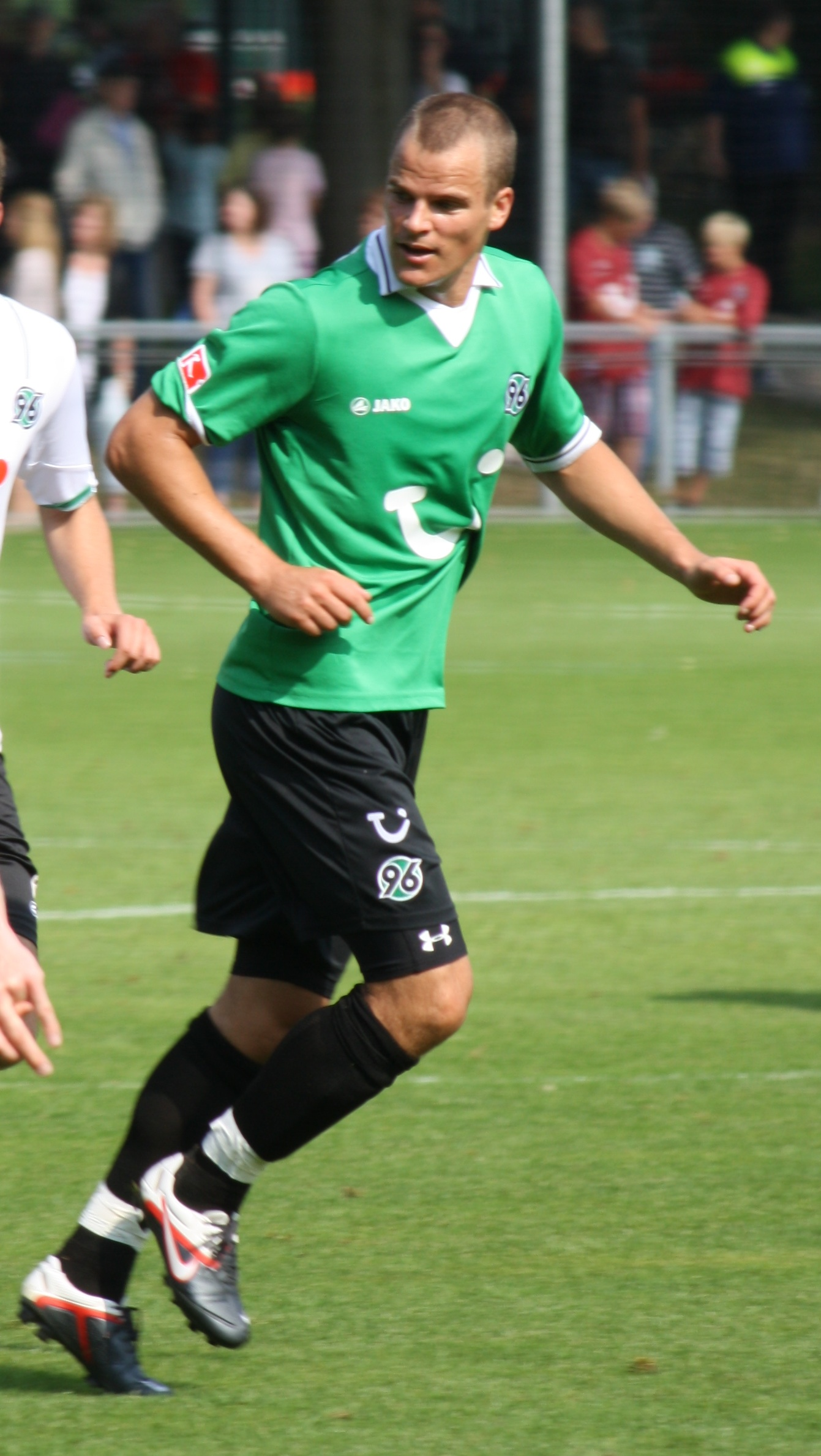
Henning Hauger in Hannover 96.

As of 26 August 2019

Season	Club	Division	League		Cup		Europe		Total	
Season	Club	Division	Apps	Goals	Apps	Goals	Apps	Goals	Apps	Goals
2003	Stabæk	Tippeligaen	2	0	0	0	0	0	2	0
2004	Stabæk	Tippeligaen	16	2	5	0	4	0	25	2
2005	Stabæk	Adeccoligaen	30	1	4	1	0	0	34	2
2006	Stabæk	Tippeligaen	19	1	2	0	0	0	21	1
2007	Stabæk	Tippeligaen	26	3	6	0	0	0	32	3
2008	Stabæk	Tippeligaen	18	0	5	0	0	0	23	0
2009	Stabæk	Tippeligaen	29	0	3	0	6	0	38	0
2010	Stabæk	Tippeligaen	30	0	3	0	2	0	35	0
2011	Stabæk	Tippeligaen	14	0	3	0	0	0	17	0
2011–12	Hannover 96	Bundesliga	3	0	0	0	2	0	5	0
2012	Hannover 96 II	Regionalliga Nord	7	0	0	0	0	0	7	0
2012	Lillestrøm	Tippeligaen	9	0	0	0	0	0	9	0
2013	Elfsborg	Allsvenskan	14	1	0	0	3	0	17	1
2014	Elfsborg	Allsvenskan	24	0	0	0	3	0	27	0
2015	Elfsborg	Allsvenskan	29	1	0	0	5	0	34	1
2016	Elfsborg	Allsvenskan	21	0	0	0	0	0	21	0
2017	Strømsgodset	Eliteserien	26	0	1	0	0	0	27	0
2018	Strømsgodset	Eliteserien	26	0	5	0	0	0	31	0
2019	Strømsgodset	Eliteserien	11	0	3	0	0	0	14	0
Career Total			345	9	40	1	25	0	410	10
