= Lennart Steffensen =

Norwegian footballer (born 1977)

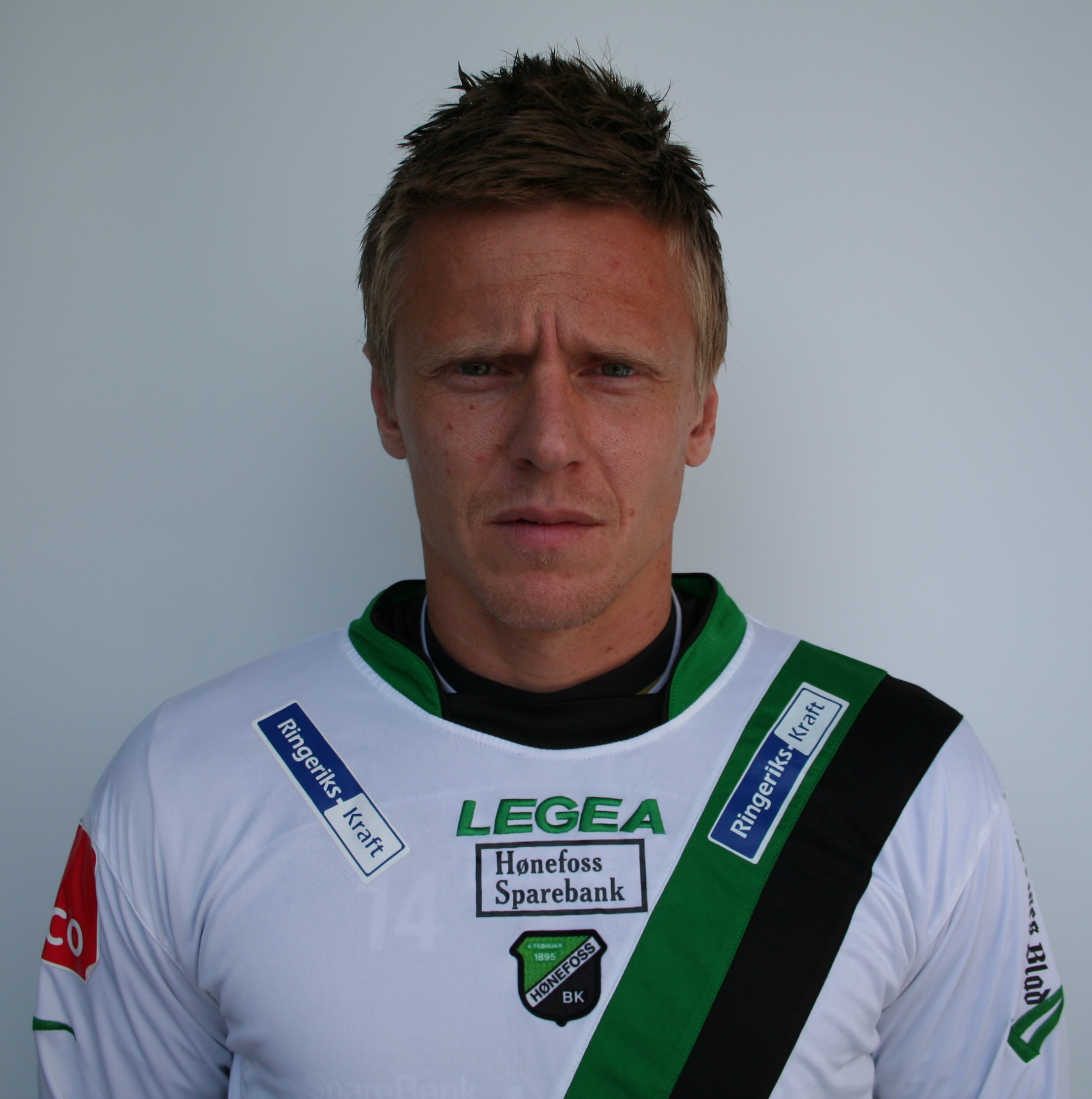

Personal information
- Date of birth: 12 July 1977 (age 49)
- Place of birth: Oslo, Norway
- Height: 1.82 m (5 ft 11 1/2 in)
- Position: Midfielder

Youth career
- Gjelleråsen
- Vestli
- Skeid

Senior career*
Years	Team	Apps	(Gls)
1996–1999	Skeid		
2000	Stabæk	9	(0)
2000–2002	Vålerenga	45	(3)
2002	→ Hønefoss (loan)	21	(0)
2003–2005	Hønefoss	60	(13)
2006–2009	Notodden	51	(3)
2009–2011	Hønefoss	57	(9)
2012–2015	Jevnaker	18	(16)
2016	Hønefoss		

International career
1999	Norway u-21	0	(1)
- * Club domestic league appearances and goals

Lennart Steffensen (born 12 July 1977) is a retired Norwegian football midfielder.

He was drafted into the senior squad of Skeid Fotball in late 1996. He played for the Norwegian under-21 team, and ahead of the 2000 season he joined Stabæk Fotball. However, he did not play regularly. As early as August 2000 he was shipped to Vålerenga Fotball. He played there until the spring of 2002, when he was loaned out to Hønefoss BK. The move was made permanent ahead of the 2003 season. Ahead of the 2006 season he went to Notodden FK. In August 2009 he was sold back to Hønefoss BK.

After a lengthy spell in Jevnaker IF, he joined Hønefoss for the third time ahead of the 2016 season. This was his last active season.
