= Anders Friberg =

Swedish footballer (born 1975)

Personal information
- Full name: Anders Richard Friberg
- Date of birth: 6 August 1975 (age 51)
- Position: Defender

Senior career*
Years	Team	Apps	(Gls)
1992–1994	Lunds BK		
1995–1999	Trelleborgs FF		
2000–2001	Bryne FK	45	(0)
2002–2006	Landskrona BoIS		
2007	Ängelholms FF		
2008	Lunds BK		
- * Club domestic league appearances and goals

Anders Friberg (born 6 August 1975) is a Swedish retired football defender.
