= Rosseland BK =

Association football club in Bryne, Norway

Rosseland
- Full name: Rosseland Ballklubb
- Founded: 1979; 47 years ago
- Ground: Rosselandsbanen, Bryne
- Capacity: 2,500
- Chair: Torfinn Edland
- Head coach: Kai Ove Stokkeland
- League: 4. divisjon

Rosseland Ballklubb is a Norwegian sports club from Bryne, Norway. It has sections for association football and table tennis.

The club was founded in 1979 by people who had previously been involved in Bryne FK and entered the Football Association of Norway in 1980 in 7. divisjon. The team plays in 4. divisjon, the fifth tier of Norwegian football.
