= Roger Eskeland =

Norwegian footballer (born 1977)

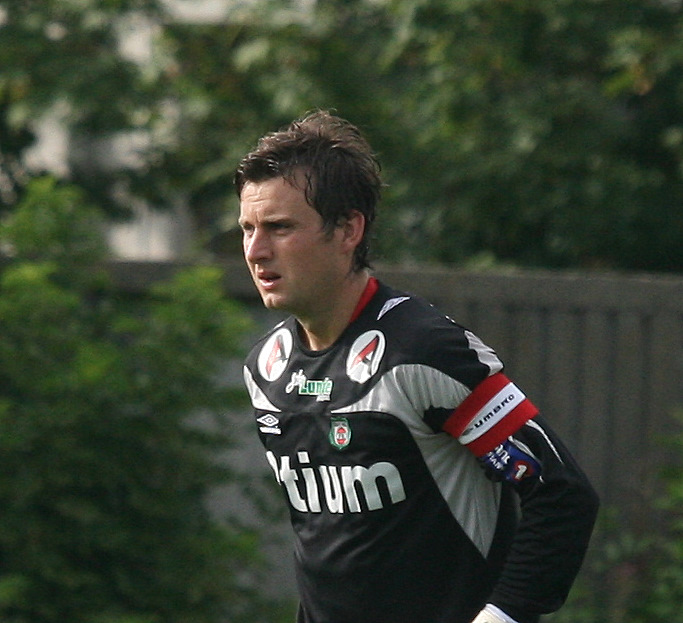
Roger Eskeland

Roger Eskeland (born 11 November 1977) is a former Norwegian football goalkeeper who played for Norwegian team Bryne FK. He joined the team in 1994, having played for lower league clubs Feda IL and Kvinesdal IL. He played for Bryne in the Eliteserien, and has also played for the Norwegian youth national teams from U15 up to the Norwegian under-21 team.
