= Kevin De Serpa =

Canadian soccer player

Personal information
- Full name: Kevin De Serpa
- Date of birth: May 21, 1980 (age 46)
- Place of birth: Toronto, Ontario, Canada
- Positions: Midfielder; forward

Youth career
- SL Benfica U18: Livingston FC U18 / Reserve

Senior career*
Years	Team	Apps	(Gls)
1999	Toronto Lynx	12	(0)
2001	EC Comercial		
2002	Mississauga Olympians	6	(8)
2003	Hamilton Thunder	15	(12)
2004	Penafiel	1	(0)
2004	→ Mirandela (loan)	6	
2005	Haugesund	22	(9)
2006	Stordk Sunnhordland	17	(4)
2007	Vard Haugesund	6	
2007–2009	Mandalskameratene	7	(0)
2009	Cambridge Supersonics	15	(12)
2009–	Forest City London	1	(0)

International career^{‡}
1998–1999	Canada U-20	7	(2)
2001	Canada U-23	3	(0)
- * Club domestic league appearances and goals as of 17 July 2009 ‡ National team caps and goals as of 25 April 2009

Kevin De Serpa (born May 21, 1980 in Toronto, Ontario) is a Canadian soccer player, coach, futsal player, and freestyle footballer,

== Career ==
De Serpa played professionally for a number of years abroad before returning to Canada to start Ginga Soccer Inc.
