= Kai Ove Stokkeland =

Norwegian footballer (born 1978)

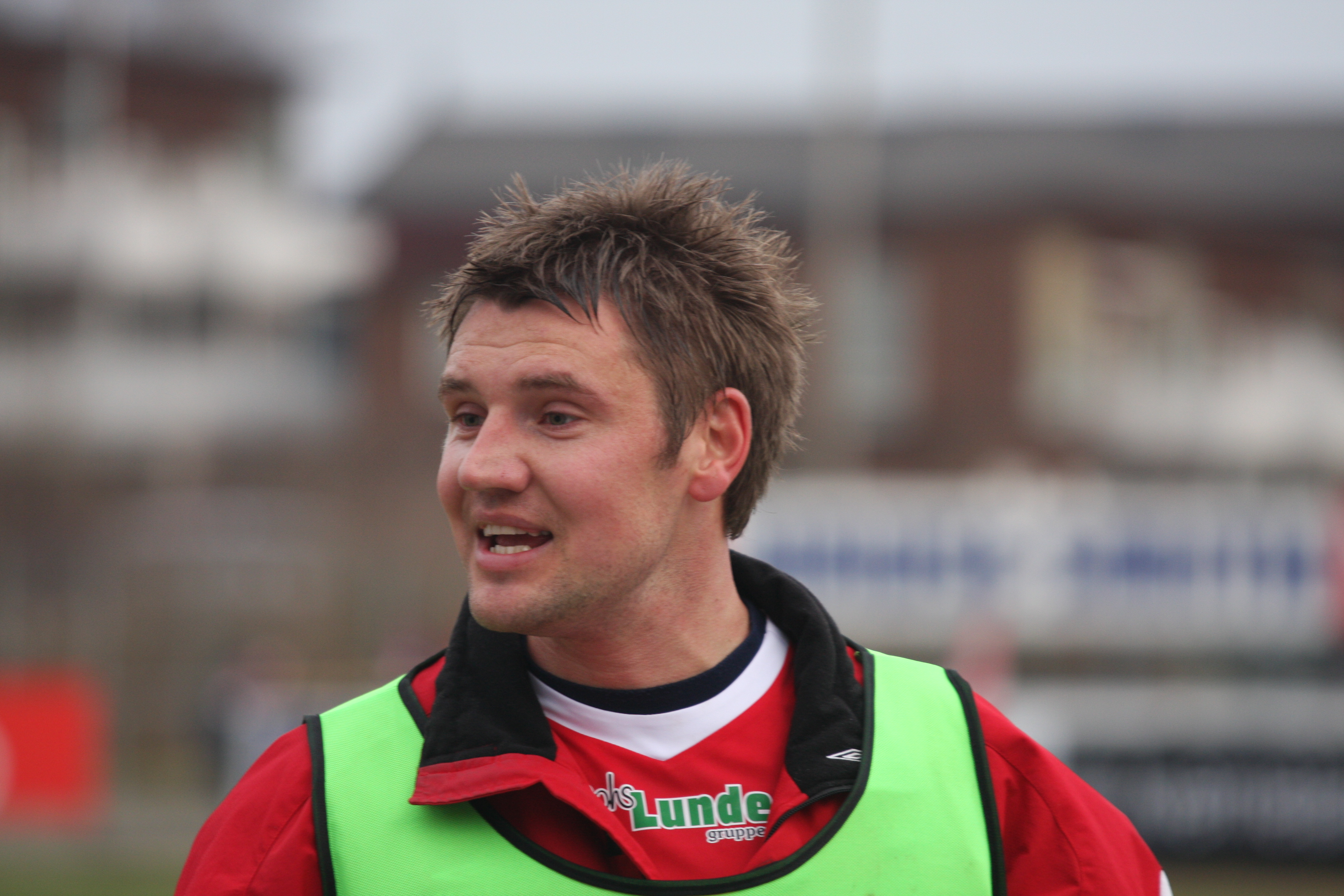
Kai Ove Stokkeland at Bryne Stadion

Kai Ove Stokkeland (born January 27, 1978) is a Norwegian football manager and former midfielder who currently manages Rosseland BK. He joined Egersund IK in 1998, before moving to Bryne FK where he played for the majority of his career as captain. He had a brief return to Egersund IK before a spell as a player-coach at Rosseland BK.
