= Christian Holter =

Norwegian footballer (born 1972)

Personal information
- Date of birth: 9 May 1972 (age 54)
- Height: 1.85 m (6 ft 1 in)
- Position: Defender

Youth career
- Heggedal
- Asker

Senior career*
| Years | Team | Apps | (Gls) |
| –1991 | Asker | | |
| 1992–1994 | Bærum | | |
| 1995–2005 | Stabæk | 225 | (22) |
- * Club domestic league appearances and goals

Christian Holter (born 9 May 1972) is a retired Norwegian football defender.

He started his youth career in Heggedal IL, and made his senior debut for Asker SK at the age of 16. In 1992, he joined Bærum SK. From 1995 he played for Stabæk Fotball. He played 214 Norwegian Premier League games and 11 First Division games in 2005. He won the Norwegian Football Cup 1998. He retired after the 2005 season.

He has a relationship with retired handball player Janne Tuven. They live in Sandvika.
