= Lasse Strand =

Norwegian footballer (born 1974)

Personal information
- Full name: Lasse Strand
- Date of birth: 3 April 1974 (age 52)
- Place of birth: Trondheim, Norway
- Height: 1.85 m (6 ft 1 in)
- Position: Defender

Senior career*
Years	Team	Apps	(Gls)
- Ranheim
- Fevåg
1999–2001	Rosenborg	10	(1)
2001–2004	Bryne	49	(0)
2005–2006	Byåsen	26	(1)
- * Club domestic league appearances and goals

Lasse Strand (born 3 April 1974) is a former Norwegian football (soccer) defender. He played mostly for lesser teams in Norway, but also had a spell with Rosenborg BK from 1999 to 2001 and after that played for Bryne FK and Byåsen IL.

== References / External Links ==
- Rosenborg WEB - Lasse Strand
- RBKweb - Tidligere spiller : Lasse Strand
- VG Nett - Lasse Strand
