= Trond Heggestad =

Norwegian footballer (born 1978)

Personal information
- Date of birth: 3 January 1978 (age 48)
- Position: Striker

Youth career
- –1995: Balestrand
- 1997: Sogndal

Senior career*
Years	Team	Apps	(Gls)
1996	Balestrand		
1998–1999	Sogndal	6	(0)
2000–2001	Viking	8	(0)
2002–2004	Åsane		
2004–2005	Løv-Ham		
2006–2018	Austevoll		
- * Club domestic league appearances and goals

Trond Heggestad (born 3 January 1978) is a retired Norwegian football striker.

In 1996 he played for Balestrand in the Seventh Division, the eighth tier of Norwegian football, before joining Sogndal's youth system in 1997. From 1998 he played for the senior team, albeit without league goals. Following an unsuccessful spell in Viking, he played in Bergen for Åsane and Løv-Ham before settling in Austevoll IK.
