= Axel Kolle =

Norwegian footballer (born 1973)

Personal information
- Full name: Axel Olav Kolle
- Date of birth: 24 January 1973 (age 53)
- Place of birth: Fredrikstad, Norway
- Height: 1.86 m (6 ft 1 in)
- Position: Midfielder

Youth career
- Cicignon
- Lyn

Senior career*
Years	Team	Apps	(Gls)
1991	Lyn	1	(0)
1991	→ Fredrikstad (loan)		
1992	→ Bærum (loan)		
1993–1995	Lyn	63	(24)
1996–2000	Stabæk	109	(10)
2001	Lyn	0	(0)
2003	Lyn	2	(0)
2004	Heming		
2014-2016	Bærumsløkka	12	(10)

International career
1990	Norway U17	2	(0)
1994	Norway U21	6	(0)
- * Club domestic league appearances and goals

Axel Olav Kolle (born 24 January 1973) is a retired Norwegian football midfielder.

He is a son of footballer Knut Kolle, and started his youth career in a small club named Cicignon. He then came through SFK Lyn's youth ranks, and in 1987 he trained with Sampdoria. He was also a sporadic Norway youth international.

He made his senior debut in the 1991 Norwegian Premier League, playing one game. In 1991, he went on loan to Fredrikstad FK, and in 1992 to Bærum SK. From 1993 to 1995 he played for Lyn again, and scored 24 goals in 63 league games. From 1996 to 2000 he played for Stabæk Fotball, scoring 10 goals in 109 league games. He won the Norwegian Football Cup 1998. He returned to Lyn ahead of the 2001 season, did not play because of injury, then retired, but returned briefly to play two games in 2003.

After a long hiatus, in 2010 he signed for low-level team Bærumsløkka FK together with Jan-Derek Sørensen and Glenn Hartmann.

== Honours ==
- Stabæk: 1998 Norwegian Football Cup champion
