= Vegard Hansen =

Norwegian footballer (born 1969)

- Hansen in 2026

Personal information
- Date of birth: 8 August 1969 (age 57)
- Place of birth: Drammen, Norway
- Position: Centre-back

Senior career*
Years	Team	Apps	(Gls)
1989–1994	Strømsgodset	140	(0)
1994	Kongsvinger	0	(0)
1994–1996	Bristol City	37	(0)
1996–1997	Strømsgodset	33	(0)
1998–1999	Kongsvinger	5	(0)
1999	→ Lofoten (loan)	21	(1)
2000–2001	Hønefoss	51	(1)
2002–2003	Strømsgodset	43	(2)
2005	Stord/Moster		
2005	Strømsgodset	4	(0)
2006–2011	Mjøndalen	55	(0)

Managerial career
- 2005: Stord/Moster
- 2006–2022: Mjøndalen
- 2023: Kongsvinger
- 2024–2026: Arendal
- * Club domestic league appearances and goals

Vegard Hansen (born 8 August 1969) is a Norwegian football coach and former player. During his time at Mjøndalen, the club was promoted to the 1. divisjon in 2008 and reached the play-offs for promotion to the Eliteserien in 2012, 2013 and 2014. In 2014 and 2018 the club won promotion to the top division.

== Playing career ==
As a player, he played for the clubs Strømsgodset, Kongsvinger, Bristol City F.C., Lofoten, Hønefoss, Stord/Moster and Mjøndalen. He played as a centre back.

== Coaching career ==
He began his coaching career in 2005 as the head coach of Stord/Moster. Ahead of the 2006 season, he took over as head coach at Mjøndalen IF, playing in 3. divisjon (fourth tier) at the time. Hansen led the team to promotion to the 2008 2. divisjon in his first season in charge. Mjøndalen finished in second place in 2. divisjon's group 4 in the 2007 season. In the following 2008 season, Mjøndalen won their second promotion in three years and was promoted to the 2009 1. divisjon. Hansen and Mjøndalen reached the play-offs for promotion to the Tippeligaen in 2012, 2013 and 2014. In 2014 the club won promotion to the Tippeligaen after a 4–1 win on aggregate against Brann in the play-off final. Mjøndalen finished 15th out of sixteen teams in their first season back at the first tier and were relegated. In 2018, they won promotion to Eliteserien after finishing in second place in the 2018 1. divisjon. In the 2019 Eliteserien, Mjøndalen avoided relegation through a last-match victory.

Vegard Hansen was sacked during the summer 2022, after a string of defeats, leaving his post after 17 years as the club's manager. Hansen was hired as Kongsvinger manager ahead of the 2023 season, but was sacked in October. Two months later he was hired as the head coach of Arendal Fotball.

== Honours ==
Individual

- Norwegian First Division Coach of the Month: May 2023
