= Thomas Finstad =

Norwegian footballer (born 1978)

Thomas Finstad (born 10 January 1978) is a retired Norwegian footballer. He plays as a striker.

He started his career by IL Jutul and joined 1994 to Bærum SK. It followed short spells for Stabæk and Strømsgodset before rejoining Bærum in 2008. In his comeback-season for Bærum he scored 10 goals.
