= Kjetil Løvvik =

Norwegian footballer (born 1972)

Personal information
- Full name: Kjetil Løvvik
- Date of birth: October 16, 1972 (age 54)
- Place of birth: Haugesund, Norway
- Position: Striker

Senior career*
Years	Team	Apps	(Gls)
- Skjold
- Nord
1995	Haugesund	14	(8)
1996–1999	Brann	61	(39)
1996	→ Vålerenga (loan)	25	(0)
1999–2003	Grasshoppers	6	(1)
2000–2002	→ Lyn (loan)	65	(13)
2003–2004	Stord/Moster		
- * Club domestic league appearances and goals as of 6 February 2016

Kjetil Løvvik (born 16 October 1972) is a retired Norwegian footballer.

He played for Skjold IL, SK Nord and FK Haugesund in his early career, before being sold to SK Brann in 1996. He was loaned out to Vålerenga for a period before making a breakthrough in Brann, and was sold in July 1999 to Grasshopper Club Zürich. His seldom played first-team football there, and was loaned out to FK Lyn. In the seasons 2000, 2001 and 2002 he played 65 league games and scored 13 goals.

Around late 2002/early 2003, Løvvik invested 1,000,000 kr together with football agent Terje Simonsen to form a new club in Stord, called Stord/Moster FK. In February 2003 Løvvik decided to cease his professional career to play for Stord/Moster in addition to owning the club. He lived in Oslo, but flew to Stord to play matches and became a prolific goalscorer. In 2004, he played less, and he retired after the season. By late 2005 his (and Simonsen's) involvement in Stord/Moster was over.
