= Jan-Derek Sørensen =

Norwegian footballer (born 1971)

Personal information
- Date of birth: 28 December 1971 (age 54)
- Place of birth: Oslo, Norway
- Height: 1.78 m (5 ft 10 in)
- Positions: Right midfielder; right winger

Youth career
- Bodø/Glimt
- Lyn

Senior career*
| Years | Team | Apps | (Gls) |
| 1991–1994 | Lyn | 49 | (7) |
| 1994–1997 | Bodø/Glimt | 79 | (19) |
| 1998–2000 | Rosenborg | 68 | (20) |
| 2001–2003 | Borussia Dortmund | 24 | (0) |
| 2003–2005 | Lyn | 72 | (23) |
| 2006–2007 | Vålerenga Fotball | 48 | (9) |
| 2008–2009 | FK Bodø/Glimt | 48 | (7) |
| 2014–2018 | Bærumsløkka | 33 | (41) |
| 2019 | Bærum 2 | 11 | (1) |
| Total | | 432 | (127) |

International career
| 1999–2004 | Norway | 21 | (0) |
| 2002 | Norway B | 1 | (0) |

Managerial career
- 2016–2018: Bærum (youth)
- 2019–2021: Bærum
- Heming (youth)
- * Club domestic league appearances and goals

Jan-Derek Sørensen (born 28 December 1971) is a Norwegian former professional footballer, who played as a right midfielder or right winger.

== Club career ==
Sørensen was born in Oslo. His breakthrough came at Lyn, where he played 49 league matches from 1991 to 1994. He later played for Bodø/Glimt from 1994 to 1997 and Rosenborg from 1998 to 2000.

After a spell with German team Borussia Dortmund from January 2001 to January 2003 (winning the Bundesliga title in 2001–02 and reaching the final of the UEFA Cup in the same season), Sørensen returned to Lyn. In 2004 he became their top scorer, with nine goals. In November 2005 he signed a contract with Oslo rivals Vålerenga, something that did not sit well with the supporters of Lyn. He then played two years for Bodø/Glimt in 2008 and 2009 before retiring from professional football.

After some months of hiatus, in 2010 he signed for sixth-tier team Bærumsløkka FK together with Axel Kolle and Glenn Hartmann.

== Manager career ==
After three years as youth coach in Bærum SK, he was announced as the new head coach ahead of the 2019 season. He was sacked in 2021.

== International career ==
Sørensen earned 21 caps for Norway, between 1999 and 2004.

== Honours ==
Borussia Dortmund

- UEFA Cup: Runner-up 2001–02
- Bundesliga: 2001–02
